= List of programs broadcast by CBC Television =

This is a list of programs broadcast by CBC Television, including current and former programming as well as soon-to-be-broadcast programming.

== Current programming ==
=== Original series ===
==== Drama ====
- Heartland (October 14, 2007 – present)
- Murdoch Mysteries (January 20, 2008 – present)
- Plan B (February 27, 2023 – present)
- Wild Cards (January 10, 2024 – present) (Note: Co-production with The CW)
- Allegiance (February 7, 2024 – present)
- Saint-Pierre (January 6, 2025 – present)

==== Comedy ====
- This Hour Has 22 Minutes (October 11, 1993 – present)
- Son of a Critch (January 4, 2022 – present)
- North of North (January 7, 2025 – present)

==== Reality/docuseries ====
- The Nature of Things (1960 – present)
- Land and Sea (1964 – present)
- Dragons' Den (October 3, 2006 – present)
- Still Standing (June 23, 2015 – present)
- The Great Canadian Baking Show (November 1, 2017 – present)
- Family Feud Canada (December 16, 2019 – present)
- Canada's Ultimate Challenge (2023 – present)
- The Assembly (2025 – present)

==== Talk shows ====
- q (June 11, 2013 – present)

==== Film presentations ====
- Canadian Reflections (June 10, 1978 – present)

==== News programming ====
- Regional newscasts
- The National (1954–present)
- Marketplace (October 5, 1972 – present)
- The Fifth Estate (1975–present)
- The Passionate Eye (1993–present)
- CBC News: Morning (1999–present)
- Absolutely Canadian (2009–present)
- Rosemary Barton Live (2020–present)

==== Awards shows ====
- Juno Awards (1975 – 2001; 2020 – present)
- Indspire Awards (1993 – present)
- Canadian Screen Awards (2013 – present)

==== Sports programming (CBC Sports) ====
- Hockey Night in Canada (1952–present; formerly in production until 2014; now produced by Rogers Media)
- Olympics on CBC (1956–present), which includes:
  - Summer Olympics
  - Winter Olympics
  - Youth Olympics

=== Canadian repeats ===
- Mr. D (2012–2018)
- Nirvanna the Band the Show
- Schitt's Creek (2015–2020)
- Workin' Moms

=== Acquired programming ===
- Coronation Street (1971–present)
- Escape to the Country (2014–present)
- Bondi Vet (2015–present)
- Grand Designs (2015–present)
- When Calls the Heart (2015–present)
- The Great British Bake Off (2018–present)
- Call the Midwife (2020–present)
- Jamie's 30-Minute Meals (2020–present)
- Miss Scarlet and The Duke (2020–present)

=== Children's programming (CBC Kids) ===
- Addison (2018–present)
- The Adventures of Paddington (2020–present)
- Aunty B's House (2023–2024; 2025-present)
- Bestest Day Ever With My Best Friend! (2023–2024; 2025-present)
- Big Blue (2021–present)
- Daisy & the Gumboot Kids (2019–present)
- Dino Ranch (2021–present)
- Dylan's Playtime Adventures (2024–present)
- The Future Chicken Today Show (2023–present)
- Gary's Magic Fort (2021–present)
- Gisele's Mashup Adventures (2023; 2025-present) (short series)
- Glowbies (2021–present)
- Go Togo (2024-present)
- Hello Kitty: Super Style! (2023–present)
- Hop (2024–present)
- Jeremy and Jazzy (2022–present) (short series)
- Jessie and the Gumboot Kids (2018–2019; 2022–present)
- Kingdom Force (2019–present)
- Kiri and Lou (2019–present)
- Let's Go Bananas! (2024–present)
- Lu & the Bally Bunch (2023–present)
- Mighty Express (2021–present)
- Mini-Jon and Mini-Maple (2023–present) (short series)
- Mittens & Pants (2023–present)
- Molly of Denali (2019–present)
- Ollie! The Boy Who Became What He Ate (2017–present)
- Paw Patrol (2022–present)
- Planet Protecting with Potato (2024–present)
- Playing with Stu (2024–present) (short series)
- Remy & Boo (2020–present)
- Rusty Rivets (2019–present)
- Scout & the Gumboot Kids (2015–present)
- Super Agent Jon le Bon (2018–present) (short series)
- True and the Rainbow Kingdom (2018–present)
- Ukulele U (2022–present)
- Unicorn Academy (2024–present)

== Former programming ==
=== Canadian series ===
- 11 Cameras (2006–2007)
- 18 to Life (2010–2011)
- 20/20 (1962–1967)
- 2015 Pan American Games
- 21 Thunder (2017)
- 55 North Maple (1970–1971)
- 72 Hours: True Crime (2004–2007)
- 9B (1986–1989)
- A Choice of Futures (1967)
- A City Story (1971)
- A Date with Frosia (1954)
- A Long View of Canadian History (1959)
- A Midsummer Theatre (1958)
- A Month of Sundays (1981)
- A Place for Everything (1964–1966)
- A Place of Your Own (1968–1971)
- A Show from Two Cities (1963–1964)
- A Summer Night (1962)
- About Canada (1956–1957)
- Absolutely Canadian (2016)
- Adrienne at Large (1974–1975)
- Adrienne Clarkson Presents (1988–1999)
- Adventures in Rainbow Country (1970–1971)
- After Four (1977–1978)
- Air Farce Live (1973–1997)
- Airwaves (1986–1987)
- Alan Hamel's Comedy Bag (1972–1973)
- Alan Watts on Living (1971)
- Albert's Place (1959)
- Album of History (1967)
- Alias Grace (2017)
- All Around the Circle (1964–1975)
- Alphabet Soup (1971–1973)
- An American in Canada (2003–2004)
- Anne of Green Gables (1985)
- Anne with an E (March 19, 2017 – November 24, 2019)
- Anyone's Game (2021)
- Any Woman Can (1974–1975)
- Applause, Applause (1974)
- Aquarium (1974)
- Arctic Air (2012–2014)
- Are You Putting Me On? (1975–1977)
- Art in Action (1959–1961)
- Arts '73/'74/'75 (1973–1975)
- Astronomy Today (1959)
- At the Hotel (2006)
- Atlantic Summer (1978–1979)
- Audubon Wildlife Theatre (1968–1974)
- Background (1959–1962)
- Bagatelle (1974)
- Ballads and Bards (1962–1963)
- Bandwagon with Bob Francis (1972–1973; 1975)
- Barbara Frum (1974–1975)
- Barney Boomer (1967–1968)
- Barney's Gang (1958)
- Baroness von Sketch Show (2016–2021)
- Battle of the Blades (October 4, 2009 – November 17, 2013; September 19, 2019 – 2020)
- The Beachcombers (1972–1990)
- Becoming Canadian (2017)
- Being Erica (2009–2011; 2022)
- Beethoven Lives Upstairs (1992 TV film)
- Bellevue (2016)
- Best Recipes Ever (2010–2014)
- Beyond Reason (1977–1980)
- The Big Revue (1952–1953)
- Bixby and Me (1975–1976)
- Black Harbour (1996–1999)
- Blackstone (2015)
- Blizzard Island (1987–1988)
- Bluff (1976–1977)
- The Bob McLean Show (1975–1981)
- The Book of Negroes (2015)
- The Border (2008–2010)
- The Boys from Baghdad High (2008 TV film)
- Broad Appeal: Living with E's (2020–2021)
- Burden of Truth (2018–2021)
- Burns Chuckwagon from the Stampede Corral (1954–1955)
- Call For Music (1957–1958)
- Camera West (1964–1967)
- Canada 98/99/100 (1964–1967)
- Canada After Dark (1978–1979)
- Canada: A People's History (2000–2001)
- Canada File (1961)
- Canada Outdoors (1967)
- Canada's Smartest Person (2014–2018)
- Canadian Antiques Roadshow (2005)
- Canadian Country Music Awards
- The Canadian Establishment (1980)
- The Canadian Experience (2004–2005)
- Canadian Express (1977–1980)
- The Canadian Farmer (1959)
- Canada: The Story of Us (2017)
- Cannonball, (1958–1959)
- Careers to Come (1976–1977)
- Carica-Tours (1952)
- Cartoon Storybook (1959)
- A Case for the Court (1960–1962)
- Catch a Rising Star (1976)
- Catch Up (1978–1979)
- Caught (2018)
- Cavendish (2019)
- CBC Championship Curling (1966–1979)
- CBC Concert (1952)
- CBC Concert Hour (1954–55)
- CBC Drama '73 (September 30 to December 2, 1973)
- CBC Docs POV (2015–2021)
- CBC Family Hour (anthology series, 1989–c. 2001)
- CBC Film Festival (1979–80)
- CBC Music Backstage Pass (2013–2020)
- CBC News: Sunday (2002–2009)
- CBC Selects (2014)
- CBC Summer Symphonies (1978)
- Ceilidh (1973–1974)
- Celebrity Cooks (1975–1979)
- The Challenge of the Lonely Sky (1974)
- Charcoal Chefs (1976–1978)
- Charlie Had One But He Didn't Like It, So He Gave It To Us (1966)
- Chasing Rainbows (1988)
- Check-Up (1963)
- Chez Hélène (1959–1973)
- Children's Cinema (1969–1975)
- Chilly Beach (2003–2005)
- Chrysler Festival (1957)
- Cities (1979–1980)
- Click (Canadian TV series) (1962)
- CODCO (1987–1992)
- The Collaborators (1973–1974)
- The College Game (1977–1978)
- Colombo Quotes (1978)
- Come Dance with Us (1960)
- Come Fly with Me (1958)
- Come Listen Awhile (1963–1964)
- Comics! (1993–1999)
- Coming Up Rosie (1975–1978)
- Commonwealth Jazz Club (1965)
- Concerning Women (1976)
- Conquest of Space (1969)
- Converging Lines (1977)
- Country Canada
- Concerto (1976)
- Coroner (2019–2022)
- Counterpoint (1967)
- Country Hoedown (1956–1965)
- Countrytime (1960–1966)
- Countrytime (1970–1974)
- Court of Opinions (1952)
- Cracked (2013–2014)
- Crash Gallery (2015–2017)
- Crawford (February 2, 2018)
- Creative Persons (1968; partly produced abroad)
- Cross Canada Curling (1961–1965)
- Crosspoint (1977)
- Curling Classic (1973–1979)
- Customer (Dis)Service (2012)
- Da Vinci's City Hall (2005–2006)
- Da Vinci's Inquest (1998–2005)
- Daily Tips for Modern Living (1998)
- Danger Bay (1984–1990)
- Dateline (1955–1956)
- The David Clayton-Thomas Show (1973)
- Day of Decision (1959)
- Degrassi Junior High (1987–1989)
- Degrassi High (1989–1991)
- Delilah (1973)
- The Detectives (2018–2020)
- The Diane Stapley Show (1976)
- Dianne (1971)
- Dieppe (1993–1994)
- The Disordered Mind (1960, 1963, 1966)
- Disclosure (2001–2004)
- Discovery (1962–1963)
- Distinguished Canadians (1971–1972)
- Do It for Yourself (1982–1985)
- Doc Zone (2007–2015)
- Dollars and Sense (1972–1975)
- Don Messer's Jubilee (1957–1969)
- Dooley Gardens (1999)
- Double Up (1974)
- The Doug Crosley Show (1973)
- Diggstown (2019–2022)
- Downton Abbey
- Dr. Zonk and the Zunkins (1974–1975)
- Drama at Ten (1955–1956)
- Dress Rehearsal (1970)
- Drop the Beat (2000)
- Drop-In (1970–1974)
- Earthbound (1982)
- Ed and Ross (1957, 1959)
- The Ed Evanko Show (1967)
- Edgemont (2001–2005)
- The Edison Twins (1982–1986)
- Ekhaya: A Family Chronicle (1997)
- Sharon, Lois & Bram's Elephant Show (1984–1990)
- Ear to the Ground (1992–1995)
- Empire, Inc. (1983)
- Encounter (1958)
- Encounter (1970–1974)
- Enslaved (2020)
- Essex County (2023)
- Exploring Minds (1953–1956)
- Exhibitionists (2015–2020)
- Eye of the Beholder (1974)
- Fakes (2022)
- Fashion File (1989–2009)
- Fashion File: Host Hunt (2007–2009)
- Ferment (1965)
- Film Fun (1974–1976)
- Final Audition (1978)
- The First Five Years (1971–1974)
- First Person Singular: Pearson – The Memoirs of a Prime Minister (1973–1975)
- The Fit Stop (1974–1975)
- The Filmmakers (2017–2018)
- Five Years in the Life (1968–1972)
- Flappers (1979–1981)
- Flight – The Passionate Affair (1976)
- Floor Show (1953)
- Fool Canada (2015)
- Football Huddle (1960)
- For the Record (1976–1984)
- The Forest Rangers (1963–1965)
- Fortier (2000–2004)
- Fortunate Son (2020)
- Four Directions (1998)
- Four in the Morning (2016)
- Four on the Floor (1986)
- Fraggle Rock (1983–1987)
- Frankie Drake Mysteries (2017–2021)
- Fred Penner's Place (1985–1997)
- French for Love (1965–1966)
- Fridge Wars (2020)
- The Friendly Giant (1958–1985)
- Friday Night with Ralph Benmergui (1992–1993)
- From the Vaults (2018)
- Front Page Challenge (1957–1995)
- Gallery (1973–1979)
- The Game of Scouting (1967)
- General Motors Theatre (1953–1961)
- Generation (1965)
- Genie Awards (until 2012)
- Gemini Awards (1987–2004, 2007, 2011)
- George Stroumboulopoulos Tonight (2005–2014)
- Getting Along Famously (2006)
- A Gift to Last (1976; 1978–1979)
- The Gill Deacon Show (2006–2007)
- The Goods (2016–2018)
- Good People (2020)
- Good Rockin' Tonite (1983–1993)
- The Great Canadian Culture Hunt (1976)
- The Great Canadian Escape (1977)
- Great Canadian Food Show
- The Great Canadian Pottery Throw Down (2024)
- The Great Detective (1979–1982)
- The Greatest Canadian (2004)
- The Greatest Canadian Invention (2007)
- Guess My Story (1954)
- Guilty or Not Guilty (1958–1959)
- Gullage's (1996–1997)
- Hangin' In (1981–1987)
- Hans in the Kitchen (1953–1954)
- Hard Times (1975)
- Hatching, Matching and Dispatching (2005–2006)
- Haunted Studio (1954)
- He Shoots, He Scores (1986)
- Healthier, Wealthier, Wiser? (1965)
- Hello Goodbye (2016–2019)
- Here and There (1955–1958)
- Here to Stay (1976–1977)
- Hi Diddle Day (1969–1976)
- History Makers (1970)
- Hobby Workshop (1953–1955)
- Hockeyville (2006)
- Holiday Canada (1968)
- Holiday Edition (1959–1961)
- Holiday Ranch (1953–1958)
- Home Fires (1980–1983)
- Homemade TV (1976–1977)
- Home Movies: The Great Canadian Film Caper (1966)
- Hot Docs at Home (2020)
- How About That? (1953–1954)
- How it Happens (1973)
- Howard Presents (1978)
- Howie Mandel's Sunny Skies (1995)
- Howie Meeker's Hockey School (1973–1977)
- Human Cargo (2004)
- Humour Resources (2021)
- Hymn Sing (1965–1995)
- Images of Canada (1972–1976)
- In Concert (1981)
- In the Common Interest (1955–1956)
- In the Kitchen with Stefano Faita (2011–2014)
- In the Mood (1971–1972)
- In the South Seas (1973)
- In Opposition (1989)
- In View (1962–1963)
- InSecurity (2011–2012)
- Inside Canada (1973–1974)
- Intelligence (2006–2007)
- International Law (1961)
- Interrupt This Program (2015–2017)
- The Inventors (1979)
- The Irish Rovers (1971–1978)
- Is There Life After Youth? (1974)
- It's a Living (1989–2003)
- It's a Musical World (1973–1975)
- It's Only Rock & Roll (1987)
- It's the Law (1956)
- Jake and the Kid (1961)
- Jazz Canada (1980)
- Jazz with Jackson (1953–1955)
- The Jim Coleman Show (1959–1960)
- Jimmy MacDonald's Canada (2005)
- The John Allan Cameron Show (1979–1980)
- Jonovision (1996–2001)
- The Journal (1982–1992)
- Jozi-H (2006–2007)
- Just Ask, Inc. (1981)
- Just for Laughs (1983–2024)
- Kaleidosport (1967–1972)
- Keith Hampshire's Music Machine (1973–1975)
- Kenny vs. Spenny (2003–2004)
- Keeping Canada Alive (2015)
- Keeping Canada Safe (2017)
- Keynotes (1964)
- The Kids in the Hall (1988–1995)
- The Kids of Degrassi Street (1979–1986)
- Kim's Convenience (2016–2022)
- King of Kensington (1975–1980)
- Klahanie (1967–1978)
- Lady is a Four Letter Word (1975)
- Landmark (1970)
- The Lenny Breau Show (1966)
- Leo and Me (1976–1981)
- Let's Do It (1974)
- Let's Face It (1963)
- Let's Go to the Museum (1954–1956)
- Let's Make Music (1953–1954)
- Let's Sing Out (1963–1967)
- Let's Speak English (1961–1962)
- Let's Talk Music (1962–1967)
- Liberty Street (1995)
- Life and the Land (1966)
- Life and Times (1996–2007)
- Little Dog (2018–2019)
- Little Miracles
- Little Mosque on the Prairie (2007–2012)
- Live and Learn (1959–1965)
- The Lively Arts (1961–1964)
- Living... (2007–2009)
- Long Shot (1959)
- Look Who's Here (1975–1976)
- Made in Canada (1998–2003)
- Maggie Muggins (1955–1962)
- The Magic Lie (1977–1979)
- The Magic of Music (1955–1958)
- Make the Politician Work (2009–2011)
- Making the Cut: Last Man Standing (2004–2006)
- The Man from Tomorrow (1958)
- Man in a Landscape (1963)
- Mansbridge: One on One (1999–2017)
- Marc's Grab Bag (1973-4)
- Marquee (1979–1980)
- Mary Walsh: Open Book
- Material World (1990–1993)
- Max Glick (1990–1991)
- Medical Explorers (1973)
- Memorandum on a Frozen Ark (1970)
- The Men and the Issues (1963)
- Mexico (1966)
- Michael: Every Day (2011–2017)
- Midday (1985–2000)
- Midweek (1971–1972)
- The Mills of Power (1990)
- Mister X in Canada (1960)
- Monday Night Special (1961)
- Moneymakers (1975–1979)
- Moods of Man (1968)
- Moonshine (2021–2023)
- The Morgan Waters Show (comedy)
- Mosquito Lake (1989–1990)
- Movie Night in Canada (2020)
- Movies with Manings (1959–1960)
- Mr. Chips
- Mr. Dressup (1967–2006)
- Mr Piper (1963)
- Mr. Wizard (1951–1965)
- Music Canada (1966–1967)
- Music For a Sunday Afternoon (1967)
- Music to Remember (1970)
- Music to See (1957 TV series) (1957)
- Music to See (1970s TV series) (1970–1979)
- Musical Moods (1958)
- My Kind of Country (1971)
- The National Dream (1974)
- New Film Makers (1969)
- News Profile (1972–1974)
- The Newcomers (1977–1980)
- Newsfile (1973)
- The Newsroom (1996–2005)
- NFB Film Can (1979)
- Nic and Pic (1975–1977)
- Ninety Minutes Live (1976–1978)
- North of 60 (1992–1997)
- North/South (2006)
- Northwood (1991–1994)
- Not My Department (1987)
- Nothing Too Good for a Cowboy (1998–1999)
- Now's Your Chance (1952–1954)
- Nursery School Time (1958–1963)
- The Odyssey (1992–1994)
- Of All People (1972–1974)
- O'Keefe Centre Presents (1967–1968)
- The Oland Murder (2020)
- Old Testament Tales (1957)
- Ombudsman (1974–1980)
- On Guard For Thee (1981)
- On the Evidence (1975–1977)
- On the Frontier of Space (1959)
- OWL/TV (1985–1990)
- On the Road Again (1987–2007)
- One More Time (1969–1970)
- One More Time (2024) (2024)
- One Night Stand (1976)
- One Northern Summer (1971–1977)
- Open House (1952–1962)
- Opening Night
- The Other Eye (1967)
- Our Hero (2000–2002)
- Outdoors with Hal Denton (1955)
- Outlook (1960)
- Outlook (1966)
- Over the Line Fence (1956)
- Overlord and the Underwoods (October 2021–2022)
- Par 27 (1978–1980)
- The Passionate Canadians (1977)
- Passport to Adventure (1965–1967)
- Pat and Ernie (1961)
- Peep Show (1975–1976)
- The Peggy Neville Show (1966–1967)
- The Peppermint Prince (1956–1957)
- Pencil Box (1976–1979)
- People in Parties (1960)
- People of Our Times (1974–77)
- People Talking Back (1979)
- Performance (1974-76)
- Pifffle & Co. (1971)
- Pilot One (1989)
- The Plouffe Family (1954–1959)
- Prairie Spotlight
- Pretty Hard Cases (2021–23)
- Programme X
- Pure (2017)
- Quebec in English (1965)
- Quelque Show (1975)
- Quentin Durgens, M.P. (1965–1969)
- Question Mark (1963–1974)
- Quintet (TV series) (1962)
- Rabbittown (2006)
- Race Against the Tide (2021–2024)
- The Raccoons (1985–1999)
- Range Ryder and the Calgary Kid (1977)
- The Rare Breed
- Razzle Dazzle (1961–1966)
- Reach for the Top (1961–1985)
- Recipe to Riches (2014)
- The Red Green Show (1997–2006)
- Red Serge (1986–1987)
- Regional File
- Reluctant Nation (1966)
- René Simard
- Replay (1971–74)
- Republic of Doyle (2010–2014)
- The Restless Wave (1970)
- The Rez (1996–1998)
- Rhapsody (1958-9)
- Rick Mercer Report (2004–2018)
- Rideau Hall (2002)
- Rita and Friends (1994–1997)
- Riverdale (1997–2000)
- The Romance of Science (1960)
- The Road to Adjustment (1960)
- Road to Avonlea (1990–1996)
- Road Movies (1992–1993)
- Rock Wars (1985)
- Rocket Robin Hood (1966–1969)
- The Romeo Section (2015–2016)
- The Ron James Show (2009–2014)
- The Rovers Comedy House (1981)
- Rumours (2006–2007)
- Run the Burbs (January 2022– 2024)
- St. Lawrence North (1960)
- Saturday Date with Billy O'Connor (1958-9)
- Saturday Night Movies (1977)
- Saturday Night Wrestling
- Scales of Justice (1991-95)
- Scarlett Hill (1962–1964)
- Science and Conscience (1968)
- Science Magazine (1975–1979)
- SCTV (1976–1984)
- Search for Stars
- Seaway (1965–1966)
- See for Yourself (1959–60)
- Seeing Things (1981–1987)
- Sesame Park (1996–2001)
- Shoot the Messenger (2016)
- Side Effects (1994–1996)
- Sidestreet (1975–1978)
- Sight and Cast (1965-6)
- Singalong Jubilee (1961–1974)
- Sit Back with Jack (1960)
- SketchCom (1998–1999)
- Skipper and Company
- SkyMed (2022–2025) (Note: Co-production with Paramount+.)
- Small Achievable Goals (2025–2026)
- SmartAsk (2001–2004)
- Snakes and Ladders (2004)
- Snapshots (2016)
- Some Honourable Members (1973-5)
- Some of My Best Friends are Men (1975)
- The Song Shop (1958)
- Sophie (2008–2009)
- Sort Of (2021–2023) (Note: Co-production with HBO Max)
- Sounds Good (1976)
- Space Command (1953–1954)
- Spirit Bay (1982–1987)
- Sports Weekend
- Spotlight on Film (1969)
- Stage Door (1960)
- Star Chart (1980)
- The Stationary Ark (1975)
- Stay Tooned (2022)
- Steven and Chris (2008–2015)
- Stock Car Races (1953–1954)
- Stompin' Tom's Canada (1974–1975)
- Story Seat (1962)
- Strange Empire (2014–2015)
- Strange Paradise (1969–1970)
- Street Cents (teen/consumer affairs) (1989–2006)
- Street Legal (1987–2019)
- The Struggle for Democracy (1989-90)
- The Stu Davis Show (1966)
- Summer Camping (1957)
- Summer Close-Up (1977)
- Summer Evening (1976)
- Summer Festival (1980)
- Summer Sounds '66 (1966)
- Summerscope (1980)
- Sunday Best (1971–1976)
- Sunday Pops Series (1977)
- Sunday Report
- Sunshine Canada (1967)
- The Superior Sex (1961)
- Swingaround (1967–1970)
- Switchback (children)/(teens)
- Switzer Unlimited (1976)
- Tabloid (1953–1960)
- Take 30 (1962–1984)
- TallBoyz
- Take Me Up to the Ball Game (1980)
- Talk About (1989–1990)
- The Tapp Room (1956–1958)
- Telescope (1963–1973)
- The Tenth Decade (1971)
- Terry and Me (1956)
- Their Springtime of Life (1972)
- Theme in Seven (1955)
- Theodore Tugboat
- Theologo '67 (1968)
- They All Play Ragtime (1981)
- The Porter (2022) (Note: Co-production with BET+)
- This Hour Has Seven Days (1964–1966)
- This Is the Law (1971–1976)
- This Is Wonderland (2004–2006)
- This Land (1970–1982)
- This Life (2015–2016)
- This Space for Rent (2006)
- This Week in Parliament
- Time for Sunday School (1962–1966)
- Titans (1981–1982)
- To See Ourselves (1971–1973)
- To the Wild Country (1972–1975)
- Toby (1968–1969)
- Tom Stone (2002)
- Trickster (2020)
- The Town Above (1959–1960)
- The Tommy Banks Show (1971–1974)
- The Tommy Hunter Show
- True North Calling (2017)
- Twelve for Summer (1966–1977)
- Twenty Million Questions (1966–1969)
- Twitch City (1998–2000)
- Two for Physics (1959)
- The Undaunted (1983)
- Under the Umbrella Tree (1986–1993)
- Undercurrents (1994–2001)
- Underdogs
- Undisrupted (2021)
- Up at Ours (1980–81)
- Urban Angel (1991–1993)
- The Urban Peasant
- V.I.P. (1973–1983)
- The Vacant Lot (1993–1994)
- Venture (1985–2007)
- Video Hits (1984–1993)
- Vietnam: The Ten Thousand Day War (documentary) (1980–1982)
- Viewpoint (Canadian TV program) (1957–76)
- Walter Ego (2005)
- The Watson Report (1975–1981)
- A Way Out (1970–1977)
- The Wayne and Shuster Show
- The Weekly with Wendy Mesley (2018–2020)
- What It's Like Being Alone (2006)
- What on Earth (1971–1975)
- What's for Dinner?
- What's New (1972–1989)
- Where the Sky Begins (1976)
- The Whiteoaks of Jalna (1972)
- Wicks (1979–1981)
- Wild Roses (2009)
- Wind at My Back (1996–2001)
- The Winners (1982)
- Witness (1992–2004)
- Wojeck (1966–1968)
- Wok with Yan (1980–1982)
- Wonderstruck (1986–1992)
- The World Challenge (1986)
- The World of Man (1970–1975)
- The World on Stage (1967)
- X Company (2015–2017)
- Yes You Can (1980–1983)
- You Can't Ask That (2019–2024)
- Young Chefs
- Young Drunk Punk (2015)
- ZeD (interactive) (2002–2006)
- Zut! (1970–1971)

=== Acquired programming ===
- 2014 Commonwealth Games
- Absolutely Fabulous (1994–1999)
- The Adventures of Black Beauty (1973–1976)
- All in the Family (1972–1979)
- All My Children (1982–1998)
- Albion Market
- Archie Bunker's Place (1979–1982)
- Arrested Development
- As the World Turns
- Banished (2015–present)
- Barney Miller (1975–1985)
- The Beverly Hillbillies (1966–1971)
- Billy Liar
- Blossom (1991-1992;1993–1995)
- The Bob Newhart Show (1972–1977)
- Bonanza (1961–1970)
- Boy Dominic
- The Brothers McGregor
- Buffalo Bill (1984)
- The Bugs Bunny Show (1961–1975)
- Cannon (1971–1975)
- Can't Hurry Love (1995–1996)
- Commonwealth Televiews (1957–1958)
- Carol & Company (1990–1991)
- The Carol Burnett Show (1972–1978)
- The Catherine Tate Show
- Chico and the Man (1974–1977)
- Crossing Lines (2013–2015)
- Dallas (1978–1991)
- Designing Women (1986–1993)
- The Dick Van Dyke Show (1969–1973)
- Diff'rent Strokes (1978–1990)
- Disney Parks Christmas Day Parade (1983–2018)
- Doctor Who (2005)
- Dragnet (1954–1958)
- Dragnet (1967–1968)
- The Edge of Night
- The Ed Sullivan Show (1954–1971)
- The Electric Company (1973–1975)
- Elephant Boy
- Emmerdale
- Empty Nest (1988–1997)
- The Facts of Life (1979–1992)
- Fame (1982–1984)
- Family Matters (1993–1998)
- Father Ted (1997–1998)
- Fawlty Towers (1976–1977, 1979)
- The Flintstones
- The Fresh Prince of Bel-Air (1990–1998)
- The George Burns and Gracie Allen Show
- Generations
- Getting Together
- Ghost Whisperer (2009–2010)
- The Golden Girls (1985–1996)
- The Golden Palace (1992–1993)
- The Governor & J.J. (1969–1970)
- Grange Hill (1982–1984)
- Green Acres
- Guiding Light
- Gunsmoke
- Happy Days (1974–1984)
- Hardcastle and McCormick
- Have Gun-Will Travel
- Here's Lucy (1972–1974)
- Highway Patrol
- The Honeymooners
- The Huckleberry Hound Show (1959–1964)
- Hustle
- I Love Lucy
- The Jim Henson Hour (1989–1991)
- Jekyll and Hyde (2016–present)
- Jeopardy! (2008–2012)
- Joanie Loves Chachi (1982)
- Kate & Allie (1984–1992)
- Laurel and Hardy (1956–1958, 1968–1972)
- Leave It to Beaver
- Love Child (2015–present)
- The Lucy Show (1963–1964)
- Mary Kay and Johnny
- The Mary Tyler Moore Show (1971–1980)
- M*A*S*H (1972–1983)
- Maude (1972–1975, 1986–1987)
- The Mickey Mouse Club (1955–1959)
- The Mommies (1993–1995)
- Mork and Mindy (1978–1982)
- Mr. Bean (1992–2005)
- The Muppet Show (1976–1982)
- Murder, She Wrote (1984–1986)
- The Nanny (1993–1996)
- Newhart (1982–1995)
- The New Dick Van Dyke Show (1971–1973)
- One Life to Live (1993–1997)
- The Paper Chase (1978, 1981)
- Pardon the Expression
- The Partridge Family (1970–1976)
- Peanuts (1966–1996)*
- Please Like Me (2013–16)
- The Perry Como Show
- Phyllis
- Police Story
- Ponderosa
- The Porter (2022) (Note: Co-production with BET+)
- The Prisoner
- The Quick Draw McGraw Show (1960–1963)
- Raised by Wolves (2015–present)
- Remington Steele
- Return of the Saint
- Return to Eden
- Rhoda
- Rocky and His Friends (1959–1964)
- The Ropers (1979–1980)
- Round the Twist
- Ryan's Hope
- Salty (1975, 1977)
- Search for Tomorrow
- The Secret Diary of Adrian Mole
- Secrets & Lies
- Sesame Street (1970–1996)
- The Simpsons
- Soul Train
- Space: 1999
- Star Trek (1988–1995)
- The Super 6 (1966–1967)
- Taxi
- That Girl
- Thirtysomething
- This Week in Baseball
- Three's a Crowd (1984–1985)
- Three's Company (1977–1987)
- The Tomorrow People (1977)
- The Tony Randall Show
- Too Close for Comfort (1980–1986)
- Torchwood
- Trapper John, M.D. (1986–1990)
- Turn Out the Lights
- The Undersea World of Jacques Cousteau
- Upstairs, Downstairs
- Vision On (1975–1978, 1982)
- The Waltons (1973–1976)
- Welcome Back, Kotter (1975–1977)
- Wheel of Fortune (2008–2012)
- The White Shadow (1979–1981)
- Wild Bill (March 9, 2020 – 6 June 2020)
- WKRP in Cincinnati (1978–1982)
- The Wonder Years (1988–1999)
- The Wonderful World of Disney (1988–2007)
- The Woody Woodpecker Show (1957–1959, 1963–1964, 1971)

=== Children's programming (post–1994) ===
- Ace Lightning (2002–2006)
- The Adventures of Napkin Man! (2013–2020)
- Amigo and Me (1999–2000; 2003–2004)
- Animalia (2007–2009)
- Animal Mechanicals (2008–2016)
- Are We There Yet?: World Adventure (2010–2016)
- The Art Show (2018–2019)
- Arthur (1998–2021)
- Artzooka! (2010–2018)
- The Babaloos (1997–2003)
- Babar (1989–1991)
- Barney & Friends (1994–1995)
- Beat Bugs (2018–2022)
- Becca's Bunch (2018–2020, 2022–2024)
- Big Block SingSong (2012–2022)
- The Blobheads (2003–2004)
- Bo on the Go! (2007–2016)
- Bookaboo (2013–2019)
- The Bravest Knight (2021–2023)
- Bruno and the Banana Bunch (2008–2013)
- Busytown Mysteries (2008–2015)
- The Busy World of Richard Scarry (1999–2000)
- Canadian Sesame Street (1972–1996)
- The Cat in the Hat Knows a Lot About That! (2011–2019)
- CBC Kids News Explains (short series)
- CBCNews.real (2000–2002)
- CBC Playground (1994–1998)
  - The Adventures of Spot
  - Dig & Dug with Daisy
  - Little Rabbit
  - Max the Cat
  - Miffy
  - Old Bear Stories
  - Plastinots
  - Picture Perfect
  - Sharon, Lois & Bram Sing A to Z
  - Tom and Tim
  - Wiggly Pics
  - Works
- Chirp (2015–2019)
- Clifford the Big Red Dog (2000–2007)
- Clifford's Puppy Days (2003–2004)
- Cross Country Fun Hunt (2012–2017)
- Curious George (2006–2009)
- Cyberchase (2002–2005)
- Daniel Tiger's Neighbourhood (2013–2022)
- Detention Adventure (2019–2023)
- Dex Hamilton: Alien Entomologist (2010–2012)
- dirtgirlworld (2009–2015)
- Does It Fart? (2019–2020) (short series)
- The Doodlebops (2005–2015)
- The Doodlebops Rockin' Road Show (2010–2015)
- The Doozers (2013–2014)
- Dot. (2016–2024)
- Dragon Booster (2004–2010)
- Dragon Tales (2000–2006)
- Ebb and Flo (2006–2007)
- The Edison Twins (1984–1989)
- Endlings (2020)
- Find Me in Paris (2019–2020)
- Fraggle Rock (1983–1988; 2001)
- Franklin (1999–2007)
- Fred Penner's Place (1985–1997)
- The Friendly Giant (1958–1987; 1996–1997)
- The Furchester Hotel (2017–2022)
- Fuzzy Tales (2012–2016)
- Gangnam Project (2024)
- Gofrette (2007–2011)
- Guess What? (1996–2000)
- Hippo Tub Company (2001–2003)
- Holy Baloney (2018–2020) (short series)
- Horrible Histories (2001–2002)
- Incredible Story Studios (2001–2002)
- Inuk (2001–2002)
- JiggiJump (2013–2015)
- The Kids of Degrassi Street (1982–1988)
- Lazoo (2017–2019)
- Little Bear (1995–2007)
- The Longhouse Tales (2001–2002)
- Love Monster (2020–2024)
- Lunar Jim (2006–2014)
- Magi-Nation (2007–2012)
- Maya the Bee (1983–1984)
- The Magic School Bus (2000–2003)
- Me Too! (2002–2006)
- The Mighty Jungle (2008–2017)
- The Moblees (2014–2021)
- Monster Math Squad (2012–2016)
- Mr. Dressup (1967–2006)
- Mr. Meaty (2005–2009)
- Mumble Bumble (1999–2005)
- My Goldfish Is Evil! (2006–2017)
- Nanalan' (2003–2007)
- The Naughty Naughty Pets (2006–2010)
- Noddy (1998–2003)
- OWL/TV (1985–1988)
- Pablo (2018–2020)
- Pelswick (2000–2003)
- PJ Masks (2018–2023)
- Pinky Dinky Doo (2006–2008)
- Pingu (1997–2000)
- Pirates: Adventures in Art (2010–2016)
- Poko (2003–2017)
- Polka Dot Shorts (1998–2000)
- POV Sports (2003–2004)
- The Raccoons (1985–2000)
- Razzberry Jazzberry Jam (2009–2012)
- RECAP (2019–2020)
- Ride or Wrong (2015–2020)
- RoBOTiK (2022)
- Rolie Polie Olie (1998–2007)
- Ruby Skye P.I. (2014–2017)
- The Save-Ums! (2003–2010)
- Scoop and Doozie (1999–2003)
- The Secret World of Og (2006–2008)
- See the Sea (2008–2013)
- Sesame Park (1996–2001)
- Sharon, Lois & Bram's Elephant Show (1984–1990)
- Shoebox Zoo (2004–2006)
- Skinnamarink TV (1997–2003)
- Slim Pig (2001–2012)
- Small Talk (2018–2019)
- Snapshots (2016)
- Spynet (2002–2006)
- Stella and Sam (2018–2022)
- Street Cents (1989–2006)
- Street Cents Group Chat (2022–2023)
- Super Gran (1985–1986; 1988)
- Super Why! (2007–2019)
- Surprise! It's Edible Incredible! (2004–2016)
- Switchback (1985–1990)
- Taina (2003–2004)
- Theodore Tugboat (1993–2003)
- The Thrillusionists (2018–2020; 2022–2023)
- Time Tremors (2013–2016)
- Tiny Planets (2002–2005)
- Tractor Tom (2003–2006)
- Turbo Dogs (2009–2013)
- Under the Umbrella Tree (1987–1994)
- Vid Kids (1985–1988)
- Wandering Wenda (2017–2023)
- What's New? (1972–1989)
- What's Your News? (2009–2016)
- Wilbur (2006–2009)
- Will's Jams (2013–2020)
- Wimzie's House (1996–2000)
- The Wonder Gang (2021–2022)
- Wonderstruck (1986–1992)
- Worldsagents (2005–2014)
- Yam Roll (2006–2010)
- You & Me (2013–2019)
- Zoboomafoo (2000–2007)
- Zoe and Charlie (2001)

== See also ==
- Lists of Canadian television series
- List of Canadian television channels
