= Stage Door (disambiguation) =

Stage Door is a 1937 RKO film directed by Gregory La Cava.

Stage Door may also refer to:

- Stage Door (play), a 1936 play by Edna Ferber and George S. Kaufman; basis for the film
- Stage Door (TV series), a 1960 Canadian music variety television series
- The Stage Door, a 1950 American drama TV series
- Stage Door Records, a UK record label

Stagedoor may refer to:

- Stagedoor Manor, a performing arts training center in Loch Sheldrake, New York, U.S.
- Stagedoor Dinner Theatre, a dinner theatre in Brisbane, Australia
