= My Kind of Country =

My Kind of Country may refer to:

- My Kind of Country (Reba McEntire album), 1984
- My Kind of Country (Van Zant album), 2007
- My Kind of Country (Canadian TV series), a 1971 country music television series
- My Kind of Country (American TV series), a 2023 country music competition television series
- My Kind of Country Music, a 1965 studio album by Hank Locklin
- "My Kind of Country", a 2022 song by Kid Rock from the album Bad Reputation (Kid Rock album)
