= Martin Coleman (disambiguation) =

Martin Coleman is an Irish retired hurler.

Martin Coleman may also refer to:

== Other sportspeople ==
- Martin Coleman Jnr, Irish sportsperson
- Martin Coleman (American football), played in 2007 USC Trojans football team

== Others ==
- Martyn Coleman (screenwriter) on Drama at Ten
- Martin Coleman (songwriter) on New Ways but Love Stays
- Martin Coleman, leader of Satellite IRG
- Martin Coleman (Mr and Mrs Smith), fictional character in 2005 film
