= Lady Is a Four Letter Word =

- Genre: Current affairs
- Presented by: Elizabeth Gray
- Voices of: Bob Carl
- Country of origin: Canada
- Original language: English
- No. of seasons: 1

Production
- Producer: Nancy McLarty
- Running time: 30 minutes

Original release
- Network: CBC Television
- Release: 11 April – 30 May 1975

Lady Is a Four Letter Word is a Canadian current affairs television series that aired on CBC Television in 1975.

== Premise ==
This Ottawa-produced series on women's issues was hosted by Elizabeth Gray with announcer Bob Carl. Topics such as home and workplace, marriage and singleness were featured. A highlight of the series was that persons deemed sexist were written on an "honour roll" of toilet paper.

== Scheduling ==
This half-hour series was initially aired locally from 20 January 1975. It was broadcast on the national network Fridays at 1:00 p.m. (Eastern) from 11 April to 30 May 1975.
