= The First Five Years =

- Genre: Informational
- Presented by: Bette Stephenson; Lloyd Robertson (1971–73); Harry Brown (1973–74)
- Country of origin: Canada
- Original language: English
- No. of seasons: 3 (1 national)

Production
- Producer: Dodi Robb
- Running time: 30 minutes

Original release
- Network: CBC Television
- Release: 4 October 1971 – 9 May 1974

The First Five Years is a Canadian informational television series that aired on CBC Television from 1971 to 1974.

== Premise ==
The series is about children younger than school age. Lloyd Robertson and Bette Stephenson were hosts for the first two seasons which aired locally on CBLT Toronto. Its third season was broadcast on the national network with Harry Brown replacing Robertson as a regular host.

== Scheduling ==
The half-hour series was initially produced as a local programme for CBLT on Wednesday afternoons from 4 October 1971 until 9 May 1973. It was broadcast nationally Thursdays at 2:30 p.m. for one season from 4 October 1973 to 9 May 1974.
