= They All Play Ragtime =

- Genre: Documentary
- Country of origin: Canada
- Original language: English
- No. of seasons: 1
- No. of episodes: 6

Production
- Producer: Neil Sutherland
- Production location: Vancouver
- Running time: 30 minutes

Original release
- Network: CBC Television
- Release: 3 May – 7 June 1981

They All Play Ragtime is a Canadian historical documentary television miniseries that aired on CBC Television in 1981.

== Production ==
This series documented the history of ragtime music and its performers such as Eubie Blake, Max Morath, Dick Wellstood, Milton Kaye and Dick Hyman.

Performances from the Canadian Brass and the Nexus percussion group were included during the series.

== Scheduling ==
This half-hour series was broadcast on Sundays at 10:00 p.m. (Eastern) from 3 May to 7 June 1981.
