= The Song Shop =

- Genre: Children's television
- Presented by: Thomas Kines
- Country of origin: Canada
- Original language: English
- No. of seasons: 1

Production
- Production location: Ottawa
- Running time: 15 minutes

Original release
- Network: CBC Television
- Release: 1 July – 14 October 1958

The Song Shop was a Canadian children's music television program which aired on CBC Television in 1958.

== Premise ==
Tom Kines performed folk songs for children in this Ottawa-produced program. Episodes are set in a store, which contains various items on which song selections were based. The debut episode, for example, dwelled on Irish music with guest violinist Janet Jameson who assisted Kines with a performance of "The Bard of Armagh."

== Scheduling ==
This 15-minute program was broadcast on Tuesdays from 1 July to 14 October 1958, normally at 5:15 p.m. The debut was broadcast at 4:15 p.m. due to Dominion Day programming.
