= Old Testament Tales =

- Genre: Children's television
- Composer: Frank Haworth
- Country of origin: Canada
- Original language: English
- No. of seasons: 1

Production
- Producer: Basil Coleman
- Running time: 15 minutes

Original release
- Network: CBC Television
- Release: 3 January – 28 March 1957

Old Testament Tales is a Canadian children's religious television series that aired on CBC Television in 1957.

== Premise ==
Old Testament stories were portrayed with puppets operated by John Keogh, Linda Keogh, and John Botterel. Clare Slater adapted the stories in what was the first Canadian children's religious television series.

== Scheduling ==
This 15-minute series was broadcast on Thursdays at 5:15 p.m. (Eastern) from 3 January to 28 March 1957.
