= Let's Go to the Museum =

Canadian children's television program

- Genre: Children's television
- Presented by: Robert MacNeil
- Country of origin: Canada
- Original language: English
- No. of seasons: 2

Production
- Producer: Marion Dunn
- Production locations: Ottawa, Ontario, Canada

Original release
- Network: CBC Television
- Release: 5 October 1954 – 18 December 1956

Let's Go to the Museum is a Canadian children's television series that aired on CBC Television from 1954 to 1956.

== Premise ==
Robert MacNeil, later of the PBS NewsHour, hosted this series concerning museums and their artifacts. Episodes were based on location at a national museum in Ottawa, Ontario, Canada.

== Scheduling ==
This half-hour series was broadcast on Tuesdays at 5:00 p.m. from 5 October 1954 to 5 April 1955 for its first season, then in the same time slot for its second season from 2 October to 18 December 1956. Features included demonstrations of how museum staff prepare models of First Nations people, and a location report at the Macoun Field Club.
