= Spotlight on Film =

- Genre: Docuseries
- Presented by: Henning Jacobsen
- Country of origin: Canada
- Original language: English
- No. of seasons: 1
- No. of episodes: 13

Production
- Producer: Ron Meraska
- Running time: 15 minutes

Original release
- Network: CBC Television
- Release: 5 October – 28 December 1969

Spotlight on Film is a Canadian film documentary television program that aired on CBC Television in 1969.

== Premise ==
This program provided an overview of the works of various filmmakers such as Michelangelo Antonioni, Shirley Clarke, Roman Polanski, Alain Resnais, John Schlesinger, Jiri Trnka, Peter Weiss and Mai Zetterling.

== Scheduling ==
This 15-minute program was broadcast Sundays at 1:00 p.m. (Eastern time) from 5 October to 28 December 1969.
