= Ed and Ross =

- Genre: Children's television
- Presented by: Ed McCurdy; Ross Snetsinger
- Country of origin: Canada
- Original language: English
- No. of seasons: 2 (except 1958)

Production
- Producer: John Kennedy
- Running time: 30 minutes

Original release
- Network: CBC Television
- Release: 4 July 1957 – 24 September 1959

Ed and Ross is a Canadian children's television series that aired on CBC Television in 1957 and 1959.

== Premise ==
Ed McCurdy and Ross Snetsinger hosted this series which was geared towards children between age 8 and 14. The series was set in a magic house which featured various people and secret corridors. Guests included circus-style performers such as acrobats and jugglers. Music was performed by McCurdy.

== Scheduling ==
This half-hour series was broadcast on Thursdays at 5:00 p.m. (Eastern) from 4 July to 25 September 1957, then in the same day and time for the second and final season from 2 July to 24 September 1959.
