= Canada Outdoors =

Canadian nature television series

- Genre: Nature documentary
- Presented by: Dan Gibson
- Country of origin: Canada
- Original language: English
- No. of seasons: 1

Production
- Running time: 30 minutes

Original release
- Network: CBC Television
- Release: 5 July – 27 September 1967

Canada Outdoors is a Canadian nature television program that aired on CBC Television in 1967.

== Premise ==
Each episode featured two films on the wilderness covering such topics as birds, canoe travel and northwest Ontario tourism.

== Scheduling ==
This half-hour series was broadcast Wednesdays at 5:30 p.m. (Eastern) from 5 July to 27 September 1967. It was rebroadcast 10:00 a.m. daily from 4 to 8 October 1971.
