= The Other Eye =

Canadian television program

- Genre: Public affairs/Variety
- Created by: Richard Nielsen
- Directed by: Jim Shaw
- Presented by: Rod Coneybeare; Gary Smith; Jean Templeton; Larry Zolf
- Country of origin: Canada
- Original language: English
- No. of seasons: 1

Production
- Producers: Sam Levene; John Ryan
- Running time: 30 minutes

Original release
- Network: CBC Television
- Release: 9 July – 27 August 1967

The Other Eye is a Canadian public affairs and variety television show which aired on CBC Television in 1967.

== Premise ==
This program was an attempt at a late-night talk and music variety show. Its debut episode was broadcast the day after Domnion Day and featured Newfoundland premier Joey Smallwood plus a segment in which Canadian citizens were challenged by questions posed to prospective immigrants at Canadian citizenship court. Series regulars included Henry Cuesta and his trio. The program was created as an entertaining counterpart to The Public Eye.

The program did not continue into the regular season, nor did proposals to establish a similar local late night show for CBLT Toronto, The Local Eye.

== Scheduling ==
This program was broadcast on Sundays at 10:00 p.m. from 2 July to 27 August 1967. Episodes were 30 minutes except for the hour-long debut broadcast.
