= Newsfile =

- Genre: Documentary
- Presented by: Lloyd Robertson
- Country of origin: Canada
- Original language: English
- No. of seasons: 1

Production
- Executive producer: Angus McLellan
- Production location: Toronto
- Editor: Dave Quance
- Running time: 30 minutes

Original release
- Network: CBC Television
- Release: 15 February – 21 June 1973

Newsfile is a Canadian documentary television series that aired on CBC Television in 1973.

== Premise ==
This Toronto-produced series with host Lloyd Robertson featured documentary reports on various subjects including youth unemployment, planning for the 1976 Summer Olympics in Montreal, land claims by the First Nations in the Northwest Territories and a conference between federal and provincial governments.

== Scheduling ==
This half-hour program was broadcast on alternate Thursdays at 10:30 p.m. (Eastern) from 15 February to 21 June 1973. Encounter aired on other Thursdays.
