= How It Happens =

- Genre: Educational programming
- Presented by: Alysia Pascaris; Danny McIlravey
- Country of origin: Canada
- Original language: English
- No. of seasons: 1
- No. of episodes: 10

Production
- Producer: Rena Edgley
- Running time: 30 minutes

Original release
- Network: CBC Television
- Release: 23 October – 25 December 1973

How It Happens is a Canadian science television program that aired on CBC Television in 1973.

== Premise ==
This series on science was geared towards youth, exploring questions such as how jet plane avoids colliding or how spaghetti is made.

== Scheduling ==
This half-hour series was broadcast on Tuesdays at 5:00 p.m. (Eastern) from 23 October to 25 December 1973. It was rebroadcast in the same time slot from July to September 1974 and from July to September 1975.
