= The Road to Adjustment =

- Genre: Documentary
- Country of origin: Canada
- Original language: English
- No. of seasons: 1
- No. of episodes: 4

Production
- Producer: Murray Creed
- Running time: 30 minutes

Original release
- Network: CBC Television
- Release: 2 March – 30 March 1960

The Road To Adjustment is a Canadian documentary television miniseries that aired on CBC Television in 1960.

== Premise ==
Episodes concerned challenges faced by the Canadian farming and fishing industries. Keith Russell was the series researcher.

== Scheduling ==
The half-hour series was broadcast on Wednesdays at 10:30 p.m. (Eastern) as follows:

1. 2 March 1960: "The Old Road", concerned small-scale farming, featuring a panel discussion and a filmed segment of Earle Hooker, a farmer from Quebec
2. 9 March 1960: "The Detour: The Farmer Has Moved Out", highlighted the need for farmers to develop new areas of business for additional income
3. 16 March 1960: "The Throughway" concerned modern developments in farming
4. 23 March 1960: "The Seventh Wave" focused on the Atlantic fishing industry, featuring interview segments with fishermen from Port Bickerton, Nova Scotia
