= Switzer Unlimited =

Canadian talk show television series

- Genre: Talk show
- Presented by: Bob Switzer
- Country of origin: Canada
- Original language: English
- No. of seasons: 1

Production
- Production location: Vancouver
- Running time: 60 minutes

Original release
- Network: CBC Television
- Release: 2 August – 3 September 1976

Switzer Unlimited is a Canadian talk show that aired on CBC Television in 1976.

== Premise ==
This program was broadcast as a temporary replacement for The Bob McLean Show from August, following the conclusion of CBC's broadcast efforts for the 1976 Summer Olympics in Montreal.

Regular participants included Bill Alexander (artist), Guy Bannerman (broadcaster), Phyllis Coleman (yoga), Doug Collins (journalist), Mike Halleran (environment), Uno Langman (antiques), Barry Leach (environment), Peter Lenak (lawyer), John Lindenlaub (outdoor cooking), Hannah Smith (graphology) and David Tarrant (gardening).

== Scheduling ==
This hour-long program was broadcast Monday through Friday at 12:00 p.m. (Eastern time) from 2 August to 3 September 1976.
