= Summer Close-Up =

Canadian television program

- Genre: current affairs
- Presented by: Mary Lou Finlay; Dan Turner
- Country of origin: Canada
- Original language: English
- No. of seasons: 1

Production
- Producer: Robert Ennis
- Running time: 30 minutes

Original release
- Network: CBC Television
- Release: 26 May – 4 August 1977

Summer Close-Up is a Canadian current affairs television program that aired on CBC Television in 1977.

== Premise ==
Episodes consisted of a mix of public affairs content such as documentaries and studio interviews. These mostly addressed subjects of national concern such as the Royal Commission on Violence in the Communication Industry, fishing quotas and the prison system. The series included biographical segments featuring Michel Brault (film producer), David Crombie (then mayor of Toronto) and Jacques Dextraze (military chief).

== Scheduling ==
This half-hour program was broadcast on Thursdays at 9:00 p.m. (Eastern time) from 26 May to 4 August 1977.
