= Outlook (1960 TV program) =

- Presented by: Arnold Edinborough
- Country of origin: Canada
- Original language: English
- No. of seasons: 1

Production
- Producer: Gordon Babineau

Original release
- Network: CBC Television
- Release: 3 July – 25 September 1960

Outlook is a Canadian current affairs television program that aired on CBC Television in 1960.

== Premise ==
This program featured political topics such as the campaign towards the 1960 United States presidential election, speculation on the Canadian economy and the effects of the press on the political system. Episodes also concerned international situations in Africa, Latin America and the West Indies. Saturday Night editor Arnold Edinborough was host of this interim program between seasons of Fighting Words.

== Production ==
Gordon Babineau produced this program, with assistance from Catherine MacIver.

== Scheduling ==
This half-hour program was broadcast on Sundays at 10:30 p.m. (Eastern) from 3 July to 25 September 1960.
