= Prairie Spotlight =

- Genre: Current affairs
- Written by: Norman Bortnick
- Presented by: Joe Mauro
- Country of origin: Canada
- Original language: English
- No. of seasons: 1

Production
- Producer: Hugh Edmonds
- Running time: 30 minutes

Original release
- Network: CBC Television
- Release: 1 July – 14 October 1964

Prairie Spotlight is a Canadian current affairs television program that aired on CBC Television in 1964.

== Premise ==
This Winnipeg-produced program featured topics concerning western Canada such as the economy, housing, and tourism. In late 1964, it became part of CBC's Across Canada series.

== Scheduling ==
This half-hour program was broadcast on Wednesdays at 6:30 p.m. (Eastern) from 1 July to 14 October 1964.
