= Quelque Show =

Canadian talk show television series

- Genre: Talk show
- Presented by: Nick Auf der Maur; Les Nirenberg
- Country of origin: Canada
- Original language: English
- No. of seasons: 1

Production
- Producers: Nick Auf der Maur; Les Nirenberg
- Production location: Montreal
- Running time: 30 minutes

Original release
- Network: CBC Television
- Release: 5 January – 23 March 1975

Quelque Show is a Canadian talk show which aired on CBC Television in 1975.

== Premise ==
Episodes featured commentary on various topics by members of the public as recorded on location in Montreal.

== Scheduling ==
This series was broadcast Sundays at 3:30 p.m. from 5 January to 23 March 1975.

== See also ==
- Speakers' Corner
