= Theme in Seven =

Canadian music history television program

- Genre: Music history
- Presented by: Jean de Rimanoczy
- Country of origin: Canada
- Original language: English
- No. of seasons: 1
- No. of episodes: 7

Production
- Producer: Daryl Duke
- Running time: 30 minutes

Original release
- Network: CBC Television
- Release: 8 August – 18 September 1955

Theme in Seven is a Canadian music history television program which aired on CBC Television in 1955.

== Premise ==
Jean de Rimanoczy, a violinist from Vancouver, hosted this program on the history of classical music and its related instruments. Subjects included chamber music, the effects of jazz on contemporary music and the romantic music period.

== Scheduling ==
This half-hour program was broadcast Mondays at 9:30 p.m. from 8 August to 12 September 1955, with a final episode on 18 September 1955 at 6:45 p.m.
