= Five Years in the Life =

- Genre: Documentary
- Narrated by: Allan McFee
- Theme music composer: Bob Ruzicka
- Composer: Ben McPeek
- Country of origin: Canada
- Original language: English
- No. of seasons: 4

Production
- Executive producer: Peter Kelly (1971–1972)
- Producers: Michael Rothery (1968–1971); Nick Bakyta
- Running time: 30 minutes

Original release
- Network: CBC Television
- Release: 28 June 1968 – 4 September 1972

Five Years in the Life is a Canadian documentary television series which aired on CBC Television from 1968 to 1972.

== Premise ==
The lives of selected Canadian families were profiled in this series with the initial intent to revisit them five years later. However, public interest in the series caused the CBC to revisit featured families more frequently and to profile additional families. Profiled people included an architect, an Inuk artist, a Jamaican immigrant and a lighthouse operator from Newfoundland. The various segments were produced with numerous directors.

== Scheduling ==
This half-hour series was broadcast for five seasons as follows (times are Eastern):

Day	Time	Season run
Fridays	8:30 p.m.	28 June to 30 August 1968
Mondays	8:30 p.m.	30 June to 1 September 1969
Mondays	8:30 p.m.	6 July to 7 September 1970
Thursdays	10:00 p.m.	1 July to 9 September 1971
Mondays	7:30 p.m.	3 July to 4 September 1972
