= The Passionate Canadians =

- Genre: Documentary
- Presented by: Harry Adaskin
- Country of origin: Canada
- Original language: English
- No. of episodes: 2

Production
- Producer: Nancy Ryley
- Cinematography: Ken Gregg
- Running time: 60 minutes

Original release
- Network: CBC Television
- Release: 26 October – 2 November 1977

The Passionate Canadians is a Canadian television documentary miniseries that aired on CBC Television in 1977.

== Premise ==
This series profiles the Group of Seven and Tom Thomson, prominent Canadian artists of the early 20th century. The first hour features the artists during the 1910s, including their work in the Ontario wilderness and the effects of Thomson's 1917 death. The next part covers the following decade, with the formal establishment of the Group of Seven until its breakup in 1930. Production of the documentary was conducted over two years.
