= A City Story =

- Country of origin: Canada
- Original language: English
- No. of seasons: 1

Original release
- Network: CBC Television
- Release: 12 October – 22 October 1971

A City Story is a Canadian documentary television series that aired on CBC Television in 1971.

== Premise ==
Sixteen Canadian cities were featured in this series of documentaries, originally produced in 1967. The films were first broadcast locally in Toronto and Montreal in 1968, only reaching the national network in October 1971 when these were broadcast at random times.
