= Come Dance with Us =

1960 Canadian children's television miniseries

- Written by: Marion Waldman
- Country of origin: Canada
- Original language: English
- No. of seasons: 1
- No. of episodes: 6

Production
- Producer: Neil Harris
- Production location: Winnipeg
- Running time: 30 minutes

Original release
- Network: CBC Television
- Release: 18 May – 22 June 1960

Come Dance with Us is a Canadian children's television miniseries that aired on CBC Television in 1960.

== Premise ==
Each episode concerned a particular theme such as the spring season, with related dance performances by the Royal Winnipeg Ballet accompanied by film and musical segments. Bob McMullin (Music Break, Altogether) was the series musical director while Brian Macdonald was choreographer.

== Scheduling ==
This half-hour series was broadcast on Wednesdays at 5:00 p.m. (Eastern time) from 18 May to 22 June 1960.
