= Their Springtime of Life =

- Genre: Documentary
- Directed by: Frank Williams
- Narrated by: Bill Hawes; Frank Williams
- Country of origin: Canada
- Original language: English
- No. of seasons: 1
- No. of episodes: 4

Production
- Producer: Frank Williams
- Production location: CBC Montreal
- Editor: Armand Fortin
- Running time: 60 minutes

Original release
- Network: CBC Television
- Release: 22 August – 12 September 1972

Their Springtime of Life is a Canadian documentary television miniseries that aired on CBC Television in 1972.

== Premise ==
This documentary series concerned the Canadian Army during the two world wars. Sources for footage included the National Film Board of Canada and various foreign sources.

== Scheduling ==
This hour-long series was broadcast on Tuesdays at 10:00 p.m. (Eastern time) from 22 August to 12 September 1972.

=== Episodes ===
1. 22 August 1972: World War I
2. 29 August 1972: the years between the world wars (until World War II)
3. 5 September 1972: World War II – Italian campaigns
4. 12 September 1972: World War II – European campaigns
