= Memorandum on a Frozen Ark =

- Genre: documentary
- Presented by: Nelson Davis; Brian Smyth
- Country of origin: Canada
- Original language: English
- No. of seasons: 1

Production
- Producer: Bob Gardiner
- Production location: Ottawa
- Running time: 30 minutes

Original release
- Network: CBC Television
- Release: 6 July – 17 August 1970

Memorandum on a Frozen Ark is a Canadian documentary television miniseries that explored the state of Canada's museums. It aired on CBC Television in 1970.

== Premise ==
This Ottawa-produced series was concerned with the effects of a federal government decision to reallocate funds from its National Museums of Canada Corporation to the construction of the National Arts Centre. The first episode provided an explanation and rationale for museums. The following episodes explored the National Gallery of Canada, the Museum of Science and Technology, the Royal Ontario Museum, the Museum of Man, the Museum of Natural Sciences and the Canadian War Museum. Series hosts were Brian Smyth and Nelson Davis.

== Scheduling ==
This half-hour series was broadcast on Mondays at 10:30 p.m. (Eastern) from 6 July to 17 August 1970.
