= NFB Film Can =

- Genre: Short film
- Country of origin: Canada
- Original language: English
- No. of seasons: 1

Production
- Running time: 30 minutes

Original release
- Network: CBC Television
- Release: 4 April – 5 September 1979

NFB Film Can is a Canadian film anthology television series that was broadcast on CBC Television in 1979.

== Premise ==
Various National Film Board of Canada short films were presented in this series geared towards young audiences. Some titles included "The Sand Castle" (Co Hoedeman), "Soap Box Derby" (André Melançon director) and "The Ride" (Gerald Potterton director). Animated works were also seen during the series.

== Scheduling ==
The half-hour series was broadcast on Wednesdays at 4:30 p.m. (Eastern) from 4 April to 5 September 1979.
