= Concerning Women =

- Genre: Women's interest
- Presented by: Judy Piercey
- Narrated by: Judy Piercey
- Country of origin: Canada
- Original language: English
- No. of seasons: 1
- No. of episodes: 17

Production
- Executive producer: Kay Smith
- Running time: 30 minutes

Original release
- Network: CBC Television
- Release: 23 May – 12 September 1976

Concerning Women is a Canadian women's interest television series that aired on CBC Television in 1976.

== Premise ==
This series was compiled in Vancouver from a selection of broadcasts from that city and from Halifax and Ottawa. Subjects included children's views of women, women's mental health, single women, women in sports and a profile of 57 women Alcan smelter employees at Kitimat, British Columbia. Concerning Women was produced in recognition of International Women's Year.

== Scheduling ==
This half-hour series was broadcast Sundays at 12:30 p.m. (Eastern) from 23 May to 12 September 1976.
