= The Peggy Neville Show =

Canadian music variety television series

- Genre: Variety show
- Country of origin: Canada
- Original language: English
- No. of seasons: 2

Production
- Producer: Ray McConnell
- Production location: Winnipeg
- Running time: 15 minutes

Original release
- Network: CBC Television
- Release: 5 January 1966 – 28 June 1967

The Peggy Neville Show is a Canadian music variety show that aired on CBC Television from 1966 to 1967.

== Premise ==
Peggy Neville (Red River Jamboree) hosted this entertainment series from Winnipeg.

Guest artists included Lenny Breau, Ed Evanko, Rich Little and Ray St. Germain. Kellogg's was a primary series sponsor.

Bob McMullin led the house band and arranged music for the program .

== Scheduling ==
This 15-minute program was broadcast on Wednesdays at 7:45 p.m. from 5 January to 29 June 1966 and for a full season on Wednesdays at 7:30 p.m. from 5 October 1966 to 28 June 1967 at which time CBC cancelled the series.
