= Summerscope =

Canadian current affairs television program

- Genre: Current affairs
- Presented by: Naomi Loeb
- Country of origin: Canada
- Original language: English
- No. of seasons: 1
- No. of episodes: 12

Production
- Running time: 30 minutes

Original release
- Network: CBC Television
- Release: 5 June – 11 September 1980

Summerscope is a Canadian current affairs television program that aired on CBC Television in 1980.

== Premise ==
This program consisted of reports and discussion on topics such as Canadian federalism and the Constitution, the restoration and maintenance of old buildings, the presence of Nazi war criminals in Canada, the McDonald Royal Commission of Inquiry into Certain Activities of the RCMP and the Canada Bank Act.

== Scheduling ==
This half-hour program was broadcast Thursdays at 10:00 p.m. from 5 June to 11 September 1980.
