= The Fit Stop =

- Genre: Physical fitness
- Presented by: Jan Tennant; Clarke Wallace
- Country of origin: Canada
- Original language: English
- No. of seasons: 2

Production
- Executive producer: Ray Hazzan
- Producer: John Ryan
- Running time: 30 minutes

Original release
- Network: CBC Television
- Release: 5 February 1974 – 15 April 1975

The Fit Stop is a Canadian children's physical fitness television series that aired on CBC Television from 1974 to 1975.

== Premise ==
This series promoted physical activities for children featuring guests from the sports and fitness fields. Inexpensive sports were featured during the series, and a course of increasingly strenuous exercises was introduced in the second season. Episodes included talking puppet characters by Noreen Young such as a football helmet, hockey helmet, a knapsack, a linament bottle and an old shoe.

== Scheduling ==
This half-hour series was broadcast Tuesdays at 4:30 p.m. (Eastern) in two seasons, from 5 February to 4 June 1974 and from 31 December 1974 to 15 April 1975.
