= Music for a Sunday Afternoon =

Canadian classical music television program

- Genre: Classical music
- Country of origin: Canada
- Original language: English
- No. of seasons: 1

Production
- Executive producer: Franz Kraemer
- Running time: 60 minutes

Original release
- Network: CBC Television
- Release: 5 February – 26 March 1967

Music for a Sunday Afternoon is a Canadian classical music television program that aired on CBC Television in 1967.

== Premise ==
This classical music program featured mostly Canadian productions except for two episodes from the BBC.

The BBC episodes were "The Golden Ring" (broadcast 5 February 1967) and "Double Concerto" (17 February 1967). The first featured a recording of Richard Wagner's music and was previously aired on CBC's Festival. "Double Concerto" followed pianists Daniel Barenboim and Vladimir Ashkenazy as they practiced and performed a Mozart concerto.

Canadian-produced episodes included:

- a Bernardo Segall recital of Chopin's work
- Glenn Gould performing Beethoven, marking 140 years after the composer's death
- Cavalleria rusticana (Jean-Ives Landry producer), the opera by Mascagni
- an Isaac Stern recital (Pierre Morin producer)
- Les Sylphides performed by Les Grands Ballets Canadiens,

== Scheduling ==
This hour-long series was broadcast Sundays at 3:00 p.m. (Eastern) from 5 February to 26 March 1967.
