= People in Parties =

- Genre: Panel discussion
- Country of origin: Canada
- Original language: English
- No. of seasons: 1
- No. of episodes: 2

Production
- Producer: Patrick Watson
- Running time: 30 minutes

Original release
- Network: CBC Television
- Release: 26 November – 2 December 1960

People in Parties is a Canadian two-part political television special that aired on CBC Television in 1960.

== Premise ==
The series was a discussion of Canadian politics hosted by Davidson Dunton with a panel consisting of Queen's University political science professor John Meisel with Ottawa newspaper correspondents Clark Davey (Globe and Mail) and Tom Gould (Victoria Daily Times). The broadcasts included interview segments with Canadian members of Parliament.

== Scheduling ==
- 26 November 1960, 10:30 p.m. (Eastern): "The Golden Road To Power"
- 2 December 1960, 10:30 p.m. (Eastern): "Who's Running The Country?"
