= A Date with Frosia =

Canadian musical television series

- Genre: Music
- Starring: Frosia Gregory
- Country of origin: Canada
- Original language: English
- No. of seasons: 1

Production
- Producer: Harvey Hart
- Running time: 30 minutes

Original release
- Network: CBC Television
- Release: 2 May – 11 July 1954

A Date With Frosia is a Canadian musical television series that aired on CBC Television in 1954.

== Premise ==
The series featured music performances from such artists as Lois and David Adams, Dorothy Bromley (keyboard), Donna Hossack (harp), National Ballet dancers, female quartet Enchanted Strings and a female quintet

== Scheduling ==
The series aired each Sunday at 7:30 pm (Eastern) as a mid-year replacement for CGE Showtime.
