= Album of History =

Canadian historical television miniseries

- Genre: historical
- Written by: Tommy Tweed
- Narrated by: Tommy Tweed; Gordie Tapp (last episode)
- Country of origin: Canada
- Original language: English
- No. of seasons: 1

Production
- Executive producer: Thom Benson
- Producer: Loyd Brydon
- Running time: 30 minutes

Original release
- Network: CBC Television
- Release: 23 June – 11 August 1967

Album of History is a Canadian historical television miniseries that aired on CBC Television in 1967.

== Premise ==
This seven-episode series featured photographs from historical archives throughout Canada. Subjects included British Columbia's history, the First Nations of western Canada, the North-West Rebellion, the construction of the Canadian Pacific Railway, prairie immigrants, cowboys and the development of western communities.

== Production ==
Music was under the direction of Ricky Hyslop. Special research was conducted by Lester Machan. Series writer Tommy Tweed narrated all episodes except the last in which Gordie Tapp provided the voiceover.

== Scheduling ==
The half-hour episodes aired on Fridays at 8:00 p.m. (Eastern) from 23 June to 11 August 1967.
