= The Men and the Issues =

- Genre: current affairs
- Country of origin: Canada
- Original language: English
- No. of seasons: 1
- No. of episodes: 4

Production
- Running time: 30 minutes

Original release
- Network: CBC Television
- Release: 19 March – 26 March 1963

The Men and the Issues is a Canadian current affairs television miniseries that aired on CBC Television in 1963.

== Premise ==
This miniseries featured interviews with the federal political party leaders prior to the 1963 federal election: Lester B. Pearson, John Diefenbaker, Tommy Douglas and Robert N. Thompson. The interviews were conducted by Clive Baxter, Mark Harrison, Arthur Lower, James McCook and Robert McKenzie.

== Scheduling ==
Half-hour episodes were broadcast on the evenings of 19, 20, 25 and 26 March 1963.
