= The World of Man =

Canadian youth nature documentary television series

- Genre: Documentary
- Country of origin: Canada
- Original language: English
- No. of seasons: 4 (except 1971)

Production
- Running time: 30 minutes

Original release
- Network: CBC Television
- Release: 3 April 1970 – 20 September 1975

The World of Man is a Canadian nature documentary television series that aired on CBC Television from 1970 to 1975.

== Premise ==
This series featured industry and agriculture in various nations, describing natural resources and human life throughout the world. Episodes featured resource industries such as Australian wool, Argentine ranching, East African diamond mining, East German farming, Egyptian sugar, Finnish lumber, Japanese farming, Libyan oil, Tanzanian coffee and Thailand rice.

== Scheduling ==
The first season of this half-hour series was broadcast Fridays at 4:30 p.m. (Eastern) from 3 April to 25 September 1970. Its next broadcast was two years later, from April to August 1972. In the three following seasons, it aired between July and September each year, until the final broadcast on 20 September 1975.
