= The Restless Wave =

- Genre: Historical documentary
- Presented by: Liston McIlhagga
- Country of origin: Canada
- Original language: English
- No. of seasons: 1
- No. of episodes: 3

Production
- Producer: Frank Williams
- Production location: Montreal
- Running time: 60 minutes

Original release
- Network: CBC Television
- Release: 2 August – 16 August 1970

The Restless Wave is a Canadian historical documentary television miniseries that aired on CBC Television in 1970.

== Premise ==
This series was a documentary of the Royal Canadian Navy. Episodes included interviews as conducted by Bill Herbert and Sheridan Nelson, supplemented by film materials from Canadian and European sources.

== Scheduling ==
This series was broadcast on Sundays at 4:00 p.m. Eastern from 2 to 16 August 1970.

=== Episodes ===
1. This opening episode featured the navy's history from its 1910 inception until World War II; one of the first recruits, Rear Admiral Victor G. Brodeur, was featured in an interview
2. This episode concentrated on early World War II activity until 1943
3. The concluding episode concerned the final years of World War II and events towards the amalgamation of the Navy into the Canadian Armed Forces
