= Life and the Land =

- Genre: Informational
- Country of origin: Canada
- Original language: English
- No. of seasons: 1

Production
- Producers: Rena Elmer; Larry Gosnell
- Running time: 30 minutes

Original release
- Network: CBC Television
- Release: 2 April – 31 December 1966

Related
- Countrytime

Life and the Land is a Canadian informational television program on gardening and agriculture that aired on CBC Television in 1966.

== Premise ==
This series, previously produced as Countrytime, featured stories of national and regional scope. Each episode was structured in two parts. The first part contained general agriculture-related items which was produced at various CBC production centres across Canada and which aired nationally. The second part focused on local gardening, produced and broadcast within each region.

Regular experts included Earl Cox (Ontario, Quebec), Bernard Moore (Pacific/British Columbia), Gordon Warren (Atlantic) and Stan Westway (Prairies).

== Scheduling ==
This half-hour series was broadcast on Saturdays at 6:00 p.m. (Eastern) from 2 April to 31 December 1966.
