= Theologo '67 =

- Genre: {{plainlist: Documentary; Panel discussion; }}
- Country of origin: Canada
- Original language: English
- No. of seasons: 1
- No. of episodes: 4

Production
- Executive producer: Leo Rampen
- Producer: John Ryan
- Running time: 30 minutes

Original release
- Network: CBC Television
- Release: 28 July – 25 August 1968

Theologo '67 is a Canadian documentary television miniseries that aired on CBC Television in 1968.

== Premise ==
This series featured the work of a Toronto theological congress during mid-1967. Subjects of concern included Christian unity, conscience, contraception, poverty, war and involvement in the world. It was created as a special miniseries by the producers of CBC's Man Alive series.

== Scheduling ==
This half-hour series was broadcast on Sundays at 5:00 p.m. as follows:

- 28 July 1968 - debut episode
- 4 August 1968 - Christian Unity
- 11 August 1968 - Person and Conscience
- 18 August 1968 - pre-empted for CPGA Golf
- 25 August 1968 - Poverty, War, Birth Control - discussion with Elizabeth Anscombe (Oxford University), E. Dawne Jubb (gynecologist) and Lawrence Lynch (University of Toronto).
