= The Man from Tomorrow =

Canadian television series

- Genre: Science fiction adventure
- Written by: Kitty Marcuse
- Starring: Stefan Gair; Michael Morrow
- Country of origin: Canada
- Original language: English
- No. of seasons: 1

Production
- Producer: Jorn Winther
- Production location: Vancouver
- Running time: 15 minutes

Original release
- Network: CBC Television
- Release: 7 July – 6 October 1958

The Man From Tomorrow is a Canadian science fiction adventure television series which aired on CBC Television in 1958.

== Premise ==
The lead character, Melpar, has travelled back in time to meet a pair of boys in the 1950s. Their adventures include a trip to Mars.

== Scheduling ==
The 15-minute episodes were broadcast Mondays at 5:00 p.m. (Eastern time) from 7 July to 6 October 1958.
