= See for Yourself =

- Genre: Children's television
- Presented by: Ross Snetsinger
- Country of origin: Canada
- Original language: English
- No. of seasons: 1

Production
- Running time: 30 minutes

Original release
- Network: CBC Television
- Release: 15 October 1959 – 31 March 1960

See for Yourself is a Canadian children's television series that aired on CBC Television from 1959 to 1960.

== Premise ==
This series featured arts, crafts, music, and various other subject matter presented for children. It was hosted by Ross Snetsinger who also operated a puppet named Foster.

== Scheduling ==
This half-hour series was broadcast on Thursdays at 4:30 p.m. (Eastern time) from 15 October 1959 to 31 March 1960.
