= Cartoon Storybook =

Canadian children's television series

- Genre: Children's television
- Presented by: Ross Snetsinger
- Country of origin: Canada
- Original language: English
- No. of seasons: 1

Production
- Running time: 15 minutes

Original release
- Network: CBC Television
- Release: 7 April – 30 June 1959

Cartoon Storybook is a Canadian children's television series which aired on CBC Television in 1959.

== Premise ==
European animated films were the focus of this series hosted by Ross Snetsinger and Foster, his hand puppet.

== Scheduling ==
This 15-minute series was broadcast on Tuesdays at 4:45 p.m. (Eastern) from 7 April to 23 June 1959 with a final episode on 30 June 1959 at 5:15 p.m..
