= Astronomy Today =

Canadian television series

- Country of origin: Canada
- Original language: English
- No. of seasons: 1

Production
- Producer: Gene Lawrence

Original release
- Network: CBC Television
- Release: 24 May – 16 August 1959

Astronomy Today is a Canadian science television series that aired on CBC Television in 1959.

== Premise ==
F. A. Kaempffer, a University of British Columbia physics professor, presents various lectures during this series which concerns modern scientific theories and how these relate to historical theories. These are accompanied by photographs and graphics from the Dominion Astrophysical Observatory.

== Production ==
Gene Lawrence produced Astronomy Today in Vancouver.

== Scheduling ==
The half-hour series aired Sundays at 3:30 p.m. (Eastern) from 24 May to 16 August 1959.
