= Let's Make Music (TV program) =

Canadian children's television program

- Genre: Children's television
- Presented by: David Ouchterlony
- Country of origin: Canada
- Original language: English
- No. of seasons: 1

Production
- Producer: Peggy Nairn
- Production location: Toronto
- Running time: 30 minutes

Original release
- Network: CBC Television
- Release: 27 September 1953 – 25 May 1954

Let's Make Music is a Canadian children's music television program that aired on CBC Television from 1953 to 1954.

== Premise ==
This children's program provided education on music appreciation and theory. David Ouchterlony, from The Royal Conservatory of Music, hosted this program and a later radio program of classical music on CFRB Toronto.

== Scheduling ==
This half-hour program was broadcast on Tuesdays at 5:00 p.m. from 27 September to 3 October 1953, then moved to a Wednesday 5:00 p.m. time slot from 21 October 1953 to 25 May 1954.
