= Outlook (1966 TV series) =

- Genre: Short film
- Country of origin: Canada
- Original language: English
- No. of seasons: 1

Production
- Running time: 30 minutes

Original release
- Network: CBC Television
- Release: 8 July – 30 September 1966

Outlook is a Canadian short film television series that aired on CBC Television in 1966.

== Premise ==
This series featured short films from sources such as the BBC and the National Film Board of Canada. Some of these included:

- "The End of Summer" (Michel Brault director)
- "Fabienne" (Jacques Godbout)
- "Stampede" (Claude Fournier director), featuring the Calgary Stampede
- "They Called It Fireproof" (Roger Blais director) concerning building safety
- "Toronto Jazz" (Don Owen)
- "You're No Good" (Jean Roy director)

== Scheduling ==
This half-hour series was broadcast Fridays at 5:30 p.m. from 8 July to 30 September 1966.
