= The Great Canadian Escape =

- Genre: Outdoor instructional
- Presented by: Russ Thornberry; John Wells
- Country of origin: Canada
- Original language: English
- No. of seasons: 1
- No. of episodes: 8

Production
- Production location: Edmonton
- Running time: 30 minutes

Original release
- Network: CBC Television
- Release: 16 July – 17 September 1977

The Great Canadian Escape is a Canadian outdoor educational television miniseries that aired on CBC Television in 1977.

== Premise ==
This series demonstrated techniques for various outdoors activities such as backpacking, camping, canoeing and fishing. John Wells, a broadcaster, hosted this series with Edmonton Journal columnist Russ Thornberry.

== Scheduling ==
This half-hour series was broadcast on Saturdays at 4:00 p.m. from 16 July to 17 September 1977.
