= Howard Presents =

- Genre: Children's television
- Directed by: Sandy Stewart
- Presented by: Michele Finney
- Country of origin: Canada
- Original language: English
- No. of seasons: 1
- No. of episodes: 9

Production
- Producer: Sandy Stewart
- Running time: 30 minutes

Original release
- Network: CBC Television
- Release: 28 August – 8 September 1978

Related
- Razzle Dazzle

Howard Presents is a Canadian children's television series that aired on CBC Television in 1978.

== Premise ==
This series reunited Razzle Dazzle stars Michele Finney and puppet Howard the Turtle. Episodes featured serials such as Trail Of The Royal Mounted, news items and old films.

== Scheduling ==
This half-hour series was broadcast on weekdays at 4:00 p.m. (Eastern) from 28 August to 8 September 1978.
