= Colombo Quotes =

- Genre: Quiz show
- Presented by: John Robert Colombo
- Country of origin: Canada
- Original language: English
- No. of seasons: 1

Production
- Producer: Richard Donovan
- Running time: 30 minutes

Original release
- Network: CBC Television
- Release: 2 April – 8 June 1978

Colombo Quotes is a Canadian quiz and panel television program that aired on CBC Television in 1978.

== Premise ==
In the quiz show portion of each episode, secondary school students were to indicate the person who made a given quotation. This was followed by a general discussion of the quotation in question. Episodes were recorded in various Canadian cities.

== Scheduling ==
This half-hour series was broadcast on Sundays at 12:00 noon (Eastern time) from 2 April to 4 June 1978. Each episode was rebroadcast the following Thursday at 4:00 p.m. during this time.

== See also ==
- Fighting Words
