= The Inventors (Canadian TV program) =

Canadian science history television program

- Genre: Biography
- Presented by: Bob Fortune
- Country of origin: Canada
- Original language: English
- No. of seasons: 1

Production
- Producer: Al Vitols
- Production location: Vancouver
- Running time: 30 minutes

Original release
- Network: CBC Television
- Release: 15 September – 29 December 1979

The Inventors is a Canadian biography television program that aired on CBC Television in 1979.

== Premise ==
Bob Fortune hosted this Vancouver-produced program featuring the stories of Canadian inventors and their inventions.

== Broadcast ==
This half-hour program was broadcast on Saturdays at 1:30 p.m. (Eastern) from 15 September to 29 December 1979.
