= The College Game =

- Genre: Sports
- Presented by: Doug Saunders
- Country of origin: Canada
- Original language: English
- No. of seasons: 1
- No. of episodes: 19

Production
- Producer: Michael Lansbury
- Running time: 2 hours

Original release
- Network: CBC Television
- Release: 24 September 1977 – 19 March 1978

The College Game is a Canadian sports television program that was shown on CBC Television from 1977 to 1978.

== Premise ==
This series featured college-level sports events produced by Jim Spalding. Initial episodes were of football games culminating with the broadcast of the Canadian College Bowl championship on 19 November 1977. Play-by-play was announced by Steve Armitage with commentary by Whit Tucker.

The remaining six broadcasts featured basketball matches produced by Cec Browne. Announcers included Jack Donohue (the national basketball team coach), Ted Reynolds and Don Wittman.

Michael Lansbury, later of TSN, was the series producer.

== Scheduling ==
This two-hour series was broadcast on Saturdays at 2:00 p.m. from 24 September 1977 to 19 March 1978.
