= People Talking Back =

- Genre: Public participation
- Created by: Allan Thomas
- Presented by: Gordon Pinsent (debut); John Hanlon (follow-up)
- Country of origin: Canada
- Original language: English
- No. of seasons: 1
- No. of episodes: 6

Production
- Executive producer: Dolores MacFarlane

Original release
- Network: CBC Television
- Release: 4 February – 22 April 1979

People Talking Back is a Canadian public participation television program that aired on CBC Television in 1979.

== Premise ==
The series began with a special live broadcast Victoria Composite High School in Edmonton. Host Gordon Pinsent invited viewers to call a toll-free number to express their opinions on a variety of topics such as the economy, the labour market and politics. This broadcast also featured discussion among audiences located at studios in each province which were linked via Anik satellite. The broadcast also featured appearances by former CBC journalist Ken Lefolii, futurist Glen Milne and sociologist Tim Tyler. Humorous songs were performed by the troupe Fat Chants, with comedy segments from Catalyst Theatre and clips of street interviews.

Alan M Thomas PhD C.M., President of the Canadian Association for Adult Education (CAAE) developed this project as a reaction to the election of Quebec separatist premier René Lévesque. The CAAE also co-ordinated numerous discussion groups throughout Canada to provide additional channels of public participation for People Talking Back.

The situation was this: Rene Levesque had become Premier of Quebec with his promise to have a referendum as soon as possible. Canada was in tumult. I was in tumult... I believed that Adult Education had a role in the process, and never faltered from that belief.

— Alan Thomas, CAAE President,

John Hanlon hosted five follow-up broadcasts in early 1979 to provide the results of viewer feedback on particular subject areas.

== Reception ==
Viewers who dialled the toll-free number in the opening telecast saturated the bank of 28 telephones in the Edmonton studio within 30 seconds. An estimated 2000 calls were received from the estimated 1.5 million viewers who watched the debut telecast.

Shortly after the telecast, executive producer Dolores MacFarlane was quoted in reports that "satellite went on the blink" while noting a concern that viewpoints from Quebec received a disproportionately small amount of air time. Telesat responded that there were no satellite failures and that it had transmitted 56 minutes of signal from Quebec to the Edmonton broadcast control centre.

== Scheduling ==
The three-hour premiere episode was broadcast 4 February 1979 from 8:00 p.m. Eastern. The half-hour follow-up programmes were broadcast on selected Sundays as follows:

Date	Time
25 February 1979	1:00 p.m.
11 March 1979	1:00 p.m.
25 March 1979	4:30 p.m.
8 April 1979	1:00 p.m.
22 April 1979	4:30 p.m.
