= Regional File =

- Genre: Documentary
- Country of origin: Canada
- Original language: English
- No. of seasons: 1
- No. of episodes: 6

Production
- Running time: 30 minutes

Original release
- Network: CBC Television
- Release: 5 June – 10 July 1975

Regional File is a Canadian documentary television miniseries that aired on CBC Television in 1975.

== Premise ==
Documentaries produced in various Canadian regions were featured in this miniseries.

== Scheduling ==
This half-hour series was broadcast Thursdays at 10:30 p.m. from 5 June to 10 July 1975.

== Episodes ==
- "Northwest Quarter" (Mike Halleran producer), from British Columbia, on industry development in the province's northwest
- "What's All The Fuss About?", from Ottawa, concerning substance abuse
- "Sex And Sixteen" (Ian Parker producer), from Toronto, regarding youth and sexuality
- "The Other Side Of The River" (Ian Wiseman producer), from St. John's, concerning the divided Labrador community of North West River
- "Truth And Consequences", from CBC Toronto's The Rogers Report, about lie detection technology
- "Suicide", (Norm Bortnick producer), from Winnipeg
