= Charcoal Chefs =

- Genre: Cooking show
- Country of origin: Canada
- Original language: English
- No. of seasons: 3

Production
- Producer: Ted Benoit
- Production locations: Winnipeg, Manitoba, Canada
- Running time: 30 minutes

Original release
- Network: CBC Television
- Release: 4 July 1976 – 12 August 1978

Charcoal Chefs is a Canadian cooking television series that aired on CBC Television from 1976 to 1978.

== Premise ==
George Knight and Fernie Kirouac hosted this Winnipeg-produced series in which they demonstrated barbecue cooking on location at St. Vital Park.

== Scheduling ==
This half-hour series was broadcast on Sundays at 9:00 a.m. (Eastern) for three seasons: 4 July to 19 September 1976, 21 August to 25 September 1977 and 3 June to 12 August 1978.
