= Kaleidosport =

Canadian sports television program

- Presented by: Lloyd Robertson
- Country of origin: Canada
- Original language: English
- No. of seasons: 6

Production
- Producer: Don Brown
- Running time: 60–120 minutes

Original release
- Network: CBC Television
- Release: 18 February 1967 – 3 September 1972

Kaleidosport is a Canadian sports television program that aired on CBC Television from 1967 to 1972.

== Premise ==
Lloyd Robertson hosted this series that presented various sports events. Its first broadcasts featured summary coverage of the 1967 Canada Winter Games from Quebec City. Each episode could include multiple different sporting events.

== Scheduling ==
This one- to two-hour series was broadcast as follows:

Day	Time	Season run
Saturdays	4:00-5:00 p.m	18 February to 29 April 1967
Saturdays	2:00-4:00 p.m.	6 May to 15 July 1967
Saturdays	2:00-4:00 p.m.	9 December 1967 to 7 September 1968
Saturdays	2:00-4:00 p.m.	4 January to 21 June 1969
Sundays	2:30-4:00 p.m.	29 June to 14 September 1969
Saturdays	3:00-4:00 p.m.	10 January to 2 May 1970
Sundays	2:30-4:00 p.m.	5 April to 13 September 1970
Saturdays	4:00-5:00 p.m.	9 January to 11 April 1971
Sundays	2:30-4:00 p.m.	25 April to 12 September 1971
Sundays	2:30-4:00 p.m.	2 July to 3 September 1972

== See also ==
- Wide World of Sports
