= Hobby Workshop =

Canadian television program

- Genre: Instructional
- Presented by: Tom Martin
- Country of origin: Canada
- Original language: English
- No. of seasons: 2

Production
- Producers: Joanne Hughes; Peggy Nairn
- Running time: 15 minutes

Original release
- Network: CBC Television
- Release: 19 October 1953 – 30 June 1955

Hobby Workshop is a Canadian instructional television program that aired on CBC Television from 1953 to 1955.

== Premise ==
This how-to series demonstrated how to make various objects with basic tools. Host Tom Martin was an art supervisor in Toronto's school system.

== Scheduling ==
This 15-minute series was broadcast at various times (Eastern) as follows:

Day	Time	Season run
Mondays	5:15 p.m.	19 October 1953 to 26 April 1954
Mondays	5:15 p.m.	3 May to 28 June 1954
Mondays	7:15 p.m.	4 July to 20 September 1954
Thursdays	4:45 p.m.	21 October 1954 to 30 June 1955
