= Musical Moods =

Canadian music television program

- Genre: Music
- Presented by: Marsh Phimister
- Country of origin: Canada
- Original language: English
- No. of seasons: 1

Production
- Running time: 30 minutes

Original release
- Network: CBC Television
- Release: 4 March – 10 June 1958

Musical Moods is a Canadian music television program that aired on CBC Television in 1958.

== Premise ==
Eric Wild and his orchestra were featured in this Winnipeg-produced series. Each episode was based on the theme of a specific mood. For example, an episode would be billed as "music in a romantic mood."

== Scheduling ==
This half-hour series was broadcast Tuesdays at 10:30 p.m. (Eastern) from 4 March to 10 June 1958.
