= Sunshine Canada =

Canadian short film television series

- Genre: short film
- Country of origin: Canada
- Original language: English
- No. of seasons: 1

Production
- Running time: 30 minutes
- Production company: National Film Board of Canada

Original release
- Network: CBC Television
- Release: 4 July – 5 September 1967

Sunshine Canada is a Canadian short film television program that aired on CBC Television in 1967.

== Premise ==
This series of National Film Board of Canada films was presented for children in association with the Canadian Centennial. Topics included Frederick Banting and Charles Best's discovery of insulin, the establishment of Montreal, the RCMP Musical Ride and the Saint Lawrence Seaway.

== Scheduling ==
This half-hour program was broadcast on Tuesdays and Thursdays at 5:00 p.m. (Eastern time) from 4 July to 5 September 1967.
