= Stock Car Races =

- Genre: Sports
- Presented by: Dave Price; Don Sims
- Country of origin: Canada
- Original language: English
- No. of seasons: 2

Production
- Producer: George Retzlaff
- Running time: 60 minutes

Original release
- Network: CBC Television
- Release: 8 May 1953 – 6 August 1954

Stock Car Races is a Canadian sports television program that aired on CBC Television in 1953 and 1954.

== Premise ==
For two years, during the annual racing season from May to August, CBC featured remote broadcasts of stock car races from Toronto's Exhibition Place.

== Scheduling ==
This hour-long program was broadcast Fridays at 8:30 p.m. (Eastern) for two seasons, from 8 May to 14 August 1953 and from 28 May to 6 August 1954.
