= Careers to Come =

- Genre: Documentary
- Presented by: Alysia Pascaris
- Country of origin: Canada
- Original language: English
- No. of seasons: 1

Production
- Producer: Rena Edgley
- Running time: 30 minutes

Original release
- Network: CBC Television
- Release: 24 March 1976 – 29 March 1977

Careers to Come is a Canadian documentary television miniseries that aired on CBC Television from 1976 to 1977.

== Premise ==
The series was geared towards female youth to indicate that some previously male-only careers have opened to women.

== Scheduling ==
This half-hour series was broadcast on Wednesdays and Thursdays at 4:30 p.m. (Eastern) from 24 March to 1 April 1976. It was rebroadcast from 15 to 29 March 1977.

== Episodes ==
- "No, Mary Jane. . . You Can't Be A Fireman"
- "Yes, Mary Jane. . . You Can Be A Firefighter"
- "Mary Jane, You Can Be Anything You Want To Be"
