= Star Chart (TV program) =

Canadian music television program

- Genre: music
- Directed by: Michael Watt
- Presented by: Terry David Mulligan
- Country of origin: Canada
- Original language: English
- No. of seasons: 1

Production
- Producer: Ken Gibson
- Running time: 30 minutes
- Production company: Doug Hutton Video

Original release
- Network: CBC Television
- Release: 3 May – 6 September 1980

Star Chart is a Canadian music television program which aired on CBC Television in 1980.

== Premise ==
This Vancouver-produced program featured songs that were listed on the music charts of Canadian Recording Industry Association. Terry David Mulligan hosted this show, which was similar to Mulligan's radio show The Great Canadian Gold Rush.

== Scheduling ==
This half-hour program was broadcast Saturdays at 7:00 p.m. (Eastern) from 3 May to 6 September 1980.
