= The Canadian Farmer =

- Genre: Current affairs
- Country of origin: Canada
- Original language: English
- No. of seasons: 1
- No. of episodes: 3

Original release
- Network: CBC Television
- Release: 4 June – 18 June 1959

The Canadian Farmer is a Canadian current affairs television miniseries that aired on CBC Television in 1959.

== Premise ==
This series temporarily replaced Explorations and featured reports on the state of Canadian farming.

== Scheduling ==
This half-hour miniseries was broadcast on Thursday at 10:00 p.m. (Eastern time) as follows:

1. 4 June 1959: "Farmer on a Tiger", on government policies and farming problems
2. 11 June 1959: "Cow on a Tightrope", describing the process by which milk is provided to consumers
3. 18 June 1959: "Road to Rosetown", which looks at how farming communities have declined as transportation systems have upgraded
