= After Four =

1977 Canadian television series

- Genre: youth music
- Presented by: Jan Tennant; Larry Green
- Country of origin: Canada
- Original language: English
- No. of seasons: 1

Production
- Producer: John Ryan
- Running time: 30 minutes

Original release
- Network: CBC Television
- Release: 3 October – 19 December 1977

After Four is a Canadian youth television series which aired on CBC Television from 1977 to 1978.

== Premise ==
The series was a music-oriented production geared towards teenagers. Hosts Jan Tennant and Larry Green were joined by the Christopher Ward Band.

== Scheduling ==
The series aired on Mondays at 4:00 p.m. (Eastern) It was rebroadcast from 10 April to 26 June 1978 in the same day of week and time.
