= Albert's Place =

Canadian children's television series

- Genre: Children's
- Written by: Kitty Marcuse
- Country of origin: Canada
- Original language: English
- No. of seasons: 1

Production
- Producer: Len Lauk
- Running time: 15 minutes

Original release
- Network: CBC Television
- Release: 1 July – 23 September 1959

Albert's Place is a Canadian children's television series that aired on CBC Television in 1959.

== Premise ==
The series features stories and songs geared toward children, featuring the puppet Albert who lives in an attic where he has books, paints, trunks and other items. Other regulars include Robert Clothier who portrayed a handyman, with John Chappell (folk singer) and Nonie Stewart (storyteller).

== Production ==
Albert's Place was produced in Vancouver by Len Lauk.

== Scheduling ==
The series was broadcast in a 15-minute time slot on Wednesdays at 5:00 p.m. (Eastern) from 1 July to 23 September 1959 as a mid-year programme.
