= The Peppermint Prince =

Canadian children's television series

- Genre: Children's television
- Written by: Kitty Marcuse
- Starring: John Chappell
- Country of origin: Canada
- Original language: English
- No. of seasons: 2

Production
- Producer: Andy Snider
- Production location: Vancouver
- Running time: 15 minutes

Original release
- Network: CBC Television
- Release: 10 May 1956 – 27 September 1957

The Peppermint Prince is a Canadian children's television series that aired on CBC Television from 1956 to 1957.

== Premise ==
Episodes consisted of cartoons and puppetry as hosted by the Peppermint Prince (John Chappell) Dave Orcutt directed the puppetry for the series.

== Scheduling ==
This 15-minute series was broadcast as follows (times in Eastern):

Day	Time	Run	
Friday	4:30 p.m.	10 May 1956	29 June 1956
Monday	5:30 p.m.	2 July 1956	24 September 1956
Monday	5:15 p.m.	1 October 1956	24 June 1957
Friday	5:00 p.m.	5 July 1957	27 September 1957
