= Flight – The Passionate Affair =

- Written by: Patrick Watson
- Narrated by: Patrick Watson
- Country of origin: Canada
- Original language: English
- No. of seasons: 5

Production
- Producer: Cameron Graham
- Running time: 60 minutes

Original release
- Network: CBC Television
- Release: 19 September 1976 – 10 May 1981

Flight – The Passionate Affair is a Canadian documentary television miniseries that aired on CBC Television in 1976.

== Premise ==
Canadian aviation history was featured in this four-part documentary series, written and narrated by Patrick Watson.

== Scheduling ==
The hour-long episodes aired Sundays at 10:00 p.m. (Eastern) from 19 September to 10 October 1976. It was rebroadcast in May 1981. Subjects included the Avro Canada CF-105 Arrow, Billy Bishop, and the development of competing Canadian airlines such as Trans-Canada Air Lines and Canadian Pacific Air Lines.
