= Swingaround =

Canadian children's quiz television series

- Genre: Children's quiz show
- Written by: Ronald Krantz
- Presented by: Lloyd Robertson (1968–69); Trevor Evans (1969); Bill Paul (1969–70)
- Country of origin: Canada
- Original language: English
- No. of seasons: 3

Production
- Producer: Hedley Read
- Running time: 8 minutes (1967–68); 30 minutes (1968–70)

Original release
- Network: CBC Television
- Release: 12 September 1967 – 30 June 1970

Swingaround is a Canadian children's quiz show that aired on CBC Television from 1967 to 1970.

== Premise ==
Contestants in this quiz show were Toronto-area seventh grade school students. Quiz elements included isolation booth questions and "Who Am I?" segments. The National Telephone Quiz segment was introduced in the second season in which the host called a student elsewhere in Canada to participate with a studio team for several questions. Doris Tennant was the program's coordinator.

== Scheduling ==
The program began its first season as an eight-minute segment around 4:50 p.m. (Eastern time) from 12 September 1967. It followed episodes of Barney Boomer which from January 1968 became Upside Town.

Swingaround was lengthened to fill a 30-minute time slot from 26 April 1968, where it aired on Fridays at 4:30 p.m. until 7 June 1968. It moved to Tuesdays at 4:30 p.m. for its second full season from 1 October 1968 to 24 June 1969. Its third and final season ran from 30 September 1969 to 30 June 1970, also in the Tuesday 4:30 p.m. time slot.
