= Hans in the Kitchen =

- Also known as: Good Eating
- Presented by: Hans Fread
- Country of origin: Canada
- Original language: English
- No. of seasons: 1

Production
- Running time: 30 minutes

Original release
- Network: CBC Television
- Release: 22 January 1953 – 18 May 1954

Hans in the Kitchen, initially titled Good Eating, is a Canadian cooking television program that aired on CBC Television from 1953 to 1954.

== Premise ==
Hans Fread, a chef and restaurant owner based in Toronto, hosted this series on European-style cooking.

== Scheduling ==
The half-hour series aired Thursdays at 10:30 p.m. (Eastern) from 22 January to 1 October 1953. It moved to a Tuesday 10:30 p.m. time slot from 6 October 1953 until its last broadcast on 18 May 1954.
