= Barney's Gang =

Canadian children's television series

- Genre: Children's television
- Presented by: Barney Potts
- Country of origin: Canada
- Original language: English
- No. of seasons: 1

Production
- Producer: D. Gillingham
- Running time: 30 minutes

Original release
- Network: CBC Television
- Release: 2 January – 24 September 1958

Barney's Gang is a Canadian children's television series that was shown on CBC Television in 1958.

== Premise ==
This series was produced in Vancouver and hosted by Barney Potts, a singer-comedian. Children were featured in reports of various places in the Vancouver region. Other segments featured children's hobbies and storytelling, such as legends of the First Nations, accompanied by drawings.

== Scheduling ==
This half-hour series was broadcast on Fridays at 5:00 p.m. (Eastern) from 2 May to 24 September 1958.

== Cast ==
Children in the cast included Lynton Gormely, Bruce Jagger, and Bernie Eisenstein.
