= Music to Remember =

- Genre: Music
- Presented by: Lucio Agostini
- Country of origin: Canada
- Original language: English
- No. of seasons: 1

Production
- Producer: Neil Andrews
- Production location: Toronto

Original release
- Network: CBC Television
- Release: 19 April – 24 May 1970

Related
- Collage

Music to Remember is a Canadian music television program that aired on CBC Television in 1970.

== Premise ==
This program featured Lucio Agostini with an orchestra who presented popular and concert songs. Singers Shirley Harmer and Wally Koster were guests on this series as was violinist Marta Hidy.

== Scheduling ==
This half-hour series was broadcast Sundays at 5:00 p.m. (Eastern) from 19 April to 24 May 1970.
