= Let's Talk Music =

Canadian classical music television series

- Genre: Classical music
- Country of origin: Canada
- Original language: English
- No. of seasons: 5

Production
- Running time: 30 minutes

Original release
- Network: CBC Television
- Release: 6 May 1962 – 11 October 1967

Let's Talk Music is a Canadian classical music television program that aired on CBC Television from 1962 to 1967.

== Premise ==
Series hosts William Stevens, a pianist, and Norman Kihl, an announcer for the network, hosted this Montreal-produced series on classical music geared towards viewers who were unfamiliar with the genre. Stevens explained classical music concepts with performances of pieces by Stevens and guests which included Dorothy Weldon (harp), Robert Peters (tenor), Louis Charbonneau (tympani).

== Scheduling ==
The half-hour series was broadcast on the national network on Sundays at 12:30 p.m. from 6 May to 24 June 1962. It returned on a regional basis in Ontario and Quebec from 1965 to 1967, airing from July until September or October at various time slots in those years.
