= How About That? =

- Also known as: Weather and Why
- Genre: Children's educational programming
- Presented by: Percy Saltzman
- Country of origin: Canada
- Original language: English
- No. of seasons: 1

Production
- Producers: Joanne Hughes; Peggy Nairn
- Running time: 15 minutes

Original release
- Network: CBC Television
- Release: 20 October 1953 – 29 June 1954

How About That?, originally titled Weather and Why, is a Canadian children's science television program that aired on CBC Television from 1953 to 1954.

== Premise ==
This series, hosted by the network's weather presenter Percy Saltzman, featured demonstrations of physics concepts and provided instructions on creating instruments such as rain gauges or anemometers out of common items.

== Scheduling ==
This 15-minute series was broadcast on Tuesdays at 5:15 p.m. (Eastern) from 20 October 1953 until 29 June 1954. The first two weekly episodes were aired under the original title Weather and Why until it was retitled as of 4 November.
