= Time for Sunday School =

Canadian children's television series

- Genre: Children's television
- Presented by: Gloria Chetwynd; Ann Graham; Helene Nickerson
- Country of origin: Canada
- Original language: English
- No. of seasons: 4

Production
- Producers: Robert Haylock; Bill Rice
- Production location: Montreal
- Running time: 30 minutes

Original release
- Network: CBC Television
- Release: 7 October 1962 – 26 June 1966

Time for Sunday School is a Canadian children's religious television program that aired on CBC Television from 1962 to 1966.

== Premise ==
The program consisted of Bible stories and music with episodes of the American animated series Davey and Goliath. The program also featured Canadian-produced Crabapple Island segments whose leading characters were Mayor Basil Bullfrog and Myopia Mole.

By late 1964, the program featured elements of comparative religion, for example featuring the subject of Hallowe'en and the historic contributions of Druids to that festival.

Hosts included Gloria Chetwynd, Ann Graham and Helene Nickerson. Nickerson left the series after June 1963 to pursue a teaching career.

== Production ==
The program was produced at CBC Montreal by Robert Haylock, and later Bill Rice.

== Scheduling ==
This half-hour program aired on Sunday mornings or early afternoons for four seasons, except during mid-year breaks (July to October). Its debut was 7 October 1962 and its last broadcast was on 26 June 1966.
