= Summer Sounds '66 =

- Genre: Music
- Country of origin: Canada
- Original language: English
- No. of seasons: 1

Production
- Running time: 15 minutes

Original release
- Network: CBC Television
- Release: 2 July – 15 October 1966

Summer Sounds '66 is a Canadian music television program that aired on CBC Television in 1966.

== Premise ==
Episodes were produced in various Canadian cities and featured musicians from the respective regions. One Halifax-produced episode featured Édith Butler, Anne Murray, Ken Tobias with host Bill Langstroth. Tommy Banks performed with Judi Singh on another episode from Edmonton.

== Scheduling ==
This 15-minute program was broadcast on Saturdays at 6:30 p.m. (Eastern time) from 2 July to 15 October 1966.
