= Quebec in English =

- Country of origin: Canada
- Original language: English
- No. of seasons: 1
- No. of episodes: 3

Production
- Producer: Paul Wright
- Production location: Montreal
- Running time: 30 minutes

Original release
- Network: CBC Television
- Release: 13 June – 27 June 1965

Quebec in English is a Canadian television program that aired on CBC Television in 1965.

== Premise ==
This program was a compilation of selected news and entertainment items that were previously broadcast on Radio-Canada, as packaged for an English-speaking audience.

The debut episode included profiles of an artists' event in Montreal, and a feature on the Pilgrims of Saint Michael ("Les Berets Blancs"), a Roman Catholic group which espouses Social Credit philosophy. Other segments presented include excerpts from the youth television program Jeunesse Oblige and stories on a Quebec City riot control vehicle and on a woman who constructed a personal bomb shelter.

== Scheduling ==
This half-hour program was broadcast Sundays at 2:00 p.m. (Eastern time) from 13 to 27 June 1965.
