= One Northern Summer =

- Genre: Documentary
- Country of origin: Canada
- Original language: English
- No. of seasons: 1
- No. of episodes: 13

Production
- Producer: Denis Hargrave
- Camera setup: Curt Clausen
- Running time: 30 minutes

Original release
- Network: CBC Television
- Release: 29 December 1971 – 7 June 1972

One Northern Summer is a Canadian documentary television miniseries that aired on CBC Television from 1971 to 1977.

== Premise ==
This series featured both animal and human life in the Arctic. Seals around the Pribiloff Islands were the subject of one episode, and the Northern Games second year in Inuvik was featured in another.

== Scheduling ==
This half-hour series was broadcast Wednesdays at 4:30 p.m. (Eastern) from 29 December 1971 to 7 June 1972. It was rebroadcast at various dates and times in 1972, 1973, 1974 and 1977.
