= International Law (TV series) =

Canadian documentary television miniseries

- Genre: Documentary
- Country of origin: Canada
- Original language: English
- No. of seasons: 1
- No. of episodes: 6

Production
- Running time: 30 minutes

Original release
- Network: CBC Television
- Release: 27 August – 1 October 1961

International Law is a Canadian documentary television miniseries on international law that aired on CBC Television in 1961.

== Premise ==
This series concerned the various aspects of international law with such examples as the International Court of Justice, the Nuremberg Trials, and external interventions in domestic conflicts. Episodes featured a panel of academic and judicial experts to discuss the issues raised.

== Scheduling ==
This half-hour series was broadcast on Sundays at 5:30 p.m. (Eastern) from 27 August to 1 October 1961.

== Episodes ==
1. 27 August 1961: territorial waters
2. 3 September 1961: intervention
3. 10 September 1961: individual rights and responsibilities
4. 17 September 1961: International Court of Justice
5. 24 September 1961: Nuremberg trials (part 1)
6. 1 October 1961: Nuremberg trials (part 2)
