= The Challenge of the Lonely Sky =

- Genre: Documentary
- Written by: Frank Williams
- Narrated by: Frank Williams
- Country of origin: Canada
- Original language: English
- No. of seasons: 1
- No. of episodes: 4

Production
- Producer: Frank Williams
- Running time: 30 minutes

Original release
- Network: CBC Television
- Release: 2 July – 23 July 1974

The Challenge of the Lonely Sky is a Canadian documentary television miniseries that aired on CBC Television in 1974.

== Premise ==
The series concerns Canadian civil aviation.

== Scheduling ==
This half-hour series was broadcast Tuesdays at 7:30 p.m. from 2 to 23 July 1974.
