= Come Listen Awhile =

Canadian music television series

- Genre: Music
- Presented by: Doug Campbell
- Country of origin: Canada
- Original language: English
- No. of seasons: 1

Production
- Producer: Alex Pratt
- Production location: Vancouver
- Running time: 30 minutes

Original release
- Network: CBC Television
- Release: 1 October 1963 – 23 June 1964

Come Listen Awhile is a Canadian music television series that aired on CBC Television from 1963 to 1964.

== Premise ==
Doug Campbell hosted this Vancouver-produced folk music series with regulars Bud Spencer (lead vocalist), Pat Trudell (piano) and an orchestra led by George Colangis who welcomed various visiting artists.

== Scheduling ==
This half-hour series was broadcast Tuesdays at 5:30 p.m. (Eastern) from 1 October 1963 to 23 June 1964.
