= Pifffle & Co. =

- Genre: Comedy
- Written by: Pat Donahue; Tony Hudz; Ian Belcher; Clive Cocking; Harry Fontaine; Eric Nicol; Jim Scott
- Directed by: Al Vitols
- Presented by: Terry David Mulligan; Bill Reiter
- Country of origin: Canada
- Original language: English
- No. of seasons: 1

Production
- Producer: Al Vitols
- Production location: Vancouver
- Running time: 30 minutes

Original release
- Network: CBC Television
- Release: 11 July – 26 September 1971

Pifffle & Co. is a Canadian comedy television series which aired on CBC Television in 1971.

== Premise ==
Terry David Mulligan and Bill Reiter hosted this Vancouver-produced series, whose title was intentionally spelled with three F's. The sketches were performed by series regulars Allan Anderson, Graeme Campbell, Roxanne Erwin, Joseph Golland, Micki Maunsell, Shirley Milliner and Carol Oczkowska.

Each episode was dedicated to a satirical examination of particular topic, based on titles such as "Pifffle & Co. vs. Canadians", "Pifffle & Co. vs. Health", "Pifffle & Co. vs. Love" and "Pifffle & Co. vs. Women's Lib".

== Scheduling ==
This half-hour series was broadcast on Sundays at 5:30 p.m. (Eastern) from 11 July to 26 September 1971.

== See also ==
* A Second Look (1969, also produced and directed by Al Vitols)
