= Midweek (Canadian TV program) =

- Genre: Public affairs
- Country of origin: Canada
- Original language: English
- No. of seasons: 1

Production
- Executive producer: Richard Nielsen
- Producer: Alan Erich
- Running time: 60 minutes

Original release
- Network: CBC Television
- Release: 30 September 1971 – 18 May 1972

Midweek is a Canadian public affairs television program that aired on CBC Television from 1971 to 1972.

== Premise ==
This series was a companion episode of CBC's popular Sunday night Weekend public affairs series. It replaced the previous Saturday supplementary broadcast of Weekend. Hosts for each episode of Midweek were a selection of Clive Baxter, Michael Callaghan, Peter Desbarats, Pierre Nadeau and Kay Sigurjonsson. Journalists such as Doug Collins, Michael Maltby and Larry Zolf were featured in reports for this series.

== Scheduling ==
This hour-long series was broadcast Thursdays at 10:00 p.m. (Eastern) from 30 September 1971 to 18 May 1972.
