= Outdoors with Hal Denton =

Canadian television program

- Genre: Nature
- Presented by: Hal Denton
- Country of origin: Canada
- Original language: English
- No. of seasons: 1
- No. of episodes: 4

Original release
- Network: CBC Television
- Release: 20 June – 11 July 1955

Outdoors with Hal Denton is a Canadian nature television program that aired on CBC Television in 1955.

== Premise ==
This wildlife program was hosted by Northwest Sportsman editor Hal Denton.

== Scheduling ==
This half-hour program was broadcast on Mondays at 9:30 p.m. (Eastern) from 20 June to 11 July 1955.

No.	Original release date
1	20 June 1955
Threadline spinning for fishing with guests F. "Buss" McCaig and A. Folinsbee
2	27 June 1955
How to build duck decoys and to prepare packhorses with T. B. Lean, an expert on big-game hunting
3	4 July 1955
Denton and fellow hunter A. M. "Skate" Hames are featured in a film of a cougar hunt in Sechelt Peninsula, British Columbia. Guest John Herman, a taxidermist, demonstrates how a cougar's head is mounted.
4	11 July 1955
Gregory Clark narrates the film presentation "Fish I Have Known"
