= Sunday Pops Series =

- Genre: Classical music
- Country of origin: Canada
- Original language: English
- No. of seasons: 1
- No. of episodes: 7

Production
- Running time: 60 minutes

Original release
- Network: CBC Television; CBC Stereo (radio simulcast)
- Release: 24 July – 4 September 1977

Sunday Pops Series is a Canadian classical music television program that aired on CBC Television and was simulcast on CBC Stereo in 1977.

== Premise ==
Symphony concerts were produced in various Canadian cities: Edmonton, Montreal, Ottawa, Quebec City, Toronto, Vancouver and Winnipeg.

== Scheduling ==
This hour-long program was broadcast on Sundays at 10:00 p.m. from 24 July to 4 September 1977.
