= Over the Line Fence =

- Genre: Agricultural documentary
- Country of origin: Canada
- Original language: English
- No. of seasons: 1

Production
- Producer: Murray Creed
- Running time: 30 minutes

Original release
- Network: CBC Television
- Release: 30 June – 22 September 1956

Over the Line Fence is a Canadian agricultural documentary television program that aired on CBC Television in 1956.

== Premise ==
This program featured aspects of agricultural and rural life. Episodes included relevant documentary films. It was produced by Murray Creed of CBC's Farm Department. He later produced Country Calendar (now Country Canada) and Marketplace.

== Scheduling ==
This half-hour program was broadcast Saturdays at 5:00 p.m. from 30 June to 22 September 1956.

The debut episode on 30 June 1956 featured the 1953 NFB documentary film "The World at Your Feet" about soil and plant growth.

Other episodes concerned fishing, Scottish sheep ranching and Western Canadian wheat production (7 July).
