= Are You Putting Me On? =

- Country of origin: Canada
- Original language: English
- No. of seasons: 1

Production
- Producer: Bob Gibbons

Original release
- Network: CBC Television
- Release: 14 June – 26 July 1975

Are You Putting Me On? is a Canadian reality television series which aired on CBC Television from 1975 to 1977.

== Premise ==
This series featured highlights from earlier episodes of the series All About Toronto and Such Is Life, dwelling on features filmed with a hidden camera.

== Scheduling ==
The half-hour series aired Saturdays at 7:00 p.m. (Eastern) from 14 June to 26 July 1975. It was rebroadcast Thursday evenings from 31 March to 19 May 1977.
