= CBC Summer Symphonies =

1978 Canadian television miniseries

- Genre: Music
- Country of origin: Canada
- Original language: English
- No. of seasons: 1
- No. of episodes: 6

Production
- Running time: 60 minutes

Original release
- Network: CBC Television; CBC Stereo
- Release: 16 July – 27 August 1978

CBC Summer Symphonies is a Canadian music television miniseries which aired on CBC Television and CBC Stereo in 1978.

== Premise ==
This series featured symphony orchestra concerts from Halifax, Hamilton, Montreal, Quebec, Toronto and Winnipeg. Artists featured included the Canadian Brass, Colette Boky (vocalist), Philippe Djokic (violin), Monica Gaylord (piano), Jon Peterson (oboe), Marie-Claire Seguin (vocalist) and Richard Turner (harp). CBC Stereo provided a national FM radio simulcast of the concerts. The debut episode featured the Hamilton Philharmonic Orchestra with conductor Boris Brott and the Canadian Brass.

== Scheduling ==
This hour-long series was broadcast on Sundays at 10:00 p.m. (Eastern) from 16 July to 27 August 1978.
