= The Great Canadian Culture Hunt =

- Genre: Documentary
- Presented by: Gordon Pinsent
- Country of origin: Canada
- Original language: English
- No. of seasons: 1
- No. of episodes: 6

Production
- Producer: George Robertson
- Running time: 60 minutes

Original release
- Network: CBC Television
- Release: 10 March – 14 April 1976

The Great Canadian Culture Hunt is a Canadian documentary television miniseries that aired on CBC Television in 1976.

== Premise ==
Canadian culture was featured in this series of documentaries hosted by actor Gordon Pinsent.

== Scheduling ==
This hour-long series was broadcast Wednesdays from 10 March to 14 April 1976. The first three episodes were broadcast at 8:30 p.m. after which the episodes began at 8:00 p.m.

== Episodes ==
1. 10 March 1976, "Politics and Culture" (Dave Robertson producer) – featured opinions from Greg Curnoe, Yvon Deschamps, Hugh Faulkner (then Secretary of State), Herschel Hardin, Peter C. Newman (Maclean's), Lise Payette, Hamilton Southam (then the National Arts Centre director) and Peter Swann (Royal Ontario Museum director).
2. 17 March 1976, "Home Movies" (Bob Ennis producer) – concerned the national film industry and the often inconsistent support from both the private and public sectors
3. 24 March 1976, "The Music Industry" (Robert Patchell producer) – Bruce Cockburn, Murray McLauchlan and Anne Murray were interviewed
4. 31 March 1976, "The Publishing Industry" (Jesse Nishihata producer) – featured Margaret Atwood, Robert Kroetsch, Irving Layton, Michael Ondaatje and Audrey Thomas
5. 7 April 1976, "Theatre" (Allan King producer) – featured writers Carol Bolt, David Freeman, David French, Michel Garneau, Michel Tremblay, and directors Bill Glassco, Martin Kinch and Paul Thompson.
6. 14 April 1976, "The Television Industry" (Larry Gosnell producer) -

The final program dealt with television, and centred on the research and opinions of U.S. scholar George Gerbner, dean on the Annenberg School of Communications.
