= Moods of Man =

- Genre: Music
- Presented by: Jim Johnson; Harry Aoki
- Country of origin: Canada
- Original language: English
- No. of seasons: 1
- No. of episodes: 8

Original release
- Network: CBC Television
- Release: 3 March – 30 June 1968

Moods of Man is a Canadian music television program that aired on CBC Television in 1968.

== Premise ==
This Vancouver-produced variety series featured musicians Jim Johnson and Harry Aoki. Johnson was an American expatriate guitarist and singer who became an English and choir teacher in Prince George, British Columbia, Lake Cowichan, British Columbia, and Duncan, British Columbia. Aoki was another musician who played bass and harmonica. The duo were previously featured on CBC Radio's Parade of Choirs and hosted their own radio show, Wandering. Each episode was based on a given theme, such as the debut's exploration of trouble and hope. Musical styles varied from blues to folk to classical.

The hosts were regularly joined by musicians Bud Henderson (piano), Al Johnson (drums), Stan Johnson (bass) and Ray Moga (guitar). Ann Mortifee was a guest on this series.

== Scheduling ==
This half-hour series was broadcast on Sundays at 2:00 p.m. (Eastern) from 3 March to 30 June 1968.
