= Canada File =

1961 Canadian documentary TV series

- Genre: Documentary
- Country of origin: Canada
- Original language: English
- No. of seasons: 1

Production
- Running time: 30 minutes

Original release
- Network: CBC Television
- Release: 16 July – 24 September 1961

Canada File is a Canadian documentary television series that aired on CBC Television in 1961.

== Premise ==
This series provided a national rebroadcast of locally produced documentaries and current affairs programming. Contributing local series included Live and Learn (Ottawa), Consensus (Vancouver) and Eye to Eye (Winnipeg). Topics included a discussion by two Carleton University professors on criticism, developmentally-challenged children, writers from French Canada, substance abuse in Vancouver, the situation of black people in Winnipeg, the closure of a Manitoba newspaper and Montreal's St. James Street.

== Scheduling ==
This half-hour series was broadcast Sundays at 1:00 p.m. from 16 July to 24 September 1961.
