= The Tapp Room =

Canadian television program

- Genre: Variety/Interview
- Presented by: Jimmy Tapp
- Country of origin: Canada
- Original language: English
- No. of seasons: 2

Production
- Production location: Montreal
- Running time: 30 minutes

Original release
- Network: CBC Television
- Release: 14 May 1956 – 20 September 1958

The Tapp Room is a Canadian variety show that aired on CBC Television from 1956 to 1958.

== Premise ==
This Montreal-produced program was named for host Jimmy Tapp who hosted popular music artists who were visiting the city. Episodes also included segments such as songs and an early 1957 "Name the Chimp" competition.

== Scheduling ==
This half-hour program was broadcast on Mondays at 11:30 p.m. from 14 May 1956 to 20 September 1958.
