= Holiday Canada =

- Genre: Travel
- Country of origin: Canada
- Original language: English
- No. of seasons: 1
- No. of episodes: 13

Production
- Running time: 30 minutes
- Production company: National Film Board of Canada

Original release
- Network: CBC Television
- Release: 4 July – 3 October 1968

Holiday Canada is a Canadian travel television program that aired on CBC Television in 1968.

== Premise ==
Each episode of Holiday Canada consisted of two National Film Board of Canada films about travelling within Canada.

== Scheduling ==
This half-hour series was broadcast on Thursdays at 5:30 p.m. from 4 July to 3 October 1968.
