= Children's Cinema =

- Genre: Children's film
- Presented by: Robert Homme
- Country of origin: Canada
- Original language: English
- No. of seasons: 6

Production
- Running time: 30–60 minutes

Original release
- Network: CBC Television
- Release: 22 December 1969 – 28 June 1975

Children's Cinema is a Canadian children's film presentation series that aired on CBC Television from 1969 to 1975.

== Premise ==
Bob Homme (The Friendly Giant) hosted this series of films for children from Canada and other nations.

== Scheduling ==
The initial series was run weekdays at 10:00 a.m. (North American Eastern time) for half-hour time slots during the Christmas holidays from 22 December 1969 to 2 January 1970. Regular season runs began October 1970 and were broadcast Saturdays at 1:00 p.m. (Eastern time) as follows:

Duration	Season run	
60 minutes	3 October 1970	17 April 1971
60 minutes	2 October 1971	8 April 1972
30 minutes	15 April 1972	30 June 1973
60 minutes	15 September 1973	6 April 1974
30 minutes	6 April 1974	6 July 1974
60 minutes	5 October 1974	28 June 1975
