= Mister X in Canada =

- Genre: Historical
- Presented by: Carter B. Store
- Country of origin: Canada
- Original language: English
- No. of seasons: 1
- No. of episodes: 13

Production
- Producer: Marion Dunn

Original release
- Network: CBC Television
- Release: 4 April – 13 June 1960

Mister X in Canada is a Canadian historical television program that aired on CBC Television in 1960.

== Premise ==
Host Carter B. Store, who worked at the Ottawa School Board as an inspector, created drawings to accompany his discussion of historic Canadian people.

== Scheduling ==
This 15-minute series was broadcast on Mondays at 4:45 p.m. from 4 April to 13 June 1960.
