= Art in Action (TV program) =

- Genre: Arts
- Presented by: George Swinton
- Country of origin: Canada
- Original language: English
- No. of seasons: 2

Production
- Production location: Winnipeg
- Running time: 30 minutes

Original release
- Network: CBC Television
- Release: 7 October 1959 – 1 October 1961

Art in Action is a Canadian arts television program that aired on CBC Television from 1959 to 1961.

== Premise ==
University of Manitoba School of Art professor George Swinton hosted this program from Winnipeg. The first season described the history, techniques and materials involved in sculpting and painting. The second season focused on the history and techniques of landscape painting

== Scheduling ==
The half-hour program aired in the first season on Wednesdays at 5:00 p.m. (Eastern) from 7 October 1959 to 11 May 1960. A second season aired on Sundays 10:30 p.m. from 2 July to 1 October 1961.
