= Final Audition =

- Genre: Music competition
- Presented by: Fred Davis
- Country of origin: Canada
- Original language: English
- No. of seasons: 1
- No. of episodes: 4

Production
- Producer: Ray McConnell
- Running time: 60 minutes

Original release
- Network: CBC Television
- Release: 31 March – 19 May 1979

Final Audition is a Canadian musical competition television miniseries that aired on CBC Television in 1979.

== Premise ==
These broadcasts featured the top 15 entrants of cigarette brand du Maurier's Search For Talent competition. The first three episodes each featured performances from five of the entrants. The five finalists from those broadcasts were featured on a live fourth episode from Toronto's Queen Elizabeth Theatre. The finalists were promised further exposure on the CBC.

== Scheduling ==
This hour-long series was broadcast on Fridays at 9:00 p.m. (Eastern) from 31 March to 19 May 1978.

== See also ==
- Canadian Idol
