= Sunday Best (Canadian TV series) =

Canadian documentary television series

- Genre: Documentary
- Written by: John Corcelli
- Country of origin: Canada
- Original language: English
- No. of seasons: 6

Production
- Executive producer: William Harcourt
- Running time: 60 minutes

Original release
- Network: CBC Television
- Release: 11 July 1971 – 29 August 1976

Sunday Best is a Canadian documentary television series that aired on CBC Television from 1971 to 1976.

== Premise ==
This mid-season series featured rebroadcasts of CBC documentaries on various subjects, including episodes from Tuesday Night.

== Scheduling ==
This hour-long series was broadcast on Sundays at 4:00 p.m. as follows (times in Eastern):

1. 11 July 1971 – 12 September 1971
2. 2 July 1972 – 10 September 1972
3. 7 Jul 1974 – 8 Sep 1974
4. 6 Jul 1975 – 7 Sep 1975
5. 1 Aug 1976 – 29 Aug 1976
