= Jazz with Jackson =

Canadian music television series

- Genre: music
- Presented by: Dick MacDougall
- Country of origin: Canada
- Original language: English
- No. of seasons: 2

Production
- Producer: Norman Jewison
- Running time: 30 minutes

Original release
- Network: CBC Television
- Release: 10 January 1953 – 24 September 1955

Jazz with Jackson is a Canadian music television program that aired on CBC Television from 1953 to 1955.

== Premise ==
Series regulars on this jazz performance programme included Cal Jackson and a big band, hosted by Dick MacDougall.

== Scheduling ==
This half-hour series was broadcast for three seasons as follows:

| Day | Time | Season run |
|---|---|---|
| Saturdays | 8:00 p.m. | 10 January to 3 October 1953 |
| Wednesdays | 7:30 p.m. | 7 October 1953 to 14 April 1954 |
| Saturdays | 9:00 p.m. | 2 July to 24 September 1955 |

Note: The first season initially aired on alternate weeks until a weekly schedule began in mid-June 1953, with The March Of Time seen on other Saturdays.
