= Medical Explorers =

- Genre: Biography
- Presented by: William Gibson
- Country of origin: Canada
- Original language: English
- No. of seasons: 1
- No. of episodes: 13

Production
- Producer: Keith Christie
- Running time: 30 minutes

Original release
- Network: CBC Television
- Release: 7 January – 17 June 1973

Medical Explorers is a Canadian biographical television series that aired on CBC Television in 1973.

== Premise ==
This Vancouver-produced series featured biographical sketches of contributors to the field of medicine. Episodes featured such personalities as Leonardo da Vinci, William Harvey (circulatory system), Joseph Lister and Edward Jenner (smallpox vaccine developers), Florence Nightingale, William Osler, Charles Sheffington (neurology), Frank Wesbrook (ambulance inventor) and Christopher Wren. The series was presented by William Gibson of University of British Columbia and curator of Woodward Medical Library.

== Scheduling ==
This half-hour series was broadcast on Sundays at 4:30 p.m. (Eastern) from 7 January to 17 June 1973.
