= Story Seat =

Canadian children's television series

- Genre: Children's television
- Presented by: Lillian Carlson; Norman Young
- Country of origin: Canada
- Original language: English
- No. of seasons: 1

Production
- Producer: Philip Keatley
- Production location: Vancouver
- Running time: 15 minutes

Original release
- Network: CBC Television
- Release: 11 January – 28 June 1962

Story Seat is a Canadian children's television series that aired on CBC Television in 1962, in which hosts Lillian Carlson and Norman Young recited and performed stories for young children. The 15-minute shows were broadcast Thursdays at 4:15 p.m. (Eastern time) from 11 January to 28 June 1962.
