= About Canada =

Canadian television series

- Country of origin: Canada
- Original language: English
- No. of seasons: 1

Production
- Running time: 30 minutes

Original release
- Network: CBC Television
- Release: 14 February 1956 – 30 June 1957

About Canada is a Canadian television series featuring National Film Board films that aired on CBC Television from 1956 to 1957.

== Premise ==
In its 1956 season, it aired Tuesdays at 6 p.m. from 14 February to 17 July 1956. That year's presentations included "Arctic Dog Team", "Blacksmith", "Caleche Driver", "Dick Hickey", "Longhouse People", "Men of Lunenberg and Windswept Isles", "Motorman", "The Newcomers", "Paul Tomkowicz – Street Railway Switchman", "People of the Skeena", "Peter and the Potter", "Salt from the Earth", "Shadow on the Prairies", "Story of Oil", "Taxi Driver", "Ti-Jean Goes Lumbering" and "Voices from Acadia".

The following year, About Canada aired Sundays at 1 p.m. from 12 May to 30 June. Films in that season included subjects such as the previous year's Royal visit, the forest industry, First Nations people, the Magdalen Islands and Newfoundland residents.
