= Live and Learn (TV program) =

- Genre: Educational
- Country of origin: Canada
- Original language: English
- No. of seasons: 6

Original release
- Network: CBC Television
- Release: 15 October 1959 – 12 May 1965

Live and Learn, originally titled Course of Knowledge, is a Canadian educational television program that aired on CBC Television from 1959 to 1965.

== Premise ==
This program presented courses on the sciences and humanities. It was co-produced by the CBC and the University of Toronto, initially airing as a local show on CBLT Toronto and eventually seen throughout the CBC network. Initial course shows were produced in Toronto and later produced in other Canadian cities. At least one course broadcast in this program was imported from a United States educational production.

== Scheduling ==
This half-hour program was broadcast on Wednesdays at 6:00 p.m. (Eastern) from 15 October 1959 to 12 May 1965, with repeat broadcasts on Sundays at 12:30 p.m. Initially, this was a local CBLT Toronto broadcast, but was eventually carried by other CBC network stations.

== Courses featured ==
- "Conditions for Life", with David Baird (broadcast November 1963, produced in Ottawa by Betty Zimmerman)
- "Focus on Physics" (12-week serial, broadcast nationally late 1958) hosted by Patterson Hume and Donald Ivey of the University of Toronto who incorporated diagrams and demonstrations in their presentations
- "Lyrics and Legends" (broadcast February 1965), featuring folk music, a 1963 American production by Philadelphia's WHYY-TV
- "The Old New World", archaeology (broadcast Spring 1964), produced in Winnipeg
- "Perception and Learning", with Robert Wake and Russell Wendt (broadcast June 1961, produced in Ottawa by Betty Zimmerman)
- "The Plant Kingdom" (broadcast 1965), produced in Winnipeg
- psychology, with Carleton Williams
- Russian language instruction (26-week serial, broadcast 1960), was eligible for Toronto university credit
- "Light, Liberty, and Learning," a 13 part series looking at campus life at Queen's University at Kingston in August 1964.

== Awards and recognition ==
A Live and Learn course in French culture and history won an award from Ohio State University in 1960.

== Reception ==
The "Focus on Physics" course drew popular response as only 17 of the approximately 1500 letters from viewers were critical of the production.

== See also ==
- University of the Air
