= The Game of Scouting =

Canadian television program

- Genre: Outdoors demonstration
- Presented by: Garnet Anthony; Mike McNamara
- Country of origin: Canada
- Original language: English
- No. of seasons: 1

Production
- Production location: Edmonton
- Running time: 30 minutes

Original release
- Network: CBC Television
- Release: 6 July – 28 September 1967

The Game of Scouting is a Canadian educational television program that aired on CBC Television in 1967.

== Premise ==
The series was produced to commemorate the 60th anniversary of the Boy Scouts movement. Each episode featured a scout troop who would demonstrate various outdoors skills such as constructing a rope bridge across a ravine, filling a backpack for overnight hike or using topographical maps.

== Scheduling ==
This half-hour series was broadcast on Thursdays at 5:30 p.m. (Eastern) from 6 July to 28 September 1967.
