= Healthier, Wealthier, Wiser? =

- Genre: Public affairs
- Written by: Warner Troyer
- Presented by: Paul Fox
- Country of origin: Canada
- Original language: English
- No. of seasons: 1
- No. of episodes: 4

Production
- Producer: Denny Spence
- Running time: 30 minutes

Original release
- Network: CBC Television
- Release: 3 May – 24 May 1965

Healthier, Wealthier, Wiser? is a Canadian public affairs television miniseries on health care that aired on CBC Television in 1965.

== Premise ==
Emmett Matthew Hall's 1964 royal commission on health recommended that there be a national public health care system. This four-part series discussed the current state of medical coverage in Canada, including comparisons to the situation in other nations. The television series was accompanied by a five-part radio series and broadcast during a series of nationwide public meetings on health care.

== Production ==
Healthier, Wealthier, Wiser? was a co-production of the Canadian Association for Adult Education, the Canadian Institute on Public Affairs and the CBC. Denny Spence produced the series with assistance from Christina McDougall and researcher Joan Hollobon.

== Scheduling ==
This half-hour series was broadcast on Mondays at 10:00 p.m. (Eastern) from 3 to 24 May 1965. Episode titles were:

1. 3 May 1965: "The Family"
2. 10 May 1965: "The Doctor"
3. 17 May 1965: "The Society"
4. 24 May 1965: "The Future"
