= Sight and Cast =

Canadian television program

- Genre: outdoors
- Presented by: Tiny Bennett
- Country of origin: Canada
- Original language: English
- No. of seasons: 1

Production
- Producer: Don Carroll
- Running time: 30 minutes

Original release
- Network: CBC Television
- Release: 26 September 1965 – 2 January 1966

Sight and Cast is a Canadian outdoors television program that aired on CBC Television from 1965 to 1966.

== Premise ==
Tiny Bennett, an author of fishing and hunting subjects, hosted this program.

== Scheduling ==
This half-hour program was broadcast on Sundays at 4:00 p.m. (Eastern time) from 26 September 1965 to 2 January 1966.
