= In the Common Interest =

Canadian documentary television series

- Genre: Documentary
- Presented by: Vincent Tovell
- Country of origin: Canada
- Original language: English
- No. of seasons: 1

Production
- Running time: 15 minutes

Original release
- Network: CBC Television
- Release: 6 February 1955 – 27 June 1956

In the Common Interest is a Canadian documentary television series that aired on CBC Television from 1955 to 1956.

== Premise ==
Hosted by United Nations correspondent Vincent Tovell, this CBC series examined social development across various nations, featuring countries such as Ethiopia, Indonesia and Thailand in its first season. The second season included global development topics such as improvement in living standards, efforts to reduce malaria, and the work of the United Nations including UNICEF's activities to support women and their children in Asia. CBC produced In the Common Interest with support from the United Nations.

== Scheduling ==
This 15-minute series was broadcast on various days and times from 6 February 1955 to 1 July 1956.
