= Twelve for Summer =

Canadian variety television program

- Genre: Variety
- Country of origin: Canada
- Original language: English
- No. of seasons: 2

Production
- Producers: Dave Thomas (1967); Neil Sutherland (1968)

Original release
- Network: CBC Television
- Release: 25 June 1966 – 27 August 1967

Twelve for Summer is a Canadian variety television program that aired on CBC Television from 1966 to 1967. Half-hour episodes originated from various Canadian cities.

== Scheduling ==
=== Season 1 – 1966 ===
The first season aired Saturdays 7 p.m. from 25 June to 3 September 1966.

Date	Episode
25 June 1966	Debut episode features Malka and Joso with the Beers Family performing traditional American folk songs.
2 July 1966	Singer Ken Coleman is joined by a Gillian Russell, Patty Surbey and a band led by trumpet player Bobby Hales.
9 July 1966	
16 July 1966	"The Doug Crosley Show" with guests Vanda King, The Willis and Pat Riccio's 20-man band. Bob Jarvis produced this episode.
23 July 1966	Andy Anderson, Reg Gibson, Ted Komar, Terri Lane, The New Tavern Singers and The Rodgers Brothers perform various folk and blues songs.
30 July 1966	Pierre Lalonde hosts this "Sounds '67" episode.
6 August 1966	"A Summer Place" depicts a summertime rural setting with performers Tommon Common, Patti van Evera and Robina Beard.
13 August 1966	
20 August 1966	
27 August 1966	Guido Basso hosts this episode with Roy Castle and Betty Robertson.
3 September 1966	"The Gordie Tapp Show" featuring Allan Blye, The Paul Brothers, Joyce Sullivan and comic trio Shirley.

=== Season 2 – 1967 ===
The second season aired on Sundays 7 p.m. from 18 June to 3 September 1967.

Date	Episode
18 June 1967	Patty Surbey, Pat Rose and the Brian Griffiths orchestra are featured in this episode recorded in Vancouver.
25 June 1967	"Joyous Noise" with The Young Corporation
2 July 1967	Lance Harrison and his Dixieland band perform the songs of New Orleans and Chicago in this episode recorded in Vancouver
9 July 1967	This episode from Winnipeg features Eric Wild and chorus.
16 July 1967	This episode from Ottawa features singers Orville Johnston, Dorothy Krikorian and Priscilla Wright.
23 July 1967	Bobby Arvon, Karen Oxley and Anne Murray are featured in this episode from Halifax.
30 July 1967	"The Best of Broadway" with Mark Cohen, Natalka, Dianne Nelson, Al Osten and Buddy Victor as recorded in Edmonton.
6 August 1967	
13 August 1967	Tommy Ambrose, Anita Ortiz, Cedric Phillips, Arleigh Peterson Dancers and Nat Raider Orchestra perform songs from the 1920s and 1930s. This episode originated from the Expo '67 International Broadcasting Centre in Montreal.
20 August 1967	
27 August 1967	From Vancouver, Miles Ramsay sings with trombonist Dave Robbins' 16-man ensemble and folk-rock band The Collectors.
