= Let's Speak English =

- Genre: Language instruction
- Country of origin: Canada
- Original language: English
- No. of episodes: 78

Production
- Producers: Peggy Nairn; Rena Elmer
- Running time: 30 minutes

Original release
- Network: CBC Television
- Release: 7 October 1961 – 11 April 1962

Let's Speak English is a Canadian language instruction television program that aired on CBC Television from 1961 to 1962.

== Premise ==
This series taught English as a foreign or second language. It was hosted by Betty Fullerton, John Wevers, and as of the seventh episode, Barry Callaghan. Fullerton was a Scarborough, Ontario secondary school teacher while the other hosts were based at the University of Toronto. Michael Kay and Donald Theall from the same university served as series consultants.

== Production ==
Let's Speak English was a co-production of the CBC, the Metropolitan Education Television Association, Canadian Scene (multicultural news agency), Ontario's provincial citizenship division, and the federal Department of Citizenship and Immigration. Peggy Nairn Liptrott produced the first four episodes, then Rena Elmer served as producer for the remainder of the series.

English language concepts were communicated with sketches and mimicry, demonstrating language use in ordinary situations.

== Scheduling ==
This half-hour series was broadcast on three days per week, on Saturdays and Sundays at 12:00 p.m. and on Wednesdays at 11:30 a.m. between 7 October 1961 to 11 April 1962. The Wednesday episodes provided a review of material from the weekend episodes.
