= Sit Back with Jack =

- Genre: Variety show
- Presented by: Jack Shapira; Marsh Phimister
- Composer: Frank Lewis
- Country of origin: Canada
- Original language: English
- No. of seasons: 1

Production
- Producer: Frank Rosler
- Production location: Winnipeg
- Running time: 30 minutes

Original release
- Network: CBC Television
- Release: 17 April – 26 June 1960

Related
- The Show That Jack Built

Sit Back with Jack is a Canadian music variety show that aired on CBC Television in 1960.

== Premise ==
This Winnipeg-produced program featured Jack Shapira and his band. Each episode featured a "Shapira Sound Track" segment of location footage filmed in Winnipeg on subjects such as the Canadian Pacific Railway freight yards or scenes of Friday evening shopping. Guests during the program's run not only included professional musicians such as Bud & Travis, Frank D'Rone and Ray Eberle, but amateur performers such as Father Clayton Barclay (a harpsichord player), Wally Keep (a singing taxi driver), Vince Lovallo (a singing blacksmith) and Bobby Swartz (ventriloquist, operating his dummy Elmer).

== Scheduling ==
This half-hour program was broadcast Sundays at 1:00 p.m. from 17 April to 26 June 1960.
