= Some Honourable Members =

Canadian political talk show

- Genre: Political talk show
- Presented by: Patrick Watson
- Country of origin: Canada
- Original language: English
- No. of seasons: 2

Production
- Producer: Cameron Graham
- Production location: Ottawa
- Running time: 30 minutes

Original release
- Network: CBC Television
- Release: 23 October 1973 – 3 April 1975

Some Honourable Members is a Canadian political talk show that aired on CBC Television from 1973 to 1975.

== Premise ==
Each episode featured several Members of Parliament in a panel discussion on current political topics. Some episodes featured an interview with a single politician instead. The panel was not informed of the episode topics in advance, in order to promote spontaneous dialogue.

== Scheduling ==
This half-hour program was broadcast for two seasons, first on Tuesdays at 10:30 p.m. (Eastern time) from 23 October 1973 to 7 May 1974, then on Thursdays at 10:30 p.m. from 26 September 1974 to 3 April 1975.
