= Check-Up =

Canadian television series

- Written by: Alan King
- Presented by: Lloyd Robertson
- Country of origin: Canada
- Original language: English
- No. of seasons: 1
- No. of episodes: 12

Production
- Executive producer: John Livingston
- Producer: Denny Spence

Original release
- Network: CBC Television
- Release: 8 July – 23 September 1963

Check-Up is a Canadian medical television program that aired on CBC Television in 1963.

== Premise ==
The series was produced by the CBC in collaboration with the Canadian Medical Association. Each episode focused on a particular medical condition and featured doctors conducting a diagnosis and treatment of a patient. This was followed by interviews conducted by the host Lloyd Robertson and a guest panel of the physician, who discussed how the treatment plan was developed. The program concluded with a follow-up to the patient.

== Production ==
Norrie Swanson of the Canadian Arthritis and Rheumatism Association served as a consultant for Check-Up. Denny Spence produced the series with Eric Koch as supervising producer.

== Scheduling ==
The half-hour series aired Mondays at 7:30 p.m. (Eastern) from 8 July to 23 September 1963.
