= It's a Musical World =

Canadian television series

- Genre: Music
- Starring: Tommy Common; Tommy Makem
- Country of origin: Canada
- Original language: English
- No. of seasons: 2

Production
- Producer: Ken Gibson
- Production location: Vancouver
- Running time: 30 minutes

Original release
- Network: CBC Television
- Release: 21 June 1973 – 1 April 1975

It's a Musical World is a Canadian music television program that aired on CBC Television from 1973 to 1975.

Tommy Common and Tommy Makem took turns as series host with vocal group Sweet Majic as regulars. Episodes featured stories and folk music.

This half-hour series was broadcast for three seasons as follows:

Day	Time	Season run
Thursdays	8:00 p.m.	21 June to 6 September 1973
Wednesdays	8:30 p.m.	13 February to 27 March 1974
Tuesdays	7:30 p.m.	7 January to 1 April 1975
