= The World on Stage =

Canadian variety television series

- Genre: Variety show
- Presented by: Lizette Gervais
- Country of origin: Canada
- Original languages: English; French
- No. of seasons: 1
- No. of episodes: 12

Production
- Executive producer: Franz Kraemer
- Producers: Neil Andrews (English); Noel Gauvin (French); Pierre Morin (French)
- Production location: Montreal
- Running time: 30 minutes

Original release
- Network: CBC Television; Radio-Canada
- Release: 21 June – 6 September 1967

The World on Stage is a Canadian variety show that aired on CBC Television in 1967.

== Premise ==
This program was produced in Montreal during Expo '67 to feature performances from the various entertainers who visited Montreal. This was produced as separate English and French versions by the respective CBC television networks. Episodes were recorded in colour at Expo's International Broadcasting Centre and included performances of music, theatre and dance.

== Scheduling ==
This half-hour program was broadcast on Wednesdays at 10:30 p.m. (Eastern) from 21 June to 6 September 1967.
