= The Town Above =

- Also known as: En haut de la pente douce
- Written by: Roger Lemelin
- Country of origin: Canada
- Original languages: French; English
- No. of seasons: 1
- No. of episodes: 35

Production
- Producer: Jean Dumas
- Running time: 30 minutes

Original release
- Network: Télévision de Radio-Canada; CBC Television
- Release: 1959 – 1961

The Town Above (French: En haut de la pente douce) is a Canadian drama television series which was produced in French and English. It was broadcast on Radio-Canada and CBC Television from 1959 to 1960.

== Premise ==
This series concerned the Chevaliers, a middle-class family in Quebec City's upper town. Accountant Fred Chevalier, originally from the less affluent Lower Town, lived with his wife Pauline and children Denis, Diane, and Pierre. However, the accountant's salary was not sufficient to support the upscale lifestyle the family attempted to enjoy. Denis knew of the discrepancy between the family's financial situation and lifestyle while Pierre belonged to a gang and Diane joined her mother in presenting the family as affluent.

Roger Lemelin (La famille Plouffe) was the series writer. It was produced in French for Radio-Canada with scripts translated to English for the CBC by Richard Daignault.

== Scheduling ==
The French version of the series was broadcast on Radio-Canada from 1959 to 1961. The English half-hour series was telecast on CBC Mondays at 10:30 p.m. (Eastern) from 12 October 1959 to 27 June 1960.

== Cast ==
- Roland Chail as Fred Chevalier
- Denise Pelletier as Pauline Chevalier
- Louis Turenne as Denis Chevalier (older son)
- Catherine Begin as Diane Chevalier
- Roland Bedard as Onsime Menard (a bus driver, seen previously in La famille Plouffe)
- Doris Lussier as Père Gédéon (seen previously in La famille Plouffe)
