= A Place of Your Own =

- Country of origin: Canada
- Original language: English
- No. of seasons: 3

Production
- Producer: Dennis Hargraves
- Running time: 30 minutes

Original release
- Network: CBC Television
- Release: 2 October 1968 – 25 September 1971

A Place of Your Own is a Canadian television program that aired on CBC Television from 1968 to 1971.

== Premise ==
This series was an afternoon repackaging of series that had previously aired on the morning-based Canadian School Telecasts.

== Scheduling ==
This half-hour time block aired Wednesdays at 4:30 p.m. (Eastern) in the 1968-1969 season, moving to Mondays at 4:30 p.m. the following year. It returned to Wednesdays in 1970, from 30 September to 30 December. A final run of the series was broadcast Saturdays at 1:00 p.m. from 3 July to 25 September 1971.
