= On the Frontier of Space =

- Genre: Science documentary
- Presented by: Norman Caton; Alexander Webster; Jack Alexander
- Country of origin: Canada
- Original language: English
- No. of seasons: 1
- No. of episodes: 3

Production
- Producer: Norman Caton
- Running time: 30 minutes

Original release
- Network: CBC Television
- Release: 21 March – 18 April 1959

On the Frontier of Space is a Canadian science documentary television miniseries that aired on CBC Television in 1959.

== Premise ==
This series presents the 20th century development of outer space travel technology, and speculates on its future development. Footage was compiled from Canada, the Soviet Union and the United States. Interviews with experts such as Wernher von Braun were included.

== Scheduling ==
This series was broadcast on alternate Saturdays at 6:00 p.m. (Eastern) as follows. The American series Panic!/No Warning! was broadcast in other weeks.

== Episodes ==
1. 21 March 1959: overview of launch vehicles such as rockets and missiles since World War II
2. 4 April 1959: describes the man-machine relationship of outer space travel
3. 18 April 1959: discusses the potential and pitfalls of space travel
