= Two for Physics =

- Genre: Science
- Presented by: Patterson Hume; Donald Ivey
- Country of origin: Canada
- Original language: English
- No. of seasons: 1
- No. of episodes: 12

Production
- Producer: George Dick
- Production location: Toronto

Original release
- Network: CBC Television
- Release: 7 July – 29 September 1959

Two for Physics is a Canadian science television program that aired on CBC Television in 1959.

== Premise ==
This Toronto-produced program on scientific subjects concerned the realm of physics. It was hosted by Patterson Hume and Donald Ivey, professors with the University of Toronto who were previously featured on the local CBLT program Live and Learn.

== Shows ==
Date	Topic
7 July	debut
14 July	
21 July	atoms and orbits
28 July	matter and radiation
4 August	theory of relativity
11 August	concerns efforts to analyze phenomena that are either too small or too large to be measured with existing technology
18 August	
25 August	
1 September	atomic nucleus
8 September	generating power by nuclear fission and fusion
15 September	using atomic decay to measure the age of archeological artifacts
21 September	(pre-empted)
28 September	series finale

== Scheduling ==
This half-hour program was broadcast on Tuesdays at 10:30 p.m. from 7 July to 29 September 1959.
