= Now's Your Chance =

Canadian TV program

- Genre: Variety show
- Country of origin: Canada
- Original language: English
- No. of seasons: 2

Production
- Production location: Toronto
- Running time: 30 minutes

Original release
- Network: CBC Television
- Release: 11 September 1952 – 6 May 1954

Now's Your Chance is a Canadian variety talent show that aired on CBC Television from 1952 to 1954.

== Premise ==
This program featured new, non-established talent. It was produced at CBC Toronto as one of the first productions of CBC Television.

== Scheduling ==
This half-hour program was broadcast on Thursdays at 8:00 p.m. (Eastern) from 11 September 1952 to 6 May 1954.

== See also ==
- Canadian Idol
