= Film Fun (TV series) =

- Country of origin: Canada
- Original language: English
- No. of seasons: 1
- No. of episodes: 5

Production
- Producer: Brian Frappier

Original release
- Network: CBC Television
- Release: 4 December 1974 – 15 January 1975

Film Fun is a Canadian children's television miniseries on animated filmmaking that aired on CBC Television from 1974 to 1976.

== Premise ==
This Ottawa-produced program featured the techniques of filmmaking for a young audience, focusing on animation. Briam Smyth hosted the series with filmmaking siblings Bryan and Nancy Stoller. Guests such as Don Arioli (National Film Board of Canada), Ben McPeek (composer), Ken Perkins (Winnipeg animator), Sebatian (Montreal film producer). One location segment featured computer animation at the National Research Council.

== Scheduling ==
This five-episode half-hour series aired Wednesdays at 5:00 p.m. (Eastern) between 4 December 1974 and 15 January 1975. Episodes were rebroadcast on Tuesdays at 5:00 p.m. from 5 to 26 October 1976.
