= Drama at Ten =

- Genre: Drama anthology
- Country of origin: Canada
- Original language: English
- No. of seasons: 2
- No. of episodes: 5

Production
- Running time: 60 minutes

Original release
- Network: CBC Television
- Release: 25 July 1955 – 20 August 1956

Drama at Ten is a Canadian drama anthology television miniseries that aired on CBC Television from 1955 to 1956.

== Premise ==
The series rebroadcast dramas that were previously featured on General Motors Theatre.

== Scheduling ==
This hour-long series was broadcast on Mondays at 10:00 p.m. (Eastern) from 25 July to 8 August 1955, and from 13 to 20 August 1956.

== Episodes ==
- 25 July 1955: Roman Gesture (Silvio Narizzano producer; Ira Perry writer)
- 1 August 1955: Witch Magic is White? (Martyn Coleman writer; Leslie Duncan adaptation),
- 8 August 1955: Deadlier Than the Male (Terry Newman writer)
- 13 August 1956: The American
- 20 August 1956: Flight into Danger (Arthur Hailey writer)
