= Stage Door (TV program) =

- Genre: Variety show
- Presented by: Lloyd Robertson
- Country of origin: Canada
- Original language: English
- No. of seasons: 1

Production
- Producer: Neil Harris
- Running time: 30 minutes

Original release
- Network: CBC Television
- Release: 17 January – 10 April 1960

Stage Door is a Canadian music variety show that aired on CBC Television in 1960.

== Premise ==
Lloyd Robertson hosted this Winnipeg-produced program with regular performers Georges LaFleche, Norma Vadeboncoeur and the Stage Four vocal quartet. Music was directed by Bob McMullin.

== Scheduling ==
This half-hour program was broadcast Sundays at 1:00 p.m. (Eastern) from 17 January to 10 April 1960.
