= My Kind of Country (Canadian TV program) =

Canadian country music television program

- Genre: Country music
- Starring: Ray St. Germain
- Country of origin: Canada
- Original language: English
- No. of seasons: 1
- No. of episodes: 13

Production
- Producer: Larry Brown
- Production location: Winnipeg
- Running time: 30 minutes

Original release
- Network: CBC Television
- Release: 11 April – 17 July 1971

My Kind of Country is a Canadian country music television program that aired on CBC Television in 1971.

== Premise ==
This Winnipeg-produced program featured regulars Ray St. Germain, Dennis Olson, Melody Renville and Al Weldon. The house band was led by Ron Halldorson.

== Scheduling ==
This half-hour program was broadcast Saturdays at 10:30 p.m. (Eastern) from 11 April to 17 July 1971.
