= Canada Vignettes =

Series of short films by the National Film Board of Canada

Canada Vignettes are a series of short films by the National Film Board of Canada (NFB), some of which aired on CBC Television and other Canadian broadcasters as interstitial programs. The vignettes became popular because of their cultural depiction of Canada, and because they represented its changing state, such as the vignette Faces which was made to represent the increasing cultural and ethnic diversity of Canada. The Log Driver's Waltz directed by John Weldon set to the recording of the song by Kate & Anna McGarrigle with, and as part of, The Mountain City Four is one of the most-requested items contained in the collection by the National Film Board of Canada. A similar series was later produced in the 1990s, however the name was changed to Heritage Minutes.

== Conception ==
The idea for Canada Vignettes began in early 1977, when CBC's children's programming department at the CBC approached the NFB about producing short films, five minutes in length or less, to use as interstitial programming. When Secretary of State for Canada John Roberts announced in the fall of 1977 that $13 million would be given to federal cultural agencies to help promote national unity, the NFB was allocated $2 million to produce films for broadcast on the CBC, similar to CBS's Bicentennial Minutes in the United States, the previous year. The French-language service of the CBC also agreed to broadcast the series.

== Production ==
Eighty filmmakers from across the country worked on the project over a three-year period. Many of the films were animation vignettes offering amusing portrayals of Canadian history, while others were produced from excerpts of NFB documentaries. The NFB decided that no film credits would be included, only a title.

== Broadcast ==
The CBC's children's department subsequently informed the NFB that it could not show films longer than two minutes as their needs had changed in the time that it took to produce the series. A quarter of the vignettes were more than two minutes long. As a solution, the CBC main network agreed to make the longer and shorter films available to their network affiliates. Canada Vignettes were shown on both in prime time and during children's programming slots. The most popular film in the series to air on Canadian television was Canada Vignettes: Faces, an animated short that depicted the faces of Canada, including that of then Prime Minister Pierre Elliot Trudeau. Other Canadian television networks to broadcast the films included CTV, Global, TVOntario, and TVA. The series was also sold to international foreign broadcasters in such countries as Turkey, Italy, Algeria, Norway and the United Kingdom.

== List of Vignettes ==
Title	Year	Duration	Notes
Acadian Quadrille	1978	4:00	director: Colette Blanchard; subject: the traditional Acadian dance, the quadrille
Agnes Campbell MacPhail	1980	2:05	director: Margaret Wescott; subject: Agnes Macphail, Canada’s first female MP
Alouette	1979	0:30	director: Michèle Pauzé; subject: animation set to the French-Canadian song “Alouette”
Angel of Death	1980	2:00	director: Ron Webber; subject: Toronto Daily Star’s 1912 fly-swatting contest
Arctic Mission	1980	1:00	director: Joan Henson
Arctic Seascape	1980	1:30	director: Joan Henson
Bellevue House	1980	2:10	
Bells and Brass	1978	3:00	director: Rick Butler
Bethune Memorial House	1980	2:52	
Bill Miner	1978	1:00	director: Peter Jones
Bill Reid	1979	2:00	director: Jack Long; subject: Haida artist Bill Reid
Birth	1980	1:00	director: Margaret Pettigrew
The Blacksmith Shop	1979	1:00	directors: Rita Roy, Joe MacDonald
Bluenose 1921-1946	1979	2:05	director: Richard Todd; subject: the schooner Bluenose
Bluenose II July 24, 1963	1979	3:07	director: Richard Todd; subject: the schooner Bluenose II
Breadmakers	1980	1:30	director: Tony Ianzelo
Bridge for the Dempster	1980	2:00	director: Kenneth McCready, Joan Henson; subject: construction of Dempster Highway by the Canadian Armed Forces
Bridging the Gap	1981	1:00	director: M. Marilyn Cherenko; subject: allegory about the necessity of societal integration of people with disabilities
Calliope	1980	2:00	director: Tony Ianzelo
Canada's Snowbirds	1980	1:30	director: Joan Henson
Captain Cook	1978	1:00	director: Barry Helmer
Catapult Canada	1985	1:09	director: Bill Maylone
Celebration	1981	1:00	director: Tony Ianzelo
Countdown	1981	1:00	director: Veronika Soul; subject: filmmaking techniques and processes
Cree Conical Lodge	1980	2:00	director: Joe MacDonald
Cree Hunters	1979	1:00	director: Tony Ianzelo
Crossing Guards	1978	4:10	director: Kris Paterson
Dance	1979	2:00	director: Lise-Hélène Larin
Dancing Dolls	1980	1:30	director: Dorothy Courtois
December Lights	1979	3:00	director: Raymond Gauthier; subject: a version of a traditional Franco-Manitoban Christmas tale
Delta Plane	1979	1:30	directors: Hubert Neault, Nicole Robert
The Dentist	1978	5:00	director: Wolf Koenig
Don Messer - His Land and His Music - Charlie Chamberlain 1911-1972 Pt. 1	1979	2:00	director: Martin Defalco
Don Messer - His Land and His Music - Charlie Chamberlain 1911-1972 Pt. 2	1979	1:00	director: Martin Defalco
Don Messer - His Land and His Music - Charlie Chamberlain 1911-1972, Marg Osburne 1927–1977	1979	2:00	director: Martin Defalco
Don Messer - His Land and His Music - Don Messer 1910-1973	1979	1:00	director: Martin Defalco
Don Messer - His Land and His Music - Marg Osburne 1927-1977 Pt. 1	1979	2:00	director: Martin Defalco
Don Messer - His Land and His Music - Marg Osburne 1927-1977 Pt. 2	1979	2:00	director: Martin Defalco
Easter Eggs	1978	3:00	director: Yurij Luhovy; subject: pysanky, traditional Ukrainian decorated eggs
The Egg	1979	1:00	directors: Robert Bélisle, Jean-François Pouliot
Emergency Numbers	1984	2:00	director: John Weldon
Erik Davidson - Mechanic	1979	3:03	director: Richard Todd
Faces	1978	1:00	director: Paul Bochner
Fashion Designer	1977	2:00	directors: Rosemarie Shapley, Judith Potterton
Flin Flon	1978	3:00	director: Tina Horne
Fort Prince of Wales	1978	1:00	director: Brad Caslor
From Cobalt to Casa Loma	1978	2:00	director: Kenneth McCready
From Flax to Linen	1978	2:00	director: Joe MacDonald
Full Circle	1979	4:00	director: Rudi Wrench
The Ham	1978	4:00	director: Ronald Blumer
Headdress	1979	1:30	
Helen Law	1979	3:00	director: Jennifer Hodge
History for Tomorrow	1980	1:00	director: Joan Henson
Holidays	1978	1:03	director: Blake James
Home of the Beaver	1978	3:00	director: Ron Webber
Homestead	1980	1:00	director: Margaret Pettigrew
The Horse	1978	1:00	director: Michael Mills
Hudden and Dudden and Donald O'Neary: An Irish Folktale	1978	5:00	director: Eva Szasz
Ice	1982	1:00	director: Robert Doucet
Ice Carnival Montreal 1885 - Canadian Bounce	1986	2:00	director: Meilan Lam
Ice Carnival Montreal 1885 - Souvenir Programme	1986	2:02	director: Meilan Lam
Ice Carnival Montreal 1885 - Storming the Ice Palace	1986	1:58	director: Meilan Lam
Indian Pipe	1979	1:00	
Instant French	1979	1:00	director: André Leduc
Inuit Pipe	1979	1:30	
Inverarden House	1980	2:13	
June in Povungnituk - Quebec Arctic	1980	1:00	director: Alanis Obomsawin
Klondike Gold	1980	1:00	director: George Geertsen
Lady Frances Simpson	1978	1:00	director: Christopher Hinton
Land Bridge	1978	1:00	director: George Geertsen
La mer enligne nos terres	1979	3:00	director: Phil Comeau
Land of the Maple Leaf	1978	3:00	director: Ron Webber
Log Driver's Waltz	1979	3:17	director: John Weldon
Logger	1978	1:00	director: Al Sens
Love on Wheels	1979	4:00	directors: Ben Low, Ian Rankin
Ma chère Albertine	1979	5:00	director: Suzanne Oliver
The Maple Leaf	1978	1:00	director: Paul Bochner
Marine Biologist	1979	3:00	director: William Pettigrew
Maritimes Dig	1980	3:00	director: Dennis Sawyer
McIntosh	1979	1:30	director: Tina Horne
Melvin Arbuckle, Famous Canadian	1980	5:00	director: Eva Szasz
Men of the Deeps, Cape Breton	1978	2:00	director: Sandra Dudley
Mer enligne nos terres, La	1979	3:00	director: Phil Comeau; subject: Acadian Nova Scotians
Métis Coat	1979	1:00	
Moccasins	1979	1:00	
The Move	1985	5:00	director: Larry Bauman
The Music Makers	1979	2:02	director: Malca Gillson
Mussel Mud	1985	1:38	director: Aileen Brophy
Newfoundland	1978	1:00	director: George Geertsen
News Canada	1978	3:00	director: Yossi Abulafia credited as Yossi Abolafia
Nigogeux, Les	1978	5:00	director: Robert Haché
Northern Seasons	1980	1:00	directors: Kenneth McCready, Joan Henson
The Novelist	1978	5:00	director: Andy Thomson
Onions and Garlic: A Hebrew Fable	1978	4:02	director: Eva Szasz
Our Daily Bread	1979	3:00	director: Joe MacDonald, Rita Roy
The Performer	1978	3:00	director: Norma Bailey. First Jury Prize for Short film at the 1980 Cannes Film Festival
The Photographers	1978	4:00	directors: Rosemarie Shapley, Judith Potterton
Physiotherapist	1977	3:00	directors: Rosemarie Shapley, Judith Potterton
Port Royal	1978	1:00	director: Robert Doucet
Prairie Promise	1980	1:00	director: Margaret Pettigrew
Prehistoric Artifacts, New Brunswick	1980	2:00	director: Dennis Sawyer
Riverdale Lion	1979	1:00	director: David Verrall
Roulamour	1979	4:00	directors: Ben Low, Ian Rankin
The Seigneury	1978	3:00	director: Janice Brown
Skier	1978	2:00	
Sodbusters	1978	1:00	director: Wolf Koenig
Spence's Republic	1978	1:00	director: Brad Caslor
St. Laurent Pilgrimage	1985	2:00	director: Dan J. McCrimmon
Stunt Family	1978	3:00	director: Lois Siegel
The Thirties	1978	1:03	director: Blake James
Toronto	1978	1:00	director: Carlos Marchiori
Trading Post	1978	1:00	director: Wolf Koenig
Trees	1978	1:00	director: Robert Doucet
Two Friends	1979	3:00	director: Richard Todd
Under the Pole	1980	1:00	director: Joan Henson
Unity Pole	1979	2:00	director: Jack Long
The Veteran	1978	4:00	director: Ronald Blumer
Veterinarian	1977	3:00	directors: Rosemarie Shapley, Judith Potterton
Vignettes from Labrador North	1979	4:00	director: Roger Hart
The Violin Maker	1978	5:00	directors: Rosemarie Shapley, Judith Potterton
The Visitor	1979	1:00	
The Vote	1980	1:00	director: Margaret Pettigrew
Voyageurs	1978	1:00	director: Wolf Koenig
Wild Rice Harvest Kenora	1979	1:00	director: Alanis Obomsawin
Winter - Dressing Up	1979	1:00	director: Gerald Potterton
Winter - Starting the Car	1979	2:00	director: Gerald Potterton
Woodside House	1980	2:07	
The Wool Spinner	1979	2:00	directors: Rita Roy, Joe MacDonald
Woolly Mammoth	1979	1:00	director: Bill Maylone; stop-motion animation
Wop May	1979	5:00	director: Blake James; subject: aviator Wop May

== See also ==
- O Canada (Cartoon Network series that featured some of the animated Canada Vignettes shorts)
- Canada's Story
- Events of National Historic Significance
- Heritage Minutes
- Hinterland Who's Who
- National Historic Sites of Canada
- Persons of National Historic Significance
- The Greatest Canadian
