= Donn Reynolds =

Canadian singer and yodeler (1921–1997)

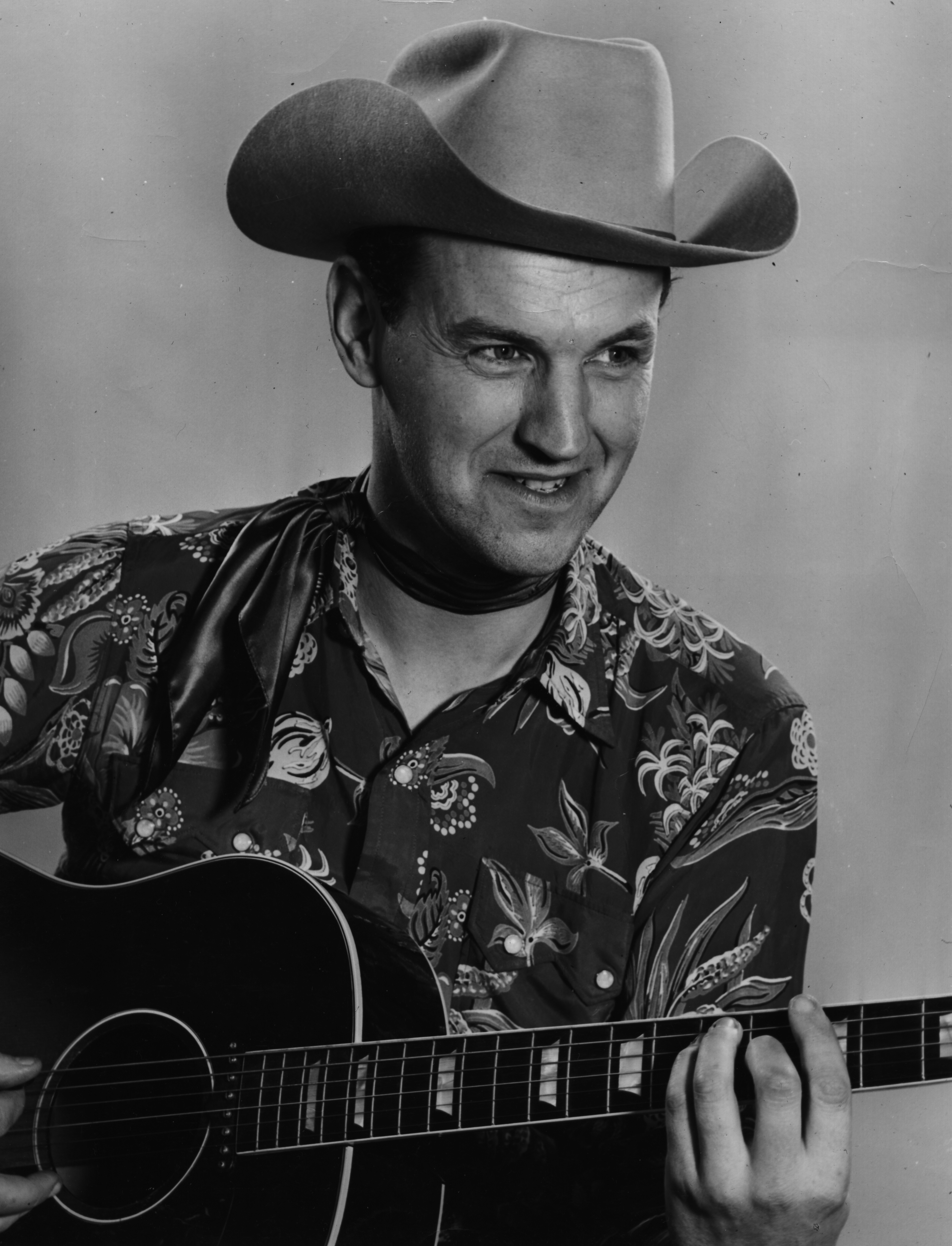

Background information
- Also known as: Donn Reynolds, King of the Yodelers
- Born: Stanley Beresford Reynolds; June 26, 1921; Winnipeg, Manitoba, Canada
- Origin: Brampton, Ontario, Canada
- Died: August 16, 1997 (aged 76) Toronto, Ontario, Canada
- Genres: Country, western
- Occupations: Singer, musician, songwriter
- Years active: 1947–1987
- Labels: MGM Records, Pye Nixa Records, Regal Zonophone, Quality Records, His Master's Voice (UK)
- Website: www.donnreynolds.com

Stanley Beresford "Donn" Reynolds (June 26, 1921 – August 16, 1997) was a Canadian country music singer and yodeler most widely known for his Bavarian style of yodeling. Often referred to as Canada's "king of the yodelers", Reynolds established two yodeling world records. He recorded 38 singles and six albums throughout a performing career spanning over 40 years.

== Biography ==
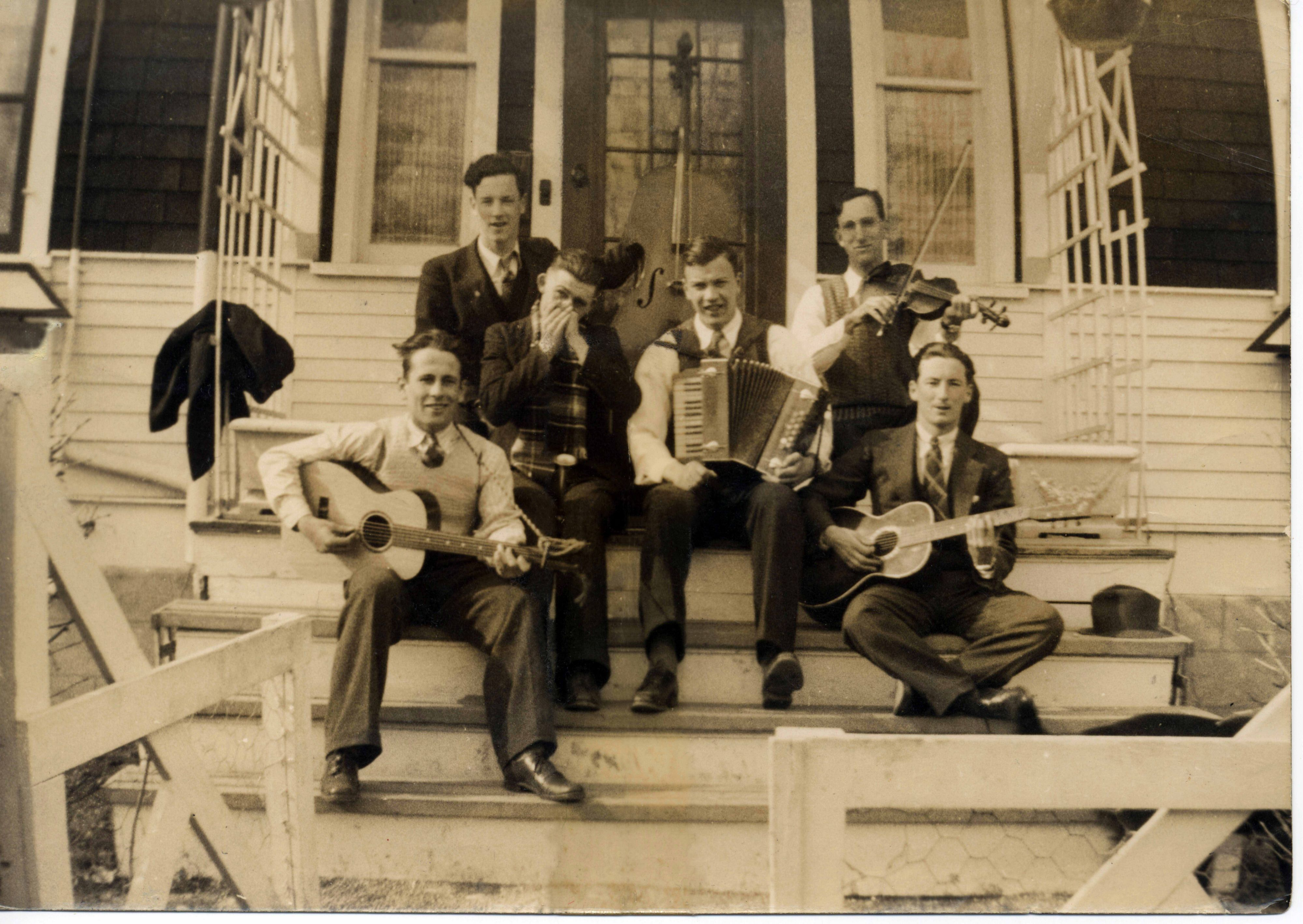
With his band as "The Yodeling Ranger" (1937).

=== Early years (1921-1936) ===
Donn Reynolds was born in St. Vital, Winnipeg, Manitoba, Canada on June 26, 1921. His parents, William Reynolds and Ethel Smith, migrated from England to Canada in 1907 after their marriage in 1905. He was youngest of three children, with older sisters Dora and Connie. Influenced by Harry Hopkinson (aka Harry Torrani), a popular British yodeler during the 1930s, Reynolds taught himself to sing and play guitar at 10 years of age. He first achieved local notoriety in 1936, winning a local radio (CKY Winnipeg) sponsored talent contest. By the age of 16, Reynolds had formed a band performing local clubs and theatres as "The Yodeling Ranger".

=== Military (1937-1945) ===
Through his father's encouragement, Reynolds headed for British Columbia in 1937 to work as a deckhand for Canadian Pacific Railway Coast Service aboard passenger steamships along the western coasts of Canada and the United States. Traveling with his guitar, he was popular for entertaining passengers and crew with frequent impromptu performances aboard each ship. After Canada's declaration of war in 1939, Reynolds became a Merchant Mariner in the Canadian Merchant Navy with Canadian Pacific Steamships. In 1941 he enlisted in the Royal Canadian Air Force assigned to deep-sea rescue operations in the Northern Pacific Aleutian Islands. While stationed at Bella Bella, BC, Reynolds married his first wife Catherine Norma Tompkins in Vancouver BC, on August 28, 1942. The couple had one daughter together named Diane. During service in the RCAF, Reynolds' vocal talent caught the attention of senior officers as he was often heard singing and yodeling throughout the ship. They facilitated his reassignment to the "Joe Boys", a Canadian military entertainment unit touring throughout Western Canada and Alaska performing for Canadian, American, British and Australian troops where he remained until the end of the Pacific campaign in 1945.

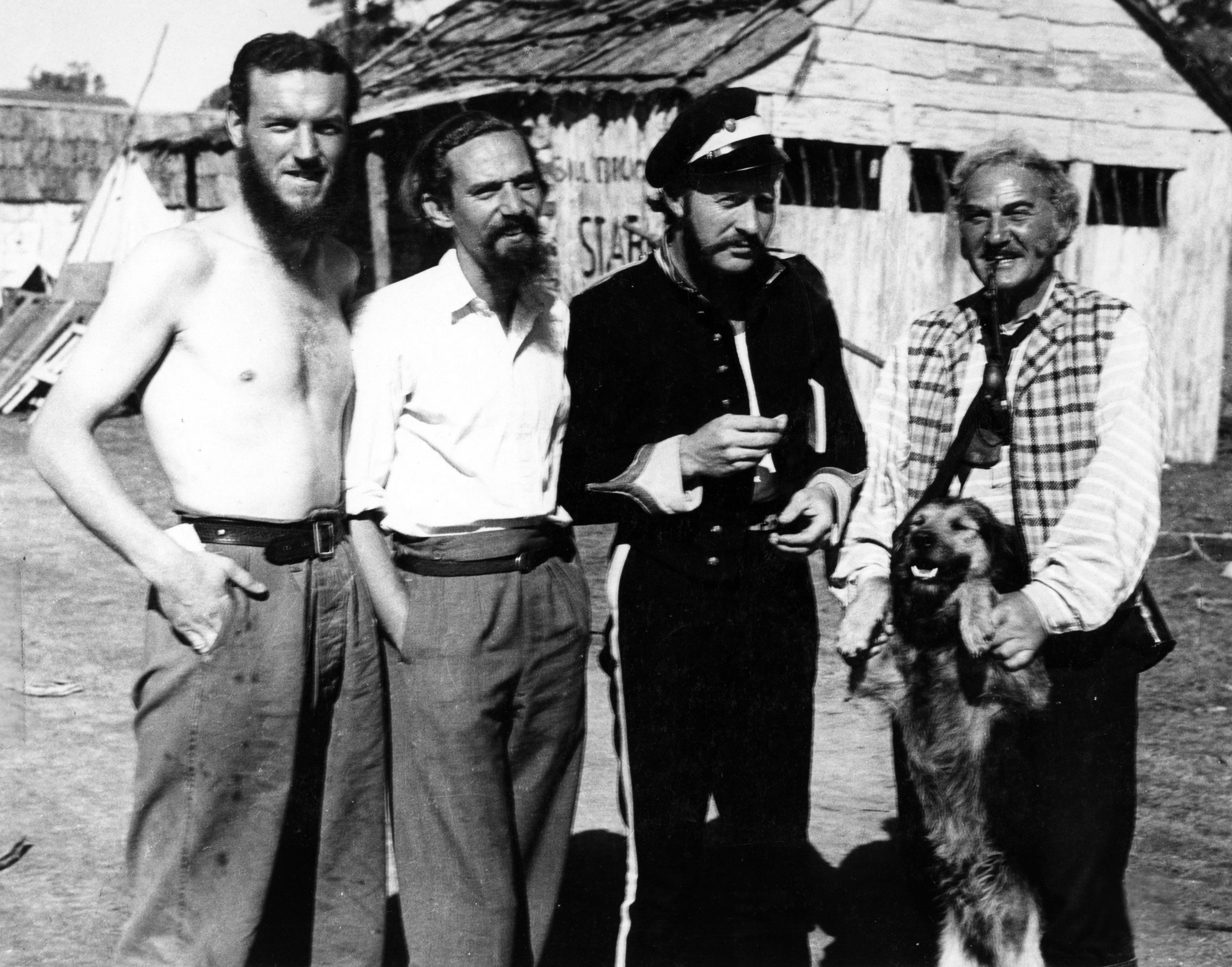
With Peter Finch, Grant Taylor, and Sydney Loder on film set of Eureka Stockade (1948).

=== Australia (1946-1948) ===
Upon completing his military service, Reynolds moved to New Zealand through an offer to tour the Kerridge Odeon circuit under contract with R.J. Kerridge. Success of the tour extended to Australia in early 1947 where he joined Western Cinemas Limited as a featured vaudeville performer in his own travelling hillbilly variety show and debuted over Australian radio performing weekly for Bob Dyer's Dude Ranch on 2FC. His appearances featured a heavy black beard he had grown for an acting role in the Australian film Eureka Stockade produced by Ealing Studios. The same year, Reynolds joined Willard (Bill) Ferrier's Famous Hillbillies along with budding Australian artists Johnny Ashcroft, The McKean Sisters, Dusty Rankin, and Billy Blinkhorn. Their shows were the first in Sydney to present a strictly all country music format.

Alongside pioneers Tex Morton and Slim Dusty, Reynolds was among Australia's earliest popular country music recording artists releasing several sides in 1947 for the Australian Columbia Graphophone Company on the Regal Zonophone label. Gaining popularity around the country, he became known as "Canada's Yodelling Cowboy" and regularly featured on national radio shows such as Cavalcade with Jack Davey, National Fair, Malvern Star Show, and RAAF Digger Sessions. He earned money playing theaters and halls in towns across New South Wales where people had heard him on the radio and travelled with Goldwyn Brothers Circus billed as the "Yodelling Cowboy". In October 1948, Reynolds became the voice of Australia's iconic Peters Ice Cream as the "Peter's Singing Cowboy". His signature five tone yodel garnered recognition as a regular feature of the Peters Pals radio show syndicated from Melbourne's 3XY.

=== United States (1949-1958) ===
Eager to extend his recent Australian popularity to America, Reynolds departed for Hollywood California in 1949 headlining "Red Barn Roundup" hoedowns with Dusty Ellison at the Avodon Ballroom in Los Angeles. His first U.S. single, "Texas Yodel", was declared a Cash Box "Bullseye of the Week" on July 2, 1949, prompting appearances throughout California's vaudeville theaters and dance halls. The song was covered by Wesley Tuttle on Capitol Records later that same year.

Forming a band in 1950, Reynolds toured the southwestern U.S. as "Donn Reynolds & his Westerners" drawing further attention upon winning the "World Open Yodelers Contest" on September 1, 1950 (awarded by Wilf Carter at the Pacific National Exhibition, Vancouver, BC) and later claiming the U.S. National Yodeling Championship in 1956 (awarded by Connie B. Gay in Washington, DC).

During a trend that saw American R&B record labels expanding into country music, Reynolds signed with Art Rupe of Specialty Records in January 1952. Recording sessions were held at John Keating Studios in Seattle, WA which remained unreleased until appearing on his 2013 compilation "Portrait of a Yodeler". Later that summer, Reynolds teamed up with western swing band leader Eddie Cletro, recording several singles for Lariat Records at the renowned Radio Recorders studio in Hollywood.

From 1950 through late 1956, Reynolds traveled the U.S. working in radio broadcasting while regularly appearing on stage and television across the country. Featured appearances include the Louisiana Hayride, WLS National Barn Dance, WWVA Jamboree, KRLD Big D Jamboree, Hollywood Theatre, WSAZ Saturday Night Jamboree, Herb Shriner's "Two for the Money", Valley View Park (with Roy Acuff), and his own regular TV show as "The TV Rangers" on WGAL-TV.

By 1956, Reynolds had settled in Cumberland, Maryland as a resident broadcaster for WCUM and host of its weekly Alleghany Jubilee variety show. He opened a local record shop "The Record Corral" specializing in country and spiritual music.

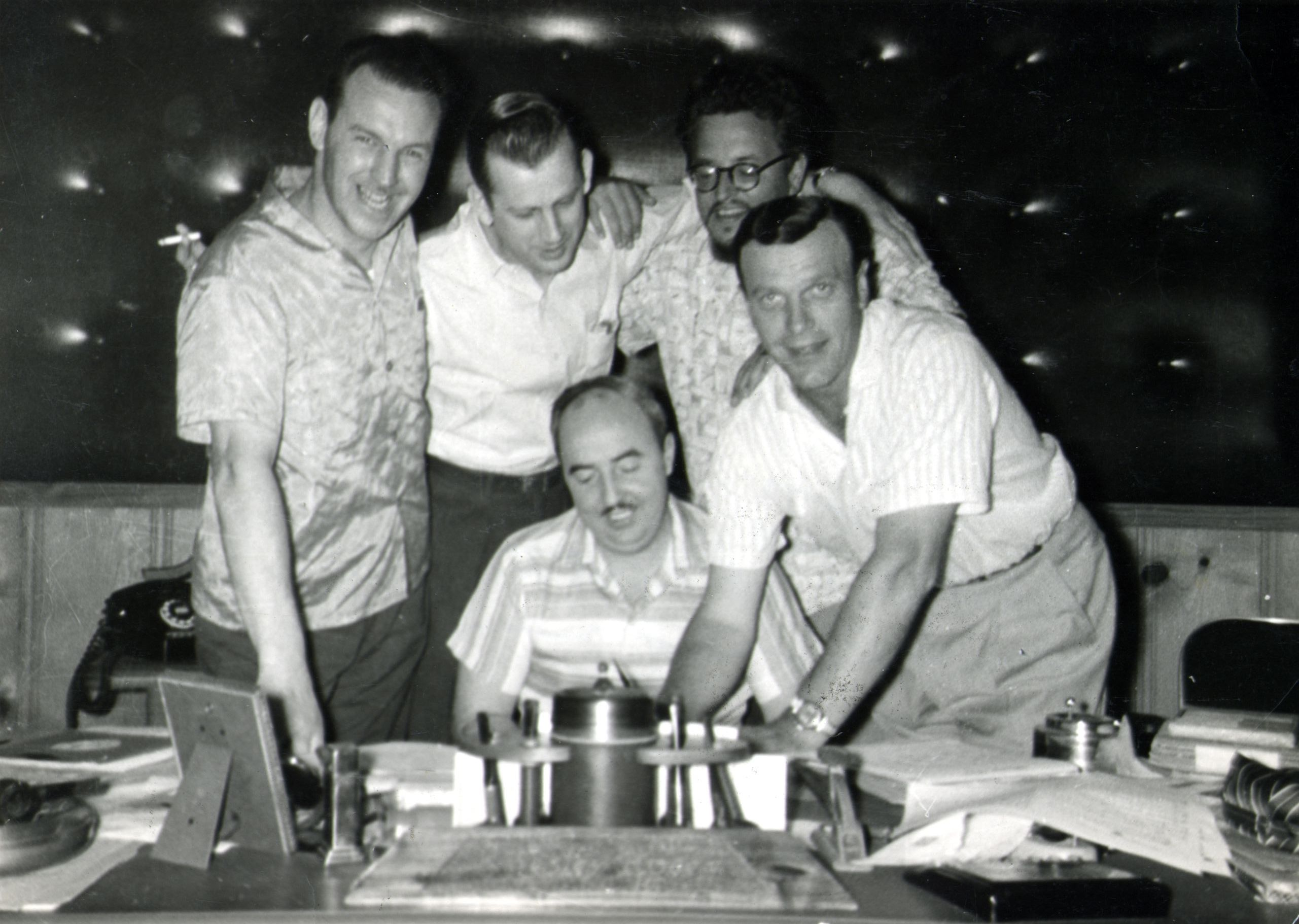
With George Morgan, Wesley Rose, Boudleaux Bryant, and Eddy Arnold at RCA studio (1957).

In late 1956 Reynolds traveled to the U.K., being among the earliest artists to have recorded in London's Lansdowne Studios with British producer Denis Preston. Twelve songs were recorded for EMI under engineering expertise of Joe Meek featuring prominent backing musicians Jack Fallon (bass), Danny Levan (violin), Sandy Brown (clarinet), and Al Fairweather (trumpet). Other U.K. appearances included BBC TV shows Bid for Fame, Fancy Free, In Town Tonight, Six Five Special, Radio Luxembourg with Gerry Wilmot, and as Davy Crockett in the Irish musical The Adventures of Davy Crockett.

Impressed with Reynolds’ talent, Preston arranged a U.S. record deal through his connections with MGM Records. Less than a year after arriving in the U.K. Reynolds returned to the U.S. in 1957 for recording sessions at Nashville's historic RCA McGavock Studio under direction of Wesley Rose (Acuff-Rose). Accompanied by Chet Atkins on guitar, Moon Mullican on piano, and famed Elvis backup singers The Jordanaires, the singles Rose of Ol' Pawnee, Bella Belinda, All Alone, and Blue Eyes Crying in the Rain were released on the MGM label. The singles were well received by Cash Box and Billboard Magazine reviews while promoted through moderate radio play and a tour across the U.S. featuring guest appearances on The Milt Grant Show (WTTG-TV) and Buddy Deane's Bandstand (WJZ-TV) in December 1957.

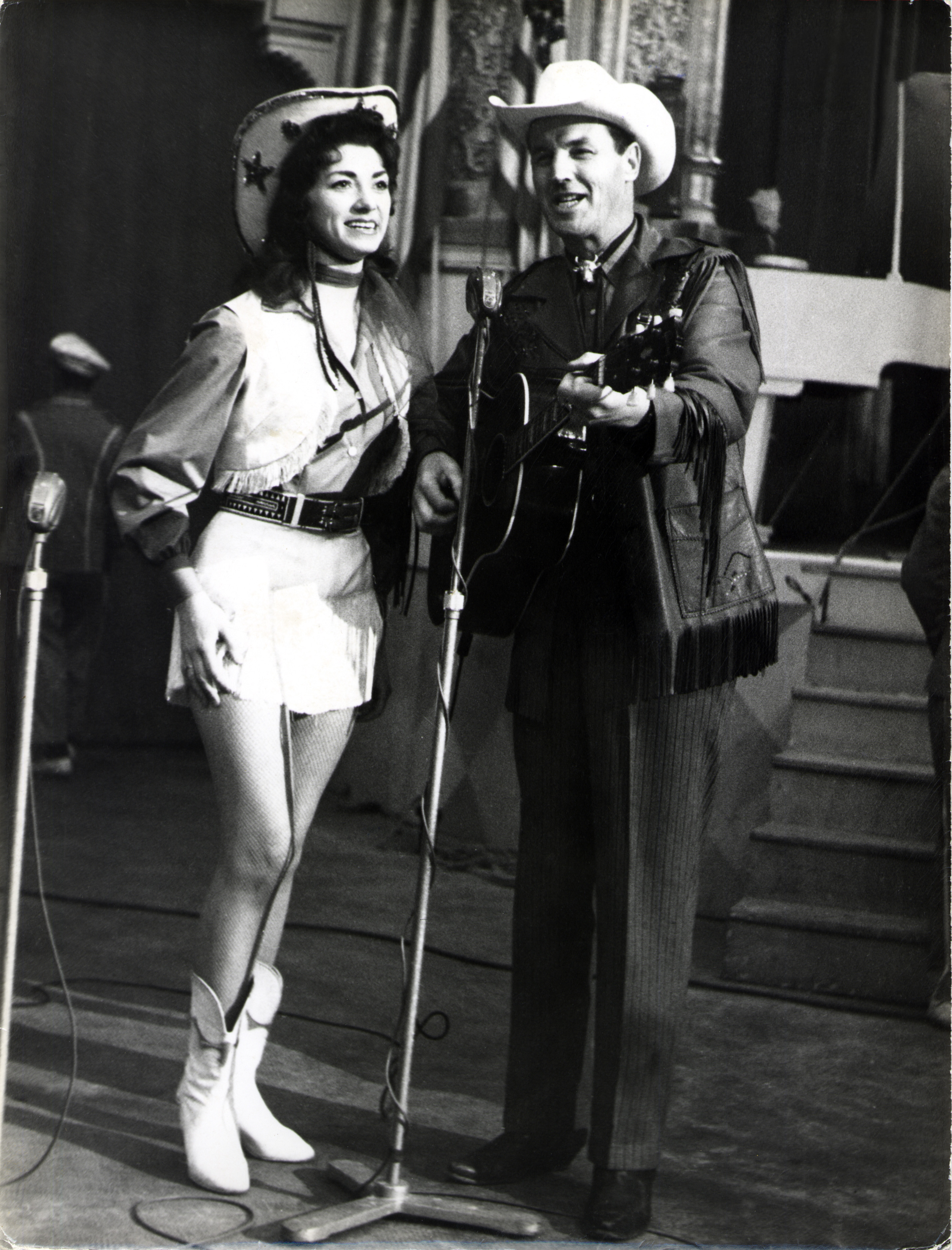
With Cindy at El Circo Price de Madrid (1960).

=== Europe (1959-1961) ===
With the U.K. release of his earlier EMI studio recordings on the Pye Nixa label, Reynolds returned in 1959 embarking on a European promotional tour of England, Sweden, Germany, Morocco, and Spain headlining performances at the Bavarian Grand Ole Opry, Liseberg Rondo, Circus Sarrasani, El Circo De Madrid, and Victoria Palace Theatre. Four songs were released in the U.K. on the Pye Records EP "The Donn Reynolds Song Bag" followed by four singles released in Denmark on Metronome Records coinciding with his tour dates there. In March 1960 Reynolds signed with Rank Records Ltd. to record his first LP album. Recording sessions began in May with sound engineer John Timperley at London's Olympic Studio using the industry's first transistorised control desk built by Dick Swettenham. Shortly after, the collapse of Rank Records Ltd. prevented the album's release with all recorded material subsequently being turned over to Reynolds.

During a performance in Mildenhall, Suffolk, England, Reynolds met Audrey Williams of the British performing trio, "The Three Skylarks". They married September 17, 1960, in Poulton-le-Fylde, England after which Audrey changed her name to Cindy Reynolds in response to media confusion with another famous Audrey Williams (wife of Hank Williams Sr.). Cindy later parted from The Three Skylarks to travel with Reynolds, combining vocal talents in duet performances during the remainder of his European tour. What was to have been a two-week working honeymoon tour of Spain actually lasted six months as Spanish audiences thrilled to their performances and persuaded the newlyweds to remain in their country several months longer.

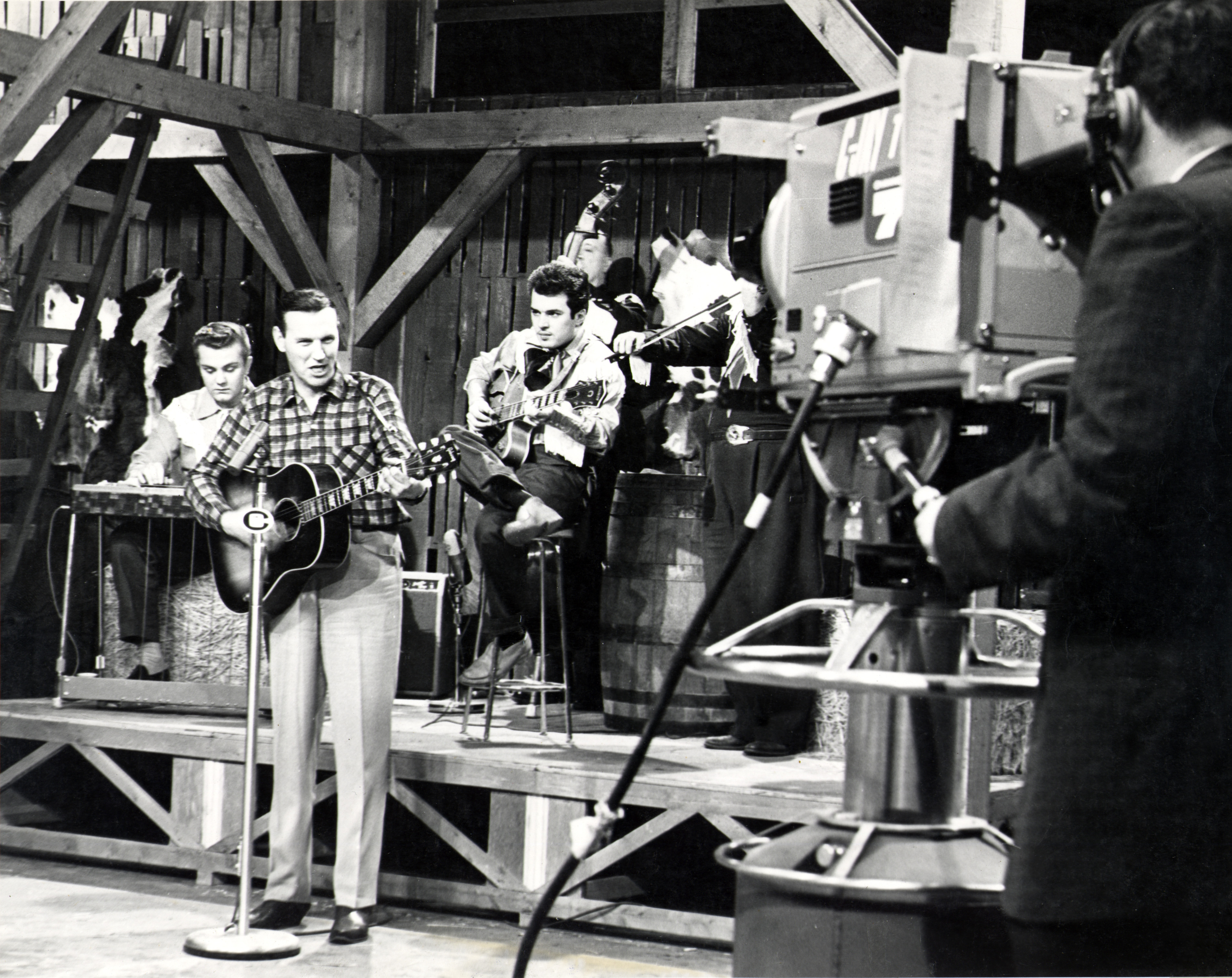
Reynolds on Cross Canada Barndance (1962).

=== Canada (1962-1969) ===
In October 1961 Reynolds returned with Cindy to his birthplace of Winnipeg, Manitoba joining the casts of national TV shows Cross Canada Barndance (CTV) and Red River Jamboree (CBC). Engaging television appearances promoted interest for Reynolds from Canadian music producers releasing his Rank Records material as The Wild One LP on the Banff label of Rodeo Records in 1962. The album received largely positive reviews producing two singles "No One Will Ever Know" (reaching No. 10 June 30, 1962) and "The Parting" with moderate airplay across the country. In the spring of 1963, lure of larger audiences and opportunity enticed the couple to head for Toronto, Ontario where they developed a smooth lounge club duet act touring for several years throughout the province. Their performances featured a variety of folk hits and pop standards, garnering significant local attention and praise from fans and media. Collaborating with acclaimed orchestra leader Lloyd Cooper of CBC-TV's Country Hoedown, they released duet recordings as "Donn & Cindy" on London Records and Sparton Records. The couple gave birth to their first child Gary in 1964 as demand for their appearances kept them on the road for weeks at a time.

Reynolds returned to the country music charts in 1965 with his solo single "Afraid" (reaching No. 1 February 22, 1965) followed by his second solo album The Blue Canadian Rockies containing singles "She Taught Me How To Yodel" (reaching No. 2 April 12, 1965), and "Lorelei" (reaching No. 4 November 29, 1965). In 1967 Reynolds released his third solo album Springtime in the Rockies containing the single "Shut the Door" (reaching No. 36 June 1, 1968). Through increasing popularity of both solo and duet appearances came an offer to tour and record in Bermuda prompting the couples travel to the island country in 1969. Unfortunately for Reynolds, contractual obligations with Arc Records prohibited him from recording the proposed duet album with Cindy and the studio sessions were cancelled. The couple moved to Brampton, Ontario in 1969 where Cindy gave birth to their 2nd child, Scott in 1971 and withdrew from the entertainment industry to pursue a successful marketing career.

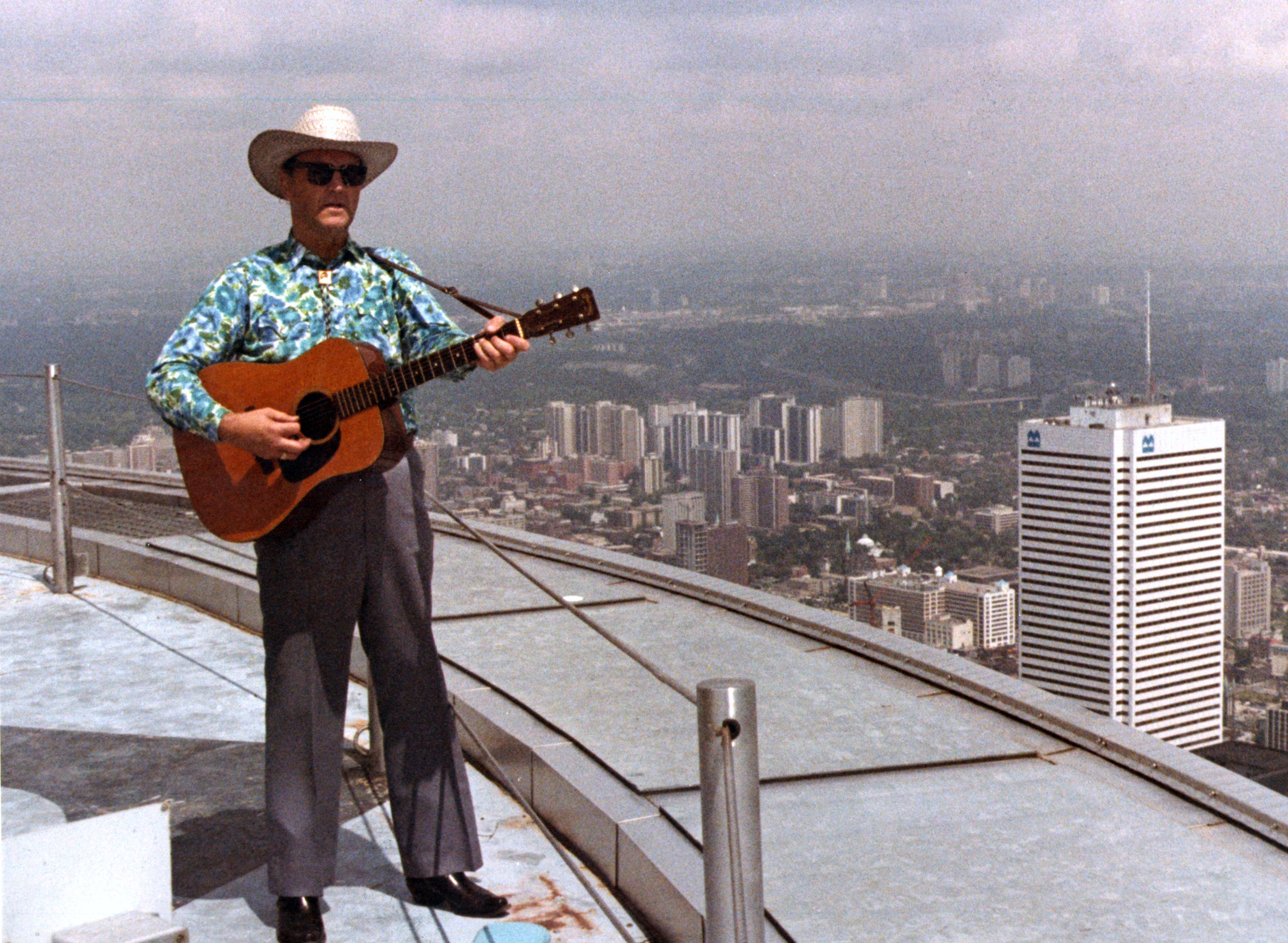
Reynolds performing outside atop the CN Tower (1980).

=== World records (1970-1985) ===
Throughout the 1970s, Reynolds maintained a healthy Canadian solo career featuring regular appearances on national television such as Country Hoedown (CBC), Carl Smith's Country Music Hall (CTV), Don Messer's Jubilee (CBC) and releasing his fourth LP album Songs of the West in 1974 before the birth of his 3rd son, Chad in 1976. National notoriety set the stage for a defining moment in Reynolds' career, when on November 27, 1976, he established a world record, yodeling non-stop for 7 hours and 29 minutes (Guinness Book of Records 1976). The accomplishment generated a surge of Canadian media attention including an appearance on Take 30 (CBC-TV) that saw Reynolds perform outside, atop the CN Tower, The Bob McLean Show (CBC-TV), and U.S. concerts with Claude King in New York. Renewed public acclaim inspired Reynolds to release his fifth LP album King of the Yodelers on Quality Records in 1979.

With persistent devotion to promoting the art of yodeling, Reynolds earned a second entry into the Guinness Book of Records, when on July 25, 1984, he became the world's fastest yodeler, achieving 5 tones (3 falsetto) in 1.9 seconds. The event was captured on the Canadian television show Pizazz! (Global-TV) and featured by Ripley's Believe it or Not! publications depicting Reynolds in cartoon form. Reynolds once again found himself amid a stir of media frenzy including appearances on The Tommy Hunter Show, The Alan Thicke Show, Claim to Fame (CTV-TV), Daytime Challenge (CBC-TV), Canada AM (CTV-TV), That's Life (Global-TV), Tempo Ontario (CKCO-TV), performances with Claude King in Brampton, Ontario and with Ronnie Hawkins for the Toronto Musician's Association.

=== Later years (1986-1997) ===
By the late-1980s, demand for Reynolds' appearances declined with lack of national exposure or new material. He struggled amidst a country music industry progressing toward more modern sound as promoters offered less work and little interest in his now obscure talent. Reynolds' worldwide fame waned to local popularity and guest appearances, although feature stories and interviews with Reynolds continued to circulate throughout national publications including International Musician, The Canadian Composer, Close Up, Country Music News, and Maclean's magazines.

In 1987, Reynolds signed with RCA Records, releasing a compilation of his most popular songs titled Donn Reynolds – King of the Yodelers. The album was promoted through performances across Southern Ontario and the Northeastern US, including the Appalachian Jubilee in Pennsylvania, Malton Festival and CKGL Summerfest Jamboree in Kitchener, Ontario. Among later professional appearances, Reynolds frequently starred in the annual Royal Winter Fair at the Canadian National Exhibition in Toronto along with annual performances at the Toronto Musical Festival and Canadian Country Music Hall of Fame Jamboree.

In April 1990, Reynolds became a member of the Masonic Order (Flower City Lodge No. 689) providing greater opportunity to serve the children's charities he passionately supported throughout his career. A brief return to the spotlight occurred June 25, 1990 on the BBC-TV show Record Breakers when Reynolds beat his previous world record for fastest yodel by achieving 5 tones (3 falsetto) in 0.93 seconds. The feat was later broadcast October 19, 1990 on BBC-TV.

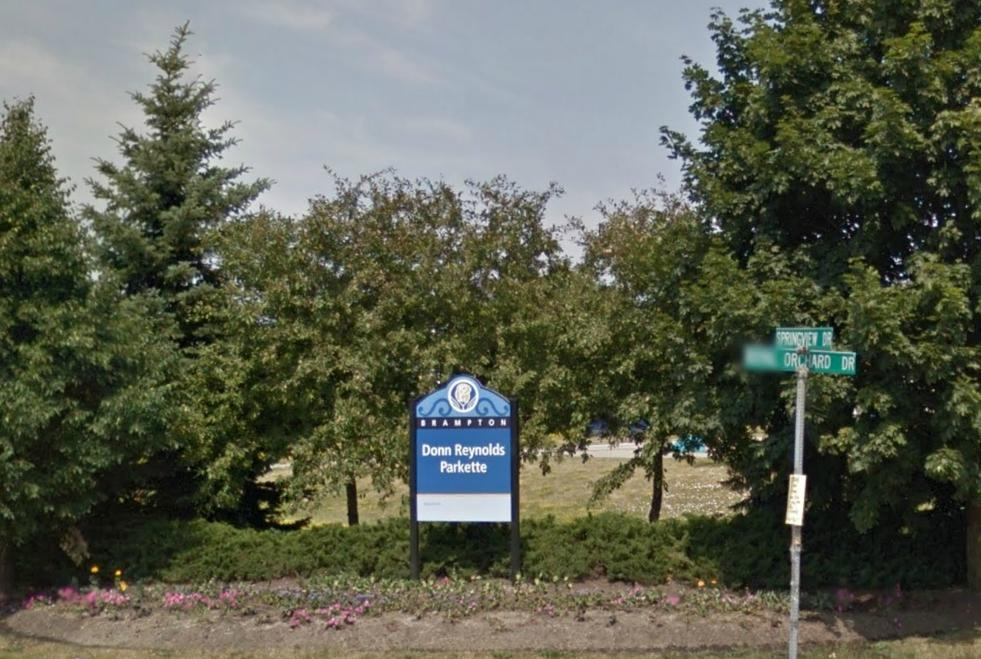
Donn Reynolds Parkette.

As health issues began limiting his ability to travel or perform, Reynolds settled at his home in Brampton, Ontario, Canada with Cindy and their three sons while continuing to work with children's charities. A video documentary highlighting various performances and achievements of Reynolds was entered into the Country Music Hall of Fame in Nashville, Tennessee while numerous audio recordings were entered into Library and Archives Canada. He died in Toronto on August 16, 1997 following complications from Alzheimer's disease and was interred in the Meadowvale Cemetery in Brampton, Ontario.

In 1998, the "Donn Reynolds Parkette" in Brampton, Ontario, was named in honour of Reynolds.

In 2002, Reynolds was honoured with a Canada Barn Dance Pioneer Award and inducted into the Barn Dance Hall of Fame.

== Discography ==
=== Albums ===
Year	Album	Label	Catalogue
1959	The Donn Reynolds Song Bag	Pye Nixa	NEP 24098
1962	The Wild One	Banff	RBS 1178
1965	The Blue Canadian Rockies	Arc	AS673
1967	Springtime in the Rockies	Arc	AS767
1974	Songs of the West	Marathon	MMS-76060
1979	King of the Yodelers	Quality	GS-1992
1987	Donn Reynolds	RCA	CK-5004
2013	Portrait of a Yodeler	BACM	CD D 422

=== Singles ===
Year	Single	Label	Catalogue
1947	Old Bush Shanty of Mine	Regal Zonophone	G 25160
1947	The Ring My Mother Wore	Regal Zonophone	G 25161
1947	Salt Bush Sue	Regal Zonophone	G 25162
1949	Texas Yodel	Selective	S-1X
1950	If I'd Only See'd You	Aragon	AR181
1952	I Tell Myself A Lie	Bullet	751
1952	The Night-In-Gale Song	Lariat	1107
1952	Don't Talk About Me	Lariat	1108
1952	Texas Yodel	Lariat	1109
1955	Don't Tell Me	Blue Hen	BH-207
1957	Rose of Ol' Pawnee	MGM	K12512
1957	Bella Belinda	MGM	K12573
1957	Hasta Luego	His Master's Voice	POP 314
1958	Swing Low Sweet Chariot	Pye Nixa	N.15122
1959	Swing Low, Sweet Chariot	Metronome	B 1341
1959	T. B. Blues	Metronome	B 1366
1961	The Parting	W&G	WG-S-1341
1962	The Parting	Citadel	CT3141
1962	No One Will Ever Know	Citadel	CT3149
1963	Rose of Ol' Pawnee	Quality	1578X
1963	Mountain Laurel	London	M.17303
1963	Texas Yodel	London	M.17306
1965	Afraid	Sparton	4-1315
1965	Wedding Bells	Sparton	4-1332
1965	Lorelei	Arc	A1114
1968	Shut The Door	Arc	A1208
1971	Texas Yodel	W&G	WG-S-8311
1974	Texas Yodel	Marathon	45-1131

== See also ==
- Music of Canada
- Canadian Country Music Hall of Fame
- Brampton, Ontario, Canada
- List of Freemasons

== Notes ==
- The Mercury (Hobart, Tas) Jan 25, 1950 "Just Saddle and Ride" single release in Australia
- The Biz (Fairfield, NSW) Sep 13, 1951 "Texas Yodel" & "The Parting" singles release in Australia
- The Biz (Fairfield, NSW) Jul 18, 1953 Australian Regal Zonophone records release in Australia
- National Film & Sound Archive Australia Donn Reynolds Australian media
- National Library of Australia Donn Reynolds Australian recordings
- Billboard 17 Jun 1950 MCA Records contract
- Billboard 26 Jan 1952 Imperial Records contract (Lou Chudd)
- Billboard 20 Nov 1954 CJOB Jamboree
- Billboard 29 Jul 1957 MGM Records review
- Billboard 16 Dec 1957 His Master's Voice released in UK
- Billboard 22 Sep 1962 Record review – "The Wild One"
- National Archives Canada Donn Reynolds Canadian charted singles
- Ontario newspaper index Donn Reynolds in newspaper archives of Ontario
