= Rich Little =

Canadian-American impressionist and actor (born 1938)

Rich Little OC
- Little in 1966
- Born: Richard Caruthers Little; November 26, 1938 (age 87); Ottawa, Ontario, Canada
- Spouses: Jeanne Worden (m. 1971; div. 1989) Jeannette Markey (m. 1994; div. 1997) Marie Marotta (m. 2003; died 2010) Catherine Brown (m. 2012; div. 2012)
- Partner: Melinda Saxe (1988–1991)
- Children: 2

Comedy career
- Years active: 1956–present
- Medium: Stand-up comedy; television
- Genres: Impersonations; celebrities

Richard Caruthers Little OC (born November 26, 1938) is a Canadian-American comedian, impressionist and voice actor. Sometimes known as the "Man of a Thousand Voices", Little has recorded nine comedy albums and made numerous television appearances, including three HBO specials.

== Early life ==
Little was born in Ottawa, Ontario, Canada, the middle of three sons, older brother Fred and younger brother Chris. His father, Lawrence Peniston Little, was a surgeon who served as a lieutenant commander in the Royal Canadian Naval Volunteer Reserve during World War II and then worked for the Department of Veterans' Affairs until his death in 1959. His mother, Elizabeth (Betty) Maud (née Wilson), was a housewife who grew up in Sarnia, Ontario.

A third-generation Canadian, he is descended from English stock on his father's side and Irish on his mother's. On his mother's side, he is descended from John Willson, who was Speaker of the 5th Parliament of Upper Canada in the 1820s. His maternal grandfather was a judge. His paternal great-grandfather, William Carruthers Little, was a Liberal-Conservative Member of Parliament in the Canadian House of Commons from 1867 to 1881.

He attended Lisgar Collegiate Institute. In his early teens, he formed a partnership with Geoff Scott, another budding impressionist (and future elected politician), concentrating on reproducing the voices of Canadian politicians such as Prime Minister John Diefenbaker and Ottawa mayor Charlotte Whitton.

== Career ==
=== Early career in Canada ===
Starting when he was 11, Little acted in two documentary movies for Crawley Films of Ottawa.

Little was an usher at the Elgin Theatre in Ottawa, where he perfected his voices while standing at the back of the theatre. He started his amateur acting career at the Ottawa Little Theatre, winning his first acting award at the Eastern Ontario Drama Festival in Deep River, Ontario for his role as “Bo Decker” in the play Bus Stop. At 17, he and his friend and fellow impressionist Geoff Scott won a talent contest on station CBOT in Ottawa, the first time he was paid for his impressionist skills, which led to an appearance on Pick the Stars, a national talent contest broadcast by CBC Television in 1956, where the duo tied for first place. This, in turn, led to an appearance on The Jackie Rae Show during the 1956–57 season during which Little premiered his impression of Ottawa mayor Charlotte Whitton to a national audience.

Little and Scott's comedy team performed at various local events and venues. Still in their teens, they developed a 10-minute act that they performed at Shriners' conventions and Knights of Columbus meetings. Scott later entered journalism, and ultimately politics.

Little began as a relief announcer on Ottawa radio station CFRA as a student during his summer vacations. He also performed comedy sketches with Les Lye on Lye's morning show. In the early 1960s, he was hired as a disc jockey on CJET in Smiths Falls, Ontario. His afternoon-evening shift ran from 4 to 8 pm weekdays, and the show gave him the opportunity to use his impressions on the air. In 1961, for 26 weeks, he co-hosted Folderol a half-hour suppertime show of light humour and interviews on television station CBOT.

By the 1960s, Little was taking his act to Toronto, where he performed at coffee houses, nightclubs, and other venues.

In 1963, Little issued two LPs through the Canadian division of Capitol Records. The first was My Fellow Canadians with his radio partner, Les Lye. The album was inspired by Vaughn Meader's hit American satirical album The First Family and concentrated on Canadian political satire, featuring Little impersonating figures well known to a Canadian audience such as Diefenbaker, Lester Pearson and Tommy Douglas. His second album was Scrooge and the Stars, which featured Little acting out Charles Dickens' A Christmas Carol entirely on his own, playing all the roles as 22 different Hollywood stars, ranging from Jack Benny to Jack Webb. The album was released in early November, but it was withdrawn a few weeks later due to the assassination of John F. Kennedy, as Little had imitated JFK in the role of the Spirit of Christmas Present and had Kennedy say the line "Scrooge, my life upon the globe is brief; it ends tonight. In fact, it ends as fast as you can say your name."

Little continued to build his reputation in Canada through appearances on CBC radio and television before moving permanently to the United States in late 1965 though he would continue to make appearances in Canada. In 1966, he starred in his own CBC Radio comedy series, The Rich Little Show.

=== Breaking into the US ===
Little's first performance in the United States was in December 1963 at Guy Lombardo's inn and country club in Tierra Verde, Florida.

Before entering the American market, Little had performed impressions on Canadian radio and television. After CJOH-TV began broadcasting in Ottawa in 1961, he appeared on the station impersonating celebrities such as Ed Sullivan and John Wayne. He subsequently worked as a disc jockey and talk-show host at CJET in Smiths Falls, Ontario, where his programmes also incorporated celebrity impressions.

Little's American career was helped by Peppiatt and Aylesworth, a Canadian writing team who had moved to Hollywood and worked on various specials and variety series, including The Judy Garland Show. Familiar with Little's work in Canada, Peppiatt had worked on The Jackie Rae Show, on which Little made a television appearance at 17, and the team had written Little's original Canadian nightclub act and would write much of his American material in the 1960s. They played a recording of Little for Garland and the show's musical director, Mel Tormé, and encouraged her to audition him. Tormé had met Little when they both performed on an episode of Parade, a CBC Television variety show in Toronto, and the two bonded over their interest in old films.

The audition won him the job, and in January 1964 Little made his American television debut on CBS's The Judy Garland Show, where he impressed Garland by imitating various male celebrities, including James Mason, who had been Garland's co-star in A Star Is Born. Television appearances on variety programmes hosted by Jackie Gleason, Rudy Vallée, Mike Douglas, George Burns, and Al Hirt followed over the next two years.

Peppiatt and Aylesworth also helped bring Little onto other American programmes for which they wrote, such as The Jimmy Dean Show, The Kopykats, and The Julie Andrews Hour, and continued to write material for his act after he moved permanently to the United States at the end of 1965.

Little made his first appearances on The Dean Martin Show and The Jimmy Dean Show during the 1965–1966 season.

By the late 1960s, he was making frequent appearances on The Ed Sullivan Show, The Dean Martin Show, Rowan & Martin's Laugh-In, Hollywood Squares, and The Tonight Show Starring Johnny Carson.

=== Nixon ===
During the 1970s, Little made many television appearances portraying American President Richard Nixon, and once performed his impersonation in front of Nixon himself, who Little says did not realize he was imitating him at all and "wondered why I was talking to him in such a funny voice." In 1972, he portrayed Richard Nixon with the voice and mannerisms of Oliver Hardy in Another Nice Mess. Little later appeared as Nixon on the soap opera Santa Barbara, in a 1991 fantasy sequence regarding Gina's ideal sperm donor. In 1992, he voiced Nixon in the animated film Bébé's Kids.

Little was part of an April Fool's Day prank in 1992 when he appeared on NPR's Talk of the Nation as Nixon announcing his candidacy for president in the 1992 United States presidential election using the slogan "I didn't do anything wrong, and I won't do it again." Listeners flooded NPR with calls expressing outrage at the announcement, which NPR did not reveal as a hoax until the second half of the program.

In 2020, Little developed Trial on the Potomac: The Impeachment of Richard Nixon, a play based on the 2015 book The Real Watergate Scandal: Collusion, Conspiracy, and the Plot That Brought Nixon Down by Geoff Shepard, alleging a conspiracy to remove Nixon from office. Little performed the show Off Broadway for a five-week run in 2021.

=== 1970s ===
Little appeared in the feature film The Phynx (1970). He was a semi-regular on the Emmy-winning ABC-TV variety series The Julie Andrews Hour in 1972–73. In response to his imitation of Jack Benny, the comedian sent Little an 18-carat gold money clip containing this message: "With Bob Hope doing my walk and you doing my voice, I can be a star and do nothing."

Little's best-known continuing TV series was The Kopycats, hour-long segments of The ABC Comedy Hour, broadcast in 1972. Taped in England, these comedy-variety shows consisted entirely of celebrity impersonations, with the actors in full costume and makeup for every sketch. The cast included Little, Frank Gorshin, Marilyn Michaels, George Kirby, British comedian Joe Baker, Fred Travalena, Charlie Callas, and Peter Goodwright.

Little was a regular guest on The Dean Martin Celebrity Roasts in the 1970s, appearing in 24 of the specials, where he roasted celebrities such as Don Rickles, Jack Benny, Johnny Carson, Frank Sinatra, Jimmy Stewart and Kirk Douglas.

The Rich Little Show (1975–1976) on NBC and The New You Asked for It (1981) were attempts to present Little in his own persona, away from his gallery of characterizations. Little also appeared on a second-season episode of The Muppet Show.

The one-man show Rich Little's Christmas Carol was his first HBO special, produced by and originally aired on CBC Television in December 1978 and airing on HBO in 1979. Little portrayed famous comedians in established roles (W. C. Fields as Ebenezer Scrooge, Paul Lynde as Bob Cratchit, et al.). The special won an International Emmy Award and a Rose d'Or award.

=== 1980s ===
In 1981, Little appeared in a comedy LP called The First Family Rides Again, which was the fourth and final of the First Family comedy LPs originally created by Bob Booker David Arvedon, and Earle Doud. Little starred along with Melanie Chartoff, Michael Richards, Shelley Hack, Jenilee Harrison, Earle Doud, and Vaughn Meader, making light of U.S. President Ronald Reagan's first few months in the White House.

Little hosted a syndicated revival of the human interest show, You Asked For It from 1981 to 1982. Little also appeared in dramatic and comedy series including Fantasy Island, CHiPs, Police Woman, MacGyver, Murder, She Wrote, The Love Boat, The Nanny, and Santa Barbara. He also appeared in the movies Dirty Tricks (1981), and Happy Hour (1987) and performed voice work in Better Off Dead (1985).

Another HBO special followed in 1983 with Rich Little's Robin Hood, including portrayals of Groucho Marx as Robin Hood, Humphrey Bogart as Prince John, John Wayne as Little John, Carol Channing as Maid Marion, Laurel and Hardy as Sheriffs of Nottingham, George Burns as Alan-a-Dale, and various other characters.

In June 1984, Little returned to Canada to perform at the nationally televised farewell gala honouring Prime Minister Pierre Trudeau at the Liberal Party's leadership convention in Ottawa. The gala, held on June 14, featured entertainers including Paul Anka, Maureen Forrester and Little, and preceded Trudeau's farewell address as Liberal leader.

Outside a comedic context, Little was also employed as a voice double when actors were unable to complete dialogue because of illness. He imitated David Niven for the actor's appearances in Trail of the Pink Panther (1982) and Curse of the Pink Panther (1983), provided the voice of James Cagney in the television film Terrible Joe Moran (1984) after Cagney had suffered a stroke, and supplied an uncredited voice dub for Gene Kelly in the 1991 television special Christmas at the Movies after Kelly had lost his voice.

He also lent his voice to the narration of three specials that were the forerunners for the animated series The Raccoons: The Christmas Raccoons (1980), The Raccoons on Ice (1981), and The Raccoons and the Lost Star (1983). His brother, Fred Little, voiced the character Cedric Sneer.

In 1987, during the We the People 200: The Constitutional Gala television special, Little personified various historical figures, including Franklin D. Roosevelt, Edward R. Murrow, John F. Kennedy, Martin Luther King Jr., and Robert F. Kennedy. Little's performance was described as eclectic, impersonating Henry Fonda as Abraham Lincoln and doing Winston Churchill giving a rousing speech. That same year, he provided the voice of Crispy, the mascot of Post's Crispy Critters cereal.

=== The Tonight Show ===
Little was a frequent guest on variety and talk shows in the 1960s and 1970s, and had an unofficial monthly slot on The Tonight Show Starring Johnny Carson for several years, and also guest hosted the program about a dozen times. He developed an impression of Johnny Carson, capturing The Tonight Show host's voice and many onstage mannerisms, and later played Carson in the HBO TV movie The Late Shift (1996). Little's appearances on the Tonight Show ended without notice after his August 1982 appearance. Little claims in his biography that he was banned because Carson was offended by his impression, and this claim was supported by Henry Bushkin, Carson's long-time lawyer, who stated that nobody got under Carson's skin more than Little. Little had been doing the impression since the early 1970s, though, a decade prior to his bookings on the show coming to an end, including performing the impression to the Tonight Show host's face when Carson was the guest of honor at The Dean Martin Celebrity Roast of Johnny Carson in 1973. In response to Little's claims, Fred DeCordova, Carson's producer, said they just were not interested in hiring him anymore due to his lack of new impressions.

=== Las Vegas career ===
Little has been appearing in Las Vegas since the mid-1960s, when he had dates at the Golden Nugget and went on to play at other Vegas venues such as The Sands, where he debuted in 1969 with a two-year contract. In 1973, he performed at Caesars Palace for four weeks as the opening act for The Osmonds. He then appeared at the Desert Inn with Juliet Prowse for a month in 1974. His appearances continued throughout the 1970s and 1980s; he headlined at the Desert Inn for eight years in the late 1970s and 1980s, at the MGM Grand with Nell Carter in 1985; at Bally's, with Charo in 1986; the Sands in 1991 and 1992, and at the Golden Nugget again in 1991.

With opportunities for him to work in television and film in decline, and his television work almost completely drying up by the mid-1980s, the focus of Little's career shifted from Hollywood to Las Vegas. The decline in his career was blamed in part on him not having updated his repertory of impressions with younger voices, a fact he blames on recent generations of actors using a naturalistic delivery that makes their voices less distinctive. "It's much easier to do Humphrey Bogart than Tom Cruise," he said. "How do you imitate Brad Pitt? George Clooney? Wouldn't mean anything."

Little sold his house in Los Angeles and relocated to Las Vegas in 1990, and bought a home in 1992, when he signed an exclusive, long-term contract with the Sahara, staging a revamped version of The Kopykats with other impersonators. He later moved to Paris Las Vegas, where he starred in The Presidents, a play on nine Presidents of the United States from Kennedy to George W. Bush, starting in 2002. In 2004, he moved to the Suncoast.

In the early 2010s, he performed a one-man show, Jimmy Stewart and Friends, based on the life of the actor, at the Westgate hotel, and on tour. After the death of Stewart in the late 1990s, Rich recorded the crosswalk messages for intersections in Stewart's hometown of Indiana, Pennsylvania, using his imitation of the star's voice.

From 2015 until 2024, Little was a regular performer at the Laugh Factory in the Tropicana hotel in Las Vegas. His one-hour show, Rich Little Live!, was a career retrospective including video highlights from his television career and was performed five nights a week. Throughout the show, he displayed many of the charcoal sketches he had drawn of the celebrities he impersonated. The Tropicana closed in April 2024 and was demolished that October to make way for a new stadium for the Athletics. Little said that he intended to return to the Laugh Factory once the club found a new location on the Las Vegas Strip.

Little performed at the Tuscany Suites and Casino's Copa Room from September 2025 until 2026, presenting his one-hour show three nights a week. On April 6, 2026, he began a residency at the new Laugh Factory, which had opened at the Horseshoe Las Vegas, performing three evenings a week.

Critical assessments of Little's stage act have sometimes distinguished between his technical ability as an impressionist and the quality of his material. Reviewing a 1990 performance, Jess Bravin of the Los Angeles Times wrote that Little relied on mimicry as an attraction in itself rather than using it to achieve a larger comic purpose. Bravin criticized the show's extended sketches, limited topicality and uneven resemblance of some impressions to their subjects, although he considered Little more effective when the impressions were presented briefly.

=== 2007 White House Correspondent's Association dinner ===
Little was the featured entertainer at the 2007 White House Correspondents' Association dinner. His selection was interpreted by some commentators as a deliberately uncontroversial response to Stephen Colbert's pointed performance at the previous year's dinner. Before the event, The Washington Post characterized Little's comedy as non-topical and observed that many of his best-known impressions were of performers and political figures who had died or were no longer prominent. Comedian Lewis Black was quoted criticizing the choice of Little calling his act dated and politically harmless.

Although President George W. Bush was reported to have enjoyed the performance, reviewers criticized Little's reliance on older material and impressions of deceased figures. Time later described the routine as a recycling of his established Johnny Carson and presidential impressions and included it among performances that had “bombed” at the annual dinner.

=== Other appearances since 2000 ===
Little appeared as a guest star in Futurama season two episode "Raging Bender" and the film Futurama: Bender's Game, playing his own celebrity head, impersonating Howard Cosell.

In 2017, Little released his memoir, Little by Little: People I Have Known and Been. In 2021, CBS News Sunday Morning profiled Little; during the interview, he stated he believed it was the first time he had been on network television in 30 years, and hoped it would "go over well!"

In 2018, he appeared as himself in the documentary They'll Love Me When I'm Dead about Orson Welles' final film The Other Side of the Wind. Little was in the original 1974 cast but left for other commitments and his scenes were reshot with Peter Bogdanovich playing the part. Bogdanovich completed directing the film in 2018 after Welles died in 1985. Little is credited as a party guest in The Other Side of the Wind.

Little was a frequent guest on Huckabee, former Arkansas Governor Mike Huckabee's talk show on the Trinity Broadcast Network, having appeared more often than any other guest. His last appearance was on the series finale, January 11, 2025.

=== Honours ===
Little was named "Comedy Star of the Year" by the American Guild of Variety Artists in 1974.

He was given a star on the Hollywood Walk of Fame in 1983.

In 1998, Little was inducted into Canada's Walk of Fame, and into the Casino Legends Hall of Fame in 1999. He was given a star on the Las Vegas Walk of Stars in 2005.

In 1998, a Golden Palm Star on the Palm Springs, California, Walk of Stars was dedicated to him. He was inducted into the Canadian Comedy Hall of Fame in 2001.

Little was appointed to the Order of Canada in 2022, with the rank of Officer.

== Other interests ==
Little has been active in several charities, including the Juvenile Diabetes Fund and the Children's Miracle Network. He has been named to Miami Children's Hospital International Pediatrics Hall of Fame and been honoured by the naming of the Rich Little Special Care Nursery at Ottawa Civic Hospital. He has been a major supporter in helping veterans through the Gary Sinise Foundation.

== Personal life ==
Little was engaged to Canadian actress Jean Christopher in 1965, but they did not marry.

Little was married to Jeanne Worden, whom he met when she was working as a secretary on The Joey Bishop Show, in 1971. The couple had a daughter together, Bria, before their divorce in 1989. Little had a brief relationship with Lalette Cottrell, of Delaware; the couple had a daughter together, Lyndsay (born 1988).

Little was engaged to magician Melinda Saxe, but she broke-off the three-year relationship in 1991, saying she had discovered he had secretly videotaped them having sex in 1988. Saxe sued Little for defamation, invasion of privacy, and inflicting emotional distress, claiming he had joked about their relationship on stage. Little claimed the videotaping was consensual. The lawsuit was eventually settled out of court.

He married comedian and impressionist Jeannette Markey in 1994; they divorced in 1997. He was married to Marie Marotta from 2003 until her death in 2010 of a deliberate overdose of sleeping pills after years of suffering from migraines and chronic pain. He married his fourth wife, Catherine Brown, a former reality show contestant, in a private ceremony in 2012; they divorced in October of that year.

In 2010, Little became a naturalized citizen of the United States. Politically, he is a conservative and has described himself as "basically a Republican", though his act has generally been non-partisan. In 2021, he asserted to the Daily Beast his belief that Donald Trump won the 2020 United States presidential election.

Little's older brother, Fred, was a social worker and voice actor who was the original voice of Cederic Sneer in The Raccoons. Fred Little also performed in smaller venues as an impressionist in his own right and appeared on the Tonight Show with Johnny Carson on January 25, 1979, and an episode of An Evening at the Improv in 1990, both times with Rich Little hosting. Younger brother Chris was a commercial artist who designed the covers of Little's albums.
