= CBC Documentary Unit =

Canadian Broadcasting Corporation documentary unit 2000-2015

The CBC Documentary Unit was a division of the Canadian Broadcasting Corporation from 2000 until 2015. The unit focused on documentary production, and was headed by executive producer Mark Starowicz.

Notable productions by the unit include:

- Canada: A People's History
- The Canadian Experience
- The Greatest Canadian
- Hockey: A People's History
- 8th Fire

In June 2014, CBC announced it would close the in-house Documentary Unit, with the last production scheduled for broadcast in the spring of 2015. The decision sparked backlash from several prominent CBC journalists and other Canadian television and radio personalities. In July 2015, executive producer Mark Starowicz announced his departure after overseeing documentary production since 1992.
