= Buchta Dancers =

Canadian dance group

The Buchta Dancers were a troupe of ballroom, folk, and square dancers led by Gunter (1924-1997) and Irma Buchta. They gained fame for their regular performances on the Canadian folk music TV variety show Don Messer's Jubilee.

== Gunter Buchta ==
Gunter Peter Buchta, the founder of the Buchta Dancers, was born in Pelaun, Germany, in 1924. After suffering a leg wound on the Russian front during World War II. He turned to dancing as a form of therapy, which subsequently became his lifelong passion. Gunter and his wife, Irma, immigrated to Canada in 1950. In Canada, he played a significant role in the dance community, including organizing the ballroom dance department at the Maritime Conservatory of Music and founding the Corte Club and the Ballroom Dancing Club of Halifax.

Gunter Buchta's contributions to dance extended beyond his performances. He served as the first head of the ballroom branch of the Canadian Dance Teachers' Association and held a fellowship from the Dance Teachers' Association of Great Britain. He was also a founder of the Canadian Championship for Ballroom Dancing and served as a judge both nationally and internationally.

Gunter Buchta died in Halifax on July 3, 1997.

== The Buchta Dancers ==
The Buchta Dancers are most famously known for their performances on Don Messer's Jubilee, a popular Canadian folk music TV variety show. The Buchta Dancers were regular performers on the show from 1954 to 1971, adding a distinct dance element that complemented the musical performances by Don Messer and His Islanders.
