= List of RPM number-one country singles of 1965 =

These are the Canadian number-one country songs of 1965, per the RPM Country Tracks chart.

Issue date	Title	Artist
January 11	Don't Come Crying	Ron McLeod
January 18	Hitch Hikin’	Dick Damron
January 25	Hitch Hikin’	Dick Damron
February 1	Bitty Baby	Howard Sisters
February 8	Bitty Baby	Howard Sisters
February 15	Bitty Baby	Howard Sisters
February 22	Afraid	Donn Reynolds
March 1	Afraid	Donn Reynolds
March 8	Texas Leather and Mexican Lace	Bob King
March 15	Texas Leather and Mexican Lace	Bob King
March 22	Texas Leather and Mexican Lace	Bob King
March 29	Texas Leather and Mexican Lace	Bob King
April 5	Texas Leather and Mexican Lace	Bob King
April 12	Texas Leather and Mexican Lace	Bob King
April 19	Texas Leather and Mexican Lace	Bob King
April 26	I Wish That I Could Fall	Sandy Selsie
May 3	I Wish That I Could Fall	Sandy Selsie
May 10	Klondike Mike	Hal Willis
May 17	Klondike Mike	Hal Willis
May 24	Klondike Mike	Hal Willis
June 7	Skip, Hop and Wobble	Artie McLearen
June 14	I Wish That I Could Fall	Sandy Selsie
June 21	Can't Live with Him	Myrna Lorrie
June 28	Picking Up My Hat	Debbie Lori Kaye
July 5	Picking Up My Hat	Debbie Lori Kaye
July 12	Picking Up My Hat	Debbie Lori Kaye
July 19	Picking Up My Hat	Debbie Lori Kaye
July 26	Picking Up My Hat	Debbie Lori Kaye
August 2	Picking Up My Hat	Debbie Lori Kaye
August 9	Picking Up My Hat	Debbie Lori Kaye
August 16	Picking Up My Hat	Debbie Lori Kaye
August 23	Picking Up My Hat	Debbie Lori Kaye
August 30	Cathy Keep Playing	Stu Phillips
September 6	Cathy Keep Playing	Stu Phillips
September 13	Cathy Keep Playing	Stu Phillips
September 20	My Good Life	Cy Anders
September 27	My Good Life	Cy Anders
October 4	My Good Life	Cy Anders
October 18	Break the News to Liza	Gary Buck
October 25	Break the News to Liza	Gary Buck
November 1	My Tennessee Baby	Danny Harrison
November 8	My Tennessee Baby	Danny Harrison
November 15	My Tennessee Baby	Danny Harrison
November 22	Marjolaina	Jimmy James
November 29	Marjolaina	Jimmy James
December 6	Marjolaina	Jimmy James
December 13	Marjolaina	Jimmy James
December 20	Marjolaina	Jimmy James
December 27	Marjolaina	Jimmy James

== See also ==
- 1965 in music
