= The Stu Davis Show =

- Genre: Country music
- Presented by: Stu Davis
- Country of origin: Canada
- Original language: English
- No. of seasons: 1

Production
- Production locations: Edmonton, Alberta
- Running time: 15 minutes

Original release
- Network: CBC Television
- Release: 2 April – 25 June 1966

The Stu Davis Show is a Canadian country music television program that aired on CBC Television in 1966.

== Premise ==
Stu Davis (Red River Jamboree, Swing Your Partner, Rope Around the Sun) hosted this Edmonton-produced program with his son, Duane Davis. Series regulars included the band The Pathfinders.

== Scheduling ==
Produced locally in Edmonton, Alberta for four seasons, this 15-minute program was picked up nationally on the CBC network Saturdays at 6:30 p.m. (Eastern) from 2 April to 25 June 1966.
