= Canada: A People's History =

CBC television documentary series

- DVD release of series 1
- Starring: Various
- Narrated by: Maggie Huculak
- Theme music composer: Claude Desjardins and Eric Robertson
- Country of origin: Canada
- Original languages: English, French (original); later dubbed to multiple foreign languages
- No. of episodes: 17

Production
- Executive producer: Mark Starowicz
- Camera setup: Single-camera
- Running time: 120 min/60 min

Original release
- Network: CBC; Radio-Canada
- Release: October 2000 – November 2001

Canada: A People's History is a 17-episode, 32-hour documentary television series on the history of Canada. It first aired on CBC Television from October 2000 to November 2001. The production was an unusually large project for the national network, especially during budget cutbacks. The unexpected success of the series actually led to increased government funding for the CBC. It was also an unusual collaboration with the French arm of the network, which traditionally had autonomous production. The full run of the episodes was produced in English and French. The series title in French was Le Canada: Une histoire populaire. In 2004, OMNI.1 and OMNI.2 began airing multicultural versions, in Chinese, Greek, Hindi, Italian, Polish, Portuguese, and Russian.

The producers intended to make this a dramatic history of the Canadian people; as much as possible, the story was told through the words of the people involved, from great leaders and explorers to everyday people of the land at the time. The documentary makes effective use of visuals, transitions, and dramatic music from or evocative of the eras being covered. In the first season, actors representing historical figures spoke their words, while later seasons used voiceovers over photographic images and film or, when available, original recordings of the subject.

In June 2017, CBC Television aired two new episodes. Part one aired on June 15, with part two on June 22. The series later served as a point of comparison for the CBC's 2017 series Canada: The Story of Us, which was criticized for its handling of French-Canadian and Indigenous history.

== Production ==
The series was conceived by Mark Starowicz and historian Gene Allen. The production team, christened the Canadian History Project and later renamed the CBC Documentary Unit until CBC discontinued in-house documentary production in 2015. Following Canada: A People's History, the team developed and produced such CBC documentary series as The Canadian Experience, The Greatest Canadian, Hockey: A People's History and 2012's acclaimed series about Canada's aboriginal communities, 8th Fire.

It was developed in the wake of the 1995 Quebec referendum at a time of deep cuts to the CBC's budget. The CBC committed about C$25 million to the project.

According to Maclean's production took about three and a half years and involved 15 directors, 7 camera crews, 240 actors and hundreds of historical re-enactors, and the series was the CBC's first joint English–French production. Rather than using expert commentators, the series was said to be built around words written or spoken by historical figures which according to its maker, allowed contributors with differing views to work together on contested subjects. The historians Ramsay Cook, Jean-Claude Robert and Olive Dickason reviewed the scripts for factual accuracy. Digital compositing was used to extend re-enactments and for the Plains of Abraham sequence in "Battle for a Continent", 98 re-enactors were filmed and digitally multiplied into an army of about 9,000. According to Starowicz's account of the production, the French-language network did not fully support this project which complicated the shooting in Quebec and its promotion to French-language audiences.

== Episodes ==
=== Series 1 ===
#	Title	Time span	Topics	Personalities
1	When the World Began...	15,000 BC–1800 AD	First Nations and Inuit history; First European contact	John Cabot; Jacques Cartier; James Cook; Chief Donnacona; Henry Hudson; Maquinna
2	Adventurers and Mystics	1540–1670	European exploration; Hunt for Northwest Passage; Founding of New France; Start of fur trade	Jean de Brébeuf; Étienne Brûlé; Martin Frobisher; Samuel de Champlain; Jean Talon
3	Claiming the Wilderness	1670–1755	Expansion of New France and its fur trade; Conflict with British colonies; Acadian deportation	Louis de Buade de Frontenac; Robert de LaSalle; Charles Lawrence; William Shirley
4	Battle for a Continent	1754–1775	Period around the Seven Years' War; Battle of Louisbourg; Taking of Quebec City at the Plains of Abraham	Guy Carleton; Benjamin Franklin; Louis-Joseph de Montcalm; James Wolfe
5	A Question of Loyalties	1775–1815	The effects of the American Revolution on Canada; Attempted invasion; Loyalist migration; The War of 1812	Benedict Arnold; Joseph Brant; Isaac Brock; Guy Carleton; Richard Montgomery; Charles-Michel de Salaberry; Tecumseh

=== Series 2 ===
#	Title	Time span	Topics	Personalities
6	The Pathfinders	1670–1850	The Northwest is opened by the fur-trading Hudson's Bay Company and North West Company; Explorers and adventurers discover the layout of Canada's interior.	Alexander Mackenzie; Pierre-Esprit Radisson; David Thompson; Pierre Gaultier de Varennes (sieur de La Vérendrye)
7	Rebellion and Reform	1815–1850	Advocates of democracy clash with colonial governors; Bloody rebellions are squashed; The goal of self-government is realized	Robert Baldwin; Joseph Howe; Louis-Hippolyte Lafontaine; John Lambton, 1st Earl of Durham; William Lyon Mackenzie; Louis-Joseph Papineau
8	The Great Enterprise	1850–1867	The story of Confederation; Advocates of nationhood struggle to create a new dominion; The American Civil War rages	George Brown; George-Étienne Cartier; Agnes Macdonald; John A. Macdonald; Harriet Tubman
9	From Sea to Sea	1867–1873	Canada's fledgling dominion tries to spread west; The Red River Rebellion; British Columbia joins Confederation	George-Étienne Cartier; John A. Macdonald; Thomas D'Arcy McGee; Louis Riel

=== Series 3 ===
#	Title	Time span	Topics	Personalities
10	Taking the West	1873–1896	The Macdonald government faces economic trouble; The fate of Riel; The Manitoba Schools Question; The CPR is completed	Big Bear; Crowfoot; John A. Macdonald; Alexander Mackenzie; Louis Riel
11	The Great Transformation	1896–1915	The immigration boom and prairie settlement bring sweeping change; Political movements and intolerances arise; The First World War looms	Robert Borden; Henri Bourassa; Won Alexander Cumyow; Wilfrid Laurier; Guglielmo Marconi; Nellie McClung; John McCrae; Clifford Sifton; J.S. Woodsworth
12	Ordeal by Fire	1915–1929	World War I bears a heavy toll in Europe and at home; Conscription is a divisive issue; Labour unrest follows war's end	Robert Borden; Lionel Groulx; Sam Hughes; Wilfrid Laurier; Nellie McClung; Arthur Meighen
13	Hard Times	1929–1940	The Great Depression and the Dust Bowl bring suffering and crisis; International turmoil leads to the next war	William Aberhart; Richard Bedford Bennett; Maurice Duplessis; Mitchell Hepburn; Adolf Hitler; William Lyon Mackenzie King; Cairine Wilson

=== Series 4 ===
#	Title	Time span	Topics	Personalities
14	The Crucible	1940–1946	The Second World War is Canada's coming of age; Bravery and anguish at home and abroad	Winston Churchill; Tommy Douglas; Adolf Hitler; William Lyon Mackenzie King; Andrew McNaughton; Franklin Delano Roosevelt
15	Comfort and Fear	1946–1964	The baby boom and the age of television bring prosperity; The Cold War looms large	John Diefenbaker; Tommy Douglas; Maurice Duplessis; René Lévesque; Lester Pearson; Joey Smallwood; Louis St. Laurent
16	Years of Hope and Anger	1964–1976	The 60s and 70s bring change; The Quiet Revolution; EXPO 67; A new flag; The FLQ crisis; The rise of Trudeau.	Doris Anderson; Robert Bourassa; Jean Lesage; René Lévesque; Patrick Moore; Lester Pearson; Pierre Trudeau
17	In an Uncertain World	1976–1990	Economic and political uncertainty rise; The 1980 Quebec referendum; Constitutional reforms are followed by the dawn of free trade.	Robert Bourassa; Jean Chrétien; René Lévesque; Peter Lougheed; Brian Mulroney; Pierre Trudeau; John Turner

=== 2017 Series ===
#	Title	Time span	Topics	Personalities
18(1)	New Times New Ways, Part 1	1991–2001	"Gays and lesbians achieve equality; Indigenous people seek redress over past abuse; the country once again stands on the brink of breakup; Cirque du Soleil conquers the world; a way of life ends in Newfoundland; the BlackBerry gives birth to Canada's own Silicon Valley; Canada's peacekeeping role suffers a near-fatal blow; and the 9/11 attack makes a small-town in Newfoundland heroic."	
18(2)	New Times New Ways, Part 2	2001–2015	"Canada fights terrorism in Afghanistan and pays a heavy price; the Muslim community is under suspicion and makes innocent victims; Indigenous women are Idle No More; Canadian athletes own the podium at the Olympics in Vancouver; security goes rogue when the G20 meet in Toronto; the Earth's climate is in jeopardy; and a Canadian astronaut sees its frailty."	

== Reception ==
According to the Museum of Broadcast Communications, the series was broadcast on Sunday nights and re-broadcast on CBC Newsworld. More than half of Canadians approx. 15 million people watched all or part of the first nine episodes with an average audience of about 2.2 million per episode. The production was also widely used in schools and the CBC has said that its video and DVD editions were present in 80% of Canadian classrooms.

The series was released during a period of public debate over how Canadian history should be taught and told. Maclean's noted disagreements between traditional historians who emphasized political and military history and social historians who focused on Indigenous peoples, women, immigrants and the poor, and described the series as certain to become a point of contention. Starowicz said that the producers fielded rumours in Quebec that the CBC budget hid federal national-unity funding and that some outsiders asked the production to downplay or emphasize particular events. He said the series was made under the CBC's journalistic policy and had to be as defensible as the fifth estate. Choosing what to include or leave out was a recurring issue, for example, Laura Secord was not featured. The MBC encyclopedia notes that questions of historical accuracy and viewed through the lens of an inclusive "people's history", dominated academic and press discussion of the series.

In a 2003 review of Starowicz's book on the series by the Institute for Research on Public Policy said that the series' main achievement was interesting millions of Canadians in their past.

== Companion materials ==
The series was accompanied by a two-volume companion book set which were published in English by McClelland & Stewart and in French by Fides, along with a bilingual website, educational videos and teacher guides. The soundtrack was also released on CD and the book set became a bestseller. Starowicz later wrote Making History: The Remarkable Story Behind Canada: A People's History, an account of the production which was published by McClelland & Stewart.

== Awards ==
In 2001, Season One of Canada: A People's History was awarded three Gemini Awards by the Academy of Canadian Cinema and Television:

- Best Documentary Series
- Best Sound in an Information or Documentary Series or Program
- Best Original Score

The series was also recognized by the Columbus International Film and Video Festival in 2001 with a CHRIS Award in Humanities category for Best Series as well as recognition for Best Episode and Best print press/marketing materials.

The extensive bilingual website created to support and enhance the series was recognized with two awards at the 2001 Baddeck International New Media Festival: one for Best Education / Information / Training Web Site and Best Technical Achievement.

Canada's History Society awarded the series and its executive producer Mark Starowicz its Governor General's History Award for Popular Media: Pierre Berton Award in 2001.

== See also ==
- Canada's Story
- Events of National Historic Significance
- Heritage Minutes
- Hinterland Who's Who
- National Historic Sites of Canada
- Persons of National Historic Significance
- The Greatest Canadian
