= Hockey: A People's History =

2006 Canadian television documentary series

- Country of origin: Canada
- No. of episodes: 10

Production
- Running time: 60 minutes

Original release
- Network: CBC
- Release: 28 July – 27 October 2006

Hockey: A People's History is a television documentary series from the CBC's Documentary Unit. It premiered on September 17, 2006. It aired on Sunday nights, in two-episode blocks, on CBC Television; repeats were made later in the week on CBC Newsworld.

Much like previous series Canada: A People's History, the series told the history of the sport of ice hockey from a personal perspective, giving voice to various individuals, major and minor, as the sport grows and evolves in Canada. The series ran for 10 hours in total, and was shot in HD. Episode narration was by actor Paul Gross.

== Episodes ==
1. "A Simple Game"
2. "The Money Game"
3. "Empires on Ice"
4. "The People's Game"
5. "A National Obsession"
6. "The Golden Age"
7. "Soul of a Nation"
8. "Hope and Betrayal"
9. "Winter of Discontent"
10. "Reclaiming the Game"

== Other media ==
Warner Bros. and CBC Home Media have released a 6-Disc DVD collection. The collection features two episodes per disc as well as bonus features on the 6th disc.

McClelland & Stewart has released a print version of Hockey: A People's History by Michael McKinley as well as an updated version with additional final chapter.
