= Canadian Country Music Hall of Fame =

The Canadian Country Music Hall of Fame honours Canadian country music artists, builders, or broadcasters, living or deceased. The artifact collection includes extensive biographical information on the inductees. The Canadian Music Hall of Fame is on level five of Studio Bell in Calgary (850 4 Street SE), Alberta, a floor entirely dedicated to celebrating and recognizing Canadian music creators and artists who have left their mark on the country and beyond.

In 2009, Cantos Music Foundation (now the National Music Centre) in Calgary became the owner of the Canadian Country Music Hall of Fame's artifacts after a transfer of ownership from Deb Buck, wife of deceased Hall of Fame member Gary Buck. For several years the Hall of Fame was based in a log building on the Calgary Stampede grounds. In 1993, Canadian singer-songwriter Stompin' Tom Connors declined an induction into the Hall of Fame, as part of his ongoing campaign against the Americanization of Canadian music.

== Inductees ==
1984

- Wilf Carter (artist)
- Tommy Hunter (artist)
- Orval Prophet (artist)
- William Harold Moon (builder)

1985

- Don Messer (artist)
- Hank Snow (artist)

1986

- Papa Joe Brown (artist)

1987

- Lucille Starr (artist)

1988

- Jack Feeney (builder)

1989

- Charlie Chamberlain (artist)
- Al Cherney (artist)
- King Ganam (artist)
- Dallas Harms (artist)
- Earl Heywood (artist)
- Marg Osburne (artist)
- Ian Tyson (artist)
- Mercey Brothers (artist)
- Maurice Bolyer (artist / builder)
- Don Grashey (builder)

1990

- Gordie Tapp (artist)
- Ron Sparling (builder)

1991

- Rhythm Pals (artist)
- A. Hugh Joseph (builder)

1992

- Carroll Baker (artist)
- Gordon Burnett (builder)

1993

- Ward Allen (artist)
- Stu Phillips (artist)
- Bob Nolan (artist)
- Stu Davis (artist)
- Ted Daigle (builder)
- Frank Jones (builder)

1994

- Dick Damron (artist)
- Hank Smith (builder)

1995

- Gene MacLellan (artist)
- Stan Klees (builder)

1996

- Myrna Lorrie (artist)
- Larry Delaney (builder)

1997

- Family Brown (artist)
- Sam Sniderman (builder)

1998

- Ray Griff (artist)
- Bill Anderson (builder)

1999

- Ronnie Prophet (artist)
- Walt Grealis (builder)

2000

- Colleen Peterson (artist)
- Leonard Rambeau (builder)

2001

- Gordon Lightfoot (artist)
- Gary Buck (builder)

2002

- Anne Murray (artist)
- Art Snider (builder)
- Bev Munro (broadcaster)
- D'Arcy Scott (broadcaster)
- Elmer Tippe (broadcaster)

2003

- Sylvia Tyson (artist)
- J. Edward Preston (builder)
- Fred King (broadcaster)
- Charlie Russell (broadcaster)
- Art Wallman (broadcaster)

2004

- The Good Brothers (artist)
- "Weird" Harold Kendall (broadcaster)

2005

- Gary Fjellgaard (artist)
- R. Harlan Smith (builder)
- Paul Kennedy (broadcaster)

2006

- Terry Carisse (artist)
- Brian Ahern (builder)
- Curley Gurlock (broadcaster)

2007

- John Allan Cameron (artist)
- Sheila Hamilton (builder)
- Cliff Dumas (broadcaster)

2008

- Prairie Oyster (artist)
- Brian Ferriman (builder)
- Wes Montgomery (broadcaster)

2009

- Buffy Sainte-Marie (artist)
- Barry Haugen (builder)
- John Murphy (broadcaster)

2010

- Willie P. Bennett (artist)
- Marie Bottrell (artist)
- Donna Anderson & LeRoy Anderson (artist)
- Eddie Eastman (artist)
- Don Harron (artist)
- Fred McKenna (artist)
- Wayne Rostad (artist)
- Joyce Smith (artist)
- Hal & Ginger Willis (artist)
- Ray St. Germain (artist)
- Tom Tompkins (builder)

2011

- Michelle Wright (artist)
- Bill Langstroth (builder)

2012

- Johnny Burke (artist)
- Ralph Murphy (builder)

2013

- Rita MacNeil (artist)
- Ed Harris (builder)

2014

- Wendell Ferguson (artist)
- Ron Sakamoto (builder)

2015

- Dianne Leigh (artist)
- Elizabeth "Ma" Henning (builder)

2016

- Murray McLauchlan (artist)
- Paul Mascioli (builder)

2017

- Paul Brandt (artist)
- L. Harvey Gold (builder)

2018

- Terri Clark (artist)
- Jackie Rae Greening (builder)

2019

- Charlie Major (artist)
- Anya Wilson (builder)

2021

- Patricia Conroy (artist)
- Randy Stark (builder)

2022

- George Fox (artist)
- Randall Prescott (builder)

2023

- Jason McCoy (artist)
- Brian Edwards (builder)

2024

- K.d. Lang (artist)
- Gilles Godard (builder)

2025

- Lisa Brokop (artist)
- Joe Wood (builder)

2026

- The Wilkinsons (artist)
- Ron Kitchener (builder)

== See also ==
- Canadian Country Music Association
- CMT (Canada)
- List of music museums
