= Johnny Burke (Canadian singer) =

Canadian country singer

Background information
- Born: Jean Paul Bourque; April 28, 1940; Rosaireville, New Brunswick, Canada
- Died: September 21, 2017 (aged 77) Cobourg, Ontario
- Genres: Country
- Spouse(s): Teresa Burke Marlene Burke 3 children Donald, Dennis and John

Johnny Burke (April 28, 1940 – August 21, 2017) was a Canadian country singer who recorded a series of singles with Acclaim Records in the 1980s. He released his debut single in 1966, and his 1967 single "I Can't Even Do Wrong Right" reached number-one on the RPM Country Tracks chart.

== Life and career ==
Burke was born Jean Paul Bourque on April 28, 1940, in Rosaireville, New Brunswick. His family was Francophone and of Acadian descent, and he had 12 siblings. In the early 1960s, Burke moved to Toronto, where he began his music career, under the name Johnny Burke. In 1966, Burke released his debut and second single with Columbia Records. The following year, he released two more singles with Columbia, including "I Can't Even Do Wrong Right," which hit number-one on the RPM Country Tracks chart. Burke hosted At The Caribou, a syndicated show, along with the Caribou Showband, which he established in 1967. and later renamed to Eastwind in 1972. Burke recorded two 1970 singles "Whiskey For Breakfast" and "Kingdom Of My Mind" with the label Caribou Records. "Kingdom Of My Mind" peaked at #40 on the RPM Country Tracks chart.

In 2005, Burke was inducted into the New Brunswick Country Music Hall of Fame. In 2012, Burke was inducted into the Canadian Country Music Hall of Fame.

On the evening of September 21, 2017, Burke died from esophageal cancer at the age of 77.
