= Mark Starowicz =

Canadian journalist and producer

- Born: September 8, 1946 (age 79); Worksop, England
- Occupation(s): journalist and radio and TV producer
- Awards: Order of Canada; Order of Ontario

Mark Starowicz, OC OOnt (/ˈstɑːrəwɪts/ STAR-ə-wits; born September 8, 1946) is a Canadian journalist and producer.

Born in Worksop, England, the son of Polish émigrés, he and his family immigrated to Montreal in 1954. He attended Loyola High School and received a B.A. from McGill University in 1968. In 1964, he started as a reporter for the Montreal Gazette. He moved to the McGill Daily in 1968 and to the Toronto Star in 1969.

From 1970 to 1979, he was a producer for CBC Radio and was responsible for revamping As It Happens and creating Sunday Morning.

From 1982 to 1992, he was the executive producer of the CBC Television newsmagazine program, The Journal. From 1992 to 2015, he was an executive documentary producer for the CBC. He was the executive producer of the 2000 mini-series, Canada: A People's History, and served as head of the CBC Documentary Unit. In 2004, McClelland & Stewart published his book, Making History: The Remarkable Story Behind Canada: A People's History (ISBN 978-0-7710-8262-7), about his experiences.

After overseeing documentary production at the CBC since 1992, Starowicz announced he would leave the organization in July 2015. He planned to launch his own independent production company, Grand Passage Media, which will specialize in documentaries.

== Honours ==
He was made an Officer of the Order of Canada in 2004 for having "demonstrated and shared his pride in" Canada. In 2006, he was made a member of the Order of Ontario in recognition for having been "responsible for some of the most influential news programs in Canada". Starowicz received the Governor General's Performing Arts Award for his lifetime contribution to Canadian broadcasting. In 2001, he was awarded an honorary Doctor of Letters degree from York University.

In 2015, he received the Gordon Sinclair Award, the lifetime achievement award for Canadian broadcast journalism from the Academy of Canadian Cinema and Television.
