= Don Messer's Jubilee =

Canadian folk music TV variety show

- Genre: Music variety
- Starring: Don Messer; Charlie Chamberlain; Marg Osburne
- Opening theme: "Goin' to the Barndance Tonight"
- Ending theme: "Till We Meet Again"
- Country of origin: Canada
- Original language: English

Original release
- Network: CBC (1957–1969) syndicated (1969–1973)
- Release: 7 November 1957 – 1973

Don Messer's Jubilee is a Canadian folk musical variety show first broadcast on radio and later on television. The radio version aired from produced from 1939 to 1958 in Charlottetown for CBC Radio. The Television version show shot at the studios of CBHT in Halifax, Nova Scotia, Canada. It was broadcast by CBC Television nationwide from 1957 until 1969, after almost two decades in various formats on CBC radio.

Taking its name from band leader and fiddler Don Messer, the half-hour weekly program featured Messer and his band "Don Messer and His Islanders", as well as a guest performer. The show followed a consistent format throughout its years, beginning with a tune named "Goin' to the Barndance Tonight", followed by fiddle tunes by Messer, songs from some of his "Islanders" including singers Marg Osburne and Charlie Chamberlain, numbers by the Buchta Dancers, the featured guest performance, and a closing hymn. It ended with "Till We Meet Again".

The series began 7 November 1957 as a regional program limited to CBC's Nova Scotia and New Brunswick stations. On 7 August 1959, CBC stations throughout Canada carried the show as a summer replacement for Country Hoedown's Friday evening time slot. That fall, Don Messer's Jubilee became a regular season CBC series as of 28 September 1959, becoming a Monday night fixture until its final 1968-1969 season when it returned to the Friday evening timeslot.

Outside of Hockey Night In Canada, in the mid-1960s Don Messer's Jubilee was the #1 show in the country, earning higher ratings than even the imported CBS variety show, The Ed Sullivan Show. The guest performance slot gave national exposure to numerous Canadian folk musicians, including Stompin' Tom Connors, Catherine McKinnon, Anne Murray, Gordon Lightfoot, Gene MacLellan, Fred McKenna, and Canadian singer Bud Spencer.

The cancellation of the show by the public broadcaster in 1969 caused a nationwide protest, including the raising of questions by Members of Parliament in the House of Commons. The last CBC broadcast was on 20 June 1969. Independent TV station CHCH-TV in Hamilton, Ontario, picked up the show for about four years. It was distributed to stations throughout Canada in syndication. The show ended following Messer's death in 1973.

== See also ==
- Singalong Jubilee, another musical series produced at CBC Halifax at the same time as Don Messer's program, and which featured many of the same performers.
- The Pig and Whistle, CTV's highly rated variety programme
- Folk Songs With Ed McCurdy, a short-lived (1961 only) folk music show on CBC TV
