= Red River Jamboree =

- Genre: Country music
- Presented by: Stu Davis (1960); Stu Phillips (1960–1964); Reg Gibson (1965)
- Country of origin: Canada
- Original language: English
- No. of seasons: 5

Production
- Producer: Perry Rosemond

Original release
- Network: CBC Television
- Release: 8 July 1960 – 23 June 1965

Red River Jamboree is a Canadian country music television program which aired on CBC Television from 1960 to 1965.

== Premise ==
This Winnipeg-produced program was initially broadcast as a local production. In June 1965, it was carried nationally on CBC to fill in the time slot between seasons of Country Hoedown.

Episodes were dedicated to a particular western theme such as fur trading, homesteading, how Saturday nights are observed, and the demise of buffalo herds. Music was combined with stories and segments such as film of a historic ranch.

Stu Davis initially hosted Red River Jamboree during the first national broadcasts. Country musician Stu Phillips became host in October 1960 when the series was renewed for its first complete season. Reg Gibson hosted the final episodes of the series after Phillips left for an American-syndicated program, Country A Go Go. Featured artists included the Selkirk Settlers band, the Altones quartet, and dance troupe Valley Beaux and Belles.

== Scheduling ==
This half-hour program was broadcast throughout the CBC network from 1960 to 1965 as follows:

Day	Time	Season run
Fridays	8:30 p.m.	8 July to 24 September 1960
Saturdays	7:30 p.m.	1 October 1960 to 24 June 1961
Fridays	8:00 p.m.	7 July to 23 September 1961
Saturdays	8:30 p.m.	30 September 1961 to 30 June 1962
Fridays	8:00 p.m.	6 July to 21 September 1962
Saturdays	8:30 p.m.	from 29 September 1962
Wednesdays	8:00 p.m.	25 September 1963 to 24 June 1964
Wednesdays	8:00 p.m.	23 September 1964 to 23 June 1965

== See also ==
- Red River Colony
