= Juvenile Diabetes Cure Alliance =

Juvenile Diabetes Cure Alliance (JDCA)
- Type: 501(c)(3) Nonprofit Organization
- Founded: in 2010 in New York City, New York, U.S.
- Founder: Brian Kelly
- Area served: North America
- Website: thejdca.org

The Juvenile Diabetes Cure Alliance (JDCA) is a registered 501(c)(3) non-profit organization dedicated to developing a Practical Cure for type 1 diabetes. The organization advocates for increasing type 1 diabetes cure research and publishes reports on a variety of related topics, including research progress, fundraising utilization, and donor priorities. Established in 2010, the organization’s home office is in New York City and it focuses primarily on activity within the United States.

Activities include research, publishing, and advocating for T1D donors. All activities serve the nonprofit's ultimate purpose of bringing about what the organization calls a "Practical Cure" for type 1 diabetes.

The organization defines a Practical Cure as any solution that gives people living with the disease the chance to live a normal, unrestricted life. The clinical requirements of a Practical Cure are defined by those living with T1D who understand the daily burden. Practical Cure requirements include testing blood sugars once a week or less, eating an unrestricted diet, a greatly reduced and simple regimen of medication, sleeping worry-free, experiencing minimal to no diabetes side effects, and experiencing fast recovery from surgeries.

== History ==
The JDCA was founded in 2010 by Brian Kelly, former Chairman of the Board of Activision Blizzard, after his son was diagnosed with type 1 diabetes at the age of two. Kelly founded the organization to accelerate a cure for type 1 diabetes within his son’s lifetime. At the time of its founding, the JDCA adopted a business, results-focused perspective in an effort to hold major diabetes fundraising nonprofit organizations accountable for the absence of measurable progress tracking and a lack of transparency to the donor public.

== Operations ==
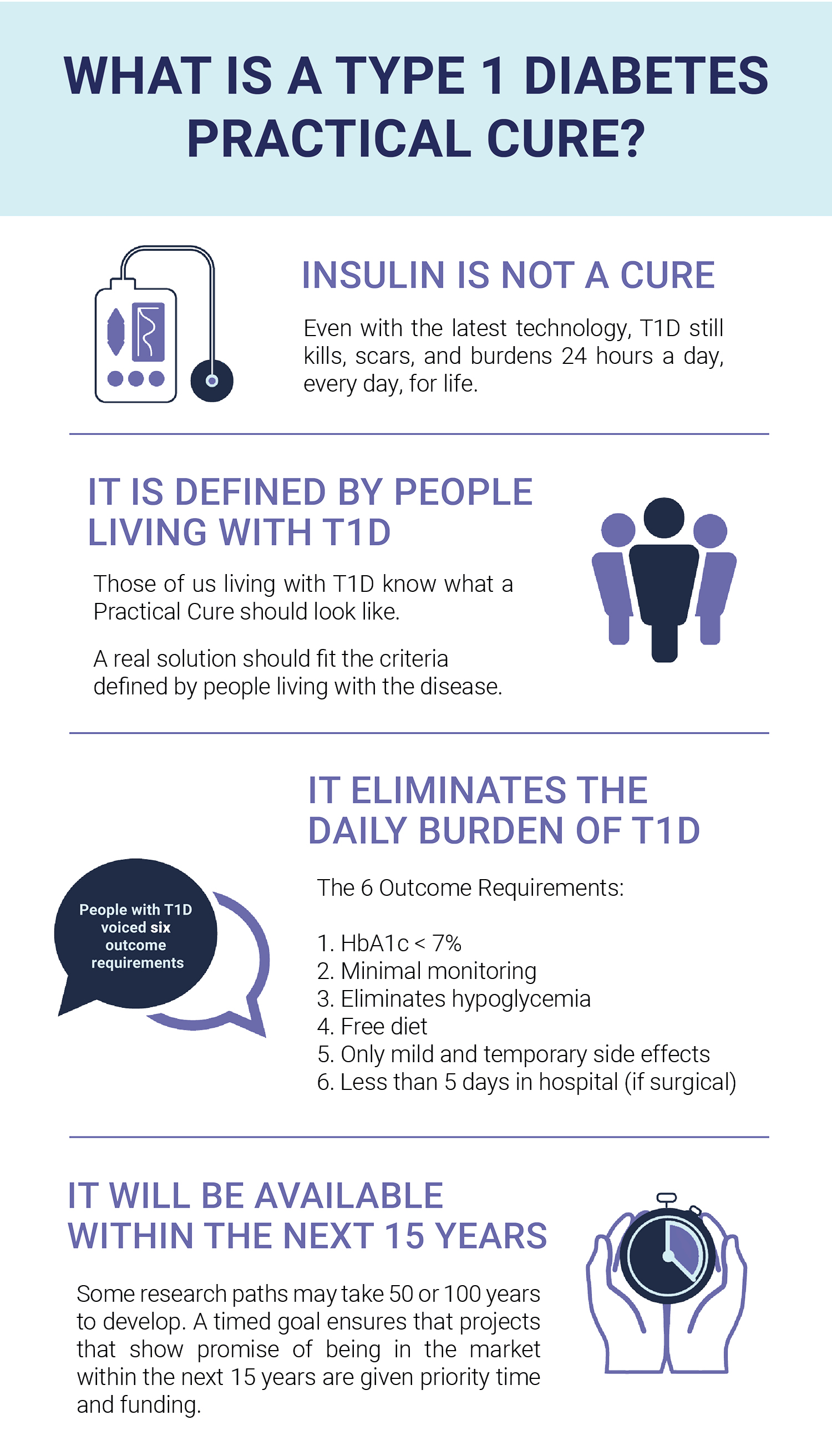
Practical cure definition

Between 30 and 40 reports are published per year on the Juvenile Diabetes Cure Alliance website and sent via email. All reports are free to the public to increase awareness and access to information regarding current developments in the T1D research ecosystem.

The JDCA tracks and categorizes type 1 diabetes potential Practical Cure research projects that are in human trials or about to start human trials. The list of projects is updated twice a year. While most projects have remained constant, some have been removed over time for insufficient test results and new ones have been added.

The State of the Cure for Type 1 Diabetes (SOTC) provides an annual overview of progress toward a T1D cure throughout the year. SOTC reflects on the challenges, advancements, and steps needed to move forward with finding a Practical Cure.

The organization evaluates the publicly available financial documents of major diabetes charities and publishes reports on how funds are utilized. Topics covered include research grant allocation, research funding priorities, CEO compensation, and analyzing cure-based marketing versus cure-based funding. The purpose is to foster transparency, bring attention to discrepancies in research funding, and provide recommendations to larger, influential nonprofits to improve donor loyalty and expedite research progress. Breakthrough T1D and the American Diabetes Association are the common focus of this reporting.

The organization also believes that nonprofit executive pay should be primarily incentive-based; tied to both organizational advancements and tangible progress toward a T1D cure and treatment.

The JDCA publishes multiple annual reports that detail the sentiments of the T1D community, specifically regarding priorities and values. According to the JDCA, a consistent finding is that the number one priority of the T1D donor community is developing a cure for type 1 diabetes. According to annual community surveys, 97% of T1D donors say that the number one reason they donate is to fund cure research.

The JDCA advocates for a significant increase in spending on cure research for type 1 diabetes through annual petitions. Its activities have fostered some discussion within the diabetes community. The 2023 9th Annual More for a T1D Cure petition to increase cure funding acquired 388,000 signatures.

== Criticism ==
The JDCA’s approach has been controversial for its focus on outcomes and expediency rather than traditional methods of deciding what projects to fund. Critics of the JDCA have stated that the definition of a cure can vary. Others argue that a cure by 2035 is unattainable and that improved diabetes treatments are a more valid outlet for funding than the JDCA acknowledges.
