= The Canadian Experience =

Television documentary series

The Canadian Experience is a television documentary series shown on CBC Television. Each one-hour episode present a significant event or story from Canadian history. The first episode aired on January 22, 2004. The series is produced by the CBC Documentary Unit, the same team behind Canada: A People's History.

== Episodes ==
1. "The Queen and the Skipper: The Story of The Bluenose" - The history of the famous racing schooner
2. "Talking Canadian" - A look at distinctly Canadian English words and modes of speech
3. "The Underground Railroad: Flight to Freedom" - The Canadian role up to and during the American Civil War
4. "Year of the Hunter" - The making of Nanook of the North, the first true documentary film
5. "Expo 67: Back to the Future" - The success of the World's Fair in Montreal, and its effect on Canada
6. "Sisters in the Wilderness" - The story of Susanna Moodie and her sister Catharine Parr Traill, writers in early-19th-century Upper Canada. two-hour episode

=== Specials ===
- "The 13th Mission" - The story of a World War II Lancaster bomber, including the women who built it and the men who flew it, in the context of the war era. First aired June 6, 2004, the 60th anniversary of D-Day.
- "The Liberation of Holland" - The story of the Canadian First Army's task to liberate the Netherlands, and particularly the grueling Battle of the Scheldt in the autumn of 1944. First aired May 2005, near the 60th anniversary of VE Day.
