= Charlie Chamberlain =

Canadian singer

- Also known as: The Singing Lumberjack
- Born: July 14, 1911; Bathurst, New Brunswick, Canada
- Died: July 16, 1972
- Genres: Country, folk
- Occupation: Vocalist
- Instrument: Vocals
- Labels: Apex Records, Point Records, Rodeo Records
- Formerly of: Don Messer, Marg Osburne

Charlie Chamberlain (14 July 1911 in Bathurst, New Brunswick, Canada – 16 July 1972) was a featured entertainer on Don Messer's Jubilee, which ran from 1957 through 1969 on CBC Television.

He died in Bathurst, New Brunswick, the town where he was born, only two days after his 61st birthday. At the time, he had been appearing with Don Messer on independent TV station CHCH-TV in Hamilton, Ontario, who picked up the show for some four years after it was cancelled by the CBC in 1969.

== Life ==
Chamberlain's mother became a widow early on, and to support her around the home, he began working in the lumber woods at the age of eight. Despite his young age, he was an extroverted individual, eager to entertain in that environment.During WWI, he allegedly sang to the soldiers on passing trains. While riding a train himself, a friend of Don Messer's heard Charlie singing, and put him in touch with the fiddler who was looking for a vocalist. Charlie Chamberlain performed pretty much exclusively with Messer for the rest of his career.

Chamberlain is most often recalled as an incredible character, a huge man with huge appetites, who was notoriously generous, and quite freely shared his money with friends and neighbours. During the sixties, when Don Messer's Jubilee was one of the highest rated TV shows in Canada, Charlie also worked pumping gas at a service station in Lakeside, NS.

== Career ==
Chamberlain was known as Messer's "Singing Lumberjack," and his vocal work is featured on many of the albums released by Don Messer and His Islanders. Chamberlain is remembered as a showstopper, famed for his signature bowler hat and shillelagh.

== Discography ==
=== Solo records ===
- Charlie Chamberlain Sings Irish Songs, Apex, AL1619
- With My Shillelagh Under My Arm (LP), Point Records, P-319

=== Collaborations with Marg Osburne ===
- By Request Favorite Sacred Songs with Marg Osburne And Charlie Chamberlain, Rodeo Records, with Marg Osburne.
- They Never Grow Old, Point Records, P-318 MG-251-252, 1967.
- Favorite Sacred Songs. 1970. Rodeo RO6M-1267
- Beyond the Sunset. 196?. Point Records
- They Never Grow Old. 1973. MCA Coral
- He: Songs Of Reverence: Volume 2. 196?. Apex
- Best of Marg and Charlie. 1973. MCA Coral, CBT 35006

== Awards ==
- Inducted into the Canadian Country Music Hall of Fame in 1989.
- Recipient (posthumously) of the ECMA Stompin' Tom Connors Award.
