= Canada's Story =

- Genre: Historical documentary
- Country of origin: Canada
- Original language: English
- No. of seasons: 1
- No. of episodes: 20

Production
- Running time: 60 minutes
- Production company: National Film Board of Canada

Original release
- Network: CBC Television
- Release: 5 September – 30 September 1966

Canada's Story is a Canadian historical documentary television series that aired on CBC Television in 1966.

== Premise ==
This 20-part series Canadian history was produced by the National Film Board of Canada (NFB). Most episodes were compiled from previous film series such as The Struggle for Self-Government (1961), Prelude to Confederation (1962) and Explorers (1964) and generally grouped under the overall NFB title The History Makers. The overall time line of the series covered the past four centuries.

Episodes included dramatic portrayals of historic figures such as Henry Hudson (Powys Thomas), Sir John A. Macdonald (Robert Christie), Alexander Mackenzie (Don Francks) and David Thompson (James Douglas). Numerous producers and directors created the films.

== Scheduling ==
This hour-long series was broadcast weekdays at 4:00 p.m. (Eastern) from 5 to 30 September 1966.

== See also ==
- Canada: A People's History
- Events of National Historic Significance
- Heritage Minutes
- National Historic Sites of Canada
- Persons of National Historic Significance
- The Greatest Canadian
