= Country Hoedown =

Canadian country music television series

- Genre: Country music
- Country of origin: Canada
- Original language: English
- No. of seasons: 10

Production
- Producer: Dave Thomas
- Running time: 30 minutes

Original release
- Network: CBC Television
- Release: 30 June 1956 – 25 June 1965

Country Hoedown is a Canadian country music television series that aired on CBC Television from 1956 to 1965.

== Premise ==
Gordie Tapp hosted the series and also performed in sketches portraying characters such as Cousin Clem which he later reprised for Hee Haw.

King Ganam and his band, the Sons of the West, were featured from the initial years of the series. Ganam's band included Tommy Hunter who later starred in his own CBC series.

Performers frequently seen on the series included Al Cherney, Tommy Common, Johnny Davidson, Mary Frances, Pat Hervey, and Wally Traugot. Lorraine Foreman and the Hames Sisters came from the Pick the Stars series. Gordon Lightfoot was at one point a member of the Singin' Swingin' Eight, the programme's square dance singing ensemble. The Country Hoedown orchestra was led by Lloyd Cooper.

Episodes began with the song "Come Right In. It's Country Hoedown time", then Tapp's welcome message, "Hi there, friends and neighbours." The concluding song, featuring the whole cast, was "Love is the Only Thing".

== Production ==
The programme's set consisted of a barn setting on a stage.

== Scheduling and reception ==
Country Hoedown aired on Saturdays at 9:00 p.m. as a mid-year substitute for On Camera in 1956. From 28 September 1956, it aired Fridays at 9:30 p.m. as a regular season programme until July 1959. From October 1959, it was rescheduled to 8:00 p.m., still on Fridays, until its final episode was broadcast on 25 June 1965.

International Surveys television ratings in 1960 and 1961 indicated that Country Hoedown and Don Messer's Jubilee were most popular among rural viewers, and among viewers outside British Columbia, Ontario, and Quebec. Other surveys indicated that the show received higher approval than for the other Toronto-produced CBC variety productions. However, its popularity deteriorated by the mid-1960s despite improvements to the sketch content and the sets. Country Hoedown was later succeeded by the relatively flashy The Tommy Hunter Show.
