= Don Messer =

- Messer in 1941

Background information
- Born: Donald Charles Frederick Messer; May 9, 1909; Tweedside, New Brunswick, Canada
- Died: March 26, 1973 (aged 63) Halifax, Nova Scotia, Canada
- Genres: Folk
- Occupation: Fiddler
- Instrument: Violin

Donald Charles Frederick Messer (May 9, 1909 – March 26, 1973) was a Canadian musician, band leader, radio broadcaster, and defining icon of folk music during the 1960s. His CBC Television series Don Messer’s Jubilee (1959–69) featured Messer's down-east fiddle style and the "old-time" music of Don Messer and His Islanders, and was one of the most popular and enduring Canadian television programs of the 1960s. Messer was known as a shy fiddler, who preferred to have the other members of the band take the spotlight.

== Life ==
Born in Tweedside, New Brunswick, Messer was the youngest of 11 children to John and Margaret Agnes (Moffitt) Messer. He began playing the violin at age five, learning fiddle tunes with Irish and Scottish influences. By the age of seven he was playing fiddle for square dances. As a young boy, Messer would play concerts in the local area and later throughout southwestern New Brunswick.

By the time he was a young man he had amassed a repertoire of hundreds of reels, jigs, breakdowns, and other pieces for fiddle. He was playing endless square dances, country dances, weddings, and other parties. At age 16 he moved to Boston, Massachusetts, where he received his only formal instruction in music. He moved back to New Brunswick in March 1929.

He died of a heart attack in 1973 in Halifax, Nova Scotia. A monument was erected in his memory in Tweedside, New Brunswick. A fiddle also stands in Harvey, New Brunswick as a monument.

== Career ==
=== Radio ===
Messer began his radio career on CFBO in Saint John, New Brunswick in 1929 when he joined the station staff. He had organized a small studio band of musicians by that point and in 1934, they began a regular radio show for the Canadian Radio Broadcasting Commission (forerunner to the Canadian Broadcasting Corporation or CBC), broadcasting from CHSJ in Saint John under the name the New Brunswick Lumberjacks. Messer also began to make personal appearances throughout the Maritimes and New England using a smaller group named the "Backwoods Breakdown." Messer left Saint John in 1939 and moved to Charlottetown, Prince Edward Island where he joined CFCY as music director.

=== Don Messer and His Islanders ===
While in Charlottetown, Messer formed the "Islanders" and by 1944 the group was airing a show nationally on CBC radio. The show established itself as the most popular on Canadian radio during the 1940s-1960s and Don Messer and The Islanders began to tour outside of the Maritimes. It was formed around two of the original members, lumberjack-vocalist Charlie Chamberlain from Bathurst, N.B., and bass player Julius (Duke) Neilson from Woodstock, N.B. Other members were added throughout the years and Don Messer and the Islanders was later changed to Don Messer and His Islanders. The band remained together after the late 1930s. The musicians provided a backdrop for vocalists, guest performers and, after 1959, the Buchta Dancers. Charlie Chamberlain and Marg Osburne were the lead vocalists.

=== Television ===
In 1956, Messer's music group began to make regular television appearances on CBHT-TV in Halifax, Nova Scotia. CBC television began a summer series called The Don Messer Show on August 7, 1959, which continued into the fall as Don Messer's Jubilee, produced out of Halifax. Continuing as Don Messer's Jubilee throughout the 1960s, the show won a wide audience and reportedly became the second-most watched television show in Canada during the decade (next to Hockey Night in Canada). The show was notable because it had a regular guest performer time slot, giving rise to many important Canadian folk singers through their national exposure, including Stompin' Tom Connors and Catherine McKinnon, and fiddler Graham Townsend among many others including a young 10 year old fiddler named Jim Elliott.

Don Messer's Jubilee was cancelled by CBC television in April 1969, raising a national protest among viewers and fans and even raising questions from the floor of the House of Commons. At the time the show was dropped, it still rated in the top 10 and the network was not specific about its reasons for dropping the show. The audience protest came particularly from the Maritimes and from thousands of Maritimers living in other parts of Canada, including former Prime Minister John Diefenbaker, who was a fan of the show. Messer and his band continued Don Messer's Jubilee in syndication on CHCH-TV in Hamilton, Ontario following the 1969 CBC cancellation until Messer's death four years later.

== Legacy ==
Messer's television show became the subject of the National Film Board feature Don Messer: His Land and His Music in 1971 and CBC produced a commemorative video of the show in 1985.

Messer died in Halifax and his library and papers are held by the Public Archives of Nova Scotia. One of his fiddles is now located at the Country Music Hall of Fame in Nashville, Tennessee, although he always claimed that his folk music was neither country, nor western - the Irish and Scottish-influenced fiddle tunes having pre-dated the country/western genre by several hundred years.

Don Messer's estate, which is run by his daughter Dawn Attis, has attempted to protect his name and image and his music. The estate gave sole license to contemporary Canadian folk musician Frank Leahy, who also owns and performs with one of Messer's fiddles. He received the honorary violin in 1997. Leahy recorded a tribute on Don Messer for the CBC and created a full-length stage production on "Don Messer's Violin," which was presented across Canada. In the production, the role of Messer vocalist Marg Osborne was played by Catherine McKinnon and Leahy played the role of Messer.

A fiddle purchased by Messer in 1930 for $150 sold at an auction on July 23, 2006 for $11,750 to a resident of St. Stephen, New Brunswick. The fiddle was a copy of an instrument made by luthier Antonio Stradivari from the late 1600s. Messer owned 14 fiddles in his lifetime.

A plaque to recognize the former home of Don Messer was installed by the City of Charlottetown to commemorate his contribution and presence in the community. The home is located on Belmont St. in Charlottetown and was built in 1950. Messer bought the home in 1960 and lived there for several years.

The Maritime Fiddle Festival created a trophy in Messer's honour in 1986. The trophy is award to the fiddler with the highest points at the festival, with the award noted to commemorate the "greatest fiddler of them all."

== Albums ==
- Don Messer's Centennial Souvenir Album (LP, Album), Apex, AL 1644, 1967
- The Very Best Of Don Messer, MCA Records (Canada), 1973
- Don Messer / Johnny Forrest - Don Messer Presents Scottish Songs Sung By Johnny Forrest, MCA Coral, 1973
- A Tribute To Don Messer, K-Tel International
- The Down East Dance Music Of Don Messer & His Islanders (LP), Apex, AL 1637
- Don Messer's Back! (LP, Album), Apex, AL 7-1651
- The Best Of Don Messer (CD, Comp), Universal Music, 2005

== Awards ==
- Inductee, Canadian Country Music Association (CCMA) Hall of Honor (1985)
- Inductee, Canadian Country Music Hall of Fame (1989)
