= Pick the Stars =

- Presented by: Dick MacDougal (1954–56); Pat Morgan (1956–57)
- Country of origin: Canada
- Original language: English
- No. of seasons: 3
- No. of episodes: 117

Production
- Producers: Drew Crossan (1954–55); Jim Guthro (1955–57)
- Running time: 30 minutes

Original release
- Network: CBC Television
- Release: 28 September 1954 – 18 June 1957

Pick the Stars is a Canadian talent competition television program that aired on CBC Television from 1954 to 1957.

== Premise ==
Singers, dancers, musicians and other performers competed for cash prizes in this early Canadian talent show, replacing the 1952–54 series Now's Your Chance. Canada Packers was the series sponsor.

The competition for the first two seasons was structured as six sets of six episodes each. In each set, there were five episodes of general competitions. The winners of each of these episodes competed in a sixth semi-final episode. Following these 36 episodes were two episodes in which the semi-final winners competed, an finally a 39th episode in which two grand prize winners were determined.

For the first two seasons, contestants were judged by a panel at the studio. Semi-finalists were determined by mail sent by viewers. For the first season, panelists included Midge Arthur (wife and partner of entertainer and producer Jack Arthur), Herman Geiger-Torel (Royal Conservatory of Music), Clyde Gilmour (film critic) and Ernest Rawley (Royal Alexandra Theatre manager).

== Production ==
The half-hour program aired on Tuesday nights throughout its run, in either a 9 or 9:30 p.m. time slot.

== 1954–55 season ==
The first episode of Pick the Stars began on 28 September 1954 in its regular 9 p.m. Tuesday schedule.

For the first two seasons, Dick MacDougal (Tabloid) hosted the series while Samuel Hersenhoren conducted the house orchestra. Drew Crossan produced the first season.

$500 cash prizes were awarded to semi-final winners, for example Quebec singer Denise Anger won a semi-final on 29 March 1955.

Competitions of the semi-final winners were broadcast on 7 and 14 June 1955. The judging panel featured Jack Arthur, Leslie Bell, Clyde Gilmour, Gweneth Lloyd and Ruth Lowe.

Irene Andrian and Pat Morgan won the $1000 grand prizes on 21 June 1955 season finale at the Eaton Auditorium. Andrian was a singer who was already featured on CBC's Tzigane series while Morgan was a night club singer and presenter.

During the first season, Globe and Mail entertainment columnist Alex Barris noted an incident in which host Dick MacDougal wished a contestant with the words "good luck". However, MacDougal was reportedly forbidden from using that phrase since it was the brand name of a margarine product that competed with sponsor Canada Packers.

== 1955–56 season ==
The second season began on 27 September 1955, in a 9:30 p.m. Tuesday time slot. The set was updated to resemble a living room. Jim Guthro was the new series producer in the second season.

Robert Goulet competed on the show in November 1955. He earned a first place tie on that episode with Margot Leclair, a singer from Montreal.

Also in November 1955, conductor Sammy Hersenhoren's baton slipped, causing a significant self-inflicted injury to his right eye, although he continued to conduct until the end of the episode.

The second season concluded with a 19 June 1956 broadcast from Toronto's Odeon-Carlton Theatre. The grand prize winners were Vancouver singer Lorraine Foreman and British singers and dancers Peggy and Pat Doyle.

== 1956–57 season ==
CBC made unsuccessful attempts to broadcast the series from Toronto's Loews-Uptown theatre for the third season. Instead, the production originated from CBC's Studio 4 for its 25 September 1956 season debut. Pat Morgan, a 1955 grand prize winner, became the new series host. Lucio Agostini returned from music projects in the United States and replaced Hersenhoren as the series band conductor.

The judging system was changed for the third and final season of Pick the Stars. Three judges were now located in various Canadian cities outside the studio and communicated their votes through telephone calls. There was no longer a competition for the entire season but rather winners were determined per episode. An applause meter was also used to determine winners.

Auditions for potential contestants were conducted throughout Canada in late 1956, including St. John's, Newfoundland.

The episode on 25 December 1956 was produced at the Winnipeg Auditorium.

Episodes aired Tuesdays at 9:30 p.m. Its finale on 25 June 1957 featured performers Brian Beaton (folk singer), Reginald Bryant (singer), Nicholas Genovese (tenor singer) and Helen Valenaks (piano). CBC cancelled the series by August 1957.

== Notable guests ==
- Paul Anka
- Dave Broadfoot (later of Royal Canadian Air Farce), February 1955
- Rich Little
- The Travellers, 1956 finalists
- Country singer Tommy Common considered his December 1955 appearance as his "first break"
- Performer Robert John Pratt, later mayor of Dorval, Quebec, appeared as an expert in an April 1956 episode.
- Marilyn Reddick, Miss Canada winner in 1952, competed on 1 November 1955 semi-finals.
