= Folk Songs with Ed McCurdy =

Canadian television series

- Country of origin: Canada
- Original language: English
- No. of seasons: 1

Original release
- Network: CBC Television
- Release: 1 July – 16 September 1961

Folk Songs With Ed McCurdy is a Canadian television series that aired on CBC Television in 1961.

== Premise ==
This Halifax-based production was hosted by folk singer Ed McCurdy who performed on some of the earliest broadcasts on CBC Television. Performance of folk songs were accompanied by discussion of their background.

== Scheduling ==
This 15-minute series was broadcast Saturdays at 6:30 p.m. (Eastern) from 1 July to 16 September 1961.
