= Geoff Shepard =

American lawyer, author, and lecturer (born 1944)

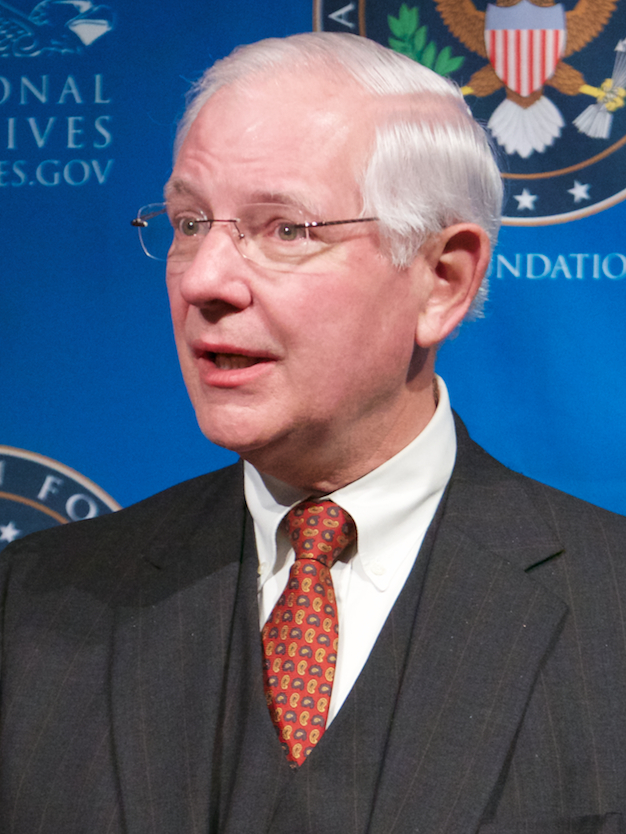
Shepard in 2014

Geoffrey Carroll Shepard (born November 7, 1944) is an American lawyer, author, and lecturer.

== Early life ==
Geoff Shepard was born in Santa Barbara, California and grew up in Southern California. His graduating class from the Irvine Elementary School in 1958 consisted of only thirty-two students. He graduated from Woodrow Wilson High School in Long Beach in 1962. He went on to Whittier College and was a member of the debate team, student body president and recipient of the Richard Nixon scholarship – which was awarded by Nixon himself at a luncheon in 1965 and had been partially funded by Nixon.

Shepard received his JD from Harvard Law School, with honors, in 1969, where he was ranked in the top fifth of his class.

== Nixon administration ==
Upon graduation, Shepard was selected as a 1969–1970 White House Fellow, one of fifteen young Americans chosen to spend that year serving in the Executive Branch. He worked at the Treasury Department, as Special Assistant to the Secretary.

In September 1970, Shepard was hired by John Ehrlichman, Assistant to the President for Domestic Affairs, onto his Domestic Council staff. That staff, the counterpart to the National Security Council staff under Henry Kissinger, worked with the President on domestic issues of national importance. Shepard's immediate superior was Egil Krogh, later to become notorious as the head of the White House Plumbers. Shepard succeeded Krogh as Associate Director for General Government in 1972 and was re-appointed to that position by President Gerald R. Ford in 1974. He left the White House staff in 1975, having authored hundreds of policy memoranda for presidents Nixon and Ford and their senior staff.

During the unfolding of the Watergate scandal, Shepard also functioned as principal deputy to J. Fred Buzhardt, President Nixon's Watergate defense counsel. In that capacity, he helped transcribe the White House tapes, was placed in charge of the Document Rooms holding the seized files of John Dean, John Ehrlichman and H.R. Haldeman and worked with Bryce Harlow and Dean Burch in their roles as White House Counselors.

== Later life ==
Geoff Shepard began his career as a lawyer in the insurance industry when he joined the Insurance Company of North America (INA) in 1977, where he became senior vice president and associate general counsel. INA merged with Connecticut General to form CIGNA in 1982, where Shepard was corporate secretary and then chief counsel of its property/casualty group.

Shepard joined the Reliance Insurance Group in 1991 as senior vice president and general counsel of Reliance Insurance Company, a position he held through 1994, when he joined AXA-Equitable Company as president of the Corporate Division of Karr Barth Associates, its largest agency. Shepard retired from AXA-Equitable in 2011.

Shepard's first book, The Secret Plot to Make Ted Kennedy President, was published by Penguin Sentinel in 2008.

Beginning in 2010, Shepard began arranging and producing a documentary series, "Nixon Legacy Forums," videotaped discussions of Nixon staff members discussing various Nixon Administration policy initiatives. The forums are co-sponsored by the Richard Nixon Foundation and the National Archives and Records Administration. Many also have been broadcast on C-SPAN's American History Channel. Links to almost three dozen of the forums on which Shepard has worked can be found on his website.

In August 2015, Shepard's second book The Real Watergate Scandal was published by Regnery Publishing.

He taught a revisionist history course at Temple University in Philadelphia in 2019, "Watergate Revisited, An Insider’s View." In October 2021, Shepard's third book, The Nixon Conspiracy, Watergate and the Plot to Remove the President, was published by Bombardier Books.
