= Stu Phillips (country singer) =

Canadian country music singer (1933–2025)

- Born: Stuart Phillips; January 19, 1933; Montréal, Québec, Canada
- Origin: Calgary, Alberta, Canada
- Died: December 25, 2025 (aged 92) Nashville, Tennessee, U.S.
- Genre: Country
- Occupation: Singer-songwriter
- Instrument: Vocals
- Years active: 1965–2025

Stu Phillips (January 19, 1933 – December 25, 2025) was a Canadian-American country singer from Montreal, Quebec. Stu and his wife Aldona operated Long Hollow Winery in Goodlettsville, near Nashville. He was also an ordained Minister in the Episcopal Church. He was a long-time host of CBC's Red River Jamboree. He was also a standing member of the Grand Ole Opry. Stu Phillips was part of RCA and featured on their The Best of Country and West volumes 1 and 2 with "Bracero" and "The Last Thing on My Mind". Phillips was inducted into the Canadian Country Music Hall of Fame in 1993. He was ranked #29 in RPM Magazine's top 57 Canadian Country artists from 1964 to 1994.

Prior to his death, he had been the oldest living member of the Grand Ole Opry for nearly a year. He died in Nashville on December 25, 2025, at the age of 92.

== Discography ==
=== Albums ===
Year	Album	US Country
1966	Singin'	14
1967	Grassroots Country	36
1968	Our Last Rendezvous	
1976	Have a Nice Day	
1993	Don't Give Up on Me	
1993	Journey Through the Provinces	
1996	Blue Canadian Rockies	
1998	You Love the Hurt Away	

=== Singles ===
Year	Single	Peak chart positions			Album
Year	Single	CAN Country	CAN AC	US Country	Album
1965	"Kathy Keep Playing"	1	—	—	Singin'
1966	"Bracero"	—	—	39	Singin'
1966	"The Great El Tigre (The Tiger)"	—	—	32	Singin'
1967	"Walk Me to the Station"	—	—	44	Grassroots Country
1967	"Vin Rosé"	—	—	21	Our Last Rendezvous
1967	"Juanita Jones"	—	—	13	Our Last Rendezvous
1968	"The Note in Box Number 9"	—	—	62	Our Last Rendezvous
1968	"Our Last Rendezvous"	—	—	—	Our Last Rendezvous
1968	"Top of the World"	—	—	53	Our Last Rendezvous
1968	"Bring Love Back Into Our World"	—	—	68	Single only
1969	"Rings of Grass"	—	—	—	Single only
1969	"Little Tin God"	—	—	—	Single only
