= Marg Osburne =

Canadian singer (1927–1977)

- Marg Osburne

Background information
- Also known as: The Girl from the Singing Hills
- Born: Verna Marguerite Osburne; December 29, 1927; Moncton, New Brunswick, Canada
- Died: July 16, 1977 (aged 49) Rocklyn, Ontario, Canada
- Genres: Country, gospel, folk
- Occupations: Singer-Songwriter; Vocalist
- Instruments: Vocals, Guitar
- Years active: 1945 – 1977
- Labels: Apex, Coral, Point, Arc, Rodeo, Banff, Marathon, OAK Country Music, Condor

Marg Osburne (December 29, 1927 – July 16, 1977) was a Canadian country, folk and gospel singer. She was a recipient (posthumously) of the ECMA Stompin' Tom Connors award.

== Early life ==
She was born in Moncton, New Brunswick and received her vocal training as a member of a community choir.

== Career ==
When she was 17 her cousin made her a bet that she did not have the nerve to answer a newspaper advertisement for a female vocalist for CKCW in Moncton. Osburne answered the ad and got the job. Osburne explained in a later interview that she took the job because she "needed money to go to the Movies".

Don Messer was travelling through Moncton in 1947 and heard Osburne singing on CKCW, billed as "The Girl From the Singing Hills". He hired her to fill in for Charlie Chamberlain who was recovering from an automobile accident. She soon became the group's lead singer.

Don Messer and His Islanders were then broadcasting on CFCY out of Charlottetown, PEI thrice-weekly beginning in 1939 and the show was broadcast nationwide by the CBC.

Osburne and Chamberlain became regular performers on the show and made a number of recordings. The group toured each summer. They mounted a national tour in 1967 as part of Canada's Centennial, playing 66 shows across the country.

1956 brought about the first appearance of "The Islanders" on television when CFCY radio launched CFCY-TV. When Messer made the move to Halifax in 1958, most of the band followed - including Osburne. From being occasional TV guests, the band began a summer series called The Don Messer Show on August 7, 1959 as a replacement for Country Hoedown broadcast on CBC television. The show continued in the fall as Don Messer's Jubilee. Osburne remained with the show throughout the 1960s, winning a wide audience across the country as one of the show stars, and enlarging her fan base dramatically.

After Messer died in 1973, Osburne began a second career as a nightclub singer. She performed frequently in the Western Provinces and Territories of Canada. During this period she recorded three songs for Jack Boswell's Marathon label, "Albert County Soil", "Falling Leaves", and "Blues Comin' 'Round". "Falling Leaves" is also the only song she wrote herself.

== Death ==
Osburne continued to perform until July 16, 1977, when she collapsed during a concert in Rocklyn, Ontario and died from the heart attack before she reached the hospital, exactly five years after Charlie Chamberlain's death. She was 49 years old.

== Discography ==
=== Albums ===
Year	Album
1959	By Request: Favourite Sacred Songs (with Charlie Chamberlain)
1959	A Century of Folk Songs
1960	Songs Of Reverence - Vol.2 (with Charlie Chamberlain)
1966	The Best of Marg Osburne
1967	They Never Grow Old (with Charlie Chamberlain)
1967	Favorite Sacred Songs (with Charlie Chamberlain)
1968	The Golden Era of Marg Osburne
1972	My Kind of Country (with Melody Faye)
1973	Country Gospel
1974	Old, Gold, and New

=== Singles ===
Year	Single	CAN Country	Album
1972	"Albert Country Soil"	15	My Kind of Country
1974	"Blues Comin' 'Round"	19	Old, Gold, and New
1974	"City of Tears"	20	Old, Gold, and New

== Bibliography ==
- Large, Betty Rogers and Crothers, Tom, Out of Thin Air, Applecross Press, Charlottetown, Prince Edward Island, 1989. ISBN 9780969420507
