= 1964 in Canadian music =

== Births ==
- 18 January – Jim Matt, country music singer.
- 18 January – Patrick Esposito Di Napoli, member of Les Colocs (d.1994).
- 25 January – Andrew MacNaughtan, photographer and music video director (d.2012).
- 30 January – Patricia Conroy, country music singer.
- 1 February – Dwayne Goettel, former member of Skinny Puppy (d.1995).
- 6 February – Gordon Downie, lead singer and lyricist for The Tragically Hip.
- 8 March – Denise Murray, country music singer.
- 8 June – Mark Howard, audio engineer.
- 17 August – Colin James, Juno Award-winning singer-songwriter, and guitarist.
- 12 September – Greg McConnell, indie rocker and member of Absolute Whores (d.1999).
- 16 November – Diana Krall, Grammy and Juno Awards winning jazz musician.
- 29 November – Jesse Cook, Juno Award-winning guitarist.
- 30 November – Edwin Orion Brownell, neo-classical composer and concert pianist.
- 7 December – Kyp Harness, folk singer and social activist.

Full date unknown

- Charest, Benoît, guitarist and film score composer.
- Danna, Jeff, film score composer
- Lee, Brent, composer and professor of Music Composition at the University of Windsor.
- Ichkhanian, Levon, jazz composer and guitarist

== Events ==
=== Albums released ===
- Lorne Greene, The Man

=== Awards ===
- 28 December, the 1st RPM Awards are announced.

=== Festivals ===
- Mariposa Folk Festival was held at the Maple Leaf Stadium
- Miramichi Folksong Festival
- Montreal Festivals

=== Magazines and publications ===
- 24 February – RPM publishes first issue.

=== Music groups ===
Bands formed

- 3's a Crowd (band)
- Chai Folk Ensemble
- Jack London & The Sparrows
- The Mynah Birds

Bands disbanded

- CBC Symphony Orchestra
- The Crew-Cuts

=== Organisations ===
- Alberta Music Festival Association is established to coordinate local music competition.

=== Singles released ===
- "My Baby's Comin' Home" by Paul Anka

=== Songs ===
- Early Morning Rain, composed and recorded by Gordon Lightfoot.
- Mon Pays ("My Homeland") composed by Gilles Vigneault.
- Universal Soldier (song), written and recorded Buffy Sainte-Marie.
- You Were on My Mind, written by Sylvia Tyson.

=== Venues ===
- The Matador Club, a country-music venue, opens in Toronto.

=== Other ===
- 10 April – Glenn Gould retires from public performance in Los Angeles.

== Deaths ==
- 7 January – Colin McPhee, composer and musicologist.
- 9 September – Charles O'Neill, bandmaster, composer, organist, cornetist, and music educator.
- 24 November – Georges-Émile Tanguay, composer, organist, pianist, and music educator.
- 27 December – Pierre-Aurèle Asselin, tenor singer, brother to Marie-Anne Asselin.

== See also ==
- 1964 in music
- 1964 in Canada
- 1964 in Canadian television

Preceded by 1963 in Canadian music	Category:Years in Canadian music 1964	Succeeded by 1965 in Canadian music
