= 1966 in Canada =

- Decades: 1940s; 1950s; 1960s; 1970s; 1980s
- See also: History of Canada; Timeline of Canadian history; List of years in Canada

Events from the year 1966 in Canada.

== Incumbents ==
=== Crown ===
- Monarch – Elizabeth II

=== Federal government ===
- Governor General – Georges Vanier
- Prime Minister – Lester B. Pearson
- Chief Justice – Robert Taschereau (Quebec)
- Parliament – 27th

=== Provincial governments ===
==== Lieutenant governors ====
- Lieutenant Governor of Alberta – John Percy Page (until January 6) then Grant MacEwan
- Lieutenant Governor of British Columbia – George Pearkes
- Lieutenant Governor of Manitoba – Richard Spink Bowles
- Lieutenant Governor of New Brunswick – John B. McNair
- Lieutenant Governor of Newfoundland – Fabian O'Dea
- Lieutenant Governor of Nova Scotia – Henry Poole MacKeen
- Lieutenant Governor of Ontario – William Earl Rowe
- Lieutenant Governor of Prince Edward Island – Willibald Joseph MacDonald
- Lieutenant Governor of Quebec – Paul Comtois (until February 22) then Hugues Lapointe
- Lieutenant Governor of Saskatchewan – Robert Hanbidge

==== Premiers ====
- Premier of Alberta – Ernest Manning
- Premier of British Columbia – W.A.C. Bennett
- Premier of Manitoba – Dufferin Roblin
- Premier of New Brunswick – Louis Robichaud
- Premier of Newfoundland – Joey Smallwood
- Premier of Nova Scotia – Robert Stanfield
- Premier of Ontario – John Robarts
- Premier of Prince Edward Island – Walter Shaw (until July 28) then Alexander B. Campbell
- Premier of Quebec – Jean Lesage (until June 16) then Daniel Johnson, Sr.
- Premier of Saskatchewan – Ross Thatcher

=== Territorial governments ===
==== Commissioners ====
- Commissioner of Yukon – Gordon Robertson Cameron (until November 7) then James Smith
- Commissioner of Northwest Territories – Bent Gestur Sivertz

== Events ==
- January 1: The Canada Pension Plan and the Quebec Pension Plan both begin operation
- February 25: Toronto Transit Commission inaugurates the Bloor-Danforth Subway line.
- March 4: The Munsinger Affair is Canada's first major political sex scandal
- May 1: Army camps, RCAF stations, and the RCN's land-based installations become Canadian Forces bases. Training schools and the pay system are unified.
- May 18: Paul Joseph Chartier is killed when a bomb he is carrying goes off on Parliament Hill
- June 5: The Union Nationale under Daniel Johnson, Sr. is elected in Quebec.

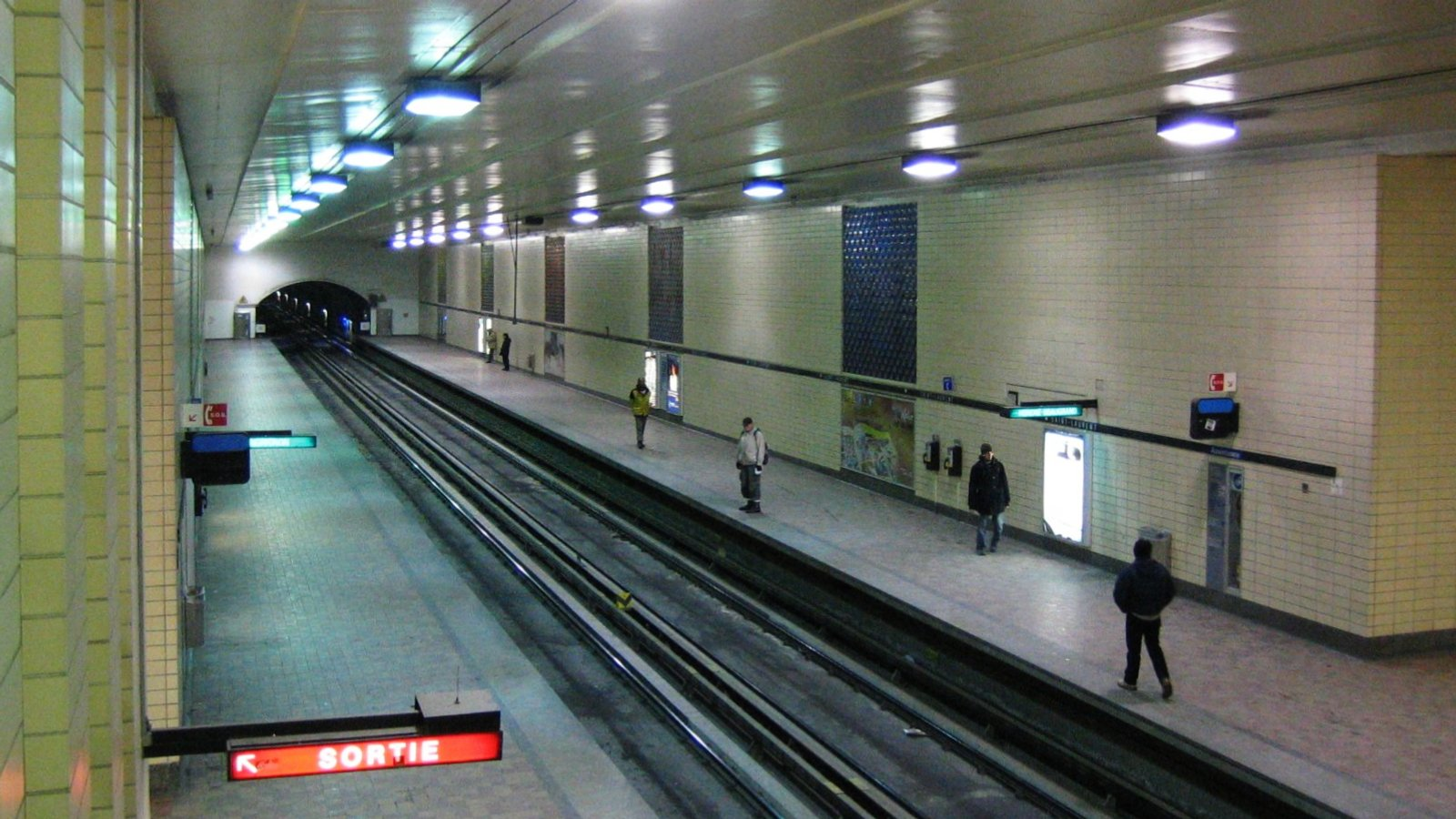
Montreal Metro opens

- June 16: Daniel Johnson, Sr., becomes premier of Quebec, replacing Jean Lesage
- July 28: Alexander B. Campbell becomes premier of Prince Edward Island, replacing Walter Shaw
- September 1: The CBC becomes the first Canadian television network to broadcast in colour, followed within days by the private-sector CTV Television Network.
- October 14: Montreal inaugurates its metro system (see Montreal Metro).
- October 17: The Montreal Metro opens
- November 4: Bill C-243, The Canadian Forces Reorganization Act, is introduced in Parliament.
- December 31: The Centennial Flame in front of Parliament Hill is lit
- The Revolutionary Strategy and the Role of the Avant-Garde outlining the strategy of the FLQ is written.
- The Seasonal Agricultural Workers Program is established.
- The Medical Care Act is passed, helping set up the Medicare system

=== Unknown ===
- The first Brazilian Carnival Ball is held in Toronto.
- The Glenbow Museum opens in Calgary.

== Arts and literature ==
=== New works ===
- Cold Mountain. Singing Hands Series 3 by B. P. Nichol
- The Circle Game by Margaret Atwood
- Expeditions by Margaret Atwood
- Speeches for Doctor Frankenstein by Margaret Atwood
- Beautiful Losers by Leonard Cohen

=== Awards ===
- See 1966 Governor General's Awards for a complete list of winners and finalists for those awards.
- Stephen Leacock Award: George Bain, Nursery Rhymes to Be Read Aloud by Young Parents with Old Children
- Vicky Metcalf Award: Fred Savage

=== Music ===
- March 3: Canadian Neil Young, joins Stephen Stills and Richie Furay to form Buffalo Springfield.

=== Television ===
- Star Trek premieres starring Montreal actor William Shatner

== Sports ==
- January 7 – Gene Kiniski wins his first (and only) NWA World Heavyweight Championship title by defeating Lou Thesz. Kiniski becomes the third Canadian to win the NWA title
- March 5 – The Toronto Varsity Blues win their first University Cup by defeating the Alberta Golden Bears 8–1, The final game was played at Sudbury Community Arena
- March 12 – Bobby Hull sets the record for the most goals in a National Hockey League (NHL) season.
- May 5 – The Montreal Canadiens win their 14th Stanley Cup by defeating the Detroit Red Wings 4 games to 2. Bracebridge, Ontario's Roger Crozier won the Conn Smythe Trophy in a losing effort.
- May 15 – The Central Alberta Hockey League's Edmonton Oil Kings win their second Memorial Cup by defeating the Ontario Hockey Association's Oshawa Generals 4 games 2. All games were played Maple Leaf Gardens in Toronto
- November 19 – The St. Francis Xavier X-Men win their first Vanier Cup by defeating the Waterloo Lutheran Golden Hawks 40–14 in the 2nd Vanier Cup played at Varsity Stadium in Toronto
- November 26 – The Saskatchewan Roughriders win their first Grey Cup by defeating the Ottawa Rough Riders 29–14 in the 54th Grey Cup played at Empire Stadium in Vancouver

== Births ==
=== January to March ===
- January 2 – James Cantor, clinical psychologist and sexologist
- January 14 – Rene Simpson, tennis player (d. 2013)
- January 23 – Bernadette Bowyer, field hockey player
- January 24 – Michael Forgeron, rower and Olympic gold medallist
- January 30 – Doug Wood, pole vaulter
- February 17 – Luc Robitaille, ice hockey player
- February 20 – Louis Ferreira, actor
- February 27 – Donal Logue, actor
- March 1 – Susan Auch, speed skater and double Olympic silver medallist
- March 16 – Chrissy Redden, cyclist
- March 20 – Chris Gifford, field hockey player
- March 25 – Jeff Healey, jazz and blues-rock guitarist and vocalist (d. 2008)
- March 25 – David Hohl, wrestler
- March 29 – Pamela Rai, Olympic swimmer
- March 31 – Nathalie Gosselin, judoka

=== April to June ===
- April 13 – Mike Carney, alpine skier
- April 14 – André Boisclair, politician
- April 15 – Beverly Thomson, television personality, journalist, and correspondent for CTV Television Network
- April 19 – David La Haye, actor
- April 20 – Vincent Riendeau, ice hockey player and coach
- April 24 – David Usher, rock singer-songwriter
- May 2 – Belinda Stronach, politician and Minister, businessperson and philanthropist
- May 11 – Michelle MacPherson, swimmer and Olympic bronze medallist
- May 12 – Anne Ottenbrite, swimmer and Olympic gold medallist
- May 23 – Gary Roberts, ice hockey player
- June 5 – Dwayne Hill, voice actor
- June 12 – Michael Redhill, poet, playwright and novelist
- June 18 – Kurt Browning, figure skater and four-time World Champion, choreographer
- June 19 – Mike Hasenfratz, ice hockey referee (d. 2024)
- June 24 – Debbie Fuller, diver
- June 26 – Kirk McLean, ice hockey player
- June 29 – John Part, darts player
- June 30
  - Cheryl Bernard, curler
  - Peter Outerbridge, actor

=== July to September ===
- August 3 – Brent Butt, comedian and TV producer
- August 27 – Gianni Vignaduzzi, track cyclist
- September 10 – Joe Nieuwendyk, ice hockey player and manager
- September 27 – Gerry Byrne, politician

=== October to December ===
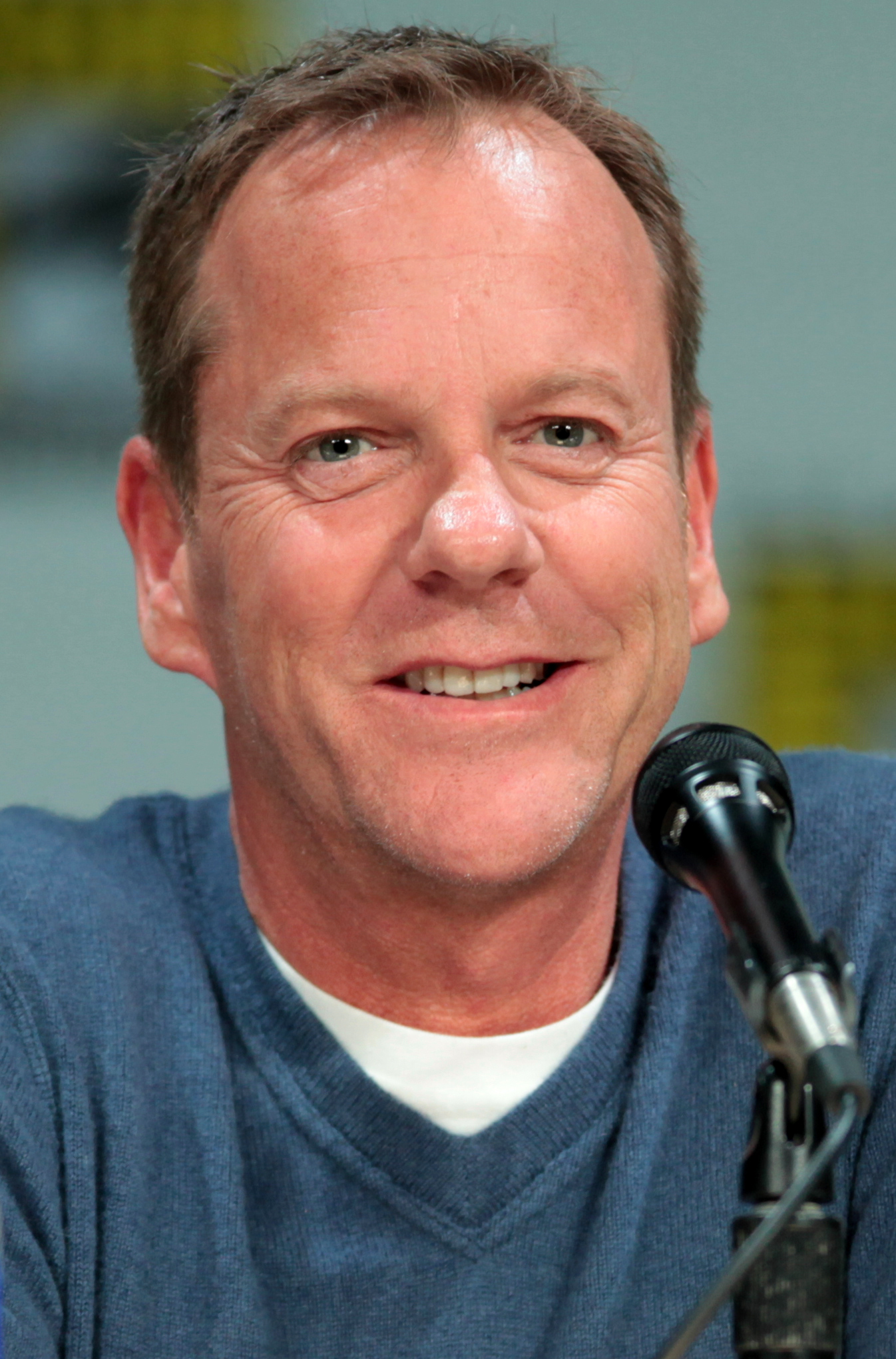
Kiefer Sutherland at San Diego Comic-Con in 2014

- October 17 – Peter Milkovich, field hockey player and coach
- October 24 – Conrad Pla, kickboxer and actor
- October 25 – Wendel Clark, ice hockey player
- October 31 – Kirsty Duncan, politician (d. 2026)
- November 5 – Leni Parker, actress
- November 8 – Michael Soles, footballer (d. 2021)
- November 9 – Lisa Faust, field hockey player
- November 11 – Peaches, musician
- November 14 – André Gingras, dancer and choreographer (d. 2013)
- November 16 – Dean McDermott, Canadian-American actor
- November 21 – Christopher Bowie, swimmer
- December 1 – Larry Walker, baseball player
- December 5 – Deb Whitten, field hockey player
- December 8 – Tyler Mane, actor and wrestler
- December 10 – Dana Murzyn, ice hockey player
- December 14 – Bill Ranford, ice hockey player
- December 19 – Darren Dutchyshen, sportscaster (d. 2024)
- December 21 – Kiefer Sutherland, actor

=== Full date unknown ===
- Stéphane Demers, actor

== Deaths ==
- January 22 – Morris Gray, politician (b.1889)
- February 6 - R.T.M. Scott, author
- April 8 – Robert Methven Petrie, astronomer (b.1906)
- May 18 – Paul Joseph Chartier, truck driver who attempted to bomb Canadian parliament (b.1921)
- July 11 – Andrew McNaughton, army officer, politician and diplomat (b.1887)
- September 5 – William Murdoch Buchanan, politician (b.1897)
- September 10 – Blodwen Davies, writer (b.1897)
- September 15 – Leonard Brockington, lawyer, civil servant and first head of the Canadian Broadcasting Corporation (CBC) (b.1888)
- October 18 – Elizabeth Arden, businesswoman (b.1884)
- November 23 - Jean Baptiste Paul, Canadian First Nations wrestler (b.1896)
- December 2 - Ralph Allen, author and journalist (b.1913)

== See also ==
- 1966 in Canadian television
- List of Canadian films
