= 1967 in Canada =

- Decades: 1940s; 1950s; 1960s; 1970s; 1980s
- See also: History of Canada; Timeline of Canadian history; List of years in Canada

Logo of Canada's centennial celebrations in 1967

1967 is remembered as one of the most notable years in Canada. It was the centenary of Canadian Confederation and celebrations were held throughout the nation. The most prominent event was Expo 67 in Montreal, the most successful World's Fair ever held up to that time, and one of the first events to win international acclaim for the country. The year saw the nation's Governor General, Georges Vanier, die in office; and two prominent federal leaders, Official Opposition Leader John Diefenbaker, and Prime Minister Lester B. Pearson announced their resignations. The year's top news-story was French President Charles de Gaulle's "Vive le Québec libre" speech in Montreal. The year also saw major changes in youth culture with the "hippies" in Toronto's Yorkville area becoming front-page news over their lifestyle choices and battles with Toronto City Council. A new honours system was announced, the Order of Canada. In sports, the Toronto Maple Leafs won their 13th and last Stanley Cup.

In mountaineering, the year saw the first ascents of the highest peak in the remote Arctic Cordillera.

== Overview ==
The nation began to feel far more nationalistic than before, with a generation raised in a country fully detached from Britain. The new Canadian flag served as a symbol and a catalyst for this. In Quebec, the Quiet Revolution was overthrowing the oligarchy of francophone clergy and anglophone businessmen, and French Canadian pride and nationalism were becoming a national political force.

The Canadian economy was at its post-war peak, and levels of prosperity and quality of life were at all-time highs. Many of the most important elements of Canada's welfare state were coming on line, such as Medicare and the Canada Pension Plan (CPP).

These events were coupled with the coming of age of the baby boom and the regeneration of music, literature, and art that the 1960s brought around the world. The baby boomers, who have since dominated Canada's culture, tend to view the period as Canada's halcyon days.

1967 was an exciting year for Canadians. Communities across the country planned celebrations to mark the 100th anniversary of confederation. The Federal Government sponsored events from coast to coast and provided funding and organization for such things as the Centennial Train and the Centennial Voyageur Canoe Pageant. Even Canada's military got the spirit by producing the Canadian Armed Forces Tattoo 1967 that toured the country from coast to coast with over 150 shows from St. John's, Newfoundland to Victoria, BC with a two week long production at EXPO 67 in Montreal. Tattoo 1967 was so successful, there were calls to have the show tour the world as a representative of Canadian culture. The show set a world's record for the longest running military tattoo, a record that has never been equaled.

While to Montreal it was the year of Expo, to Toronto it was the culmination of the Toronto Maple Leafs dynasty of the 1960s, with the team winning its fourth Stanley Cup in six years by defeating its arch-rival, the Montreal Canadiens, in the last all-Canadian Stanley Cup Finals until 1986.

Author and historian Pierre Berton famously referred to 1967 as Canada's last good year. In his analysis, the years following saw much of 1967's hopefulness disappear. In the early 1970s, the oil shock and other factors hammered the Canadian economy. Quebec separatism led to divisive debates and an economic decline of Montreal and Front de libération du Québec (FLQ) terrorism. The Vietnam War and Watergate Scandal in the United States also had profound effects on Canadians. Berton reported that Toronto hockey fans also note that the Maple Leafs have not won a Stanley Cup since.

== Incumbents ==
=== Crown ===
- Monarch – Elizabeth II

=== Federal government ===
- Governor General – Georges Vanier (until March 5) then Roland Michener (from April 17)
- Prime Minister – Lester B. Pearson
- Chief Justice – Robert Taschereau (Quebec) (until September 1) then John Robert Cartwright (Ontario)
- Parliament – 27th

=== Provincial governments ===
==== Lieutenant governors ====
- Lieutenant Governor of Alberta – Grant MacEwan
- Lieutenant Governor of British Columbia – George Pearkes
- Lieutenant Governor of Manitoba – Richard Spink Bowles
- Lieutenant Governor of New Brunswick – John B. McNair
- Lieutenant Governor of Newfoundland – Fabian O'Dea
- Lieutenant Governor of Nova Scotia – Henry Poole MacKeen
- Lieutenant Governor of Ontario – William Earl Rowe
- Lieutenant Governor of Prince Edward Island – Willibald Joseph MacDonald
- Lieutenant Governor of Quebec – Hugues Lapointe
- Lieutenant Governor of Saskatchewan – Robert Hanbidge

==== Premiers ====
- Premier of Alberta – Ernest Manning
- Premier of British Columbia – W.A.C. Bennett
- Premier of Manitoba – Dufferin Roblin (until November 27) then Walter Weir
- Premier of New Brunswick – Louis Robichaud
- Premier of Newfoundland – Joey Smallwood
- Premier of Nova Scotia – Robert Stanfield (until September 13) then G.I. Smith
- Premier of Ontario – John Robarts
- Premier of Prince Edward Island – Alexander B. Campbell
- Premier of Quebec – Daniel Johnson, Sr.
- Premier of Saskatchewan – Ross Thatcher

=== Territorial governments ===
==== Commissioners ====
- Commissioner of Yukon – James Smith
- Commissioner of Northwest Territories – Bent Gestur Sivertz (until March 2) then Stuart Milton Hodgson

== Events ==
=== January to June ===
- January 1: Several municipalities such as Forest Hill and Swansea are merged into Toronto
- January 7: Robert Nixon is elected leader of the Ontario Liberal Party
- March 25: After the death of Georges Vanier, Roland Michener becomes Governor General
- April 17: The Order of Canada is created
- April 27: Expo 67 Official Opening Ceremony broadcast in colour live via satellite to an estimated worldwide audience of 700 million viewers and listeners.
- April 28: Expo 67 opens to the public at 9:30 a.m. in Montreal
- April: Bill C-243, The Canadian Forces Reorganization Act, is given third and final reading in the House of Commons
- May: The GO Transit service begins in Toronto
- May 23: Alberta election: Ernest Manning's Social Credit Party wins a ninth consecutive majority
- June 5: Geoffrey Hattersley-Smith becomes the first person to climb Barbeau Peak, the highest point in the Arctic Cordillera
- June 20: The National Library of Canada opens

=== July to December ===
- July 1: Canada celebrates its centennial
- July 24: During an official state visit to Canada, French President Charles de Gaulle declares to a crowd of over 100,000 in Montreal: Vive le Québec libre! (Long live free Quebec!). The statement, interpreted as support for Quebec independence, delighted many francophone Quebecers but angered the Canadian government and many English Canadians, resulting in de Gaulle's early departure from Canada. It is voted as the top news story from Canada by newspaper and radio journalists.
- July 30: The Caribbean community in Toronto stages the first Caribana, with only eight bands and 1,000 spectators. It later grows into the third largest carnival in the world, drawing over 1 million spectators and 250,000 visitors a year.
- August 5: A man with schizophrenia, Victor Hoffman, kills nine near Shell Lake, Saskatchewan
- September 9: Robert Stanfield wins the leadership of the Progressive Conservative Party
- September 13: G.I. Smith becomes premier of Nova Scotia, replacing Robert Stanfield
- October 5–6: Ucluelet records Canada's heaviest ever 24-hour rainfall with 489.2 millimetres (19.26 in).
- October 11: Saskatchewan election: Ross Thatcher's Liberals win a second consecutive majority
- October 14: René Lévesque quits the Quebec Liberal Party and leaves to form the Mouvement Souveraineté-Association
- October 17: Ontario election: John Robarts's PCs win a seventh consecutive majority
- October 29: Expo 67 closes, setting attendance records.
- November 5: Robert Stanfield becomes head of the federal Progressive Conservative Party
- November 16: The Museum of Science and Technology opens in Ottawa
- November 27: Walter Weir becomes premier of Manitoba, replacing Dufferin Roblin
- November 27: A conference organized by John Robarts of Ontario brings together all the provincial premiers to discuss the constitution
- December 14: Lester B. Pearson announces he will step down as prime minister early in the next year
- December 27: Justice Minister Pierre Trudeau proposes sweeping reforms that will, among other things, decriminalize homosexual acts.
- December 29: Royal Commission on Bilingualism and Biculturalism delivers first volume its report.

=== Full date unknown ===
- Mary Walker-Sawka becomes the first woman to be nominated as a candidate for the leadership of a federal political party.
- The University of Lethbridge is founded

== Arts and literature ==
=== New books ===
- Morley Callaghan: Stories
- Timothy Findley: The Last of the Crazy People
- Hugh Hood: The Camera Always Lies
- Farley Mowat: The Polar Passion

=== Poetry ===
- Margaret Atwood, The Circle Game, won a Governor General's award and "sold out immediately"
- John Robert Colombo, Abracadabra
- D. G. Jones, Phrases from Orpheus
- Dorothy Livesay, The Unquiet Bed, Canadian and African experiences
- Eli Mandel, An Idiot Joy
- Michael Ondaatje, The Dainty Monsters, Toronto: Coach House Press
- P. K. Page, Cry Ararat!: Poems New and Selected
- Al Purdy, North of Summer, a diary in verse recounting his stay on Baffin Island
- A. J. M. Smith:
  - Editor, A Book of Modern Canadian Verse, anthology
  - Poems: New and Collected
- Raymond Souster, editor, New Wave Canada anthology of younger poets
- Miriam Waddington, The Glass Trumpet
- George Woodcock, Selected Poems of George Woodcock, Toronto: Clarke, Irwin, Canada

=== Awards ===
- See 1967 Governor General's Awards for a complete list of winners and finalists for those awards.
- Stephen Leacock Award: Richard J. Needham, Needham's Inferno
- Vicky Metcalf Award: John Patrick Gillese

=== Film ===
- Norman Jewison's In the Heat of the Night premieres
- Michael Snow's Wavelength premieres and starts the structural film movement.

== Sport ==
- March 11 – The Toronto Varsity Blues win their second University Cup by defeating the Laurentian Voyageurs 16 to 2. The final game is played at Edmonton Gardens
- May 2 – The Toronto Maple Leafs win their 13th (and last as of 2024) Stanley Cup by defeating the Montreal Canadiens 4-2 in the 1967 Stanley Cup Finals. The deciding game 6 was played at Maple Leaf Gardens in Toronto, Ontario. Dave Keon of Noranda, Quebec, won the Conn Smythe Trophy as the most valuable player in the playoffs, largely for his defensive play. This would mark the end of the National Hockey League (NHL)'s Original Six era.
- May 11 – The Ontario Hockey Association's Toronto Marlboros win their fifth Memorial Cup by defeating the Thunder Bay Junior Hockey League's Port Arthur Marrs 4 games to 1. All the games were played at Fort William Gardens
- July 23 – The fifth Pan American Games commence in Winnipeg.
- November 25 – The Alberta Golden Bears win their first Vanier Cup by defeating the McMaster Marauders 10–9 in the 3rd Vanier Cup played at Varsity Stadium in Toronto
- December 2 – The Hamilton Tiger-Cats win their fifth Grey Cup by defeating Saskatchewan Roughriders 24 to 1 in the 55th Grey Cup played at Lansdowne Park in Ottawa.

== Births ==
=== January to March ===
- January 27 – Susan Aglukark, singer-songwriter
- January 29 – Sean Burke, ice hockey player
- February 26 – Gene Principe, sports reporter
- March 16 – Kevin Draxinger, swimmer

=== April to June ===
- April 5 – Gary Gait, lacrosse player
- April 5 – Paul Gait, lacrosse player and coach
- April 6
  - Kathleen Barr, voice actor
  - Ralf Socher, alpine skier
- April 14
  - Steve Chiasson, Canadian ice hockey player (d. 1999)
  - Alain Côté, Canadian ice hockey player
- April 29 – Curtis Joseph, ice hockey player
- May 1 – Tom Hanson, photojournalist (d. 2009)
- May 1 – Marie Moore, swimmer
- May 3 - Kenny Hotz, Canadian comedy writer and television personality
- May 4 – John Child, beach volleyball player and Olympic bronze medalist
- May 5 – Stephane Provost, National Hockey League linesman (d. 2005)
- May 10 – Scott Brison, politician and Minister
- May 15 – Ron Pardo, actor and comedian
- May 21 – Chris Benoit, wrestler (d. 2007)
- May 25 – Andrew Sznajder, tennis player
- May 29 – Mike Keane, ice hockey player
- June 1 – Murray Baron, ice hockey player
- June 10 – Elizabeth Wettlaufer, nurse and serial killer
- June 24 – Bill Huard, ice hockey player
- June 27 – Sylvie Fréchette, synchronized swimmer and Olympic gold medalist
- June 28 – Gil Bellows, film and television actor
- June 30 – Gareth Rees, rugby union player

=== July to December ===
- July 1 – Pamela Anderson, actress, glamour model, producer, author and activist
- July 7 – Andy Walker, television personality
- July 12 – Bruny Surin, sprinter, Olympic gold medalist and World Champion
- August 6 – Julie Snyder, TV host and producer
- August 12 – Pascale Grand, racewalker
- August 21 – Carrie-Anne Moss, actress
- August 23 – Jody Vance, sports anchor
- September 1 – David Whissell, politician
- September 17 – Kevin Boyles, volleyball player and coach
- September 25 – Kim Issel, Canadian ice hockey player
- September 30 –
  - Paul Boyd, American-born Canadian animator (d. 2007)
  - Andrea Roth, actress
- October 3 – Denis Villeneuve, film director and writer
- October 9 – Carling Bassett-Seguso, tennis player
- October 9 – Guylaine Dumont, beach volleyball player
- October 17 – Venus Terzo, actress and voice actress
- October 30 – Brad Aitken, ice hockey player
- November 8 – Christopher Chalmers, swimmer
- December 14 – Dominic LeBlanc, politician
- December 15 – Christine Larsen, synchronised swimmer
- December 16 – Donovan Bailey, sprinter, double Olympic gold medalist and World Champion
- December 17 – Vincent Damphousse, ice hockey player
- December 29 – Ashleigh Banfield, journalist and television host

== Deaths ==
- January 9 – Errick Willis, politician (b.1896)
- January 14 – James Lorimer Ilsley, politician, Minister and jurist (b.1894)
- January 26 – Crawford Gordon, businessman (b.1914)
- January 31 – Geoffrey O'Hara, composer, singer and music professor (b.1882)
- February 10 – Thomas Ricketts, soldier and Victoria Cross recipient in 1918 (b.1901)
- February 25 – Francis Carroll, Canadian Roman Catholic prelate, bishop of Calgary (1935–1966) (b. 1890)
- March 5 – Georges Vanier, soldier, diplomat and Governor General of Canada (b.1888)
- March 23 - Jack Humphrey, painter (b.1901)
- April 20 - Léo-Paul Desrosiers, journalist, writer (b.1896)
- April 30 – Gladys Porter, politician and first female Member of the Legislative Assembly of Nova Scotia (b.1894)
- May 13 – Dana Porter, politician and jurist (b.1901)
- May 23 – Lionel Groulx, priest, historian, Quebec nationalist and traditionalist (b.1878)
- August 2 – Adrien Arcand, journalist and fascist (b.1899)
- August 28 - Charles Edward Bothwell, politician and barrister (b.1882)
- December 30 – Vincent Massey, lawyer, diplomat and Governor General of Canada (b.1887)

=== Full date unknown ===
- Malcolm Norris, Métis leader (b.1900)

== See also ==
- 1967 in Canadian television
- List of Canadian films

== Bibliography ==
- Berton, Pierre (1997). 1967: The Last Good Year. Toronto: Doubleday Canada Ltd. ISBN 978-0-385-25662-9.
