= 1967 in Canadian television =

The following is a list of events affecting Canadian television in 1967. Events listed include television show debuts, finales, cancellations, and channel launches, closures and rebrandings.

== Events ==
Date	Event
April 27	The Expo 67 opening ceremonies air on CBC, and all around the world. An estimated 700 million people watched in over 70 countries.
July 23	Coverage of the 1967 Pan American Games begins airing on CBC.
September 23	The 1967 Canadian Film Awards.

=== Debuts ===
Show	Station	Premiere Date
Mr. Dressup	CBC Television	February 13
O'Keefe Centre Presents	CBC Television	October 16
Man Alive	CBC Television	Unknown
The Pig and Whistle	CTV	Unknown
Question Period	CTV	Unknown

=== Ending this year ===
Show	Station	Cancelled
Butternut Square	CBC Television	February 10
Canada 98	CBC Television	April 16
Music Hop	CBC Television	June 28
20/20	CBC Television	September 24
Camera West	CBC Television	September 24
Cariboo Country	CBC Television	Unknown

== Television shows ==
=== 1950s ===
- Country Canada (1954–2007)
- CBC News Magazine (1952–1981)
- Chez Hélène (1959–1973)
- Circle 8 Ranch (1955–1978)
- Don Messer's Jubilee (1957–1969)
- The Friendly Giant (1958–1985)
- Hockey Night in Canada (1952–present)
- The National (1954–present)
- Front Page Challenge (1957–1995)
- Wayne and Shuster Show (1958–1989)

=== 1960s ===
- CTV National News (1961–present)
- Elwood Glover's Luncheon Date (1963–1975)
- Flashbook (1962–1968)
- Land and Sea (1964–present)
- Let's Go (1964–1968)
- Magistrate's Court (1963–1969)
- Music Hop (1962–1972)
- The Nature of Things (1960–present, scientific documentary series)
- People in Conflict (1962–1970)
- The Pierre Berton Show (1962–1973)
- Quentin Durgens, M.P. (1965–1969)
- Reach for the Top (1961–1985)
- Rocket Robin Hood (1966–1969)
- Singalong Jubilee (1961–1974)
- Take 30 (1962–1983)
- Telescope (1963–1973)
- The Tommy Hunter Show (1965–1992)
- University of the Air (1966–1983)
- W-FIVE (1966–present, newsmagazine program)
- Wojeck (1966–1968)

== Television stations ==
=== Debuts ===
Date	Market	Station	Channel	Affiliation	Notes/References
Unknown	Yellowknife, Northwest Territories	CFYK-TV	8	CBC Television (O&O)	First television station in Canada's northern territories

== Births ==
Date	Name	Notability
February 26	James Allodi	Actor
December 27	Saffron Henderson	Voice actress

== See also ==
- 1967 in Canada
- List of Canadian films
