= 1964 in Canadian television =

The following is a list of events affecting Canadian television in 1964. Events listed include television show debuts, finales, cancellations, and channel launches, closures and rebrandings.

== Events ==
| Date | Event |
|---|---|
| October 4 | CBC launches CBNT as its Newfoundland affiliate. CJON-TV, a former CBC Newfoundland affiliate, joins CTV. |
| October 4 | CKCO becomes the second CBC affiliate to join CTV this year. |
| October 4 | Long-running documentary series Land and Sea begins airing on CBNT. Later the show launches nationwide. |
| October 4 | This Hour Has Seven Days premieres, one of the most controversial news shows in CBC history. |

=== Debuts ===
| Show | Station | Premiere Date |
|---|---|---|
| Let's Go | CBC Television | July 17 |
| Wide World of Sports | CTV | September 19 |
| Cariboo Country | CBC Television | September 28 |
| Camera West | CBC Television | July 1 |
| This Hour Has Seven Days | CBC Television | October 4 |
| Butternut Square | CBC Television | October 19 |
| Canada 98 | CBC Television | November 25 |

=== Ending this year ===
| Show | Station | Cancelled |
|---|---|---|
| A Kin to Win | CTV | May |
| Scarlett Hill | CBC Television | June 8 |
| Mr. Piper | CBC Television | June 8 |
| To Tell the Truth | CTV | July 6 |

=== Births ===
| Date | Name | Notability |
|---|---|---|
| April 12 | Mark Camacho | Actor, voice actor |
| July 23 | Simon B. Nicholson | Screenwriter |
| September 2 | Keanu Reeves | Actor |
| October 14 | David Kaye | Actor, voice actor |
| October 24 | Linda Ballantyne | Voice actress |

== Television shows ==
=== 1950s ===
- Country Canada (1954–2007)
- CBC News Magazine (1952–1981)
- Chez Hélène (1959–1973)
- Circle 8 Ranch (1955–1978)
- Don Messer's Jubilee (1957–1969)
- The Friendly Giant (1958–1985)
- Hockey Night in Canada (1952–present)
- The National (1954–present)
- Front Page Challenge (1957–1995)
- Wayne and Shuster Show (1958–1989)

=== 1960s ===
- 20/20 (1962–1967)
- CTV National News (1961–present)
- Elwood Glover's Luncheon Date (1963–1975)
- The Forest Rangers (1963–1965)
- Flashbook (1962–1968)
- The Littlest Hobo (1963–1965)
- Magistrate's Court (1963–1969)
- Music Hop (1962–1972)
- The Nature of Things (1960–present, scientific documentary series)
- People in Conflict (1962–1970)
- The Pierre Berton Show (1962–1973)
- Razzle Dazzle (1961–1966)
- Reach for the Top (1961–1985)
- Singalong Jubilee (1961–1974)
- Take 30 (1962–1983)
- Take a Chance (1961–1965)
- Telepoll (1961–1965)
- Telescope (1963–1973)

== Television stations ==
=== Debuts ===
| Date | Market | Station | Channel | Affiliation | Notes/References |
|---|---|---|---|---|---|
| September 3 | Quebec City, Quebec | CBVT | 11 | Radio-Canada (O&O) | |
| October 4 | St. John's, Newfoundland and Labrador | CBNT | 8 | CBC Television (O&O) | |

=== Network affiliation changes ===
| Date | Market | Station | Channel | Old affiliation | New affiliation | Source |
|---|---|---|---|---|---|---|
| September 7 | Quebec City, Quebec | CFCM-TV | 4 | Radio-Canada | Independent | |
| October 4 | Kitchener, Ontario | CKCO-TV | 13 | CBC Television | CTV | |
| October 4 | St. John's, Newfoundland and Labrador | CJON-TV | 6 | CBC Television | CTV | |

== See also ==
- 1964 in television
- 1964 in Canada
- 1964 in Canadian music
