= Rod McDonald =

Rod or Rodney McDonald may refer to:

- Rod McDonald (footballer, born 1967), English football striker
- Rod McDonald (footballer, born 1992), English football defender
- Rod McDonald (typographer), see Cartier (typeface)
- Rodney McDonald (director), director of the 1992 film Night Eyes 2
- Rodney McDonald (speedway rider), Australian motorcycle racer at the 2013 Team Long Track World Championship

== See also ==
- Rod MacDonald (born 1948), American singer-songwriter, novelist, and educator
