= Confederation Garden Court =

Plaza in Victoria, British Columbia, Canada

- Public square
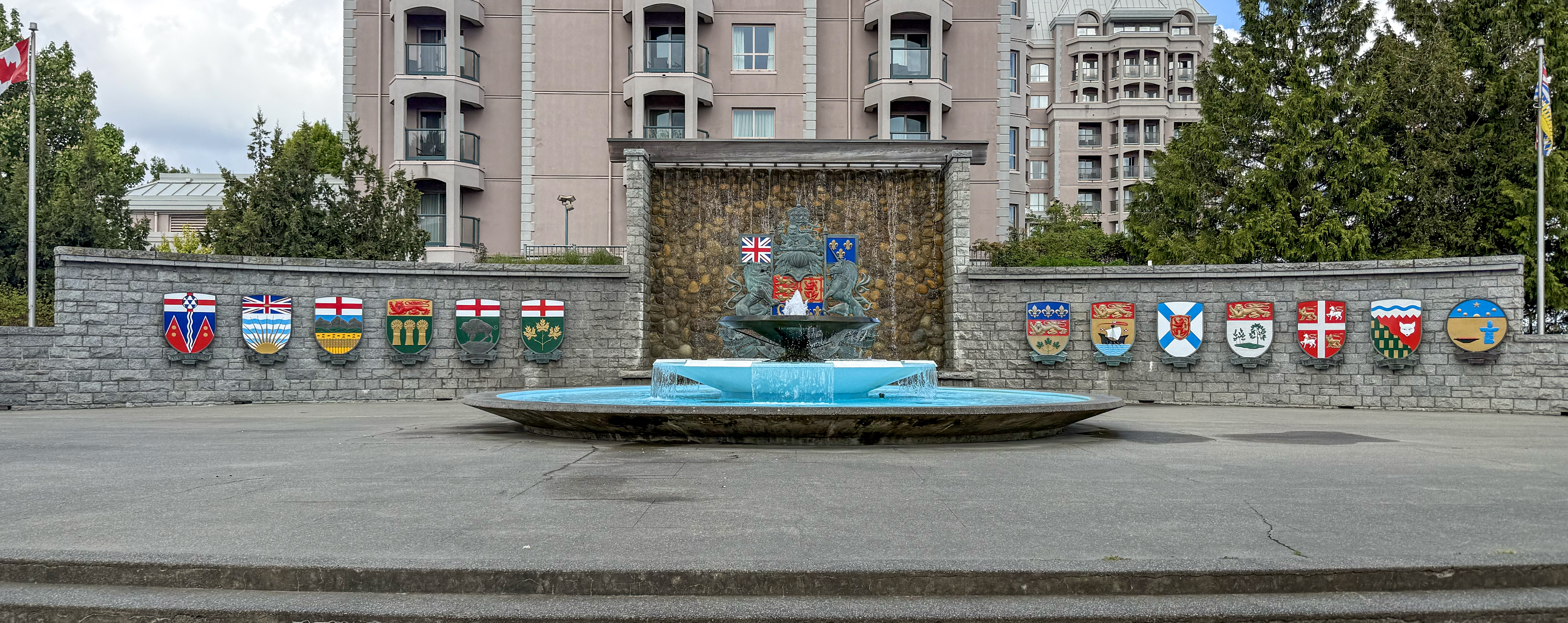
- The plaza in 2026
- Features: British Columbia Time Capsule, Confederation Fountain
- Completed: 1967
- Surface: Concrete
- Dedicated to: Canadian Centennial
- Location: Victoria, British Columbia
- Interactive map of Confederation Garden Court
- Coordinates: 48.42046°N 123.37171°W

Confederation Garden Court is a plaza in Victoria, British Columbia, completed in 1967 to commemorate the Canadian Centennial of confederation. The plaza features the British Columbia Time Capsule and Confederation Fountain, and is maintained by the Legislative Assembly of British Columbia. It has all the shields of the provinces and territories .

== See also ==
- Canadian Confederation
