= Vive le Québec libre =

Slogan from a 1967 de Gaulle speech in Montreal

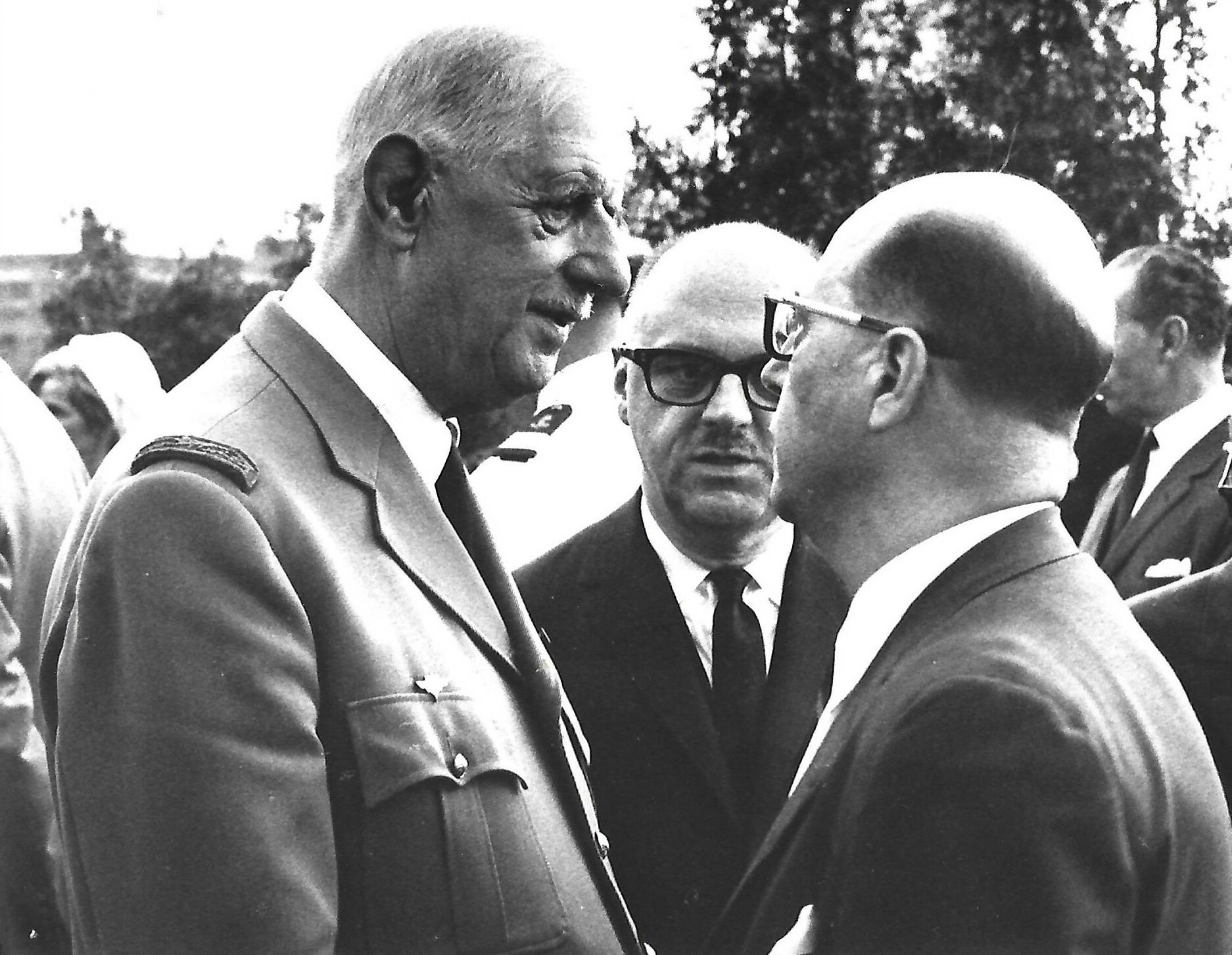
French President Charles de Gaulle shortly after giving the “Vive le Québec libre” speech. In the background, Mayor of Montreal Jean Drapeau.

"Vive le Québec libre !" (French: [viv lə ke.bɛk libʁ], 'Long live free Quebec!') was a phrase in a speech delivered by French president Charles de Gaulle in Montreal, Quebec on July 24, 1967, during an official visit to Canada for the Expo 67 world's fair. While giving an address to a large crowd from a balcony at Montreal City Hall, he uttered "Vive Montréal ! Vive le Québec !" ("Long live Montreal! Long live Quebec!") and then added, followed by loud applause, "Vive le Québec libre !" ("Long live free Quebec!") with particular emphasis on the word libre. The phrase, a slogan used by Quebecers who favoured Quebec sovereignty, was seen as giving his support to the movement.

The speech caused a diplomatic incident with the Government of Canada and was condemned by Canadian prime minister Lester B. Pearson, saying that "Canadians do not need to be liberated". In France, though many were sympathetic to the cause of Quebec nationalism, de Gaulle's speech was criticized as a breach of protocol.

== Background ==
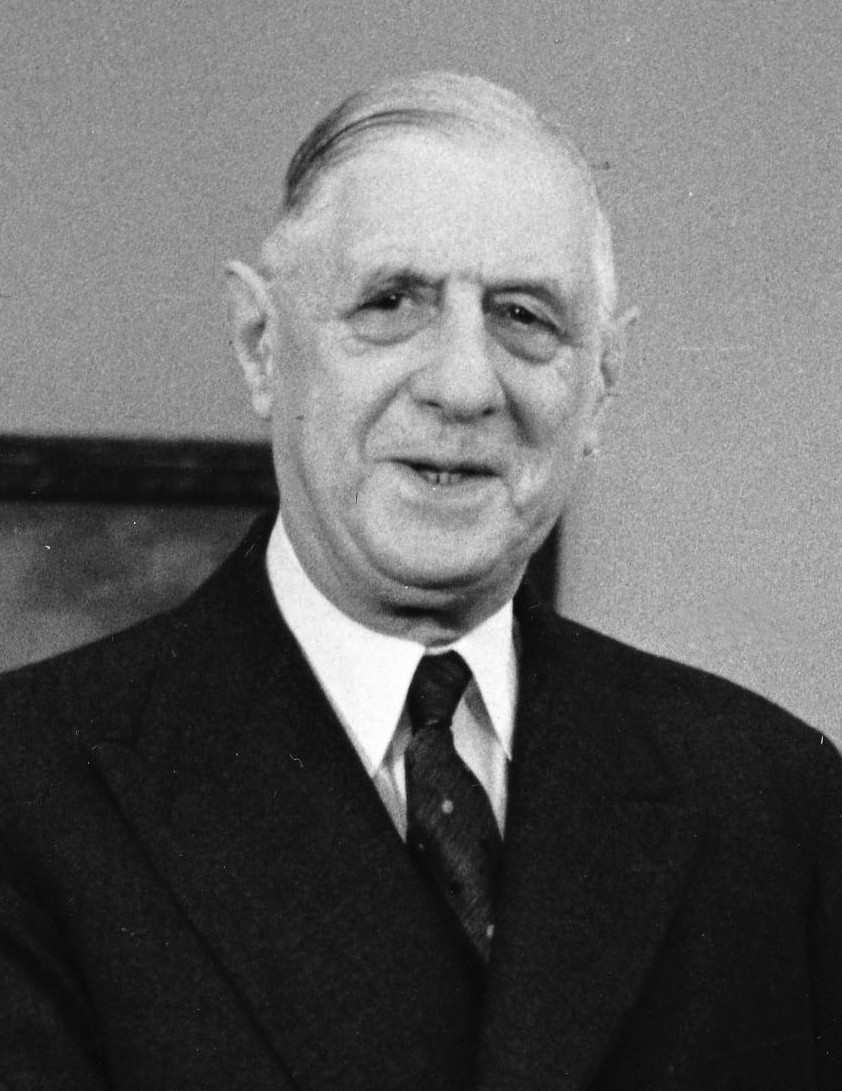
Charles de Gaulle, 1963

Even before his arrival, the Canadian federal government had expressed concern over President Charles de Gaulle’s planned visit. Earlier in 1967, the French government had not sent a high-level representative to the funeral of the Governor General of Canada, Georges Vanier. This attracted notice in Canada, as Vanier and his wife, Pauline, had been personal friends of de Gaulle since 1940, when the latter was in exile in London, England. In April, de Gaulle also did not attend the 50th anniversary ceremonies commemorating the Canadian victory at Vimy Ridge. Concerned about potential French interference in domestic affairs, the Canadian Secretary of State for External Affairs, Paul Martin, visited de Gaulle in Paris in an attempt to improve bilateral relations. The Montreal Gazette speculated in 2012—45 years after the event—that de Gaulle may have still harbored resentment over a perceived slight from Prime Minister Mackenzie King's delayed recognition of the postwar French government in 1944.

In the spring of 1966, as part of diplomatic protocols for Expo 67, de Gaulle and other world leaders whose countries had exhibits at the fair were invited to visit Canada during 1967. A few months later, de Gaulle received a separate invitation from Quebec premier Daniel Johnson to visit the province. According to protocol, a visiting head of state would normally arrive in the national capital of Ottawa. Instead, de Gaulle traveled via the French navy’s Mediterranean flagship, the cruiser Colbert, to the French islands of Saint-Pierre and Miquelon before arriving in Quebec City, the capital city of the province of Quebec. There, he was enthusiastically received, while the new Governor General, Roland Michener, was reportedly booed when the viceregal salute was played upon his arrival. In his speech, de Gaulle discussed France’s “evolving” relationship with Quebec, alluding to support for Quebec sovereignty.

=== French motivations ===
By the early 1960s, the slogan Vive le Québec libre! had already been used by separatist groups such as the Rassemblement pour l'indépendance nationale (RIN) and the Front de libération du Québec (FLQ).

De Gaulle privately supported Quebec independence. In April 1963, he told French Information Minister Alain Peyrefitte: "One day or another, Quebec will be free." Historian Édouard Baraton suggests that de Gaulle regarded French Canadians as part of the broader French nation and felt a responsibility to support their political emancipation from what he viewed as subjugation since the British Conquest of 1760.

Some sources also cite strategic considerations, including potential access to Quebec’s uranium deposits for France’s nuclear program.

=== Diplomatic tensions between Paris and Ottawa ===
Bilateral relations were already strained. De Gaulle refused to send centennial greetings for Canada’s 1967 Confederation anniversary, privately rejecting celebrations of a state “founded on our former defeat". France also did not send senior representatives to the 50th anniversary commemorations of the Battle of Vimy Ridge.

=== Daniel Johnson's official visit to Paris ===
Elected Quebec premier in June 1966, Daniel Johnson Sr. sought either constitutional recognition of Quebec as one of Canada’s two founding nations or, failing that, independence. In May 1967, he visited Paris and was received with full state honors. The discussions reportedly included constitutional reform, with Johnson seeking de Gaulle’s support for Quebec’s position.

== The 1967 visit ==
=== Voyage aboard the Colbert and arrival in Quebec City ===
To bypass protocol requiring a first stop in Ottawa, de Gaulle traveled by sea aboard the cruiser Colbert, arriving in Quebec City on 23 July 1967. He was welcomed by Premier Daniel Johnson and Governor General Roland Michener. Speaking to a crowd at Quebec City Hall, de Gaulle remarked, “One feels at home here, after all!"

=== Journey along the Chemin du Roy ===
On 24 July, de Gaulle and Johnson traveled by motorcade along the historic Chemin du Roy toward Montreal, making stops in several towns. Wearing his brigadier-general’s uniform, de Gaulle made brief remarks emphasizing Quebec’s self-determination. At Donnacona, he told the crowd, “You are a piece of the French people... Your French-Canadian people must depend only on itself."

== Speech ==
Before boarding the Colbert, de Gaulle told Xavier Deniau, “They will hear me over there, it will make waves!" He also confided to his son-in-law General Alain de Boissieu that “I am going to strike a strong blow. Things are going to get hot. But it is necessary. It is the last chance to rectify the cowardice of France."

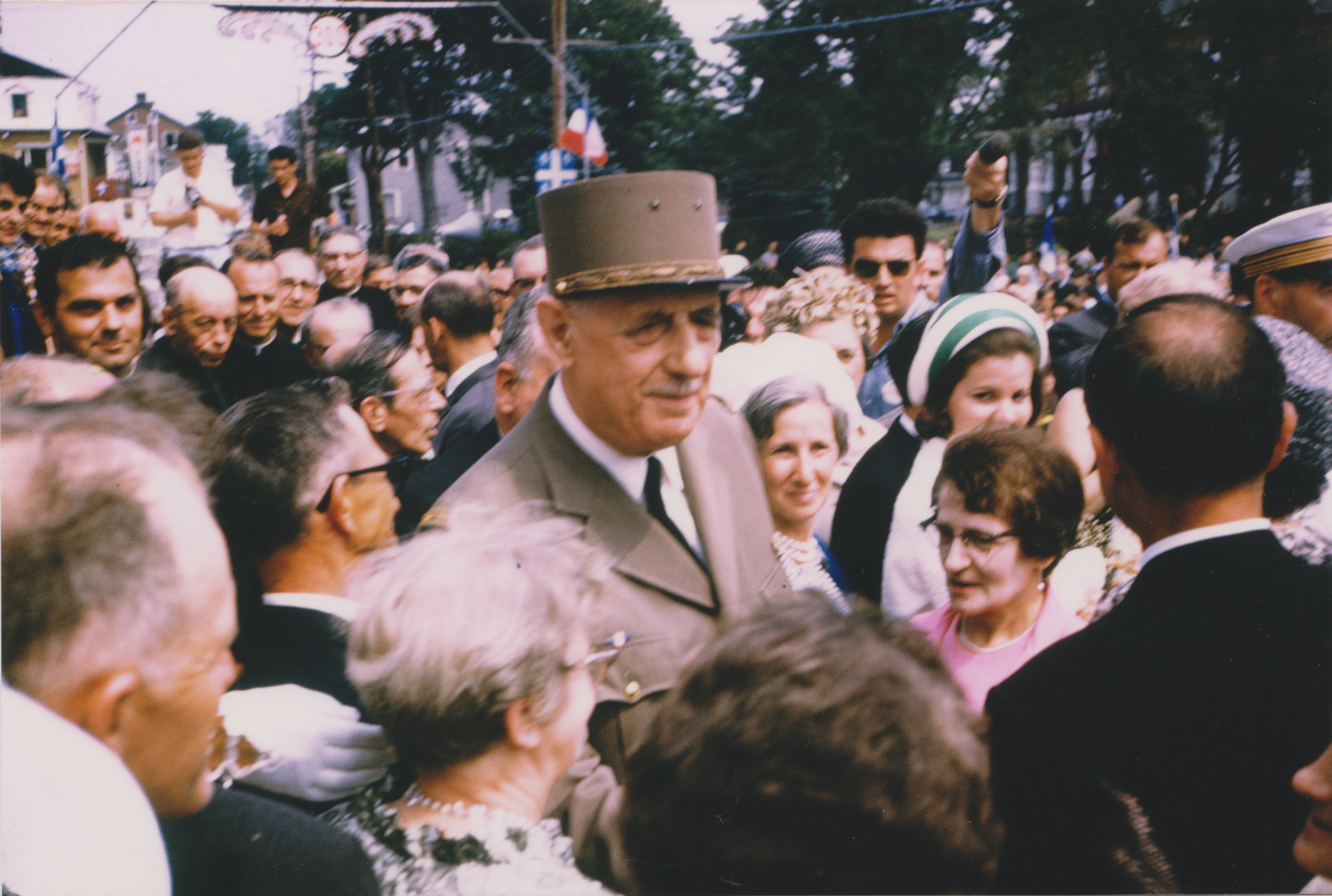
General de Gaulle on the Chemin du Roy, Sainte-Anne-de-la-Pérade, 1967

On July 24, upon reaching Montreal, de Gaulle was driven to Montreal City Hall, where Mayor Jean Drapeau and Premier Johnson were present. Although he was not scheduled to speak, the crowd chanted for him. He informed Drapeau, “I have to speak to those people who are calling for me.” According to scholar Dale C. Thomson, based on interviews with high-ranking French officials and contemporaneous documents, de Gaulle’s statement had been pre-planned and was delivered when the opportunity arose.

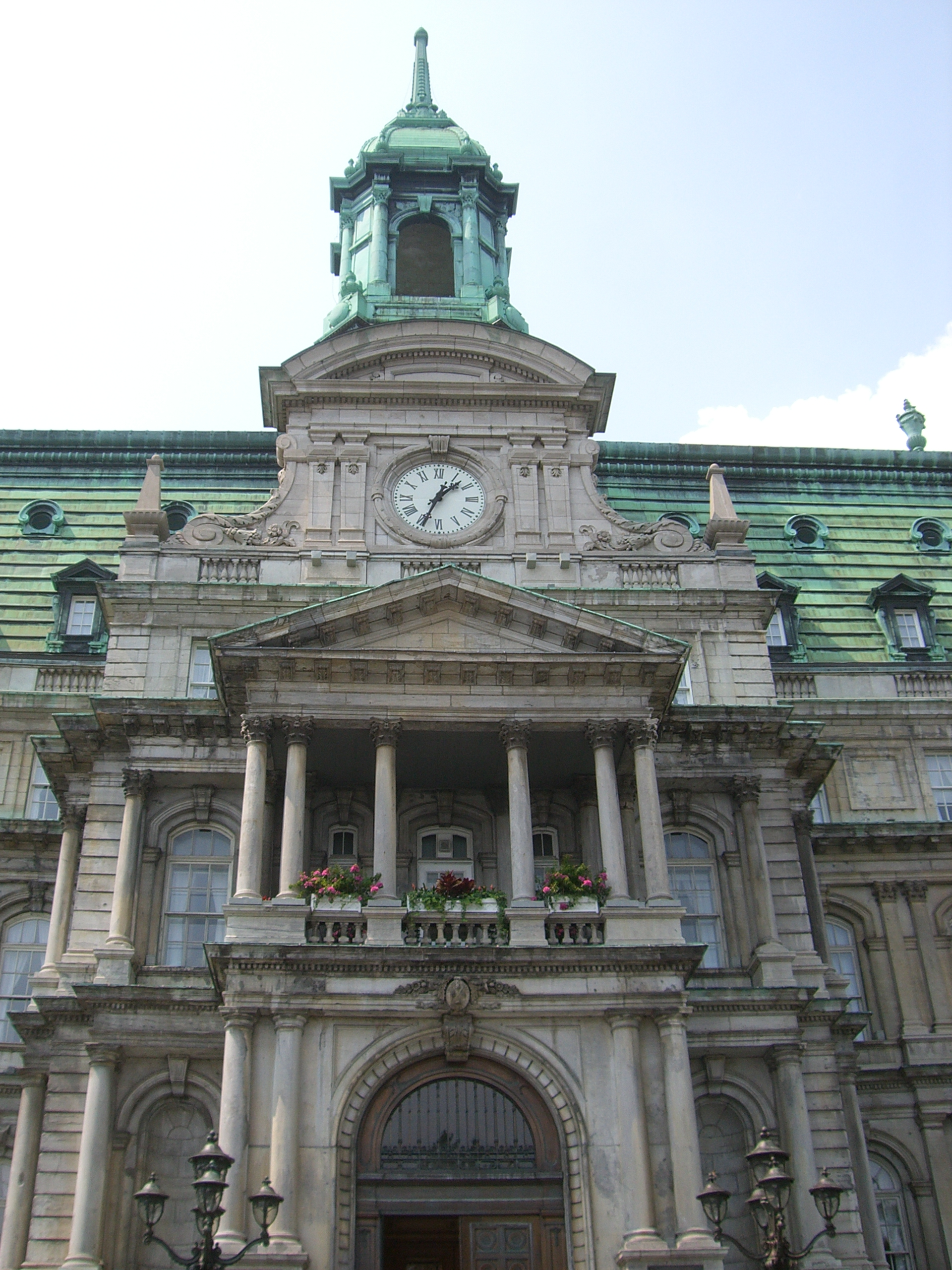
Montreal City Hall's balcony where De Gaulle gave his speech.

De Gaulle addressed the assembled crowd from a balcony, with the speech broadcast live on radio. He remarked that the sight of cheering crowds along the banks of the Saint Lawrence River reminded him of his triumphant return to Paris following its Liberation from Nazi Germany. The speech appeared to conclude with the words "Vive Montréal ! Vive le Québec !" ("Long live Montreal! Long live Quebec!"), but he then added, "Vive le Québec libre ! Vive, vive, vive le Canada français ! Et vive la France !" ("Long live free Quebec! Long live, long live, long live French Canada! And long live France!"), whereupon the crowd roared with approval, especially after hearing, "Vive le Québec libre !".

== Reaction ==
De Gaulle’s statement was widely regarded as a serious breach of diplomatic protocol. It emboldened the Quebec sovereignty movement and heightened tensions between the governments of Canada and France. The crowd’s enthusiastic response to de Gaulle’s phrase was emotional, and many English Canadians reacted with outrage, interpreting it as a threat to Canada’s territorial integrity. Canadian prime minister Lester B. Pearson formally rebuked de Gaulle in a statement delivered to the French Embassy on 25 July 1967, which was also read on national television that evening. Pearson stated, “The people of Canada are free. Every province in Canada is free. Canadians do not need to be liberated. Indeed, many thousands of Canadians gave their lives in two world wars in the liberation of France and other European countries."

The speech provoked a media and diplomatic uproar, prompting de Gaulle to cut short his visit to Canada. On the day following the address, he visited Expo 67 and hosted a banquet at the French pavilion. On 26 July, rather than continuing on to Ottawa for a scheduled meeting with Prime Minister Pearson, de Gaulle returned to France aboard a French military jet.Pierre Trudeau, newly appointed Canadian Minister of Justice, publicly speculated on how France might have reacted if a Canadian Prime Minister had made a comparable statement, such as "Brittany to the Bretons". De Gaulle reportedly remained unimpressed by Trudeau, stating "Nous n'avons aucune concession, ni même aucune amabilité, à faire à M. Trudeau, qui est l'adversaire de la chose française au Canada." ("We have not one concession, nor even any courtesy, to extend to Mr. Trudeau, who is the adversary of the French cause in Canada.") De Gaulle also faced criticism from much of the French media for breaching international protocol, including commentary in Le Monde.

Among members of the Quebec sovereignty movement, the speech was seen as a pivotal moment. Coming shortly after the Quiet Revolution and amid the low economic and political status of French Canadians at the time, de Gaulle’s endorsement appeared to confer legitimacy on the movement for many, including future Quebec premier René Lévesque.

On the flight back to France, de Gaulle reportedly told his diplomatic counsellor René de Saint-Légier de la Saussaye that the event represented “a historical phenomenon that was perhaps foreseeable but it took a form that only the situation itself could determine. Of course, like many others I could have got away with a few polite remarks or diplomatic acrobatics, but when one is General de Gaulle, one does not have recourse to such expedients. What I did, I had to do it."

== Aftermath ==
De Gaulle’s visit and speech triggered an unprecedented diplomatic crisis between France and Canada. The federal Canadian government accused the French president of interfering in Canada’s internal affairs. Bilateral relations remained tense and did not significantly improve until after de Gaulle’s resignation in 1969.

In February 1969, de Gaulle visited Brittany. During a speech in Quimper, he recited a stanza of a poem written by his uncle, also named Charles de Gaulle, in the Breton language, expressing devotion to Breton culture. The address followed a period of government crackdowns on Breton nationalism, and de Gaulle had been criticized for double standards: advocating Quebec independence while suppressing Breton nationalist movements. In response, he stated that Brittany was free and had been liberated by Bretons and other French forces during World War II.

== Legacy ==
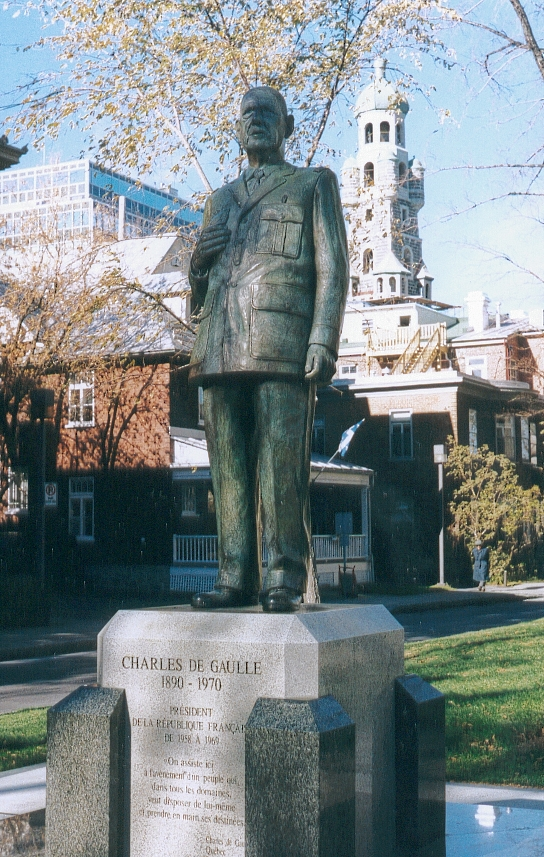
Statue of General de Gaulle in Quebec, Cours du Général de Montcalm.

A statue of de Gaulle was unveiled in Quebec in July 1997, marking the thirtieth anniversary of his 1967 visit. The plinth bears an inscription excerpted from a speech he delivered at an official dinner the evening before his appearance on the balcony at Montreal City Hall:

Charles de Gaulle (1890-1970) Président de la République française de 1958 à 1969
On assiste ici à l’avènement d’un peuple qui dans tous les domaines veut disposer de lui-même et prendre en main ses destinées. (Here we witness the rise of a people who desire to be in complete control of their interests with full responsibility for their own destiny.)

— Charles de Gaulle, Québec, le 23 juillet 1967

== See also ==
- Canada–France relations
- Gaullism
- History of Quebec
- List of speeches
- Quiet Revolution
- Rassemblement pour l'Indépendance Nationale
- Quebec sovereignty movement#France

== Bibliography ==
- Berton, Pierre (1997). 1967: The Last Good Year. Toronto: Doubleday Canada. ISBN 0-385-25662-0.
- Busby, Brian (2008). Great Canadian Speeches: Words: Words that Shaped a Nation. London: Capella. ISBN 978-1-84193-957-5.
- Ellis, Peter Berresford (1993). The Celtic Dawn: A History of Pan Celticism. London: Constable.
- Peyrefitte, Alain (2000). C'était de Gaulle, tome 3 (in French). Paris: éditions de Fallois-Fayard. ISBN 9782213644912.
- Taillez, Felix de (2011). »Amour sacré de la Patrie« – de Gaulle in Neufrankreich. Symbolik, Rhetorik und Geschichtskonzept seiner Reden in Québec 1967 (in German and French). Munich: Utz. ISBN 978-3-8316-4073-7.
- Thomson, Dale C. (1988). Vive le Québec Libre. Toronto: Deneau Publishers. ISBN 0-88879-151-8.
