= Centennial Voyageur Canoe Pageant =

1967 canoe race

- Start of race at Rocky Mountain House. Photograph by Frank Grant.

Event information
- Type: canoe race
- Race area: Rocky Mountains to Montreal
- Dates: May 24, 1967 - September 4, 1967
- Nations: Canada
- Distance: 5,283 kilometers

The Centennial Voyageur Canoe Pageant was a canoe race started on May 24, 1967 in the Rocky Mountains by ten teams representing eight provinces and the Yukon Territory and Northwest Territories. Prince Edward Island and Newfoundland, the two remaining provinces were not entered. 3,283 miles (5,283 km) were paddled and portaged in 104 days by 100 men using six man shifts per team. They arrived in Montreal on September 4. Other privately sponsored canoes from across the country made similar trips. As of March 2012, it still holds the Guinness record for longest canoeing race in history.

== Beginnings ==
The Centennial Commission was started in 1963, with the mandate of organizing numerous projects to promote the first Canadian Centennial. Regional governments advertised for participants. Every man that officially completed the trip would receive $1000 (CDN$9,072 in 2025 dollars). The winning team an additional $1,500 per man and $500 for 2nd/3rd. There were other contests along the route as well.

== The canoes ==
Twelve canoes were built for promotion and trials in 1966 by the Chestnut Canoe Company. The 10 canoes used the following year in the race were built by Moise Cadorette.

== The route ==
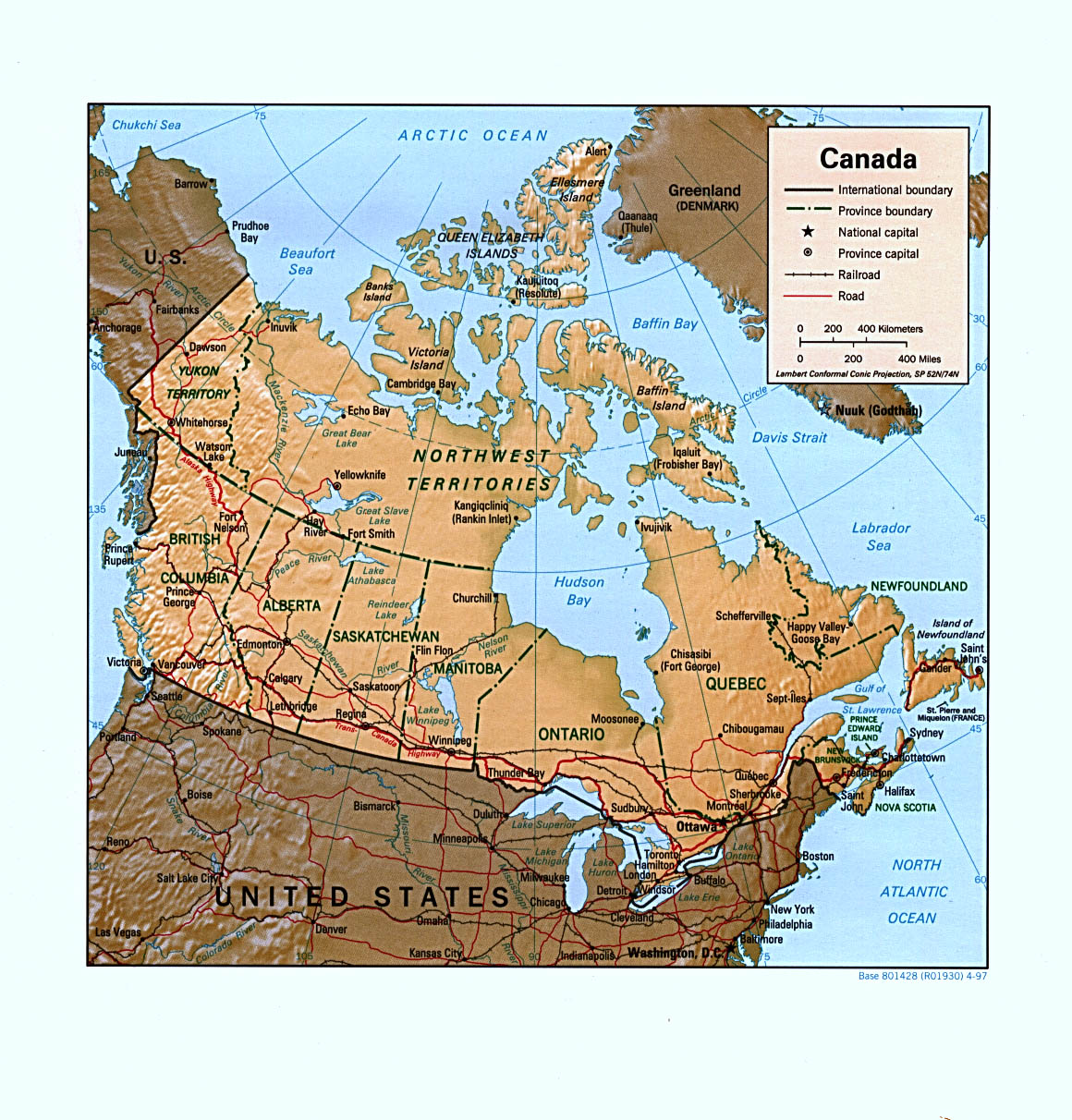
Relief map courtesy of Courtesy of the University of Texas Libraries, Perry–Castañeda Library Map Collection and the Central Intelligence Agency

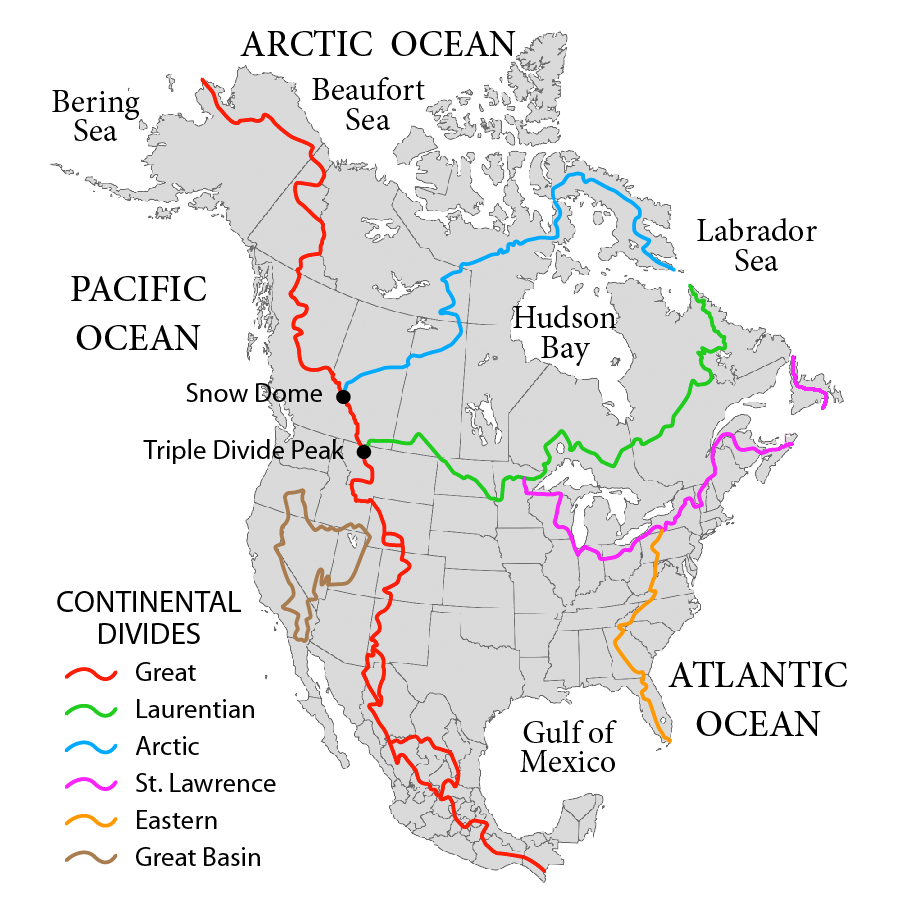
Portages needed to be done over the divides

Expo 67 Official Guide Book Schedule:

- Day 1 Rocky Mountain House – Wed, May 24
- Day 4 Edmonton – May 27
- Day 9 Lloydminster – June 1
- Day 11 North Battleford – June 3
- Day 12 Saskatoon – June 4
- Day 15 Prince Albert – June 7
- Day 18 Nipawin – June 10
- Day 21 The Pas – June 13
- Day 34 Portage la Prairie – June 26
- Day 39 Winnipeg – July 1
- Day 40 Selkirk – July 2
- Day 48 Kenora – July 10
- Day 52 Fort Frances – July 14
- Day 62 Fort William – July 24
- Day 80 Sault Ste. Marie – August 11
- Day 91 North Bay – August 22
- Day 94 Deep River – August 25
- Day 95 Pembroke – August 26
- Day 96 Campbell's Bay, P.Q. – August 27
- Day 97 Arnprior – August 28
- Day 98 Ottawa – August 29
- Day 104 Montreal Expo67 – Fri, September 4

== See also ==
- Expo 67
- Don Starkell
- Hudson's Bay Company forts and trading posts
- Voyageurs

== Books and periodicals ==
- Guilloux, Doreen: Paddling, Portaging & Pageantry: 2007: ISBN 978-0-9782874-0-5
- Dean, Misao: The Centennial Voyageur Canoe Pageant as Historical Re-enactment: Journal of Canadian Studies: Vol 40.3 pp. 43–67: 2006
- Berton, Pierre: 1967: The Last Good Year: Toronto: Doubleday Canada: 1997: ISBN 0-385-25662-0
- Lefebvre, Adrien: An Epic Adventure: Canada's Centennial Voyageur Canoe Pageant cowritten with Valerie Gerwing Lefebvre: 2025: ISBN 978-1-968563-61-5
