= British Columbia Time Capsule =

Coordinates: 48.42039°N 123.37144°W

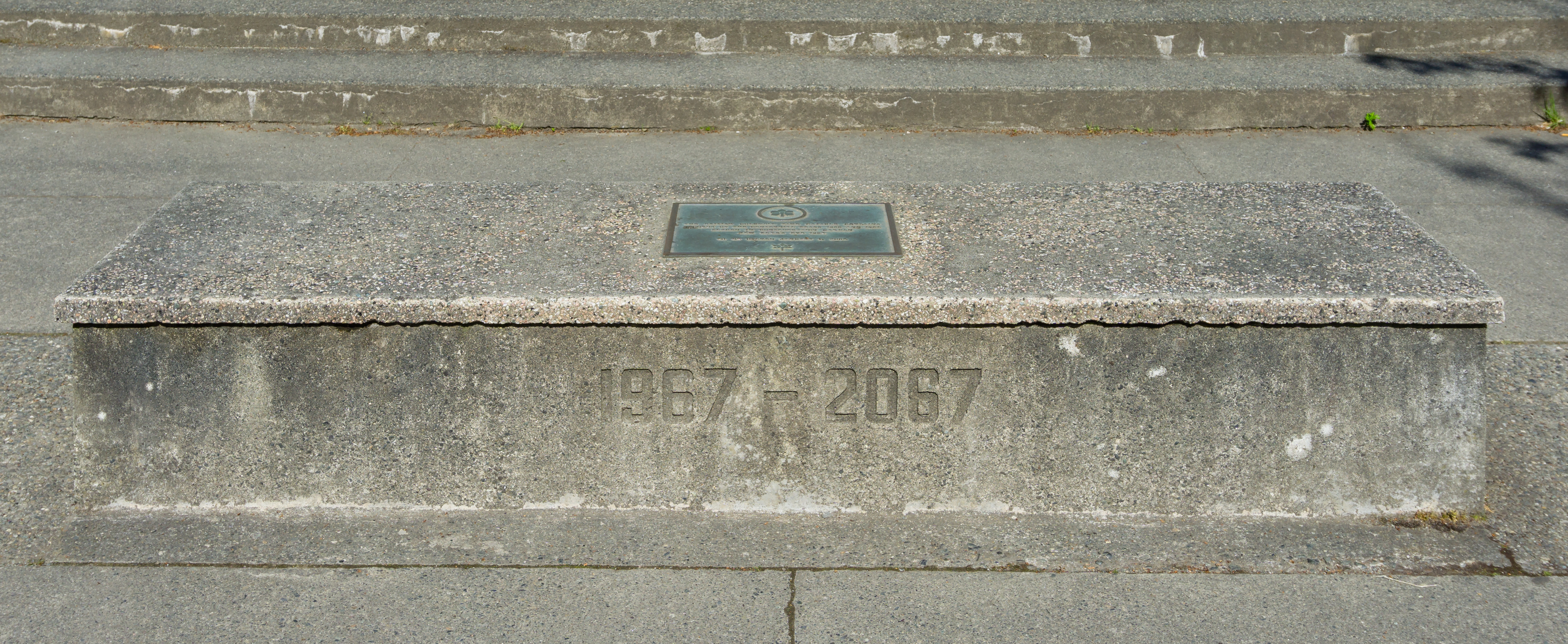
The capsule in Confederation Garden Court, 2018

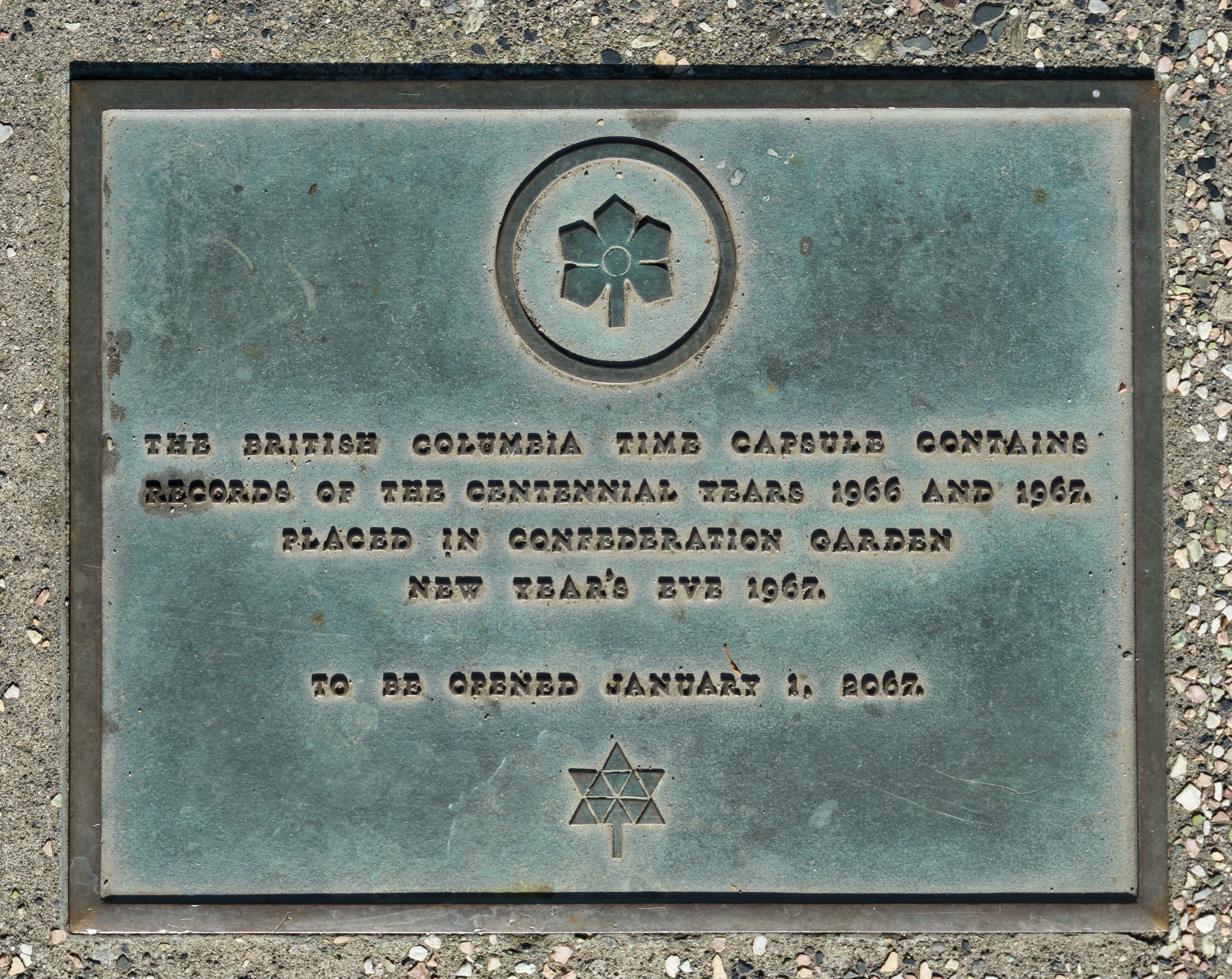
Plaque

The British Columbia Time Capsule is a time capsule in Victoria, British Columbia, containing records from 1966–1967. The capsule was placed in Confederation Garden Court on December 31, 1967, and is scheduled to be opened on January 1, 2067, as part of Canada's bicentennial celebrations.
