= Canadian Centennial =

Centennial of Canada's confederation

Logo of Canada's 1967 centennial celebrations, designed by Stuart Ash

The Canadian Centennial was a yearlong celebration held in 1967 to celebrate the 100th anniversary of Canadian Confederation. Celebrations in Canada occurred throughout the year but culminated on Dominion Day, July 1. Commemorative coins were minted, that were different from typical issues with animals on each — the cent, for instance, had a dove on its reverse. Communities and organizations across Canada were encouraged to engage in centennial projects to celebrate the anniversary. The projects ranged from special one-time events to local improvement projects, such as the construction of municipal arenas and parks. The Centennial Flame was also added to Parliament Hill. Children born in 1967 were declared centennial babies.

== Centennial projects ==
In 1961, Prime Minister John Diefenbaker announced that the federal government would provide funding for the construction of about 860 buildings as centennial projects. Under the Centennial Commission, convened in January 1963, various projects were commissioned to commemorate the year. In 1965, Prime Minister Lester Pearson appointed a committee headed by Ernest Côté to plan events in Ottawa for 1967. The CBC commissioned Gordon Lightfoot to write the song "Canadian Railroad Trilogy" for broadcast on January 1, 1967. The Canadian Government commissioned typographer Carl Dair to create a new and distinctively Canadian typeface. The first proof of Cartier was published as "the first Canadian type for text composition" to mark the centenary of Canadian Confederation.

=== Canadian Armed Forces Tattoo 1967 ===
The Canadian Armed Forces contributed to the celebrations by producing a military tattoo unlike any other in Canadian history. It was formed in Picton, Ontario in February 1967 by members from the three branches of the military providing service personnel at the Picton base for training purposes. The show was produced by Colonel Ian Fraser of the Black Watch and would eventually included 1700 military men and women in a show that would travel across Canada from March to November performing over 150 performances. Some said that Tattoo 1967 was the major event that year, and there were calls to have the Tattoo travel through the U.S., Europe, and even the Soviet Union, but Prime Minister Pearson did not approve the proposal. CBC Television and the National Film Board of Canada filmed the Tattoo, as did the military. Tattoo 1967 was the largest undertaking by the military during peacetime, and has never been reproduced since. The Tattoo depicted the military history of Canada from the first French military and settlers in Canada in 1665 right up to Canada's UN peacekeeping role in 1967.

=== Challenge for Change ===
Challenge for Change (in Quebec Societé Nouvelle) was a participatory film and video project created by the National Film Board of Canada in 1967 as a response to the Centennial. Active until 1980, Challenge for Change used film and video production to illuminate the social concerns of various communities within Canada, with funding from eight different departments of the Canadian government. The impetus for the program was the belief that film and video were useful tools for initiating social change and eliminating poverty.

=== Caribana (Toronto) ===
In Toronto, the Caribana parade and festival was launched in 1967 as a celebration of Caribbean culture, and as a gift from Canada's West Indian community in tribute to the centennial year.

=== Centennial Voyageur Canoe Pageant ===
The Centennial Voyageur Canoe Pageant was a canoe race started on May 24 in the Rocky Mountains by ten teams representing eight provinces and the two territories. Two provinces did not enter. 3,283 miles were paddled and portaged in 104 days by 100 men using six man shifts per team. They arrived in Montreal on September 4. Other privately sponsored canoes from across the country made similar trips.

=== Confederation of Tomorrow ===
In November 1967, the Confederation of Tomorrow conference was held at the newly built Toronto-Dominion Bank Tower. Called by Ontario Premier John Robarts, the summit of provincial premiers led to a new round of federal-provincial negotiations to amend the Canadian Constitution.

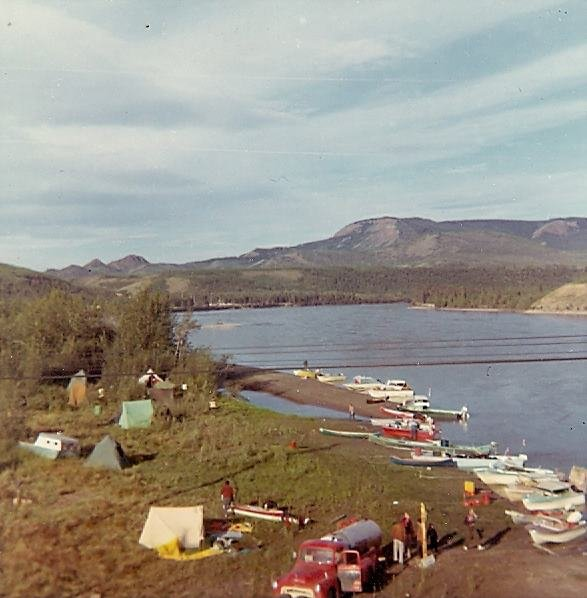
Yukon River Flotilla on August 9 in Carmacks, Yukon

=== Yukon River Flotilla ===
The Yukon River Flotilla was a centennial project organized and sponsored by the Yukon Fish and Game Association. It was a voyage down the Yukon River from Whitehorse to Dawson City commemorating the memory of the Klondike gold-seekers who sailed the Yukon River from Bennett Lake to Dawson City during the Klondike Gold Rush of 1898.

On August 6, 54 craft departed Whitehorse on a ten-day voyage to Dawson carrying 108 adults, 45 children, and 9 dogs. Participants came from four provinces, thirteen states and one European country. They sailed in different types of watercraft to include rubber-rafts, canoes, kayaks, river-boats, power-boats, skiffs, cabin cruisers, and four Amphicars.

=== Other commemorative projects ===
In addition to these major projects there were commemorative projects throughout the country. Municipal funding for approved centennial projects was matched dollar for dollar by both the province and the federal government. Providing a concrete reminder of the centennial celebrations, these projects included the 1,500 seat Norbrock Stadium in Kamloops, British Columbia, the National Arts Centre in Ottawa, the Centennial Building in Fredericton and many others. Approximately $25 million was made available by the Centennial Committee for local projects.

Some projects, such as the Ontario Science Centre, were completed after the 1967 centennial.

== Expo 67 ==
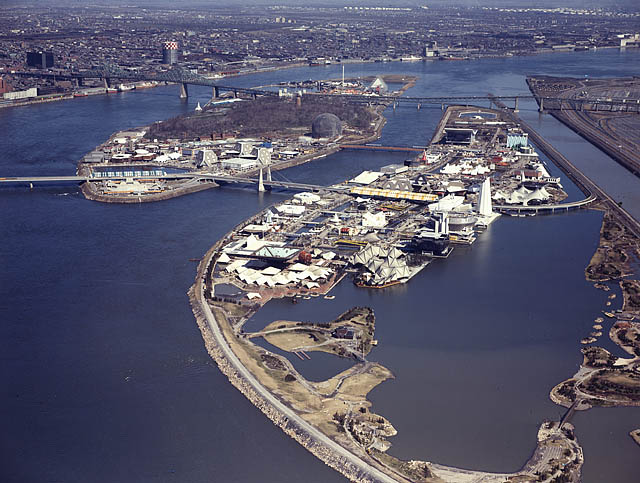
Aerial view of Notre-Dame Island and Île Ste-Hélène at Expo 67, Montreal, Quebec

The 1967 International and Universal Exposition, or Expo 67 as it was commonly known, was the general exhibition, Category One World's Fair held in Montreal from April 27 to October 29. Expo 67 was Canada's main celebration during the centennial.

In a political and cultural context, Expo 67 was seen as a landmark moment in Canadian history. Expo 67 in particular was a signifier of the nation's mood of extreme optimism and confidence on heading into its second century. In retrospect, the centennial is seen as a high point of Canadian aspirations prior to the anxious decade of the 1970s that saw the nation divided over issues relating to inflation, an economic recession, government budget deficits and Quebec separatism. Popular Canadian historian Pierre Berton referred to the centennial as "the last good year" in his book 1967: The Last Good Year.

== Confederation train ==
In 1961, Prime Minister John Diefenbaker proposed a travelling exhibit on a train that would traverse the country and bring exhibits on the history of Canada to the citizens. The train consisted of six exhibit cars and seven cars for staff and equipment pulled by two diesel locomotives, one from each from Canadian Pacific Railway and Canadian National Railway. The locomotives were painted in purple, grey, and black livery and had a custom air horn that sounded the first four notes of "O Canada." The train was inaugurated on January 9 in Victoria and made 83 stops across the country before reaching its final stop in Montreal on December 5.

== Centennial banknote ==
The Bank of Canada issued into circulation a redesigned version of the $1 banknote from the 1954 Series. The image on the reverse of this version shows the original Parliament Buildings, and the obverse includes a green monochrome adaptation of the stylised maple leaf centennial logo marked with the years 1867 and 1967. Two variants of the design were printed; the first had the serial number at the top of the obverse, whereas the second and more common variant had the years 1867 and 1967 printed twice flanking the apex of the coat of arms.

== Centennial Medal ==
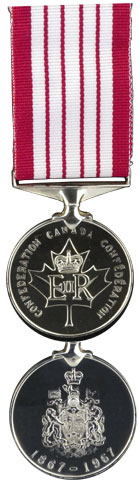
Canadian Centennial Medal (1967)

The Canadian Centennial Medal was issued in 1967 to commemorate the 100th anniversary of the Confederation of Canada, and was awarded to Canadians who were recommended by governments and associations for having provided valuable service to this country. Some 30,000 medals were conferred on Canadians selected from all sectors of society.

== See also ==
- History of Canada
- "Canada (The Centennial Song)"
- 1967 in Canada
- The Canadian Centenary Series
- 125th Anniversary of the Confederation of Canada Medal
- 150th anniversary of Canada
- Centennial Performance
