= Don Starkell =

Canadian adventurer, diarist and author

Don Starkell (December 7, 1932 – January 28, 2012) was a Canadian adventurer, diarist and author, perhaps best known for his achievements in canoeing, in particular, paddling from Winnipeg to the mouth of the Amazon River and by kayak through the Northwest Passage.

Born in Winnipeg, Manitoba, he had a difficult childhood including an abusive father, four and a half years in an orphanage, and later with a foster family in North Kildonan. He took up canoeing in his teens and at age 17 was named Most Outstanding Novice at the Kildonan Canoe Club. He competed professionally as a canoeist, winning 10 out of 12 races that he entered. In 1967, he was a member of the Manitoba team that competed in the Expo 67 Centennial Voyageur Canoe Pageant race from Rocky Mountain House, Alberta to Montreal, Quebec. The team won the race after a gruelling effort lasting 104 days.

Starkell suffered serious burns to his legs, as well as smoke inhalation when a fire broke out in his house in Winnipeg in March, 2010.

== Paddle to the Amazon ==
On June 1, 1980, he and his two sons, Dana and Jeff Starkell, set out on an epic canoe journey from Winnipeg to Belem, Brazil. The trip followed the Red River to its headwaters south of Fargo, North Dakota. From there the canoeists portaged to the Minnesota River and then continued down the Mississippi River to the Intracoastal Waterway at Larose, Louisiana. They followed the Waterway south to Port Isabel, Texas, where they entered the actual Gulf of Mexico, and then skirted the coast of Mexico to Veracruz where they spent three and a half months (November 1980 to mid February 1981) to recover from the journey to date, a journey that had been—and would continue to be—fraught with difficulty. By this time, Jeff Starkell had decided to abandon the adventure and Donald and Dana continued on alone.

They paddled along the rest of Mexico and Central America to South America. Off the Guajira Peninsula in Colombia they were beset by modern pirates but escaped. They almost died on the Gulf of Coro, Venezuela after being trapped on a sandbar by strong headwinds as their food supplies ran out. Eventually, on October 14, 1981, they made land at Port of Spain, Trinidad, where they recuperated for six weeks.

On New Years Day, 1982, they set off from Port of Spain and three days later crossed the Columbus Channel to Venezuela. There, at Pedernales, they entered the delta of the Orinoco River. Over the next two months they paddled virtually the entire length of the Orinoco to Tama Tama where they entered the Casiquiare canal, the only natural canal in the world. Via this route they reached the Rio Negro and then the Amazon River at Manaus, Brazil. From Manaus, they paddled downriver to the Atlantic coast. The journey ended at Belem on May 2, 1982.

In 1986, the names of Don Starkell and his son Dana were entered into the Guinness Book of World Records for having completed the longest canoe journey ever, a distance of 19,603 kilometres (12,181 mi).

He was inducted into the Manitoba Sports Hall of Fame in 2006 in recognition of his all round athletic excellence.

== Paddle to the Arctic ==
In 1990, Starkell sought to trace the Northwest Passage by kayak. Though comparatively short—at 3,000 miles—the trip was more difficult due to the cold weather. It lasted three years and had to be terminated just thirty miles short of its planned completion point at Tuktoyaktuk, due to the onset of winter and frostbite. Starkell lost the tops of his fingers and some of his toes. "When I did the Arctic trip, I gave absolutely everything I had and that was success," he said.

== Publications ==
- Don Starkell, edited by Charles Wilkins, Paddle to the Amazon, Toronto: McLelland and Stewart, 1987
- Don Starkell, Paddle to the Arctic, Toronto: McLelland and Stewart, 1995
- Victoria Jason, Kabloona in the Yellow Kayak: One Women's Journey Through the Northwest Passage, Turnstone Press Limited, 1996. (Account by one of the participants in the Arctic journey)
