= Bernadette Bowyer =

Canadian field hockey player

Personal information
- Full name: Bernadette Maria Bowyer
- Born: January 23, 1966 (age 60) Brampton, Ontario, Canada

Sport
- Sport: Field hockey
Medal record
Women's field hockey
Representing Canada
Pan American Games
| Silver medal – second place | 1991 Havana | Team competition |
| Bronze medal – third place | 1995 Mar del Plata | Team competition |

Bernadette Maria Bowyer (born January 23, 1966, in Brampton, Ontario) is a former field hockey player from Canada.

Bowyer represented her native country at the 1992 Summer Olympics in Barcelona, Spain. The Canadian National Team finished seventh in the competition.
