= Brazilian Carnival Ball =

Annual fundraising event in Toronto, Canada

The Brazilian Carnival Ball, casually referred to as the Braz, was an annual black tie fundraising event] in Toronto, started by Anna Maria De Souza. The event ran from its first year in 1966 to its last in 2012. During its running, it is estimated that the event raised $60 million for a variety of causes and institutions in Canada and South America.

== History ==
The Brazilian Carnival Ball began as a small fundraiser in 1966, the inaugural night taking place in the basement of the St. Agnes Church at Dundas and Grace Street in Toronto. By 1974, the ball was taking place in the Royal York's Imperial Room.

In 2002, the ball took place in Paris, at Versailles.

The final event took place on Saturday, September 15, 2012. The final night raised approximately $500,000 in support of de Souza Institute Foundation and the Canadian Association of Psychosocial Oncology (CAPO).
