= O'Keefe Centre Presents =

- Genre: Variety
- Country of origin: Canada
- Original language: English
- No. of seasons: 1

Production
- Producers: Drew Crossan; Bob Jarvis; Paddy Sampson
- Running time: 60 minutes

Original release
- Network: CBC Television
- Release: 16 October 1967 – 24 March 1968

O'Keefe Centre Presents is a series of Canadian variety specials that aired on CBC Television from 1967 to 1968.

== Premise ==
This series of entertainment specials was mostly recorded at Toronto's O'Keefe Centre. With some performances recorded at CBC-TV studios in Toronto such as the new colour studio on Parliament Street.

== Production ==
Series producers were Drew Crossan and Bob Jarvis, except the 23 November 1967 episode which was produced by Paddy Sampson.

== Scheduling ==
The hour-long episodes were broadcast at 8:00 p.m. (Eastern) as follows:

1. 16 October 1967 "The Rock Scene – Like It Is!" (Noel Harrison host; Chris Beard writer): Jefferson Airplane, The Doors, Dionne Warwick, Sérgio Mendes and Brasil 66, Eric Andersen, and Don Thompson with his 25-member band
2. 23 November 1967: Harry Belafonte, Miriam Makeba
3. 10 December 1967 (Alex Barris writer): Al Hirt, Shirley Bassey, Rich Little
4. 16 January 1968 (Alex Barris writer): George Burns, Mary Lou Collins, The Hansen Sisters (violin), Donna Hossack (harp), Monique Leyrac, Les Miladies (vocal group), Sandra O'Neill (dancer), Teresa Stratas and Martine Van Hamel (National Ballet of Canada)
5. 13 February 1968: musical version of Tom Jones (Ruth Batchelor and Bob Roberts, composers and lyricists), featuring actors Robin Ward and Douglas Fairbanks, Jr.
6. 24 March 1968: Johnny Cash
