= Levon Ichkhanian =

- Born: May 16, 1964 (age 61)
- Genres: Jazz, world, Middle Eastern, folk
- Occupation(s): Musician, composer
- Instrument(s): Guitar, oud, bouzouki, mandolin
- Years active: 1980–present
- Website: levonmusic.com

Levon Ichkhanian (born May 16, 1964) is an Armenian-Lebanese guitarist.

== Career ==
The son of Armenian jazz pianist Edouard Ichkhanian, he was born on May 16, 1964, and moved with his family from Lebanon to Toronto, Ontario, when he was 12. In his teens he switched from classical guitar to electric guitar. At 13 he performed professionally with Armenian pop singer Adiss Harmandian. Four years later a scholarship from the Ontario Arts Council helped him study jazz at the University of Toronto. In the 1990s he took lessons from jazz guitarists Jim Hall, Steve Khan, and Pat Martino. In addition to guitar he plays mandolin, bouzouki, and oud.

== Discography ==
- After Hours (Jazz Heritage Society, 1996)
- Travels (2002)
- Kick-n' Jazz
