= Blodwen Davies =

Canadian writer (1897–1966)

- Born: May 18, 1897; Montreal, Quebec, Canada
- Died: September 10, 1966 (aged 69); Cedar Grove, Markham, Ontario, Canada
- Occupation: Writer
- Writing career
- Pen name: Brook Abbott
- Period: 20th century
- Genres: History, travelogues

Blodwen Davies (May 18, 1897 – September 10, 1966) was a Canadian journalist, historian and travel writer.

== Biography ==
Davies was born in Montreal, Quebec, in 1897. Her parents were David Williams Davies, a coal miner and boiler engineer and Edith McQueston. She was educated at a convent in nearby Longueuil. After graduation, she became a journalist and worked for a newspaper in Fort William, Ontario.

In 1921, she moved to Toronto where she became an advocate for the Group of Seven and eventually became the first biographer for Tom Thomson. She published A Study of Tom Thomson: The Story of a Man Who Looked for Beauty and for Truth in the Wilderness in 1935. She earned a living as a freelance writer and researcher. Many of her books explored Canada's social history, highlighting the same cities and regions that were also favourites of the Group of Seven.

In the late 1930s, she moved to New York City where she became involved in scientific humanism. She co-wrote a book with Oliver Reiser, Planetary Democracy, on the subject. In 1946, she moved back to Ontario where she lived on a rural property north of Toronto. She spent the remainder of her life writing travelogues about Canada and studying the lore of the local Mennonite community. She died in Cedar Grove, Ontario, in 1966.

== Works ==
- Storied Streets of Quebec (1927)
- Old Father Forest (1930)
- Daniel du Lhut (1930)
- Ruffles and Rapiers (1930)
- Paddle and Palette: The Story of Tom Thomson... (1930)
- Saguenay "Saginawa": The River of Deep Waters (1930)
- The Charm of Ottawa (1932)
- Saguenay and Gaspe, (1932)
- Romantic Quebec (1932)
- A Study of Tom Thomson (1935)
- Planetary Democracy (1944) [with Oliver L Reiser]
- Youth, Marriage and the Family (1948)
- Gaspé: Land of History and Romance (1949)
- Quebec: Portrait of a Province (1951)
- Ottawa: Portrait of a Capital (1954)
- A String of Amber: The Heritage of the Mennonites (1973)

== Legacy ==
In 2021, Blodwen Davies Park in the Greensborough area of Markham was opened.
