= The Man (Lorne Greene album) =

Studio album by Lorne Greene
- Released: 1965
- Genre: Country music
- Length: 34:30
- Label: RCA Victor

Singles from The Man
- 1. "Ringo" Released: October 1964

Professional ratings
Review scores
Source	Rating
AllMusic	4.5/5 stars

The Man is an album by Canadian musician and actor Lorne Greene. It was released by RCA Victor in 1965.

Greene introduces each song on the album. The title is a reference to Greene's selection as Canada's Man of the Year, in 1965.

"The Man" peaked at No. 72 on the Billboard Hot 100 chart.

== Track listing ==
=== Original release ===
1. "Pop Goes the Hammer" – 3:09
2. "End of Track" – 2:28
3. "Nine Pound Hammer" – 2:37
4. "Bring on the Dancing Girls" – 2:16
5. "Oh! What a Town" – 3:08
6. "Fourteen Men" – 2:40
7. "Destiny" – 2:56
8. "Sixteen Tons" – 3:12
9. "Trouble Row" – 3:30
10. "Chickasaw Mountain" – 1:58
11. "Darling, My Darling" – 3:21
12. "The Man" – 3:21

=== 2009 edition bonus tracks ===
In addition to the original release, bonus tracks were released in 2009:

13. "The Search" – 3:16
14. "Dig, Dig, Dig, Dig (There's No More Water in the Well)" – 2:12
15. "Ol' Cyclone" – 2:37
16. "Twilight on the Trail" – 2:25
17. "Geronimo" – 2:45
18. "Mule Train" – 2:11
19. "I'm a Gun" – 3:33
20. "Gunslinger's Prayer" – 2:30
21. "An Ol' Tin Cup (And a Battered Ol' Coffee Pot)" – 2:53
22. "Endless Prairie" – 3:14
23. "Ringo" – 3:36
24. "Five Card Stud" – 2:59
25. "Cool Water" – 2:50
26. "The Devil's Grin" – 2:08
27. "Gold" – 1:59
28. "Sand" – 2:12
