= Tom Hanson (photojournalist) =

Canadian photographer (1967–2009)

- Born: May 1, 1967; Rochester, New York, U.S.
- Died: March 10, 2009 (aged 41); Ottawa, Ontario, Canada
- Education: Vanier College, Concordia University
- Occupation: Photojournalist
- Years active: 1989–2009
- Employer: Canadian Press
- Notable work: Oka Crisis photograph of Mohawk warrior Richard Nicholas; Coverage of the Summit of the Americas (2001); Canadian mission in Afghanistan
- Spouse: Catherine Marshall
- Awards: Canadian Press Picture of the Year (1992); Canadian Press Photographer of the Year (2002)

Tom Hanson (May 1, 1967 – March 10, 2009) was a Canadian photojournalist.

== Career ==
Tom Hanson was born in Rochester, New York and later moved with his family to Montreal, where he grew up. Hanson was educated at Vanier College and Concordia University. He began freelancing for the Canadian Press in 1989, becoming a staff member in Ottawa in 1992. Hanson was awarded the Canadian Press Picture of the Year Award in 1992. In 2002, he was named Canadian Press Photographer of the Year. Hanson's photographs documented Canadians major events such as the Oka Crisis, the Summit of the Americas in Quebec City, the 2006 evacuation of Canadians from Lebanon and the Canadian mission in Afghanistan.

Hanson married Catherine Marshall. His interests included playing guitar, motorcycles and ice hockey.

He died of an apparent heart attack after collapsing following a pick-up game of ice hockey in Ottawa.

Hanson was eulogized in the Canadian House of Commons by speakers from all parties including the Prime Minister.

== Famous photos ==
His image of the Mohawk warrior Richard Nicholas standing atop of an overturned Sûreté du Québec car as part of the barricade during the Oka crisis is one of the iconic images of the conflict.

In a strange twist, Richard Nicholas, pictured in the photo, died in a car crash the same day and at the same age of Hanson.

He was also a handful of photographers present during the signing of the Ottawa Treaty (Anti-Personnel Mine Ban Convention), which bans landmines. The signing took place in 1997 in Ottawa and had the participation of hundreds of heads of state and government.
