= 1964 in Canada =

- Decades: 1940s; 1950s; 1960s; 1970s; 1980s
- See also: History of Canada; Timeline of Canadian history; List of years in Canada

Events from the year 1964 in Canada.

== Incumbents ==
=== Crown ===
- Monarch – Elizabeth II

=== Federal government ===
- Governor General – Georges Vanier
- Prime Minister – Lester B. Pearson
- Chief Justice – Robert Taschereau (Quebec)
- Parliament – 26th

=== Provincial governments ===
==== Lieutenant governors ====
- Lieutenant Governor of Alberta – John Percy Page
- Lieutenant Governor of British Columbia – George Pearkes
- Lieutenant Governor of Manitoba – Errick Willis
- Lieutenant Governor of New Brunswick – Joseph Leonard O'Brien
- Lieutenant Governor of Newfoundland – Fabian O'Dea
- Lieutenant Governor of Nova Scotia – Henry Poole MacKeen
- Lieutenant Governor of Ontario – William Earl Rowe
- Lieutenant Governor of Prince Edward Island – Willibald Joseph MacDonald
- Lieutenant Governor of Quebec – Paul Comtois
- Lieutenant Governor of Saskatchewan – Robert Hanbidge

==== Premiers ====
- Premier of Alberta – Ernest Manning
- Premier of British Columbia – W.A.C. Bennett
- Premier of Manitoba – Dufferin Roblin
- Premier of New Brunswick – Louis Robichaud
- Premier of Newfoundland – Joey Smallwood
- Premier of Nova Scotia – Robert Stanfield
- Premier of Ontario – John Robarts
- Premier of Prince Edward Island – Walter Shaw
- Premier of Quebec – Jean Lesage
- Premier of Saskatchewan – Woodrow Lloyd (until May 2) then Ross Thatcher

=== Territorial governments ===
==== Commissioners ====
- Commissioner of Yukon – Gordon Robertson Cameron
- Commissioner of Northwest Territories – Bent Gestur Sivertz

== Events ==
- March 13 – Canada begins a decades-long peacekeeping mission in Cyprus
- March 23 – George Stanley first describes and sketches the proposal for Canada's new flag that is eventually accepted
- March 26 – The White Paper on Defence is tabled.
- March 27 – Several towns in coastal British Columbia, including Prince Rupert, Tofino, Port Alberni and Zeballos, suffer damage from tsunamis associated with the Good Friday earthquake in Alaska. Overall damage is estimated at $10 million.
- April – Canadians are issued Social Insurance cards for the first time
- April 22 – Saskatchewan election: Ross Thatcher's Liberals win a majority, defeating Woodrow Lloyd's Co-operative Commonwealth Federation, ending almost 20 years of CCF rule over the province.
- May 2 – W. Ross Thatcher is sworn in as Premier of Saskatchewan
- May 17 – The first Tim Hortons restaurant was opened, making its debut on the corner of Ottawa Street North and Dunsmore Street in Hamilton, Ontario, as Tim Horton Donuts.
- May 27 – The Prime Minister unveils the "Pearson Pennant", his preferred, but ultimately unsuccessful, design for a new national flag.
- June 15 – The Great Canadian Flag Debate begins in the House of Commons.
- June 19 – The Hall Commission Report recommending the creation of Canada's medicare programme was tabled in the House of Commons.
- July 16 – Canada extends its exclusive fishing zone to 12 nautical miles (22 km; 14 mi) off-shore
- July 17 – Operation Snowball, a 0.5 kiloton conventional explosive test at Suffield Experimental Station in Alberta
- August 22 – The Beatles play at Empire Stadium in Vancouver, their first performance in Canada.
- September 7 – The Beatles play at Maple Leaf Gardens in Toronto
- September 8 – The Beatles play at the Montreal Forum
- September 10 – After almost three months of debate in the Commons, the flag question is referred to an all-party committee.
- September 17 – The flag committee meets for the first time.
- October 5 – Queen Elizabeth II and Prince Philip, Duke of Edinburgh, begin an eight-day visit to Canada.
- October 22 – The flag committee makes its final selection of the design that will become the national flag.
- November 9 – Max Saltsman wins Waterloo South by-election, campaigning against a mere flag taking priority over important social issues such as medicare
- November 30 – John Diefenbaker launches a filibuster to try to prevent the introduction of a new Canadian flag
- December 16 – A resolution creating the new Flag of Canada is passed in the House of Commons after much controversy.

=== Full date unknown ===
- Canada pulls its peacekeepers out of Zaire
- Glenn Gould gives up doing live performances
- Governor General Georges Vanier hosts the "Canadian Conference of the Family"
- Innis College founded at the University of Toronto
- Canada passes act to change Air Canada's name.

== Arts and literature ==
=== New books ===
- Understanding Media: The Extensions of Man: Marshall McLuhan
- The Circle Game: Margaret Atwood
- The Laughing Rooster: Irving Layton
- Flowers for Hitler: Leonard Cohen
- The Stone Angel: Margaret Laurence

=== Awards ===
- See 1964 Governor General's Awards for a complete list of winners and finalists for those awards.
- Stephen Leacock Award: Harry J. Boyle, Homebrew and Patches Clarke Irwin
- Vicky Metcalf Award: John F. Hayes

=== Television ===
- October 4 – The controversial news show This Hour Has Seven Days premieres on CBC.

== Sport ==
- March 14 – The Alberta Golden Bears win their first University Cup by defeating Sir George Williams Georgians 9 to 1. The final game was played at the Kingston Memorial Centre
- May 2 – Northern Dancer wins the Kentucky Derby.
- Summer – At the Olympic Games held in Tokyo, Japan, Canada wins one gold medal.
- April 25 – The Toronto Maple Leafs win their twelfth Stanley Cup by defeating the Detroit Red Wings 4 games to 3. The deciding Game 7 was played at Maple Leaf Gardens
- November 28 – In a rematch of the 51st Grey Cup, the BC Lions win their first Grey Cup by defeating the Hamilton Tiger-Cats 34–24 in the 52nd Grey Cup at Toronto's Exhibition Stadium

== Births ==
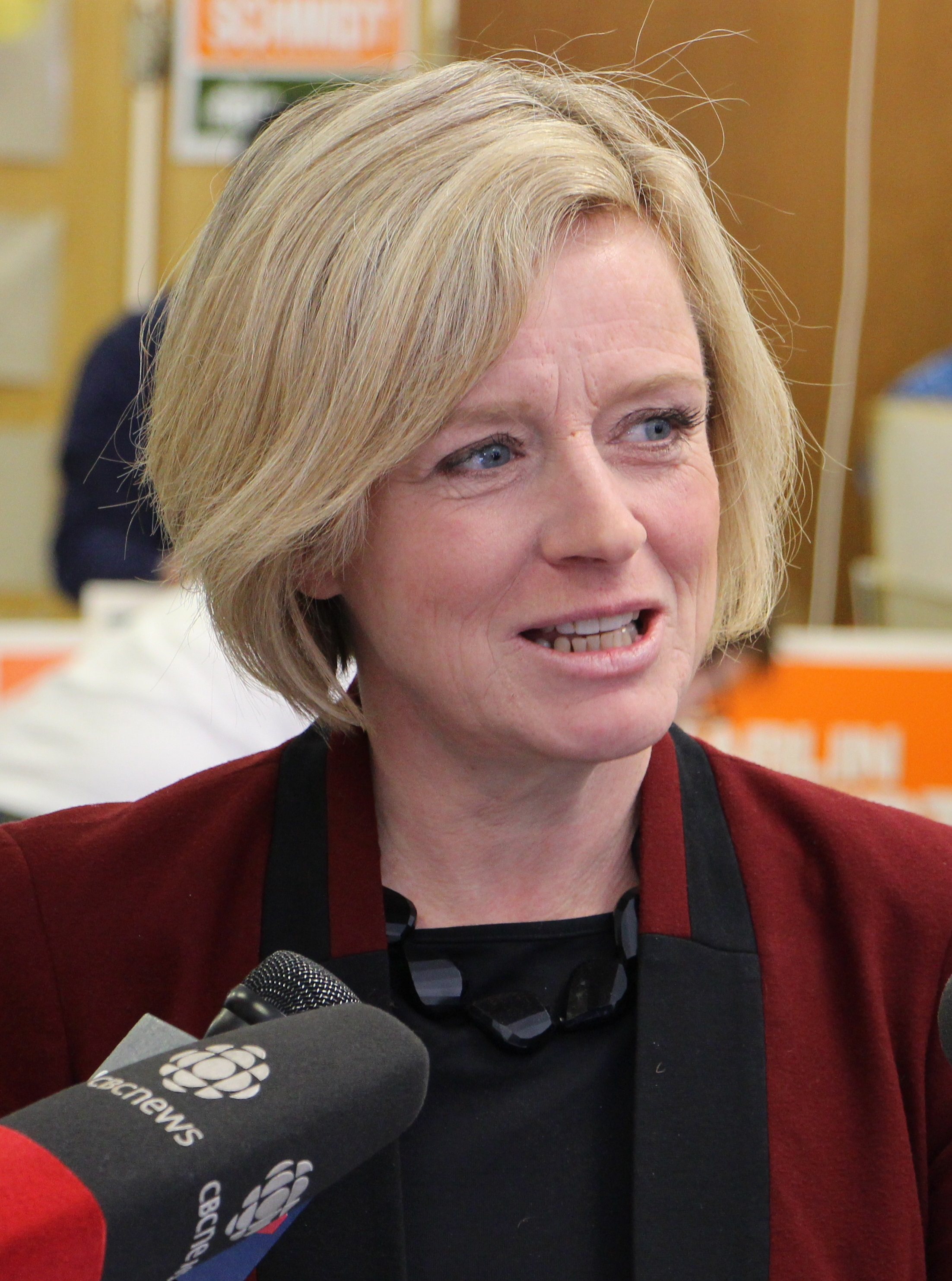
Rachel Notley

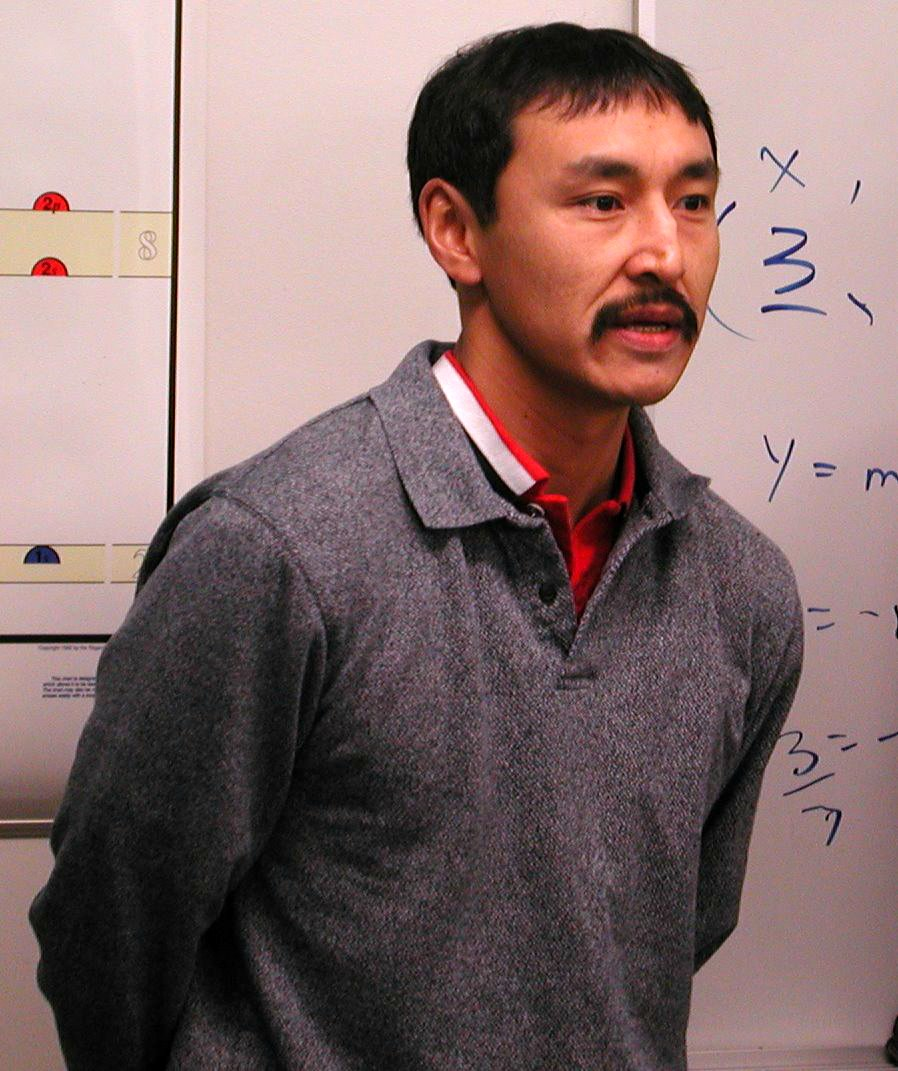
Paul Okalik

=== January to June ===
- January 8 – Ron Sexsmith, singer-songwriter
- January 10 – Brad Roberts, lead singer and guitarist
- January 31 – Sylvie Bernier, diver and Olympic gold medallist
- February 1 – Sharon Bruneau, bodybuilder and fitness competitor
- February 10
  - Victor Davis, swimmer, Olympic gold medallist and World Champion (d. 1989)
  - Gregory Edgelow, wrestler
- February 17 – Sherry Hawco, artistic gymnast (d. 1991)
- February 29 – Lyndon Byers, ice hockey player and radio host (d. 2025)
- April 1 – Scott Stevens, ice hockey player
- April 4 – Laurie Gelman, television personality and writer
- April 7 – Steve Graves, ice hockey player
- April 13 – Caroline Rhea, stand-up comedian and actress
- April 15 – Beverly Thomson, journalist and broadcaster (d. 2025)
- April 17 – Rachel Notley, politician and 17th Premier of Alberta
- May 3 – Ron Hextall, ice hockey player
- May 7 – Ritu Khullar, chief justice of Alberta (d. 2026)
- May 13 – Robert Marland, rower and Olympic gold medallist
- May 17 – Elfi Schlegel, gymnast
- May 20 – Petr Kellner, entrepreneur (d. 2021)
- May 24 – Clayton Gerein, Paralympic athlete (d. 2010)
- May 26 – Paul Okalik, politician and 1st Premier of Nunavut
- June 9 – Gloria Reuben, singer and actress
- June 14 – Randall Thompson, boxer
- June 16 – Brad Fay, sportscaster
- June 21 – Rick Duff, boxer
- June 22 – Angelo Tsarouchas, comedian/actor
- June 26 – Ian Tracey, actor
- June 28 – Christina Ashcroft, sport shooter

=== July to December ===
- July 24 – Stéphan Bureau, journalist, TV interviewer and producer
- July 14 – Craig McKinley, physician and aquanaut (NEEMO 7 mission) (d. 2013)
- July 24 – Erminia Russo, volleyball player
- July 25 – Lisa LaFlamme, journalist and news anchor
- August 6 – Alison Baker, racewalker
- August 9 – Brett Hull, ice hockey player and coach
- August 17 – Colin James, singer, guitarist and songwriter
- August 26
  - Dave Boyes, rower and Olympic silver medallist
  - Bobby Jurasin, Canadian football defensive lineman
- August 27 – Paul Bernardo, serial killer and rapist
- August 30 – Milena Gaiga, field hockey player
- September 1 – Brian Bellows, ice hockey player
- September 2 – Keanu Reeves, actor
- September 12 – Greg McConnell, indie rock musician (d. 1999)
- September 14 – Terrence Paul, rower and Olympic gold medallist
- September 18 – Kelly-Ann Way, track cyclist and road bicycle racer
- September 22 – Wayne Yearwood, basketball player and coach
- September 24 – That Vegan Teacher, activist, educator, and influencer
- September 23 – Diana Dutra, female boxer
- September 25 – Ray Lazdins, discus thrower
- September 26 – Marc Lépine, mass murderer (d. 1989)

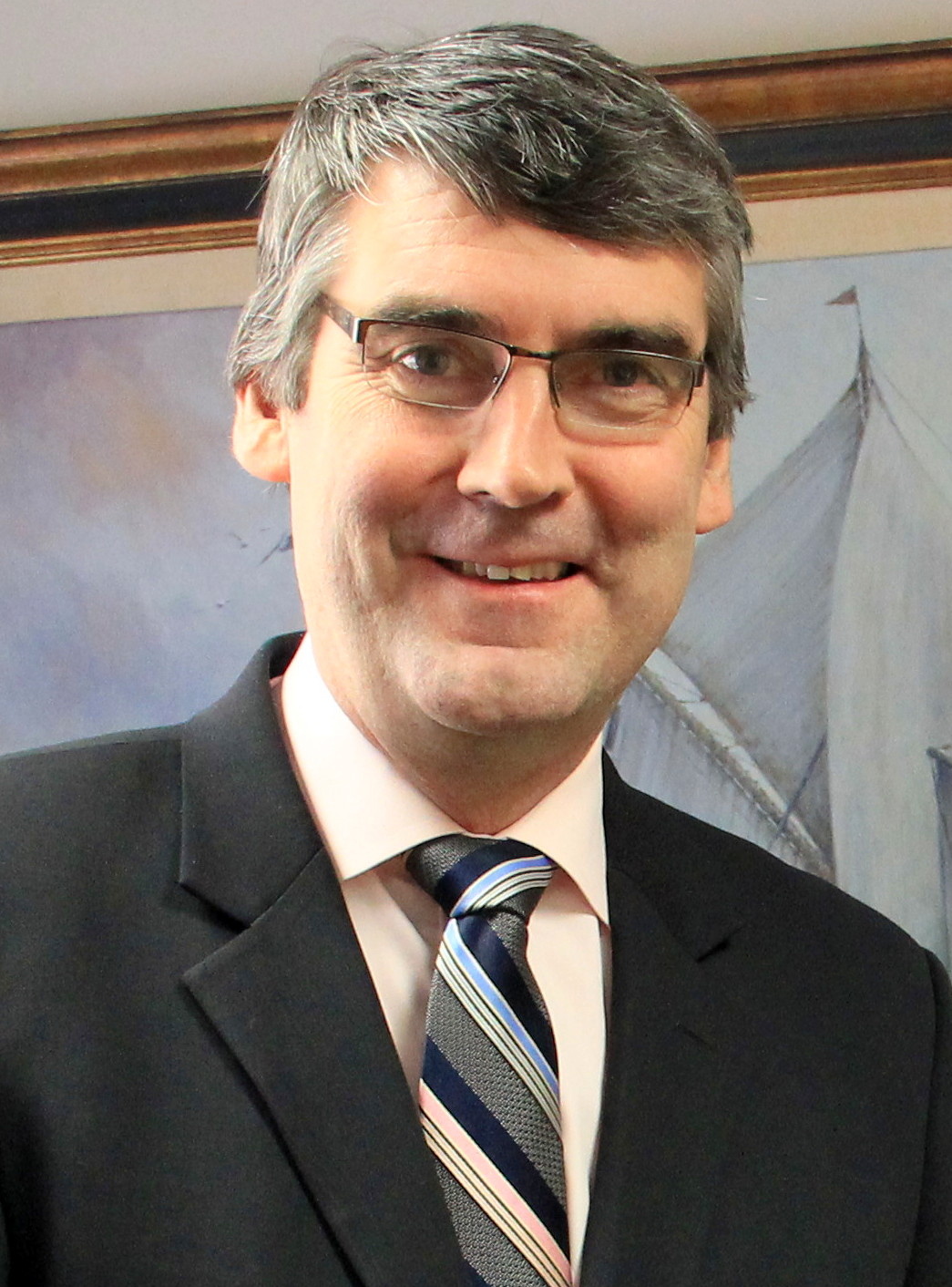
Stephen McNeil

- October 9 – John Ralston, actor
- October 14 – David Kaye, actor and voice actor
- October 23 – David Sobolov, voice actor and director
- October 24
  - Linda Ballantyne, voice actress
  - Paul Bonwick, Canadian House of Commons member
- October 26 – Marc Lépine, murderer responsible for the École Polytechnique massacre (d. 1989)
- October 29 – May Allison, long-distance runner
- November 3 – Christian Mistral, Canadian novelist, poet, and songwriter (d. 2020)
- November 9 – Leah Pells, track and field athlete
- November 10 – Stephen McNeil, politician and 28th Premier of Nova Scotia
- November 14 – Silken Laumann, rower
- November 15 – David Caplan, politician and Minister
- November 16 – Diana Krall, jazz pianist and singer
- December 11 – Carolyn Waldo, synchronized swimmer
- December 19 – Lorie Kane, golfer
- December 27 – Kevin Patterson, medical doctor and writer

=== Full date unknown ===
- Gary Barwin, poet, author and musician
- Maurice Vellekoop, artist and illustrator

== Deaths ==
- January 1 – William Herbert Burns, politician (b. 1878)
- January 12 – Byron Ingemar Johnson, politician and 24th Premier of British Columbia (b. 1890)
- February 18 – Joseph-Armand Bombardier, inventor, businessman and founder of Bombardier Inc. (b. 1907)
- March 3 – Angus MacInnis, politician (b. 1884)
- April 4 – Sarah Ramsland, politician, first woman elected to the Legislative Assembly of Saskatchewan (b. 1882)
- April 20 – Joseph-Alphida Crete, politician (b. 1890)
- April 26 – E. J. Pratt, poet (b. 1882)
- June 9 – Max Aitken, 1st Baron Beaverbrook, business tycoon, politician and writer (b. 1879)
- June 12 – Paul Carpenter, actor (b. 1921)
- August 7 – Arsène Gagné, Quebec politician (b. 1910)
- September 5 – William Sherring, marathon runner and Olympic gold medallist (b. 1878)
- December 9 – Elmore Philpott, journalist and politician (b. 1896)
- December 14 – Roland Beaudry, politician, journalist, publicist and publisher (b. 1906)

=== Full date unknown ===
- Léo Gauthier, politician (b. 1904)

== See also ==
- 1964 in Canadian television
- List of Canadian films
