= Alberta Music Festival Association =

Alberta Music Festival Association. (A.F.M.A.)' is an organization formed in 1964 to co-ordinate the various local music competitions held throughout the province of Alberta, Canada. Initial funding was provided by the Government of Alberta, which through its Cultural Development Branch, continues to provide funding to this day.

It was founded by Florence Musselwhite of Calgary, Alan Walker of Drumheller, Ken Crockett and Cora Molstad of Edmonton, Seyward Smith of Lethbridge. Many smaller communities in Alberta now hold annual competitions, with the A.M.F.A. acting as the formal federation of these individual groups.

By 1990 it had 30 member festivals, each represented on the board of directors.

== Bibliography ==
- Musselwhite, Florence I. 'Encyclopedia of Music in Canada' 2nd edition (University of Toronto Press: 1992)
- Wodell, F.W. 'The Alberta musical competition festival at Edmonton,' Musician, 16, 1911
- Moore, Louise A. deW. 'Progressive Alberta,' CanJM, Jul-Aug 1915
- Coutts, George. 'Music festivals of western Canada,' CRMA, Oct 1943
