= Jim Matt =

- Born: January 18, 1964 (age 61)
- Origin: Englehart, Ontario, Canada
- Genres: Country
- Occupation: singer
- Instrument: Vocals
- Years active: 1993–1996
- Labels: Little Dog; Mercury/PolyGram

Jim Matt (born January 18, 1964) is a Canadian country music singer. Matt was signed to Little Dog Records in 1993 and released his album All My Wild Oats in 1995. The album was also released in the United States on Mercury Records. The album produced three chart singles on the Canadian RPM country charts; however, no singles charted in the United States.

He is currently based in Sudbury, Ontario, where he married jazz singer Sarah Craig in July 2011. The evening before their actual wedding, the couple put together The Wedding Rehearsal, a show at the Sudbury Theatre Centre which featured performances by Matt, Craig and several other local musicians.

== Discography ==
=== Albums ===
Year	Album
1995	All My Wild Oats

=== Singles ===
Year	Album	CAN Country	Album
1995	"Better Place to Live"	39	All My Wild Oats
1995	"This Old Guitar"	18	All My Wild Oats
1996	"Vince Gill, Ricky Skaggs, and Me"	67	All My Wild Oats
