= Carl Dair =

Canadian graphic designer

Harris Carleton Dair (February 14, 1912 – September 28, 1967), known as Carl Dair, was a Canadian graphic designer, teacher, type designer, and author. Primarily a self-taught designer, Dair was internationally known and developed visual design principles for typography which are still in use today.

== Early life ==
Dair was born in Crowland Township in Welland, Ontario, in 1912, to William Albert Dair and Bertha Minnie Dair (née White). Dair's first job as an 18-year-old was creating advertising and layouts for the Stratford Beacon-Herald.

== Career ==
Dair formed a partnership with Henry Eveleigh and set-up the Dair-Eveleigh Studio from 1947-51 in Montréal, Quebec. He worked principally as a freelance designer on a variety of jobs from department store art director to the typographic director for the National Film Board of Canada (1945). Dair lectured on typography at the Ontario College of Art between 1959 and 1962, as well as teaching at the Jamaica School of Arts and Crafts for two years.

Dair published a book, Design with Type, in 1952; it was revised and republished in 1967. In it he described principals of design using primarily typefaces; in particular, he outlined visual principles of harmony and contrast codifying seven kinds of typographic contrast: size, weight, structure, form, texture, colour, and direction. "Contrast is the opposite of concord; it is based on a unity of differences." Design with Type became the first Canadian book to receive the Book of the Year Award from the American Institute of Graphic Arts (AIGA). It was republished by the University of Toronto Press (First Edition) in 2000.

In 1956 and 1957, after receiving the RSC fellowship, Dair studied type design and manufacture in the Netherlands. He studied metal type and hand-punching at Enschedé Foundry in Haarlem, Netherlands, where he created a silent film called Gravers and Files documenting the craft of punchcutter P. H. Radisch.

Dair's experiences at Enschedé prepared Dair for the creation of a typeface called Cartier, which was commissioned and released for Canada's 1967 centenary celebrations, to be an identifiable Canadian typeface. The original design was based on hand-lettering and had some weaknesses as a typeface, which were corrected by Rod McDonald for Monotype Imaging and released in 2000. Cartier is now widely used in Canada.

In 1959, Dair was awarded the silver medal at the Internationale Buchkunst-Austellung in Leipzig, East Germany. In 1962, The Royal Canadian Academy of Arts awarded him its Arts Medal. In 1967, he became a fellow in the Society of Graphic Designers of Canada (GDC).

Dair died on a flight from New York City to Toronto on September 28, 1967. The Faculty of Fine Arts at York University honors Dair's contribution to design in Canada with the Carl Dair Memorial Scholarship. A collection of Dair's work can be seen on the Centre for Contemporary Canadian Art website.

== Typefaces ==
Typefaces Designed by Carl Dair:

- Cartier (1967, Mono Lino)
  - Raleigh a 1977 revival of Cartier by Robert Norton, available as digital type from URW++, ParaType, Bitstream Systems, Adobe Systems, Linotype, and Monotype.
  - Cartier Book (2000, Monotype) another revival by Rod McDonald.

== Publications ==
- Dair, C. Design with type. Toronto: University of Toronto Press, (1952; 2nd ed 1967)
- A Typographic Quest, 6 pamphlets published by Westvaco Papers in the 1960s
- Dair, C. (Director). (1957). Gravers and Files [Film].
