= 1967: The Last Good Year =

1997 book by Pierre Berton

- Author: Pierre Berton
- Language: English
- Publisher: Doubleday Canada
- Publication date: September 2, 1997
- Publication place: Canada
- Pages: 384
- ISBN: 978-0-385-25662-9

1967: The Last Good Year is the original title of a book written by Canadian author Pierre Berton. When it appeared in paperback, the title was changed to 1967: Canada's Turning Point. The book describes events of 1967 in Canada which was the Canadian Centennial.

The many topics covered include Expo 67, the World's Fair held in Montreal; the Centennial Voyageur Canoe Pageant; the Stanley Cup finals between the Toronto Maple Leafs and the Montreal Canadiens (still the last such pairing as of 2025); and the rising popularity of future Prime Minister Pierre Trudeau, who at the time was serving as Minister of Justice in Lester B. Pearson's cabinet.

The book also touches on themes that signify the transition western society was undergoing, such as the birth of the hippie movement, the Women's liberation movement, and the prevalence of the drug culture among youth. Canadian society in particular, as the author points out, was starting to shed its strait-laced conservative nature and had begun to adopt more liberal and open-minded viewpoints, confronting such issues as divorce, abortion, homosexuality and the questioning of authority (or the "establishment", as per the lexicon of the times).

Like many of Berton's books, 1967 is written in prose style with distinctly sentimental overtones, as the original title suggests. In fact, many accounts listed in this work reflect Berton's own personal experiences (such as interviews he had conducted with various personalities on his own television program, The Pierre Berton Show) and quite often are told in the first person form.

== Bibliography ==
- Berton, Pierre (1997). 1967: The Last Good Year. Toronto: Doubleday Canada. ISBN 978-0-385-25662-9.
