= Camera West =

Canadian documentary television series

- Genre: Documentary
- Country of origin: Canada
- Original language: English
- No. of seasons: 4

Production
- Running time: 30 minutes

Original release
- Network: CBC Television
- Release: 1 July 1964 – 24 September 1967

Camera West is a Canadian documentary television series that aired on CBC Television from 1964 to 1967.

== Premise ==
This series of mid-year documentaries was produced in Vancouver and concentrated on life in western Canada and featured varying topics.

== Scheduling ==
The first run of this half-hour series was broadcast on Wednesdays at 8:00 p.m. (Eastern) from 1 July to 16 September 1964. In the following seasons it was seen on Sundays, 10:30 p.m. in the second season (11 July to 12 September 1965), 10:00 p.m. in the third season (3 to 24 July 1966) and finally 5:30 p.m. in its fourth season (16 July to 24 September 1967).

== Episodes ==
1964 season

- "Circles of Power" (Michael Rothery producer; Peter Haworth writer), a two-part series on witchcraft
- "Ghost of Walhachin" (Tom Connachie producer and writer), about a British Columbia settlement
- "The Fountain of Youth" (Doug Gillingham), about a health farm
- "The Good Citizens" (Doug Gillingham producer; Hilda Mortimer writer), a two-part series about Chinese Canadians in the west
- "Shawnigan" (George Robertson writer and director), featuring the private Victoria-area Shawinigan Lake School for boys
- "Strange Gray Day, This" (Maurice Embra producer), featuring poet and artist bill bissett
- "Through the Looking Glass" (Michael Rothery producer; David Gray writer), regarding LSD's clinical use
- "Tricks or Treatment" (Gordon Babineau), about hypnotism
- "Whatever Happened to the Horse?"

1965 season

- "Crystal Prize", about an international ski competition at Crystal Mountain, Washington
- "The Heart of the Thing", about Emily Carr
- "Immigrant Impressions": recent immigrants to Vancouver give their impressions of the city and various aspects of Canadian mores and culture
- "The Last Parade", about Portuguese immigrants in the Okanagan Valley
- "A Matter of Choice" (Stanley Fox producer); on British Columbia's Irish Fusiliers
- "Paul Kane"
- "Shawnigan" (rebroadcast from 1964)
- "The Islanders" (George Robertson producer), about the Gulf Islands

1966 season

- "Carole" (Gene Lawrence producer; Dave Brock writer), about Vancouver School of Art student Carole Thompson
- features on Vancouver's West End
- a documentary on how children have less creative initiative as they grow older
- an episode about the Lusitania's sinking, based on Len Chapple's radio documentary
