= 1962 in Canadian television =

The following is a list of events affecting Canadian television in 1962. Events listed include television show debuts, finales, cancellations, and channel launches.

== Events ==
Date	Event
May 26	Canadian Television Network (CTN) changes its name to CTV.
May 26	The first CFL game airs on CTV.
May 26	The 1962 Canadian Film Awards.
June 18	Coverage of the 1962 federal election airs on CBC and CTV. This is the first federal election to air on CTV.
December 21	CHRE-TV goes on the air as a semi-satellite of Moose Jaw CTV affiliate CHAB-TV.

=== Debuts ===
Show	Station	Premiere Date
20/20	CBC Television	April 22
Scarlett Hill	CBC Television	September 17
Flashback	CBC Television	September 23
Music Hop	CBC Television	October 1
Network	CTV	October 1
The Pierre Berton Show	CTV	Unknown
To Tell the Truth	CTV	Unknown
People in Conflict	CTV	Unknown
Take 30		Unknown
Ballads and Bards	CBC Television	Unknown

=== Ending this year ===
Show	Station	Cancelled
Maggie Muggins	CBC Television	June 27
A Case for the Court	CBC Television	Unknown
Club 6	CBC Television	Unknown
Open House	CBC Television	Unknown
Cross Canada Barndance	CTV	Unknown
Showdown	CTV	Unknown
Twenty Questions	CTV	Unknown
West Coast	CTV	Unknown

=== Births ===
- July 15 - Martin Roach, actor and voice actor
- August 29 - Ian James Corlett, voice actor, writer, musician, author and producer
- September 21 - Mark Holden, actor, writer, producer and voice actor

== Television shows ==
=== 1950s ===
- Country Canada (1954–2007)
- CBC News Magazine (1952–1981)
- Chez Hélène (1959–1973)
- Circle 8 Ranch (1955–1978)
- Don Messer's Jubilee (1957–1969)
- The Friendly Giant (1958–1985)
- Hockey Night in Canada (1952–present)
- The National (1954–present)
- Front Page Challenge (1957–1995)
- Wayne and Shuster Show (1958–1989)

=== 1960s ===
- A Kin to Win (1961–1964)
- CTV National News (1961–present)
- The Nature of Things (1960–present, scientific documentary series)
- Razzle Dazzle (1961–1966)
- Reach for the Top (1961–1985)
- Singalong Jubilee (1961–1974)
- Take a Chance (1961–1965)
- Telepoll (1961–1965)

== Television stations ==
=== Debuts ===
Date	Market	Station	Channel	Affiliation	Notes/References
January 14	Rivière-du-Loup, Quebec	CKRT-TV	7	Radio-Canada	Shut down August 31, 2021
November 1	Terrace, British Columbia	CFTK-TV	3	CBC	
December 21	Regina, Saskatchewan	CHRE-TV (semi-satellite of CHAB-TV)	9	CTV	

=== Network affiliation changes ===
Date	Market	Station	Channel	Old affiliation	New affiliation	References
August 25	Moose Jaw, Saskatchewan	CHAB-TV	4	CBC	CTV	

== See also ==
- 1962 in Canada
- List of Canadian films
