= 1963 in Canadian television =

The following is a list of events affecting Canadian television in 1963. Events listed include television show debuts, finales, cancellations, and channel launches, closures and rebrandings.

== Events ==
- April 8 –
  - Coverage of the 1963 federal election airs on CBC and CTV.
  - CJSS becomes the first television station in Canada to become a rebroadcaster.
- May 10—The 1963 Canadian Film Awards.
- November 22—CBC Television breaks the news of the assassination of John F. Kennedy.
- Debut of Hinterland Who's Who.

=== Debuts ===
Show	Station	Premiere Date
The Littlest Hobo	syndication	September 24
The Forest Rangers	CBC Television	December
Elwood Glover's Luncheon Date	CBC Television	Unknown
Mr. Piper	CBC Television	Unknown
Telescope	CBC Television	Unknown
Magistrate's Court	syndication	Unknown

=== Ending this year ===
Show	Station	Cancelled
Network	CTV	Unknown
Ballads and Bards	CBC Television	29 June 1963

== Television shows ==
=== 1950s ===
- Country Canada (1954–2007)
- CBC News Magazine (1952–1981)
- Chez Hélène (1959–1973)
- Circle 8 Ranch (1955–1978)
- Don Messer's Jubilee (1957–1969)
- The Friendly Giant (1958–1985)
- Hockey Night in Canada (1952–present)
- The National (1954–present)
- Front Page Challenge (1957–1995)
- Wayne and Shuster Show (1958–1989)

=== 1960s ===
- 20/20 (1962–1967)
- A Kin to Win (1961–1964)
- CTV National News (1961–present)
- Flashback (game show) (1962–1968)
- Music Hop (1962–1972)
- The Nature of Things (1960–present, scientific documentary series)
- People in Conflict (1962–1970)
- The Pierre Berton Show (1962–1973)
- Razzle Dazzle (1961–1966)
- Reach for the Top (1961–1985)
- Scarlett Hill (1962–1964)
- Singalong Jubilee (1961–1974)
- Take 30 (1962–1983)
- Take a Chance (1961–1965)
- Telepoll (1961–1965)
- To Tell the Truth (1962–1964)

== Television stations ==
=== Debuts ===
Date	Market	Station	Channel	Affiliation	Ref.
April 14	Saguenay, Quebec	CJPM-TV	6	Independent	

=== Closures ===
Date	Market	Station	Channel	Affiliation	Notes
Unknown	Cornwall, Ontario	CJSS-TV	8	CBC Television	Later became a rebroadcaster of Ottawa CTV O&O CJOH-TV

== See also ==
- 1963 in Canada
- List of Canadian films
