= 1961 in Canadian television =

The following is a list of events affecting Canadian television in 1961. Events listed include television show debuts, finales, cancellations, and channel launches.

== Events ==
- Reach for the Top broadcasts for the first time on CBUT. Four years later the show launches nationally on CBC.
- CHCH becomes an independent station after seven years of CBC network affiliation.
- October 1 - The Canadian Television Network launches as Canada's second national television network. The original affiliates are CFCN, CHAN, CJAY, CFTO, CJCH, CFCF, CJOH, and CFRN which was a former CBC affiliate.
- The CTV National News airs its first broadcast not long after the launch of CTN. The original anchors are Peter Jennings, Charles Lynch and Peter Stursberg. The show gets off to a slow start but soon becomes the network's highest rated program.

=== Debuts ===
| Show | Station | Premiere Date |
|---|---|---|
| Razzle Dazzle | CBC Television | October 2 |
| Singalong Jubilee | CBC Television | October 2 |
| Curling on CBC | CBC Television | October 2 |
| Reach for the Top | CBUT | October 2 |
| CTV National News | CTN | October 2 |
| Showdown | CTN | October 2 |
| Cross Canada Barndance | CTN | October 2 |
| West Coast | CTN | October 2 |
| A Kin to Win | CTN | October 2 |
| Twenty Questions | CTN | October 4 |
| Take a Chance | CTN | October 9 |
| Telepoll | CTN | December 3 |

=== Ending this year ===
| Show | Station | Cancelled |

== Births ==
| Date | Name | Notability |
|---|---|---|
| February 24 | Lynette Gillis | Actress, voice actress and singer |
| April 5 | Greg Anderson | Actor |
| September 16 | Jen Tolley | Actress, voice actress and singer |
| September 18 | Andrew Airlie | Scottish-Canadian actor |

== Television shows ==
=== 1950s ===
- Country Canada (1954–2007)
- CBC News Magazine (1952–1981)
- Chez Hélène (1959–1973)
- Circle 8 Ranch (1955–1978)
- Don Messer's Jubilee (1957–1969)
- The Friendly Giant (1958–1985)
- Front Page Challenge (1957–1995)
- Hockey Night in Canada (1952–present)
- Maggie Muggins (1955–1962)
- The National (1954–present)
- Open House (1952–1962)
- Wayne and Shuster Show (1958–1989)

=== 1960s ===
- A Case for the Court (1960–1962)
- Club 6 (1960–1962)
- The Nature of Things (1960–present, scientific documentary series)

== Television stations ==
=== Debuts ===
| Date | Market | Station | Channel | Affiliation | Notes/References |
|---|---|---|---|---|---|
| January 1 | Halifax, Nova Scotia | CJCH-TV | 5 | Independent | |
| January 1 | Toronto, Ontario | CFTO-TV | 9 | Independent | |
| January 20 | Montreal, Quebec | CFCF-TV | 12 | Independent | |
| February 19 | Montreal, Quebec | CFTM-TV | 10 | Independent | |
| March 12 | Ottawa, Ontario | CJOH-TV | 13 | Independent | |
| August 20 | Prince George, British Columbia | CKPG-TV | 2 | CBC Television | |
| October 1 | Edmonton, Alberta | CBXT-TV | 5 | CBC Television (O&O) | |

=== Network affiliation changes ===
| Date | Market | Station | Channel | Old affiliation | New affiliation | References |
|---|---|---|---|---|---|---|
| October 1 | Edmonton, Alberta | CFRN-TV | 3 | CBC Television | CTV | |
| October 1 | Halifax, Nova Scotia | CJCH-TV | 5 | Independent | CTV | |
| October 1 | Montreal, Quebec | CFCF-TV | 12 | Independent | CTV | |
| October 1 | Ottawa, Ontario | CJOH-TV | 13 | Independent | CTV | |
| October 1 | Toronto, Ontario | CFTO-TV | 9 | Independent | CTV | |
| October 1 | Vancouver, British Columbia | CHAN-TV | 8 | Independent | CTV | |
| October 1 | Winnipeg, Manitoba | CJAY-TV | 7 | Independent | CTV | |
| October 8 | Calgary, Alberta | CFCN-TV | 4 | Independent | CTV | |
| Unknown date | Hamilton/Toronto, Ontario | CHCH-TV | 11 | CBC Television | Independent | |
| Unknown date | Wingham, Ontario | CKNX-TV | 8 | CBC Television (primary); CBS (secondary) | CBC Television (exclusive) | |

== See also ==
- 1961 in Canada
- List of Canadian films
