= 1965 in Canadian television =

The following is a list of events affecting Canadian television in 1965. Events listed include television show debuts, finales, cancellations, and channel launches, closures and rebrandings.

== Events ==
Date	Event
May 15	Quentin Durgens, M.P. the first hour-long drama series in Canada first airs on CBC.
May 15	The 1966 Canadian Film Awards.
September 17	The Tommy Hunter Show begins its twenty-seven year run on CBC.
December 4	TV Guide adds more localized editions.

=== Debuts ===
Show	Station	Premiere Date
Seaway	CBC Television	September 16
The Tommy Hunter Show	CBC Television	September 17
Quentin Durgens, M.P.	CBC Television	October 7

=== Ending this year ===
Show	Station	Cancelled
The Littlest Hobo	syndication	November 16
The Forest Rangers	CBC Television	Unknown
Take a Chance	CTV	Unknown
Telepoll	CTV	Unknown

== Television shows ==
=== 1950s ===
- Country Canada (1954–2007)
- CBC News Magazine (1952–1981)
- Chez Hélène (1959–1973)
- Circle 8 Ranch (1955–1978)
- Don Messer's Jubilee (1957–1969)
- The Friendly Giant (1958–1985)
- Hockey Night in Canada (1952–present)
- The National (1954–present)
- Front Page Challenge (1957–1995)
- Wayne and Shuster Show (1958–1989)

=== 1960s ===
- 20/20 (1962–1967)
- Butternut Square (1964–1967)
- Canada 98 (1964–1967)
- Cariboo Country (1960, 1964–1967)
- CTV National News (1961–present)
- Elwood Glover's Luncheon Date (1963–1975)
- Flashbook (1962–1968)
- Land and Sea (1964–present)
- Let's Go (1964–1968)
- Magistrate's Court (1963–1969)
- Music Hop (1962–1972)
- The Nature of Things (1960–present, scientific documentary series)
- People in Conflict (1962–1970)
- The Pierre Berton Show (1962–1973)
- Razzle Dazzle (196–1966)
- Reach for the Top (1961–1985)
- Singalong Jubilee (1961–1974)
- Take 30 (1962–1983)
- Telescope (1963–1973)
- This Hour Has Seven Days (1964–1966)

== Television stations ==
=== Debuts ===
Date	Market	Station	Channel	Affiliation	Notes/References
August 2	Labrador City, Newfoundland and Labrador	CJCL-TV	13	CBC Television	Recalled as CBNLT in 1973 after CBC bought the station; shut down July 31, 2012

== Births ==
Date	Name	Notability
May 13	Alejandro Abellan	Actor
December 10	Stephanie Morgenstern	Actress (Sailor Moon)

== See also ==
- 1965 in Canada
- List of Canadian films
