= Marcel Gaudart =

Marcel Gaudart or Marc Gaudart (10 June 1913–2 July 1959) was a film director, producer, former Jesuit priest (Licence Théologie) and member of the French Resistance. He was sometimes known as Marcel Goddart.

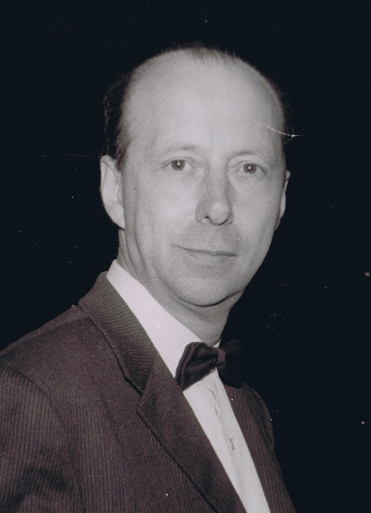
Marcel Gaudart (1913-1959)

== Life and work ==
He was born Marie-François-Antoine-Marcel Gaudart on 10 June 1913, at Pondichéry (in French India). Member of the family Gaudart of India, son of Joseph-James Gaudart and Eugénie Le Gay. He became a Jesuit priest, but he was released from his vows by Pope Pius XII. On 14 April 1951, he was married, at Innsbruck (Austrian Tyrol), to Dorothea Johanna Hübel. They were divorced in Austria on 15 October 1957.

After leaving the religious world, Gaudart became a film producer/director and made several films. He had started his film and sound career after the Second World War, when he was recording interviews and plays for some European radio broadcasters. He moved on to film very quickly and became a TV producer in the 1950s. Although already being successful in Canada, he moved on to Mexico.

For one film, he was in Mexico, where he died (officially on 4 July 1959, his burial date) in rather odd circumstances. Some members of his family think him to be still alive.

== The Fables of La Fontaine ==
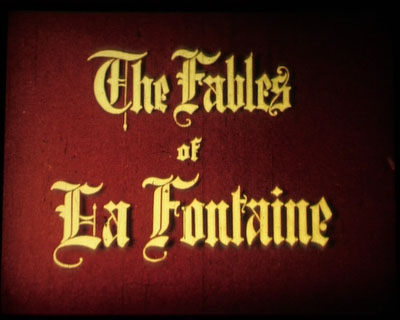
A still taken from the Fables of La Fontaine films

Marc Gaudart produced the Canadian television series Fables of La Fontaine (or Tales of La Fontaine). As a French producer in Canada, Marc Gaudart was responsible for this series of fifteen-minute fables with animal characters, based on stories by the 17th century poet La Fontaine. The films employed the talents of animals from the farm of Lorna Jackson in Mount Albert, Ontario. Gaudart set the animals (mostly small, relatively tame kind, such as parrots, frogs, cats, and pigeons) in miniature sets to "act out" the stories. Cinematographer Fritz Spiess had to spend "hours studying each of the animals used in the series to get to know the different problems posed by each--such as a mouse who refused to ride in canoes, a bored monkey who was fascinated by studio wires and rafters, and a rabbit who became so fond of sitting in a jeep that he refused to get out and race with a turtle".

== Film about Gaudart ==
Marcel Gaudart died over 50 years ago. The adage, "Time goes by but memory remains" is the reason why his granddaughter Nadine Taschler has worked on a 16mm documentary film called "Les Fables de Monsieur Gaudart" which was planned for release in 2012.

== Work partners ==
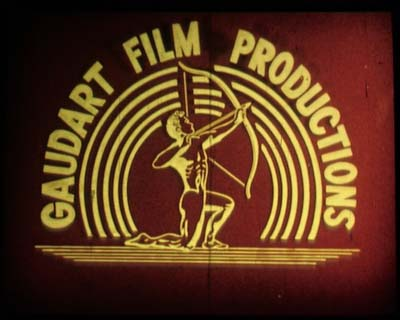
The "Gaudart Film Productions" Logo from 1958

Some co-workers include (note that the type of co-work is not always described):

- Lorna Jackson, animal trainer for the Fables
- Monica Clare
- Fritz Spiess, cinematographer
- József K. Szekeres (Josef Seckeresh; Joe Seckerish)
- Amelia Hall, story teller for the Fables
- Sydney Banks
- Valerie Varda
- Spencer Wood Caldwell
- Frank Radford "Budge" Crawley
- Yousuf Karsh

== See also ==
- Fables of La Fontaine
- Canadian Association of Broadcasters
- History of the Gaudart Family (in French)
