= Monday Night Special =

- Country of origin: Canada
- Original language: English
- No. of seasons: 1

Production
- Running time: 60 minutes

Original release
- Network: CBC Television
- Release: 26 June – 25 September 1961

Monday Night Special is a Canadian free-format television program that aired on CBC Television in 1961.

== Premise ==
Different types of programs were aired each week under the Monday Night Special banner such as dancing, dramas, documentaries and journalistic features. The programming was produced from various sources including the BBC, the National Film Board of Canada and the CBC itself.

The debut episode was a documentary on Upper Canada Village that was previously broadcast on Camera Canada. The BBC productions included the Peter Ustinov interview feature After Supper and a play by Friedrich Schiller. From the Comparisons series came the National Film Board of Canada productions Courtship and Marriage and Of Sport And Men. CBC productions included the Vancouver documentaries Goom Sahm (a Portrait of a Chinese Community) and Man Against Nature, plus an adaptation of the play The Long Night by Joseph Schull and an extended 90-minute episode of A Case for the Court. Other productions included features on Newfoundland and the Banff School of Fine Arts. Ballet performances from the Royal Winnipeg Ballet and The Royal Ballet (UK) were the subject of other episodes.

== Scheduling ==
This hour-long series aired on Mondays at 10:00 p.m. from 26 June to 25 September 1961.
