= Communicate (game show) =

- Genre: Game show
- Directed by: Des Hardman
- Presented by: Tom Harvey (1966); Bill Walker (1966–1967)
- Country of origin: Canada
- Original language: English
- No. of seasons: 1

Production
- Executive producer: Joan Abbey Pass
- Producer: Mel Gunton
- Production location: Montreal
- Running time: 30 minutes

Original release
- Network: CBC Television
- Release: 3 January 1966 – 25 October 1967

Communicate is a Canadian television game show that aired on CBC Television from 1966 to 1967.

== Premise ==
This series was inspired by the American game show Password. Each contestant attempted to determine the name of an object or person based on a single-word clue provided by a teammate. The game was played between two teams, each team consisting of two people where one of those people was a celebrity. The competing pair of teams played up to three rounds, where the winning team remained on the show to play a new team. Contestants who were not celebrities received cash prizes when they won.

Celebrity guests included Frances Hyland, Jane Morgan, Cliff Robertson, Jimmy Tapp, Bill and Marilyn Walker and Paxton Whitehead.

Tom Harvey hosted and moderated the game until December 1966 when he was replaced by Bill Walker.

== Production ==
Communicate was produced in Montreal at the studios of CTV network affiliate CFCF-TV.

== Scheduling ==
This half-hour program was broadcast weekdays at 4:00 p.m. (Eastern) from 3 October 1966 to 25 October 1967.
