= Three Little Words (TV series) =

British TV game show (1967–1986)

- Genre: Game show
- Created by: Roy Ward Dickson
- Presented by: John Edmunds; Don Moss; Alan Taylor; Ray Alan
- Starring: Linda Hayden; Sue Anne Snook; Barbie Hayes
- Country of origin: United Kingdom
- Original language: English

Production
- Running time: 30 minutes (inc. adverts)
- Production companies: TWW (1967); HTV (1975–86)

Original release
- Network: ITV
- Release: 4 July 1967 – 16 December 1986

Three Little Words is a British game show that aired on ITV from 4 July 1967 to 16 December 1986. The show was created by Roy Ward Dickson, who invented many game shows. Hosts included Alan Taylor, who later went on to host Mr and Mrs, another quiz show involving couples.

== Gameplay ==
A word association game, the aim was to get your partner to say a particular word by giving them single word clues.

For example, one partner might offer the clue "headgear" to describe the word "hat".

20 points were given for a word solved on the first clue, 15 points were scored for a word solved on two clues and 10 points were awarded for a word solved on the third attempt. After three clues, the opponents had a shot at the word for 5 points.

After a certain number of words, the team with the higher score became the champions and won money. Teams could win up to six times before being forced to retire.

Ken and Christine Rowland were the only couple to receive full marks having given the correct answers after each first clue word. However, some of their clues, e.g. "Schneider" to produce the answer "trophy", clearly worried Ray Alan and they were not invited back like other winners.

Some contestants would make it a bit harder for their opponents by inserting references that would only mean something to them. For example, one would say a girl's name and the other would reply "Nurse" and get it right (someone they knew with that name being a nurse) or give three personal references that the other partner got wrong, leaving the opposing team to figure out the right answer from just three personal names - the answer being some kind of occupation (relatives and friends of the first couple with those names being in that job). One thing that contestants were not allowed to do was to give 'sounds like' words as clues - the word concerned would be disallowed if they did so.
