= Chez nous =

Chez nous (French pronunciation: [ʃe nu]; French for "with us") may refer to:

- Chez nous (film), English title This Is Our Land, 2017 French-Belgian drama film directed by Lucas Belvaux
- "Chez nous" (song), song by Dominique Walter, French entry to Eurovision Song Contest 1966
- Chez Nous (TV series), Canadian children's television series which aired on CBC Television in 1957.
- Chez Nous (Belgian party), a far-right Belgian political party.

== See also ==
- "Chez nous (Plan d'Aou, Air Bel)", 2017 song written by Jean-Jacques Goldman and sung by Patrick Fiori with Soprano from Fiori's 2017 album Promesse
