= The Jack Kane Show =

- Genre: Variety
- Written by: Bernie Rothman
- Country of origin: Canada
- Original language: English
- No. of seasons: 1

Production
- Producers: Stan Harris (initial two episodes); Bill Davis
- Production location: Toronto
- Running time: 30 minutes

Original release
- Network: CBC Television
- Release: 26 September 1960 – 3 April 1961

Related
- Music '60

The Jack Kane Show is a Canadian music variety television program that aired on CBC Television from 1960 to 1961.

== Premise ==
The series featured the big band music of Jack Kane and was a continuation of his episodes from Music '60, with less elaborate production. Vocalist Sylvia Murphy and Kane's band were the series regulars.

== Scheduling ==
This half-hour series was broadcast Mondays at 8:30 p.m. (Eastern) from 26 September 1960 to 3 April 1961.

Steve Lawrence and Andy Williams were among the visiting performers.
