= Parade (TV program) =

Canadian music variety show

- Genre: Variety
- Written by: Saul Ilson; Frank James
- Directed by: Bill Davis
- Presented by: Bill Walker
- Country of origin: Canada
- Original language: English
- No. of seasons: 4

Production
- Producer: Norman Sedawie
- Running time: 30 minutes

Original release
- Network: CBC Television
- Release: 9 July 1959 – 25 June 1964

Parade is a Canadian music variety show that aired on CBC Television from 1959 to 1964.

== Premise ==
Parade was created as an open-format entertainment program that covered most music styles and included comedy performances. Sometimes an episode would focus on one particular performer, while another episode could feature various entertainers under a particular theme.

The program featured Canadian artists such as the Canadian Opera Company, Maynard Ferguson, Oscar Peterson, the Toronto Symphony Orchestra and the Billy Van Four. Featured international performers included Ernestine Anderson, Pete Seeger and Jonathan Winters. Wayne and Shuster provided their interpretation of James Thurber's Many Moons in a 1963 episode. The "Sing, Sing, Sing" episodes of Parade were recurring occasions which featured Pat Hervey and the Gino Silvi Singers leading a sing-along, supplemented by dance performances from a troupe choreographed by Alan Lund supported by an orchestra led by Bert Niosi.

== Reception ==
In early 1962, Parade was ranked Canada's 17th most popular series according to national ratings by Elliott-Haynes.

== Scheduling ==
This half-hour program was broadcast as follows (times in Eastern):

Day	Time	Season run
Thursdays	8:00 p.m.	9 July to 17 September 1959
Tuesdays	9:30 p.m.	19 July to 20 September 1960
Thursdays	9:30 p.m.	13 July to 7 September 1961
Sundays	7:30 p.m.	17 September 1961 to 24 June 1962
Wednesdays	8:30 p.m.	4 July to 19 September 1962
Wednesdays	8:30 p.m.	26 September 1962 to 3 July 1963
Thursdays	9:30 p.m.	26 September 1963 to 25 June 1964

The episodes from July to September 1962 were rebroadcasts from the two previous seasons.

The program was cancelled after 1964 due to reported reductions in CBC's variety budget. Norman Sedawie, Parade's producer, then left CBC for work in America.
