= Twenty questions =

Spoken guessing game using yes–no questions

Twenty questions is a spoken parlor game which encourages deductive reasoning and creativity. The game dates to at least the eighteenth century and, during the twentieth century, was used as the basis for some radio and television quiz programs.

In the traditional game, the "answerer" chooses something that the other players, the "questioners", must guess. They take turns asking a question, which the answerer must answer with "yes" or "no". In variants of the game, answers such as "maybe" are allowed. Sample questions could be: "Is it bigger than a breadbox?", "Is it alive?", and finally "Is it this pen?". Lying is not allowed. If a questioner guesses the correct answer, they win and become the answerer for the next round. If 20 questions are asked without a correct guess, then the answerer has stumped the questioners and gets to be the answerer for another round.

Careful selection of questions can greatly improve the questioner's odds of winning the game. For example, a question such as "Does it involve technology for communications, entertainment, or work?" allows the questioner to cover a broad range of areas with a single question that can be answered with a simple "yes" or "no", significantly narrowing down the possibilities.

The early history of the game is unclear, but it appears to have been common by at least the 1780s, when the writer Hannah More recorded she and a friend had been "teaching ... the play of twenty questions" to an audience including Sir Joshua Reynolds and Lord North at a London dinner-party.

== Popular variants ==
A common variant is called "animal, vegetable, or mineral". This is taken from the Linnaean taxonomy of the natural world. In this version, the answerer tells the questioners at the start of the game whether the subject belongs to the animal, vegetable, or mineral kingdom. These categories can produce odd technicalities, such as a wooden table being classified as a vegetable (since wood comes from trees), or a belt being classified as an animal (if it is made of leather), a vegetable (if it is made of cloth), or a mineral (if it has a metal or plastic buckle). Another variant is "person, place, or thing".

Other versions specify that the item to be guessed should belong to a given category, such as actions, occupations, or famous people. In Hungary, a similar game is named after Simon bar Kokhba. A version of twenty questions called "yes and no" is played as a parlor game by characters in Charles Dickens' A Christmas Carol.

In the Philippines, a very popular game called Pinoy Henyo (literally “Filipino Genius”) is played nationwide. Instead of the traditional 20 Questions format, players usually have a 2-minute time limit to guess the word or phrase. It is typically played as a team of two: one player asks questions, while the other tries to guess the answer. The answerer can only respond with “Oo” (yes), “Hindi” (no), or “Pwede” (maybe). If the answerer says anything other than these three responses, the team receives a time penalty, reducing the amount of time they have left to guess the answer. The winner is the team that makes the fastest correct guess.

== Computers, scientific method, and situation puzzles ==
The abstract mathematical version of the game where some answers may be wrong is sometimes called Ulam's game or the Rényi–Ulam game. The game suggests that the information (as measured by Shannon's entropy statistic) required to identify an arbitrary object is at most 20 bits. The game is often used as an example when teaching people about information theory. Mathematically, if each question is structured to eliminate half the objects, 20 questions allow the questioner to distinguish between 2^{20} = 1048576 objects. Accordingly, the most effective strategy for the twenty questions is to ask questions that will split the field of remaining possibilities roughly in half each time. The process is analogous to a binary search algorithm in computer science or successive-approximation ADC in analog-to-digital signal conversion.

In 1901, Charles Sanders Peirce discussed factors in the economy of research that govern the selection of a hypothesis for trial: (1) cheapness, (2) intrinsic value (instinctive naturalness and reasoned likelihood), and (3) relation (caution, breadth, and incomplexity) to other projects (other hypotheses and inquiries). He discussed the potential of twenty questions to single one subject out from among 2^{20} and, pointing to skilful caution, said:

Thus twenty skilful hypotheses will ascertain what two hundred thousand stupid ones might fail to do. The secret of the business lies in the caution which breaks a hypothesis up into its smallest logical components, and only risks one of them at a time.

He elaborated on how, if that principle had been followed in the investigation of light, its investigators would have saved themselves half a century of work. Testing the smallest logical components of a hypothesis one at a time does not mean asking about, say, 1048576 subjects one at a time, but extracting aspects of a guess or hypothesis, and asking, for example, "Did an animal do this?" before asking "Did a horse do this?".

That aspect of scientific method also resembles a situation puzzle in that it faces a puzzling scenario at the start (unlike twenty questions). Both games involve asking yes/no questions, but Twenty Questions places a greater premium on efficiency of questioning. A limit on their likeness to the scientific process of testing hypotheses is that a hypothesis, because of its scope, can be harder to test for truth (test for a "yes") than to test for falsity (test for a "no") or vice versa.

In developing the participatory anthropic principle (PAP), which is an interpretation of quantum mechanics, theoretical physicist John Archibald Wheeler used a variant on twenty questions, called surprise twenty questions, to show how the questions we choose to ask about the universe may dictate the answers we get. In this variant, the respondent does not choose or decide upon any particular or definite object beforehand, but only on a pattern of "yes" or "no" answers. This variant requires the respondent to provide a consistent set of answers to successive questions, so that each answer is logically compatible with all previous answers. In this way, successive questions narrow the options until the questioner settles upon a definite object. Wheeler's theory was that, analogously, consciousness may play some role in bringing the universe into existence.

== Radio and TV quiz ==
=== United States ===
In the 1940s, the game became a popular radio panel quiz show, Twenty Questions, first broadcast at 8 pm, Saturday, February 2, 1946, on the Mutual Broadcasting System from New York's Longacre Theatre on West 48th Street. Radio listeners sent in subjects for the panelists to guess in twenty questions; Winston Churchill's cigar was the subject most frequently submitted. On the early shows, listeners who stumped the panel won a lifetime subscription to Pageant. From 1946 to 1951, the program was sponsored by Ronson lighters. In 1952–1953, Wildroot Cream-Oil was the sponsor.

As a television series, Twenty Questions debuted as a local show on New York's WOR-TV Channel 9 on November 2, 1949. Beginning on November 26, the series went nationwide on NBC until December 24, after which it remained dormant until March 17, 1950, when it was picked up by ABC until June 29, 1951. Some of the early TV episodes were simulcast on WOR-TV, WNBT-TV and Mutual radio.

Its longest and best-known run, however, is the one on the DuMont Television Network from July 6, 1951, to May 30, 1954. During this time, original host Bill Slater was replaced by Jay Jackson. After this run ended, ABC picked up the series once again from July 6, 1954, to May 3, 1955. The last radio show had been broadcast on March 27, 1954.

=== Canada ===
Twenty Questions aired locally on CJAY-TV in Winnipeg, Canada, from March to June, 1961 and then on the new CTV network beginning in September, 1961; its host, Stewart Macpherson, went on to become the original host of the UK version.

=== Hungary ===
In Hungary, the game is known as Barkochba, named after Simon bar Kokhba, the leader of the second-century Jewish uprising against the Romans. The story goes that the Romans cut out a spy's tongue, so when he reached Bar Kokhba's camp, he was only able to nod or shake his head to answer Bar Kokhba's questions. The number of questions is not limited to twenty.

Barkochba was played by Frigyes Karinthy and his company in Budapest back in 1911. So the game started in Hungary from the New York café in Budapest.

Barkochba was staged as a television game show Kicsoda-Micsoda? (later renamed Van Benne Valami) on the Hungarian national television Magyar Televízió from 1975 to 1991. It was the first show presented by István Vágó, who would later host the Hungarian versions of Jeopardy! (Mindent vagy semmit!) and Who Wants to Be a Millionaire? (Legyen Ön is milliomos!).

=== Ireland ===
A bilingual (Irish/English) version of Twenty Questions aired on RTE Radio 1 in the 1960s and 1970s. It was hosted by Gearóid Ó Tighearnaigh, written by Dick O'Donovan, and produced by Bill O'Donovan (occasional panelist) and included Dominic O'Riordan, Tony Ó Dálaigh, Seán Ó Murchú, and Máire Noone on the panel. It proved enormously popular, travelling the length and breadth of Ireland and being hosted in local clubs and community halls.

=== Norway ===
NRK aired its own version continuously from 1947 to the early 1980s. In 2004, the radio series was revived and regained its popularity, leading to a 2006 TV version. The Norwegian 20 spørsmål continues on NRK radio and TV, and a web-based game is available at the official NRK website. A 2006 board game based on the series is currently the prize sent to listeners who beat the panel.

=== Poland ===
The Polish version, 20 pytań, was shown on TVP1 in the 1960s; the hosts were Ryszard Serafinowicz and Joanna Rostocka. In the Polish version, there were three 3-player teams: mathematicians, journalists, and a mixed team from Łódź. The show was cancelled after two mathematician players started using a binary search algorithm to narrow down the target word's alphabetical position, thus being able to easily guess any word in less than 20 questions.

=== United Kingdom ===
The BBC aired a radio version from 28 February 1947 to 1976, with TV specials in 1947 and 1948, plus a series from 1956 to 1957. On the radio, the subject to be guessed was revealed to the audience by a "mystery voice" (originally Norman Hackforth from 1947 to 1962; he was later a regular panelist). Hackforth became well known amongst the British public as much for his aloofness as his apparent knowledgeability.

The series was originally presented by Stewart MacPherson. The panel comprised Richard Dimbleby, Jack Train, Anona Winn and Joy Adamson, in later years comedian Peter Glaze also. A later presenter, Gilbert Harding, was ousted in 1960 by producer Ian Messiter when, after having drunk a triple gin-and-tonic he had originally offered to Messiter, proceeded to completely ruin the night's game – he insulted two panelists, failed to recognise a correct identification after seven questions (after revealing the answer upon the 20th question, he yelled at the panel and audience), and ended the show three minutes early by saying "I'm fed up with this idiotic game ... I'm going home". He was replaced by Kenneth Horne until 1967, followed by David Franklin from 1970 to 1972.

A revival ran for one season in the 1990s on BBC Radio 4, hosted by Jeremy Beadle. A version with a rival line-up, produced by commercial station Radio Luxembourg, is not acknowledged by the BBC. Another revival, under the title Guess What?, was hosted by Barry Took for a single series in 1998.

A televised version ran from 1960 to 1961, produced by Associated-Rediffusion for ITV and hosted by Peter Jones (who later hosted in 1974). The "mystery voice" later became a running gag on the radio series I'm Sorry I Haven't A Clue.

The BBC World Service also broadcast a version called Animal, Vegetable and Mineral, chaired by Terry Wogan with a panel including Rachael Heyhoe Flint and Michael Flanders.

In the movie The 20 Questions Murder Mystery (1950), members of the team, including Richard Dimbleby and Norman Hackforth, appear. Together with two newspaper reporters, they work to find the identity of a serial killer who sends in questions for the panel that prefigure his next victim.

== See also ==
- 20Q – Computerized guessing game
- Akinator – 2007 video game similar to the game Twenty Questions
- Aswamedham – Malayalam TV quiz programme
- Guess Who? – Children's board game
- List of programs broadcast by the DuMont Television Network
- List of surviving DuMont Television Network broadcasts
- Situation puzzle – Oral puzzle guessing game
