= Rai Purdy =

Canadian television director and producer (1910–1990)

- Born: Rai Purdy; November 1910; England
- Died: May 1990; Vancouver
- Education: Primary school
- Occupation: Television producer
- Years active: 1910 - 1990
- Employer(s): CFRB Radio, CFTO, CTV
- Awards: Canadian Association of Broadcasters Hall of Fame

Rai Purdy (born Horatio John Purdy; November 1910 – May 1990) was a Canadian television director and producer. He is a member of the Canadian Association of Broadcasters Hall of Fame.

== Early life ==
Rai Purdy was born Horatio John Purdy in England during November 1910 and moved to Toronto in 1911. After dropping out of high school in the 1920s, Purdy became a bicycle messenger, while performing at banquets and church shows to earn extra money. In 1929, Purdy was accepted into the Hart House Theatre Company at the University of Toronto, studying with personalities such as Maud Hope and Dora Mavor Moore. During his time at Hart House, Purdy performed in various Ontario drama festivals and worked with director Edgar Stone. Both Purdy and Stone were interested in radio, which was in its early stages at the time, and Stone got Purdy an audition with radio broadcaster Harry Sedgewick at CFRB Radio in Toronto. At Sedgewick's request, Purdy stopped using the full name Horatio.

== Radio career ==
At CFRB Purdy was eventually promoted to the position of head of the drama department and established the Canadian Theatre of the Air, the first national radio playhouse. Purdy also directed weekly serials, notably Penny's Diary and the thriller Out of the Night. At CFRB Purdy also established contacts with a network that would serve him well in later life. This network included comedian Alan Savage, along with future television personalities Lorne Greene, Monty Hall and Andrew Allan. In 1939 Purdy left CFRB to produce broadcasts for radio stations independently.

In 1941, Purdy joined the Canadian Army as a member of the army broadcast unit, and was promoted to lieutenant in 1942. He produced weekly CBC radio shows and directed the Canadian army stage shows, which in 1943 entertained troops in England. After the war, Purdy produced shows in Toronto for a time, then moved to New York City in 1950 to pursue a career in television with CBS Television. During his time at CBS Purdy produced and directed shows such as The Morning Show with Dick Van Dyke and Merv Griffin and Celebrity Time.

== Television career ==
In 1957 Roy Thomson invited Purdy to help establish Scottish Television in Glasgow as head of the programming department. At the time, Scottish Television was an ITV contractor and followed the trend of making cutbacks to funding, and by 1959 Purdy decided to return to Canada to work on the CFTO television license application, where he remained as director of programs until 1961, when he resigned to set up his own programming company, Rai Purdy Productions, where he directed People in Conflict and Magistrate's Court for CTV.

Purdy also hosted Telethon shows for twenty years, raising over $250,000,000 (CAD) for various Lions Clubs, Variety Clubs and hospitals until his death in Vancouver in May 1990. In November 2007 Purdy was inducted into the Canadian Association of Broadcasters' Hall of Fame.
