= Mr and Mrs (game show) =

British TV game show (1965–1999)

- Also known as: The All-New Mr. and Mrs. Show (1995–1996)
- Created by: Roy Ward Dickson
- Presented by: Alan Taylor; Derek Batey; Norman Vaughan; Nino Firetto; Julian Clary
- Starring: Katrina Buchanan (1995–1996); Stacey Young (1999)
- Country of origin: United Kingdom
- Original language: English
- No. of series: 2 (UK Living version); 1 (Carlton version)
- No. of episodes: 52 (UK Living version); 6 (Carlton version)

Production
- Running time: 30 minutes (inc. adverts)
- Production companies: HTV (1972–1976); Border (1972–1988); HTV West for UK Living (1995–1996); Action Time in association with Carlton (1999)

Original release
- Network: TWW (1965–1967); ITV (1967–1988, 1999); UK Living (1995–1996)
- Release: 23 February 1965 – 2 July 1999

Related
- All Star Mr & Mrs; The Newlywed Game; Tattletales

Mr and Mrs is a British television game show that aired on ITV, hosted most familiarly by Derek Batey and based on the Canadian show of the same title.

== Format ==
Each couple attempted to match each spouse's answers to six questions concerning their domestic and love life. The couple would switch roles after the first three questions. For each set of three questions, one spouse would attempt to predict how the other, seated behind a window and wearing headphones, would answer those questions. Each couple's winnings depended on how many times their answers matched. Any couple that successfully matched answers to all six questions would win a jackpot prize.

== Broadcasting ==
The series was unusual in versions being made by more than one ITV region: Alan Taylor hosted the TWW version, Derek Batey hosted the version produced by Border and Norman Vaughan hosted a version made by Anglia. The first version for TWW began in 1964, with the Border version following in 1967. The Anglia version ran for one year (1969) across the ITV network, but it was not until 1972 that the series was regularly networked, with hosts Batey and Taylor alternating each week. In 1976 the Border version alone was transmitted nationally, and remained part of the daytime scheduling until 1988.

There was also a local version of the programme produced by Tyne Tees in 1976, shown on Sunday afternoons in summer and autumn. Tyne Tees had previously provided colour production facilities for Border in the early 1970s to produce their version as the latter had not yet upgraded to colour production.

It was then aired on UK Living and regionally on HTV, hosted by Nino Firetto and entitled The All-New Mr and Mrs Show, and then back on the ITV network in 1999 hosted by Julian Clary.

The show was part of an eight-episode series called Gameshow Marathon hosted by Vernon Kay and aired on 12 May 2007.

It was revived in 2008 as a celebrity game show entitled All Star Mr & Mrs, hosted by Phillip Schofield, originally with Fern Britton.

== Transmissions ==
=== UK Living version ===
Series	Start date	End date	Episodes
1	8 January 1995	1996	52

=== Carlton version ===
Series	Start date	End date	Episodes
1	19 March 1999	2 July 1999	6

== International versions ==
The show originated in Canada in 1963. The Canadian version was produced at CFTO-TV in Toronto and ran on the CTV network for 780 episodes, and was hosted by Peter Parker. Roy Ward Dickson was the show's creator.

The British version originated in Wales in 1964 as a Welsh language only programme in the same format entitled Sion a Sian, Sion a Siân or Siôn a Siân ("John and Jane") where it continued until 2003 presented by Ieuan Rhys. It was first broadcast on TWW, then HTV and finally S4C. The series was revived in 2012, presented by Stifyn Parri and Heledd Cynwal. That year saw Sion a Sian feature its first gay couple.

Country	Local name	Host(s)	Network	Year aired
Canada (original format)	Mr and Mrs	Peter Parker	CTV	1963–1965
Hungary	Mr. és Mrs.	Claudia Liptai and Attila Till	TV2	2009–2010
Poland	On i ona	Agata Młynarska and Krzysztof Ibisz	Polsat	2010
Russia	Ты и я Ty i ya	Tigran Keosayan and Alyona Khmelnitskaya	Rossiya 1	29 August 2009 – 26 December 2010
Wales	Sion a Sian	Dewi Richards (1964); Ifor Bowen Griffith (1965–1967); Dai Jones (1971–1987); Ieuan Rhys and Gillian Elisa (1996–2003); Stifyn Parri and Heledd Cynwal (2012–2016)	TWW (1964–1967); HTV (1971–1982); S4C (1983–1987, 1996–2003, 2012–2016)	1964–1967; 1971–1987; 1996–2003; 2012–2016
