= Jack Kane (composer) =

Canadian arranger, conductor, clarinetist and composer of English birth

Jack Kane (29 November 1924 – 27 March 1961) was a Canadian arranger, conductor, clarinetist, and composer of English birth. He lived in Toronto, Ontario with his wife Clare and their children. His 1958 recording Kane is Able was nominated for a Grammy Award for Best Performance by an Orchestra or Instrumentalist with Orchestra. He was highly active as an arranger and music director for Canadian television during the 1950s. His career was cut short by his death from cancer at the age of 36. The Canadian Encyclopedia states, "At the time of his death, Kane was considered one of Canada's leading arrangers. He later was honoured by a Canadian Talent Library Trust LP of his big band arrangements, under the direction of Bert Niosi."

== Life ==
Born John Kane in London, he was the son of British music-hall entertainer Barry Kane. In 1933 he moved with his family to Canada where he began appearing as a singer with his father in vaudeville performances in Toronto at the age of 9. A year later he won a performance contest at the Roxy Theatre.

In 1939 Kane entered the Toronto Conservatory of Music where he studied the clarinet with Herbert Pye through 1942. He began performing with the High Timers band in the early 1940s, making his radio debut with the group in 1941. From 1942 to 1945 he played in the Band of the Royal Canadian Corps of Signals and in 1945-1946 he led his own band, the Khaki Kollegians, which performed in entertainments for the Canadian Army.

After the end of World War II, Kane resumed his musical studies with John Weinzweig with whom he studied music composition from 1946 to 1948. During these years he composed his first concert works, including two interludes for woodwinds (1947) and a string quartet (1948). He also actively performed with a number of orchestras associated with the Canadian Broadcasting Corporation during the mid to late 1940s. In 1949 he was appointed assistant arranger-conductor to Howard Cable at the CBC.

During the early 1950s, Kane began to compose his first larger orchestral works, such as Suite for Orchestra (1950), Concerto for Saxophone (1951), and a symphony which he began but never finished. In 1950 he was appointed chief arranger for the CBC Radio program Startime and in 1951 he was awarded the Maurice Rosenfeld Prize for promising newcomer to Canadian radio. He became actively involved as a music director for CBC Television, serving in that capacity for such shows as On Stage (1954), The Jackie Rae Show (1955), and Summertime '57'. He also worked as a music director in the United States during the late 1950s for CBS and NBC, using his talents for shows starring Eydie Gormé, Steve Lawrence, Ethel Merman, and Andy Williams.

In the late 1950s and early 1960s, Kane had his own orchestra with the CBC for which he arranged/composed much of their repertoire in addition to serving as the group's conductor. The ensemble played on their own show, The Jack Kane Show, and for other programs. The orchestra made several recordings; the first of which, Kane is Able, was nominated for a Grammy Award for Best Performance by an Orchestra or Instrumentalist with Orchestra. The orchestra's other recordings include: Jack Kane Salutes the Comics (1959), Jack Kane Salutes the Women of Show Business (1960), and Raisin' Kane (1961). Kane's discography also includes recordings also made with Steve Allen, Dorothy Collins and Jane Harvey in the United States during the late 1950s.
