= Live a Borrowed Life =

Canadian quiz show television series

- Genre: Quiz show
- Written by: Bernard Slade
- Presented by: Charles Templeton
- Country of origin: Canada
- Original language: English
- No. of seasons: 4

Production
- Producers: Claude Baikie (1959); Drew Crossan (1960-1961) and Len Casey (1961-1962)
- Running time: 30 minutes

Original release
- Network: CBC Television
- Release: 1 July 1959 – 25 June 1962

Live a Borrowed Life is a Canadian quiz show that aired on CBC Television from 1959 to 1962.

== Premise ==
This series adopted the Front Page Challenge concept for the realm of biography. In each episode, each of three guests would represent a historical person whose identity the panelists would guess. Charles Templeton was the series host.

Initially, the regular panelists were Anna Cameron (of Open House), Bill Walker and Elwy Yost, joined by a guest panelist. By the 1960–1961 season, Cameron had moved to the United Kingdom and was replaced by a second guest panelist. In the middle months of 1960, the series was produced in other locations, namely Halifax, Montreal, Ottawa, Vancouver and Winnipeg.

== Scheduling ==
The initial episodes of this half-hour series was broadcast on Wednesdays at 8:30 p.m. (Eastern) from 1 July to 23 September 1959. It was picked up for a full season in the same day and time slot from 30 September 1959 to 21 September 1960. Its second full season was seen on Thursdays at 8:00 p.m. (29 September 1960 – 29 June 1961), then its final season moved to Mondays at 8:30 p.m. from 25 September 1961 to 25 June 1962.

== Controversy ==
The series drew some controversy when George Rolland, who promoted white racial supremacist views, was brought on the show to represent Abraham Lincoln.
