= Chez Nous (TV series) =

- Genre: Children's television
- Presented by: Alan Mills; Hélène Baillargeon
- Country of origin: Canada
- Original languages: English; French
- No. of seasons: 1

Production
- Running time: 30 minutes

Original release
- Network: CBC Television
- Release: 21 October – 30 December 1957

Chez Nous (French pronunciation: [ʃe nu]) is a Canadian children's television series that aired on CBC Television in 1957.

== Premise ==
Alan Mills and Hélène Baillargeon hosted this English and French language children's series.

== Chez Jacques ==
This series was originally planned as Chez Jacques with host and folk singer Jacques Labrecque. He hosted one episode on 7 October 1957, but two weeks later the series was abruptly renamed Chez Nous where Labrecque was replaced by Baillargeon and Mills.

== Scheduling ==
This half-hour series was broadcast on alternate Mondays at 5:00 p.m. (North American Eastern time) from 21 October to 30 December 1957. The Golden Age Players was broadcast in the time slot on other weeks.
