= Bill Walker (broadcaster) =

Canadian broadcaster and actor

- Born: William Walker; December 20, 1922; Rouleau, Saskatchewan, Canada
- Died: June 25, 1995 (aged 72); Oakville, Ontario, Canada
- Occupation(s): radio and television host, actor
- Years active: 1930s-1980s
- Known for: Music '60, Parade, Party Game
- Spouse: Marilyn Whittet

Bill Walker (1922 - 1995) was a Canadian broadcaster and actor.

Originally from Rouleau, Saskatchewan, he began his broadcasting career on Regina radio station CJRM before enlisting in the Royal Canadian Air Force during World War II. He flew 35 missions as a bomber pilot, including the first daylight raid on the Ruhr Valley. Following the war he returned to the station as morning host and program director; at this time he also began acting in community theatre productions, winning the award for Best Actor at the Saskatchewan Regional Drama Festival five times and at the Dominion Drama Festival twice. During this era he married Marilyn Whittet, an actress and dancer he met in a production of Junior Miss.

The couple moved to Winnipeg in 1950, where Walker became host of the program Walker's Wigwam on CKRC, and to Toronto in 1954, where he first worked as an advertising spokesman in Ford Motor Company commercials. He also appeared as an actor in CBC Television anthology series such as General Motors Theatre, Encounter, Folio, First Performance and On Camera, and a panelist on Live a Borrowed Life. He was later the host of music variety programs such as Music '60 and Parade, and game shows such as Flashback, Communicate and Party Game.

He was twice host of the Canadian Film Awards ceremonies, cohosting with Louise Marleau at the 20th Canadian Film Awards in 1968 and hosting on his own for the 22nd Canadian Film Awards in 1970. He also had selected stage acting roles, most notably playing Henry Higgins in the Rainbow Stage production of My Fair Lady in 1966.

Toward the end of his career he returned to radio, recording news commentaries for Toronto's CFRB.

In 1994, he sustained a hairline fracture of the neck in a car accident. His health declined afterward and he died approximately a year later, at age 72. He was posthumously inducted into the Canadian Association of Broadcasters' Hall of Fame.
