= Alan Taylor (television presenter) =

British game show host

Alan Taylor (1924 – January 1997) was a British television presenter from Cardiff, popular in Wales and the Westcountry during the 1960s and 1970s.

Taylor was born in Cardiff, where his family had an electrical business. He served in the Royal Navy during the Second World War. He began his television career as a continuity announcer with TWW in 1959. He also appeared in early episodes of "Paint Along With Nancy on HTV where he assisted the host.

After presenting a birthday slot with a glove puppet called "Tinker", he went on to host a regular children's magazine programme called Tinker and Taylor on which he would often play the melodica with the puppet. In the early 1970s he presented a Saturday morning children's programme on HTV called Orbit, which featured an alien puppet called "Chester". He also narrated and voiced all the characters in all 13 episodes of the 1975 animated series Flower Stories created by Kate Canning. He later hosted several quiz and game shows on ITV, including Three Little Words and Mr. & Mrs., noted for his distinctive monocle. He retired in 1982, ran an antique shop in Bath for a time, and then moved to Spain, where he died.
