= The Golden Age Players =

- Genre: Children's television
- Directed by: Valentine Boss
- Country of origin: Canada
- Original language: English
- No. of seasons: 1

Production
- Producer: Alan Brown
- Production location: Montreal
- Running time: 30 minutes

Original release
- Network: CBC Television
- Release: 14 October – 23 December 1957

The Golden Age Players is a Canadian children's drama television series that aired on CBC Television in 1957.

== Premise ==
Children acted in dramatic plays such as Empress and the Four Seasons, The Snow Queen (by Hans Christian Andersen) and The Birthday of the Infanta (or The Infanta's Dwarf, by Oscar Wilde). Wardrobe was by Jacqueline Boss, whose son Valentine was the series director.

== Scheduling ==
This half-hour series was broadcast on alternate Mondays at 5:00 p.m. from 14 October to 23 December 1957. Chez Nous appeared on the other Mondays.
