= Sydney Banks =

Canadian actor, broadcaster and producer

Sydney Banks (January 6, 1917 – November 14, 2006) was a pioneer Canadian broadcaster and producer.

== Biography ==
=== Early days ===
Sydney Banks was born in Toronto, Ontario, Canada on January 6, 1917. His parents were English, and Banks and his mother returned to England in 1919, to Cumbria, but they returned to Canada in the late 1920s. After spending a brief time in Chatham, they moved to Toronto, where they lived in Cabbagetown. Banks went first to school at Our Lady of Lourdes, and then to Danforth Tech, but he left school when he was only 14.

=== Career beginnings ===
Banks began his multi-faceted career as a child actor in England. In turn, he became a leading stage director and actor in the 1930s in Canada moving into radio where he earned kudos as an actor and writer. While in England, Banks had done stage work as a child actor, and he then did some radio work for CFRB, as well as getting involved in the Toronto theatre scene.

From 1936 to 1941, Banks also acted in many roles with the Theatre of Action, a left-wing drama company, which produced several others who would go on to fame, including Wayne and Shuster, Lou Applebaum, Lou Jacobi, Ben Lennick, Sydney Newman and Lorne Green. Banks directed the Theatre of Action's final production, of John Steinbeck's Of Mice and Men, in Toronto in 1940. He was also a co-founder (with Al Mulock) of the Red Barn Theatre on Lake Simcoe.

=== Military service ===
In 1941, during World War II, Banks joined the army as a captain in the Canadian Army Film Unit, and after D-Day he spent time in the Netherlands, Belgium and Germany.

=== Broadcasting pioneer ===
After demobilization, Banks became executive producer of International Productions. This made him Canada's first active television producer with responsibility for weekly show broadcasts from US border stations for Canadian consumption. He established the first TV commercial production unit in Canada and also in 1949 the first TV department for a major Canadian ad agency.

In 1952, as Canada began TV broadcasting, Banks expanded into Canadian television program production. In 1955, he joined the late Spence Caldwell at S.W. Caldwell Ltd as executive producer, and ran the Rank organisation's Queensway Studios. He then moved to Foster Advertising, where he started their television advertising department. This involved frequent travel to the States, where he produced commercials for the Canadian brewing company Carling. Banks was also the principal founder of Canada's first Film Producers Association.

In 1962, after working with Jerry Solway of Astral Films on several major television projects, Banks went out on his own, forming his own company S. Banks (In Television) Ltd., and began producing music series for television. He had shows on both CBC and CTV, including Cross Canada Barndance, A Singin', Let's Sing Out, Brand New Scene and Country Music Hall. In 1961 he became the first president of the Directors' Guild of Canada and returned to the presidential chair twenty years later. He received a Distinguished Service Award from the Directors' Guild in 2003. He also served for a time as a director of the Association of Motion Picture Producers and Laboratories.

Also in the sixties, Banks started booking shows and tours for a wide range of artists from country to early rock to comedy, including bringing Jerry Lee Lewis, Eric Clapton and George Carlin to Canada. He was at one time producer of the Mariposa Folk Festival and was still on the Mariposa Board of Advisors at the time of his death.

In 1970 he partnered with Al Bruner in appearing before the CRTC to apply for a license for Global Television Network, of which he became co-founder and executive producer. By the mid-1970s, Banks had created, produced, and sometimes directed over 450 films and TV programs plus innumerable TV commercials.

On leaving Global, he became a founder and director of the Toronto cable firm CUC Broadcasting, which became one of the largest cable systems in the Greater Toronto area, and was eventually sold to Shaw Cable in 1994.

During the 1980s and 1990s, Banks was president of S Banks Group Inc which includes Ennerdale Productions and S. Banks (in-television) Limited. During this period of time, he traveled around the world doing business in a variety of different industries including animation where he partnered with Al Guest and Jean Mathieson.

In the 1980s and 1990s, Banks cut back on his business activities to look after his ailing wife Shirley. He remained in close touch with the film business, and, after Shirley's passing, on January 6, 1995, he resumed full-time activities in film and television. In 1998, he was executive producer of the Canadian film Heart of the Sun, whose cast included Christianne Hirt, Michael Riley, and Graham Greene, and which was produced by his company Ennerdale Productions.

Banks also maintained a home in Palm Springs, California. (Note: Cary Grant and Barbara Hutton were spouses at the time)

Syd Banks died in Toronto on November 14, 2006, at the age of 89.
