= Derek Batey =

English television presenter

- Born: 8 August 1928; Brampton, Cumberland, England
- Died: 17 February 2013 (aged 84); Lytham St Annes, Lancashire, England
- Occupations: Television presenter; television executive
- Spouse: Edith Batey
- Children: 1

Derek Batey (8 August 1928 – 17 February 2013) was an English television presenter and television executive.

== Early life ==
Batey was born in Brampton, Cumberland, and educated at the White House School, Brampton.

== Career ==
After appearing in clubs as a ventriloquist, Batey made his first TV appearance in 1958 as an interviewer for the BBC. In 1961 he moved to the newly established Border Television, where he became known as "a classless hero who blazed a trail in popular television." He is best known for hosting the original 450-episode run of the game show Mr. and Mrs., which was for many years the only programme produced by Border Television that was networked nationally. He also hosted the talk show Look Who's Talking.

Batey also hosted Try for Ten, another game show produced by Border in Carlisle. Contestants on the show tried to give ten consecutive correct True or False answers to a series of statements. Contestants were eliminated if they gave three wrong answers in a row, or a total of ten wrong answers. If the game ended early, they won £1 per answer for their best run of correct responses. If they reached their target of ten, they won a rolling jackpot that increased by £25 per failure.

In 2006, it was confirmed that Batey would be working as a consultant (including writing some of the questions) on the latest version of Mr. and Mrs. on ITV1.

== Personal life ==
Batey resided in Florida with his wife, Edith, to whom he was married for 62 years, and had one daughter.

== Death ==
Batey died in a hospice in Lytham St Annes, Lancashire after a short illness, aged 84.
