= Network (TV series) =

Canadian variety television series

- Genre: variety television
- Presented by: Bill Brady; Denyse Ange
- Country of origin: Canada
- Original language: English
- No. of seasons: 1

Production
- Production locations: Toronto, Ontario, Canada
- Running time: 30 minutes

Original release
- Network: CTV
- Release: 1962 – 1963

Network is a Canadian variety television series which aired on CTV for one season during the 1962-63 television season. The show was co-hosted by Bill Brady and Denyse Ange. Live and taped segments were aired from either the studio or elsewhere in Canada.
