= Fables of La Fontaine (TV series) =

Canadian children's television series

- Genre: Children's television
- Country of origin: Canada
- Original language: English
- No. of seasons: 1

Production
- Producer: Marc Gaudart
- Cinematography: Fritz Spiess
- Running time: 15 minutes

Original release
- Network: CBC Television
- Release: 2 January – 3 July 1958

Fables of La Fontaine is a Canadian children's television series featuring animal actors that aired on CBC Television in 1958.

== Premise ==
Animals on miniature sets portrayed characters in adaptations of poems by Jean de La Fontaine. Fritz Spiess, the series cinematographer, also served as animal wrangler as he solved challenges of uncooperative animals such as a rabbit that stubbornly remained in a vehicle instead of racing a turtle according to a story line.

French producer Marc Gaudart was responsible for this series of fifteen-minute fables with animal characters, based on stories by the 17th-century poet La Fontaine. The films employed the talents of animals from the farm of Lorna Jackson in Mount Albert, Ontario. Gaudart set the animals—most the small, relatively tame kind, such as parrots, frogs, cats, and pigeons- -in miniature sets to "act out" the stories. Cinematographer Fritz Spiess had to spend "hours studying each of the animals used in the series to get to know the different problems posed by each--such as a mouse who refused to ride in canoes, a bored monkey who was fascinated by studio wires and rafters, and a rabbit who became so fond of sitting in a jeep that he refused to get out and race with a turtle" CBC times

The celebrated fables of 17th-century poet/fantasist Jean de la Fontaine were brought to life on this weekly, 15-minute Canadian children's series. Since virtually all of La Fontaine's stories were adapted from Aesop, it was logical that the series featured an all-animal cast. But instead of utilizing cartoons or puppets, this program used actual animals, borrowed from Lorna Jackson's farm in Mount Albert Ontario; she enacted the fables on tiny scale-model sets. It was up to the series' supremely patient cinematographer Fritz Spiess to elicit the proper expressions and reactions from his non-human actors, and to gently coerce the "cast" into cooperating for the camera (a well-publicized incident occurred when, during filming of the "Tortoise and the Hare" sequence, the hare chosen as the lead character could not be persuaded to leave the tiny set and race with the equally blasé tortoise). Fables of La Fontaine was aired by CBC on Thursdays from 2 January to 3 July 1958. ~ Hal Erickson, Rovi

== More Information ==
Hervé Bromberger did not direct the "Fables of La Fontaine" which were produced by Marcel Gaudart in 1958. He directed a French comedy that was also called "Fables of La Fontaine" in 1962, the exact title of this film is "Les quatre vérités"

== Scheduling ==
This 15-minute series was broadcast on Thursdays at 5:15 p.m. (Eastern) from 2 January to 3 July 1958.

== See also ==
- Tales of the Riverbank
