= Gerard Tierney =

Irish bi-lingual radio personality (1923–1979)

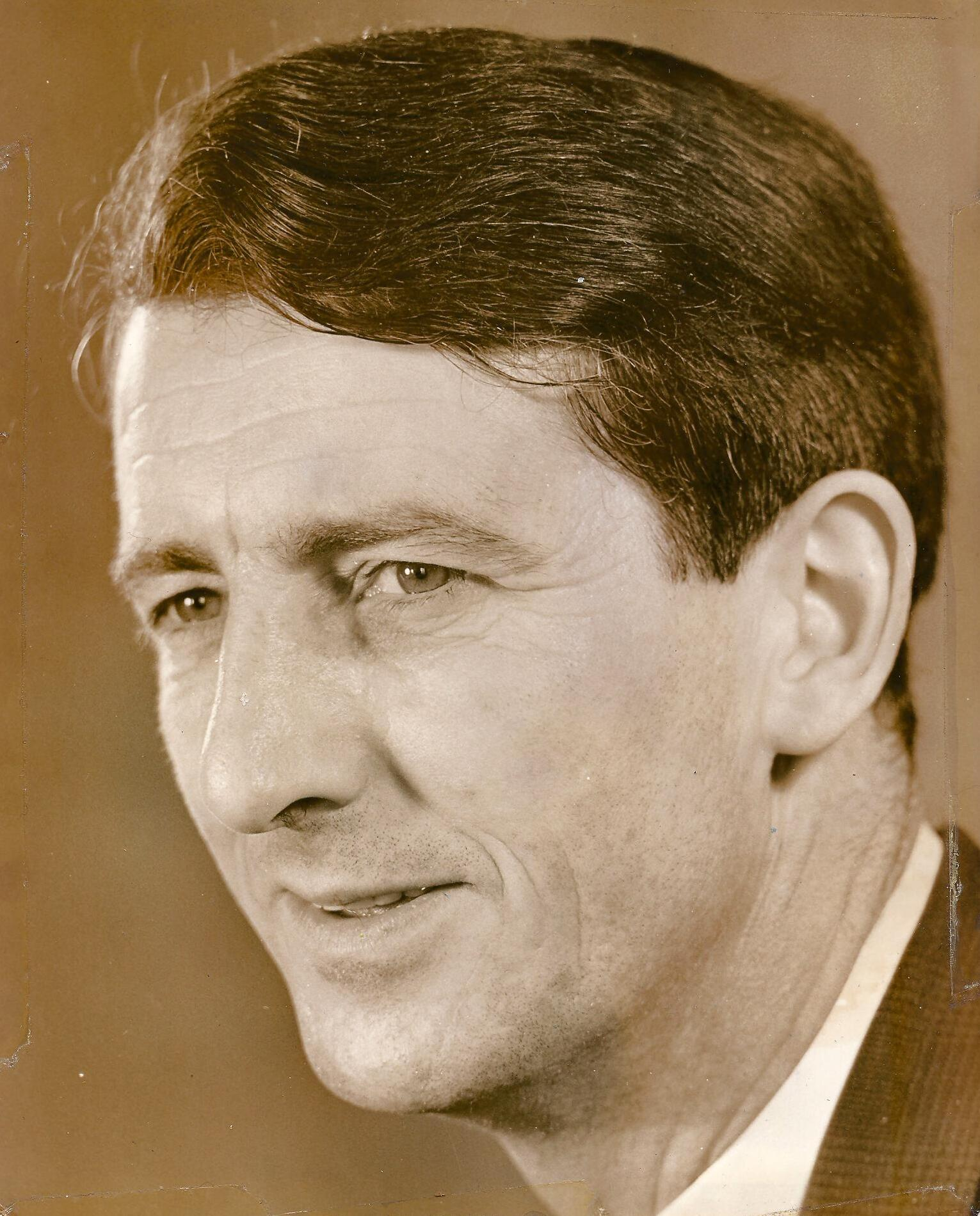
Gearóid Ó Tighearnaigh

Gerry Tierney (Gearóid Ó Tighearnaigh; IPA:ˈɟaɾˠoːdʲ oː ˈtʲɪjəɾˠn̪ˠiː) (1923–1979) was a popular bi-lingual Irish radio broadcaster for RTÉ. He hosted the radio quiz show Twenty Questions.

== Biography ==
Tierney was born in Churchtown near Mallow, County Cork, on 7 February 1923. His musical radio programme which underwent a few name changes—Musical Cavalcade, then Ceol do Pháistí, and finally Planxty Gearóid—spanned nearly 20 years from the late 1950s to the mid-1970s. He broadcast to the Irish nation every Sunday with his varying choice of music ranging from "high-" to "middle-brow" across all genres. The low timbre of his voice and his infectious laughter were unmistakable and the RTÉ radio Quiz show, Twenty Questions, which he hosted, also proved to be another firm family favourite.

Tierney died from a heart attack in January 1979, aged 55.

== Other sources ==
- Radio Telefís Éireann 'RTÉ' - Ireland's National Broadcasting Corporation
- https://stillslibrary.rte.ie
- http://gerardtierney.makinghaytheatre.ie/articles.html
- RTE Guide, November 1, 1968
- RTE Guide, May 2, 1969
- RTE Guide, October 2, 1970
- RTE Guide, April 30, 1971
- RTE Guide, March 10, 1972
- RTE Guide, April 27, 1973
- Irish plays co-written with Martin Dempsey
- Abbey Theatre archives
- www.nli.ie/pdfs/mss%20lists/074_deBurca.pdf Conradh na Gaeilge (page 112)
- Churchtown Village Renewal Trust
