= Ballads and Bards =

Canadian country music television series

- Genre: Country music
- Presented by: Reg Gibson; Jim Pirie
- Country of origin: Canada
- Original language: English
- No. of seasons: 1
- No. of episodes: 9

Production
- Running time: 15 minutes

Original release
- Network: CBC Television
- Release: July 1962 – 29 June 1963

Ballads and Bards is a Canadian country music television series that aired nationally on CBC Television in 1963.

== Premise ==
Country music is featured in this Winnipeg-produced series, adapted from the radio series Shenandoah. Hosts are musicians Reg Gibson (Swingalong) and Jim Pirie (Red River Jamboree).

== Scheduling ==
This series was initially broadcast from June 1962 on CBC's Winnipeg and Edmonton stations. The 15-minute series was broadcast nationally on CBC Saturdays at 6:30 p.m. from 4 May to 29 June 1963.
