= To Tell the Truth (Canadian game show) =

To Tell the Truth is a Canadian version of the original 1956 American game show To Tell the Truth. It was broadcast on CTV between 1962 and 1964. The show was hosted by Don Cameron and the panelists included Toby Tarnow, Robert Hall, Dorothy Cameron and Stan Helleur. It aired at 10 PM on Thursdays.
