= West Coast (TV series) =

Canadian variety show

West Coast is a Canadian variety show television series which debuted on the CTV television network in 1961.

The show was produced at the studios of CHAN-TV in Vancouver, British Columbia and mixed studio segments with filmed location footage from around British Columbia. Airing at 7:30-8:00 PM on Friday nights, it was cancelled after one season due to high costs and poor viewership. Rai Purdy was producer.
