= Bill Brady (journalist) =

Canadian journalist (1932–2025)

Bill Brady CM
- Born: Wiliam Brady; May 1, 1932; Windsor, Ontario, Canada
- Died: November 16, 2025 (aged 93); London, Ontario, Canada
- Occupations: Journalist, manager, executive

William Brady CM (May 1, 1932 – November 16, 2025) was a Canadian print and radio journalist, manager and executive who was involved with various local and national organizations.

== Early life ==
Brady was born in Windsor, Ontario on May 1, 1932, and located to London in the 1950s to work in radio broadcasting. He is regarded as a pioneer of the telephone call-in show in Canada.

== Career ==
Brady's daily radio program was on the air in the Southwestern Ontario region for more than 20 years. He also hosted a game show called Act Fast on the local television station CFPL-TV.

Beyond his capacity as a radio personality for CFPL radio in London, Brady became more involved in the management of the station, eventually, in 1983 becoming the general manager. He went on to become president of operations for the Blackburn Radio company (owners of CFPL and five other stations) in 1993. Two years later in 1995, Brady was made senior vice-president at the parent Blackburn Group company which also owned the local television station CFPL-TV and The London Free Press daily newspaper. Brady was until his death a regular freelance contributor to the op-ed pages of the Free Press.

He served as president of the Central Canada Broadcasters Association, and in 1996 he was inducted into the Canadian Broadcast Hall of Fame.

Brady also engaged in public service and was chairman of the board of University Hospital and the London Health Association. He also co-founded and was the first president of Transplant International (Canada) which seeks to expand organ retrieval and transplant awareness. Brady was also vice-president of the board and a member of the executive committee at the John P. Robarts Research Institute (London) and was also the director at the London Centre for Juvenile Diabetes Research. He also served as national director of the Canadian Heart Foundation. Brady was involved in numerous community organizations, often acting as Master of Ceremonies at various fund-raising and testimonial functions.

=== Recognition ===
In 1990, Brady received an honorary Doctor of Laws (LL.D.) from the University of Western Ontario, and in 1991, he was appointed a Member of the Order of Canada (CM), one of the highest civilian honours the country bestows upon its citizens, for his contributions to the country and community. He also received the Queen Elizabeth II Golden Jubilee Medal in 2002 and the Queen Elizabeth II Diamond Jubilee Medal in 2012.

== Personal life and death ==
The Toronto Star writer Linda Barnard is his daughter.

Brady died at a hospital in London, Ontario, on November 16, 2025, at the age of 93.
