= Hélène Baillargeon =

Canadian singer, actor and folklorist (1916–1997)

Hélène Baillargeon CM
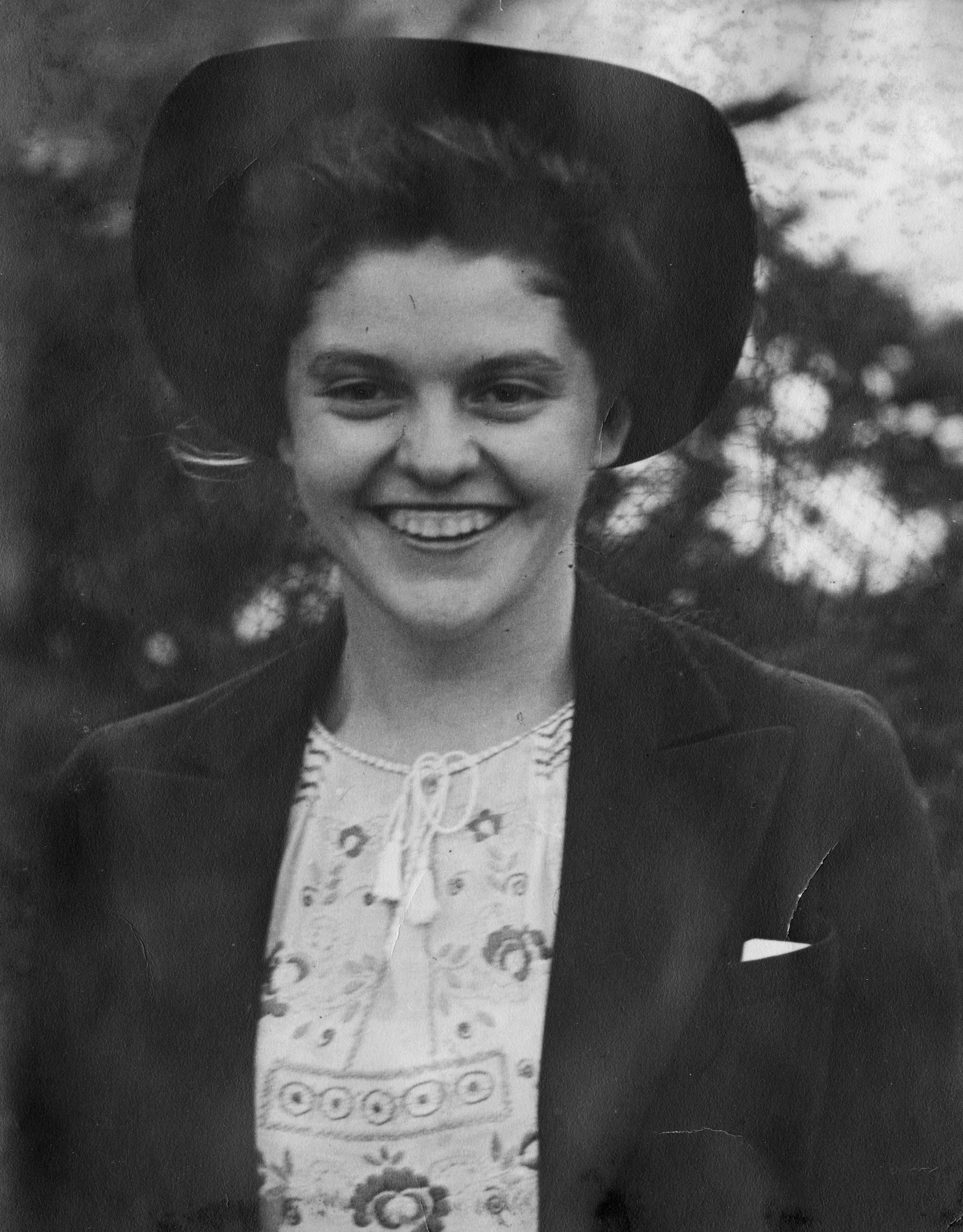
- Baillargeon in 1940
- Born: Hélène Marie Baillargeon; 28 August 1916; Saint-Martin, Quebec, Canada
- Died: 25 September 1997 (aged 81); Montreal, Quebec, Canada
- Other names: Hélène Marie Baillargeon-Côté
- Occupations: Singer; actor; folklorist
- Notable credit: Chez Hélène (1959–1973)
- Spouse: André Côté (m. 1944)

Hélène Baillargeon CM (1916–1997) was a Canadian singer, actor, and folklorist probably best known as the host of the CBC Television show Chez Hélène from 1959 to 1973.

She was born in Saint-Martin, Quebec, on 28 August 1916 and studied singing in Quebec City and New York City and then in Montreal with Alfred La Liberté. She went on to work as a researcher with Marius Barbeau at the National Museum of Canada in Ottawa (later the Canadian Museum of Civilization in Gatineau). In 1944, Baillargeon married André Côté, a Crown attorney in Montreal.

She performed and hosted shows on CBC Radio and Television such as Le réveil rural (1951–1955), Songs de chez nous (1952–1955), and Cap aux sorciers (1955–1958). Baillargeon was named to the Order of Canada in 1973. In 1974, she was appointed a Canadian citizenship court judge. She also recorded a number of collections of French-Canadian folk songs.

She died in Montreal on 25 September 1997.

== Selected discography ==
- 1955: Songs of French Canada with Alan Mills (Folkways Records)
- 1956: French Christmas Songs: Chants de Noël (Folkways Records)
- 1956: Chansons d'Acadie (Folks Songs of Acadia) (Folkways Records)
- 1961: Chantons en Français; Vol. 1, Part 1–4: French Songs for Learning French (Folkways Records)
- 1961: Chantons en Français; Vol. 2: French Songs for Learning French (Folkways Records)
