= Comparisons (TV series) =

- Genre: Documentary
- Country of origin: Canada
- Original language: English

Production
- Running time: 60 minutes
- Production company: National Film Board of Canada

Original release
- Network: CBC Television
- Release: 9 January 1959 – 25 August 1966

Comparisons is a Canadian documentary television program that aired on CBC Television from 1959 to 1963.

== Premise ==
The National Film Board of Canada produced these documentaries which compared Canadian society with that of other nations.

== Scheduling ==
This 30- to 60-minute series was broadcast sporadically from 9 January 1959 to 1 July 1963. It was rebroadcast Thursdays at 6:30 p.m. (Eastern) from 14 July to 25 August 1966.

== Episodes ==
The series included the following films, the year of which indicates the NFB production date:

- Age of Dissent: Young Men With Opinions (1959)
- Britain and Canada Debate Britain's World Leadership (1959)
- Courtship (1961)
- Four Families (1959)
- Four Religions (1960)
- Four Teachers (1961)
- Of Sport And Men (1961)
- Suburban Living: Six Solutions (1960)
