= Stewart MacPherson (broadcaster) =

Canadian radio and television broadcaster (1908–1995)

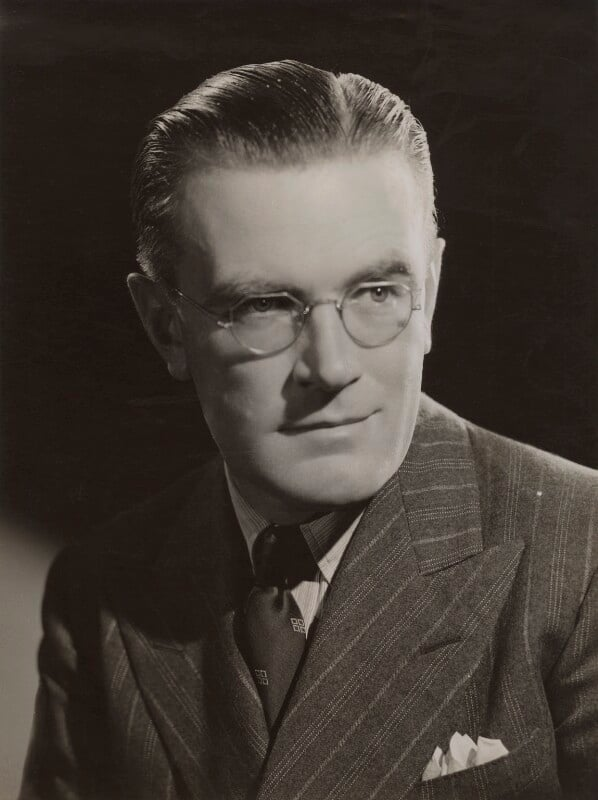
- MacPherson in 1947
- Born: Stewart Myles MacPherson; 29 October 1908; Winnipeg, Manitoba, Canada
- Died: 16 April 1995 (aged 86); Winnipeg, Manitoba, Canada
- Occupation: Radio broadcaster

Stewart Myles MacPherson (29 October 1908 – 16 April 1995) was a Canadian radio and television broadcaster, who worked extensively in Britain between the 1930s and 1950s. Initially a sports commentator, he later developed a role as a compère of radio quiz shows.

== Biography ==
MacPherson was born in Winnipeg, of Scottish ancestry. He dropped out of high school, and lived with his parents while writing occasional sports reports and refereeing. After failing an audition for local radio in Winnipeg, ice hockey player Alex Archer suggested that he travel to London to find work as a reporter on games there. He made the journey in 1936, travelling to England on a slow cattle boat.

At first he worked as a salesman in an Oxford Street store, but soon got a job at Wembley Stadium, summarising matches. He married, and then auditioned successfully for a position commentating on ice hockey matches for BBC Radio. He made his first broadcast in late 1937, and soon began commentating on other sports including speedway racing, swimming, cycling, and boxing, as well as special events such as the Lord Mayor's Show. He became a popular voice on BBC radio, becoming known as "the fastest voice in radio", and occasionally showing "a willingness to go a little beyond the BBC's rules of decorum".

He went back to Canada after the start of World War II, but found it difficult to obtain radio work, and returned to England in 1940 to work as a war correspondent for the BBC. He was assigned to the Royal Canadian Air Force and the Royal Air Force, and reported on the bombings of Cologne. Later, during the battles on the western front, he reported on the ground war, and was one of the first correspondents to enter Brussels in September 1944. On VE Day, he spoke live from a commentary point overlooking Piccadilly Circus, reporting on the scene every twenty minutes from 2 pm until 4:55 am the following day.

After the end of the war, MacPherson became a host on such radio programmes as In Town Tonight, Ignorance Is Bliss (a BBC adaptation of the American show It Pays to Be Ignorant), Down Your Way, and Twenty Questions, as well as commentating on a wide range of sports including tennis, cricket, golf, the Boat Race, and the 1948 Olympic Games. A freelance broadcaster, he also took some of his shows on tour in theatres, judged beauty competitions, appeared in advertisements, and wrote popular newspaper columns. He compered three Royal Variety Performances, published an autobiography, The Mike and I, and in 1949 was voted by Daily Mail readers as "Voice of the Year".

In 1951, after accepting an invitation from the King to present his final programme of Twenty Questions from Buckingham Palace, MacPherson and his family returned to Canada. Encouraged by Ed Murrow, he took a job at radio station WCCO in Minneapolis. When WCCO was sold by CBS in 1960, MacPherson declined a move to Los Angeles, and instead moved back to Winnipeg. There, he worked in television at CJAY-TV, as a newsreader, political reporter, and talk show host. He also made occasional return visits to Britain, recalling his memories of the war years.

MacPherson retired from broadcasting in 1974. He was inducted to the Canadian Association of Broadcasters Hall of Fame in 1989. He died in Winnipeg in 1995, aged 86 and is buried at Elmwood Cemetery.
