= Jimmy Tapp =

Canadian voice actor (1918–2004)

James Anthony Tapp (April 18, 1918 – November 20, 2004) was a Canadian broadcaster.

He began his career with closed-circuit radio broadcasts aboard HMCS Wasaga in World War II. He later became a radio announcer in Montreal. He went on to host a number of early CBC Television shows, including Flashback and The Tapp Room. During the 1960s, he was host of CTV's game show A Kin to Win and the voice for Hercules in the animated series The Mighty Hercules.

He was inducted into the Canadian Association of Broadcasters Hall of Fame on November 29, 2004.

He died on November 20, 2004, of pneumonia in Oakville, Ontario, at the age of 86.
