= Swingalong =

Canadian music television program

- Genre: Music
- Presented by: Doug Crosley
- Country of origin: Canada
- Original language: English
- No. of seasons: 1

Production
- Production location: Winnipeg
- Running time: 30 minutes

Original release
- Network: CBC Television
- Release: 3 July – 28 September 1962

Swingalong is a Canadian music television program that aired on CBC Television in 1962.

== Premise ==
This Winnipeg-produced program featured easy listening songs. Regulars included Florence Faiers and the Swingalong Chorus, with host Doug Crosley.

== Scheduling ==
This half-hour program was broadcast on Tuesdays at 4:00 p.m. (Eastern time) from 3 July to 28 September 1962.
