= Twenty Questions (Canadian game show) =

- Genre: game show
- Based on: Twenty Questions
- Presented by: Stewart MacPherson
- Country of origin: Canada
- Original language: English

Production
- Running time: 30 minutes

Original release
- Network: CTV
- Release: 4 October 1961 – 1962

Twenty Questions is a Canadian television game show, which aired on CTV in the 1961–62 television season. Produced by CJAY-TV in Winnipeg and hosted by Stewart MacPherson, the show was an adaptation of the earlier American game show Twenty Questions.

Panelists on the show included Rassy Ragland, the mother of Neil Young.

Twenty Questions was broadcast on Wednesday evenings, 19:30 in Toronto, beginning 4 October 1961. The program lasted only a single season on CTV. MacPherson, who had previously hosted a radio version of the show in Britain, subsequently went on to host a British adaptation of Twenty Questions for Associated-Rediffusion.

Les Wedman, television columnist for The Vancouver Sun, deemed the production to be a "dull, witless presentation of a parlor [sic] game".
