= Fritz Spiess =

Canadian cinematographer (1925–1998)

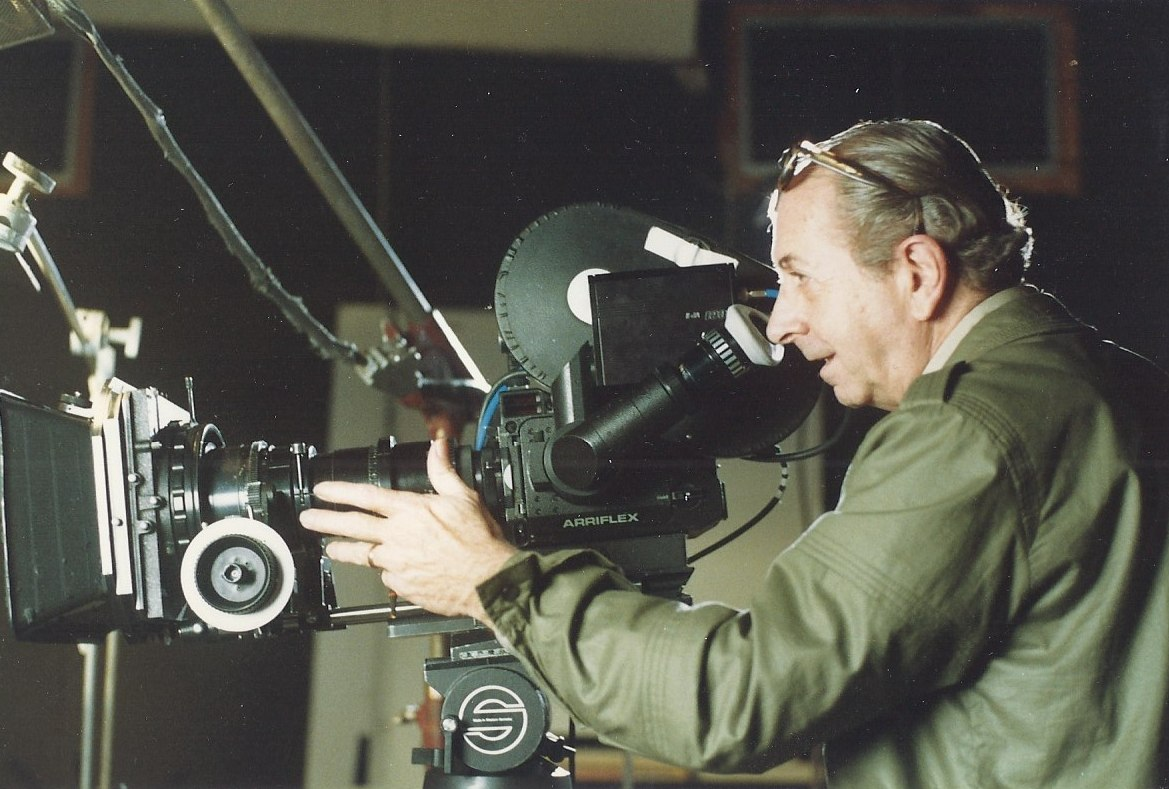
- Born: February 2, 1925; Germany
- Died: March 12, 1998 (aged 73); Toronto, Ontario, Canada
- Occupation: Cinematographer

Fritz Spiess (2 February 1925 – 12 March 1998 in Germany) was a Canadian cinematographer.

== Biography ==
Spiess studied photography in Germany and immigrated to Canada in 1951. Spiess initially worked as a still photographer until 1954 and then focused on cinematography from 1954 until his retirement in 1990. He also directed television commercials. He was a founding member of the Canadian Society of Cinematographers. Because of the many awards his commercials won and the awards that were created in his name, he became known as the "dean of Canadian cinematographers". Significant portions of his commercial cinematography legacy have been permanently archived at the University of Toronto.

=== Photography ===
Spiess' still photography featured works taken during post-war Germany and early 1950s Canada. His Canadian photos from the 1950s appeared in major publications such as Life and Mayfair. Many of these photographs are now featured at Toronto's Bulger Gallery. Eight photographs from his "Paris in Munich" 1948 photoshoot form part of the permanent collection of the Art Gallery of Ontario and were on display at the AGO in February 2012.

=== Cinematography ===
==== First Film: St. Thomas Choirboy ====
Spiess' first film was shot in 1941 when he was 16 years of age. The film was "A day in the life of a St. Thomas choirboy". Spiess was a student of the St. Thomas school in Leipzig while he was growing up. The film was initially silent, but after his death sound was added by friends and colleagues to honour his memory. The film premiered at Spiess' memorial service, held on April 19, 1998. In March 2012, portions of Spiess' 1941 film were used in an MDR documentary about the St. Thomas School on the Choir's 800th anniversary.

==== Television Commercials ====
In 1954 in Toronto, Spiess began working on TV commercials. Commercials became his primary focus and his skill and craft developed steadily. He became widely known for his innovative lighting effects and special effects, especially molten gold. Later in his career, he added directing to his skillset along with the director of photography. In total, he shot over 3,000 TV commercials for many major Canadian and international brands.

==== Fables of La Fontaine ====
In 1958, Spiess was the cinematographer of the Fables of La Fontaine, a TV series that appeared on CBC.

==== Disney Expo 67: 360 film ====
Hired by Walt Disney, Spiess flew across Canada shooting scenes for the 360-degree film that was the highlight of the Telephone pavilion at Expo 67.

=== Awards ===
- 1973 Canadian Society of Cinematographers (CSC) Bill Hilson Award (Initial Recipient) - Outstanding service contributing to the development of the motion picture industry
- 1974 CSC Annual Award for Best Cinematography in a TV Commercial
- 1979 TVB Bessies Fritz Spiess Award (Initial Recipient) Each year, the Spiess Award is given to a person who has displayed "continuing, consistent dedication to excellence in the art of the television commercial". It can be presented to a cameraman, director, producer, editor, composer, art director, copywriter or an advertiser, who has "fulfilled the set-out criteria of overall excellence".
- 1979 CSC Annual Award for Best Cinematography in a TV Commercial
- 1987 Kodak New Century Award (Initial Recipient) - Persons who have made an outstanding contribution to the art of cinematography
- 1983 Fuji Award - Extraordinary contributions to the CSC
- Various dates - Gold, Silver and Bronze Lions in Cannes and Venice
- 1999 The CSC Fritz Spiess Award for Commercial Cinematography - The CSC unveiled this new award in honour of Fritz's legacy at their 1999 Awards Gala

=== Archives ===
After his death, hundreds of his commercials and other materials were sorted and archived. Released to the public on December 12, 1999, the archives were initially and generously hosted by William F. White, a major Toronto film rental firm that Spiess had worked with for many years. The donated material is now a significant asset of the Media Commons archive at the University of Toronto.
