= Music '60 =

Canadian music variety show

- Genre: Variety
- Written by: John Aylesworth; Saul Ilson; Frank Peppiatt
- Directed by: Bill Davis
- Presented by: Bill Walker
- Country of origin: Canada
- Original language: English
- No. of seasons: 1

Production
- Producer: Norm Sedawie
- Running time: 60 minutes

Original release
- Network: CBC Television
- Release: 12 October 1959 – 11 July 1960

Music '60 is a Canadian music variety show that aired on CBC Television from 1959 to 1960.

== Premise ==
Music '60 was a brand name for two series which appeared on alternate weeks in its Monday night time slot.

Music 60 Presents the Hit Parade replaced the Cross Canada Hit Parade series. Wally Koster and Joyce Hahn continued as hosts of these episodes and were supported by regulars Bert Niosi and his orchestra, Maggie St. Clair's Hit Parade Dancers, and 20-person vocal group the Gino Silvi Singers.

Music '60 Presents The Jack Kane Show on the opposite weeks was a replacement for Music Makers '59 featuring Jack Kane and his band, with singer Sylvia Murphy. Big band music was supplemented by classical selections from such guests as Glenn Gould, Ernest MacMillan and Lois Marshall.

CBC combined the replaced series into the Music '60 banner as a cost reduction measure for its variety series. Sets and other production costs were also expected to be reduced under this new format.

== Scheduling ==
This hour-long series was broadcast Mondays at 9:30 p.m. (Eastern) from 12 October 1959 to 11 July 1960.

== Reception ==
One of the Jack Kane episodes drew internal criticism from CBC's program evaluation director Ira Dilworth who severely objected to Kane's "boot licking" towards guest Arthur Schwartz.
