= Cross Canada Barndance =

- Presented by: Evan Kemp
- Country of origin: Canada
- Original language: English
- No. of seasons: 1

Production
- Producer: Sydney Banks
- Running time: 30 minutes

Original release
- Network: CTV
- Release: October 1961 – 1962

Cross Canada Barndance is a Canadian television variety show which aired on CTV during that network's inaugural season in 1961–62.

Produced by Sydney Banks and hosted by Evan Kemp, the show aired live performances by country musicians taped at various CTV affiliate stations. The show aired Saturday nights at 11 p.m. beginning October 1961 as one of CTV's inaugural series.
