= Roy Ward Dickson =

Canadian television producer and host

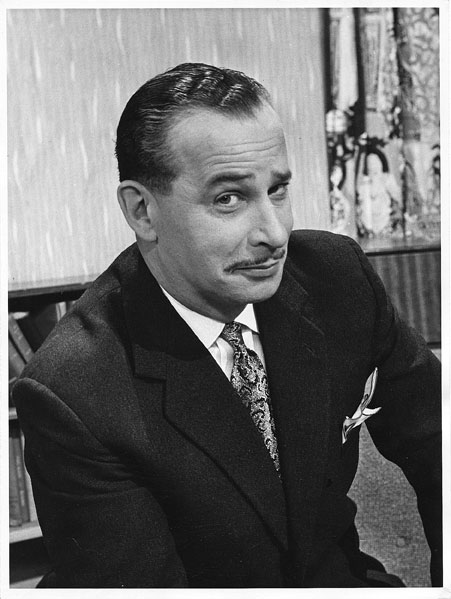
Roy in 1960, on the set of Try for Ten!

Roy Ward Dickson (August 18, 1910 – September 16, 1978), born Richard Louis del Valle, was a pioneering Canadian television producer, writer, and emcee. Dubbed King of Quiz by an Edmonton journalist, Dickson invented the game show. His first show, Professor Dick and His Question Box, debuted on radio in 1935, followed by The Quizz Club in 1936.

Born in London, UK, Dickson moved to Canada where, by 1929, he was a secondary school teacher in Winnipeg. He moved to British Columbia by 1931, working in the Vancouver Sun's advertising department. In 1934 he relocated to Ontario where he joined Toronto Star and developed his first student quizzes.

In the early 1950s, Dickson moved from radio to television with the TV show What d'you Know?, followed shortly afterwards by the world's first panel game, Claim to Fame. Over the next four decades, Roy devised and hosted numerous popular and successful television shows, in both Britain and Canada.

Among his most famous shows were the long-running Fun Parade, which successfully transitioned from radio to television. His television quiz show Take a Chance was broadcast on CTV from 1961 to 1965 where at one point 438,000 viewers participated in that program's contests. The popular TV game show Mr. and Mrs. tested couples' knowledge of each other, and which was the forerunner for dozens of similar shows. Roy invented, produced and hosted the original Canadian version of Mr and Mrs. which became a popular show in the UK throughout the 1970s and 1980s.

Dickson died at Victoria, British Columbia in 1978.

== Bibliography ==
- Dickson, Roy Ward (1977). Take a chance!: confessions of a quizmaster (First ed.). Fitzhenry & Whiteside. ISBN 978-0-88902-408-3.
