= Flashback (game show) =

Canadian quiz show television series

- Created by: John Aylesworth; Frank Peppiatt; Syd Wayne
- Presented by: Paul Soles (1962); Bill Walker (1963–1966); Jimmy Tapp (1966–1968)
- Country of origin: Canada
- Original language: English
- No. of seasons: 6

Production
- Producers: Bob Jarvis; Don Brown
- Running time: 30 minutes

Original release
- Network: CBC Television
- Release: 23 September 1962 – 16 June 1968

Flashback is a Canadian quiz show that aired on CBC Television from 1962 to 1968.

== Premise ==
A four-person panel, including one guest panelist, was given three minutes to guess a mystery fad, item or person from the past. The quiz show approach of Flashback resembled that of Front Page Challenge. The mystery topics were submitted by viewers for cash prizes, where $25 was awarded if the topic was broadcast, and $50 if the panel was unable to make a correct guess.

Paul Soles was moderator and host for the first season, succeeded by Bill Walker until 1966 after which Jimmy Tapp hosted for the remainder of the series run. The initial panelists were Maggie Morris, Allan Manings and Alan Millar. Millar was replaced by Elwy Yost in 1964, then Manings was replaced by Larry Solway in 1966. Morris remained a panelist for the entire series run.

Soles remarked that the program's intention was to foster "a pleasant sense of nostalgia." The series also catered to a younger demographic, preferring younger people as guests to support Flashback's light-hearted approach.

== Scheduling ==
The half-hour series was broadcast Sundays at 7:30 p.m. (Eastern). Its debut was 23 September 1962, and its final episode was broadcast 16 June 1968.
