= Bert Niosi =

- Born: February 10, 1909; London, Ontario, Canada
- Died: August 3, 1987 (aged 78); Toronto
- Genres: Swing; Jazz
- Occupation(s): Bandleader, musician

Bert Niosi (February 10, 1909 – August 3, 1987) was a Canadian bandleader, known as "Canada's King of Swing".

== Early life ==
Niosi was born on February 10, 1909, in London, Ontario. "As a teenager he briefly played clarinet with Guy Lombardo in Cleveland." Niosi had two brothers who also became musicians: Joe and Johnnie.

== Later life and career ==
Niosi was proficient on several instruments: clarinet, flute, saxophone, trombone, and trumpet. He formed a dance band in 1931. This began a long association with the Palais Royale dance hall in Toronto, which lasted until 1950. Here, he earned the nickname 'Canada's King of Swing'. His orchestra, and a smaller group made up of some of its members, was broadcast frequently on CBC Radio. Niosi played alto saxophone and clarinet in the small band. He was also a member of CBC radio's The Happy Gang musical series from 1952 to 1959. He died in Toronto on August 3, 1987.
