= Spence Caldwell =

Canadian television executive

- Born: Spencer Wood Caldwell; 1909; Regina, Saskatchewan, Canada
- Died: December 10, 1983 (aged 73–74); Caledon, Ontario, Canada
- Known for: Founder of the CTV Television Network

Spencer Wood Caldwell (1909 – December 10, 1983) was a Canadian broadcasting pioneer and the founder of CTV.

Amongst his notable achievements are as manager of the Dominion Network, S.W. Caldwell Ltd. (a TV and radio programme and equipment distributor), an advertising agency created to air Canadian advertisements into the broadcasting of CBS TV show Westinghouse Playhouse. Caldwell was one of the first to apply for a television station licence to the Board of Broadcast Governors, but was turned down. After being turned down for a television station, Caldwell applied for a licence to create Canada's first private television network. With the licence approved, Caldwell created CTV, Canada's first commercial TV network. Caldwell was the first President of CTV and was inducted into the Canadian Association of Broadcasters Hall of Fame.

Caldwell was killed in a road accident with a transport truck near his home in Caledon, Ontario.
