= Showdown (Canadian game show) =

Canadian television game show

- Genre: game show
- Presented by: Paul Hanover
- Country of origin: Canada
- Original language: English
- No. of seasons: 1

Production
- Running time: 30 minutes
- Production company: Screen Gems

Original release
- Network: CTV
- Release: 5 October 1961 – 1962

Showdown is a Canadian television game show, which aired on CTV in the network's inaugural 1961–62 season.

Hosted by Hamilton radio broadcaster Paul Hanover, the program featured contestants competing to answer general knowledge questions on music. Showdown was produced for CTV by Screen Gems (now Sony Pictures Television) and CFCF-TV (one of several co-productions between the network and Screen Gems) and was broadcast each Thursday at 7:30 PM beginning 5 October 1961.
