= Magistrate's Court (TV series) =

- Genre: Drama
- Starring: Roy Jacques
- Country of origin: Canada
- Original language: English

Production
- Producer: Rai Purdy
- Running time: 30 minutes

Original release
- Network: Syndicated
- Release: 1963 – 1969

Magistrate's Court is a Canadian television series airing weekdays in syndication from 1963–1969 on the CBC. The show is a dramatization of the day-to-day life of a police magistrate, portrayed by Roy Jacques. The series was produced by Rai Purdy.
