= A Kin to Win =

- Genre: game show
- Directed by: Ralph Mellanby
- Presented by: Jimmy Tapp
- Country of origin: Canada
- Original language: English
- No. of seasons: 1 (on CTV)

Production
- Running time: 30 minutes

Original release
- Network: CFCF-TV/CTV
- Release: 2 October 1961 – 1964

A Kin to Win is a Canadian television game show initially produced in Montreal in 1961, then aired on the CTV network in 1962. Jimmy Tapp was the program's host.

== Production ==
The series was produced by a Canadian subsidiary of NBC, led by Nick Nicholson and E. Roger Muir. Episodes were recorded in Montreal in the studios of CTV affiliate CFCF-TV at a cost of $2500 (CA$) apiece.

== Premise ==
Each round of the game consisted of a competition between two families. Fathers of each family acted as team leaders, coaching the other family members. Quiz questions were posed to the players. When answered correctly, they earned a symbol to be added to a square board. A family won after successfully placing four symbols in a row, receiving a designated Prize Chest and proceeding to a bonus prize round known as the Big Plus. The winning family proceeded to a new round, competing against another family.

== Broadcast ==
Initially, the series was broadcast locally in Montreal on CFCF-TV in the early evenings (6:00 p.m.) starting on 2 October 1961. The series was also broadcast on CJSS-TV in Cornwall, Ontario.

Distribution through the full CTV network began from 14 January 1962 and continued until July 1962. Episodes were seen on weekday afternoons at varying times depending on the market (e.g. 1:30 p.m. in Toronto, 4:00 p.m. in Ottawa and Montreal). A weekly Sunday evening episode was also broadcast, typically at 7:30 p.m.

CTV did not renew the series for the 1962-1963 national schedule, although episodes continued to be broadcast locally on CFCF-TV at least until May 1964.

According to Ross Bagwell, an NBC program developer who worked on A Kin to Win, the series was a forerunner of the American-based game show Family Feud.

== Reception ==
Jeremy Brown, television critic for the Toronto Star, deemed the debut on CTV to be "boring, trite, badly paced, lacking in suspense and incredibly bland."
