= 20/20 (Canadian TV program) =

20/20 is a Canadian half-hour television documentary program which aired on CBC Television between April 22, 1962, and September 24, 1967. 20/20 was broadcast in the daytime in various timeslots. The program featured episodes about life in Canada, and was narrated by Harry Mannis and produced by Thom Benson (1962–63) and Richard Knowles (1963–67).

It pre-dates 20/20, the American program, which debuted in 1978.
