= A Case for the Court =

- Created by: Allan King
- Starring: Gil Christy
- Country of origin: Canada
- Original language: English

Production
- Producers: George Dick; Milan Chvostek
- Running time: 30 minutes

Original release
- Network: CBC
- Release: 1960 – 1962

A Case for the Court is a weekly CBC Television show that ran from July 1960 to September 1962.

The show was produced in cooperation with the Canadian Bar Association, involving the enactment of fictional criminal and civil cases using actual judges and lawyers.
