= People in Conflict =

People in Conflict is an afternoon program that aired on CTV Television Network every weekday from October 1, 1962 through September 11, 1970. It ran for half an hour and covered two different stories of real people suffering from emotional crises, helped by Rosemary Brown and other panelists. It was originally produced in the Vancouver CTV affiliate CHAN-TV but was moved to Montreal's CFCF-TV in the late 1960s to take advantage of the new colour television cameras. The show was later produced in Australia by John Pond and Channel 7.
