= The Pierre Berton Show =

Canadian television program, 1962–1973

The Pierre Berton Show is a television show on CHCH TV, hosted by Pierre Berton. It ran from 1962 to 1973, and Berton regularly interviewed important artists, actors, and other public figures. His interviewees included Malcolm X in 1965, Lenny Bruce in 1966, and the only known interview with Bruce Lee in 1971.
