= Take a Chance (Canadian game show) =

- Genre: game show
- Presented by: Roy Ward Dickson
- Country of origin: Canada
- Original language: English
- No. of seasons: 5

Production
- Production locations: CFTO-TV Studios; Scarborough, Ontario
- Running time: 30 minutes

Original release
- Network: CTV
- Release: 9 October 1961 – 1965

Take a Chance is a Canadian quiz show by Roy Ward Dickson adapted from radio. It was one of the first series on CTV when the network began in 1961. The program was produced in the Toronto suburb of Scarborough at CFTO-TV studios and was broadcast Mondays at 9:30 PM (EST). Sheila Billing, the Miss Toronto pageant winner of 1955, was a co-host of the program.

On its premiere, Toronto Star television critic Jeremy Brown deemed the show to be "painful to watch" and "dreary", complaining that the program lacked structure, suspense and substantial prize monies.

At one point, 438,000 viewers participated in the contests by submitting chewing gum wrappers as Chiclets was the program's key sponsor.

Take a Chance aired until 1965.
