= Chez Hélène =

- Genre: Children's television series
- Starring: Hélène Baillargeon; Madeline Kronby
- Voices of: Corinne Orr
- Country of origin: Canada
- Original language: French/English
- No. of seasons: 14
- No. of episodes: 4000+

Production
- Running time: 15 minutes

Original release
- Network: CBC
- Release: 26 October 1959 – 25 May 1973

Chez Hélène is a children's television series produced by and broadcast on CBC Television. The 15-minute weekday program was broadcast on the English television network to provide viewers with exposure to the French language.

The program was produced at CBC's Montreal studios. It began its 14-season run on 26 October 1959, with the final program airing 25 May 1973.

Hélène Baillargeon portrayed the title role. Other cast members were Madeline Kronby who portrayed the bilingual Louise, and a mouse puppet named Suzie who generally spoke English. Corinne Orr provided the voice for Suzie.

In terms of children's series, the program remained popular in its final season, with a reported 437,000 viewers recorded by BBM in November 1972. But CBC executives cancelled the series, claiming that it had run its course, and that the network's broadcasts of Sesame Street would incorporate five minutes of French-language segments per episode. By the end of the 1970s, a newer program, Passe-Partout started airing on CBC Television's French counterpart, Ici Radio-Canada Télé.
