= Telepoll =

- Genre: talk show
- Presented by: Royce Frith
- Voices of: Russ Thompson
- Country of origin: Canada
- Original language: English

Production
- Running time: 60 minutes

Original release
- Network: CTV
- Release: 3 December 1961 – 1965

Telepoll is a Canadian talk show television series which aired on CTV between 1961 and 1965. It was hosted by Royce Frith.

== Premise ==
Each week, a guest panel was invited to discuss a current event. Pre-selected viewers were also polled and their responses were tabulated and presented on the next show. Each episode cost an estimated $3500 (CA$), among the most expensive domestic CTV productions. CNCP Telecommunications was Telepoll's sponsor.

Peter Jennings, then based at CTV's Ottawa affiliate CJOH-TV, was a correspondent for the program.

== Notable episodes ==
Glen Haw, a lawyer for the Jehovah's Witnesses sect appeared on 14 January 1961 to discuss their doctrine against blood transfusions. Haw stormed off the set following a statement by Kildare Dobbs, another panelist on that episode.

The newspaper industry was the subject of a 3 January 1965 episode. The poll on that occasion found that three-quarters of respondents felt that Canada's papers did a "good job" covering the news, although 55% of those polled indicated the papers placed too much emphasis on sensationalism.

== Broadcast ==
Telepoll's debut was on 3 December 1961, two months after the CTV network began its broadcasts.
