= CTV Television Network =

Canadian television network

- Type: Terrestrial television network
- Country: Canada
- Broadcast area: Canada parts of the United States via cable or antenna
- Affiliates: See § CTV stations
- Headquarters: 9 Channel Nine Court, Agincourt, Scarborough, Toronto, Ontario, Canada

Programming
- Language: English
- Picture format: 1080i HDTV

Ownership
- Owner: BCE Inc.
- Parent: Bell Media
- Key people: Sean Cohan; President, Bell Media
- Sister channels: CTV2; CTV News Channel; BNN Bloomberg; CP24; CTV Comedy Channel; CTV Drama Channel; CTV Life Channel; CTV Nature Channel; CTV Sci-Fi Channel; CTV Speed Channel; CTV Wild Channel; Oxygen; USA Network; Noovo (French language)

History
- Launched: October 1, 1961; 65 years ago
- Founder: Spence Caldwell
- Former names: Canadian Television Network (CTN) (pre-launch name)

Links
- Website: crave.ca/en/ctv

The CTV Television Network, commonly known as CTV, is a Canadian English-language terrestrial television network. Launched in 1961 and acquired by BCE Inc. in 2000, CTV is Canada's largest privately owned television network and is now a division of the Bell Media subsidiary of BCE. It is Canada's largest privately or commercially owned network consisting of 22 owned-and-operated stations nationwide and two privately owned affiliates, and has consistently been placed as Canada's top-rated network in total viewers and in key demographics since 2002, after several years trailing the rival Global Television Network in key markets.

Bell Media also operates additional CTV-branded properties, including the 24-hour national cable news network CTV News Channel and the secondary CTV 2 television system.

There has never been an official full name corresponding to the initials "CTV" (though TV viewers, critics, & those within the industry understand it to be short-hand for "Canadian Television"; in fact, a major 1998 network rebranding campaign explicitly paired the CTV logo with the tagline "Canadian Television," cementing the association in the minds of TV viewers); prior to CTV's launch in 1961, it was given the proposed branding of "Canadian Television Network" (CTN), but that branding was dropped before the network's launch when the Canadian Broadcasting Corporation (CBC) objected to it, claiming exclusive rights to the term "Canadian".

== History ==
=== Formation ===
In 1958, Prime Minister John Diefenbaker's government passed the Broadcasting Act, which established the Board of Broadcast Governors (BBG), a forerunner to the Canadian Radio-television and Telecommunications Commission (CRTC), as the governing body of Canadian broadcasting, effectively ending the Canadian Broadcasting Corporation's (CBC) dual role as regulator and broadcaster. The new board's first act was to take applications for "second" television stations in Halifax, Montreal (in both English and French), Ottawa, Toronto, Winnipeg, Calgary, Edmonton, and Vancouver in response to an outcry for an alternative to the CBC's television service. Calgary and Edmonton were served by privately owned CBC affiliates; the other six markets by CBC owned-and-operated stations (O&Os).

In order of their first sign-on, the newly-licensed stations were:

- CFCN-TV Calgary (September 9, 1960)
- CHAN-TV Vancouver (October 31, 1960)
- CJAY-TV Winnipeg (November 12, 1960)
- CFTO-TV Toronto (December 31, 1960)
- CJCH-TV Halifax (January 1, 1961)
- CFCF-TV Montreal (English; January 20, 1961)
- CFTM-TV Montreal (French; February 19, 1961)
- CJOH-TV Ottawa (March 12, 1961)
- CBXT Edmonton (October 1, 1961)

The first eight stations were privately owned; the Edmonton station was a CBC O&O, thus CFRN-TV, the existing local station which had launched in 1954, would lose its CBC affiliation once CBXT signed on.

Even before his station was licensed, John W. H. Bassett, the chief executive of the ultimately successful Toronto applicant Baton Aldred Rogers Broadcasting, had expressed interest in participating in the creation of a second television network, "of which we see the Toronto station as anchor". Indeed, Baton had already begun quietly contacting the successful applicants in other cities to gauge their interest in forming a cooperative group to share Canadian programming among the stations. This led to the July 1960 formation of the Independent Television Organization (ITO), consisting of the eight newly licensed private stations and CFRN, each having one vote in the ITO's operations regardless of the size of its audience (CFTM, being a French-language station and therefore having little reason to collaborate with the other stations, would soon withdraw from the group; it would later emerge as the flagship of the first private French-language network, TVA). The ITO soon resolved to apply for a network licence to link these second stations.

However, the ITO faced opposition from Spence Caldwell, a former CBC executive and one of the unsuccessful applicants for the Toronto licence, who had first approached the BBG in April 1960 to pitch a second-station network proposal of his own. Under his plan, at least 51% of the shares of the network would be owned by various prominent Bay Street investors who had previously backed his Toronto station bid; only 49% would be reserved for the network's affiliates to purchase, if they wished. The BBG – and particularly its chair Andrew Stewart (who at the time also served as the president of the University of Alberta) – was not in favour of a station-owned network, fearing that any such network would be dominated by Toronto's CFTO. Although it did not immediately approve Caldwell's proposal, it soon set several conditions on such a network that effectively made Caldwell's group the only feasible applicant.

That fall, the Caldwell group (now named the Canadian Television Network, or CTN) and the ITO faced off in a series of meetings with the BBG. The ITO decided not to follow through with a formal network application, but the stations – particularly Baton, which said it had no interest in participating in CTN and believed it could still be successful without one – continued to indicate various concerns with the viability of Caldwell's proposal. Ultimately, the BBG granted a licence to CTN, conditional on securing the affiliation of six of the eight ITO stations.

Baton's opposition to the CTN reversed in early 1961, soon after CFTO won the broadcast rights to the Canadian Football League Eastern Conference for the 1961 and 1962 seasons. Baton's original plan was to operate a temporary network to distribute the games incorporating CFTO, other independent stations, and CBC affiliates in smaller markets (assuming the public network released its affiliates to carry the game). Although the plan was neither officially rejected or approved, various uncertainties eventually led John Bassett to decide to sign an affiliation agreement with CTN instead to ensure the games would air. Most of the other second stations followed suit, with the exception of CHAN in Vancouver, which agreed to carry several network programs but never officially signed on as an affiliate for the duration of the Caldwell era, yet nonetheless would later claim to have been a "charter member" of the network.

=== Early years ===
The network finally launched as the CTV Television Network on October 1, 1961. (Note: There may be some confusion about the network's launch date due to a celebration of "50 years of local news" held by local CTV and A-Channel stations in April 2008, particularly as there were a handful of cases where the event was erroneously referred to as a "50th anniversary". Neither the network nor any local CTV-owned station launched in 1958, although some of the stations that later joined CTV launched earlier in the 1950s. The celebration was not timed to any particular anniversary but rather to a CRTC review of regulations for local television stations also held that month.) The CBC had objected to the network's initial name, apparently claiming it had exclusive rights to the term "Canadian", and therefore the letters "CTV" have no official expanded meaning.

The CTV network's first night on-air began with Harry Rasky's promotional documentary on the new network. That was followed by a fall season preview program.

CTV's initial 1961–1962 season began with the following programs, five of which were Canadian productions:

- The Andy Griffith Show (United States, CBS)
- Checkmate (United States, CBS)
- Cross Canada Barndance (Canada)
- Maigret (United Kingdom, BBC)
- The Rifleman (United States, ABC)
- Showdown (Canada)
- Sing Along With Mitch (United States, NBC)
- Take a Chance, a quiz show by Roy Ward Dickson adapted from radio (Canada)
- Top Cat (United States, ABC)
- Twenty Questions (Canada)
- West Coast (Canada)
- Whiplash (Australia, ATN-7)

Other series such as Telepoll and A Kin to Win were introduced later in the inaugural season.

At first, flagship CFTO was the only station that carried programming live. During CBC's off-hours, CTV used CBC's microwave system to send programming to the rest of the country on tape delay. Eventually, a second microwave channel opened up, enabling live programming from coast to coast.

The Caldwell-led management team immediately ran into financial trouble, and relations between the network and its stations were not smooth at first since CTV had essentially been the product of a forced marriage. For example, most of the rights to American programming rested with the ITO, not CTV. In many cases, CTV found itself competing with its own stations for the rights to programming.

=== Reorganization and expansion ===
Caldwell's departure in 1965 did little to alleviate the situation, and CTV soon found itself on the verge of bankruptcy. In 1966, the network's affiliates (which by this time included CJON-TV in St. John's, CKCO-TV in Kitchener, CHAB-TV/CHRE-TV in Moose Jaw/Regina, and the network's first and only U.S. affiliate, WNYP-TV in Jamestown, New York) sought permission to buy the network and run it as a cooperative. The BBG was initially skeptical of the proposal. Since CFTO was by far the largest and richest station (it was more than double the size of the next-largest station, Montreal's CFCF-TV), the BBG feared that CFTO would dominate CTV if the stations were allowed to buy the network. To alleviate these concerns, the affiliates promised that each station owner would have one vote regardless of its audience share. The board readily approved the proposal, and by the start of the 1966–67 season, the stations owned their network. The network also began broadcasting in colour on September 1, 1966.

By the mid-1970s, CTV had expanded its footprint across Canada, mostly by twinstick arrangements in smaller cities, and with CBC affiliates switching to CTV once the CBC opened its own stations or added rebroadcasters of nearby O&O stations. In a unique twist, the original Saskatchewan affiliate, CHAB/CHRE, was bought by the CBC in 1969 (and eventually changed its calls to CBKT, with the Regina station as the main station), allowing Regina's original station, CKCK-TV, to join CTV. Its attempt to expand to the United States ended when Buffalo's three network affiliates threatened legal action, forcing WNYP off the air.

CTV made a name for itself in news coverage when it convinced star CBC news anchor Lloyd Robertson to switch networks in 1976. (Robertson served as the network's main anchorman until 2011). Its weekly newsmagazine series, W5, has been a fixture on the network since 1966, predating the similar American program 60 Minutes by two years.

In the 1970s, CTV often bought rights to pop and rock songs to serve as theme music for its programming, rather than commissioning original themes. Most notably, W5 used an instrumental portion of Supertramp's "Fool's Overture", Canada AM used an instrumental version of The Moody Blues' "Ride My See-Saw", the game show Definition used Quincy Jones' "Soul Bossa Nova" and the CTV Movie used the Keith Mansfield instrumental "Statement" from the KPM Musichouse library.

For most of its first four decades, CTV did not have what could be considered a main schedule outside of news programming. The differences were enough that Ottawa's CJOH used a rebroadcaster in Cornwall to feed cable systems in Montreal from the early 1980s through the mid-1990s despite the presence of CFCF; the CJOH rebroadcaster reached the western portion of the Montreal area.

=== Conflict and consolidation ===
CTV's cooperative structure regularly led to conflicts between the network's owner-affiliates. In particular, the owners of CFCF, CJOH, and especially CHAN felt that Baton Broadcasting, owners of flagship CFTO in Toronto, dominated production of network programming.

In the mid-1980s, Baton began a drive to take over CTV by buying as many affiliates as possible. Having already bought CFQC-TV in Saskatoon in 1971, Baton purchased additional stations in Saskatchewan – including CTV affiliates CKCK-TV Regina, CICC-TV Yorkton, and CIPA-TV Prince Albert – in 1986. Baton then purchased CJOH in 1988, followed by the MCTV and Huron Broadcasting stations, which included four CTV affiliates in Northern Ontario, in 1990.

One caveat, however, was the "one owner, one vote" provision of the cooperative's bylaws. Any acquisition of one station by an existing station owner triggered an automatic redistribution of the acquired station's shares among the other owners. As a result, even though it owned 11 of CTV's 24 affiliates, Baton still had only had one vote out of eight.

Around the same time, several CTV owner-affiliates were expanding their holdings outside of the network. CHAN owner Western International Communications purchased Selkirk Communications and Allarcom, which together owned several independent stations in Alberta and Ontario. CHUM Limited, owner of the CTV-affiliated ATV system serving the Maritimes, already owned independent station CITY-TV in Toronto, and by this point had begun launching national cable channels like MuchMusic. Even Baton added some stations outside of CTV, with the purchase or launch of three independent stations in southwestern Ontario in 1992–93. It also began competing with the network for some program acquisitions in 1992, and in 1994 launched the Baton Broadcast System (BBS) as a parallel programming brand for both its CTV affiliates and independent stations.

After several years of contentious negotiations between the eight remaining owner-affiliates, by late 1992 they had reached an agreement to recapitalize the network, and provide a path for a single company to eventually take control. The restructuring took effect in January 1993, and CTV converted from a cooperative to a corporation. Seven of the owner-affiliates invested equally, yielding a 14.3% stake in the network for each; however, Newfoundland Broadcasting, owner of CJON, decided not to invest further and effectively relinquished its vote, reducing the number of active voting members to seven. (Note: Newfoundland Broadcasting retained 100 common shares in CTV (out of approximately 14 million outstanding after the restructuring) until the completion of the Baton acquisition.) As part of the restructuring, the stations also agreed to reduce the number of hours of network programming, allowing Baton and WIC to program more of their stations' schedules with their own acquisitions.

The ribbons logo used from 1998 to 2011.

In 1996, Baton acquired CFCN from Rogers Communications. Significantly, Baton also acquired Rogers' CTV vote. It also started a joint venture with Electrohome, owner of CFRN and CKCO. As part of the deal, Baton was allowed to vote Electrohome's shares in addition to its own. The following year, Baton acquired Electrohome's share of the joint venture, and separately acquired ATV from CHUM. This gave Baton a 57.2% controlling interest in the network, triggering a put option allowing the remaining affiliates, WIC (which by this time owned both CHAN and CFCF) and Moffat (owner of CKY), to sell their CTV shares to Baton without selling their stations, which they did. Baton was now full owner of the CTV network and immediately began plastering the CTV brand across its stations, even on non-network programming, and dropped its secondary BBS brand. The company changed its name to CTV Inc. in 1998, and eventually acquired two of the final three large-market stations, CKY and CFCF (it replaced the third, CHAN, as discussed below).

CTV has attracted some controversy in the past because of cutbacks to its small-market stations. In the late 1990s, cuts were made to the news staff and productions at CTV's two small-market Saskatchewan stations, CICC-TV in Yorkton and CIPA-TV in Prince Albert. These stations currently simulcast supper-hour and late-night news from CKCK and CFQC respectively, placing local inserts into the newscasts. Similarly, the four Maritime stations, known collectively as CTV Atlantic (then known as ATV), and the four Northern Ontario stations, known collectively as CTV Northern Ontario (then known as MCTV), each had their local news production cut back in the early 2000s to one single centrally produced newscast for each region, with only brief inserts for news of strictly local interest. This was a controversial move in all of the affected communities, especially in Northern Ontario where MCTV's newscasts were the only locally oriented news programs in those markets.

=== Bell Canada era ===
Updated CTV logo for the 2018–19 television season; the basic design of this logo, with minor modifications along the way, has been in use since 1966.

In 2000, typical of the ownership consolidation trend at the time, BCE Inc. acquired CTV, Netstar Communications, and The Globe and Mail newspaper, combining them into a media division known as Bell Globemedia (BGM). BGM also subsequently acquired a minority share in the French-language network TQS, which broadcasts in Quebec.

CTV has legally been a "television service" in the eyes of the CRTC since 2000, when it allowed its network licence to expire. CBC, Radio-Canada, TVA and Aboriginal Peoples Television Network are the only official television networks in Canada (CTV was issued a separate network licence in 2001 to continue to provide programming to CJON St John's, CHFD Thunder Bay, CJBN Kenora, and CITL Lloydminster).

CTV lost significant coverage in British Columbia and Newfoundland and Labrador at the beginning of the 21st century, starting with a major television realignment in Vancouver. In 2000, Canwest Global bought the television stations of Western International Communications, which owned long-standing CTV affiliates CHAN in Vancouver and CHEK-TV in Victoria. A year later, after its CTV contract ran out, Canwest made CHAN the Global owned-and-operated station for British Columbia, taking advantage of CHAN's massive network of repeaters that cover 97% of the province. CTV shifted its programming to CIVT-TV, an independent station it already owned. Unlike CHAN, CIVT has only one transmitter covering the metropolitan areas of Vancouver and Victoria, and has to rely on cable and satellite to reach the rest of the province. CIVT is either carried on a higher channel number or unavailable altogether in the Mountain Time Zone portion of British Columbia, where CTV relies on CFCN-DT or CFRN-DT as its main carriers.

Meanwhile, in 2002, CJON-TV (known as "NTV") in St. John's dropped its 38-year CTV affiliation after the network attempted to alter its affiliation agreement in a way that Newfoundland Broadcasting found unfair. Since joining CTV, CJON had aired the base network schedule essentially for free since CTV paid it for the airtime. The station then bought additional CTV programming and sold all advertising. However, CTV tried to make CJON pay for the base schedule as well, with no possibility of airtime payments. It also increased the fees for additional CTV programming beyond what CJON claimed it could pay. Newfoundland Broadcasting also did not want to continue to carry CTV's national advertising during these programs. At the start of the 2002–03 season, CJON became an independent station and dropped most CTV programming except for national newscasts; in exchange, it provides news coverage of Newfoundland and Labrador events to CTV. In recent years, all of CTV's non-news programming has disappeared from the station, and since then virtually all primetime programs aired on that station are from rival Global. CTV does not currently have a de facto affiliate in that province, with most Newfoundlanders having to rely on cable and satellite (usually from CTV Atlantic) for its programming.

In September 2005, CTV announced an agreement with MTV Networks that saw the launch of MTV Canada.

In July 2006, CTV parent Bell Globemedia announced plans to acquire CHUM Limited, itself a former partner in CTV (via ATV), and at that point one of Canada's largest broadcasters. While CTVglobemedia kept CHUM's radio stations along with the A-Channel television stations and most of CHUM's specialty channels, the Citytv stations were sold off to Rogers as required by the conditions the CRTC placed upon CTV when approving the CHUM purchase. Bell Globemedia was renamed CTVglobemedia on January 1, 2007. In March 2009, CTV became the first Canadian television network to offer its programming online in high definition.

CTV affiliate CHFD in Thunder Bay, Ontario left the network on February 12, 2010, after being unable to reach an agreement on new affiliation terms; CHFD instead became a full-time Global affiliate. CFTO was offered as part of the basic package to Thunder Bay cable subscribers for the duration of the 2010 Winter Olympics; the station had otherwise been available only on the digital cable timeshifting package, leaving CTV without a presence on basic cable in the market.

On September 10, 2010, BCE Inc. announced it would purchase the remaining shares of CTVglobemedia for $1.3 billion (CAD). On April 1, 2011, CTVglobemedia was officially renamed Bell Media. On December 1, 2011, CJBN-TV in Kenora, Ontario dropped all CTV programming and became a full Global station, adopting a schedule similar to nearby Global station CKND-DT in Winnipeg. The move left CITL-DT in Lloydminster as the sole remaining CTV affiliate not owned by the network until 2014. It was announced in June 2014, that CKPR-DT in Thunder Bay, Ontario would change affiliations from CBC to CTV on September 1, 2014, resulting in Thunder Bay having a CTV affiliate again.

On May 20, 2015, Corus Entertainment announced an agreement with Bell Media to switch its three CBC affiliates in Ontario to CTV: CHEX-DT Peterborough, CHEX-TV-2 Oshawa, and CKWS-DT Kingston. The affiliation switch went into effect on August 31, 2015. The stations would later become owned-and-operated Global affiliates on August 27, 2018, following the end of CTV's program supply agreements with the stations and Corus' acquisition of Global's former parent company Shaw Media in 2016.

On May 1, 2026, the CTV website and apps were decommissioned, with users redirected to Bell Media's streaming service Crave.

== Programming ==
CTV broadcasts a daily networked schedule. Similarly to its competitors, most of the network's first-run programming consists of programs acquired from—and usually aired simultaneously with—U.S. networks, with the network having currently or previously been the Canadian broadcaster of series such as American Idol, The Amazing Race, The Big Bang Theory, Blue Bloods, Castle, Grey's Anatomy, The Good Doctor, The Masked Singer, and The Voice. It has also had success with Canadian-made shows such as Corner Gas, Children Ruin Everything, Degrassi: The Next Generation, Due South, The Eleventh Hour, Flashpoint, The Listener, Motive, Sullivan's Crossing, and Transplant, as well as reality series adaptations The Amazing Race Canada, Canadian Idol, MasterChef Canada, and The Traitors Canada.

The network's daytime lineup has generally featured the American series Live with Kelly and Mark and The View, the original programs The Social and The Good Stuff with Mary Berg, and reruns of library programming. CTV also produces a daily entertainment news program, eTalk.

Local and national news programming is provided by the CTV News division; national news programming consists of the flagship CTV National News and the Sunday morning talk show Question Period. Most CTV stations broadcast local evening and late-night newscasts on weekdays, with some airing noon-hour newscasts as well. Your Morning airs as the network's weekday morning show, with a national edition broadcast from Toronto for CTV stations on the east coast, and local editions produced by the news departments of CTV stations on the west coast.

=== Sports programming ===
Historically, CTV Sports existed as a stand-alone division; with CTV's purchase of cable network TSN in 2001, TSN has assumed responsibility for all sports output on CTV since.

In early 2005, CTV was part of the consortium that won the Canadian broadcast rights to Vancouver 2010 Winter Olympics hosted by Canada itself and the London 2012 Summer Olympics. CBC had consistently won Olympic broadcast rights from the 1996 Summer Olympics through to the 2008 Summer Olympics. CTV and V (now Noovo and previously TQS) were the primary broadcasters, with TSN, RDS and Sportsnet providing supplementary coverage. CTV promised to broadcast 22 hours per day of event coverage during the 2012 Olympics; regular CTV programming was reallocated to CTV's secondary television system CTV Two during the Olympics.

On May 22, 2007, it was announced that CTV had acquired the broadcast rights to the National Football League early-afternoon Sunday games, the full NFL playoffs, and the Super Bowl, starting with the 2007 NFL season, effectively ending a lengthy association between the NFL and Global. CTV's NFL broadcasts are simulcast from the respective U.S. broadcaster, with TSN producing supplemental studio programming (such as NFL on CTV Live) when warranted.

During the 2024 CFL season, CTV exclusively aired 7 CFL games during Saturday afternoons in the Fall. CTV also simulcast the Eastern Semi-final, the Eastern Final and the 111th Grey Cup with TSN.

== CTV high-definition and digital transition ==

CTV carries its high-definition feed broadcasting at 1080i. The following CTV stations are available in HD on digital terrestrial television (DTT):

Station	City	Pre-transition digital terrestrial channel	DTT launch date	Post-transition DTT channel	BDU Carriage launch date	Notes
CFTO-DT	Toronto	40 (9.1)	2005	40 (9.1)	November 19, 2003	Nationally on satellite
CIVT-DT	Vancouver	33 (32.1)	2006	32 (32.1)	June 1, 2004	Nationally on Bell TV
CFCN-DT	Calgary	36 (4.1)	January 8, 2009	29 (4.1)	Shaw: January 8, 2009	Also available on Bell TV
CFCF-DT	Montreal	51 (12.1)	January 28, 2011	12 (12.1)	Vidéotron: December 1, 2009	Also available on Bell TV
CJOH-DT	Ottawa	─	2011	13 (13.1)	Vidéotron: December 1, 2009	
CFRN-DT	Edmonton	─	2011	47 (3.1)	Telus TV: February 2011	Also available on Bell TV
CKCO-DT	Kitchener	─	September 1, 2011	13 (13.1)	Rogers: September 2011	Also available on Bell TV
CKY-DT	Winnipeg	─	September 1, 2011	7 (7.1)	MTS: January 2010	Also available on Bell TV
CJCH-DT	Halifax	─	September 1, 2011	48 (5.1)	Eastlink: May 12, 2011	Also available on Bell TV

On November 19, 2003, CTV launched an HD simulcast of its Toronto station CFTO-DT, with the free-to-air feed launching in 2005. CTV has since launched HD simulcasts of CIVT-DT Vancouver on June 1, 2004 (the terrestrial feed followed suit in 2006), CFCN-DT Calgary on January 8, 2009, CFCF-DT Montreal on December 1, 2009 (the free-to-air feed followed suit on January 28, 2011), CJOH-DT Ottawa on December 1, 2009 (BDU only), CFRN-DT Edmonton in January 2011, CKY-DT Winnipeg in February 2011, and CJCH-DT Halifax on May 11, 2011.

=== Local newscasts in high definition ===
On May 12, 2009, Toronto's CFTO-DT became the first station in the CTV network to broadcast its local newscasts in high definition (the first station in Canada to broadcast its local newscasts in high definition was fellow Toronto station CITY-DT). CTV-owned CIVT-DT in Vancouver followed, becoming the second station in the CTV network to broadcast its local newscasts in high definition as of November 23, 2009. CFCN-DT in Calgary began broadcasting its local newscasts in HD in October 2011, while CFRN-DT in Edmonton upgraded its local news production to HD in October 2012.

== CTV stations ==
=== CTV owned-and-operated stations ===
As of mid-October 2005, all CTV-owned and operated stations have adopted a single on-air brand of "CTV", rather than use their official callsigns or channel numbers on-air (although some stations, most notably CIVT, promote their cable channel number). When further differentiation is needed, for example during regional programming, the city or region they serve (for example, "CTV Ottawa" or "CTV British Columbia") may be used as well. Under CRTC regulations, however, the callsign is still the station's legal name.

Note:

1) Italicized channel numbers indicate a digital channel allocated for future use by the Canadian Radio-television and Telecommunications Commission.

City of licence	Station	Channel TV (RF)	Year of affiliation	Owned since
Calgary, Alberta	CFCN-DT	4.1 (29)	1961	1998
Edmonton, Alberta	CFRN-DT	3.1 (12)	1961	1997
Halifax, Nova Scotia	CJCH-DT	5.1 (48)	1961	1997
Kitchener, Ontario	CKCO-DT	13.1 (13)	1964	1998
Lethbridge, Alberta	CFCN-DT	13.1 (13)	1968	1996
Moncton, New Brunswick	CKCW-DT	29.1 (29)	1969	1997
Montreal, Quebec	CFCF-DT	12.1 (12)	1961	2001
North Bay, Ontario	CKNY-DT	10.1 (12)	1971	1990
Ottawa, Ontario	CJOH-DT	13.1 (13)	1961	1998
Prince Albert, Saskatchewan	CIPA-DT	9	1987	1987
Red Deer, Alberta	CFRN-DT	3.1 (12)	1973	1997
Regina, Saskatchewan	CKCK-DT	2.1 (8)	1969	1997
Saint John, New Brunswick	CKLT-DT	9.1 (9)	1969	1997
Saskatoon, Saskatchewan	CFQC-DT	8.1 (8)	1971	1997
Sault Ste. Marie, Ontario	CHBX-TV	2 (analog only)	1977	1990
Sudbury, Ontario	CICI-TV	5 (analog only)	1971	1990
Sydney, Nova Scotia	CJCB-DT	4.1 (25)	1972	1997
Timmins, Ontario	CITO-TV	3 (analog only)	1971 (as rebroadcaster of CKSO/Sudbury)	1990
Toronto, Ontario	CFTO-DT	9.1 (8)	1961	1998
Vancouver, British Columbia	CIVT-DT	32.1 (32)	2001	1997
Winnipeg, Manitoba	CKY-DT	7.1 (7)	1961	2001
Yorkton, Saskatchewan	CICC-DT	10	1971	1986

=== Regional affiliates ===
As CTV does not presently operate as a de jure television network using a CRTC-issued network licence, these stations acquire CTV programming from Bell Media by way of program supply agreements, not network affiliation agreements. Although they currently carry the vast majority of CTV programs and generally use a similar schedule to CTV-owned stations, the stations retain all advertising inventory, and have final authority over carriage and scheduling of CTV programming.

City of licence/market	Station	Channel TV (RF)	Year of affiliation	Owner
Thunder Bay, Ontario	CKPR-DT	2.1 (2)	2014	Dougall Media

=== Former affiliates ===
City of licence	Station	Year of affiliation	Year of disaffiliation	Notes
Jamestown/Buffalo, New York, United States	WNYP-TV	1966	1969	Left the network after legal action from WKBW-TV, WGR-TV (now WGRZ-TV), and WBEN-TV (now WIVB-TV); channel now used for a TCT owned-and-operated station with the call sign WNYB (but a different licence from WNYP-TV).
Kenora, Ontario	CJBN-TV	1980	2011	Left the network after its affiliation agreement with Bell Media ended; subsequently owned by Shaw Communications as a Global affiliate; left the air on January 27, 2017.
Kingston, Ontario	CKWS-DT	2015	2018	Left the network after its affiliation agreement with Bell Media ended; currently owned by Corus Entertainment as a Global O&O.
Oshawa, Ontario	CHEX-TV-2	2015	2018	Left the network after its affiliation agreement with Bell Media ended; currently owned by Corus Entertainment as a Global O&O.
Pembroke/Ottawa, Ontario	CHRO-TV	1991	1997	Swapped by Baton for CHUM Limited's stations in Atlantic Canada; currently owned by Bell Media as a CTV 2 O&O.
Peterborough, Ontario	CHEX-DT	2015	2018	Left the network after its affiliation agreement with Bell Media ended; currently owned by Corus Entertainment as a Global O&O.
Thunder Bay, Ontario	CHFD-DT	1972	2010	Left the network after an affiliation dispute with CTVglobemedia, became an affiliate of Global; currently operated by Dougall Media as Global affiliate. As noted above, in 2014 Dougall Media readded a CTV affiliation on its other station in the market, CKPR-DT, after disaffiliating that station from CBC Television.
St. John's, Newfoundland and Labrador	CJON-DT	1964	2002 (primary)	Left the network after an affiliation dispute with Bell Globemedia, still airs news programming from CTV; currently operated by Stirling Communications International as an independent station.
Vancouver, British Columbia	CHAN-DT	1961 (secondary); 1965 (primary)	2001	Originally owned by Western International Communications, sold to Canwest Global and became a Global O&O; currently owned by Corus Entertainment as a Global O&O.
Victoria, British Columbia	CHEK-DT	1963 (secondary); 1981 (primary)	2001	Originally owned by Western International Communications, sold to Canwest Global and became a CH O&O; currently owned by CHEK Media Group as an independent station.
Lloydminster, Alberta/Saskatchewan	CITL-DT	1976	2025	Left the network when the station went off the air on May 13, 2025.

=== Special cases ===
- St. John's, Newfoundland and Labrador – CJON-DT (NTV): disaffiliated with CTV in 2002, but still carries CTV's newscasts and specials.

=== Other CTV-branded channels ===
CTV Two

In addition to CTV News Channel, several other spin-offs have been launched under the CTV branding. Former specialty channels that have used the CTV brand (and formerly had ownership stakes by the parent company) include CTV Sportsnet (now Sportsnet) and CTV Travel (now T+E).

Following the 2007 acquisition of A-Channel by CTVglobemedia as part of the takeover of CHUM Limited, media analysts had speculated that CTV may potentially extend its market-leading CTV brand to that television network. Bell officially announced on May 30, 2011, that the A-Channel television network would be rebranded as "CTV Two", a change that took effect on August 29, 2011. CTV Two currently consists of four over-the-air O&Os in Ontario and three in British Columbia, as well as regional cable-only channels in Atlantic Canada and Alberta, providing complementary programming which have smaller audiences than those on the mainline CTV network.

In June 2018, Bell Media announced plans to rename four of its existing specialty channels under the CTV branding. The original Bravo, The Comedy Network, Gusto, and Space were respectively relaunched as CTV Drama Channel, CTV Comedy Channel, CTV Life Channel, and CTV Sci-Fi Channel on September 12, 2019. In December 2018, Bell launched two ad-supported video on demand (AVOD) services, CTV Movies and CTV Throwback (originally announced as "CTV Vault"), respectively offering second-run feature films and classic TV series. Their programming would primarily be drawn from an agreement with Sony Pictures Television; Sony's video service Crackle would exit Canada on June 28, 2018, with its content being assumed by the two services.

It was also announced that content from CTV, its four genre channels, as well as CTV Movies and CTV Throwback, would be eventually accessible within a unified "super-hub" for streaming video platforms. The new CTV app was released in July 2020, subsuming the TV Everywhere apps for the aforementioned channels. It would also subsume the streaming apps for most other Bell Media networks. In 2024, Bell launched a suite of free ad-supported streaming television (FAST) channels via providers such as Samsung TV Plus, including CTV@Home (lifestyle programming), CTV Gridlock (Highway Thru Hell and Heavy Rescue: 401), and CTV Laughs (comedy) among others.

In October 2024, due to the end of Bell Media's licensing agreement with Warner Bros. Discovery for its factual networks, it was announced that Animal Planet, Discovery Science, and Discovery Velocity would be relaunched as CTV Wild Channel, CTV Nature Channel, and CTV Speed Channel respectively on January 1, 2025.

In late November 2025, content from CTV and other Bell Media entertainment TV channels was added to the Crave streaming service as a free ad-supported tier, with linear TV channels available via a Crave subscription and/or TV provider authentication. On May 1, 2026, the CTV website and apps were decommissioned, with users redirected to Crave. The CTV News website and apps continue to operate separately.

== Logos ==
The network's original logo was an oval-shaped letter "C", the inside shaped like a television tube. Contained within the C were the initials "CTV". In 1966, colour programming was ushered in with a new logo, depicting a red circle containing the initial "C", a blue square with a "T", and a green inverted triangle with a "V". This logo has been used to the present day, albeit with minor variation.

In 1967, the letters "CTV" were redesigned and made thicker, making them easier to see. The letters in turn became rounded, with the "base/TV" graphic added later. In 1975, the shapes were brightened. In 1990, the letters "CTV" were angled and tweaked with any additional designs dropped from it. In 1998, CTV introduced a new "ribbons" identity which lasted until 2018 with various minor adjustments before then.

Initially, CTV used the three coloured ribbons and shapes of its logo to represent its different divisions. In the network branding, the red ribbon and circle represented entertainment programming, the blue ribbon and square represented news programming, and the green ribbon and inverted triangle referred to sports programming. For a period, the identity featured bumper idents featuring CTV personalities manipulating the logo's shapes as physical objects. Later, in 1998, the network added colour gradients to the shapes to create a 3D effect. That variant became CTV's official logo in 2004; the 3D shapes then obtained a more realistic appearance on August 29, 2011 to reflect the name change from A to CTV Two.

On September 24, 2018, CTV introduced a new logo and branding elements with a flatter "digital" appearance, as well as a new promotional campaign, "Get into it".

CTV's original logo (1961–1966)

Original version of CTV's geometrical shape logo (1966–1967)

The logo in use during the late 1960s and early 1970s added the colors, still in use today, to the shapes, with the letters being rounded (1968–1975)

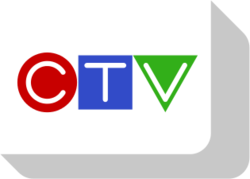
The logo in use during the late 1970s and early 1980s added a white half-square representing a television picture tube to the geometrical shape logo (1975–1985)

The logo in use during the late 1980s added three diagonal stripes to the geometrical shape logo (1985–1990)

The logo in use from 1990 to 2018 dropped any additional designs to the geometrical shape logo with letters being angled and tweaked. In 1998, the network added colour gradients to the shapes to create a 3D effect before that variant became the network's official logo in 2004, although the plain version remained in use in print publications where the colour gradients could not be rendered.

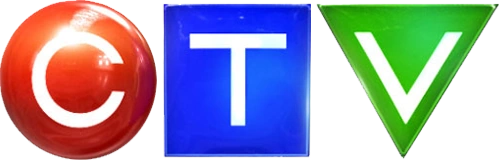
The logo in use during the 2010s, which was made to reflect the name change from sister system A to CTV Two, gave the shapes a more realistic effect, making the shapes brighter (2011–2018)

The 2018 logo switched exclusively to a flat version, with brighter colours and refined letter shapes. (2018–present)

== See also ==
- List of CTV personalities
- Television in Canada
- Media in Canada
- Simultaneous substitution
