= Peppiatt and Aylesworth =

Canadian comedy team

Peppiatt and Aylesworth were a Canadian television comedy team. The team consisted of Frank Peppiatt (March 19, 1927 – November 7, 2012) and John Aylesworth (August 18, 1928 – July 28, 2010).

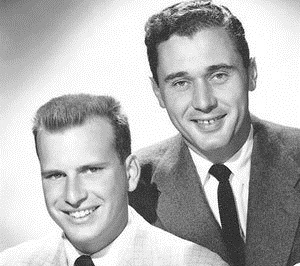
The comedy team of Peppiatt & Aylesworth

John Aylesworth was born on August 18, 1928, in Toronto, Ontario, Canada, and performed on radio as a child. He left high school before graduating and went into the advertising business as a writer, working together with Frank Peppiatt.

Frank Peppiatt was born to Frank and Sarah Peppiatt in Toronto, Ontario, on March 19, 1927. He attended the University of Toronto, where he earned a bachelor's degree in 1949. He took a job with his Toronto classmate, Norman Jewison, after college working on college stage productions.

== Early career at CBC ==
Though best known for creating the TV show Hee Haw (1969–1995), the comedy team of Peppiatt & Aylesworth started out as performers. They wrote and starred in three shows for the CBC between 1952 and 1957.

They "were total cutups at the ad agency" where they worked and were approached by the Canadian Broadcasting Corporation based on their reputation to write sketches.

They were on the radio before their more famous counterparts Wayne and Shuster decided to leave their radio show. Aylesworth had done some radio as a teenager and Peppiatt had done some theatre before landing the first-ever comedy series on Canadian television, After Hours on the CBC in 1952. That program also gave Bernard Slade his start in television. Aylesworth also created Front Page Challenge, a current events and history game show that ran on CBC Television from 1957 to 1995.

They later went on to write and star in two more Canadian TV series On Stage and The Big Revue. Several of these programs were produced by future Oscar winner Norman Jewison and directed by Norman Campbell.

This period is considered the golden age for Canadian television with actors William Shatner, Christopher Plummer, Lorne Greene, Leslie Nielsen, Robert Goulet, gameshow host Monty Hall, and directors like Arthur Hiller and Norman Jewison all getting their start with the Canadian Broadcasting Corporation.

== Move to the United States ==
Aylesworth and Peppiatt relocated to the United States in 1958 and got work writing for The Andy Williams Show, concentrating on writing and producing, rather than performing.

They went on to write, create or produce numerous programs, such as: The Judy Garland Show, The Jonathan Winters Show, The Jimmy Dean Show, Hullabaloo, The ABC Comedy Hour, the Steve Allen Show, The Sonny & Cher Show, Perry Como's Kraft Music Hall, The Julie Andrews Hour, The Harlem Globetrotters Popcorn Machine, and specials for Andy Williams, Frank Sinatra, Jackie Gleason, Don Knotts, John Wayne, Shields and Yarnell, Jimmy Durante, Bing Crosby, and others.

Peppiatt and Aylesworth also appeared on many comedy albums throughout the 1960s, often serving as guest writers and performers. They also wrote "The Ballad of Irving" for a novelty album by Frank Gallop which became one of the all-time hits on the Dr. Demento radio show.

The team also wrote Rich Little's original Canadian nightclub act and continued to write for him throughout the 1960s. Peppiatt had worked on the CBC's Jackie Rae Show on which Little appeared on the show at the age of 17. They helped the impressionist break into the United States by helping arrange for him to appear on two shows they wrote for, The Judy Garland Show and The Jimmy Dean Show, leading to appearances on numerous other television appearances.

== Hee Haw ==
Having worked together on The Jimmy Dean Show, Peppiatt and Aylesworth wondered why a show hosted by a country music star didn't feature the country music more prominently. Aylesworth's 2010 book The Corn Was Green: The Inside Story of Hee Haw published by McFarland & Company told how he and Peppiatt came up with the idea for Hee Haw after seeing "country banter" between Charley Weaver and Jonathan Winters on The Jonathan Winters Show, and seeing that the shows atop the Nielsen ratings included The Andy Griffith Show, The Beverly Hillbillies, Gomer Pyle, U.S.M.C., Green Acres and Petticoat Junction, along with Rowan & Martin's Laugh-In and the duo conceived immediately of the format of country variety resulting in one of the longest-running series in television history, Hee Haw. Originally a summer replacement for The Smothers Brothers Comedy Hour, Hee Haw was an immediate ratings winner throughout that first summer and was permanently added to the CBS schedule in December 1969. Co-hosted by Roy Clark and Buck Owens, the hour-long program featured regulars Archie Campbell, Grandpa Jones, Minnie Pearl, Junior Samples, Lulu Roman and Canadians Gordie Tapp and Don Harron. Comedian and frequent Peppiatt & Aylesworth collaborator Jack Burns was also a writer and major contributor in the early years of the show. There was also a spinoff sitcom "Hee Haw Honeys". One of the stars of the series was a young Christian music singer, Kathie Lee Johnson (Gifford) before she married Frank Gifford.

Ron Simon, curator of television and radio at New York's Paley Center for Media, described their collaboration at Hee Haw as "an interesting hybrid of two of the most popular programs of the '60s, The Beverly Hillbillies and Rowan & Martin's Laugh-In, and ironically outlasted both of them. The show featured a sequence of brief sketches of cornball humour, combined with performances by top acts in bluegrass, country and western and gospel music. The show lasted for two seasons, starting in 1969 on CBS in prime time and lasted on network television until 1971 when CBS axed all of its country-oriented programming. The show then ran in syndication for another 22 years, making it one of the longest-running programs in television history with 585 episodes. Simon noted that Hee Haw featured performances by Merle Haggard, Johnny Cash and Conway Twitty preserved in their prime".

== Later career 1980s to 2000s ==
After they sold Hee Haw to the owners of the Grand Ole Opry for 15 million dollars in the mid-1980s, Peppiatt & Aylesworth worked on various solo projects. They wanted to leave while the show was still on top, and they were, consistently placing number one or two, regularly beating The Lawrence Welk Show (by this point Welk had retired) and Soul Train among syndicated programs in prime-time. John Aylesworth created and produced The Nashville Palace and was later recruited for Dolly in 1987. He began writing several plays and musical productions for Palm Springs-area theatre after moving there. Frank Peppiatt worked on The Barbara Mandrell Show (1980–1982), then went on to produce a series starring Don Adams called Check it Out! in Canada. The two came together in the late 1980s to write a musical based on the life of Jimmy Durante. The play ran on stages in Toronto, San Francisco, and Los Angeles.

In 1996, they reunited for a tribute show in Canada honouring their long careers and great contributions to television and film. The program, Adrienne Clarkson Presents- A Tribute to Peppiatt & Aylesworth: Canada's First Television Comedy Team aired in October 1996 on the CBC and was rerun several times through 1997. The show was produced by John Aylesworth's son, Bill Aylesworth and directed by Robin Campbell (Norman Campbell's son). It profiled their classic careers with interviews, clips, archive footage, Kinescopes, and new sketches shot just for the tribute. Rich Little, Bernard Slade, Jill Foster, Norman Jewison, Norman Campbell, and others contributed their remembrances. The duo was once again called back to Canada in 2005 for the production of Comedy Gold, a history of Canadian comedy featuring an All-Star cast including; Dan Aykroyd, Martin Short, Tommy Chong, Lorne Michaels, Howie Mandel, Ivan Reitman, Jim Carrey and others. They also participated in a retrospective, The Joke's on Us: 50 Years of CBC Satire, in 2002.

Peppiatt & Aylesworth were inducted into the CBC Comedy Hall Of Fame in 1995.

They duo were inducted as a team into the Canadian Comedy Hall of Fame (part of the Canadian Comedy Awards) in November/2022 in Toronto, ON (Canada), during a 3-Day comedy festival produced by Tim Progosh. In attendance to accept the awards were Frank Peppiatt's daughters Francesca Robyn Peppiatt and Marney Peppiatt, and grandchildren. Bill Aylesworth accepted for his father on behalf of the Aylesworth Family.

== Personal life ==
Aylesworth was a resident of Palm Desert, California. He died at age 81 on July 28, 2010, at Eisenhower Medical Center in Rancho Mirage, California, due to complications of pneumonia as a complication of pulmonary fibrosis. He was survived by his fourth wife, Anita Rufus, as well as by a daughter Linda Aylesworth (a retired reporter for Global BC in Canada) and a son Robert from his first marriage, a daughter Cynthia Heatley, and two sons John and Bill Aylesworth from the marriage to his second wife, Nancy Atchison-Aylesworth, along with one grandson Robert. Another son, Thomas Aylesworth, died in 2003 from melanoma. His book The Corn was Green: The Inside Story of Hee Haw (McFarland & Company) was published in March 2010, three months before his death.

Peppiatt died from bladder cancer in Ponte Vedra Beach, Florida, on November 7, 2012, at the age of 85. He was survived by his third wife, Caroline Peppiatt; from his marriage to Marilyn Peppiatt, two daughters, Francesca Robyn and Marney Peppiatt, youngest daughter, Melissa Peppiatt MacIssac died in 2000; and four grandchildren. His autobiography, When Variety Was King: Memoir of a TV Pioneer, was published posthumously by ECW Press in April 2013.
