= List of The Jimmy Dean Show episodes =

The Jimmy Dean Show is an hour-long weekly music and variety television show carried by ABC for three seasons from September 19, 1963 to April 1, 1966 out of ABC Studio One in New York. Its first season was written by Peppiatt and Aylesworth, and the show starred Jimmy Dean.

== Series overview ==
Season	Episodes	Originally released	
Season	Episodes	First released	Last released
1	30	September 19, 1963	April 23, 1964
2	30	September 17, 1964	May 13, 1965
3	26	September 17, 1965	April 1, 1966

== Season 1 (1963–64) ==
No. overall	No. in season	Title	Original release date
1	101	September 19, 1963	
Guest stars are Dick Shawn, Fred Flintstone, The Jubilee Four, and Chuck McCann.
2	102	September 26, 1963	
Rosemary Clooney, Al Hirt, Roy Clark.
3	103	October 3, 1963	
Roy Clark, Milt Kamen, Karen Morrow.
4	104	October 10, 1963	
McGuire Sisters, Jack E. Leonard, Ron Martin, Stuart Hamblen, Pat McCormick.
5	105	October 17, 1963	
Art Carney, Patrice Munsel, Dukes of Dixieland, Ron Martin.
6	106	October 24, 1963	
Jane Morgan, Phil Ford & Mimi Hines, The Jubilee Four, Ron Martin.
7	107	October 31, 1963	
Teresa Brewer, The Wills Sisters, Jackie Mason, The Jubilee Four, Ron Martin.
8	108	November 7, 1963	
Jo Stafford, Don Adams, The Jubilee Four, Elston Howard, TN Gov. Frank Clement, Ron Martin, Pat McCormick.
9	109	November 14, 1963	
Red Buttons, Jerry Vale, Molly Bee, The Crum Brothers, Ron Martin.
10	110	November 21, 1963	
Maureen O'Hara, Bronwyn FitzSimons, Professor Backwards (Jimmy Edmundson).
11	111	November 28, 1963	
McGuire Sisters, The Jubilee Four, Don Adams, The Crum Brothers.
12	112	December 5, 1963	
Eddy Arnold, Molly Bee, Allan Sherman, Lud & Lester.
13	113	December 12, 1963	
Jack Carter, Homer and Jethro, Molly Bee.
14	114	December 19, 1963	
George Gobel, Anna Moffo, Buck Owens, The Jubilee Four, Lud & Lester.
15	115	December 26, 1963	
Patty Duke, Tex Ritter, The Jubilee Four, Jackie Mason, Lassie.
16	116	January 9, 1964	
Chet Atkins, Molly Bee, Homer and Jethro, Don Adams.
17	117	January 16, 1964	
Jane Morgan, Johnny Tillotson, George Kirby, Duke of Paducah, Buck Owens, Smitty & The Virginians.
18	118	January 23, 1964	
Johnny Cash, Molly Bee, Boots Randolph, Phil Ford & Mimi Hines, Grandpa Jones, Eddie Arnold (cameo).
19	119	January 30, 1964	
Patti Page, Ferlin Husky, Grandpa Jones, Wade Ray, Norm Crosby.
20	120	February 13, 1964	
Eydie Gorme, George Jones, Don Adams.
21	121	February 20, 1964	
Julius LaRosa, Skeeter Davis, George Kirby, Lassie, Toots Thielemans.
22	122	February 27, 1964	
Eddy Arnold, Corbett Monica, Molly Bee, Buck Owens, Smitty & The Virginians.
23	123	March 5, 1964	
Dorothy Collins, Boots Randolph, Hank Williams Jr., Charlie Manna.
24	124	March 12, 1964	
Buck Owens, Molly Bee, Don Adams, Pat McCormick.
25	125	March 19, 1964	
Johnny Tillotson, Molly Bee, Homer and Jethro, The Four Cuties from Hackensack, Norm Crosby.
26	126	March 26, 1964	
Jack Jones, Hank Snow, Professor Backwards, Toots Thielemans, Four Cuties from Hackensack.
27	127	April 2, 1964	
Eydie Gorme, Jim Reeves, Don Adams, Pat McCormick, Buck Owens, Smitty & The Virginians.
28	128	April 9, 1964	
Hank Thompson, Molly Bee, Roy Clark, Eagle and Man.
29	129	April 16, 1964	
Vikki Carr, Carl Smith, Milt Kamen.
30	130	April 23, 1964	
Buck Owens, Molly Bee, Don Adams, Pat McCormick, Toots Thielemans.

== Season 2 (1964-65) ==
No. overall	No. in season	Title	Original release date
31	201	September 17, 1964	
Guest stars are Roger Miller, Don Adams, Molly Bee.
32	202	September 17, 1964	
Roger Miller, Don Adams, Molly Bee.
33	203	October 1, 1964	
Vikki Carr, Roy Drusky, Pete Drake, Al Kelly.
34	204	October 8, 1964	
Bobby Vinton, Homer and Jethro, Molly Bee, Toots Thielemans.
35	205	October 15, 1964	
Ernest Tubb, Roy Clark, Don Adams, Molly Bee.
36	206	October 22, 1964	
Sheb Wooley, Connie Smith, The Stoneman Family, Professor Irwin Corey.
37	207	October 29, 1964	
Johnny Tillotson, Don Adams, Grandpa Jones, Molly Bee.
38	208	November 5, 1964	
Eddy Arnold, Minnie Pearl, Dottie West, Chet Atkins, Ernest Tubb, Flatt and Scruggs, and The Jordanaires. Broadcast from the Ryman Auditorium in Nashville, TN.
39	209	November 19, 1964	
Jerry Vale, Carmel Quinn, The Virginians.
40	210	November 26, 1964	
Johnny Cash, Floyd Cramer, Molly Bee, Norm Crosby.
41	211	December 3, 1964	
Eileen Farrell, Charlie Rich, Faron Young.
42	212	December 10, 1964	
Teresa Brewer, Ferlin Husky.
43	213	December 17, 1964	
Molly Bee, Boots Randolph, George Kirby.
44	214	December 24, 1964	
Porter Wagoner, Jerry Vale, The Quinto Sisters, Garry Dean, Connie Dean, and Robert Dean.
45	215	December 31, 1964	
Porter Wagoner, Jerry Vale, The Quinto Sisters, Garry Dean, Connie Dean, and Robert Dean.
46	216	January 7, 1965	
Bobby Rydell, Roger Miller, Minnie Pearl, The Levee Singers.
47	217	January 14, 1965	
Jane Morgan, Eddy Arnold, Roy Clark, Abe Weatherwise.
48	218	January 21, 1965	
Buck Owens, The Mills Brothers, Norm Crosby.
49	219	January 28, 1965	
Jack Jones, Rex Allen, Toots Thielemans, Nudie Cohn.
50	220	February 11, 1965	
Bill Cosby, Bandleader Leon McAuliffe, Molly Bee.
51	221	February 18, 1965	
Vikki Carr, Henny Youngman, Johnny Tillotson.
52	222	February 25, 1965	
Carl Smith, Phil Ford & Mimi Hines, Della Rae.
53	223	March 4, 1965	
Louise O'Brien, Sonny James, The Village Stompers.
54	224	March 11, 1965	
Jerry Vale, Judy Lynn, Homer and Jethro.
55	225	March 25, 1965	
Eddy Arnold, Kay Starr, Norm Crosby, The Village Stompers, Florida Citrus Queen. Broadcast from Winter Haven, FL.
56	226	April 8, 1965	
Chet Atkins, Julie Rogers, Cliff Arquette (as Charley Weaver), Floyd Cramer.
57	227	April 15, 1965	
Gene Pitney, George Jones, Molly Bee, Leo Durocher.
58	228	April 22, 1965	
June Valli, Porter Wagoner, Adam Keefe, Rich Richelieu.
59	229	May 6, 1965	
Boots Randolph, Elton Britt.
60	230	May 13, 1965	
Roy Clark, Rex Allen, Judy Lynn.

== Season 3 (1965-66) ==
No. overall	No. in season	Title	Original release date
61	301	September 17, 1965	
Guest stars are Eddy Arnold, Gene Pitney, Buck Owens, Connie Smith, Linda Gayle. Broadcast from the Ryman Auditorium in Nashville, TN.
62	302	September 24, 1965	
Ernest Tubb, John Davidson, Corbett Monica, Jody Miller.
63	303	October 1, 1965	
Jane Morgan, Will Jordan, Bill Anderson, The Geezinslaw Brothers.
64	304	October 8, 1965	
Bobby Vinton, Jody Miller, Don Gibson, The Geezinslaw Brothers.
65	305	October 15, 1965	
Cliff Arquette, Johnny Tillotson, Molly Bee, Buck & Smitty and The Virginians, Toots Thielemans.
66	306	October 22, 1965	
Roy Acuff, Buck Owens, Minnie Pearl, Roy Drusky, Del Reeves, Norma Jean, Merle Haggard, Tex Ritter, Connie Smith, Jim Reeves, Hank Cochran, Wesley Rose, Roger Miller, Frances Preston, TN Gov. Frank G. Clement. Broadcast from the Ryman Auditorium in Nashville, TN.
67	307	November 5, 1965	
Arthur Godfrey, Sharon Carnes, Fran Allison, Bobby Bare, The Geezinslaw Brothers.
68	308	November 12, 1965	
John Davidson, Del Reeves, Eddie Peabody, Molly Bee.
69	309	November 19, 1965	
Forrest Tucker, Jody Miller, Homer and Jethro.
70	310	November 26, 1965	
George Jones, Cliff Arquette, Jimmy Dickens, Gale Garnett, The Bordermen feat. Chuck Woolery. Broadcast from Miami Beach, FL.
71	311	December 3, 1965	
Eileen Farrell, Chet Atkins, Don Gibson, Boots Randolph, Floyd Cramer, Buck & Smitty, Norm Crosby. Broadcast from Carnegie Hall.
72	312	December 10, 1965	
Joanie Sommers, Jerry Vale, Leroy Van Dyke, Cliff Arquette, Joe Maphis, Milton Berle. Broadcast from ABC Studios in Hollywood, CA.
73	313	December 17, 1965	
Kay Starr, Joe Maphis, Bobby Rydell, Cliff Arquette, Phil Harris, Lassie. Broadcast from ABC Studios in Hollywood, CA.
74	314	December 24, 1965	
Rich Little, Jody Miller, Cliff Arquette, Joe Maphis, Chuck Green. Broadcast from ABC Studios in Hollywood, CA.
75	315	December 31, 1965	
Vikki Carr, Buck Owens, Norm Crosby, Joe Maphis, The Western Continentals.
76	316	January 14, 1966	
Roy Acuff, Flatt and Scruggs, George Hamilton IV, Sonny James, Carl Smith, Hank Snow, Kitty Wells, Dottie West, Faron Young. Broadcast from the Ryman Auditorium in Nashville, TN.
77	317	January 21, 1966	
Pearl Bailey, Cliff Arquette, Buck Owens, Wilma Bridges.
78	318	January 28, 1966	
The Everly Brothers, Jody Miller, Fran Allison, Lloyd Green.
79	319	February 11, 1966	
The Andrews Sisters, Billy Grammer, Sgt. Barry Sadler.
80	320	February 18, 1966	
Molly Bee, Roy Clark, Jerry Caterino, The Japanese Grand Ole Opry.
81	321	February 25, 1966	
George Carlin, The Brown Family, Peggy Paxton, Warner Mark, Elton Britt.
82	322	March 4, 1966	
Al Martino, Don Gibson, Sharon Carnes, The Statesmen Quartet.
83	323	March 11, 1966	
Roberta Sherwood, Boots Randolph, Norm Crosby, Marvin Laird.
84	324	March 18, 1966	
Maury Wills, Jim Mudcat Grant, Margie Bowes, Loraine Lee, George Carlin.
85	325	March 25, 1966	
Jerry Vale, Norm Crosby, George Jones, Billy Grammer.
86	326	April 1, 1966	
No special guests. For the last show, Jimmy Dean, Jim Henson's Rowlf the Dog, and The Chuck Cassidy Singers filled the show.
