= On Stage (TV program) =

Canadian music variety show

- Genre: Variety
- Written by: John Aylesworth; Frank Peppiatt
- Presented by: George Murray; Denny Vaughan; Joan Fairfax
- Country of origin: Canada
- Original language: English
- No. of seasons: 2

Production
- Producer: Norman Jewison
- Running time: 30 minutes

Original release
- Network: CBC Television
- Release: 6 October 1954 – 24 October 1955

On Stage is a Canadian music variety show that aired on CBC Television from 1954 to 1955.

== Premise ==
George Murray hosted this variety show for most of its run, with mid-1955 episodes hosted by Denny Vaughan and Joan Fairfax. Series regulars included Jack Kane's orchestra, the Bill Brady Quartet, with singers Terry Dale, Phyllis Marshall and Wally Koster. John Aylesworth and Frank Peppiatt, later of Hee Haw, were the scriptwriters, developing comedy segments which featured Alfie Scopp, Reuben Ship, Al Bertram, and Jill Foster. Lever Brothers was the program sponsor.

== Scheduling ==
This half-hour program was broadcast for a full season on Wednesdays at 9:30 p.m. (Eastern) from 6 October 1954 to 1 June 1955, then in the same day and time slot from 6 July to 21 September 1955. After an episode on 19 September 1955, it was broadcast for a short run in the next season, Mondays at 8:30 p.m. from 26 September to 24 October 1955 then replaced in that time slot with The Denny Vaughan Show.

== See also ==
- The Big Revue
