= John Aylesworth =

Canadian television writer and actor (1928–2010)

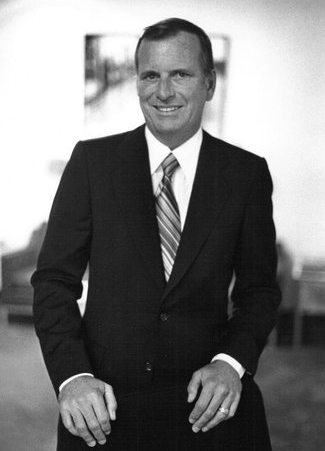
- Aylesworth in 1977
- Born: John Bansley Aylesworth; August 18, 1928; Toronto, Ontario, Canada
- Died: July 28, 2010 (aged 81); Rancho Mirage, California, U.S.
- Occupations: Television writer; producer; comedian; author; playwright; actor
- Spouse: Anita Rufus
- Children: Linda, Robert, John, Cynthia, Bill, and Thomas Aylesworth
- Relatives: Fredrick and Marie Aylesworth
- Writing career
- Notable work: Hee Haw

John Bansley Aylesworth (August 18, 1928 – July 28, 2010) was a Canadian television writer, producer, comedian, and actor, best known as co-creator of the American country music television variety show Hee Haw, which appeared on network television for two years and then ran for decades in first-run syndication.

== Early life ==
The son of Fredrick and Marie Aylesworth, John Bansley Aylesworth was born on August 18, 1928, in Toronto, Ontario, Canada, and performed on radio as a child.

== Career ==
He left high school before graduating and went into the advertising business, joining MacLaren Advertising as a writer, where he worked together with Frank Peppiatt. His wife recalled that they "were total cutups at the agency" and were approached by the Canadian Broadcasting Corporation based on their reputation to write sketches for the late night variety program After Hours. At this point they officially became the comedy team of Peppiatt and Aylesworth. Peppiatt & Aylesworth were Canada's first television comedy team. They also wrote and performed on the CBC programs The Big Revue and On Stage and Aylesworth created Front Page Challenge, a current events and history game show that ran on CBC Television from 1957 to 1995.

=== Hee Haw ===
Aylesworth and Peppiatt relocated to the United States in 1958 and got work writing for The Andy Williams Show. They had worked together on The Jimmy Dean Show and wondered why a show hosted by a country music star didn't feature the country music more prominently. Aylesworth's 2010 book The Corn Was Green: The Inside Story of Hee Haw published by McFarland & Company told how he and Peppiatt came up with the idea for Hee Haw after seeing "country banter" between Charley Weaver and Jonathan Winters on The Jonathan Winters Show, and seeing that the shows atop the Nielson ratings included The Andy Griffith Show, The Beverly Hillbillies, Gomer Pyle, U.S.M.C., Green Acres and Petticoat Junction, along with Rowan & Martin's Laugh-In and the duo conceived immediately of the format of country variety. Originally a summer replacement for The Smothers Brothers Comedy Hour, Hee Haw was an immediate ratings winner throughout that first summer and was permanently added to the CBS schedule in December 1969. Co-hosted by Roy Clark and Buck Owens, the hour-long program featured regulars Archie Campbell, Grandpa Jones, Minnie Pearl, Junior Samples, Lulu Roman and Gordie Tapp.

Ron Simon curator of television and radio at New York's Paley Center for Media described their collaboration at Hee Haw as "an interesting hybrid of two of the most popular programs of the '60s, The Beverly Hillbillies and Rowan & Martin's Laugh-In, and ironically outlasted both of them". The show featured a sequence of brief sketches of cornball humor, combined with performances by top acts in bluegrass, country and western and gospel music. The show lasted for two seasons, starting in 1969 on CBS in prime time and lasted on network television until 1971 when CBS axed nearly all of its rural-oriented programming. The show then ran in syndication for another 22 years, making it one of the longest-running programs in television history with 585 episodes. Simon noted that Hee Haw featured performances by "Merle Haggard, Johnny Cash and Conway Twitty preserved in their prime". They sold the show in 1982 for $15 million.

=== Later career ===
Aylesworth and Peppiatt also wrote for other television programs, including The Jonathan Winters Show, The Judy Garland Show, Kraft Music Hall and Your Hit Parade, receiving Emmy Award nominations for The Julie Andrews Hour in 1973 and in 1976 for The Sonny and Cher Show. They served as producers on several of those programs as well.

Aylesworth worked with Peppiatt on a stage musical DURANTE, based on the life of Jimmy Durante which played in several cities including San Francisco, Los Angeles, and Toronto. In his later career he repeatedly tried to find work as a television writer, but couldn't find any. He gave up looking in the 1980s and filed a class action lawsuit against agents and the television studios claiming age discrimination.

In 1996 Peppiatt and Aylesworth reunited for a tribute show in Canada honouring their long careers and great contributions to television and film. The program, "Adrienne Clarkson Presents- A Tribute to Peppiatt & Aylesworth: Canada's First Television Comedy Team" aired in October 1996 on the CBC and was rerun several times through 1997. It profiled their classic careers with interviews, clips, archive footage, Kinescopes, and new sketches shot just for the tribute. The duo was once again called back to Canada in 2005 for the production of Comedy Gold, a history of Canadian comedy featuring an All-Star cast. They also participated in a retrospective, The Joke's on Us: 50 Years of CBC Satire, in 2002.

In 1995 Peppiatt & Aylesworth were inducted into the CBC Comedy Hall of Fame at the Canadian Broadcasting Corporation.

In 2022 the duo were inducted into the Canadian Comedy Hall of Fame on 11/16/22 in Toronto, ON (Canada), during a 3-Day comedy festival produced by Tim Progosh. In attendance to accept the awards were Frank Peppiatt's daughters Francesca Robyn Peppiatt and Marney Peppiatt, his third wife Caroline, as well as his four grandchildren. Bill Aylesworth accepted for his father on behalf of the Aylesworth family, including Linda, Bob, John, Cynthia, Thomas, Robert, and Anita.

== Later life and death ==
Aylesworth was a resident of Palm Desert, California. He died at age 81 on July 28, 2010, at Eisenhower Medical Center in Rancho Mirage, California, due to complications of pneumonia as a complication of pulmonary fibrosis.

He was survived by his fourth wife, Anita Rufus, as well as by a daughter Linda and son Robert from his first marriage and a daughter Cynthia and two sons John and Bill Aylesworth from his second wife Nancy Lee Eberle, along with one grandson Robert Karow. Another son Thomas died in 2003.

His longtime friend and partner, Frank Peppiatt, died on November 7, 2012, at the age of 85.
