= Junior Samples =

American comedian (1926–1983)

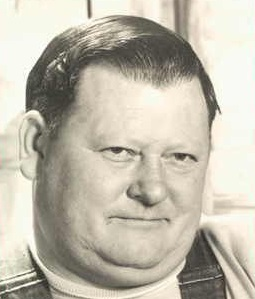
- Samples in 1970

Background information
- Born: Alvin Samples, Jr. August 10, 1926; Cumming, Georgia, US
- Died: November 13, 1983 (aged 57) Cumming, Georgia, US
- Genres: Comedy
- Occupations: Comedian; actor
- Instrument: Harmonica

Alvin Monroe Samples Jr. (August 10, 1926 – November 13, 1983), better known as Junior Samples, was an American comedian best known for his 14-year run as a cast member of the television show Hee Haw.

== Early years ==
A sixth-grade dropout, Samples was a stock car racing driver and carpenter by trade who went on the radio at the age of 40 and told a story about catching the largest fish ever seen in his hometown. The story was a humorous tall tale, and the recording of this radio story became a best-selling novelty record, "World's Biggest Whopper".

== Hee Haw ==
He was asked to become part of the 1969 cast of Hee Haw and created a bumbling personality, often stumbling or slow-talking his way through delivery, messing up jokes, and forgetting lines. One sketch of the show he appeared in regularly was "The Culhanes of Cornfield County" in which Junior, Gordie Tapp, Grandpa Jones and Lulu Roman would sit on a sofa and engage in a comedic deadpan routine: For example, in one episode each would talk about the new color TV set that had just been bought, but that they could not watch it, because they forgot they had no electricity in the house.

His five children also appeared in episodes during the early years of the show, playing the children in the "Schoolhouse" sketches and themselves in quickies.

=== BR-549 ===
Samples' most famous bit was as a used car salesman, inviting callers to call an older five-digit phone number, BR-549, which in the show's later years was changed to BR-1Z1Z. In 1993, BR5-49 was also taken as a name by an American country music band as an homage to the skit. The BR stands for Brenda Reece. She was friends with several actors on Hee Haw and when they were trying to come up with the skit. They had 549, but didn't know what to put with it so Reece suggested her initials, BR.

== Politics ==
In 1974, Samples announced that he was "seriously considering" running for lieutenant governor of Georgia on a Republican Party ticket with then-Macon mayor Ronnie Thompson, who was seeking the party's gubernatorial nomination. The media at first presented Samples' announcement as a political story. However, Samples was pulling a practical joke for publicity purposes. Thompson remained in the race and was defeated in the general election by the Democrat George D. Busbee.

== Personal life and death ==
Samples was married to Grace Carrie Bolton (April 27, 1927 – July 9, 2015), and they had five children together. Grace occasionally used Bolden as her maiden name and it was an official alias in legal documents. Junior, whose weight periodically neared 400 pounds (180 kg), was on Hee Haw for fourteen years, until he died of a heart attack in 1983 at the age of 57. His funeral was officiated by close friend Rev. Douglas Collins.

== Discography ==
Throughout the years Samples recorded several comedy albums. Although he was best known for his television appearances on Hee Haw, his recordings were often heard on radio. His first break came in 1966 with the recording of "The Whopper". He was nominated for two Comedian of the Year Awards from the Country Music Awards in 1969 and 1970, and made a number of other comedy albums.

- The World of Junior Samples (1967)
- Bull Session at Bull's Gap (1968)
- That's a Hee Haw (1970)
- Junior Samples and Archie Campbell (1977)
