= Hullabaloo (TV series) =

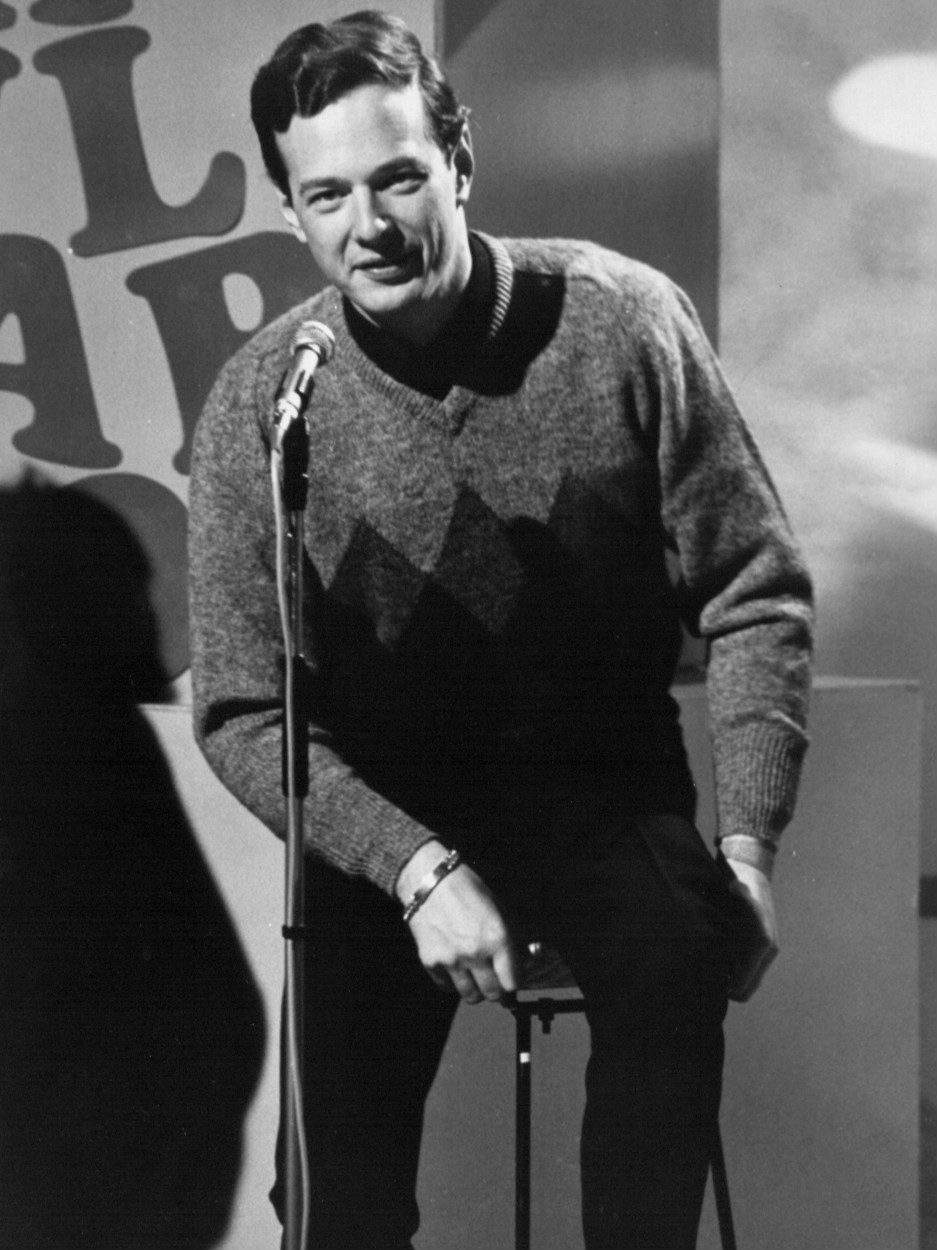
- Early episodes of Hullabaloo featured special segments taped in London and hosted by the Beatles' manager Brian Epstein who introduced up and coming British music acts.
- Genre: Musical variety
- Written by: John Aylesworth; Frank Peppiatt
- Directed by: Steve Binder; Bill Davis
- Narrated by: Johnny Holliday
- Country of origin: United States
- Original language: English
- No. of seasons: 2
- No. of episodes: 48

Production
- Executive producer: Gary Smith
- Running time: 45–48 minutes (January 1965–August 1965); 22–24 minutes (September 1965–April 1966)
- Production companies: The Gary Smith Company; Hullabaloo Enterprises

Original release
- Network: NBC
- Release: January 12, 1965 – August 29, 1966

Hullabaloo is an American musical variety series that aired on NBC from January 12, 1965, to April 11, 1966 (with repeats to August 1966). Similar to ABC's Shindig! and in contrast to American Bandstand, it aired in prime time.

== Overview ==
Directed by Steve Binder, who went on to direct Elvis Presley's 1968 "comeback" special, Hullabaloo served as a big-budget, quality showcase for the leading pop acts of the day, and was also competition for another like-minded television showcase, ABC's Shindig! A different host presided each week—among these were Sammy Davis Jr., Jerry Lewis, Gary Lewis, Petula Clark, Paul Anka, Liza Minnelli, Jack Jones, David McCallum and Frankie Avalon—singing a couple of his or her own hits and introducing the different acts. Chart-topping acts who performed on the show included Simon and Garfunkel, the Mamas & the Papas, Dionne Warwick, Gary Lewis and the Playboys, the Lovin' Spoonful, the Rolling Stones, the Yardbirds, Sonny & Cher, the Supremes, Herman's Hermits, Frankie Valli and the Four Seasons, the Animals, Roy Orbison and Marianne Faithfull. The first 13 episodes of Hullabaloo included black and white segments taped in London and hosted by the Beatles' manager Brian Epstein where he introduced up and coming British music acts to the American audience. Sid Bernstein was the booking agent for Hullabaloo. Peter Matz, later of The Carol Burnett Show, was the orchestra leader. Peppiatt and Aylesworth were the writers.

Some of the programs in the series were videotaped at NBC Studios in Burbank, California. Most were taped in New York City, either at NBC's Studio 8H in the RCA Building (which was built for Arturo Toscanini and the NBC Symphony Orchestra, and would later house Saturday Night Live), or at NBC's color studio in the Midwood section of Brooklyn (where The Cosby Show would be filmed many years later).

=== Color episodes ===
Much of the series' color videotaped footage was later transferred over to kinescope on film – as such copied in black and white. In 1973, after the show's production company declined to own the original color masters (as NBC was purging much of the content from its archives in the wake of the Financial Interest and Syndication Rules), the episodes were wiped and only three half-hour episodes are known to exist in their original color videotaped form.

The three surviving color episodes were hosted by Michael Landon, Jerry and Gary Lewis (both co-hosted the same episode) and Paul Anka, respectively and featured: the Byrds, and David Winters (Landon), Paul Revere & the Raiders (both Landon and Lewis') the Cyrkle, Lesley Gore, Peter and Gordon (Anka), Gary Lewis & the Playboys, Barry McGuire (Lewis’).

=== Dancers ===
The show was choreographed by David Winters, who selected and choreographed the Hullabaloo Dancers, a team of four men and six women who appeared on a regular basis. Two of them, Michael Bennett and Donna McKechnie, went on to achieve considerable fame on Broadway. Dancer Patrick Adiarte, who also attempted to launch a solo singing career on the series, went on to play Ho-Jon in the television series M*A*S*H. Another female dancer, model/actress Lada Edmund Jr. (known today as Lada St. Edmund), was best known as one of the caged "go-go girl" dancers in the "Hullabaloo A-Go-Go" segment near the closing sequence of the show. She also had a brief recording career with the singles "I Know Something" and "The Larue." She later co-starred with Jon Voight in the 1969 film Out of It and in Act of Vengeance released in 1974. Dancer Suzanne Charney also had some degree of fame on Broadway as the lead frug dancer in Sweet Charity, reprising her role in the 1969 film as well. David Winters went on to direct or produce over 200 TV shows, specials and films.

== Broadcast history ==
The series was originally a one-hour broadcast, airing 8:30–9:30 p.m. on Tuesday. Its first season ran 18 new episodes from January through May 1965 then, from June through August 1965, it featured selected repeats, which aired 10:00–11:00 p.m.

The second season of 30 new episodes ran from September 1965 to April 1966. Reduced to thirty minutes, the episodes aired 7:30–8:00 p.m. on Monday. From May through August 1966 it aired repeats, and was replaced by the sitcom The Monkees in September 1966.

The show was also dubbed and broadcast in Japan. It was broadcast as "ゴー・ゴー・フラバルー" (Go Go Hullabaloo), and was broadcast on NET (now TV Asahi) from January 10, 1966, to March 28, 1966. It replaced Hustle Punch in its time slot.

== Availability ==
Highlights of many of the segments have been compiled for release in VHS and DVD formats. Additionally, a special entitled "Hullabaloo—a 60's Flashback" has been produced under "My Music" umbrella for use by PBS stations during pledge drives; it premiered in March 2013.

== In popular culture ==
Hullabaloo was mentioned in the lyrics of the 1980 Ramones song "Do You Remember Rock 'n' Roll Radio?":

Do you remember Hullabaloo?
Upbeat, Shindig! and Ed Sullivan, too?
Do you remember rock 'n' roll radio?

The show was also featured in the movie Why Do Fools Fall in Love (1998).

In Quentin Tarantino's 2019 film Once Upon a Time in Hollywood, fictional actor Rick Dalton (Leonardo DiCaprio) appears as a guest host on Hullabaloo, singing the 1956 song "Green Door".
