= The Big Revue =

Canadian variety television show

- Written by: John Aylesworth; Frank Peppiatt
- Directed by: Norman Jewison
- Presented by: Budd Knapp; Donald Harron
- Country of origin: Canada
- Original language: English

Production
- Running time: 60 minutes
- Production company: Canadian Broadcasting Corporation

Original release
- Release: 9 September 1952 – 1 May 1953

The Big Revue is a Canadian variety television show. It was the first ever production of CBC Television when both debuted in 1952. The show was directed by Norman Jewison and written by John Aylesworth and Frank Peppiatt. The pilot episode first aired on 9 September 1952.

The series was hosted by actress Toby Robins who would later rise to fame as a panelist on Front Page Challenge. It was on The Big Revue that Don Harron introduced TV audiences to his country bumpkin alter ego, "Charlie Farquharson" (who years later would be immortalized on the American series Hee Haw and the Canadian series The Red Green Show.).

== Reception ==
The Ottawa Journal said the show "all too frequently isn't very good ... the comedy rarely makes anyone laugh, and the dancing at best is mediocre". They complimented the music as "generally excellent", and highlighted George Murphy, Phyllis Marshall, Joan Fairfax and Margo MacKinnon for their "superb singing". The newspaper also pointed out that the show is Canada's "most costly television production, and with one or two exceptions, has been a flop week after week".

The Toronto Star had a different view on the show, writing that it has a "big dash of comedy ... an eyeful of brightness if you are television color blind ... some lovely songs with a punch ... dancing with a point, rhythm ... and fast timing which only seldom goes astray". Additionally, they were impressed with Phyllis Marshall, saying she "hits the bullseye when it comes to television singing ... she combines visual emotion with tone in a way some other television stars could afford to imitate".
