= Niagara, Kentucky =

Unincorporated community in Kentucky, United States

- Unincorporated community
- Location within Kentucky Location within the United States
- Coordinates: 37°43′15″N 87°29′11″W
- Country: United States
- State: Kentucky
- County: Henderson
- Elevation: 479 ft (146 m)
- Time zone: UTC-6 (Central (CST))
  - Summer (DST): UTC-5 (CST)
- GNIS feature ID: 508702

Niagara is an unincorporated community in Henderson County, Kentucky, United States.

The country singer Grandpa Jones was born in Niagara.
