= The Jimmy Dean Show =

- Genre: Comedy; Music; Variety
- Created by: Jimmy Dean
- Written by: Frank Peppiatt; John Aylesworth
- Presented by: Jimmy Dean
- Starring: Jimmy Dean; Jim Henson
- Country of origin: United States
- Original language: English
- No. of seasons: 3
- No. of episodes: 86 (list of episodes)

Production
- Production locations: New York City, US
- Running time: 60 minutes

Original release
- Network: ABC (1963–1966); First-run syndication (1973-1975)
- Release: September 19, 1963 – April 1, 1966

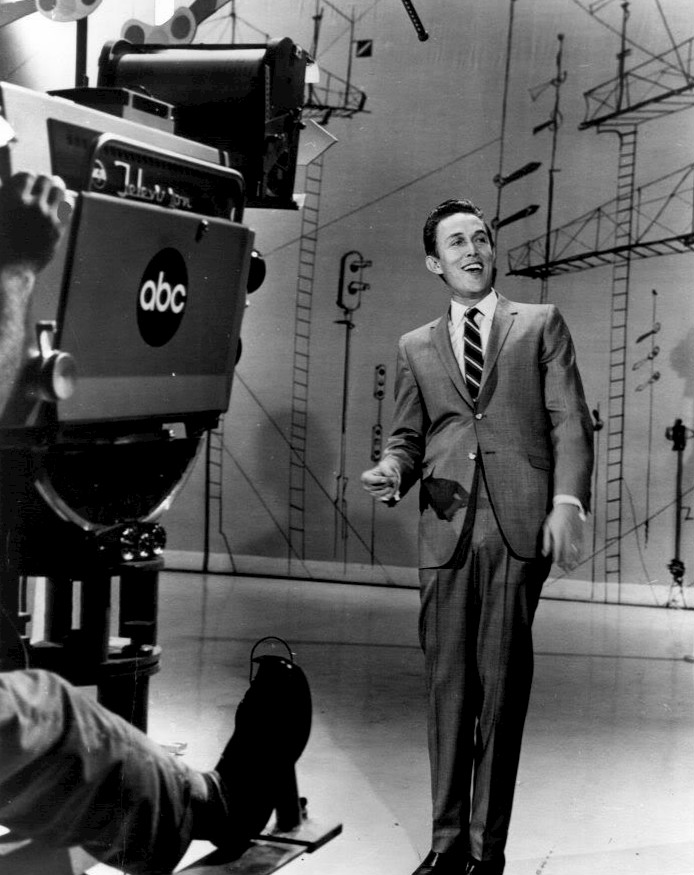
1964

The Jimmy Dean Show is the name of several similar music and variety series on American local and network television between 1963 and 1975. Each starred country music singer Jimmy Dean as host.

Today, the show is best known as the first national exposure for puppeteer Jim Henson with his Muppet character, Rowlf the Dog, who appeared regularly with Dean.

== Daytime ==
The Jimmy Dean Show, initially called Country Style, aired live on WTOP-TV in Washington, D.C. in early 1957. It was picked up by the CBS-TV network from April 8 to December 13, 1957, under the name The Morning Show from 7 to 7:45 a.m. ET Monday–Friday before the station's regular newscast. Guests included Chet Atkins, Jay Chevalier, Billy Walker, Little Jimmy Dickens, George Hamilton IV, and the Country Lads; Mary Klick was a regular. The producer was Connie B. Gay.

CBS then carried The Jimmy Dean Show on its daytime schedule from September 14, 1958, to June 1959 from New York, airing from 2 to 2:30 p.m. ET Monday–Saturday. Guests on the variety program included Hans Conried and Jaye P. Morgan.

== Prime time ==
The Jimmy Dean Show aired as a live half-hour summer series from Washington, D.C. on CBS-TV from June 22 to September 14, 1957, from 10:30 to 11 p.m. on Saturday nights. Guests included Johnny Cash, Jim Reeves, and the Andrews Sisters.

Jimmy Dean and Rowlf the Dog

The Jimmy Dean Show was later an hour-long weekly music and variety television show carried by ABC for three seasons from September 19, 1963, to April 1, 1966, out of ABC Studio One in New York. Its first season was written by Peppiatt and Aylesworth, and Scott Vincent was the announcer. Of the eighty-six episodes produced at ABC, ten shows were made on the road: four at the Ryman Auditorium in Nashville, Tennessee; three at ABC Studios in Hollywood, California; one in Winter Haven, Florida, and one at Carnegie Hall in New York City.

The variety program featured country performers such as George Jones, Buck Owens and Dean's former band member Roy Clark, and pop artists like The Everly Brothers and Gene Pitney. Comics Jackie Mason, Don Adams, and Dick Shawn also appeared. Muppet character Rowlf the Dog (performed by Jim Henson) debuted as a regular on the show, and during the premiere episode of the series in 1963, Dean interacted with an animated Fred Flintstone. The Jimmy Dean Show in 1964 hosted the first television appearance of Hank Williams, Jr., who at the age of fourteen sang several songs associated with his legendary late father, Hank Williams. The show also hosted the first network television appearance of Connie Smith in October 1964, just two months after releasing her number one debut single, Once A Day.

== Jimmy Dean and Rowlf the Dog ==
The show introduced Rowlf the Dog, his Muppet side-kick, who often performed duets with Dean. Introduced each time as Dean's "ol' buddy", Rowlf was Jim Henson's first Muppet to score a regular spot on a network television show and appeared in 85 of the 86 episodes. While Don Sahlin maintained the puppet, Jerry Juhl assisted in writing the Rowlf sketches with the help of the show's staff writers and even assisted Jim Henson and Jimmy Dean on occasion. During production on episodes that featured Rowlf the Dog, Jim Henson would perform Rowlf with the Muppet's right arm operated by Frank Oz, and later by Jerry Nelson. Henson was so grateful for the exposure Dean offered on his show that he in turn proposed that Dean take a 40 percent stake in Henson's company. Dean refused, however, later saying in 2005, "I didn't do anything to earn that."

When it came to an episode of The Ed Sullivan Show that aired on October 8, 1967, Jimmy Dean and Rowlf the Dog were reunited one final time where they performed "Friendship" while doing the "herd of cows" gag.

== Influence ==
Peppiatt and Aylesworth, a Canadian duo who wrote for The Jimmy Dean Show, noted that while it had a country music star, and rural comedy was extremely popular in the 1960s, the show itself had quite little rural humor. In 1969, Peppiatt and Aylesworth created Hee Haw as a way to cater to the rural audience, bringing on two of Dean's most frequent guests as hosts, Buck Owens and Roy Clark.

== ABC schedules ==
- September 1963 – March 1964: Thursday, 9–10 p.m. Eastern Time
- March–August 1964: Thursday, 9:30–10:30 p.m. ET
- September 1964 – September 1965: Thursday, 10–11 p.m. ET
- September 1965 – April 1966: Friday, 10–11 p.m. ET

== Home media and syndication ==
The longer-running prime-time series was produced on black and white videotape which was later disposed of by ABC. Eighty-two of the surviving 1960s reference 16mm Kinescope copies of the series were salvaged from the UCLA Archives by the Jimmy Dean Estate and restored by Donna Dean Stevens Entertainment in 2016 and 2017. In January 2017, the painstakingly remastered Season 1 of the show, which had not been seen in over 50 years, was released as a DVD set. The set includes exclusive interviews with Merle Haggard, Bobby Bare, Bill Anderson, and Donna Dean Stevens.

Remastered by restoration producer and editor Steve Boyle, the restored show began broadcast on RFDTV on January 1, 2017.
