= Bobby Cole (musician) =

American musician (1932–1996)

Bobby Cole (September 8, 1932 – December 19, 1996) was an American musician, known for his jazz singing and piano playing. He was also a jazz composer and arranger. He worked as a musical arranger for The Judy Garland Show hosted by Judy Garland, succeeding Mel Tormé. He conducted the orchestra for her 1967 "Palace" concerts and album and was the conductor and musical director on her last tour.

== Biography and career ==
Bobby Cole was born Robert Kane Sarnicola in New York City and grew up in Astoria, Queens. After service in the U.S. Army, he returned to New York to begin his career. Bobby worked originally with a group called the Bobby Cole Band, composed of members of those musicians he knew from Astoria. The guitarist Peter Buchakian was an early member of his band. He also worked for years with jazz drummer Tony Lupo.

Bobby usually worked as part of a trio; providing lead vocals and piano while working with a bassist and a drummer as well. The Bobby Cole Trio premiered in New York at The Living Room in New York in 1960. Reviewer Dick Hoekstra, who attended Bobby's engagement at the Golden Falcon Lounge in Ft. Lauderdale in the early 1960s observed, "I got a slight suggestion of Cole's talent when I was told that Dan Segal, owner of New York's famed Living Room, was not only in the audience but was Bobby's personal manager. Dan told me that of the countless greats he has booked to play his room, Bobby Cole exceeded any talent that he has ever heard or hired." Bobby's drummers during this period included Bobby Ferris and John Nardozza.

After his stint at the Living Room, Bobby was hired as house pianist at Jilly's, the NYC bistro owned by Frank Sinatra and Jilly Rizzo. Frank called Bobby "my favorite saloon singer," and the two became close friends. Sinatra was under contract with Capitol at the time and through him, Cole was offered a deal at Capitol. Cole refused the deal because he wanted to sing his original compositions, and did not want to conform to the playlist demands of big record labels, or the compromises that producers wanted.

In 1961, Cole agreed to a record deal with Columbia Records on less restraining terms and the same year produced an album with his Trio, which at the time was composed of Bobby on piano and lead vocals, Joseph Sanzo on bass and backup vocals, and Robert Ferro on drums. The album was called NEW NEW NEW and featured a traditional jazz trio setup and traditional jazz arrangements, but it was Cole's youthful voice that had a smoky burr that made it extraordinary. One of Cole's trademark tunes, "The Lady's In Love With You", was on this album as well.

In early 1964, Judy Garland met Bobby at Jilly's in New York. Bobby complimented Garland's "Judy at Carnegie Hall" LP, and she complimented his rendition of "You Fascinate Me So," a Cy Coleman favorite of hers. A few weeks later, Bill Colleran, the executive producer for The Judy Garland Show, fired Mel Tormé and Cole was hired as the musical arranger for the show. The show was canceled in 1964, but in 1967, Garland called upon Cole to conduct the orchestra for her 1967 "Palace" concerts and the album that accompanied these concerts.

Cole eventually made a solo album in 1967. A Point of View was released through Concentric Records which was started by Cole's friend, noted album cover artist Jack Lonshein. At the time, Lonshein was working for Mainstream Records and tried to get Bob Shad, the founder of Mainstream to release an album of Cole's original material, but Shad failed to show interest. Frustrated by this setback, Lonshein started his own record label, Concentric Records, in 1966. When Cole's A Point of View album was finally released on Concentric in 1967, it sold quite well in the New York City area, where he had earned a following mainly through his performances at Jilly's. The album was a remarkable disc of original songs that was an underground sensation for its brash, jazzy up-tunes and some dark ballads including the somber closer, "I'm Growing Old".

At about this time, after hearing musician Jerry Jeff Walker play a yet-to-be recorded composition called "Mr. Bojangles", in a light, folk style at a Greenwich Village club, Cole decided to cover it as a contemplative ballad. A recording of the song was later released on Concentric in 1968. This would be the label's only 7-inch release. Lonshein then licensed the master to Columbia-Date records for better distribution and it began to take off. Unfortunately, Cole's single came out one week after Jerry Jeff Walker’s version. Cole and Walker's versions battled to a draw inside the Billboard Hot 100 charts, with Walker's version peaking at #77 and Cole's version peaking at #79. But it would be Cole's arrangement later used by everyone from Sammy Davis Jr. to George Burns.

As both versions were slowly creeping up the charts in the summer of 1968, a frustrated Bob Shad, thinking he had missed out on an opportunity for a long-awaited hit, hypocritically chastised Lonshein for not releasing the single on Mainstream. Lonshein left Mainstream as a result of this incident and took a job at an all-night record store, awaking early each morning to produce tapes with Cole. Lonshein brought the tapes to the attention of his old friend Phil Picone who at the time was working for MGM. The label expressed some interest but, again, the contract was too strict for Cole.

A skilled arranger and composer, he sometimes tried a change of pace. In April, 1970 he appeared at Caesars Palace in "The World of Jilly Rizzo," a "complete contemporary tone poem by Cole...performed by himself and five other musicians," including Leopoldo F. Fleming, percussionist, Arnold Wise, drums, John Cartwright, bass, John Blair, violin, and Renee Raff, vocals. Between 1973 and 1975 he toured Europe with the Louis Falco Dance Company. His trademark was his strong, jangling piano style (Erroll Garner being an influence) and his unique, rasping delivery which was evidence of his cigarette habit and the nearly forty years spent in smoky nightclubs.

Ruggedly attractive, possessing an imposing Brando-like set of wry frowns and challenging smiles, Bobby married a neighborhood sweetheart before joining the Army, but the pair divorced shortly after he was discharged and returned home. In 1954 he married model Delores Dalland, but the couple divorced in the 1970s because of Bobby's alcohol and drug addictions. One year later they reconciled and remarried, then divorced again. Bobby and Delores had a daughter, Stephanie, and Bobby was stepfather to Delores' two sons from her first marriage.

Bobby continued to perform in New York City venues, including Cafe Versailles, the Ali Baba, a.k.a. "The Mecca of Jazz," with bassist Joel Reiff and drummer Steve Cutler, Ibis, Jimmy Weston's, Sibi, Eleonora's, The Grand Finale, the Big Apple Cafe, the Top Shelf in Pittsburgh, clubs in Atlantic City, and the Aratusa Supper Club, a floating restaurant/nightclub in New Jersey, with Reiff and Cutler.

When Bobby turned up in 1992 for what would be a four-year tenure at the Upper East Side trattoria Campagnola, the New York Times commented that he was the type of singer/pianist who could "create the kind of romantic aura generated in films like Casablanca". As mentioned on the illfolks.blogspot.com, Bobby's rugged lifestyle included too much smoking and drinking, which was a factor in his death. On December 19, 1996, witnesses reported that Bobby, walking toward Campagnola, steadied himself on a lamppost and slowly sank to the sidewalk. He was transported to New York Hospital, still conscious, and died shortly after arrival. Cause of death was a heart attack. He did not die "a tragic death in the gutter," as has been erroneously reported.

== Discography ==
- New New New: The Unique Sound of the Bobby Cole Trio (Columbia, 1960)
- A Point of View (Concentric, 1967)
- Mr. Bojangles (Columbia/Date, 1968)
- A Point of View (reissued with additional tracks by Omnivore Recordings, 2022)
