= After Hours (Canadian TV program) =

Canadian variety television program

- Genre: Variety
- Written by: John Aylesworth; Frank Peppiatt
- Directed by: Norman Campbell
- Presented by: Rick Campbell
- Narrated by: Mike Darrow
- Country of origin: Canada
- Original language: English
- No. of seasons: 1

Production
- Producers: Norman Jewison; John Aylesworth; Frank Peppiatt
- Running time: 30–60 minutes

Original release
- Network: CBC Television
- Release: 2 January 1952 – 3 July 1953

After Hours is a Canadian variety television program that aired on CBC Television in 1953.

The program was an early career effort by John Aylesworth and Frank Peppiatt, who later produced Hee Haw.

== Premise ==
After Hours combines humour sketches with a series of music short films. The music films were produced in the United States by Lou Snader and purchased by CBC Television prior to the network's initial broadcasts. The music films, which resemble music videos, feature songs by performers such as Charlie Barnet, Cab Calloway, Nat King Cole, Duke Ellington, Lionel Hampton, Peggy Lee, George Shearing and Mel Tormé.

The program was hosted by Rick Campbell and announced by Mike Darrow. Jill Foster was a series regular as were producer/writers Aylesworth and Peppiatt. On the 16th episode, the program introduced a three-member band featuring Jack Kane (clarinet), Rudi Toth (piano) and Johnny Niosi (drums) who performed in front of a backdrop painting of sixteen musicians.

== Scheduling ==
The program normally appeared on Fridays at 10:00 p.m. (Eastern), with some episodes airing on Tuesdays and on certain Friday evenings in April and May. Selected Friday episodes were also broadcast earlier during those months. Episodes were hour-long from the 2 January debut until 10 April after which a half-hour format was adopted. The final episode was broadcast on 3 July 1953.
