= The ABC Comedy Hour =

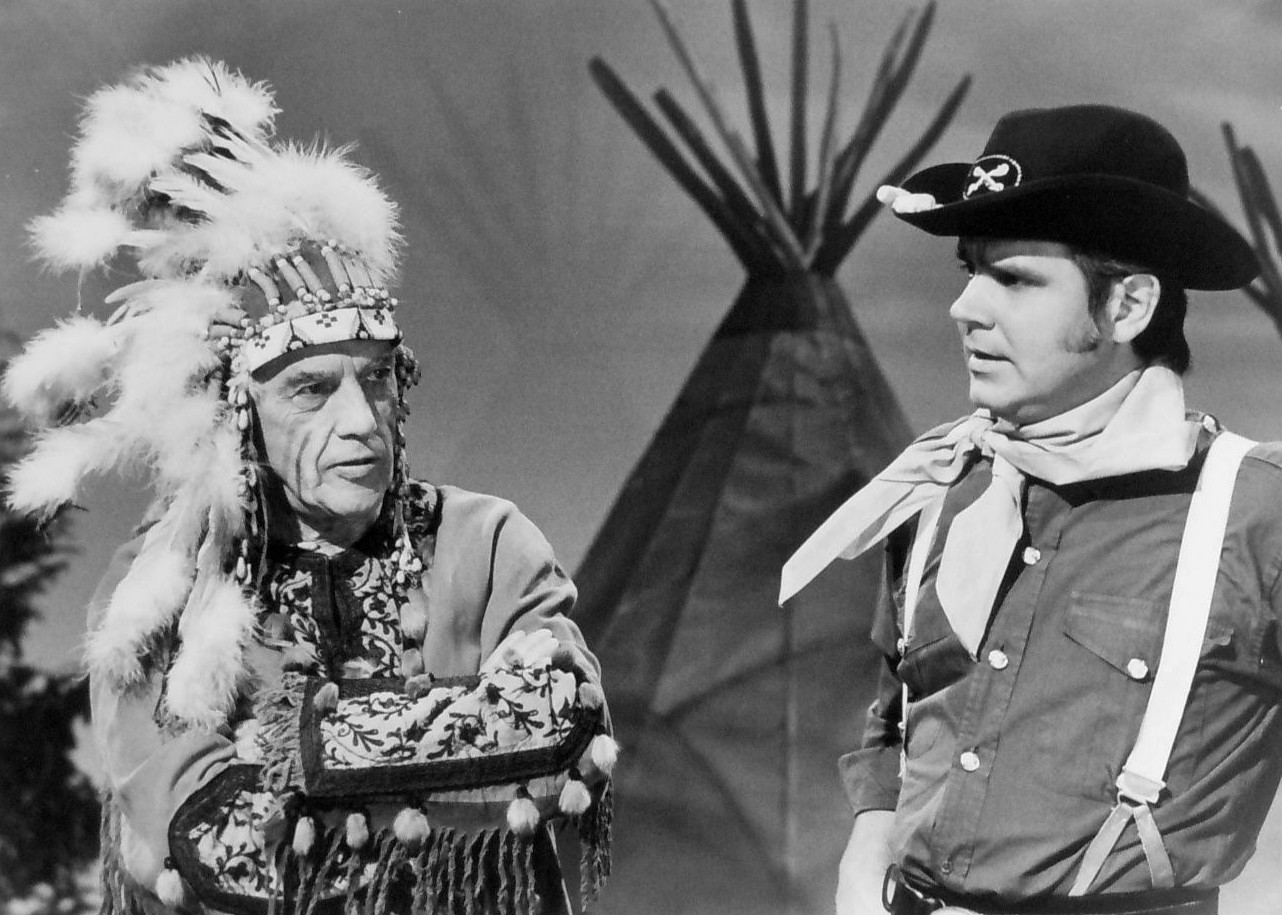
- Ed Sullivan (left) and Rich Little (right) in a show skit.
- Genre: Variety
- Written by: Frank Peppiatt; John Aylesworth; and others
- Country of origin: United States
- Original language: English
- No. of episodes: 13

Production
- Running time: 60 minutes

Original release
- Network: ABC
- Release: January 12 – April 5, 1972

The ABC Comedy Hour is an American television variety series that aired on ABC in 1972. Seven of the 13 episodes featured a guest host and a team of comedy impressionists known as The Kopykats (Rich Little, Frank Gorshin, Joe Baker, Marilyn Michaels, George Kirby, and Fred Travalena, with single appearances by Charlie Callas, Will Jordan, and Peter Goodwright). Guest hosts included Steve Lawrence, Orson Welles, Ed Sullivan, Raymond Burr, Robert Young, Debbie Reynolds and Tony Curtis. The remaining six episodes were variety specials and included two Friars Club roasts and a revival of the musical Hellzapoppin' starring Jack Cassidy and Ronnie Schell. The show was nominated for an Emmy Award in the category of "Outstanding Writing Achievement in Variety or Music."

The show originally aired on Wednesday at 8:30 p.m. Summer reruns of the seven Kopykats episodes were aired under the title The ABC Comedy Hour Presents the Kopykats. The same episodes aired in Great Britain simply as The Kopykats.

The Kopykats first appeared on U.S. television as an episode of Kraft Music Hall on November 11, 1970, on NBC. The cast included Gorshin, Little, Jordan, and Kirby along with Mark Andrews, David Frye and Edie Adams, and appeared a second time with a somewhat different cast on Kraft Music Hall in 1971.
