= Roni Stoneman =

American musician and comedian (1938–2024)

Roni Stoneman-Hemrick
- Publicity photo of Roni Stoneman

Background information
- Birth name: Veronica Loretta Stoneman
- Born: May 5, 1938; Washington, D.C., U.S.
- Died: February 22, 2024 (aged 85); Nashville, Tennessee, U.S.
- Genres: Bluegrass, country
- Occupations: Musician, actress, comedian
- Instrument: Banjo

Veronica Loretta Stoneman (May 5, 1938 – February 22, 2024) was an American bluegrass banjo player and comedian widely known as a cast member on the country music show Hee Haw. She was the youngest daughter of Ernest V. "Pop" Stoneman, patriarch of the Stoneman Family, one of the most famous family groups in early country music.

As a member of the Stoneman Family, she won the Country Music Association Award for Vocal Group of the Year in 1967. She was inducted into the International Bluegrass Music Hall of Fame in 2021 with the rest of her family.

== Early life ==
Roni Stoneman was born on May 5, 1938, to Hattie and pioneering bluegrass musician Ernest "Pop" Stoneman, one of the first musicians to make a career of recording country music, culminating in his hit 1924 song "The Sinking of the Titanic". Stoneman enjoyed a lucrative career until he lost everything during the Great Depression. In 1956, after a winning appearance on a quiz show, Pop resumed his music career, starting a family band with his wife Hattie and some of their children. Roni had learned to play banjo at a young age, and in 1957, joined her family in the band. They won on Arthur Godfrey's Talent Scouts and made many appearances on other TV shows of the day. The Stonemans became a touring act, performing at the White House, the Smithsonian, and in 1962 on the Grand Ole Opry show. They hosted their own TV series, Those Stonemans, from 1966 to 1968, during which they won the CMA's "Vocal Group of the Year" award in 1967.

== Solo career ==
After Pop's death in 1968, 30-year-old Roni, already a virtuoso banjo player, decided to pursue a solo career. She eventually reached a much wider audience in the 1970s, when she joined the cast of the country music show Hee Haw. While she occasionally picked banjo and sang on the show, though her comedic talents garnered more attention; her most prominent character was that of Ida Lee Nagger, which she initially performed in brief sketches with castmate Gordie Tapp as her husband LaVern. Roni became so identified with the character of Ida Lee that she also did other skits in character, including the classic "Pfft! You Were Gone!" song. Later in the series run, Ida Lee adopted a Sadie Hawkins-style persona of a homely spinster, particularly in Hee Haw's "Honky Tonk" sketch, during which she would be chasing numerous men around wielding a large butterfly net.

As of 2020, Roni Stoneman and her older sister, mandolinist Donna Stoneman, continued to perform, sometimes together. Roni and Donna were the last two surviving members of the Stoneman Family band, their older autoharpist sister Patsy Stoneman having died in 2015. Roni entertained at numerous state and county fairs, and appearances also included the UCLA Folk Festival, the Florida State Fair, and the International Sport Show in Canada.

== Death ==
Roni Stoneman died on February 22, 2024, at the age of 85.
