= Will Jordan =

American actor

- Born: Wilbur Rauch; July 27, 1927; The Bronx, New York, U.S.
- Died: September 6, 2018 (aged 91); Manhattan, New York, U.S.
- Occupations: Actor, stand-up comedian
- Years active: 1949−2010

Will Jordan (born William Rauch, July 27, 1927 – September 6, 2018) was an American character actor and stand-up comedian best known for his resemblance to, and impressions of, television host and newspaper columnist Ed Sullivan.

== Early life ==
Born in the Bronx, Rauch grew up in Flushing, Queens. His father was a pharmacist and his mother owned a hat store. Jordan graduated from the American Academy of Dramatic Arts in Manhattan.

== Career ==
=== As Ed Sullivan ===
In his act, Jordan came up with the catch-phrase, "Welcome to our Toast of the Town 'Shoooo'", which became a stereotypical joke for nearly every Sullivan impersonator after that, usually as the more generic "Really Big 'Shoooo'" (or "shoe").

Jordan appeared as Sullivan in the Broadway production of the musical Bye Bye Birdie in 1960–1961 (a role he would reprise in the revival from October 15, 2009, through January 24, 2010).

Most of Jordan's film and television performances since the 1970s have been as Sullivan in films that feature characters appearing on Sullivan's famous variety series. These include:

- I Wanna Hold Your Hand (1978), The Beatles
- The Buddy Holly Story (1978), Buddy Holly and The Crickets
- The Doors (1991), The Doors

In 1983, Jordan appeared as Sullivan in the 1960s-TV-style video for "Tell Her About It", the Billy Joel hit single.

=== Other work ===
Jordan's other impressions included Bing Crosby, Groucho Marx and Jack Benny. He imitated Peter Lorre and James Mason as one of the actors in "Psycho Drama" on Rupert Holmes's 1974 debut album Widescreen.

Jordan performed on the 1970 P.D.Q. Bach recording The Stoned Guest in the role of Milton Host, a send-up of Metropolitan Opera radio announcer Milton Cross.

He also participated in a recording project, called "The Sicknicks", with Sandy Baron. The pair produced a comedy single, "The Presidential Press Conference", which was a minor hit in 1961.

== Personal life and death ==
Jordan had a son, Lonnie Saunders.

On September 6, 2018, writer Mark Evanier announced Jordan died that morning at his Manhattan home at age 91.

== Filmography ==
=== Television ===
Year	Title	Role	Notes
1950	Ford Star Revue		Two episodes
1951	The Steve Allen Show		
1952–1953	The Arthur Murray Party		Four episodes
1954–1968	The Ed Sullivan Show		Eleven episodes
1954	Your Chevrolet Showroom		
1954–1956	Tonight Starring Steve Allen		Two episodes
1955	The Martha Raye Show		Two episodes
1956	Good Morning! with Will Rogers Jr.		
1958	Make Me Laugh		
1958–1962	Tonight Starring Jack Paar		Two episodes
1959	Today		
1961	American Bandstand		
1962–1964	The Red Skelton Show		Two episodes
1962	The Tonight Show Starring Johnny Carson		
1965	That Regis Philbin Show		
1965	The Jimmy Dean Show		
1966–1971	The Merv Griffin Show		Six episodes
1966–1975	The Mike Douglas Show		Two episodes
1968	The Joey Bishop Show		
1968–1971	Kraft Music Hall		Four episodes
1972	The ABC Comedy Hour		
1972	The Bob Braun Show		
1974	Funny Farm		
1978	The Comedy Shop		
1979	Elvis	Ed Sullivan	Television film

=== Film ===
Year	Title	Role	Notes
1960	Top Cat	The Cat, J. Caesar Bandwagon, Russians, Bank Robber, Names Unlimited Men, Movie Men	Animated voice role; uncredited
1961	Cool Cat Blues	The Cat, Smiling Ed Solvent, Bodyguard, Sloppy Louie, Louie's Henchmen, I.O.U. Network President	Animated voice role; uncredited
1961	Hound About That	Hunter, Dog, Fox	Animated voice role; uncredited
1961	Cane and Able	The Cat	Animated voice role; uncredited
1967	Think or Sink	Narrator, Roscoe, Professor Rhinestine	Animated voice role; uncredited
1967	From Orbit to Obit	German Scientist	Animated voice role; uncredited
1967	Forget-Me-Nuts	Narrator, Roscoe, Professor Rhinestine	Animated voice role; uncredited
1977	A Doonesbury Special	Sportscaster	Animated voice role
1978	I Wanna Hold Your Hand	Ed Sullivan	Feature film debut
1978	The Buddy Holly Story	Ed Sullivan	
1983	Billy Joel - Tell Her About It	Ed Sullivan	Music video
1984	Broadway Danny Rose	Himself	
1991	The Doors	Ed Sullivan	
1992	Mr. Saturday Night	Ed Sullivan	
2003	Down with Love	Ed Sullivan	Final appearance
