= Front Page Challenge =

Canadian television series

- Created by: John Aylesworth
- Starring: Win Barron (summer 1957); Alex Barris (fill-in host, 1957); Fred Davis (host fall 1957–1995); Pierre Berton (1957-1995); Allan Fotheringham (1984–1995); Betty Kennedy (1962–1995); Toby Robins (1957–1962); Gordon Sinclair (1957–1984); Jack Webster (1990–1995)
- Country of origin: Canada
- Original language: English

Production
- Running time: 30 min.

Original release
- Network: CBC
- Release: 24 June 1957 – 1 February 1995

Front Page Challenge is a Canadian panel game about current events and history. Created by comedy writer/performer John Aylesworth (of the comedy team of Frank Peppiatt and John Aylesworth) and produced and aired by CBC Television, the series ran from 1957 to 1995.

== Synopsis ==
The series featured notable journalists attempting to guess the recent or old news story with which a hidden guest challenger was linked by asking him or her questions, in much the same manner as the American quiz shows, What's My Line? and To Tell the Truth. Each round of the game started with news footage that introduced the story in question to the studio audience and home viewers out of earshot of the panellists. After the guest was identified and/or the news story determined, the journalists then interviewed the guest about the story or about achievements or experiences for which he or she was known. Unlike American quiz shows that steered clear of controversy in the 1950s and 1960s, Front Page Challenge seems to have been affected by just one censorship practice, that of avoiding four-letter words.

Guests came from all walks of life, including politicians like Pierre Trudeau and Indira Gandhi, activists like Malcolm X, sports figures like Gordie Howe, entertainers like Boris Karloff and Ed Sullivan, and writers like Upton Sinclair. From 1957 to 1979, the show featured many non-Canadians whose trips to Canada were paid by the CBC. (Gandhi was even flown from India to Toronto in the 1960s at the CBC's expense.) Occasionally, guests were featured for their involvement in stories that had nothing to do with their celebrity status. For example, in 1958 Karloff was featured because he had served as a rescue worker in the aftermath of a devastating 1912 tornado in Regina, Saskatchewan, where he had been appearing in a play many years before horror films made him famous.

Jayne Mansfield appeared on the Tuesday night telecast of 12 December 1961 representing the victories two years earlier of British prime minister Harold Macmillan and his Conservative Party in the 1959 United Kingdom general election. The American actress, whose high IQ was well-publicized, was filming a movie in the United Kingdom in 1959 when she and others connected with the movie read and heard about the election results. The CBC archive has two photographs of Mansfield during her 1961 visit to the Toronto television studio where Front Page Challenge always originated during that era, but the videotape of her episode was lost due to wiping.

Occasionally, the challenger on Front Page Challenge was one of the panellists themselves, unbeknownst to the other three panellists. After the game, the relevant person simply moved to the guest seat for the interview.

The show ran for nearly 40 years and featured a remarkably stable cast of panellists, including journalist-historian Pierre Berton, Betty Kennedy (who later become a Canadian senator), Toby Robins (who later became a movie actress) and radio commentator Gordon Sinclair. Columnist Allan Fotheringham joined the panel after Sinclair's death. A guest panellist, usually another Canadian journalist, politician or other celebrity, was also part of each episode. In 1990, journalist and radio/television personality Jack Webster joined the show as its permanent fourth panellist.

For its initial summer 1957 run, the show was hosted by Win Barron, best known for his voice-over narration of newsreels produced by the Canadian division of Paramount Pictures. However, Barron proved ill at ease in the moderator's seat, so both Fred Davis and panellist Alex Barris rotated as guest hosts in the early part of the fall before Davis was chosen to take over as host full-time (a position he retained for the rest of the show's run), though Barris continued to appear as a guest panellist occasionally and was the show's writer for the duration of its run. In 1981, the CBC published an oversized book written by Barris about the history of the program. It was titled Front Page Challenge: The 25th Anniversary. Four years after the show's cancellation, another book by Barris was published chronicling the last fifteen years of the show. It included more details and anecdotes about the show's earlier phases not found in his first book.

Several weeks after its debut, Ottawa Citizen television columnist Bob Blackburn deemed the programme to be noticeably improved and predicted that if that trend continued "and if the program doesn't run dry on its slightly limited subject matter, Front Page Challenge might well become an institution on Canadian TV".

In his book, Barris says that at the height of the show's popularity in the late 1950s, the individual panellists became major celebrities in Canada. He relates how Toby Robins, a beautiful brunette, donned a blonde wig for a few episodes as an experiment, attracting hate mail including a death threat over the change of appearance. The books also include journalist Barbara Frum's remarks about how influential Robins was for 1950s-era female equality through her decision to appear on the program while pregnant.

The show's stability proved to be its undoing, as the producers did not see fit to add younger panellists while the regulars aged and the audience demographics became less desirable. The show always was videotaped in or aired live from Toronto prior to 1966. During that year four shows originated from Montreal including one with challenger Jessica Mitford. The show continued going on the road, being videotaped in cities across Canada. The oldest regular, Gordon Sinclair, continued travelling with his fellow panellists to videotaping locations until he was well into his 80s. Although the location of the studio was not always noticeable to home viewers, they did notice the lack of guest challengers from foreign countries after 1979. The program no longer featured internationally known controversial figures to match the likes of Timothy Leary, Indira Gandhi, Menachem Begin (when he was a Knesset member) and William F. Buckley who had held viewers' attention in the 1960s and most of the 1970s. Alex Barris says in his second book that the absence of non-Canadian guests after 1979 resulted from budget cuts for CBC Television that ruled out travel expenses.

Barris also claims that the advent of multiple cable channels in the 1980s and early 1990s (in cities, towns and rural areas near the border of the United States where people could receive programming from both countries) presented another challenge to the staff of Front Page Challenge and contributed to its demise. Prior to the 1980s when there were no 24-hour news channels competing with Front Page Challenge, each round of the game began with silent black-and-white newsreel footage of the news story in question while a narrator, not heard by the panellists, summarized it. Even after the segments started including colour videotape, the only voice heard introducing the topical issue and the challenger was the voice of the narrator of Front Page Challenge.

Producers continued to use the same off-screen narrator, which made the Front Page Challenge footage less appealing to young people than the multiple sound bites featured by CBC Newsworld, which began 24-hour newscasts throughout Canada on 31 July 1989. CBC Newsworld offered sound bite interviews with people who had witnessed events or were knowledgeable about them. Young viewers using remote controls stuck with the multiple sound bites and ignored the Front Page Challenge narrator's summaries of the news stories, according to the book by Alex Barris published in 1999. As the pace of 1980s news quickened, even before the launch of CBC Newsworld, Fred Davis, Betty Kennedy and Pierre Berton obviously remained mentally sharp enough to follow all of it, but they had not witnessed 99 percent of the events about which they were so curious. Young viewers in the 1980s were accustomed to listening to people who had witnessed current events or had made them happen.

When Front Page Challenge ceased production in 1995, it was the longest continually running non-news program in Canadian television history. Among the contestants on the final show was then-emerging country music superstar Shania Twain.

== Episode status ==
Reruns of the program were broadcast by Canadian cable channel History Television (now simply called History) in the late 1990s. At least a few of the episodes from the 1950s and 1960s were not saved. In his second book about the program, Alex Barris tells an anecdote about what guest panellist Bennett Cerf said to challenger Jesse Owens about Adolf Hitler during a 1958 episode. The CBC archive has a clip that lasts less than one minute in which Cerf and Owens have this exchange, but the rest of the episode does not survive.

1960s episodes that featured Menachem Begin, then a Knesset member, Jayne Mansfield, William F. Buckley, Arthur Schlesinger Jr. and Timothy Leary were lost in their entirety.

== Guests ==
- Errol Flynn, 13 January 1959 (CBC Archives video clip)
- Indira Gandhi
- Rick Hansen, 18 December 1987 (CBC Archives video clip)
- William Leonard Higgitt, 7 October 1971
- Gordie Howe
- Boris Karloff
- Eleanor Roosevelt
- Upton Sinclair
- Pierre Trudeau
- Malcolm X, 5 January 1965 (CBC Archives video clip)

== References in pop culture ==
- On Canadian Sesame Street, the game show was parodied as Front Page Vegetable.
- In a 1982 episode of SCTV, the game show was parodied as Headline Challenge, the name being a combination of Front Page Challenge and another headline-based game show, CTV's Headline Hunters.
