= The Julie Andrews Hour =

- Genre: Variety show
- Written by: Frank Peppiatt and John Aylesworth; George Arthur Bloom; Bob Ellison; Lila Garrett; Hal Goodman; Larry Klein
- Starring: Julie Andrews; Supporting cast: Rich Little; Alice Ghostley; Garrett Lewis; The Dick Williams Singers; Choreographer: Tony Charmoli
- Announcer: Dick Tufeld
- Theme music composer: Richard Rodgers and Oscar Hammerstein II
- Opening theme: "The Sound of Music"
- Ending theme: "Time Is My Friend"
- Composers: Julie Andrews and Leslie Bricusse
- Country of origin: United Kingdom
- Original language: English
- No. of seasons: 1
- No. of episodes: 24

Production
- Executive producers: Nick Vanoff; William O. Harbach
- Production companies: ATV; ITC Entertainment

Original release
- Network: ITV (UK); ABC (USA)
- Release: 1972 – 1973

The Julie Andrews Hour is a television variety series starring Julie Andrews that was produced by ATV and distributed by ITC Entertainment. It aired on the ABC television network in the United States. It was known as The Julie Andrews Show in the United Kingdom, and aired there on the ITV network.

== Production history ==
In order to secure Andrews, Sir Lew Grade and ABC offered her a generous five-year contract which included not only Andrews starring in a weekly television variety show, but also allowing her to do films. In 1963, when another major star, Judy Garland, was signed to a weekly television variety series, it failed to catch on with the public. One of the main reasons for its demise was its constant change of format and the fact that critics and audiences felt that Garland was not shown off to her best advantage. In order to avoid that error, Andrews asked producer Nick Vanoff what the premise of the show would be about. Vanoff immediately answered her by saying "Julie Andrews ... without Julie Andrews there is no Julie Andrews Hour."

The premiere instalment of the show was presented on Wednesday, 13 September 1972 at 10 p.m. ET. As a way of introducing Julie Andrews to the vast television audience, the entire hour of the first episode showcased the singer performing in musical numbers ranging from her years on Broadway (The Boy Friend, My Fair Lady, and Camelot) to her motion picture career (Mary Poppins, The Sound of Music, and Star!). Appearing with Andrews on this episode were impressionist Rich Little and comedienne Alice Ghostley (who had appeared with Andrews in the 1957 CBS live television version of Rodgers & Hammerstein's Cinderella). Both Little and Ghostley would become semi-regulars.

The series received positive reviews. Unfortunately, its American time slot proved to be daunting because it was up against the popular CBS detective series, Cannon. The late later time slot of 10 p.m. was also a factor, too late for children and families. On Thanksgiving Eve, 22 November 1972, The Julie Andrews Hour devoted an entire episode saluting Walt Disney. To make it more of a "family special", ABC switched the time slot of The Julie Andrews Hour that night to 8:30 p.m. and The ABC Wednesday Movie Of The Week to 9:30 p.m. The ratings improved a little, so ABC then made a decision to alternate Andrews' time period each week. (One week it would be 10:00 p.m., and the next week it would be 8:30 p.m.) This continued until January 1973, when the series was moved to Saturday nights at 9:00 p.m. The ratings went from bad to worse, as Andrews' chief competition was The Mary Tyler Moore Show and The Bob Newhart Show (both highly rated series) on CBS. (Ironically, Moore had been Andrews' co-star in the 1967 hit film, Thoroughly Modern Millie.)

Andrews was nominated for a Golden Globe Award (for Best Actress In A Leading Role — Musical Or Comedy Series for the show); she lost out to Jean Stapleton in All in the Family. When the 1972-1973 Emmy Award nominations were announced, The Julie Andrews Hour received an impressive ten nominations.

Despite this achievement and positive reviews, ABC announced it was cancelling the series after its 24th episode in April 1973. After Andrews completed the last installment of the program, she and her husband Blake Edwards left for Barbados to film The Tamarind Seed which was part of her contract agreement with ABC and ITC. In May, 1973, The Julie Andrews Hour went on to win seven Emmy Awards out of its ten nominations, including the Outstanding Variety Musical Series award given to the show's producers, Nick Vanoff and William O. Harbach, and the star.

In recognition of all the awards the show received, ABC and ITV offered Andrews five variety specials which were produced in England between 1973 and 1975, also under the auspices of Lew Grade. This was also arranged to help fulfill Andrews's five-year contract. After her fifth special aired in the spring of 1975, the contract was mutually dissolved. In the late 1970s and early 1980s, several edited episodes of The Julie Andrews Hour were shown on syndicated stations throughout the United States as "specials".

== Musical themes ==
The show opened with an excerpt of the title song from The Sound of Music by Rodgers and Hammerstein. Andrews performed "Time Is My Friend" to close each episode. The music was written by Andrews with lyrics by her close friend Leslie Bricusse.
