= Frank Peppiatt =

Canadian television producer and screenwriter

- Born: March 19, 1927; Toronto, Ontario
- Died: November 7, 2012 (aged 85); Ponte Vedra Beach, Florida
- Education: University of Toronto
- Occupations: Television producer and screenwriter
- Spouse: Caroline Peppiatt
- Children: Francesca Robyn Marney Peppiatt and Melissa Peppiatt MacIssac
- Relatives: Frank and Sarah Peppiatt
- Writing career
- Genre: Variety show
- Notable work: The Sonny & Cher Comedy Hour

Frank Peppiatt (March 19, 1927 – November 7, 2012) was a television producer and screenwriter, considered a pioneer of the variety show genre. His credits included The Sonny & Cher Comedy Hour. Most notably, co-created the variety show, Hee Haw, in 1969 with John Aylesworth.

Peppiatt was born to Frank and Sarah Peppiatt in Toronto, Ontario, on March 19, 1927. He attended the University of Toronto, where he earned a bachelor's degree in 1949. He took a job with his Toronto classmate, Norman Jewison, after college working on college stage productions. Peppiatt then worked as an advertising copywriter at MacLaren Advertising where he met and worked with John Aylesworth. Their work on television advertising led the Canadian Broadcasting Corporation to approach them to write comedy sketches for a variety show called After Hours. This led to a long professional partnership with Aylesworth. Peppiatt made the jump from Canadian to American television by the mid-1950s.

In addition to Hee Haw, Peppiatt and Aylesworth teamed up to write or produce Perry Como's Kraft Music Hall, The Judy Garland Show, Frank Sinatra: A Man and His Music, The ABC Comedy Hour, The Julie Andrews Hour, and Hullabaloo. They were known as one of the most prolific writing and producing teams in television variety show history.

Peppiatt died from bladder cancer in Ponte Vedra Beach, Florida, on November 7, 2012, at the age of 85. His autobiography, When Variety Was King: Memoir of a TV Pioneer, was published posthumously by ECW Press in April 2013.
