= Hee Haw =

American television variety show (1969–93 and 1996–97)

- Genre: Comedy; Music
- Created by: Frank Peppiatt; John Aylesworth
- Presented by: Buck Owens; Roy Clark
- Starring: Archie Campbell; Roy Acuff; Gordie Tapp; Grandpa Jones; Junior Samples; David "Stringbean" Akeman; Roni Stoneman; Lulu Roman; Minnie Pearl; Don Harron; Mike Snider
- Country of origin: United States
- Original language: English
- No. of seasons: 26
- No. of episodes: 655

Production
- Production locations: WLAC-TV (now WTVF), Nashville, Tennessee, U.S. (1969–1982); Grand Ole Opry House (Studio A), Nashville, Tennessee, U.S. (1982–1993)
- Running time: 44 minutes
- Production companies: Yongestreet Productions; Gaylord Entertainment

Original release
- Network: CBS (1969–1971); First-run syndication
- Release: June 15, 1969 – 1993

Related
- Hee Haw Honeys; Hee Haw Silver

Hee Haw is an American television variety show featuring country music and humor with the fictional rural "Kornfield Kounty" as the backdrop. It aired from 1969 to 1993. Reruns of the series were broadcast on TNN from 1996 to 1997, on RFD-TV from September 2008 to April 2020, and aired on Circle. The Hee Haw reruns resumed in May 2024 on the RFD-TV / RuralTV network.

The show was inspired by Rowan & Martin's Laugh-In, but centered on country music, rural rather than pop culture–inspired humor, and with far less topical material. Hosted by country music artists Buck Owens and Roy Clark for most of its run, the show was equally well known for its cornpone humor as for its voluptuous, scantily clad women (the "Hee Haw Honeys") in stereotypical farmer's daughter outfits.

Hee Haw's appeal, however, was not limited to a rural audience. It was successful in all of the major markets, including network-based Los Angeles and New York City, as well as Boston and Chicago. Other niche programs such as The Lawrence Welk Show and Soul Train, which targeted older and black audiences, respectively, also rose to prominence in syndication during the era. Like Laugh-In, the show minimized production costs by taping all of the recurring sketches for a season in batches, setting up the cornfield set one day, the joke fence on another, etc. At its peak, a season's worth of shows were recorded over the course of two separate, week-long shoots, and then assembled in the editing suite. Only musical performances were taped with a live audience, while a laugh track was added to all other segments.

The series was taped for the CBS Television Network at its station affiliate WLAC-TV (now WTVF) in downtown Nashville, Tennessee, and later at Opryland USA in the city's Donelson area. The show was produced by Yongestreet Productions through the mid-1980s; it was later produced by Gaylord Entertainment, which distributed the show in syndication. The show's name, derived from a common English onomatopoeia used to describe a donkey's braying, was coined by show-business talent manager and producer Bernie Brillstein.

The series initially ended its run in June 1993, after 25 seasons. It was soon picked up by TNN for reruns.

== Synopsis ==
Hee Haw is set in Kornfield Kounty, a rural farming community in an unspecified state in the Southern United States. The show's sketches mostly center around visits to local businesses in the county and the offbeat characters who live and work there.

=== Recurring sketches and segments ===
Some of the most popular sketches and segments on Hee Haw included:

- "PFFT! You Was Gone!" – A comedic duet featured on the premiere episode. In the first few seasons, the song was performed by Archie Campbell, with Gordie Tapp joining on the chorus. In later seasons, a guest star would join Campbell on the chorus, and the guest star's name would often be mentioned somewhere in the song's verse prior to the chorus. On episodes that featured more than one guest star, the sketch was repeated so that all the guest stars had an opportunity to participate. Rarely, a surprise guest star would appear who was not otherwise featured in the episode. The guest star often stood with his back to the camera while holding a pitchfork, while Campbell sang the verse while holding a scythe. At the end of the verse, Campbell would nudge the guest star with his elbow and the guest star would spin around to the camera to join on the chorus:
  Where, oh where, are you tonight?
  Why did you leave me here all alone?
  I searched the world over and thought I'd found true love,
  You met another and PFFT! You was gone!
  The "PFFT" would be done as "blowing a raspberry"; the one who got spat upon during the "PFFT" changed for each show. Following Campbell's death, whole groups and even women would be part of the chorus, with George Lindsey often singing the verse. Occasionally, Roni Stoneman (in her role of Ida Lee Nagger) would sometimes sing the verse. The song was written by Lee Roberts and recorded in 1952 by country singer Bob Newman.
- KORN News – Don Harron as KORN radio announcer Charlie Farquharson would spoof the delivery of local news. In later seasons, KORN became KORV. Harron had been performing the character since 1952 on Canadian television, and continued playing Farquharson in many other media venues before, during, and after Hee Haw.
- The Moonshiners – Two of the male cast members, playing lethargic hillbillies, lazily told a joke while dozing on the floor near a bunch of moonshine jugs and Beauregard the Wonder Dog, with three or four of the Hee Haw Honeys reclining in the background.
- Pickin' and Grinnin – Musical interludes with Owens (on guitar) and Clark (on banjo) and the entire cast (Owens: "Well, I'm a-pickin'!"; Clark: "And IIIII'm a-grinnin'!"), with the duo (and sometimes a major guest star—such as Johnny Cash—sitting between Owens and Clark) "dueling" by playing guitar and banjo the instrumental to "Cripple Creek", telling jokes and reciting one-liners. The sketch always ended with Clark's banjo solo, each time ending a different comical way. For the first two the sketch featured only Clark and Owens, and in later seasons the entire cast participated. When the entire cast began participating, the sketch was introduced by the show's emcee Cathy Baker. This sketch at first would always open the second half of the show before alternating with the "Hee Haw Honky Tonk" sketch in the later seasons.
- Samples Used Car Sales – Junior Samples, as a used car salesman, would try to palm off a major "clunker" in a parody TV commercial, ending each sketch reminding viewers of the phone number- BR-549.
- "Gloom, Despair, and Agony on Me" – Another popular sketch, it was usually performed by four male cast members (originally—and usually—Roy Clark; Gordie Tapp; Grandpa Jones and Archie Campbell) sitting around in hillbilly garb surrounded by moonshine jugs and looking overtly miserable. The song began with the chorus, which all of them sang with each one alternating (in lip-synch) a mournful howl after each of the first three lines. The chorus went:
  Gloom, despair, and agony on me-e!
  Deep dark depression, excessive misery-y!
  If it weren't for bad luck, I'd have no luck at all!
  Gloom, despair, and agony on me-e-e!
  The quartet began by singing the chorus together, followed by each quartet member reciting some humorous reason for his misery in spoken form, then (in the first several seasons) the quartet reprised the chorus and end with all four sobbing in typical overstated manner.
- The Gossip Girls – This sketch is the female counterpart to "Gloom, Despair...", which featured four female cast members surrounding a washtub and clothes wringer singing the chorus:
  Now, we're not ones to go 'round spreadin' rumors,
  Why, really we're just not the gossipy kind,
  No, you'll never hear one of us repeating gossip,
  So you'd better be sure and listen close the first time!
  Two of the four girls then sang the verse. Misty Rowe, a long-time member of the "Gossip Girls", enhanced the comedy of the sketch by singing her part of the verse out of tune (as a young child would do). In later years, male cast members, in drag, sometimes replaced the girls in the sketch, in retaliation for the girls singing "Gloom, Despair..." Sometimes, in later seasons, the four female cast members sang the song on the cornfield set, with a male guest star standing in the center, between the four girls.
- "Hee Haw Salutes ..." – Two or three times in each episode, Hee Haw saluted a selected town (or a guest star's hometown) and announce its population, which was sometimes altered for levity, at which point the entire cast would then "pop up" in the cornfield set, shouting "SAA-LUTE!!" Initially ending with laughter, this was changed by the mid-1970s to applause as a nod toward legitimately saluting small-town America. Also in the early 1980s, John Henry Faulk saluted a figure in American history, which received the same appropriate nodding applause. In the later seasons, the cast said "Salute" on the Pickin' and Grinnin' set.

== Cast ==
Rural-style comedians Gordie Tapp and Don Harron gained their first major U.S. exposure on Hee Haw.

Other cast members over the years included: Roy Acuff, Cathy Baker, Willie Ackerman, Billy Jim Baker, Barbi Benton, Kelly Billingsley, Vicki Bird, Jennifer Bishop, Archie Campbell, Phil Campbell, Harry Cole (Weeping Willie), Mackenzie Colt, John Henry Faulk, Tennessee Ernie Ford, Diana Goodman, Marianne Gordon (Rogers), Jim and Jon Hager, Victoria Hallman, Little Jimmy Henley, Gunilla Hutton, Linda Johnson, Grandpa Jones, Zella Lehr (the "unicycle girl"), George Lindsey (reprising his "Goober" character from The Andy Griffith Show), Little Jimmy Dickens, Irlene Mandrell, Charlie McCoy, Dawn McKinley, Patricia McKinnon, Sherry Miles, Rev. Grady Nutt, Minnie Pearl, Claude "Jackie" Phelps, Slim Pickens, Kenny Price, Anne Randall, Chase Randolph, Susan Raye, Jimmie Riddle, Jeannine Riley, Alice Ripley, Lulu Roman, Misty Rowe, Junior Samples, Ray Sanders, Terry Sanders, Gailard Sartain, Diana Scott, Shotgun Red, Gerald Smith (the "Georgia Quacker"), Jeff Smith, Mike Snider, Donna Stokes, Dennis Stone, Roni Stoneman, Mary Taylor, Nancy Taylor, Linda Thompson, Lisa Todd, Pedro Tomas, Nancy Traylor, Buck Trent, Jackie Waddell, Pat Woodell, and Jonathan Winters, among many others.

The Buckaroos (Buck Owens' band) initially served as the house band on the show and consisted of members Don Rich, Jim Shaw, Jerry Brightman, Jerry Wiggins, Rick Taylor, Doyle Singer (Doyle Curtsinger), Don Lee, Ronnie Jackson, Terry Christoffersen, Doyle Holly, Jana Jae, and Victoria Hallman, who replaced Don Rich on harmony vocals. In later seasons, the show hired Nashville musicians to serve as the show's house band. George Richey was the first music director. When he left to marry Tammy Wynette, harmonica player Charlie McCoy, already a member of the band when he was not playing on recording sessions, became the show's music director, forming the Hee Haw Band, which became the house band for the remainder of the series' run. The Nashville Edition, a singing quartet consisting of two males and two females, served as the background singers for most of the musical performances, along with performing songs on their own.

=== Guest stars ===
Hee Haw featured at least two, and sometimes three or four, guest celebrities each week. While most of the guest stars were country music artists, a wide range of other famous luminaries were featured from actors and actresses to sports stars to politicians.

Sheb Wooley, one of the original cast members, wrote the show's theme song. After filming the initial 13 episodes, other professional demands caused him to leave the show, but he returned from time to time as a guest star.

Loretta Lynn was the first guest star of Hee Haw and made more guest appearances (24) than any other artist. She also co-hosted the show more than any other guest co-host and therefore appears on more of the DVD releases for retail sale than any other guest star. Tammy Wynette was second with 21 guest appearances, and Wynette married George Richey (the musical director for Hee Haw from 1970 to 1977) in 1978.

From 1990 to 1992, country megastar Garth Brooks appeared on the show four times. In 1992, producer Sam Lovullo tried unsuccessfully to contact Brooks because he wanted him for the final show. Brooks then surprised Lovullo by showing up at the last minute, ready to don his overalls and perform for the final episode.

=== Elvis connection ===
Elvis Presley was a fan of Hee Haw and wanted to appear as a guest on the program, but Presley knew his manager, Colonel Tom Parker, would not allow him to do so (following Presley's death, Parker would be sued by Elvis Presley Enterprises for mismanagement). Two of the Hee Haw Honeys dated Presley long before they joined the cast: Linda Thompson in the mid-1970s, with whom Presley had a long-term relationship after his divorce from Priscilla; and Diana Goodman shortly afterwards. Charlie McCoy played harmonica on a select few of Presley's recordings in the late 1960s, Joe Babcock of the Nashville Edition also sang backup vocals on a couple of his recordings at that time, and the Nashville Edition sang backup on Presley's recording of "Early Morning Rain." Shortly after Presley's death, his father, Vernon Presley, made a cameo appearance on the show, alongside Thompson and Buck Owens, and paid tribute to his late son, noting how much Elvis enjoyed watching the show, and introduced one of his favorite gospel songs, which was performed by the Hee Haw Gospel Quartet.

== Production ==
=== Creation ===
Hee Haw's creators, Frank Peppiatt and John Aylesworth, were both Canadian-born writers who had extensive experience in writing for variety shows. Inspired by the enormous prior success of rural sitcoms of the 1960s, especially on CBS, which included the small-town sympathetic The Andy Griffith Show, followed by the country-parodying The Beverly Hillbillies, Petticoat Junction and Green Acres, Peppiatt and Aylesworth sought to create a variety show catering to the same audience—although neither one had a firm grasp on rural comedy.

The producers selected a pair of hosts who represented each side in a divide in country/western music at the time: Buck Owens was a prominent architect of the California-based Bakersfield sound and one of the biggest country hitmakers of the 1960s. Roy Clark, who had worked in Washington, D.C., and Las Vegas, was a stalwart of Nashville's Music Row known for his skill at mixing music and comedy onstage. Both Clark and Owens had been regular guests on The Jimmy Dean Show during Peppiatt and Aylesworth's time writing for that series. Peppiatt and Aylesworth brought on two fellow Canadian writers with more experience in rural humor, Gordie Tapp and Don Harron; Harron would appear in the recurring role of "Charlie Farquharson", the rural anchorman for station KORN. The producers also scored a country comedy expert familiar to rural audiences in Archie Campbell, who co-starred in and wrote many of the jokes and sketches, along with Tapp, George Yanok and comedian Jack Burns (who himself had briefly replaced Don Knotts on The Andy Griffith Show) in the sixth season.

=== Stage settings ===
A barn interior set was used as the main stage for most of the musical performances from the show's premiere until the debut of the "Hee Haw Honky Tonk" sketch in the early 1980s. Afterwards, the "Hee Haw Honky Tonk" set would serve as the main stage for the remainder of the series' run. Buck Owens then began using the barn interior set for his performances after it was replaced by the "Hee Haw Honky Tonk" set and was named "Buck's Place" (as a nod to one of Owens' hits, "Sam's Place"). Other settings for the musical performances throughout the series' run included a haystack (where the entire cast performed songs), the living room of a Victorian house, the front porch and lawn of the Samuel B. Sternwheeler home, a grist mill (where Roy Clark performed many of his songs in earlier seasons), and a railroad depot, where Buck Owens performed his songs before acquiring "Buck's Place."

=== Music ===
Hee Haw featured a premiere showcase on commercial television throughout its run for country, bluegrass, gospel, and other styles of American traditional music, featuring hundreds of elite musical performances that were paramount to the success, popularity and legacy of the series for a broad audience of Southern, rural and purely music fans alike. Although country music was the primary genre of music featured on the show, guest stars and cast members alike also performed music from other genres, such as rock 'n' roll oldies, big band, and pop standards.

Some of the music-based segments on the show (other than guest stars' performances) included:

- The Million Dollar Band – This was an instrumental band formed of legendary Nashville musicians Chet Atkins (guitar), Boots Randolph (saxophone), Roy Clark (guitar), Floyd Cramer (piano), Charlie McCoy (harmonica), Danny Davis (trumpet), Jethro Burns (mandolin), Johnny Gimble (fiddle), backed by a rhythm section consisting of Nashville session musicians Willie Ackerman (drums), Henry Strzelecki (Bass) and Bobby Thompson (banjo/acoustic guitar); who would frequently appear on the show from 1980 through 1988. The band would perform an instrumental version of a popular song, with each member showcasing his talent on his respective instrument.
- The Hee Haw Gospel Quartet – Beginning in the latter part of the 1970s, this group sang a gospel hymn just before the show's closing. The original lineup consisted of Buck Owens (lead), Roy Clark (tenor), Grandpa Jones (baritone), and Tennessee Ernie Ford (bass). Ford was later replaced by Kenny Price. In contrast to Hee Haw's general levity, the Quartet's performance was appropriately treated solemnly, with no laughter or applause from the audience. Jones did not wear his signature hat during the segment, and would frequently appear entirely out of his "Grandpa" costume. In the first few seasons that featured the Quartet, cast member Lulu Roman would introduce the group along with the hymn they were about to perform. Several of the Quartet's performances were released as recordings. Joe Babcock took over as lead singer after Owens left the show, and Ray Burdette took over as bass singer after the death of Kenny Price; but the Quartet was not featured as often from that point on. However, the show still closed with a gospel song—if not by the Quartet, then by either the entire cast, a guest gospel artist, or cast member Lulu Roman (a gospel artist in her own right). The concept of the Quartet was based on the 1940s group the Brown's Ferry Four, which recorded for King Records and included Grandpa Jones, the Delmore Brothers and Merle Travis. Jones suggested the idea to the show's producers, supported by Clark.
- The Hagers – This twin brother singing duo would also perform a song each week on the show. They would often perform their own versions of pop/rock songs from the 1960s and 1970s.
- Performances by cast members – In addition to hosts Buck Owens and Roy Clark, who would perform at least one song each week, other cast members—such as Gunilla Hutton, Misty Rowe, Victoria Hallman, Grandpa Jones (sometimes with his wife Ramona), Kenny Price, Archie Campbell, Barbi Benton, The Nashville Edition, Vicki Bird, and Diana Goodman—would occasionally perform a song on the show; and the show would almost always open with a song performed by the entire cast.
- The Hee Haw Cowboy Quartet – This group, patterned after the Hee Haw Gospel Quartet, was short-lived, having formed near the end of the series' run. Like the group name suggests; the quartet, dressed in cowboy costumes, would perform a western song in the style of the Sons of the Pioneers on a Western-style stage setting.
- Cloggers – Throughout the 1980s, several champion clogging groups would frequently appear on the show, performing their clogging routines.
- Child singers – For a brief time in the late 1970s/early 1980s, child singers, mostly in the 10- to 12-year-old bracket, would occasionally appear on the show performing a popular song. Such guests included Kathy Kitchen (whom guest star Faron Young introduced), Stacy Lynn Ries, and Cheryl Handy.

Lovullo also has made the claim the show presented "what were, in reality, the first musical videos." Lovullo said his videos were conceptualized by having the show's staff go to nearby rural areas and film animals and farmers, before editing the footage to fit the storyline of a particular song. "The video material was a very workable production item for the show", he wrote. "It provided picture stories for songs. However, some of our guests felt the videos took attention away from their live performances, which they hoped would promote record sales. If they had a hit song, they didn't want to play it under comic barnyard footage." The concept's mixed reaction eventually spelled an end to the "video" concept on Hee Haw. However, several of co-host Owens' songs—including "Tall, Dark Stranger", "Big in Vegas", and "I Wouldn't Live in New York City (If They Gave Me the Whole Dang Town)"—aired on the series and have since aired on Great American Country and CMT as part of their classic country music programming blocks.

== Release ==
=== Broadcast ===
Hee Haw premiered on CBS on June 15, 1969, as a summer series. The show played to the rural roots of its humor with the producers arranging with the network to have the show segments recorded and edited in Nashville at CBS affiliate WLAC-TV (now WTVF). The network picked it up as a last-minute replacement for The Smothers Brothers Comedy Hour, a popular but controversial variety show that had been canceled amid feuds between the Smothers Brothers and the network censors over the show's topical humor.

Though Hee Haw had solid ratings overall (it sat at No. 16 for the 1970–71 season), it was dropped in July 1971 by CBS as part of the so-called "Rural Purge" that abruptly canceled all of the network's country-themed shows, including those with still-respectable ratings. The success of shows like Hee Haw was the source of a heated dispute in CBS's corporate offices: Vice President of network programming Michael Dann, although he personally disliked the shows, argued in favor of ratings (reflecting audience size), while his subordinate, Fred Silverman, head of daytime programming, held that certain demographics within total television viewership—in which Hee Haw and the others performed poorly—could draw more advertising dollars. Silverman's view won out, Dann was fired, Silverman promoted, and CBS canceled its rural shows in the summer of 1971.

=== Syndication ===
Undaunted, and noting that one instigating factor for the rural purge—the Prime Time Access Rule—had opened up an opportunity for independent syndicated productions, Hee Haw's producers put together a syndication deal for the show, which continued in roughly the same format for the rest of its run. Peppiatt and Aylesworth's company, Yongestreet Productions (named for Yonge Street, a prominent thoroughfare in their home city of Toronto), maintained ownership of the series.

At its peak, Hee Haw often competed in syndication against The Lawrence Welk Show, a long-running ABC program which had likewise been canceled in 1971, in its case in a purge of the networks' older demographic-leaning programs. Like Hee Haw, Lawrence Welk was picked up for syndication in the fall of 1971, in some markets by the same stations. The success of the two shows in syndication, and the network decisions that led to their respective cancellations, were the inspiration for a novelty song, "The Lawrence Welk-Hee Haw Counter-Revolution Polka", performed by Clark; it rose to become a top 10 hit on the Billboard Hot Country Singles chart in the fall of 1972.

Welk and Hee Haw also competed against another music-oriented niche program that moved to syndication in 1971, Soul Train. Originally a local program based in Chicago, the black-oriented program also went on to a very long run in syndication; unlike either program, Soul Train entered the market after achieving success at the local level.

In 1981, Yongestreet was acquired by Gaylord Entertainment (best known for the Grand Ole Opry and its related businesses). Mirroring the long downward trend in the popularity of variety shows in general that had taken place in the 1970s, ratings began to decline for Hee Haw around 1986. That year, Owens departed as host, leaving Clark to continue with a celebrity guest host each week. The ratings decline continued into the early 1990s. In the fall of 1991, in an attempt to win back viewers, attract a younger audience, and keep pace with sweeping changes in the country music industry of the era, the show's format and setting underwent a dramatic overhaul. The changes included a new title (The Hee Haw Show), more pop-oriented country music, and the barnyard-cornfield setting replaced by a city street and shopping mall set. The first of the new episodes aired in January 1992. The changes alienated many of the show's longtime viewers while failing to gain the hoped-for younger viewers, and the ratings continued their decline.

During the summer of 1992, a decision was made to end first-run production, and instead air highlights of the show's earlier years in a revamped program called Hee Haw Silver (as part of celebrating the show's 25th season). (Note: The show debuted as a mid-season replacement in June 1969 and because of this, its first season is considered to be those first few months on the summer schedule. Its 24th season is referred to the batch of shows that aired from January through May 1992 when it was re-titled The Hee Haw Show. The fall of 1992 marked the beginning of the program's 25th season on the air.) Under the new format, Clark hosted a mixture of classic clips and new footage.

Hee Haw Silver episodes also aired a series of retrospective looks at performers who had died since performing in highlighted content, such as David "Stringbean" Akeman, Archie Campbell, Junior Samples, and Kenny Price. According to the show's producer, Sam Lovullo, the ratings showed improvement with these classic reruns; however, the series was finally canceled in June 1993 at the conclusion of its 25th season. Hee Haw continued to pop up in reruns throughout the 1990s and later during the following decade in a series of successful DVD releases from Time Life.

=== Reruns ===
After the show's syndication run ended, reruns aired on The Nashville Network from 1993 until 1995. Upon the cancellation of reruns in 1995, the program resurfaced a year later, for another run of reruns, ultimately concluding in 1997. Its 22 years in TV syndication (1971–93) was, during its latter years, tied with Soul Train with the record for the longest-running American syndicated TV program (Soul Train continued until 2006 and, like Hee Haw, ran classic episodes its final two seasons); Hee Haw has fallen well behind several other American first-run syndicated shows since then.

During the 2006–07 season CMT aired a series of reruns and TV Land also recognized the series with an award presented by k.d. lang; in attendance were Roy Clark, Gunilla Hutton, Barbi Benton, the Hager twins, Linda Thompson, Misty Rowe, and others. It was during this point, roughly between the years of 2004 and 2007, that Time Life began selling selected episodes of the show on DVD. Among the DVD content offered was the 1978 10th anniversary special that had not been seen since its original airing. CMT sporadically aired the series, usually in graveyard slots, and primarily held the rights in order to be able to air the musical performances as part of their music video library (such as during the "Pure Vintage" block on CMT Pure Country).

Reruns of Hee Haw began airing on RFD-TV in September 2008, where it ran for 12 years, anchoring the network's Sunday night lineup, although beginning in January 2014 an episode airs on Saturday afternoon and the same episode is rerun the following Sunday night; those episodes were cut down to comply with the 44-minute minimum. In 2011, the network began re-airing the earliest episodes from 1969 to 1970 on Thursday evenings. That summer, many of the surviving cast members, along with a number of country artists who were guest stars on the show, taped a Country's Family Reunion special, entitled Salute to the Kornfield, which aired on RFD-TV in January 2012. The special is also part of Country's Family Reunion's DVD series. Concurrent with the special was the unveiling of a Hee Haw exhibit, titled Pickin' and Grinnin' , at the Oklahoma History Center in Oklahoma City.

Hee Haw left RFD-TV in 2020 and then aired on the Grand Ole Opry-operated Circle network. In May 2024, after Circle had left terrestrial television and ceased carrying the series online, RFD-TV resumed carrying Hee Haw.

As part of the promotions for its DVD products, Time-Life also compiles and syndicates a half-hour clip show series The Hee Haw Collection.

== Reception ==
=== Nielsen ratings ===
Season	Time slot (ET)	Rank	Rating
1968–69	Sunday at 9:00-10:00 pm	—N/a	—N/a
1969–70	Wednesday at 7:30-8:30 pm	20	21.0 (tied with The Glen Campbell Goodtime Hour)
1970–71	Tuesday at 8:30–9:30 pm	16	21.4

When Hee Haw went into syndication, many stations aired the program on Saturday evening in the early fringe hour, generally at 7:00pm ET / PT. But as Hee Haw was syndicated and not restrained by the scheduling of a network, stations could schedule the program at any day or time that they saw fit.

=== Legacy ===
Hee Haw continues to remain popular with its long-time fans and younger viewers who have discovered the program through DVD releases or its reruns through the years on TNN, CMT, RFD-TV, and now Circle TV. In spite of the popularity among its fans, the program has never been a favorite of television critics or reviewers; the Hee Haw Honeys spin-off, in particular, was cited in a 2002 TV Guide article as one of the 10 worst television series ever.

=== In popular culture ===
In the third-season episode of The Simpsons, "Colonel Homer", Hee Haw is parodied as the TV show Ya Hoo!.

On at least four episodes of the animated Fox series Family Guy, when the storyline hits a dead-end, a cutaway to Conway Twitty performing a song is inserted. The hand-off is done in Hee Haw style, and often uses actual footage of Twitty performing on the show.

Lulu Roman released a new album titled At Last on January 15, 2013. The album features Lulu's versions of 12 classics and standards, including guest appearances by Dolly Parton, T. Graham Brown, Linda Davis, and Georgette Jones (daughter of George Jones and Tammy Wynette).

The series was referenced in The Critic as a parody crossover with Star Trek: The Next Generation under the title of Hee Haw: The Next Generation, where the characters of the Star Trek series act out as the cast of Hee Haw.

Wonder Showzen has a segment (Horse Apples) and eventually full episode, Mathematics, which parodies Hee Haw. The latter episode featured several guest actors including David Cross, Zach Galifianakis and Heather Lawless.

== Other media ==
=== Hee Haw Honeys (spin-off series) ===
Hee Haw produced a short-lived spin-off series, Hee Haw Honeys, for the 1978–79 television season. This syndicated musical sitcom starred Kathie Lee Johnson (Gifford) along with Hee Haw regulars Misty Rowe, Gailard Sartain, Lulu Roman, and Kenny Price as a family who owned a truck stop restaurant (likely inspired by the "Lulu's Truck Stop" sketch on Hee Haw). Their restaurant included a bandstand, where guest country artists would perform a couple of their hits of the day, sometimes asking the cast to join them. Cast members would also perform songs occasionally; and the Nashville Edition, Hee Haw's backup singing group, frequently appeared on the show, portraying regular patrons of the restaurant. Notable guest stars on Honeys included, but were not limited to: Loretta Lynn, The Oak Ridge Boys, Larry Gatlin, Dave & Sugar, and the Kendalls. Some stations that carried Hee Haw would air an episode of Honeys prior to Hee Haw.

=== Hee Haw Theater ===
The Hee Haw Theater opened in Branson, Missouri in 1981 and operated through 1983. It featured live shows using the cast of the television series, as well as guests and other talent. The format was similar with a country variety show-type family theme.

=== Comic book adaptations ===
Charlton Comics also published humor comics based on Hee Haw. They were drawn by Frank Roberge.
