= Lulu Roman =

American comedian, singer and author (1946–2025)

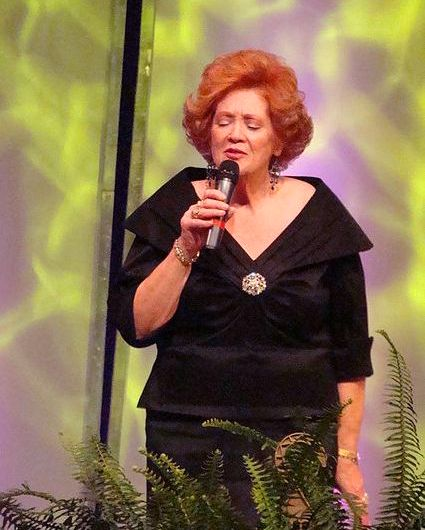
- Lulu performing in 2008

Background information
- Born: Bertha Louise Hable; May 6, 1946; Pilot Point, Texas, U.S.
- Died: April 23, 2025 (aged 78) Bellingham, Washington, U.S.
- Genres: Christian, country, Southern gospel
- Occupations: Singer; comedian; memoirist
- Label: Homesick Entertainment/Son of Jessie/Daywind

Bertha Louise "Lulu" Roman (née Hable; May 6, 1946 – April 23, 2025) was an American comedian, singer and author. She was a regular on the comedy-music show Hee Haw, which ran from 1969 to 1993.

== Background ==
Roman was born Bertha Louise Hable on May 6, 1946, in a maternity home in Pilot Point, Texas. She was afflicted with a thyroid condition from birth. She was briefly raised by family before being placed in Buckner Orphans Home. She was nicknamed "Lulu" in reference to her middle name, Louise. She attended W. W. Samuell High School in Dallas, Texas, graduating in 1964. She was bullied for her weight in school, and turned to performing as way to escape. At some point in her early years, she married and took the surname "Roman", which she kept after the marriage's annulment.

== Career ==
Following high school, Roman worked in Dallas-area nightclubs owned by Jack Ruby as "Lulu Roman, the World's Biggest Go-Go Dancer." Among her fans was country star Buck Owens, who would later recommend her to Hee Haw's producers.

During her stint on Hee Haw, she went through a bout of drug addiction, which resulted in her absence from the program for a few seasons starting in 1971. She cleaned up and converted to Christianity, after which she began singing. This led to a career as a singer of Southern gospel music; Roman recorded over a dozen albums, although she never trained as a singer. In 1985, Roman won a Dove Award.

Roman continued to perform music and stand-up comedy and also enjoyed working with Compassion International, a child-development organization. Her project Seven Times hit the number two spot on the Cash Box chart in 2010.

An album of musical standards featuring Roman doing duets with Dolly Parton, T. Graham Brown, Linda Davis, and George Jones. titled At Last and produced by Chris Barnes and Larry Ferguson was released on January 15, 2013.

Among Roman's other acting credits were the Hee Haw spinoff Hee Haw Honeys, the stock car racing film Corky, and episodes of The Love Boat and Touched by an Angel.

In 2019, Roman published her autobiography, "This Is My Story; This Is My Song."

== Personal life and death ==
Roman was reported to have been married multiple times after her first marriage, including to Gary Toman in 1975, and to Woody Smith in 1988. She had two sons, Damon and Justin. Justin, the younger of the two, died in 2017. She maintained a close personal friendship with T. Graham Brown until her death.

Roman lived with her son, Damon, at the end of her life, and died from heart failure at his home in Bellingham, Washington, on April 23, 2025, at the age of 78.
