= Gordie Tapp =

Canadian radio and television presenter and comedian (1922–2016)

- Also known as: "Gordie"
- Born: Gordon Robert Tapp; June 4, 1922; London, Ontario, Canada
- Origin: London, Ontario, Canada; Lorne Greene Academy of Radio Arts
- Died: December 18, 2016 (aged 94) Burlington, Ontario, Canada
- Genre: Country
- Occupations: Presenter, broadcaster

Gordon Robert Tapp CM OOnt (June 4, 1922 – December 18, 2016) was a Canadian entertainer, best known as a radio and television presenter, comedian and a CBS broadcaster. He was introduced to U.S. President Gerald Ford as the world's funniest storyteller.

== Career ==
Tapp studied at the Lorne Greene Academy of Radio Arts. He was the host for Main Street Jamboree, a radio program broadcast from Hamilton during the 1950s. Tapp later emceed the CBC television show Country Hoedown as well as The Performers, a series of shows featuring 'up and coming' young Canadian talent, which was recorded in major Canadian cities including Montreal, Toronto, Winnipeg, and Vancouver.

He became a performer and writer for the CBS comedy-variety television show Hee Haw. Here he became an American TV star, becoming familiar as half of the stone-faced singing duo (with Archie Campbell) performing dozens of variations on "Pfft! You Were Gone" ("Where, Oh Where Are You Tonight?"). Tapp also played various recurring characters: hayseed Cousin Clem, pompous senator Samuel B. Sternwheeler, storekeeper Mr. Gordon, and Lavern Nagger, the forever put-upon husband of Ida Lee Nagger (Roni Stoneman).

Gordie Tapp was the special guest star on episode #54 of the popular weekly variety program The Bobby Vinton Show in October 1977. The program was produced in Toronto and aired across the United States and Canada. Gordie performed a duet of "That's Amore" with Vinton.

Tapp was inducted into the Canadian Country Music Hall of Fame in 1990. He was awarded the Order of Canada in 1998 for his work in helping raise funds for organizations such as the Canadian Muscular Dystrophy campaign and Easter Seals.

In 1999, he was awarded the Order of Ontario — the highest honour in the province of Ontario.

In his later life, Tapp was the commercial spokesperson for the Ultramatic adjustable bed.

Tapp died in Burlington, Ontario on December 18, 2016, at the age of 94; no cause was given.

== Discography ==
=== Singles ===
Year	Single	CAN Country
1971	"Nobody's Singing Them Cowboy Songs No More"	10
1972	"Many Others"	44
