= Grandpa Jones =

Musical artist (1913–1998)

Background information
- Also known as: Grandpa Jones
- Born: Louis Marshall Jones; October 20, 1913; Niagara, Kentucky, U.S.
- Origin: Akron, Ohio, U.S.
- Died: February 19, 1998 (aged 84) Nashville, Tennessee, U.S.
- Genres: Country; bluegrass; gospel; old-time
- Occupations: Singer-songwriter; musician
- Instruments: Banjo; vocals; acoustic guitar
- Years active: 1932–1998
- Labels: RCA Victor; King Records; Monument
- Military career
- Allegiance: United States
- Branch: United States Army
- Service years: 1941–1945
- Conflicts: World War II

Louis Marshall Jones (October 20, 1913 – February 19, 1998), known professionally as Grandpa Jones, was an American banjo player and old time/country music singer. He was inducted as a member of the Country Music Hall of Fame in 1978.

== Biography ==
Jones was born in the small farming community of Niagara in Henderson County, Kentucky, the youngest of 10 children in a sharecropper's family. His father was an old-time fiddle player, and his mother was a ballad singer and adept on the concertina. His first instrument was guitar. Ramona Riggins, one of several women who began to gain some recognition in a musical form long dominated by men was Grandpa's wife and musical partner of over 30 years. Ramona first started playing the mandolin when she was six or seven years old.

== Career ==
Performing as Grandpa Jones, he played the guitar or banjo, yodeled, and sang mostly old-time ballads. By 1937, Jones had made his way to West Virginia, where Cousin Emmy taught Jones the art of the clawhammer style of banjo playing, which gave a rough, backwoods flavor to his performances. His first experience playing music in public came at the age of 11 or thereabouts. The music of the WLS Barn Dance in Chicago was a major influence on Louis, as were the Jimmie Rodgers records his sister brought home. In 1942, Jones joined WLW in Cincinnati, Ohio. There, he met fellow Kentuckian Merle Travis. In 1943, they made their recording debuts together for Syd Nathan's upstart King Records.

His recording career was put on hold when he enlisted in the United States Army during World War II. Discharged in 1946, he recorded again for King. Through 1946–1949, when several Opry cast members (Clyde Moody and Chubby Wise among them) and he were invited to become a part of the burgeoning world of television by Washington, DC, entrepreneur Connie B Gay, he became a cast member at the Old Dominion Barn Dance, broadcast over WRVA in Richmond, Virginia.

In the fall of 1968, Jones became a charter cast member on the long-running television show Hee Haw, often responding to the show's skits with his trademark phrase "Outrageous". He also played banjo, by himself or with banjo player David "Stringbean" Akeman. A musical segment featured in the early years had Jones and "his lovely wife Ramona" singing while ringing bells held in their hands and strapped to their ankles. A favorite skit had off-camera cast members ask, "Hey Grandpa, what's for supper?", in which he would describe a delicious, country-style meal, often in a rhyming, talking blues-style. Sometimes, he would describe something not so good; i.e. "Because you were bad, thawed out TV dinners!"

== Testimony ==
A resident of rural Ridgetop, Tennessee, outside Nashville, he was a neighbor and friend of fellow musician David "Stringbean" Akeman. On the morning of November 11, 1973, Jones discovered the bodies of Akeman and his wife, Estelle, who had been murdered during the night by robbers. Jones testified at the trial of the killers; his testimony helped to secure a conviction.

== Honors ==
In 1978, Jones was inducted into the Country Music Hall of Fame. His autobiography, Everybody's Grandpa: Fifty Years Behind the Mike, was published in 1984. In 2023, Jones was inducted into the American Banjo Museum Hall of Fame in the Historical category. In 2027, Jones was inducted into the Volunteer State Music Hall of Fame.

== Death ==
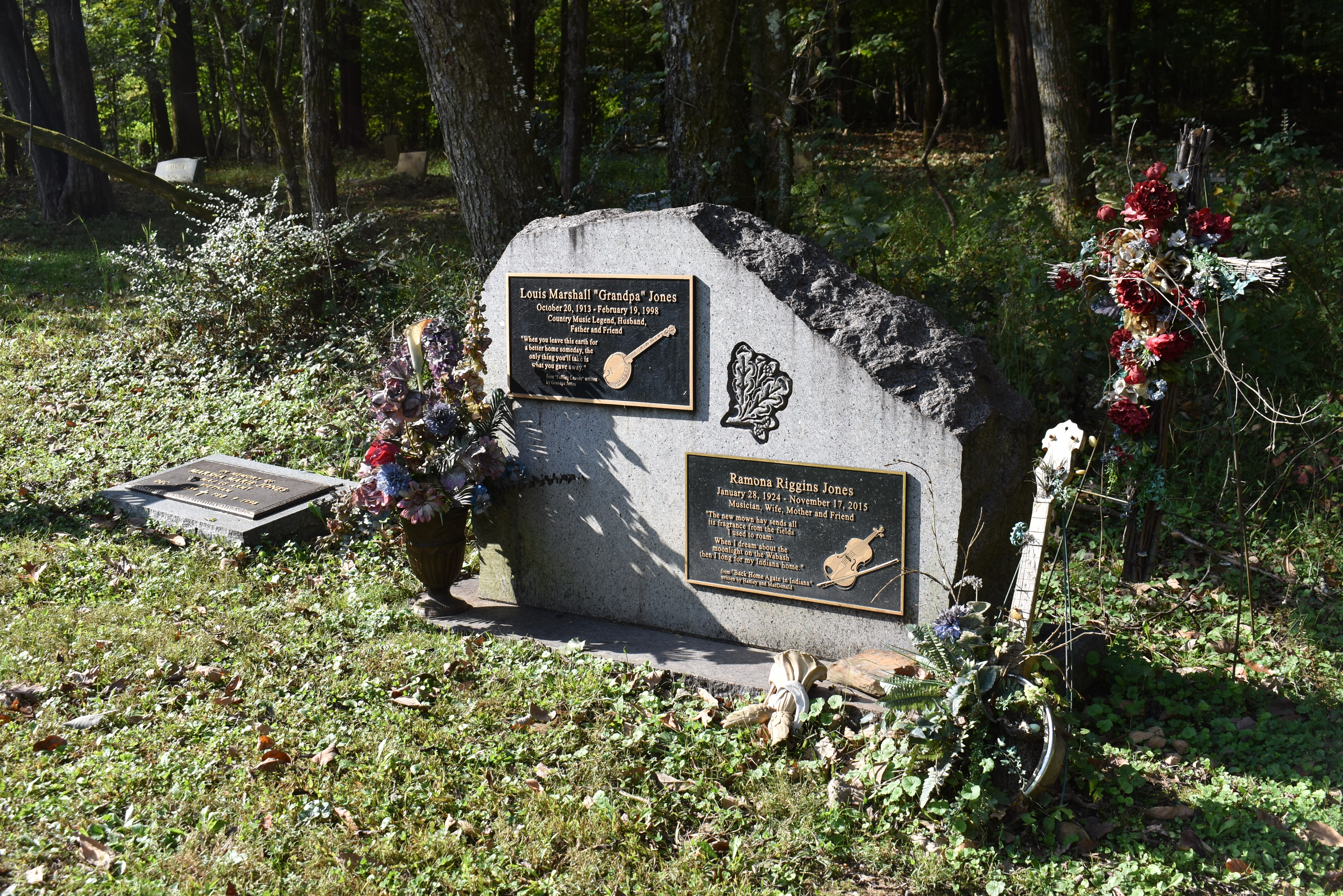
Jones's gravestone in Goodlettsville, Tennessee

In January 1998, Jones suffered two strokes after his second show performance on the Grand Ole Opry. He died at 7:00 pm Central Time on February 19, 1998, at the McKendree Village Home Health Center in Hermitage, Tennessee, at age 84. He was buried in the Luton Memorial Methodist Church cemetery in Goodlettsville, Tennessee.

== Discography ==
Jones recorded for several labels, including RCA Victor, King Records and Monument.

- Grandpa Jones Sings His Greatest Hits (1954)
- Country Music Hall of Fame Series (1992) MCA
- Grandpa Jones & The Brown's Ferry Four 16 Sacred Gospel Songs, King Records
- Grandpa Jones Yodeling Hits (1963) Monument
- Grandpa Jones Remembers the Brown's Ferry Four (1966) Monument
- Grandpa Jones Live (1970) Monument

== Other ==
- Wolfe, Charles K. (1998). "Grandpa Jones". In The Encyclopedia of Country Music. Paul Kingsbury (editor), New York: Oxford University Press. pp. 269–70.
