= 1964–65 United States network television schedule =

The following is the 1964–65 network television schedule for the three major English language commercial broadcast networks in the United States. The schedule covers primetime hours from September 1964 through August 1965. The schedule is followed by a list per network of returning series, new series, and series cancelled after the 1963–64 season.

This is the first full season in which NBC broadcast more than 50% of its schedule in color, a fact which the network emphasized during its September 19–25 premiere week.

CBS and ABC, still mostly in black and white, continued rolling out rural sitcoms; in fall 1964, the networks added Gomer Pyle, U.S.M.C. (CBS) and No Time For Sergeants (ABC) to their respective schedules. According to television historians Castleman and Podrazik (1982), critics objected to CBS's rural sitcom-heavy schedule, particularly the Gomer Pyle character, but the "high ratings earned by the silly gimmicks and simpleton heroes would assure rural sitcoms spots in the network schedules for years".

Castleman and Podrazik also point out the large number of "escapist" programs which debuted during the fall of 1964: Gilligan's Island (CBS), Bewitched (ABC), My Living Doll (CBS), The Addams Family (ABC) and The Munsters (CBS). Only NBC avoided the escapist trend during the season, with the exception of The Man From U.N.C.L.E..

All times are Eastern and Pacific. Premieres are highlighted in bold.

Each of the 30 highest-rated shows is listed with its rank and rating as determined by Nielsen Media Research.

Yellow indicates the programs in the top 10 for the season.
Cyan indicates the programs in the top 20 for the season.
Magenta indicates the programs in the top 30 for the season.

== Sunday ==
Network		7:00 PM	7:30 PM	8:00 PM	8:30 PM	9:00 PM	9:30 PM	10:00 PM	10:30 PM
ABC		Local	Wagon Train		**Broadside**	**The ABC Sunday Night Movie** (Periodically in COLOR)			
CBS	Fall	Lassie (17/25.1)	My Favorite Martian (24/23.7)	The Ed Sullivan Show (15/25.2) (Tied with Petticoat Junction)		**My Living Doll**	The Joey Bishop Show	Candid Camera	What's My Line?
CBS	Winter	Lassie (17/25.1)	My Favorite Martian (24/23.7)	The Ed Sullivan Show (15/25.2) (Tied with Petticoat Junction)		**For the People**		Candid Camera	What's My Line?
CBS	Summer	Lassie (17/25.1)	My Favorite Martian (24/23.7)	The Ed Sullivan Show (15/25.2) (Tied with Petticoat Junction)		The Twilight Zone (repeats)		Candid Camera	What's My Line?
NBC	Fall	**Profiles in Courage** (began at 6:30)	Walt Disney's Wonderful World of Color (11/25.7) (In COLOR)		The Bill Dana Show	Bonanza (1/36.3) (In COLOR)		**The Rogues**	
NBC	Winter	**Profiles in Courage** (began at 6:30)	Walt Disney's Wonderful World of Color (11/25.7) (In COLOR)		**Branded** (14/25.3)	Bonanza (1/36.3) (In COLOR)		**The Rogues**	
NBC	Summer	**Profiles in Courage** (began at 6:30)	Walt Disney's Wonderful World of Color (11/25.7) (In COLOR)		Buckskin (repeats)	Bonanza (1/36.3) (In COLOR)		**The Rogues**	

Notes: Mister Ed aired on CBS from 6:30 to 7:00 p.m. until January 1965, when World War One took over the time period.

On NBC, some episodes of Branded aired in color. Buckskin, which aired on NBC in July and August 1965, consisted of reruns of the 1958–1959 series.

On CBS, Bill & Martha was originally supposed to have aired 9:30 p.m., but it was replaced by The Joey Bishop Show before it ever began.

== Monday ==
Network		7:30 PM	8:00 PM	8:30 PM	9:00 PM	9:30 PM	10:00 PM	10:30 PM
ABC	Fall	**Voyage to the Bottom of the Sea**		**No Time for Sergeants**	**Wendy and Me**	**The Bing Crosby Show**	Ben Casey	
ABC	Summer	**Voyage to the Bottom of the Sea**		**No Time for Sergeants**	**Wendy and Me**	The Farmer's Daughter	Ben Casey	
CBS	Fall	To Tell the Truth	I've Got a Secret (26/23.0)	The Andy Griffith Show (4/28.3)	The Lucy Show (8/26.6)	**Many Happy Returns**	**Slattery's People**	
CBS	Winter	To Tell the Truth	I've Got a Secret (26/23.0)	The Andy Griffith Show (4/28.3)	The Lucy Show (8/26.6)	**Many Happy Returns**	CBS Reports / CBS News Specials	
CBS	Spring	To Tell the Truth	I've Got a Secret (26/23.0)	The Andy Griffith Show (4/28.3)	The Lucy Show (8/26.6)	The Danny Thomas Show	CBS Reports / CBS News Specials	
CBS	Summer	To Tell the Truth	I've Got a Secret (26/23.0)	Summer Playhouse	Glynis (repeats)	The Danny Thomas Show	CBS Reports / CBS News Specials	
NBC	Fall	**90 Bristol Court** (consisting of 3 half-hour sitcoms): **Karen** (7:30-8:00) / **Harris Against the World** (8:00-8:30) / **Tom, Dick, and Mary** (8:30-9:00)			The Andy Williams Show (In COLOR) / The Jonathan Winters Show		The Alfred Hitchcock Hour	
NBC	Winter	**Karen**	**The Man From U.N.C.L.E.**		The Andy Williams Show (In COLOR) / The Jonathan Winters Show		The Alfred Hitchcock Hour	

NOTES: On CBS, Summer Playhouse was an anthology series made up of a combination of unsold television pilots and reruns of episodes of other anthology series.

== Tuesday ==
Network		7:30 PM	8:00 PM	8:30 PM	9:00 PM	9:30 PM	10:00 PM	10:30 PM
ABC		Combat! (10/26.1)		McHale's Navy (29/22.3)	**The Tycoon**	**Peyton Place** (20/24.6)	The Fugitive (5/27.9)	
CBS	Fall	Local	**World War One**	The Red Skelton Hour (6/27.4)		Petticoat Junction (15/25.2) (Tied with The Ed Sullivan Show)	The Doctors and the Nurses	
CBS	Winter	Local	The Joey Bishop Show	The Red Skelton Hour (6/27.4)		Petticoat Junction (15/25.2) (Tied with The Ed Sullivan Show)	The Doctors and the Nurses	
CBS	Summer	Local	The Joey Bishop Show	Hollywood Talent Scouts		Petticoat Junction (15/25.2) (Tied with The Ed Sullivan Show)	The Doctors and the Nurses	
NBC	Fall	Mr. Novak		**The Man from U.N.C.L.E.**		That Was The Week That Was (In COLOR)	The Bell Telephone Hour (In COLOR)	
NBC	Winter	Mr. Novak		**Hullabaloo** (In COLOR)		That Was The Week That Was (In COLOR)	The Bell Telephone Hour (In COLOR)	
NBC	Summer	Mr. Novak		**Moment of Fear**	**Cloak of Mystery**		**Hullabaloo** (In COLOR)	

== Wednesday ==
Network		7:30 PM	8:00 PM	8:30 PM	9:00 PM	9:30 PM	10:00 PM	10:30 PM
ABC	Fall	The Adventures of Ozzie and Harriet	The Patty Duke Show (28/22.4)	**Shindig!**	**Mickey**	Burke's Law		**ABC Scope**
ABC	Winter	The Adventures of Ozzie and Harriet	The Patty Duke Show (28/22.4)	**Shindig!**		Burke's Law		**ABC Scope**
CBS	Fall	CBS Reports / CBS News Specials		The Beverly Hillbillies (12/25.6)	The Dick Van Dyke Show (7/27.1)	**The Cara Williams Show**	The Danny Kaye Show	
CBS	Follow-up	Mister Ed	**My Living Doll**	The Beverly Hillbillies (12/25.6)	The Dick Van Dyke Show (7/27.1)	**The Cara Williams Show**	The Danny Kaye Show	
CBS	Summer	Mister Ed	**My Living Doll**	The Beverly Hillbillies (12/25.6)	The Dick Van Dyke Show (7/27.1)	**Our Private World**	The Lucy-Desi Comedy Hour (repeats)	
NBC		The Virginian (22/24.0) (In COLOR)			**NBC Wednesday Night at the Movies** (Sporadically in COLOR)			

== Thursday ==
Network		7:30 PM	8:00 PM	8:30 PM	9:00 PM	9:30 PM	10:00 PM	10:30 PM
ABC	Fall	The Flintstones (In COLOR)	The Donna Reed Show	My Three Sons (13/25.5)	**Bewitched** (2/31.0)	**Peyton Place** (9/26.4)	The Jimmy Dean Show	
ABC	December	**Jonny Quest** (In COLOR)	The Donna Reed Show	My Three Sons (13/25.5)	**Bewitched** (2/31.0)	**Peyton Place** (9/26.4)	The Jimmy Dean Show	
CBS	Fall	**The Munsters** (18/24.7) (Tied with Gilligan's Island)	Perry Mason		Password	**The Baileys of Balboa**	The Defenders	
CBS	Summer	**The Munsters** (18/24.7) (Tied with Gilligan's Island)	Perry Mason		Password	**The Celebrity Game**	The Defenders	
NBC		**Daniel Boone**		Dr. Kildare		Hazel (In COLOR)	Kraft Suspense Theatre (In COLOR) / Perry Como's Kraft Music Hall (once a month)	

== Friday ==
Network		7:30 PM	8:00 PM	8:30 PM	9:00 PM	9:30 PM	10:00 PM	10:30 PM
ABC	Fall	**Jonny Quest** (In COLOR)	The Farmer's Daughter	**The Addams Family** (23/23.9)	**Valentine's Day**	**12 O'Clock High**		Local
ABC	December	The Flintstones (In COLOR)	The Farmer's Daughter	**The Addams Family** (23/23.9)	**Valentine's Day**	**12 O'Clock High**		Local
ABC	Winter	The Flintstones (In COLOR)	The Farmer's Daughter	**The Addams Family** (23/23.9)	**Valentine's Day**	**F.D.R.**	**12 O'Clock High**	
ABC	Summer	The Flintstones (In COLOR)	**F.D.R.**	**The Addams Family** (23/23.9)	**Valentine's Day**	**Peyton Place**	**12 O'Clock High**	
CBS	Fall	Rawhide		**The Entertainers**		**Gomer Pyle, U.S.M.C.** (3/30.7)	**The Reporter**	
CBS	Winter	Rawhide		On Broadway Tonight		**Gomer Pyle, U.S.M.C.** (3/30.7)	**Slattery's People**	
CBS	Spring	Rawhide		The Great Adventure (repeats)		**Gomer Pyle, U.S.M.C.** (3/30.7)	**Slattery's People**	
CBS	Summer	Rawhide		**The Cara Williams Show**	**Our Private World**	Vacation Playhouse	**Slattery's People**	
NBC		International Showtime		Bob Hope Presents the Chrysler Theatre (In COLOR) / Chrysler Presents a Bob Hope Special (once monthly; most Bob Hope specials were in black-and-white)		The Jack Benny Program	The Jack Paar Program (In COLOR)	

Note: On CBS, Vacation Playhouse was an anthology series made up entirely of unsold television pilots.

== Saturday ==
Network		7:30 PM	8:00 PM	8:30 PM	9:00 PM	9:30 PM	10:00 PM	10:30 PM
ABC	Fall	The Outer Limits		The Lawrence Welk Show (30/22.0)		The Hollywood Palace		Local
ABC	Winter	**The King Family Show**		The Lawrence Welk Show (30/22.0)		The Hollywood Palace		Local
CBS	Fall	The Jackie Gleason Show (21/24.4)		**Gilligan's Island** (18/24.7) (Tied with The Munsters)	**Mr. Broadway**		Gunsmoke (27/22.6)	
CBS	Winter	The Jackie Gleason Show (21/24.4)		**Gilligan's Island** (18/24.7) (Tied with The Munsters)	**The Entertainers**		Gunsmoke (27/22.6)	
CBS	Spring	The Jackie Gleason Show (21/24.4)		**Gilligan's Island** (18/24.7) (Tied with The Munsters)	**Secret Agent**		Gunsmoke (27/22.6)	
CBS	Summer	**Fanfare**		**Gilligan's Island** (18/24.7) (Tied with The Munsters)	**Secret Agent**		Gunsmoke (27/22.6)	
NBC	Fall	**Flipper** (25/23.4) (In COLOR)	**The Famous Adventures of Mr. Magoo** (In COLOR)	**Kentucky Jones**	NBC Saturday Night at the Movies (In COLOR)			
NBC	Winter	**Flipper** (25/23.4) (In COLOR)	**Kentucky Jones**	**The Famous Adventures of Mr. Magoo** (In COLOR)	NBC Saturday Night at the Movies (In COLOR)			

== By network ==
=== ABC ===
**Returning Series**

- The Adventures of Ozzie and Harriet
- The Avengers
- Ben Casey
- Burke's Law
- Combat!
- The Donna Reed Show
- The Farmer's Daughter
- The Flintstones
- The Fugitive
- The Hollywood Palace
- The Jimmy Dean Show
- The Lawrence Welk Show
- McHale's Navy
- My Three Sons
- The Outer Limits
- The Patty Duke Show
- Saga of Western Man
- Wagon Train

**New Series**

- **12 O'Clock High**
- **ABC Scope**
- **The ABC Sunday Night Movie**
- **The Addams Family**
- **Bewitched**
- **The Bing Crosby Show**
- **Broadside**
- **F.D.R.** *
- **Jonny Quest**
- **The King Family Show** *
- **Mickey**
- **No Time for Sergeants**
- **Peyton Place**
- **Shindig!**
- **The Tycoon**
- **Valentine's Day**
- **Voyage to the Bottom of the Sea**
- **Wendy and Me**

Not returning from 1963–64:

- 77 Sunset Strip
- 100 Grand
- ABC News Reports
- Arrest and Trial
- Breaking Point
- Channing
- Destry
- The Edie Adams Show
- Ensign O'Toole
- The Fight of the Week
- The Greatest Show on Earth
- Hootenanny
- The Jerry Lewis Show
- Laughs For Sale
- Make That Spare
- The Price is Right
- The Sid Caesar Show
- The Travels of Jaimie McPheeters

=== CBS ===
**Returning Series**

- The Andy Griffith Show
- The Beverly Hillbillies
- Candid Camera
- CBS News Hour
- CBS News Specials
- The Danny Kaye Show
- The Danny Thomas Show
- The Defenders
- The Dick Van Dyke Show
- The Doctors and the Nurses
- The Ed Sullivan Show
- Glynis
- Gunsmoke
- Hollywood Talent Scouts
- I've Got a Secret
- The Jackie Gleason Show
- The Joey Bishop Show (moved from NBC)
- Lassie
- The Lucy Show
- The Lucy-Desi Comedy Hour
- Mister Ed
- My Favorite Martian
- On Broadway Tonight
- Password
- Perry Mason
- Petticoat Junction
- Rawhide
- The Red Skelton Hour
- Secret Agent
- Slattery's People
- Summer Playhouse
- To Tell the Truth
- The Twentieth Century
- Vacation Playhouse
- What's My Line?

**New Series**

- **The Baileys of Balboa**
- **The Cara Williams Show**
- **The Celebrity Game**
- **The Entertainers**
- **Fanfare** *
- **For the People** *
- **Gilligan's Island**
- **Gomer Pyle, U.S.M.C.**
- **Many Happy Returns**
- **Mr. Broadway**
- **The Munsters**
- **My Living Doll**
- **Our Private World** *
- **The Reporter**
- **World War One**

Not returning from 1963–64:

- Brenner
- East Side/West Side
- The Great Adventure
- High Adventure with Lowell Thomas
- The Jack Benny Program (moved to NBC)
- The Judy Garland Show
- Made in America
- The New Phil Silvers Show
- Route 66
- Suspense
- Tell It to the Camera
- The Twilight Zone

=== NBC ===
**Returning Series**

- The Alfred Hitchcock Hour (moved from CBS)
- The Andy Williams Show
- The Bell Telephone Hour
- The Bill Dana Show
- Bob Hope Presents the Chrysler Theatre
- Bonanza
- Buckskin
- Chrysler Presents a Bob Hope Special
- Dr. Kildare
- Hazel
- International Showtime
- The Jack Benny Program (moved from CBS)
- The Jack Paar Program
- The Jonathan Winters Show
- Kraft Suspense Theatre
- Mr. Novak
- NBC Saturday Night at the Movies
- Perry Como's Kraft Music Hall
- That Was the Week That Was
- The Virginian
- Walt Disney's Wonderful World of Color

**New Series**

- **90 Bristol Court**
- **Branded** *
- **Cloak of Mystery** *
- **Daniel Boone**
- **The Famous Adventures of Mr. Magoo**
- **Flipper**
- **Harris Against the World**
- **Hullabaloo** *
- **Karen**
- **Kentucky Jones**
- **The Man from U.N.C.L.E.**
- **Moment of Fear**
- **NBC Wednesday Night at the Movies**
- **Profiles in Courage**
- **The Rogues**
- **Tom, Dick, and Mary**

Not returning from 1963–64:

- The DuPont Show of the Week
- The Eleventh Hour
- Espionage
- Ford Presents the New Christy Minstrels
- Grindl
- Harry's Girls
- Hollywood and the Stars
- The Lieutenant
- The Joey Bishop Show (moved to CBS)
- On Parade
- Redigo
- The Richard Boone Show
- Sing Along with Mitch
- Temple Houston
- You Don't Say!

Note: The * indicates that the program was introduced in midseason.
