= 1963–64 United States network television schedule =

The following is the 1963–64 network television schedule for the three major English language commercial broadcast networks in the United States. The schedule covers primetime hours from September 1963 through August 1964. The schedule is followed by a list per network of returning series, new series, and series cancelled after the 1962–63 season.

ABC began its new fall schedule a week early, beating CBS and NBC out of the starting gate. New series debuting this week included sci-fi anthology The Outer Limits, police/lawyer series Arrest and Trial, drama The Fugitive, and game show 100 Grand. ABC also completely revamped its Friday night schedule, with two new series: detective show Burke's Law, sitcom The Farmer's Daughter, and returning boxing program The Fight of the Week. Fight would mark the end of boxing on network television. Weekly boxing telecasts had debuted on network TV in 1940 and had enjoyed a run on all networks at various times, but after September 11, 1964, weekly primetime boxing series would disappear entirely from network television. ABC introduced two variety hours that fall with The Jimmy Dean Show and the short lived The Jerry Lewis Show.

CBS's success with rural comedies The Andy Griffith Show and The Beverly Hillbillies convinced the network that rural sitcoms would continue to be popular. As a result, CBS president James Aubrey added what critics described as an "endless procession of country clones [of] the wildly successful Beverly Hillbillies" to the network's schedule. Petticoat Junction, from the same producers of Hillbillies, debuted on September 24. The strategy worked: CBS had 14 of the top 15 primetime programs, a feat Variety later compared to Joe DiMaggio's 56-game hitting streak. CBS also brought two show business veterans to weekly variety television that year with The Judy Garland Show and The Danny Kaye Show.

Westerns continued to be popular on television, and all three networks scheduled several Western series. NBC, in particular, retained a number of Westerns on its fall 1963 schedule: two returning series The Virginian and Bonanza, and new series Temple Houston, and Redigo. NBC's Western-heavy schedule would pay off, as Bonanza again became the second highest-rated TV series in the Nielsen ratings that year; The Virginian reached #17. CBS's Gunsmoke reached #20. However, some Westerns from the previous season were cancelled, some examples are Laramie and Empire, which due to low ratings.

On July 17, 1963, NBC removed The Robert Taylor Show from the lineup due to conflicts between the producers and the U.S. Department of Health, Education and Welfare.

All times are Eastern and Pacific. New fall series are highlighted in bold.

Each of the 30 highest-rated shows is listed with its rank and rating as determined by Nielsen Media Research.

Two landmark events occurred during this network TV season. The first was the JFK assassination, which took place on Friday, November 22, 1963. All programming that was originally scheduled to air in prime time on that weekend had to be pushed back to the following weekend due to all three networks broadcasting news coverage that would last until November 26. Regular programming was resumed on November 27.

The second event was the live American debut of The Beatles on The Ed Sullivan Show on February 9, 1964. An estimated 73 million people tuned in to watch the Fab Four perform on the program, which made it one of the highest rated TV episodes in the history of prime-time television.

Yellow indicates the top 10 programs for the season.
Cyan indicates the top 20 programs for the season.
Magenta indicates the top 30 programs for the season.

== Sunday ==
Network		7:00 PM	7:30 PM	8:00 PM	8:30 PM	9:00 PM	9:30 PM	10:00 PM	10:30 PM
ABC	Fall	Local	**The Travels of Jaimie McPheeters**		**Arrest and Trial**			**100 Grand**	ABC News Reports
ABC	October	Local	**The Travels of Jaimie McPheeters**		**Arrest and Trial**			**Laughs For Sale**	ABC News Reports
ABC	Winter	Local	**The Travels of Jaimie McPheeters**		**Arrest and Trial**			Local	
ABC	Spring	Local	Empire (In COLOR) (R)		**Arrest and Trial**			Local	
CBS	Fall	Lassie (12/25.0) (Tied with I've Got a Secret and The Jack Benny Show)	**My Favorite Martian** (10/26.3)	The Ed Sullivan Show (8/27.5)		**The Judy Garland Show**		Candid Camera (7/27.7)	What's My Line? (24/22.6) (Tied with To Tell the Truth)
CBS	Spring	Lassie (12/25.0) (Tied with I've Got a Secret and The Jack Benny Show)	**My Favorite Martian** (10/26.3)	The Ed Sullivan Show (8/27.5)		**The Celebrity Game**	**Made in America**	Candid Camera (7/27.7)	What's My Line? (24/22.6) (Tied with To Tell the Truth)
CBS	Summer	Lassie (12/25.0) (Tied with I've Got a Secret and The Jack Benny Show)	**My Favorite Martian** (10/26.3)	The Ed Sullivan Show (8/27.5)		**The Celebrity Game**	Brenner	Candid Camera (7/27.7)	What's My Line? (24/22.6) (Tied with To Tell the Truth)
NBC		**The Bill Dana Show**	Walt Disney's Wonderful World of Color (21/23.0) (In COLOR)		**Grindl**	Bonanza (2/36.9) (In COLOR)		The DuPont Show of the Week	

Notes: Mister Ed aired on CBS from 6:30 to 7 p.m. 100 Grand only lasted three weeks, and was replaced by Laughs For Sale, which ran until December 1963. In April 1964, The Celebrity Game was added to CBS' primetime lineup. Empire on ABC consisted of reruns of the 1962-63 NBC TV series. Brenner on CBS consisted of ten new episodes — the first produced for the show since 1959 — followed by reruns of episodes first aired in 1959 and 1961.

== Monday ==
Network		7:30 PM	8:00 PM	8:30 PM	9:00 PM	9:30 PM	10:00 PM	10:30 PM
ABC		**The Outer Limits**		Wagon Train (In COLOR)			**Breaking Point**	
CBS	Fall	To Tell the Truth (24/22.6) (Tied with What's My Line?)	I've Got a Secret (12/25.0) (Tied with Lassie and The Jack Benny Show)	The Lucy Show (6/28.1)	The Danny Thomas Show (9/26.7)	The Andy Griffith Show (5/29.4)	**East Side/West Side**	
CBS	Summer	To Tell the Truth (24/22.6) (Tied with What's My Line?)	I've Got a Secret (12/25.0) (Tied with Lassie and The Jack Benny Show)	Vacation Playhouse	The Danny Thomas Show (9/26.7)	The Andy Griffith Show (5/29.4)	**East Side/West Side**	
NBC		NBC Monday Night at the Movies (most in COLOR)				**Hollywood and the Stars**	Sing Along with Mitch (In COLOR)	

Notes: Beginning in September, CBS Evening News with Walter Cronkite (formerly Walter Cronkite with the News) and The Huntley-Brinkley Report expanded to a half-hour, airing weekdays at 6:30 p.m.

On CBS, Vacation Playhouse was an anthology series made up of unsold television pilots.

== Tuesday ==
Network		7:30 PM	8:00 PM	8:30 PM	9:00 PM	9:30 PM	10:00 PM	10:30 PM
ABC		Combat!		McHale's Navy (22/22.8) (Tied with Hazel)	**The Greatest Show on Earth** (In COLOR)		**The Fugitive** (28/21.7)	
CBS	Fall	Marshal Dillon (Gunsmoke repeats)		The Red Skelton Show (11/25.7)		**Petticoat Junction** (4/30.3)	The Jack Benny Show (12/25.0) (Tied with I've Got a Secret and Lassie)	The Garry Moore Show
CBS	Summer	Marshal Dillon (Gunsmoke repeats)		High Adventure with Lowell Thomas		**Petticoat Junction** (4/30.3)	The Jack Benny Show (12/25.0) (Tied with I've Got a Secret and Lassie)	The Garry Moore Show
NBC	Fall	**Mr. Novak**		**Redigo**	**The Richard Boone Show**		The Bell Telephone Hour / The Andy Williams Show (In COLOR)	
NBC	Winter	**Mr. Novak**		**You Don't Say!** (In COLOR)	**The Richard Boone Show**		The Bell Telephone Hour / The Andy Williams Show (In COLOR)	

Note: The 1964 CBS summer series High Adventure with Lowell Thomas consisted of reruns of specials which had aired under that title during the late 1950s. In January 1964, Redigo was cancelled and replaced with You Don't Say!.

== Wednesday ==
Network		7:30 PM	8:00 PM	8:30 PM	9:00 PM	9:30 PM	10:00 PM	10:30 PM
ABC	Fall	The Adventures of Ozzie and Harriet (29/21.6)	**The Patty Duke Show** (18/23.9)	The Price Is Right	Ben Casey		**Channing**	
ABC	Follow-up	The Adventures of Ozzie and Harriet (29/21.6)	**The Patty Duke Show** (18/23.9)	**The Farmer's Daughter**	Ben Casey		**Channing**	
CBS	Fall	**Chronicle** / CBS Reports		**Glynis**	The Beverly Hillbillies (1/39.1)	The Dick Van Dyke Show (3/33.3)	**The Danny Kaye Show** (30/21.5) (Tied with Bob Hope Presents the Chrysler Theatre)	
CBS	Winter	**Chronicle** / CBS Reports		**Tell It to the Camera**	The Beverly Hillbillies (1/39.1)	The Dick Van Dyke Show (3/33.3)	**The Danny Kaye Show** (30/21.5) (Tied with Bob Hope Presents the Chrysler Theatre)	
CBS	Summer	**Chronicle** / CBS Reports		Suspense	The Beverly Hillbillies (1/39.1)	The Dick Van Dyke Show (3/33.3)	**On Broadway Tonight**	
NBC		The Virginian (17/24.0) (In COLOR)			**Espionage**		The Eleventh Hour	

== Thursday ==
Network		7:30 PM	8:00 PM	8:30 PM	9:00 PM	9:30 PM	10:00 PM	10:30 PM
ABC	Fall	The Flintstones (In COLOR)	The Donna Reed Show (16/24.5)	My Three Sons (27/21.9)	**The Jimmy Dean Show**		**The Edie Adams Show** / **The Sid Caesar Show**	Local
ABC	Winter	The Flintstones (In COLOR)	The Donna Reed Show (16/24.5)	My Three Sons (27/21.9)	**The Jimmy Dean Show**		**The Edie Adams Show** / **The Sid Caesar Show**	ABC News Reports
ABC	Spring	The Flintstones (In COLOR)	The Donna Reed Show (16/24.5)	My Three Sons (27/21.9)	Ensign O'Toole	**The Jimmy Dean Show**		ABC News Reports
CBS		Password	Rawhide		Perry Mason (26/22.1)		The Nurses	
NBC	Fall	**Temple Houston**		Dr. Kildare (19/23.6)		Hazel (22/22.8) (Tied with McHale's Navy) (In COLOR)	**Kraft Suspense Theatre** (In COLOR) / Perry Como's Kraft Music Hall (once a month) (In COLOR)	
NBC	Summer	**Temple Houston**		Dr. Kildare (19/23.6)		**Ford Presents the New Christy Minstrels** (In COLOR)	**Kraft Suspense Theatre** (In COLOR) / Perry Como's Kraft Music Hall (once a month) (In COLOR)	

Note: Ensign O'Toole on ABC consisted of reruns of the 1962-1963 NBC situation comedy. On NBC, The Robert Taylor Show was supposed to air at 7:30-8:30, but it was never aired and Temple Houston replaced it on the schedule at the last minute.

== Friday ==
Network		7:30 PM	8:00 PM	8:30 PM	9:00 PM	9:30 PM	10:00 PM	10:30 PM
ABC	Fall	77 Sunset Strip		**Burke's Law**		**The Farmer's Daughter**	The Fight of the Week (10:00) / Make That Spare (10:45)	
ABC	Follow-up	77 Sunset Strip		**Burke's Law**		The Price is Right	The Fight of the Week (10:00) / Make That Spare (10:45)	
ABC	Winter	**Destry**		**Burke's Law**		The Price is Right	The Fight of the Week (10:00) / Make That Spare (10:45)	
CBS		**The Great Adventure**		Route 66		Twilight Zone	The Alfred Hitchcock Hour	
NBC	Fall	International Showtime		**Bob Hope Presents the Chrysler Theatre** (30/21.5) (Tied with The Danny Kaye Show) (Dramatic episodes in COLOR; the monthly Bob Hope variety specials were in black-and-white)		**Harry's Girls**	The Jack Paar Program (In COLOR)	
NBC	Winter	International Showtime		**Bob Hope Presents the Chrysler Theatre** (30/21.5) (Tied with The Danny Kaye Show) (Dramatic episodes in COLOR; the monthly Bob Hope variety specials were in black-and-white)		**That Was the Week That Was** (In COLOR)	The Jack Paar Program (In COLOR)	
NBC	Summer	International Showtime		**Bob Hope Presents the Chrysler Theatre** (30/21.5) (Tied with The Danny Kaye Show) (Dramatic episodes in COLOR; the monthly Bob Hope variety specials were in black-and-white)		**On Parade**	The Jack Paar Program (In COLOR)	

Note: 77 Sunset Strip on ABC ended February 7, 1964, replaced the next week by Destry. On December 6, 1963, The Farmer's Daughter moved to another day and timeslot and The Price Is Right replaced it.

== Saturday ==
Network		7:30 PM	8:00 PM	8:30 PM	9:00 PM	9:30 PM	10:00 PM	10:30 PM
ABC	Fall	Hootenanny		The Lawrence Welk Show		**The Jerry Lewis Show** (continued until 11:30)		
ABC	January	Hootenanny		The Lawrence Welk Show		**The Hollywood Palace**		Local
CBS	Fall	The Jackie Gleason Show (15/24.6)		**The New Phil Silvers Show**	The Defenders		Gunsmoke (20/23.5)	
CBS	December	The Jackie Gleason Show (15/24.6)		The Defenders		**The New Phil Silvers Show**	Gunsmoke (20/23.5)	
CBS	Summer	The Lucy-Desi Comedy Hour (repeats)		The Defenders		**Summer Playhouse**	Gunsmoke (20/23.5)	
NBC		**The Lieutenant**		The Joey Bishop Show (In COLOR)	NBC Saturday Night at the Movies (In COLOR)			

Notes: ABC-TV Presents: The Hollywood Palace debuted on January 4, 1964, replacing The Jerry Lewis Show.

On CBS, Summer Playhouse was an anthology series consisting of a combination of unsold television pilots and reruns of episodes of other anthology series.

== By network ==
=== ABC ===
**Returning Series**

- 77 Sunset Strip
- ABC News Reports
- The Adventures of Ozzie and Harriet
- The Avengers
- Ben Casey
- Combat!
- The Donna Reed Show
- The Fight of the Week
- Hootenanny
- The Lawrence Welk Show
- Make That Spare
- McHale's Navy
- My Three Sons
- The Price is Right
- Wagon Train

**New Series**

- **100 Grand**
- **Arrest and Trial**
- **Breaking Point**
- **Burke's Law**
- **Channing**
- **Destry** *
- **The Edie Adams Show**
- **The Farmer's Daughter**
- **The Fugitive**
- **The Greatest Show on Earth**
- **The Hollywood Palace** *
- **The Jerry Lewis Show**
- **The Jimmy Dean Show**
- **Laughs For Sale**
- **The Outer Limits**
- **The Patty Duke Show**
- **Saga of Western Man**
- **The Sid Caesar Show**
- **The Travels of Jaimie McPheeters**

Not returning from 1962–63:

- Alcoa Premiere
- Beany and Cecil
- Bell and Howell Closeup
- Cheyenne
- The Dakotas
- The Gallant Men
- Going My Way
- Hawaiian Eye
- Hollywood Special
- Howard K. Smith: News and Comment
- I'm Dickens, He's Fenster
- The Jetsons
- Leave It to Beaver
- Mr. Smith Goes to Washington
- Naked City
- Our Man Higgins
- The Rifleman
- The Roy Rogers and Dale Evans Show
- Stoney Burke
- The Untouchables
- The Valiant Years

=== CBS ===
**Returning Series**

- The Alfred Hitchcock Hour
- The Andy Griffith Show
- The Beverly Hillbillies
- Brenner
- Candid Camera
- CBS Reports
- The Danny Thomas Show
- The Defenders
- The Dick Van Dyke Show
- The Ed Sullivan Show
- The Garry Moore Show
- Gunsmoke
- High Adventure with Lowell Thomas
- I've Got a Secret
- The Jack Benny Show
- The Jackie Gleason Show
- Lassie
- The Lucy Show
- Mister Ed
- The Nurses
- Password
- Perry Mason
- Rawhide
- Route 66
- Suspense
- To Tell the Truth
- The Twentieth Century
- Twilight Zone
- Vacation Playhouse
- What's My Line

**New Series**

- **Chronicle** *
- **The Danny Kaye Show**
- **East Side/West Side**
- **Glynis**
- **The Great Adventure**
- **The Judy Garland Show**
- **Made in America** *
- **My Favorite Martian**
- **The New Phil Silvers Show**
- **On Broadway Tonight** *
- **Petticoat Junction**
- **Slattery's People**
- **Summer Playhouse** *
- **Tell It to the Camera** *

Not returning from 1962–63:

- Dennis the Menace
- Eyewitness
- Fair Exchange
- Have Gun - Will Travel
- GE True
- The Keefe Brasselle Show
- The Lloyd Bridges Show
- The Many Loves of Dobie Gillis
- The New Loretta Young Show
- The Real McCoys
- Stump the Stars
- The United States Steel Hour
- Walter Cronkite with the News

=== NBC ===
**Returning Series**

- The Alfred Hitchcock Hour (moved from CBS)
- The Andy Williams Show
- The Bell Telephone Hour
- Bonanza
- Dr. Kildare
- The DuPont Show of the Week
- The Eleventh Hour
- Hazel
- International Showtime
- The Jack Paar Program
- The Joey Bishop Show
- Perry Como's Kraft Music Hall
- Sing Along with Mitch
- NBC Monday Night at the Movies
- NBC Saturday Night at the Movies
- The Virginian
- Walt Disney's Wonderful World of Color

**New Series**

- **Bob Hope Presents the Chrysler Theatre**
- **Chrysler Presents a Bob Hope Special** *
- **Espionage**
- **Grindl**
- **Harry's Girls**
- **Hollywood and the Stars**
- **Kraft Suspense Theatre**
- **Mr. Novak**
- **On Parade** *
- **Redigo** **
- **The Richard Boone Show**
- **Temple Houston**
- **That Was the Week That Was** *
- **You Don't Say!** *

Not returning from 1962–63:

- Car 54, Where Are You?
- Chet Huntley Reporting
- David Brinkley's Journal
- The Dick Powell Show
- Don't Call Me Charlie!
- Du Pont Show of the Week
- Empire
- Ensign O'Toole
- The Huntley–Brinkley Report
- It's a Man's World
- Laramie
- The Lively Ones
- Saints and Sinners
- Sam Benedict
- Wide Country

Note: The * indicates that the program was introduced in midseason. The ** indicates that the program ran only for a partial season.
