= Macdonald Carey =

American actor (1913–1994)

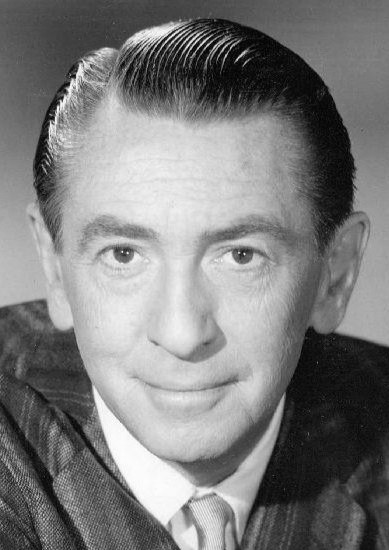
- Carey in 1969
- Born: Edward Macdonald Carey; March 15, 1913; Sioux City, Iowa, U.S.
- Died: March 21, 1994 (aged 81); Beverly Hills, California, U.S.
- Burial place: Holy Cross Cemetery, Culver City, California, U.S.
- Education: University of Wisconsin–Madison; University of Iowa
- Occupation: Actor
- Years active: 1938–1994
- Spouse: Elizabeth Heckscher (m. 1943; div. 1969)
- Partner: Lois Kraines (1973–1994) (his death)
- Children: 6, including Lynn Carey
- Relatives: Aras Baskauskas (grandson)
- Military career
- Allegiance: US
- Branch: United States Marine Corps
- Unit: Air Warning Squadron 3
- Conflicts: World War II; Philippines campaign

Edward Macdonald Carey (March 15, 1913 – March 21, 1994) was an American actor. He first made his career starring in various B-movies from the 1940s through the 1960s, (with a few A-picture exceptions like Hitchcock's Shadow of a Doubt), and was known in many Hollywood circles as "King of the Bs". Beginning in 1965, he portrayed patriarch Dr. Tom Horton on NBC's soap opera Days of Our Lives. For almost three decades, he was the show's central cast member, winning two Daytime Emmy Awards.

== Early life ==
Edward Macdonald Carey was born on March 15, 1913 in Sioux City, Iowa. He graduated from the University of Iowa in Iowa City with a bachelor's degree in 1935, after attending the University of Wisconsin–Madison for a year where he was a member of Alpha Delta Phi. He became involved with the drama school at the University of Iowa and decided to become an actor.

== Career ==
=== Radio and Broadway ===
Carey toured with the Globe Players. He began to work steadily on radio, including playing Dick Grosvenor on the soap opera Stella Dallas and Ridgeway Tearle in John's Other Wife, both in the early 1940s. He was also in Lights Out.

Carey was on Broadway in Lady in the Dark (1941) opposite Gertrude Lawrence, Danny Kaye and Victor Mature. His performance led to him receiving a contract offer from Paramount. He later recalled, "1941 was probably the greatest year of my life. I got my first big hit with Lady in the Dark, I got married and I signed with Paramount Pictures. I only wish I could remember it all better." The reason was his alcoholism.

=== Film appearances and World War II service ===
Carey made his film debut in Star Spangled Rhythm (1942). Paramount gave him the third lead in Take a Letter, Darling (1942), directed by Mitchell Leisen. He followed it with Dr. Broadway (1942), which was his first starring role. He had a leading part in Wake Island (1942), directed by John Farrow, a big hit.

Carey's career received a boost when borrowed by Alfred Hitchcock at Universal to play the romantic lead in Shadow of a Doubt (1943) with Joseph Cotten and Teresa Wright. However the momentum was halted when he enlisted in the United States Marine Corps. He had two months before he left, which enabled him to star in a musical for Paramount, Salute for Three (1943). Carey received his commission in early 1944 and attended fighter director school at Camp Murphy in Orlando, Florida. After school he served with Air Warning Squadron 3 with stints on Espiritu Santo, Bougainville and Mindanao.

In 1947, Carey returned to Paramount. They put him back into leading roles: Suddenly, It's Spring (1947), directed by Leisen, co-starring Paulette Goddard; Hazard (1948), again with Goddard; and Dream Girl (1948), supporting Betty Hutton, directed by Leisen.

Carey played Cesare Borgia in Bride of Vengeance (1948) alongside Goddard, directed by Leisen, but it was a flop. More popular was a Western, Streets of Laredo (1949), but William Holden was the hero; Carey was the villain.

In 1949, he co-starred as "Nick Carraway" in Alan Ladd's version of The Great Gatsby. Carey followed this with Song of Surrender (1949), once again directed by Leisen.

Universal borrowed Carey for two films: a Western with Maureen O'Hara, Comanche Territory (1950), and South Sea Sinner (1950) with Shelley Winters.

Back at Paramount he was in a low budget film noir, The Lawless (1950) directed by Joseph Losey. Back at Paramount he was a villain to Ray Milland in Copper Canyon (1950), directed by John Farrow. At Paramount he was Jesse James in The Great Missouri Raid (1951) and was in Mystery Submarine (1950) at Universal.

Carey supported Red Skelton at MGM in Excuse My Dust (1951).

At 20th Century Fox Carey supported Betty Grable in Meet Me After the Show (1951) and Claudette Colbert in Let's Make It Legal (1951). He went back to Universal for Cave of Outlaws (1951)

He continued to appear in films like My Wife's Best Friend (1952), at Fox with Anne Baxter; Count the Hours (1953), with Teresa Wright at RKO; Hannah Lee (1953), a Western with John Ireland; It's Everybody's Business (1953), and Malaga (1954) with Maureen O'Hara.

Later films included Stranger at My Door (1956), a Western for Republic Pictures, and Odongo (1956) for Warwick Films.

Carey returned to Broadway in Anniversary Waltz (1954–55), directed by Moss Hart, which was a big hit and ran for two years.

=== Television ===
While still a featured player in films, Carey began appearing on television in episodes of The Christophers, Celanese Theatre, Hope Chest, and Lux Video Theatre. As time went on, Carey's work was increasingly on the small screen, including appearances on The Quiet Gun, Stage 7, Science Fiction Theatre, Hour of Stars, Celebrity Playhouse, and The 20th Century Fox Hour, where he appeared as Fred Gaily in a remake of the 1947 film classic, Miracle on 34th Street, starring Teresa Wright and Thomas Mitchell.

He was also featured on General Electric Theater, Screen Directors Playhouse, The Alcoa Hour, and Climax!. Carey managed a single, starring turn as a young professor traveling cross-country in the fifth season of Alfred Hitchcock Presents ("Coyote Moon") as well.

==== Dr. Christian ====
In 1956, Carey took over the role of the kindly small-town physician Dr. Christian, a character created in the late 1930s by actor Jean Hersholt on radio and in films. Carey portrayed Dr. Christian on syndicated television for one season.

Carey guested on The Kaiser Aluminium Hour, The Joseph Cotten Show, The Jane Wyman Show, Zane Grey Theatre, Wagon Train, Studio One in Hollywood, Playhouse 90, The Frank Sinatra Show, Suspicion, Target, Pursuit, Schlitz Playhouse, DuPont Show of the Month, and Rawhide.

Carey was in the Western film Man or Gun (1958), for Republic. and The Redeemer (1959). He played patriot Patrick Henry in John Paul Jones (1959), directed by John Farrow who had worked with Carey at Paramount. He appeared in Blue Denim (1959).

==== Lock Up ====
Carey starred as crusading Herb Maris in the 1950s syndicated series Lock-Up. A total of seventy-eight episodes were made between 1959 and 1961.

Carey guest starred on Alfred Hitchcock Presents, Moment of Fear, Thriller ("The Devil's Ticket"), The United States Steel Hour, Insight, Target, Checkmate and The Alfred Hitchcock Hour.

Carey went to England to make the films The Devil's Agent (1962) and The Damned (1963), for director Joseph Losey.

In the first season of The Outer Limits, Carey starred in the episode titled "The Special One". He was also in The Dick Powell Theatre, Kraft Mystery Theatre, and Arrest and Trial,

Carey supported Sandra Dee in Tammy and the Doctor (1963). He guest starred in the 1964–1965 sitcom The Bing Crosby Show on ABC. He appeared as Mr. Edwards in the 1963 episode "Pay the Two Dollars" of the NBC education drama series, Mr. Novak, starring James Franciscus. He could also be seen on Burke's Law, Branded, Kraft Suspense Theatre, Run for Your Life, Ben Casey, Lassie, and Bewitched.

==== Days of Our Lives ====
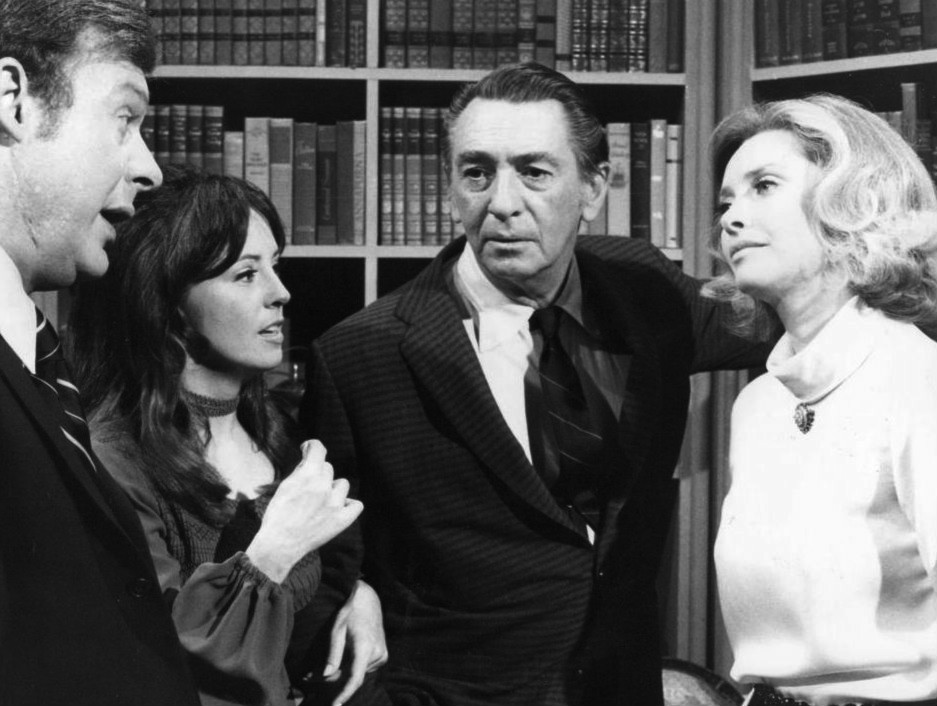
Cast 1971 photo of Days of Our Lives (L–R): Edward Mallory, Denise Alexander, MacDonald Carey and Susan Flannery

Carey played Tom Horton on Days of Our Lives from its first episode in 1965. Carey said he took the show "because I couldn't get a movie at the time". He continued as Tom Horton until his death from lung cancer in Beverly Hills, California, in 1994.

During this time, Carey suffered from a drinking problem, and eventually joined Alcoholics Anonymous in 1982.

A longtime pipe smoker, he was seen in many films and early episodes of Days of Our Lives with it. He was ordered by his doctor to quit in September 1991 after having to take a leave of absence from Days in order to remove a cancerous tumor from one of his lungs. He returned to the show in November of that year.

He is most recognized today as the voice who recites the epigraph each day before the program begins: "Like sands through the hourglass, so are the Days of Our Lives." From 1966 to 1994 he would also intone, "This is Macdonald Carey, and these are the Days of Our Lives." (After Carey's death, the producers, out of respect for Carey's family, decided not to use the second part of the opening tagline.) At each intermission, his voice also says "We will return for the second half of Days of Our Lives in just a moment". Since the Horton family is still regarded as the core of Days of Our Lives, his memory has been allowed to remain imprinted on the show by leaving the voice-overs intact. He also served as voice-over for the very first PBS ident, in which he said "This is PBS ... the Public Broadcasting Service."

==== Other appearances ====
Carey continued to act in other productions during his run on Days. He had roles in Gidget Gets Married (1972), The Magician, Ordeal (1973), Owen Marshall, Counsellor at Law, Who Is the Black Dahlia? (1975), McMillan & Wife, Police Story, Switch, The Hardy Boys/Nancy Drew Mysteries, Fantasy Island and Buck Rogers in the 25th Century.

He later appeared in many all-star television miniseries, such as Roots, The Rebels, The Top of the Hill and Condominium.

He was in the films Foes (1977), End of the World (1977), and Summer of Fear (1978), and had a small part in American Gigolo (1980).

Carey was in the TV movie The Girl, the Gold Watch & Everything (1980) and the films Access Code (1984) and It's Alive III: Island of the Alive (1987). He guest starred on Finder of Lost Loves, and Murder, She Wrote. His last non-Days role was in A Message from Holly (1992).

Carey did the onstage introduction for the "Stars of the Days Of Our Lives" and musical artist/director Ricky Dee at the Greek Theatre (1992).

== Published work ==
Carey wrote several books of poetry, and a 1991 autobiography, The Days of My Life. For his contribution to television, Carey has a star on the Hollywood Walk of Fame, at 6536 Hollywood Boulevard.

== Personal life ==
Carey was married to Elizabeth Heckscher from 1941 until their divorce in 1969. They had six children: Lynn, Lisa, Stevens, Theresa, Edward Macdonald Jr., and Paul. Later, he dated Lois Kraines. The couple remained together from 1973 until Carey's death. His grandchildren include Ellie Diamond and Vytas and Aras Baskauskas. He has a godson, Maurice Heckscher.

Carey was a Roman Catholic, and a member of the Good Shepherd Parish and the Catholic Motion Picture Guild in Beverly Hills, California.

In September 1991, Carey had a cancerous tumor surgically removed from his lung.

Carey died on March 21, 1994, six days after his 81st birthday. He is buried at Holy Cross Cemetery in Culver City, California.

== Filmography ==
=== Film ===
Year	Title	Role	Notes
1942	Take a Letter, Darling	Jonathan Caldwell	
1942	Dr. Broadway	Dr. Timothy Kane a.k.a. Dr. Broadway	
1942	Wake Island	Lieutenant Bruce Cameron	
1942	Star Spangled Rhythm	Louie the Lug in Skit	
1943	Shadow of a Doubt	Detective Jack Graham	
1943	Salute for Three	Buzz McAllister	
1947	Suddenly, It's Spring	Jack Lindsay	
1947	Variety Girl	Himself	
1948	Hazard	J.D. Storm	
1948	Dream Girl	Clark Redfield	
1949	Bride of Vengeance	Cesare Borgia	
1949	Streets of Laredo	Lorn Reming	
1949	The Great Gatsby	Nicholas 'Nick' Carraway	
1949	Song of Surrender	Bruce Eldridge	
1950	South Sea Sinner	William Jacob 'Jake' Davis	
1950	Copper Canyon	Deputy Lane Travis	
1950	Comanche Territory	James Bowie	
1950	The Lawless	Larry Wilder	
1950	Mystery Submarine	Dr. Brett Young	
1951	The Great Missouri Raid	Jesse James	
1951	Excuse My Dust	Cyrus Random, Jr.	
1951	Meet Me After the Show	Jeff Ames	
1951	Let's Make It Legal	Hugh Halsworth	
1951	Cave of Outlaws	Pete Carver	
1952	My Wife's Best Friend	George Mason	
1953	Count the Hours	Doug Madison	
1953	Hannah Lee: An American Primitive	Bus Crow	
1954	Malaga	Van Logan	aka Fire Over Africa
1954	It's Everybody's Business	Narrator (voice)	Short
1956	Stranger at My Door	Hollis Jarret	
1956	Odongo: An Adventure of the African Frontier	Steve Stratton	
1958	Man or Gun	'Maybe' Smith / Scott Yancey	
1959	The Redeemer	Jesus Christ	Voice
1959	John Paul Jones	Patrick Henry	
1959	Blue Denim	Major Malcolm Bartley, Retired	
1962	The Devil's Agent	Mr. Smith	
1962	The Damned	Simon Wells	
1963	Stranglehold	Bill Morrison	
1963	Tammy and the Doctor	Dr. Wayne Bentley	
1977	End of the World	John Davis	
1977	Foes	McCarey	
1980	American Gigolo	Hollywood Actor	(as MacDonald Carey)
1984	Access Code	Senator Williams	
1987	It's Alive III: Island of the Alive	Judge Watson	

=== Television ===
Year	Title	Role	Notes
1950–1958	Studio One	Jim Kerry / Lenny Byrnes	2 episodes
1952	Celanese Theatre	Carrol	Season 1 Episode 18: "Yellow Jack"
1952	Hollywood Opening Night		Season 2 Episode 7: "Hope Chest"
1952	The Christophers		Episode: Good Government Principles
1952–1954	Lux Video Theatre	Dan Shelvin / Major Slocum / Colby	3 episodes
1952–1957	The Ford Television Theatre	Harry Cummings / Brother Philip Hart / Mace Prouty / Jon	4 episodes
1953–1956	General Electric Theater	David Bothwell	2 episodes
1955	Appointment with Adventure	Cal	Season 1 Episode 4: "The Quiet Gun
1955	Stage 7	Philippo / Jim Blandings	Credited as Mac Donald Carey; 2 episodes
1955	Science Fiction Theatre	Dr. Lee Seward	Season 1 Episode 25: "The Human Equation
1955–1956	The 20th Century-Fox Hour	Fred Gaily / Lew Marsh	2 episodes
1955–1956	Climax!	John Benson / Tom Ditmar / Allen Moore / Harry Belgard	4 episodes
1956	Celebrity Playhouse		Season 1 Episode 16: "Live Bait"
1956	Screen Directors Playhouse	Gil Foster (as MacDonald Carey) / William Tyler	2 episodes
1956	The Alcoa Hour	George Spencer	Season 2 Episode 1: "Flight Into Danger"
1956–1957	Dr. Christian	Dr. Mark Christian	Series regular
1956–1961	The United States Steel Hour	Jim / Bill Dulaney	2 episodes
1957	The Kaiser Aluminum Hour	Howard Crane	Season 1 Episode 17: "Whereabouts Unknown"
1957	On Trial	Mike	Season 1 Episode 24: "Alibi for Murder"
1957	Jane Wyman Presents The Fireside Theatre	Carleton Reed	Season 3 Episode 3: "The Man on the Thirty-fifth Floor"
1957	Zane Grey Theatre	Sheriff Tom Baker	Season 2 Episode 18: "License to Kill"
1957–1958	Suspicion	Jeremiah Taylor / Ben Forbes	2 episodes
1958	Wagon Train	Bill Tawnee	Season 1 Episode 22: "The Bill Tawnee Story"
1958	Playhouse 90	Alexander Lamar	Season 2 Episode 36: "Natchez"
1958	The Frank Sinatra Show	Paul Armstrong	Season 1 Episode 32: "The Seedling Doubt"
1958	Target	Herbert L. Maris	2 episodes
1958	Pursuit	Harry Taback	Season 1 Episode 1: "The Vengeance"
1959	Rawhide	Brother Bent	Season 1 Episode 10: "Incident of the Golden Calf"
1959	The DuPont Show of the Month	Kenny	Season 2 Episode 7: "The Human Comedy"
1959	Alfred Hitchcock Presents	Professor	Season 5 Episode 4: "Coyote Moon"
1959–1961	Lock Up	Herbert L. Maris	Series regular
1960	Moment of Fear	Jim Mellanby	Season 1 Episode 1: "The Golden Deed"
1961	Thriller	Hector Vane	Season 1 Episode 29: "The Devil's Ticket"
1962	Insight	James Madison	Season 1 Episode 22: "Christ, Caesar, Conscience"
1962	Target: The Corruptors	Judge Andrew Leroy	Season 1 Episode 28: "The Blind Goddess"
1962	Checkmate	Frederic Haley	Season 2 Episode 30: "Rendezvous in Washington"
1962	The Alfred Hitchcock Hour	John Mitchell (as MacDonald Carey)	Season 1 Episode 8: "House Guest"
1963	The Dick Powell Show	Lieutenant Duff Peterson	Season 2 Episode 30: "Last of the Private Eyes"
1963	Kraft Mystery Theater		Season 3 Episode 2: "The Image Merchants"
1963	Mr. Novak	Mr. Edwards	Season 1 Episode 10: "Pay the Two Dollars"
1963–1965	Burke's Law	Ben Gardner / Burl Mason / Franklyn Warren / Waldo Nicely	4 episodes
1964	The Outer Limits	Roy Benjamin (as MacDonald Carey)	Season 1 Episode 28: "The Special One"
1964	Arrest and Trial	Professor Marcus Kane	Season 1 Episode 29: "Those Which Love Has Made"
1964	The Bing Crosby Show		Season 1 Episode 7: "The Education of Bing Collins"
1965	Daniel Boone	Henry Pitcairn	Season 1 Episode 17: "A Place of 1000 Spirits"
1965	Branded	Sen. Lansing	Season 1 Episode 8: "The Mission: Part 1"
1965	Kraft Suspense Theatre	Elmer Pike (as MacDonald Carey)	Season 2 Episode 20: "The Green Felt Jungle"
1965	Run for Your Life	Michael Allen	2 episodes
1965	Ben Casey	George McFadden	Season 5 Episode 10: "The Importance of Being 65937"
1965–1994	Days of Our Lives	Dr. Tom Horton	Series regular 3027 episodes
1966	Lassie	Jebediah Wakefield / Elderly Lawyer	2 episodes
1967	Bewitched	Joe Baxter	Season 4 Episode 7: "Birdies, Bogies and Baxter"
1972	Gidget Gets Married	Russ Lawrence	TV Movie; ABC Movie of the Week
1973	The Magician	Rich	Season 1 Episode 3: "Illusion in Terror"
1973	Ordeal	Eliot Frost	TV Movie
1974	Owen Marshall, Counselor at Law	Earl Ryder	Season 3 Episode 22: "The Desertion of Keith Ryder"
1974–1977	Police Story	Mr. Austin / Chief Blandings / Capt. Richard MacDonald (as Mac Donald Carey)	3 episodes
1975	Who Is the Black Dahlia?	Captain Jack Donahoe	TV Movie
1976	McMillan & Wife	Dr. Gunther	Season 5 Episode 5: "The Deadly Cure"
1977	Roots	Squire James	Miniseries; Season 1 Episode 6: "Part VI"
1978	Switch	Ray (as MacDonald Carey)	Season 3 Episode 16: "Formula for Murder"
1978	Stranger in Our House	Professor Jarvis - Special appearance by	TV Movie
1978	The Hardy Boys/Nancy Drew Mysteries	Senator John Martin	Season 3 Episode 6: "Scorpion's Sting"
1979	The Rebels	Dr. Church	Miniseries
1979	Buck Rogers in the 25th Century	Dr. Mallory	Season 1 Episode 2: "Planet of the Slave Girls"
1979	Top of the Hill	Mitchell	TV Movie
1979–1981	Fantasy Island	Hobart / Alfred Gerrard	2 episodes
1980	The Girl, the Gold Watch & Everything	Mr. Walton Grumby	TV Movie
1980	Condominium	Dr. Arthur Castor (as MacDonald Carey)	TV Movie
1985	Finder of Lost Loves	Norman Prentice	Season 1 Episode 12: "Last Wish"
1986–1987	Murder, She Wrote	Defense Atty. Oscar Ramsey / Dr. Lynch	2 episodes
1992	A Message from Holly	Judge Caulfield	TV Movie

== Radio appearances ==
Year	Program	Episode/source
1952	Stars over Hollywood	Under a Lucky Star
1952	Stars in the Air	Suddenly, It's Spring
1953	Stars over Hollywood	I Found Glenda Roberts
1953	Cavalcade of America	Bless This House
1953	Cavalcade of America	Dangerous Mission
1953	Stars over Hollywood	A Bunch of Keys

== Awards and nominations ==
- Daytime Emmy Awards
  - (1974) Daytime Emmy Outstanding Actor in a Daytime Drama Series for Days of Our Lives
  - (1975) Daytime Emmy Outstanding Actor in a Daytime Drama Series for Days of Our Lives
- Soap Opera Digest Awards
  - (1984) Soap Opera Digest Award Outstanding Actor in a Mature Role in a Daytime Serial for Days of Our Lives
  - (1985) Soap Opera Digest Award Outstanding Actor in a Mature Role in a Daytime Serial for Days of Our Lives
  - (1990) Soap Opera Digest Editors Choice award
