= Summer Playhouse (1964 TV series) =

- Country of origin: United States
- Original language: English

Production
- Producer: Don Fedderson
- Running time: 30 minutes

Original release
- Network: CBS
- Release: July 4, 1964 – September 6, 1965

Summer Playhouse is a 30-minute anthology television series that aired on CBS during the summers of 1964 and 1965. It consisted of unsold television pilots and reruns of episodes of other anthology series.

== Background and production ==
The practice of television executives of ordering dozens of pilots for proposed television series each year – far more than their networks could possibly broadcast as series – created a sizable body of unsold pilots that had never aired. Packaging these unsold pilots in anthology series and airing them during the summer provided television networks with a way of both providing fresh programming during the summer rerun season and recouping at least some of the expense of producing them. Summer Playhouse was one of these series.

Don Fedderson produced Summer Playhouse, and Steve Allen, Jimmy Durante, and Fred MacMurray were among its notable stars.

== Broadcast history ==
Replacing The New Phil Silvers Show, Summer Playhouse ran for 12 episodes over 12 consecutive weeks in the summer of 1964, airing on CBS from 9:30 to 10:00 p.m. Eastern Time on Saturday evenings. It premiered on July 4, and its last episode that year aired on September 19. It returned in 1965 as a summer replacement for The Andy Griffith Show, premiering on June 28 and running on Monday evenings from 8:30 to 9:00 p.m. Eastern Time for 11 consecutive weeks. Its final episode was broadcast on September 6, 1965.

== Episodes ==
=== Season 1 (1964) ===
No. in season	Title	Directed by	Written by	Original release date
1	"The Free Wheelers"	Sherman Marks	Robert Riley Crutcher & Sherman Marks	July 4, 1964
A young American couple — a man who writes travel books and his imaginative wife — becomes involved in international intrigue during a visit to Paris when she makes eyes at a French playboy while trying to steal a secret document. She hides the document in a man's hat, the man walks away with it, and an international mess ensues. Starring Patricia Barry, Tommy Noonan, Elvia Allman, Jacques Bergerac, Gaylord Cavallaro, Fritz Feld, Kathleen Freeman, Nancy Kulp, Louis Mercier, and Reggie Nalder. A repeat of an episode of General Electric Theater that originally aired on February 18, 1962.
2	"The McGonigle"	Ralph Murphy	Dick Chevillat, Dan Gallery, & Ray Singer	July 11, 1964
Two United States Navy sailors aboard an aircraft carrier work around their stern commanding officer and a boatswain's mate who actually runs the ship as they try to help a USO entertainer meet up with her husband, a young sailor, so that they can have a honeymoon rendezvous aboard the ship. Starring Mickey Shaughnessy, Tom D'Andrea, Frank Gerstle, Wally Cassell, Charlie Picerni, Norman Grabowski, Mark Damon, and Diane Jergens. A repeat of an episode of NBC's Westinghouse Preview Theatre that originally aired on July 28, 1961.
3	"The Jimmy Durante Show"	Hy Averback	Mel Diamond, Billy Friedburg & Mel Tolkin	July 18, 1964
Well-known entertainer Jimmy Banister and his sister Rosie have raised their orphaned grandson Eddie. Jimmy and Eddie sometimes sing together, and Jimmy is anxious for Eddie to follow in his footsteps as an entertainer, even arranging to film a television spectacular starring the two of them. But after Eddie completes elementary school he looks forward to going to prep school with his friends, and conflict arises as Eddie confronts a choice between more school or a show business career. Starring Jimmy Durante, Ralph Bell, Audrey Christie, Barry Gordon, Eddie Hodges, Dorothy Konrad, John McIntire, Kevin O'Neal, and Darryl Richard. An unsold pilot for a proposed situation comedy to be called The Jimmy Durante Show.
4	"The Miss and Missiles"	Peter Tewksbury	Everett Freeman	July 25, 1964
While fashionable career woman and magazine writer Connie Marlowe is trying to get her younger brother Buzz through his driving test, she receives an assignment from her boss, John P. McBain, to write a story on the emerging Jet Age and get an interview with a handsome test pilot, United States Air Force Colonel Bill Adams. When Adams arrives at Connie's home for the interview, the two have instant chemistry, while the teenaged Buzz comes down with an instant case of hero worship. As events unfold, Adams manages to get both Buzz and the housekeeper out of the house so that he and Connie can be alone — and not just for an interview. Starring Gisele MacKenzie, John Forsythe, Rosemarie Ace, George Baxter, Jocelyn Brando, James Chandler, Karen Noel Dolin, Jack Finch, Kathleen Freeman, Gordon Gebert, John McGiver, Edo Mita, Michael J. Pollard, and William Schallert. A repeat of an episode of Lux Playhouse that originally aired on June 12, 1959.
5	"You're Only Young Once"	Richard L. Bare	Norman Riley	August 1, 1964
Due to their precarious finances, Casey and Liza McDermott, a young newlywed couple attending the University of Southern California, are forced to live in an on-campus Quonset hut village that serves as a college dormitory for married students — and trouble arises when Liza finds Casey in the arms of Mildred Offenbach. An unsold pilot starring Lynn Alden, Phillip O'Hanlon, Patricia Blair, Charlie Briggs, Ann Morgan Gilbert, Gary Hunley, Jim Hutton, Frank Killmond, and Dorothy Provine. A repeat of an episode of The Comedy Spot that originally aired on September 11, 1962.
6	"Low Man on a Totem Pole"	John Newland	Bill Manhoff & H. Allen Smith	August 8, 1964
A humorous look at the real life of humorist H. Allen Smith, who charts a confusing course through life in Greenwich Village in New York City and struggles to get his publisher to publish his work, while his understanding wife tries to live a calm life. Smith encounters a number of difficulties, including a neighbor's cat that is disturbing the Japanese radish he planted in his tiny garden and the prospect of losing his job when a United States senator objects to something he has written in his column. Starring Dan Dailey, Diana Lynn, Robert McGivern, Bill Bixby, John McGiver, Pedro Gonzalez Gonzalez, Cliff Norton, Irene Tedrow, Gloria Pall, and John Haveron. Based on Smith's book Low Man on a Totem Pole.
7	"Missile Maisie"	Edward Ludwig	Wilson Collison & Mary R. McCall	August 15, 1964
After she wins the Miss Guided Missile beauty contest, Maisie Ravier, an unemployed showgirl born and raised in Brooklyn, New York, must visit a backwater United States Army post in the small town of Clary to support its recruiting program, and her capers breathe new life into the town. When Clary decides to hold a celebration of the 200th anniversary of its founding, she decides to help the townspeople promote it — and when the celebration seems to be falling flat, she decides to stir things up by performing some aerial acrobatics. Starring Janis Paige, Lin McCarthy, Joe Sawyer, Olive Carey, James Mahoney, Rudy Lee, and Henry Kulky. Based on the Maisie Ravier character from Wilson Collison's 1935 novel Dark Dame. A repeat of an episode of New Comedy Showcase originally aired on September 12, 1960, with the title "Maisie."
8	"An Apartment in Rome"	Richard Kinon	Sol Saks	August 22, 1964
Debbie and Steve are a young American married couple living happily in a shabby little apartment in Rome and trying to make ends meet on Steve's income as an artist. When they learn that Debbie's staid aunt and uncle from Stamford, Connecticut, are coming to visit them, they are certain that the visitors will disapprove of their Bohemian lifestyle. They panic and go to great lengths to put on appearances to impress the visitors — and keep the visitors from seeing their apartment. Starring Susan Oliver, Allen Case, Howard St. John, Lurene Tuttle, and Marie Windsor.
9	"Mimi"	Philip Rapp	Philip Rapp	August 29, 1964
When the famous French ballet dancer Monsieur Quibideaux and a Japanese jockey who has outgrown his saddle visit an exclusive health resort called the Garden of Eden to lose weight, a gleeful, flighty staff member who tries to help becomes a nuisance instead, annoying the guests. She particularly annoys Quibideaux by — among other things — dancing into his room and performing a flying tour jeté to get his attention. Starring Mimi Hines, Phil Ford, Thomas Gomez, Dan Tobin, Roger Etienne, Lee Patrick, Lili Garner, Lloyd Kino, and Yoneo Iguchi. Produced by Philip Rapp.
10	"The Apartment House"	Sidney Miller	George Tibbles	September 5, 1964
Wally Weaver is the much-harassed manager of an apartment building filled with eccentric tenants, and he tends to get in trouble by trying to be helpful to them. On a night when his wife Marge is hosting a reunion dinner for her high school friends, Wally upsets her by agreeing to take care of a tenant's pet monkey, then goes upstairs to assist a pretty blonde woman who insists that he help her put out a fire in her kitchen. To placate Marge, he borrows a fur stole from a tenant for Marge to wear during her dinner so she can impress her friends. Starring George Gobel, Sue Anne Langdon, Stanley Adams, Jane Withers, Christine Nelson, Woodrow Parfrey, Beverly Powers, and Naomi Stevens, with cameo appearances by Steve Allen, William Frawley, Reginald Gardiner, and Fred MacMurray. Originally titled "Reunion" as an episode for a proposed series, The Apartment House.
11	"Satan's Waitin'"	Charles F. Haas	Joel Malone	September 12, 1964
A handsome, greedy opportunist and a lonely unmarried woman develop a mutual attraction because he is single and she is wealthy — but then an unidentified man, perhaps Satan himself, interferes in their lives. Starring Ray Walston, Jo Van Fleet, Lee Phillips, Sue Randall, Simon Twigg, and Tom Greenway. Walston plays several minor roles and narrates the episode.
12	"The Human Comedy"	Robert Ellis Miller	William Saroyan	September 19, 1964
A teenage boy in a small town becomes the oldest male in his household after his father's sudden death. Determined to take over as the man of the house and the family breadwinner, he decides to make money by starting a delivery service with his younger brother. Starring Phyllis Avery, Tim Rooney, Jimmy Honer, and Arthur O'Connell. Based on the 1943 novel The Human Comedy by William Saroyan.

=== Season 2 (1965) ===
No. in season	Title	Directed by	Written by	Original release date
1	"McGhee"	Don McGuire	Don McGuire	June 28, 1965
Willie McGhee, an unemployed and impoverished young New York City painter (or writer, according to one source), inherits the small Southern California town of Cleveland from his late uncle, who had won the town in a dice game. Upon arriving in California, he meets his distant cousin and friend Hilda and the town's city manager, Ann Dorsey — and discovers not only that the town is bankrupt, but also that the townspeople are counting on him to put it back on its financial feet. Starring Jeremy Slate, Karen Steele, George Chandler, and Connie Sawyer.
2	"Sally and Sam"	Vincent Sherman	Hal Kanter	July 5, 1965
Handsome young Sam Cody bluffs his way into the New York City apartment of a pretty young woman, Sally Martin. He tells her that he a doctor from Baltimore and a cousin of her roommate, come to stay at Sally's apartment at the invitation of her roommate while her roommate is spending the weekend in the Berkshires. She warms to him, they spend a weekend together sightseeing and dining in the city, and she lets him spend the night on her couch. As she is beginning to fall for him, she discovers that he did it all on a US$25.00 bet that he could get into her apartment that he had made with another man she had gone on a date with previously. When she finds out about the bet, she slaps Sam and storms off — much to Sam's chagrin, because he is falling for her as well. Starring Cynthia Pepper, Gary Lockwood, Bernie Kopell, Nancy Jeris, John Qualen, Jay Strong, Phyllis Douglas, and David Burns. Produced by Vincent Sherman. Originally titled "They Meet" as the unsold pilot for the proposed situation comedy Sally and Sam (sometimes referred to as "Sam and Sally").
3	"Mr. Belevdere"	Frederick De Cordova	Richard Sale	July 12, 1965
A suave and fashionable gentleman who is an eccentric genius prone to helping other people with their problems helps a young girl who hopes to see her father perform at Carnegie Hall. Starring Victor Buono, Debbie Paine, Leland Howard, Louise Troy, Harry Bellaver, Pamela Truman, Martin Brill. Based on the Clifton Webb movies Sitting Pretty (1948), Mr. Belvedere Goes to College (1949), and Mr. Belvedere Rings the Bell (1951).
4	"Acres and Pains"	Perry Lafferty	Harvey Orkin, S. J. Perelman, David R. Schwartz	July 19, 1965
After a New York City writer becomes exasperated with life in the city, he and his wife buy a decrepit farmhouse, but have trouble evicting its tenant. A duel of wits ensues — and ends with the writer and his wife living in the back room of a bowling alley. Starring Walter Matthau, Anne Jackson, Edward Andrews, Philip Coolidge, David Doyle, David Hartman, Alice Pearce, and Jerry Stiller. A repeat of an episode of General Electric Theater that originally aired on May 12, 1962.
5	"Full Speed Anywhere"	Don Taylor	Jack Elinson & Charles Isaacs	July 26, 1965
The bored crewmen of a small United States Coast Guard patrol boat find their harbor patrol duties tedious, but they finally receive orders for some action – participation in fleet maneuvers. But then a yeoman comes down with the mumps, and the patrol boat's commanding officer and crew conspire to get him ashore unnoticed. An unsold pilot starring Stubby Kaye, Conrad Janis, George Dunn, Glen Turnbull, Pedro Gonzalez Gonzalez, Edwin Bruce, and Jonathan Hale. A repeat of an episode of The Comedy Spot that originally aired on September 13, 1960.
6	"Kibbe Hates Fitch"	Stanley Prager	Neil Simon	August 2, 1965
Two sisters and their firefighter husbands decide to move into a duplex together. Soon one of the husbands is promoted, threatening their friendship, and the two men are at each others' throats — much to the consternation of their wives and the fire chief. Starring Lou Jacobi, Don Rickles, Pert Kelton, Nancy Andrews, William Ade, Karleen Wiese, Nathaniel Frey, Ralph Dunn, Herbert Edelman, and Bob Kaliban.
7	"Hello D'ere"	Unknown	Unknown	August 9, 1965
Faced with losing their jobs, two newsmen insist that they can get the story of the year. Starring Marty Allen and Steve Rossi.
8	"The Young at Heart"	Fletcher Markle	Whitfield Cook	August 16, 1965
A sorority′s strict house mother who often is at odds with the house's residents angers them when she tells the dean about a football player's late-night visit to the house. Starring Mercedes McCambridge, Barbara Bain, Lin Foster, Carolyn Kearney, Nancy Marshall, Kay Stewart, and Charles Watts.
9	"Mimi"	Philip Rapp	Philip Rapp	August 23, 1965
When the famous French ballet dancer Monsieur Quibideaux and a Japanese jockey who has outgrown his saddle visit an exclusive health resort called the Garden of Eden to lose weight, a gleeful, flighty staff member who tries to help becomes a nuisance instead, annoying the guests. She particularly annoys Quibideaux by — among other things — dancing into his room and performing a flying tour jeté to get his attention. Starring Mimi Hines, Phil Ford, Thomas Gomez, Dan Tobin, Roger Etienne, Lee Patrick, Lili Garner, Lloyd Kino, and Yoneo Iguchi. Produced by Philip Rapp. A repeat of an episode previously aired on Summer Playhouse on August 29, 1964.
10	"Take Him, He's All Yours"	Don Taylor	Sy Gomberg & Al Lewis	August 30, 1965
An American woman who moves to London with her daughter to manage a travel agency for a wealthy tycoon is forced to work with the owner's inept nephew — a crazy Englishman who turns the office into a madhouse with wild promotions he dreams up. Starring Eve Arden, Cindy Carol, Derek Bond, Jeremy Lloyd, Roger Avon, Katy Greenwood, Nicholas Parsons, Ambrosine Phillpotts, Howard Smith, and Pauline Chamberlain. A repeat of an episode that originally aired on Vacation Playhouse with the title "He's All Yours" on July 20, 1964.
11	"His Model Wife"	Norman Tokar	Barbara Avedon	September 6, 1965
Jeanne and John Lauren — a former model and a magazine publisher, respectively — are a married couple with two children. They decide that their recently hired housekeeper, Miss Biekel, is not measuring up, particularly in caring for their two sons. However, they disagree on how to tell her that her services are no longer needed and on who should break the news to her. Trying to work up the courage to give Miss Biekel the bad news, they begin separate efforts to fire her. An unsold pilot starring Jeanne Crain, John Vivyan, Jimmie Lee Gaines, Alice Frost, Jack Mullaney, Jerry Barclay, Frances Robinson, Annelle Hayes, and Larri Thomas. Produced by Tony Owen. Filmed in 1960. A repeat of an episode of The Comedy Spot that originally aired on September 4, 1962.
