= Top-rated United States television programs of 1964–65 =

This table displays the top-rated primetime television series of the 1964–65 season as measured by Nielsen Media Research.

| Rank | Program | Network | Rating |
|---|---|---|---|
| 1 | Bonanza | NBC | 36.3 |
| 2 | Bewitched | ABC | 31.0 |
| 3 | Gomer Pyle, U.S.M.C. | CBS | 30.7 |
| 4 | The Andy Griffith Show | CBS | 28.3 |
| 5 | The Fugitive | ABC | 27.9 |
| 6 | The Red Skelton Hour | CBS | 27.4 |
| 7 | The Dick Van Dyke Show | CBS | 27.1 |
| 8 | The Lucy Show | CBS | 26.6 |
| 9 | Peyton Place II | ABC | 26.4 |
| 10 | Combat! | ABC | 26.1 |
| 11 | Walt Disney's Wonderful World of Color | NBC | 25.7 |
| 12 | The Beverly Hillbillies | CBS | 25.6 |
| 13 | My Three Sons | ABC | 25.5 |
| 14 | Branded | NBC | 25.3 |
| 15 | Petticoat Junction | CBS | 25.2 |
| 15 | The Ed Sullivan Show | CBS | 25.2 |
| 17 | Lassie | CBS | 25.1 |
| 18 | The Munsters | CBS | 24.7 |
| 18 | Gilligan's Island | CBS | 24.7 |
| 20 | Peyton Place I | ABC | 24.6 |
| 21 | The Jackie Gleason Show | CBS | 24.4 |
| 22 | The Virginian | NBC | 24.0 |
| 23 | The Addams Family | ABC | 23.9 |
| 24 | My Favorite Martian | CBS | 23.7 |
| 25 | Flipper | NBC | 23.4 |
| 26 | I've Got a Secret | CBS | 23.0 |
| 27 | Gunsmoke | CBS | 22.6 |
| 28 | The Patty Duke Show | ABC | 22.4 |
| 29 | McHale's Navy | ABC | 22.3 |
| 30 | The Lawrence Welk Show | ABC | 22.0 |
