= Philip Ford =

Philip, Phillip or Phil Ford may refer to:

- Philip Ford (film director) (1900–1976), American film director and actor
- Phil Ford (comedian) (1919–2005), vaudeville performer, musician, and comedian
- Phil Ford (writer) (born 1950), British television writer
- Phil Ford (basketball) (born 1956), American basketball player
- Phillip R. Ford (born 1961), American stage and film producer, director, and drag entertainer
- Phil Ford (rugby) (born 1961), Welsh rugby union and rugby league footballer
