= On Parade =

Television series

- Genre: Variety
- Country of origin: Canada
- Original language: English
- No. of seasons: 1

Production
- Running time: 30 minutes

Original release
- Network: CBC
- Release: 24 July – 18 September 1964

On Parade is a Canadian television variety show. It ran one season. The episodes were produced for and first shown on CBC Television in Canada. Each centered on a musical performance by the episode's host or hosts. These were: Rosemary Clooney (17 July), Tony Bennett (24 July), Henry Mancini (31 July), Phil Ford and Mimi Hines (7 August), Juliet Prowse (14 August), Diahann Carroll (21 August), Julius La Rosa (28 August), Jane Morgan (4 September), The Limelighters (11 September), and Steve Lawrence and Eydie Gormé (18 September). Each episode lasted 30 minutes, and the show aired between 24 July 1964 and 18 September 1964. It took over the time slot of the show That Was the Week That Was which went on hiatus until the 1964–1965 season.

The show's music was provided by Nelson Riddle's orchestra. The Limelighters sang "Meetin' Here Tonight", "Whistlin' Gypsy", "Gunslinger", "Sing Up in the Sky", "Brazilian Fisherman's Song", "I Did What I Could", "If I Had a Hammer", and "Thar She Blows". Norman Sawdawie produced the series in Canada.

On Parade served as a summer replacement on NBC in the United States.
