= Hazard (1948 film) =

1948 American film directed by George Marshall

- Directed by: George Marshall
- Screenplay by: Arthur Sheekman; Roy Chanslor
- Based on: Roy Chanslor
- Produced by: Mel Epstein
- Starring: Paulette Goddard; Macdonald Carey
- Cinematography: Daniel L. Fapp
- Edited by: Arthur P. Schmidt (as Arthur Schmidt)
- Music by: Frank Skinner
- Production company: Paramount Pictures
- Distributed by: Paramount Pictures
- Release date: May 28, 1948 (United States)
- Running time: 95 minutes
- Country: United States
- Language: English

Hazard is a 1948 American comedy drama film starring Paulette Goddard and Macdonald Carey, and directed by George Marshall.

== Plot ==
A compulsive gambler, Ellen Crane owes a large debt to Lonnie Burns, a club owner. He cuts a deck of cards with her—if she wins, Burns will forget the IOU, but if she loses, Ellen must marry him. She loses.

Ellen leaves town. A furious Burns hires private eye JD Storm, who tracks her to Chicago. She wins enough money there gambling to continue to Los Angeles, but first finds Storm waiting in her hotel room. She gets the better of him and flees.

An ex-con named Beady takes her to a craps game, where both are arrested. Storm shows up and pays their bail on the condition Ellen return east with him. Storm falls for her along the way, even after Ellen pulls a fast one and has him arrested for abducting her against her will.

Storm talks his way out of that fix. Ellen crashes the car, which catches fire. Storm saves her but is hurt. Ellen goes to Las Vegas but returns to Storm, who wants a justice of the peace to marry them. She feels betrayed when Burns turns up, but Storm fights for her. He proves that Burns won the card-cut with a crooked deck, and he and Ellen are free to get on with their lives.

== Cast ==
- Paulette Goddard as Ellen Crane
- Macdonald Carey as JD Storm
- Fred Clark as Lonnie Burns
- Stanley Clements as Joe Zinkle
- Percy Helton as Beady Robbins (as Percey Helton)
- Maxie Rosenbloom as Truck Driver
- Frank Fenton as Utah Sheriff Bob Waybill
- Frank Faylen as Oscar
- Mary Adams as Matron, Sergeant
- Walter Baldwin as Alfred Clumby, Bookie
- Isabel Randolph as Goldie, Woman in Hotel
- Taylor Holmes as Mr. Meeler
- Charles McGraw as Chick
- Ruth Clifford as Waitress (uncredited)
- James Millican as Houseman
