= The Jerry Lewis Show =

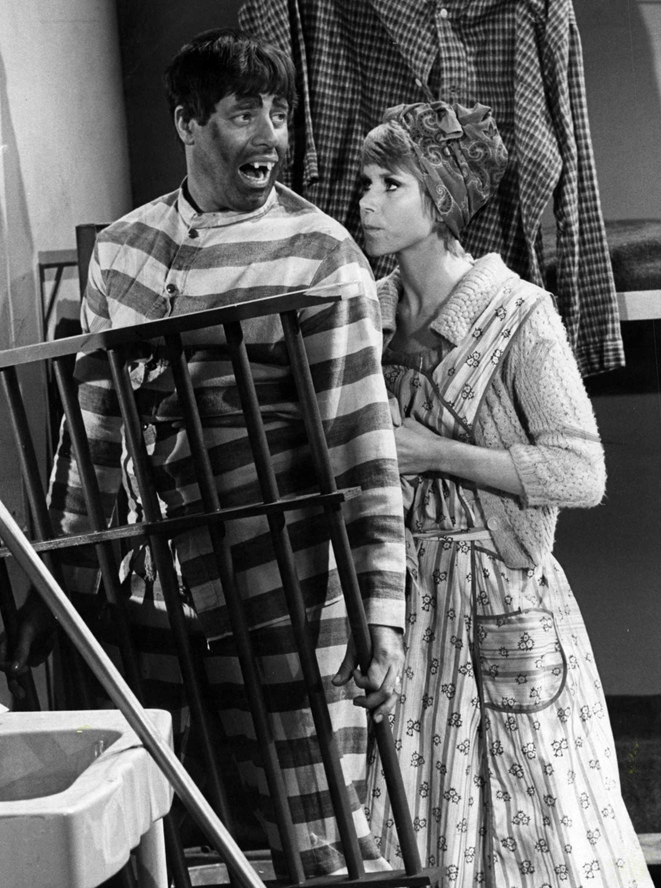
- Jerry Lewis and Judy Carne, 1968
- Genre: Variety, talk, comedy
- Created by: Elton Rule (original version); Bob Finkel (NBC version)
- Directed by: John Dorsey; Jack Shea; Arthur Forrest
- Starring: Jerry Lewis
- Announcer: Del Moore; Charlie Callas (1984)
- Theme music composer: Charlie Chaplin
- Opening theme: "Smile"
- Ending theme: "Smile"
- Country of origin: United States
- Original language: English
- No. of episodes: 13 (ABC version); 45 (NBC version); 5 (1984 version); 63 (total)

Production
- Executive producer: Ernest D. Glucksman
- Producer: Perry Cross
- Production locations: El Capitan Theatre, 1735 N. Vine Street, Hollywood (ABC version)
- Running time: 120 minutes (ABC version); 60 minutes (NBC version); 60 minutes (syndicated version)

Original release
- Network: ABC
- Release: September 21 – December 21, 1963
- Network: NBC
- Release: September 12, 1967 – May 27, 1969
- Network: Syndication
- Release: June 11 – June 15, 1984

The Jerry Lewis Show is the name of several separate but similar American variety, talk and comedy programs starring comedian Jerry Lewis that aired non-consecutively between 1963 and 1984. The original version of the series aired on ABC from September 21, 1963 – December 21, 1963. A second series of the same name aired on NBC from September 12, 1967 – May 27, 1969. A late-night talk show of the same name aired in first-run syndication for one week in June 1984.

== Show origins ==
=== Martin and Lewis ===
Before The Jerry Lewis Show premiered in 1963, Lewis made several films and television appearances, notably as host on The Colgate Comedy Hour, with vocalist Dean Martin as the duo of "Martin and Lewis", first formed in July 1946. In 1956, after 17 films, a radio series, 29 Colgate shows and many night club appearances, they parted ways bitterly. Both Martin and Lewis continued as successful, but separate superstars. Between 1957 and 1962, Lewis headlined several well received solo specials for the NBC and ABC networks. "The Jerry Lewis Show" was the comedian's first foray into weekly television. Lewis had been a substitute host of The Tonight Show for two weeks after Jack Paar quit the show and before Johnny Carson took over, in 1962. Lewis' stint was successful, garnering huge ratings for the time period and a bidding war between the networks for his services as a talk show host. ABC gave him everything he asked for, including two hours live every Saturday night.

=== Renovation of the El Capitan ===
In 1963, the American Broadcasting Company (ABC), purchased the Hollywood and Vine Street Theatre, also known as the El Capitan Theatre (not to be confused with the present-day El Capitan Theatre on Hollywood Blvd.). The theater had been used in previous years for broadcasting radio shows for the Mutual Broadcasting System and for NBC television shows. ABC decided to renovate the theater so to be used for several ABC television shows. The entire theater was renovated at a cost of $400,000.

=== Promotion of Elton Rule ===
The same year of the renovation, ABC decided to promote Elton Rule to head of the network. Rule had previously worked as general manager of programming for ABC's Los Angeles affiliate KABC. Rule and other executives at ABC hired comedian Jerry Lewis to do a show for the network and videotape it at the newly renovated theater.

== ABC version ==
The first version of The Jerry Lewis Show premiered on Saturday September 21, 1963 on ABC. Before the series premiere, ABC gave Lewis $4.5 million to renovate the stage even after the $400,000 renovation done to the whole theater just months before. That was also part of the contract used to get Lewis to do the show. The other, main part of the contract, had Lewis agree to 40 live episodes for the network in exchange for $8 million, making Lewis, at the time, the highest paid television performer in history. The first episode, broadcast live, became a disaster as most of the new equipment failed, making a shambles of the proceedings. The opening night served as an omen; Lewis remained unable to find his footing as a 2-hour live talk show host during the ensuing weeks.

=== JFK assassination and cancellation ===
On November 22, 1963, President John F. Kennedy was assassinated while riding in a motorcade in Dallas, Texas. Network news coverage of the assassination and the events that followed pre-empted all scheduled programing between the afternoon of the 22nd and the late evening of the 25th. All series, specials and sporting events were delayed, put on hiatus or cancelled. Episodes of competing series on CBS, The New Phil Silvers Show and Gunsmoke were delayed until January and April 1964, respectively. The NBC Saturday Night Movie was also delayed until January 1964. The Jerry Lewis Show scheduled for the 23rd was suspended and did not return until early December. Its final episode, the thirteenth of the promised forty, aired on December 21, 1963.

== NBC version ==
Director and producer Bob Finkel decided to revise The Jerry Lewis Show nearly four years after the original ABC version ended its run. A revision of the series premiered on NBC on September 12, 1967, with guest Barbara Eden.

NBC introduced the show in the Tuesday 8:00 pm time slot. Lewis was given access to the Osmond Brothers, featured musicians on the recently ended The Andy Williams Show, as regular performers. The 60 minute program continuously lost viewers at the half-hour point to The Red Skelton Show, ranked #7 on CBS and #28 rated It Takes a Thief on ABC. The following September as the series entered its second season, NBC decided to switch time slots with I Dream of Jeannie which starred Eden, but the 7:30 pm time slot was not successful either. Jeannie moved to Mondays and finished #26 in the Nielsen ratings, while Lewis lost his potential viewers to The Mod Squad on ABC. NBC cancelled the program, airing its last episode on May 27, 1969.

== 1984 talk show ==
Alan Thicke created his own late night talk show to compete against NBC's highly rated The Tonight Show Starring Johnny Carson. The series, entitled Thicke of the Night, was syndicated and only ran for one season before being crushed by Carson and cancelled in June 1984. Needing a replacement program, series distributor Metromedia gave Lewis an on-air tryout in Thicke's former slot. During the week of June 11, 1984, Lewis hosted The Jerry Lewis Show, with Charlie Callas as Lewis' announcer/sidekick. Metromedia decided not to go forward with the project after a one-week trial run that received withering reviews. Howard Rosenberg for the Los Angeles Times called the episodes "pitiful." Writing for The Washington Post, critic Tom Shales described the show in harsh terms, calling it "flabbergasting" and "hopelessly unfunny."

== Broadcast history ==
Season	Time
1963–64	Saturday at 9:30-11:30 PM on ABC
1967–68	Tuesday at 8:00-9:00 PM on NBC
1968–69	Tuesday at 7:30-8:30 PM on NBC

The syndicated version aired after the 11:00 local news.

== Ratings ==
Neither the ABC nor the NBC version of the series ever made it into the top 30.
