= The Legend of Lasseter =

1979 documentary by Lee Robinson

The Legend of Lasseter is a 1979 Australian documentary about Lasseter's Reef. It was produced by Lee Robinson and includes footage from his 1957 episode of High Adventure which he made with Lowell Thomas.
