= High Adventure (TV series) =

Television series

High Adventure with Lowell Thomas is an American TV summer series presented by Lowell Thomas. The series was shown on CBS from June 16, 1964, through September 15, 1964. It was seen on Tuesdays from 8 to 9 p.m. Eastern Time. This series was a collection of previously televised specials, which ran under the same title, and which had aired on CBS from 1957 to 1959.

Some episodes were made by the Australian producer Lee Robinson.

One of these was called "Australian Outback". It involved the search for the explorer Lasseter. Robinson claimed he found Lasseter's bones. He was charged with an offence by the government but charges were dropped.

Footage from this episode was later used in the 1979 documentary The Legend of Lasseter.

== Episodes ==
1. New Guinea (12 Nov 1957)
2. Top of the World (23 Dec. 1957)
3. Africa (22 Jan. 1958)
4. Tibet (25 Feb. 1958)
5. Australian Outback (24 Mar. 1958)
6. Tiger Hunt: India Assam (19 Apr. 1958)
7. Morocco (28 May 1958)
8. The Last Frontier (8 Oct. 1958) - Exploration of Alaskia
9. Mountains of the Moon (6 Dec. 1958) - Explored the Rwenzori Mountains in the Belgian Congo.
10. Danger Island (22 Jan. 1959) - "Unusual sights and sounds" of Madagascar.
11. The Sinbad Story (27 Mar. 1959) - Traveled from the Persian Gulf to Zanzibar on an old Arab dhow with use of old methods of navigation.

== Production ==
Thomas was the executive producer, Gil Ralston was the producer, and Milton Fruchtman was the executive director. General Motors sponsored the show at a cost of more than $200,000 per episode. It was broadcast as specials in several time slots, pre-empting "top hour shows".

== Critical response ==
A review of the premiere episode in The New York Times said that parts of it were "interesting and informative footage", while other parts formed "a rather primitive travelogue, superficial in its approach ..." It called the series a "sound idea" but added the hope that future episodes would contain "greater substance and depth".

The trade publication Billboard's review of the first episode said that it was designed for fans of action magazines, with little effort devoted to in-depth coverage. It said that some of the scenes were "neatly caught and striking". In contrast, it added, "much of the footage, brilliant when viewed in color on a big projection screen, looked small and ordinary in the usual black and white of TV". Commercials were called "truly outstanding".

A review of the final episode in The New York Times said, "The 3,500-mile voyage made a fascinating finale" for the series. The review called Thomas's commentary "commendably informative" and said that the episode had "no obvious staging of incidents, such as have marked other shows in the series."
