= The Bing Crosby Show (1964 TV series) =

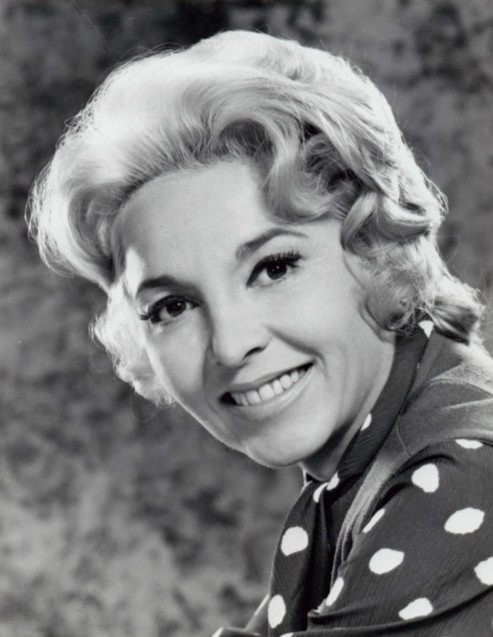
- Beverly Garland
- Genre: Sitcom
- Directed by: James Sheldon
- Starring: Bing Crosby; Beverly Garland; Carol Faylen; Diane Sherry; Frank McHugh
- Theme music composer: Sammy Cahn; Jimmy Van Heusen
- Opening theme: "There's More to Life Than Just Living"
- Ending theme: "It All Adds Up"
- Country of origin: United States
- No. of seasons: 1
- No. of episodes: 28

Production
- Producer: Steve Gethers
- Running time: 25 minutes
- Production company: Bing Crosby Productions

Original release
- Network: ABC
- Release: September 14, 1964 – April 19, 1965

The Bing Crosby Show is a 28-episode sitcom television program starring crooner, film actor and businessman Bing Crosby and actress Beverly Garland as a married couple, Bing and Ellie Collins, rearing two teenaged daughters during the early 1960s. In the format, Crosby portrayed a former entertainer turned architectural designer with a penchant for singing, and each episode usually contained at least one song. Produced by Crosby's own company, affiliated with Desilu Studios and subsequently CBS Paramount Television, the series aired on ABC from September 14, 1964, to April 19, 1965. Rebroadcasts continued until June 14.

The roles of the daughters Janice and Joyce Collins were played by Carol Faylen and Diane Sherry, respectively. Top Warner Bros. character actor Frank McHugh appeared as Willie Walters, the Collins's live-in handyman. Pamela Austin appeared twice on the program, as Clarissa Roberts.

This was one of the few times Crosby portrayed a married man, having often portrayed bachelors, widowers, divorcees, or priests. (Note: The Star Maker was one film in which he was married. He also portrayed a married man in the films Dixie and Blue Skies but there were problems in the relationships.)

Guest stars included Herbert Anderson, Frankie Avalon, Jack Benny, Jimmy Boyd, Macdonald Carey, Vikki Carr, his son Gary Crosby, Dennis Day, Roger Ewing, Glenda Farrell, Joan Fontaine, Kathy Garver, George Gobel, Kathryn Grant (Crosby's second wife, also known as Kathryn Crosby), Pat Harrington, Jr., Phil Harris, Charles Lane, Nobu McCarthy, Gary Morton, Ken Murray, Lloyd Nolan, Ruth Roman, and James Shigeta.

The Bing Crosby Show, main sponsor was Ford Motor Company's Lincoln-Mercury division, other sponsors included Lever Brothers, Mennen, Pepto-Bismol and Gillette. It was aired at 9:30 pm. Eastern on Mondays. The series faced competition on CBS from the sitcom Many Happy Returns, and on NBC, Crosby faced the second half of the popular The Andy Williams Show, which alternated with a Jonathan Winters variety show, The Jonathan Winters Show.

== Cast ==
- Bing Crosby....Bing Collins
- Beverly Garland....Ellie Collins
- Carol Faylen....Janice Collins
- Diane Sherry....Joyce Collins
- Frank McHugh....Willie Walters

== Episode list ==
Episode #	Episode title	Original airdate	Directed by	Written by	Episode Summary
1-1	"A Fine Romance" (pilot)	September 14, 1964	James Sheldon	Dan Beaumont	A remark by Janice leads to a night of adventure for Bing and Ellie and they attempt to recall their courtship days.
1–2	"Exactly Like Who?"	September 21, 1964	James Sheldon	Tom August & Helen August (aka Alfred Lewis Levitt & Helen Levitt)	Bing's daughter brings home a fast-talking songwriter who hopes to use Bing and Ellie to promote one of his new songs.
1–3	"A Bit of Fresh Danish"	September 28, 1964	James Sheldon	Bill O'Hallaren	A Danish sociologist offers some sophisticated ideas on the role of women.
1–4	"The Green Couch"	October 5, 1964	James Sheldon	Jack Sher	Bing is rousted out of bed to vouch for Ellie and his friend Willie after they get arrested.
1–5	"Hoop Shots"	October 12, 1964	James Sheldon	Steve Gethers	Bing and Ellie try to break up a romance between their daughter and a basketball player (Jimmy Boyd).
1–6	"Flashback"	October 19, 1964	James Sheldon	Steve Gethers	A look back at how Bing and Willie made the effort to enter vaudeville after getting out of the Army.
1–7	"The Education of Bing Collins"	October 26, 1964	James Sheldon	Jerome Ross	Joyce develops a crush on a teacher who Bing baits with questions about obscure events.
1–8	"The Dominant Male"	November 9, 1964	James Sheldon	Irving Gaynor Neiman	Bing and Joyce's date (Gary Crosby) offer clear evidence of their independence.
1–9	"The Importance of Bea 'n' Willie"	November 16, 1964	James Sheldon	Bill O'Hallaren	Willie gets a crush on a lumberman's daughter, with the entire family working together to promote the romance.
1–10	"The Liberated Woman"	November 23, 1964	James Sheldon	Irving Gaynor Neiman	Bing's Aunt Lulu (Glenda Farrell) helps install theatrical ambitions in Ellie.
1–11	"Genius at Work"	November 30, 1964	James Sheldon	Mayo Simon	An eccentric math wizard annoys the Collins while he's staying with them, but he gets sidetracked when Janice presents him with an intriguing math problem.
1–12	"The Yadwin Report"	December 7, 1964	James Sheldon	Stan Cutler	Joyce's latest boyfriend determines that the Collins marriage is doomed.
1–13	"Janice and Me on a Saturday Spent With Random Inputs No. 1"	December 14, 1964	James Sheldon	Loring Mandel	An exponent of electronic computer music finds an ally in Janice and an opponent in Bing.
1–14	"The Christmas Show"	December 21, 1964	James Sheldon	Jack Sher	Bing and the cast gather around the piano and sing Christmas carols.
1–15	"The Soft Life"	January 11, 1965	James Sheldon	Jack Sher	Bing and Ellie have different ideas about vacations, with each side then trying to prove their way is best.
1–16	"Bugged By the Love Bugs"	January 18, 1965	James Sheldon	Bill Morrow	Bing becomes a pariah in the family after they learn that he refused free tickets to see a rock group, The Love Bugs.
1–17	"Are Parents People?"	January 25, 1965	James Sheldon	Jack Sher	Bing and Ellie are reluctant to approve Joyce's trip to Mexico.
1–18	"That's the Way the Suki Yakies"	February 1, 1965	James Sheldon	Dan Beaumont	Bing and Ellie are guest of a Japanese couple (James Shigeta and Nobu McCarthy) and are impressed by the wife's deference to her husband.
1–19	"The Gifted Child"	February 8, 1965	James Sheldon	Russell Beggs	Janice is sent by her school to a psychiatrist to determine the extent of her precocity.
1–20	"The Image"	February 15, 1965	James Sheldon	Jack Sher	After Ellie calls in a decorator (Kathryn Crosby) and hires a PR man (Pat Harrington, Jr.), Bing heads to a nearby hotel owned, where the owner George Gobel thinks he's a bum.
1–21	"The Keefers Come Calling"	February 22, 1965	James Sheldon	Stanley Charles & Bill O'Hallaren	A pair of newlyweds (Frankie Avalon and Vicki Carr) have a habit of wearing the wrong costumes at parties.
1–22	"Operation Man Save"	March 1, 1965	James Sheldon	Bill O'Hallaren	Bing's super-efficient secretary (Joan Fontaine) annoys Ellie with her advice on everything and then meets her downtrodden husband (Dennis Day) who dealt with this for years.
1–23	"One For the Birds"	March 8, 1965	James Sheldon	Louis Kamp	A former vaudeville partner of Bing's (Phil Harris) arrives, but while staying in the garage, his deadbeat tendencies begin to annoy everyone.
1–24	"The Test"	March 22, 1965	James Sheldon	Jerome Ross	With Bing and Joyce getting set to take their driving exams, Ellie and Janice are tasked with instructing them for their respective driving tests.
1–25	"Moonlight Becomes You"	March 29, 1965	James Sheldon	Dan Beaumont	A college professor (Mel Torme) is moonlighting as a jazz pianist in a cellar café.
1–26	"What's A Buddy For?"	April 5, 1965	James Sheldon	Dan Beaumont	Bing and his insurance broker (Lloyd Nolan) are in competition to manage the local Little League baseball team.
1–27	"Conform, Conform, Whoever You Are"	April 12, 1965	James Sheldon	TBA	Bing and Ellie decided to reject the idea of celebrating the New Year and opt for a quiet celebration in a cabin—until they're discovered by the local rural population.
1–28	"Real Estate Venture"	April 19, 1965	James Sheldon	Jerome Ross	A high-powered real estate broker (Ruth Roman) tries to get Ellie to join her staff.
