= Cloak of Mystery =

- Genre: anthology
- Country of origin: United States
- Original language: English
- No. of seasons: 1

Production
- Running time: 60 mins.

Original release
- Network: NBC
- Release: 11 May – 8 August 1965

Cloak of Mystery is an American anthology television series. It was broadcast by NBC, recycling programs originally telecast on The Alcoa Theatre and The General Electric Theater.

== Sources ==
- Terrace, Vincent. Encyclopedia of Television Shows, 1925 through 2007. Jefferson, North Carolina: McFarland & Co., 2008.
