= 100 Grand (game show) =

1963 American game show

- Genre: Game show
- Created by: Bunny Handler; Robert Stivers
- Presented by: Jack Clark
- Country of origin: United States
- No. of episodes: 3

Production
- Producer: John Green
- Running time: 22–24 minutes
- Production company: Bob Stivers Productions

Original release
- Network: ABC
- Release: September 15 – September 29, 1963

100 Grand is an American game show hosted by Jack Clark. The series ran for three episodes, weekly on Sunday nights from September 15 to 29, 1963.

Broadcast on Sundays from 10 to 10:30 p.m. Eastern Time, 100 Grand was the first "big money" show to be broadcast after the quiz-show scandals in 1958.

== Game play ==
Two people, one an expert in a given field and the other an amateur interested in that field, were paired. Each contestant had to answer questions that the other had created. The questioning took place in an isolation booth. Before the session, two "authenticating judges" evaluated the questions to "be sure that they are absolutely correct according to several reference works and that they conform to the rules in a 199-page instruction book".

The player who stumped the professional for five weeks, had the show survived that long, would have had the privilege to answer five questions submitted by home viewers, and ended up with a grand total of $100,000 if successful.

On the premiere episode, amateurs defeated their professional counterparts with knowledge of content about the Civil War and opera. Each amateur won $10,000 "toward the potential jackpot." On the third show, both professionals stumped the amateurs, both of whom were awarded $1,000 savings bonds while the professionals each won $10,000.

== Episode status ==
The series is believed to be destroyed through wiping. A promotional video featuring the set and a contestant exists, traded among private collectors.

== Production ==
Bunny Handler and Robert Stivers created 100 Grand. John Green was the producer.

== Critical response ==
Reviewing the premiere episode of 100 Grand, Jack Gould wrote in The New York Times, "The old appeal [of quiz shows] is still there; 100 Grand probably will be a major hit of the season."

Chris Welles wrote in Life magazine: "What the producers should have done was junk the quiz and televise their backstage cloak-and-dagger preparations. It could have been the season's big hit."
