= Moment of Fear =

- Genre: anthology
- Country of origin: United States
- Original language: English
- No. of seasons: 1

Production
- Running time: 60 mins.

Original release
- Network: NBC

Moment of Fear is an American anthology television series.

It was broadcast by NBC, depicting people unexpectedly placed in peril. It debuted 1 July 1960 and ran eight new episodes through 9 September. It featured appearances by E. G. Marshall, Robert Redford, Inger Stevens, and Robert Lansing.

The show then began recycling programs originally telecast on other anthologies. These shows ran in two bunches: from 19 May through 15 September 1964 and from 25 May through 10 August 1965.

It is unrelated to the 1988 pilot, which was broadcast as the Tales from the Darkside episode "Attic Suite".

== Sources ==
- Terrace, Vincent. Encyclopedia of Television Shows, 1925 through 2007. Jefferson, North Carolina: McFarland & Co., 2008.
