= Mimi Hines =

Canadian singer and comedian (1933–2024)

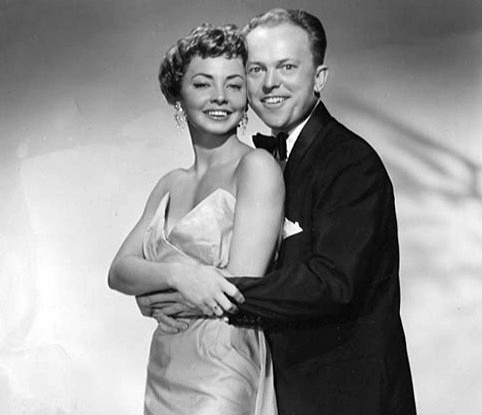
- Publicity photo of Hines and Phil Ford
- Born: Shirley Saborne; July 17, 1933; Vancouver, British Columbia, Canada
- Died: October 21, 2024 (aged 91); Las Vegas, Nevada, U.S.
- Occupations: Actress; singer; comedian
- Spouse: Phil Ford (m. 1954; div. 1972)

Mimi Hines (July 17, 1933 – October 21, 2024) was a Canadian actress, singer, and comedian, best known for her appearances on The Ed Sullivan Show, The Tonight Show and her work on Broadway. She succeeded Barbra Streisand in the original production of Funny Girl.

== Life and career ==
Hines was born in Vancouver, British Columbia, Canada on July 17, 1933, the daughter of Eugene Saborne and Lillian Hines. Her parents split when she was young, and she used her mother's surname. She worked for a time in Anchorage, Alaska, where she met comedian Phil Ford in 1952 while they were working at different night clubs. They married in 1954 and divorced in 1972. On August 28, 1958, she and Ford appeared on The Tonight Show for the first time. Hines sang "Till There Was You". In a later stand-up routine on The Tonight Show, she portrayed the NBC peacock. In 1959 she sang several of the numbers on the Juan García Esquivel-Ray Martin Christmas song collaboration, The Merriest of Christmas Pops (RCA Victor).

In 1964, Hines and Ford filmed a pilot episode for a potential sitcom, Mimi, that would have starred the two as owners of a resort hotel, but the series was not picked up for airing.

In 1965, she and Phil Ford starred in the obscure comedy Saturday Night Bath In Apple Valley, which was long-forgotten until Something Weird Video unearthed it and issued it on home video for the first time. It was directed by actor John Myhers and also starred Cliff Arquette and Joan Benedict.

On December 27, 1965, Hines succeeded Barbra Streisand on Broadway in Funny Girl, performing the role for eighteen months until the show's New York closing on July 1, 1967, after which she starred in touring companies of I Do! I Do! and The Prisoner of Second Avenue, as well as productions of Anything Goes, Never Too Late, The Pajama Game, The Unsinkable Molly Brown, No, No, Nanette and Sugar.

She played at Feinstein's at the Regency in New York City. She appeared with the Los Angeles Pops Orchestra and starred in national tours of Sugar Babies and Nite Club Confidential and on a recorded salute to Johnny Mercer called Mostly Mercer.

She toured the world for a year in the title role of Hello, Dolly! and starred in productions of A Majority of One and Can-Can in Florida and in revues featuring the songs of Alan and Marilyn Bergman, How Do You Keep the Music Playing? in Los Angeles, as well as the songs of Rodgers and Hart titled This Funny World at the Kennedy Center in Washington, D.C., and the songs of Jerry Herman at the Schoenberg Theatre in Los Angeles, California.

Hines appeared as Mrs. Latimer on the television program Frasier and returned to Broadway in 1994 for the Tommy Tune production of Grease, in which she appeared as Miss Lynch.

She also co-starred in the off-Broadway revival of Kander and Ebb's 70, Girls, 70, with Jane Powell, Charlotte Rae and Helen Gallagher, and was a guest in the final week of The Rosie O'Donnell Show. She performed for L.A.'s reprise, as Letitia Primrose in On The Twentieth Century, and in 2005 as Berthe in Pippin.

She co-starred in 2002 as Sister Mary Amnesia in the National Tour of the 20th Anniversary production of Nunsense, along with Kaye Ballard, Georgia Engel, Lee Meriwether, and Darlene Love. In 2007, Hines starred in the City Center Encores! production of Follies in New York City.

Hines died in her Las Vegas home on October 21, 2024, at age 91 from natural causes. A celebration of Mimi’s life, career, and marriage was held January 21, 2025, to coincide with the ceremony to unveil Hines and Ford's Star on the Palm Springs Walk of Stars.

== Filmography ==
=== Film ===
Year	Title	Role
1965	Saturday Night in Apple Valley	Mimi Madison
1982	Fake-Out	Female Camper

=== Television ===
Year	Title	Role	Notes
1964	Summer Playhouse	Mimi	Episode: Mimi
1971	Love, American Style	Jen Langfelder	Episode: Love and the Wig
1973	The Bobby Darin Show	Performer	Episode: Episode 2
1980	The Ugily Family	Verna Ugily	TV Movie
1999	Frasier	Mrs. Latimer	Episode: Taps at the Montana

=== Stage ===
Year	Title	Role	Notes
1962	Anything Goes	Reno Sweeney	Camden County Music Fair
1964	The Pajama Game	Gladys	Melody Top Theatre
1965	Bells are Ringing	Ella Peterson	Melody Top Theatre
1965	Funny Girl	Fanny Brice (Replacement)	Winter Garden Theatre, Broadway
1969	The Roar of the Greasepaint – The Smell of the Crowd	Cocky	Melody Top Theatre
1969	I Do! I Do!	Agnes	National Tour
1973	The Prisoner of Second Avenue	Edna Edison	National Tour
1975	The Unsinkable Molly Brown	Molly Tobin	Melody Top Theatre
1984	Sugar	Sweet Sue	The Palace Theater at Claridge Hotel
1986	No, No, Nanette	Pauline	The Palace Theater at Claridge Hotel
1988	Sugar Babies	The Prima Donna	National Tour
1989	No, No, Nanette	Pauline	National Tour
1990	Hello, Dolly!	Dolly Gallagher Levi	National Tour
1992	A Majority of One	Bertha Jacoby	Jan's International Room
1994	Grease	Miss Lynch (Replacement)	Eugene O'Neill Theatre, Broadway
1998	Hello, Dolly!	Dolly Gallagher Levi	Gateway Playhouse
2002	On the Twentieth Century	Letitia Primrose	Reprise Theatre Company
2002	Nunsense	Sister Mary Amnesia	National Tour
2005	Pippin	Berthe	Reprise Theatre Company
2006	Follies	Hattie Walker	New York City Center, Off-Broadway
2008	The Full Monty	Jeanette Burmeister	Maltz Jupiter Theatre

== Discography ==
- Mimi Hines Sings (Decca Records, 1966)
- Mimi Hines is a Happening (Decca Records, 1966)
- Mimi (Custom Fidelity Records)

=== Sidework ===
- The Merriest of Christmas Pops, singing on tracks with Ray Martin and his orchestra (RCA Victor, 1959)
