= Laughs for Sale =

- Genre: Comedy/variety
- Starring: Hal March (host)
- Country of origin: United States
- Original language: English
- No. of seasons: 1

Production
- Running time: 30 minutes

Original release
- Network: ABC
- Release: 1963

Laughs For Sale is an American television comedy/variety series. It ran one season.

Each episode provided an opportunity for a novice comedy writer to have material, including sketches, performed by a professional comedian. The material was then evaluated and offered to television producers, who could contact the show.

== Sources ==
- Terrace, Vincent. "Laughs for Sale" in Encyclopedia of Television Shows, 1925 through 2007. Jefferson, North Carolina: McFarland & Co., 2008.
