= The Danny Kaye Show =

American television variety program (1963–1967)

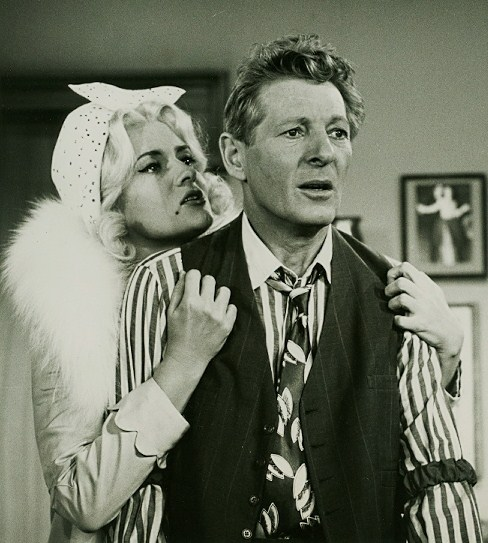
- Joyce Van Patten & Danny Kaye in The Danny Kaye Show (1965)
- Genre: Variety show
- Written by: Herbert Baker; Billy Barnes
- Presented by: Danny Kaye
- Theme music composer: Sylvia Fine; Sammy Cahn; Paul Weston; Nat Farber
- Opening theme: "Life Could Not Better Be"
- Ending theme: "Rendezvous In May"
- Composer: Paul Weston
- Country of origin: United States
- Original language: English
- No. of seasons: 4
- No. of episodes: 120

Production
- Camera setup: Multi-camera
- Running time: 45–48 minutes
- Production companies: Columbia Broadcasting System; Dena Pictures, Inc.

Original release
- Network: CBS
- Release: September 25, 1963 – June 28, 1967

The Danny Kaye Show is an American variety show, hosted by the stage and screen star Danny Kaye, which aired on Wednesday nights from September 25, 1963, to June 7, 1967, on the CBS television network. Directed by Robert Scheerer, it premiered in black-and-white. It switched to color broadcasts in the fall of 1965. At the time, Kaye was at the height of his popularity. He starred in a string of successful 1940s and 1950s musical comedy features, made numerous personal appearances at venues such as the London Palladium, and his rare selective visits to the small screen were considered major events. With his recent motion pictures considered disappointments, three triumphant early 1960s television specials led the way to this series. Prior to his film and television career, Kaye had made a name for himself with his own radio show, also titled The Danny Kaye Show. He made numerous guest appearances on other comedy and variety radio shows and headlined in several major Broadway musical revues throughout the 1940s.

== History ==
With the start of the 1963–64 television season at hand, James T. Aubrey, then president and board head of the CBS network, firmly believed he had scored a major coup by signing Judy Garland and Danny Kaye to headline their own variety shows. Kaye's program was originally slated to air on Sunday nights at 9:00 pm (EST) following The Ed Sullivan Show. However, that particular time slot was swiftly becoming known as a graveyard slot with NBC's top-rated western Bonanza also shown at that hour. CBS offered Kaye the Sunday 9:00 pm slot and he flatly refused. As a result, the network placed Kaye's show on Wednesday nights at 10:00 pm (replacing the alternating The United States Steel Hour and Armstrong Circle Theatre drama anthologies), and gave the Sunday 9:00 pm slot to Garland.

== Synopsis ==
The Danny Kaye Show followed the usual variety-show format, with an emphasis on comedy (Danny became the weekly equivalent of Sid Caesar and Carol Burnett), and was one of many variety shows that filled television schedules between 1948 and 1973, when the format had its heyday. Consultant Larry Gelbart worked with producer Perry Lafferty, a veteran of several recent Arthur Godfrey specials, in formulating the basic framework for the show months before it began production. They were also involved in the selection of talent with the program featuring many relative newcomers. Head writer Sheldon Keller worked with fellow Caesar's Hour veterans Larry Gelbart, Mel Tolkin and Gary Belkin along with Saul Ilson, Ernest Chambers, Paul Mazursky, Larry Tucker, Herbert Baker and Ron Friedman to write the first seasons according to IMDB.

Comedian Harvey Korman and actress Joyce Van Patten were featured performers on the show. Tony Charmoli, formerly of The Dinah Shore Chevy Show, who would later go on to direct many television specials himself, including Mikhail Baryshnikov's staging of The Nutcracker (1977), was the choreographer for the musical numbers. The program's orchestra was conducted by gifted arranger-composer Paul Weston, husband of vocalist and Capitol Records recording star Jo Stafford.

In the comedy elements of The Danny Kaye Show a recurring character was painfully shy guy "Jerome" (Kaye), getting into weekly scrapes through his shyness; the Jerome sketches were often introduced by Kaye doing a short monologue. As with many variety shows of the era, the final segment was "the sit-down", a less formal segment in which Kaye would have a light monologue or conversation summarizing the preceding program.

== Ratings and popularity ==
In the spring of 1964, The Danny Kaye Show ended its first season, winning an Emmy for best variety series though placing only 30th in the ratings. The Judy Garland Show was cancelled after its 26-week unsuccessful run against Bonanza. It did receive an Emmy nomination in the same category with Kaye.

== Recognition ==
In 1963, The Danny Kaye Show won a Peabody Award. The show was cited for having "added lustre and dimension to family-type comedy." The citation added, "Through the inimitable style, wit, and charm of a master comedian in multiple roles, American televiewers have been treated to a season of delightful entertainment."

The program won four Emmy Awards in 1964—for Outstanding Variety Music Or Comedy Series, Outstanding Performance in a Variety or Musical Program or Series (Danny Kaye), Outstanding Directing For A Variety Series (Robert Scheerer), and Outstanding Achievement In Electronic Camera Work. Additionally, it was nominated for the following Emmy Awards: Outstanding Variety Music Or Comedy Series (1966), Outstanding Writing For A Variety Series (1966), Special Classifications Of Individual Achievements (1966), Outstanding Individual Achievements in Entertainment Actors and Performers (1965), and Outstanding Art Direction For A Series (1964).

== Cancellation ==
After four years on CBS, The Danny Kaye Show ended its run in the spring of 1967. Increased competition from I Spy was a factor in the show's declining ratings that year. By this point, The Danny Kaye Show was in a time slot considered too late in the evening for variety shows of its type, but too family-friendly for late night (CBS did not program in the late-night slots at the time). The Steve Allen Comedy Hour replaced Kaye on the CBS lineup.

Show regular Harvey Korman quickly signed with another CBS variety series premiering in September - The Carol Burnett Show, where he remained as a cast member for 10 years. Tim Conway, a three-time Kaye guest star and also a future Burnett show series regular, first worked with Korman on a 1966 Kaye show. Following their years with Burnett, they continued as a duo in concert and television appearances until Korman's death in 2008. Danny Kaye remained a constant in the eyes of the public for the next two decades through his concert appearances, television work in both comical and highly praised dramatic roles, and as a tireless fundraiser for charities including UNICEF in which he spearheaded as an ambassador-at-large until his death in March 1987.

== Home releases ==
On November 20, 2012, a "Christmas with Danny Kaye" DVD was released featuring two unedited holiday-themed episodes. Included are a 1963 hour with Nat King Cole and Mary Tyler Moore, a 1966 color show with Peggy Lee and Wayne Newton, and bonus material furnished by his daughter, Dena Kaye.

On October 7, 2014, MVD home video released a Best of the Danny Kaye Show compilation on DVD. It contained six complete unedited episodes. Guests on these programs include Jack Benny, Gene Kelly, Art Carney, Harry Belafonte, Liza Minnelli, and Ella Fitzgerald. On October 16, 2015, an additional six-program collection was issued entitled Danny Kaye: Legends. Guests in this second volume include Lucille Ball, Tony Bennett, Shirley Jones, Louis Armstrong, George Burns, and Liberace.

== Syndication ==
On June 26, 2017, 50 years following its cancellation, selected unedited videotapes of The Danny Kaye Show returned to broadcast television on the Jewish Life Television network. The program was seen on weekday afternoons and Thursday evenings for the next 18 months; JLTV dropped the program at the end of 2018. INSP also aired the 1966 Christmas episode as part of a series of "Christmas Classics" variety show Christmas episodes on Christmas Eve and Christmas Day 2017.
