= Tell It to the Camera =

- Genre: Comedy
- Created by: Allen Funt
- Starring: Red Rowe (host)
- Country of origin: United States
- Original language: English
- No. of seasons: 1
- No. of episodes: 13

Production
- Running time: 30 minutes
- Production companies: Allen A. Funt Productions, Inc.

Original release
- Network: CBS
- Release: 11 January – 31 May 1962

Tell It to the Camera is an American television comedy series. It ran one season.

A variation on Candid Camera, the show had people expressing opinions directly to a camera.

== Sources ==
- Terrace, Vincent. "Tell It to the Camera" in Encyclopedia of Television Shows, 1925 through 2007. Jefferson, North Carolina: McFarland & Co., 2008.
