= The Edie Adams Show =

- Genre: Variety
- Starring: Edie Adams; Don Chastain; Peter Hanley; Dick Shawn
- Country of origin: United States
- Original language: English
- No. of seasons: 3
- No. of episodes: 21

Production
- Camera setup: Multi-camera
- Running time: 30 min.

Original release
- Network: ABC
- Release: September 26, 1963 – March 19, 1964

The Edie Adams Show (also Here's Edie ) is an American variety television show that ran on ABC from September 16, 1963, until March 19, 1964. Its time slot was Thursdays from 10 to 10:30 p.m. Eastern time.

Edie Adams starred in the show. Regular performers were Don Chastain, Peter Hanley, the Paul Godkin Dancers, and the Randy Rayburn Singers. The Peter Matz Orchestra provided the music.

On September 19, 1963, Adams and Sid Caesar appeared together in a one-hour program on ABC. Thereafter, Caesar's and Adams's programs alternated in the 10 p.m. Thursday time slot.

== List of guest stars ==
Note: only the first appearance by the guest star is listed.

=== (1963–1964) ===
- Zsa Zsa Gabor
- Peter Falk
- Bob Hope
- Louis Nye
- Sid Caesar
- Duke Ellington
- Eddie Fisher
- Buddy Hackett
- Sammy Davis Jr.
- Dan Rowan
- Bobby Darin
- Nancy Wilson
- Johnny Mathis
- Soupy Sales
- Dick Martin
- Pat Fontaine
- Al Hirt
- Allan Sherman
- Count Basie
- André Previn
- Charlie Brill
