= Arrest and Trial =

American legal drama

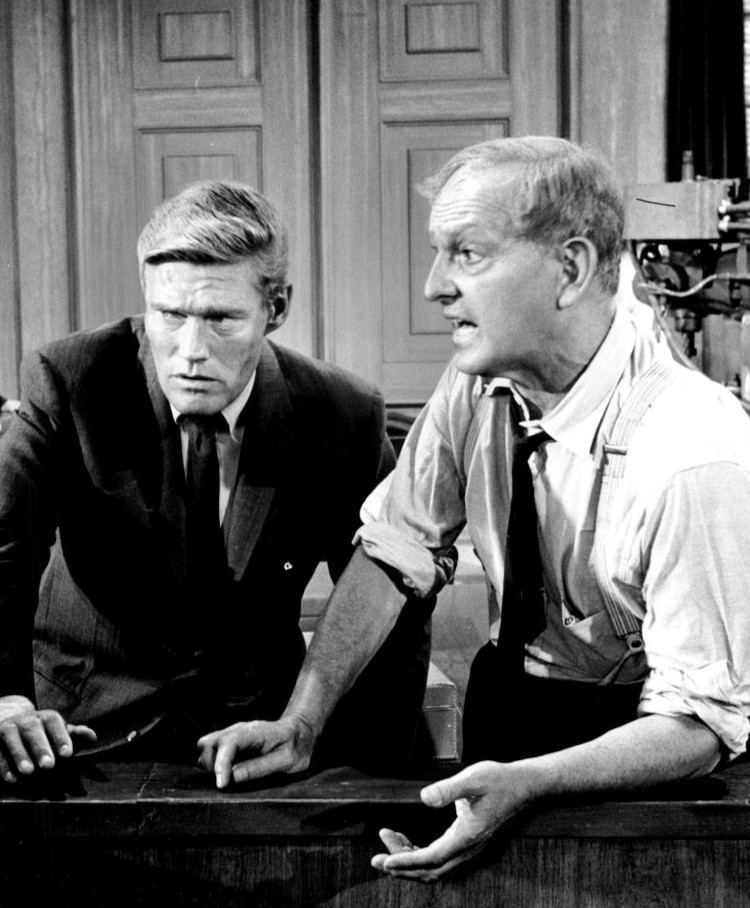
- Chuck Connors as John Egan and guest star Joseph Schildkraut as his client
- Genre: Crime/legal drama
- Starring: Ben Gazzara; Roger Perry; Chuck Connors; John Larch
- Theme music composer: Bronisław Kaper
- Composer: Franz Waxman
- Country of origin: United States
- Original language: English
- No. of seasons: 1
- No. of episodes: 30

Production
- Executive producer: Frank P. Rosenberg
- Producers: Arthur H. Nadel; Frank P. Rosenberg; Charles Russell
- Camera setup: Single-camera
- Running time: 90 mins.
- Production company: Universal Television

Original release
- Network: ABC
- Release: September 15, 1963 – September 6, 1964

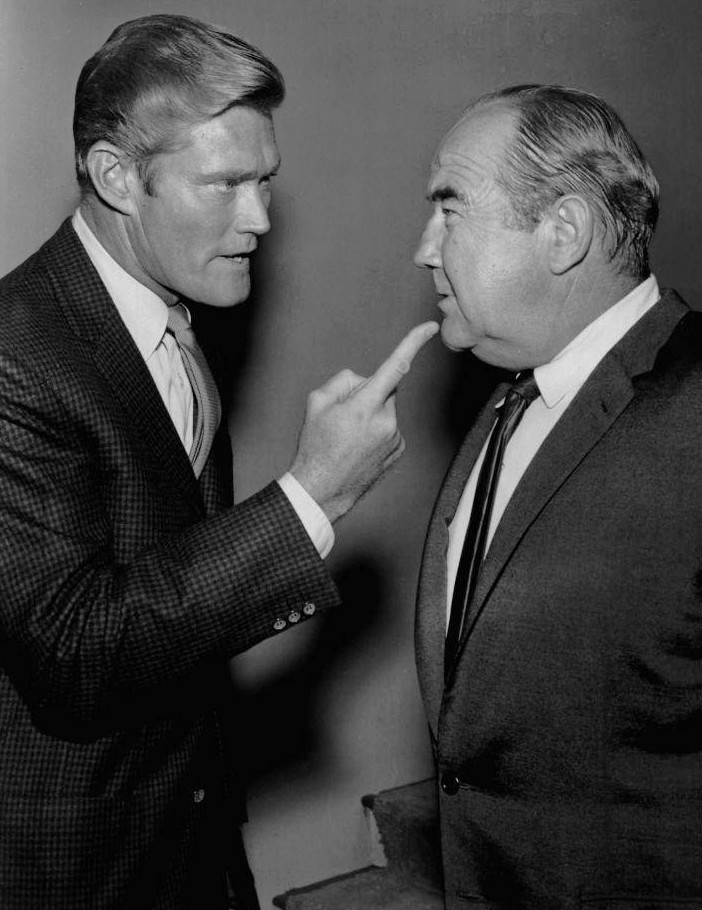
Chuck Connors and guest star Broderick Crawford (1963)

Arrest and Trial is a 90-minute American crime/legal drama series that ran during the 1963–1964 season on ABC, airing Sundays from 8:30-10 pm Eastern.

== Overview ==
The majority of episodes consists of two segments. Set in Los Angeles, the first part ("The Arrest") followed Detective Sergeants Nick Anderson (Ben Gazzara) and Dan Kirby (Roger Perry) of the Los Angeles Police Department as they tracked down and captured a criminal. The apprehended suspect was then defended in the second part ("The Trial") by criminal attorney John Egan (Chuck Connors), who was often up against Deputy District Attorney Jerry Miller (John Larch) and his assistant, Barry Pine (John Kerr, who later became an actual lawyer).

Gazzara agreed to play the role of Anderson only after extracting a promise from the producer that scripts would avoid stereotypical depictions of police officers.

In a 1963 TV Guide interview, Gazzara described his portrayal of Anderson: "I'm supposed to be a thinking man's cop. I'm a serious student of human behavior, more concerned with what creates the criminal than how to punish him. In other words, I'm not the kind of cop who asks, 'Where were you the night of April 13th?' It's my job to show that there is room for passion and intellectualism and personal display even within a policeman."

Arrest and Trial debuted on September 15, 1963. Its last telecast was on April 19, 1964, with reruns continuing until September 6, 1964. On April 24, 1964, it became the first American import to be broadcast on the UK's BBC2.

The same premise was adopted decades later by a more financially successful series, Law & Order, although the second half trial portion is focused on the prosecutorial side for that series, rather than the defense.

== Cast ==
- Ben Gazzara as Detective Sgt. Nick Anderson
- Chuck Connors as Attorney John Egan
- Roger Perry as Detective Sgt. Dan Kirby
- John Kerr as Barry Pine
- John Larch as Deputy D.A. Jerry Miller
- Joe Higgins as Jake Shakespeare

== Episodes ==
No.	Title	Directed by	Written by	Original release date
1	"Call It a Lifetime"	John Brahm	Herb Meadow	September 15, 1963
A truck driver in pursuit of cargo thieves fatally drives off the road a motorcycle policeman he had previously threatened.
2	"Isn't It a Lovely View"	Jack Smight	Don Brinkley (based on a story by David Friedkin and Morton Fine)	September 22, 1963
A man is stabbed on a bench outside an amusement park, unraveling a dark tale of industrial espionage and blackmail. A disabled woman who spends hours looking at the surroundings from a nearby building à la Rear Window claims she did not see anything... or did she?
3	"Tears from a Silver Dipper"	Arthur H. Nadel (also producer)	Sy Salkowitz	September 29, 1963
A soldier of Mexican ethnicity is accused of theft and murder against a backdrop of prejudice.
4	"A Shield is for Hiding Behind"	David Lowell Rich (also producer)	John McGreevey	October 6, 1963
Sgt. Anderson kills in self-defense a gang member suspected of murdering a policeman, but is put on trial for second-degree murder. Only the gang member's kid brother knows the truth, but he can't bring himself to tarnish the idealized image of his sibling in the eyes of his parents.
5	"My Name is Martin Burnham"	Ralph Senensky	Larry Cohen	October 13, 1963
A construction worker is brought in for questioning about assaults on women in his neighborhood. Although a victim directly exonerates him, the experience leaves him shaken. Incapable of returning home to face his family, he attempts to commit suicide by jumping from the skyscraper under construction where he used to work; but it is the foreman - responsible for firing him - who struggled to stop him who falls down the building. He is put on trial for first-degree murder, where he is determined to secure the death penalty for himself.
6	"A Flame in the Dark"	Arthur H. Nadel	Richard Fielder	October 20, 1963
7	"Whose Little Girl Are You?"	Jack Smight	Paul Mason and Kenneth M. Rosen (based on a story by Rosen)	October 27, 1963
8	"The Witnesses"	Alex March	Max Ehrlich	November 3, 1963
9	"Inquest Into a Bleeding Heart"	David Lowell Rich	Antony Ellis	November 10, 1963
10	"The Quality of Justice"	Sydney Pollack	Howard Rodman	November 17, 1963
11	"We May Be Better Strangers"	David Lowell Rich	Halsted Welles	December 1, 1963
12	"Journey into Darkness"	Jack Smight	Alfred Brenner	December 8, 1963
13	"Some Weeks Are All Mondays"	Lewis Allen	Teleplay by Barry Trivers Story by Bill Ballinger and Barry Trivers	December 15, 1963
14	"Run, Little Man, Run"	Richard Irving	Herb Meadow	December 22, 1963
15	"Funny Man with a Monkey"	Ralph Senensky	Jerome Ross	January 5, 1964
16	"Signals of an Ancient Flame"	Earl Bellamy	Teleplay by Donald Brinkley Story by Herbert A. Spiro	January 12, 1964
17	"Onward and Upward"	Herman Hoffman	Mark Rodgers	January 19, 1964
18	"An Echo of Conscience"	Lewis Milestone	Teleplay by William Woolfolk and Franklin Barton Story by William Woolfolk	January 26, 1964
19	"Somewhat Lower Than the Angels"	William Claxton	Robert Crean	February 2, 1964
20	"People in Glass Houses"	Alan Crosland, Jr.	Antony Ellis	February 9, 1964
21	"The Best There Is"	Leon Benson	Herb Meadow, Richard Levinson & William Link	February 16, 1964
22	"A Roll of the Dice"	David Lowell Rich	Abel Kandel	February 23, 1964
23	"The Black Flower"	Earl Bellamy	Don Brinkley	March 1, 1964
24	"A Circle of Strangers"	Lewis Allen	Franklin Barton	March 8, 1964
25	"Modus Operandi"	David Lowell Rich	Jerome D. Ross and Don Brinkley	March 15, 1964
26	"Tigers Are for Jungles"	Bernard Girald	George Kirgo	March 22, 1964
27	"The Revenge of the Worm"	Charles S. Dubin	Ben Maddow	March 29, 1964
28	"He Ran for His Life"	Elliot Silverstein	Teleplay by Don Brinkley Story by Mark Rodgers	April 5, 1964
29	"Those Which Love Has Made"	Alex March	Mann Rubin	April 12, 1964
30	"Birds of a Feather"	Robert Butler	John McGreevey	April 19, 1964

== Guest stars ==
- Nick Adams
- Martin Balsam
- Richard Basehart
- Richard Conte
- Broderick Crawford
- Francis De Sales
- Robert Duvall
- Bill Erwin
- Peter Fonda
- Anne Francis
- Billy Gray
- Joey Heatherton
- Charlene Holt
- Dennis Hopper
- Kim Hunter
- Jack Klugman
- Robert Knapp
- Dayton Lummis
- James MacArthur
- Roddy McDowall
- Barbara Nichols
- Michael Parks
- Madlyn Rhue
- Chris Robinson
- Mickey Rooney
- Cosmo Sardo
- Telly Savalas
- Joseph Schildkraut
- George Segal
- William Shatner
- Martin Sheen
- Everett Sloane
- Harold J. Stone
- Barbara Stuart
- Barry Sullivan
- Beverly Washburn
- Robert Webber
- James Whitmore

== Awards ==
Arrest and Trial earned four Emmy nominations in 1964. Two were for Martine Bartlett and Anjanette Comer for Outstanding Performance in a Supporting Role by an Actress, one was for Roddy McDowall for Outstanding Performance in a Supporting Role by an Actor, and the other was for Danny Landres, Milton Shifman and Richard Wray for Outstanding Achievement in Film Editing for Television.

== Home media ==
On November 22, 2011, Timeless Media Group released Arrest and Trial- The Complete Series on DVD in Region 1. The 10-disc set features all 30 episodes of the series.

== See also ==
- Dragnet (1951–59) – NBC drama series (produced by Jack Webb) that followed the Arrest and Trial format.
- The D.A. (1971–72) – short-lived NBC drama series (produced by Jack Webb) that followed the Arrest and Trial format, and is also owned by NBC Universal.
- Law & Order (1990–2010, 2022-) – NBC drama series (produced by Dick Wolf) that also followed the Arrest and Trial format, and is also owned by NBC Universal.
- Arrest & Trial (2000) – syndicated docudrama series also produced by Wolf
