= Phil Ford (comedian) =

American musician and comedian (1919–2005)

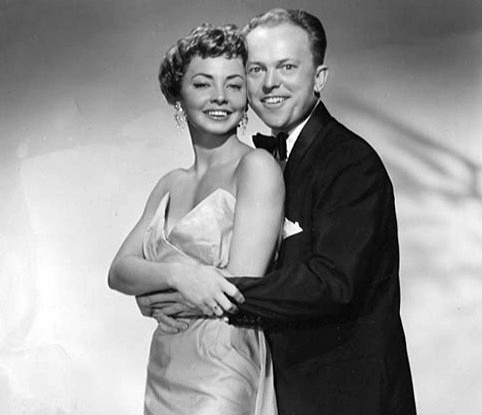
- Publicity photo of Hines and Ford.
- Born: June 21, 1919; San Francisco, California, U.S.
- Died: June 15, 2005 (aged 85); Las Vegas, Nevada, U.S.
- Occupation(s): Comedian, musician, vaudeville
- Spouse: Mimi Hines (m. 1954; div. 1972)

Phil Ford (June 21, 1919 – June 15, 2005) was an American vaudeville performer, musician, and comedian, whose career spanned over seven decades.

== Life and career ==
Ford was born in San Francisco, California, on June 21, 1919. He started in show business at the age of 12 and joined the Army during World War II.

Ford met his future wife, Canadian-born singer and dancer Mimi Hines, in 1952 and they married two years later.

In 1958, they appeared on Tonight Starring Jack Paar, which helped launch their careers. They also appeared as guests on the shows of Johnny Carson, Ed Sullivan, Dean Martin, Bobby Darin, Mike Douglas and Merv Griffin. They appeared in one film together, Saturday Night in Apple Valley, in 1965.

When Hines replaced Barbra Streisand as Fanny Brice in the hit musical Funny Girl in 1965, Ford was given the part of Eddie.

Hines and Ford divorced in 1972, but worked together professionally several times after their divorce.

Ford died of natural causes in Las Vegas, on June 15, 2005, at age 85.
