= The New Phil Silvers Show =

- Genre: Sitcom
- Starring: Phil Silvers
- Theme music composer: Harry Geller
- Country of origin: United States
- Original language: English
- No. of seasons: 1
- No. of episodes: 30

Production
- Producer: Rod Amateau
- Camera setup: Single-camera
- Running time: 30 minutes
- Production company: Gladasya Productions

Original release
- Network: CBS
- Release: September 28, 1963 – April 25, 1964

The New Phil Silvers Show is an American sitcom television series starring Phil Silvers which centers around a factory foreman who is always involved in get-rich-quick schemes. Original episodes aired from September 28, 1963, until April 25, 1964.

== Synopsis ==
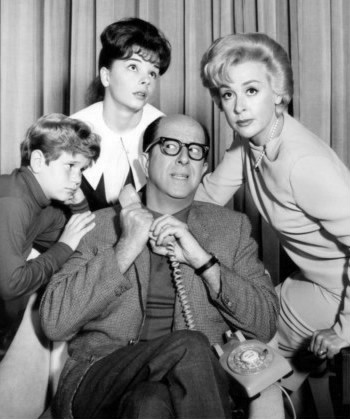
Phil Silvers with (left to right) Ronnie Dapo, Sandy Descher, and Elena Verdugo in a promotional photograph for The New Phil Silvers Show. Dapo, Descher, and Verdugo joined the cast in February 1964.

Harry Grafton is a factory foreman at Osborne Industries, a company in Los Angeles, California, which manufactures a constantly changing line of items. Trying to earn as much as possible while doing as little as possible, Harry is manipulative and a conman, and is always trying to beat the system. He makes money off his fellow employees by running the Osborne Industries coffee cart service and through his ownership of the company′s vending machines. From his office at the factory, he also secretly operates his own company, Grafton Enterprises, through which he habitually pursues scams and get-rich-quick schemes which never seem to work out for him. Harry has to get around his boss, Mr. Brink, to pursue his schemes, and often enlists the much-suffering workers on the factory floor in his efforts to fulfill them. His plans usually end in disaster.

In February 1964, Harry moves in with his widowed sister Audrey and her two children, Susan and Andy. Harry's family issues then also begin to play an increasing part in his misadventures.

== Cast ==
- Phil Silvers as Harry Grafton
- Stafford Repp as Brink
- Herbie Faye as Waluska
- Bert Convy as Roxy (pilot episode only)
- Pat Renella as Roxy (except pilot episode)
- Jim Shane as Lester
- Douglass Dumbrille as Mr. Osborne
- Steve Mitchell as Fred Starkey
- Bob Williams as Bob
- Buddy Lester as Nick
- Norm Grabowski as Grabowski
- Elaine Gardner as Louise
- Elena Verdugo as Audrey (1964)
- Sandy Descher as Susan (1964)
- Ronnie Dapo as Andy (1964)

== Production ==
Phil Silvers had a successful four-season run from 1955 to 1959 portraying Sergeant Ernie Bilko in The Phil Silvers Show. Four years after that show ended, The New Phil Silvers Show represented his attempt after a four-season absence from series television to reincarnate the successful Bilko character in the guise of Harry Grafton, with Silvers playing essentially the same character, albeit as a civilian factory foreman rather than a United States Army sergeant. Where Bilko had been popular, however, the Harry Grafton character turned viewers off: While Bilko had a soft spot, Harry was dishonest and manipulative through and through, and while Bilko was an underpaid, underdog sergeant trying to swindle faceless and implacable things like the United States Government and the U.S. Army just to make a little extra money, Harry had a good-paying job but still refused to do an honest day's work for a day's pay, and his scams and schemes involved exploiting and cheating blue-collar workers who were trying to make an honest living on the factory floor.

With The New Phil Silvers Show struggling in the ratings and after receiving many complaints about the show's premise and the Harry Grafton character′s lack of appeal, CBS moved The New Phil Silvers Show to a later time partway through November 1963. When that did not improve ratings, the show began a transition to a new premise as a domestic comedy in February 1964, adding Harry's family to the show in the eighteenth episode and beginning a process of gradually shifting the show's focus to Harry's domestic life, with him as a father figure to his niece and nephew. The shift came too late to save the show.

Rod Amateau produced the show, and Harry Geller wrote its theme music. Silvers' wife, Evelyn Patrick, appeared on the show in the role of Mr Osborne's niece. Silvers's old friend Herbie Faye, who had mentored Silvers in comedy in 1932, played Waluska.

== Broadcast history ==
The New Phil Silvers Show premiered on September 28, 1963, and initially aired on Saturdays at 8:30 p.m. Partway through November 1963, it moved to 9:30 p.m. on Saturdays, where it remained for the rest of its run. CBS cancelled it after only one season, and its last original episode aired on April 25, 1964.

After the show ended, NBC rebroadcast seven episodes of The New Phil Silvers Show as prime-time reruns during its normal time slot, four in May 1964 and three in June 1964. The last prime-time rerun aired on June 27, 1964.

In the United Kingdom, ITV broadcast The New Phil Silvers Show during 1964.

== Episodes ==
No.	Title	Directed by	Written by	Original release date
1	"Man, It's Like Progress"	Rod Amateau	Unknown	September 28, 1963
Against Harry′s wishes, Osborne Industries introduces a computer system that disrupts his department. He can't con the computer, and he has to figure out a way to outsmart it. Joan Shawley guest-stars.
2	"The Great Forklift Contest"	Rod Amateau	Unknown	October 5, 1963
Harry can't get anyone to bet against Lester in a forklift contest, so to encourage them to bet against Lester he decides to fix the contest to stack the odds against Lester — and ends up blowing up the Osborne Industries research laboratory.
3	"Birthday Boy"	Rod Amateau	Unknown	October 12, 1963
Harry wants everyone at the factory to know that his birthday is coming up and even plans a surprise birthday party for himself — with results he did not expect. Ron Sumner, Marlyn Mason, Henry Scott, and Bobs Watson guest-star.
4	"The Tortoise and the Harry"	Rod Amateau	Unknown	October 19, 1963
While organizing a turtle race at the factory for the employees to bet on, Harry meets a beautiful woman named Della — who he thinks might be the right woman for him. Evelyn Patrick guest-stars.
5	"Harry Today, Gone Tomorrow"	Rod Amateau	Unknown	October 26, 1963
The pilot episode for the series. Tired of Harry's moneymaking schemes, Brink tries to transfer him to another factory so that he will be someone else′s problem. Max Showalter, Hal Taggart, and Henry Scott guest-star. This was the only episode in which Bert Convy, rather than Pat Renella, portrayed Roxy.
6	"The Little Old Gluemaker, Me!"	David Davis	Bud Nye & Ed Jurist	November 2, 1963
After Otto Shafmeister, the janitor at the factory, invents a special type of glue, Harry thinks he can make a fortune by marketing its secret formula. Ludwig Stossel, Celia Lovsky, and Eric Morris guest-star.
7	"Triple Indemnity"	Rod Amateau	Unknown	November 9, 1963
Harry schemes to sell his coworkers at the factory a new insurance plan he has set up that protects them if they lose their paychecks.
8	"A Funny Thing Happened to Me on the Way to the Coffee Break"	Rod Amateau	Unknown	November 16, 1963
When Mr. Osborne asks for suggestions on how the factory can streamline its operation and cut costs, Brink suggests they start by closing Harry's department.
9	"Harry Who?"	Rod Amateau	Unknown	November 30, 1963
Harry feels threatened when Nick does too good a job filling in for him while he is on vacation — leaving him crushed that the men did not notice he had been away and wondering if he will be able to keep his job.
10	"Las Vegas Was My Mother's Maiden Name"	Rod Amateau	Unknown	December 7, 1963
A Las Vegas hotel mistakes Harry for comedian Phil Silvers and treats him as a celebrity. Milton Frome, Vickie Lockwood, Jimmy Murphy, and Florence Halop guest-star.
11	"The Son of Pygmalion"	Rod Amateau	Unknown	December 14, 1963
A beautiful but brainless woman, Mildred Flitterman, asks Harry to transform her into "a lady" — like Eliza Doolittle in My Fair Lady. Hope Holiday, Eleanor Audley, and Richard Lupino guest-star.
12	"Have I Got a Boy For You"	Rod Amateau	Unknown	December 21, 1963
Waluska is attracted to one of the women at the factory, but she is not attracted back — so Harry decides to help Waluska win her affections by giving him a new image. Helene Winston and Lennie Bremen guest-star.
13	"Who Do Voodoo? Harry Do!"	Rod Amateau	Unknown	December 28, 1963
After a society girl snubs Harry while he is visiting Trinidad, Harry hears that black magic can make him irresistible to women — and then tries to out-witch a witch doctor who has placed a hex on him. Bette Treadville, Barbara Shelley, and Burt Mustin guest-star.
14	"Stop the Factory, I Wanna Get Off"	Guy Scarpitta	Unknown	January 4, 1964
Harry finds out that a worker at the factory is planning to destroy his ex-fiancée's wedding, and he ends up having to use every trick he knows to keep the wedding from being called off. Leo de Lyon, Carole Cook, Joseph Hamilton, Steven Condit, Gene O'Donnell, and John Indrisano guest-star.
15	"Beauty and the Least"	Rod Amateau	Unknown	January 11, 1964
Harry decides to turn a plain woman into a beauty-contest winner. Dodo Denney and Joan Staley guest-star.
16	"75 1/2 Trombones"	Unknown	Unknown	January 18, 1964
Harry runs a raffle, and Fred is excited when he wins it. But Fred's excitement turns to anger and he decides to expose Harry's fraudulent schemes when he discovers that his prize is a U.S. Army tank — and it is on Okinawa. Frank London guest-stars.
17	"My Son, the Governor"	Thomas Montgomery	Unknown	January 25, 1964
To make extra money, Harry is manufacturing television snack tables as a side business, and he gets in big trouble when some of them are mixed up at the plant with a shipment of parts destined for the U.S. Army.
18	"Leave It to Harry"	Al Lewis	Unknown	February 1, 1964
Harry gains a home life when he moves in with his widowed sister Audrey, her daughter Susan, and her son Andy. When Audrey goes on vacation, she leaves Harry in charge of the children — and his skills at parenting and housecleaning chores quickly come into question. Elena Verdugo, Sandy Descher, and Ronnie Dapo join the cast as regulars, and Elvia Allman, Frank Nelson, and Florida Friebus guest-star.
19	"Smile, Harry, You're on Candid Camera"	Al Lewis	Unknown	February 8, 1964
Harry spots Candid Camera host Allen Funt in a supermarket and looks around for a hidden camera — but he is determined not to do anything that will make him look foolish on television. Allen Funt, Rosemary Day, Richard Clair, Joseph Hamilton, Joseph Boland, and Yvonne Peattie guest-star.
20	"Pay the Two Dollars"	Al Lewis	Unknown	February 15, 1964
Harry gets a $2.00 parking ticket and is determined not to pay it. He tries to get it fixed — and ends up paying $50.00. Alan Hale Jr. and Maggie Magennis guest-star.
21	"Harry, the Good Neighbor"	David Davis	Unknown	February 22, 1964
When Harry overhears an argument between his newlywed neighbors, he interferes by trying to patch things up between them — but things do not go as he hoped. Charles Dodds and Anne Whitfield guest-star.
22	"Cyrano DeGrafton"	Unknown	Unknown	February 29, 1964
Harry's shy friend Lester asks Harry to help him win the love of nurse Betty Wagner. Unbeknownst to Lester, Harry becomes infatuated with her himself. Lyn Edgington guest-stars.
23	"Take Her, She's Tall"	Rod Amateau	Unknown	March 7, 1964
Harry sets up a blind date for the girl-shy Andy — but Andy refuses to accept it.
24	"Will the Real Harry Grafton Please Stand Up?"	Rod Amateau	Ben Starr	March 14, 1964
Competing with Fred for the title of "Foreman of the Year" from a national magazine — and desperate to win and get his picture on the magazine′s cover — Harry stages a series of incidents at the factory in an effort to impress Elaine Hampton, a journalist from the magazine. Joyce Jameson and Grazia Narciso guest-star.
25	"Auntie Up"	David Davis	Bill Raynor & Myles Wilder	March 21, 1964
After Harry hires a sweet little old lady as a housekeeper, she turns the Grafton home into a gambling den. Harry responds by donning women's clothing and joining the game in an attempt to bilk her.
26	"Grafton′s the Name, Football′s My Game"	Thomas Montgomery	Unknown	March 28, 1964
Harry considers himself a football expert, so he decides to mentor the local football team′s coach by passing him a few secrets and teaching him a thing or two — and ends up getting himself arrested. Thomas McVey guest-stars.
27	"Keep Cool"	Unknown	Unknown	April 4, 1964
Harry and his men try to stay calm after they accidentally lock themselves in a walk-in freezer. Richard Jaeckel, Roland LaStarza, Sam Flint, and Henry Corden guest-star.
28	"Vanity, Thy Name Is Harry"	David Davis	David Davis	April 11, 1964
Harry decides to reverse the aging process by "thinking young" and wearing a toupée. Elaine Gardner and Mary Patton guest-star.
29	"How to Succeed in Business Without Crying"	Rod Amateau	Unknown	April 18, 1964
The plant's janitor, Charley Gilhooley, has led his mother to believe that he is the plant manager, and chaos ensues when she makes an unplanned — and unwelcome — visit. Paul Hampton and Blossom Rock guest-star.
30	"Moonlight and Dozes"	Thomas Montgomery	Unknown	April 25, 1964
The plant's night watchman, Magruder, is usually asleep on the job, and Harry relies on that so that he can rent the factory′s warehouse out at night without the company′s permission. When Magruder is threatened with losing his job, Harry has to figure out a way to keep him employed as the night watchman, so he concocts a scheme to stage a fake robbery on a night when he has rented the warehouse to a method acting class so that Magruder can be a hero. Burt Mustin, Bernie Kopell, and Eric Morris guest-star.
