= The Last Mercenary =

The Last Mercenary may refer to:

- The Last Mercenary (1968 film), a Spanish/West German/Italian modern-day Western
- The Last Mercenary (2021 film), a French action comedy film
