= Hazel Shermet =

American actress

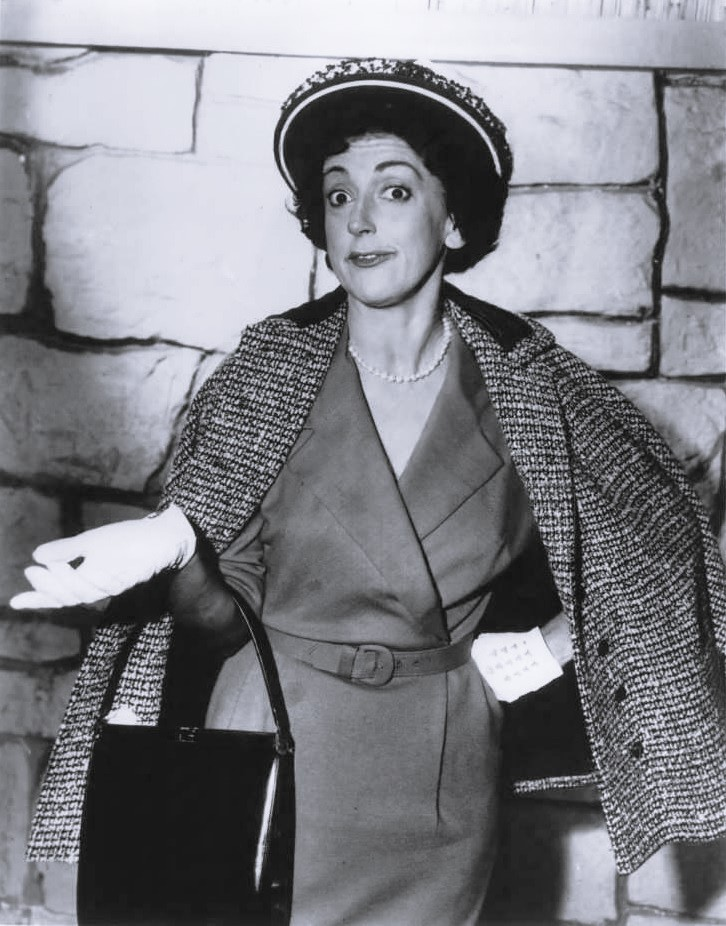
- Shermet in Hennesey (1962)
- Born: August 1, 1920; Philadelphia, Pennsylvania
- Died: October 27, 2016 (aged 96); Los Angeles, California
- Education: Carnegie Tech
- Occupations: Actor, comedian, singer
- Spouse: Larry Rhine (1950–2000; his death)
- Children: Two

Hazel Shermet (August 1, 1920 – October 27, 2016) was an American actress, comedian, and singer whose decades-long career spanned radio, television, film and theater, including Broadway. In addition to her live action-roles, Shermet also enjoyed a lengthy career as a voice-over and voice actor. She provided the voice of Henrietta Hippo for the entire 196-episode run of the syndicated children's show, New Zoo Revue, from 1972 until 1977.

Hazel Shermet also appeared in more than 100 television commercials, including ads for Borox, Charmin, Head & Shoulders, and Hunt's Tomato Paste. At one point in her career, Shermet appeared in seven national television commercials airing simultaneously across the United States, which earned her a cover photo from The Commercial Actor Magazine as the publication's "actress of the month."

== Biography ==
=== Early life and career ===
Shermet was born in Philadelphia, Pennsylvania, on August 1, 1920. Following her college graduation, she honed her acting skills at the Pasadena Playhouse. After that, she moved to New York City, where she began work with the Al Paul Lefton Co. agency as an advertising copywriter at the age of 19. Throughout her career, Shermet credited her early work in advertising, as well as her studies at Carnegie Tech (now Carnegie Mellon University in Pittsburgh), where she studied acting and graduated in 1941, for her longevity in the entertainment industry.

She appeared opposite Jack Albertson in the Broadway production of The Cradle Will Rock in 1947 when she was heard as an attendant's voice.

Her first major broadcast acting role came in March 1950 when she was cast as Miss Duffy in Duffy's Tavern, a long running radio situation comedy. She was the last actress in that role. Shermet relocated to Puerto Rico, where Duffy's Tavern was produced and recorded, for the role. There she met her future husband, writer Larry Rhine, who was the head writer of Duffy's Tavern at the time. The couple, who married in 1950 and had two children, remained together until Rhine's death in 2000. Rhine earned two Emmy nominations during his career as a television writer.

Following her work on Duffy's Tavern, Shermet returned to singing and comedy on radio, where she appeared alongside Fred Allen, Morey Amsterdam, Milton Berle, Henry Morgan, Kate Smith, and Henny Youngman. She was also a regular on Jack and Cliff (1948).

A pioneer of early television, Shermet starred in two shows which aired on WOR-TV in New York City, Songs You’ve Never Heard Before and Won't Want to Ever Hear Again, in which she performed tunes and songs requested by viewers.

=== Film and television ===
Shermet and Rhine moved to Los Angeles in the early 1950s, where she continued her radio career, in addition to roles in television and film. She was first cast in a 1954 television episode of Dragnet. She played Louise Cooper in the NBC-TV comedy Blondie (1957). In 1960–1961, she played Pam on the CBS comedy Pete and Gladys.

In 1964, Shermet had a notable role as Cousin Melancholia on an episode of The Addams Family. Her dozens of other television credits, spanning the 1950s to the 1980s, included The Beverly Hillbillies, My Favorite Martian (where her husband was a screenwriter), The Patty Duke Show, That Girl, I Dream of Jeannie, The Facts of Life, Gimme a Break! and Punky Brewster. She also had a recurring role as the voice of Mrs. Bailey on the 1980s animated series, Jem.

Shermet's film career began in the first credited but small role with 1954's A Star Is Born, as Jack Carson's secretary. Her other film roles include Rockabilly Baby (1957), Auntie Mame (1958), The Rise and Fall of Legs Diamond (1960), Gypsy (1962), Bye Bye Birdie (1963), Love at First Bite (1979), and Body Slam (1986).

Shermet was heard on the cartoon series The Amazing Chan and the Chan Clan (1972-1974) on CBS-TV. From 1972 to 1977, Shermet provided the voice of the Henrietta Hippo puppet for all 196-episodes of the children's television show, New Zoo Revue.

In a 2000 interview with the Archive of American Television, Hazel Shermet spoke of her prolific acting career, telling the interviewer Karen Herman, "I'm proud of the fact that I was able to work in all the mediums and raise two kids and be married to somebody that was working all the time. I hope people remember me as professional, as versatile and as somebody who loved every minute of it. I hope I gave a lot of joy," noting that "Acting for me is like eating for most people. When I'm 90 and the phone rings, I'll put my teeth in, hobble to the phone and see if it's my agent."

Shermet's husband, screenwriter and two-time Emmy Award nominee, Larry Rhine, died in 2000.

== Death ==
Shermet died from natural causes at her home in Los Angeles, California, on October 27, 2016, at the age of 96. She was survived by her two children: daughter, Vicki, and son, Robert Rhine, an actor and producer; as well as her granddaughter, Julie, an Emmy-nominated costume designer.

== Filmography ==
Film
Year	Title	Role	Notes
1954	Dragnet	Talent Agency Receptionist	Uncredited
1954	A Star Is Born	Libby's Secretary	
1957	Rockabilly Baby	Mrs. Hill	
1958	Auntie Mame	Macy's Customer	Uncredited
1960	The Rise and Fall of Legs Diamond	Mrs. Cassidy	Uncredited
1962	Gypsy	Stage Mother	Uncredited
1967	Bye Bye Birdie	Marge - Birdie's Secretary	Uncredited
1979	Love at First Bite	Mrs. Knockwurst (Lady in Elevator)	
1986	Body Slam	Miss Brooks	
