= The George Raft Story =

1961 film by Joseph M. Newman

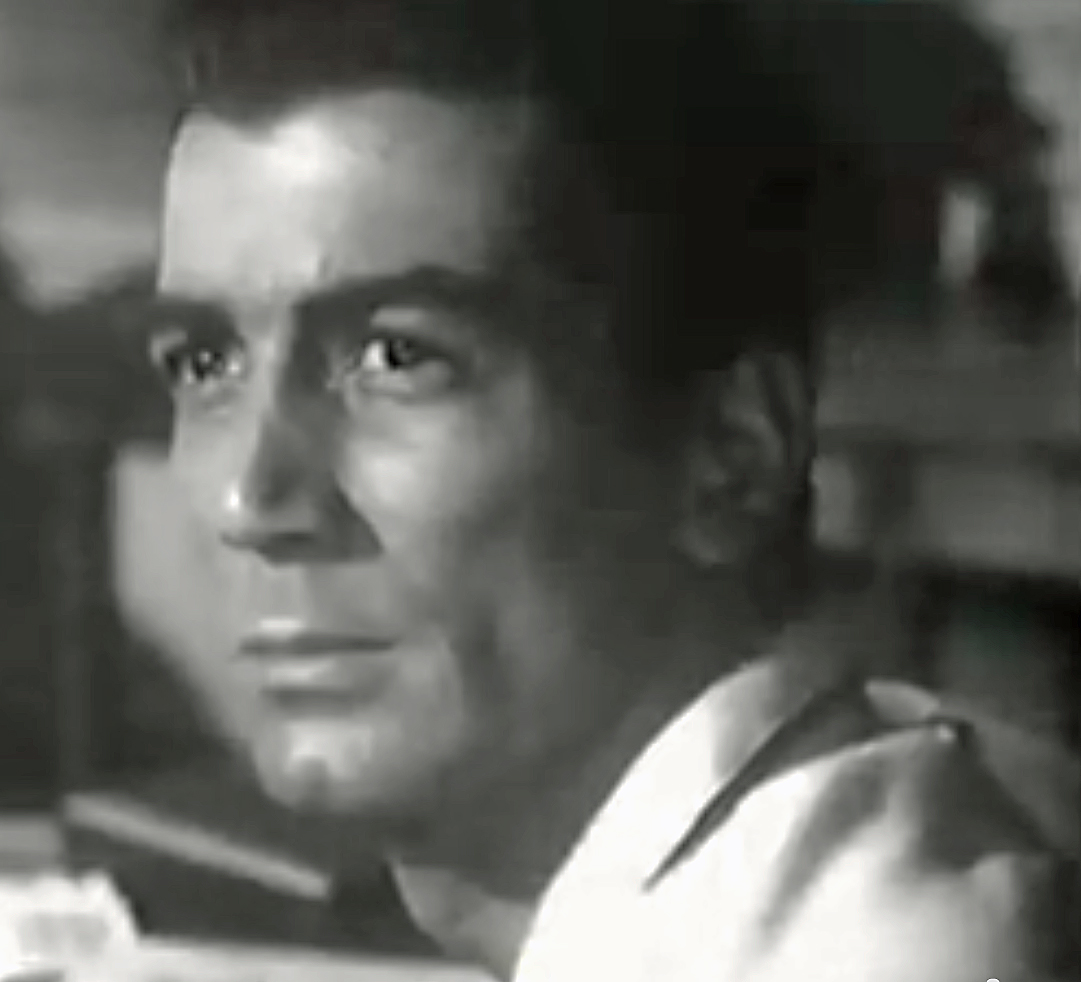
- Ray Danton in The George Raft Story
- Directed by: Joseph M. Newman
- Screenplay by: Crane Wilbur
- Produced by: Ben Schwalb
- Starring: Ray Danton; Jayne Mansfield; Julie London; Barrie Chase
- Cinematography: Carl E. Guthrie
- Edited by: George White
- Music by: Jeff Alexander
- Distributed by: Allied Artists
- Release date: November 1961; (Chicago)
- Running time: 106 minutes
- Country: United States
- Language: English
- Budget: $1.2 million

The George Raft Story is a 1961 American biographical film directed by Joseph M. Newman that stars Ray Danton as Hollywood film star George Raft. The picture was retitled Spin of a Coin for release in the United Kingdom, a reference to Raft's character's nickel-flipping trick in Scarface (1932), the film that launched his career as an actor known for portraying gangsters.

The film is a largely fictionalized version of Raft's turbulent life and career. Neville Brand appears briefly as Al Capone, recreating his role from the 1959 television series The Untouchables. Although other characters are fictional, Moxie is based on Raft's longtime friend and associate Mack Gray. Benjamin "Bugsy" Siegel is a major character. The film does not mention Raft's estranged wife Grace or early mob benefactor Owney Madden.

Raft and Gray had played themselves almost two decades earlier in a markedly different but equally fictionalized biographical film about Raft's early days as a dancer reluctantly involved with gangsters entitled Broadway (1942).

== Plot ==
George Raft works in New York as a dancer at the Dreamland Casino. He associates with gangsters and works at mob-controlled nightclubs. One night, he protects a cigarette girl from sexual harassment from a gangster, endangering his life.

Raft moves to Hollywood and begins his film career as an extra before being cast as a gangster in Scarface. Raft is frightened when Al Capone asks to meet him, but Capone reveals that he likes the film. At a party, Raft punches a manager and they become friends.

Raft becomes a major star and broadens his image by appearing in a 1934 musical film with dancing titled Bolero. Although the film is a hit, Raft begins demanding rewrites for future roles and declines gangster roles. He leaves his girlfriend for a Hollywood star with whom he has been conducting a love affair.

Raft has financial trouble with the IRS and his friend Benny "Bugsy" Siegel is killed. He is forced to sell his Hollywood mansion and move to a small apartment. He takes a job at a casino in Havana, but the casino closes when Fidel Castro takes over.

Back in Hollywood, Raft is offered to fix a fight by promoter Johnny Fuller but refuses. He accepts a role in Billy Wilder's 1959 film Some Like It Hot.

== Cast ==
- Ray Danton as George Raft
- Jayne Mansfield as Lisa Lang
- Julie London as Sheila Patton
- Barrie Chase as June Tyler
- Frank Gorshin as Moxie Cusack
- Barbara Nichols as Texas Guinan
- Brad Dexter as Benny 'Bugsy' Siegel
- Robert Strauss as Frenchie
- Herschel Bernardi as Sam
- Margo Moore as Ruth
- Neville Brand as Al Capone
- Joe De Santis as Frankie Donatella
- Jack Lambert as Jerry Fitzpatrick
- Jack Albertson as Milton
- John Bleifer as Mr. Raft

== Production ==
=== Development ===
In 1956 George Raft was interviewed by Dean Jennings for a series of articles on the actor's life that were published the following year in The Saturday Evening Post. Raft was unhappy with the pieces saying "They were shooting for sensationalism rather than my real life story." Nonetheless, the articles attracted interest from various Hollywood studios, and a number of studios considered making a film of Raft's life including Paramount and 20th Century Fox. Eventually film rights were bought by Steve Broidy of Allied Artists. Raft allegedly sold the story for $25,000 plus 10% of the profits. Jennings had an agreement with Raft where the writer was entitled to 25% of any film sale of the story.

Allied Artists announced the film in 1959 as part of a slate of projects including Streets of Montmartre with Lana Turner as Suzanne Valadon, The Purple Gang with Barry Sullivan, Teacher Was a Sexpot with Mamie Van Doren, Confessions of an English Opium Eater, Pay or Die with Ernest Borgnine as Joseph Petrosino and The Big Bankroll about Arnold Rothstein. Allied had enjoyed a big box office success with Al Capone and The George Raft Story was one of several crime related biopics it named as a follow up, others including Pay or Die, The Purple Gang and The Big Bankroll.

The film was announced again in 1960 with Ben Schwalb named as producer. Director Joseph Newman had directed Raft in I'll Get You for This (1951). Schwalb announced that filming would begin on October 7, 1960, but production was delayed until July 1961.

=== Casting ===
In the late 1950s Robert Evans was discussed as a possible Raft.

Eventually Ray Danton, Brad Dexter, Jayne Mansfield and Frank Gorshin were cast. The Las Vegas comedy team of Pepper Davis and Tony Reece was signed to play a support role. Danton, borrowed from Warner Bros., was given the role as Raft on the strength of his performance in The Rise and Fall of Legs Diamond. Danton said that he decided against performing "an impersonation of Raft ... I watched a lot of his old films and noticed a sort of strong suppressed hostility." Danton only met Raft once, and Raft told him: "We have to make careful they [the filmmakers] don't make this guy [Raft] into a heavy." Danton later said: "I thought it was a strange, obtuse thing to say."

Jayne Mansfield's character is based on Betty Grable.

Comedy duo Davis & Reese (Pepper Davis and Tony Reese) appear, performing their act, in one nightclub scene.

=== Lawsuits ===
In June 1961, Dean Jennings claimed that he had not received anything under his agreement with Raft from the sale of the articles in the Saturday Evening Post and announced his intention to bring legal action. The case settled out of court in 1963.

Relatives of Al Capone had sued Allied Artists for invasion of privacy over the film Al Capone and threatened to do the same for The George Raft Story, since Capone appearas as a character. This made some exhibitors nervous they might be sued if they showed The George Raft Story so Allied Artists indemnified theatre owners against any legal action. Ultimately the relatives of Capone lost their case over the film Al Capone.

== Release ==
The film was known in the UK as Spin of a Coin.

== Reception ==
In a contemporary review for The New York Times, critic Howard Thompson wrote: "'Nice guy, George Raft, according to 'The George Raft Story.' Misunderstood, too, claims this blithely glossy little biographical drama ... The criminal associations of Mr. Raft, before his tough, patent-leather personality made him famous in films, are known facts. Not long ago, the actor himself, who may be as nice a guy as they come, candidly filled in a brass-tacks account to a national magazine. So much for the record—his own."

Los Angeles Times critic John L. Scott called The George Raft Story "a vigorous but curious film play" and wrote: "It is rather strange that Crane Wilbur's screen play places more emphasis on its central figure's friendships for gangland figures than with his lengthy career as an entertainer. This tends to give observers a one-sided view of the star's life. What the man really feels inside never comes out—a seemingly never-ending fault of biographical film tales."
