= Johnny Puleo =

American musician and actor (1907–1983)

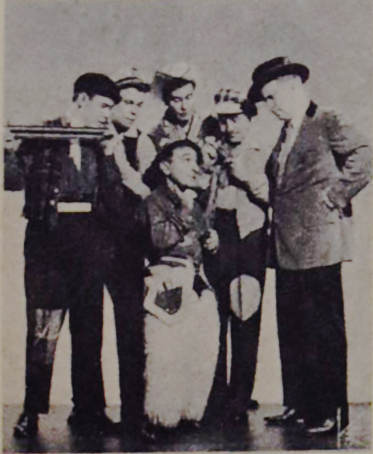
Johnny Puleo and His Harmonica Gang, from a 1965 flyer.

Johnny Puleo (October 7, 1907 – May 3, 1983) was an American musician and actor who specialized in playing the harmonica.

Born a dwarf (he stood 4 ft 6 in (1.37 m) as an adult) in Washington, D.C., he worked as a newspaper seller until being discovered at a contest in Boston held by bandleader Borrah Minevitch, of The Harmonica Rascals. Soon he joined a comedy variety act, during which time he learned the art of pantomime that contributed so much to his success. He then joined the Rascals, with whom he toured the world.

In 1941, following a strike with Minevitch, Johnny, as well as many other Minevitch Rascals, left the Rascals in attempt to start a different group. The entirety of the group had moved in with Johnny's parents, living and rehearsing in their basement. The group did not last long, as Minevitch threatened legal action and was able to acquire his players again.

Following Minevitch's death in 1955, Puleo formed his own band, The Harmonica Gang, to avoid conflict with the Paul Baron Rascals, which took over the original band name in 1956. The group had many albums on Audio Fidelity records starting in 1957, and even released a two record album with the Chimes Family. He also acted in several films, most notably Trapeze (1956). The Harmonica Gang appeared at top supper clubs throughout the USA, including the famous Latin Quarter in New York and Miami Beach, the Riviera in Las Vegas, Palmer House in Chicago, The Roosevelt in New Orleans, and Twin Coaches in Pittsburgh, as well as venues like the Moulin Rouge and London Palladium overseas.

Puleo and his five-member band released a series of high-energy light-pop LPs on Audio Fidelity Records. His first album was the first LP to be released in a single-tone-arm stereo format in 1957. More (at least seven) albums on the Audio Fidelity label followed well into the 1960s. One of his (and their) best performances is "Sabre Dance", which featured Dave Doucette on chromatic harmonica, which, along with several of their other tunes, is posted on YouTube. In this arrangement the group played the "B" section of the song in 4/4 time versus the original written 3/4 time.

Puleo died of a heart attack at Holy Cross Hospital in his native Washington, D.C., in 1983.

== Notable performances ==
Puleo performed in front of such notables as the Royal Command in England and the Presidents of the United States and France. In addition to his mastery of the harmonica, he was a past master of the art of pantomime and a dramatic actor of considerable ability. Puleo made numerous appearances on The Ed Sullivan Show, The Hollywood Palace, Milton Berle's Variety Show and Steve Allen Show.

Puleo was an early advocate for use of the zip code within the United States. In a mid 1960s TV commercial, he climbed up a small ladder and said, "Now remember, use your zip code," as he pointed to a letter going into the mailbox.

== Filmography ==
Year	Title	Role	Notes
1936	One in a Million	Himself	Uncredited
1938	Rascals	Harmonica Rascal	Uncredited
1942	Always in My Heart	Short Harmonica Rascal	Uncredited
1956	Trapeze	Max	
