= The Hollywood Palace =

American television variety series

- Opening logo from Don Rickles/Phyllis Diller episode
- Genre: Variety
- Directed by: Grey Lockwood
- Narrated by: Dick Tufeld; Ernie Anderson
- Country of origin: United States
- Original language: English
- No. of seasons: 7
- No. of episodes: 192

Production
- Executive producer: Nick Vanoff
- Producer: William O. Harbach
- Production location: Hollywood Playhouse near Hollywood and Vine in Hollywood
- Running time: 45–48 minutes
- Production companies: ABC; United Artists Television; Zodiac Enterprises

Original release
- Network: ABC
- Release: January 4, 1964 – February 7, 1970

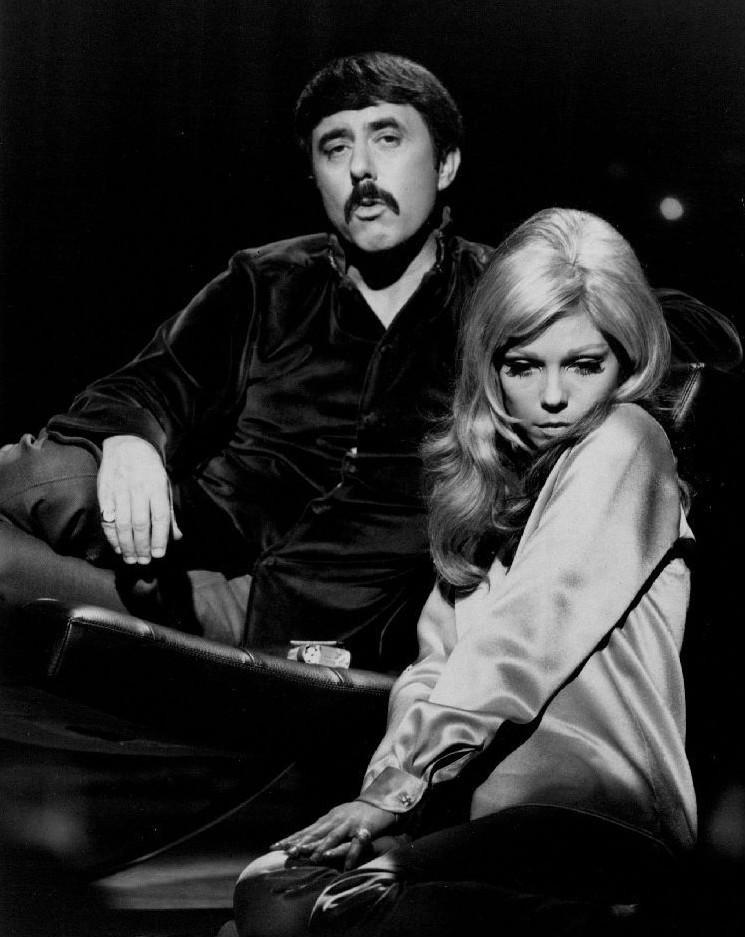
Lee Hazlewood and Nancy Sinatra, 1968

The Hollywood Palace was an hourlong American television variety show broadcast Saturday nights (except September 1967 to January 1968, when it aired on Tuesday nights) on ABC from January 4, 1964, to February 7, 1970. Titled The Saturday Night Hollywood Palace for its first few weeks, it began as a midseason replacement for The Jerry Lewis Show, another variety show, which lasted only three months.

It was staged in Hollywood at the former Hollywood Playhouse (where Lewis's series had originated, temporarily renamed "The Jerry Lewis Theater" from September through December 1963) on Vine Street, which was renamed the Hollywood Palace during its duration and subsequently renamed Avalon Hollywood. A little-known starlet, Raquel Welch, was cast during the first season as the "Billboard Girl", who placed the names of the acts on a placard (similar to that of a vaudeville house). The show's musical theme was a fast-paced instrumental rendition of "Put On a Happy Face" from the 1960 Broadway musical Bye Bye Birdie.

== Overview ==
Unlike similar variety programs such as The Ed Sullivan Show, the series featured a different guest host each week. Among the many performers and hosts were Bing Crosby (who hosted the series' first and final episodes and had the most appearances as guest host: 31 in all, including his family on several of the annual Christmas shows), Dean Martin, Liberace, Frank Sinatra, Milton Berle, Sammy Davis Jr., Sid Caesar, Peter Lawford, the Rolling Stones, Groucho Marx, Joan Crawford, Bette Davis, Tony Bennett, Judy Garland, Jimmy Durante, the Supremes, Ginger Rogers, Fred Astaire, the Temptations, Dusty Springfield, Diahann Carroll, Phyllis Diller, and Elizabeth Montgomery. (Martin's hosting was a bit ironic, given that the slot had been vacated by his ex-partner Jerry Lewis. Martin alluded to this in the March 7, 1964, episode, thanking Lewis for "building me this theater". He enjoyed the gig enough to subsequently agree to star in his own variety series, The Dean Martin Show, which premiered on NBC in 1965 and ran until 1974.)

Les Brown and his Orchestra served as house band for the first season, with Mitchell Ayres and his Orchestra taking over until Ayres accidental death in 1969. Joe Lipman served as the show's primary orchestrator and arranger (46 episodes). The off-screen announcer for each program was Dick Tufeld. Grey Lockwood served as director for the show's entire run.

The opening set framing the host established a unique show opening with Jim Trittipo's stage set. After the opening, the set transformed into a second set, with set pieces either splitting apart or turning around and additional flying set pieces dropping in or flying out on camera, as well as scenic theatrical magic transforming before the camera while each new act was introduced. This novelty was established as The Hollywood Palace's specialty. This opening transition broke the normal scheduled commercial time-slot breaks, with the commercial break occurring far into the show's first 15-minute segment.

A number of popular music performers got their start on the show; among them were the Rolling Stones, who made their first US television appearance on the June 6, 1964, episode, and the Jackson 5, who made their first national television appearance on the October 18, 1969, episode. The folk-rock group We Five performed their hit "You Were on My Mind" within a few weeks of its release in 1965. During their 1964 appearance, the Rolling Stones were repeatedly ridiculed, before and after their performance of Muddy Waters' "I Just Want To Make Love To You", by Martin. At the time, they were relatively unknown in the U.S., and a second song recorded in the same session, Buddy Holly's "Not Fade Away", was not shown until the second episode of the second season, hosted by Ed Wynn, that aired on September 26, 1964. The February 25, 1967, edition featured the American television debut of the Beatles' music videos for "Penny Lane" and "Strawberry Fields Forever", introduced by guest host Van Johnson.

The show, as well as all of ABC's Talmadge Main Lot programming, was televised in black and white until September 1965, when color telecasts began. The facility was the first color studio renovated by ABC Television on the West Coast, converted during The Hollywood Palace's summer hiatus. Sharing the studio, scheduling Sunday through Wednesday, The Lawrence Welk Show was moved to Vine Street to broadcast in color at Welk's request, but the Welk Orchestra had to be reduced to fit on the stage. Given the orchestra plan, Welk drew a pencil line on the right side of the plan, announcing, "lose them!"

The adjacent parking lot became an outdoor staging area for high-wire and trapeze performers, circus animal acts with elephants, lions, tigers, chimps, and performer acts that could not be booked on The Ed Sullivan Show. The producers could schedule Las Vegas and Reno casino performers, comedians, musicians, specialty acts by flying performers to Los Angeles via Burbank Airport for appearances on The Hollywood Palace. Exposure of the Knickerbocker Hotel's electric sign atop the rear building, behind the Palace Theater, was a unique advertisement shown in every parking lot act.

Like The Ed Sullivan Show on CBS, all of the episodes of The Hollywood Palace (save its final episode in 1970) were taped before a live audience; a laugh and applause track was also used for "sweetening" purposes. During the 1967 season, studies were made to convert the stage, which would have a swimming pool beneath a sliding stage floor that would cover the pool, with a third ice rink floor that could slide atop the stage floor. Storing these sliding floors required owning the property behind the theater building. The Knickerbocker Hotel was directly behind the building, but ABC could not purchase the hotel property from the Methodist Church, which had converted the hotel into a residential retirement facility. Moving the show to a Culver City soundstage was considered, but scuttled because of the expense. Vanoff later used this format concept for the 1980 NBC variety series The Big Show, using a soundstage on the Sunset Gower Studios lot, which included a three-ring stage, ice rink, swimming pool for aquatic staging, and an audience area.

For most of its run, with a lead-in of The Lawrence Welk Show at 8:30 pm, at 9:30, The Hollywood Palace enjoyed consistently respectable ratings, although it never made the top 30 programs. By the start of the 1969-1970 season (its seventh), the ratings had slipped, and ABC canceled the series in February 1970. Bing Crosby hosted the final episode, sans audience, which consisted of clips from previous shows.

== Compilation show ==
On December 16, 2004, a television special titled Christmas at the Hollywood Palace was broadcast on PBS. It included performances by Crosby and 15 clips from past Christmas shows of the series. It also included interviews with Bing's wife Kathryn Crosby, Bing's children Harry and Mary Crosby, and Hollywood Palace producer Bill Harbach.

== Awards ==
The Hollywood Palace won one Emmy out of eight nominations, for James Trittipo for art direction in 1966. The same year, it was nominated for a variety series, arranging (Joe Lipman), costume design (Ed Smith), and conducting (Mitchell Ayres). Ayres received another Emmy nomination for his work on the series in 1968, when two more nominations for the series went to Nick V. Giordano and Herb Weiss, both for individual achievement in electronic production.

== List of guest stars ==
=== 1964 ===
- Bing Crosby (guest host [first of 31 times], episode 1, January 4, 1964)
- Les Salvadori (five-member Italian clown troupe)
- André Tahon and Company (three puppeteers)
- Mickey Rooney and Bobby Van
- The Hardy Family (acrobats: father and three daughters)
- John Scott Trotter (the show's musical director)
- Gary Crosby
- Silvan
- Nancy Wilson
- Bob Newhart
- closing segment with Larri Thomas (DJ, the show's billboard girl), Bing Crosby and next week's guest host Bob Cummings (addressed by Bing via his birth name, Robert Orville Cummings)
- The Young Americans, joined at the end by Bing Crosby
- Bob Cummings (guest host, episode 2, January 11, 1964)
- Rosemary Clooney
- Dave King
- Anthony Newley
- Patachou
- Carl Reiner and Mel Brooks
- Les Carsonys
- The Volantes
- Larri Thomas (billboard girl)
- Hugh O'Brian (guest host, episode 3, January 18, 1964)
- Ginger Rogers
- Johnny Mathis
- Marty Ingels
- Joanie Sommers
- Les Charlivels acrobats
- Bertha the dancing elephant
- Johnny Puleo
- The André Tahon Puppets
- Larri Thomas (billboard girl)
- Ernest Borgnine (guest host, episode 4, January 25, 1964)
- Carl Ballantine and Joe Flynn
- Tony Bennett
- Eleanor Powell
- Miriam Makeba
- The Levee Singers
- Vikki Carr
- Davis and Reese (Pepper Davis and Tony Reese)
- Norbu gorilla act
- Larri Thomas (billboard girl)
- Donald O'Connor (guest host, episode 5, February 1, 1964)
- Mary Costa
- Buddy Greco
- Don Knotts
- Francis Brunn
- Colvin and Wilder (Jack Colvin and Yvonne Wilder)
- Pompoff Thedy clown family
- The Louis DaPron Dancers
- The Wellingtons
- Larri Thomas (billboard girl)
- Gig Young (guest host)
- Michael Bentine
- Dorothy Collins
- Buddy Hackett
- The Mills Brothers
- Yma Sumac
- The Berosinis
- The André Tahon Puppets
- Dale Robertson (guest host)
- Red Buttons
- Vic Damone
- Smothers Brothers
- Jane Morgan
- The Four Amigos
- Russ Lewis
- The Harrison Family or The Harris Nelson Family
- Szony and Claire
- The Half Brothers
- The Old Grey Mare
- Gene Kelly (guest host)
- Bill Dana
- Phil Ford and Mimi Hines
- Joey Heatherton
- Della Reese
- Dick Humphries and Alex Plaschheart
- The Womenfolk
- The Tangier brothers
- Anden's poodles
- Efrem Zimbalist Jr. (guest host)
- Louis Quinn
- Corbett Monica
- Albert Rix and his trained bears
- Szony and Claire
- Lewis and Christy
- Roy Rogers and Dale Evans, Trigger, and Sons of the Pioneers
- The Flying Wallendas
- Kate Smith
- Dean Martin (guest host [first of 2 times], episode 10, March 7, 1964)
- The Berosini Chimps
- Rola and Rolan (two-man balancing act)
- Jackie Mason
- Barrie Chase
- Ludwig Stossel
- Vikki Carr
- Leonard Barr
- Piccola Pupa (12-year-old Italian pop singer)
- Closing segment with Raquel Welch (Raquel, the billboard girl), Dean Martin and Groucho Marx (next week's guest host)
- Groucho Marx (guest host [first of 3 times], episode 11, March 14, 1964)
- Bertha the elephant (with trainer and two female assistants)
- Jennie Smith (singer, born November 13, 1938, in Burnwell, West Virginia)
- Lee Allen (comedian and dancer on roller skates)
- André Tahon (puppeteer; mouse puppets sing I Feel Pretty)
- Groucho's Dr. Hackenbush sketch with Dee Hartford (sister of Groucho's wife Eden Hartford) and eight dancing girls dressed as nurses
- José Greco (with dance partner)
- Morey Amsterdam and Rose Marie
- Gilbert Bécaud
- Closing segment with Raquel Welch (Raquel, the billboard girl), Groucho and Bertha the elephant
- Nat King Cole (guest host, episode 12, March 21, 1964)
- Paul Winchell and Jerry Mahoney with Winchell's wife, Nina Russell, dressed as a nurse, and Chris Quinn.
- The Amin Brothers (Egyptian acrobatic balancing act)
- Allen & Rossi (Marty Allen and Steve Rossi)
- The Merry Young Souls (Nat King Cole's six-men-and-six-women singing group)
- The Great Bruno (outdoor 90-foot-high balancing act)
- Diahann Carroll
- Ken Murray
- Closing segment with Nat King Cole singing spirituals with The Merry Young Souls followed by Raquel Welch (Raquel, the billboard girl) coming out with George Burns (next week's guest host)
- George Burns (guest host)
- Sergio Franchi
- The Lennon Sisters
- Patti Page
- Carl Reiner and Mel Brooks
- Mac Ronay
- The Dunhills
- Cyd Charisse and Tony Martin (guest hosts)
- The Collins Kids
- Mahalia Jackson
- Ferrante and Teicher
- Corbett Monica
- Gaylord and Holliday
- The Amandis
- The Three Bizzaros Brothers
- The Berosini chimps
- Donald O'Connor (guest host)
- Fran Jeffries
- Jack E. Leonard
- Rich Little
- Jerry Van Dyke
- Four Little Angels
- The Wellingtons
- The Frielanes
- Tarzan Zerbini
- Jimmy Durante (guest host)
- Jack Carter
- Liberace
- Piccola Pupa
- The Sylte Sisters
- Silvio Francesco
- Jack Colvin and Yvonne Wilder
- Otto and Maria
- The Hardy Family
- Ken Murray (guest host)
- Dan Rowan and Dick Martin
- Eddie Albert
- Charlie Callas
- Chad and Jeremy
- The Four Step Brothers
- Jane Morgan
- Louis Jourdan (guest host)
- Anna Maria Alberghetti
- The King Sisters
- John Bubbles
- Henny Youngman
- Russ Lewis
- Lewis and Christy
- Muriel Grossfeld and Abie Grossfeld
- Armando Vega
- Ron Barak
- Johnny Broadway
- Dale Robertson (guest host)
- Betty Hutton
- Carole Cook
- John Gary
- Paul Lynde
- The Womenfolk
- Davis and Reese
- Dave Parker
- Varel and Bailly & Les Chanteurs de Paris
- Kunio's Horse Fantasy
- The Bumpy Spectacular acrobats
- Fred MacMurray (guest host)
- Trini Lopez
- George Gobel
- Dorothy Collins
- Guy Marks
- Augie and Margo
- The Army "Old Guard" Fife and Drum Corps
- The Marine Pacific Drum and Bugle Corps
- The Air Force Flying Rifles drill team
- The Navy Starflights trampoline act
- Victor Borge (guest host)
- Louie Bellson
- Dennis Day
- Philly Joe Jones
- Shelly Manne
- Irv Cottler
- Caterina Valente
- Gaylord and Holliday
- Clifford Guest
- Les Tonellys
- André Tahon and Company (puppeteers)
- Phil Harris (guest host)
- Louis Armstrong
- Pete Barbutti
- Peter Gennaro
- Louis Nye
- Mary Costa
- The Jubilee Four
- The Piero Brothers
- Robert Baudy
- Gene Barry (guest host)
- Buster Keaton
- Wayne Newton
- Juliet Prowse
- Jack Carter
- Gloria Swanson
- Marilyn Michaels
- The Swingle Singers
- The Romano Brothers
- André Tahon and Company (puppeteers)
- Dean Martin (guest host)
- The women of SHARE
- Bertha the elephant and her daughter Tina
- The King Sisters and their daughters (including Tina Cole)
- Joey Forman
- The Rolling Stones
- Larry Grizwold
- Raquel Welch (billboard girl) with Donald O'Connor
- Debbie Reynolds (guest host)
- Buddy Hackett
- Liberace
- Rich Little
- Stan Getz
- Astrud Gilberto
- Arirang Korean ballet troupe (44 members)
- 9 gymnasts from the 1964 U.S. Olympic team
- Ed Wynn (guest host)
- Nicholas Brothers
- Eydie Gormé
- Los Panchos with 6 guitarists
- Jack Carter
- The Rolling Stones
- Linon
- Zizi Jeanmaire with La Revue Parisienne
- Rob Murray
- Maurice Chevalier (guest host)
- Dan Rowan and Dick Martin
- Tim Conway
- Jane Powell
- The Collins Kids
- Dave Parker
- André Tahon and Company (puppeteers)
- The Staneks
- Donald O'Connor (guest host)
- Sergio Franchi
- Shecky Greene
- Morgana King
- Dorothy Provine
- Marilyn Michaels
- The Haslevs
- Victor Julian
- Martin Granger and puppets
- Betty Grable (guest host)
- Dan Dailey
- Harry James
- Smothers Brothers
- Diahann Carroll
- Henny Youngman
- Les Surfs
- Buddy Ebsen (guest host)
- Willie Mays
- Jack Carter
- Jane Morgan
- Shani Wallis
- The Wiere Brothers
- The Mascotts
- Tony the Wonder Horse
- Gene Barry (guest host)
- Ben Blue
- Bette Davis
- Olivia de Havilland
- Carl Reiner and Mel Brooks
- Monique van Vooren
- The Back Porch Majority
- 1964 U.S. Olympic gold medal winners
- Yonely
- Victor Borge (guest host)
- Alice Faye
- Pat Morita
- Nancy Wilson
- Nicholas Brothers
- The Swingle Singers
- Rih Aruso (acrobatic bicyclist)
- DeMille
- Arthur Godfrey (guest host)
- Shelley Berman
- Dorothy Collins
- John Gary
- Gaylord and Holliday
- The Delrays
- Eva Vidos
- Dwight Moore and mongrels
- Tony Martin (guest host)
- Cyd Charisse
- Dino, Desi and Billy
- Jack E. Leonard
- Ted Lewis
- Johnny Puleo
- The Half Brothers
- Fred Roby
- Phil Harris (guest host)
- Ginger Rogers
- The McGuire Sisters
- Bill Dana
- Gary Crosby
- The Four Step Brothers
- The Jubilee Four
- Dwight Moore and mongrels
- The Merkys
- Burl Ives (guest host [first of 2 times], episode 36 [2.12], December 12, 1964)
- Ann Miller (accompanied by five male dancers) tap dances and sings "It Had Better Be Tonight"
- Rih Aruso (acrobatic bicyclist, "Viennese King of Balance")
- Pat Henry
- The Baranton Sisters (Régina and Yvonne, French foot juggling act)
- Anna Moffo (sings "Chacun le sait" from Daughter of the Regiment and [with Burl Ives] "Turn Around")
- Edgar Bergen and Charlie McCarthy with 18-year-old Candice Bergen
- Liana Stanek (trapeze performer from Vienna)
- Donald O'Connor (guest host)
- Louis Armstrong
- Charley Weaver
- Norm Crosby
- Jane Powell
- The Hanneford family
- Vienna Boys' Choir
- Van Johnson (guest host)
- Betty Grable
- Sergio Franchi
- Jackie Mason
- Paul Gilbert
- The Bal Caron Trio
- The Zeros
- The Jambaz
- Mimi Zerbini

=== 1965 ===
- Liberace (guest host, episode 39, January 9, 1965)
- The Getschys cycling family
- Dan Rowan and Dick Martin
- Shani Wallis
- Gene Baylos
- Page and Bray (Page and Bray French, dancers)
- Bertha and her daughter, Tina
- Edward G. Robinson
- Bing Crosby (guest host)
- Gene Barry
- George Burns
- Cyd Charisse and Tony Martin
- Jacques d'Amboise
- Catherine Mazzo
- Corbett Monica
- The Three Rebertes
- Leonardo (plate spinner)
- Bette Davis
- Buddy Ebsen
- Beverly Garland
- Phil Harris
- Liberace
- The King Sisters and their children
- Groucho Marx
- Frank McHugh
- Debbie Reynolds
- Ed Wynn
- Kate Smith (guest host)
- Trini Lopez
- Mort Sahl
- Ben Blue
- The Juan Carlos Copes dance troupe
- Stan Fisher (harmonicist)
- Desmond and Marks
- Karlini and Jupiter the dog
- Cyd Charisse (guest host)
- Tony Martin
- Jack Carter
- Kay Starr
- Alphonse Bergé
- Shaike Ophir
- The Cosmos (motorcycle aerialists)
- The Delrays
- David Janssen (guest host, episode 39, January 9, 1965)
- The Harlem Globetrotters
- Edie Adams
- Tim Conway
- Princess Tajana (Indian trapeze artist)
- Les Surfs
- Carl Reiner and Mel Brooks
- The Zeros (husband-wife knife-throwing act)
- Vic Damone
- George Burns (guest host)
- Rich Little
- Wayne Newton
- Connie Stevens
- The Goanas (trampoline)
- The Greenwood Country Singers
- Prasanna Rao (Indian shadowgraphy artist)
- The Zacchinis (human cannonballs)
- Bette Davis (guest host)
- Barrie Chase
- Eydie Gormé
- Bert Lahr
- Julius La Rosa
- Jan Murray
- Les Cinci
- Rob Murray
- The Nerveless Nocks
- Roy Rogers and Dale Evans (guest hosts)
- Trigger
- Sons of the Pioneers
- Shelley Berman
- Jan and Dean
- Billy De Wolfe
- Nicholas Brothers
- Ballet Folklórico de México
- The Murais (Japanese jugglers)
- Gino DeNotti (?)
- The Flying Armors
- Eddie Fisher (guest host)
- Connie Stevens
- Jack Carter
- Arirang ballet troupe
- Ben Wrigley
- The Kuban Cossacks
- Victor Borge (guest host)
- Rosemary Clooney
- Shecky Greene
- Kessler Twins
- The Two Freddies (trampoline acrobats)
- Russ Lewis
- Marco (sword balancer)
- Robert Goulet (guest host)
- Bill Cosby
- Bill Dana
- Carol Lawrence
- Les Surfs
- The Three Akeffs
- Eva Vidos
- Kay and her pets
- Tony Randall (guest host)
- Vikki Carr
- Nelson Eddy
- Gale Sherwood
- Pat Morita
- The Supremes
- Allan Sherman
- Gene LeBell "The Hangman"
- Victor the Great, a 450-pound Canadian brown bear
- "Fluffy", a lion
- The Marthys
- Gene "The Great" Mendez
- Dale Robertson (guest host)
- Tim Conway
- George Gobel
- Lisa Kirk
- Barbara McNair
- Gaylord and Holiday
- The Four Winds of Notre Dame
- The Hanneford Family
- The Morways
- Groucho Marx (guest host)
- Margaret Dumont
- Gordon and Sheila MacRae
- Miriam Makeba
- Melinda Marx
- Shecky Greene
- Lydia Torea and her dance troupe
- Don Saunders
- The Four Kents
- Pat Boone (guest host)
- Dorothy Collins
- Jack E. Leonard
- Ben Blue with his troupe
- Liliane Montevecchi
- The Cherokys
- The Steckles
- Louis Armstrong (guest host)
- Edward G. Robinson
- Diahann Carroll
- Jimmy Durante
- Dan Rowan and Dick Martin
- Ballet Folklórico de México
- Steve Lawrence (guest host)
- Mickey Rooney
- Bobby Van
- Jack Cole
- Jean Fenn
- Gene Baylos
- The Back Porch Majority
- Poogie Bell
- Alberto and Rosita
- The Gimma Brothers
- George Burns (guest host)
- Carl Reiner and Mel Brooks
- Jack Jones
- Mary Costa
- The Young Americans
- Cully Richards with pantomime troupe
- The Almiros
- The Flying Zacchinis
- Tennessee Ernie Ford (guest host)
- Ann Miller
- Jack Carter
- Edie Adams
- Santos
- The Gus Augsburg Monkeys
- The O'Keefe comedy divers with Rex Richards
- An unknown choir
- Bing Crosby (guest host)
- Caterina Valente
- Tim Conway
- Jack Burns and Avery Schreiber
- The Nitwits
- The Rudas
- The Black Theatre of Prague
- Bertha and her daughter, Tina
- Bing Crosby (guest host)
- Louis Armstrong
- Phil Harris
- The Young Americans
- Carl Ballantine
- Pat Woodell
- Fred Roby
- La Norma
- Sims' performing ponies
- Fred Astaire (guest host)
- Margot Fonteyn
- Rudolf Nureyev
- Paul Lynde with Carmen Phillips
- Jackie Mason
- We Five
- Jimmy Smith
- André Tahon and Company
- The Suns Family
- Joan Crawford (guest host)
- Jack Jones
- Marty Allen and Steve Rossi
- Joanie Sommers
- Godfrey Cambridge
- Lilly Yokoi
- The Rodos
- Stebbing's boxers
- Frank Sinatra (guest host)
- Count Basie
- Jack E. Leonard
- Peter Gennaro
- Kessler Twins
- Murillo
- Milton Berle (guest host)
- Sonny & Cher
- Abbe Lane
- Bill Dana
- Maury Wills
- The Rudas
- Mike McGivney
- Ray Bolger (guest host)
- Kay Starr
- Lionel Hampton
- Rich Little
- Norm Crosby
- Jim Bradley (child drummer)
- Michel De La Vega (magician)
- The Amandis (teeterboard performers)
- Judy Garland (guest host)
- Vic Damone
- Chita Rivera
- Jack Burns and Avery Schreiber
- Gene Baylos
- The Lyons family
- The Three Braghazzis
- Bing Crosby (guest host)
- Bob Hope
- Diahann Carroll
- Kessler Twins
- John W. Bubbles
- Charlie Manna
- Willie Mays
- Michael the Waiter
- Desmond and Marks
- The Black Theatre of Prague
- Janet Leigh (guest host)
- Allan Sherman
- Dan Rowan and Dick Martin
- Larry Storch
- Ken Berry
- Andy Russell
- Forrest Tucker
- Michel de la Vega
- Bob Ashley and Erwin Klein
- Milton Berle (guest host)
- Liberace
- Milton Frome
- Joey Heatherton
- The McGuire Sisters
- Cesar Romero
- Johnny Puleo
- The Piero Brothers
- The Berosinis
- Caterina Valente (guest host)
- Herb Alpert and the Tijuana Brass
- Bill Cosby
- Bill Dana
- Luiz Bonfá
- Channing Pollock
- The Black Theatre of Prague
- The Fredonias
- Bing Crosby (guest host)
- Dorothy Collins
- John Banner
- Bob Crane
- Robert Clary
- Richard Dawson
- Ivan Dixon
- Larry Hovis
- Werner Klemperer
- Fred Waring
- Some clown with Landon's Midgets
- Bob Williams and Louie the dog

=== 1966 ===
- Bing Crosby (guest host [8th time], episode 73, January 1, 1966)
- Bob Newhart
- Sonny & Cher
- Ben Blue
- David Nelson with The Flying Artons (trapeze act)
- Marilyn Maye
- Donna Butterworth
- Danny Thomas (uncredited)
- Kate Smith (guest host)
- Charles Aznavour
- Jack Burns and Avery Schreiber
- Juliet Prowse
- Charlie Cairoli
- Albert T. Berry
- The Rodos
- Prasanna Rao
- Phil Harris (guest host)
- Alice Faye
- Tim Conway
- Sergio Franchi
- The Kim Sisters
- Georgie Kaye
- Fred Astaire (guest host)
- Barrie Chase
- Petula Clark
- Mickey Rooney
- Bobby Van
- The Rudy Lenz Chimps
- Ray Hastings
- The Nitwits
- The Black Theatre of Prague
- Arthur Godfrey (guest host)
- Sid Caesar
- The Mamas & the Papas
- Abbe Lane
- Corbett Monica
- The Berosinis
- Les Apollo
- Vincent Edwards (guest host)
- The Roggé Sisters (balancing act)
- Joan Rivers
- Liliane Montevecchi
- Miss Elizabeth (trapeze performer)
- Liza Minnelli
- Bertha and her daughter, Tina with trainer C. J. Madison and assistant Stephanie Loren
- Bette Davis
- Donald O'Connor (guest host)
- Paul Anka
- Shecky Greene
- Edward G. Robinson
- Jane Morgan
- Roger Williams
- The Three Braghazzis
- The See Hee Troupe of Formose
- Bing Crosby (guest host)
- Edgar Bergen and Charlie McCarthy
- Rosemary Clooney
- Gary Crosby
- Hugh Lambert
- Roger Ray
- Fiji military band
- Liberace (guest host)
- Bob Newhart
- Jack Burns and Avery Schreiber
- John Davidson
- Marni Nixon
- Channing Pollock
- Betty Pasco
- Milton Berle (guest host)
- Martha Raye
- Adam West
- Sandler and Young
- Henny Youngman
- Elaine Dunn
- The Amin Brothers
- Fred Astaire (guest host)
- Jack Jones
- Marcel Marceau
- Ethel Merman
- Pat Morita
- The Hardy Family
- The Roggé Sisters (ball balancers)
- Robert Goulet (guest host)
- The Muppets
- Jan Murray
- Chita Rivera
- Nancy Sinatra
- Mac Ronay
- The Nerveless Nocks
- Bing Crosby (guest host)
- Nanette Fabray
- David Frost
- Tammy Grimes
- Jackie Mason
- Cully Richards
- The Harris Nelson family
- Martha Raye (guest host)
- Marty Allen and Steve Rossi
- George Carlin
- Ann Miller
- Chad and Jeremy
- Barry Sadler
- Jerry Bergen
- Gene Barry (guest host)
- Milton Berle
- Tim Conway
- Wally Cox
- Don Drysdale
- Sandy Koufax
- The McGuire Sisters
- The Mamas & the Papas
- The Hildalys
- The Rudy Lenz Chimps
- Cyd Charisse and Tony Martin (guest hosts)
- Vikki Carr
- Norm Crosby
- Dan Rowan and Dick Martin
- Cesar Romero
- Bobby Winters
- The Suns Family
- Victor Borge (guest host)
- Irwin Corey
- Peter Gennaro
- Jane Powell
- The Kim Sisters
- The Brothers Kim
- Gala Shawn
- Fred Astaire (guest host)
- Herb Alpert and the Tijuana Brass
- Barrie Chase
- The Muppets
- Louis Nye
- Helen O'Connell
- Béla Kremo
- Tarzan Zerbini
- Judy Garland (guest host)
- Jack Carter
- Van Johnson
- Johnny Rivers
- Charlie Cairoli
- The Black Theatre of Prague
- The Roselle Troupe
- Bing Crosby (guest host)
- The King Sisters with their family
- Shelley Berman
- Johnny Mercer
- Leslie Uggams
- The Mecners
- Pat Daly and Bill Wayne
- Mac Ronay
- Bing Crosby (guest host)
- George Burns
- Sid Caesar
- Lola Falana
- The Mamas & the Papas
- Joyce Jameson with Mickey Deems
- Jane Marsh
- The Rhodins
- Mac Ronay
- Phil Silvers (guest host)
- Polly Bergen
- Sergio Franchi
- Carl Reiner and Mel Brooks
- The Lovin' Spoonful
- Mr. and Mrs. Bob Top
- Tagora (sword swallower)
- Elizabeth Montgomery (guest host)
- Vic Damone
- Jackie Mason
- Paul Lynde
- Morgana King
- Baja Marimba Band
- Pat Anthony
- The Sensational Parker
- The Three Robertes or Rebertes
- Adam West (guest host)
- Roy Rogers and Dale Evans
- George Carlin
- Ray Charles
- Joey Heatherton
- Landon's Midgets
- Fred Roby
- Danny Sailor
- Phyllis Diller (guest host)
- Tony Martin
- Herman's Hermits
- Lada Edmund Jr.
- The Del Morals
- Kirk Kirkham
- The Palace Duo
- Herb Alpert and the Tijuana Brass (guest host)
- Gilbert Bécaud
- Shelley Berman
- Bill Dana
- Hendra & Ullett
- The Supremes
- The Sorlettis
- Santos
- Dale Robertson (guest host)
- Barrie Chase
- Jack Carter
- Morgana King
- The Stoneman family
- The Geezinslaw Brothers
- Don Saunders or Sanders
- The Hildalys
- Novelle's poodles
- Phil Harris (guest host)
- Abbe Lane
- George Jessel
- Jack Burns and Avery Schreiber
- David Nelson with the Flying Artons
- Jacques or Jack Ary
- Elizabeth and Collins
- Szony and Claire
- Vince Edwards (guest host)
- Peter Nero
- Juliet Prowse
- Dan Rowan and Dick Martin
- Norm Crosby
- The Standells
- The Ghezzi Brothers (acrobats)
- Otto and Anna (balancing act)
- Bing Crosby (guest host)
- Dorothy Lamour
- Sid Caesar
- Bill Dana
- Vikki Carr
- Liliane Montevecchi
- Tagora (fire eater)
- The Gimma Brothers (tumbling act)
- Victor Borge (guest host)
- Petula Clark
- Marty Allen and Steve Rossi
- Jean-Pierre Aumont and Marisa Pavan
- Claire Sombert and Michel Bruel
- The Flying Cavarettas
- Dennis Breilein
- Baby Sabu the elephant
- Jimmy Durante (guest host)
- George Carlin
- Peter Lawford
- Mrs. Miller
- The Turtles
- George Carl
- Elaine Dunn
- The Polack Brothers
- Eddie Fisher (guest host)
- Joey Forman
- Kessler Twins
- Agnes Moorehead
- The Young Americans
- The Canestrelli family
- The Swordsmen of the Lido
- Bing Crosby (guest host)
- Kathryn Grant
- Harry Crosby
- Mary Crosby
- Nathaniel Crosby
- Kate Smith
- Cyd Charisse with Roy Fitzell
- Bob Newhart
- Murillo
- The Kuban Cossacks
- Excess Baggage (dog act)
- Bing Crosby (guest host)
- Dorothy Collins
- Charles Aznavour
- Skitch Henderson
- The Mills Brothers
- Jack Burns and Avery Schreiber
- Johnny Puleo

=== 1967 ===
- Ray Bolger (guest host)
- Diahann Carroll
- The King Sisters and family
- Paul Revere & the Raiders
- Audrey Meadows
- Adam Keefe
- The Morgan Ashton family
- Bing Crosby (guest host)
- Jimmy Durante
- Edie Adams
- Tim Conway
- Everett Dirksen
- Danny Sailor
- Donald O'Connor (guest host)
- Sid Caesar
- Don Ho
- Shari Lewis
- Ted Lewis
- Marilyn Maye
- Rudy Cardenas
- Bob Melvin
- Jack Benny (guest host)
- Petula Clark
- Johnny Mathis
- Ernie Terrell and the Heavyweights
- Gloria Chappell
- The Nitwits
- Brascia and Tybee
- The Halasis
- Sammy Davis Jr. (guest host)
- Liberace
- Mickey Rooney
- Kaye Stevens
- Bob Top and his wife
- Lee Tully
- The Mascotts
- Bing Crosby (guest host [14th time], episode 113, February 18, 1967)
- Dom DeLuise
- Alice Faye and Phil Harris
- Ella Fitzgerald
- Hendra & Ullett
- The Nitwits
- The Medini Brothers (acrobats)
- Van Johnson (guest host)
- The Beatles (on film)
- George Carlin
- Liza Minnelli
- Chris Noel
- Mickey Rooney
- Milo and Roger
- The Palace Duo
- Steve Lawrence (guest host)
- Bill Dana
- Phyllis Diller
- Florence Henderson
- Pat Anthony
- The Fuller Brothers
- Russ Lewis
- The Rhodins
- Kate Smith (guest host)
- Tim Conway
- Jimmy Dean
- Ann Miller
- The New Vaudeville Band
- Hugo Forgie and Shirley Marie
- The Hardly-Worthit Players
- René and his singing puppets
- George Burns (guest host)
- Lainie Kazan
- Enzo Stuarti
- The King Sisters and family
- Baby Sabu the elephant
- Desmond and Marks
- Bing Crosby (guest host)
- Louis Armstrong
- Red Buttons
- Nanette Fabray
- The Black Theatre of Prague
- The Ghezzi Brothers
- The Good Time Washboard Three
- Marvin Roy
- Cyd Charisse and Tony Martin (guest hosts)
- Carl Reiner and Mel Brooks
- Buffalo Springfield with Neil Young
- The Kim Sisters
- Jackie Clark
- Milo and Roger
- Danny Sailor
- Milton Berle (guest host)
- Roy Rogers and Dale Evans
- Willie Mays
- Jimmy Piersall
- Maury Wills
- Buddy Rich
- Marilyn King
- The Dunhills
- Prassana Rao
- Joan Crawford (guest host)
- Nancy Ames
- Tim Conway
- The Cyrkle
- Julius La Rosa
- Ralph Adams
- The Flying Cavarettas
- The Halasis
- Gene Barry (guest host)
- Theodore Bikel
- Jack Burns and Avery Schreiber
- Lana Cantrell
- Jack E. Leonard
- Mort Sahl
- Damorra and her doves
- Bing Crosby (guest host)
- Don Ameche
- Frances Langford
- Barbara McNair
- Louis Nye
- The King Sisters and family
- The Pollack Brothers
- Yonely
- Bing Crosby (guest host)
- The Association
- Milton Berle
- Diahann Carroll
- Jimmy Durante
- Joey Heatherton
- Ravi Shankar
- Phyllis Diller (guest host)
- Frankie Avalon
- Annette Funicello
- The 5th Dimension
- Phil Harris
- The Herculeans
- a seal
- Milton Berle (guest host)
- Neile Adams
- David Hedison
- Lena Horne
- Spanky and Our Gang
- Sammy Davis Jr. (guest host)
- Joey Bishop (uncredited?)
- Jack Burns and Avery Schreiber
- Diana Ross & the Supremes
- Raquel Welch
- Baby Lawrence
- Victor Borge (guest host)
- Don Ho
- Hendra & Ullett
- Mireille Mathieu
- Adam West
- Milton Berle (guest host)
- Kaye Ballard
- Irving Benson
- Joe Besser
- Irwin Corey
- The Bottoms Up
- Petula Clark (guest host)
- Noel Harrison
- Lynn Redgrave
- George Sanders
- Hendra & Ullett
- The Nitwits
- Bing Crosby (guest host)
- Victor Borge
- Paul Lynde
- Roger Miller
- Gail Martin
- Fred and Mickie Finn
- The United Nations Children's Choir
- Sid Caesar (guest host)
- Sergio Franchi
- Fran Jeffries
- Marlo Thomas
- Checkmates, Ltd.
- Steve Lawrence and Eydie Gormé (guest hosts)
- Tim Conway
- Corbett Monica
- The Mascotts
- Szony and Claire
- Milton Berle (guest host)
- The Fearsome Foursome
- Nanette Fabray
- Buddy Greco
- Jack Burns and Avery Schreiber
- The King Sisters and family
- Jimmy Durante (guest host)
- Larry Bishop and Rob Reiner
- The Grass Roots
- Milt Kamen
- The Lennon Sisters
- Ethel Merman
- Noel Harrison
- The Berosinis
- Herb Alpert and the Tijuana Brass (guest host)
- Burt Bacharach
- Baja Marimba Band
- Boyce and Hart
- Sérgio Mendes
- Wes Montgomery
- Bing Crosby (guest host)
- Harry Crosby
- Mary Crosby
- Nathaniel Crosby
- Kathryn Crosby
- The King Sisters and family
- Louis Nye
- Adam West
- The Marquis chimps
- Jimmy Durante (guest host)
- Anissa Jones
- Candy Cavareta
- The Hanneford family
- Kay's Pets
- Linon
- The Roselle Troupe
- The Rudos
- The Sensational Parker

=== 1968 ===
- Phyllis Diller (guest host)
- Shari Lewis
- Charlie Manna
- Johnnie Ray
- The Sandpipers
- Robert Vaughn
- Bing Crosby (guest host)
- Milton Berle
- Jimmy Durante
- Phil Harris
- Peggy Lee
- The Fearsome Foursome
- Lawrence Welk
- The Solokhins
- Jack Benny (guest host)
- Iris Adrian
- Beverly Washburn
- Peter and Chris Allen
- Sammy Davis Jr.
- Liza Minnelli
- Peggy Mondo
- The Rudenko Brothers
- Phil Silvers (guest host)
- Polly Bergen
- James Brown
- Jack Jones
- Connie Stevens
- Franklin D'Amore and the Bodyguards
- The Waraku Trio
- Henny Youngman
- Victor Borge (guest host)
- Steve Allen
- Dino, Desi & Billy
- The King Sisters and family
- Jayne Meadows
- The Scots Guards Bagpipe, Drum and Dancer Corps
- The Gimma Brothers
- Jimmy Durante (guest host)
- Vikki Carr
- Jimmy Dean
- Van Johnson
- The Temptations
- Pat Henry
- Mac Ronay
- Milton Berle (guest host)
- Louis Armstrong
- Phyllis Diller
- The Lettermen
- Enzo Stuarti
- Irving Benson
- Elaine Dunn
- The Bottoms Up
- Sammy Davis Jr. (guest host)
- Diahann Carroll
- Checkmates, Ltd.
- Dan Rowan and Dick Martin
- Peter Lawford
- Don Knotts (guest host)
- Nancy Ames
- Mary Costa
- Douglas Fairbanks Jr.
- The Merry-Go-Round
- Ralph Adams
- Glenn Ash
- Phil Harris (guest host)
- Phillip Crosby
- Bill Dana
- The Hollies
- Sid or Sidney Miller
- Abbe Lane
- Rose Marie
- Hendra & Ullett
- Jacques Ary
- Jimmy Durante (guest host)
- Liza Minnelli
- Tim Conway
- The Beatles (on film)
- Jerry Shane
- Fred and Mickie Finn
- Le Grand Ballet Classique
- Don Adams (guest host)
- Lee Hazlewood
- Nancy Sinatra
- Kaye Ballard
- Joey Forman
- Jerry and Diana Quarry
- The King Sisters and family
- Hal Frazier
- Bing Crosby (guest host)
- Gene Baylos
- The King Sisters
- Joe Bushkin
- Every Mother's Son
- Florence Henderson
- Sid Caesar
- Bunraku troupe
- Bing Crosby (guest host)
- Milton Berle (uncredited)
- The Four Robertis
- Abbey Lincoln
- Sid Caesar
- Your Own Thing with Leland Palmer, Danny Apolinar, John Kuhner, and Anthony Travis
- Don Adams (uncredited)
- Bobby Goldsboro
- Don Knotts (uncredited)
- The Iriston Horsemen
- Bob Gibson
- Jeannie C. Riley
- Jimmy Durante (guest host)
- Joey Heatherton
- Don Ho
- The Lennon Sisters
- Lewis and Christy
- 6 female Olympic gymnastics finalists in the U.S. Olympic trials
- Milton Berle (guest host)
- Leonard Nimoy
- Shani Wallis
- Checkmates, Ltd.
- Johnny Puleo
- Irving Benson
- The Bottoms Up
- Diahann Carroll (guest host)
- Marc Copage
- Michael Link
- Richard Harris
- Checkmates, Ltd.
- Mort Sahl
- Buddy Schwab
- Don Adams (guest host)
- Big Brother and the Holding Company (with Janis Joplin)
- Barbara Eden
- Arte Johnson
- The Brothers Castro
- The Dovyeko troupe
- Sammy Davis Jr. (guest host)
- Corbett Monica
- Aretha Franklin
- Spanky & Our Gang
- Johnny Whitaker
- John Bassett
- Mike Douglas (guest host)
- Hendra & Ullett
- Donovan
- Sérgio Mendes
- Polly Bergen
- Rudy Schweitzer
- The Solokhins
- Sid Caesar and Imogene Coca (guest hosts)
- Bee Gees
- Lou Rawls
- Jane Morgan
- Chita Rivera
- Gelina Adaskina
- Milton Berle (guest host)
- Joe Besser
- Barrie Chase
- Martha Raye
- Joey Forman
- Mary Beth Hughes
- Roosevelt Grier
- The Third Wave
- Sammy Davis Jr. (guest host)
- Jack Carter
- Lola Falana
- Carmen McRae
- Ike & Tina Turner
- Jo Anne Worley
- Bobby Doyle
- Jimmy Durante (guest host)
- Ethel Merman
- Leland Palmer
- Sugar Ray Robinson
- Vikki Carr
- Bill Dana
- Hendra & Ullett
- The Iriston Horsemen
- Bing Crosby (guest host)
- John Byner
- Glen Campbell
- Harry Crosby
- Mary Crosby
- Nathaniel Crosby
- Kathryn Grant
- The Lennon Sisters
- Nikolai Olkovikov

=== 1969 ===
- Bing Crosby (guest host)
- Judy Carne
- Bob Hope (uncredited)
- Tiny Tim
- Bobbie Gentry
- Stu Gilliam
- Earl Wilson
- The Dovyeko Troupe
- Jimmy Durante (guest host)
- Ella Fitzgerald
- Marvin Gaye
- Pat Cooper
- Sergio Franchi
- Society of Seven
- Tahiti Nui Revue
- Roy Rogers and Dale Evans (guest hosts)
- George Gobel
- Burl Ives
- Sonny James
- Jeannie C. Riley
- Irene Ryan
- Stoney Mountain Cloggers
- Don Knotts (guest host)
- Bobby Vinton
- Cyd Charisse
- Maureen Arthur
- Checkmates, Ltd.
- Georgie Kaye
- Gail Martin
- Don Adams (guest host)
- Ruth Buzzi
- Barrie Chase
- Joey Forman
- Igor Kio
- Tony Martin
- Alan Sues
- The Half Brothers
- Robert Goulet (guest host)
- Hendra & Ullett
- The Mills Brothers
- Dusty Springfield
- Kay Thompson
- Nina Logatsheva
- Jake Wakefield
- Milton Berle (guest host)
- Steve Allen
- Jayne Meadows
- Leland Palmer
- Mel Tormé
- Dana Valery
- Jerry Collins
- Dan Rowan and Dick Martin (guest hosts)
- Gene Sheldon
- Betty Walker
- Gaylord and Holiday
- Jackie Gayle
- Simmy Bow
- Irwin C. Watson
- Bing Crosby (guest host)
- Gary Crosby
- Victor Borge
- Frank Sinatra Jr.
- The Temptations
- Diana Ross & the Supremes (guest hosts)
- Donald McKayle
- Soupy Sales
- Ethel Waters
- Stevie Wonder
- Sammy Shore
- The Saddris Dancers
- Sammy Davis Jr. (guest host)
- James Brown
- Charo
- Peggy Lipton
- Dave Madden
- Nipsey Russell
- Phyllis Diller and Don Rickles (guest hosts)
- The King Sisters and family
- Terry-Thomas
- Baja Marimba Band
- Jack Walker
- Sid Caesar and Imogene Coca (guest hosts)
- Edie Adams
- Gene Baylos
- Gladys Knight & the Pips
- Buddy Rich
- Brendan Hanlon
- Nina Logatsheva
- Bing Crosby (guest host)
- Shelley Berman
- Phillip Crosby
- Four Tops
- Sally Ann Howes
- George Carl
- Dagastan tightrope walkers
- Bing Crosby (guest host)
- Sammy Davis Jr. (uncredited)
- Gwen Verdon
- Sweetwater
- Steve Lawrence and Eydie Gormé (uncredited)
- Dick Shawn
- Bobbie Gentry
- Engelbert Humperdinck
- Roy Rogers and Dale Evans (uncredited)
- Tom Jones (uncredited)
- Flip Wilson (uncredited)
- Diana Ross & the Supremes (guest hosts)
- The Jackson 5
- Alan Sues
- Sammy Davis Jr.
- Willie Tyler
- Engelbert Humperdinck (guest host)
- Nancy Ames
- Gladys Knight & the Pips
- Sid Caesar
- Maureen Arthur and Mickey Deems
- Lonnie Donegan
- Jack E. Leonard
- Sammy Davis Jr. (guest host)
- The Dells
- Cass Elliot
- Rosey Grier
- Lionel Hampton
- Peter Lawford
- Dana Valery
- Roy Rogers and Dale Evans (guest hosts)
- Sons of the Pioneers
- Roy Clark
- The Everly Brothers
- Minnie Pearl
- Junior Samples
- The Berosini Chimps
- Sammy Shore
- Milton Berle (guest host)
- Hines, Hines, and Dad
- Irving Benson
- Steve Allen
- Martha Raye
- Connie Stevens
- The Youngbloods
- Sarah Sue Gleis
- Diahann Carroll (guest host)
- Alvin Ailey
- John Byner
- Godfrey Cambridge
- Robert Culp
- Stevie Wonder
- Rudy Schweitzer
- Anthony Newley (guest host)
- Marisa Berenson
- Dyan Cannon
- Lola Falana
- Lulu
- Jo Anne Worley
- Flip Wilson (guest host)
- Janos Prohaska
- The Friends of Distinction
- Judy Carne
- Gene Baylos
- O. C. Smith
- The Dancing Devils
- The Villams
- Perry Como (guest host)
- Diahann Carroll
- Shecky Greene
- Kukla & Ollie
- Edward Villella
- George Gobel and Vikki Carr (guest hosts)
- Pat Cooper
- Enrico Macias
- Edwin Hawkins Singers
- The Mecners

=== 1970 ===
- Bing Crosby (guest host)
- Mary Costa
- Sergio Franchi
- Leland Palmer
- Tom Patchett and Jay Tarses
- The Establishment
- The Kuban Cossacks
- Mac Ronay
- Burt Bacharach and Angie Dickinson (guest hosts)
- Bill Shoemaker
- Scoey Mitchell
- Sam & Dave
- Dusty Springfield
- The Ray Charles Singers
- Roy Clark, Bobbie Gentry, and John Hartford (guest hosts)
- Johnny Maestro & the Brooklyn Bridge
- Frankie Laine
- Louis Nye
- Jackie Gayle
- Francois Szony and Rita Agnese
- Steve Lawrence and Eydie Gormé (guest hosts)
- Steve Allen and Jayne Meadows
- Roy Rogers and Dale Evans
- Sid Caesar and Imogene Coca
- Don Knotts (guest host)
- Bobby Goldsboro
- Joey Heatherton
- Mitzi McCall and Charlie Brill
- Lance Rentzel
- Baja Marimba Band
- Vino Venito
- Sunni Walton
- Bing Crosby (guest host) (last show)
