= Apache Blood =

1973 film

- Theatrical release poster
- Directed by: Tom Quillen
- Written by: Dewitt Lee; Jack Lee
- Produced by: Vern Piehl (producer); Rowd Sanders (executive producer)
- Starring: Ray Danton
- Cinematography: Vincent Powers
- Edited by: Bill Irwin
- Music by: Ed Norton
- Release date: July 13, 1973
- Running time: 86 minutes
- Country: United States
- Language: English

Apache Blood is a 1973 American Western film starring Ray Danton. The direction is credited to Thomas Quillen.

The film was originally released as A Man Called She and is also known by its 1975 reissue title, Pursuit.

== Plot summary ==
In 1860s Arizona, a peace treaty had been established between Mescalero Apaches and the U.S. government. In 1866, however, a U.S. Cavalry troupe massacred an Apache tribe, leaving only a few survivors, including a warrior named Yellow Shirt. Yellow Shirt seeks vengeance by pursuing injured cavalry officer Sam Glass.

== Production notes ==
The film was shot in Arizona in 1971 under the working title Sh'e ee Clit Soak ("The Man Who Wore the Yellow Shirt" in an Apache language, according to the film's opening narration). It is the only known directorial film credit for Thomas Quillen. Although some sources have stated this may have been a pseudonym for the film's producer, Vern Piehl, contemporary newspaper reports indicate that Quillen was a known stage director associated with the Arizona Repertory Theater and the Phoenix Musical Theater Guild.

== Reception ==
No major newspaper is known to have reviewed the film at the time of its release. In his book Western Movies, Michael R. Pitts dismissed the film as a "tatty low-budget effort".

== Cast ==
- Ray Danton as Yellow Shirt
- Dewitt Lee as Sam Glass
- Troy Nabors as Cpl. Lem Hawkins
- Diane Taylor as Yellow Shirt's Woman
- Eva Kovacs as Martha Glass
- Jason Clark as Army Dispatch Rider
- Dave Robart as Soldier
- William Chatwick as Soldier
- Carl Mancini as Soldier
- Earl Baldwin as Soldier
- Wilford 'Whizzer' White as Indian
- Carl Nelson as Indian
- Jack Lee as Soldier at Fort

== See also ==
- List of American films of 1973
