= Rascals (1938 film) =

1938 film by H. Bruce Humberstone

- Theatrical release poster
- Directed by: H. Bruce Humberstone
- Screenplay by: Robert Ellis; Helen Logan
- Produced by: John Reinhardt; John Stone
- Starring: Jane Withers; Rochelle Hudson; Robert Wilcox; Borrah Minevitch; The Harmonica Rascals
- Cinematography: Edward Cronjager
- Edited by: Harvey Manger; Jack Murray
- Production company: 20th Century Fox
- Distributed by: 20th Century Fox
- Release date: May 20, 1938
- Running time: 77 minutes
- Country: United States
- Language: English

Rascals is a 1938 American comedy film directed by H. Bruce Humberstone and written by Robert Ellis and Helen Logan. The film stars Jane Withers, Rochelle Hudson, Robert Wilcox, Borrah Minevitch, Steffi Duna and Katharine Alexander. The film was released on May 20, 1938, by 20th Century Fox.

== Plot ==
A group of Gypsy thieves with Robin Hood-like morals take in an amnesiac socialite named Margaret Adams. They try to raise money to cover an operation to restore Adams's memories.

== Cast ==
- Jane Withers as Gypsy
- Rochelle Hudson as Margaret Adams
- Robert Wilcox as Tony
- Borrah Minevitch as Gino
- Steffi Duna as Stella
- Katharine Alexander as Mrs. Agatha Adams
- Chester Clute as Mr. Roger Adams
- José Crespo as Baron Von Brun
- Paul Stanton as Dr. Cecil Carter
- Frank Reicher as Dr. C.M. Garvey
- Edward Cooper as Grayson
- Kathleen Burke as Dr. Carter's Nurse
- Myra Marsh as Hospital Nurse
- Frank Puglia as Florist
- Robert Gleckler as Police Lieutenant
- Eddie Dunn as Dugan
- Howard Hickman as Judge
- The Harmonica Rascals as Themselves
- Hope Emerson as Miss Gordon (uncredited)
