= New Zoo Revue =

American television series (1972–1977)

- Genre: Comedy; Family; Musical
- Created by: Barbara Atlas; Doug Momary
- Starring: Doug Momary; Emily Peden; Sharon Baird; Yanco Inone; Larri Thomas; Chuck Woolery; Fran Ryan
- Voices of: Bob Holt; Bill Callaway; Joni Robbins; Hazel Shermet
- Composer: Doug Momary
- Country of origin: United States

Production
- Production location: Burbank, California
- Running time: 22 minutes
- Production companies: Funco Corporation; Stone/Bradshaw Productions

Original release
- Release: January 24, 1972 – 1977

New Zoo Revue is an American half-hour children's television show that ran in first-run syndication from 1972 to 1977.

== Concept ==
The 196-episode musical comedy-format show conveyed the concepts of cooperation and guidance for living in contemporary society. Each episode dealt with a topic such as moving away, courtesy, bragging, or patience.

Though hosted by humans Doug and Emmy Jo (real-life spouses Douglas Momary and Emily Josephine Peden), the show featured costumed full-bodied puppet characters, primarily Freddie the Frog, Henrietta Hippo, and Charlie the Owl. Momary composed over 600 songs for the series.

The show received awards and recommendations from the National Education Association and the National School Board Association.

New Zoo Revue was acquired from O Atlas Entertainment and the show's original co-creator, Barbara Atlas; the property is now owned by Frank A. O'Donnell, who is based in Las Vegas. The library continues to be licensed and broadcast by various networks across the US. Episodes can be viewed, and merchandise and DVDs of the original episodes can be purchased on the Internet.

== Characters ==
=== Main characters ===
- Doug (portrayed by Doug Momary) is the host of the show who is a friend and mentor of Freddie, Charlie, and Henrietta.
- Emmy Jo (portrayed by Emily Peden) is Doug's helper.
- Freddie the Frog (performed by Yanco Inone and occasionally Scutter McKay, voiced by Joni Robbins in most appearances, Joan Gerber on one occasion) is a fun-loving frog who is a bit naïve. While the same size as the other adult-sized characters, Freddie is characterized (at least in some episodes) as a school-aged child.
- Charlie the Owl (performed by Sharon Baird, voiced by Bob Holt and later Bill Callaway in most appearances, Larry D. Mann on one occasion) is a serious, know-it-all owl who lives in a tall tree equipped with an elevator. Working as a scientist and an inventor, Charlie is known to give out "One-Bell Prizes" on occasion (subtly making a pun on the Nobel Prize).
- Henrietta Hippo (performed by Larri Thomas and occasionally Jon Linton, voiced by Hazel Shermet) is a tutu-wearing, genteel hippopotamus with a Southern Belle personality who is a bit shy.

=== Supporting characters ===
- Mr. Dingle (portrayed by Chuck Woolery in season one, Walker Edmiston in later appearances) is a friendly elderly postman who is also a shopkeeper and a Jack-of-All-Trades.
- Mrs. Goodbody (portrayed by Fran Ryan) – is a nosy neighbor who occasionally visits. She served as an advice columnist for The All-New Zoo Gazette.

=== Notable guest stars ===
- Composer Henry Mancini made a cameo appearance.
- Actor Jim Backus of Mr. Magoo and Gilligan's Island fame makes a cameo.
- Jesse White, best known as the original Maytag repairman in TV commercials, guest-starred on a few episodes.
- June Lockhart, best known for her roles on Lassie, Lost in Space and Petticoat Junction, guest-starred in the episode "Shyness" as Penelope Potter, a very shy woman.
- Richard Dawson, famous for acting in the series Hogan's Heroes and on the game shows Match Game and Family Feud, guest-starred in the "Time Travel" episode as a knight from medieval England.
- Jo Anne Worley, best known for her appearance on Rowan & Martin's Laugh-In, appeared as talk show host Vanessa Gramcracker.
