= Frank de Kova =

American actor (1910–1981)

- As "Chief Wild Eagle" in F Troop (1965–67)
- Born: Frank Campanella; March 17, 1910; Johnstown, Pennsylvania, U.S.
- Died: October 15, 1981 (aged 71); North Hills, Los Angeles, California, California, U.S.
- Resting place: Forest Lawn Memorial Park in the Hollywood Hills, California
- Occupation: Actor
- Years active: 1946–1981

Frank de Kova (March 17, 1910 – October 15, 1981) was an American character actor in films, stage, and TV.

== Biography ==
De Kova was born in Johnstown, Pennsylvania to two Sicilian parents. Before acting he was an English teacher and earned a Master of Arts in English from Columbia University. He went on to join a Shakespeare repertory group. He made his Broadway debut in Detective Story, and was discovered by director Elia Kazan.

Moving to Hollywood, he appeared in Viva Zapata! (1952) as the Mexican Colonel, and The Big Sky (1952) with Kirk Douglas. He played Abiram in The Ten Commandments, appeared in Cowboy (1958) with Glenn Ford and Jack Lemmon, and in The Mechanic (1972) with Charles Bronson and Jan-Michael Vincent and the Ralph Bakshi film American Pop.

He did much television work, including a role as Mafia hitman Jimmy Napoli in the ABC crime drama The Untouchables, and an occasional recurring role in Gunsmoke as "Tobeel", a Kiowa Indian who is a friend of Marshal Matt Dillon. He played the Arapaho Medicine Man in the Wagon Train" season 1 episode "The Gabe Carswell Story" (aired 1/14/1958). His best-known television role was as "Chief Wild Eagle", chief of the Hekawi tribe, on the western comedy F Troop (1965–1967). He also guest-starred in the ABC/Warner Brothers drama, The Roaring 20s. He appeared as Phil Kalama in "Along Came Joey" on Hawaii Five-O in 1968.

In 1981, de Kova died of heart failure in his sleep at his home in North Hills, California. He is interred at Forest Lawn Memorial Park in Hollywood Hills, California.

== Films ==
Year	Film	Role	Notes
1951	Up Front	Italian Man	uncredited
1951	The Mob	Culio	uncredited
1952	Viva Zapata!	Colonel Guajardo	uncredited
1952	Holiday for Sinners	The Wiry Man	
1952	The Big Sky	Moleface	uncredited
1952	Pony Soldier	Custin	uncredited
1953	Split Second	Dummy	
1953	The Desert Song	Mindar	
1953	Raiders of the Seven Seas	Captain Romero	
1953	Arrowhead	Chief Chattez	
1953	The Robe	Slave Dealer	uncredited
1953	All the Brothers Were Valiant	Stevenson	
1953	Fighter Attack	Benedetto	
1953	King of the Khyber Rifles	Ali Nur	
1954	They Rode West	Isatai	
1954	Valley of the Kings	Akmed Sala, Nomad Guide	uncredited
1954	Passion	Martinez	
1954	Drum Beat	Modoc Jim	
1955	The Man from Laramie	Padre	
1955	Strange Lady in Town	Anse Hatlo	
1955	Hold Back Tomorrow	Priest	
1955	Shack Out on 101	Professor Claude Dillon	
1956	The Lone Ranger	Chief Red Hawk	
1956	Santiago	Jingo	
1956	Pillars of the Sky	Zachariah	
1956	The Ten Commandments	Abiram	
1956	The White Squaw	Yellow Elk	
1956	Reprisal!	Charlie Washackle	
1957	Run of the Arrow	Red Cloud	
1957	Appointment with a Shadow	Dutch Hayden	
1957	Ride Out for Revenge	Chief Yellow Wolf	
1958	Cowboy	Alcalde	
1958	The Brothers Karamazov	Captain Vrublevski	
1958	Machine-Gun Kelly	Harry	
1958	Teenage Cave Man	The Black-Bearded One	
1958	Apache Territory	Lugo	
1959	Day of the Outlaw	Denver, Bruhn's Gang	
1959	The Jayhawkers!	Evans	
1960	The Rise and Fall of Legs Diamond	"The Chairman"	
1961	Portrait of a Mobster	Anthony Parazzo	
1961	Atlantis, the Lost Continent	Sonoy the Astrologer	
1962	Follow That Dream	Jack	
1963	The Raiders	Pawnee Chief	uncredited
1965	Those Calloways	Nigosh	
1965	The Greatest Story Ever Told	The Tormentor	
1965	The Sword of Ali Baba	Old Baba	
1967	The Legend of the Boy and the Eagle	Narrator	voice only
1970	The Wild Country	Two Dog	
1972	The Mechanic	The Man	
1973	Heavy Traffic	Angelo "Angie" Corleone	voice only
1973	The Slams	Capiello	
1973	The Don Is Dead	Giunta	
1974	Jive Turkey	Big Tony	
1975	Coonskin	Mannigan, Ruby	voice only
1975	Johnny Firecloud	White Eagle	
1978	Cat in the Cage	Rachid Khan	
1980	Mafia on the Bounty	Rupolo	
1981	American Pop	Crisco	
1982	Hey Good Lookin'	Old Vinnie	voice only (final film role)

== Television ==
Year	Series	Role	Episode
1956	Gunsmoke	Tobeel	Season 2 Episode 10: "Greater Love"
1956	The Ford Television Theatre	Delwin Slater	Season 4 Episode 25: "Double Trouble"
1956	Crusader	Juan Perez	Season 1 Episode 32: "The Ballot Box"
1956	Tales of the 77th Bengal Lancers		Season 1 Episode 3: "The Hostage"
1957	Gunsmoke	Tobeel	Season 2 Episode 18: "Kick Me"
1957	Gunsmoke	Mulligan Rives	Season 2 Episode 26: "Last Fling"
1957	Hawkeye and the Last of the Mohicans	Ottawa Chief	Season 1 Episode 1: "Hawkeye's Homecoming"
1957	Crossroads	Black Hawk	Season 2 Episode 30: "Jhonakehunkga called Jim"
1957	The Adventures of Rin-Tin-Tin	Culebra	Season 3 Episode 37: "Major Swansons' Choice"
1957	The Adventures of Rin-Tin-Tin	Okoma	Season 4 Episode 1: "Return to Fort Apache"
1957	Cheyenne	Sitting Bull	Season 2 Episode 20: "The Broken Pledge"
1957	Tales of Wells Fargo	Pablo	Season 1 Episode 7: "The Lynching"
1957	Wagon Train	True Oak	Season 1 Episode 7: "The Emily Rossiter Story"
1958	Wagon Train	Running Bear	Season 1 Episode 18: "The Gabe Carswell Story"
1958	Tales of Wells Fargo	Iron Hand	Season 3 Episode 7: "End of the Trail"
1958	The Restless Gun	Lupo Lazaro	Season 2 Episode 2: "Dragon for a Day"
1958	Cheyenne	Sioux Chief	Season 3 Episode 15: "Wagon-Tongue North"
1958	Gunsmoke	Tobeel	Season 4 Episode 3: "Gunsmuggler"
1958	The Californians	Up-A-Mug	Season 2 Episode 11: "The Painless Extractionist"
1959	Alfred Hitchcock Presents	Pedro	Season 4 Episode 15: "A Personal Matter"
1959	Cheyenne	Benito Juarez	Season 4 Episode 3: "Rebellion"
1959	Buckskin	Potato Man	Season 1 Episode 23: "Coup Stick"
1959	Gunsmoke	Leader	Season 5 Episode 1: "Target"
1959	Black Saddle	Rubio Calderone	Season 1 Episode 8: "Client Martinez"
1959	Peter Gunn	Joe Taber	Season 1 Episode 27: "Breakout"
1959	U.S. Marshal	Red Slade	Season 1 Episode 34: "Maryjo Is Missing"
1959	The Untouchables	Jimmy Napoli	Season 1 Pilot Episode
1959	The Californians	Up-A-Mug	Season 2 Episode 32: "An Act of Faith"
1959	The Alaskans	Fantan	Season 1 Episode 4: "Petticoat Crew"
1959	The Alaskans	Fantan	Season 1 Episode 7: "Contest at Gold Bottom"
1959	Wagon Train	Obuki	Season 2 Episode 25: "The Sister Rita Story"
1959	Wagon Train	Ocheo	Season 2 Episode 36: "The Rodney Lawrence Story"
1959	The Rifleman	Chief Hostay	Season 1 Episode 21: "The Indian"
1959	Rawhide	Villegro	Season 2 Episode 12: "Incident at Spanish Rock"
1959	Laramie	Yellow Knife	Season 1 Episode 3: "Circle of Fire"
1959	Laramie	Sitting Bull	Season 1 Episode 12: "Man of God"
1959	The Texan	Mandan	Season 2 Episode 9: "Showdown at Abilene"
1960	Cheyenne	Dull Knife	Season 4 Episode 8: "Gold, Glory and Custer – Requiem"
1960	The Untouchables	Louis Campagna	Season 1 Episode 20: "The Unhired Assassin: Part 1"
1960	The Untouchables	Louis 'Little New York' Campagna	Season 1 Episode 21: "The Unhired Assassin: Part 2"
1960	The Untouchables	Louis Campagna	Season 1 Episode 28: "The Frank Nitti Story"
1960	The Untouchables	Bugs Donovan	Season 2 Episode 4: "The Waxey Gordon Story"
1960	The Alaskans	Fantan	Season 1 Episode 20: "The Seal-Skin Game"
1960	The Rifleman	Carl Miller	Season 2 Episode 34: "Meeting at Midnight"
1960	Tales of Wells Fargo	Joe Black	Season 4 Episode 22: "Red Ransom"
1960	The Islanders	Carlos Roca	Season 1 Episode 12: "The Widow from Richmond"
1960	Johnny Staccato	Eddie Wayneright	Season 1 Episode 19: "Night of Jeopardy"
1960	Overland Trail	Shoshone Chief	Season 1 Episode 3: "West of Boston"
1960	Five Fingers	Landau	Season 1 Episode 13: "The Judas Goat"
1960	Lawman	Jed Barker	Season 3 Episode 13: "Cornered"
1960	Wagon Train	Indian Chief	Season 3 Episode 21: "The Tom Tuckett Story"
1961	Wagon Train	Arapaho Chief	Season 5 Episode 13: "Clyde"
1961	The Untouchables	Judge Foley	Season 2 Episode 18: "The Underground Court"
1961	Rawhide	Chief Tawyawp	Season 3 Episode 20: "Incident of the Boomerang"
1961	The Tall Man	Mike Gray Eagle	Season 1 Episode 33: "The Cloudbusters"
1961	The Rebel	Richard Aloysius "Dick" Sturgis	Season 2 Episode 27: "Shriek of Silence"
1961	Cheyenne	Chief Spotted Bull	Season 6 Episode 3: "Cross Purpose"
1961	Laramie	Chief Red Wolf	Season 3 Episode 9: "Wolf Cub"
1962	The Untouchables	The Man	Season 3 Episode 20: "The Maggie Storm Story"
1962	The Untouchables	Anthony 'Tough Tony' Lamberto	Season 4 Episode 10: "A Fist of Five"
1962	Alfred Hitchcock Presents	Señor Vargas	Season 7 Episode 19: "Strange Miracle"
1962	Cheyenne	White Cloud	Season 7 Episode 6: "Indian Gold"
1962	Cheyenne	Red Knife	Season 7 Episode 8: "Pocketful of Stars"
1962	Wagon Train	Running Bear	Season 5 Episode 26: "The George B. Hanrahan Story"
1962	Thriller	Lieutenant Vincoli	Season 2 Episode 17: "La Strega"
1963	Laramie	Tah-sa	Season 4 Episode 23: "The Unvanquished"
1964	Daniel Boone	Chief Talakum	Season 1 Episode 7: "The Sound of Wings"
1965	Daniel Boone	Saugus	Season 1 Episode 24: "Four-Leaf Clover"
1965	Wagon Train	Isaiah Quickfox	Season 8 Episode 17: "The Isaiah Quickfox Story"
1965-1967	F Troop	Chief Wild Eagle	63 episodes
1968	Hawaii Five-0	Phil Kalama	Season 1 Episode 18: "Along Came Joey"
1968	The High Chaparral	Mitch	Season 2 Episode 12: "A Way of Justice"
1975	Police Woman	Vito Angelo	Season 1 Episode 19: "The Company"
1976	Cannon	Lucius Delgado	Season 5 Episode 18: "Revenge"
1977	The Rockford Files	Nova	Season 4 Episode 10: "Hotel of Fear"
1979	Little House on the Prairie	Brower	Season 5 Episode 15: "The Craftsman"
1979	Little House on the Prairie	Indian Chief Kilowatt	Season 6 Episode 7: "The Halloween Dream"
1980	The Incredible Hulk	Sam Monte	Season 3 Episode 22: "Nine Hours"
