= Ray Danton =

American actor, director and producer (1931–1992)

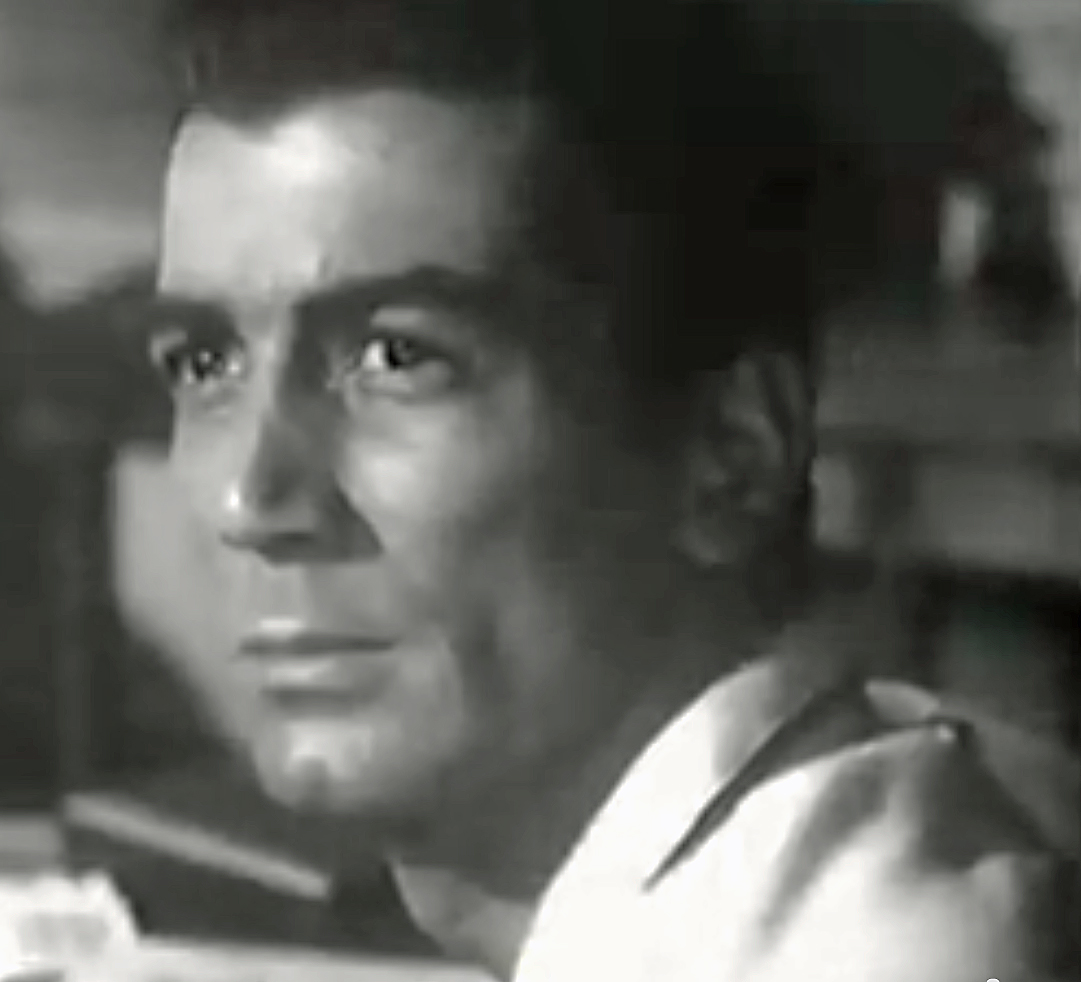
- Danton in trailer for The George Raft Story (1961)
- Born: Raymond Caplan; September 19, 1931; New York City, U.S.
- Died: February 11, 1992 (aged 60); Los Angeles, California, U.S.
- Occupations: Actor; director; producer
- Years active: 1942–1992
- Spouse: Julie Adams (m. 1954; div. 1981)
- Partner: Jeannie Austin
- Children: 2

Ray Danton (born Raymond Caplan; September 19, 1931 – February 11, 1992) was an American radio, film, stage, and television actor, director, and producer whose most famous roles were in the screen biographies The Rise and Fall of Legs Diamond (1960) and The George Raft Story (1961).

== Life and career ==
=== Early life ===
Danton was born Raymond Caplan in New York City, the son of Myrtle (née Menkin) and Jack Caplan. His family was Jewish, and he was a descendant of the Vilna Gaon.

Danton entered show business as a child radio actor on NBC radio's Let's Pretend show in 1943 at age twelve. He began acting on radio and stage regularly also working as an assistant stage manager.

Danton attended Horace Mann School and in 1947 he started at what is now Carnegie Mellon University where he appeared in many stage productions. He went to New York to try and make it on Broadway and ended up appearing on television dramas. In 1950, he went to London to appear on stage in the Tyrone Power production Mister Roberts. He returned to guest star on shows like Danger (an episode directed by Sidney Lumet) and Starlight Theatre.

Danton's acting career was put on hold when he served in the United States Army infantry during the Korean War from 1951–1953. When he returned to the U.S., he resumed his television career, appearing in shows like Kraft Theatre, The Man Behind the Badge, Lux Video Theatre and You Are There. He played Jean Lafitte in The Pirate and the Lawyer (1955) for the Hallmark Hall of Fame. He then received an offer from Universal.

=== Universal ===
Danton made his film debut in Chief Crazy Horse (1955) playing Little Big Man. His second film for Universal The Looters (1955) was where he met his future wife Julie Adams.

MGM borrowed him to play Susan Hayward's boyfriend in I'll Cry Tomorrow (1955), a sizeable hit. Back at Universal he had a role in The Spoilers (1955) then played his first lead in Outside the Law (1956).

He was prolific in television work as well as film where he received the Golden Globe Award in 1956 for the new male star of the year in film.

He had the lead in The Night Runner (1957) and appeared in shows like Studio 57, Schlitz Playhouse, Playhouse 90, Studio One in Hollywood, Matinee Theatre, Climax!, and Decision.

=== Warner Bros. ===
Danton had a supporting role in Too Much, Too Soon (1958) at Warner Bros playing an abusive husband of Diana Barrymore. He signed a long-term contract with the studio, appearing in Onionhead (1958).

Danton starred in Tarawa Beachhead (1958) at Columbia, with co-star Kerwin Mathews, and his off-screen wife Julie Adams. That year, Danton guest-starred in Yancy Derringer and shows 77 Sunset Strip.

He returned to MGM to star in two films for Albert Zugsmith: The Beat Generation and The Big Operator.

Warners gave him supporting roles in Yellowstone Kelly and Ice Palace and gave him the lead in a TV series The Alaskans (1959-1960).

The studio then cast him in his most famous role The Rise and Fall of Legs Diamond (1960) where he played the eponymous gangster for director Budd Boetticher.

He appeared in the drama series Bourbon Street Beat, Hawaiian Eye, Cheyenne, Maverick and The Roaring 20s.

In 1960, Danton and Ron Foster were cast as Kane and Tommy Potts, respectively, in the episode "Bounty List" of the Western series Colt .45. He also appeared in the ABC/WB Western Lawman. Response was so strong Warners announced they would give Danton his own show, Las Vegas.

Instead, he did A Fever in the Blood (1961) and reprised the role of Legs Diamond in Vic Morrow's Portrait of a Mobster.

Danton maintained his gangster persona with the title role in The George Raft Story, a screen biography of 1930s actor/dancer George Raft. "I guess I'm the last of the big time gangsters," he said in a 1962 interview.

In 1961, Danton co-starred with Rosalind Russell, Alec Guinness, and Madlyn Rhue in A Majority of One. He was one of many stars in The Longest Day (1962) and had a supporting role in The Chapman Report (1962).

On October 9, 1962, Danton appeared as the gunfighter Vince Jackson in the episode "The Fortune Hunter" of Laramie. He also guest-starred in the NBC Western Empire and its successor series Redigo, both starring Richard Egan. November 7, 1962 he took on the role of Lt. Steve Hamilton, one of Col. Teddy Roosevelt's "Rough Riders"(It's 1898 and The Spanish American War)in an episode entitled "Riff-Raff" on the first season of "The Virginian."

Danton was in the TV movie FBI Code 98 (1963).

In 1964, Danton was cast in the episode "The Wooing of Perilous Pauline" of Death Valley Days. He returned to the stage to perform in 110 in the Shade.

=== Europe ===
Danton went to Europe to star in Sandokan to the Rescue (1964) which was popular enough for a sequel Return of Sandokan (1964). He stayed in Europe to make Code Name: Jaguar (1965).

He returned to the USA to guest star in Honey West and The Man from UNCLE then went back to Europe to make Secret Agent Super Dragon (1966), How to Win a Billion... and Get Away with It (1967), Si muore solo una volta (1967), Lucky, el intrépido (1967), Hello Glen Ward, House Dick (1968), and Die grosse Treibjagd (1969).

He would periodically return to the US to guest star on shows like Ironside, ‘’Hawaii Five-0’’, It Takes a Thief, and Dan August.

=== Producer and director ===
He formed a production company in Europe producing films like The Last Mercenary (1968) and Triangle (1971), which he both acted in as well, and began directing with Deathmaster (1972) and Psychic Killer (1975).

He was in The Ballad of Billie Blue (1972), A Very Missing Person (1972), Runaway! (1973), The Centerfold Girls (1974), and Apache Blood (1975).

=== Return to the U.S. ===
He guest-starred in an episode of Nakia and a Hawaii Five-O episode, "Steal Now, Pay Later".

He began a busy directing career in television, helming episodes of Switch, Baretta, Cagney & Lacey, Fame, T.J. Hooker and Mickey Spillane's Mike Hammer. "Acting has fallen to an all-time low in this country," he said in a 1985 interview.

He directed a stage production of Come Back, Little Sheba in 1987.

Danton directed many episodes of Magnum PI in Season 8, 1987–1988.

== Personal life ==
Danton was married to actress Julie Adams from 1954 or 1955 until their divorce in 1981. They had two sons: assistant director Steven Danton (b. 1956) and editor Mitchell Danton (b. 1962).

== Death ==
Danton died of kidney failure in Los Angeles, California, in 1992.

== Filmography ==
- Chief Crazy Horse (1955) as Little Big Man
- The Looters (1955) as Pete Corder
- The Spoilers (1955) as Blackie
- I'll Cry Tomorrow (1955) as David Tredman
- Outside the Law (1956) as John Conrad, alias Johnny Salvo
- Somebody Up There Likes Me (1956) as Off-Screen Reporter (voice, uncredited)
- The Night Runner (1957) as Roy Turner
- Trackdown, episode "Sweetwater Texas" (1957) as Clem Reese
- Too Much, Too Soon (1958) as John Howard
- Decision, season 1, episode 3: "The Danger Game" (1958)
- Onionhead (1958) as Ensign Dennis Higgins
- Yancy Derringer, episode "An Ace Called Spade" (1958) as Spade Stuart
- Tarawa Beachhead (1958) as Lt. Joel Brady
- The Beat Generation (1959) as Stan Hess
- The Big Operator (1959) as Oscar 'The Executioner' Wetzel
- Lawman, 2 episodes (1959, 1960) as different characters
- Yellowstone Kelly (1959) as Sayapi, Gall's Nephew
- Ice Palace (1960) as Bay Husack
- The Rise and Fall of Legs Diamond (1960) as Jack 'Legs' Diamond
- Cheyenne, season 5, episode 5: "Savage Breed" (1960) as Marshal Al Lestrade
- Maverick, season 4, episode 16: "A State Of Siege" (1961) as Don Felipe Archuleta
- A Fever in the Blood (1961) as Attorney Clem Marker
- Portrait of a Mobster (1961) as 'Legs' Diamond
- The George Raft Story (1961) as George Raft
- A Majority of One (1961) as Jerry Black
- The Longest Day (1962) as Capt. Frank
- Laramie (1962) as Vince Jackson, a very suave conman/gunslinger
- The Virginian, episode "Riff Raff" (1962) as Lieutenant Steve Hamilton, an officer serving under Colonel Teddy Roosevelt in the Spanish-American War
- The Chapman Report (1962) as Fred Linden
- FBI Code 98 (1963) as Fred Vitale
- Sandokan to the Rescue (1964) as Sandokan
- Sandokan Against the Leopard of Sarawak (1964) as Sandokan
- Code Name: Jaguar (1965) as Jeff Larson
- Secret Agent Super Dragon (1966) as Bryan Cooper / Super Dragon
- Ballata da un miliardo (1967) as Big Joe Martin
- Si muore solo una volta (1967) as Mike Gold
- Lucky, the Inscrutable (1967) as Lucky
- Llaman de Jamaica, Mr. Ward (1968) as Glen Ward
- The Last Mercenary (1968) as Mark / Marco Anderson
- Triangle (1970) as Carlo Di Fermi
- Hawaii Five-O (1970) as Jimmy Nuanu (1974) as Colby
- Riuscirà il nostro eroe a ritrovare il più grande diamante del mondo? (1971) as Jimmy Logan
- The Ballad of Billie Blue (1972)
- Night Gallery (1972) as Joe Melcor (segment "The Miracle at Camafeo")
- Deathmaster (1972) (director only)
- The Runaway Train (1973) as Prof. Jack Dunn
- Blood, Black and White (1973)
- Centerfold Girls (1974) as Perry
- Apache Blood (1975) as Yellow Shirt
- Psychic Killer (1975) (director only)
- The Rockford Files, episode: "Chicken Little is a Little Chicken" (1975) as Chester Sierra
- Psychic Killer (1975) as Narrator (voice, uncredited)
- Sixpack Annie (1975) as Mr. O'Meyer
- Our Man Flint: Dead on Target (1976) as Derek Flint
