= Barrie Chase =

American actress and dancer (born 1933)

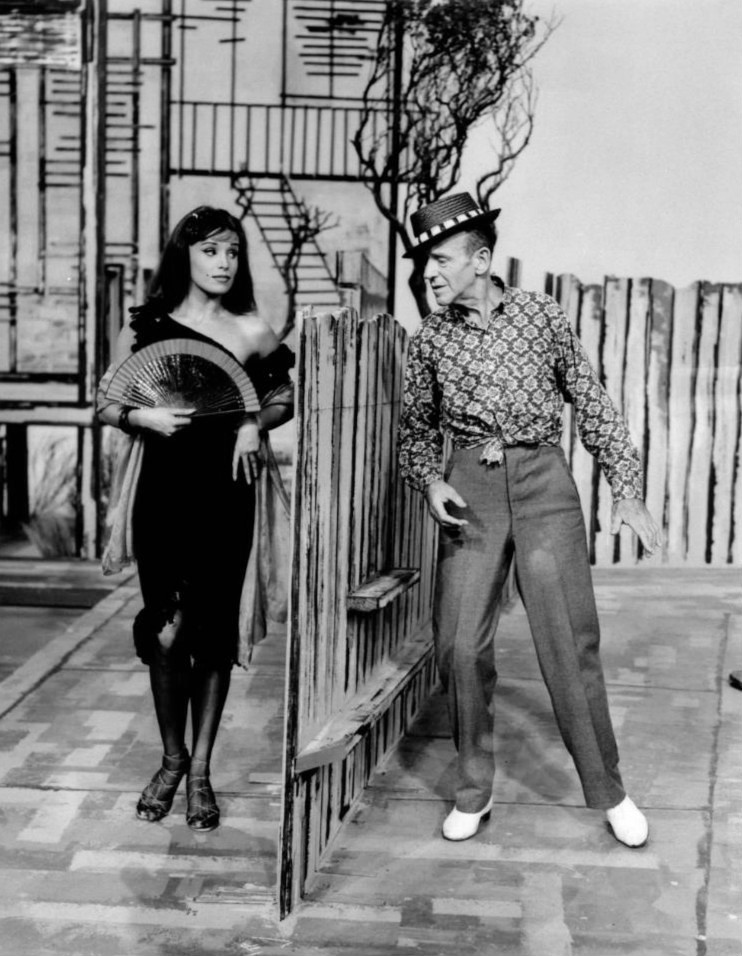
- Chase performing with Fred Astaire on Astaire Time in 1960.
- Born: October 20, 1933 (age 92); Kings Point, New York, U.S.
- Occupations: Actress, dancer
- Years active: 1952–72
- Spouse(s): Gene Shacove (m. 19??; div. 19??) Jan Malmsjö (m. 1966; div. 1968) James Kaufman (m. 1972; died 2010)
- Children: 1
- Father: Borden Chase
- Relatives: Frank Chase (brother)

Barrie Chase (born October 20, 1933) is an American actress and dancer.

== Early life ==
Born in Kings Point, New York on October 20, 1933, Chase began formal dance lessons at age three, studying with the New York City Opera's ballet mistress. She studied ballet, first with Adolph Bolm and later with Maria Bekefi. She abandoned her dream to become a ballerina in New York to stay in Los Angeles and help support her mother, pianist Lee Keith, after her parents' divorce. She is the daughter of writer Borden Chase (Red River) and sister of screenwriter/actor Frank Chase.

== Career ==
During the early 1950s, Chase danced on live television programs such as The Colgate Comedy Hour and The Chrysler Shower of Stars. While working as Jack Cole's assistant choreographer at Metro-Goldwyn-Mayer, she was asked by Fred Astaire to be his dancing partner on An Evening with Fred Astaire. She made four appearances as Astaire's partner in his television specials between 1958 and 1968. The two danced on Hollywood Palace in 1966. During this period, Chase dated Astaire, a widower 34 years her senior.

Chase appeared on the syndicated talk show version of The Donald O'Connor Show. Chase worked in the chorus of many Hollywood musicals, including Hans Christian Andersen (1952), Call Me Madam (1953), Deep in My Heart (1954), Brigadoon (1954), Kismet (1955), Pal Joey (1957), Les Girls (1957), and two Fred Astaire films, Daddy Long Legs (1955) and Silk Stockings (1957). She appeared in White Christmas (1954) as the chorus girl who speaks the line "Mutual, I'm sure." She appeared in a television episode of Have Gun – Will Travel (1958).

Chase's other film roles included The George Raft Story (1961); the beating victim of a sadistic Robert Mitchum in the thriller Cape Fear (1962); and the dancing, bikini-clad paramour (restored footage revealed her character was in reality married) of Dick Shawn's dimwitted character Sylvester Marcus in the 1963 comedy It's a Mad, Mad, Mad, Mad World. (Chase is the last surviving member of the film's large cast.) Subsequently, she played Farida in the film The Flight of the Phoenix (1965), starring James Stewart and Richard Attenborough, in a dream sequence. In 1965, she appeared in the episode "The Ballerina" on the TV series Bonanza, playing saloon dancer Kellie Conrad, who longed to be a ballerina. In 1967, she appeared as a Soviet ballerina in the episode "Fly, Ballerina, Fly" on the television series Mr. Terrific.

== Personal life ==
Barrie's husband, James Kaufman, died of Alzheimer's disease in 2010. According to the website Glamour Girls of the Silver Screen, she lives in Marina Del Rey, California.
