= Joni Robbins =

American voice actress (1946–2020)

Joni Robbins (born Joan Eva Rothman, died September 21, 2020) was an American veteran voice actress.

== Biography ==
In the 1950s, her family moved to Los Angeles so that her father Michael "Max" Rothman could work as a masseur at the Beverly Hills Health Club for the major celebrities of the day.

Robbins voiced dozens of television and radio spots including Dunkin' Donuts, Canon Copiers, Mineral Ice (as Annette Funicello), Shoetown (as Dr. Ruth Westheimer), and Earl Sheib Pink Car with the big red lips.

Robbins created the voice of Freddie the Frog on New Zoo Revue. She also voiced characters in Nickelodeon's "Kung Fu Spy Trolls" and Hanna-Barbera's "Yogi's Treasure Hunt", in which she impersonated Joan Rivers as the talking mirror.

Robbins was well known for her voices and comedic celebrity impersonations. Her many celebrity impressions included Judy Garland, Liza Minnelli, Judge Judy, Carol Channing, Annette Funicello, Dr. Ruth, Martha Stewart, Barbra Streisand, and Barbara Walters.

As a stand up comedian, Robbins appeared at "The Comedy Store", "The Laugh Factory", Igby's, and with the comedy group House of Ha with Barry Levinson and Craig Nelson. She was also a member of The Groundlings in the late seventies. As a writer, she collaborated with Emmy Award winner Rowby Goren.
