= Doug Momary =

American actor

- Born: Douglas R. Momary; June 1, 1947 (age 78); Paterson, New Jersey, U.S.
- Occupations: Actor, television producer, composer, writer
- Spouse: Emily Peden Momary

Douglas R. Momary (born June 1, 1947) is an American writer, actor, producer, and composer for television and film. He was the co-writer and co-creator of the 1970s children's TV show New Zoo Revue, in which he also starred, alongside his wife Emily Momary (née Peden).

Doug and Emily Momary own and operate the Nevada-based company Laguna Productions, which produces educational and industrial shorts, PSAs, and television commercials.

In 1973–1975 the Momarys volunteered with a high school youth group organization called Young Life in Woodland Hills, California.
