= Runaway! (1973 film) =

- Genre: Thriller; Action
- Written by: Gerald Di Pego
- Directed by: David Lowell Rich
- Starring: Ben Johnson; Ben Murphy; Ed Nelson
- Music by: Hal Mooney
- Country of origin: United States
- Original language: English

Production
- Executive producers: Jay Benson; Harve Bennett
- Producer: David Lowell Rich
- Production location: Denver
- Cinematography: Bud Thackery
- Editor: Douglas Stewart
- Running time: 73 minutes (Cut version), 85 minutes (Uncut version)
- Production company: Universal Television

Original release
- Network: ABC
- Release: September 29, 1973

Runaway! is a 1973 American made-for-television thriller film directed by David Lowell Rich. It is an action thriller involving skiers trapped on a runaway train speeding down a mountain. The film was produced by Universal and originally aired on ABC on September 29, 1973. It was re-titled The Runaway Train when released theatrically abroad.

Filming used Denver and Rio Grande Western Railroad equipment and locomotives, including the Ski Train serving the Colorado resort area west of Denver. Rio Grande locomotives were re-lettered for the fictional Sierra Pacific.

== Plot summary ==
After departing the station at a ski facility, a passenger train begins descending a long downhill grade, only to discover that the brakes don't work, apparently frozen while at the mountain station. The train continues to gain speed, and one brakeman is lost trying to kick the frozen moisture off one section of brakes. It is anticipated that the train will derail at a sharp curve once it reaches level ground, and emergency crews stand by there. The train survives the curve and continues on toward the terminal station, where the tracks abruptly end.

A last desperate measure is tried: a locomotive will join the line after the runaway train passes, chase and latch onto the end of the train, then pull the train to a stop. Meanwhile, a young woman has decided to jump from the speeding train, and a young man tries to talk her out of it.

The chase locomotive nearly catches up as it is noticed by the conductor, but the train passes the "point of no return" at which point it should be impossible to stop the train, and the dispatcher orders it to back off. Travis, the rescuing engineer, slows, but won't sit still for abandoning the runaway. Travis pushes his engine beyond safe limits, comes very close to latching but missing, then latches on and applies the brakes. Symbolically, at the same moment as Travis hard latches, the young woman about to jump takes the hand of the young man.

With full brake power by the chase engine, the train comes to a halt some 65 feet (20 metres) from the block at the end of the track, and the family members of the passengers rush out of the station to greet their once-imperiled relatives.

== Rail equipment ==
Most equipment in the film was owned by the Denver & Rio Grande Western Railroad. This can be seen in the paint schemes of the locomotives and coaches. The two engines were freight units, while the coaches were used for the D&RGW's "Ski Train" out of Denver. The lead locomotive of the passenger train is an EMD GP30, while the trailing unit is EMD GP35. The lead locomotive in the movie, D&RGW #3011, is currently on display at the Colorado Railroad Museum in Golden, CO.

== Cast ==
- Ben Johnson as Holly Gibson
- Ben Murphy as Les Reever
- Ed Nelson as Nick Staffo
- Darleen Carr as Carol Lerner
- Lee Montgomery as Mark Shedd (credited as Lee H. Montgomery)
- Martin Milner as John Shedd
- Vera Miles as Ellen
- Ray Danton as Professor Jack Dunn
