= Larri Thomas =

American actress

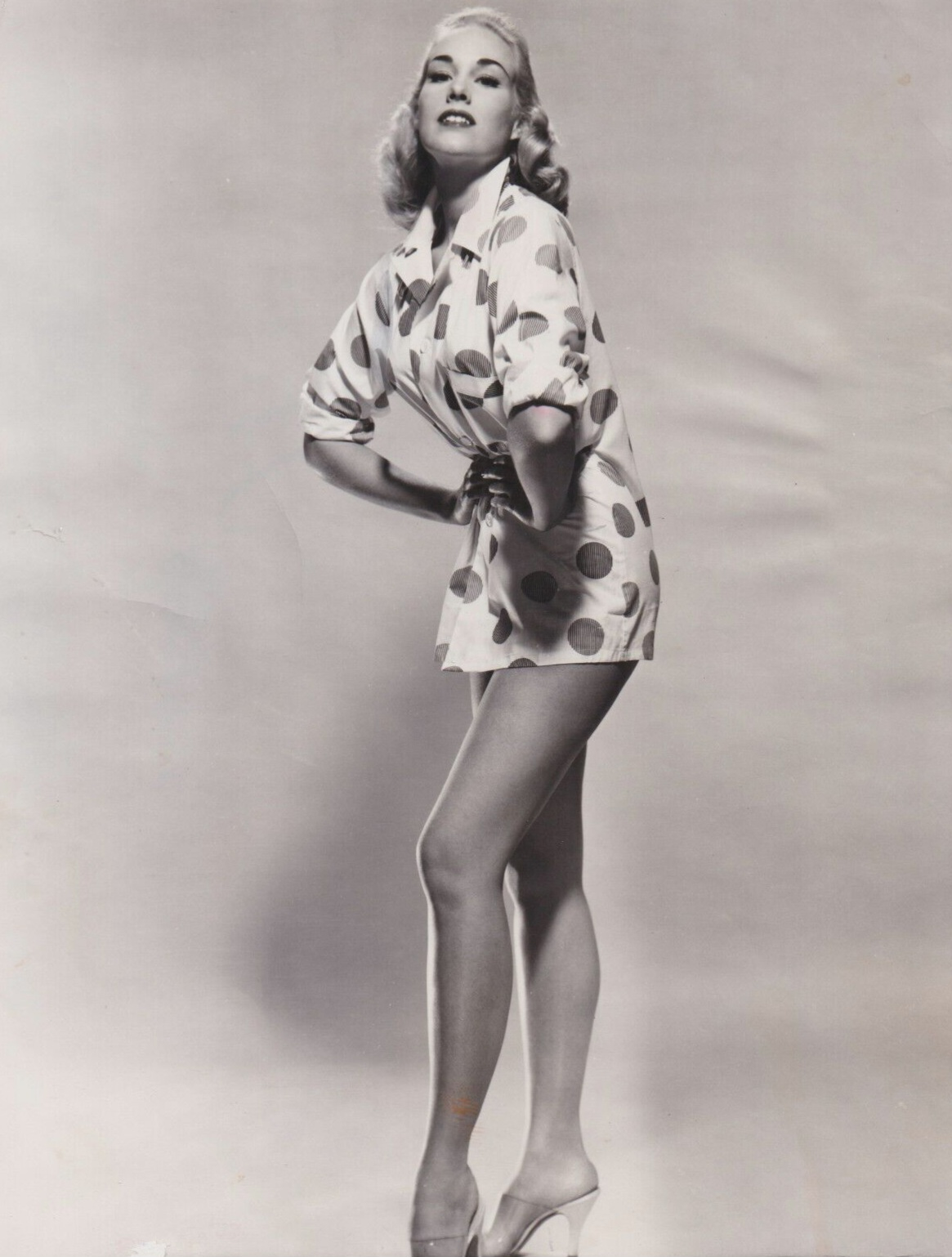
- Thomas in 1957
- Born: January 23, 1932
- Died: October 20, 2013 (aged 81); Van Nuys, Los Angeles, California, U.S.
- Occupations: Actress, dancer
- Years active: 1953–1993
- Spouses: John Bromfield (m. 1955; div. 1959) Bruce Hoy (m. 1963)
- Children: 2

Larri Thomas (January 23, 1932 – October 20, 2013) was an American actress and dancer. She began her career by participating in a string of television commercials and eventually signed a contract with NBC. The network put on Thomas' shows, including Peter Gunn and The Lucy-Desi Comedy Hour. She became one of the six Goldwyn Girls selected by Samuel Goldwyn to go on tour for the movie Guys and Dolls, in which she makes a brief appearance. Thomas was also in the movies Mary Poppins and Island of Love. She was the stand-in for Julie Andrews in some flying sequences in Mary Poppins and her stand-in in The Sound of Music. Thomas also appeared in movies and television with Dean Martin. In her later years, she appeared in Dynasty, Cheers, and Coach.

== Personal life ==
Writer Lida Larrimore Thomas was her mother. Thomas' 1951 novel The Lovely Duckling was written about Larri's childhood on the family farm in Wayne, Pennsylvania.

== Death ==
Thomas died on October 20, 2013, due to natural causes, in her Van Nuys home. She was 81 years old. Thomas' husband, Bruce Hoy died on January 31, 2014.

== Filmography ==
- Coach .... Woman #1 (1 episode, 1993)

"Christmas of the Van Damned" (1993) TV Episode .... Woman #1

- Earth Girls Are Easy (1988) .... Curl Up and Dye Dancer
- In God We Tru$t (1980)
- New Zoo Revue (1972) TV Series .... Henrietta Hippo (196 episodes)
- Frankie and Johnny (1966) (uncredited) .... Earl Barton dancer
- The Silencers (1966) (uncredited) .... Specialty Dancer
- The Dean Martin Show .... Regular (3 episodes, 1965)

Episode dated October 28, 1965 TV Episode (uncredited) .... Regular
Episode dated September 23, 1965 TV Episode (uncredited) .... Regular
Episode dated September 16, 1965 TV Episode (uncredited) .... Regular

- The Sound of Music (1965) .... Stand-in for Julie Andrews
- The Doctors and The Nurses The Prisoner: Part 1 (1964) TV Episode (as Lorie Thomas) .... Helen Walsh
- Mary Poppins (1964) (uncredited) .... Woman in Carriage & Stand-in for Julie Andrews
- Robin and the 7 Hoods (1964) (uncredited) .... Dancer
- Island of Love (1963) (uncredited)
- His Model Wife (1962) (TV) (as Lorrie Thomas)
- The Music Man (1962) (uncredited) .... High School Girl
- The Beat Generation (1959) (uncredited)
- Ask Any Girl (1959) (uncredited)
- Westinghouse Desilu Playhouse .... Miss Hairdo (1 episode, 1959)

"Lucy Wants a Career" (1959) TV Episode .... Miss Hairdo

- Peter Gunn .... Sharon Moore (1 episode, 1958)
- Rough Buck (1958) TV Episode .... Sharon Moore
- South Pacific (1958) (uncredited) .... Nurse in Thanksgiving show
- Curucu, Beast of the Amazon (1956) .... Vivian, the dancer
- Guys and Dolls (1955), Goldwyn Girl, as one of the Hot Box Girls (uncredited)
- Love Me or Leave Me (1955) (uncredited) .... Chorus girl
- Ring of Fear (1954) as a Strong Woman - talking part
- House of Wax (1953) (uncredited) as a can-can girl
- Where's Raymond - TV Series (1953-1954)..... Dancer
