= The Rise and Fall of Legs Diamond =

1960 American gangster film directed by Budd Boetticher

- VHS Cover
- Directed by: Budd Boetticher
- Written by: Joseph Landon
- Produced by: Leon Chooluck; Milton Sperling
- Starring: Ray Danton; Karen Steele; Elaine Stewart
- Cinematography: Lucien Ballard
- Edited by: Folmar Blangsted
- Music by: Leonard Rosenman
- Production company: United States Pictures
- Distributed by: Warner Bros. Pictures
- Release date: February 3, 1960
- Running time: 101 minutes
- Country: United States
- Languages: English; French; Italian; German

The Rise and Fall of Legs Diamond is a 1960 crime film directed by Budd Boetticher and starring Ray Danton, Karen Steele and Elaine Stewart. The supporting cast features Warren Oates, Jesse White and Robert Lowery. The picture marked the film debut of Dyan Cannon and was nominated for an Academy Award for Best Costume Design for Howard Shoup.

== Plot ==
In the 1920s, ambitious but smalltime thief Jack Diamond and his sickly brother Eddie Diamond move to New York City. Jack meets dance instructor Alice Shiffer, lies to her to date her and to steal a necklace from a jewelry store. After being incarcerated for a time, he works with Alice at her dance school while on probation.

He then gets hired as bodyguard of infamous Arnold Rothstein who gives him the nickname Legs. His plan is to supplant Rothstein with the intention of stealing his bootleg, drugs and gambling businesses. After Arnold is murdered, Legs Diamond sells protection. When he travels to Europe with Alice on a vacation, he sees in the newspaper that the New York underworld has changed with the National Prohibition Act. Legs returns to America and confronts the syndicate, demanding a cut from their operations. He kicks Alice out of his life and turns to Monica, who betrays him. Hit men enter his hotel room and shoot him dead. In the final scene, as his corpse is being removed on a stretcher, Alice says he was loved by many but that he loved nobody.

== Cast ==
- Ray Danton as Jack "Legs" Diamond
- Karen Steele as Alice Scott
- Elaine Stewart as Monica Drake
- Jesse White as Leo "Butcher" Bremer
- Warren Oates as Eddie Diamond
- Dyan Cannon (credited as Diane Cannon) as Dixie
- Robert Lowery as Arnold Rothstein
- Richard Gardner as Mad Dog Coll
- Gordon Jones as Sgt. Joe Cassidy
- Frank de Kova as "The Chairman"
- Sid Melton (uncredited) as Little Augie

Frank de Kova's role is listed as merely "The Chairman" of the new crime syndicate. He was portraying Lucky Luciano, but as Luciano was alive at the time, it was decided not to name him specifically.

== Production ==
=== Development ===
The popularity of Al Capone (1959) and The Untouchables led to a boom in gangster stories. In July 1959 Jack Warner announced Milton Sperling and Philip Yordan would write the script for Legs Diamond with Sperling to produce and Budd Boetticher to direct. Boetticher did it under a new non exclusive contract with Warners calling for one movie a year for four years. Boetticher later said he made the film "because I had a feeling I could make a gangster picture that was completely different from any other: it had a sense of humour." The movie was based in part on an article by Ray Robinson, 'Legs Diamond: Gangland's most hated mobster'. After Yordan handed in his script, the writer's secretary appeared and told Sperling that she had written it; Yordan admitted this was true, so Sperling fired him and hired a new writer. (Boetticher later claimed it was he who fired Yordan.)

In August 1959 George C. Scott was announced as star. The lead role was apparently offered to Robert Evans who turned it down. The part eventually went to Ray Danton, who later reprised his role as Legs Diamond in Portrait of a Mobster (1961). According to Boetticher, the director cast Ray Danton in part to try and save the marriage of Danton and Julie Adams, who Boetticher liked; Boetticher claims he tested seven actors, including Danton, but Danton's screen test was the only one he shot properly, and Jack Warner approved Danton. Danton's casting was announced in September 1959, alongside Karen Steele, who was then dating Budd Boetticher.

Boetticher said he wanted to make a film like The Triumph of the Will ("the greatest picture I ever saw") "about one of the most despicable men of all time, Adolf Hitler. So I want to make a picture about a miserable, no good son-of-a-bitch that when you walk out of the theater, you say, "God, wasn't he great!" And then you take two steps, and you say, "wait a minute, he was a miserable son-of-a-bitch!" Boetticher researched the film, found out all Diamond had done "and when I went back to Warner's and told them everything I'd learned, they wouldn't let me make the picture! So we had to clean it up a bit. We had twenty-four days on that; it was a good picture. "

Boetticher and cinematographer Lucien Ballard deliberately set out to make the film stock look "old and grainy" so it would mix in with stock footage from the period. Ballard said "we wanted to go for an authentic atmosphere for the 1920s." Ballard and Boetticher watched films from the period and noted they did not have foreground pieces, did not zoom or dolly, and did not compensate for blondness or darkness. "That's why I used Ray Danton and Karen Steele as my stars," said Boetticher. "In one scene between them, we wouldn't compensate for his darkness, and she'd be overlit. In the next scene we wouldn't compensate for her blondeness and he'd black out."

=== Shooting ===
Boetticher injured himself falling from a horse while directing the film. He later called Legs Diamond "the most difficult picture I've ever been on in my life" in part because Karen Steel was "the only person in the world I've really learned to hate" and Danton "was no friend of mine" but "somehow I worked harder when I didn't like the people." In another interview Boetticher said he disliked working with Sperling because "he thought we were really shooting junk" but said Jack Warner supported Boetticher. According to a third interview Boetticher said Ray Danton was, along with Gilbert Roland in The Bullfighter and the Lady, "the only two actors ever I've really hated... those two gave the best performances of their lives. I hated those two bastards so much."

Boetticher claimed "I'm not crazy about that picture" because "we had to personalise the ending with his wife. We had to go a little Hollywood... But we did hit in the newsreel that the world had left him."

== Reception ==
=== Box office ===
According to Boetticher "the film was a big hit." Despite this instead of consolidating his success the director then left Hollywood and went off to Mexico to make the film Arruza.

=== Critical ===
From Howard Thompson of The New York Times:

The unhealthy keynote of Warners' flashy screen portrait of the notorious Jack Diamond is that his "rise" is quite entertaining to watch ... However, there is nothing loose about the writing. Nor the crispness of Budd Boetticher's direction. Nor the course of the hero's career, as he rises from a smalltime thief to be the personal bodyguard of Arnold Rothstein.. This shrewdly mounted portrait of a man who certainly made his mark—in crime.

After he saw the film, guitarist Hank Marvin was inspired to give the name of the film to his The Rise and Fall of Flingel Bunt.

In 2008, the American Film Institute nominated this film for its Top 10 Gangster Films list.

=== Awards ===
The film received an Oscar nomanion for Best Costume design in a black and white picture.

== Musical remake ==
The film was adapted as a musical titled Legs Diamond that debuted on Broadway at the Mark Hellinger Theatre on December 26, 1988, and it closed on February 19, 1989, after 64 performances and 72 previews.

== See also ==
- List of American films of 1960

== Notes ==
- Sherman, Eric; Rubin, Martin (1970). The Director's Event: interviews with five American filmmakers. New York: Atheneum.
