= The Last Mercenary (1968 film) =

- Original film poster
- Directed by: Dieter Müller (Mel Welles)
- Screenplay by: Ricardo Ferrer; Julian Salvador; Manfred R. Köhler
- Produced by: George Ferrer
- Starring: Ray Danton; Pascale Petit
- Cinematography: José Climent
- Music by: Bruno Nicolai
- Release date: 1968
- Running time: 99 minutes
- Countries: Spain; Italy; West Germany

The Last Mercenary is a 1968 Spanish/West German/Italian international co-production of a modern-day Western. It was directed by Mel Welles who was uncredited for financial funding reasons. The film was shot in Rio de Janeiro and Spain.

== Plot ==
Following service in the Congo Crisis, two mercenary comrades in arms go their separate ways to new assignments. Mark Anderson flies to Rio de Janeiro where he is hired to protect mineral mines in the interior of Brazil from saboteurs. The saboteurs have hired his friend.

== Cast ==
- Ray Danton - Mark/Marco Anderson
- Pascale Petit - Maria
- Günther Stoll - The Man in Black
- George Rigaud - Manuel de Lagos
- Inma de Santis - Isabel
- Vicente Roca - Gomez
- Carl Möhner - Steinmann
- Piero Sciumè - Felipe
- Salvo Basile - Mine foreman
- Mel Welles - Head villain
