= Borrah Minevitch =

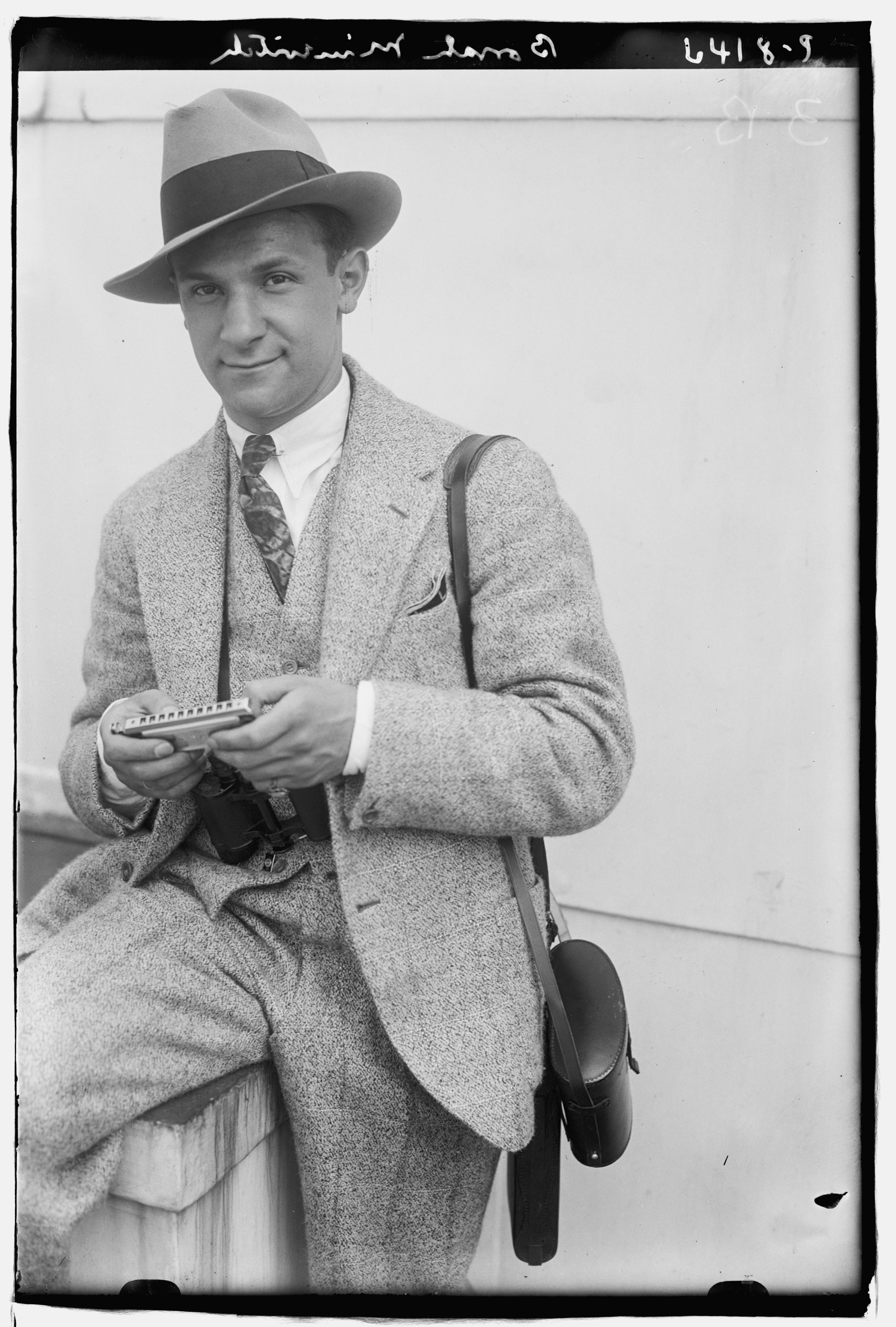
- Born: Boruch Minewitz; November 5, 1902; Minsk, Russian Empire
- Died: June 26, 1955 (aged 52); Paris, France
- Occupations: Musician, comic entertainer, bandleader
- Years active: 1920s–1955

Borrah Minevitch (born Boruch Minewitz; November 5, 1902–June 26, 1955) was a Russian-American harmonica player, comic entertainer, entrepreneur, and leader of his group The Harmonica Rascals.

== Life and career ==
He was born in the village of Borovino near Minsk, in the Russian Empire (now Belarus). He moved with his parents and six siblings to the United States in 1906, and settled in Boston, Massachusetts, where his mother set up a guest house after her husband died unexpectedly. Borrah sold newspapers, learned to play piano, violin and harmonica, and at the age of eighteen moved to New York City to study, while also working in a shoe shop and performing on his chromatic harmonica for customers. He then worked in the Wurlitzer store, where he attracted customers through his playing. His graduate paper came to the attention of the Hohner company, which distributed thousands of reprints and employed Minevitch as a publicist. It was reported that Minevitch sold the rights to his work on the chromatic harmonica to Hohner for one million dollars, and the company subsequently made a successful "Borrah Minevitch" line of harmonicas.

In the early 1920s he began performing as a soloist and featured performer in concert halls as well as in vaudeville. He conceived the idea of a harmonica orchestra, recruited some 25 youngsters from local schools, and trained them as the Symphonic Harmonica Ensemble. They performed popular classical and jazz tunes, appeared at the Metropolitan Opera House and on Broadway, and first recorded in 1926 with "Hayseed Rag". Minevitch appeared in a short film made by Lee DeForest in the short-lived sound-on-film process Phonofilm, titled A Boston Star: Borrah Minevitch, which premiered at the Rivoli Theater in New York City on 15 April 1923.

After Minevitch met the diminutive performer Johnny Puleo, he reconfigured the Ensemble into a smaller group of about nine harmonica players, and focused increasingly on slapstick comedy, renaming the group as the Harmonica Rascals. Minevitch himself became a spectacularly-dressed showman conductor. The Rascals quickly became one of vaudeville's most popular acts, and continued to appear regularly on Broadway in musicals such as Sweet and Low in 1930 as well as their own headlining shows. Their success led to a number of other harmonica-based groups forming and becoming popular in the late 1920s and 1930s.

The Harmonica Rascals recorded for Brunswick Records in 1933, and later for Decca Records, where Minevitch hired Richard Hayman as an arranger. They made many recordings over the next decade, some led and arranged by Leo Diamond and others by Minevitch. Several members of the group were virtuoso performers, including Ernie Morris and Fuzzy Feldman, though Minevitch himself rarely performed with the group after the late 1930s, and his temperamental personality and meanness made him unpopular with other performers and band members.

Minevitch promoted the band by staging stunts such as a purported kidnapping in the Mediterranean, and also actively promoted his own line of harmonicas. He eventually built a harmonica factory in southern California. He and the Rascals appeared in Lazy Bones (1934), which was a part live action, part animated film released by Fleischer Studios as one of their Screen Songs series, the live-action short Borrah Minevitch and His Harmonica Rascals (Vitaphone, 1935) and Borrah Minevitch and his Harmonica School (Warner Bros., 1942) directed by Jean Negulesco. The group appeared in several films including One in a Million (20th Century Fox, 1936), Love Under Fire (20th Century Fox 1937), Top Man (Universal Pictures 1943), Hit Parade of 1941 (Republic Pictures, 1941), Tramp, Tramp, Tramp (Columbia Pictures, 1941) and Always in My Heart (Warner Bros., 1942).

For several years, up to three lineups of Minevitch's group operated simultaneously; Minevitch maintained the group based around Puleo. According to Variety editor Abel Green, "Perhaps next to Sophie Tucker, it is the oldest consecutively booked act in the William Morris agency." Demand faltered in the late 1940s and Minevitch moved to France in 1947, developing other financial interests including film and nightclub productions. He became an ardent Francophile, and his home became a haven for show-business friends visiting Paris. He helped arrange the United States distribution for his friend Jacques Tati's films Jour de fête (1949) and Monsieur Hulot's Holiday (1953).

Minevitch's first wife was actress Betty Henry, "one of the original Tondelayos in White Cargo", according to Variety. They had one daughter, Lydia (born 1932).

He married professional artist Lucille Watson-Little on June 4, 1955. Their romance was a long one, but they were unable to marry until she received an annulment of her former marriage (to composer-author Deems Taylor).

The honeymoon couple had been married only three weeks when Minevitch suffered a cerebral hemorrhage in June 1955 (one source cites an altercation with his second wife's boyfriend). Minevitch arrived unconscious at the American Hospital in Neuilly-sur-Seine and did not recover. He died on June 26 at age 52, survived by his wife, his daughter, five sisters, and a brother.
