= Portrait of a Mobster =

1961 film by Joseph Pevney

- Directed by: Joseph Pevney
- Written by: Howard Browne
- Starring: Vic Morrow; Leslie Parrish; Ray Danton
- Cinematography: Gene Polito
- Edited by: Leo H. Shreve
- Music by: stock music by Max Steiner arranged by Howard Jackson
- Production company: Warner Bros. Pictures
- Distributed by: Warner Bros. Pictures
- Release date: April 19, 1961
- Running time: 108 minutes
- Country: United States
- Language: English

Portrait of a Mobster is a 1961 American crime film directed by Joseph Pevney and starring Vic Morrow, Leslie Parrish and Ray Danton repeating his role as 'Legs' Diamond. The film was adapted from the novel of the same name by Harry Grey. Grey also wrote The Hoods adapted for the big screen as Once Upon a Time in America, directed by Sergio Leone.

== Plot ==
Up-and-coming racketeer Dutch Schultz joins the Legs Diamond gang in Prohibition-era New York. A bootlegger named Murphy is murdered by Dutch, who falls for the dead man's daughter, Iris.

Iris marries her fiancé, Frank Brennan, a police detective. They need money and Frank accepts payoffs from Dutch, who is forming a gang of his own.

After getting rid of Legs, Mad Dog Coll and others standing in his way, Dutch again makes a play for Iris, but she learns that he killed her father and begins to drink. Frank vows to reform and win her back. Betraying his pal Bo to the mob, Dutch discovers that a hit has been put out on himself as well. While fighting for his life, he is shot by Bo by mistake and is killed.

== Cast ==
- Vic Morrow as Dutch Schultz
- Leslie Parrish as Iris Murphy
- Peter Breck as Frank Brennan
- Norman Alden as Bo Wetzel
- Robert McQueeney as Michael Ferris
- Ken Lynch as Lieutenant D. Corbin
- Stephen Roberts as Guthrie
- Joseph Gallison as Vincent Coll
- Frank DeKova as Anthony Parazzo
- Ray Danton as "Legs" Diamond
- Joseph Gallison as "Mad Dog" Coll
- Larry J. Blake as John Murphy
- Harry Holcombe as Capt. Bayridge
- Frances Morris as Louise Murphy
- Gil Perkins as Joe Murdoch
- Jon Kowal asLou Rhodes
- Arthur Tenen as Steve Matryck
- Eddie Hanley as Matty Krause
- Joe Turkel as Joe Noe
- Anthony Eisley as Legal Advisor
- Poncie Ponce as Master of Ceremonies

== Production ==
Filming started December 1960.

== Score ==
Howard Jackson compiled the score from White Heat and four other Max Steiner scores.

== Reception ==
Variety said schultz "emerges as a hollow figure".
