= 1964 in television =

The year 1964 in television involved some significant events. Below is a list of television-related events which occurred in that year.

== Events ==
- Most of NBC's programs are now broadcast in color.
- January 1 – The first Top of the Pops airs on BBC Television in the UK.
- January 3 – Footage of The Beatles performing a concert in Bournemouth, England is shown on The Jack Paar Show in the United States.
- January 4
  - TV Tokyo launched in Japan.
  - The Hollywood Palace variety series debuts on ABC in the United States, with first guest host Bing Crosby.
- February 9-23 – The Beatles appear on The Ed Sullivan Show in the United States, breaking television ratings records.
- April 20 – BBC2 starts broadcasting in the UK; the existing BBC channel is renamed BBC1.
- April 30 – Television sets manufactured as of this date are required to receive UHF channels.
- May 5 – The documentary film Seven Up! is broadcast on ITV in the UK, showing the lives of fourteen school children. Subsequent films in the series have seen them interviewed every seven years since.
- June 4 - Sylvania in the United States unveils a revolutionary color TV picture tube in which europium-bearing phosphor allows a much brighter display.
- June 6 – The Rolling Stones make their American TV debut on The Hollywood Palace, hosted by Dean Martin.
- July – The British Associated Television's series Emergency – Ward 10 shows one of the first kisses on television between black and white actors, Joan Hooley playing surgeon Louise Mahler and John White playing Dr. Giles Farmer.
- August 1 – The official launch of Melbourne's third commercial television station ATV-0, signaling the beginning of what is now Network Ten.
- September 7 – "Daisy" advertisement airs on network television in the United States as part of Lyndon B. Johnson 1964 presidential campaign.
- September 17 – The new sitcom Bewitched pilot airs on ABC in the United States starring Elizabeth Montgomery, Dick York and Agnes Moorehead.
- October 10 – NBC in the United States airs the 1964 Summer Olympics opening ceremony at Tokyo, Japan, with first time of live Olympic telecast program by geostationary communication satellite Syncom 3. This telecast marks NBC's first Olympic broadcasting stint.
- October 18 – Jackie Mason appears on The Ed Sullivan Show on CBS in the United States and is subsequently banned after he seemingly gives Ed "the finger" on the air.
- October 25 – The Rolling Stones make their first appearance on The Ed Sullivan Show; the next day, Sullivan insists that he'll never have them back.
- November 26 – Pakistan Television Corporation airs the first television broadcasts in Pakistan.
- December 6 – NBC in the United States debuts the Christmas special Rudolph the Red-Nosed Reindeer. It will become a holiday tradition, moving to CBS in 1972.

== Programs/programmes ==
- American Bandstand (1952–1989)
- Armchair Theatre (UK) (1956–1968)
- As the World Turns (1956–2010)
- Ben Casey (1961–1966)
- Blue Peter (UK) (1958–present)
- Bonanza (1959–1973)
- Bozo the Clown (1949–present)
- Candid Camera (1948–2004)
- Captain Kangaroo (1955–1984)
- Combat! (1962–1967)
- Come Dancing (UK) (1949–1995)
- Coronation Street, UK (1960–present)
- Death Valley Days (1952–1975)
- Dixon of Dock Green (UK) (1955–1976)
- Doctor Who, UK (1963–1989, 1996, 2005–present)
- Face the Nation (1954–present)
- Four Corners, Australia (1961–present)
- General Hospital (1963–present)
- Grandstand (UK) (1958–2007)
- Gunsmoke (1955–1975)
- Hallmark Hall of Fame (1951–present)
- Hockey Night in Canada (1952–present)
- It's Academic (1961–present)
- Juke Box Jury (1959–1967, 1979, 1989–1990)
- Love of Life (1951–1980)
- Match Game (1962–1969, 1973–1984, 1990–1991, 1998–1999)
- Meet the Press (1947–present)
- Mister Ed (1961–1966)
- Mutual of Omaha's Wild Kingdom (1963–1988, 2002–present)
- My Three Sons (1960–1972)
- Opportunity Knocks (UK) (1956–1978)
- Panorama (UK) (1953–present)
- Petticoat Junction (1963–1970)
- Ready Steady Go! (1963–1966)
- Search for Tomorrow (1951–1986)
- The Adventures of Ozzie and Harriet (1952–1966)
- The Andy Griffith Show (1960–1968)
- The Avengers, UK (1961–1969)
- The Bell Telephone Hour (1959–1968)
- The Beverly Hillbillies (1962–1971)
- The Dick Van Dyke Show (1961–1966)
- The Doctors (1963–1982)
- The Donna Reed Show (1958–1966)
- The Ed Sullivan Show (1948–1971)
- The Edge of Night (1956–1984)
- The Flintstones (1960–1966)
- The Fulton Sheen Program (1961–1968)
- The Fugitive (1963–67)
- The Good Old Days (UK) (1953–1983)
- The Guiding Light (1952–2009)
- The Hollywood Palace (1964-1970)
- The Jack Benny Program (1950–1965)
- The Late Late Show, Ireland (1962–present)
- The Lawrence Welk Show (1955–1982)
- The Lucy Show (1962–1968)
- The Mike Douglas Show (1961–1981)
- The Milton Berle Show (1954–1967)
- The Patty Duke Show (1963–1966)
- The Price Is Right (1956–1965)
- The Saint, UK (1962–1969)
- The Secret Storm (1954–1974)
- The Sky at Night (UK) (1957–present)
- The Today Show (1952–present)
- The Tonight Show (1954–present)
- The Tonight Show Starring Johnny Carson (1962–1992)
- This Is Your Life (UK) (1955–2003)
- Truth or Consequences (1950–1988)
- Walt Disney's Wonderful World of Color (1961–69 with this title)
- What the Papers Say (UK) (1956–2008)
- What's My Line (1950–1967)
- Wide World of Sports (1961–1997)
- Z-Cars, UK (1962–1978)

=== Debuts ===
- January 1 – Top of the Pops on BBC television (1964–2006)
- January 4 – The Hollywood Palace on ABC (1964–1970)
- January 10 – That Was The Week That Was (TW3) on NBC-TV as a half-hour satirical revue broadcast live from New York after a successful hour-long special on November 10, 1963. The show, based on the BBC program of the same name, ran through May 4, 1965. It was revived as a one-time ABC special in 1985, and as a segment on ABC's Primetime Live ca. 2004–05.
- January 14 – The Magilla Gorilla Show in syndication (1964–67)
- March 30 – The game show Jeopardy! on NBC daytime TV (1964–75, 1978–79, 1984–)
- May 4 – The American soap opera Another World on NBC at 3:00 p.m. ET, as a half-hour show (1964–99)
- September 14 – Voyage to the Bottom of the Sea on ABC (1964–1968)
- September 15 – Peyton Place on ABC (1964–1969)
- September 16 – Shindig! on ABC (1964–1966) and The Peter Potamus Show on Syndication (1964-65)
- September 17 – Bewitched on ABC (1964–1972)
- September 18
  - The Addams Family on ABC (1964–1966)
  - Jonny Quest on ABC (1964–1965)
- September 19
  - Flipper on NBC (1964–1967)
  - Kentucky Jones on NBC (1964–1965)
- September 22 – The Man from U.N.C.L.E. on NBC (1964–1968)
- September 23 – The Cara Williams Show on CBS (1964–1965)
- September 24
  - Daniel Boone on NBC (1964–1970)
  - The Munsters on CBS (1964–1966)
- September 25 – Gomer Pyle, U.S.M.C. on CBS (1964–1969)
- September 26
  - Gilligan's Island on CBS (1964–1967)
  - Linus the Lionhearted on CBS (1964-65)
- October 3 –
  - The Sullavan Brothers on ITV (1964–1965)
  - Underdog on NBC (1964–1967)
- October 4 – This Hour Has Seven Days on CBC (1964–66)
- October 5
  - 90 Bristol Court on NBC (1964–1965)
  - Harris Against the World on NBC (1964–1965)
  - Karen on NBC (1964–1965)
  - Tom, Dick and Mary on NBC (1964–1965)
- October 13 – Danger Man returns to ITV after being cancelled in 1961; It would later air on CBS as Secret Agent (1960–61, 1964–66)
- October 28 – The Wednesday Play on BBC1 (1964–1970)
- November 2 – Crossroads on ITV (1964–1988, 2001–2003)
- November 9 - The Les Crane Show, later renamed ABC's Nightlife, on ABC (1964-1965)
- The Mavis Bramston Show on ATN-7 in Australia (1964–1968)
- Spokoynoy nochi, malyshi! (Спокойной ночи, малыши!, "Good Night, Little Ones!") in the Soviet Union (1964–present)
- The Porky Pig Show on ABC (1964-67)
- Familia Telerín is aired on television in 1964. Created by Moro Brothers.

=== Ending this year ===
Date	Show	Debut
March 29	The Judy Garland Show	1963
April 25	The New Phil Silvers Show	1963
April 27	The Danny Thomas Show	1953
June 19	Mack & Myer for Hire	1963
June 19	The Twilight Zone	1959
June 19	Zoo Quest (UK)	1954
Unknown	Sing Along with Mitch	1961
Unknown	To Tell the Truth	1962

== Births ==
Date	Name	Notability
January 1	Dedee Pfeiffer	Actress (For Your Love)
January 1	Crystal R. Fox	Actress, singer (The Oprah Winfrey Show, In the Heat of the Night)
January 6	Colin Cowherd	American sports media personality
January 6	Denise Borino-Quinn	American actress (died 2010)
January 7	Nicolas Cage	Actor
January 8	Peter Jankowski	American television and film producer
January 10	Krista Tesreau	Actress (Guiding Light)
January 12	Clare Holman	British actress (Inspector Morse)
January 17	Michelle Obama	Attorney, author and former first lady of the United States
January 23	Mariska Hargitay	Actress (Law & Order: Special Victims Unit)
January 26	Paul Johansson	Actor (One Tree Hill)
February 1	Linus Roache	English actor (Law & Order, Law & Order: Special Victims Unit)
February 10	Glenn Beck	Radio host
February 11	Sarah Palin	American politician
February 11	Ken Shamrock	Pro wrestler and mixed martial artist
February 12	Raphael Sbarge	Actor (Once Upon a Time)
February 14	Valente Rodriguez	Actor (George Lopez, Happily Divorced)
February 15	Chris Farley	Actor and comedian (Saturday Night Live) (died 1997)
February 15	Mark Price	NBA basketball player
February 18	Matt Dillon	Actor
February 20	French Stewart	Actor (3rd Rock from the Sun, Mom)
February 20	Willie Garson	Actor (died 2021)
February 20	Michael A. Levine	Composer
February 21	Huw Higginson	Actor
February 25	Lee Evans	Actor
February 26	Mark Dacascos	Actor
February 27	John Pyper-Ferguson	Australian-born Canadian actor (Brothers & Sisters)
February 29	Lyndon Byers	Canadian former professional ice hockey player
March 3	Laura Harring	Actress
March 7	Wanda Sykes	Actress and comedian (The Chris Rock Show, The Wanda Sykes Show)
March 8	Bob Bergen	Voice actor (current voice of Porky Pig and Tweety)
March 9	Steve Wilkos	TV host
March 11	Shane Richie	Actor
March 11	Peter Berg	Actor
March 16	Jamie Tarses	Television producer (died 2021)
March 17	Rob Lowe	Actor (The West Wing, Brothers & Sisters, Parks and Recreation)
March 20	Susan McGinnis	American television journalist
March 25	Lisa Gay Hamilton	Actress (The Practice)
March 25	Jeryl Prescott	Actress
March 30	Ian Ziering	Actor (Beverly Hills, 90210)
April 3	Nigel Farage	British politician and broadcaster
April 4	David Cross	Actor, comedian (Mr. Show with Bob and David, Arrested Development, The Increasingly Poor Decisions of Todd Margaret)
April 4	Anthony Clark	Actor (Yes, Dear)
April 4	Robbie Rist	Actor (The Brady Bunch)
April 4	Laurie Gelman	Writer
April 5	Christopher Reid	Actor
April 6	Tim Walz	Politician
April 7	Russell Crowe	New Zealand actor
April 8	Biz Markie	Rapper (died 2021)
April 9	Bryan Spicer	Director
April 12	Mark Camacho	Actor
April 13	Caroline Rhea	Canadian actress (Sabrina the Teenage Witch)
April 13	Page Hannah	Actress
April 14	Bob Clendenin	Actor (Cougar Town)
April 14	Mike Fleiss	American television producer
April 15	Debra Hayward	Film producer
April 16	David Kohan	American television producer
April 17	Lela Rochon	American actress
April 24	Cedric the Entertainer	Actor, comedian, host (Showtime at the Apollo, The Steve Harvey Show, The Soul Man)
April 24	Djimon Hounsou	Actor
April 25	Hank Azaria	Actor (The Simpsons)
April 25	Fiona Bruce	British television presenter
April 25	Vince Offer	Pitchman
April 29	Federico Castelluccio	Actor
May 4	Jodi Applegate	American broadcast journalist
May 8	Melissa Gilbert	Actress, director (Little House on the Prairie, Sweet Justice)
May 9	Peter M. Lenkov	Canadian television and film writer
May 11	Katie Wagner	American presenter
May 13	Stephen Colbert	Comedian, host (The Colbert Report, The Late Show)
May 13	Tom Verica	Actor (American Dreams) and director
May 17	David Eigenberg	Actor (Sex and the City, Chicago Fire)
May 20	Paolo Seganti	Italian actor (As the World Turns)
May 20	Kevin Frazier	TV host
May 28	Christa Miller	Actress (The Drew Carey Show, Scrubs)
May 30	Mark Sheppard	English actor (Battlestar Galactica, Supernatural, Leverage)
June 4	Sean Pertwee	Actor (Gotham)
June 8	Gloria Reuben	Actress (ER, Falling Skies)
June 10	Kate Flannery	Actress (The Office)
June 10	Vincent Perez	Actor
June 15	Courteney Cox	Actress (Monica on Friends)
June 17	Erin Murphy	Actress (Bewitched)
June 19	Boris Johnson	British politician
June 21	Doug Savant	Actor (Melrose Place, Desperate Housewives)
June 21	David Morrissey	Actor
June 22	Amy Brenneman	Actress (NYPD Blue, Judging Amy)
June 22	Dicky Barrett	American singer
June 23	Joss Whedon	Writer, director, producer (Buffy the Vampire Slayer)
June 25	Erica Gimpel	Actress
June 27	Terry Serpico	Actor
June 29	Wendy Kilbourne	Actress
July 3	Yeardley Smith	Voice actress (Lisa Simpson on The Simpsons)
July 3	Peyton Reed	American television and film director
July 6	John Ottman	Composer
July 7	Tracy Reiner	Actress
July 12	Judi Evans	Actress (Guiding Light, Days of Our Lives)
July 14	J. Rupert Thompson	Producer
July 17	Heather Langenkamp	Actress (Just the Ten of Us)
July 18	Wendy Williams	TV host (The Wendy Williams Show)
July 20	Dean Winters	Actor (Oz)
July 21	Ross Kemp	Actor
July 22	David Spade	Actor, comedian (Saturday Night Live, Just Shoot Me!, Rules of Engagement)
July 22	Adam Godley	Actor
July 22	Bonnie Langford	Actress
July 26	Sandra Bullock	Actress
July 28	Lori Loughlin	Actress, model (Full House)
July 29	Lisa Peluso	Soap opera actress
July 30	Vivica A. Fox	Actress
August 2	Mary-Louise Parker	Actress (The West Wing, Weeds)
August 9	Hoda Kotb	American broadcast journalist
August 10	Kathy Cox	American politician
August 11	Miguel A. Núñez Jr.	Actor (Tour of Duty)
August 13	Debi Mazar	Actress
August 16	William Salyers	Actor (Rigby on Regular Show)
August 20	Flaminia Cinque	Actress (Casualty, Doctors)
August 21	Susan Eisenberg	Actress (Justice League, Jackie Chan Adventures)
August 22	Andrew Wilson	Actor
August 25	Blair Underwood	Actor (L.A. Law)
August 25	Marti Noxon	Actress
August 27	Robert Bogue	Actor (Guiding Light)
August 29	Dina Spybey	Actress
August 30	Nelson Ascencio	Cuban-American actor, comedian (Mad TV)
September 1	Ray D'Arcy	Irish TV presenter
September 2	Keanu Reeves	Actor
September 5	Thomas Mikal Ford	Actor (Martin) (died 2016)
September 6	Rosie Perez	Actress
September 7	Eazy-E	Rapper (died 1995)
September 12	Greg Gutfeld	Talk show host
September 13	Tavis Smiley	Talk show host and author
September 14	Faith Ford	Actress (Murphy Brown, Hope & Faith)
September 15	Matt Roth	Actor
September 16	Molly Shannon	Comic actress (Saturday Night Live)
September 18	Holly Robinson Peete	Actress, singer (21 Jump Street, Hangin' with Mr. Cooper, For Your Love)
September 19	Kim Richards	Actress (Nanny and the Professor)
September 25	Lily Mariye	Actress (ER)
September 26	Ty Miller	Actor (The Young Riders)
September 28	Janeane Garofalo	Actress, comedian (The Ben Stiller Show, The Larry Sanders Show, Saturday Night Live)
September 28	Laura Cerón	Mexican-born American actress (ER)
October 1	Harry Hill	Television host
October 10	Sarah Lancashire	Actress
October 12	Francisco Gattorno	Actor (Mi Pecado)
October 13	Matt Walsh	Actor
October 14	Jim Rome	Talk show host (Jim Rome Is Burning)
October 14	David Kaye	Voice actor
October 18	Sam Sorbo	Actress
October 19	Ty Pennington	Host
October 20	Kamala Harris	Politician, attorney, and first female vice president of the United States
October 25	Michael Boatman	Actor (China Beach, Arliss, Spin City)
October 25	Bruce Feiler	Writer
October 25	Kevin Michael Richardson	Voice actor (Dexter's Laboratory, The Fairly OddParents, The Proud Family, Kim Possible, Codename: Kids Next Door, The Adventures of Jimmy Neutron: Boy Genius, My Life as a Teenage Robot, Dave the Barbarian, Danny Phantom, American Dad!, Avatar: The Last Airbender, Loonatics Unleashed, The Emperor's New School, The Penguins of Madagascar, The Cleveland Show, Gravity Falls, Uncle Grandpa)
October 29	Eddie McGuire	Television host
November 1	Daran Norris	Voice actor (Cosmo on The Fairly OddParents)
November 2	Lauren Vélez	Actress (New York Undercover, Oz, Dexter)
November 2	Matt Williams	American television producer
November 4	Kurt Krakowian	Actor
November 7	Dana Plato	Actor (died 1999)
November 9	Robert Duncan McNeill	Actor (Star Trek: Voyager)
November 11	Calista Flockhart	Actress (Ally McBeal, Brothers & Sisters, Supergirl)
November 11	Philip McKeon	Actor (Alice) (died 2019)
November 14	Bill Hemmer	US news anchor
November 14	Patrick Warburton	Actor (Seinfeld, Family Guy, Buzz Lightyear of Star Command, The Tick, Kim Possible, The X's, The Emperor's New School)
November 16	Harry Lennix	Actor
November 16	Maeve Quinlan	Actress
November 20	Nick Weir	English presenter
November 21	Liza Tarbuck	English actress and presenter (Watching)
November 24	Garret Dillahunt	Actor (Raising Hope)
November 24	Brad Sherwood	Actor
November 27	Robin Givens	Actress (Head of the Class)
November 27	Adam Shankman	Actor
November 29	Don Cheadle	Actor (Picket Fences, House of Lies)
December 4	Jonathan Goldstein	Actor (Drake & Josh)
December 4	Christopher B. Duncan	Actor (The Jamie Foxx Show, The First Family)
December 4	Marisa Tomei	Actress
December 7	Patrick Fabian	Actor
December 8	Teri Hatcher	Actress (Lois & Clark: The New Adventures of Superman, Desperate Housewives)
December 9	Larry Emdur	Australian television personality
December 16	Paul Vogt	Actor, comedian (Mad TV, The Big Gay Sketch Show)
December 17	Eric Brown	Actor (Mama's Family)
December 17	Steve Marmel	Writer
December 18	Stone Cold Steve Austin	WWE wrestler
December 20	Mark Coleman	Martial artist
December 24	Mark Valley	Actor (Boston Legal)
December 27	Ian Gomez	Actor (Felicity, Cougar Town)
December 29	Kimberly Russell	Actress (Head of the Class)
December 29	Tami Reiker	American cinematographer
December 29	Michael Cudlitz	Actor (Band of Brothers, Southland, The Walking Dead)
December 30	George Newbern	Actor (Justice League, The Pirates of Dark Water, Scandal)
December 31	Michael McDonald	Actor (Mad TV)

== Deaths ==
Date	Name	Age	Notability
August 28	Gracie Allen	69	Actress/comedian (The George Burns and Gracie Allen Show)

== Television debuts ==
- Alan Arkin – East Side West Side
- Dominic Chianese – East Side West Side
- Richard Dreyfuss – Karen
- Brenda Fricker – Tolka Row
- Teri Garr – Mr. Novak
- Elliott Gould – Once Upon a Mattress
- Stacy Keach – Channing
- Malcolm McDowell – Crossroads
- Ian McKellen – The Indian Tales of Rudyard Kipling
- Robert Pine – Broadside
- John Rhys-Davies – Crossroads
- Patrick Stewart – Story Parade
- Susan Tyrrell – The Patty Duke Show
- Concha Velasco – Sábado 64
- Raquel Welch – The Virginian

== See also ==
- 1964–65 United States network television schedule
