= 90 Bristol Court =

1960s American sitcom block

- Network: NBC
- Launched: October 5, 1964
- Closed: January 4, 1965
- Country of origin: United States
- Format: Sitcom
- Running time: 90 minutes

90 Bristol Court is the umbrella title of an NBC series consisting of three sitcoms set in a Southern California apartment complex located at the title address. The 90-minute block aired Monday nights from October 5, 1964, through January 5, 1965, and consisted of Karen (7:30-8:00pm), Harris Against the World (8:00-8:30pm), and Tom, Dick, and Mary (8:30-9:00pm).

== Background ==
While they were promoted as a single programming block under the title 90 Bristol Court, the three components — Karen, Harris Against the World, and Tom, Dick and Mary — were individual series with separate casts, writing, and production staffs, with the core production companies, Kayro-Vue and Universal Television (which also produced The Munsters for CBS that season), being the only common component. The only on-air continuity from one series to the next other than the title and common street address was provided by Guy Raymond, who portrayed handyman Cliff Murdock, often seen greeting the residents in all three series as they approached their apartments.

Development of 90 Bristol Court began in August 1963. In January 1964, Television magazine reported that the three sitcoms making up 90 Bristol Court would be Old Gang of Mine (also referred to as That Old Gang of Mine), Harris Against the World, and Tom, Dick and Mary, and that Karen was under development as a stand-alone series. By March 1964, Old Gang of Mine had been dropped, and Karen had been included in 90 Bristol Court.

90 Bristol Court got its name from the fact that the program ran 90 minutes and the initials of Ninety Bristol Court spelled "NBC." The programming idea behind it was that viewers would be inclined to stay tuned to NBC for 90 straight minutes if they were watching three half-hour situation comedies marketed as a single block of programming and having a common theme of taking place in the same locale than they would if NBC aired a 90-minute drama or Western or a movie. NBC also believed that marketing the three shows as a single programming entity would build viewer loyalty to the 90-minute block as a whole rather than merely to each of its shows separately, also tending to make viewers stay tuned for the entire 90 minutes rather than switch channels as they might if the three shows were not marketed as a single programming block.

Jennings Lang, the chief of television production at Universal Television, further explained to the press that the format of 90 Bristol Court allowed for "an extraordinary elasticity" because each show was a separate entity; if viewers got in the habit of tuning in for 90 Bristol Court as a whole, the network could easily remove weak shows from the 90 Bristol Court lineup or reschedule hit series from it as fully stand-alone shows by having families move out of the apartment complex. NBC could also easily introduce new series into 90 Bristol Court by having new families move into the complex, all while retaining viewer interest in 90 Bristol Court as a whole and drawing viewers to the new shows as they became a part of the 90-minute programming block. In fact, NBC already had a fourth show under development as a possible replacement: The Trouble with Artie, possibly an alternative title for That Old Gang of Mine, starring Arthur O'Connell and Kay Medford. Another benefit of the concept was the cost-savings of requiring only a single exterior set for all three shows, since they all took place at the same apartment complex. Larry Wolters of the Chicago Tribune described the 90 Bristol Court programming concept as "a new wrinkle in comedy."

Originally, NBC planned for the 90 Bristol Court sitcoms to air in the order of their main characters' ages, with Karen first, Tom, Dick and Mary next, and Harris Against the World concluding the programming block. However, 90 Bristol Court′s producers decided that Tom, Dick and Mary was more sophisticated than Harris Against the World and therefore was a better fit for the 8:30–9:00 p.m. programming block, so the shows instead aired with Karen first at 7:30 p.m., Harris Against the World following at 8:00 p.m., and Tom, Dick and Mary at 8:30 p.m.

== Critical reception ==
When it premiered, television critics savaged 90 Bristol Court. Cleveland Amory of TV Guide gave it one of the kinder reviews, writing that "none of the three shows is, by itself, terrible; but, with the exception of the middle one [Harris Against the World] neither are they, on the average, strong enough to do anything more than grin and bore you." He found a few positives in Harris Against the World and Tom, Dick and Mary, but with regard to Karen he wrote that "in none of the episodes we've seen has there been a single redeeming feature" except for the theme song. Larry Wolters called 90 Bristol Court a "mess of unpalatable comic fodder," describing it as "three excursions into idiocy in a row" that constituted "cruel and inhuman punishment." Cecil Smith called it "as synthetic in concept as a $15 suit" and wrote that he believed viewers "will probably choose the segment that fits their particular taste and turn to it as they would any other situation comedy" rather than watch all three as NBC hoped. Jack Gould wrote, "Not a jolt of originality in story, characterization, or direction attended any of the opening installments of 90 Bristol Court," adding that 90 Bristol Court offered "a decided viewer convenience: It will be only necessary to tune out one program to skip three shows."

== Broadcast history ==
First broadcast October 5, 1964, 90 Bristol Court was among the last new programs to premiere in the 1964–1965 season. It faced formidable competition opposite the venerable To Tell the Truth, I've Got a Secret, and The Andy Griffith Show on CBS and a fledgling Voyage to the Bottom of the Sea on ABC.

Peter Tewksbury wrote, produced, and directed all three episodes that aired as part of 90 Bristol Court on November 23, 1964, and used the philosophy of Henry David Thoreau regarding simple living as a starting point for each of them: On Karen, Thoreau influenced Karen and her complicated love life when she mistakenly made three dates for the same Saturday night; on Harris Against the World, Thoreau inspired Harris to take his family fishing, only to find that he had to renew his drivers license that day; and on Tom, Dick and Mary, Dick used Thoreau's philosophy as he attempted to fix several broken household appliances.

As a whole, 90 Bristol Court fared very poorly in the ratings, as did each of its shows. TV Guide reported that the November 9 and November 16, 1964, broadcasts of 90 Bristol Court averaged below a 17 share, the level considered barely enough to justify airing it, and in mid-November 1964 The New York Times reported that NBC was planning to cancel Harris Against the World and Tom, Dick and Mary as of early January 1965. Television magazine reported that NBC's Monday evening lineup, which included 90 Bristol Court between 7:30 and 9:00 p.m., had earned only a weak 14.4/24 Nielsen rating during the November-to-December 1964 rating period, compared to 19.3/32 for CBS and 20.1/34 for ABC. During the period, Tom, Dick and Mary ranked 86th in viewership, Karen was 87th, and Harris Against the World 91st out of 96 primetime shows.

NBC's programming experiment came to an end on January 4, 1965, as it aired the 13th and final episodes of Harris Against the World and Tom, Dick, and Mary, both victims of their low Nielsen ratings. With their demise, 90 Bristol Court ceased to exist as a programming entity.

Karen survived as a stand-alone series, but all ties to 90 Bristol Court vanished from Karen — including the handyman character Cliff Murdock — after the January 4, 1965, episode. Karen lasted the rest of the 1964-65 television season, but did not long outlive 90 Bristol Court. NBC canceled Karen in February 1965. Its last new episode aired on April 19, 1965, and its last primetime rerun on August 30, 1965.

The exterior sets for 90 Bristol Court survived until sometime around 1981 and were used in the television series The Rockford Files, Banacek, Emergency!, Adam-12, and The Hardy Boys.

== Shows ==
=== Karen ===
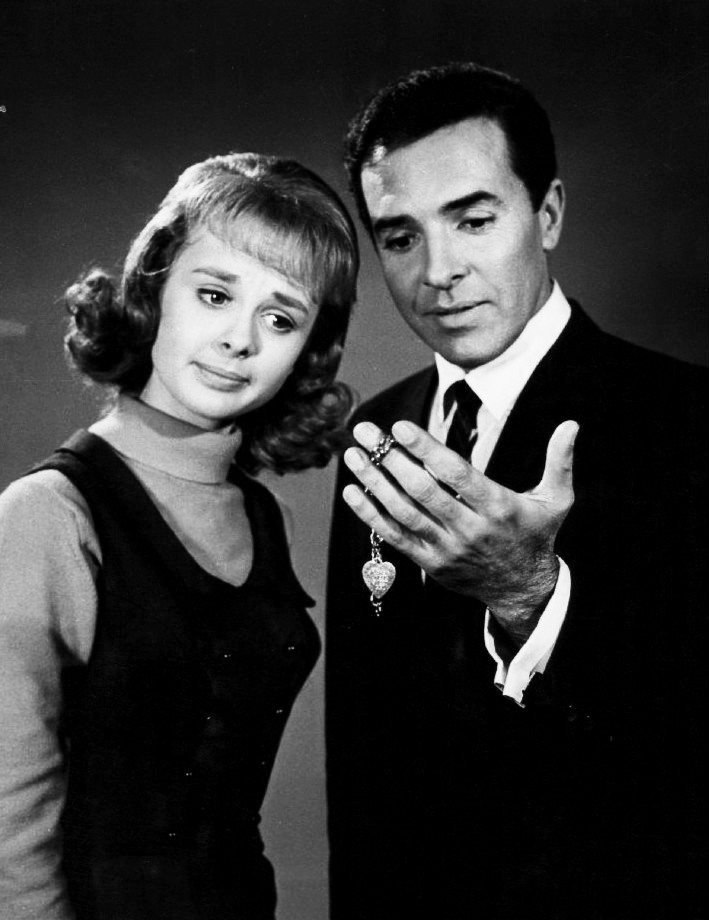
Debbie Watson and guest star Miguel Landa in Karen.

Karen, the first of the three sitcoms set at 90 Bristol Court, presented the exploits of 16-year-old Karen Scott (played by Debbie Watson) and her tomboyish little sister Mimi (Gina Gillespie). The two girls' activities continually confounded and frustrated their parents (Steve and Barbara, portrayed by Richard Denning and Mary LaRoche).

The theme song was performed by the Beach Boys. Upon the demise of 90 Bristol Court, Cliff Murdoch, the handyman who appeared in all three series set at the complex, disappeared from the remaining episodes of Karen.

=== Harris Against the World ===
The second series starred Jack Klugman as Alan Harris, a resident of the apartment complex who worked at a large Hollywood studio. Patricia Barry portrayed Harris's wife Kate, and Claire Wilcox and David Macklin played their children Deedee and Billy Harris.

The series showed Harris's frustrations with his bosses, work, finances, family, and people in general as he deals with the various setbacks in his life (not the least being Kate's spendthrift ways and her regularly "finding" Harris part-time jobs to pay for them).

=== Tom, Dick and Mary ===
The third series centered on newlyweds Tom and Mary Gentry (Don Galloway and Joyce Bulifant). Tom was an intern, Mary was a medical secretary, and their combined income was not enough to afford their new apartment at 90 Bristol Court. Tom's best friend Dick Moran (Steve Franken), also an intern, moved in to share the expenses, but often became an irritant to the newlyweds as he "played the field" in the world of romance.
