= Tom, Dick, and Mary =

1960s American television sitcom

- Clockwise from top: Steve Franken, Don Galloway, and Joyce Bulifant in Tom, Dick and Mary.
- Genre: Sitcom
- Starring: Don Galloway; Joyce Bulifant; Steve Franken
- Country of origin: United States
- Original language: English
- No. of seasons: 1
- No. of episodes: 13

Production
- Running time: 30 minutes
- Production companies: Kayro-Vue Productions; Universal Television

Original release
- Network: NBC
- Release: October 5, 1964 – January 4, 1965

Tom, Dick and Mary, also known as 90 Bristol Court: Tom, Dick and Mary, is an American sitcom that aired on NBC from October 5, 1964 until January 4, 1965. It was one of three separate comedies set in the same Los Angeles, California, apartment complex and broadcast under the collective title 90 Bristol Court. Tom, Dick and Mary was canceled after only 13 episodes aired.

== Synopsis ==
Newlyweds Tom and Mary Gentry live together in a new apartment in a fashionable apartment complex at 90 Bristol Court in Los Angeles, California. They cannot afford the apartment on their combined salaries as a medical intern and a medical secretary, respectively, at Valley General Hospital, so Tom's best friend Dick Moran, a swinging bachelor who also is an intern at Valley General, moves in to share expenses with them. Dick often becomes an irritant to the newlyweds as he intrudes on their privacy and "plays the field" in the world of romance. Dr. Krevoy is the chief of staff at the hospital, and Cliff Murdock is the building superintendent and handyman at 90 Bristol Court.

== Cast ==
- Don Galloway....Tom Gentry
- Steve Franken....Dick Moran
- Joyce Bulifant....Mary Gentry
- John Hoyt....Dr. Krevoy
- J. Edward McKinley....Horace Moran
- Guy Raymond....Cliff Murdock

== 90 Bristol Court ==
Tom, Dick and Mary was the third of three 30-minute situation comedies — along with Karen, aired first, and Harris Against the World, which aired between the other two shows — broadcast Monday nights under the umbrella title 90 Bristol Court. Despite all three shows being set at the same Los Angeles apartment complex with the address 90 Bristol Court, the only connection the three series had was the character of handyman Cliff Murdock (portrayed by Guy Raymond), who greeted the residents and visitors to 90 Bristol Court. After the last episodes of Harris Against the World and Tom, Dick and Mary aired on January 4, 1965, 90 Bristol Court ceased to be a programming entity. Although Karen continued to air after the demise of the other two series as a stand-alone show, handyman Murdock disappeared from Karen along with the 90 Bristol Court concept.

== Broadcast history ==
Tom, Dick and Mary premiered on NBC on October 5, 1964, and aired at 8:30 p.m. on Monday throughout its run. It drew low ratings: For the November-to-December 1964 reporting period, the Nielsen ratings ranked it 86th among the 96 prime-time network television shows. Karen and Harris Against the World had even lower ratings. In mid-November 1964 The New York Times reported that NBC planned to cancel both Tom, Dick and Mary and Harris Against the World, effective in early January 1965. Tom, Dick and Mary thus lasted only half a season, and the last of the 13 episodes aired on January 4, 1965.

Peter Tewksbury wrote, produced, and directed all three episodes that aired as part of 90 Bristol Court on November 23, 1964, and used the philosophy of Henry David Thoreau regarding simple living as a starting point for each of them: On Karen, Thoreau influenced Karen and her complicated love life when she mistakenly made three dates for the same Saturday night; on Harris Against the World, Thoreau inspired Harris to take his family fishing, only to find that he had to renew his driver's license that day; and on Tom, Dick and Mary, Dick used Thoreau's philosophy as he attempted to fix several broken household appliances.

== Episodes ==
NOTE: The below list reflects the general consensus of the dates, titles, and plots of the episodes of Tom, Dick and Mary. However, that consensus ascribes the same plot to the episodes of October 19 and November 9. Some sources claim that the episode listed below as airing on January 5 was broadcast on October 19. One source credits Tom Dick, and Mary with only a total of 12 episodes, with no episode at all airing on October 19.

No.	Title	Directed by	Written by	Original release date
1	"Bad Day at Bristol Court"	E.W. Swackhamer	William Jacobson	October 5, 1964
Pining for some privacy, Tom and Mary persuade Dick to move into a vacant apartment at 90 Bristol Court for just a night or two — but the apartment is not as empty as they thought. Guest stars: William Smith, Yvonne Craig, and Henry Corden.
2	"Mary Gentry, Girl Cupid"	Unknown	Unknown	October 12, 1964
Mary thinks she can find the right girl for Dick. Guest star: Jean Hale.
3	"The Joke's On You"	Unknown	Unknown	October 19, 1964
Dick's practical jokes are annoying enough at the Gentry apartment, but then he starts to play them at the hospital, too — and Tom and Mary are determined to out-prank him. Guest stars: Barbara Beal and Betty Beal.
4	"The Touch of Your Hand"	Unknown	Unknown	October 26, 1964
After a dressing down by Dr. Krevoy, Dick decides to scrap his medical career. Guest star: Woodrow Parfrey.
5	"A Lesson in Living"	Unknown	Unknown	November 2, 1964
After a visit by his much-married father, Dick tells Tom and Mary that all marriages break up eventually, and that even their happy marriage will someday, too. His amateur advice disrupts their marriage, and he is convinced they will soon split up. Guest stars: Percy Helton, Nicky Blair, and Roger Torrey.
6	"Dick and the Beanstalk"	Unknown	Unknown	November 9, 1964
Dick's practical jokes are annoying enough at the Gentry apartment, but then he starts to play them at the hospital, too — and Tom and Mary are determined to out-prank him.
7	"Tea for Two for Three"	Unknown	Unknown	November 16, 1964
Tom and Mary are celebrating an important anniversary — and three's a crowd.
8	"Simplify, Simplify"	Peter Tewksbury	Peter Tewksbury	November 23, 1964
Believing himself to be a talented handy man, Dick seeks inspiration from Henry David Thoreau's philosophy of simple living when he decides to fix some broken household appliances rather than pay an electrician to repair them. Guest star: Hal J. Todd.
9	"Broadway Comes to Valley General"	Unknown	Unknown	November 30, 1964
While producing the annual hospital variety show, Dick faces censorship by Dr. Krevoy, who is concerned about how the show will affect Valley General Hospital's image. Guest stars: Bill Chaudet, Rita D'Amico, and Karen Dolin.
10	"And Baby Makes Four"	Unknown	Unknown	December 7, 1964
Dick delivers his first baby — but the young mother's husband does not want children. Guest star: Marianna Hill, Robert Kenneally, and William Bramley.
11	"Hail! Dick the King"	Unknown	Unknown	December 14, 1964
After Dick saves a foreign visitor's life, the grateful patient follows a custom of his country and makes himself Dick's servant for life. Guest stars: David Opatoshu and Len Wayland.
12	"Love Me, Love My Experiment"	Unknown	Unknown	December 28, 1964
After Mary gives Tom a microscope, he falls in love with it — and loses interest in everything except for his experiments.
13	"Penicillin or Chicken Soup"	Unknown	Unknown	January 4, 1965
Grandma Fletcher, a visitor from Maine, almost convinces Dick of the value of home remedies. Guest stars: Minerva Urecal, Robert Cornthwaite, Mary Mitchell, and Philip Ober.
