= Don Galloway =

American stage, film and television actor (1937–2009)

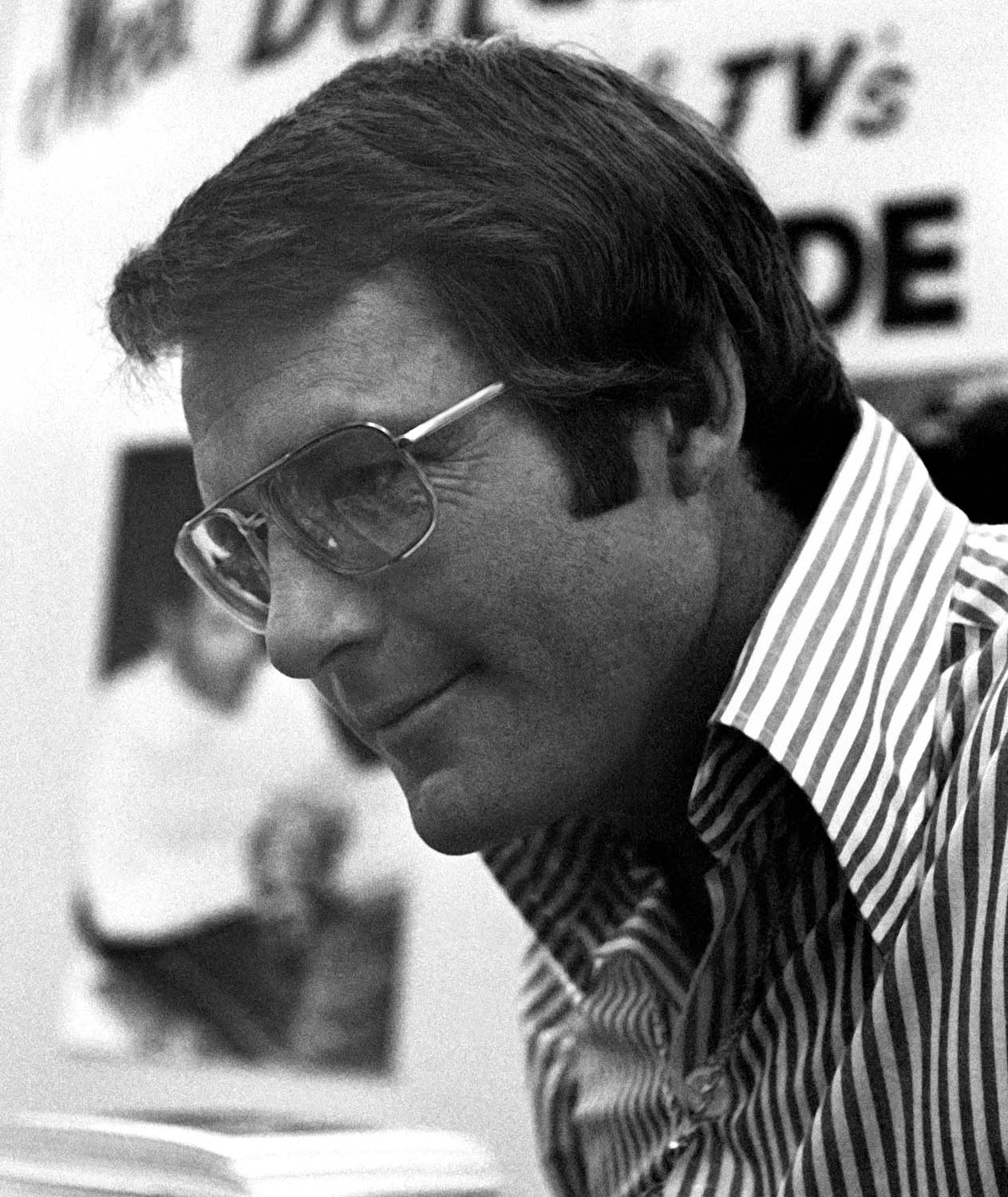
- Auto show appearance, Manhattan, February 1974 (age 36)
- Born: Donald Poe Galloway; July 27, 1937; Augusta, Kentucky
- Died: January 8, 2009 (aged 71); Reno, Nevada
- Occupations: Actor; Columnist/Journalist
- Years active: 1962–1993

Donald Poe Galloway (July 27, 1937 – January 8, 2009) was an American stage, film and television actor, best known for his role as Detective Sergeant Ed Brown in the series Ironside (1967–1975). He reprised the role for a TV film in 1993. He was also a politically active libertarian and columnist.

== Early life ==
Galloway was born in Augusta, Kentucky. His parents moved to Bracken County after the Great Flood of 1937 along the Ohio River the same year he was born. He was a 1955 graduate of Bracken County High School, where he played varsity basketball, and a 1959 graduate of the University of Kentucky, where he studied drama. He attended Concord Methodist Church located in Brooksville, Kentucky (7 miles from Augusta, Kentucky with his family from infancy till he left for college. The elders of the church said at the age of 3, he could recite long Bible verses and short stories.

== Career ==
=== Early acting roles ===
On April 16, 1962, Galloway appeared in an off-Broadway production of the play Bring Me a Warm Body. Despite the production running for only 16 performances, he received a Theater World Award.

Galloway began his television career in 1962 in the New York-based soap opera The Secret Storm as the first actor to play Kip Rysdale. He then appeared as law clerk Mitchell Harris in 26 episodes of the short-lived TV drama Arrest and Trial (1963–64), and he was seen on Tom, Dick, and Mary, one-third of the 90-minute weekly sitcom 90 Bristol Court, broadcast from 1964 to 1965.

In 1963, Galloway signed up with Universal Studios and guest-starred on numerous TV series, including The Virginian, Wagon Train, Convoy and Run for Your Life.

=== Ironside (1967–1975) ===
On March 28, 1967, Galloway starred with Raymond Burr in the TV movie Ironside. The film detailed the shooting of San Francisco Chief of Detectives Robert Ironside (played by Burr), who was left paralyzed and who used a wheelchair. The film spawned a successful series of the same name, beginning in September of that year. As Det. Sgt Ed Brown, Galloway remained on Ironside with Burr and Don Mitchell for its eight-season run, appearing in 198 of the 199 episodes.

=== Later career ===
Following the cancellation of Ironside in 1975, Galloway was reunited with Barbara Anderson, his former co-star from the show, in the TV movie You Lie So Deep, My Love. He then continued to guest-star on numerous TV series, with appearances in Police Woman, Medical Center and Charlie's Angels.

In 1979, Galloway played Timmons in the short-lived NBC comedy Hizzonner. The same year, he hosted a syndicated game show titled The Guinness Game. Galloway also made a few appearances on the popular game show Match Game.

In one of his few big-screen appearances, Galloway portrayed Richard, the husband of Karen, the character played by JoBeth Williams, in Lawrence Kasdan's 1983 film The Big Chill. He joined the cast of the soap opera General Hospital in 1985, playing Buzz Stryker until 1987.

In 1988, Galloway appeared in the Perry Mason TV movie The Case of the Avenging Ace, reuniting with Raymond Burr for the first time in 13 years. Galloway and Burr had a long association with one another; aside from Ironside and a subsequent Perry Mason movie in 1990, the two actors starred in the 1973 TV movie Portrait: A Man Whose Name Was John. In 1993, Galloway and Burr appeared together on screen for the final time, reprising their Ironside roles with fellow co-stars Don Mitchell, Barbara Anderson and Elizabeth Baur in the TV reunion movie The Return of Ironside.

== Personal life ==
After retiring from acting, Galloway briefly worked for the San Bernardino County (California) Sheriff's Department as a deputy sheriff.

For a time after his acting career, Galloway resided in Hooksett, New Hampshire and wrote a column for the Manchester Union Leader.

== Death ==
Galloway died at age 71 at the Renown Regional Medical Center in Reno, Nevada after suffering a stroke two weeks earlier. He was buried at Concord Methodist Church, Brooksville, Kentucky near his parents.

== Filmography ==
=== Film ===
Year	Title	Role	Notes
1966	The Rare Breed	Jamie Bowen	Loosely based on the life of rancher Col. John William Burgess
1967	Gunfight in Abilene	Ward Kent	The second film based on the short story "Gun Shy" by Clarence Upson Young.
1967	The Ride to Hangman's Tree	Nevada Jones	
1967	Rough Night in Jericho	Jace	Based on the novel The Man in Black, written in 1965 by Marvin H. Albert who also wrote the screenplay.
1968	Once Upon a Time in the West	Member of Frank's Gang in Flashback	Uncredited
1969	The Vendors		
1982	Satan's Mistress	Carl	
1983	The Big Chill	Richard Bowens	Filmed entirely on location in Beaufort, South Carolina and shot at the same antebellum house used as a location for The Great Santini
1988	Two Moon Junction	Senator Delongpre	
1989	Listen to Me	Harvard Coach	
1994	Clifford	Captain	Originally filmed in 1990 and scheduled for release in the summer of 1991, the movie's release was delayed due to Orion Pictures' financial problems.
1995	The Doom Generation	FBI Guy	(final film role)

=== Television ===
Year	Title	Role	Notes
1962	The Secret Storm	Kip Rysdale #1	
1963	The Alfred Hitchcock Hour	Al Aguilar	Season 1 Episode 27: "Death and the Joyful Woman"
1963	The Virginian	Jack Anderson	episode: "The Final Hour"
1963	Armstrong Circle Theatre	Guest star	episode: "Aggressor Force"
1963–1964	Arrest and Trial	Mitchell Harris	main cast; 26 episodes
1964–1965	Tom, Dick, and Mary	Dr. Tom Gentry	Main cast; 13 episodes; one-third of the 90-minute weekly sitcom 90 Bristol Court
1965	Wagon Train	Virgil Earp	episode: "The Silver Lady"
1965	Convoy	Craig	episode: "The Man with the Saltwater Socks"
1966	The John Forsythe Show	Colonel Charles Craig	episode: "Is It a Bird, Is It a Plane? No, It's Miss Culver"
1966	Run for Your Life	Don Rhine	episode: "In Search of April"
1966	Twelve O'Clock High	Captain Bruce Cowley	episode: "Twenty-Fifth Mission"
1966	The Virginian	Jim Tyson	episode: "The Challenge"
1967	Ironside	Detective Sergeant Ed Brown	TV movie
1967–1975	Ironside	Detective Sergeant Ed Brown	main cast; 198 episodes; screenwriter for episode: "Seeing Is Believing"
1970	Marcus Welby, M.D.	Bill Hull	episode: "The Girl From Rainbow Beach"
1971	Sarge	Detective Sergeant Ed Brown	episode: "The Priest Killer"; Crossover with Ironside
1971	Love, American Style	Kevin Douglas	episode: "Love and the Doctor's Honeymoon"
1972	The Bold Ones: The New Doctors	Detective Sergeant Ed Brown	episode: "Five Days In The Death Of Sgt. Brown: Part 2"; crossover with Ironside
1972	The ABC Afternoon Playbreak	Martin Thatcher	episode: "This Child is Mine" (pilot)
1973	Portrait: A Man Whose Name Was John	Monsignor Thomas Ryan	TV movie; with Raymond Burr
1973	Love, American Style	Dick	episode: "Love and the Pretty Secretary"
1975	Get Christie Love!	Marty Hazard	episode: "A High Fashion Heist"
1975	You Lie So Deep, My Love	Neal Collins	TV movie; with Ironside co-star Barbara Anderson
1975	Medical Story	Dr. Kendrick	episode:: "The God Syndrome"
1975	Movin' On	Sergeant Harris	episode: "The Toughest Men in America"
1975	Marcus Welby, M.D.	Jack Hartley	episode: "Killer Of Dreams"
1975	Police Woman	Lieutenant Buckles	episode: "Incident Near a Black and White"
1976	Gemini Man	John Hillier	episode: "Buffalo Bill Rides Again"
1976	Medical Center	Martin	episode: "Child of Conflict"
1976	Riding with Death	John Hiller	TV movie
1977	Cover Girls	James Andrews	TV movie
1977	The Life and Times of Grizzly Adams	Pinkerton	episode: "Adam's Ark"
1978	Police Woman	Grant	episode: "Tigress"
1978	Ski Lift to Death	Ron Corley	TV movie
1978	Vega$	Brad Thomas	episode: "Love, Laugh and Die"
1978	Charlie's Angels	Gorman	episode: "Angels Belong in Heaven"
1978	The Life and Times of Grizzly Adams	Sam	episode: "Once Upon a Starry Night"
1979	Hizzonner	Donald Timmons	main cast; 7 episodes
1979	Mork & Mindy	FBI Man	episode: "Yes Sir, That's My Baby"
1979	Hart to Hart	Mike Dodson	episode: "Murder Between Friends"
1980	Fantasy Island	George Reardon	episode: "Jungle Man/Mary Ann and Miss Sophisticate"
1980	CHiPs	Steve Marshall	episodes: "The Great 5K Star Race and Boulder Wrap Party: Part 1"; "The Great 5K Star Race and Boulder Wrap Party: Part 2"
1980	Condominium	Jack Messenkott	TV movie
1981	Fantasy Island	Peter Styles	episode: "The Heroine/The Warrior"
1981	Fantasy Island	Greg Randolph	episode: "Delphine/The Unkillable"
1983	Knight Rider	Edward Cole	episode: "White Bird"
1983	Automan	Martin Wills	episode: "Automan" (pilot)
1984	Hotel	Ron Bowman	episode: "Prisms"
1984	Fantasy Island	Walter Fielding	episode: "Surrogate Mother / The Ideal Woman"
1984	E/R	Robert	episode: "Save the Last Dance for Me"
1984	Rearview Mirror	Roger Seton	TV movie
1985	The Fall Guy	Mickey	episode: "High Orbit"
1985	Scarecrow and Mrs. King	Larry Credle	episode: "Odds on a Dead Pigeon"
1985	Crazy Like a Fox	Guest star	episode: "The Geronimo Machine"
1985	Knight Rider	Harley Freeman	episode: "Knight in Retreat"
1985–1987	General Hospital	Buzz Stryker	
1988	Perry Mason: The Case of the Avenging Ace	General Hobart	TV movie
1988	High Mountain Rangers	Jack Rassy	episode: "War Games"
1989	MacGyver	John Collins	episode: "Fraternity of Thieves"
1989	Murder, She Wrote	Andrew Hudson	episode: "Trevor Hudson's Legacy"
1989	Live-In	Professor Hamilton	episode: "It Takes Two to Tutor"
1989	Matlock	Philip Slayton	episode: "The Best Seller"
1989	Hunter	Bart Muller	episode: "The Fifth Victim"
1990	Dallas	Patrick Knelman	episodes: "Paradise Lost"; "Will Power"; "The Smiling Cobra"; "Family Plot"
1990	Perry Mason: The Case of the Defiant Daughter	Sergeant Hollenbeck	TV movie
1990	In the Heat of the Night	Samuel Dortland	episode: "Hearts of Gold"
1990	Rock Hudson	John Frankenheimer	TV movie
1991	Murder, She Wrote	Elton Summers	episode: "The Prodigal Father"
1991	MacGyver	Bob Stryke	episode: "Obsessed"
1993	The Return of Ironside	Ed Brown	TV movie
