= Trudi Ames =

American actress

- Ames in Karen, 1965
- Born: Trudi Ziskind; November 10, 1946 (age 79); Los Angeles, California, U.S.
- Occupations: Actress, teacher, life coach
- Years active: 1958–1968
- Spouse: Steven R. Lenenberg (m. 1971; div. 1974)

Trudi Ames (born Trudi Ziskind; November 10, 1946) is a former American actress most notable for her uncredited but memorable role in Bye Bye Birdie as Kim's best friend Ursula. She also had a notable role as Libby in Gidget Goes to Rome and was an extra in Gypsy. In a TV special on January 7, 1965, ABC recognized her as one of the entertainment industry's dozen "most promising young actresses". Ames also appeared on such television series as The Many Loves of Dobie Gillis, Make Room for Daddy, Green Acres and The Dick Van Dyke Show.

== Biography ==
Trudi Ziskind was born November 10, 1946 in Los Angeles, California, to Louis Ziskind, a social worker for Los Angeles' Jewish Committee for Personal Service, and his first wife, Edith Bernstein. She has a brother, Gregg Ziskind. She attended the University of California, Los Angeles where she was on the Dean's Honor List.

Ames married Steven R. Lenenberg in 1971; the couple divorced in 1974.

== Career ==
Ames in 1960 performed in the role of Cassie Devlin in the episode "The Sunday Man" on the television Western series Zane Grey Theatre. Three years later, at the age of 16, she made her film debut in the musical comedy Bye Bye Birdie. She had a recurring role on the television show, Karen, where she played Debbie Watson's friend, Candy. Ames appeared in other television shows during the 1960s, including episodes of Green Acres, Please Don't Eat the Daisies, My Three Sons and The Dick Van Dyke Show. During that period, Ames was also chosen as one of "The Hollywood Deb Stars of 1966."

Her post-acting life has included teaching in the Los Angeles area public schools for 20 years, and working for the Southern Pacific Railroad in 1978-83 as a brakeman and locomotive engineer.

As Prashant Ziskind, she has worked as a life transitions coach, particularly for creative people including performance artists.

== Filmography ==
- The Many Loves of Dobie Gillis (1960; two episodes as Jenny)
- Gypsy (1962) as Scottish Girl (in Uncle Jocko Scene; uncredited)
- My Three Sons (1962) season 2, Blind Date, as Janie Miller
- Gidget Goes to Rome (1963) as Libby Bennett
- Bye Bye Birdie (1963) as Ursula (uncredited)
- Cinderella (1965) as Daughter
- The Dick Van Dyke Show (1965; 1 episode as Margie)
- The Impossible Years (1968) as Francine
