= Allan Hunt =

American actor

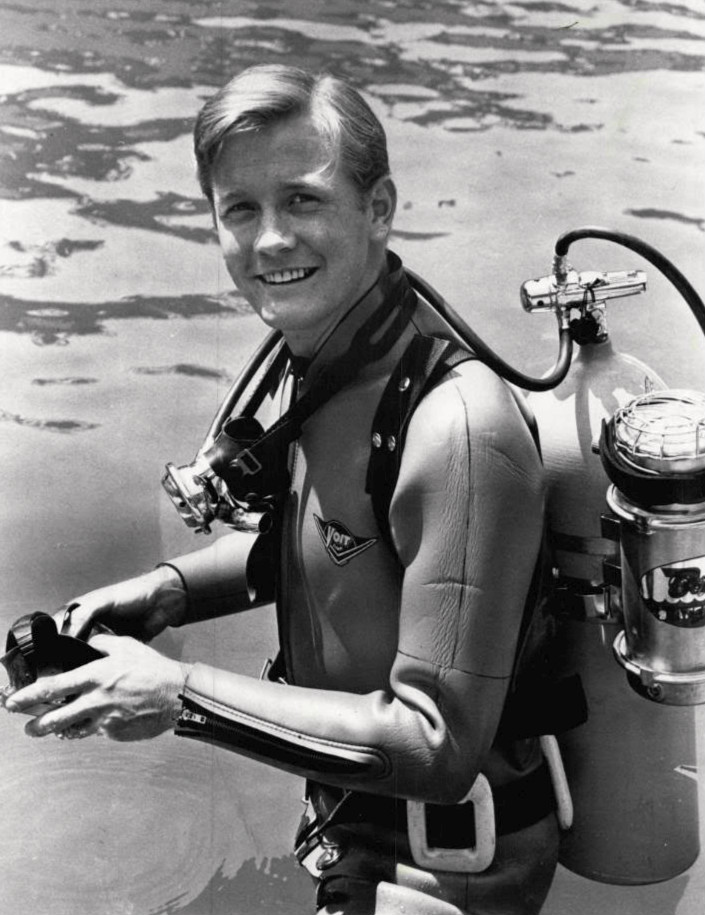
- Hunt as Stuart Riley in Voyage to the Bottom of the Sea
- Born: February 12, 1945 (age 81); California, USA
- Website: http://www.allanhunt.com

Allan Hunt (born February 12, 1945) is an American actor, probably best remembered as Crewman Stuart Riley from season 2 of ABC's Voyage to the Bottom of the Sea.

== Biography ==
Hunt trained at the Pasadena Playhouse, UCLA, American Conservatory Theater, and Seattle Repertory. After several small parts in his younger years he was cast in the second season of Voyage to the Bottom of the Sea. He almost didn't get the part because Irwin Allen didn't like the idea of having another regular character who was taller than the series' lead actor Richard Basehart (who was 5' 8"). During season two with heightening tension in Vietnam, Hunt realized that he would be drafted, so rather than take his chances with the draft, he enlisted in the Marine Corps. He trained as a US Marine at Marine Corps Air Station El Toro, then was transferred to Special Services with the US Army. During his time in Vietnam, Allan was responsible for USO shows, wrote special material and hosted and directed live stage shows. Irwin Allen promised to keep the role of Riley for Hunt when he completed his military duties, but by the time he'd finished in Vietnam the show had ended, so he wasn't able to return. Over the years Hunt has worked as an actor and director, as a regular for two years on General Hospital, as a news anchor for CBS affiliate KGGM in Albuquerque, New Mexico in 1987 and in the late 1990s back on TV in shows such as Love Boat: The Next Wave and Charmed.

Hunt began teaching at Oak Park High School in the 2001-2002 schoolyear. He taught film and retired in 2022. When asked where he would go next, he responded, "I’ll probably go back to acting now, so you might have to see me on TV again."

== Partial filmography ==
- Dennis the Menace (TV) (Dennis at Boot Camp) (1962)
- Gunsmoke (TV) (Lover Boy) (1963) - Boy
- My Three Sons (TV) (Almost the Sound of Music) (1963) - Dennis
- Dr. Kildare (TV) (The Child Between) (1964) - Rusty
- Karen (TV) (No Boys Allowed) (1964) - Roger
- Perry Mason (TV) (two episodes) (1963–1964)
- The Munsters (TV) (Bats of a Feather) (1965) - Second G.I.
- The Donna Reed Show (TV) (three episodes) (1962–1965)
- Voyage to the Bottom of the Sea (TV) (second season regular character) (1965–1966) - Stuart Riley
- Ironside (TV) (Trip to Hashbury) (1968) - Gary
- Freaky Friday (1976) - Car Cop (uncredited)
- Miss Jones (TV) (1991) - Second Attorney
- Love Boat: The Next Wave (TV) (Captains Courageous) (1998) - Piano Player
- Charmed (TV) (Feats of Clay) (1999) - Auctioneer

== Stage Work ==
Actor

- Pleasure of His Company (with Lana Turner and Louis Jourdan)
- Your Own Thing
- Our Town (with Henry Fonda)
- Richard II (with Richard Chamberlain)
- Forty Carats (with June Lockhart)
- Everybody's Girl (with Rose Marie)

Director

- The Caine Mutiny Court-Martial
- Hello, Dolly!
- That Championship Season
- The Boys in Autumn (with Walter Koenig and Mark Lenard)
- The Student Prince
- Pirates of Penzance
- A Christmas Carol (Robert Hayes, Walter Koenig and Edd Hall)

== Awards ==
- Three Drama-Logue Awards:

The Caine Mutiny Court-Martial (1981)
Hello Dolly (1983)
That Championship Season (1988)
