= The Guinness Game =

- Created by: David Paradine/Hill-Eubanks Group
- Presented by: Bob Hilton; Don Galloway
- Announcer: Charlie O'Donnell; Tony McClay
- Country of origin: United States

Production
- Running time: 30 minutes

Original release
- Network: Syndicated
- Release: September 17, 1979 – September 1980

The Guinness Game is an American game show that aired in weekly syndication from September 17, 1979, to September 1980 for a total of 24 episodes. Bob Hilton was the host, later replaced by Don Galloway. The announcer was Charlie O'Donnell who was then later replaced by Tony McClay. One of the show's producers was Bob Eubanks.

== Gameplay ==
Three contestants were asked to predict if a live, record-breaking stunt could be performed or broken by guessing if they would succeed or fail. Each player began with $1,000 and could bet up to 90% of what they had. The player with the most money after three rounds kept it and played for a bonus prize by predicting whether the final stunt would succeed or fail. A player who placed a maximum bet on each stunt, and was correct all three times, would win $6,859.

All stunts that were completed successfully were entered into the next installment of The Guinness Book of World Records, hence the name of the show.

Two of the program's musical cues were recycled from other shows: one was the theme to The Money Maze and the other was Bean Bag, which is also the theme to the UK game show It's a Knockout. The show featured long time WABI-TV (Bangor, Maine) sportscaster Tim Throckmorton. He attempted to break the world coin snatching record.

== Closings ==
The Guinness Game is notable for the host's unprecedented sign-off: Hilton and Galloway both normally ended each episode by saying "We hope you join us when The Guinness Game returns in exactly 167 hours, 31 minutes and 15 seconds...and you can bet on that!" (the figures used varied with each airing); the length given translates to seven days minus 30 minutes, a unique way of saying "See you next week".
