= Guy Raymond =

American actor (1911–1997)

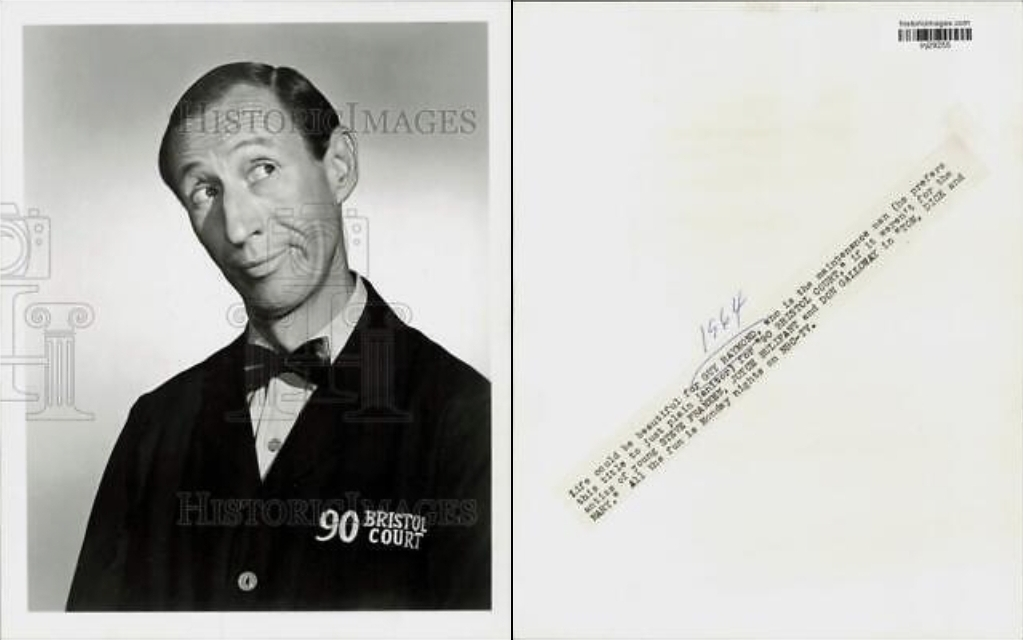
- Raymond in Tom, Dick, and Mary, 1964
- Born: Raymond W. Guyer; July 1, 1911; Niagara Falls, New York, U.S.
- Died: January 26, 1997 (aged 85); Santa Monica, California, U.S.
- Occupation: Actor
- Years active: 1926–1980
- Spouse: Ann Morgan Guilbert (m. 1969)

Guy Raymond (born Raymond W. Guyer; July 1, 1911 – January 26, 1997) was an American actor.

== Early life and career ==
When he was 15, Raymond debuted professionally as a comedy dancer. Before he became an actor, he danced for 14 years, sometimes performing solo and sometimes as part of a comedy dance team.

Raymond appeared in the films 4D Man, Sail a Crooked Ship, Gypsy, It Happened at the World's Fair, The Russians Are Coming, the Russians Are Coming, The Reluctant Astronaut, The Ballad of Josie, Wild in the Streets, Bandolero! and The Undefeated, among others.

On television, Raymond portrayed Cliff Murdock in Harris Against the World, Karen, and Tom, Dick and Mary. His Murdock character was the only one who appeared in all three of the programs.

In 1966 he guest-starred on Gunsmoke playing Dr. Tobias, a seller of herbs and medicines who also purported to be a rainmaker; called to duty while Dodge City was in the midst of its worst drought ever in “The Well” (S12E9).

From 1968 to 1970 he played Mr. Peevy, a local handyman in eleven episodes of The Ghost & Mrs. Muir.

On Broadway, he had the roles of Ulysses in Hook n' Ladder (1952) and George Herman in Pipe Dream (1955). He also acted in stock theater.

== Personal life and death ==
Raymond was married to actress Ann Morgan Guilbert. He died on January 26, 1997, in Santa Monica, California, at age 85.

== Filmography ==
=== Films ===
Year	Title	Role	Notes
1958	Marjorie Morningstar	Mr. Klabber	Uncredited
1959	4D Man	Fred the Guard	
1961	Sail a Crooked Ship	Helmut	
1962	Gypsy	Pastey	
1963	It Happened at the World's Fair	Barney Thatcher	
1966	The Russians Are Coming, the Russians Are Coming	Lester Tilly	
1967	The Ballad of Josie	Doc	
1967	The Reluctant Astronaut	Bert	
1968	Wild in the Streets	Dentist	Uncredited
1968	Bandolero!	Ossie Grimes	
1969	The Undefeated	Giles	

=== Television ===
Year	Title	Role	Notes
1954	The Web		
1954	Repertory Theatre	Mr. Burnside	
1954	Satins and Spurs	Tex	TV movie
1955	The Elgin Hour	Detective	
1955	Kraft Theatre		
1955	The People's Choice	Mr. Buckley	
1955–57	The United States Steel Hour	Various	3 episodes
1956	Goodyear Playhouse	Smitty	
1958	Omnibus	Stinker	
1959	Naked City	Various	2 episodes
1960	Maverick	Bartender	
1960	Dennis the Menace	Warehouseman	
1960–63	Route 66	Various	4 episodes
1961	The Untouchables	Injured bystander	
1961	The Asphalt Jungle	Tommy McAllister	
1961	Dr. Kildare	Kelsey	
1961	Rio	Abe	TV movie
1961–62	Ichabod and Me	Martin Perkins	5 episodes
1962	The Lloyd Bridges Show	Henry Thigpen	
1963	The Twilight Zone	Gibbons	Season 4, Episode 14: "Of Late I Think of Cliffordville"
1964	The Great Adventure	Wilson	
1964	Calhoun: County Agent	Simeon	TV movie
1964–65	90 Bristol Court: Karen	Cliff Murdock	2 episodes
1964–65	90 Bristol Court: Harris Against the World	Cliff Murdock	13 episodes
1964–65	90 Bristol Court: Tom, Dick, and Mary	Cliff Murdock	3 episodes
1965	The Dick Van Dyke Show	Horace	
1965–80	The Magical World of Disney	Ben Grissom / The Shadow	3 episodes
1963–66	Hazel	Various	3 episodes
1961–66	Gunsmoke	Various	3 episodes
1966	The Phyllis Diller Show	Montgomery	
1967	Peyton Place	Mr. Burrows	
1967	Star Trek	Trader	
1967–69	Green Acres	Various	4 episodes
1968–70	The Ghost & Mrs. Muir	Mr. Peevey	11 episodes
1969	Doc	Sheriff Bart	TV movie
1969	The Flim-Flam Man	Buck	Pilot
1969–70	The Beverly Hillbillies	Howard Hewes	2 episodes
1970	Here Come the Bridges	Amos Higgins	
1970	Headmaster	Mr. Kendall	
1971	The Virginian	Mapes	
1971	Alias Smith and Jones	Sheriff Carver	
1971	Eddie	Pasco	TV movie
1971	Love, American Style	Various	2 episodes
1973	Mannix	Old man	
1973	The New Dick Van Dyke Show	Uncle Jackie	
1974	Maude	Conductor	
1975	Queen of the Stardust Ballroom	Petie	TV movie
1975	Great Performances	Pop	
1975	America, You're On	Wallace Kirkeby	TV movie
1976	Little House on the Prairie	Conductor	
1976	Dynasty	McHenry	TV movie
1977	Lou Grant	Bailiff	
1978	Actor	Herman	TV movie
1979	Starstruck	Ezra Mccallister	TV movie
1979	B. J. and the Bear		
1980	Young Maverick		
1980	The Ghosts of Buxley Hall	Ben Grissom	TV movie

=== Stage ===
Year	Title	Role	Notes
1952	Hook N' Ladder	Ulysses	Royale Theatre, Broadway
1955	Pipe Dream	George Herman	Sam S. Shubert Theatre, Broadway
