= Bracken County High School =

Coordinates: 38°41′24″N 84°4′19″W

Location
- 350 W Miami St; Brooksville, Bracken County, KY, Kentucky 41004; United States

Information
- Former name: Brooksville High School
- School type: Public high school
- Motto: Building a better world, one student at a time
- School district: Bracken County Schools
- Principal: Jamey Johnson
- Teaching staff: 19.03 (FTE)
- Grades: 9-12
- Enrollment: 386 (2023–2024)
- Student to teacher ratio: 20.28
- Colors: Blue & White
- Athletics conference: KHSAA 10th Region, 39th District Class A
- Mascot: Polar Bears
- Website: https://hs.bracken.kyschools.us

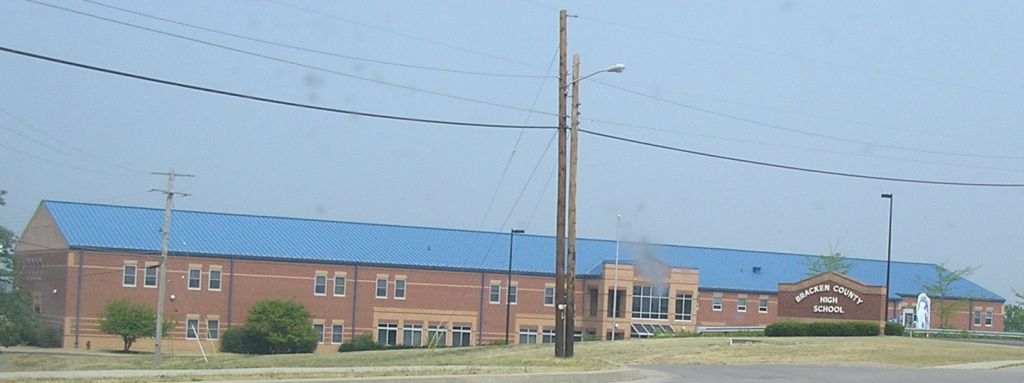

Bracken County High School is located in Brooksville, Kentucky, United States, and is part of the Bracken County school district. The school was founded as Brooksville High School. In 1947, the school changed its name to Bracken County High School.

== Athletics and clubs ==
Bracken County High School competes in the Kentucky High School Athletic Association.

=== Boys sports ===
Boys sports teams include basketball, baseball, cross country running, football, tennis, and track and field.

=== Girls sports ===
Girls sports teams include basketball, cross country running, fast-pitch softball, tennis, track and field, volleyball, and cheerleading.

=== Clubs ===
Clubs include academic team, art club, National Beta Club, choir, Future Business Leaders of America, Fellowship of Christian Athletes, Family, Career and Community Leaders of America, Future Educators Association, National FFA Organization, French club, Spanish club, yearbook club, archery, and 4-H

== Notable alumni ==
- Don Galloway, American stage, film and television actor
