= Joyce Bulifant =

American actress (born 1937)

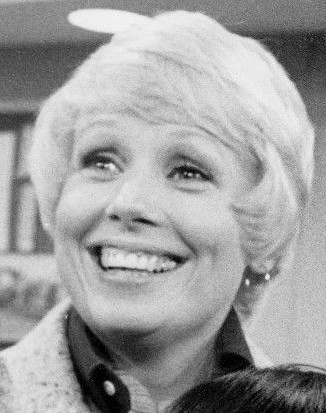
- Bulifant on a 1975 episode of The Mary Tyler Moore Show
- Born: Joyce Collins Bulifant; December 16, 1937 (age 88); Newport News, Virginia, U.S.
- Education: American Academy of Dramatic Arts
- Occupation: Actress
- Years active: 1959–present
- Known for: The Mary Tyler Moore Show; The Happiest Millionaire; Airplane!
- Spouses: James MacArthur (m. 1958; div. 1968) Edward Mallory (m. 1969; div. 1974) William Asher (m. 1976; div. 1993) Glade Bruce Hansen (m. 2000; div. 2001) Roger Perry (m. 2002; died 2018)
- Children: 3, including John Mallory Asher
- Awards: Palm Springs Walk of Stars

Joyce Collins Bulifant (born December 16, 1937) is an American actress and author. In addition to recurring roles on television, including The Mary Tyler Moore Show as Marie Slaughter, Bulifant is recognized for film roles in The Happiest Millionaire and Airplane! and as a frequent panelist on game shows, including Chain Reaction, Match Game, and Password Plus.

== Early years ==
Bulifant was born in Newport News, Virginia. She attended Solebury School in New Hope, Pennsylvania, graduating in 1956 in the same class as her first husband, James MacArthur, son of Helen Hayes and Charles MacArthur. She then studied acting at the American Academy of Dramatic Arts.

== Theatre ==
Bulifant's Broadway credits include Tall Story (1958) and The Paisley Convertible (1966). She also appeared onstage in Glad Tidings, Auntie Mame, Gentlemen, The Queens!, and Under the Yum-Yum Tree.

She has written and performed autobiographical shows, Life Upon the Wicked Stage and Remembering Helen Hayes with Love, about her former mother-in-law, Helen Hayes, as well as Lillian Gish.

== Television ==
=== Regular cast ===
One of Bulifant's earliest roles on television was as a dancer on Arthur Murray's Dance Party (1950–1960). She played Timmie Barnes in Too Young to Go Steady (1959), Mary Gentry in Tom, Dick and Mary (1964–1965), Marie Slaughter on The Mary Tyler Moore Show (1970–1977), Peggy Wilson on Love Thy Neighbor (1973), Lois on It's a Man's World (1962–1963), Marsha Patterson on The Bill Cosby Show (1969–1971), and Marjorie Martin on Big John, Little John (1976–1977). She was heard as the voice of Queen Vanda on the syndicated cartoon series Sport Billy (1982). She was also a regular on CBS’s Flo, as Flo’s best friend Miriam Willoughby from 1980 to 1981.

=== Guest appearances ===
Bulifant guest-starred as Jessica in Tales of Wells Fargo, episode "Fraud," in 1961, in addition to episodes of Channing; Empire; The Virginian; Bonanza; Gunsmoke; Wagon Train; Destry Rides Again; The Real McCoys; McHale's Navy; Dr. Kildare; Naked City; Police Woman; My Three Sons; Love, American Style; The Facts of Life; Harper Valley PTA; The Bad News Bears; Alice; Three's Company; The Joey Bishop Show; and The Donald O'Connor Show.

She played an intended murder victim in a 1961 episode of Boris Karloff's Thriller (episode: "An Attractive Family").

She starred opposite her future husband, Roger Perry, in a 1962 pilot for General Electric Theater called "The First Hundred Years" and with Eva Le Galliene in The Play of the Week's Thérèse Raquin. She played Jenny Logan, the incorruptible wife of Tom Logan, played by Frank Aletter, both of whom were being tempted by Mr. Lucifer, played by Fred Astaire, and Mr. Lucifer's assistant, Iris Hecate, played by Elizabeth Montgomery, in "Mr. Lucifer", a 1962 episode of Alcoa Presents.

She played innocent defendant Nancy Banks in the Perry Mason 1964 episode "The Case of the Ice-Cold Hands", the second of two appearances on that show.

She played Miriam Willoughby on Flo and David Spade's mother on Just Shoot Me!

From 1994 to 1997, she played Emily Wallace, the mother of her real-life son John Asher's character in Weird Science.

=== Television movies ===
Bulifant appeared in Hanging by a Thread, Better Late Than Never, Little Women, Charley's Aunt, and The Shining.

=== Game shows ===
Bulifant appeared as a frequent guest on game shows including Name That Tune, Password, Match Game, Crosswits, Tattletales, To Tell the Truth, $25,000 Pyramid, and Decisions Decisions, along with David Letterman.

=== The Brady Bunch ===
Bulifant was the original choice for the role of Carol Brady on ABC's The Brady Bunch, but the part ultimately went to Florence Henderson.

== Film ==
Bulifant's most popular film roles were as Rosemary in the Disney live-action feature The Happiest Millionaire, in which she sang "Bye-Yum Pum Pum", and in the 1980 comedy Airplane!

In Airplane!, Bulifant played the mother of a daughter in need of a heart transplant, played by Jill Whelan, in a nod to characters from Airport 1975. This was fitting, since Whelan had already begun playing Vicki Stubing on The Love Boat, the daughter of the Love Boat captain, played by Gavin MacLeod. MacLeod and Bulifant played a married couple on The Mary Tyler Moore Show. Airplane thus tied MacLeod's two TV families together.

She has twice been directed by her son, John Asher, in Diamonds and Tooken, and appeared in a comedic short, The Haircut, opposite John Cassavetes.

== Recognition ==
Bulifant received a Theatre World Award for 1961–1962 for her performance in Whisper to Me.

In 2014, she and her husband Roger Perry were honored with a Golden Palm Star on the Walk of Stars in Palm Springs, California.

== Personal life ==
Bulifant has been married five times:

- Her first husband was actor James MacArthur. They married on November 2, 1958, had two children together, Mary MacArthur and Charles MacArthur, and divorced in 1967.
- Her second husband was Days of Our Lives star Edward Mallory. They married on September 19, 1969, and had one child, John Mallory Asher. They divorced in 1974.
- Her third husband was TV director William Asher. He adopted her son John, giving him the last name of Asher. She and Asher married August 28, 1976, and divorced in 1993.
- Her fourth marriage was to Glade Bruce Hansen; they married in 2000 and divorced the next year.
- Her fifth husband was actor Roger Perry. They married in 2002 after he divorced his wife of many years, Jo Anne Worley, and remained wed until Perry's death on July 12, 2018.

Bulifant has a grandson, Evan Joseph Asher, from her son John's marriage to Jenny McCarthy.

== Advocacy ==
Bulifant discovered she had dyslexia in her 40s and has served as a longtime advocate for dyslexia research, including writing two musicals on the subject, Gifts of Greatness and Different Heroes, Different Dreams. Recipients of the Hans Christian Andersen Award, which Bulifant founded to recognize dyslexics who've made a positive contribution to society, include Stephen J. Cannell and Whoopi Goldberg. Bulifant herself is a recipient of the 2015 Broken Glass Award from The Dyslexia Foundation.

She has for many years been actively involved with the child abuse prevention nonprofit Childhelp, including serving as a Celebrity Ambassador and as a vice-president on the National Board of Directors.

She also advocates for autism research.

Her memoir, My Four Hollywood Husbands, details the alcoholism of four of her spouses and her recovery from codependent relationships.

== Filmography ==
=== Theatre ===
Year	Title	Character	Notes	ref
1959	Tall Story	Nancy	Written by Howard Lindsay and Russel Crouse; Suggested by the novel The Homecoming Game by Howard Nemerov; Featuring songs by Joe Hornsby, Ben G. Allen, and Jerry Teifer; Music arranged by Edward Thomas	
1967	The Paisley Convertible	Amy Rodgers	Understudies: Richard Hoffman (Charlie Rodgers, Ralph Keppleman), Jen Nelson (Meg Tynan) and Mary Rausch (Amy Rodgers, Sylvia Greer)	

=== Film ===
Year	Title	Character	Notes	ref
1967	The Happiest Millionaire	Rosemary	Musical film starring Fred MacMurray and based upon the true story of Philadelphia millionaire Anthony J. Drexel Biddle.	
1980	Airplane!	Mrs. Davis	Titled as Flying High! in Australia, New Zealand, South Africa, Japan and the Philippines	
1999	Diamonds	June	American comedy film directed by her son, Asher and written by Allan Aaron Katz.	
2005	Dirty Love	Mary	Written by and starring Jenny McCarthy and directed by her son, Asher.	
2010	Wreckage	Deputy Priest		
2015	Tooken	Edna Millers		
2019	I Hate Kids	Betty Bartlett		

=== Television ===
Year	Title	Character	Notes	ref
1961	The Play of the Week		Episode: "Therese Raquin" (S 2:Ep 24)	
1961	Naked City	Connie Hacker	Episode: "Take and Put" (S 2:Ep 32)	
1962	Thriller	Jinny Willis	Episode: "An Attractive Family" (S 2: Ep15)	
1962	General Electric Theater	Connie Duncan	Episode: "The First Hundred Years" (S 10:Ep 34)	
1962	Alcoa Premiere	Jenny Logan	Episode: "Mr. Lucifer" (S 2:Ep 5)	
1962	Gunsmoke	Ellie	Episode: "Uncle Sunday" (S 8:Ep 14)	
1963	My Three Sons	Rebecca Holly	Episode: "Flashback" (S 3:Ep 19)	
1963	Empire	Betty Wormser	Episode: "The Tiger Inside" (S 1:Ep 20)	
1963	Perry Mason	Hollis Wilburn	Episode: "The Case of the Surplus Suitor" (S 6:ep 19)	
1963	The Real McCoys	Barbara	Episode: "The Peacemakers" (S 6:Ep 36)	
1963	McHale's Navy	Lt. Georgianna Comstock	Episode: "Today I Am a Man!" (S 2:Ep 7)	
1964	The Virginian	Nancy Mayhew	Episode: "Roar from the Mountain" (S 2:Ep 16)	
1964	Perry Mason	Nancy Banks	Episode: "The Case of the Ice-Cold Hands" (S 7:Ep 16)	
1964	Arrest and Trial	Alice	Episode: "A Roll of the Dice" (S 1:Ep 22)	
1964	Destry	Sheba Hannibal	Episode: "Go Away, Little Sheba" (S 1:Ep 7)	
1964	Wagon Train	Julie	Episode: "The Michael Malone Story" (S 7:Ep 16)	
1964–65	Tom, Dick and Mary	Mary Gentry	Part of the umbrella title of a short-lived NBC experiment comprising three situation comedies set in a Southern California apartment complex located at the 90 Bristol Court address.	
1966	Dr. Kildare	Judy Cannon	Recurring	
1968	The Woody Woodbury Show	Herself	Episodes: "February 20, 1968" (S 1:Ep 127); "July 2, 1968" (S 1:Ep 223)	
1969	Lancer	Cassie	Episode: "Angel Day And Her Sunshine Girls" (S 1:Ep 19)	
1969–71	The Bill Cosby Show	Mrs. Patterson	Main cast	
1970	Bonanza	Bonnie	Episode: "Return Engagement" (S 11:Ep 22)	
1971–77	The Mary Tyler Moore Show	Marie Slaughter	Recurring	
1973	Love Thy Neighbor	Peggy Wilson	Main cast; American remake of the British sitcom Love Thy Neighbour on the ABC Network.	
1973	Love, American Style		Episode: "Love and the Awkward Age" {S 5:Ep 49)	
1973–82	Match Game	Herself	Semi-regular panelist	
1974	Tattletales	Herself	Episode: "March 18, 1974" (S 1:Ep 5)	
1974	The Michele Lee Show	Gladys Gooch	Pilot (S 1:Ep 1); Only the pilot episode was aired and the series did not proceed on CBS.	
1974	Sierra	Shirley	Episode: "Taking Cody Winslow" (S 1:Ep 3)	
1974	Police Woman	Peggy Lakes	Episode: "Warning: All Wives..." (S 1:Ep 3)	
1975–77	Match Game PM	Herself	Semi-Regular Panelist	
1976	Police Story	Katie Pardnales	Episode: "Monster Manor" (S 4:Ep 8)	
1976	Big John, Little John	Marjorie Martin	Recurring	
1977	$20,000 Pyramid	Herself	Episode: "Joyce Bulifant & David Doyle" (S 6:Ep 11)	
1977	Three's Company	Mrs. Cross	Episode: "Chrissy's Date" (S 2:Ep 5)	
1978	$20,000 Pyramid	Herself	Episode: "Joyce Bulifant & Ron Glass" (S 6:Ep 26)	
1978	Alice	Connie Raymond	Episode: "Who Ordered the Hot Turkey?" (S 3:Ep 9)	
1979	Turnabout	9-months-expectant mother	Episode: "We're a Little Late, Folks" (S 1:Ep 3)	
1979	The Bad News Bears	Alice	Episodes: "Three's a Crowd" (S 1:Ep 9); "Wedding Bells, part 1" (S 2: Ep 2)	
1979	The Misadventures of Sheriff Lobo	Guest	Episode: "Disco Fever Comes To Orly" (S 1:Ep 4)	
1979–81	Password Plus	Herself	Recurring	
1980	Chain Reaction	Herself	Celebrity guest	
1980–81	Flo	Miriam Willoughby	Spin-off of Alice.	
1982	Harper Valley PTA	Guest	Episode: "The Return Of Charlie's Chow Palace" (S 2:Ep 16}	
1980–81	Sport Billy	Sport Lilly/Queen Vanda		
1985	The Facts of Life	Margaret	Episode: "Teacher, Teacher" (S 7:Ep 4)	
1987	American Playhouse	Miss Delahay	Episode: "Charley's Aunt" (S 6:Ep 14)	
1994–97	Weird Science	Emily Wallace	Recurring	
1999	E! True Hollywood Story	Herself	Episode: "The Brady Bunch" (S 3:Ep 21)	
2001	Just Shoot Me!	Fantasia 'Fanny' Olivia Finch	Episode: "Fanny Finch" (S 5:Ep19)	
