= Bernadette Withers =

American actress (1946–2019)

- Withers in Karen, 1965
- Born: February 5, 1946; Los Angeles, California, U.S.
- Died: October 25, 2019 (aged 73); Dana Point, California
- Occupation: Actress
- Spouses: Michael Bruce Cook (m. 1969; div. 1972); William Tucker Lynch (m. 1972; div. 1984)
- Children: 2

Bernadette Withers (February 5, 1946 – October 25, 2019) was an American actress best known for playing Ginger on Bachelor Father, Janis on Karen, and Valerie in The Trouble with Angels. Some sources claim that actress Jane Withers was her aunt, but since Jane Withers had no siblings she did not have any nieces.

== Acting career ==
As a child Bernadette Withers began acting in small uncredited film roles, including a child at an audition in I'll Cry Tomorrow (1955), and parts in Stranger at My Door (1956) and All Fall Down (1962). She went on to play Valerie in The Trouble with Angels (1966).

Withers found guest-starring roles in numerous television series. On Leave It to Beaver she played Kitty in Wally’s Glamour Girl (Season 4, Episode 10), and on Wagon Train she played Alma Hardy in The Jonas Murdock Story (Season 3, Episode 27). She was also in Buffalo Bill, Jr., Father Knows Best, My Three Sons, and The Adventures of Ozzie and Harriet.

From 1957 to 1962 Withers had the recurring role of Ginger, Kelly’s best friend, in Bachelor Father. During the program’s five seasons Ginger had two different sets of parents, and three last names – Farrel, Loomis and Mitchell. During the 1964 television season she had the recurring role of Janis on Karen.

== Later life ==
After her acting career ended Withers became a partner in a software company. She was married twice, and had two children. She died in Dana Point, California, on October 25, 2019.
