= Susan McGinnis =

Susan McGinnis is an American television journalist. From 2000 to 2008 she worked as a correspondent for CBS news, working on the MarketWatch and The Early Show programs.

In 2008 she became the lead anchor and managing editor at Clean Skies News and continued as the show was rebranded to be called Energy Now in October 2010. In February 2011, McGinnis left Energy Now to become a freelance journalist. That led her back to CBS News as a correspondent.

She graduated from the University of Delaware in 1986. Playboy magazine readers named her a "Bear Market Babe" for her business reporting. And McGinnis's hairstyle earned her the first four Crown Awards for "Best Bangs" from voters at the celebrity hair website Super-Hair.Net, between 2001 and 2004.

== Personal life ==
McGinnis is a long-distance runner who has trained with Michael Greenblatt.
