= Steve Franken =

American actor (1932–2012)

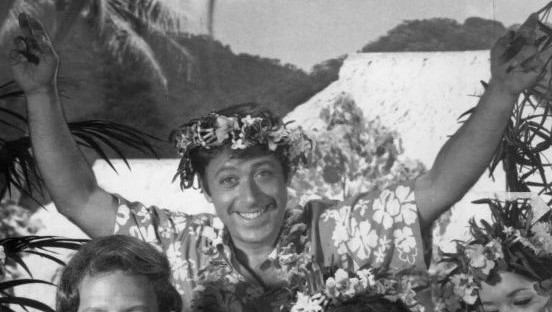
- Franken in an unsold 1970 television pilot Three for Tahiti
- Born: Stephen Robert Franken; May 27, 1932; Queens, New York, U.S.
- Died: August 24, 2012 (aged 80); Canoga Park, California, U.S.
- Occupation: Actor
- Years active: 1958–2012
- Spouses: Julia E. Carter (m. 1965; div. 1986) Jean Garrett (m. 1987)
- Children: 3

Stephen Robert Franken (May 27, 1932 – August 24, 2012) was an American actor who worked in film and television for over fifty years.

== Early life and career ==
Franken was born in Queens, New York. He earned his B.A. from Cornell University, and returned to New York to pursue acting rather than realize his parents' dreams for a medical career.

Franken's first screen role was in 1958 as Willie in the episode "The Time of Your Life" on the anthology series Playhouse 90.

Producer Rod Amateau saw him in a Los Angeles stage production of Say, Darling and cast him as playboy dilettante Chatsworth Osborne Jr. on the sitcom The Many Loves of Dobie Gillis, starring Dwayne Hickman. Franken appeared as a recurring guest in numerous episodes from 1960 to 1963. He attributed the character's look of pained condescension to an ulcer he had suffered since the age of 14 when his mother had died.

Another early role was as Bully in the 1961 episode "The Pit" of the series The Rebel, starring Nick Adams. He played the lead guest-starring role in the 1961 episode "The Case of Willie Betterley" in Lock-Up. In 1962, he was cast as Dunc Tomilson in "The Yacht-Club Gang" on Checkmate. He appeared as Jerry Allen in two episodes of Mr. Novak. In 1964, he appeared in The Time Travelers. In 1965, he appeared in "Birth of a Salesman" on McHale's Navy, and in "Tim and Tim Again" on My Favorite Martian.

He appeared in 1964 on Petticoat Junction as the son of the villain, Homer Bedloe in "Bedloe and Son". He played another rich wastrel on the short-lived sitcom Tom, Dick and Mary. Franken appeared in the famous 1963 Perry Mason episode "The Case of the Deadly Verdict" (in which Mason actually loses a case, at least initially) as Christopher Barton.

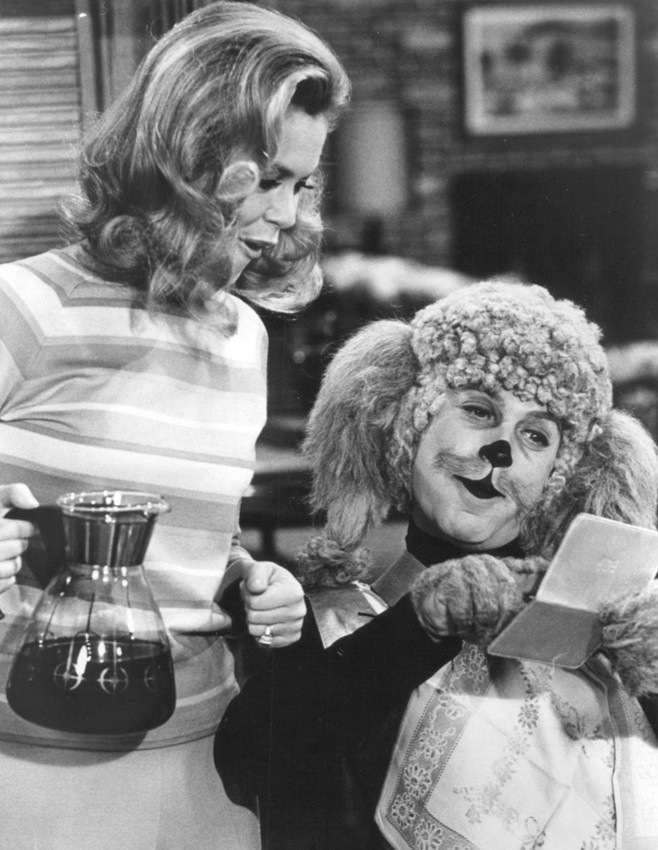
Franken with Elizabeth Montgomery in Bewitched

Immediately after Dobie Gillis was cancelled, Franken was cast as Lieutenant Samwell "Sanpan" Panosian in the Gary Lockwood series The Lieutenant episode "To Take Up Serpents", the first television series created by Gene Roddenberry. He played other military roles, such as a decorated U.S. flier turned arms-dealer and traitor in "The Gun Runner Raid" episode of The Rat Patrol and as a P.O.W. lieutenant in Follow Me, Boys!. From 1966 to 1971, he appeared in various roles in at least six episodes of Bewitched.

Franken appeared as the drunken waiter Levinson in the 1968 Blake Edwards film The Party, alongside Peter Sellers. One journalist, writing on the fortieth anniversary of the film, stated:

Rivaling Sellers with one of The Party's stand-out performances: Steve Franken as the increasingly inebriated butler, slathering on a layer of slapstick to the proceedings with his incontinent antics. Franken's interaction with his vexed supervisor, his drunken stroll through the shallow indoor pool, his struggle to rescue the roast chicken perched precariously atop a bewigged socialite's bouffant hairdo: all comedy gold.

In 1970, he starred with Jerry Lewis in the comedy film Which Way to the Front?

From 1970 to 1973, he appeared five times on Love, American Style. He appeared as Officer Albert Porter in three episodes of Adam-12 from 1971 to 1972 as well as Ralph Salisbury in the 1971 episode "The Ferret." In 1972, he appeared as Jonas Lasser on the season three episode "The Courtship of Mary's Father's Daughter" on The Mary Tyler Moore Show.

He appeared on Barney Miller in 1975 (episode: "The Arsonist") and again in 1981 (episode: "Resignation"). In 1979, he starred as Tom Voorhies alongside Michael Constantine in Disney's The North Avenue Irregulars. He appeared with Peter Sellers in 1980's The Fiendish Plot of Dr. Fu Manchu.

He acted and directed in various episodes of Insight. He appeared in small roles in such contemporary television series as Murphy Brown, The King of Queens and Seinfeld. From 2002 to 2003, he provided voices for Law & Order computer games. He voiced Professor Eugene Atwater in the animated series Road Rovers.

He voice-acted as Rundle in the 1993 Batman: The Animated Series episode "The Mechanic" and was Mr. Beal in Detention episodes "Little Miss Popular" and "Comedy of Terrors" (both 1999). The following year, he voiced the role of Mr. Janus in the episode "Grounded" of Static Shock and provided voices in Smurfs (1981), The Adventures of Don Coyote and Sancho Panda (1990), and Spawn (1997).

== Death ==
Franken died on August 24, 2012, at a nursing and rehabilitation center in Canoga Park, California, of complications from cancer, at the age of 80. He had three daughters, two from his first marriage to Julia Carter, and one from his second marriage to Jean Garrett. He was a second cousin of actor and politician Al Franken.

== Filmography ==
=== Film ===
Year	Film	Role	Notes
1958	Stage Struck	Dressing Room Well-Wisher	uncredited
1958	Cop Hater	Boy in Lineup	
1964	The Americanization of Emily	Young Sailor	
1964	The Time Travelers	Danny McKee	
1966	Wild Wild Winter	John	
1966	Follow Me, Boys!	P.O.W. Lieutenant	
1968	Panic in the City	Hal Johnson	
1968	The Party	Levinson	
1969	Angel in My Pocket	Zimmerman	
1969	Number One	Robin	
1970	Which Way to the Front?	Peter Bland	
1972	Every Man Needs One	Bob Rasmussen	Television film
1973	Voyage of the Yes	Doctor	Television film
1973	The Stranger	Henry Maitland	Television film
1973	Westworld	Technician	
1974	Houston, We've Got a Problem	Shimon Levin	Television film
1975	The Last Survivors	Don West	Television film
1975	The Reincarnation of Peter Proud	Dr. Charles Crennis	
1975	Sky Heist	Traffic Controller	Television film
1975	Murder on Flight 502	Donald Goldman	Television film
1975	I Wonder Who's Killing Her Now?	Harold Booker Esquire	
1976	Kiss Me, Kill Me	Murry Tesko	Television film
1976	The Missouri Breaks	The Lonesome Kid	
1977	It Happened at Lakewood Manor	Lionel White	Television film
1978	Avalanche	Henry McDade	
1978	Zuma Beach	Rick	Television film
1978	Terror Out of the Sky	Paul Gladstone	Television film
1979	The North Avenue Irregulars	Tom Voories	
1980	Hardly Working	Steve Torres	
1980	There Goes the Bride	Church Organist	
1980	The Fiendish Plot of Dr. Fu Manchu	Pete Williams	
1980	The Ghosts of Buxley Hall	Virgil Quinby	Television film
1982	Not Just Another Affair	Dr. Morton Schiller	Television film
1983	Curse of the Pink Panther	Harvey Hamilcard III	
1983	High School U.S.A.	Dr. Fritz Hauptmann	Television film
1984	The Sheriff and the Astronaut	FBI Agent Henley	Television film
1985	The Fourth Wise Man	Pharisee #1	Television film
1985	There Were Times, Dear	Harry	Television film
1987	Can't Buy Me Love	Moda Clerk	
1988	Bring Me the Head of Dobie Gillis	Chatsworth Osborne, Jr.	Television film
1988	Freeway	Lawyer	
1989	Transylvania Twist	Hans Hupp	
1991	Never Forget	Dan Greenspan	Television film
1993	Breakfast of Aliens	Fred	
1994	Munchie Strikes Back	Professor Graves	
1998	The Pandora Project	Sam Davis	
1999	Restraining Order	Jerry	
1999	The Omega Code	Jeffries	
2000	Nurse Betty	Administrator	
2000	Agent Red	General Socka	
2001	The Trumpet of the Swan	Bud	Voice
2001	Crash Point Zero	Stuart Elliott	
2005	The Works	Gordon	
2007	The Metrosexual	Professor	
2009	Angels & Demons	Cardinal Colbert	
2010	Watch Out for Slick	Emory	

=== Television ===
Year	Title	Role	Notes
1958	Decoy	Bar Patron	Episode: "Saturday Lost"
1958	Playhouse 90	Willie	Episode: "The Time of Your Life"
1960	Deadline	Copy Boy	Episode: "To Move a Mountain"
1960–1963	The Many Loves of Dobie Gillis	Chatsworth Osborne, Jr.	Recurring role
1961	Alcoa Presents: One Step Beyond	Crazed Soldier	Episode: "Night of Decision"
1961	The Rebel	Ruck	Episode: "The Pit"
1961	Assignment: Underwater	Carstairs	Episode: "Witness from the Dead"
1961	Lock-Up	Willie Betterley	Episode: "The Case of Willie Betterley"
1962	Checkmate	Dunc Tomilson	Episode: "The Yacht-Club Gang"
1962	Dr. Kildare	Freddie Binns	Episode: "Operation: Lazarus"
1962	Ensign O'Toole	Ensign Clifford Bender	Episode: "Operation: Gaslight"
1963	Perry Mason	Christopher Barton	Episode: "The Case of the Deadly Verdict"
1963	The Lieutenant	Lieutenant Sam Panosian	Episode: "To Take Up Serpents"
1963	Beetle Bailey	Lieutenant Forbes	Episode: "Psychological Testing"
1963-1964	Mr. Novak	Jerry Allen	Recurring role
1964	Petticoat Junction	Homer Bedloe Jr.	Episode: "Bedloe and Son"
1964-1965	Tom, Dick and Mary	Dr. Dick Moran	Recurring role
1965	The Patty Duke Show	Bob	Episode: "Sick in Bed"
1965	McHale's Navy	Lieutenant Jason Whitworth	Episode: "Birth of a Salesman"
1965	Please Don't Eat the Daisies	Crawford	Episode: "Two Seats on the Moon Shot"
1965	The Farmer's Daughter	Bellboy	Episode: "Crisis at Crystal Springs"
1965	My Favorite Martian	George	Episode: "Tim and Tim Again"
1966	Tammy	Crazy Wolf	Episode: "Two for Tee Pee"
1966	The Patty Duke Show	Ronald Dawson	Episode: "Do You Trust Your Daughter?"
1966	The Wild Wild West	Le Fou	Episode: "The Night of the Bottomless Pit"
1966	That Girl	Actor Playing Dr. Bruce Alden	Episode: "Soap Gets in Your Eyes"
1966	The Long, Hot Summer		Episode: "Carlotta, Come Home"
1966	The Rat Patrol	Ned Cunningham	Episode: "The Gun Runner Raid"
1966	Bewitched	George Barkley	Episode: "Follow That Witch"
1966	Bewitched	Hawkins	Episode: "A Gazebo Never Forgets"
1967	Batman	Rudy, the Valet	Episode: "That Darn Catwoman"
1967	T.H.E. Cat	Carl Leandro	Episode: "Matter Over Mind"
1967	My Three Sons	Al Morgan	Episode: "The Sky Is Falling"
1967	Mission: Impossible	Akim Hadramut	Episode: "The Slave"
1968	The Second Hundred Years	Corporal	Episode: "Luke and Comrade Tanya"
1968	The Outsider	Roger Edgeway	Episode: "What Flowers Daisies Are"
1968	The Big Valley	Bank Teller	Episode: "Hell Hath No Fury"
1968	Blondie	David Dithers	Episode: "Once Upon a Guru"
1968	Bewitched	Orvis	Episode: "Samantha's Secret Saucer"
1968	Bewitched	Juke	Episode: "Darrin Gone! and Forgotten?"
1969	My Friend Tony		Episode: "The Hazing"
1969	The Mod Squad	Rabbi Elliott Tannenbaum	Episode: "In This Corner - Sol Alpert"
1969	Bewitched	Cousin Henry	Episode: "Samantha's Shopping Spree"
1970	Night Gallery	Dr. Peter Mitchell	Episode: "The House"
1970-1973	Love, American Style	Various roles	5 episodes
1970-1979	Insight	Various roles	6 episodes
1971	Marcus Welby, M.D.	Dr. Weitzman	Episode: "A Passing of Torches"
1971	Bewitched	Bruce	Episode: "Samantha and the Loch Ness Monster"
1971	Adam-12	Ralph Salisbury	Episode: "The Ferret"
1972	Owen Marshall, Counselor at Law	Kurt Balks	Episode: "The Trouble with Ralph"
1972	Adam-12	Officer Albert Porter	2 episodes
1972	Norman Corwin Presents		Episode: "Odyssey in Progress"
1972	The Mary Tyler Moore Show	Jonas Lasser	2 episodes
1974	The Rookies	Alvin Conrad	Episode: "Key Witness"
1974	Sierra	Tommy	Episode: "Taking Cody Winslow"
1974	Emergency!	Bernard Goldberg	Episode: "Daisy's Pick Blind Date"
1975	Kolchak: The Night Stalker	Neil	Episode: "Chopper"
1975	Police Story	D.A. Wallberger	2 episodes
1975	Barney Miller	Edward Foreman	Episode: "The Arsonist"
1976	Doc	Harvey Kramer	Episode: "Oldies but Goodies"
1976	Good Heavens	Mr. Dee	Episode: "See Jane Run"
1976	Holmes & Yoyo	Jerry	Episode: "Funny Money"
1977	Man from Atlantis	Doctor	Episode: "Man from Atlantis"
1977	Lanigan's Rabbi	Will Stopes	Episode: "The Cadaver in the Clutter"
1977	Charlie's Angels	Fred Olsen	Episode: "Pretty Angels All in a Row"
1977	Petticoat Affair	Milton	Episode: "A Party for the Captain"
1977	C.P.O. Sharkey	Dr. Simon	Episode: "Sharkey Files Over the Cuckoo's Nest"
1977	Police Woman	Clerk	Episode: "Do You Still Beat Your Wife?"
1978	Police Woman	J.P. Thompson	Episode: "Murder with Pretty People"
1978	Kojak	Arnie Goldman	Episode: "May the Horse Be with You"
1978	Quincy, M.E.	Dr. Kitei	Episode: "The Last Six Hours"
1978	Alice	Holdup Man	Episode: "Better Never Than Late"
1978	CHiPs	Student Driver	Episode: "Crash Diet"
1979	Kaz		Episode: "Kazinski Versus Bennett"
1979	Supertrain		Episode: "The Queen and the Improbable Knight"
1979	One Day at a Time	Victor Mulhern	Episode: "The Piano Teacher"
1980	Disneyland	Virgil Quinby	Episode: "The Ghosts of Buxley Hall"
1980	Trapper John, M.D.	Bernie Chalmers	Episode: "Slim Chance"
1981	Barney Miller	Edward Novak	Episode: "Resignation"
1981	The Love Boat	Harry Mason	2 episodes
1982	CHiPs	Alan Drummond	Episode: "Force Seven"
1982	Trapper John, M.D.	Patient	Episode: "Three on a Mismatch"
1982	Simon & Simon	Tunridge	Episode: "The Ten Thousand Dollar Deductible"
1983	Ryan's Four		Episode: "Ryan's Four"
1983	Fantasy Island	Wes Perry	Episode: "The Wedding Picture/Castaways"
1984	The Smurfs	Additional voices	Episode: "Symbols of Wisdom/Blue Eyes Returns"; uncredited
1984	Jessie	Mr Anderson	Episode: "The Psychic Connection"
1985	Diff'rent Strokes	Mr. Anderson	Episode: "Arnold Saves the Squirrel"
1985	Hill Street Blues	Arnold Solomon	Episode: "Queen for a Day"
1985	MacGyver	Walt, the Pilot	Episode: "Last Stand"
1985	Hotel	Carmondy	Episode: "Echoes"
1986	On Wings of Eagles	Mort Myerson	Miniseries
1986	Our House	Forrester	Episode: "See You in Court"
1987	One Big Family	Dickie Tyler	Episode: "Stagestruck"
1987	Rags to Riches'	Dennis Baxter	Episode: "Born to Ride"
1987	Small Wonder	Doctor	Episode: "Everyone Into the Pool"
1988	Freddy's Nightmares	Mr. Birdwell	Episode: "Killer Instinct"
1989	Freddy's Nightmares	Mr. Sexton	Episode: "Silence Is Golden"
1989	Hunter	Lou	Episode: "The Legion"
1990	The Adventures of Don Coyote and Sancho Panda	Additional voices	Episode: "Pity the Poor Pirate"
1990	China Beach	Judge Julius H. Hoffman	Episode: "The Call"
1992	Harry and the Hendersons	Dr. J	Episode: "The Girl Who Cried Bigfoot"
1992	Human Target	Quentin Firth	Episode: "Designed by Chance"
1993	Batman: The Animated Series	Rundle	Voice, episode: "The Mechanic"
1994	Herman's Head	Mr. Prescott	Episode: "Bedtime for Hermo"
1994	Sisters	Huey Short	Episode: "Heroes"
1995	ER	Hank Travis	Episode: "Full Moon, Saturday Night"
1996	The Young and the Restless	Dr. Everhart	1 episode
1996	Sparks	Judge	Episode: "Porky's Revenge"
1996-1997	Road Rovers	Professor Eugene Atwater	Voice, 2 episodes
1997-1999	Todd McFarlane's Spawn	Additional voices	Recurring role
1998	The Sylvester & Tweety Mysteries	President Generic	Voice, episode: "Spooker of the House"
1998	Seinfeld	Brendan	Episode: "The Maid"
1998	Murphy Brown	College Roommate	Episode: "Dial and Substance"
1998	Maggie Winters	Mr. Addison	Episode: "Dinner at Rachel's"
1999	Detention	Mr. Beal	Voice, 2 episodes
2000	Chicken Soup for the Soul	Mr. Bellinger	Episode: "A Mason-Dixon Memory"
2000	Static Shock	Mr. Janus	Voice, episode: "Grounded"
2001	Family Law	Teacher	Episode: "Obligations"
2005	The Comeback		Episode: "Valerie Stands Out on the Red Carpet"
2005	The King of Queens	Vasili	Episode: "Move Doubt"
2006	Threshold	Graham Bolton	Episode: "Alienville"
2012	The Jeff Lewis 5 Minute Comedy Hour	Father	Episode: "Deathbed"
