= Harris Against the World =

1960s American television sitcom

- Jack Klugman in Harris Against the World.
- Genre: Sitcom
- Starring: Jack Klugman; Patricia Barry
- Composer: Jack Marshall
- Country of origin: United States
- Original language: English
- No. of seasons: 1
- No. of episodes: 13

Production
- Producers: Joe Connelly; Devery Freeman
- Running time: 22–24 minutes
- Production companies: Kayro-Vue Productions; Universal Television

Original release
- Network: NBC
- Release: October 5, 1964 – January 4, 1965

Jack Klugman, Patricia Barry, and David Macklin in Harris Against the World.

Harris Against the World, also known as 90 Bristol Court: Harris Against the World, is an American sitcom that stars Jack Klugman in the title role of Alan Harris as the superintendent of a large Hollywood movie studio who is frustrated with most things in his life. It aired from 1964 to 1965.

== Synopsis ==
Alan Harris, along with his wife Kate and children Dee Dee and Billy, lives at 90 Bristol Court, a fashionable apartment complex in Los Angeles, California. Harris is the plant superintendent at a large Hollywood movie studio. Kate is a spendthrift who always finds Harris second jobs to work part-time to pay the bills — taking up what little spare time he has — and his two children are very active and hard for him to keep up with. Harris is frustrated and overwhelmed by the many challenges he faces in his life, both at work and at home, and is prone to complaining about them, although underneath it all, he is a good and soft-hearted person. Helen and Norm Miller are Harris's good friends, and Cliff Murdock is the superintendent and handyman at 90 Bristol Court who frequently greets residents and visitors as they come and go at the apartment complex.

== Cast ==
- Alan Harris — Jack Klugman
- Kate Harris — Patricia Barry
- Dee Dee Harris — Claire Wilcox
- Billy Harris — David Macklin
- Helen Miller — Fay DeWitt
- Norm Miller — Sheldon Allman
- Cliff Murdock — Guy Raymond

== 90 Bristol Court ==
Harris Against the World was one of three 30-minute situation comedies — along with Karen, aired immediately before it, and Tom, Dick and Mary immediately after it — broadcast Monday nights under the umbrella title 90 Bristol Court. Despite all three shows being set at the same Los Angeles apartment complex with the address 90 Bristol Court, the only connection the three series had was the character of handyman Cliff Murdock (portrayed by Guy Raymond), who greeted the residents and visitors to 90 Bristol Court. After the last episodes of Harris Against the World and Tom, Dick and Mary aired on January 4, 1965, 90 Bristol Court ceased to be a programming entity. Although Karen continued to air after the demise of the other two series as a stand-alone show, handyman Murdock disappeared from Karen along with the 90 Bristol Court concept.

== Production ==
Harris Against the World was produced by Kayro-Vue and Universal Television, which also produced The Munsters for CBS that season. Thirteen black-and-white episodes were produced.

== Broadcast history ==
Harris Against the World premiered on NBC on October 5, 1964, and aired at 8:00 p.m. on Monday throughout its run. It drew low ratings — for the November-to-December 1964 reporting period, the Nielsen ratings ranked it 91st among the 96 prime-time network television shows — and was the least-watched of the three 90 Bristol Court series, although Karen and Tom, Dick and Mary did little better. In mid-November 1964 The New York Times reported that NBC planned to cancel both Harris Against the World and Tom, Dick and Mary, effective in early January 1965. Harris Against the World thus lasted only half a season, and the 13th and final episode aired on January 4, 1965.

Peter Tewksbury wrote, produced, and directed all three episodes that aired as part of 90 Bristol Court on November 23, 1964, and used the philosophy of Henry David Thoreau regarding simple living as a starting point for each of them: On Karen, Thoreau influenced Karen and her complicated love life when she mistakenly made three dates for the same Saturday night; on Harris Against the World, Thoreau inspired Harris to take his family fishing, only to find that he has to renew his driver's license that day; and on Tom, Dick and Mary, Dick used Thoreau's philosophy as he attempted to fix several broken household appliances.

== Episodes ==
No.	Title	Original release date
1	"Harris Against His Secretary"	October 5, 1964
Harris is horrified to discover that a report he needs to submit to his superiors at the movie studio has not been typed because his secretary has eloped. Guest stars: Hope Holiday, Madge Blake, and Alan Reed.
2	"Harris Against His Family"	October 12, 1964
The Harrises plan to make Kate’s handsome, successful college boyfriend, bachelor Gregg Albright, wish he were a happily married family man like Harris. Guest star: Elliott Reid.
3	"Harris Against the Old Rah-Rah"	October 19, 1964
Harris's boyhood archrival comes to town, reviving their old sports rivalry. Guest star: Hans Conried.
4	"Harris Against His Dancing Teacher"	October 26, 1964
As a wedding anniversary surprise, Harris buys a mink stole for Kate and signs up for dancing lessons for himself — but the lessons lead to trouble with Kate. Guest stars: Joyce Jameson and Hal Baylor.
5	"Harris Against Kid Parties"	November 2, 1964
Harris must attend to children at Dee Dee's birthday party before he can head to an important golf match. Guest stars: Michael Blake and Hugh Sanders.
6	"Harris Against Sundays"	November 9, 1964
Harris finds that the only way he can have a relaxed Sunday is to leave 90 Bristol Court and get away from guests who drop by.
7	"Harris Against Aunt Cora"	November 16, 1964
Kate's Aunt Cora hasn't spoken to the Harrises since their wedding 17 years ago, but Harris thinks he can still patch things up with her. Guest stars: Ruth Donnelly, Vaughn Taylor, and Ross Elliott.
8	"Harris Against the Simple Life Peter Tewksbury Peter Tewksbury"	November 23, 1964
The philosophy of Henry David Thoreau inspires Harris to take his family on a fishing trip, but on the day of the trip he discovers it is the deadline for him to renew his driver's license.
9	"Harris Against the Studio"	November 30, 1964
Harris invites movie star Press Diller to a quiet gathering at the Harris apartment at 90 Bristol Court, but when the word gets out that Diller will be there, the guest list begins to grow. Guest star: Peter Mann.
10	"Harris Against the Stock Market"	December 7, 1964
Harris gives a stock market tip to some friends, and they appoint him to buy the stock.
11	"Harris Against His Housekeeper"	December 14, 1964
Kate hires a new maid who works out just fine, except that she dislikes men — and cannot stand Harris. Guest star: Kathleen Freeman.
12	"Harris Against His Son, the Drop-Out"	December 28, 1965
Billy announces that he is quitting high school, and Harris wants to convince him not to — so Harris gets him a job.
13	"Harris Against Anniversary Gifts"	January 4, 1965
Harris frantically races to exchange an anniversary gift and still be on time for the anniversary party. Guest stars: Jacques Aubuchon, Patty Regan, Howard McNear, John Hart, and Bill McLean.
