= Karen (1964 TV series) =

1960s American television sitcom

- Genre: Situation comedy
- Created by: Joe Connelly; Bob Mosher
- Directed by: Earl Bellamy
- Starring: Debbie Watson; Richard Denning; Mary LaRoche; Gina Gillespie
- Theme music composer: Jack Marshall; Bob Mosher
- Opening theme: "Karen", performed by the Beach Boys
- Composer: Jack Marshall
- Country of origin: United States
- Original language: English
- No. of seasons: 1
- No. of episodes: 28

Production
- Producers: Joe Connelly; Bob Mosher
- Running time: 22–24 minutes
- Production companies: Kayro-Vue Productions; Universal Television

Original release
- Network: NBC
- Release: October 5, 1964 – April 19, 1965

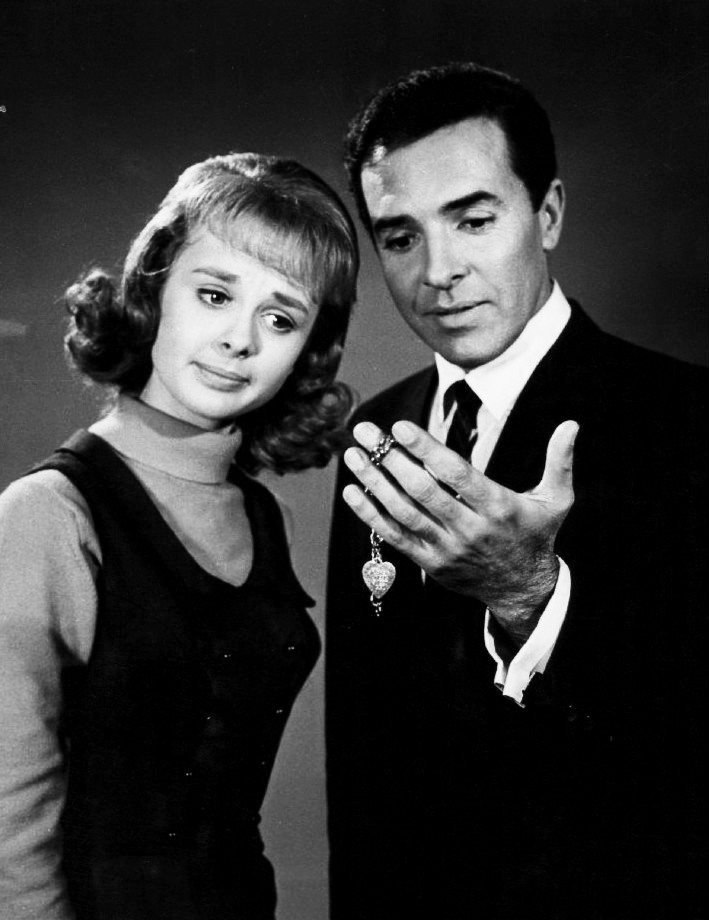
Karen (Debbie Watson) thinks one of her teachers (Miguel Landa) is the mystery person who sent her an expensive bracelet, in the 1965 episode "Who's Seymour?"

Karen is an American sitcom that stars Debbie Watson in the title role of 16-year-old Karen Scott, and Gina Gillespie as her tomboyish little sister Mimi. It aired from 1964 to 1965.

== Synopsis ==
Karen centers on the social life of 16-year old Karen Scott, a typical mid-1960s American teenager who lives in a fashionable apartment complex at 90 Bristol Court in Los Angeles, California, with her tomboyish younger sister Mimi and parents Steve and Barbara. Karen and the impish Mimi are a counterpoint to one another, each girl confounding the tolerant and loving Steve and Barbara in her own way. Karen is focused on having fun, and her impulsiveness often leads to misadventures when she ignores her parents' advice. Karen's friends include Janis, Candy, Peter, Spider Gibson, and David Rowe III. Cliff Murdock is the building superintendent and handyman at 90 Bristol Court.

== Cast ==
- Karen Scott — Debbie Watson
- Steve Scott — Richard Denning
- Barbara Scott — Mary LaRoche
- Mimi Scott — Gina Gillespie
- Janis — Bernadette Withers
- Candy — Trudi Ames
- Peter — Teddy Quinn
- Spider Gibson — Murray MacLeod
- David Rowe III — Richard Dreyfuss (recurring)
- Cliff Murdock — Guy Raymond (October 1964–January 1965)

== 90 Bristol Court ==
Karen was one of three 30-minute sitcoms broadcast Monday nights under the umbrella title 90 Bristol Court; the other two were Harris Against the World, which followed Karen, and Tom, Dick and Mary, which completed the 90-minute programming block. Despite all three shows being set at the same Los Angeles apartment complex with the address 90 Bristol Court, the only connection the three series had was the character of handyman Cliff Murdoch (portrayed by Guy Raymond), who greeted the residents and visitors to 90 Bristol Court. After the last episodes of Harris Against the World and Tom, Dick and Mary aired on January 4, 1965, 90 Bristol Court ceased to be a programming entity, and handyman Murdoch disappeared from Karen as well.

== Production ==
The Beach Boys performed Karen′s theme song, also entitled "Karen."

== Broadcast history ==
The show premiered on NBC as 90 Bristol Court: Karen on October 5, 1964, and continued under that title through the broadcast of January 4, 1965. It drew low ratings: For the November-to-December 1964 reporting period, the Nielsen ratings ranked it 87th among the 96 prime-time network television shows. Tom, Dick and Mary fared only slightly better, and Harris Against the World had even lower ratings than Karen. In mid-November 1964 The New York Times reported that NBC planned to cancel both and Harris Against the World and Tom, Dick and Mary, effective in early January 1965. Their last episodes aired on January 4, 1965.

With the demise of Harris Against the World and Tom, Dick and Mary and with them the 90 Bristol Court programming concept, the 90 Bristol Court umbrella title was dropped from Karen and handyman Cliff Murdock disappeared from the show. From January 11, 1965, until the end of its run, the show ran as a stand-alone series, titled simply Karen. Although Karen outlasted the other two 90 Bristol Court shows, NBC announced in February 1965 that it would not renew Karen for the 1965-1966 season. The last of the 28 original episodes of Karen aired on April 19, 1965. NBC then broadcast prime-time reruns of Karen in its regular time slot, the last of them on August 30, 1965. Karen aired at 7:30 p.m. on Monday throughout its run.

Peter Tewksbury wrote, produced, and directed all three episodes that aired as part of 90 Bristol Court on November 23, 1964, and used the philosophy of Henry David Thoreau regarding simple living as a starting point for each of them: On Karen, Thoreau influenced Karen and her complicated love life when she mistakenly made three dates for the same Saturday night; on Harris Against the World, Thoreau inspired Harris to take his family fishing, only to find that he has to renew his driver's license that day; and on Tom, Dick and Mary, Dick used Thoreau's philosophy as he attempted to fix several broken household appliances.

== Episodes ==
No.	Title	Directed by	Written by	Original release date
1	"Karen's Mixup"	David Alexander	Joe Connelly & Bob Mosher	October 5, 1964
Alternative title "Karen." The pilot for the series. In a mixup at the airport, Karen mistakes an Italian sculptor several years her senior for another Italian man who was supposed to be her blind date, and she brings the sculptor home instead. Guest stars: Lee Bergere, Anthony Hall, and Vito Scotti.
2	"Surfer's Aide"	David Alexander	Joe Connelly, Thomas Knickerbocker, Mort Lewis & Bob Mosher	October 12, 1964
Against her father's wishes Karen takes up surfing and starts dating surfer Hoot Dubbins — who is a real swinger — and much trouble ensues. Guest star: Yale Summers.
3	"The Wig"	Hollingsworth Morse	William Raynor & Myles Wilder	October 19, 1964
Karen and two of her girlfriends try to pool their money to buy a wig. Guest stars: Jack Bannon and Eve McVeagh.
4	"Home, James"	Jeffrey Hayden	William Raynor & Myles Wilder	October 26, 1964
Karen already has a car and a driver's license, but she pretends she can't drive when Jim Fraser offers to teach her how to drive. Guest star: Buck Taylor and Larry Thor.
5	"No Boys Allowed"	Bruce Bilson	Ronny Pearlman	November 2, 1964
Karen's parents ban her from dating when her grades begin to slip, so she promises her parents that she and Janis will not let boys distract them from their studies. Guest stars: Allan Hunt, Frank Gardner, and John Hubbard.
6	"Beethoven or Baseball"	David Alexander	Rick Mittleman	November 9, 1964
Karen thinks she's in love with a boy named Jerry Clark. Guest star: Michael Bregan
7	"Father-Daughter Dance"	Sidney Salkow	Story by : John O'Dea & Sidney Salkow, Teleplay by : William Raynor & Myles Wilder	November 16, 1964
Steve has to scrap his Friday night bowling plans because he promised to take Karen to the Father-Daughter Dance. Guest stars: Bert Freed, Herbert Anderson, and Annette Corman.
8	"Karen's Simplicity Complex"	Peter Tewksbury	Peter Tewksbury	November 23, 1964
Henry David Thoreau's philosophy of simple living influences Karen when her complicated romantic life leads her to mistakenly make three dates for the same Saturday night. Guest stars: Leo Slezak and Don Connor.
9	"Bristol Court to Broadway"	Unknown	Unknown	November 30, 1964
Karen competes with Emily Fluger to be the bass drum player in the high school band — but lessens her chances of making the band when she loses the school′s drum while on her way to the band tryout. Guest stars: Beverly Washburn and S. John Launer.
10	"Teacher's Romance"	Norman Abbott	Tom Adair & James Allardice	December 7, 1964
After seeing her history teacher in tears, Karen assumes that the problem is romance, so she decides to play matchmaker. Guest stars: Jeanne Bal, Richard Anderson, and Hap Holmwood.
11	"Hollywood Bound"	George Stevens Jr.	Joe Connelly & Bob Mosher	December 14, 1964
Trouble begins when Karen uses her birthday check to buy an Afghan Hound. Guest stars: Parley Baer, Bobo Lewis, and Peter Adams.
12	"The Infernal Triangle"	David Alexander	Story by : Elon Packard, Teleplay by : Joe Connelly, Bob Mosher & Norman Paul	December 28, 1964
While lunching with her friends at a fancy restaurant, Karen spots her father dining with a lovely divorcée. Her father's lunch is innocent — but Karen suspects something far more sinister. Guest stars: Sandra Warner and Ramsay Hill.
13	"New Year's Eve"	Richard L. Bare	Al Bertino & Richard Kinney	January 4, 1965
The last episode of Karen to air as part of 90 Bristol Court. Karen's New Year's Eve date has to leave town. Guest star: Bobo Lewis.
14	"Good Neighbor Policy"	Hollingsworth Morse	Story by : Phyllis Bounds Deitege, Teleplay by : Al Bertino, Joe Connelly, Richard Kinney & Bob Mosher	January 11, 1965
The first episode of Karen to air as a stand-alone series. The Scotts get new neighbors — and lots of trouble. Guest stars: Joyce Van Patten, Edward Binns, and Heather North.
15	"The Formal"	Eddie Feldman	William Raynor & Myles Wilder	January 18, 1965
Steve begins to regret not buying Karen a new formal. Guest star: Dennis Patrick.
16	"Karen Robs the Cradle"	Hollingsworth Morse	Rick Mittleman, William Raynor & Myles Wilder	January 25, 1965
Karen and her girlfriends compete for the attention of the new boy at school. Guest stars: Clive Clerk, Lurene Tuttle, Mollie Howerton, and Vicki Draves.
17	"Avery's Coming"	George Stevens Jr.	Jimmy Begg & MacDonald MacPherson	February 1, 1965
Karen tries to get out of a date her parents set up. Guest star: Jay Ripley.
18	"Who's Seymour?"	Sidney Miller	Bill Davenport & Charles Tannen	February 8, 1965
An expensive charm bracelet with a loving inscription on it arrives in the mail for Karen. Candy believes that it came from an adult secret admirer, becomes obsessed with who the man is, and decides it is the girls' French teacher, Mr. Dumont. The girls don't know that Karen's parents bought the bracelet to reward Karen for her B+ average at school. Guest stars: Miguel Landa, Jan Avery, Steven Geray, Gil Lamb, Jackie Russell, and Freddy Raye.
19	"Young at Heart"	David Butler	Albert Beich & William H. Wright, Suggested as an idea by: Joe Connelly & Bob Mosher	February 15, 1965
Karen decides to rejuvenate her "aging" mother. Guest star: Harriet MacGibbon.
20	"Holiday in Ski Valley"	Jeffrey Hayden	Dale & Katherine Eunson	February 22, 1965
Karen and her new friend spend a gloomy holiday at a ski resort. Guest stars: Bonnie Franklin and Irene Tedrow.
21	"Civic Duty"	David Friedkin	Jackson Beck & Rick Mittleman	March 1, 1965
Karen's handsome new teacher inspires her romantically. Guest star: Linden Chiles.
22	"Karen the Babysitter"	John Erman	Story by : Jackson Beck & Rick Mittleman, Teleplay by : Joe Connelly, Bob Mosher, William Raynor & Myles Wilder	March 8, 1965
To prove she can handle responsibility, Karen tries baby-sitting. Guest star: Michel Petit.
23	"Sergeant Grandma"	John Rich	R.S. Allen & Harvey Bullock	March 15, 1965
Grandma uses old-fashioned strictness while looking after the girls. Guest stars: Josephine Hutchinson, Betsy Hale, and Allan Hunt.
24	"Substitute Father"	Hollingsworth Morse	John Whedon	March 22, 1965
Steve gets jealous when Karen takes her homework problems elsewhere. Guest stars: Don Hamner, Morgan Brittany (credited as "Suzanne Cupito"), and Charla Doherty
25	"Big Bad Jim"	Bernard Girard	Calvin Clements and Rick Mittleman	March 29, 1965
Karen tries to find out why she's having trouble getting dates. Guest stars: Dave Draper, Ann Doran, and Murray MacLeod.
26	"The Beverly Beat"	Leslie Goodwins & Ida Lupino	Jerry Davis & Lee Loeb and Rick Mittleman	April 5, 1965
As gossip columnist for the school newspaper, Karen puts some spice in the news. Guest stars: Beverly Lunsford, Roger Ewing, and Grace Albertson.
27	"The Understudy"	Unknown	Unknown	April 12, 1965
Karen fails to learn her part for the school play. Guest star: Murray MacLeod
28	"Mimi's First Love"	Norman Abbott	George Tibbles	April 19, 1965
Mimi has a sudden interest in music — and other romantic things.
