= It's a Man's World (TV series) =

- Genre: Comedy drama
- Created by: Peter Tewksbury; James Leighton
- Starring: Glenn Corbett; Michael Burns; Ted Bessell; Randy Boone
- Composers: Earle Hagen; Jack Marshall; Herbert W. Spencer
- Country of origin: United States
- Original language: English
- No. of seasons: 1
- No. of episodes: 19

Production
- Camera setup: Single-camera
- Running time: 60 mins.
- Production companies: Heyday Productions; Revue Studios

Original release
- Network: NBC
- Release: September 17, 1962 – January 28, 1963

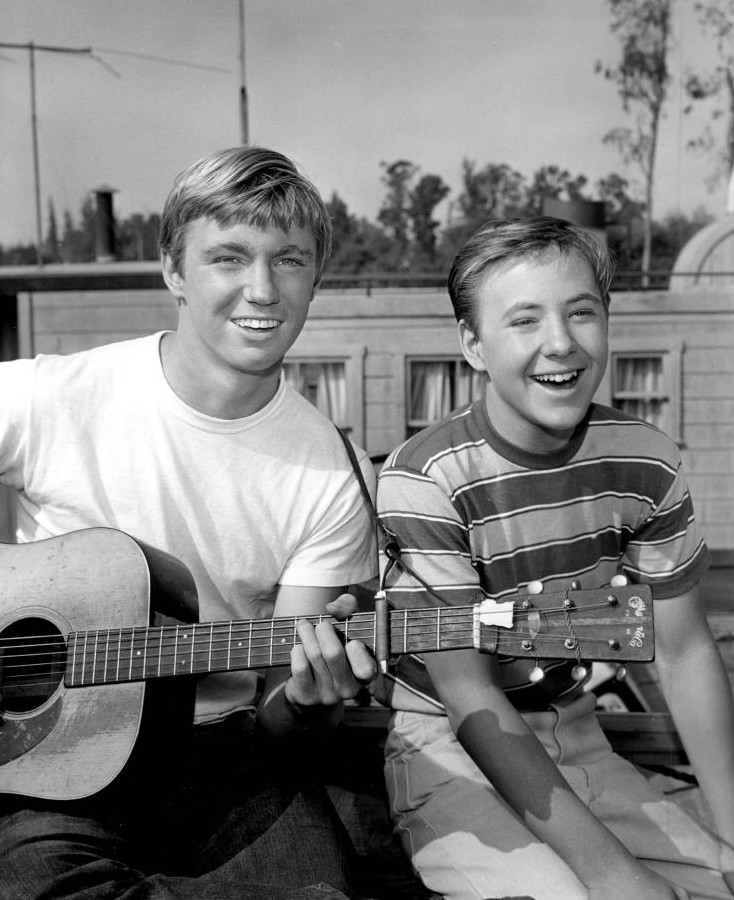
Randy Boone and Michael Burns

It's a Man's World is an American comedy-drama television series starring Glenn Corbett which aired on NBC from September 17, 1962, to January 28, 1963.

== Plot ==
Tom, Vern, and Wes are young men living on a houseboat called Elephant in the Ohio River. Wes is a local, but Tom (nicknamed Tom-Tom) is from Chicago and Vern is from North Carolina. The boat is docked near a service station owned by Mr. Stott, who serves as a grouchy father figure to the men. Wes has a serious girlfriend, Irene, who attends Cordella College along with Wes and Tom. Wes' orphaned little brother Howie also lives with them. The custody agreement states that Howie must be raised in an upstanding environment, which cramps the style of the fun-loving dudes.

== Cast ==
- Glenn Corbett as Wes Macauley
- Michael Burns as Howie Macauley
- Ted Bessell as Tom-Tom DeWitt
- Randy Boone as Vern Hodges
- Harry Harvey as Houghton Stott
- Jan Norris as Irene Hoff
- Kate Murtaugh as Mrs. Iona Dobson
- Scott White as Virgil Dobson
- Jeanine Cashell as Alma Jean Dobson
- Ann Schuyler as Nora

== Episodes ==
No.	Title	Directed by	Written by	Original release date
1	"Four to Go"	Peter Tewksbury	Jim Leighton & James Menzies	September 17, 1962
2	"Stir Crazy"	Peter Tewksbury	Peter Tewksbury & Jim Leighton	September 24, 1962
3	"Molly Pitcher and the Green-Eyed Monster"	Peter Tewksbury	Story by : James Menzies; Teleplay by : David Duncan	October 1, 1962
4	"Winning His Way"	Peter Tewksbury	John McGreevey	October 8, 1962
5	"Drive Over to Exeter"	Peter Tewksbury	Story by : Jim Leighton; Teleplay by : Earl Hamner Jr.	October 22, 1962
6	"The Beavers and the Otters"	Peter Tewksbury	Ben Masselink & Jim Leighton	October 29, 1962
7	"Howie's Adventure"	Peter Tewksbury	Peter Tewksbury & Jim Leighton	November 5, 1962
8	"The Bravest Man in Cordella"	Peter Tewksbury	Elliot L. Sims	November 12, 1962
9	"The Man on the Second Floor"	Peter Tewksbury	Story by : Jim Leighton; Teleplay by : John McGreevey	November 19, 1962
10	"I Count My Life in Coffee Cups"	Peter Tewksbury	William Blinn & Michael Gleason	November 26, 1962
11	"Chicago Gains a Number"	Lamont Johnson	Elliot L. Sims	December 3, 1962
12	"The Macauley Profile"	Peter Tewksbury	Hal J. Todd	December 10, 1962
13	"The Long Short Cut"	Peter Tewksbury	Peter Tewksbury & Jim Leighton	December 17, 1962
14	"The Long Way Around"	Peter Tewksbury	Robert Bassing	December 24, 1962
15	"Night Beat of the Tom-Tom"	Lamont Johnson	David Duncan & Jim Leighton	December 31, 1962
16	"Hour of Truth"	Hal J. Todd	William Blinn & Michael Gleason	January 7, 1963
17	"The Unbalanced Line"	Hal J. Todd	Story by : James Bonnett; Teleplay by : Jim Leighton & James Menzies	January 14, 1963
18	"Mutiny on the Elephant"	Peter Tewksbury	Elliot L. Sims	January 21, 1963
19	"Winter Story"	Hal J. Todd	Jim Leighton & James Menzies	January 28, 1963

== Production ==
Revue Productions packaged the series, which was filmed at Revue Studios in Universal City, California. Peter Tewksbury created the show and was the producer and director. Jack Marshall provided the music. The series was broadcast on Mondays from 7:30 to 8:30 p.m. Eastern Time.

== Critical response ==
A review in The New York Times said that It's a Man's World "is not really that good". The review noted that the houseboat setting was not typical for a group of young men and said that the characters were often boring.

== Aftermath ==
After the show was cancelled as of mid-January 1963, Corbett found work almost immediately on the already-airing show Route 66. Route 66 was thematically similar to It's A Man's World, exploring many of the same issues of American life, particularly the issues of restlessness and idealism. Corbett began his co-starring role as Lincoln Case on Route 66 in March, 1963.

In 1977, ABC revisited the premise of It's a Man's World with The San Pedro Beach Bums, a 60-minute situation comedy about five young men living together on a houseboat in San Pedro, California. It also was unsuccessful, lasting only ten episodes.
