= Peter Tewksbury =

American film director (1923–2003)

- Born: March 21, 1923; Cleveland, Ohio, United States
- Died: February 20, 2003 (aged 79); Brattleboro, Vermont, United States
- Occupation: Director
- Years active: 1954–1977

Henry Peter Tewksbury (March 21, 1923 – February 20, 2003) was best-known as an American film and television director. After leaving the entertainment business, he worked as a farmer rancher, educator, and food writer.

== Biography ==
Born in Cleveland, he attended Dartmouth College but left to serve as a U.S. Army captain in the Pacific during World War II.

Following the war, he worked for radio KTIP in Porterville, California where he did almost every job at the station during a five-year stint. With his first wife Katharine, he founded the Porterville Barn Theater in 1947 and became its director, producing more than 270 plays.

== Television ==
Tewksbury was hired to direct Father Knows Best when it moved from radio to TV in 1954 and won an Emmy Award for directing an episode in 1959. He also produced and directed episodes of the Jackie Cooper series, The People’s Choice.

He directed several television pilots that were turned into made-for-TV movies. Many were directed by My Three Sons writer, A.J. Carothers.

In 1960, Tewksbury directed My Three Sons. He left after the first season and together with a writer of the show's episodes, James Leighton, created, produced and directed It's a Man's World, a TV series aired from September 1962 to January 1963, which attracted a loyal following, but not sponsors. Tewksbury said the show aimed "to destroy -- ridicule, if you will -- all sources of arbitrary authority and custom. The sponsors were the people we were fighting. They were the mature, sensible heavies and we were creating a revolution. We were destroying everything they believed in.''

== Motion pictures ==
Tewksbury directed Sunday in New York with Jane Fonda in 1963, Walt Disney's Emil and the Detectives in 1964, and a pair of Elvis Presley movies ("Stay Away Joe" and "Trouble with Girls".

He collaborated with J.D. Salinger on a film adaptation of the author's "For Esmé—with Love and Squalor", which was never produced after a casting dispute between the two men.

== Henry the Cheeseman ==
Tewksbury grew frustrated with the entertainment business and began to explore new paths in the 1970s. Declaring "Peter Tewksbury the director is dead", he took the name Henry.

Tewksbury and his family moved between Vermont and California, where he managed a ranch near Cambria, California. In Vermont, he worked as a farmer, a miller, and founded an alternative school in an abandoned one-room schoolhouse. Later, he became a cheese expert known as "Henry the Cheeseman. He wrote The Cheeses of Vermont: A Gourmet Guide to Vermont's Artisanal Cheesemakers. Tewksbury was a legendary figure at the Brattleboro Food Co-op.

== Film Credits ==
- Sunday in New York (1963)
- Emil and the Detectives (1964)
- Doctor, You've Got to Be Kidding! (1967)
- Stay Away, Joe (1968)
- The Trouble with Girls (And How To Get Into It) (1969)
