= 1967–68 United States network television schedule =

The following is the 1967–68 network television schedule for the three major English language commercial broadcast networks in the United States. The schedule covers primetime hours from September 1967 through August 1968. The schedule is followed by a list per network of returning series, new series, and series cancelled after the 1966–67 season.

New fall series are highlighted in bold.

Each of the 30 highest-rated shows is listed with its rank and rating as determined by Nielsen Media Research.

National Educational Television (NET), the network predecessor to PBS, introduced its first live, in-pattern weekly series in November 1967, PBL (an acronym for Public Broadcast Laboratory), which was cleared in a simultaneous 8:30pm ET/5:30pm PT Sunday time-slot on the majority of NET stations. In the first season the series offered usually two-hour episodes, in the second season (1968–69) episodes usually ran for 90 minutes, after a 150-minute premiere on November 5, 1967. The series was a mix of filmed segments and live interviews, discussion panels and other performance.

Yellow indicates the programs in the top 10 for the season.
Cyan indicates the programs in the top 20 for the season.
Magenta indicates the programs in the top 30 for the season.

== Sunday ==
Network		7:00 PM	7:30 PM	8:00 PM	8:30 PM	9:00 PM	9:30 PM	10:00 PM	10:30 PM
ABC		Voyage to the Bottom of the Sea		The F.B.I. (22/21.2)		The ABC Sunday Night Movie			
CBS	Fall	Lassie (30/19.9) (Tied with It Takes a Thief)	**Gentle Ben** (19/21.5)	The Ed Sullivan Show (13/23.2)		The Smothers Brothers Comedy Hour (18/21.7)		Mission: Impossible	
CBS	Summer	Lassie (30/19.9) (Tied with It Takes a Thief)	**Gentle Ben** (19/21.5)	The Ed Sullivan Show (13/23.2)		The Summer Brothers Smothers Show		Mission: Impossible	
NBC	Fall	**AFL Football** (from 4:30 EST)	Walt Disney's Wonderful World of Color (25/20.7)		**The Mothers-in-Law**	Bonanza (4/25.5) (Tied with Gunsmoke and Family Affair)		**The High Chaparral**	
NBC	Winter	Wild Kingdom	Walt Disney's Wonderful World of Color (25/20.7)		**The Mothers-in-Law**	Bonanza (4/25.5) (Tied with Gunsmoke and Family Affair)		**The High Chaparral**	
NBC	Summer	Flipper (reruns)	Walt Disney's Wonderful World of Color (25/20.7)		**The Mothers-in-Law**	Bonanza (4/25.5) (Tied with Gunsmoke and Family Affair)		**The High Chaparral**	

NOTE: On NBC, Animal Kingdom — renamed Animal World beginning with its August 11, 1968, broadcast — aired from 6:30 to 7:00 p.m. from June 16, 1968, to September 1968.

== Monday ==
Network		7:30 PM	8:00 PM	8:30 PM	9:00 PM	9:30 PM	10:00 PM	10:30 PM
ABC		**Cowboy in Africa**		The Rat Patrol	Felony Squad	Peyton Place	The Big Valley	
CBS	Fall	Gunsmoke (4/25.5) (Tied with Family Affair and Bonanza)		The Lucy Show (2/27.0)	The Andy Griffith Show (1/27.6)	Family Affair (4/25.5) (Tied with Gunsmoke and Bonanza)	**The Carol Burnett Show** (27/20.1) (Tied with Dragnet)	
CBS	July	Gunsmoke (4/25.5) (Tied with Family Affair and Bonanza)		The Lucy Show (2/27.0)	The Andy Griffith Show (1/27.6)	Family Affair (4/25.5) (Tied with Gunsmoke and Bonanza)	**Premiere**	
NBC	Fall	The Monkees	The Man from U.N.C.L.E.		**The Danny Thomas Hour**		I Spy	
NBC	Winter	The Monkees	**Rowan & Martin's Laugh-In** (21/21.3)		**The Danny Thomas Hour**		I Spy	
NBC	Summer	The Monkees	**The Champions**		**The Danny Thomas Hour**		I Spy	

NOTE: On CBS, Premiere was a summer anthology series composed of unsold television pilots.

== Tuesday ==
Network		7:30 PM	8:00 PM	8:30 PM	9:00 PM	9:30 PM	10:00 PM	10:30 PM
ABC	Fall	**Garrison's Gorillas**		The Invaders		**N.Y.P.D.**	The Hollywood Palace	
ABC	Winter	**Garrison's Gorillas**		**It Takes A Thief** (30/19.9) (Tied with Lassie)		**N.Y.P.D.**	The Invaders	
CBS		Daktari		The Red Skelton Show (7/25.3)		**Good Morning World**	CBS News Hour/CBS Reports	
NBC		I Dream of Jeannie	**The Jerry Lewis Show**		NBC Tuesday Night at the Movies (18/21.4)			

== Wednesday ==
Network		7:30 PM	8:00 PM	8:30 PM	9:00 PM	9:30 PM	10:00 PM	10:30 PM
ABC	Fall	**Custer**		**The Second Hundred Years**	The ABC Wednesday Night Movie			
ABC	January	The Avengers		**The Second Hundred Years**	The ABC Wednesday Night Movie			
ABC	Spring	The Avengers		**Dream House**	The ABC Wednesday Night Movie			
CBS	Fall	Lost in Space		The Beverly Hillbillies (12/23.3)	Green Acres (15/22.8) (Tied with The CBS Friday Night Movie)	**He & She**	**Dundee and the Culhane**	
CBS	December	Lost in Space		The Beverly Hillbillies (12/23.3)	Green Acres (15/22.8) (Tied with The CBS Friday Night Movie)	**He & She**	**The Jonathan Winters Show**	
NBC		The Virginian (14/22.9)			**Kraft Music Hall**		Run for Your Life	

Note: CBS decided in September to replace Dundee and the Culhane in December with The Jonathan Winters Show. The Avengers replaced Custer in January 1968.

== Thursday ==
Network		7:30 PM	8:00 PM	8:30 PM	9:00 PM	9:30 PM	10:00 PM	10:30 PM
ABC	Fall	Batman	**The Flying Nun**	Bewitched (11/23.5)	That Girl	Peyton Place	**Good Company**	Local
ABC	Winter	Batman	**The Flying Nun**	Bewitched (11/23.5)	That Girl	Peyton Place	Local	
CBS		**Cimarron Strip**			CBS Thursday Night Movie (23/21.1)			
NBC	Fall	Daniel Boone (29/20.0)		**Ironside** (26/20.5)		Dragnet 1968 (27/20.1) (Tied with The Carol Burnett Show)	The Dean Martin Show (8/24.8)	
NBC	June	Daniel Boone (29/20.0)		**Ironside** (26/20.5)		Dragnet 1968 (27/20.1) (Tied with The Carol Burnett Show)	**Dean Martin Presents the Golddiggers**	

Note: Good Company, an interview show hosted by F. Lee Bailey, did so poorly in the Nielsen ratings that ABC decided not to bother replacing it, temporarily returning its time period to their affiliates.

== Friday ==
Network		7:30 PM	8:00 PM	8:30 PM	9:00 PM	9:30 PM	10:00 PM	10:30 PM
ABC	Fall	**Off to See the Wizard**		**Hondo**		**The Guns of Will Sonnett**	**Judd, for the Defense**	
ABC	Winter	**Off to See the Wizard**		**Operation: Entertainment**		**The Guns of Will Sonnett**	**Judd, for the Defense**	
ABC	Summer	**Off to See the Wizard**		**Man in a Suitcase**		**The Guns of Will Sonnett**	**Judd, for the Defense**	
CBS		The Wild Wild West		Gomer Pyle, U.S.M.C. (3/25.6)	The CBS Friday Night Movie (15/22.8) (Tied with Green Acres)			
NBC	Fall	Tarzan		Star Trek		**Accidental Family**	The Bell Telephone Hour / Actuality Specials / NBC News Reports / American Profile	
NBC	Winter	Tarzan		Star Trek		**Hollywood Squares**	The Bell Telephone Hour / Actuality Specials / NBC News Reports / American Profile	

== Saturday ==
Network		7:30 PM	8:00 PM	8:30 PM	9:00 PM	9:30 PM	10:00 PM	10:30 PM
ABC	Fall	The Dating Game	The Newlywed Game	The Lawrence Welk Show (17/21.9)		Iron Horse		ABC Scope
ABC	Winter	The Dating Game	The Newlywed Game	The Lawrence Welk Show (17/21.9)		The Hollywood Palace		ABC Scope
CBS	Fall	The Jackie Gleason Show (9/23.9)		My Three Sons (24/20.8)	Hogan's Heroes	Petticoat Junction	**Mannix**	
CBS	Summer	**The Prisoner**		My Three Sons (24/20.8)	Hogan's Heroes	Petticoat Junction	**Mannix**	
NBC	Fall	**Maya**		Get Smart	NBC Saturday Night at the Movies (10/23.6)			
NBC	Winter	The Saint		Get Smart	NBC Saturday Night at the Movies (10/23.6)			

== By network ==
=== ABC ===
**Returning Series**

- ABC Scope
- The ABC Sunday Night Movie
- The ABC Wednesday Night Movie
- The Avengers
- Batman
- Bewitched
- The Big Valley
- The Dating Game
- The F.B.I.
- Felony Squad
- The Hollywood Palace
- The Invaders
- Iron Horse
- The King Family Show
- The Lawrence Welk Show
- The Newlywed Game
- Peyton Place
- The Rat Patrol
- Saga of Western Man
- That Girl
- Voyage to the Bottom of the Sea

**New Series**

- **Cowboy in Africa**
- **Custer**
- **Dream House** *
- **The Flying Nun**
- **Garrison's Gorillas**
- **Good Company**
- **The Guns of Will Sonnett**
- **Hondo**
- **It Takes a Thief** *
- **Judd, for the Defense**
- **Man in a Suitcase**
- **N.Y.P.D.**
- **Off to See the Wizard**
- **Operation: Entertainment** *
- **The Second Hundred Years**

Not returning from 1966–67:

- 12 O'Clock High
- ABC Stage 67
- Combat!
- F Troop
- The Fugitive
- The Green Hornet
- Hawk
- Love on a Rooftop
- Malibu U
- The Man Who Never Was
- The Monroes
- The Picadilly Palace
- The Pruitts of Southampton
- Rango
- The Rounders
- Shane
- The Tammy Grimes Show
- The Time Tunnel

=== CBS ===
**Returning Series**

- The 21st Century
- The Andy Griffith Show
- The Beverly Hillbillies
- CBS News Hour
- CBS Playhouse
- CBS Reports
- CBS Thursday Night Movie
- The CBS Friday Night Movies
- Daktari
- The Ed Sullivan Show
- Family Affair
- Gomer Pyle, U.S.M.C.
- Green Acres
- Gunsmoke
- Hogan's Heroes
- The Jackie Gleason Show
- Lassie
- Lost in Space
- The Lucy Show
- Mission: Impossible
- My Three Sons
- Petticoat Junction
- The Red Skelton Show
- The Smothers Brothers Comedy Hour
- The Smothers Brothers Summer Show
- The Wild Wild West

**New Series**

- **The Carol Burnett Show**
- **Cimarron Strip**
- **Dundee and the Culhane**
- **Gentle Ben**
- **Good Morning World**
- **He & She**
- **The Jonathan Winters Show** *
- **Mannix**
- **Premiere** *
- **The Prisoner**

Not returning from 1966–67:

- Away We Go
- Candid Camera
- Coliseum
- Coronet Blue
- The Danny Kaye Show
- The Garry Moore Show
- Gilligan's Island
- I've Got a Secret (returned in 1972 in syndication)
- It's About Time
- The Jean Arthur Show
- Jericho
- Mr. Terrific
- Our Place
- Pistols 'n' Petticoats
- Run, Buddy, Run
- The Steve Allen Comedy Hour
- To Tell the Truth
- Vacation Playhouse
- What's My Line? (returned in 1968 in syndication)

=== NBC ===
**Returning Series**

- Actuality Specials
- American Profile
- The Andy Williams Show
- Animal World
- The Bell Telephone Hour
- Bonanza
- Daniel Boone
- The Dean Martin Show
- Dragnet 1968
- Get Smart
- I Dream of Jeannie
- I Spy
- The Man from U.N.C.L.E.
- The Monkees
- NBC News Reports
- NBC Tuesday Night at the Movies
- NBC Saturday Night at the Movies
- Run for Your Life
- The Saint
- Star Trek
- Tarzan
- The Virginian
- Wild Kingdom
- Walt Disney's Wonderful World of Color

**New Series**

- **Accidental Family**
- **Adam-12**
- **AFL Football**
- **The Champions**
- **Dean Martin Presents the Golddiggers**
- **The High Chaparral**
- **Hollywood Squares** *
- **Ironside**
- **The Jerry Lewis Show**
- **Kraft Music Hall**
- **Maya**
- **The Mothers-in-Law**
- **Rowan and Martin's Laugh-In** *
- **The Sammy Davis Jr. Show** *

Not returning from 1966–67:

- Animal Secrets
- Bob Hope Presents the Chrysler Theatre
- Captain Nice
- Dean Martin Summer Show Starring Your Host Vic Damone
- The Girl from U.N.C.L.E.
- The Hero
- Hey, Landlord
- Laredo
- Occasional Wife
- Please Don't Eat the Daisies
- The Road West
- The Roger Miller Show
- T.H.E. Cat

Note: The * indicates that the program was introduced in midseason.
