= 1966–67 United States network television schedule =

The following is the 1966–67 network television schedule for the three major English language commercial broadcast networks in the United States. The schedule covers primetime hours from September 1966 through August 1967. The schedule is followed by a list per network of returning series, new series, and series cancelled after the 1965–66 season.

New fall series are highlighted in bold.

Each of the 30 highest-rated shows is listed with its rank and rating as determined by Nielsen Media Research.

Yellow indicates the programs in the top 10 for the season.
Cyan indicates the programs in the top 20 for the season.
Magenta indicates the programs in the top 30 for the season.

Note: This is the first full season in which practically all prime time programs were broadcast in color.

NET or National Educational Television, was in operation, but the schedule was set by each affiliated station.

== Sunday ==
Network		7:00 PM	7:30 PM	8:00 PM	8:30 PM	9:00 PM	9:30 PM	10:00 PM	10:30 PM
ABC		Voyage to the Bottom of the Sea		The F.B.I. (29/20.2) (Tied with I Spy, The CBS Thursday Night Movie and My Three Sons)		The ABC Sunday Night Movie (28/20.4)			
CBS	Fall	Lassie	**It's About Time**	The Ed Sullivan Show (10/22.8) (Tied with Gomer Pyle, U.S.M.C., The Virginian and The Lawrence Welk Show)		The Garry Moore Show		Candid Camera	What's My Line?
CBS	Winter	Lassie	**It's About Time**	The Ed Sullivan Show (10/22.8) (Tied with Gomer Pyle, U.S.M.C., The Virginian and The Lawrence Welk Show)		**The Smothers Brothers Comedy Hour** (16/22.2)		Candid Camera	What's My Line?
CBS	Summer	Lassie	**It's About Time**	The Ed Sullivan Show (10/22.8) (Tied with Gomer Pyle, U.S.M.C., The Virginian and The Lawrence Welk Show)		**Our Place**		Candid Camera	What's My Line?
NBC	Fall	The Bell Telephone Hour (6:30) / Actuality Specials	Walt Disney's Wonderful World of Color (19/21.5)		**Hey, Landlord**	Bonanza (1/29.1)		The Andy Williams Show	
NBC	Summer	Animal Secrets	Walt Disney's Wonderful World of Color (19/21.5)		Let's Make A Deal	Bonanza (1/29.1)		**The Saint**	

Note: On NBC, Animal Secrets consisted of reruns of the series, which originally aired on Saturday afternoons from October 1966 to April 1967.

== Monday ==
Network		7:30 PM	8:00 PM	8:30 PM	9:00 PM	9:30 PM	10:00 PM	10:30 PM
ABC		**Iron Horse**		**The Rat Patrol** (23/20.9) (Tied with Petticoat Junction)	**Felony Squad**	Peyton Place	The Big Valley	
CBS	Fall	Gilligan's Island	**Run, Buddy, Run**	The Lucy Show (4/26.2)	The Andy Griffith Show (3/27.4)	**Family Affair** (14/22.6) (Tied with The Dean Martin Show)	**The Jean Arthur Show**	I've Got a Secret
CBS	December	Gilligan's Island	**Run, Buddy, Run**	The Lucy Show (4/26.2)	The Andy Griffith Show (3/27.4)	**Family Affair** (14/22.6) (Tied with The Dean Martin Show)	To Tell the Truth	I've Got a Secret
CBS	Winter	Gilligan's Island	**Mr. Terrific**	The Lucy Show (4/26.2)	The Andy Griffith Show (3/27.4)	**Family Affair** (14/22.6) (Tied with The Dean Martin Show)	To Tell the Truth	I've Got a Secret
CBS	Summer	Gilligan's Island	**Mr. Terrific**	Vacation Playhouse	The Andy Griffith Show (3/27.4)	**Family Affair** (14/22.6) (Tied with The Dean Martin Show)	**Coronet Blue**	
NBC	Fall	**The Monkees**	I Dream of Jeannie	**The Roger Miller Show**	**The Road West** / Kraft Music Hall (once a month)		Run for Your Life	
NBC	Winter	**The Monkees**	I Dream of Jeannie	**Captain Nice**	**The Road West** / Kraft Music Hall (once a month)		Run for Your Life	

Notes: To Tell the Truth replaced The Jean Arthur Show on December 12. Captain Nice replaced The Roger Miller Show on NBC on January 9, the same night the similar Mister Terrific replaced Run, Buddy, Run on CBS. Both series were cancelled by their respective networks at the end of the season. Vacation Playhouse was a CBS summer anthology series made up entirely of unsold television pilots.

== Tuesday ==
Network		7:30 PM	8:00 PM	8:30 PM	9:00 PM	9:30 PM	10:00 PM	10:30 PM
ABC	Fall	Combat!		**The Rounders**	**The Pruitts of Southampton/** **The Phyllis Diller Show**	**Love on a Rooftop**	The Fugitive	
ABC	Winter	Combat!		**The Invaders**		Peyton Place	The Fugitive	
CBS		Daktari (7/23.4) (Tied with Bewitched and The Beverly Hillbillies)		The Red Skelton Hour (2/28.2)		Petticoat Junction (23/20.9) (Tied with The Rat Patrol)	CBS News Hour/CBS Reports	
NBC		**The Girl from U.N.C.L.E.**		**Occasional Wife**	NBC Tuesday Night at the Movies			

Note: The Pruitts of Southampton was renamed The Phyllis Diller Show starting on January 13, 1967.

== Wednesday ==
Network		7:30 PM	8:00 PM	8:30 PM	9:00 PM	9:30 PM	10:00 PM	10:30 PM
ABC	Fall	Batman	**The Monroes**		**The Man Who Never Was**	Peyton Place	**ABC Stage 67**	
ABC	Winter	Batman	**The Monroes**		**The ABC Wednesday Night Movie**			
CBS	Fall	Lost in Space		The Beverly Hillbillies (7/23.4) (Tied with Daktari and Bewitched)	Green Acres (6/24.6)	Gomer Pyle, U.S.M.C. (10/22.8) (Tied with The Virginian, The Lawrence Welk Show and The Ed Sullivan Show)	The Danny Kaye Show	
CBS	Summer	Lost in Space		The Beverly Hillbillies (7/23.4) (Tied with Daktari and Bewitched)	Green Acres (6/24.6)	Gomer Pyle, U.S.M.C. (10/22.8) (Tied with The Virginian, The Lawrence Welk Show and The Ed Sullivan Show)	**The Steve Allen Comedy Hour**	
NBC		The Virginian (10/22.8) (Tied with Gomer Pyle, U.S.M.C., The Lawrence Welk Show and The Ed Sullivan Show)			Bob Hope Presents the Chrysler Theatre (26/20.7)		I Spy (29/20.2) (Tied with The CBS Thursday Night Movie, My Three Sons and The F.B.I.)	

== Thursday ==
Network		7:30 PM	8:00 PM	8:30 PM	9:00 PM	9:30 PM	10:00 PM	10:30 PM
ABC	Fall	Batman	F Troop	**The Tammy Grimes Show**	Bewitched (7/23.4) (Tied with Daktari and The Beverly Hillbillies)	**That Girl**	**Hawk**	
ABC	October	Batman	F Troop	The Dating Game	Bewitched (7/23.4) (Tied with Daktari and The Beverly Hillbillies)	**That Girl**	**Hawk**	
ABC	Winter	Batman	F Troop	Bewitched (7/23.4) (Tied with Daktari and The Beverly Hillbillies)	**Love on a Rooftop**	**That Girl**	**ABC Stage 67**	
ABC	Spring	Batman	F Troop	Bewitched (7/23.4) (Tied with Daktari and The Beverly Hillbillies)	**That Girl**	**Love on a Rooftop**	**ABC Stage 67**	
CBS	Fall	**Jericho**		My Three Sons (29/20.2) (Tied with I Spy, The CBS Thursday Night Movie and The F.B.I.)	CBS Thursday Night Movie (29/20.2) (Tied with I Spy, My Three Sons and The F.B.I.)			
CBS	Winter	**Coliseum**		My Three Sons (29/20.2) (Tied with I Spy, The CBS Thursday Night Movie and The F.B.I.)	CBS Thursday Night Movie (29/20.2) (Tied with I Spy, My Three Sons and The F.B.I.)			
CBS	Summer	The Lucy-Desi Comedy Hour (R) (B/W)		My Three Sons (29/20.2) (Tied with I Spy, The CBS Thursday Night Movie and The F.B.I.)	CBS Thursday Night Movie (29/20.2) (Tied with I Spy, My Three Sons and The F.B.I.)			
NBC	Fall	Daniel Boone (25/20.8)		**Star Trek**		**The Hero**	The Dean Martin Show (14/22.6) (Tied with Family Affair)	
NBC	Winter	Daniel Boone (25/20.8)		**Star Trek**		**Dragnet 1967** (21/21.2)	The Dean Martin Show (14/22.6) (Tied with Family Affair)	
NBC	Summer	Daniel Boone (25/20.8)		**Star Trek**		**Dragnet 1967** (21/21.2)	**The Dean Martin Summer Show Starring Your Host Vic Damone**	

Note: The Tammy Grimes Show lasted only four weeks and was replaced by The Dating Game on October 6.

== Friday ==
Network		7:30 PM	8:00 PM	8:30 PM	9:00 PM	9:30 PM	10:00 PM	10:30 PM
ABC	Fall	**The Green Hornet**	**The Time Tunnel**		The Milton Berle Show		12 O'Clock High	
ABC	Winter	**The Green Hornet**	**The Time Tunnel**		**Rango**	**The Phyllis Diller Show** *	The Avengers	
CBS		The Wild Wild West		Hogan's Heroes (17/21.8) (Tied with The CBS Friday Night Movie)	**The CBS Friday Night Movie** (17/21.8) (Tied with Hogan's Heroes)			
NBC		**Tarzan** (27/20.5)		The Man from U.N.C.L.E.		**T.H.E. Cat**	Laredo	

(*) Formerly known as The Pruitts of Southampton

== Saturday ==
Network		7:30 PM	8:00 PM	8:30 PM	9:00 PM	9:30 PM	10:00 PM	10:30 PM
ABC	Fall	**Shane**		The Lawrence Welk Show (10/22.8) (Tied with Gomer Pyle, U.S.M.C., The Virginian and The Ed Sullivan Show)		The Hollywood Palace		ABC Scope
ABC	January	The Dating Game	**The Newlywed Game**	The Lawrence Welk Show (10/22.8) (Tied with Gomer Pyle, U.S.M.C., The Virginian and The Ed Sullivan Show)		The Hollywood Palace		ABC Scope
ABC	May	The Dating Game	**The Newlywed Game**	The Lawrence Welk Show (10/22.8) (Tied with Gomer Pyle, U.S.M.C., The Virginian and The Ed Sullivan Show)		**The Piccadilly Palace**		ABC Scope
CBS	Fall	The Jackie Gleason Show (5/25.3)		**Pistols 'n' Petticoats**	**Mission: Impossible**		Gunsmoke	
CBS	Winter	The Jackie Gleason Show (5/25.3)		**Mission: Impossible**		**Pistols 'n' Petticoats**	Gunsmoke	
CBS	Summer	**Away We Go**		**Mission: Impossible**		**Pistols 'n' Petticoats**	Gunsmoke	
NBC		Flipper	Please Don't Eat the Daisies	Get Smart (22/21.0)	NBC Saturday Night at the Movies (20/21.4)			

== By network ==
=== ABC ===
**Returning Series**

- 12 O'Clock High
- ABC Scope
- The ABC Sunday Night Movie
- The Avengers
- Batman
- Bewitched
- The Big Valley
- Combat!
- Dark Shadows
- The Dating Game
- F Troop
- The F.B.I.
- The Fugitive
- The Hollywood Palace
- The King Family Show
- The Lawrence Welk Show
- Peyton Place
- Saga of Western Man
- Texaco Star Theatre (moved from NBC)
- Voyage to the Bottom of the Sea

**New Series**

- **ABC Stage 67**
- **The ABC Wednesday Night Movie**
- **Felony Squad**
- **The Green Hornet**
- **Hawk**
- **The Invaders** *
- **Iron Horse**
- **Love on a Rooftop**
- **Malibu U** *
- **The Man Who Never Was**
- **The Monroes**
- **The Newlywed Game**
- **The Picadilly Palace** *
- **The Pruitts of Southampton**
- **Rango** *
- **The Rat Patrol**
- **The Rounders**
- **Shane**
- **The Tammy Grimes Show**
- **That Girl**
- **The Time Tunnel**

Not returning from 1965–66:

- The Addams Family
- The Adventures of Ozzie and Harriet
- Amos Burke — Secret Agent
- The Baron
- Ben Casey
- Blue Light
- Court Martial
- The Donna Reed Show
- The Double Life of Henry Phyfe
- The Farmer's Daughter
- The Flintstones
- Gidget
- Honey West
- The Jimmy Dean Show
- The Legend of Jesse James
- The Long Hot Summer
- A Man Called Shenandoah
- McHale's Navy
- O.K. Crackerby!
- The Patty Duke Show
- Preview Tonight
- Shindig!
- Summer Fun
- Tammy

=== CBS ===
**Returning Series**

- The 21st Century
- The Andy Griffith Show
- The Beverly Hillbillies
- Candid Camera
- CBS News Hour
- CBS Reports
- CBS Thursday Night Movie
- Daktari
- The Danny Kaye Show
- The Ed Sullivan Show
- The Garry Moore Show
- Gilligan's Island
- Gomer Pyle, U.S.M.C.
- Green Acres
- Gunsmoke
- Hogan's Heroes
- I've Got a Secret
- The Jackie Gleason Show
- Lassie
- Lost in Space
- The Lucy Show
- My Three Sons
- Petticoat Junction
- The Red Skelton Hour
- To Tell the Truth
- Vacation Playhouse
- The Wild Wild West
- What's My Line?

**New Series**

- **Away We Go** *
- **The CBS Friday Night Movie**
- **CBS Playhouse** *
- **Coliseum** *
- **Coronet Blue** *
- **Family Affair**
- **It's About Time**
- **The Jean Arthur Show**
- **Jericho**
- **Mission: Impossible**
- **Mr. Terrific** *
- **Our Place** *
- **Pistols 'n' Petticoats**
- **Run, Buddy, Run** *
- **The Smothers Brothers Comedy Hour** *
- **The Steve Allen Comedy Hour** *

Not returning from 1965–66:

- Art Linkletter's Hollywood Talent Scouts
- Continental Showcase
- The Dick Van Dyke Show
- The Face Is Familiar
- Hazel
- The Hippodrome
- The John Gary Show
- The Loner
- The Munsters
- My Favorite Martian
- Perry Mason
- Rawhide
- Secret Agent
- Slattery's People
- The Smothers Brothers Show
- The Smothers Brothers Summer Show
- The Steve Lawrence Show
- The Trials of O'Brien
- Wayne & Shuster Take An Affectionate Look At...

=== NBC ===
**Returning Series**

- Actuality Specials
- The Andy Williams Show
- Animal Secrets
- The Bell Telephone Hour
- Bob Hope Presents the Chrysler Theatre
- Bonanza
- Daniel Boone
- The Dean Martin Show
- Flipper
- Get Smart
- I Dream of Jeannie
- I Spy
- Kraft Music Hall
- Laredo
- Let's Make a Deal
- The Man from U.N.C.L.E.
- NBC Tuesday Night at the Movies
- NBC Saturday Night at the Movies
- Please Don't Eat the Daisies
- Run for Your Life
- The Virginian
- Walt Disney's Wonderful World of Color

**New Series**

- **Captain Nice** *
- **Dean Martin Summer Show Starring Your Host Vic Damone** *
- **Dragnet 1967** *
- **The Girl from U.N.C.L.E.**
- **The Hero**
- **Hey, Landlord**
- **The Monkees**
- **Occasional Wife**
- **The Road West** *
- **The Roger Miller Show**
- **The Saint** *
- **Star Trek**
- **Tarzan**
- **T.H.E. Cat**

Not returning from 1965–66:

- Branded
- Camp Runamuck
- Chrysler Presents a Bob Hope Special
- Convoy
- Dr. Kildare
- Hank
- Hullabaloo
- The John Forsythe Show
- Mickie Finn's
- Mister Roberts
- Mona McCluskey
- My Mother the Car
- The Wackiest Ship in the Army

Note: The * indicates that the program was introduced in midseason.
