= 1966 in television =

The year 1966 in television involved some significant events. Below is a list of television-related events in 1966.

== Events ==
- January 3 – Hullabaloo on NBC in the United States shows promotional videos of The Beatles songs "Day Tripper" and "We Can Work It Out".
- January 8 – Shindig! airs for the last time on ABC in the United States, with musical guests the Kinks and the Who.
- January 11 – Dorothy Malone resumes the role of Constance Carson on Peyton Place (she had been temporarily replaced by Lola Albright).
- January 12 – The first episode of the live-action Batman television series ("Hi Diddle Riddle") is aired on ABC in the United States starring Adam West and Burt Ward
- January 13 – Tabitha is born on the Bewitched episode titled "And Then There Were Three."
- February 1 – KFBB-TV in Great Falls, Montana becomes the first station in that state to affiliate primarily with ABC.
- February 5 – ABC Scope begins to devote itself exclusively to coverage of the Vietnam war.
- February 15 – Citing circumstances beyond his control, Fred Friendly resigns from CBS News in the United States.
- February 18 – An Evening with Carol Channing airs on CBS in the United States.
- February 23 – Television comes to Greece with the launch of ERT.
- February 27 – Perry Mason airs its only color episode, "The Case of the Twice-Told Twist."
- February – THVN (Vietnamese National Television Network) first launched.
- March 30 – The special Color Me Barbra, with Barbra Streisand, airs on CBS in the United States.
- April 13 – Samuel Beckett's television play Eh Joe is first presented (in German translation as He Joe) by Süddeutscher Rundfunk, Stuttgart; it is followed by English-language productions on WNDT in the United States on April 18 and on BBC2 in the United Kingdom on July 4.
- April 18 – The Academy Awards air in color for the first time, on ABC.
- May 15 – The first Japanese Owarai variety show program, Shoten, debuts on Nippon Television Network, and will be watched by more than 25 million Japanese every week.
- June 5 – The Beatles make a taped appearance on The Ed Sullivan Show in the United States, debuting their music videos for "Rain" and "Paperback Writer."
- June – ABS-CBN introduces color television to the Philippines, using NTSC.
- July 1 – As part of the start of Canada's centennial celebrations, color television broadcasts using NTSC are launched on state owned CBC and SRC, as well as on CTV.
- July 10 – Ultraman debuts on TBS in Japan. The character would spawn over 16 television adaptions over the next 40 years.
- July 16 – The Miss Universe pageant goes color.
- July 30 – An all-time record United Kingdom television audience of more than 32,000,000 watches the England national football team beat West Germany 4–2 to win the FIFA World Cup at Wembley.
- August 6 – In a post-fight interview, Howard Cosell honors Muhammad Ali's wishes to no longer be referred to as Cassius Clay, contrasting with the approach of most other sports reporters of the time.
- September – ABC, CBS, and NBC complete the color transition from the previous season for their prime-time programming by the start of the fall season, with all network programs being telecast in color.
- September 8 – The first episode of Star Trek ("The Man Trap") is aired.
- September 9 – The first episode of The Green Hornet ("The Silent Gun") is aired on ABC in the United States starring Van Williams and Bruce Lee.
- September 10 – A night of firsts for the Miss America Pageant—its first color TV broadcast and its first airing on NBC.
- September 19 – Color television comes to Alaska as KENI-TV airs the premiere episode of That Girl ("Don't Just Do Something, Stand There", which had aired in the "lower 48" on September 8).
- October 2 – The four-part serial Talking to a Stranger, acclaimed as one of the finest British television dramas of the 1960s, begins transmission in the Theatre 625 strand on BBC2.
- October 6 – After quickly cancelling The Tammy Grimes Show, ABC fills the void by launching a prime-time edition of The Dating Game. The show's success leads to The Newlywed Game's own prime-time edition in January 1967.
- October 15 – A TV version of the musical Brigadoon is telecast on ABC in the United States as a special, using an updated script and story line and re-introducing some of the songs cut from the 1954 movie. The production stars Robert Goulet, Peter Falk and Sally Ann Howes, also featuring Edward Villella and Marlyn Mason. The special airs only one other time, in 1967, before disappearing completely.
- October 17 – All of NBC's news programming begins airing in full-color.
- October 27 – It's the Great Pumpkin, Charlie Brown airs for the first time on CBS.
- November 7 – Concentration switches to color, establishing NBC as the first full color network with 100% color broadcasts.
- November 16 – BBC television drama Cathy Come Home, filmed in a docudrama style, is broadcast in BBC1's The Wednesday Play anthology strand in the UK. Viewed by a quarter of the British population, it is considered influential on public attitudes to homelessness and the related social issues it deals with. It was written by Jeremy Sandford, produced by Tony Garnett and directed by Ken Loach, with Carol White in the title role.
- November 19 – First live 2-way satellite telecasts between Hawaii (KHVH-TV, now KITV) and the Mainland (ABC), via the Lani Bird satellite.
- December 18 – CBS in the United States airs How the Grinch Stole Christmas! animated TV special for the first time.
- December 21 – A Christmas Memory, a recounting of Truman Capote's childhood experiences as captured in his 1956 memoir, is adapted for television on ABC Stage 67. Frank Perry directs, Capote himself narrates, and Geraldine Page (in an Emmy-winning performance) stars.
- December 24 – WPIX in New York City premieres the Yule Log Christmas special which runs every year until 1989 and returns in 2001.

Also in 1966

- The 1951–1953 CBS sitcom Amos & Andy is pulled from syndication broadcast due to complaints from civil rights organizations.
- Construction is completed on the KXJB-TV mast (now KRDK) in rural Traill County, North Dakota. At 2,060 ft. (630m) tall and supported by multiple bundles of guy-wires, it becomes the tallest structure in the world. Today, though it has collapsed twice since its first construction in 1966, it is the tallest structure in the United States, the second-tallest in the Western Hemisphere behind the Petronius oil platform in the Gulf of Mexico, and the seventh-tallest structure in the world.
- Macdonald Carey starts reciting the epigram "Like sands through the hourglass, so are the days of our lives" at the beginning of his soap opera, Days of Our Lives, a tradition that continues over a decade after his death.

== Programs/programmes ==
- American Bandstand (1952–1989)
- Another World (1964–1999)
- Armchair Theatre (UK) (1956–1968)
- As the World Turns (1956–2010)
- Bewitched (1964–1972)
- Blue Peter (UK) (1958–present)
- Bonanza (1959–1973)
- Bozo the Clown (1949–present)
- Candid Camera (1948–present)
- Captain Kangaroo (1955–1984)
- Combat! (1962–1967)
- Come Dancing (UK) (1949–1995)
- Daniel Boone (1964–1970)
- Days of Our Lives (1965–present)
- Dixon of Dock Green (UK) (1955–1976)
- Doctor Who (1963–present)
- F Troop (1965–1967)
- Face the Nation (1954–present)
- Flipper (1964–1967)
- Four Corners (Australia) (1961–present)
- General Hospital (1963–present)
- Get Smart (1965–1970)
- Gilligan's Island (1964–1967)
- Gomer Pyle, U.S.M.C. (1964–1969)
- Grandstand (UK) (1958–2007)
- Green Acres (1965–1971)
- Gunsmoke (1955–1975)
- Hallmark Hall of Fame (1951–present)
- Hogan's Heroes (1965–1971)
- I Dream of Jeannie (1965–1970)
- I Spy (1965–1968)
- Jeopardy! (1964–1975, 1984–present)
- Juke Box Jury (1959–1967, 1979, 1989–1990)
- Lost in Space (1965–1968)
- Love of Life (1951–1980)
- Match Game (1962–1969, 1973–1984, 1990–1991, 1998–1999)
- Meet the Press (1947–present)
- Mission: Impossible (1966–1973)
- My Three Sons (1960–1972)
- Opportunity Knocks (UK) (1956–1978)
- Panorama (UK) (1953–present)
- Perry Mason (1957–1966)
- Petticoat Junction (1963–1970)
- Peyton Place (1964–1969)
- Run for Your Life (1965–1968)
- Search for Tomorrow (1951–1986)
- The Andy Griffith Show (1960–1968)
- The Bell Telephone Hour (1959–1968)
- The Beverly Hillbillies (1962–1971)
- The Dean Martin Show (1965–1974)
- The Doctors (1963–1982)
- The Ed Sullivan Show (1948–1971)
- The Edge of Night (1956–1984)
- The Fugitive (1963–1967)
- The Good Old Days (UK) (1953–1983)
- The Guiding Light (1952–2009)
- The Hollywood Palace (1964–1970)
- The Late Late Show (Ireland) (1962–present)
- The Lawrence Welk Show (1955–1982)
- The Lucy Show (1962–1968)
- The Marvel Super Heroes (1966)
- The Mike Douglas Show (1961–1981)
- The Milton Berle Show (1954–1967)
- The Secret Storm (1954–1974)
- The Sky at Night (UK) (1957–present)
- The Today Show (1952–present)
- The Tonight Show Starring Johnny Carson (1962–1992)
- This Is Your Life (UK) (1955–2003)
- Tom and Jerry (1965–1972, 1975–1977, 1980–1982)
- Top of the Pops (1964–2006)
- Truth or Consequences (1950–1988)
- Voyage to the Bottom of the Sea (1964–1968)
- Walt Disney's Wonderful World of Color(1961–1969)
- What the Papers Say (UK) (1956–2008)
- What's My Line (1950–1967)

=== Debuts ===
- January – Father Brown on West Germany's ARD (1966–1972)
- January 2 – Ultra Q on TBS in Japan (1966)
- January 3 – Eye Guess on NBC-TV Daytime (1966–1969)
- January 11 – Daktari on CBS (1966–1969)
- January 12 – Batman on ABC (1966–1968)
- April 5 – The Money Programme on BBC2 (1966–present)
- June 6 – Till Death Us Do Part on BBC1
- June 27 – Dark Shadows on ABC (1966–1971)
- July 4 – Showdown & Chain Letter both on NBC daytime (canceled on October 14)
- July 11 – The Newlywed Game on ABC (1966–1974)
- July 17 – Ultraman on TBS in Japan (1966–1967)
- July 18 –
  - The Australian version of Play School on that country's ABC (1966–present)
  - The 700 Club (1966–present)
  - W-FIVE (1966–2024)
  - Wojeck (1966–1968)
- September 1 –
  - The Marvel Super Heroes (1966)
- September 8 –
  - Star Trek on NBC (1966–1969)
  - That Girl on ABC (1966–1971)
  - Tarzan on NBC (1966–1968)
- September 9 –
  - The Green Hornet on ABC (1966–1967)
  - The Time Tunnel on ABC (1966–1967)
- September 10 –
  - The New Adventures of Superman (1966–1970)
- September 12 –
  - The Monkees on NBC (1966–1968)
  - Family Affair on CBS (1966–1971)
  - The Iron Horse
  - The Rat Patrol premiere on ABC (both 1966–1968)
- September 13 – The Girl from U.N.C.L.E. on NBC (1966–1967)
- September 17 – Mission: Impossible on CBS (1966–1973)
- September 20 – Rue des Pignons on SRC (1966–1977)
- October 3 – Joe on BBC1
- October 9 – Rocket Robin Hood (1966–1969)
- October 11 – SRC launches its first made-in-Quebec sitcom, Moi et l'autre (1966–1971)
- October 17 – The Hollywood Squares on NBC daytime (1966–1980)
- October 19 – Cliff Dexter on West Germany's ZDF (1966–1968)
- October 29 – The Mighty Heroes on CBS (1966–1967)
- December 23 – Hoolihan & Big Chuck on WJW-TV, Cleveland, Ohio, United States (1966–1979)

=== Ending this year ===
| Date | Show | Debut |
|---|---|---|
| January 8 | Shindig! | 1964 |
| February 6 | Mister Ed | 1961 |
| March 19 | The Donna Reed Show | 1958 |
| March 21 | Ben Casey | 1961 |
| April 1 | The Flintstones | 1960 |
| April 7 | Danger Man (UK) | 1964 |
| April 8 | The Addams Family | 1964 |
| April 12 | McHale's Navy | 1962 |
| April 17 | The Wackiest Ship in the Army | 1965 |
| May 4 | The Patty Duke Show | 1963 |
| May 8 | This Hour Has Seven Days | 1964 |
| May 12 | The Munsters | 1964 |
| May 22 | Perry Mason | 1957 |
| June 1 | The Dick Van Dyke Show | 1961 |
| July 3 | Ultra Q (Japan) | 1966 |
| August 29 | Hullabaloo | 1965 |
| September 3 | The Adventures of Ozzie and Harriet | 1952 |
| September 4 | My Favorite Martian | 1963 |
| October 23 | Peter Potamus | 1964 |
| October 14 | Showdown & Chain Letter | 1966 |
| December 16 | WJW-TV's Shock Theater | 1963 |
| December 23 | Ready Steady Go! | 1963 |
| December 28 | Our Man at St. Mark's | 1963 |

== Births ==
| Date | Name | Notability |
|---|---|---|
| January 13 | Patrick Dempsey | Actor (Grey's Anatomy) |
| January 14 | Dan Schneider | Producer and screenwriter (The Amanda Show, Drake & Josh, Zoey 101, iCarly, Victorious, Sam & Cat, Henry Danger, Game Shakers) |
| January 17 | Joshua Malina | Actor (Sports Night, The West Wing, Scandal) |
| January 20 | Rainn Wilson | Actor and comedian (Dwight Schrute on The Office) |
| January 27 | Tamlyn Tomita | Actress |
| February 2 | Adam Ferrara | Actor |
| February 6 | Rick Astley | English singer |
| February 11 | Armen Chakmakian | Composer |
| February 13 | Neal McDonough | Actor (Band of Brothers, Desperate Housewives, Justified) |
| February 19 | Justine Bateman | Actress (Family Ties) |
| February 20 | Louis Ferreira | Actor |
| February 22 | Rachel Dratch | Actress (Saturday Night Live) |
| February 23 | Mia Michaels | Judge |
| February 25 | Alexis Denisof | Actor (Buffy the Vampire Slayer, Angel) |
| February 25 | Téa Leoni | Actress (Madam Secretary) |
| February 25 | Nancy O'Dell | Television host |
| February 27 | Donal Logue | Canadian-American actor (Grounded for Life, Sons of Anarchy, Vikings) |
| February 27 | Gregg Rainwater | Actor (The Young Riders) |
| February 27 | Bill Oakley | Writer |
| February 28 | David Nevins | Producer |
| March 1 | Paul Hollywood | English chef and television presenter |
| March 1 | Don Lemon | American television journalist |
| March 3 | Michael Davies | United States–based British television game shows producer |
| March 4 | Kevin Johnson | NBA basketball player and former Mayor of Sacramento |
| March 5 | Aasif Mandvi | British-American actor |
| March 11 | Alice Stewart | Political commentator (CNN) (died 2024) |
| March 14 | Elise Neal | Actress (The Hughleys) |
| March 14 | Gary Anthony Williams | Actor (The Boondocks) |
| March 14 | J. Michael Muro | American cinematographer |
| March 22 | Eric Bruskotter | Actor (Tour of Duty) |
| March 22 | Gary Janetti | Actor |
| March 23 | Marin Hinkle | Actress (Once and Again, Two and a Half Men) |
| March 26 | Michael Imperioli | Actor (The Sopranos) |
| April 4 | Nancy McKeon | Actress (The Facts of Life) |
| April 6 | Todd McDermott | Television journalist |
| April 8 | Robin Wright | Actress (Santa Barbara, House of Cards) |
| April 9 | Cynthia Nixon | Actress (Sex and the City) |
| April 10 | Brad William Henke | Actor (Nikki, Going to California, October Road) |
| April 10 | Steve Claridge | Sportscaster |
| April 10 | George Mastras | Television producer |
| April 20 | Paula White | American televangelist |
| April 22 | Jeffrey Dean Morgan | Actor (Supernatural, The Good Wife, The Walking Dead) |
| April 26 | James Barbour | Actor |
| May 1 | Charlie Schlatter | Actor (Diagnosis: Murder, Pet Alien, Loonatics Unleashed, Kick Buttowski: Suburban Daredevil) |
| May 1 | Anne Fletcher | American choreographer, film director, dancer and actress |
| May 5 | Josh Weinstein | Writer |
| May 12 | Stephen Baldwin | Actor (The Young Riders) |
| May 16 | Janet Jackson | Singer & actress (Good Times) |
| May 17 | Hill Harper | Actor (CSI: NY) |
| May 20 | Mindy Cohn | Actress (The Facts of Life) |
| May 20 | Gina Ravera | Actress |
| May 20 | Dan Abrams | American media entrepreneur |
| May 21 | Lisa Edelstein | Actress (House, Girlfriends' Guide to Divorce) |
| May 22 | Johnny Gill | Singer |
| May 23 | H. Jon Benjamin | Actor (Bob's Burgers, Archer) |
| May 27 | Heston Blumenthal | Chef |
| May 28 | Heather Asch | Puppeteer |
| June 8 | Julianna Margulies | Actress (ER, The Good Wife) |
| June 14 | Traylor Howard | Actress (Two Guys and a Girl, Monk) |
| June 17 | Jason Patric | Actor |
| June 21 | Alisyn Camerota | Journalist |
| June 25 | Dikembe Mutombo | NBA basketball player (died 2024) |
| June 27 | J. J. Abrams | Film director |
| June 28 | Sara Stewart | Actress (Sugar Rush) |
| June 28 | John Cusack | Actor |
| June 30 | Mike Tyson | Professional boxer |
| July 4 | Alison Stewart | American television journalist |
| July 7 | Sandra Lee | Author, chef/host |
| July 7 | John Muller | American television journalist |
| July 9 | Pamela Adlon | Actress (King of the Hill, Recess, Time Squad, Squirrel Boy) |
| July 9 | Scott Van Pelt | Talk show host |
| July 11 | Debbe Dunning | Actress (Home Improvement) |
| July 11 | Greg Grunberg | Actor (Felicity, Alias, Heroes) |
| July 13 | David X. Cohen | Writer |
| July 14 | Matthew Fox | Actor (Party of Five, Lost) |
| July 15 | Amanda Foreman | Actress (Felicity) |
| July 15 | Kristoff St. John | Actor (The Young and the Restless) (died 2019) |
| July 15 | Gary Glasberg | Writer, producer (died 2016) |
| July 19 | Nancy Carell | Actress, comedian (Saturday Night Live, The Daily Show, The Office) and wife of Steve Carell |
| July 29 | Richard Steven Horvitz | Actor (The Angry Beavers, Invader Zim, The Grim Adventures of Billy & Mandy, Squirrel Boy, El Tigre: The Adventures of Manny Rivera, Kick Buttowski: Suburban Daredevil) |
| July 31 | Dean Cain | Actor (Lois & Clark: The New Adventures of Superman) |
| August 9 | Patrick Petersen | Actor (Knots Landing) |
| August 14 | Halle Berry | Actress (Living Dolls) |
| August 20 | David Rees Snell | Actor |
| August 25 | Robert Maschio | Actor (Scrubs) |
| August 30 | Michael Michele | Actress (Homicide: Life on the Street, ER) |
| September 1 | Tim Hardaway | NBA basketball player |
| September 2 | Tuc Watkins | Actor (One Life to Live, Desperate Housewives) |
| September 5 | Phillip P. Keene | Actor |
| September 7 | Toby Jones | Actor |
| September 9 | Adam Sandler | Actor and comedian (Saturday Night Live) |
| September 12 | Darren E. Burrows | Actor (Northern Exposure) |
| September 19 | Soledad O'Brien | American broadcast journalist |
| September 22 | Ruth Jones | Actress |
| September 28 | Maria Canals-Barrera | Actress (Wizards of Waverly Place, Justice League, The Proud Family) |
| September 29 | Jill Whelan | Actress (The Love Boat) |
| October 2 | Yokozuna | Professional wrestler (died 2000) |
| October 6 | Jacqueline Obradors | Actress (NYPD Blue) |
| October 8 | Karyn Parsons | Actress (The Fresh Prince of Bel-Air) |
| October 9 | David Cameron | British politician |
| October 11 | Luke Perry | Actor (Beverly Hills, 90210, Riverdale) (died 2019) |
| October 11 | Shawn Ryan | American screenwriter and television producer |
| October 18 | Dave Price | American journalist |
| October 26 | Steve Valentine | Actor (Crossing Jordan) |
| October 28 | Andy Richter | Talk show announcer and comedian (Late Night, Conan) |
| October 28 | Chris Bauer | Actor |
| October 31 | Mike O'Malley | Actor (Yes, Dear, Glee) |
| November 2 | David Schwimmer | Actor (Ross on Friends) |
| November 5 | Monty Halls | Host |
| November 6 | Peter DeLuise | Actor, director and screenwriter (21 Jump Street) |
| November 6 | Lisa Canning | Actress |
| November 8 | Gordon Ramsay | English chef and TV host (Hell's Kitchen, Master Chef, Kitchen Nightmares) |
| November 14 | Curt Schilling | MLB baseball player |
| November 15 | Rachel True | Actress (Half & Half) |
| November 16 | Dave Kushner | Musician |
| November 17 | Daisy Fuentes | Actress |
| November 19 | Shmuley Boteach | TV host and personality (Shalom in the Home) |
| November 22 | Michael K. Williams | Actor (The Wire) (died 2021) |
| November 22 | Nicholas Rowe | Actor |
| November 25 | Billy Burke | Actor |
| November 26 | Garcelle Beauvais | Actress (NYPD Blue, The Jamie Foxx Show) |
| November 29 | John Layfield | WWE personality and business pundit (CNBC, Fox Business, Fox News) |
| December 1 | Katherine LaNasa | Actress |
| December 4 | Fred Armisen | Actor and comedian (Saturday Night Live, Portlandia, Documentary Now!) |
| December 4 | Suzanne Malveaux | American television news journalist |
| December 4 | Carey Means | Voice actor (Aqua Teen Hunger Force) |
| December 5 | Johan Renck | Swedish director |
| December 8 | Matthew Labyorteaux | Actor (Little House on the Prairie) |
| December 8 | Matt Adler | Actor |
| December 8 | Michael Cole | Pro wrestling commentator (WWE) |
| December 9 | Toby Huss | Actor (The Adventures of Pete & Pete, King of the Hill) |
| December 11 | Gary Dourdan | Actor (CSI: Crime Scene Investigation) |
| December 13 | Mike Tirico | American sportscaster |
| December 15 | Molly Price | Actress (Third Watch) |
| December 21 | Michelle Hurd | Actress (Law & Order: Special Victims Unit) |
| December 21 | Kiefer Sutherland | Canadian actor (24, Designated Survivor) and son of Donald Sutherland |
| December 21 | Karri Turner | Actress (JAG) |
| December 21 | Kelly Wallace | Television journalist |
| December 24 | Diedrich Bader | Actor (The Drew Carey Show, Veep, Outsourced) and voice actor (Batman: The Brave and the Bold, The Zeta Project, The Grim Adventures of Billy & Mandy) |
| December 27 | Bill Goldberg | WCW wrestler |
| December 27 | Eva LaRue | Model and actress (All My Children, CSI: Miami) |
| December 30 | Akosua Busia | Actress |

== Deaths ==
| Date | Name | Age | Notability |
|---|---|---|---|
| February 1 | Buster Keaton | 70 | Actor |
| March 3 | Alice Pearce | 48 | Actress (Gladys Kravitz No. 1 on Bewitched) |
| March 3 | William Frawley | 79 | Actor (Fred Mertz on I Love Lucy and Bub O'Casey on My Three Sons) |
| June 19 | Ed Wynn | 79 | Actor, comedian (The Ed Wynn Show) |
| September 14 | Gertrude Berg | 66 | Actress (The Goldbergs) |
| September 28 | Eric Fleming | 41 | Actor (Gil Favor on Rawhide) |
| December 15 | Walt Disney | 65 | Founder of Walt Disney Productions (host of Disney TV series) |

== Television debuts ==
- René Auberjonois – NET Playhouse
- Matt Clark – Ben Casey
- John Cleese – The Frost Report
- Hector Elizondo – The Edge of Night
- Giancarlo Giannini – David Copperfield
- Paul Gleason – Petticoat Junction
- Bill Hunter – Doctor Who
- John Huston – ABC Stage 67
- Harvey Keitel – Hogan's Heroes
- Richard Pryor – The Wild Wild West
- Charlotte Rampling – Five More
- Ron Rifkin – Gidget
- John P. Ryan – Hawk
- Rade Serbedzija – Prikupljanje hrabrosti
- Lyle Waggoner – Gunsmoke
- Ralph Waite – Hawk
- Fred Willard – Hey, Landlord
- Clarence Williams III – Directions

== See also ==
- 1966–67 United States network television schedule
