= Friday night death slot =

Television term

The Friday night death slot (also Friday evening death slot) is a perceived graveyard slot in American television. It implies that a television program in the United States scheduled on Friday nights (typically, between 8:00 and 11:00 p.m. ET) is likely to be canceled.

The term possibly began as a reflection of certain programs' dominance of Friday night in the 1980s and 1990s, which resulted in decreased ratings for those scheduled at the same time. However, this narrative can be contradicted with examples of shows that had consistent audiences on Friday nights over consecutive years despite competition, such as Miami Vice from 1984 to 1989. By the 2000s, the term was used in reference to the belief that young, single Americans rarely watch television on Friday or Saturday nights, thereby removing from the household what is considered the most lucrative demographic for advertisers. With the collapse of the traditional network viewing model where viewers had to be in front of the TV to watch shows (and then the evolution from VCR or DVR capabilities to almost all shows being viewed increasingly through on-demand streaming media), the stigma of Friday night scheduling is much less evident or considered today than in the past.

== Affected series by network ==
=== NBC ===
One of the earliest and most famous examples of the graveyard slot was Star Trek: The Original Series.

The second season of Star Trek aired on Fridays from 8:30–9:30 p.m. (Eastern Time). Although NBC discussed plans to move it to a 7:30–8:30 p.m. slot on Mondays for mid-season, that never occurred. The poor ratings in the time slot affected the show after it, Jerry Van Dyke's sitcom Accidental Family, leading to its failure after less than a season and angering Van Dyke, who was desperate for a hit and openly (but unsuccessfully) campaigned for NBC to give the show a better time slot. After Star Trek fans deluged NBC with a mail-in protest, producer Gene Roddenberry stated that he was promised the same 8:30–9:30 time slot for Season 3, but airing on Monday instead of Friday. However, that would have meant Rowan & Martin's Laugh-In had to start a half-hour later (moving from 9:00 to 9:30). Laugh-In producer George Schlatter saw no reason why his show, which was a ratings smash at the time, had to yield its slot to the poorly rated Star Trek, and he made no secret of his displeasure. Star Trek instead remained on Fridays, moving to the even less desirable 10:00 p.m. timeslot (one that had been used mainly for filler and throwaway documentaries the previous season). Roddenberry lamented, "If the network wants to kill us, it couldn't make a better move."

The following are examples of NBC programs that aired on Friday nights, either originally or after having been moved from another night, before being canceled:

Years aired	Series	Seasons lasted before cancellation
1940–1968	The Bell Telephone Hour	Last season, after 28 years on air. Already one of the last highbrow Golden Age of Television shows on the air, this final season consisted mostly of documentaries and not the concert performances seen and heard in the 27 prior seasons. The series moved back to radio at the end of the season, airing only in reruns.
1965–1974	The Dean Martin Show	Ninth and final season. (Martin would continue hosting Man of the Week Celebrity Roasts for NBC irregularly for the next decade.)
1965–1967	Laredo	Second and final season.
1966–1969	Star Trek	Last season, after 2 years on air at 8:30pm timeslot, third and final season moved to the 10:00pm timeslot.
1967–1968	Accidental Family	Cancelled midway through its only season.
1974	Lotsa Luck	Moved to Friday midway through its only season.
1976–1977	Serpico	First and only season.
1977	Sanford Arms	First and only season. Cancelled after only 4 weeks.
1979–1980	Eischied	First and only season.
1979–1980	Hello, Larry	First and part of the second season. Last 18 episodes were moved to Wednesdays in a failed attempt to boost ratings.
1979–1980	Shirley	First and only season.
1980	Pink Lady	Moved to Friday after its first episode, canceled four weeks after the move with one episode unaired. Widely considered one of the worst TV shows of all time.
1981	Sanford	Second and final season. Its predecessor Sanford & Son had aired, with greater success, on Fridays throughout much of its run.
1982	Cassie & Co.	First and only season.
1982	Jokebook	First and only season. Cancelled after three episodes.
1982–1986	Knight Rider	Fourth and final season.
1983	Mr. Smith	First and only season.
1983	Manimal	First and only season.
1983–1987	The A-Team	Fifth and final season
1984–1986	Riptide	Third and final season
1984–1989	Highway to Heaven	Last eight episodes of its fifth and final season. The network had announced the end of the program in June 1988 as a result of repercussions caused by the 1988 Writers Guild of America strike, along with a decline in ratings during the fourth season.
1991–1993	I'll Fly Away	Moved to Friday during its first season, in February 1992; cancelled in the middle of its second, with the last episode airing February 5, 1993.
1987–1993	A Different World	While not airing previously on Fridays, the show ended its sixth and final season on NBC on July 9, 1993, two months after its proper series finale aired; the show's demise had more to do with it having reached a natural stopping point by 1993.
1987–1997	Unsolved Mysteries	Moved to Friday for its seventh season in the fall of 1994. The ninth season was the last one to air on NBC; the show moved to CBS for its tenth season in 1997, where it continued to air until its original run ended in 1999 after 11 seasons. Lifetime, Spike, and Netflix later revived the show on three different occasions.
1988–1991	Midnight Caller	Third and final season
1988–1992	Dear John	Fourth and final season
1989	The Jim Henson Hour	Cancelled midway through its only season.
1999–2005	Third Watch	Moved from Mondays to Fridays starting with the fifth episode of its fifth season, and ended its run after its sixth season
2002–2003	Boomtown	Moved from Sundays to Fridays for second season, and then cancelled after two episodes; remaining episodes burned off after Christmas
2003	Miss Match	Cancelled during its first and only season, airing only 11 of its 18 episodes in the U.S.
2003	Mister Sterling	First and only season
2004–2005	Medical Investigation	First and only season
2005	Law & Order: Trial by Jury	First and only season
2006	The Book of Daniel	First and only season
2006	Conviction	First and only season
2006–2008	1 vs. 100	Second season; last one to air on NBC. The show would be revived for GSN with a half-hour format in 2010, but was ultimately canceled in late 2011.
2007–2012	Chuck	Renewed for an abbreviated fifth and final season primarily to gain enough episodes for syndication.
2008–2009	Lipstick Jungle	Moved from Wednesdays to Fridays midway for its second and final season
2010	Outlaw	First and only season
2011–2012	Rock Center with Brian Williams	Moved to Fridays (the fourth time slot for the series) partway through its second and final season.
2013–2014	Dracula	First and only season
2014–2016	Undateable	Third and final season
2014–2015	Constantine	First and only season
2015	Truth Be Told	First and only season
2018	Midnight, Texas	Second season
2020	Lincoln Rhyme: Hunt for the Bone Collector	First and only season
2021–2023	Young Rock	Third and final season
2022–2025	Lopez vs. Lopez	Originally aired on Fridays during its first season, before being moved to Tuesdays for its second season; it returned to Fridays for its abbreviated third and final season
2025	Grosse Pointe Garden Society	Moved to Fridays during its first and only season; canceled despite a ratings increase for the remaining episodes.
2025–2026	Stumble	First and only season

=== CBS ===
CBS was the most successful network on Friday nights in the 1980s due to their hit shows Dallas and Falcon Crest. However, both shows were struggling by the end of the decade and were cancelled in the early 1990s. In an effort to revive Friday night television in the 1990s, and to compete with ABC's successful TGIF block of family comedies airing opposite it, CBS first attempted to compete with ABC launching a comedy night in the fall of 1992 with The Golden Palace (a spin-off/continuation of NBC's The Golden Girls), Major Dad and Designing Women, along with a new sitcom from Bob Newhart, Bob. The Golden Girls had been a top-10 hit on Saturday nights for NBC (though it had fallen to 30th in its final season), while Major Dad and Designing Women had also been top-10 hits on Monday nights, and Newhart's previous sitcom, Newhart, had spent most of its run in the top 30. Nevertheless, this effort failed, and only Bob was renewed for the 1993–1994 season, only to end in December 1993. A later effort to counterprogram TGIF, the CBS Block Party (which included former TGIF series Family Matters and Step by Step, both of which were hits for several years while on ABC before both shows were canceled in 1997), met a similar fate in the fall of 1997.

In 2013, CBS moved Vegas to Friday nights to make room for Golden Boy, another police drama. Both shows were eventually cancelled during their first year.

In general, however, CBS has found ways, particularly in the years following the cancellation of the Block Party, to be at least somewhat more successful in the Friday night time slots than its broadcast competitors.

Since 2010, the Blue Bloods franchise has become a staple of Friday nights, first with the titled show and with its spin-off Boston Blue.

The following are all examples of CBS shows that either started on Friday nights and lasted a few episodes, or moved to Friday nights, lost the battle for television ratings, and were eventually cancelled:

Years aired	Series	Seasons lasted before cancellation
1955–1959	The Phil Silvers Show	Fourth and final season.
1958–1960	The Lucy-Desi Comedy Hour	Last thirteen episodes. An hour-long continuation of I Love Lucy that aired sporadically as part of Westinghouse Desilu Playhouse, dwindling ratings and the disintegrating marriage between Lucille Ball and Desi Arnaz led to the show's end.
1966–1973	Mission: Impossible	Moved to Friday midway through its seventh and final season.
1968–1970	The Good Guys	Cancelled midway through its second and final season.
1970	Headmaster	Only season. Lasted 14 episodes.
1971	The New Andy Griffith Show	Only season. Last-minute replacement for Headmaster; lasted 10 episodes. One of many shows caught in the rural purge.
1972–1973, 1977	The Sonny & Cher Comedy Hour	Third season. The program would be moved off Friday nights midway through the season, which contributed to a major spike in viewership. Moved back to Friday nights during its sixth and final season in 1977, when ratings again fell.
1973–1974	Calucci's Department	First and only season.
1973–1974	Roll Out!	First and only season.
1974	Dirty Sally	First and only season.
1974	Planet of the Apes	First and only season.
1975	Big Eddie	First and only season.
1975–1978	Switch!	Moved to Friday and cancelled midway through its third and final season; remaining episodes were burned off during the summer of 1978.
1976	Sara	First and only season.
1976	Spencer's Pilots	First and only season.
1976–1977	Code R	First and only season.
1977	Hunter	First and only season.
1977	Nashville 99	First and only season.
1977–1978	Logan's Run	First and only season.
1986–1993	Designing Women	Seventh and final season.
1987	The Popcorn Kid	First and only season. Lasted only 6 episodes.
1989–1993	Major Dad	Fourth and final season.
1990	Max Monroe: Loose Cannon	First and only season.
1990	The Bradys	First and only season. Dramatic sequel to The Brady Bunch, a sitcom that aired to more success in the 1970s on Fridays.
1990–91	Uncle Buck	Moved to Friday midway through its first and only season.
1992–1993	Bob	Second and final season.
1992–1993	The Golden Palace	First and only season; eighth and final season (only one on CBS) in the continuity of The Golden Girls storyline.
1993	The Boys	First and only season.
1993	The Building	First and only season.
1993–1997	Dave's World	Fourth and final season.
1994–1995	Under Suspicion	First and only season.
1995	Dweebs	First and only season.
1996–2000	Cosby	Moved to Friday midway through its fourth and final season.
1997–1998	Family Matters	Ninth and final season; only season to air on CBS. The show had been hugely successful as part of ABC's TGIF lineup on Friday nights during its eight-year run on the network, placing in the Nielsen Top 50 throughout that period; however after peaking at #15 in its second season (1990–91), it experienced a steady decline in ratings thereafter (falling to #50 in 1996–97). Ratings declined further (dropping to #99) after the show switched networks; Family Matters was pulled from the schedule in January 1998, with most of the back half of season nine being burned off that summer.
1997–1998	Step by Step	Seventh and final season; only season to air on CBS. Like Family Matters, it was a hit on ABC's TGIF lineup for years, but saw its ratings gradually decline starting in season five. Ratings fell further after the show switched networks, with the show falling out of the Nielsen Top 100; Step by Step was pulled from the schedule in February 1998, with the series' final four episodes being burned off that summer.
1997–1998	The Gregory Hines Show	First and only season; only 15 episodes were aired out of 22 produced.
1997	Meego	First and only season; only 6 episodes were aired out of 13 produced.
1997–1999	Unsolved Mysteries	Last two seasons of the original series' run; only two seasons to air on CBS. The show was later revived by Lifetime and Spike on two different occasions.
1997–2005	JAG	Tenth and final season (2004). The series ran on CBS since the second season and moved to Fridays at the beginning of the ninth season.
1999–2005	60 Minutes II	Last three months of the series' run, which had otherwise run on Wednesdays. The series was already heavily damaged by the Killian documents controversy by the time it moved to a burn-off slot on Fridays.
2000–2002	That's Life	Second and final season.
2000–2001	The Fugitive	First and only season. Cancelled on an unresolved cliffhanger.
2001–2002	The Ellen Show	Canceled during its first and only season; only 13 episodes were aired out of 18 produced.
2002–2003	Robbery Homicide Division	Canceled during its first and only season; only 10 episodes were aired out of 13 produced.
2003–2005	Joan of Arcadia	Second and final season.
2004–2005	Dr. Vegas	Canceled during its first and only season; only 5 episodes aired out of 10 produced.
2005–2007	Close to Home	Second and final season.
2007–2008	Moonlight	First and only season.
2008	The Ex List	Canceled during its first and only season; only four episodes were aired out of 13 produced.
2010–2011	The Defenders	Moved to Friday nights midway through its first and only season.
2011–2012	A Gifted Man	Canceled at the end of its first and only season despite high ratings in its timeslot.
2012	Made in Jersey	First and only season; canceled after two episodes. The remaining six episodes were aired on Saturday nights.
2012–2013	Vegas	Moved to Friday nights midway through its first and only season.
2013	The Job	First and only season. Canceled after two episodes due to extremely low ratings.
2018	TKO: Total Knock Out	Moved to Friday nights midway through its first and only season.
2018–2019	Whistleblower	Second and final season.
2018–2022	Magnum P.I.	Fourth season; last one to air on CBS. The series ran on CBS from the beginning and moved to Fridays at the beginning of the second season and stayed there until its fourth season. After being canceled by CBS, the series was picked up by NBC, where it remained until it concluded in January 2024 after five seasons.
2022	Come Dance with Me	First and only season.
2017	S.W.A.T	Eighth and final season. The series moved to Fridays at the beginning of its fifth season after suffering declining ratings during its fourth season, and was then moved to Sundays midway through the season in a successful attempt to increase viewership. CBS canceled the series after six seasons in May 2023, but reversed the decision shortly thereafter and subsequently announced two additional seasons one at a time. The series concluded in May 2025 after eight seasons.

=== ABC ===
TGIF was a successful block for ABC, which ran from 1989 to 2000 (although the network had been running a sitcom block on Fridays beginning in 1987); it focused primarily on family-friendly sitcoms. The network had also had success with a block featuring The Partridge Family and The Brady Bunch in the same time slots during the early 1970s. Following the slow collapse of TGIF in the late 1990s, Friday night has fallen into a lower priority for the network.

In September 2018, ABC cleared the 9:00 p.m. Eastern time slot on Friday nights to make room for the expansion of 20/20 to two hours as a result of ABC News changing the program's format to include true crime stories in an attempt to address the program's declining viewership.

The following are examples of ABC network shows that started on Friday nights and lasted a few episodes, or were moved to Friday nights, lost the battle for television ratings, and were eventually canceled:

Years aired	Series	Seasons lasted before cancellation
1960–1966	The Flintstones	Sixth and final season. The first three seasons aired in the same time slot to much greater success before moving to Thursdays, then back to Fridays at the end of its run.
1966–1969	The Felony Squad	Third and final season
1966–1967	The Green Hornet	First and only season
1967–1970	The Flying Nun	It moved from Wednesday nights partway through its third and final season.
1968–1970	The Ghost and Mrs. Muir	Second and final season. The first season aired on NBC on Saturdays but the show moved to ABC after NBC decided to drop the series from their schedule. The first half of its second season aired on Thursdays, before moving to Fridays.
1968–1970	Here Come the Brides	Second and final season. This series struggled due to lack of support from affiliates.
1973–1974	Adam's Rib	First and only season
1974	Kodiak	First and only season. Cancelled after four episodes.
1981–1982	Darkroom	First and only season
1981–1982	Strike Force	First and only season. The show provoked controversy over its level of violence.
1982	The Phoenix	First and only season
1984	Masquerade	Cancelled midway through its first and only season.
1986	Sidekicks	First and only season
1987	Dolly	The show originally aired on Sundays and premiered to strong ratings, drawing 39.47 million viewers. As ratings declined, it was moved to a Saturday timeslot, where viewership dropped further, contributing to the show's eventual cancellation. The series lasted only one season and was cancelled after 10 episodes.
1997–1998	You Wish	Cancelled midway through its first and only season after seven episodes; the remaining six episodes were burned off during the summer of 1998.
1998–1999	Two of a Kind	First and only season
1998–2001	Two Guys and a Girl	Fourth and final season.
1999–2000	Odd Man Out	First and only season.
1999–2001	The Norm Show	Third and final season (2001). Although initially subject to stellar ratings, the second season saw ratings fluctuate due to timeslot changes.
1999–2002	Once and Again	Third and final season
2002–2005	8 Simple Rules	Third and final season. The series moved to this timeslot when ratings declined following the death of star John Ritter early in the previous season.
2002–2004	Life with Bonnie	Second and final season
2004–2005	Complete Savages	First and only season
2005	Hot Properties	First and only season
2006–2010	Ugly Betty	Fourth and final season (2009). The series moved to this timeslot due to disappointing ratings during season three in its previous Thursday timeslot. It moved to Wednesday nights partway through the season.
2006	In Justice	First and only season
2007	National Bingo Night	First and only season; canceled after six episodes.
2007–2008	Women's Murder Club	First and only season; remaining three episodes aired on Tuesday nights during the May 2008 sweeps period.
2007–2008	Duel	Last ten episodes of the show's run, which served as a replacement program due to the 2007–08 Writers Guild of America strike. After initially airing as a miniseries of six episodes over the course of a single week in December 2007, the series was picked up for an additional ten episodes; only five of those episodes aired before the series was cancelled due to extremely low ratings. The remaining five episodes were aired during the summer.
2009	Surviving Suburbia	Moved to Friday midway through its first and only season.
2009	The Goode Family	Moved to Friday midway through its first and only season.
2011–2013	Happy Endings	Third and final season. The final 10 episodes of the series moved to this timeslot in March 2013, due to disappointing ratings on Tuesdays when it was paired with Don't Trust the B— in Apartment 23, having previously lost Modern Family as its season two lead-in.
2011–2018	Once Upon a Time	Seventh and final season.
2012–2013	Malibu Country	First and only season.
2012–2014	The Neighbors	Second and final season, although its lead-in, Last Man Standing, was renewed for its fourth season.
2014–2015	Cristela	First and only season.
2015–2018	Quantico	Moved to Friday midway through its third and final season.
2015–2020	Fresh Off the Boat	Moved to Friday nights for its fifth season; renewed for a sixth and final season in 2019; concluded in February 2020.
2016–2019	Speechless	Third and final season.

=== Fox ===
The network most associated with "Friday Night Death Slot" has been Fox.

In January 2011, the sci-fi drama Fringe, then in its third season, was moved into this slot from Thursdays. According to Fox Entertainment President Kevin Reilly, nearly half of Fringe's viewership time shifts the show to watch at their convenience, and that "if it does anywhere near what it did on Thursdays, we can glue that show to the schedule because it can be a big win for us". The Fox network created a promotional advertisement for Fringe that lampooned its reputation of the Friday night death slot prior to Fringe's move. Despite encountering lower ratings after its move, Fringe was renewed for a fourth season, and later for a shortened final fifth season to allow the creators to complete the story arc they had set out at the start of the program as well as to reach 100 episodes, allowing the show to be resold in syndication. Critics praised Fox for taking the risk and profit lost on the show to satisfy the creators' desires and fans' requests to complete the show's primary story. The series finale aired on January 18, 2013.

After 20 years of unsuccessfully trying to find programming to fill the Friday night death slot, Fox gave up, leaving a one-hour empty hole on that night in the 9:00 p.m. (Eastern Time) hour for the 2013–14 schedule. Encores of Fox programming from the previous week originally aired in that timeslot. However, in November 2013, in the hopes of revitalizing Fox's Friday ratings, the sitcom Raising Hope moved from Tuesdays to Fridays for its fourth season, airing in the 9 p.m. half-hour; the freshman sitcom, Enlisted premiered in the 9:30 p.m. slot before both series swapped timeslots in late January. This "encore slot" was made a permanent part of the schedule for the 2014–15 season. Fox did not include such a slot in 2015–16, but the show chosen to fill the 9:00 p.m. time slot was the low-budget panel game World's Funniest Fails.

In October 2019, Fox cleared its Friday night time slots to make way for WWE SmackDown, which ran on the network until September 2024, after which the show moved to USA Network. Following the end of the show's run on Fox, the network would make sports programming a permanent part of its Friday night schedule, including college football, college basketball, the NASCAR Craftsman Truck Series' "Drivers Only" race, and its own in-house league, the UFL; reruns of the network's entertainment programming airs during weeks when sporting events are not scheduled.

The following are all examples of Fox shows that either started on Friday nights and lasted only a few episodes, or were moved to Friday nights, suffered from dismal ratings, and were eventually canceled.

Years aired	Series	Seasons lasted before cancellation
1993–1994	The Adventures of Brisco County, Jr.	First and only season. Music from the show was later utilized for coverage of the Olympic Games.
1994–1995	M.A.N.T.I.S.	First and only season; cancelled in March 1995 after 20 episodes were aired. The remaining two episodes would be aired two years after the show's cancellation.
1995	VR.5	First and only season; cancelled after ten of thirteen episodes were aired.
1995–1996	Strange Luck	First and only season.
1998–2001	World's Wildest Police Videos	Fourth season; last one to air on Fox. The show moved to Friday midway through its third season, and received a fourth season order primarily to acquire enough episodes for syndication. After the series concluded its run on Fox, occasional specials continued to air until 2003. The series would later revived by Spike for a fifth season in 2012.
1999–2000	Harsh Realm	First and only season; cancelled after three episodes were aired with the remaining six airing on FX.
2000–2006	Malcolm in the Middle	First nine episodes of its seventh and final season. The series, which had already acquired enough episodes for syndication after five seasons, had suffered ratings declines because of time slot fluctuations and was moved to Friday to avoid further preemptions due to sports coverage. The remaining episodes of the season aired in the show's normal Sunday time slot, and the series concluded in May 2006.
2000	FreakyLinks	Cancelled midway through its first and only season.
2000–2002	Dark Angel	Second and final season.
2000–2004	Boston Public	Moved to Friday at the beginning of its fourth and final season. Two episodes remained unaired until they were broadcast in off-network syndication in 2005.
2001–2006	The Bernie Mac Show	Fifth and final season. The show received a fifth season order primarily to acquire enough episodes for syndication, and concluded in April 2006 after the show's cancellation was announced earlier in the year.
2002	The Chamber	Moved to Friday after the first two episodes of its first and only season; canceled after only one episode aired on Friday, leaving three of its six episodes unaired.
2002–2003	Firefly	Canceled during its first and only season, leaving three of its fourteen episodes unaired.
2002–2003	Fastlane	Moved to Friday midway through its first and only season.
2002–2003	John Doe	First and only season.
2003	Wanda at Large	Second and final season.
2003	Luis	Cancelled during its first and only season, airing only 5 of its 10 episodes in the U.S.
2003–2006	Arrested Development	While not airing previously on Fridays, the series ended its third and final season on Fox with a four-episode airing in a two-hour timeslot on February 10, 2006, against the 2006 Winter Olympics opening ceremony. The series was later revived for two additional seasons by Netflix in 2013.
2004	Wonderfalls	First and only season; cancelled after four out of its thirteen episodes were aired. The remaining episodes were released on DVD.
2005	Jonny Zero	First and only season; remaining episodes aired in Australia in 2007.
2005	Killer Instinct	First and only season
2005–2009	Prison Break	Moved to Friday midway through its fourth season. Revived in 2017 for a fifth season in a non-Friday slot.
2006	Vanished	Moved to Friday midway through its first and only season.
2006	Justice	Moved to Friday midway through its first and only season.
2006–2007	Standoff	Moved to Friday midway through its first and only season.
2007	The Wedding Bells	First and only season
2008	The Return of Jezebel James	First and only season
2008	Canterbury's Law	Moved to Friday midway through its first and only season
2007–2009	Are You Smarter Than a 5th Grader?	Third season of its original run, last one to air on Fox. A half-hour version began airing on MyNetworkTV and syndication outlets with a different format starting in September 2009; the show was cancelled following its second season in syndication, marking the end of the show's original run after five seasons. The show was later revived by Fox and Nickelodeon on two different occasions.
2007–2009	Don't Forget the Lyrics	Third season of its original run, last one to air on Fox. A half-hour version began airing on MyNetworkTV and syndication outlets with a new format in 2010, but the half-hour version was cancelled after only one season, marking the end of the show's original run after four seasons. Fox would revive the show with a modified version of its original format in 2022.
2008–2009	Terminator: The Sarah Connor Chronicles	Moved to Friday midway through its second and final season.
2009	Brothers	First and only season; moved to Sundays midway through the season.
2009–2010	'Til Death	Received a fourth season order primarily to gain enough episodes for syndication, and was moved to Fridays for the early part of the season.
2009–2010	Dollhouse	Second and final season
2010	The Good Guys	Moved to Friday midway through its first and only season.
2010–2014	Raising Hope	Fourth and final season
2012	The Finder	Moved to Friday midway through its first and only season.
2012–2013	Touch	Second and final season.
2013–2017	Sleepy Hollow	Fourth and final season.
2014	Rake	Moved to Friday midway through its first and only season.
2014	Utopia	Moved to Fridays less than a month into its first and only season; canceled one month later after 12 episodes due to extremely low ratings.
2015–2017	Rosewood	Moved to Friday midway through its second and final season.
2016	Second Chance	Moved to Friday midway through its first and only season.
2018–2019	The Cool Kids	First and only season
2019	Proven Innocent	First and only season

=== The WB ===
Years aired	Series	Seasons lasted before cancellation
2000–2001	Popular	Second and final season.
2001–2002	Maybe It's Me	First and only season.
2001–2002	Raising Dad	First and only season.
2002–2003	Greetings from Tucson	First and only season.
2004	The Help	First and only season.
2005–2006	Twins	First and only season. Used before the holdover to The CW.

=== Other networks ===
WWF SmackDown! was first broadcast on UPN on Thursdays to compete with WCW Thunder (eventually forcing Thunder to Wednesdays because of high ratings for SmackDown!, before a majority of the assets belonging to WCW were ultimately purchased by Vince McMahon in 2001). UPN moved the show to Friday nights in the United States on September 9, 2005, because of low ratings in its original Thursday night slot, and the show retained its Friday night time slot after moving to The CW in September 2006. Upon its move to the "death slot," UPN/The CW Friday nights saw a substantial increase in ratings over UPN's movies and most of The WB's sitcoms. SmackDown! had also initially garnered even better ratings in the death slot than the ratings on its former Thursday night airings (after WCW was bought by the WWF in 2001). Despite this, The CW chose not to renew SmackDown's contract in 2008 due to the change of the demographic of the network's viewers (shifting more towards women 12–34 years of age), and the show moved to MyNetworkTV that fall, eventually leaving network television altogether with a move to Syfy in 2010. SmackDown then moved to the USA Network in 2016, thus sharing the same network as WWE's flagship show, Raw. As previously noted, the show moved to Fox and return to Friday nights in 2019.

UPN also moved Star Trek: Enterprise to Friday nights at the start of its fourth and final season in 2004. UPN was subject to heavy sports pre-emptions by local affiliates on Friday nights in the Major League Baseball, high school football, and NHL/NBA seasons, pushing it to late night. A good number of viewers thus chose to watch the show's weekend repeat whenever it was offered by their UPN affiliate, though the network and the show's Internet fanbase heavily discouraged watching it, as it was an unrated airing by Nielsen.

In the spring of 2015, The CW's Cedric's Barber Battle fell victim to the Friday night death slot, only airing 8 episodes out of the 10 produced before being pulled off the schedule completely.

== Exceptions ==
Despite its reputation, Friday night prime time has also seen numerous successful series run for multiple years. The aforementioned Dallas rated in the Top 10 of the Nielsen ratings for seven consecutive seasons and was the top-rated series for three of those seasons. It also aired the all-time most watched non-series finale single U.S. television episode (in the 1980 resolution episode of the internationally prominent Who Shot J.R. cliffhanger). The Dukes of Hazzard, which preceded Dallas on Friday nights from 1979 to 1985, was rated in the Top 20 in the Nielsen ratings during its first four seasons before falling in the ratings in its fifth (the season in which series stars John Schneider and Tom Wopat left due to their salaries and merchandising royalties), sixth, and seventh seasons. The Incredible Hulk, which aired on Friday nights during most of its run, went for five seasons to decent success in the ratings before being abruptly and controversially cancelled midway through its fifth season. In the 1990s, two shows that found success on Friday nights were Fox's The X-Files and NBC's Homicide: Life on the Street. The former show did so well on Fridays that it became an attractive option for the network to try to move past an all-comedy Sunday night lineup when it made the move to 9 p.m. ET in 1996 (and did well for several years afterwards), while the latter was mainly placed on Friday nights because NBC's dominant 1990s lineup had no place for the show on any other prime one-hour spot (it was considered for the Thursday 10 p.m. ET spot heading into the 1994–95 season, but the network went with ER there instead).

Falcon Crest, which aired after Dallas from 1981 to 1990, went for nine seasons with successful ratings, reaching the Top 25 in the Nielsen ratings in its first six seasons before dropping in the ratings in its final three seasons. In the 1970s, NBC's Sanford and Son cracked the Top 10 throughout its run except in its final season, despite airing its entire run on Friday nights. The Rockford Files, which made the Top 30 in only its first season, ran for six seasons on NBC on Friday nights and received critical acclaim by being nominated for eighteen Emmys, winning five. During the 1980s, NBC aired the popular police drama Miami Vice on Friday nights for five seasons. Its popularity was due to the show's fashions, pastel colors, expensive cars, and incorporation of various popular songs of that era in the show, which resonated with younger fans who were into MTV. Annual telecasts of the movie The Wizard of Oz were aired by CBS on Friday nights beginning in 1979 with success after many years of Sunday evening airings.

ABC was often successful Friday night, especially with family-friendly sitcoms. During several periods since 1989, ABC has branded their Friday night programming block TGIF. TGIF series have included Perfect Strangers, Full House, Family Matters, Boy Meets World, and Sabrina, the Teenage Witch. ABC Friday night sitcom successes prior to TGIF include Benson, Webster, and Mr. Belvedere. During the early 1970s, ABC had a successful Friday-night comedy lineup with The Brady Bunch, The Partridge Family, Room 222, Love, American Style, and The Odd Couple. More recently, Last Man Standing enjoyed a six-season run on ABC with the last five seasons airing on Friday nights. The show remained on Friday nights in 2018 after switching networks to Fox. ABC's newsmagazine program 20/20 has aired on Friday nights most of the time since 1987, placing in the Top 20 of the Nielsen ratings for several years in the 1990s.

Law and Order: Special Victims Unit developed a large audience on NBC on Friday nights when it was moved there from Mondays in the middle of the first season in January 2000. SVU remained on Fridays through the second, third, and fourth seasons before moving to Tuesdays in season five in September 2003. Now airing on Thursdays, SVU entered its 26th season in September 2024. Following SVU on NBC, another wildly successful show, The Blacklist, took up the death slot for nearly 8 full seasons before being moved to a Wednesday 10/9c schedule in the middle of 2021.

More recently, the CBS fantasy series Ghost Whisperer enjoyed a successful five-season run on Friday nights, as did the reboot MacGyver, which also ran for five. Later shows Hawaii Five-0, Magnum P.I., Fire Country, and Blue Bloods also fared well, though they appealed to older audiences who were more likely to stay home on Friday nights (CBS typically targets a slightly older key demographic than its competitors). From 2014 to 2016, the long-running reality TV series The Amazing Race moved from Sunday to Friday nights. The Amazing Race moved out of its Friday schedule for the 29th season and now aired on Thursdays, as of March 2017.

The CW show Supernatural was moved to Friday for its sixth and seventh seasons, allegedly to test its true drawing power compared to the station's glitzier drama shows. Many fans, knowing about the 'death slot', feared that this meant it was on its way to being cancelled, but it increased in viewership. This led to the network moving it back into mid-week scheduling, eventually back to its original WB slot, Tuesdays. In 2015, midseason, the show was moved to Wednesday evenings, where it had also aired. For a majority of the show's run, the program was scheduled on Thursdays, Mondays being the only weekday it was not aired on, and it maintained its audience in all time slots. The network's own iterations of Whose Line Is It Anyway? and Penn & Teller: Fool Us have survived the Friday slot for multiple years.

Cable networks Disney Channel and Cartoon Network have long been successful on Friday nights with children's program blocks. Cartoon Network's original programming success on this night began in 1999 with the launch of Cartoon Cartoon Fridays (later known as simply Fridays), a two-hour block of original animated series during primetime that included series such as Dexter's Laboratory, The Powerpuff Girls, Cow & Chicken, Johnny Bravo, Samurai Jack, Foster's Home for Imaginary Friends, and Camp Lazlo. After the block was discontinued in 2007, Cartoon Network shifted its programming towards more action-oriented series such as Star Wars: The Clone Wars and Ben 10 in the Friday primetime slot. Disney Channel did not begin airing original programming on Friday evenings until 2001; premieres of its made-for-cable films moved to that night from Saturdays that year. This was followed by its original series in 2007 (which had aired during the two hours preceding the designated "death slot" period); since then, Disney Channel has been successful with its original programming on that night (which have included popular series such as Hannah Montana, Wizards of Waverly Place, Jessie, Girl Meets World, and The Suite Life on Deck – the latter of which was the number one series among children between ages 6 and 12 in 2008). Its original movies have also generally performed well on Friday nights; in particular, the August 17, 2007, premiere of High School Musical 2 was the channel's highest-rated made-for-cable film to date and holds the Nielsen record for the highest-rated made-for-cable movie premiere and the highest-rated non-sports program in the history of basic cable, watched by 17.2 million viewers.

== See also ==
- Dump months, the equivalent of the Friday night death slot in the annual North American movie calendar
