= Jerry Van Dyke =

American actor and comedian (1931–2018)

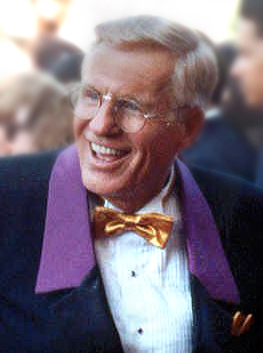
- Van Dyke in 1990
- Born: Jerry McCord Van Dyke; July 27, 1931; Danville, Illinois, U.S.
- Died: January 5, 2018 (aged 86); Malvern, Arkansas, U.S.
- Occupations: Actor; comedian
- Years active: 1962–2015
- Spouses: Carol Johnson (m. 1957; div. 1974); Shirley Ann Jones (m. 1977)
- Children: 3, including Kelly Jean
- Relatives: Dick Van Dyke (brother); Barry Van Dyke (nephew); Shane Van Dyke (great-nephew)
- Military career
- Allegiance: United States
- Branch: United States Air Force
- Units: Special Services
- Conflicts: Korean War

Jerry McCord Van Dyke (July 27, 1931 – January 5, 2018) was an American actor and comedian. He was the younger brother of Dick Van Dyke.

Van Dyke had a long and successful career mostly as a character actor in supporting and guest roles on popular television series. He made his television acting debut on The Dick Van Dyke Show with several guest appearances as Rob Petrie's brother, Stacey. From 1989 to 1997, he played Luther Van Dam on the popular series Coach.

== Early life ==
Jerry McCord Van Dyke was born in Danville, Illinois, on July 27, 1931, to Hazel Victoria (née McCord), a stenographer, and Loren Wayne "Cookie" Van Dyke, a salesman. He was of Dutch, English, Irish, and Scottish descent.

== Career ==
=== Early career ===
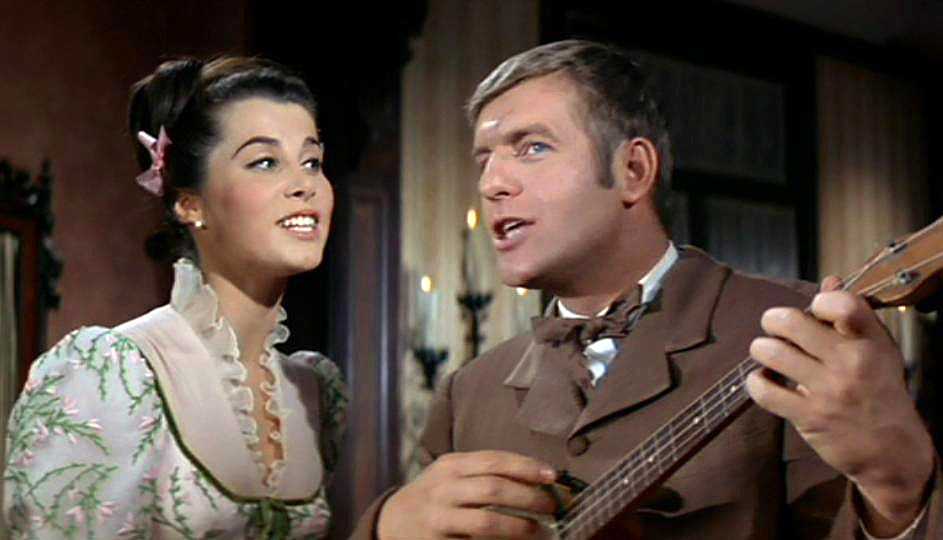
Van Dyke with Stefanie Powers in McLintock! (1963)

Van Dyke pursued a stand-up comedy career while still in Danville High School and was already a veteran of strip joints and nightclubs when he joined the United States Air Force Tops In Blue in 1954 and 1955. During the mid-1950s, Van Dyke worked at WTHI-TV in Terre Haute, Indiana. The Jerry Van Dyke Show, which included future CBS News Early Show news anchor Joseph Benti, Nancee South and Ben Falber, was popular fare. In the service, he performed at military bases around the world, twice winning the All Air Force Talent Show.

Following his first guest appearances on The Dick Van Dyke Show and two others on CBS's The Ed Sullivan Show, CBS made him a regular on The Judy Garland Show. He was also given hosting chores on the 1963 game show Picture This. In that same year, movie audiences saw him in supporting roles in McLintock!, Palm Springs Weekend and The Courtship of Eddie's Father.

=== Television career ===
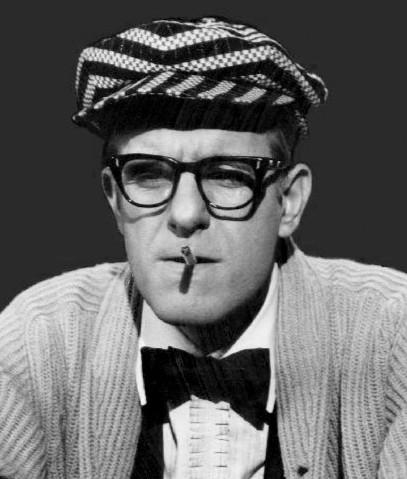
Van Dyke in a publicity photo for Accidental Family (1967)

In 1963 Van Dyke was cast on an episode of GE True, hosted by Jack Webb. When The Judy Garland Show was unsuccessfully revamped, Van Dyke left the program. He turned down the offer to play Gilligan on Gilligan's Island, a role which instead went to Bob Denver. He appeared as a guest star in one episode of The Andy Griffith Show. He also appeared in a 1964 episode of The Cara Williams Show. Van Dyke finally accepted the lead role of attorney David Crabtree in My Mother the Car (1965), the misadventures of a man whose deceased mother Gladys (voiced by Ann Sothern) is reincarnated as a restored antique car. Though the series was a commercial failure, Van Dyke continued to work steadily in supporting television and film roles through the rest of the decade.

He starred in another short-lived situation comedy Accidental Family (1967) as widowed comedian Jerry Webster who buys a farm to raise his son while he is not away on professional tours. Well received by critics, Van Dyke was upset when NBC scheduled the show for Fridays at 9:30pm, sandwiched between the poorly-rated Star Trek and filler documentaries, known as the Friday night death slot, leading to the show's failure.

He was also featured in Love and Kisses (1965) and as Andy Griffith's co-star in Angel in My Pocket (1969).

During the 1970s, Van Dyke returned to stand-up comedy. He spent much of the decade touring Playboy Clubs around the country and headlining venues in Las Vegas and Reno, Nevada, Summerfest in Milwaukee, and in Atlantic City, New Jersey. He returned to television for guest appearances on Love, American Style and Fantasy Island. In 1973, he portrayed Wes Callison, Children's Comedy Writer, on the season three episode "But Seriously, Folks" on The Mary Tyler Moore Show. He also had roles in The Amazing Cosmic Awareness of Duffy Moon (1976) and 13 Queens Boulevard (1979). Also in 1989, he appeared as a panelist in the pilot for the revival of Match Game, hosted by Bert Convy.

In 1988, Van Dyke made a guest appearance on Scott Baio's sitcom Charles in Charge as Jamie Powell's health teacher Mr. Merkin. In 1989, he began portraying beloved, yet befuddled, assistant coach Luther Van Dam on the long-running series Coach. For this role, Van Dyke received four Emmy Award nominations from 1990 through 1994 for "Outstanding Supporting Actor in a Comedy Series".

=== Later career ===
In 1995, Van Dyke appeared in a series of Hardee's commercials to promote the Big Hardee, then in the late 1990s acted as the spokesperson for Big Lots. He had a recurring role on Yes, Dear as Big Jimmy, the father of Jimmy Hughes. He made a guest appearance on a September 2008 episode of My Name Is Earl and in 2010 he made an appearance on the second-season episode, "A Simple Christmas" of the television series, The Middle, playing Frankie's father, Tag Spence. He returned in "Thanksgiving III" in November 2011, "Thanksgiving IV" in November 2012, "From Orson with Love" in May 2013, "Thanksgiving V" in November 2013. and "Flirting with disaster" in March 2015. Van Dyke also played the object of Maw Maw's affections on the 18th episode of the first season of Raising Hope. In a December 2013 episode of The Millers he played Bud Miller, father to Margo Martindale's character, Carol. In his final television role in April 2015, he reprised his role as Frankie's father on The Middle, along with real-life brother Dick Van Dyke playing his character's brother.

== Personal life ==
Van Dyke was married twice and had three children with first wife Carol: Jerri Lynn, Kelly Jean, and Ronald. Kelly Jean died by suicide in 1991, following struggles with substance abuse.

Jerry and his second wife, Shirley, lived on an 800-acre (324-hectare) ranch near Hot Springs, Arkansas.

Van Dyke was an avid poker player and announced a number of poker tournaments for ESPN in the late 1990s and early 2000s. He was also a four-string banjo player with several performances on The Dick Van Dyke Show to his credit.

== Death ==
On January 5, 2018, Van Dyke died from heart failure at his ranch in Hot Spring County, Arkansas, at the age of 86. He had been in declining health after a car accident two years earlier.

== Filmography ==
=== Film ===
Year	Title	Role	Notes
1963	The Courtship of Eddie's Father	Norman Jones	
1963	Palm Springs Weekend	Biff Roberts	
1963	McLintock!	Matt Douglas Jr.	
1965	Love & Kisses	Freddy	
1969	Angel in My Pocket	Emery	
1987	Death Blow: A Cry for Justice	Bernard Blackwell	
1988	Run If You Can	Brian	
1992	To Grandmother's House We Go	Harvey 'Harv'	TV movie
1997	Annabelle's Wish	Grandpa Baker	TV movie
1997	Merry Christmas, George Bailey	Uncle Billy	TV movie
2001	Surviving Gilligan's Island	Himself	TV movie
2011	Moon Ring	Darrell	

=== Television ===
Year	Title	Role	Notes
1962-1965	The Dick Van Dyke Show	Stacey Petrie	4 episodes
1962	The Ed Sullivan Show	Himself	2 episodes
1962	G.E. True	Corporal Bailey	Episode: "The Handmade Private"
1962	The Andy Williams Show	Himself	Episode: "Tammy Grimes/Jerry Van Dyke"
1963	The Garry Moore Show	Himself	Episode: "Dorothy Loudon, Keely Smith, Jerry Van Dyke"
1963	Picture This	Host	12 episodes
1963-1964	The Judy Garland Show	Himself	9 episodes
1964	Perry Mason	James Douglas	Episode: "The Case of the Woeful Widower"
1964	The Hollywood Palace	Himself	Episode: "1.15"
1964	The Cara Williams Show	Carter Devereaux III	Episode: "Cara Fiddles While Her Hero Burns"
1965	The Andy Griffith Show	Jerry	Episode: "Banjo Playing Deputy"
1965-1966	My Mother the Car	Dave Crabtree	30 episodes
1967	That Girl	Howie	Episode: "Leaving the Nest Is for the Birds"
1967	Vacation Playhouse	George/Goggle's Father	2 episodes
1967-1968	Accidental Family	Jerry Webster	16 episodes
1967	Kraft Music Hall	Himself	Episode: "How the West Was Swung"
1968	Good Morning World	Jerry Carroll	Episode: "Partner, Meet My Partner"
1968	Gomer Pyle: USMC	Jerry Ball	Episode: "Gomer and the Night Club Comic"
1968	Dick Van Dyke	Himself	Special
1970-1971	Love, American Style	Dwayne Barone/Gordon/John Pettidrew	3 episodes
1970	Headmaster	Jerry Brownell	14 episodes
1972-1973	The Mary Tyler Moore Show	Wes Callison	2 episodes
1973	The New Dick Van Dyke Show	Mickey Preston	Episode: "Big Brother is Watching You"
1976	ABC Afterschool Special	Mr. Finley	Episode: "The Amazing Cosmic Awareness of Cosmic Moon"
1976	Van Dyke and Company	Dick Van Dyke (voice)	Episode: "1.3"
1978-1981	Fantasy Island	Mr. Brennan/Fred Cooper	2 episodes
1979	13 Queens Boulevard	Steven Winters	9 episodes
1980	House Calls	Dr. Duane Kellogg	Episode: "The Dead Beat"
1982	The Love Boat	Norman Quigley	Episode: The Groupies/The Audition/Doc's Nephew"
1983	Newhart	Roy Herzog	Episode: "You're Homebody 'til Somebody Loves You"
1986	Fresno	Tucker Agajanian	Miniseries
1988	Coming of Age	Shopkeeper	Episode: "The Sopwith Pup"
1988	Charles in Charge	Mr. Merken	Episode: "The Blackboard Bungle"
1989-1997	Coach	Luther Van Dam	199 episodes
1997	The Drew Carey Show	Luther Van Dam	Episode: "Drew Gets Married"
1997	Grace Under Fire	Luther Van Dam	Episode: "Vegas"
1997-1998	You Wish	Grandpa Max	10 episodes
1998	Teen Angel	Jerry Beauchamp	6 episodes
1998	The New Addams Family	The Burglar	Episode: "Halloween with the Addams Family"
1999	Diagnosis: Murder	Stacy Sloan	Episode: "Sleeping Murder"
2001-2005	Yes, Dear	Big Jimmy Hughes	7 episodes
2004	The District	Judge Beers	Episode: "The Black Widow Maker"
2004	The Dick Van Dyke Show Revisited	Stacey Petrie	TV special
2005	Committed	Walker	Episode: "The Snap Out of It Episode"
2008	My Name Is Earl	Jerry	Episode: "Stole an RV"
2010-2015	The Middle	Tag Spence	8 episodes
2011	Raising Hope	Mel	Episode: "Cheaters"
2013	The Millers	Bud	Episode: "Carol's Parents are Coming to Town"
