= Accidental Family =

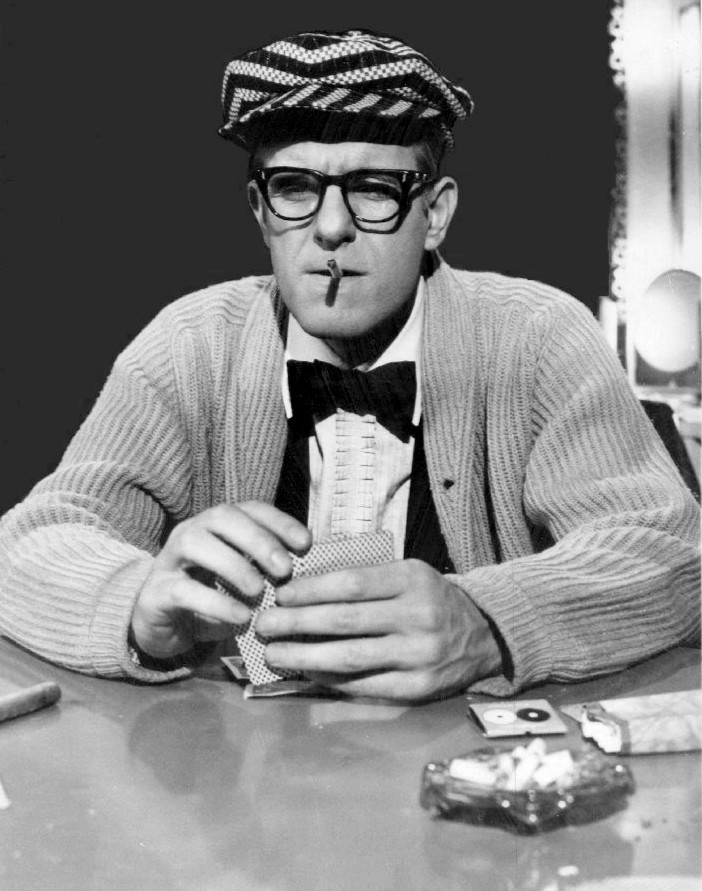
- Jerry Van Dyke as Jerry Webster.
- Genre: Sitcom
- Created by: Melville Shavelson
- Starring: Jerry Van Dyke; Lois Nettleton
- Composer: Earle Hagen
- Country of origin: United States
- Original language: English
- No. of seasons: 1
- No. of episodes: 16

Production
- Executive producer: Sheldon Leonard
- Producer: Sy Gomberg
- Camera setup: Multi-camera
- Running time: 22–24 minutes
- Production companies: Sheldon Leonard Productions, in association with NBC

Original release
- Network: NBC
- Release: September 15, 1967 – January 5, 1968

Accidental Family is an American sitcom broadcast on NBC during the first part of the 1967–68 U.S. television season. The show ran for sixteen episodes, from September 15, 1967, to January 5, 1968.

The show aired on Fridays at 9:30pm, sandwiched between the non-sitcoms Star Trek and documentaries, which was not considered an auspicious timeslot. The program consistently lost in the Nielsen ratings to both the CBS Friday Night Movies and the ABC Western The Guns of Will Sonnett, and as a result was cancelled midseason. It was initially replaced by the first prime time run of the game show Hollywood Squares.

The show's star, Jerry Van Dyke, publicly groused about the show's timeslot, complaining that nobody watched the show because of its competition. By October 13 — the airdate of the fourth episode — Van Dyke was already declaring defeat in the Arizona Daily Star. "In this business you've got to have such confidence," he said, "and I never did, so I'm beginning to wonder about myself. I'll tell you; I could use a success about now, and I believe this is a good show, but we've got to get out of that Friday night."

== Synopsis ==
Van Dyke starred as a widowed comedian, Jerry Webster, who bought a farm in the San Fernando Valley to serve as a place for him to raise his son, Sandy, when he was not touring or working in Las Vegas. When he was on the road, Sandy was under the care of the farm's manager, divorcee Sue Kramer (Lois Nettleton), who had a daughter the same age as Webster's son.

== Reception ==
The Pasadena Star-News published a post-mortem about the show in November 1967, "Accidental Family: Cancellation Was No Accident", which praised the show and its potential, and laid the blame for cancellation on television networks' lack of interest in producing high-quality programs. "Critics were quite favorable to the show in their first reviews," the piece claimed. "And the series deserved the praise. It had a low-key, slapstick humor; a touching but non-cloying evolvement of the father-son relationship; some clever, knowing conversations between the two adults, both in the same marital and parental boat; it had an almost hip quality." The piece also said, "It was different in several ways from the current crop of comedies — it didn't hang itself on a gimmick — no witches with twitches, no defrosted ancestors, no broadly slapstick broads-in-law. Just two kids, two parents, farm life contrasted with a touch of Las Vegas life, and the human, humorous situations thereof."

In April 1968, Jerry Van Dyke was a guest on Dick Van Dyke, a comedy/variety special hosted by his more famous brother. The special joked about the recent demise of Accidental Family; when Jerry asked Dick if he saw the show, Dick said, "No, I was out of town that week."

== Cast ==
Actor	Role
Jerry Van Dyke	Jerry Webster
Lois Nettleton	Sue Kramer
Teddy Quinn	Sandy Webster
Susan Benjamin	Tracy Kramer
Larry D. Mann	Marty Warren
Ben Blue	Ben McGrath

== Episodes ==
No.	Title	Directed by	Written by	Original release date
1	"Everywhere a Chick Chick"	Sheldon Leonard	Melville Shavelson	September 15, 1967
2	"Hot Kid in a Cold Town"	Bob Sweeney	Story by : Richard Sale & Mary Loos; Teleplay by : James L. Brooks & Richard Sale & Mary Loos	September 22, 1967
3	"If You Knew Martha"	Bob Sweeney	Saul Turtletaub & Bernie Orenstein	October 6, 1967
4	"Minnesota Tracey"	Unknown	Unknown	October 13, 1967
5	"It Hurts Me More Than It Hurts You"	Bob Sweeney	Saul Turteltaub & Bernie Orenstein	October 20, 1967
6	"Halloween's on Us"	Earl Bellamy	Story by : Barry E. Blitzer & Ray Brenner; Teleplay by : Joseph Bonaduce	October 27, 1967
7	"The Making of a Vegetarian"	Bob Sweeney	Jim Brooks	November 3, 1967
8	"The Secret Life of Jerry Webster"	Earl Bellamy	Jack Sher	November 10, 1967
9	"A Funny Thing Happened on the Way to the Playground"	Bob Sweeney	Treva Silverman & Peter Meyerson	November 17, 1967
10	"What Is This - Thanksgiving or a Nightmare?"	Gary Nelson	Peggy Elliott & Ed Scharlach	November 24, 1967
11	"The Woodsman"	Bob Sweeney	Sam Bobrick & Bill Idelson	December 1, 1967
12	"The Return of Mr. Ex"	Robert Day	Story by : Dale McRaven & Carl Kleinschmitt; Teleplay by : Joseph Bonaduce	December 8, 1967
13	"The Lush Life"	Unknown	Unknown	December 15, 1967
14	"The Treasure of San Fernando Valley"	Gary Nelson	Sydney Zelinka	December 22, 1967
15	"Sandy Gets Tough"	George Tyne	Dick Bensfield & Perry Grant	December 29, 1967
16	"Who's Been Sleeping in Daddy's Bed?"	Don Appell	Bill Idelson & Harvey Miller	January 5, 1968
