= The Pruitts of Southampton =

1966 American comedy TV series

- Also known as: The Phyllis Diller Show
- Genre: Situation comedy
- Created by: David Levy (based on the novel House Party by Patrick Dennis)
- Starring: Phyllis Diller; Gypsy Rose Lee; Reginald Gardiner; Richard Deacon; Grady Sutton; Pam Freeman; John Astin; Marty Ingels; Paul Lynde; Lisa Loring
- Theme music composer: Vic Mizzy (two different themes were used during the season)
- Composer: Vic Mizzy
- Country of origin: United States
- Original language: English
- No. of seasons: 1
- No. of episodes: 30 [17 Pruitts of Southampton/13 Phyllis Diller Show]

Production
- Executive producer: David Levy
- Producers: Nat Perrin; Everett Freeman
- Camera setup: Multi-camera
- Running time: 30 min.
- Production companies: Filmways TV Productions, in association with PhilDil Productions Limited

Original release
- Network: ABC
- Release: September 6, 1966 – April 7, 1967

The Pruitts of Southampton is an American situation comedy that aired during the 1966-67 season on the ABC network. The show was based on the novel House Party (1954) by Patrick Dennis. It was ABC's attempt to turn female stand-up comic Phyllis Diller into a sitcom comedienne very much in the style of Lucille Ball. Child actress Lisa Loring formerly of TV's The Addams Family also had a small role on the show as Phyllis's daughter Suzy Pruitt.

The program starred Diller as Phyllis Pruitt, and featured Gypsy Rose Lee and Richard Deacon in supporting roles with Diller feeling the series was an inverted version of The Beverly Hillbillies. The show's producers originally sought comic actress Beatrice Lillie in the Diller role. Exteriors of the Biltmore Estate in Asheville, North Carolina were used as the locale.

In 2002, TV Guide ranked it number 20 on its TV Guide's 50 Worst TV Shows of All Time list.

== Premise ==
The Pruitts, a supposedly incredibly wealthy family living on Long Island in the Hamptons, have been approached by the Internal Revenue Service about overdue taxes. An audit revealed that the Pruitts were in fact broke. Rather than reveal this fact publicly and cause the economic depression which would presumably result, an improbably charitable IRS allowed them to continue living in their mansion and maintaining the pretensions of great wealth, which was difficult given their reduced circumstances. By mid-season, in order to raise more money, Phyllis Pruitt had opened the mansion to boarders, attracting a "nutty" collection of tenants as well, a group that included Paul Lynde as her hopeless brother, John Astin as her brother-in-law, and Marty Ingels as a handyman.

In the premiere episode, Phyllis Pruitt unsuccessfully tries to roast a turkey in a front-loading washing machine.

== Development and history ==
The show was created by executive producer David Levy, who also served in the same capacity on the ABC television series The Addams Family from 1964 to 1966. When ABC canceled that show in the spring of 1966, a few Addams Family alumni were recruited for the Diller series. Vic Mizzy, who composed the finger-snapping theme song to The Addams Family, composed the musical theme for Diller's show as well.

According to Television magazine, The Pruitts of Southampton finished 77th among the 91 shows rated during the 1966–1967 season. It began the season airing on Tuesdays, opposite The Red Skelton Hour on CBS, which finished second in the ratings.

On January 13, 1967, with the episode "Little Miss Fixit", the program changed its title to The Phyllis Diller Show. John Astin, who played Gomez Addams on The Addams Family, joined the cast the same month, and the show began airing on Fridays. In addition, the series marked a reunion for Astin and Marty Ingels who had starred in the 1962-1963 ABC-TV sitcom, I'm Dickens, He's Fenster.

In the fall of 1968, NBC signed Diller to a weekly variety series hoping that the comedian would have the same kind of success that Carol Burnett had achieved for the rival network CBS. The program, entitled The Beautiful Phyllis Diller Show, did poorly in ratings and was canceled after three months.

== Episode list ==
No.	Title	Directed by	Written by	Original release date
1	"Phyllis Goes Broke"	Gene Nelson	T : Stanley Roberts; S/T : Lawrence J. Cohen, Fred Freeman	September 6, 1966
2	"Phyllis, the Milkmaid"	Oscar Rudolph	T : Leo Rifkin; S/T : Sidney A. Mandel, Roy Kammerman	September 13, 1966
3	"Phyllis Beats the Rap"	Nat Perrin	Lou Derman, Elon Packard	September 20, 1966
4	"Phyllis, Take a Letter"	Unknown	Unknown	September 27, 1966
5	"Phyllis, the Cookie Tycoon"	Unknown	Unknown	October 4, 1966
6	"Phyllis Fires the Butler"	Unknown	Unknown	October 11, 1966
7	"Phyllis Saves the Day"	Unknown	Unknown	October 18, 1966
8	"Phyllis Goes Commercial"	Unknown	Unknown	October 25, 1966
9	"Phyllis Entertains Royalty"	Unknown	Unknown	November 1, 1966
10	"Phyllis, the Upstairs Girl"	Unknown	Unknown	November 15, 1966
11	"Phyllis, the General Stealer"	Unknown	Unknown	November 22, 1966
12	"Phyllis, the Dress Maker"	Unknown	Howard Harris, Sydney Zelinka	November 29, 1966
13	"Phyllis Goes Arty"	Unknown	Unknown	December 6, 1966
14	"Santa Was a Lady"	Unknown	Lou Derman, Elon Packard	December 13, 1966
15	"The Hubcap Caper"	Nat Perrin	Lou Derman, Elon Packard	December 20, 1966
16	"Phyllis, Queen of the Road"	Hollingsworth Morse	Lou Derman, Elon Packard	December 27, 1966
17	"My Brother Harvey"	Unknown	Unknown	January 3, 1967
18	"Little Miss Fixit"	Arthur Lubin	Unknown	January 13, 1967
First episode as The Phyllis Diller Show
19	"Learn to Be a Millionaire"	Nat Perrin	Lou Derman, Elon Packard	January 20, 1967
20	"The Ghost of Pruitt Mansion"	Unknown	Unknown	January 27, 1967
21	"Portrait of Krump"	Unknown	Unknown	February 3, 1967
22	"How to Rob a Millionaire"	Nat Perrin	Lou Derman, Elon Packard	February 10, 1967
23	"Nobody Here But Us Chickens"	Unknown	Unknown	February 17, 1967
24	"Phyllis, the Bat Girl"	Arthur Lubin	Lou Derman, Elon Packard	February 24, 1967
25	"Marry a Million"	Unknown	Unknown	March 3, 1967
26	"Goddess of Love"	Unknown	Unknown	March 10, 1967
27	"My Sister-in-Law Phyllis"	Ralph Levy	S : Carol & Joseph Cavella; T : Nat Perrin	March 17, 1967
28	"Krump, the Playboy"	Unknown	Unknown	March 24, 1967
29	"Phyllis, the Beauty Queen"	Arthur Lubin	Unknown	March 31, 1967
30	"The House Is Not a Zoo"	Arthur Lubin	Unknown	April 7, 1967
