= The Tammy Grimes Show =

American sitcom TV series (1966)

- Genre: Situation comedy
- Created by: George Axelrod
- Directed by: Don Taylor
- Starring: Tammy Grimes; Hiram Sherman; Dick Sargent; Maudie Prickett
- Theme music composer: John Williams
- Composers: John Williams; Warren Barker
- Country of origin: United States
- Original language: English
- No. of seasons: 1
- No. of episodes: 16 (4 aired, 12 unaired)

Production
- Executive producer: William Dozier
- Producers: Richard Whorf; Alex Gottlieb
- Cinematography: Ralph Woolsey
- Camera setup: Single-camera
- Running time: 22–26 minutes
- Production companies: Greenway Productions; Tamworth Productions; 20th Century Fox Television

Original release
- Network: ABC
- Release: September 8 – September 29, 1966

The Tammy Grimes Show is an American sitcom starring Broadway actress Tammy Grimes that aired during the 1966–67 season on the ABC network. In an era in American television where even low-rated shows were usually given 13 weeks on the air to find an audience, The Tammy Grimes Show was one of the few primetime series of the era canceled after only four episodes.

== Overview ==
Grimes played Tammy Ward, a spendthrift heiress under the financial thumb of her Uncle Simon (Hiram Sherman). The series also stars Dick Sargent (billed as Richard) as Tammy's uptight twin brother Terrance, with whom she works at their Uncle Simon's bank. Maudie Prickett appeared as Tammy's nosy housekeeper.

== Reception ==
Upon its September 8, 1966 premiere, the series received generally negative reviews and failed to find an audience. In an unusual move for a major television network at the time, ABC opted to cancel the series after just four episodes. The Tammy Grimes Show is one of the few primetime series of the era that was canceled after one month as major networks, at the time, generally allowed a series to run a full 13 weeks. Starting from October 6, the show was replaced by The Dating Game.

In a 1967 interview, executive producer William Dozier called the series an "organized disaster". He added, "It was the wrong idea for the wrong person at the wrong time. Movies were not for Mary Martin; television was not for Tammy Grimes."

== Production notes ==
The Tammy Grimes Show was created by George Axelrod and executive produced by William Dozier. The series was produced by Richard Whorf and Alex Gottlieb, and filmed at 20th Century Fox Studios in Century City, Los Angeles.

The theme was written by composer John Williams (credited as "Johnny Williams"), with Lionel Newman. Williams also wrote the incidental music, except for the first episode, which was scored by Warren Barker.

== Cast ==
- Tammy Grimes as Tamantha "Tammy" Ward
- Hiram Sherman as Uncle Simon
- Dick Sargent as Terrence Ward

== Episode list ==
ABC aired four episodes of the series. The original pilot episode, written by Axelrod (in which Tammy posed as a "Texas millionaire" to apply for the bank's credit card, sparking a spending spree), was never shown; scenes from it were presented during ABC's "fall preview" presentation at their annual affiliate meeting in the summer of 1966. A fifth episode entitled "The Great Charge Account War" was scheduled to air on October 6, 1966, but ABC pulled the episode from its lineup after it canceled the series in late September 1966. Scripts for 11 additional episodes were written, but were never produced.

Episode #	Episode title	Writer	Director	Original airdate	Synopsis	Guest actors
1	"Officer's Mess"	Ralph Goodman	Don Taylor	September 8, 1966	Tammy gets stuck on a naval ship.	Henry Jones, Philip Ober
2	"How to Steal a Girl, Even If It's Only Me"	Roland Wolpert	Don Taylor	September 15, 1966	Tammy supposedly gets kidnapped.	Jesse White, Paul Mantee, Monroe Arnold, Richard Bakalyan, Damian O'Flynn
3	"Tammy Takes Las Vegas, or Vice Versa"	Thomas Knickerbocker & Al Schwartz	Don Taylor	September 22, 1966	Tammy tries to win a bundle at the casinos.	Max Mellinger
4	"Positively Made In Paris"	–	–	September 29, 1966	In order to keep her from spending money on clothes, Tammy is exiled to a rural hamlet.	Philip Coolidge, Maurice Marsac, Harry Harvey Sr., Cherie Fister, Bryan O'Brynne
5	"George Washington Didn't Sleep Here"	Jack Raymond, Sid Morse	–	Never aired	To help publicize a friend's hotel, Tammy spreads a rumor claiming the "Marchinoness of Mull" is to be an honored guest.	
6	"The Great Charge Account War"	Bill O'Hallaren	Never produced	–	–	
7	"The Ski's the Limit"	Charles Marion, Irving Cummings	Never produced	–	–	
8	"Give Her Back to the Indians"	George F. Slavin, Stanley Adams	Never produced	–	–	
9	"How I Saved the Opera, Or Did I?"	Harry Winkler, Hannibal Coons	Never produced	–	–	
10	"Send a Rich Girl to Camp This Summer"	Gene Thompson	Never produced	–	–	
11	"Tammy Plays Cupid"	Stan Dreben, Howard Merrill	Never produced	–	–	
12	"Diamonds Are a Bird's Best Friend"	John Barbour, Whitey Mitchell	Never produced	–	–	
13	"Tamantha Nightingale Rides Again"	Al Gordon, Hal Goldman	Never produced	–	–	
14	"A Funny Thing Happened to Me on the Way to the Studio"	Bob Reitman, Don Garey	Never produced	–	–	
15	"It's in the Bag, Dad"		Never produced	–	–	
16	"My Twin Sister"	George Axelrod	Never produced	–	–	
