= The Man Who Never Was (TV series) =

Television series

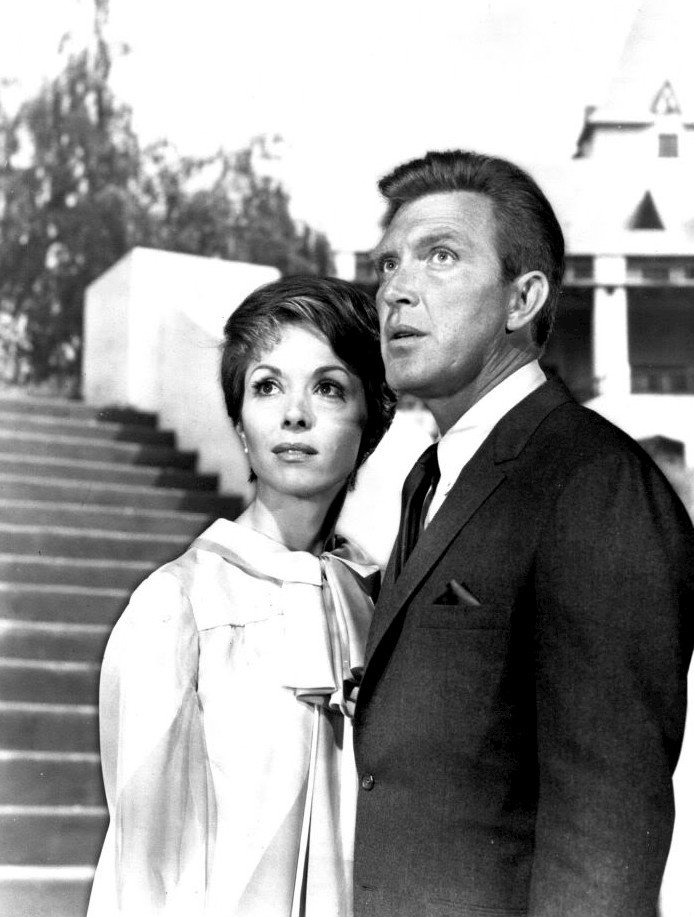
- Dana Wynter and Robert Lansing.
- Created by: John Newland
- Starring: Robert Lansing; Dana Wynter
- Composer: Frank Cordell
- Country of origin: United States
- Original language: English
- No. of seasons: 1
- No. of episodes: 18

Production
- Running time: 30 minutes
- Production company: Palomino Productions in association with 20th Century Fox Television

Original release
- Network: ABC
- Release: September 7, 1966 – January 4, 1967

The Man Who Never Was is a 1966 ABC-TV 20th Century Fox Television television series starring Robert Lansing and Dana Wynter. It has no connection with the better-known book and film of the same name, and ran for only one season of 18 episodes between September 7, 1966, and January 4, 1967. It was produced by 20th Century Fox Television, was filmed in Europe with the pilot episode being filmed in Berlin and Munich. John Newland produced and directed most of the episodes. The original television pilot starred Canadian actor Don Harron as Mark Wainwright but a change in sponsor led to the new sponsor requesting Robert Lansing in the role.

== Plot ==
Lansing initially plays the dual role of Peter Murphy, an American spy, and Mark Wainwright, an influential playboy millionaire who is his exact double. One evening, as the spy is being chased through the streets, he sees Wainwright drunkenly stumbling out of a bar. Stunned at the physical resemblance, Murphy unwittingly allows enemy agents to kill Wainwright, after which he assumes his identity. Although Wainwright's wife, Eva, realises immediately that Murphy is not her husband, she allows him to continue the impersonation, partly because it is financially convenient, and partly because she is moved by his kind treatment of her, in comparison to her abusive husband. Murphy and Eva eventually fall in love. In the final episode, "I Take This Woman", which aired on January 4, 1967, Murphy decides to quit being a secret agent. He proposes marriage to Eva, who accepts, which ended the series, making this one of the few TV shows to have a definite ending. Two movies were later made by editing episodes together, "The Spy with the Perfect Cover" and "Danger Has Two Faces"; both have the final scene from the last episode, but one version of it was re-filmed with the same dialogue.

== Cast ==
- Robert Lansing as Peter Murphy/Mark Wainwright
- Dana Wynter as Eva Wainwright
- Murray Hamilton as Col. Jack Forbes
- Alexander Davion as Roger Barry
- Paul Stewart as Paul Grant

== Episode list ==
No.	Title	Directed by	Written by	Original release date	Prod. code
1	"One Plus One - Equals One"	John Newland	Story by : Merwin Gerard; Teleplay by : Teddi Sherman & Judith Plowden	September 7, 1966	1201
2	"The Last of Peter Murphy"	John Newland	Merwin Gerard	September 14, 1966	1202
3	"Search for a Bent Twig"	John Newland	Judith & Robert Guy Barrows	September 21, 1966	1203
4	"All That Lia Ever Wanted"	John Newland	William Bast	September 28, 1966	1208
5	"Escape"	John Newland	Robert C. Dennis	October 5, 1966	1204
6	"Death in Vienna"	John Newland	Frank Moss	October 12, 1966	1205
7	"A Little Ignorance"	John Newland	Merwin Gerard	October 19, 1966	1209
8	"Target: Eva"	Walter Doniger	Story by : Edmund Morris; Teleplay by : William Bast & Edmund Morris	October 26, 1966	1210
9	"The Big Fish"	John Newland	Donald James	November 2, 1966	1206
10	"Pay Now, Pray Later"	John Newland	Dick Carr	November 9, 1966	1211
11	"Games of Death"	John Newland	Story by : Lewis Pine; Teleplay by : Robert C. Dennis	November 16, 1966	1212
12	"If This Be Treason"	John Newland	Judith & Robert Guy Barrows	November 23, 1966	1207
13	"To Kill an Albatross"	John Newland	Story by : Donald James; Teleplay by : Judith & Robert Guy Barrows	November 30, 1966	1213
14	"Things Dead and Done"	John Newland	Frank Moss	December 7, 1966	1214
15	"The Perfect Crime"	John Newland	Cliff Todd	December 14, 1966	1215
16	"In Memory of Davos"	John Newland	Judith & Robert Guy Barrows	December 21, 1966	1216
17	"Drop By Drop"	Unknown	Unknown	December 28, 1966	1217
18	"I Take This Woman"	John Newland	Patricia Falken Smith	January 4, 1967	1218
