= Jericho (1966 TV series) =

- Genre: Drama; Spy fiction
- Created by: Richard Levinson; William Link; Merwin A. Bloch
- Directed by: Allen Baron; Richard C. Sarafian; Barry Shear
- Starring: John Leyton; Don Francks; Marino Masé
- Theme music composer: Jerry Goldsmith
- Composers: Lalo Schifrin; Robert Drasnin; Jerry Goldsmith; Richard Shores; Morton Stevens
- Country of origin: United States
- Original language: English
- No. of seasons: 1
- No. of episodes: 16

Production
- Executive producer: Norman Felton
- Producer: David Victor
- Camera setup: Single-camera
- Running time: 48 mins.
- Production companies: Arena Productions; MGM Television; CBS Productions

Original release
- Network: CBS
- Release: September 15, 1966 – January 19, 1967

Jericho is an American espionage series set during World War II. The series stars John Leyton, Don Francks and Marino Masé as secret agents, and aired on CBS from September 1966 to January 1967.

== Plot and production ==
Norman Felton who had previously co-produced The Man from U.N.C.L.E. came up with the idea of a World War II espionage series produced by his Arena Productions through Metro-Goldwyn-Mayer Television for the CBS television network. The characters were perhaps inspired by the Jedburgh teams consisting of three agents, American Office of Strategic Services Army Captain Franklin Shepphard (Francks) expert in psychological warfare, Special Operations Executive Royal Navy Lieutenant Nicholas Gage (Leyton) expert in demolitions, and French Air Force Lt. Jean-Gaston Andre (Masé) skilled in small arms. Each week the three performed a mission behind enemy lines using their skills in espionage and sabotage where they met a guest star. Eric Braeden, who would be one of the stars of the more successful World War II series The Rat Patrol (which began that same season), was one of the guest stars in the pilot.

The Jericho theme was composed by Jerry Goldsmith, although Goldsmith did not score the pilot episode "Upbeat and Underground" (Lalo Schifrin composed the music for the pilot and a theme which was never used) - Goldsmith's theme came from his score for "A Jug of Wine, A Loaf of Bread and Pow!"

The series was canceled after 16 episodes. It primarily failed as it was shown opposite ABC's popular Batman.

== Episodes ==
No.	Title	Directed by	Written by	Original release date
1	"Dutch and Go"	Barry Shear	Sheldon Stark	September 15, 1966
2	"A Jug of Wine, a Loaf of Bread, and Pow!"	Richard C. Sarafian	Max Ehrlich	September 22, 1966
3	"Upbeat and Underground"	Richard Donner	Story by : William Link & Richard Levinson; Teleplay by : Dean Hargrove & William Link & Richard Levinson	September 29, 1966
4	"Have Traitor, Will Travel"	Alex March	Jackson Gillis	October 6, 1966
5	"Panic in the Piazza"	Sherman Marks	Norman Borisoff	October 13, 1966
6	"The Big Brass Contraband"	Richard C. Sarafin	Alvin Boretz	October 20, 1966
7	"Wall to Wall Kaput"	Richard C. Sarafian	Irv Tunick	October 27, 1966
8	"Eric the Redhead"	Richard C. Sarafian	Jerome Ross Irve Tunick	November 3, 1966
9	"One for the Mountain: Part 1"	Barry Shear	Sy Salkowitz	November 10, 1966
10	"Two for the Road: Part 2"	Barry Shear	Sy Salkowitz	November 17, 1966
11	"Four O'Clock Bomb to London"	Allen Baron	Stanford Sherman	December 1, 1966
12	"Long Journey Across a Short Street"	Richard C. Sarafian	Jackson Gillis William Koenig	December 8, 1966
13	"Both Ends Against the Riddle"	Murray Golden	Jackson Gillis	December 15, 1966
14	"Jackal of Diamonds"	Alexander Singer	Don Tait	December 29, 1966
15	"A Switch in Time"	Allen Baron	Stanley Niss	January 5, 1967
16	"The Loot of All Evil"	Allen Baron	Tony Barrett Palmer Thompson	January 19, 1967

== Soundtrack ==
In June 2005, Film Score Monthly released an album of music from the series, twinned with the score Johnny Williams composed for the unsold pilot The Ghostbreaker (also produced by Arena Productions and Metro-Goldwyn-Mayer Television) - the latter score occupies tracks 13–22.

1. Jericho Main Title - Jerry Goldsmith (1:04)
2. A Jug of Wine, a Loaf of Bread, and Pow! - Jerry Goldsmith (10:52)
3. Upbeat and Underground - Lalo Schifrin (8:47)
4. Dutch and Go - Morton Stevens (4:38)
5. Have Traitor, Will Travel - Morton Stevens (2:29)
6. The Big Brass Contraband - Richard Shores (3:41)
7. Wall to Wall Kaput - Richard Shores (2:07)
8. Eric the Redhead - Gerald Fried (5:33)
9. One for the Mountain - Richard Shores (3:16)
10. Two for the Road - Richard Shores (4:49)
11. Four O'clock Bomb to London - Richard Shores (4:29)
12. Alternate Main Title - Lalo Schifrin (:45)
13. The Ghostbreaker Main Title (1:01)
14. Teaser (3:39)
15. Act I: The Spooked Skyscraper Strikes Again (2:08)
16. Men of Unitran (1:44)
17. Act II: Accent the Supernatural (3:00)
18. Greensleeves (1:24)
19. Act III: Don't Trip Over Diablo (3:57)
20. Organ Piece (2:31)
21. Act IV: To Outspook a Spook (6:25)
22. End Credits (:49)

== DVD release ==
On June 16, 2015, Warner Bros. released Jericho – The Complete Series on DVD via their Warner Archive Collection. This is a manufacture-on-demand (MOD) release, available through Warner's online store and Amazon.com.
