= The Jean Arthur Show =

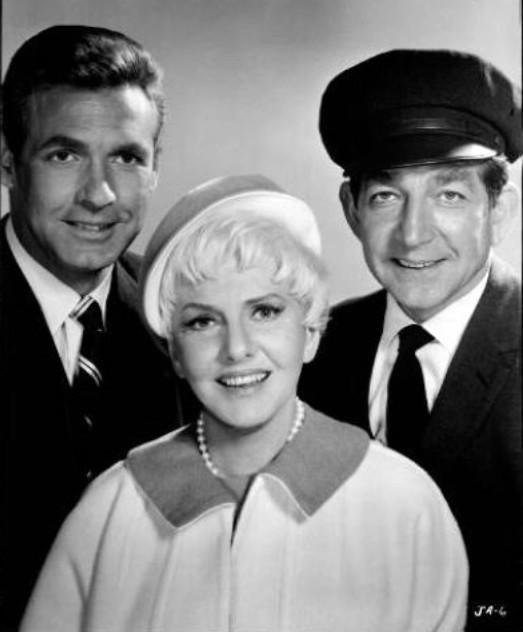
- L-R: Ron Harper, Jean Arthur and Leonard Stone
- Genre: Sitcom
- Created by: Norm Leibmann and Ed Haas
- Starring: Jean Arthur; Ron Harper; Richard Conte; Leonard Stone
- Theme music composer: Johnny Keating; Jay Richard Kennedy; Richard Quine
- Opening theme: "Merry Merry-Go-Round", by Johnny Keating, Richard Quine and Jay Richard Kennedy
- Composer: Johnny Keating
- Country of origin: United States
- Original language: English
- No. of seasons: 1
- No. of episodes: 12

Production
- Executive producers: Richard Quine; Jay Richard Kennedy
- Producer: Si Rose
- Camera setup: Multi-camera
- Running time: 22–24 minutes
- Production company: Universal Television

Original release
- Network: CBS
- Release: September 12 – December 5, 1966

The Jean Arthur Show is an American situation comedy that aired on CBS from September 12 to December 5, 1966.

== Premise ==
Defense attorney Patricia Marshall was an attractive, eligible widow who practiced law with her son Paul, a 25-year-old recent graduate of law school. Episodes centered around her activities with clients and members of her family.

== Cast ==
- Jean Arthur as Patricia, a lawyer who works alongside her son Paul
- Ron Harper as Paul Marshall, a lawyer who works alongside his mother Patricia
- Richard Conte as Richie Wells, an ex-gangster with a romantic interest in Patricia
- Leonard Stone as Morton, the chauffeur of the lawyer duo

=== Guest stars ===
- Carl Ballantine
- Ray Bolger
- Michael Constantine
- Clint Howard
- Mickey Rooney
- Olan Soule
- Dick Wilson

== Reception ==
The Jean Arthur Show ranked number 65 in the ratings, and lasted only 12 episodes.

== Episodes ==
| No. | Title | Directed by | Written by | Original release date |
|---|---|---|---|---|
| 1 | "Lament of a Horseplayer" | Unknown | Unknown | September 12, 1966 |
| 2 | "My Client, the Rooster" | Alan Rafkin | Ed James & Seaman Jacobs | September 19, 1966 |
Patricia agrees to defend a friend who is being sued by a neighbor...only to find Paul represents the neighbor. With Clint Howard, Rance Howard, Jo de Winter, Olan Soule.
| 3 | "Blackstone, Italian Style" | Unknown | Unknown | September 26, 1966 |
| 4 | "The Lady or the Tiger" | Unknown | Unknown | October 3, 1966 |
| 5 | "Rich Man, Poor Man" | Richard Quine | Richard and Mary Sale | October 10, 1966 |
| 6 | "Did Clarence Darrow Start This Way?" | Unknown | Unknown | October 17, 1966 |
| 7 | "The Friendly Speed Trap" | Unknown | Unknown | October 24, 1966 |
| 8 | "Rocky, Take a Letter" | Unknown | Unknown | November 7, 1966 |
| 9 | "A Slight Case of Music" | Unknown | Unknown | November 14, 1966 |
| 10 | "With This Hood, I Thee Wed" | Unknown | Unknown | November 21, 1966 |
| 11 | "Along Came a Spider" | Unknown | Unknown | November 28, 1966 |
| 12 | "The Lady and the Gangster" | Unknown | Unknown | December 5, 1966 |

== Production ==
The Jean Arthur Show was filmed by Universal Television in Hollywood. Richard Quine was the producer. The series was sponsored by General Foods. It was canceled by the network on October 12, 1966, and replaced with To Tell the Truth.

== Critical response ==
In a review distributed by the Associated Press, Cynthia Lowry called The Jean Arthur Show "a comedy series that had everythiing except comedy scripts". Lowry commended Arthur's efforts in the series and the program's production quailty but summarized, "... no one could overcomethe handicap of those dreary stories".
