= Our Place (American TV series) =

- Genre: Musical variety
- Written by: Bill Angelos; Buz Kohan
- Directed by: John Moffitt
- Presented by: Rowlf the Dog
- Country of origin: United States
- Original language: English
- No. of seasons: 1
- No. of episodes: 10

Production
- Executive producer: Bob Precht
- Producers: Bill Angelos; Buz Kohan
- Camera setup: Multi-camera
- Running time: 48 mins.
- Production companies: Ilson/Chambers/Henson Productions; Sullivan Productions

Original release
- Network: CBS
- Release: July 2 – September 3, 1967

Our Place is an American musical variety show that aired on CBS during the summer of 1967. The official "host" was one of Jim Henson's early Muppets, Rowlf the Dog. The show's other regulars were comedians Jack Burns and Avery Schreiber and the singing Doodletown Pipers.

== Overview ==
Our Place, a summer replacement for The Smothers Brothers Comedy Hour, debuted on July 2, 1967. The first episode featured Carol Burnett as guest star. Burnett portrayed an anti-love protest marcher and a singer who couldn't spell, which created problems when she tried to perform Oklahoma and Mother. Musical numbers included a straight performance of Stormy Weather by Burnett. The Doodletown Pipers performed "Up, Up and Away", "Hang On Sloopy", "Georgy Girl", "A Hard Day's Night", "Feeling Good", "California Dreamin'" and "Our Place".

The last telecast of Our Place was on September 3, 1967.

== Episodes ==
1. Carol Burnett (aired July 2, 1967)
2. Woody Allen (aired July 9, 1967)
3. Eddie Albert (aired July 16, 1967)
4. Dick Shawn (aired July 23, 1967)
5. Nipsey Russell (aired July 30, 1967)
6. Soupy Sales (aired August 6, 1967)
7. Joel Grey (aired August 13, 1967)
8. Shelley Berman (aired August 20, 1967)
9. Cyril Ritchard (aired August 27, 1967)
10. Arthur Godfrey (aired September 3, 1967)

== Production notes ==
Executive producer of Our Place was Bob Precht, son-in-law of Ed Sullivan, who produced The Ed Sullivan Show. John Moffitt was the director. Bill Angelos and Buz Kohan wrote and produced the show.

Other guests included Ruth Buzzi and Charles Nelson Reilly.
