= The Roger Miller Show =

American TV variety show (1966)

The Roger Miller Show is an American music variety television show hosted by Roger Miller. The NBC program aired on Monday nights from 8:30–9 p.m. ET from September 12–December 26, 1966. The house band was the Eddie Karam Orchestra.

== Production ==
Gary Smith and Dwight Hemion were co-producers of the show. Hemion also directed it. Jeff Harris, Bernie Kukoff, and Mason Williams were the writers. Its competition included The Lucy Show and The Rat Patrol. It was replaced by Captain Nice. The theme song was "King of the Road". Episodes were recorded on tape in an NBC studio in California.

Sponsors included Dodge automobiles.

== Promotion ==
When a previous commitment to showing films on Monday nights left WSB-TV in Atlanta unable to carry The Roger Miller Show, an Atlanta radio station and a Nashville publishing company joined forces to try to change the situation. Teaming with Tree Publishing Company, WQXI ran "4-5 spot announcements per hour throughout the broadcast day in a contest wherein participants will contact WQXI stating 'Why I want to see Roger Miller in Atlanta.'" Winners were to travel by chartered plane to Nashville, where they would watch the Miller show at WSM-TV's facilities and meet some Nashville entertainers while they were there.

== Critical response ==
A review in The New York Times said that NBC executives had too little faith in Miller's talent, weakening the show by including guest stars (David McCallum and the Baja Marimba Band in the episode reviewed). "Predictably, the show was at its best when Mr. Miller was carrying the ball alone", the review said, "... and at its worst when Mr. McCallum and the marimba-ists appeared on the scene." The review concluded with the suggestion, "N.B.C. ought to forget about guest stars and 'production values' and give Mr. Miller a half-hour to do with what he wishes."
