= ABC Scope =

- Genre: Documentary
- Presented by: Howard K. Smith
- Country of origin: United States
- Original language: English
- No. of seasons: 4

Original release
- Network: ABC
- Release: November 11, 1964 – March 2, 1968

ABC Scope is a public affairs program that appeared on the ABC television network from November 11, 1964 to March 2, 1968, hosted by Howard K. Smith, the future anchor of the ABC Evening News. News reporters Louis Rukeyser, Frank Reynolds and John Scali also appeared. The program provided its viewer with an in-depth look at the important political, economic and social issues that the world faced in the mid-to-late 1960s. Although Smith hosted the show, the program provided its audience with one-on-one interviews of important newsmakers, documentaries on various subjects and roundtable discussions between a group of experts.

Many editions dealt with a review of the week in the Vietnam War.

Despite winning plaudits with critics, ABC Scope got little respect from its own network. Already scheduled in an impossible timeslot (Saturdays at 10:30 PM, up against the second half-hour of Gunsmoke on CBS), not one major affiliate (not even flagship station WABC-TV in New York) carried it in that time period, preferring to schedule local or syndicated programming in its place. Most affiliates aired it in "fringe time" during the weekend.
