= The Bell Telephone Hour =

Television series

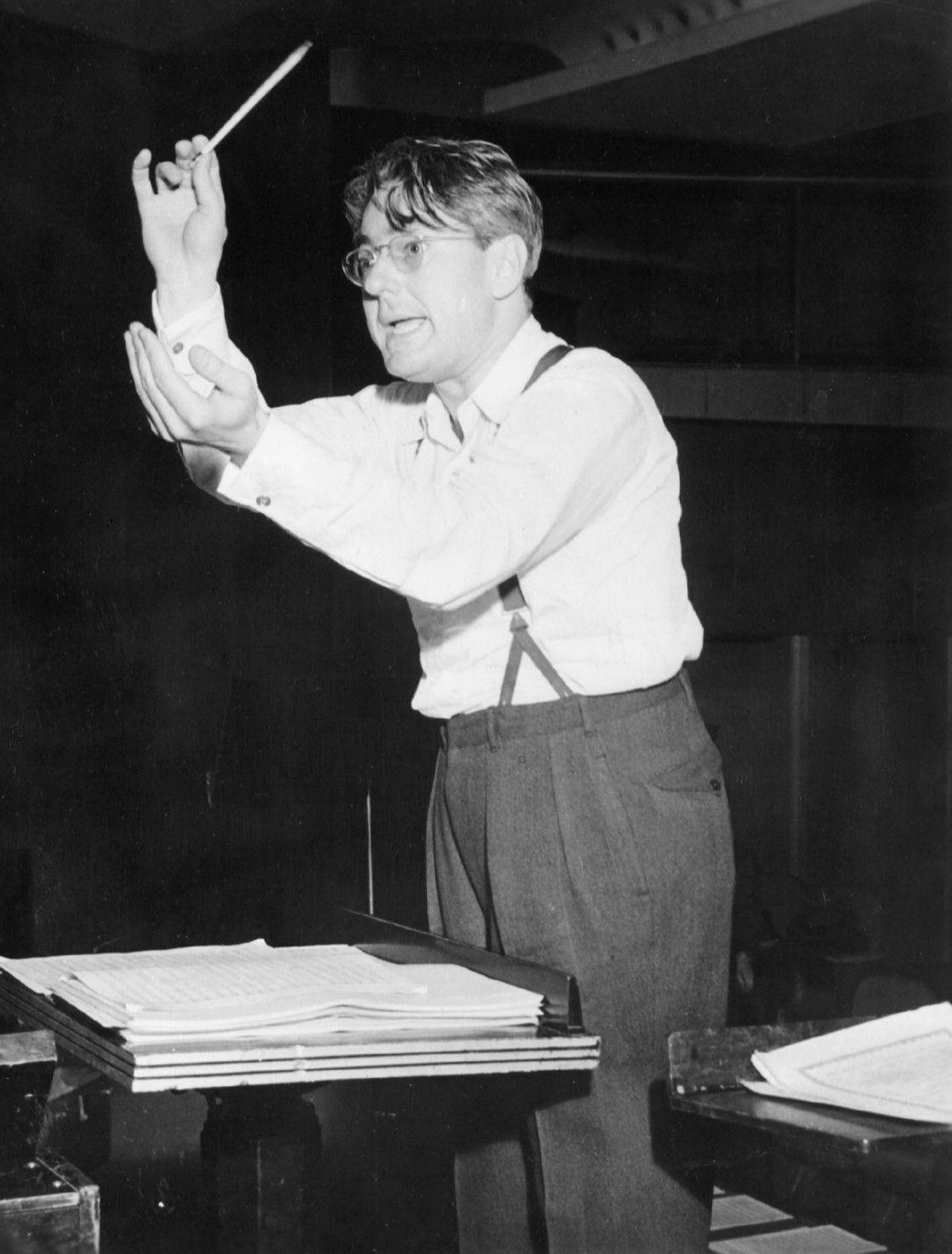
- Donald Voorhees conducting The Bell Telephone Hour on NBC Radio Network
- Genre: Classical and Broadway music
- Country of origin: United States
- Home station: NBC Radio Network (1940-1958); NBC (1959-1968)
- Starring: Donald Voorhees
- Produced by: Wallace Magill
- Original release: April 29, 1940 – June 30, 1958
- Sponsored by: Bell Telephone

The Bell Telephone Hour, also known as The Telephone Hour, was a concert series broadcast on NBC Radio Network from April 29, 1940, to June 30, 1958. Sponsored by Bell Telephone as the name implies, it showcased the best in classical and Broadway music, reaching eight to nine million listeners each week. It continued on television from 1959 to 1968. Throughout the program's run on both radio and television, the studio orchestra on the program was conducted by Donald Voorhees.

== Synopsis ==
After early shows featuring James Melton and Francia White as soloists, producer Wallace Magill restructured the format on April 27, 1942, into the "Great Artists Series" of concert and opera performers, beginning with Jascha Heifetz. The list of talents heard over the years includes Marian Anderson, Bing Crosby, Margaret Daum, Nelson Eddy, Benny Goodman, Josef Hofmann, José Iturbi, Fritz Kreisler, Gregor Piatigorsky, Oscar Levant, Ezio Pinza, Lily Pons, Gladys Swarthout, and Helen Traubel.

The series returned to radio in 1968-69 as Encores from the Bell Telephone Hour featuring highlights and interviews from the original series.

The Bell Telephone Hour Orchestra included clarinetist and saxophonist Joe Allard, who is well known as a saxophone teacher at the Juilliard School and the New England Conservatory of Music. His list of students includes Stan Getz, Eric Dolphy, Dave Liebman, Ricky Ford, Bob Hanlon, Dave Tofani, Mike Brecker, Roger Rosenberg, John Coltrane, and Steve Grossman.

Warner Anderson was the program's announcer, and Floyd Mack the narrator.

== Television ==
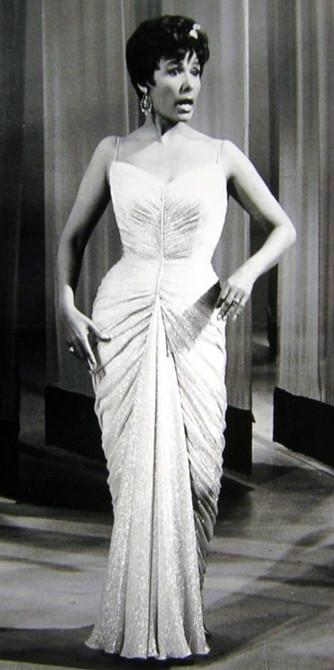
Lena Horne performing in 1964

The TV show, seen on NBC from January 12, 1959, to April 28, 1968, was one of the first TV series to be telecast exclusively in color, using the color TV system perfected by RCA in 1954. It aired every week on Friday evenings at 10:00 pm, then was switched to Tuesday evenings at 10:00 pm in 1963. It was noted for its Christmas specials, frequently featuring opera stars and stars of musical theater and ballet. In the fall of 1965, the show was switched to an earlier time, Sundays at 6:30 pm.

In 1960, the program alternated weeks with Sing Along with Mitch. Beginning in 1965, the program sometimes had to share its time slot with an NBC news series called Actuality Specials on NBC, and was telecast every other week. In the fall of 1963, the program alternated with The Andy Williams Show.

During its last season, 1967–1968, the program was switched back to its old Friday-night time slot and the format changed from a videotaped and mostly musical presentation to filmed documentaries about classical musicians made on location. By this point, The Bell Telephone Hour was seen as a relic of a bygone era in television history.

One of the most notable of the Bell Telephone Hour documentary programs combined a tour of the Museo del Prado in Madrid, with performances by such noted Spanish musicians as Andrés Segovia, Alicia de Larrocha, and Victoria de los Ángeles. Another was a profile of Cleveland Orchestra conductor George Szell. This one was not a biography of Szell, but a documentary showing how he worked with the orchestra.

One of the last, and most notable episodes done in the videotape format, was "First Ladies of Opera", featuring Joan Sutherland, Leontyne Price, Renata Tebaldi, and Birgit Nilsson, all on one program. In 1976, footage from the TV series was edited into a 90-minute retrospective TV special entitled The Bell Telephone Jubilee, hosted by Bing Crosby and Liza Minnelli.

NBC staff announcer Mel Brandt was the series announcer. ABC staff announcer Scott Vincent hosted the 1962 season finale, "Till Autumn".

== Reissues on DVD ==
Beginning in 2001, DVDs of performances from the television series have been released by Video Artists International. To date, VAI has issued more than two dozen DVD compilations, and a number of complete telecasts, most notably the episode of April 29, 1960, which presented a lavishly staged production of The Mikado starring Groucho Marx. The stunning array of performers who appeared on The Bell Telephone Hour television program includes:

• Singers: Barbara Cook, Franco Corelli, Régine Crespin, Victoria De Los Angeles, Giuseppe Di Stefano, Eileen Farrell, Nicolai Gedda, Dolores Gray, Mahalia Jackson, Carol Lawrence, George London, Thomas Hayward, Gordon MacRae, Ethel Merman, Robert Merrill, Anna Moffo, Birgit Nilsson, Roberta Peters, Leontyne Price, John Raitt, Dinah Shore, Risë Stevens, Joan Sutherland, Renata Tebaldi, Richard Tucker, Leslie Uggams, Jon Vickers, Mildred Miller and Gretchen Wyler

• Pianists: Claudio Arrau, Jorge Bolet, Robert Casadesus, Alicia de Larrocha, Van Cliburn, Philippe Entremont, Milton Kaye, Lorin Hollander, Byron Janis, Grant Johannesen, and José Iturbi

• Violinists: Mischa Elman, Zino Francescatti, Yehudi Menuhin, Erica Morini, David Oistrakh, Michael Rabin, Ruggiero Ricci, and Isaac Stern (Also, famed cellist Gregor Piatigorsky and master of the guitar Andrés Segovia)

• Dancers: Alicia Alonso, Erik Bruhn, Jacques d'Amboise, Carla Fracci, Rudolf Nureyev, Matt Mattox, Edward Villella, Violette Verdy, and Maria Tallchief

- Musical groups: Jefferson Airplane, The New Christy Minstrels

== Awards ==
The series won two Emmys and was nominated for seven others.

== Rehearsal: The Telephone Hour ==
In 1947, a 27-minute, black-and-white short subject entitled Rehearsal: The Telephone Hour, was released to theaters. Originating in NBC's Studio 6B at 30 Rockefeller Plaza, the film featured, in addition to Voorhees and the orchestra, operatic bass Ezio Pinza and opera mezzo-soprano Blanche Thebom singing arias. It simulated a rehearsal of the popular program, complete with a commercial announcement, and then, near the end, segued to what was presumably the actual radio broadcast.

== Listen to ==
- Internet Archive: The Bell Telephone Hour

== Watch ==
- Rehearsal: The Telephone Hour
