= Actuality Specials =

- Genre: Documentary
- Country of origin: United States
- Original language: English

Original release
- Network: NBC
- Release: July 16, 1962 – September 13, 1968

Actuality Specials is an American television series consisting of a collection of documentaries produced by NBC News and broadcast during the 1960s. Some of the programs were reruns that had been shown earlier; others were produced specifically for this series.

== Narrators ==
The documentaries were usually narrated by one of the NBC news anchors and included Chet Huntley, Robert MacNeil, Frank McGee and Edwin Newman. Narration was sometimes provided by Hollywood personalities such as Lorne Greene and Raymond Burr.

== Broadcast history ==
The series was originally produced as a summer series beginning in July 1962, part of an attempt to placate Federal Communications Commission chairman Newton Minow and his displeasure with the lack of quality programming at the time. It was pulled from the schedule that fall.

It returned in October 1965 and ran for three more years. During this time, it alternated broadcast with The Bell Telephone Hour.
