= Above Suspicion =

Above Suspicion may refer to:

- Above Suspicion (novel), a 1941 spy novel by Helen MacInnes
  - Above Suspicion (1943 film), starring Joan Crawford and based on the MacInnes novel
- Above Suspicion, a 1993 novel by Joe Sharkey
  - Above Suspicion (2019 film), starring Emilia Clarke and Jack Huston based on the Sharkey novel
- Above Suspicion (1995 film), starring William H. Macy and Christopher Reeve
- Above Suspicion, a 2004 novel by Lynda La Plante
  - Above Suspicion (TV series), 2009, based on the La Plante novel
- "Above Suspicion" (Law & Order: Special Victims Unit), a 2012 episode of the legal drama Law & Order: Special Victims Unit
