= Christopher Cary =

English-American film, stage and television actor

- Cary in 1968
- Born: Christopher Bay Carysfort; June 16, 1934; Surrey, England
- Died: April 1, 2000 (aged 65); Hollywood Hills, California, U.S.
- Occupations: Film, stage and television actor

Christopher Bay Carysfort (June 16, 1934 – April 1, 2000) was an English-American film, stage and television actor.

== Life and career ==
Cary was born in Surrey. He originally was a dancer, and in 1955, he moved to Los Angeles, California. He began his screen career in 1957, appearing in the NBC drama television series Robert Montgomery Presents. During his screen career, he appeared in Albert McCleery's stage play What Else Have You Got in the Closet at the Pasadena Playhouse.

Later in his career, in 1967, Cary starred as Goniff in the ABC drama television series Garrison's Gorillas, starring along with Ron Harper, Cesare Danova, Brendon Boone and Rudy Solari. After the series ended in 1968, he guest-starred in television programs including The Time Tunnel, The Man from U.N.C.L.E. (and its spin-off The Girl from U.N.C.L.E.), Mannix, Land of the Giants, Hawaii Five-O, The Wild Wild West, The Rockford Files and Hill Street Blues. He also appeared in films such as Raid on Rommel, The Sword and the Sorcerer, Rescue Me, Million Dollar Mystery, Missing in Action 2: The Beginning and Marlowe.

In 1995, Cary provided the voice of Watson in an episode of the Nickelodeon animated television series Aaahh!!! Real Monsters. He last narrated in the 2000 animated short film The Indescribable Nth.

== Death ==
Cary died of cancer on April 1, 2000, at his home in Hollywood Hills, California, at the age of 65.
