= The Venetian Affair =

The Venetian Affair may refer to:

- The Venetian Affair, 1963 novel by Scottish-American author Helen MacInnes
- The Venetian Affair (film), 1967 American film
