= Incident on a Dark Street =

1973 American television film by Buzz Kulik

- Title card
- Genre: Procedural drama
- Created by: E. Jack Neuman
- Written by: E. Jack Neuman
- Directed by: Buzz Kulik
- Starring: James Olson; David Canary; Robert Pine; Richard S. Castellano; William Shatner
- Music by: Elmer Bernstein
- Country of origin: United States
- Original language: English

Production
- Executive producer: David Gerber
- Producer: E. Jack Neuman
- Production location: Los Angeles
- Cinematography: Charles F. Wheeler
- Editor: Rita Roland
- Running time: 96 minutes
- Production company: 20th Century Fox Television

Original release
- Network: NBC
- Release: January 13, 1973

Incident on a Dark Street is a 1973 TV movie that premiered on NBC on January 13, 1973.

== Plot ==
Two law school grads take on their first big cases as prosecutors for the federal government as U.S. Attorney Joe Dubbs is attempting to bring down the crime boss Dominic Leopold. A corrupt city utilities commissioner promises Leopold the contract for a massive public works project in return for a huge kickback. A small-time hood is murdered just as he is about to blow the whistle on the organized crime ring and expose the scheme to defraud the city.

== Cast ==
- James Olson as Joe Dubbs
- David Canary as Peter Gallagher
- Robert Pine as Paul Hamilton Jr.
- Richard S. Castellano as Frank Romeo
- William Shatner as Deaver G. Wallace
- Murray Hamilton as Edmund Schilling
- Gilbert Roland as Dominic Leopold
- David Doyle as Luke Burgess
- James Davidson as Arthur Lloyd Trenier
- Kathleen Lloyd as Louise Trenier
- John Kerr as Gallagher (Trenier's Lawyer)
- Marlene Clark as Rose
- Jerome Thor as Abe Hirsch
- Valentin de Vargas as Ernesto De La Pina
- Susan Stafford as Monica Forbes
- Tony Giorgio as Vincent Romeo
- Jay W. MacIntosh as Court Clerk
- Marian Collier as Miss Gentry
- Jennifer Kulik as Anne
- Wesley Lau as John Pine
- Roland La Starza as "Sonny"
- Earl Eby as Judge
- Nickolas Konakas as Young Detective
- Michael W. Stokey as Teenage Boy
- Michele Nichols as Teenage Girl
- Owen Orr as Square Built Man
- Jed Allan as Ben Maddon
- Robyn Millan as Marnie Jaycox
- Don "Red" Barry as Miles Henderson
- Gordon Pinsent as Mayor Joe
- Mark Jenkins
- Eddie Quillan as Security Guard
- James A. Watson Jr. as Niles McKeon

== Production ==
The television film was produced by 20th Century Fox Television as a pilot for the proposed series The Prosecutors starring James Olson and David Canary but it was not picked up for a series.

== Reception ==
Maitland McDonagh of TV Guide gave the film 2 out of 5 stars, noting that it has "all the earmarks of a pilot for a series" but that it is "talky and slow-moving".
