= Wesley Lau =

American actor (1921–1984)

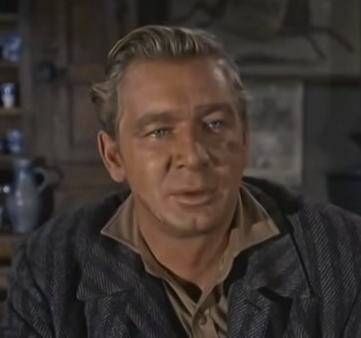
- Wesley Lau as Dave Walker in "Desert Justice" episode of Bonanza (1960)
- Born: June 18, 1921; Sheboygan, Wisconsin, U.S.
- Died: August 30, 1984 (aged 63); Los Angeles, California, U.S.
- Resting place: Forest Lawn Memorial Park, Los Angeles, California
- Education: University of Wisconsin; Yale Drama School
- Occupations: Actor, screenwriter
- Spouses: Marie Louise Metcalf; Sirin Devrim

Wesley Lau (June 18, 1921 – August 30, 1984) was an American film and television actor, and occasional screenwriter.

== Early life ==
Wesley Lau was born and raised in Sheboygan, Wisconsin. His parents were Albert and Agnes (née Feldner) Lau. He graduated from Central High School in 1939.

Lau studied playwriting at the University of Wisconsin, taking time off to serve in the United States Army Air Forces in World War II. He received a Master of Arts degree at Yale Drama School, later continuing his studies at The Actors Studio in New York. Although his goal was to be a writer, he ended up acting simply because he found more jobs as an actor than as a playwright when he arrived in New York City seeking work.

== Career ==
Lau was probably best known for playing Lt. Andy Anderson in the TV series Perry Mason. He appeared frequently during the latter part of the show's run, especially during times when longtime series regular Ray Collins, who played Lt. Arthur Tragg, was absent. Collins died in 1965 before the series ended its run. Lau first appeared on Perry Mason as defendant Amory Fallon in "The Case of the Impatient Partner" in September 1961. Less than a month later, he made the first of 81 appearances as Lt. Anderson, a role which ran from "The Case of the Malicious Mariner," the fourth episode of the fifth season (1961–1962), through "The Case of the Mischievous Doll," the last episode of the eighth season (1964–1965).

Other shows in which Lau made appearances included Alfred Hitchcock Presents, Gunsmoke, Mike Hammer, Johnny Ringo, Have Gun – Will Travel, Peter Gunn, The Twilight Zone, The Time Tunnel, The Big Valley, Mission: Impossible, Cannon, Wagon Train, and The Six Million Dollar Man. He would reunite with Raymond Burr, who played the title role in the Perry Mason series, in an episode of Ironside called "In the Forests of the Night".

He also appeared in motion pictures, including the 1960 John Wayne film The Alamo.

== Death ==
Lau died of heart failure on August 30, 1984, aged 63, and is buried at Forest Lawn-Hollywood Hills Cemetery, Los Angeles.

== Acting roles ==
=== Television series ===
- The Web, "A Time For Dying" (1953)
- Studio One, "Crime at Blossom's" (1953)
- Armstrong Circle Theatre, "Night Court" (1957), Mr. Miller
- Omnibus, "Lee at Gettysburg" (1957), Major General John B. Hood
- The Silent Service, "The Harder at Woleai" (1958), Commander Samuel D. Dealey
- Steve Canyon, "Operation Crash Landing" (1958), Sergeant Bowman
- Lawman, "The Badge" (1958), Rick Andrews
- Mickey Spillane's Mike Hammer, "Peace Bond" (1958), Johnny Conrad
- Alfred Hitchcock Presents

Season 4 Episode 11: "And the Desert Shall Blossom" (1958) as Deputy Tex
Season 4 Episode 12: "Mrs. Herman and Mrs. Fenimore" (1958) as Police Detective
Season 5 Episode 4: "Coyote Moon" (1959) as Harry

- Flight

"The Dart" (1958)
"Destination Normandy" (1958)
"Typhoon Chasers" (1958)

- Jane Wyman Presents

"He Came for the Money" (1958), Clay
"Day of Glory" (1958), Commander Von Schoss

- The DuPont Show with June Allyson, "The Girl" (1959), Joseph Dunn
- Pony Express, "The Peace Offering" (1959), Hager
- Whirlybirds, "Mr. Jinx" (1959), James
- Westinghouse Desilu Playhouse, "A Diamond for Carla" (1959), Jery Wilson
- Goodyear Theatre, "Story Without a Moral" (1959), Captain Rheinhold
- Peter Gunn

"Kill from Nowhere" (1959), Joe Scully
"The Death Frame" (1960), Eddie Carson

- Have Gun – Will Travel

"Sons of Aaron Murdock" (1959), Lew Murdock
"Saturday Night" (1960), Stub

- Gunsmoke

"Miguel's Daughter" (1959), Ab
"Young Love" (1959), Rod Allison
"The Blacksmith" (1960), Willy

- Black Saddle

"Client: Tagger" (1959), Jesse Britt
"Burden of Guilt" (1960), Trip Harris

- Alcoa Presents: One Step Beyond

"The Haunted U-Boat" (1959), Lieutenant Schneider
"The Mask" (1960), Lt. Harold Wilenski

- Michael Shayne, "Murder in Wonderland" (1960), Jerry Latimer
- The Law and Mr. Jones, "Christmas Is a Legal Holiday" (1960), Roger Forester
- The Untouchables, "Kiss of Death Girl" (1960), Whitey Barrows
- The Life and Legend of Wyatt Earp, "He's My Brother" (1960), Dave Dray
- Tales of Wells Fargo

"Leading Citizen" (1960), Morgan Bates
"The English Woman" (1960), Hank

- Shotgun Slade, "Backtrack" (1960), Jeb
- M Squad, "A Grenade for a Summer's Evening" (1960), Harry
- Law of the Plainsman, "Stella" (1960), Staff Meeker
- Johnny Ringo, "Uncertain Vengeance" (1960), Red Crale
- The Detectives Starring Robert Taylor, "The Trap" (1960), Carl Ryan
- Mr. Lucky, "The Two Million Dollar Window" (1960), Slate
- Johnny Midnight, "An Old-Fashioned Frame" (1960), Connor
- Adventures in Paradise, "Vendetta" (1961), Paul Moore
- The Tall Man, "Ladies of the Town" (1961), Jason Cleary
- Coronado 9, "But the Patient Died" (1961), Dr. David Travis
- Wagon Train, "The Christopher Hale Story" (1961), Stevens

"The Maud Frazer Story" (1961), Cavalry Soldier

- Outlaws, "The Bill Doolin Story" (1961), Sam Evans
- Shirley Temple Theatre, "Rebel Gun" (1961), Sheriff Westram*
- The Twilight Zone

"The Fugitive" (1962), Man
"Twenty Two" (1961), Airline Agent

- Perry Mason (1961–1965), Lieutenant Andy Anderson (69 episodes); S5Ep2 Amory Fallon (1 episode)
- Combat!, "Soldier of Fortune" (1965), Lieutenant Meyer
- The Big Valley, "Earthquake!" (1965), Ralph Snyder
- Bonanza

"Desert Justice" (1960), Dave Walker
"Her Brother's Keeper" (1966), Carl Armory

- The Time Tunnel

"End of the World" (1966), M/Sgt. Jiggs
"Revenge of the Gods" (1966), M/Sgt. Jiggs
"One Way to the Moon" (1966), M/Sgt. Jiggs
"Rendezvous with Yesterday" (1966), M/Sgt. Jiggs
"Chase Through Time" (1967), M/Sgt. Jiggs

- Laredo

"The Calico Kid" (1966) Jacobus Carson
"The Seventh Day" (1967) Reverend Egan Thomas

- Garrison's Gorillas, "Banker's Hours" (1967), Colonel Karl Vogel
- Run for Your Life, "A Choice of Evils" (1967), Phil Carson
- The Virginian

"Nobody Said Hello" (1966), Matt McLain
"The Gentle Tamers" (1968), Hoyt
"Vengeance Trail" (1967), Sheriff Ben Morris

- Land of the Giants, "The Creed" (1968), Policeman #1
- Walt Disney's Wonderful World of Color, "The Mystery of Edward Sims" (1968), Mr. Parker
- The Mod Squad

"Willie Poor Boy" (1969), Dr. Albee
"The Poisoned Mind" (1971), Dr. Maggio

- Longstreet, "One in the Reality Column" (1971), Defense Attorney
- Mission: Impossible

"Doomsday" (1969), Dr. Thorgen
"My Friend, My Enemy" (1970), Karl Maur
"The Field" (1971) (writer)
"Double Dead" (1972), Jim Thompson

- Cannon

"Hear No Evil" (1972), Ray Norman
"Valley of the Damned" (1973), Lieutenant Harry Wharton

- Ironside, "In the Forests of the Night" (1973), Thompkins
- Chase, "Gang War" (1973)
- The Magician

"Ovation for Murder" (1973), Captain Gottschalk
"The Illusion of the Curious Counterfeit: Part 2" (1974), Captain Gottschalk
"Shattered Image" (1974), Captain Gottschalk

- The Six Million Dollar Man, "Lost Love" (1975), Emil
- Jacqueline Susann's Valley of the Dolls (1981), Man with Dog (final film role)

=== Feature-length films ===
- I Want to Live! (1958) - Henry L. Graham
- The Alamo (1960) - Emil Sande
- The Venetian Affair (1967) - Neill Carlson
- Panic in the City (1968) - Police Lieutenant Brady
- Journey to Shiloh (1968) - Colonel Boykin
- The Sweet Ride (1968) - Gene Bronson (uncredited)
- Zabriskie Point (1970) - Company Executive (uncredited)
- Skyjacked (1972) - Stanley Morris
- Incident on a Dark Street (1973, TV Movie) - John Pine
- Lepke (1975) - First Detective (also as a writer)
