= Karen Jensen =

American actress (born 1944)

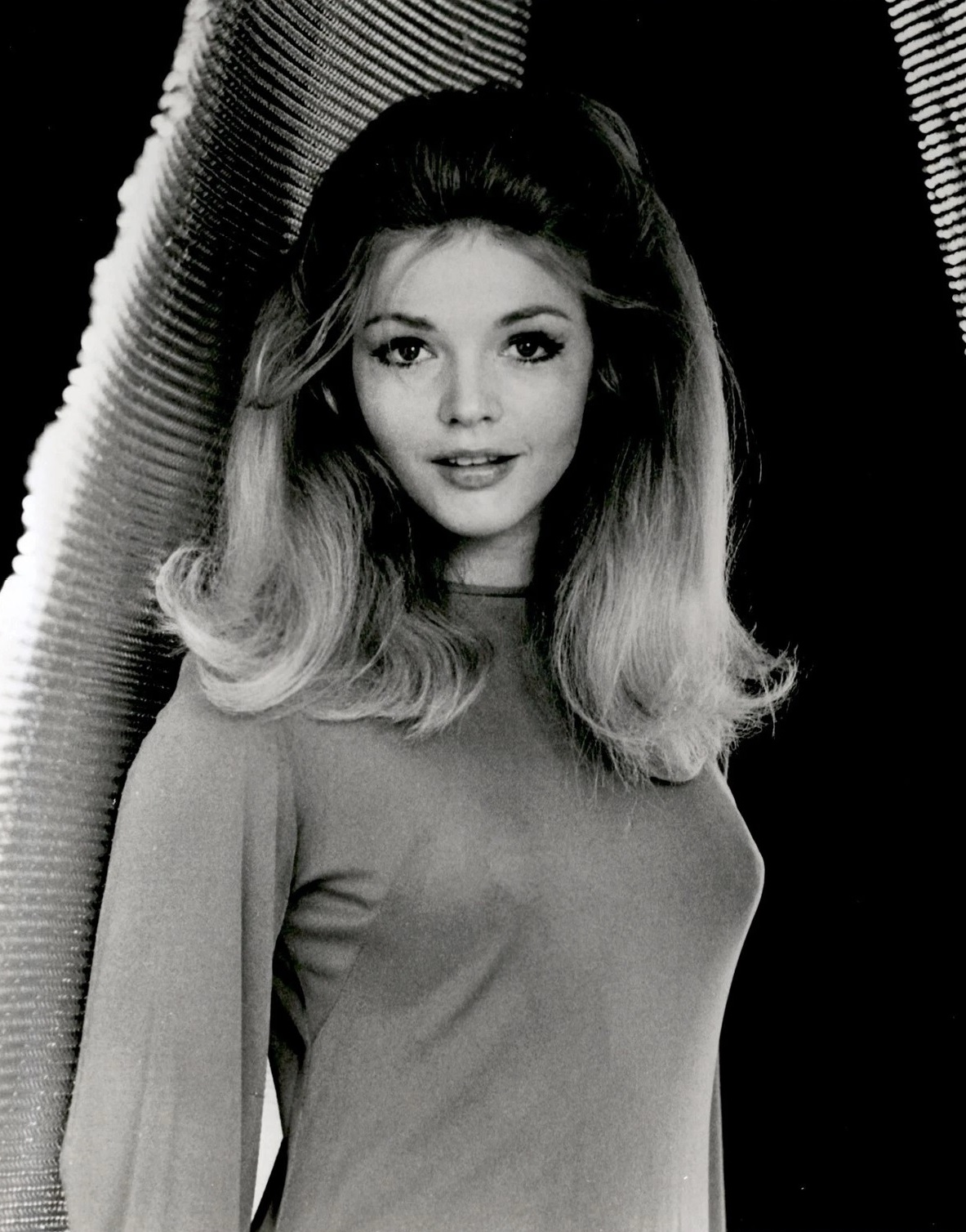
- Jensen in 1969
- Born: August 18, 1944 (age 82); San Francisco, California, U.S.
- Occupation: Actor
- Years active: 1961-1979
- Spouse(s): John Neilson (1970-1990; divorced); Michael Stroka (1990-1997; his death); Brendon Boone (m. 1999)

Karen Jensen is an American actress.

== Biography ==
Born in San Francisco, Jensen is the daughter of Charles and Claire Jensen. She was the youngest person to win the Miss San Carlos title. After she participated in other pageants, she became a model and was photographed for billboard advertising for Granny Goose Potato Chips. A William Morris Agency talent scout saw her in the Miss California pageant, and after she passed a screen test she received a Warner Bros. contract.

Jensen's acting debut came in 1965 in the television situation comedy Wendy and Me. She performed on some other TV shows before leaving Warner Bros. and going to Universal. Her film debut came in Out of Sight (1966).

Jensen was married to actor John Neilson. After their divorce, she married actor Michael Stroka in 1990. Following his death, she married actor Brendon Boone.

== Selected filmography ==
Film
Year	Title	Role	Notes
1972	The Salzburg Connection	Elissa Lang	
1967	The Ballad of Josie	Deborah Wilkes	
1966	Out of Sight	Sandra Carter	

TV
Year	Title	Role	Notes
1964	Wendy and Me	Louise	S1.E8 - "Wendy's Private Eye"
1966	The Virginian	Gloria Claiborne	S4.E29 - "A Bald-Faced Boy"
1966	Run for Your Life	Elke Southworth	S1.E21 - "Hoodlums on Wheels"
1967	Dragnet	Jeannie	S1.E5 - "The Masked Bandits"
1967	Sullivan's Empire	Doris	TV film
1967	The Wild Wild West	Catherine Kittridge	S3.E12 - "The Night of the Legion of Death"
1969	Bracken's World	Rachel Holt	series regular - 41 episodes
1969	Hollywood Squares	self - panelist	5 episodes
1969-70	The Tonight Show Starring Johnny Carson	self - guest	3 episodes
1971	Love, American Style		S2.E16 - "Love and Operation Model"
1971	The Fountain of Groovy	self	TV film/documentary
1971	Congratulations, It's a Boy	Rhonda Lewis	ABC Movie of the Week
1972	Insight	Karen Adams	S1.E347 - "Love Song of the Cuckoo Birds"
1973	I Love a Mystery	Faith	TV film
1973	Bob & Carol & Ted & Alice	Adele	S1.E4 - "I'm Not Jealous-Only Curious"
1974	Mannix	Laura Harris	S8.E12 - "A Choice of Victims"
1974	Movin' On	Myrna	S1.E1 - "The Time of His Life"
1974	Emergency!	Monique Morris	S4.E14 - "The Bash"
1974	The Snoop Sisters	Starlet	S1.E2 - "Fear Is a Free-Throw"
1976	Louis Armstrong - Chicago Style	Florence Cleveland	TV film
1979	Happy Days	Ethyl	S7.E11 - "Fonzie vs. the She-Devils"
