= Vince Howard =

American film and television actor

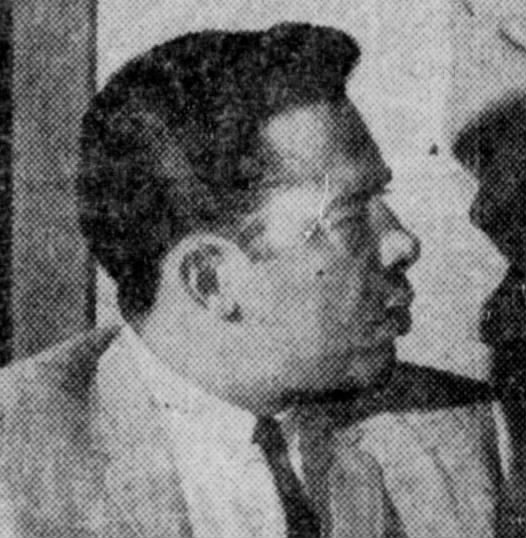
- Howard in 1964
- Born: Vince House; July 21, 1929; St. Louis, Missouri, U.S.
- Died: July 18, 2002 (aged 72)
- Occupation: Actor
- Years active: 1963–1994
- Spouse: Sara Howard
- Children: 5

Vince House (July 21, 1929 – July 18, 2002), better known as Vince Howard, was an American film and television actor. He was best known for playing Motorcycle Officer Vince in the American medical drama television series Emergency!. He also played Mr. Peter Butler in the NBC drama television series Mr. Novak.

== Early life ==
Howard was born in St. Louis, Missouri. He attended and graduated from Vashon High School. After graduating, he served in the army, and was a truck driver in Germany. He was part of the singing group, The Rhythm Aces, with Willie Davis, Billy Steward, Lloyd McGraw and Chuck Rowan, where he also changed his surname to Howard.

Howard left the Rhythm Aces, where he later joined the rock 'n roll group, Billy Ward and his Dominoes. He left the group, where he settled to move to Los Angeles, California, where he was hired to work as a technician for the Radio Corporation of America in 1958. He later performed in the nightclub The Horn at Santa Monica, California, where he was later hired for the role of the history teacher Mr. Peter Butler, where producer E. Jack Neuman saw his performance on stage.

== Career ==
Howard began his screen career in 1963, co-starring as Butler in the NBC dramatic television series, Mr. Novak. After the series ended in 1965, he guest-starred numerous television programs including The Fugitive, Kolchak: The Night Stalker, Hawaii Five-O, Cannon, The Time Tunnel, Get Smart, Bewitched, Gidget, The Monkees, Star Trek: The Original Series and I Dream of Jeannie. He has also appeared in films such as Where It's At, Lethal Weapon 3, I Love You, Alice B. Toklas, Fuzz, The Wacky Zoo of Morgan City, The Barefoot Executive, The Man and Suppose They Gave a War and Nobody Came.

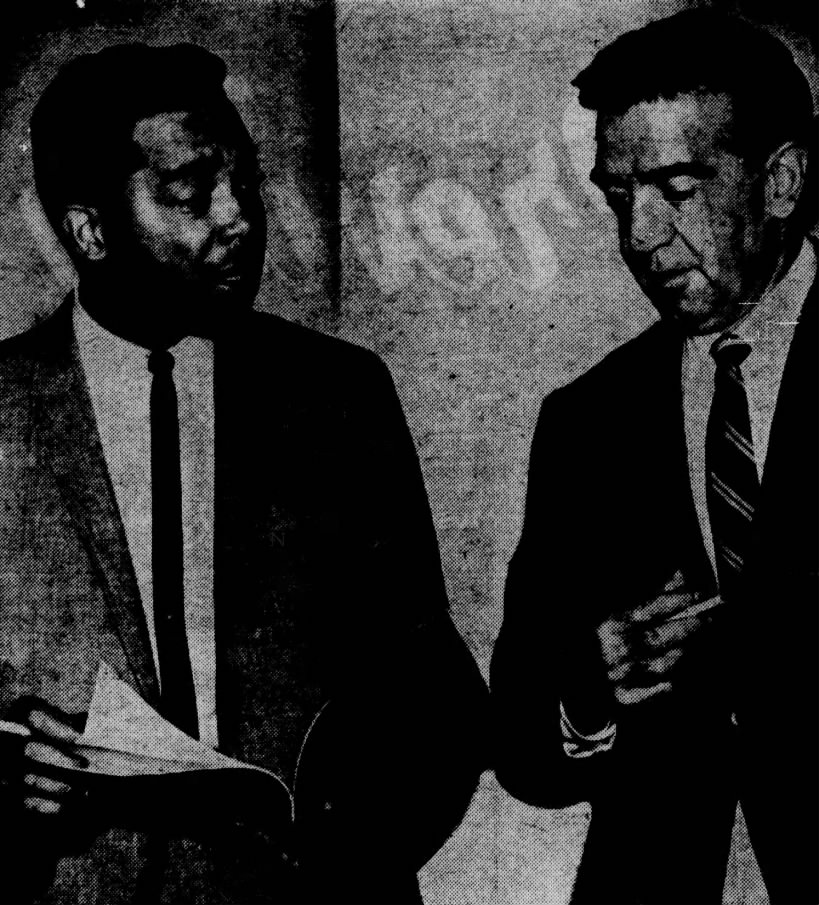
Howard (left) with E. Jack Neuman, 1964

Later in his career, Howard played recurring roles in television programs including The Smith Family (as Sgt. Ed Thomas), Barnaby Jones (as Lt. Joe Taylor), The Streets of San Francisco (as Charlie Johnson). He also co-starred in the NBC medical drama television series Emergency!, playing Motorcycle Officer Vince, mainly appearing in scenes where the Los Angeles County Fire Department squad arrives, later being an extra help to them. In 1987, he provided additional voices in the NBC animated children's television series Foofur, and played Professor D. in the animated miniseries Bigfoot and the Muscle Machines.

Howard retired from acting in 1994, last appearing in the CBS crime drama television series Murder, She Wrote.

== Death ==
Howard died of leukemia on July 18, 2002, at the age of 72.
