= The Salzburg Connection (novel) =

Spy novel by Helen Maclnnes

- First edition
- Author: Helen MacInnes
- Language: English
- Genre: Spy thriller
- Publisher: Harcourt Brace
- Publication date: 1968
- Media type: Print

The Salzburg Connection is a 1968 spy novel by the British-born writer Helen MacInnes. A British intelligence agent attempts to retrieve a box hidden in Austria containing a list of the names of Nazi collaborators left over from the war. Before long several other agencies are also after the prize.

== Reception ==
A book review in The New York Times described the novel as "a fascinating exercise in wide-screen spymanship."

The book was a commercial success. It ranked third among the top ten best-selling works of fiction in the United States for the year 1968, according to Publishers Weekly.

== Film adaptation ==
In 1972 the novel was adapted into a film of the same title directed by Lee H. Katzin and starring Barry Newman and Anna Karina.

== Bibliography ==
- Goble, Alan. The Complete Index to Literary Sources in Film. Walter de Gruyter, 1999.
