= 87th Precinct (TV series) =

- Complete Series DVD cover
- Genre: Crime drama
- Created by: Evan Hunter
- Starring: Robert Lansing; Gena Rowlands; Ron Harper; Gregory Walcott; Norman Fell
- Theme music composer: Morton Stevens
- Composer: Pete Rugolo
- Country of origin: United States
- Original language: English
- No. of seasons: 1
- No. of episodes: 30

Production
- Executive producer: Hubbell Robinson
- Producer: Winston Miller
- Cinematography: William Margulies
- Camera setup: Single-camera
- Running time: 48-50 minutes
- Production company: Hubbell Robinson Productions Revue Studios

Original release
- Network: NBC
- Release: September 25, 1961 – April 30, 1962

87th Precinct is an American crime drama starring Robert Lansing, Gena Rowlands, Ron Harper, Gregory Walcott and Norman Fell, which aired on NBC on Monday evenings during the 1961–1962 television season.

== Synopsis ==
The characters appeared in a series of novels and short stories written by Ed McBain. Lansing portrayed Detective Steve Carella, who worked in Manhattan's 87th precinct.

The 87th Precinct TV series differs from the books in that the series is explicitly set in New York. As well, the character of Roger Havilland in the books is violent, corrupt, and thoroughly disliked by the other members of the squad; for the TV series, he was transformed into an honest and respected veteran officer.

87th Precinct premiered on September 25, 1961 and ended on September 10, 1962.

== Cast ==
- Robert Lansing as Det. Steve Carella
- Norman Fell as Det. Meyer Meyer
- Gregory Walcott as Det. Roger Havilland
- Ron Harper as Det. Bert Kling

=== Recurring ===
- Gena Rowlands appeared in 4 episodes as Steve's wife Teddy Carella, and was featured in the opening credits in those episodes in which she did appear.
- Paul Genge appeared in 5 episodes as Lt. Byrnes, the detectives' immediate superior officer.
- Ruth Storey appeared in 5 episodes as Meyer's wife, Sarah Meyer.
- Dal McKennon appeared in 7 episodes as medical examiner Dr. Blaney.

== Episodes ==
No.	Title	Directed by	Written by	Original release date
1	"The Floater"	Herschel Daugherty	Teleplay by : Winston Miller; Based on a novel by : Ed McBain (Note: Though not identified by name in the credits, the novel in question was The Con Man.)	September 25, 1961
2	"Lady in Waiting"	Alan Crosland Jr.	Teleplay by : Ed McBain; Based on his novel : Killer's Wedge	October 2, 1961
3	"Lady Killer"	Dick Moder	Teleplay by : John Hawkins; Based on the novel by : Ed McBain	October 9, 1961
4	"The Modus Man"	James Wong Howe	Finlay McDermid	October 16, 1961
5	"Line of Duty"	Don Weis	Ed McBain	October 23, 1961
6	"Occupation, Citizen"	Alan Crosland Jr.	Winston Miller	October 30, 1961
7	"Killer's Payoff"	John Brahm	Teleplay by : Norman Katkov; Based on the novel by : Ed McBain	November 6, 1961
8	"The Guilt"	William D. Faralla	David Lang	November 13, 1961
9	"Empty Hours"	Sidney Lanfield	Teleplay by : Richard Collins; Based on the novel by : Ed McBain (Note: This was the on-screen credit, although "The Empty Hours" (not simply "Empty Hours") was actually a novella, and the title story of the 87th Precinct story collection The Empty Hours.)	November 20, 1961
10	"My Friend, My Enemy"	Don Weis	Anne Howard Bailey	November 27, 1961
11	"The Very Hard Sell"	Paul Stewart	Helen Nielsen from her short story	December 4, 1961
12	"Til Death"	Alan Crosland Jr.	Teleplay by : Norman Katkov; Based on the novel by : Ed McBain	December 11, 1961
13	"The Heckler"	Dick Moder	Teleplay by : Richard Collins; Based on the novel by : Ed McBain	December 18, 1961
14	"Run, Rabbit, Run"	Tay Garnett	Donn Mullally	December 25, 1961
15	"Main Event"	Herman Hoffman	William Fay	January 1, 1962
16	"Man in a Jam"	James Sheldon	Donn Mullally	January 8, 1962
17	"Give the Boys a Great Big Hand"	Don Weis	Teleplay by : Shimon Wincelberg; Based on the novel by : Ed McBain	January 15, 1962
18	"Out of Order"	Dick Moder	Jonathan Latimer	January 22, 1962
19	"The Pigeon"	Don Weis	Story by : Rik Vollaerts; Teleplay by : Rik Vollaerts & Raphael Hayes	January 29, 1962
20	"A Bullet for Katie"	Herman Hoffman	Story by : James Bloodworth; Teleplay by : Richard Collins & James Bloodworth	February 12, 1962
21	"King's Ransom"	James Sheldon	Ed McBain; Based on the novel by : Ed McBain	February 19, 1962
22	"Feel of the Trigger"	Maurice Geraghty	John Hawkins; Based on the short story by : Donald E. Westlake (Note: Westlake's short story was about his continuing series character Detective Abe Levine. For the adaptation, the central character became Meyer Meyer.)	February 26, 1962
23	"Killer's Choice"	Don Weis	Teleplay by : Luther Davis & Richard Collins; Based on the novel by : Ed McBain	March 5, 1962
24	"Square Cop"	James Sheldon	Robert Hardy Andrews	March 12, 1962
25	"Step Forward"	James Sheldon	Norman Katkov	March 26, 1962
26	"Idol in the Dust"	Don Taylor	Donn Mullally	April 2, 1962
27	"Ramon"	Maurice Geraghty	David Lang	April 9, 1962
28	"New Man in the Precinct"	Don Taylor	Teleplay by : Robert O'Brien & James Gunn; Based on a novel by : Ed McBain (Note: Though not identified by name in the credits, the novel in question was Killer's Choice. It was the second episode of the series to be adapted from this novel, but the two episodes are focused on very different plots that occurred separately (but concurrently) in the original novel.)	April 16, 1962
29	"The Last Stop"	Maurice Geraghty	Donn Mullally	April 23, 1962
30	"Girl in the Case"	Herschel Daugherty	Richard Collins	April 30, 1962

== Home media ==
Timeless Media Group released the complete series on DVD in Region 1 in August 2012.
