= The Hanged Man (1974 film) =

1974 TV film

- DVD cover for The Hanged Man
- Genre: Western
- Written by: Ken Trevey
- Directed by: Michael Caffey
- Starring: Steve Forrest; Cameron Mitchell; Sharon Acker
- Theme music composer: Richard Markowitz
- Country of origin: United States
- Original language: English

Production
- Producer: Andrew J. Fenday
- Production locations: Old Tucson - 201 S. Kinney Road, Tucson, Arizona; Mescal, Arizona; Red Rock Canyon State Park - Highway 14, Cantil, California
- Cinematography: Keith C. Smith
- Editor: Nick Archer
- Running time: 73 minutes
- Production companies: Andrew J. Fenady Productions; Bing Crosby Productions

Original release
- Network: ABC
- Release: March 13, 1974

The Hanged Man is a 1974 American Western television film directed by Michael Caffey and starring Steve Forrest, Cameron Mitchell and Sharon Acker. It premiered on ABC on March 13, 1974, and was intended as a pilot for a possible new series which was never produced.

== Plot ==
Having survived his own hanging, hired killer James Devlin turns over a new leaf, defending a widow and her son from an avaricious land baron.

== Cast ==
- Steve Forrest as James Devlin
- Dean Jagger as Josiah Lowe
- Will Geer as Nameless
- Sharon Acker as Carrie Gault
- Brendon Boone as Billy Irons
- Rafael Campos as Father Alvaro
- Barbara Luna as Soledad Villegas
- Cameron Mitchell as Lew Halleck
- Ray Teal as Judge Homer Bayne
- Bobby Eilbacher as Benjamin Gault
- William Bryant as Dr. Lawrence Nye
- Steve Marlo as Joe "Patch" Janney
- John Mitchum as Eubie Turpin
- Michael Masters as Deputy Sheriff
- Bill Catching as Executioner
- Tim Matheson as executioner's son (uncredited)
- Hank Worden as Ab Wickes

== See also ==
- List of American films of 1974
- The Hanged Man (tarot card)
