= Neither Five Nor Three =

1951 novel by Helen Maclnnes

- Author: Helen MacInnes
- Language: English
- Genre: Thriller
- Publisher: Collins (UK); Harcourt, Brace (US)
- Publication date: 1951
- Media type: Print

Neither Five Nor Three is an 1951 thriller novel by the British-American author Helen MacInnes. It takes place in New York City in 1950 during the early stages of the Cold War. It depicts the totalitarianism of Stalin-era communism as resembling the earlier Nazi threat to democracy. The title is taken from a line of poetry by the English writer Alfred Edward Housman.

== Synopsis ==
After many years away during World War II and the subsequent Allied Occupation of Germany, discharged army officer Paul Haydn returns to his former employer the cultural magazine Trend. His colleague and former fiancée Rona Metford, who broke up with him before he left to the military, is now engaged to Scott Ettley. Despite warnings of a former comrade in intelligence about infiltration of American cultural institutions by communist agents, Haydn initially dismisses it as part of the red scare. However both he and Rona begin to become suspicious of some of Ettley's associates who seem to be take their orders directly from the Soviet Union.

== Bibliography ==
- Gleason, Abbott. Totalitarianism: The Inner History of the Cold War. Oxford University Press, 1997.
- Magill, Frank Northen. Critical Survey of Mystery and Detective Fiction: Authors, Volume 3. Salem Press, 1988.
- Vegso, Roland. The Naked Communist: Cold War Modernism and the Politics of Popular Culture: Cold War Modernism and the Politics of Popular Culture. Fordham University Press, 2013.
