= Above Suspicion (novel) =

1941 novel by Helen Maclnnes

- Author: Helen MacInnes
- Language: English
- Genre: Spy thriller
- Publisher: Harrap (UK); Little, Brown (US)
- Publication date: 1941
- Media type: Print

Above Suspicion is a 1941 spy thriller novel by the British writer Helen MacInnes. Her debut novel, it was inspired by the real life experiences of MacInnes honeymooning across Europe with her husband Gilbert Highet in the 1930s. She combines a plot with amateur spies with a Buchanesque adventure in the Third Reich which illustrates the brutality and totalitarianism of the Nazi Party.

== Synopsis ==
In the summer of 1939 the Oxford University academic Richard Myles and his wife Frances are approached by an old friend and member of the British secret service to head to Continental Europe and make contact with an agent who has not been heard of for a while. While tensions are high following the March 1939 Annexation of Czechoslovakia in violation of the Munich Agreement, the couple's habit of annual holidays in the cities and mountains of Central Europe mean they will be "above suspicion".

To approach the missing agent they have to follow a chain of undercover agents working for him for security reasons. Beginning in Paris they then work their way across Germany, visiting cities such as Heidelberg, Nuremberg and Munich where they receive subtle clues about their next destination. All the time they are watched as a matter of course by the Gestapo as suspicious foreigners.

Having picked up the help of Thornley, a young Oxford student, and American journalist named Van Courtland it is in Innsbruck in the former Austria they reach what should be their destination. But at the house of the chess piece collector Doctor Mespelbrunn they find Sig von Aschenhausen, once a friendly acquaintance from their student days at Oxford now turned ruthless Nazi official. Their mission turning suddenly brutal, they make a bid to rescue the real Mespelbrunn and then escape across the Brenner Pass to Italy.

== Film adaptation ==
In 1943 it was adapted into a film of the same title by the Hollywood studio Metro-Goldwyn-Mayer. Directed by Richard Thorpe and Joan Crawford, Fred MacMurray, Conrad Veidt and Basil Rathbone. While it retained much of the plot of the book it made some changes as well, such as transforming the lead protagonists from British to Americans.

== Bibliography ==
- Buckton, Oliver. Counterfeit Spies: How World War II Intelligence Operations Shaped Cold War Spy Fiction. Rowman & Littlefield, 2024.
- Goble, Alan. The Complete Index to Literary Sources in Film. Walter de Gruyter, 1999.
- Lassner, Phyllis. Espionage and Exile: Fascism and Anti-Fascism in British Spy Fiction and Film. Edinburgh University Press, 2016.
- Magill, Frank Northen. Critical Survey of Mystery and Detective Fiction: Authors, Volume 3. Salem Press, 1988.
