= Above Suspicion (1943 film) =

1943 American spy film

- 1943 US theatrical poster
- Directed by: Richard Thorpe
- Written by: Keith Winter; Melville Baker; Patricia Coleman; Leonard Lee (uncredited)
- Based on: Above Suspicion (1941 novel) by Helen MacInnes
- Produced by: Victor Saville
- Starring: Joan Crawford; Fred MacMurray; Conrad Veidt; Basil Rathbone
- Cinematography: Robert Planck
- Edited by: George Hively
- Music by: Bronislau Kaper
- Production company: Metro-Goldwyn-Mayer
- Distributed by: Loew's Inc.
- Release date: May 1943
- Running time: 90 minutes
- Country: United States
- Language: English

Above Suspicion is a 1943 American spy thriller film directed by Richard Thorpe, and starring Joan Crawford, Fred MacMurray, Conrad Veidt, and Basil Rathbone. The screenplay was adapted from the 1941 novel Above Suspicion by Scots-American writer Helen MacInnes, which is loosely based on the experiences of MacInnes and her husband Gilbert Highet. The plot follows two newlyweds who spy on the Nazis for the British secret service during their honeymoon in Europe.

== Plot ==
In the spring of 1939 in England, Oxford University professor Richard Myles and his new bride Frances are about to spend their honeymoon in continental Europe. They are commissioned by the British secret service to find a scientist who has developed a countermeasure against a new Nazi secret weapon, a magnetic sea mine. Without knowing his name, what he looks like or where to find the scientist, the couple look upon the search as an adventure and cross Europe seeking clues from clandestine contacts.

In Paris, Frances is given a hat decorated with a rose as a signal for their first contact, who silently instructs them to go to a café in Montmartre. An unseen contact plants a tourist guidebook to southern Germany in Richard's coat. The couple notice a series of ink dots on a map in the book, which, linked together, form a musical staff with the opening notes to the song "My Love Is Like a Red, Red Rose." They deduce that this is their password. Three pinpricks in the same map direct them to the book's seller, A. Werner, in Salzburg. Werner instructs them to go to a certain museum, where a man named Count Hassert Seidel, calling himself a "guide," suggests that they check into a guesthouse run by Frau Kleist. She provides them with a book on Franz Liszt with annotations that reveal that their next stop should be the village of Pertisau in Tyrol, where they should inquire about a doctor who collects chess pieces.

Some days later, Richard and Frances attend a performance of Liszt's music. During a passage that an Englishman, Thornley, had been practicing earlier at their guesthouse, a Nazi commandant is shot and killed. Officials insist on questioning each member of the audience. Richard and Frances are rescued by Gestapo chief Count Sig von Aschenhausen, a former Oxford schoolmate of Richard's. Thornley killed the Nazi colonel as revenge for the torture and murder of his Austrian fiancée.

Frances and Richard visit the home of chess collector Dr. Mespelbrunn, and von Aschenhausen is there. They notice sheet music for "My Love Is Like a Red, Red Rose" on the piano. But when von Aschenhausen fails to respond to a code signal that Richard gives him, the couple become suspicious. They hear thumping noises upstairs and discover that von Aschenhausen is holding Mespelbrunn prisoner. Mespelbrunn tells them to run as they are being hunted by the Gestapo. Frances and Richard leave the house just in time, but go back later for Mespelbrunn, and Count Seidel arrives to help them free him. Mespelbrunn is revealed as the missing scientist, Dr. Smith. All four head for Innsbruck, and Mespelbrunn gives Richard the plans for the countermeasure.

The couple obtain counterfeit passports from the Schultzes, an elderly couple. They are planning to catch the train to Milan at separate stations, but, when the Schultzes are arrested by the Gestapo, the police are on the lookout for the Americans. Frances is detained and questioned by the Gestapo, but Thornley, in Innsbruck to catch the same train, finds Richard. Richard, Thornley and Seidel gain entry to where Frances is being held and kill her captors, including von Aschenhausen, but Thornley is also killed. After fooling the Nazi border guards, Seidel and the American newlyweds reach freedom in Italy.

== Cast ==
- Joan Crawford as Frances Myles
- Fred MacMurray as Richard Myles
- Conrad Veidt as Hassert Seidel
- Basil Rathbone as Sig von Aschenhausen
- Reginald Owen as Dr. Mespelbrunn
- Richard Ainley as Peter Galt
- Cecil Cunningham as Countess
- Ann Shoemaker as Aunt Ellen
- Sara Haden as Aunt Hattie
- Felix Bressart as Mr. A. Werner
- Bruce Lester as Thornley
- Johanna Hofer as Frau Kleist
- Lotte Palfi-Andor as Ottilie
- Lisa Golm as Frau Schultz
- Ludwig Stossel as Mr. Schultz
- Peter Lawford Oxford student

This film marked the end of Crawford's 18-year career with MGM before she signed with Warner Bros. It was Veidt's last role, as he died from a heart attack several weeks after shooting had ended.

== Reception ==
Variety wrote: "Both MacMurray and Miss Crawford completely handled their roles, despite drawbacks of script material", and T.S. in The New York Times commented, "Joan Crawford...is a very convincing heroine."

Critic Howard Barnes wrote in the New York Herald Tribune: "There are so many floral, musical and cryptographical passwords in the film's plot that the whole show becomes a sort of super treasure hunt... Unfortunately, neither Joan Crawford nor Fred MacMurray looks quite bright enough to unravel the tangled skeins of this screen melodrama."

== Home media ==
The film was released on Region 1 DVD on April 6, 2010, as part of the Warner Bros. Archive Collection.
