= Mischa Hausserman =

American actor (1941–2021)

- Born: October 31, 1941; Vienna, Austria
- Died: August 30, 2021 (aged 79)
- Other names: Michael Hausserman; Michael Haussermann
- Years active: 1965–2021

Mischa Hausserman (October 31, 1941 – August 30, 2021) was an Austrian-born American film and television actor.

Hausserman was born in Vienna, Austria on October 31, 1941. His parents are Susi Nicoletti and Ernst Häussermann. He moved to the United States in 1965, and studied acting at the Herbert Berghof Studios, before attending New York University.

He died on August 30, 2021, at the age of 79.

== Filmography ==
- 1965: DM-Killer as Young Man (uncredited)
- 1966: Twelve O'Clock High (TV Series) as German Radioman
- 1966: Torn Curtain as Idealistic Young Man (uncredited)
- 1967: Combat! (TV Series) as Johann Schiller
- 1968: Counterpoint as (uncredited)
- 1968: In Enemy Country as (uncredited)
- 1971: Ironside (TV Series) as Anton Hlinka
- 1972: The Salzburg Connection as Lev Benedescu
- 1974: Situation as Michael (as Michael Hausserman)
- 1979: Survival Run as Helicopter Pilot
- 1979: Goldengirl as Pilot
- 1983: Voyagers! (TV Series) as German Broadcaster
- 1983: Scarecrow and Mrs. King (TV Series) as Ivan
- 1984: The Evil That Men Do as Karl Haussman
- 1985: Missing in Action 2: The Beginning as Kelly
- 1986: Murphy's Law as Detective Dave Manzarek
- 1987: Assassination as Danzig
- 1995: Die Hard with a Vengeance as Mischa
- 1996: Eraser as Airplane Captain (uncredited)
- 1996: Amanda as Dr. Knudsen
- 1999: The 13th Warrior as Rethel The Archer
- 1999: The Thomas Crown Affair as Jimmy
- 2002: Rollerball as Gold Coach (final film role)
