= Congratulations, It's a Boy! =

1971 film by William A. Graham

- Written by: Stanley Z. Cherry
- Directed by: William A. Graham
- Starring: Bill Bixby; Diane Baker; Jack Albertson; Ann Sothern
- Music by: Richard Baskin; Basil Poledouris
- Country of origin: United States
- Original language: English

Production
- Producer: Aaron Spelling
- Cinematography: Arch Dalzell
- Editor: Art Seid
- Running time: 73 minutes
- Production company: Aaron Spelling Productions

Original release
- Network: ABC
- Release: September 21, 1971

Congratulations, It's a Boy! is a 1971 American made-for-television comedy film directed by William A. Graham and starring Bill Bixby and Diane Baker. It originally premiered as the ABC Movie of the Week on September 21, 1971.

== Plot ==
A swinging bachelor has to grow up after his young 16-year-old illegitimate son he did not know about shows up and wants to spend time with him.

== Cast ==
- Bill Bixby as Johnny Gaines
- Diane Baker as Edye
- Jack Albertson as Al Gaines
- Ann Sothern as Ethel Gaines
- Karen Jensen as Rhonda Lewis
- Darrell Larson as B.J.
- Tom Bosley as Herb
- Judy Strangis as Riva

== Reception ==
The Los Angeles Times called it "forgettable".
