= The Salzburg Connection =

1972 film

- Video cover
- Directed by: Lee H. Katzin
- Written by: Edward Anhalt; Oscar Millard
- Based on: The Salzburg Connection; 1968 novel by Helen MacInnes
- Produced by: Ingo Preminger
- Starring: Barry Newman; Anna Karina; Karen Jensen
- Cinematography: Wolfgang Treu
- Edited by: John Woodcock
- Music by: Bronislau Kaper
- Production company: Twentieth Century Fox
- Distributed by: Twentieth Century Fox
- Release dates: May 15, 1972 (Los Angeles-Premiere); August 30, 1972 (New York City)
- Running time: 93 minutes
- Country: United States
- Language: English
- Budget: $1.95 million

The Salzburg Connection is a 1972 American thriller film directed by Lee H. Katzin, starring Barry Newman and Anna Karina. It is based on the 1968 novel of the same title by Helen MacInnes. It was filmed in DeLuxe Color and Panavision. The sets were designed by the art director Hertha Hareiter. Extensive location shooting took place around Salzburg and at Lake Toplitz.

== Plot ==
In 1971, the British photographer Richard Bryant (Patrick Jordan) dives into a deep mountain lake, the "Finstersee", and retrieves a heavy box. Soon afterwards two local men confront him, demanding to know where he has put the chest. When Bryant refuses to answer, the younger man strikes him, causing Bryant to fall and strike his head on a rock.

The US lawyer William "Bill" Mathison (Barry Newman) is on holiday in Europe and visits Bryant's photo shop in Salzburg to ask about a book of photographs of Austrian mountain lakes. He is acting on behalf of publisher James Newhart (Whit Bissell). Bryant's Austrian wife Anna (Anna Karina) hands Bill correspondence from a certain Eric Yates, Newhart's representative in Zurich, including a countersigned cheque for the illustrated book.

During the visit, Anna's brother Johann Kronsteiner (Klaus Maria Brandauer) receives a call from Felix Zauner (Wolfgang Preiss), a family friend, who tells him that Bryant has been the victim of a fatal accident. Johann goes to identify the body at an inn close to the Finstersee. The landlord of the inn, Grell (Helmut Schmid), is the elder of the men who had earlier confronted Bryant.

Not far from the photo shop, Mathison notices that he is being followed by two men. To lose them, he takes a hackney carriage and is driven through the city. Having shaken off the first tail, a heavy set man with a moustache (Raoul Retzer) also starts to follow him. Bill takes part in a tour of Hohensalzburg Fortress, verifies that he is being followed, and then loses the man.

While admiring the view from the fortress, Bill meets the young American Elissa Lang (Karen Jensen). They strike up a conversation and Mathison invites Elissa for a drink at his Salzburg hotel. It then turns out that she works for Zauner, who is part of the Austrian secret service. Elissa also passes information to KGB agent Lev Benedescu (Mischa Hausserman) and it becomes clear that she is also working for the Russians as a double agent.

While Johann drives to the Finstersee, Bill receives a visit from Anna, who tells him of her husband's death. Anna is firmly convinced that her husband has been murdered. She therefore asks Bill whether Yates is involved in this affair, but he explains that Yates has also mysteriously died.

Anna reveals that both her murdered husband and Yates had once worked for the British secret service. But she, Anna, had never trusted Yates. She confides in Bill her belief that her husband may have once again got involved in espionage. Later, while Bill is taking Anna home, Elissa breaks into Bryant's now-closed photo shop and steals the photos taken at Finstersee, as well as his correspondence with Yates.

Bill and Anna arrive at the shop and discover that someone is inside. Elissa flees unrecognised, but is pursued by Bill. In a side alley, Elissa is confronted by a stranger, but she is able to overpower and kill him. Bill and Anna find the dead man, who Anna recognises as Bernard Dietrich, Zauner's deputy.

At Finstersee, where Johann is looking for the missing chest, he is followed by two neo-Nazis, one of whom is Anton (Udo Kier) – Richard Bryant's killer. Johann discovers the chest at the edge of the forest and is able to escape from the two men. Then he disappears and hides the box at the home of his girlfriend Trudi Seidl (Elisabeth Felchner).

Bill takes the distraught Anna to his hotel and rents a room for her there, because she would probably no longer be safe at home in the shop. At the hotel, her brother Johann visits her the following morning. He tells her that he has found and secured the box and reports that an Israeli had come to see him and offered to buy Bryant's chest. Obviously, its contents must be valuable.

Anna reminds her brother that Bryant and Dietrich had to die because of this chest and that it would be better to give it to the neo-Nazi Grell, or to destroy it. That same day, Bill meets up with CIA agent Chuck (Joe Maross), who has contacted him through Newhart. On the way to their meeting, Mathison is again followed the moustachioed man, who Chuck arranges to be shot on a chair lift by an assassin (Bert Fortell). According to Chuck, the dead man had been a Polish spy working for the Chinese. Chuck explains to Bill that the CIA had been working with Yates, who had been another double agent.

It gradually emerges that the mysterious box contains documents listing former Nazis who are still active, and who have infiltrated the West or are being used by Western intelligence services. The Russians have recently discovered a similar chest in Czechoslovakia, and have the lists already.

Bill cannot understand why the CIA is so desperate to acquire the documents, and Chuck explains that several Germans named in these lists are working in important scientific positions for the USA. They are now vulnerable to blackmail by the Soviets, and it is vital that the CIA knows their identities.

In the afternoon of the same day, Johann returns home, where the two neo-Nazis he encountered at the lake are waiting for him. They overpower and kidnap him. At the photo shop, Anna receives a phone call from Trudi, who tells her that Johann has not kept a date with her.

Bill drives Anna to her husband's funeral and waits at the entrance to the cemetery. Two men grab Anna and drag her into a car, which quickly leaves the scene. Bill notices and follows the car towards the city. He is able to get in front of the kidnapper's vehicle, slowing it down and causing enough traffic chaos to ensure that the Austrian police become involved. Anna is rescued and the men are arrested.

Meanwhile, the neo-Nazis begin to torture Johann. They want to know where he hid the chest. Elissa meets with the Soviet agent Benedescu, who is annoyed that she has so far failed to remove Bill from the scene. Benedescu hands Elissa a bomb with a 10-minute timer. As soon as she verifies that the chest is genuine, she is to use it to destroy the box once and for all. The Russians do not want anyone else to access the lists.

Anna and Bill, who are worried about Johann, want to meet Trudi in the evening, but see Zauner's vehicle on the road. They find him in his shop and he tells them how to find Trudi.

Then Elissa suddenly appears on the scene. Bill instinctively senses danger and takes Anna out of the shop. Zauner knows that Elissa is responsible for the death of his colleague Dietrich and makes it clear to her that the Austrian secret service knows about her double agent activity. Elissa assures Zauner that she only wants to destroy the chest, which seems to suit him.

Elissa goes to the inn where she meets a group of neo-Nazis, led by Grell, and makes it clear to them that she is also desperate to get her hands on Johann in order to find out the location of the chest. Grell then makes a brief phone call to Johann's kidnapper Anton.

Elissa pretends to be Anna on the phone and tries to convince Johann, who is already worn down, to hand over the chest, otherwise Trudi's life will be in serious danger. Johann passes on the location of the box, but also manages to reveal where he is being held.

At the same time, Chuck shows up in Bill's car and all three go to see Trudi. Trudi hands over the coveted chest. They are about to leave when Elissa and the Neo-Nazis arrive, closely followed by Felix Zauner. Zauner and Mathison interrogate Grell, whose henchmen have mysteriously disappeared, while Elissa attaches her bomb to the chest unnoticed. The explosion comes sooner than expected (as planned by Benedescu) and kills Elissa.

Chuck takes Grell into custody and Zauner tells Bill that he knows where Johann is being held. On the way there, Bill confesses that he and Chuck had swapped the chest for a duplicate. Zauner, in turn, makes it clear why he was so personally interested in getting his hands on the Finstersee find: his name is on one of the lists! He had once served as a Nazi informant to save his wife from deportation to a concentration camp during the Second World War, and the KGB had been blackmailing him. This was why he agreed to help Elissa.

Arriving at the hiding place, Zauner tries to negotiate a deal to take Johann without bloodshed, but Anton shoots him dead. At gunpoint, Bill disarms the neo-Nazis and rescues Johann. Soon after, Bill and Anna leave Salzburg together, driving Zauner's Porsche.

== Cast ==
- Barry Newman as Bill Mathison
- Anna Karina as Anna Bryant
- Klaus Maria Brandauer as Johann Kronsteiner
- Karen Jensen as Elissa Lang
- Joe Maross as Chuck
- Wolfgang Preiss as Felix Zauner
- Helmut Schmid as Grell
- Udo Kier as Anton
- Mischa Hausserman as Lev Benedescu
- Whit Bissell as Newhart
- Raoul Retzer as Large Man
- Elisabeth Felchner as Trudi Seidl
- Bert Fortell as Rugged Man
- Adolf Beinl as Anton's Companion
- Patrick Jordan as Richard Bryant
- Eduard Linkers as Tour Guide
- Christine Buchegger as Waitress
- Johannes Buzalski as Telephone Technician

== Reception ==
Roger Greenspun of The New York Times wrote "With twice too many characters and three times too much plot, the Oscar Millard screenplay of 'The Salzburg Connection' might have defeated the best of directors. Against Lee H. Katzin ('Le Mans,' 'Heaven With a Gun') it isn't even a contest." Arthur D. Murphy of Variety described the film as "erratically limp" as "[t]he action plods through some beautiful scenery," adding, "The score sounds like a mish-mash of badly-selected transcription library stock themes." Gene Siskel of the Chicago Tribune gave the film half of one star out of four, calling it "a lethargic and completely confusing spy story" that amounted to little more than "90 minutes of 'box, box, what's in the box?' This, of course, isn't revealed until the final minutes, at which point there is nothing that could be in the box which would save the movie." Charles Champlin of the Los Angeles Times called it "the worst motion picture I've seen all year...The least comprehensible, the least involving, the least interesting, the least entertaining, the least well-conceived, the least successful at bringing off what it set out to bring off." Gary Arnold of The Washington Post declared it "one of the least exciting espionage thrillers I've ever laid eyes on," adding "As the movie wends its unsuspenseful, uncharismatic, confusing-to-boring way, you hear the audience squirm and feel its spirits sag." Clyde Jeavons of The Monthly Film Bulletin wrote "Full advantage is taken of the picturesque Salzburg locations...But nothing can redeem the indecipherable storyline and ham-handed direction (which includes gross misuse of slow-motion and freeze); and even the most indulgent aficionado of the spy genre will find this example hard to take."
