= Mr. Novak =

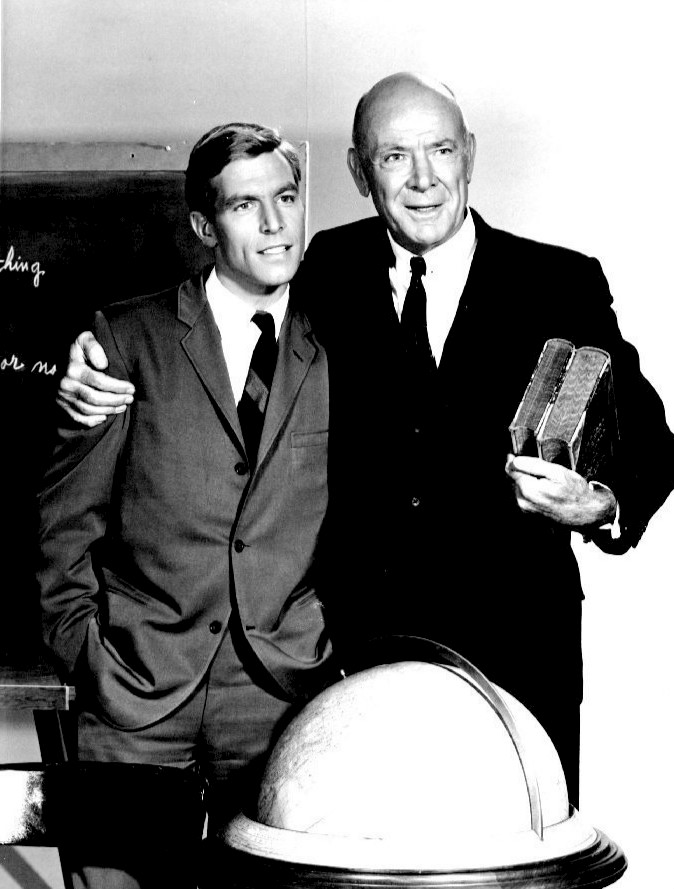
- James Franciscus as Mr. Novak and Dean Jagger as Principal Albert Vane
- Genre: Drama
- Created by: E. Jack Neuman
- Starring: James Franciscus; Dean Jagger; Burgess Meredith
- Opening theme: Lyn Murray
- Composer: Leith Stevens
- Country of origin: United States
- Original language: English
- No. of seasons: 2
- No. of episodes: 60

Production
- Executive producer: E. Jack Neuman
- Producer: Joseph Calvelli
- Running time: 48 mins.
- Production company: MGM Television

Original release
- Network: NBC
- Release: September 24, 1963 – April 27, 1965

Mr. Novak is an American television drama television series starring James Franciscus in the title role as a high-school teacher. The series aired on NBC for two seasons, from 1963 to 1965. It won a Peabody Award in 1963.

== Synopsis ==
The series follows John Novak, an idealistic first-year English teacher at Jefferson High School in Los Angeles, who often gets involved in the lives of his students and fellow teachers. Principal Albert Vane was played by Oscar-winning film actor Dean Jagger; he was nominated for an Emmy Award in 1964 and 1965 for his performances. Jagger left the series in 1964 after 44 episodes, and the show explained that his character was elected California Superintendent of Public Instruction; Burgess Meredith played the new principal, Martin Woodridge, for the remaining 17 episodes.

Jeanne Bal portrayed Assistant Vice Principal Jean Pagano during the 1963–64 season. Initially, plans called for increasing her role for the 1964–65 season, promoting her to second billing on the show, but the producer instead cut the number of episodes in which she was to appear and she left the program.

The series showcased many popular actors of the time, including Martin Landau, Walter Koenig, Beau Bridges, Tony Dow, Ed Asner, June Lockhart, and Sherry Jackson. This trendsetting show was the first to depict both teachers and students in a dramatic and realistic manner and was very influential on the educational community. Many cutting-edge themes were showcased, including racial discrimination, cheating on examinations, antisemitism, alcoholism, dropouts, drug abuse, and political extremism. In its two-year run, the program won over 47 awards from various educational institutions, including the National Education Association, and was the recipient of a prestigious Peabody Award for excellence.

== Cast ==
- James Franciscus as John Novak
- Dean Jagger as Albert Vane (episodes 1-51)
- Burgess Meredith as Principal Martin Woodridge (episodes 52–60)

=== Recurring ===
- Vince Howard as Mr. Peter Butler
- Marian Collier as Marilyn Scott
- Jeanne Bal as Jean Pagano
- Andre Philippe as Mr. Everett Johns
- Kathleen Ellis as Ann Floyd
- Larry Thor as Jim Hendricks
- Phyllis Avery as Ruth Wilkinson
- Stephen Roberts as Mr. Stan Peeples
- Steve Franken as Jerry Allen
- Charles Briles as Ken
- Bill Zuckert as Mr. Arthur Bradwell
- Marion Ross as Miss Bromfield
- Ann Loos as Mrs. Danfield
- David Saber as Toby

=== Guest stars ===
- Claude Akins, as Lou Myerson in "One Monday Afternoon" (1964)
- Eddie Albert, as Charlie O'Rourke in "Visions of Sugar Plums" (1964)
- Frank Albertson, as Jim O'Neal in "The Death of a Teacher" (1964)
- Edward Andrews, in "The Song of Songs" (1964)
- Tige Andrews, as Lt. Charles Green in "A Single Isolated Incident" (1963)
- Ed Asner, twice as Harmon Stern and Paul Berg
- Frankie Avalon, as David Muller in "A Thousand Voices" (1963)
- Phyllis Avery, three episodes as Mrs. Ruth Wilkinson
- Diane Baker, as Mrs. Chase in "A Feeling for Friday" (1963)
- Jeanne Bal, two episodes as assistant vice-principal Jean Pagano
- Don "Red" Barry, as Anthony Gallo in "First Year, First Day" (series premiere, 1963)
- Toni Basil as Randy in "One Way to Say Goodbye" (1964)
- Herschel Bernardi, as Mr. Otis in "I Don't Even Live Here" (1963)
- Tony Bill, as Chris Herrod in "An Elephant Is Like a Tree" (1965)
- Whit Bissell, as Karl Bellini in "May Day, May Day" (1965)
- Shirley Bonne, as Susan Hotchkiss in "Sparrow on the Wire" (1964)
- Clive Clerk, as Monty in "Sparrow on the Wire" (1964)
- Peter Breck, as Dr. Ted Dietrich in "A Feeling for Friday" (1963)
- Beau Bridges, three episodes, 1963–1965
- Geraldine Brooks, as Claire Andreas in "Love Among the Grown-Ups" (1964)
- Brooke Bundy, three episodes in different roles, including as Patrice Morgan in "X Is the Unknown Factor" (1963)
- Macdonald Carey, as Mr. Edwards in "Pay the Two Dollars" (1963)
- Virginia Christine, as Mrs. Payne in "The Exile" (1964)
- Jeanne Cooper, as Louise Sargent in "The Boy Without a Country" (1963)
- Noreen Corcoran, as Cathy Williams in "Fair The Well" (1964)
- Johnny Crawford, two episodes, as JoJo Rizzo in "Let's Dig a Little Grammar" (1964) and as a delegate from the Soviet Union in "The Tender Twigs" (1965)
- Robert L. Crawford Jr., brother of Johnny Crawford, as a Cuban delegate in "The Tender Twigs" (1965)
- Pat Crowley, as Ariel Wilder in "Love in the Wrong Decision" (1963)
- Robert Culp, as Frank Menlo in "The Tender Twigs" (1965)
- Royal Dano, as Mr. Metcalfe in "To Break a Camel's Back" (1963)
- Kim Darby, two episodes, one as Judy Wheeler (1965)
- Bobby Diamond, as Gus in "Visions of Sugar Plums" (1964)
- Micky Dolenz, as Ed in "Born of Kings and Angels" (1964)
- Tony Dow was cast five times from 1963 to 1965, three as George.
- Howard Duff, as Joe Stillman in "Mountains to Climb" (1965)
- Leo Durocher, as himself in "Boy Under Glass" (1964)
- Ross Elliott, two episodes (1963–1964)
- Richard Eyer, as Jeff in "Day in the Year" (1964)
- Shelley Fabares, two episodes as Dani Cooper (1964–1965)
- Norman Fell, as Barney Sanders in "And Then I Wrote ..." (1965)
- Frank Ferguson, as Stanley Novak in "Moonlighting" (1964)
- James Flavin, as Fire Chief Hawkins in "Beyond a Reasonable Doubt" (1964)
- Steven Franken, twice as Jerry Allen (1963)
- Bonnie Franklin, as Sally in "How Does Your Garden Grow?" and in "The People Doll: You Wind It Up, and It Makes Mistakes" (both 1964)
- Arthur Franz, two episodes as Det. Sgt. Sol Moss (1964)
- Teri Garr, as Lisa in "How Does Your Garden Grow?" (1964)
- Kathy Garver, in "Sparrow on the Wire" (1964)
- Lillian Gish, as Maude Phipps in "Hello, Miss Phipps" (1963)
- Don Grady, as Joey Carter (1964) and as Hank Nelby in "Once a Clown" (1965 series finale)
- Pat Harrington Jr., as Thomas Kelly in "There's a Penguin in My Garden" (1965)
- Joey Heatherton, as Holly Metcalfe in "To Break a Camel's Back" (1963)
- Peter Helm appeared three times, including the lead guest-star role in "The Private Life of Douglas Morgan Jr." (1964)
- Cheryl Holdridge, as Betty in "The Private Life of Douglas Morgan Jr." (1964)
- Celeste Holm, as Rose Herrod in "An Elephant Is Like a Tree" (1965)
- Sherry Jackson, as Cathy Ferguson in "The Risk" (1963)
- Arch Johnson, two episodes, once as Coach Brewer (1964)
- Zalman King in "An Elephant Is Like a Tree (1965) as Troubled Youth
- Tommy Kirk, as Tod Seaton in "Love in the Wrong Season" (1963)
- Walter Koenig Appeared in Three Episodes
- Diane Ladd, as Mrs. Otis in "I Don't Really Live Here" (1963)
- Martin Landau, two episodes as Victor Rand (1963) and as Robert Coolidge in "Enter a Strange Animal" (1965)
- Cloris Leachman, as Dorothy Hummer in the two-part episode "Faculty Follies" (1965)
- Harvey Lembeck, as Vic Rizzo in "Let's Dig a Little Grammar" (1964)
- Peggy Lipton, as Selma in "And Then I Wrote ..." (1965)
- June Lockhart, as Mrs. Nelby, mother of the Don Grady character, in "Once a Clown" (1965)
- Robert Logan, as Jerry Hendricks in "Johnny Ride the Pony: One, Two, Three" (1964)
- Claudine Longet, as Sharhri Javid in "The Silent Dissauders" (1965)
- Frank Maxwell, two episodes (1964–1965)
- Kevin McCarthy, as Mr. Williams in "Fair the Well" (1964)
- Tim McIntire, two episodes (1963–1964)
- Vera Miles, as Sister Gervaise in "There's a Penguin in My Garden" (1965)
- Patricia Morrow, four episodes as different characters
- Edward Mulhare, as Rand Hardy in "He Who Can Does" (1963)
- Lois Nettleton, as Jean Corcoran in "Where Is There to Go, Billie, But Up?" (1965)
- Simon Oakland, as Carl Green in "With a Hammer in His Hand, Lord, Lord!" (1964)
- Nehemiah Persoff, as Henry Selkirk in "Enter a Strange Animal" (1965)
- Michael J. Pollard, as Go-Go Reader in "Honor--and All That" (1965)
- Denver Pyle, as Brill in "Johnny Ride the Pony: One, Two, Three" (1964)
- Robert Random, three episodes (1964–1965)
- Tommy Rettig, as Frank in "The Firebrand" (1965)
- Katharine Ross, as Mrs. Bellway in "Faculty Follies, Part II" (1965)
- Marion Ross, as Nurse Bromfield in "Fair the Well" (1964)
- Tommy Sands, two episodes (1964–1965)
- Brenda Scott, as Sue Johnson in "Fear Is a Handful of Dust"(1964)
- Alexander Scourby, two episodes (1963–1964)
- Frank Silvera, as Andy Towner in "Boy Under Glass" (1964)
- Mark Slade, three episodes (1964–1965)
- Julie Sommars, as Ellen Cable in "The Firebrand" (1965)
- Tisha Sterling, as Myra in "The Firebrand" (1965)
- Harold J. Stone as Joe Garvin in "Beat the Plowshares, Edge the Sword" (1965)
- Maxine Stuart, as Angie (1963) and Miss Gardner (1964)
- Karl Swenson, as Mr. Haskell in "Love Among the Grown-Ups" (1964)
- George Takei, as Walter in "A Feeling for Friday" (1963)
- Buck Taylor, three episodes (1964–1965)
- Malachi Throne, four episodes (1964–1965)
- Joan Tompkins, as Mrs. Douglas Morgan Sr., in "The Private Life of Douglas Morgan Jr." (1964)
- Harry Townes, two episodes, including the role of Frank Dever in "The Death of a Teacher" (1964)
- Lurene Tuttle, as Mrs. Grange in "The Risk" (1963)
- Susan Tyrrell, in her first acting role as Phyllis Freuchen in "Beyond a Reasonable Doubt" (1964)
- Joyce Van Patten, as Avis Brown in "From the Brow of Zeus" (1965)
- June Vincent, as Mrs. Wilder in "Love in the Wrong Season" (1963)
- Beverly Washburn, two episodes (1964–1965)
- Michael Winkelman, three episodes (1963)

== Episodes ==
=== Season 1: 1963–64 ===
No. overall	No. in season	Title	Directed by	Written by	Original release date
1	1	"First Year, First Day"	Boris Sagal	E. Jack Neuman Boris Sagal Joseph Stafano	September 24, 1963
2	2	"To Lodge and Dislodge"	Boris Sagal	E. Jack Neuman Boris Sagal	October 1, 1963
3	3	"I Don't Even Live Here"	Abner Biberman	E. Jack Neuman Boris Sagal Milt Rosen	October 8, 1963
4	4	"X is the Known Factor"	Richard Donner	E. Jack Neuman Boris Sagal Preston Wood	October 15, 1963
5	5	"A Single, Isolated Incident"	Abner Biberman	E. Jack Neuman	October 22, 1963
6	6	"The Risk"	Michael O'Herlihy	E. Jack Neuman Boris Sagal Theodore Apstein	October 29, 1963
7	7	"Hello, Miss Phipps"	Don Medford	E.Jack Neuman Boris Sagal John T. Dugan	November 5, 1963
8	8	"To Break a Camel's Back"	Michael O'Herlihy	E.Jack Neuman Boris Sagal Meyer Dolinsky	November 12, 1963
9	9	"A Feeling for Friday"	Michael O'Herlihy	E.Jack Neuman Boris Sagal	November 19, 1963
10	10	"Pay the Two Dollars"	Walter Doniger	E.Jack Neuman Boris Sagal Milt Rosen	November 26, 1963
11	11	"Love in the Wrong Seasons"	Ida Lupino	E.Jack Neuman Boris Sagal Richard De Roy	December 3, 1963
12	12	"The Boy Without a Country"	Michael O'Herlihy	E.Jack Neuman Boris Sagal Richard De Roy	December 10, 1963
13	13	"A Thousand Voices"	Richard Donner	E.Jack Neuman Boris Sagal Anthony Wilson	December 17, 1963
14	14	"My Name is Not Legion"	Bernard Girard	E.Jack Neuman Boris Sagal Robert E. Thompson	December 24, 1963
15	15	"He Who Can Does"	Irving Lerner	E.Jack Neuman Boris Sagal Roland Wopert	December 31, 1963
16	16	"Song of Songs"	David Alexander	E.Jack Neuman Boris Sagal James Menzies	January 7, 1964
17	17	"The Exile"	Michael O'Herlihy	E.Jack Neuman Boris Sagal	January 14, 1964
18	18	"Sparrow on the Wire"	Mark Rydell	E.Jack Neuman Boris Sagal James Menzies	January 21, 1964
19	19	"The Private Life of Douglas Morgan Jr."	Richard Donner	Margaret and Paul Schneider	January 28, 1964
20	20	"Death of a Teacher"	Richard Donner	E.Jack Neuman Boris Sagal	February 4, 1964
21	21	"I'm on the Outside"	Abner Biberman	E.Jack Neuman Boris Sagal Boris Ingster	February 11, 1964
22	22	"Chin Up, Mr. Novak"	Michael O'Herlihy	E.Jack Neuman Boris Sagal Joseph Calvelli	February 18, 1964
23	23	"Fear is a Handful of Dust"	Abner Biberman	E.Jack Neuman Boris Sagal Carol Sobieski	February 25, 1964
24	24	"How Does Your Garden Grow?"	Michael O'Herlihy	E.Jack Neuman Boris Sagal Joseph Calvelli	March 3, 1964
25	25	"The Tower"	Michael O'Herlihy	E.Jack Neuman Boris Sagal James Menzies	March 10, 1964
26	26	"One Way to Say Goodbye"	Richard Donner	E.Jack Neuman Boris Sagal	March 17, 1964
27	27	"Day in the Year"	Ida Lupino	E.Jack Neuman Boris Sagal Sidney Marshall	March 24, 1964
28	28	"Moment Without Armor"	Michael O'Herlihy	E.Jack Neuman Boris Sagal Margaret Armen	March 31, 1964
29	29	"Fare Thee Well"	Abner Biberman	E.Jack Neuman Boris Sagal Carol Sobieski	April 7, 1964
30	30	"The Senior Prom"	Michael O'Herlihy	E.Jack Neuman Boris Sagal Sidney Marshall	April 14, 1964

=== Season 2: 1964–65 ===
No. overall	No. in season	Title	Directed by	Written by	Original release date
31	1	"Moonlighting"	Richard Donner	Story by : John Ryan; Teleplay by : Meyer Dolinsky	September 22, 1964
32	2	"With a Hammer in His Hand, Lord, Lord!"	Allen Reisner	John D.F. Black	September 29, 1964
33	3	"Visions of Sugar Plums"	Paul Wendkos	Joseph Calvelli	October 6, 1964
34	4	"Little Girl Lost"	Paul Wendkos	Betty Ulius	October 20, 1964
35	5	"One Monday Afternoon"	Paul Wendkos	Mel Goldberg & Herman Groves	October 27, 1964
36	6	"Let's Dig a Little Grammar"	Joseph Sargent	Mel Goldberg	November 10, 1964
37	7	"The People Doll: You Wind It Up and It Makes Mistakes"	Herschel Daughterty	John D.F.Black	November 17, 1964
38	8	"Boy Under Glass"	Allen Reisner	Mel Goldberg	November 24, 1964
39	9	"Born of Kings and Angels"	Paul Wendkos	George Clayton Johnson	December 1, 1964
40	10	"A as in Anxiety"	Allen Reisner	Betty Ulius	December 8, 1964
41	11	"Johnny Ride the Pony"	Allen H. Miner	David P. Hartman	December 15, 1964
42	12	"Beyond a Reasonable Doubt"	Richard Donner	Martha Wilkerson	December 22, 1964
43	13	"Love Among the Grown-Ups"	Abner Biberman	Harold Gast	December 29, 1964
44	14	"From the Brow of Zeus"	Ron Winston	Mel Goldberg	January 5, 1965
45	15	"An Elephant is Like a Tree"	Abner Biberman	John D.F. Black	January 12, 1965
46	16	"Enter a Strange Animal"	Alvin Ganzer	Alvin Sargent	January 19, 1965
47	17	"Beat the Plowshares, Edge the Sword"	Alvin Ganzer	Gilbert Ralston	January 26, 1965
48	18	"Faculty Follies: Part 1"	Joseph Sargent	Meyer Dolinsky	February 2, 1965
49	19	"Faculty Follies: Part 2"	Joseph Sargent	Meyer Dolinsky	February 9, 1965
50	20	"The Silent Dissauders"	Allen Reisner	Betty Ulius	February 16, 1965
51	21	"Mountains to Climb"	Paul Wendkos	Story by : Roland Wolpert; Teleplay by : Roland Wolpert & John D.F. Black	February 23, 1965
52	22	"May Day, May Day"	Ida Lupino	Story by : John D.F. Black & Donald Michael Platt; Teleplay by : John D.F. Black	March 2, 1965
53	23	"Where is There to Go, Billie, But Up?"	Abner Biberman	Story by : Herman Groves & Mel Goldberg; Teleplay by : Mel Goldberg	March 9, 1965
54	24	"The Tender Twigs"	Joseph Sargent	Story by : Robert Presnell Jr. Teleplay by : Robert Presnell Jr. & Mel Goldberg	March 16, 1965
55	25	"Honor and All That"	Paul Wendkos	Jerry McNeely	March 23, 1965
56	26	"The Student Who Never Was"	Paul Wendkos	Meyer Dolinsky	March 30, 1965
57	27	"There's a Penguin in My Garden"	Alvin Ganzer	John D.F. Black	April 6, 1965
58	28	"The Firebrand"	Michael O'Herlihy	Howard Gast	April 13, 1965
59	29	"And Then I Wrote..."	Abner Biberman	Joseph Calvelli	April 20, 1965
60	30	"Once a Clown"	Abner Biberman	Mel Goldberg	April 27, 1965

== Production ==
The series was created by producer/writer E. Jack Neuman and director Boris Sagal and featured top directors such as Richard Donner.

In his autobiography, Franciscus' Yale classmate, Dick Cavett, opined that Franciscus needed a stunt man for any scenes at the classroom blackboard due to a reputation for atrocious spelling.

=== Set ===
The school seen in Mr. Novak duplicated Los Angeles's John Marshall High School "complete to walks, shrubs, and parking." After using the school itself for the pilot, the duplicate was built at the Metro-Goldwyn-Mayer studios, the "largest permanent set to be constructed [there] in a number of years." The complete set filled an acre at the studio. Other construction on the MGM sound stages included duplicates of corridors and classrooms. Exteriors for the fictional Jefferson High School were filmed at both John Marshall High School and Hamilton High School near Culver City.

== Home media ==
The Warner Archive Collection released Season 1 of the series on DVD on November 6, 2018. Prints were made from the original 35mm camera negatives.

A soundtrack music album was released on MGM Records (E/SE-4222) in 1964, under the direction of Nick Venet.

== Book release ==
Mr. Novak: An Acclaimed Television Series, by Chuck Harter, was published by bearmanormedia.com in October 2017 and is a comprehensive examination of the show.
