= The Big Game (1973 film) =

- Directed by: Robert Day
- Written by: Ralph Anders (novel); Rick Trader Witcombe; Stanley Norman; Robert Day
- Produced by: Rudolph Andreas; Stanley Norman
- Starring: Stephen Boyd; France Nuyen; Ray Milland
- Cinematography: Mario Fioretti
- Edited by: Frederick Wilson
- Music by: Francesco De Masi
- Production companies: Atlantic Film Productions; Comet Film
- Distributed by: Comet Pictures
- Release date: 2 April 1973
- Running time: 95 minutes
- Countries: South Africa; Italy; Hong Kong; United States
- Language: English

The Big Game is a 1973 action film directed by Robert Day and starring Stephen Boyd, France Nuyen and Ray Milland. It was shot on location in Cape Town, Rome and Hong Kong. It is also known by the alternative title of Control Factor.

== Synopsis ==
Seeking a way to promote world peace, a wealthy American develops a machine that can control people's minds, and hires two mercenaries to protect it on a ship travelling to Australia where they confront assault by hostile agents.

== Cast ==
- Stephen Boyd as Leyton van Dyk
- France Nuyen as Atanga
- Ray Milland as Prof. Pete Handley
- Cameron Mitchell as Bruno Carstens
- Brendon Boone as Jim Handley
- Michael Kirner as Mark Handley
- John Van Dreelen as Lee
- John Stacy as Gen. Bill Stryker
- George Wang as Wong
- Marié du Toit as Lucie Handley
- Ian Yule as Task Force Leader
- Bill Brewer as Ship's Captain
- Romano Puppo as Alberto
- Larry McEvoy as Dr. Warden
- Anthony Dawson as Burton
- Roger Dwyer as Skipper

== Bibliography ==
- James McKay. Ray Milland: The Films, 1929-1984. McFarland, 2020.
