= Ron Harper (actor) =

American actor (1933–2024)

- Harper in 87th Precinct, 1962
- Born: January 12, 1933; Turtle Creek, Pennsylvania, U.S.
- Died: March 21, 2024 (aged 91); Los Angeles, California, U.S.
- Education: Princeton University
- Occupation: Actor
- Years active: 1955–2015
- Spouse(s): Sally Stark (m. 1974, div.); Shirley Ruse (m. 19??, div.)
- Children: 1

Ronald Robert Harper (January 12, 1933 – March 21, 2024) was an American television and film actor.

== Life and career ==
Ronald Robert Harper was born in Turtle Creek, Pennsylvania, near Pittsburgh. After earning straight A's at Turtle Creek High School, he went to Princeton University, where he was a member of the University Players. He was offered a fellowship to study law at Harvard but chose instead to study acting under Lee Strasberg.

After serving in the U.S. Navy during the Korean War, Harper returned to New York. After several disappointments, he earned a job as Paul Newman's understudy in the Broadway play Sweet Bird of Youth in 1959. Relocating to Hollywood, his first role was in 1960 for the NBC television series Tales of Wells Fargo. Steady television guest appearances followed, including a role on NBC's series The Tall Man. In December 1960, he appeared in the episode "Duel at Parkison Town" of NBC's Laramie, and three years later in its episode "Edge of Evil". Also, in December 1960, he appeared in Wagon Train (S4, Ep12, The River Crossing).

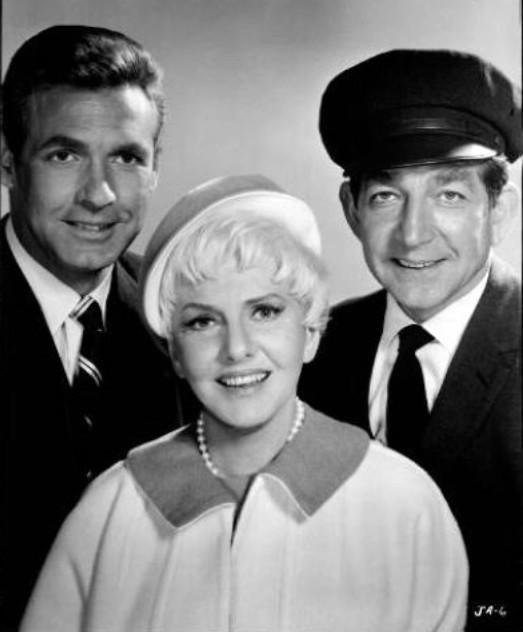
With Jean Arthur and Leonard Stone in The Jean Arthur Show (1966)

Harper appeared in soap operas, including CBS's series Where the Heart Is and Love of Life. He appeared as a regular performer for several television series, including Garrison's Gorillas, Planet of the Apes, and as Uncle Jack for the third season of Land of the Lost. His movie credits included roles in Below Utopia (1997), The Odd Couple II (1998), Freedom Strike (1998), Glass Trap (2005) and The Poughkeepsie Tapes (2007).

Harper died at his home in West Hills, Los Angeles on March 21, 2024, at the age of 91.

== Filmography ==
=== Films ===
Year	Title	Role	Director	Notes
1971	The Wild Season	Steve Blaine	Myron J. Gold	
1982	The Soldier	Head of CIA	James Glickenhaus	
1997	Below Utopia	Jack Beckett	Kurt Voss	
1998	The Odd Couple II	Jack	Howard Deutch	
1998	Freedom Strike	Norman	Jerry P. Jacobs	
2001	Pearl Harbor	Minister	Michael Bay	
2001	Venomous	Larry Kizinsky	Fred Olen Ray	Direct-to-video release
2005	Glass Trap	Henry "Hank" Conlon	Fred Olen Ray	
2005	Touched	Dr. Daniels	Timothy Scott Bogart	
2005	James Glickenhaus: Memories of the Soldier	Self		Documentary
2007	The Poughkeepsie Tapes	Mike Moakes	John Erick Dowdle	
2010	American Bandits: Frank and Jesse James	Doc	Fred Olen Ray	Direct-to-video release
2013	Whoa!	George	Tom Blomquist	
2014	Drink	Gray	Emily Moss Wilson	Short film

=== Television ===
Year	Title	Role(s)	Notes
1955	Kraft Theatre		S8E16 "Patterns"
1960	Tales of Wells Fargo	Dan Haskell	S5E6 "All That Glitters"
1960	Hollywood Christmas Lane Parade of the Stars	Self	Television special
1960	Thriller	Younger Thug	S1E12 "The Big Blackout"
1960	Wagon Train	Lt. Bevins	S4E12 "The River Crossing"
1960–1963	Laramie	Lee Parkison; Stede Rhodes	S2E12 "Duel at Parkison Town"; S4E25 "Edge of Evil"
1961	The Deputy	Jay Elston	S2E15 "Duty Bound"
1961	Shotgun Slade	Deputy Griff Blanchard	S2E19 "The Impatient Bullet"
1961	The Tall Man	Deputy Sheriff Harry	S1E20 "The Best Policy"
1961–1962	87th Precinct	Detective Bert Kling	Main role
1962	Here's Hollywood	Self	S2E125
1964–1965	Wendy and Me	Jeff Conway	Main role
1966	The Jean Arthur Show	Paul Marshall	Main role
1967	Dateline: Hollywood	Self	episode dated September 28, 1967
1967	Hollywood Squares	Self (Panelist)	5 episodes
1967	Dream Girl of '67	Self (Bachelor Judge)	Shows No. 246–250, inclusive
1967–1968	Garrison's Gorillas	Lt. Craig Garrison	Main role
1968	The Woody Woodbury Show	Self	episode dated March 15, 1968
1969	The Big Valley	Eric Abbott	S4E13 "Top of the Stairs"
1969	Celebrity Bowling Classic	Self	Television special
1970–1972	Love, American Style		S1E14 "Love and the Proposal"; S3E16 "Love and the Ski Lodge"
1971	Where the Heart Is	Steve Prescott	5 episodes
1971	Cannon	Glen Ramsay	S1E6 "Fool's Gold"
1974	Planet of the Apes	Alan Virdon	Main role
1975	The Blue Knight	Bronski	S1E3 "Odds Against Tomorrow"
1976	Bicentennial Minutes	Self (Narrator)	Episode 576
1976	Land of the Lost	Uncle Jack	13 episodes
1980	Love of Life	Dr. Andrew Marriott (credit only)	Episode 7316
1980	Another World	Taylor Halloway	23 episodes
1984	Mickey Spillane's Mike Hammer	Roger Peyton	S2E2 "Too Young to Die"
1984	Remington Steele	Dr. Roger Chandler	S3E9 "Cast in Steele"
1985–1987	Capitol	Jarrett Morgan; Baxter McCandless	8 episodes
1988	Loving	Charles Hartman	
1990	The New Dragnet	Sheldon Carr	S2E17 "Little Miss Nobody"
1990–1991	Generations	Peter Whitmore	62 episodes
1992	FBI: The Untold Stories	Arthur Lindberg	S1E18 "Operation Lemonade"
1993	Beverly Hills, 90210	Mickey Garwood	S3E19 "Back in the High Life Again"
1995	Melrose Place	Pilot	S4E10 "El Syd"
1995–1997	Night Stand with Dick Dietrick	Bob; Charles Kornhoser	S1E8 "Transvestite Wedding Show"; S2E41 "Green Dick"
1997	NightMan	Elderly Man	S1E4 "I Left My Heart"
1998	Boy Meets World	Man #1	S5E19 "Eric Hollywood"
1998	Walker, Texas Ranger	Eddie	S7E2 "Trackdown"
1999	Malibu, CA	Mr. Updyke	S1E25 "The Yacht"
2001	Two Guys, a Girl and a Pizza Place	Lawyer	S4E15 "An Eye for a Finger"
2001	The West Wing	Chairman	S2E17 "The Stackhouse Filibuster"
2008	Cold Case	Joe Bosquay '08	S6E4 "Roller Girl"
2009	Uncorked	Reverend Whitting	TV movie
2011	Recorded Live	Self	S1E3
2015	Kidnapped: The Hannah Anderson Story	Ralph	TV movie
