= Wendy and Me =

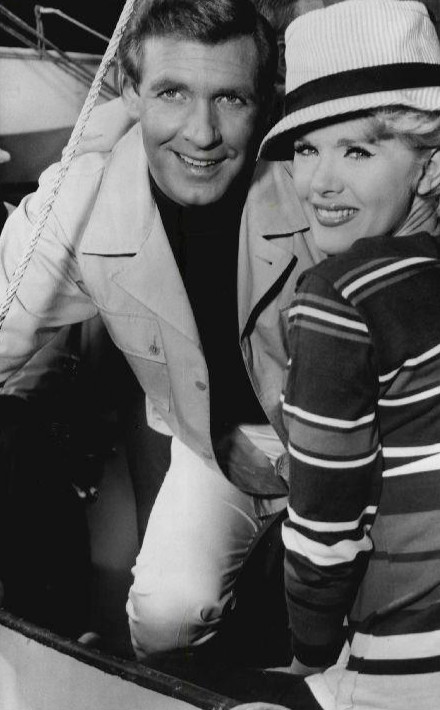
- Ron Harper and Connie Stevens as Jeff and Wendy Conway.
- Genre: Sitcom
- Written by: Norman Paul; Bob O'Brien; Elon Packard; Willy Burns
- Directed by: Richard Crenna; Gene Reynolds; Willy Burns
- Starring: George Burns; Connie Stevens; Ron Harper; James T. Callahan; J. Pat O'Malley; Bartlett Robinson
- Narrated by: George Burns
- Theme music composer: Ervin Drake
- Opening theme: "Wendy"
- Composers: George Duning; Frank Perkins; William Lava
- Country of origin: United States
- Original language: English
- No. of seasons: 1
- No. of episodes: 34

Production
- Executive producer: William T. Orr
- Producer: George Burns Gordon Bau (make-up)
- Cinematography: Louis Jennings; Jacques R. Marquette
- Camera setup: Multi-camera
- Running time: 25 minutes
- Production companies: Natwill Productions; Warner Bros. Television

Original release
- Network: ABC
- Release: September 14, 1964 – May 24, 1965

Wendy and Me is an American sitcom that aired on ABC during the 1964–65 television season, primarily sponsored by Consolidated Cigar's "El Producto". Principally starring George Burns and Connie Stevens, the series was Burns' first major work following the death of his wife and professional partner, Gracie Allen, who had died of a heart attack about a month prior to its debut.

== Synopsis ==
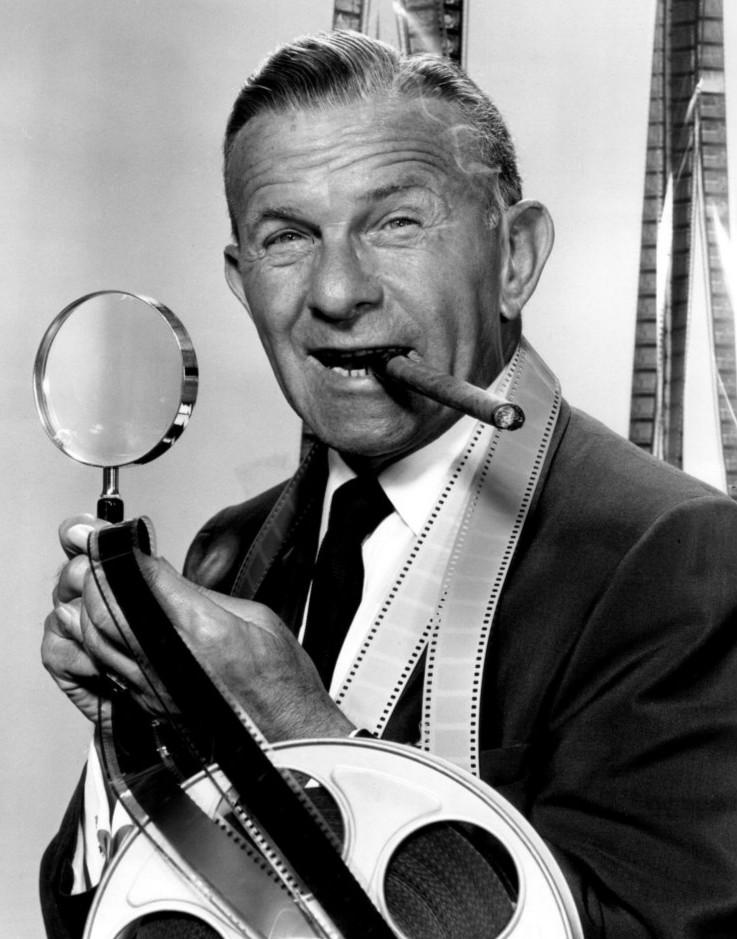
George Burns, 1961

In the series (a slight variation of The George Burns and Gracie Allen Show), Burns plays a somewhat fictionalized version of himself. He is the owner of an apartment building, while Stevens plays his tenant, Wendy Conway. Episodes typically revolved around Wendy pulling Burns into comedic situations mostly involving her husband, played by Ron Harper, and other people in the building. As a regular part of its format, Burns would often break the fourth wall to comment directly to the audience about the episode's events. Burns as landlord would watch his attractive young tenant on what appears to the modern eye to be a surreptitious closed circuit television transmission with hidden cameras (he also accomplished this with his "TV in the den" in later episodes of The Burns and Allen Show). The television was not so much a "surreptitious closed circuit television" but rather a plain old television set where George Burns watched the show "Wendy and Me" along with the television audiences (this was also the case when he watched events unfold on The Burns and Allen Show). James T. Callahan appeared in the series as Danny Adams, a playboy friend of Wendy's strait-laced husband. J. Pat O'Malley played the apartment handyman.

As part of Stevens's contract with Warner Bros., Burns agreed to produce another series for her studio, No Time for Sergeants, which appeared before Wendy and Me on ABC's Monday night schedule.

In 1978, speaking at a Dean Martin Celebrity Roast honoring her former co-star, Stevens mentioned the sitcom when she joked, "Well, it didn't last very long. I'm not blaming you, George. It was a good show, but I've had longer runs in my panty hose."

== Episodes ==
No.	Title	Original release date
1	"Molehills to Mountains"	September 14, 1964
Pilot episode.
2	"Wendy's Anniversary For...?"	September 21, 1964
3	"Swing Low, Aunt Harriet"	September 28, 1964
4	"Wendy's Secret Wedding"	October 5, 1964
5	"George Burns While Rome Fiddles"	October 12, 1964
6	"Jeff, the Senior Citizen"	October 19, 1964
7	"It Takes Two to Tangle"	October 26, 1964
8	"Wendy's Private Eye"	November 2, 1964
9	"Room at the Bottom"	November 9, 1964
10	"Danny, the Married Bachelor"	November 16, 1964
With Med Flory.
11	"Wendy, the Waitress"	November 23, 1964
12	"Belle of the Malt Shop"	November 30, 1964
13	"East Is East and West Is Wendy"	December 7, 1964
14	"Four of a Kind"	December 14, 1964
15	"Wendy, the Woman in the Gray Flannel Suit"	December 21, 1964
16	"Five Minutes to Show Time"	December 28, 1964
17	"a Bouquet for Mr. Bundy"	January 11, 1965
18	"The Wendy Mob"	January 18, 1965
19	"Who's in the Guest Room Tonight?"	January 25, 1965
20	"Wendy Sails in the Sunset"	February 1, 1965
21	"Tea Leaves for Two"	February 8, 1965
22	"Happiness Is a Thing Called Misery"	February 15, 1965
23	"Jeff Takes a Turn for the Nurse"	February 22, 1965
24	"How Not to Succeed in Stealing"	March 1, 1965
25	"Wendy Gives Uncle the Brush"	March 8, 1965
26	"Wendy Is Stranger Than Fiction"	March 22, 1965
27	"Let's Go Where the Wild Geisha Goes"	March 29, 1965
28	"You Can Fight City Hall"	April 5, 1965
29	"Wendy Lends a Helping Voice"	April 12, 1965
30	"Wendy's Instant Intellect"	April 19, 1965
31	"Danny's Double Life"	April 26, 1965
32	"Wendy's Five Thousand Dollar Chair"	May 10, 1965
33	"Call Me or I'll Call You"	May 17, 1965
34	"Tacos, Enchiladas and Wendy"	May 24, 1965
