= Brendon Boone =

American actor and writer

- Born: Norman Brendon Boone Jr. Meridian, Mississippi, U.S.
- Education: University of Southern Mississippi
- Spouses: Shirley Errington (m. 1971; div. 1980) Karen Jensen (m. 1999)
- Children: 1

Norman Brendon Boone Jr. is an American actor and writer.

== Early life and education ==
Born in Meridian, Mississippi, on 26 February 1938. Boone is the son of Rev. Norman Boone and Leola Speed Boone. His father was a pastor in the United Methodist Church. Boone was a student at Columbia High School before he graduated from the University of Southern Mississippi. He also had dramatic training at Rollins College for a year.

== Career ==
On television, Boone portrayed Chief on Garrison's Gorillas and Roman Bedford on Rawhide. He also appeared on other programs, including Gunsmoke; The Red Skelton Show; Bonanza; Gomer Pyle, U.S.M.C.; The Virginian, and other series. He also won a four-day trip to Italy on an episode of The Dating Game. Films in which he appeared include The Big Game (1972), Death Race (1973), and The Hanged Man (1974). On stage, he portrayed Tommy in Tenderloin in Oceanside, California.

Boone wrote a novel, Preacher and Co, and its accompanying screenplay, with a plot focusing on "love, brotherhood, loyalty and redemption".

Boone was nominated for a Golden Globe Award for Actor in a Television Series in 1968. He won the Hollywood Stars of Tomorrow Best Young Actor in a Television Series award for 1967–1968 for his work on Garrison's Gorillas.

== Personal life ==
Boone married Shirley Errington on May 1, 1971, in Jackson, Mississippi, and they had a son. In 1999, he married Karen Jensen.

== Filmography ==
=== Film ===
Year	Title	Role	Notes
1966	Fantastic Voyage	Military Policeman	Uncredited
1973	The Big Game	Jim Handley	

=== Television ===
Year	Title	Role	Notes
1964	The Creeping Terror	Barney the Deputy	Television film
1965	Gomer Pyle, U.S.M.C.	Sailor	3 episodes
1965	Rawhide	Roman Bedford	Episode: "Duel at Daybreak"
1966	Bonanza	Pvt. Lowell	Episode: "The Last Mission"
1966	The Virginian	Griff	Episode: "An Echo of Thunder"
1967–1968	Garrison's Gorillas	Chief	26 episodes
1969	Gunsmoke	Hawk	Episode: "Hawk"
1971	Cade's County	Kevin Wallach	Episode: "The Mustangers"
1973	Death Race	Pvt. Huffman	Television film
1974	The Hanged Man	Billy Irons	Television film
1974–1978	Emergency!	Various roles	4 episodes
1975	Switch	Police Detective	Episode: "Las Vegas Roundabout"
1977	The Hostage Heart	Dr. Charles Michaels	Television film
1978	Fantasy Island	Joe Matthews	Episode: "Charlie's Cherubs/Stalag 3"
1979	Hanging by a Thread	Marty	Television film
1980	The Night the Bridge Fell Down	Marty	Television film
1980–1982	Quincy, M.E.	Various roles	3 episodes
1981	Code Red	Police Detective Evans	Episode: "A Saved Life"
1983, 1984	Lottery!	Poker Player	2 episodes
1985	Knight Rider	Motel Clerk	Episode: "The Nineteenth Hole"
1985	Airwolf	Security Guard	Episode: "Eagles"
1986	Falcon Crest	Bill Pike	Episode: "The Cataclysm"
1986	Who Is Julia?	Reporter	Television film
1991	Jake and the Fatman	Lt. Simons / Paul	2 episodes
