= Helen MacInnes =

Scottish-American author (1907–1985), author of espionage novels

Helen Clark MacInnes
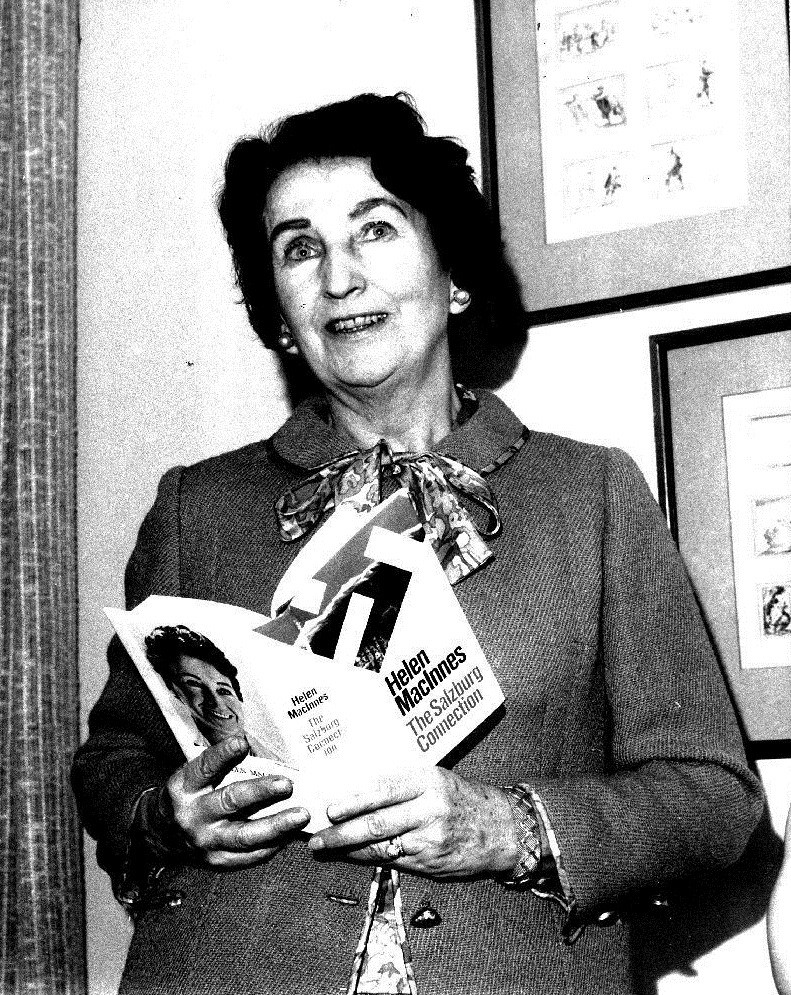
- Helen MacInnes in 1969
- Born: 7 October 1907; Glasgow, Scotland
- Died: 30 September 1985 (aged 77); New York, U.S.
- Occupation: Author

Helen Clark MacInnes (October 7, 1907 – September 30, 1985) was a Scottish-American writer of espionage novels.

== Early life and education ==
Helen Clark MacInnes was born on 7 October 1907 in Glasgow to Donald MacInnes and Jessica McDiarmid. The family lived in Helensburgh after she was five, and she attended Hermitage Academy there. Later she moved to the Glasgow High School for Girls.

MacInnes graduated from the University of Glasgow in Scotland in 1928 with an MA in French and German. She continued her studies at University College, London, where she received a diploma in librarianship in 1931.

== Personal life ==
MacInnes accepted an appointment as a special cataloguer for the Ferguson Collection at the University of Glasgow. She worked with the Dunbartonshire Education Authority to select books for county libraries. While working as a librarian, MacInnes met the classics scholar Gilbert Highet. They married on 22 September 1932.

In the same year, Gilbert Highet accepted a classics teaching appointment at St John's College, Oxford. While they were living in Oxford, MacInnes performed as an amateur actress with the Oxford University Dramatic Society and the Oxford Experimental Theatre.

The couple moved to New York City in 1937. Highet took an academic position at Columbia University in New York, while retaining a post in the British MI6 for foreign espionage.

They had one child, Keith Highet, who was born in 1933 and became an eminent international lawyer.

MacInnes became a U.S. citizen in 1952.

== Career ==
One of MacInnes’ inspirations in writing on foreign affairs and espionage was her honeymoon to the European mainland, Bavaria in particular. As she and Highet witnessed the oppression of the German totalitarian regime, she planned to write against the oppressive forces of the Nazi government, and kept notes for that purpose.

In the early 1930s, MacInnes collaborated with Highet to translate German literature, which helped finance their summer travels through Europe. These European excursions gave MacInnes exposure to locations that she used later as settings for her espionage thrillers.

Highet was a British intelligence agent in MI6 in addition to working as a classical scholar. Highet continued his work with MI6 after he and MacInnes moved to the U.S. in 1937. That year he accepted an appointment as a professor and chairman of the department of classics (Latin and Greek) at Columbia University in New York City. When the couple moved there permanently, MacInnes began her writing career. Highet's work in intelligence, in addition to MacInnes's own research and traveling, influenced her writing. MacInnes and Highet produced two books together, translations of German works.

In 1939, Highet came across MacInnes's notes and commentary on Hitler's rise to power, and other matters of contemporary politics. He encouraged her to use them as the basis for a novel.

During the following 45 years, MacInnes wrote 21 espionage thrillers, four of which were later adapted as films. Her early books were set during the Second World War, often featuring lay people who become spies or otherwise caught up in acting on behalf of the Allied war effort.

MacInnes’ first novel, Above Suspicion, was published in 1941 and remains one of her most famous works. The plot was loosely tied to her travels with Highet and his work with MI6. It follows the journey of newlywed English couple Frances and Richard Myles overseas as they are charged with going "above the suspicion" of the Nazi regime to seek out an undercover spy living in Austria to determine if his position as informant and his information is still valid. It was adapted into a film in 1943 by Metro-Goldwyn-Mayer director Richard Thorpe.

MacInnes's second novel, Assignment in Brittany (1942), was made required reading for Allied intelligence agents who were being sent to work with the French resistance against the Nazis. It was featured on the New York Times first fiction bestseller list, in 1942. Her 1944 book, The Unconquerable, was called While Still We Live in the US, the name being from the Polish national anthem, Poland Is Not Yet Lost: Jeszcze Polska nie zginęła, Kiedy my żyjemy ("Poland has not yet perished, While still we live"). It gives such an accurate portrayal of the Polish resistance that some reviewers and readers thought she was using classified information given to her by her husband.

In her later books, MacInnes shifted her subject matter from World War II to the Cold War. The Venetian Affair, for example, was published in 1963, and set in Paris and Venice; it involved Soviet agents and sleeper cells, alluded to events unfolding in Algeria and Vietnam, and contained a conspiracy to assassinate Charles de Gaulle. She continued to produce about one book every two years until her final novel Ride a Pale Horse (1984).

MacInnes was awarded the 1966 Iona University Columbia Prize for Literature.

A review in The New York Times praised MacInnes' body of work for its "unfailing eye for vivid backgrounds, her deft control of complex story lines, and her clear-cut presentation of each important member of her casts. These common qualities have given her work a kind of grandeur, a romantic overtone suggesting knights in mortal combat."

Her husband Gilbert Highet died in 1978. MacInnes died in New York City on 30 September 1985, at age 77, following a stroke she had suffered three weeks earlier.

MacInnes's writing reflects an affinity for Arthur Koestler and Rebecca West, as she strongly opposed any form of tyranny and totalitarianism.

== Works ==
- Above Suspicion (1941), made into a film of the same title
- Assignment in Brittany (1942) made into a film of the same title (though both novel and film are sometimes referred to as Cross Channel, the title of the novel in its serialized form)
- The Unconquerable (1944), also called While Still We Live
- Horizon (1945)
- Friends and Lovers (1947)
- Rest and Be Thankful (1949)
- Neither Five Nor Three (1951)
- I and My True Love (1953)
- Pray for a Brave Heart (1955)
- North from Rome (1958)
- Decision at Delphi (1960)
- The Venetian Affair (1963), made into a film of the same title
- Home is the Hunter: A Comedy in Two Acts (1964)
- The Double Image (1966)
- The Salzburg Connection (1968), made into a film of the same title
- Message from Málaga (1971)
- The Snare of the Hunter (1974)
- Agent in Place (1976)
- Prelude to Terror (1978)
- The Hidden Target (1980)
- Cloak of Darkness (1982)
- Ride a Pale Horse (1984)

MacInnes' backlist fiction titles have been republished by Titan Books.

== As translator ==
- Translated Sexual Life in Ancient Rome, with Gilbert Highet, from the work of Otto Kiefer, Routledge, 1934.
- Translated Friedrich Engels: A Biography, with Gilbert Highet 1939, from the work of Gustav Meyer, Chapman and Hall, 1934.
