= Garrison's Gorillas =

- Opening Screen for Garrison's Gorillas
- Created by: Mort Green
- Starring: Ron Harper as First Lt. Craig Garrison; Cesare Danova as Actor; Brendon Boone as Chief; Rudy Solari as Casino; Christopher Cary as Goniff
- Country of origin: United States
- No. of episodes: 26

Production
- Running time: 60 minutes
- Production company: Selmur Productions

Original release
- Network: ABC
- Release: September 5, 1967 – March 12, 1968

Garrison's Gorillas is an ABC television series originally broadcast from 1967 to 1968; a total of 26 hour-long episodes were produced. It was inspired by the 1967 film The Dirty Dozen, which featured a similar scenario of training Allied prisoners for World War II military missions. It was produced by Selmur productions which had made the war series Combat!.

Garrison's Gorillas was canceled at the close of its first season and replaced by The Mod Squad in 1968. It managed to gather a cult following in China in the 1980s.

Back row, L-R: Goniff (Christopher Cary) and Chief (Brendon Boone). Front, L-R: Garrison (Ron Harper), Casino (Rudy Solari) and Actor (Cesare Danova).

== Plot ==
This action series focused on a group of commandos recruited from stateside prisons to use their special skills against the Germans in World War II. They had been promised a parole at the end of the war if they worked out (and if they lived). The alternative was an immediate return to prison; if they ran, they could expect execution for desertion. The four were: "Actor" (Cesare Danova), a handsome, resonant-voiced con man; "Casino" (Rudy Solari), a tough, wiry safe-cracker and mechanic; "Goniff" (Christopher Cary), a slender, likable cat burglar; and "Chief" (Brendon Boone), a rugged, somber American Indian who handled a switchblade like he was born to it. No real names were ever used, only their "monikers" or aliases. Led by West Pointer First Lt. Craig Garrison (Ron Harper) and headquartered in a secluded mansion in London, this slippery group ranged all over Europe in exploits that often took them behind enemy lines. Other recruits were sometimes brought in where special skills were required. In the episode "Banker's Hours", Jack Klugman's character is recruited to help loot a vault. In "The Magnificent Forger", comedian Larry Storch plays a con brought in to help 'doctor' a Gestapo list of American agents. In the two-parter "War and Crime/Plot to Kill", a con played by Richard Kiley is recruited because he is a dead ringer for a German field marshal who was part of a plot to assassinate Hitler. The episodes are set in 1941, 1942, 1943 and 1944.

== Cast ==
- Ron Harper as Lt. Craig "Warden" Garrison
- Cesare Danova as Actor
- Brendon Boone as Chief
- Rudy Solari as Casino
- Christopher Cary as Goniff

== Episodes ==
No.	Title	Directed by	Written by	Original release date
1	"The Big Con"	Joseph Sargent	David Karp	September 5, 1967
2	"Breakout"	Michael Caffey	Paul Playdon	September 12, 1967
3	"The Grab"	Nicholas Colasanto	James Menizes	September 19, 1967
4	"Banker's Hours"	Georg Fenady	Tony Barrett	September 26, 1967
5	"48 Hours to Doomsday"	Gerald Mayer	Jerry Thomas, Bill Yagemann	October 3, 1967
6	"The Great Theft"	Michael Caffey	Norman Hudis	October 10, 1967
7	"The Deadly Masquerade"	Nicholas Colasanto	Alan Caillou	October 17, 1967
8	"Now I Lay Me Down to Die"	Georg Fenady	Edward J. Lakso	October 24, 1967
9	"Operation Hellfire"	Michael Caffey	Jerry Thomas, Bill Yagemann	October 31, 1967
10	"Thieves' Holiday"	John Peyser	James Menizes	November 7, 1967
11	"20 Gallons to Kill"	Nicholas Colasanto	Barry Trivers	November 14, 1967
12	"Friendly Enemies"	Michael Caffey	Edward J. Lasko	November 21, 1967
13	"Black Market"	Georg Fenady	Tony Barrett	November 28, 1967
14	"The Great Crime Wave"	Nicholas Colasanto	Norman Hudis	December 5, 1967
15	"The Magnificent Forger"	Georg Fenady	William R. Yates	December 19, 1967
16	"The Expendables"	Georg Fenady	Paul Playdon	December 26, 1967
17	"War Games"	Michael Caffey	William R. Yates	January 2, 1968
18	"Run from Death"	Nicholas Colasanto	Shimon Wincelberg, Richard Shapiro	January 9, 1968
19	"The Death Sentence"	John Peyser	Paul Playdon	January 16, 1968
20	"The Big Lie"	Georg Fenady	Jerry Thomas, Bill Yagemann	January 23, 1968
21	"Ride of Terror"	Alan Crosland	William Froug	January 30, 1968
22	"War and Crime: Part 1"	Georg Fenady	S : Tony Barrett; T : William Robert Yates	February 13, 1968
23	"The Plot to Kill: Part 2"	Georg Fenady	S : John Draft; T : William Robert Yates	February 20, 1968
24	"The Frame-Up"	John Peyser	Henry Slesar	February 27, 1968
25	"The War Diamonds"	Michael Caffey	William Robert Yates	March 5, 1968
26	"Time Bomb"	Georg Fenady	Paul Playdon	March 12, 1968

== Reviews ==
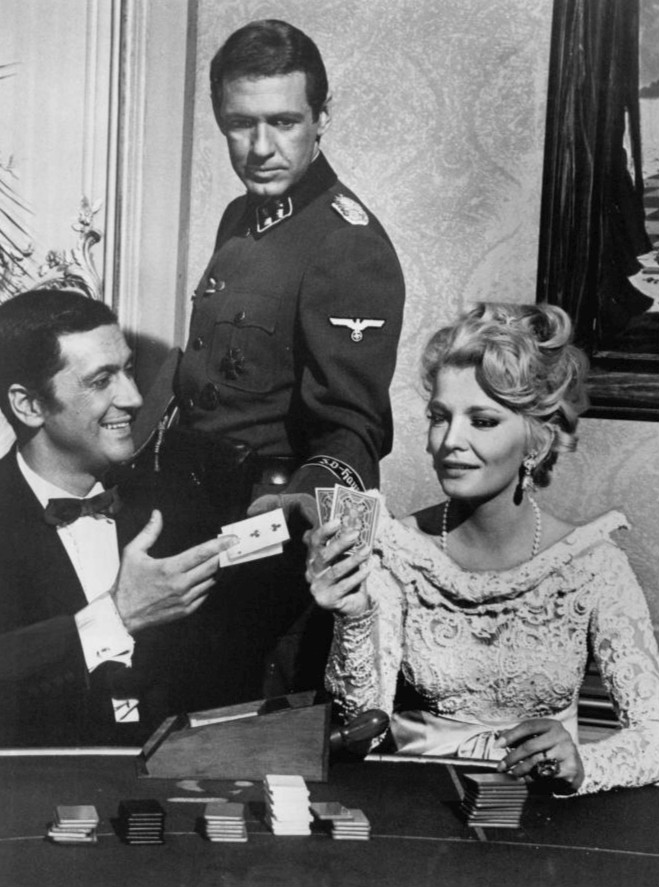
Cesare Danova, Ron Harper and Gena Rowlands in a 1968 episode

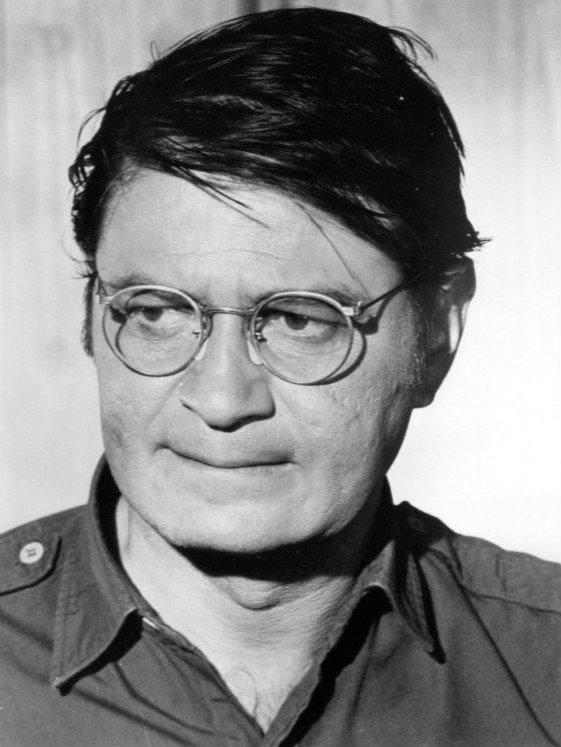
Larry Storch in "The Magnificent Forger" episode, 1967.

TV Guide reviewer Cleveland Amory said of the show in 1968 that, despite it being ludicrously one-sided, a second-hand idea, and third degree violence, that it was a first-rate show.

Because it was one of the first U.S. television shows exported to China, Garrison's Gorillas (《加里森敢死队》 Jiālǐ sēn gǎnsǐduì, or "Garrison's Death Squad") developed a certain cult status in the 1980s; supposedly, high-level meetings of the Chinese Communist Party were rescheduled so the members could watch the program. Garrison's Gorillas was even awarded a Public Security Award in Shanghai, as many Chinese people (even criminals) stayed home to watch it. The series, however, was removed from Chinese television in January 1981 for unknown reasons; speculations include the drop in crime rates as its Saturday showings proved popular among hoodlums, as well as concerns over its violence.

== Spin-offs and tie-ins ==
Dell Comics published a short-lived five issue comic book based on the series lasting from January 1968 to October 1969)

Two spin-off novels were written by Jack Pearl: the first a mass-market adult paperback published by Dell, called, simply Garrison's Gorillas; the second aimed at the young adult (YA) market and published by Whitman, titled Garrison's Gorillas and the Fear Formula. Both are long out of print.

In 1967, Leaf produced a trading card set consisting of 72 black and white photographs from the series.
