= E. Jack Neuman =

American writer and producer (1921–1998)

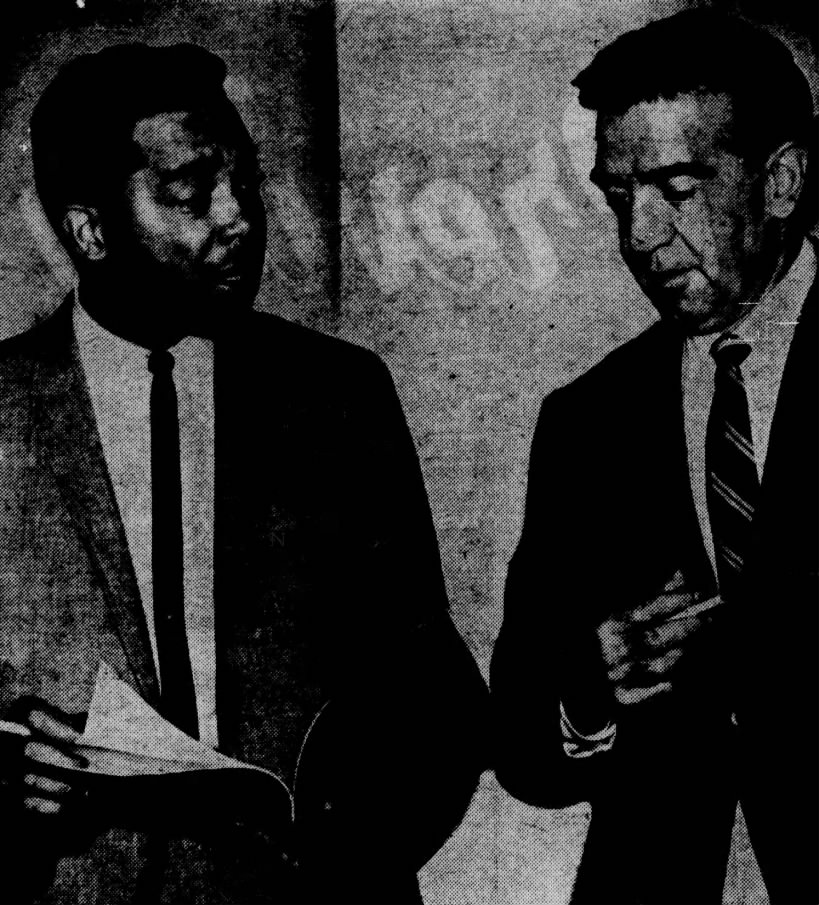
- Neuman (right) with Vince Howard, 1964
- Born: Ernest Jack Neuman; February 27, 1921; Toledo, Ohio, U.S.
- Died: January 15, 1998 (aged 76); Los Angeles, California, U.S.
- Education: University of Missouri, University of California-Los Angeles
- Occupations: Writer, producer
- Writing career
- Pen name: John Dawson; Jack Dawson
- Years active: 1943-1990
- Genres: radio, television
- Notable awards: Peabody, Edgar

Ernest Jack Neuman (February 27, 1921 – January 15, 1998) was an American writer and producer.

== Early years ==
Neuman was born in Toledo, Ohio. He moved to Denver, Colorado, as a child and graduated from Regis Jesuit High School. He attended Colorado State College in Greeley and then transferred to the University of Missouri, where he majored in journalism. He served in the U.S. Marines in World War II in the radio division of Special Services.

== Career ==
Neuman wrote for dramatic radio shows such as On Stage; Yours Truly, Johnny Dollar; Richard Diamond, Private Detective; Hallmark Hall of Fame; Fort Laramie; Pursuit; and Suspense. He wrote some episodes of Yours Truly, Johnny Dollar and Have Gun, Will Travel under the pseudonyms John Dawson and Jack Dawson. "The Shot", which he wrote for Suspense, won the Mystery Writers of America's Edgar Award for being the best radio mystery episode in 1953.

His many television credits include episodes of Frontier, Wagon Train, Bonanza, The Untouchables, Dr. Kildare, The Twilight Zone, The Asphalt Jungle, and Gunsmoke. In his lone film, The Venetian Affair (1967) he was writer, producer, and uncredited actor.

While writing for television and radio, he took creative writing classes and eventually earned a law degree from the University of California-Los Angeles. He later taught creative writing at UCLA and University of Southern California.

== Personal life ==
Neuman was married first to Irene Brodowski (Booth), with whom he had four children, and then to Marian Chulay Barbour from 1970 until his death.

== Death ==
He died on January 15, 1998, in Los Angeles, aged 76.

== Papers ==
The Wisconsin Historical Society is home to the E. Jack Neuman Papers, 1935–1982. The collection includes scripts, correspondence, production reports, and other material from his career.

== Television work ==
Title	Year	Role	Notes
You Are There	1953-1954	writer	2 episodes
Climax!	1955	writer	2 episodes; "The Long Goodbye", adapted from the Raymond Chandler novel, Edgar nomination for best episode in a television series
Gunsmoke	1955	writer	Wrote 1 episode: "Hot Spell"
The Twilight Zone	1960	writer	Wrote 1 episode: "The Trouble with Templeton"
The Asphalt Jungle	1961	writer	2 episodes; winner of the President Eisenhower Freedoms Award for "The Scott Machine"
Mr. Novak	1963-1965	writer, producer	Peabody award win
Sam Benedict	1962-1963	writer, creator	Wrote 4 episodes
Berlin Affair	1970	writer, producer	Made-for-television movie; written with Richard Alan Simmons Edgar award win for best episode in a television series, 1970
Police Story	1973-1979	writer, creator	Wrote 1 episode
Petrocelli	1974-1976	creator	
The Blue Knight	1974	writer, actor (uncredited)	Made-for-television movie; Edgar award nomination for best television feature or miniseries
Law and Order	1977	writer	Made-for-television movie; Edgar award nomination for best television feature or miniseries
Inside the Third Reich	1982	writer, producer	Miniseries; Primetime Emmy Award nomination for Outstanding Drama Special.
Voices Within: The Lives of Truddi Chase	1990	writer	Made-for-television movie; Writers Guild of America Award win for best adapted longform
