= Marian Collier (actress) =

American film and television actress (1931–2021)

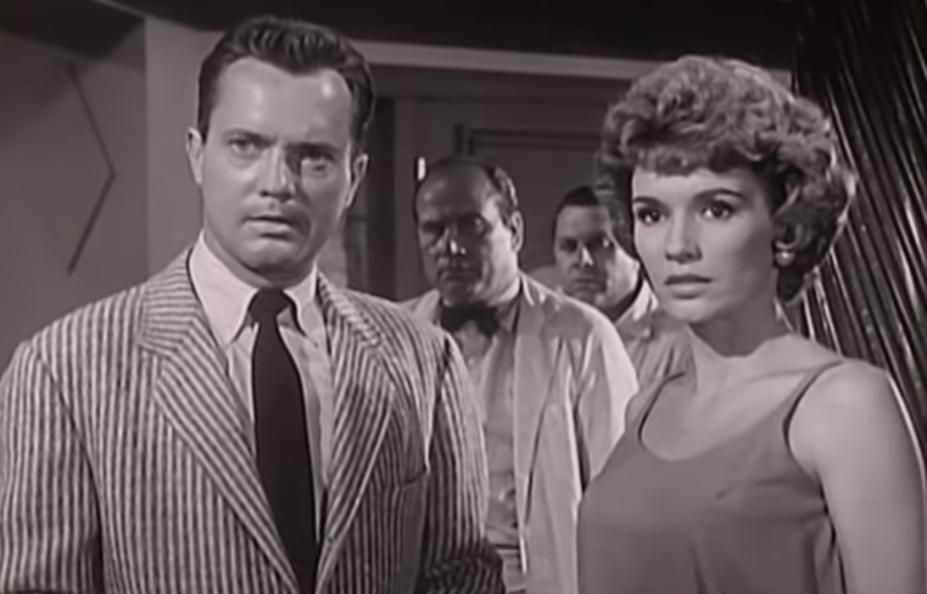
- Collier (right) with Douglas Dick and Ralph Brooks in Man with a Camera, 1959
- Born: Marian Chulay; August 23, 1931; East Chicago, Indiana, U.S.
- Died: September 3, 2021 (aged 90); Los Angeles, California, U.S.
- Occupations: Film and television actress
- Years active: 1957–2009
- Spouses: Dave Barbour (m. 1960; div. 1963) E. Jack Neuman (m. 1970; died. 1998)

Marian Collier (August 23, 1931 – September 3, 2021) was an American film and television actress. She was known for playing Marilyn Scott in the American drama television series Mr. Novak.

== Life and career ==
Collier was born in East Chicago, Indiana, the daughter of Romanian parents Valeria and John Chulay. She was the sister of assistant director and production manager, John C. Chulay who died in October 1988, from a heart attack on the set of the new ABC sitcom television series Coach. Collier attended Washington High School. She moved to New York to become a model.

Collier began her career in 1957, appearing in the television series The George Burns and Gracie Allen Show. In 1963, she won the role of Marilyn Scott, a school teacher in the new NBC drama television series Mr. Novak. The series ended in 1965. She also appeared in other television programs including Mannix, Leave It to Beaver, Law & Order, Emergency!, The Dick Van Dyke Show, McHale's Navy, The Farmer's Daughter, Perry Mason, Police Story, Welcome Back, Kotter, Bachelor Father, Gidget, Marcus Welby, M.D. and Maverick. She also co-starred and appeared in films such as The Hunting Party, Roadracers (as Liz), Three the Hard Way, Rock-A-Bye Baby, Timeline and Some Like It Hot. Collier retired in 2009. Her last credit was from the television program iCarly.

== Death ==
Collier died at her home on September 3, 2021, at the age of 90.
