= Gilbert Highet =

Scottish American classicist (1906–1978)

Gilbert Arthur Highet
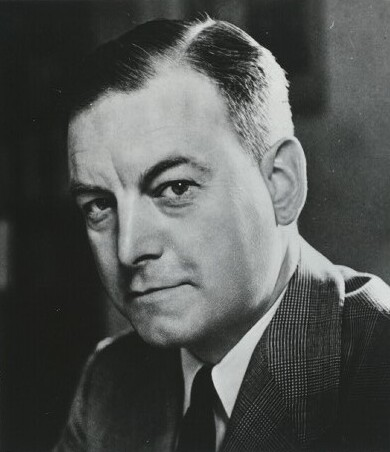
- Photograph by Elliott Erwitt
- Born: June 22, 1906; Glasgow, Scotland
- Died: January 20, 1978 (aged 71); New York City, United States
- Occupations: Classicist, academic writer, intellectual critic, and literary historian
- Spouse: Helen Clark Maclnnes (m. 1932)

Gilbert Arthur Highet (/ˈhaɪɪt/; June 22, 1906 – January 20, 1978) was a Scottish American classicist, academic writer, intellectual critic, and literary historian.

== Biography ==
Born in Glasgow, Scotland, Gilbert Highet is best known as a mid-20th-century teacher of the humanities in the United States. He attended Hillhead High School, Glasgow, Glasgow University and, on both a Snell and a Jenkyns Exhibition, Balliol College, Oxford. His Oxford career was distinguished by a First in Classical Moderations, 1930, an Ireland and Craven Scholarship, 1930, the Chancellor's Prize for Latin Verse, 1931, and a First in Literae Humaniores ('Greats', philosophy and ancient history) in 1932. He was appointed a fellow of St John's College, Oxford in 1932 and remained at the college until 1938 when he moved to Columbia University.

He had met his wife, the well-known novelist Helen MacInnes, while they were fellow-students at Glasgow, and they married in 1932. In 1938 he was appointed to the chair of Latin & Greek at Columbia University. He stayed at Columbia until 1971 (except for British Army service during World War II). He became an American citizen in 1951, following his appointment as Anthon Professor of Latin Language and Literature in 1950.

Known as a "populizer" of classical texts and a public intellectual, Highet devoted most of his energy to teaching, but he also aspired to raise the level of mass culture and achieved a broader influence by publishing essays and books, hosting his own radio program (his popular 15-minute radio shows broadcast weekly in the 1950s by more than 300 radio stations throughout the United States and Canada), acting as a judge for the Book-of-the-Month Club, and serving on the editorial board of Horizon magazine.

In 1965, at Columbia, Highet cancelled one of his lectures in order to protest that a representative of the New York Mattachine Society, an early gay rights organization, was being allowed to speak at Ferris Booth Hall.

Highet died at New York Hospital of cancer at the age of 71. In addition to his wife, Highet was survived by a son, Keith, and three grandchildren. His obituary also appeared in the January 26, 1978 issue of The Times.

== Thought ==
Like others teaching at Columbia at this time—Lionel Trilling, Mark Van Doren, Eric Bentley, Ernest Nagel—Gilbert Highet conceived of his work as the fostering of a tradition. "These are not books, lumps of lifeless paper, but 'minds' alive on the shelves," Highet wrote. He believed that "The chief aim of education is to show you, after you make a livelihood, how to enjoy living; and you can live longest and best and most rewardingly by attaining and preserving the happiness of learning."

As a scholar in an era in which democracy, communism, and fascism vied for supremacy, he believed it was the duty of the intellectual to support freedom and defend pluralism. "The aim of those who try to control thought is always the same," he wrote. "They find one single explanation of the world, one system of thought and action that will (they believe) cover everything; and then they try to impose that on all thinking people."

Above all, he was devoted to learning from the past. "History is a strange experience," he wrote in the introduction to an essay on Byzantium. "The world is quite small now; but history is large and deep. Sometimes you can go much farther by sitting in your own home and reading a book of history, than by getting onto a ship or an airplane and traveling a thousand miles. When you go to Mexico City through space, you find it a sort of cross between modern Madrid and modern Chicago, with additions of its own; but if you go to Mexico City through history, back only 500 years, you will find it as distant as though it were on another planet: inhabited by cultivated barbarians, sensitive and cruel, highly organized and still in the Copper Age, a collection of startling, of unbelievable contrasts." Despite this, as Highet showed above all in his masterpiece The Classical Tradition, it was possible to discover in the past a great humanizing river of learning which connected the present to the Biblical and especially the Greek and Roman civilizations, and through his evocative and graceful prose to make one feel at home in that flow of past lives, and to long for it. Highet tended to be critical of contemporary literature, attributing to it decadent qualities.

He himself was a highly praised teacher. Robert J. Ball, in an appreciation under the heading Living Legacies published in 2001 in the Columbia University Alumni Magazine, wrote: "When Gilbert Highet entered the classroom, one felt as though the curtain were going up on a Broadway play, with a living legend in the lead. He reminded students (not surprisingly) of a British Army officer—of the kind portrayed by Jack Hawkins in motion pictures—tall, erect, handsome, clean-shaven, and impeccably dressed. He consistently gave his audience a commanding performance, whether he spoke or sang or stood or walked, with a presence comparable to that of Laurence Olivier or John Houseman. ... With his powerful and speculative mind, he gave his students an extraordinary intellectual experience, capped by a showmanship perhaps unparalleled in the American college classroom."

== Works ==
Highet wrote voluminously. His major works include:

- An Outline of Homer (1935)
- Werner Jaeger, Paideia : die Formung des griechischen Menschen, translated by Gilbert Highet as Paideia: The Ideals of Greek Culture (3 vols, 1939–1944)
- The Classical Tradition: Greek and Roman Influences on Western Literature (1949)
- The Art of Teaching (1950)
- Another solution (1951) one of Highet's few fictional pieces, published in Harper's Magazine.
- People, Places and Books (1953)
- A Clerk of Oxenford: Essays on Literature and Life (1954)
- Man's Unconquerable Mind (1954)
- The Migration of Ideas (1954)
- Juvenal the Satirist: A Study (1954)
- Poets in a Landscape (1957)
- Talents and Geniuses (1957)
- The Powers of Poetry (1960)
- The Anatomy of Satire (1962)
- Explorations (1971)
- The Immortal Profession: The Joys of Teaching and Learning (1976)
- The Speeches in Vergil's Aeneid (1972)
- The Classical Papers of Gilbert Highet, edited by Robert J. Ball (1983)
- The Unpublished Lectures of Gilbert Highet, edited by Robert J. Ball (1998)

Highet contributed a satirical essay, 'Motherhood', to Red Rags : Essays of Hate from Oxford, ed. R.C. Carr, London : Chapman & Hall, 1933, 77–85.
