= The Venetian Affair (film) =

1967 film by Jerry Thorpe

- Theatrical release poster by Frank McCarthy
- Directed by: Jerry Thorpe
- Screenplay by: E. Jack Neuman
- Produced by: E. Jack Neuman; Jerry Thorpe
- Starring: Robert Vaughn; Elke Sommer; Felicia Farr; Karl Boehm; Boris Karloff; Roger C. Carmel; Luciana Paluzzi
- Cinematography: Milton R. Krasner
- Edited by: Henry Berman
- Music by: Lalo Schifrin
- Distributed by: Metro-Goldwyn-Mayer
- Release date: January 18, 1967
- Running time: 89 minutes
- Country: United States
- Language: English

The Venetian Affair is a 1967 spy film starring Robert Vaughn and Elke Sommer. Directed by Jerry Thorpe, it is based on the 1963 novel of the same name by Helen MacInnes. E. Jack Neuman was both producer and screenwriter.

The picture was made by MGM for theatrical release, and is not one of the ersatz features edited from The Man from U.N.C.L.E. episodes originally produced by MGM Television during the same period.

== Plot ==
A former CIA agent, Bill Fenner, in an alcoholic slide and working as a reporter for a wire service, is sent to Venice to investigate the shock suicide bombing by an American diplomat at a peace conference.

CIA chief Frank Rosenfeld specifically requests Fenner come out of retirement because one of the suspects in the case is Fenner's ex-wife, Sandra Fane, who is believed to be a Communist sympathizer. A secret report by Dr. Vaugiroud could be the key, but Fenner's and Fane's lives are greatly endangered, particularly at the hands of a mysterious man named Wahl, while trying to unravel the plot.

== Cast ==
- Robert Vaughn as Bill Fenner
- Elke Sommer as Sandra Fane
- Felicia Farr as Claire Connor
- Boris Karloff as Dr. Pierre Vaugiroud
- Ed Asner as Frank Rosenfeld
- Karl Boehm as Robert Wahl
- Roger C. Carmel as Mike Ballard
- Luciana Paluzzi as Giulia Almeranti

== Production ==
The Venetian Affair was shot on location in Venice, Italy. Writer/producer E. Jack Neuman has an uncredited bit as the suicide bomber in the opening scene.

== Release ==
The Venetian Affair was released in theatres on January 18, 1967. The film was released on DVD by Warner Archive Collection on October 18, 2011.

== Reception ==
Bosley Crowther of The New York Times wrote in his review: "It's a totally inane and posy picture about an American newspaper photographer who gets involved in an international intrigue in Venice which has something to do with obtaining a secret report. [...] Some nice color photography in Venice is the only plus feature of this film, which is based on a novel by Helen MacInnes."

== See also ==
- List of American films of 1967
