= Freeman (TV pilot) =

- Genre: Sitcom
- Created by: Bernie Kukoff, Jeff Harris, Paul Mooney
- Written by: Paul Mooney
- Directed by: Hal Cooper
- Starring: Stu Gilliam; Beverly Sanders; Linden Chiles; Jimmy Baio; Melinda Dillon
- Country of origin: United States
- Original language: English

Production
- Executive producers: Bernie Kukoff, Jeff Harris, Paul Mooney
- Running time: 22–24 minutes
- Production companies: Kukoff-Harris Productions, Harry Stoones Inc.

Original release
- Network: ABC
- Release: June 19, 1976

Freeman is an American sitcom pilot created by Bernie Kukoff, Jeff Harris, and Paul Mooney. It premiered on ABC on June 19, 1976, but was not picked up for a full series.

== Plot ==
Freeman revolves around the conflict between the Wainrights, a middle class, New York-based family which has seemingly found its dream house in an affluent Connecticut suburb, and Freeman, the house's recalcitrant, African American erstwhile inhabitant, who just happens to be a ghost.

== Cast ==
- Stu Gilliam as Freeman,
- Beverly Sanders as Helen Wainright
- Linden Chiles as Dwight Wainright
- Jimmy Baio as Timmy Wainright
- Melinda Dillon as Madam Arkadina

== Reception ==
Variety critic Bob Knight (aka Bok) commends the cast as a whole, while viewing Gilliam's performance in the title role—not to mention the ubiquitous "trick" camerawork—as both overdone and underwhelming.

Gilliam appeared without his upper teeth and gave the role an overplayed Fred Sanford flavor, so the pilot had a strained sound despite good playing by Beverly Sanders, Linden Chiles and Jimmy Baio [...] Sanders was especially telling with her timing and delivery. Melinda Dillon as a late-arriving ghost-finder had the choicest material in her brief appearance and made the most of it [... T]he standard now-you-see-him, now-you-don't camera tricks were worked overtime, with no indication that that threadbare gimmick could keep "Freeman" going very long as a series.

Almost diametrically opposed is the take offered by Michigan Chronicle columnist Bill Lane.

Stu Gilliam scored mightily in his television film role of 'Freeman,' the ghost who became a permanent guest in the home of a white family. A lot of laughs when Gilliam cracked that oldtimer on the show, 'Don't let the doorknob hitcha where the bulldog bitcha.' And just think, Gilliam got the role when the producers, calling on Godfrey Cambridge, found the latter bedded down with the flu.

Sadly for all those connected with the show, it was Variety's view that evidently prevailed at ABC; no additional episodes—nor even news—of this prospective series ever surfaced.

== See also ==
- List of television series canceled before airing an episode
