= Don Brodie =

American actor (1904–2001)

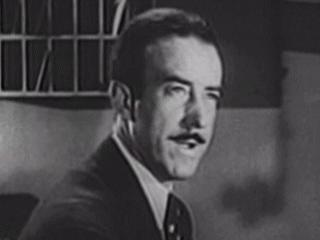
- Brodie in Second Chorus (1940)
- Born: Donald Ellis Brodie; May 29, 1904; Cincinnati, Ohio, U.S.
- Died: January 8, 2001 (aged 96); Los Angeles, California, U.S.
- Occupation: Actor
- Years active: c. 1922–1989

Donald Ellis Brodie (May 29, 1904 – January 8, 2001) was an American film and television actor.

== Early years ==
The youngest of six children born to Frank Ellis Brodie and Charlotte Moonert, Donald Brodie was raised in Cincinnati's Avondale neighborhood and attended Hughes High School and the University of Cincinnati. Before becoming a professional actor, Brodie worked in Procter & Gamble's main offices. At age 16, his first-place finish-this-'filmerick' entry was published in The Cincinnati Post:

Little Mary Miles Minter was ill;
She thought that she needed a pill.
Lon Chaney said: "Tarry,
I'll fetch Wesley Barry,
With his capers, the pain he will kill.

== Career ==
As early as 1922, Brodie was acting on stage. In 1924, he co-starred in a production of Lord Dunsany's Fame and the Poet. In November 1927, a story in The Cincinnati Post mentions "Donald Brodie" among the players in the Emery Theatre production of Mrs. Leopold Markbreit's comedy, Diplomatic Perplexities. Five months later, a review in The Cincinnati Enquirer listed him in the cast of the Civic Theater's production of The Pigeon.

Brodie worked with Cincinnati's Civic Repertory Theater for nine years.

A veteran of over 250 film and television productions, Brodie signed his first film contract with Universal Pictures Corporation in 1931. Initially signed as a "feature comedian" and promoted as "Steve" Brodie, a name "already famous as a synonym for daring" (presumably a reference to the suddenly like-named bridge-jumper), Universal evidently thought better of this plan; the nickname was dropped well before Brodie made his debut later that year in the two-reeler, Out Stepping.

He appeared as a callow, mustachioed actor in various utility roles in films from the early 1930s. Usually playing bit parts in features, his more notable credits include his voiceover work in the Disney cartoon features Pinocchio and Dumbo and his portrayal of a carefully used car lot owner in the film noir classic Detour. He also worked off and on as a dialogue director.

In 1938, Brodie, with considerable media fanfare, landed by far the most substantial role of his screen career: prominently featured in the fifth installment of Universal's Crime Club series, The Last Express. (He had appeared uncredited in each of the four prior entries). Although the film was widely dismissed by critics, those few reviewers who did more than merely mention Brodie by name lauded his contribution. The Jackson Sun describes leading man Kent Taylor and Brodie as "mak[ing] most of meaty roles of private detective and stooge, respectively," and notes that "Brodie adapts himself readily to the comic relief," while the Liverpool Evening Express deems Brodie "very amusing as [Taylor's] assistant."

In 1944, Brodie earned what would prove his sole screen directing credit with A Fig Leaf for Eve. He did get a chance to direct again in 1957, helming the hour-long pilot episode for a proposed series entitled Tricks for Living, scripted by Mary Wellman Harris and starring Dell O'Dell. However, it does not appear that this episode was ever aired.

Brodie's final appearance in a film came in Goodnight, Sweet Marilyn (1989).

== Personal life ==
On March 7, 1930, Brodie married Lucille I. Becker.

== Death ==
On January 8, 2001, Brodie died in Los Angeles, California. His entry in the reference work Obituaries in the Performing Arts, 2001: Film, Television, Radio, Theatre, Dance, Music, Cartoons and Pop Culture gave his age as 101 and his birth date as May 29, 1899.

== Selected filmography ==
- Name the Woman aka The Woman Within (1934) as Reporter
- The Call of the Savage (1935) as Dr. Carl Neff (as Don Brody)
- Manhattan Moon (1935) as Reporter
- Strike Me Pink (1936) as Mr. Marsh
- Missing Girls (1936) as Chuck Martin (uncredited)
- Find the Witness (1937) as Reporter
- Partners in Crime (1937) as Reporter
- The Lady in the Morgue (1938) as Taxi Driver
- The Last Express (1938) as Spud Savage
- The Rookie Cop (1939) as Frank 'Frankie' Dixon
- Exile Express (1939) as Mullins
- Music in My Heart (1940) as Taxi Driver
- Second Chorus (1940) as Clerk
- Scattergood Meets Broadway (1941) as Waiter
- Two Latins from Manhattan (1941) as Advertising Man
- A Fig Leaf for Eve aka Desirable Woman (1944) as Director
- The Woman in the Window (1944) as Onlooker at Gallery (uncredited)
- The Man Who Walked Alone (1945) as Desk Sergeant #1
- A Letter for Evie (1946) as Barker (uncredited)
- For You I Die (1947) as Motorist at Diner (uncredited)
- Street Corner (1948) as Arnold Marsh
- The Ghost Talks (1949) as Tom the tailor
- Counterspy Meets Scotland Yard (1950) as Jimmy, a Thug
- The Atomic City (1952) as FBI Agent (uncredited)
- The Story of Will Rogers (1952) as Reporter (uncredited)
- April in Paris (1952) as Employee (uncredited)
- The I Don't Care Girl (1953) (uncredited)
- Sword of Venus (1953) as Jailer (uncredited)
- The Great Adventures of Captain Kidd (1953, Serial) as Kidd Crewman (uncredited)
- Donovan's Brain (1953) as Detective Who Follows Dr. Cory from Hotel (uncredited)
- Hell's Outpost (1954) as Miner (uncredited)
- Meet the O'Briens (1954, TV Movie) as Collodney
- The Proud Ones (1956) as Hotel Clerk (uncredited)
- Fear Strikes Out (1957) as Reporter Evans (uncredited)
- Beau James (1957) as Reporter (uncredited)
- Bell Book and Candle (1958) as Cab Driver (uncredited)
- The Ladies Man (1961) as Makeup Man (uncredited)
- The Comancheros (1961) as Card Dealer (uncredited)
- Ride the High Country (1962) as Spieler (uncredited)
- Diary of a Madman (1963) as Marcel the Postman
- It Happened at the World's Fair (1963) as Dice Player (uncredited)
- The Patsy (1964) as Bowler (uncredited)
- The Chase (1966) as Conventioneer (uncredited)
- The Busy Body (1967) as Board Member
- How to Commit Marriage (1969) as Pevney (uncredited)
- Little Big Man (1970) as Stage Passenger (uncredited)
- Blackenstein (1973) as Police Lieutenant
- Escape to Witch Mountain (1975) as Gasoline Attendant
- Goodbye, Norma Jean (1976) as Projectionist
- Eat My Dust! (1976) as Old Man Lewis
- The Last Tycoon (1976) as Extra on Set (uncredited)
- Hughes and Harlow: Angels in Hell (1977) as Director
- Hot Lead and Cold Feet (1978) as Saloon Man #3
- Heart Beat (1980) as Dispatcher
- ...All the Marbles (1981) as Reno Timekeeper
- Murphy's Law (1986) as Old Man
- Goodnight, Sweet Marilyn (1989) as Projectionist
