= David Sabin =

American actor

David Sabin (born April 24, 1937) is an American actor who has worked on Broadway theatre, TV and as member of the Shakespeare Theatre Company. He was born in Washington, District of Columbia, US.

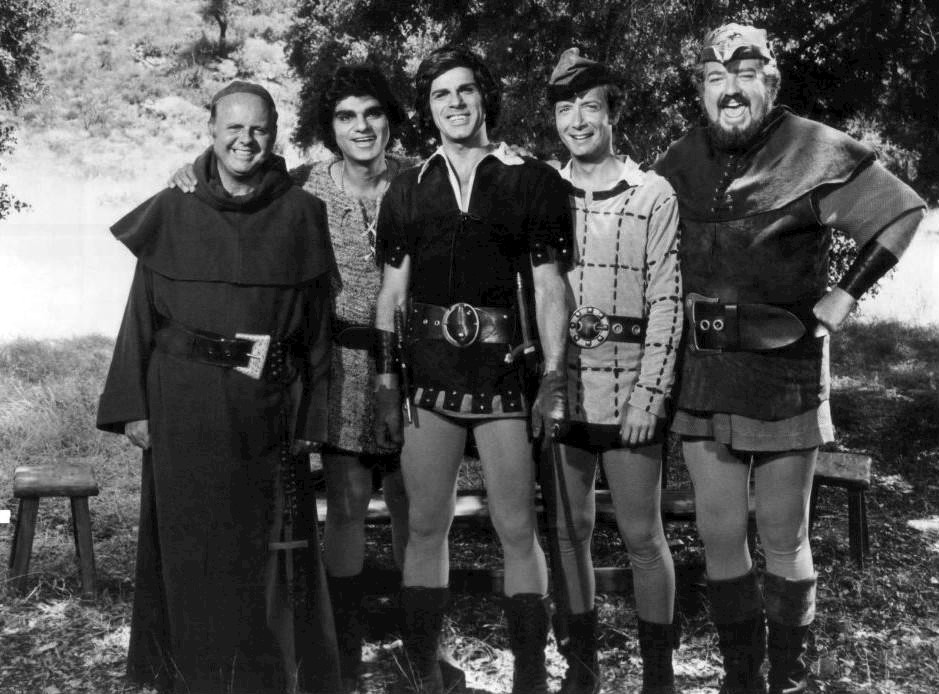
From When Things Were Rotten (1975). L-R: Dick Van Patten, Richard Dimitri, Dick Gautier, Bernie Kopell, David Sabin

Sabin has played many Shakespearian parts, including a standout performance as Stephan in The Tempest, Falstaff in Daniel Fish's adaptation of The Merry Wives of Windsor in 1998, a role he had previously played in Michael Kahn's 1994 adaptation. He was also in Mark Lamos's 2003 production of A Midsummer's Night Dream where he played Bottom.

Sabin's theatre credits include being in the original cast of The Water Engine as Morton Gross, the 1991 Chicago production of Lend Me a Tenor as Saunders, the 1998 stage adaptation of Tennessee Williams' Sweet Bird of Youth and the 2011 staging of Follies on Broadway as Dimitri Wiesmann.

Sabin had numerous appearances on television shows, playing Crawford in the 1975 episode of Kojak Secret Snow Deadly Snow; as General Carter in the mini series Kennedy; The Rockford Files ("A Bad Deal in the Valley"); St. Elsewhere, and Highway to Heaven. Sabin's best known role was playing Little John from the 1975 Mel Brooks-produced television show When Things Were Rotten.

Sabin has won nominations including The James MacArthur Award for Outstanding Supporting Actor, Resident Play (1995, 2003 and 2005) and The Robert Prosky Award for Outstanding Lead Actor, Resident Play (2004).

Sabin retired from acting in the late 2017.
