= When Things Were Rotten =

American sitcom (1975)

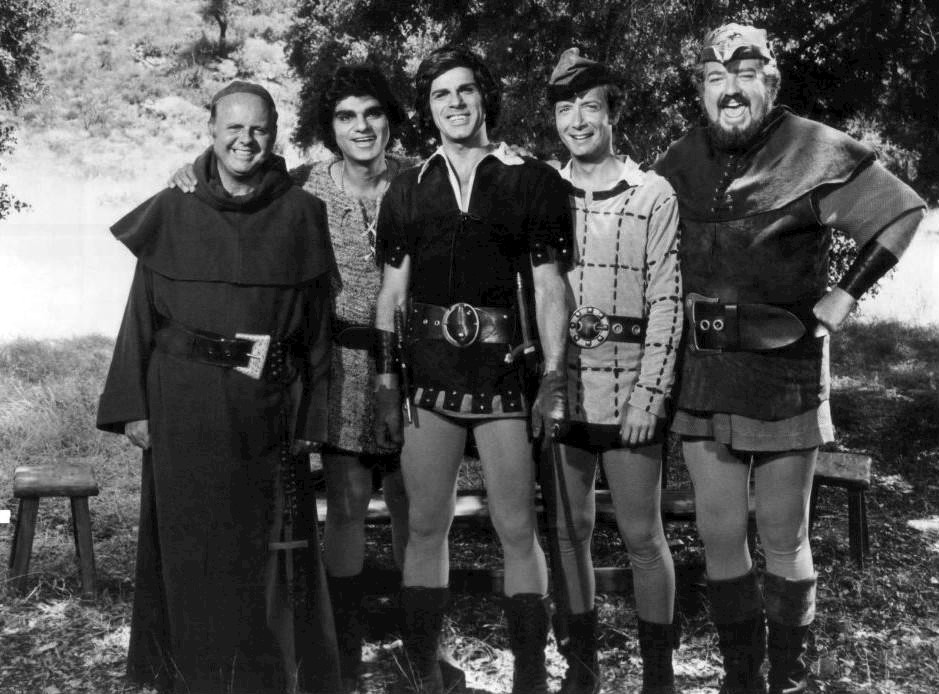
- Robin Hood and his Merry Men
- Genre: Parody; Sitcom; Adventure
- Created by: Mel Brooks; Norman Stiles; John Boni
- Starring: Dick Gautier; Dick Van Patten; Bernie Kopell; Richard Dimitri; Henry Polic II; Misty Rowe; David Sabin; Ron Rifkin
- Composer: Artie Butler
- Country of origin: United States
- Original language: English
- No. of seasons: 1
- No. of episodes: 13

Production
- Producers: Mel Brooks; Stanley Jacob; Norman Steinberg
- Running time: 30 minutes
- Production companies: Crossbow Productions; Paramount Television

Original release
- Network: ABC
- Release: September 10 – December 3, 1975

When Things Were Rotten is an American sitcom television series created in 1975 by Mel Brooks and set in 1197 as a parody of the Robin Hood legend. It aired for half a season on the ABC network. The series starred Dick Gautier as the handsome and heroic Robin Hood.

The series received mostly critical acclaim, though John Leonard wrote that watching it was "like being locked inside a package of bubblegum where the only card is Alvin Dark." It failed to find an audience and was cancelled after 13 episodes. The Bionic Woman was its midseason replacement, and became a great success. Eighteen years later, Brooks produced another Robin Hood parody, the feature film Robin Hood: Men in Tights.

The complete series was released on DVD in 2013 as a manufactured-on-demand item exclusively available on Amazon.com's CreateSpace.

== Cast ==
- Dick Gautier as Robin Hood
- Dick Van Patten as Friar Tuck
- Bernie Kopell as Alan-a-Dale
- Richard Dimitri as Bertram and Renaldo
- Henry Polic II as Hubert, the Sheriff of Nottingham
- Misty Rowe as Maid Marian
- David Sabin as Little John
- Ron Rifkin as Prince John

== Episodes ==
No.	Title	Directed by	Written by	Original release date
1	"The Capture of Robin Hood"	Jerry Paris	Mel Brooks, John Boni & Norman Stiles	September 10, 1975
2	"The French Dis-connection"	Coby Ruskin	S : Gene Wood and Jay Burton; T : Bo Kaprall and Pat Profit	September 17, 1975
3	"The House Band"	Joshua Shelley	Barry E. Blitzer & Jack Kaplan	September 24, 1975
4	"Those Wedding Bell Blues"	Marty Feldman	Jim Mulligan	October 1, 1975
5	"A Ransom for Richard"	Peter H. Hunt	William Raynor & Myles Wilder	October 8, 1975
6	"The Ultimate Weapon"	Peter Bonerz	Steve Zacharias	October 15, 1975
7	"Ding Dong, the Bell is Dead"	Bruce Bilson	Les Roberts	October 22, 1975
8	"There Goes the Neighborhood"	Cory Ruskin	Tony Geiss and Thomas Meehan	October 29, 1975
9	"Quarantine"	Norman Abbott	John Reiger & Garry Markowitz	November 12, 1975
10	"Birthday Blues"	Peter H. Hunt	Harry Lee Scott and Robert Sand	November 19, 1975
11	"The Spy: Parts 1 and 2"	Peter H. Hunt	Lawrence H. Siegel	November 26, 1975
12	"The Spy: Parts 1 and 2"	Peter H. Hunt	Lawrence H. Siegel	November 26, 1975
13	"This Lance for Hire"	Joshua Shelley	Jack Amob & Bruce Selitz	December 3, 1975

== See also ==
- List of films and television series featuring Robin Hood
