= Goodnight, Sweet Marilyn =

- Directed by: Larry Buchanan
- Written by: Larry Buchanan
- Produced by: Larry Buchanan
- Starring: Misty Rowe; Paula Lane; Jeremy Slate; Phyllis Coates
- Release date: 1989
- Country: United States
- Language: English

Goodnight, Sweet Marilyn is a 1989 film by director Larry Buchanan. The film is a follow-up to his 1976 film Goodbye, Norma Jean, and starred Misty Rowe reprising her role as the young Marilyn Monroe.

== Cast ==
- Paula Lane as Marilyn Monroe
- Misty Rowe as Norma Jean Baker
- Jeremy Slate as "Mesquite"
- Joyce Lower as Psychiatrist
- Ken Hicks as Medical Doctor
- Phyllis Coates as Gladys Pearl Baker
- George Niles Berry as Masseur
- Gerry Hopkins as Madison Square Garden Announcer
- Terence Locke as Ralph Johnson
- Patch Mackenzie as Ruth Latimer
- Preston Hanson as Hal James
- Marty Zagon as Irving Oblach
- Andre Philippe as Sam Dunn
- Adele Claire as Beverly
- Sal Ponti as Randy Palmer
- Stuart Lancaster as George
- Garth Pillsbury as Police Officer
