= Joe and Sons =

- Genre: Sitcom
- Created by: Robert Illes; James Stein; Jeff Harris; Bernie Kukoff
- Written by: Bob Illes; Mike Milligan
- Directed by: Peter Baldwin
- Starring: Richard S. Castellano; Barry Miller; Jimmy Baio; Jerry Stiller; Bobbi Jordan; Florence Stanley
- Composer: David Shire
- Country of origin: United States
- Original language: English
- No. of seasons: 1
- No. of episodes: 14

Production
- Executive producer: Douglas S. Cramer
- Producers: Jeff Harris; Bernie Kukoff
- Running time: 30 minutes
- Production companies: Douglas S. Cramer; Kukoff-Harris Partnership

Original release
- Network: CBS
- Release: September 9, 1975 – January 13, 1976

Joe and Sons is an American television sitcom that aired on CBS from September 9, 1975 to January 13, 1976. It ran for a total of 14 episodes.

== Premise ==
The show focused on Joe Vitale, an Italian-American widower, who lived in Hoboken, New Jersey with his teenage sons Mark and Nick. Gus Duzik worked with him as a typical middle-class family worker at the Hoboken Sheet and Tube Company. Estelle was a cocktail waitress who lived in the apartment across the hall who helped Joe with his sons and liked to cook an occasional meal for the family.

== Cast ==
- Richard S. Castellano as Joe Vitale
- Barry Miller as Mark Vitale
- Jimmy Baio as Nick Vitale
- Jerry Stiller as Gus Duzik
- Bobbi Jordan as Estelle
- Florence Stanley as Aunt Josephine

== Episodes ==
No.	Title	Directed by	Written by	Original release date
0	"Joe and Sons"	Unknown	Unknown	April 18, 1975
Series pilot: Joe is worried about the mysterious behavior of his older son, who has been coming home late and falling asleep in class.
1	"Mark's Doubt"	Peter Baldwin	Jay Moriarty & Mike Milligan	September 9, 1975
Blue collar worker Joe Vitale, a widower, has his hands full with two growing sons and an odd assortment of concerned friends, family and neighbors. A theological crisis begins the season, as the older boy declares his doubt in the existence of God.
2	"Nick's Book"	Unknown	Robert Illes & James Stein	September 23, 1975
Joe is enraged when he discovers that his 12-year-old son's biology book contains an explicit section on sex education.
3	"Joe's Date"	Unknown	Adele & Burt Styler	September 30, 1975
The promise of romance has Joe in a fever of anticipation as he prepares for a reunion with the bombshell of his high school class.
4	"Carmela"	Unknown	George Almeyda	October 7, 1975
Joe worries when he learns that Mark is dating the daughter of wild Flora (Dimitra Arliss), a woman who had a dubious reputation in high school.
5	"Joe's Cruise"	Unknown	Jeffrey Minches	October 14, 1975
During a pandemonium-filled morning, Joe must choose between attending an annual boat ride with Gus or chauffeuring his kids around the city.
6	"A Real Lady"	Unknown	Unknown	October 21, 1975
Josephine plays matchmaker, arranging a blind date between Joe and a widow who inherited a garbage-truck company from her husband.
7	"Uncle Charlie's Problem"	Unknown	Unknown	November 4, 1975
Joe willingly agrees to take Uncle Charlie after the sprightly old codger runs away from a retirement home.
8	"The Desperate Minutes"	Unknown	Unknown	November 21, 1975
Gus is suing the city of Hoboken for $2,000,000 for "bodily injuries and mental anguish" he suffered while riding a bus that collided with a car.
9	"Clothes Don't Necessarily Make the Man"	Unknown	Unknown	December 2, 1975
Nick claims to be studying ballet for cultural enrichment, but his Aunt Josephine is beginning to worry about her nephew's masculinity.
10	"Pot Luck"	Unknown	Unknown	December 16, 1975
A house plant left by Mark's long-haired friend is making Joe nervous; he's sure it's marijuana.
11	"Nick's Problem"	Unknown	Unknown	December 23, 1975
Nick, who has taken great pains to hide his bed-wetting from the others, finds himself the object of much concern when his secret is discovered.
12	"Thou Shalt Steal"	Unknown	Unknown	January 6, 1976
Gus fears for his life after running out of a crap game without paying up his losses.
13	"Jimmy Flynn's Wake"	Unknown	Unknown	January 13, 1976
Joe is trapped into holding a wake at his house for Gus's lately departed friend even though he never even knew the guy.
