= Richard Dimitri =

American actor and comedian (1942–2025)

- Born: June 27, 1942; Yonkers, New York, U.S.
- Died: December 18, 2025 (aged 83); Los Angeles, California, U.S.
- Occupation: Actor
- Years active: 1975–1999

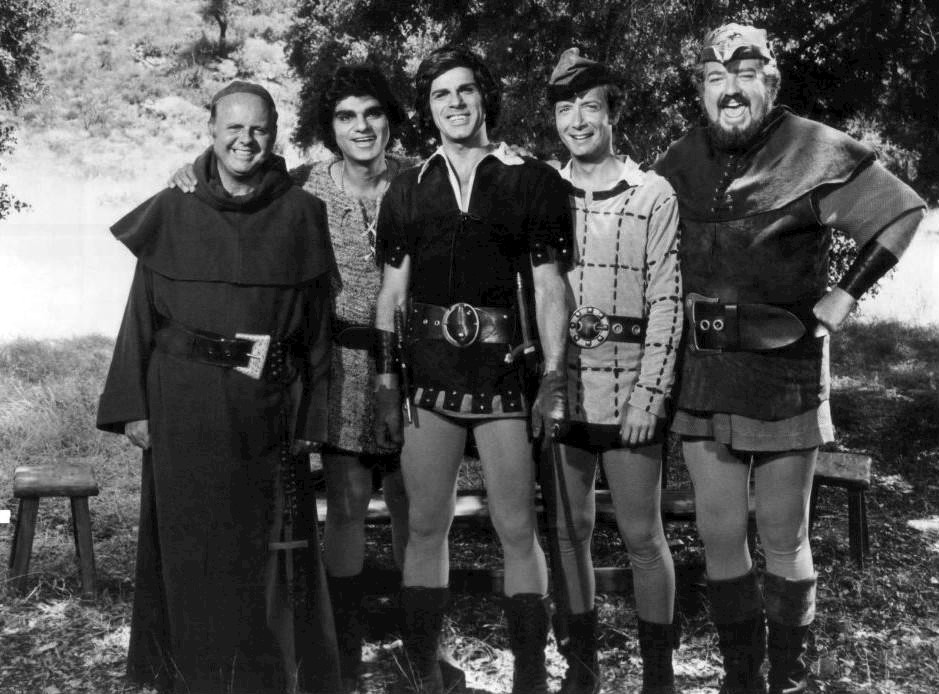
From When Things Were Rotten (1975). L-R: Dick Van Patten, Richard Dimitri, Dick Gautier, Bernie Kopell, David Sabin

Richard Dimitri (June 27, 1942 – December 18, 2025) was an American character actor and comedian principally known for his roles as the twin characters of Bertram and Renaldo in the 1975 Mel Brooks television show When Things Were Rotten and Roman Troy Moronie in the 1984 film Johnny Dangerously.

Dimitri also had supporting roles in the 1977 film The World's Greatest Lover with Gene Wilder and Carol Kane, and the 1989 film Let It Ride with Richard Dreyfuss, as well as numerous appearances on television shows like Hawaii Five-O (1968), the 1977 miniseries Seventh Avenue, and the late 1990s Tracey Ullman show Tracey Takes On...

He was credited as a writer on the show Going Bananas, a live-action superhero show created by the Hanna-Barbera studios, and also produced and wrote a pilot for a comedy show called Roosevelt and Truman, about a pair of bail bondsmen/security guards with the names Roosevelt and Truman.

Dimitri died in Los Angeles on December 18, 2025, at the age of 83.
