= Melinda Dillon =

American actress (1939–2023)

- Dillon in 1977
- Born: Melinda Ruth Clardy; October 13, 1939; Hope, Arkansas, U.S.
- Died: January 9, 2023 (aged 83); Los Angeles, California, U.S.
- Other name: Linda Dillon
- Education: Goodman School of Drama
- Occupation: Actress
- Years active: 1959–2007
- Known for: Jillian Guiler in Close Encounters of the Third Kind (1977); Teresa Perrone in Absence of Malice (1981); Mrs. Parker in A Christmas Story (1983)
- Spouse: Richard Libertini (m. 1963; div. 1978)
- Children: 1

Melinda Dillon (born Melinda Ruth Clardy; October 13, 1939 – January 9, 2023) was an American actress. She was nominated for a 1963 Tony Award for her Broadway debut in the original production of Who's Afraid of Virginia Woolf? and was nominated for the Academy Award for Best Supporting Actress for her roles in Close Encounters of the Third Kind (1977) and Absence of Malice (1981).

She is well-known for her role as Mrs. Parker in the holiday classic A Christmas Story (1983). Her other film roles include Bound for Glory (1976), Slap Shot (1977), F.I.S.T. (1978), Harry and the Hendersons (1987), Captain America (1990), The Prince of Tides (1991), To Wong Foo, Thanks for Everything, Julie Newmar (1995), How to Make an American Quilt (1995), Magnolia (1999), for which she was nominated for a Screen Actors Guild Award, and Reign Over Me (2007).

== Early life and education ==
Dillon was born as Melinda Ruth Clardy on October 13, 1939, in Hope, Arkansas, but raised in Cullman, Alabama. (Note: As Dillon explained in a 1962 interview, Hope was not her hometown, nor had her parents ever resided there. It was only because they had lost their previous child at birth that Floyd Clardy opted to bring Norine to Hope, where a doctor that he knew and trusted happened to practice.) After spending four years in Germany while her father was stationed on a base there, Dillon attended Hyde Park High School and the Goodman School of Drama at the Art Institute of Chicago (now at DePaul University) in Chicago.

== Career ==
Though best known for her supporting performances in films, Dillon began as an improvisational comedian and stage actress. Recalling her performance as Sonya in a 1961 student production of Chekhov's Uncle Vanya, Alan Schneider wrote:

What distinguished and made the whole attempt worthwhile for me was casting the role of Sonya with a young actress named Linda [sic] Dillon, who was a senior acting student at Goodman as well as a hanger-on with a Second City troupe that included two young performers named Barbara Harris and Alan Arkin. During our tryouts, John Reich, then the Goodman Theatre's artistic director, had seriously tried to discourage me from using Linda. He admitted her talent but warned me that she was highly volatile and completely unpredictable as an actress. He had found another actress whom he found much more suitable for Sonya. I insisted on using Linda, no matter the consequences. I was fascinated by the combination of her fragility and sensuality, intrigued with the unconventional way in which she was able to make a line seem utterly spontaneous, and impressed with her emotional range and richness. During our four weeks of rehearsal [...], I wound up alternately adoring and hating Linda. She always did too much and yet not enough. She was never the same twice in a given scene, even when she had found something wonderful last time. She was always wanting to quit the cast or leave school or kill herself. And yet, at the same time, I felt she was extraordinary, the most talented young actress I'd ever worked with, the potential peer of Geraldine Page and perhaps even Kim Stanley. I was sure she'd be a big star one day, and I wanted to be with her when that happened.

Dillon's first major role was as Honey in the original 1962 Broadway production of Edward Albee's Who's Afraid of Virginia Woolf?, for which she was nominated for the Tony Award for Best Performance by a Featured Actress in a Play. At the time of her death, she was the last surviving cast member of the original production. In addition, she also appeared in You Know I Can't Hear You When the Water's Running and Paul Sill's Story Theatre.

In 1959, she acted in The Cry of Jazz, a short film dealing with jazz music and Black culture. Dillon's first feature film was The April Fools in 1969. She also worked in television, including a guest-starring role in 1969 on an episode of the TV series Bonanza titled "A Lawman's Lot Is Not a Happy One" (Season 11). She co-starred with David Carradine in the 1976 Woody Guthrie biopic Bound for Glory and was nominated in the Best Female Acting Debut category of the Golden Globe for her role as Memphis Sue.

The following year she was nominated for a Best Supporting Actress Oscar for the role of a mother whose child is abducted by aliens in Steven Spielberg's Close Encounters of the Third Kind. That same year, she had a role in the comedy Slap Shot with Paul Newman. Four years later, Dillon was again nominated for a Best Supporting Actress Oscar for her performance as a suicidal teacher in Absence of Malice in 1981, working again with Newman.

Dillon was perhaps best known for her role as the mother of Ralphie and Randy in Bob Clark's 1983 movie A Christmas Story. The film was based on a series of short stories and novels written by Jean Shepherd about young Ralphie Parker (played by Peter Billingsley) and his quest for a Red Ryder BB gun from Santa Claus. She was replaced by Julie Hagerty in the 2022 direct sequel A Christmas Story Christmas. According to Peter Billingsley, she was retired from acting at that time, but gave her full support on the project.

Four years later, Dillon co-starred with John Lithgow in the Bigfoot comedy Harry and the Hendersons. She continued to be active in stage and film throughout the 1990s, taking roles in the superhero film Captain America, the Barbra Streisand drama The Prince of Tides, the low-budget Lou Diamond Phillips thriller Sioux City, the comedy To Wong Foo, Thanks for Everything, Julie Newmar, and the drama How to Make an American Quilt.

In 1999, she appeared in Magnolia, directed by Paul Thomas Anderson, as Rose Gator, the wife of terminally ill television game-show host Jimmy Gator (Philip Baker Hall). In 2005, she guest-starred in the episode of Law & Order: Special Victims Unit titled "Blood". Dillon's last major acting roles were in the 2007 film Reign Over Me and in three episodes of the short-lived TNT medical drama Heartland.

== Personal life ==
Dillon married actor Richard Libertini, with whom she had a son, in 1963. They divorced in 1978.

Dillon was a Methodist. She was a staffer on Democrat Eugene McCarthy's 1968 presidential campaign. From 1976 to 1998, she was an active parishioner of the Our Lady of Malibu Catholic Church in Malibu, California.

=== Death ===
Dillon died on January 9, 2023, at the age of 83. Her death wasn't confirmed until the following month on February 3. Following her death, she was cremated by the Neptune Society, with her ashes being given to her family.

== Filmography ==
=== Film ===
Year	Title	Role	Notes
1959	The Cry of Jazz	Faye	Short film
1969	The April Fools	Leslie Hopkins	
1976	Bound for Glory	Mary	
1977	Slap Shot	Suzanne Hanrahan	
1977	Close Encounters of the Third Kind	Jillian Guiler	
1978	F.I.S.T.	Anna Zarinkas	
1981	Absence of Malice	Teresa Perrone	
1983	A Christmas Story	Mrs. Parker	
1984	Songwriter	Honey Carder	
1987	Harry and the Hendersons	Nancy Henderson	
1989	Staying Together	Eileen McDermott	
1990	Captain America	Sarah Rogers	
1990	Spontaneous Combustion	Nina	
1991	The Prince of Tides	Savannah Wingo	
1994	Sioux City	Leah Goldman	
1995	To Wong Foo, Thanks for Everything! Julie Newmar	Merna	
1995	How to Make an American Quilt	Mrs. Darling	
1996	Entertaining Angels: The Dorothy Day Story	Sister Aloysius	
1999	Magnolia	Rose Gator	
2001	Cowboy Up	Rose Braxton	
2004	Debating Robert Lee	Mrs. Lee	
2005	Adam & Steve	Dottie	
2007	Reign Over Me	Ginger Timpleman	

=== Television ===
Year	Title	Role	Notes
1963	The Defenders	Jeannie Birch	Episode: "The Empty Heart"
1964	East Side/West Side	Stacey Barbella	Episode: "The Beatnik and the Policeman"
1969	Bonanza	Cissy Summers	Episode: "A Lawman's Lot Is Not a Happy One"
1970	Storefront Lawyers	Connie Swann	Episode: "He Lies Better Than I Tell the Truth"
1975	The Jeffersons	Daphne	Episode: "Harry and Daphne"
1976	Sara	Lily Henchard	Episode: "Lady"
1979	CHiPs		Episode: "Death Watch"
1981–82	Insight	Various roles	3 episodes
1983	The Mississippi		Episode: "Cradle to Grave"
1984	Insight	Woman	Episode: "The Game Room"
1985	The Twilight Zone	Penny	Episode: "A Little Peace and Quiet"
1995	The Client	Verna Caldwell	Episode: "The Peach Orchard"
1996	Picket Fences	Mrs. Klausner	Episode: "Liver Let Die"
1997	Tracey Takes On...	Desiree	Episode: "Mothers"
2001	Judging Amy	Violet Loomis	Episode: "Surprised by Gravity"
2003	The Lyon's Den	Charlotte Barrington	Episode: "Pilot"
2005	Law & Order: Special Victims Unit	Jenny Rogers	Episode: "Blood"
2007	Heartland	Janet Jacobs	3 episodes

==== TV films, miniseries, and specials ====
Year	Title	Role	Notes
1976	Freeman	Madam Arkadina	Failed pilot
1977	Enigma	Dora Herren	
1978	The Critical List	Kris Lassiter	
1979	Transplant	Anne Hurley	
1980	Marriage Is Alive and Well	Jeannie	
1980	The Shadow Box	Agnes	
1981	Fallen Angel	Sherry Phillips	
1982	The Juggler of Notre Dame	Dulcy	
1983	Right of Way	Ruda Dwyer	
1985	Space	Rachel Mott	
1986	Shattered Spirits	Joyce Mollencamp	
1988	Shattered Innocence	Sharon Anderson	
1989	Nightbreaker	Paula Brown	
1993	Judgment Day: The John List Story	Elanor List	
1994	State of Emergency	Betty Anderson	
1995	Naomi & Wynonna: Love Can Build a Bridge	Polly Judd	
2003	A Painted House	Gran Chandler	

== Stage credits ==
Year	Title	Role	Venue	Notes
1959	Jack and the Beanstalk		Goodman Theatre, Chicago	Credited as 'Linda Dillon'
1960	Rumpelstiltskin		Goodman Theatre, Chicago	Credited as 'Linda Dillon'
1961	Uncle Vanya	Sonya	Arena Stage, Washington D.C.	Credited as 'Linda Dillon'
1961	The Caucasian Chalk Circle		Arena Stage, Washington D.C.	Credited as 'Linda Dillon'
1962	Who's Afraid of Virginia Woolf?	Honey	Billy Rose Theatre, New York City	
1967–69	You Know I Can't Hear You When The Water's Running	Jill/Clarice/Dorothy	Ambassador Theatre, New York City	
1967–69	You Know I Can't Hear You When The Water's Running	Jill/Clarice/Dorothy	Broadhurst Theatre, New York City	
1967–69	You Know I Can't Hear You When The Water's Running	Jill/Clarice/Dorothy	Lunt-Fontanne Theatre, New York City	
1969	A Way of Life	Lily Seltzer	ANTA Playhouse, New York City	
1970	Paul Sills' Story Theatre	Daughter/Goosey Poosey/Princess/Wife/Peasant	Ambassador Theatre, New York City	
1971	Ovid's Metamorphosis	Ensemble	Ambassador Theatre, New York City	

== Awards and nominations ==
Award	Year	Category	Work	Result
Academy Awards	1978	Best Actress in a Supporting Role	Close Encounters of the Third Kind	Nominated
Academy Awards	1982	Best Actress in a Supporting Role	Absence of Malice	Nominated
Actor Awards	2000	Best Cast Ensemble	Magnolia	Won
CableACE Awards	1995	Best Supporting Actress in a Movie or Miniseries	State of Emergency	Nominated
Florida Film Critics Circle Awards	2000	Best Ensemble Cast	Magnolia	Won
Golden Globe Awards	1977	New Star of the Year – Actress	Bound for Glory	Nominated
Los Angeles Film Critics Association Awards	1981	Best Supporting Actress	Absence of Malice	Nominated
Method Fest	2006	Best Ensemble Cast	Debating Robert Lee	Won
Photoplay Awards	1978	Favorite Movie	Close Encounters of the Third Kind	Nominated
Prism Awards	2006	Best Performance in a Drama Series Episode	Law & Order: Special Victims Unit	Nominated
Saturn Awards	1978	Best Actress	Close Encounters of the Third Kind	Nominated
Saturn Awards	1988	Best Actress	Harry and the Hendersons	Nominated
Kansas City Film Critics Circle Awards	1981	Best Supporting Actress	Absence of Malice	Won
Theatre World Awards	1963	Theatre World Award	Who's Afraid of Virginia Woolf?	Won
Tony Awards	1963	Best Featured Actress in a Play	Who's Afraid of Virginia Woolf?	Nominated
