= Detective School =

- Also known as: Detective School – One Flight Up
- Genre: Situation comedy
- Written by: Jeff Harris; Bernie Kukoff
- Directed by: Bob LaHendro; Jeff Harris; Bernie Kukoff; Walter C. Miller
- Starring: James Gregory; Douglas Fowley; Randolph Mantooth; Melinda Naud; Taylor Negron; LaWanda Page; Pat Proft
- Composer: Peter Matz
- Country of origin: United States
- Original language: English
- No. of seasons: 2
- No. of episodes: 13

Production
- Executive producers: Jeff Harris; Bernie Kukoff; Caryn Sneider
- Producer: Hank Bradford
- Running time: 30 min.
- Production company: Kukoff-Harris Partnership

Original release
- Network: ABC
- Release: July 31 – November 24, 1979

Detective School is an American television sitcom that ran on ABC for four months in 1979, for a total of 13 episodes.

The show was about an assortment of students who went to night school to learn basic detective skills, but who kept being caught up in real criminal cases and getting themselves and their teacher (an inept private investigator) into trouble.

This show was written, directed and produced by Jeff Harris and Bernie Kukoff, the creators of Diff'rent Strokes.

== Cast and characters ==
- James Gregory as Nick Hannigan, the inept P.I. who teaches the class
- Douglas Fowley as Robert Redford, an elderly student who just happens to have the same name as the actor
- Randolph Mantooth as salesman Eddie Dawkins
- Melinda Naud as lingerie model Maggie Ferguson
- Taylor Negron as disco-dancing Silvio Galindez
- LaWanda Page as loudmouthed housewife Charlene Jenkins
- Pat Proft as door-to-door salesman Leo Frick

== Episodes ==
=== Series overview ===
Season	Episodes	Originally released	
Season	Episodes	First released	Last released
1	3	July 31, 1979	August 14, 1979
2	10	September 15, 1979	November 24, 1979

=== Season 1 (1979) ===
No. overall	No. in season	Title	Directed by	Written by	Original release date
1	1	"A Bier on the House"	Bernie Kukoff, Jeff Harris	Bernie Kukoff, Jeff Harris	July 31, 1979
Private eye Nick Harrigan teaches eager aspiring gumshoes who become suspicious when they notice ice cream trucks making regular deliveries to a funeral home.
2	2	"Oh, How We Danced"	Bernie Kukoff, Jeff Harris	Bernie Kukoff, Jeff Harris	August 7, 1979
Nick's gun turns up missing — right after Charlene goes off to confront her cheating spouse.
3	3	"Lucy in the Sky with Pizza"	Bernie Kukoff, Jeff Harris	Bernie Kukoff, Jeff Harris	August 14, 1979
Nick and his students investigate a diamond-stealing racket in a pizza parlor.

=== Season 2 (1979) ===
No. overall	No. in season	Title	Directed by	Written by	Original release date
4	1	"Hooray for Bulgaria"	Ralph Levy	Bernie Kukoff, Jeff Harris	September 15, 1979
The class poses as caterers at an embassy party to rescue a Bulgarian ballet dancer.
5	2	"Nick Is Smitten"	Walter C. Miller	Bernie Kukoff, Jeff Harris	September 22, 1979
Nick's eagerness to help an attractive woman lands him in a trap set by a vengeful racketeer.
6	3	"Ice"	Walter C. Miller	Bernard Dilbert	September 28, 1979
Nick and the gang bodyguard a rich woman as she attends a fancy party wearing a priceless diamond.
7	4	"The Runaway"	Walter C. Miller	Ellen Guylas	October 6, 1979
The class goes undercover as a motorcycle gang to retrieve Nick's runaway niece.
8	5	"The Jewel Heist"	Bob LaHendro	Bernie Kukoff, Jeff Harris	October 13, 1979
Nick's students break into the wrong hotel room while on an assignment to retrieve stolen jewelry.
9	6	"One Word Is Worth a Thousand Pictures"	Bernie Kukoff, Jeff Harris	Tucker Wiard, Bernie Kukoff, Jeff Harris	October 20, 1979
Nick tries to catch a blackmailer while the class searches her apartment for the incriminating photographs.
10	7	"Masseuse in the Cold, Cold Ground"	Bob LaHendro	Bernie Kukoff, Jeff Harris	October 27, 1979
Nick and the students investigate a massage parlor to catch a killer.
11	8	"The Killer-Diller Lingerie Caper"	Bob LaHendro	Bernie Kukoff, Jeff Harris	November 3, 1979
Silvio witnesses a murder — but does not recognize the investigating officer as the killer.
12	9	"Farewell, My Miss Glendale"	Bob LaHendro	Toni Sherohman, Pat Proft	November 17, 1979
The students search for a bomb while Nick judges a beauty pageant.
13	10	"The Bank Job"	Bob LaHendro	Hank Bradford	November 24, 1979
Bank robbers take Nick and his students hostage.
