= Misty Rowe =

American actress

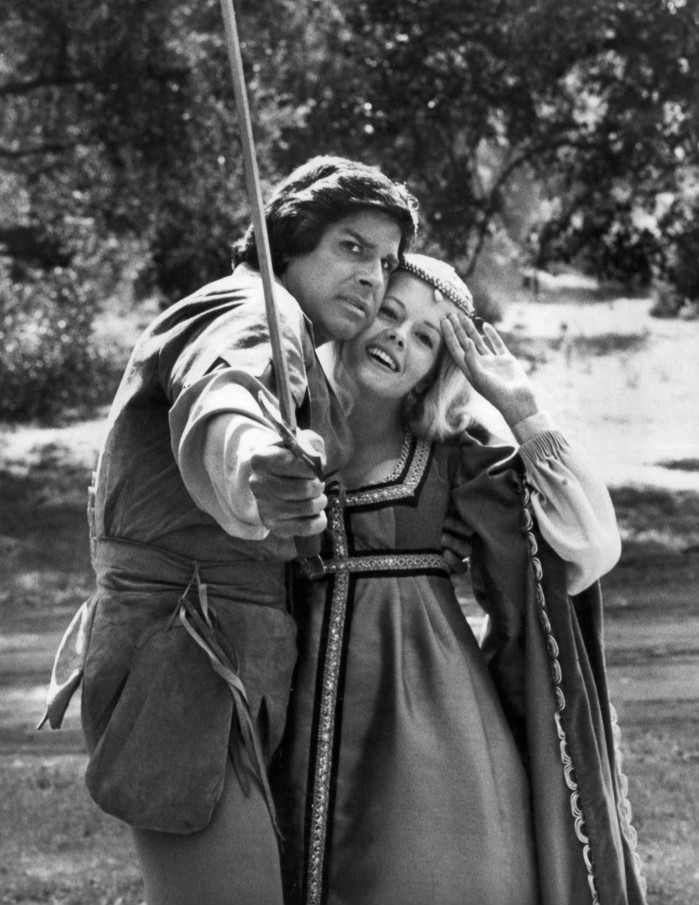
- Rowe and Dick Gautier in When Things Were Rotten, 1975
- Born: June 1, 1952 (age 73); San Gabriel, California, U.S.
- Occupation: Actress
- Years active: 1972–1991
- Spouse(s): James DePaiva (m. 1986; div. 1995) Barry Singer (m. 2006)
- Children: 1
- Website: mistyrowe.com

Mistella Rowe (born June 1, 1952) is an American actress. She is best known for portraying the perky, squeaky-voiced blonde on the American television series Hee Haw for 19 years, often appearing as Junior Samples's assistant during used-car comedy segments. Rowe and other "honeys" on the series were notable for performing in cleavage-inducing halter tops, hot pants, and country-style minidresses. Rowe also starred in the 1978 Hee Haw spin-off Hee Haw Honeys, cast with then-newcomer Kathie Lee Gifford (then known as Kathie Lee Johnson) as the singing daughters of truck stop diner owners portrayed by Hee Haw regulars Lulu Roman and Kenny Price. Rowe later appeared in a national road show version of the series entitled Hee Haw Honey Reunion.

== Early years ==
Rowe's father was a mechanic. She studied at the Pasadena Playhouse on a scholarship. When she was young, people made fun of her because of her lisp, causing her to stop talking for a year when she was 12. Speech therapy helped to correct the problem. Rowe was born in San Gabriel, California. She left home at age 17 to go to Hollywood, where she lived at the Hollywood Studio Club.

== Film and television ==
In addition to her roles on Hee Haw and Hee Haw Honeys, Rowe portrayed carhop Wendy in early seasons of the sitcom Happy Days and Maid Marian in the Mel Brooks-produced When Things Were Rotten (1975). Rowe's 1980s television appearances include several episodes of Fantasy Island and The Love Boat and portraying a country music singer on Airwolf.

On film, Rowe has twice portrayed Marilyn Monroe, in Goodbye, Norma Jean (1976) and Goodnight, Sweet Marilyn (1989). Her other film credits include The Hitchhikers (1972), Loose Shoes (1980), The Man with Bogart's Face (1980), National Lampoon's Class Reunion (1982), and Meatballs Part II (1984), and the television movie SST: Death Flight (1977).

== Stage ==
Rowe's stage credits include children's theater (Misty's Magic Moo Town), appearing as Patsy Cline in the off-Broadway musical Always...Patsy Cline, and the Atlantic City production Misty Christmas, Finally a Fruitcake You'll Like! In 2010, Rowe appeared in the self-written, off-Broadway musical Fandance: The Legend of Sally Rand.

== Personal life ==
While Rowe was married to actor James DePaiva, her unborn baby died in the spring of 1990. She recovered to give birth to a daughter in July 1992. In 1995 she announced DePaiva had requested a divorce. She married for the second time, in 2006, Barry Singer

== In other media ==
Austin, Texas rock band Young Heart Attack wrote a song called "Misty Rowe". In a 2004 interview, songwriter Steven Hall said about the song: "I was obsessed with this actress [Rowe] who was on Hee Haw and Happy Days. She was really sexy and Misty Rowe was the first woman on television who made me feel...different."
