= Johnny Dangerously =

1984 film by Amy Heckerling

- Theatrical release poster by Drew Struzan
- Directed by: Amy Heckerling
- Screenplay by: Harry Colomby; Jeff Harris
- Story by: Bernie Kukoff; Norman Steinberg
- Produced by: Michael Hertzberg
- Starring: Michael Keaton; Joe Piscopo; Marilu Henner; Maureen Stapleton; Peter Boyle; Griffin Dunne; Glynnis O'Connor; Dom DeLuise; Richard Dimitri; Dick Butkus; Danny DeVito
- Cinematography: David M. Walsh
- Edited by: Pembroke J. Herring
- Music by: John Morris
- Production companies: 20th Century-Fox; Edgewood Productions
- Distributed by: 20th Century-Fox
- Release date: December 21, 1984
- Running time: 90 minutes
- Country: United States
- Language: English
- Budget: $9 million
- Box office: $17.1 million

Johnny Dangerously is a 1984 American crime comedy film directed by Amy Heckerling; two of its four screenwriters, Jeff Harris and Bernie Kukoff, had previously created the hit series Diff'rent Strokes.

The film, a parody of 1930s crime/gangster movies, stars Michael Keaton as an honest, goodhearted man who turns to a life of crime to finance his mother's skyrocketing medical bills and to put his younger brother through law school. Joe Piscopo, Marilu Henner, Maureen Stapleton, Peter Boyle, Griffin Dunne, Dom DeLuise, Danny DeVito, Dick Butkus and Alan Hale Jr. also star in the film.

Part of the film's comedic appeal is the frequent use of malapropisms by Johnny and other crime characters, especially in instances where curse words were intended.

== Plot ==
In 1935, a pet shop owner catches a young boy shoplifting a puppy. To discourage the kid from a life of crime, the owner tells a story by way of a flashback.

In 1910, Johnny Kelly is a poor newsboy in New York City. Johnny's mother, Ma Kelly, needs an operation that his family cannot afford. Since Johnny's criminal father was executed, Ma has supported her sons by doing other people's laundry. Johnny gets into a street fight with a boy named Danny Vermin, which attracts the notice of crime boss Jocko Dundee, who offers Johnny a job. Seeing no honest way to earn the money for Ma's operation, Johnny agrees, even though it would break her heart. He helps rob a rival nightclub belonging to Roman Moronie, a malapropist of swear words. When Jocko asks Johnny for his name, he replies, "Johnny Dangerously."

Years pass. With Ma's continuing medical problems, Johnny decides to work for Dundee full-time. Everyone knows that Kelly is really Johnny Dangerously, except for Ma and Johnny's younger brother Tommy, who think he owns a nightclub. Similarly, the gang knows nothing of Ma and Tommy. One day, Johnny comes to Dundee's headquarters to find he has taken on two new gang members: Danny Vermin, and his sidekick Dutch. Danny uses opera audiences as shooting galleries. As the two gangs continue to war, Johnny falls for Lil Sheridan, a young showgirl new to the big city. Eventually, Johnny becomes the boss of the Dundee gang and negotiates a truce with Moronie.

Eventually, Tommy graduates from law school, unknowingly funded by Johnny's illicit earnings. He goes to work for the District Attorney's office, under D.A. Burr, who is on Johnny's payroll. Burr tries to sidetrack Tommy, who has become a major public figure after hearings look into Moronie's activities. Meanwhile, Burr and Vermin conspire to kill Tommy by cutting the brakes on his car. Tommy is badly injured, but survives. Johnny has Burr killed in revenge, which leaves Tommy as the new District Attorney. Vermin discovers that Dangerously is the D.A.'s brother, and Tommy overhears Vermin chortling about it. Tommy confronts Johnny, who agrees to turn over the evidence against himself to the Crime Commissioner. However, as Johnny enters the Commissioner's office, he finds him dead, and Vermin knocks him out and frames Johnny for the murder.

Johnny is arrested, but insists that he was framed. His lucky cigarette case is missing, and whoever has it is the guilty party. Nonetheless, Johnny is found guilty, sentenced to the electric chair and sent to Death Row. But when Vermin congratulates Tommy, he drops Johnny's cigarette case. Tommy realizes that Johnny is innocent, and that Vermin is the actual perpetrator. Johnny arrives on Death Row and receives rock star treatment from the starstruck warden. Johnny learns that Tommy is in danger and plots an escape, requesting that the warden move up his execution to that very night. As he is taken to the chair, Johnny assembles what looks like a tommy gun from parts handed to him by inmates and bluffs his way out. With Lil Sheridan as his getaway driver, they elude their pursuers in a laundry truck which has been covered in layers of shelf paper, enabling them to change their vehicle's description by peeling it off little by little. They arrive at a movie theatre where Vermin and Dutch are behind the screen, planning to kill Tommy. Johnny runs to the front row, sees Vermin's gun barrel protruding from a slit cut in the screen, jumps in front of Tommy, and shoots and wounds Vermin. Tommy is uninjured, as Vermin's bullet was stopped by Johnny's cigarette case, which Tommy had put in his jacket breast pocket. Vermin is arrested as the governor pardons Johnny.

The story returns to 1935. The young shoplifter is starstruck. The pet shop owner wraps up his story and sends the boy off with a kitten and the lesson "crime doesn't pay." When the boy leaves, the owner changes into a tuxedo and heads off in a limo with Lil – revealing himself to be Johnny.

== Cast ==
- Michael Keaton as Johnny Kelly (a.k.a. Johnny Dangerously)
  - Byron Thames as young Johnny
- Joe Piscopo as Danny Vermin
  - Georg Olden as young Danny
- Marilu Henner as Lil Sheridan
- Maureen Stapleton as Ma Kelly
- Peter Boyle as Jocko Dundee
- Richard Dimitri as Roman Troy Moronie
- Griffin Dunne as Tommy Kelly
  - Troy Slaten as young Tommy
- Dom DeLuise as The Pope
- Danny DeVito as Burr
- Dick Butkus as Arthur
- Glynnis O'Connor as Sally
- Ron Carey as Pat
- Ray Walston as Vendor
- Carl Gottlieb as Dr. Magnus (credited as Carl A. Gottlieb)
- Scott Thomson as Charley
- Jack Nance as Priest
- Rick Rosenthal as Judge (credited as Richard L. Rosenthal)
- Neal Israel as Dr. Zilman
- Alan Hale, Jr. as Desk Sergeant (credited as Alan Hale)
- Hal Riddle as Warden
- Chuck Hicks as Governor
- Hank Garrett as Mayor
- Sudie Bond as Mary Margaret Catherine Dineen
- Bob Eubanks as M.C.
- Taylor Negron as Delivery Man (uncredited)
- Vincent Schiavelli as Roman Moronie's Building Planner (uncredited)
- Joe Flaherty as Death Row inmate (uncredited)
- Amy Heckerling as Restaurant Patron (uncredited)

== Music ==
The theme song "This Is the Life" was written for the film by "Weird Al" Yankovic, though, for legal reasons, the song was not featured on home video releases of the film until the DVD was released in 2002. The VHS home video version of the film featured a version of the Cole Porter song "Let's Misbehave". The music video for Yankovic's song incorporates scenes from the movie.

== Release ==
Upon release the film failed to attract the same attention and box office success as Heckerling's previous film Fast Times at Ridgemont High. Heckerling later attributed the film's failure to the public being unfamiliar with the gangster film genre, saying "it was pure satire of something nobody remembers. I think that was the main problem, because all the actors and writers did great jobs. But we were definitely satirizing something ... I mean, unless you watch 1930s movies on TV at night, people don't remember. Somebody told me that during a screening they were sitting next to Brian De Palma, who had just done Scarface, and he was in hysterics. If you studied those movies, you know what we were doing."

== Critical reception ==
The film received mixed reviews and holds a 44% "Rotten" approval rating on review aggregator Rotten Tomatoes based on 16 reviews. On Metacritic, it holds a rating of 54 out of 100 based on 10 reviews, indicating "Mixed or average reviews." According to Mary G. Hurd, the film "is loaded with sight gags, one liners, numerous sexual jokes, and puns". But many critics found it to be a comedy which relies on sophomoric humor. According to Gwendolyn Audrey Foster, the film is both a gangster comedy and an homage to 1930s gangster films, but is perhaps too clever for a mainstream audience. According to Leigh Hallisey, the film is a parody of "old-school" gangster films and reveals Heckerling's awareness of their conventions and stereotypes. Foster finds the comedies of Amy Heckerling to rely on "fast-paced, witty repartee and droll humor", and draws comparisons to those of Frank Tashlin and Jerry Lewis.

== Bibliography ==
- Foster, Gwendolyn Audrey (1995), "Heckerling, Amy", Women Film Directors: An International Bio-critical Dictionary, Greenwood Publishing Group, ISBN 978-0313289729
- Hallisey, Leigh (2002), "Amy Heckerling", Contemporary North American Film Directors: A Wallflower Critical Guide, Wallflower Press, ISBN 978-1903364529
- Hurd, Mary G. (2007), "Amy Heckerling", Women Directors and Their Films, Greenwood Publishing Group, ISBN 978-0275985783
- Norden, Martin F. (1994), "High-Tech Heroics and Other Concerns", The Cinema of Isolation: A History of Physical Disability in the Movies, Rutgers University Press, ISBN 978-0813521046
