= Harry Colomby =

American producer and screenwriter (1929–2021)

- Born: August 20, 1929; Berlin, Brandenburg, Prussia, Germany
- Died: December 25, 2021 (aged 92); Los Angeles, California, U.S.
- Education: Columbia University
- Occupations: Manager, Producer, screenwriter
- Spouse: Lee Colomby
- Children: Scott Colomby
- Family: Bobby Colomby (brother)

Harry Colomby (August 20, 1929 – December 25, 2021) was an American talent manager, producer and screenwriter.

While still a schoolteacher of English and social studies at a High School in New York City, he became the manager of the jazz pianist Thelonious Monk in 1955, and remained so for the next 14 years. His other clients were jazz pianist/singer Mose Allison, comedian John Byner and the actor Michael Keaton.

Colomby co-scripted and produced the 1984 film Johnny Dangerously alongside Jeff Harris, Bernie Kukoff and Norman Steinberg. He died in Los Angeles, California on December 25, 2021, at the age of 92.
