= Paul Gilbert (actor) =

American actor (1918–1976)

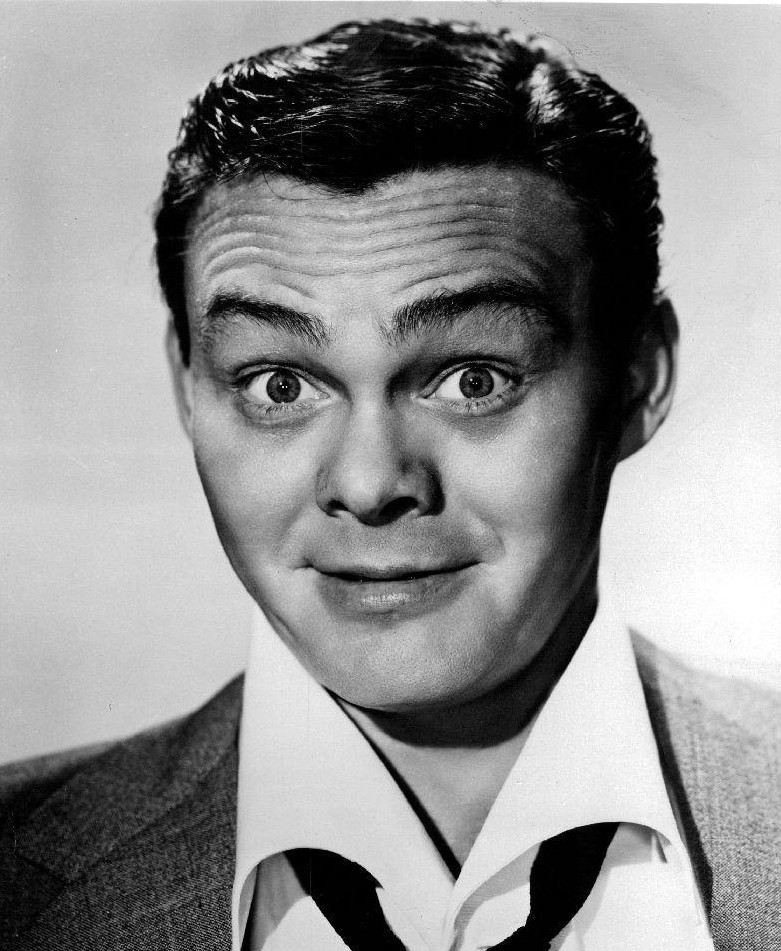
- Gilbert, c. 1954
- Born: Ed MacMahon; December 27, 1918; New York City, U.S.
- Died: February 13, 1976 (aged 57); Hollywood, Los Angeles, U.S.
- Occupation: Actor
- Years active: 1954–1973
- Spouse: Barbara Crane
- Children: Melissa Gilbert; Jonathan Gilbert

Paul Gilbert (born Ed MacMahon; December 27, 1918 – February 13, 1976) was an American film and television actor.

== Biography ==
Gilbert was born Ed MacMahon, on December 27, 1918, in New York City. His family were vaudeville performers, and he began his career as an aerialist until he had a fall. He continued performing music, dancing and comedy.

Gilbert starred in the 1954 series The Duke as a former boxer who has decided to give up his fighting career to become a respectable nightclub owner. In the pilot episode, Gilbert sings, dances, juggles and plays four instruments in the band.

Gilbert played various roles and performed on numerous shows including The Spike Jones Show in 1954. He played the role of murder victim Harrison Boring in the 1964 Perry Mason episode "The Case of the Blonde Bonanza." Gilbert also appeared in other early television shows such as The NBC Comedy Hour, The Colgate Comedy Hour and Lux Video Theatre.

In the 1960s, Gilbert was seen on several network television series including The Dick Van Dyke Show, The Hollywood Palace, Gomer Pyle, U.S.M.C., Good Morning World and The Dean Martin Show. An accomplished juggler, Gilbert appeared on Rowan and Martin's Laugh-In as a French juggler.

On May 9, 1964, Gilbert and wife Barbara (née Crane) adopted one-day-old Melissa Gilbert, who played Laura Ingalls Wilder on the long-running NBC series Little House on the Prairie. They later adopted Jonathan Gilbert, who played Willie Oleson on Little House on the Prairie.

== Death ==
Gilbert was believed to have died on February 13, 1976, aged 57, in Hollywood, from a stroke. In her autobiography, Melissa Gilbert wrote that he died by suicide due to suffering from constant pain stemming from World War II injuries while serving as a fighter pilot in the Air Corps. He was buried at Forest Lawn Memorial Park (Hollywood Hills) in Los Angeles.

== Filmography ==
Year	Title	Role	Notes
1955	So This Is Paris	Davy Jones	
1955	The Second Greatest Sex	Roscoe Dobbs	
1956	You Can't Run Away from It	George Shapely	
1964	3 Nuts in Search of a Bolt	Joe Lynch	
1965	Sylvia	Lola Diamond	
1965	Cat Ballou	Train Messenger	
1966	Women of the Prehistoric Planet	Lt. Red Bradley	
