= The Duke (TV series) =

- Genre: Comedy
- Written by: Charles Issacs; Jack Elinson
- Starring: Paul Gilbert; Phyllis Coates; Allen Jenkins
- Country of origin: United States
- Original language: English
- No. of seasons: 1
- No. of episodes: 13

Production
- Producer: Bill Harmon
- Running time: 24 mins.

Original release
- Network: NBC
- Release: July 2 – September 3, 1954

The Duke is an American comedy series that aired on NBC from July 2 to September 3, 1954. The series was broadcast live on Fridays from 8 to 8:30 p.m. Eastern Time.

== Synopsis ==
Duke London a/k/a Duke Zenlee was a professional boxer who was also an accomplished painter. Through his artwork he met Rudy Cromwell, who offered to teach him to live a more cultured life. Duke left the boxing ring and opened a nightclub called The Duke's, but both his former promoter and trainer kept trying to persuade him to make a prize-fighting comeback.

== Cast ==
- Paul Gilbert as Duke London
- Allen Jenkins as Johnny, Duke's former trainer
- Phyllis Coates as Gloria, his girlfriend
- Rudy Cromwell as Claude Stroud, Duke's business partner
- Sheldon Leonard as Sam Marco, Duke's former fight promoter

== Critical response ==
A review in The New York Times said that The Duke "trudges along with log-grade comedy and some silly situations".
