= Blues Busters =

1950 film directed by William Beaudine

- Theatrical poster
- Directed by: William Beaudine
- Written by: Charles Marion; Bert Lawrence
- Produced by: Jan Grippo
- Starring: Leo Gorcey; Huntz Hall; Gabriel Dell; David Gorcey; William Benedict
- Cinematography: Marcel LePicard
- Edited by: William Austin
- Music by: Edward J. Kay
- Distributed by: Monogram Pictures
- Release date: October 29, 1950
- Running time: 67 minutes
- Country: United States
- Language: English

Blues Busters is a 1950 American comedy film directed by William Beaudine and starring the Bowery Boys. The film was released on October 29, 1950, by Monogram Pictures and is the 20th film in the series.

== Plot ==
Sach develops an uncanny ability to sing after having his tonsils removed, and Slip tries to get him hired at a neighboring nightclub, the Rio Cabana. Rebuffed but undaunted, Slip convinces Louie to convert his sweet shop into a nightclub, Louie's Bowery Palace.

Sach's singing makes him a star, and business is booming. Rick Martin, the owner of the rival club, sends his lady friend Lola to secure Sach's signature on a contract, using the pretense that she is asking for his autograph. Rick then pursues the Bowery Palace's other star, Sally Dolan. Sally informs Lola about Rick's intentions, and the angry Lola agrees to testify that Sach's signature was just an autograph and not a signed contract. Louie's club reopens triumphantly, but Sach can no longer sing—his family doctor removed the "tickle in his throat".

== Cast ==
=== The Bowery Boys ===
- Leo Gorcey as Terrance Aloysius "Slip" Mahoney
- Huntz Hall as Horace Debussy "Sach" Jones
- Gabriel Dell as Gabe Moreno
- William Benedict as Whitey
- David Gorcey as Chuck
- Buddy Gorman as Butch

=== Supporting cast ===
- Adele Jergens as Lola Stanton
- Bernard Gorcey as Louie Dumbrowski
- Craig Stevens as Rick Martin
- Phyllis Coates as Sally Dolan
- Paul Bryar as Mobster
- William (Sailor) Vincent as Mobster
- Virginia Herrick (uncredited)

== Production ==
The working title of the film was The Bowery Thrush. It is the last Bowery Boys film with Gabriel Dell, who left the series in 1950 to pursue a career on stage and in television. Co-stars Buddy Gorman and Billy Benedict left the following year. Blues Busters was incidentally the last film Frankie Darro made for Monogram; he had starred or co-starred in Monogram features since 1938, and in Blues Busters he can be seen as the stuntman doubling for Leo Gorcey, getting thrown out of the Rio Cabana nightclub.

According to the studio's press releases, Leo Gorcey opened his own nightclub in California, which he called "The Munch".

== Home media ==
The film was released twice on home media, first on VHS by Warner Bros. on September 1, 1998, and then by Warner Archives, which released the film on made-to-order DVD in the United States as part of The Bowery Boys, Volume One collection on November 23, 2012.

== Soundtrack ==
- "Wasn't It You?"
  - Written by Ben Raleigh and Bernie Wayne
  - Played on a radio and sung by Huntz Hall (dubbed by John Laurenz)
- "Joshua Fit the Battle of Jericho"
  - Traditional spiritual
  - Sung by Adele Jergens in a nightclub (dubbed by Gloria Wood)
- "Bluebirds Keep Singin' in the Rain"
  - Written by Johnny Lange and Eliot Daniel
  - Published by Bulls Eye Music Inc. (ASCAP)
  - Played on piano by Gabriel Dell
  - Sung by Huntz Hall (dubbed by John Laurenz)
  - Reprised by Huntz Hall in the nightclub (dubbed by John Laurenz)
- "Let's Have a Heart to Heart Talk"
  - Written by Billy Austin, Edward Brandt and Paul Landers
  - Played on piano by Gabriel Dell
  - Sung by Huntz Hall (dubbed by John Laurenz)
  - Reprised by Huntz Hall in the nightclub (dubbed by John Laurenz)
- "You Walk By"
  - Written by Ben Raleigh and Bernie Wayne
  - Played by the orchestra with Gabriel Dell on piano
  - Sung by Huntz Hall (dubbed by John Laurenz)
- "Better Be Lookin' Out for Love"
  - Written by Ralph Wolf and Johnny Lange
  - Sung by Adele Jergens in a nightclub (dubbed by Gloria Wood)
- "Swanee River"
  - Written by Stephen Foster (as Stephen Collins Foster)
  - Jazzy version played by Gabriel Dell on piano
  - Danced to by William 'Billy' Benedict, David Gorcey and Buddy Gorman
- "Dixie's Lan"
  - Written by Daniel Decatur Emmett
  - Sung by Leo Gorcey

According to a Hollywood Reporter news item, singer Bob Carroll was the singing double for Huntz Hall, but some reviews credit the voice as that of John Laurenz.

Preceded by Triple Trouble; 1950	'The Bowery Boys' films 1946-1958	Succeeded by Bowery Battalion; 1951
