= Phyllis Coates =

American actress (1927–2023)

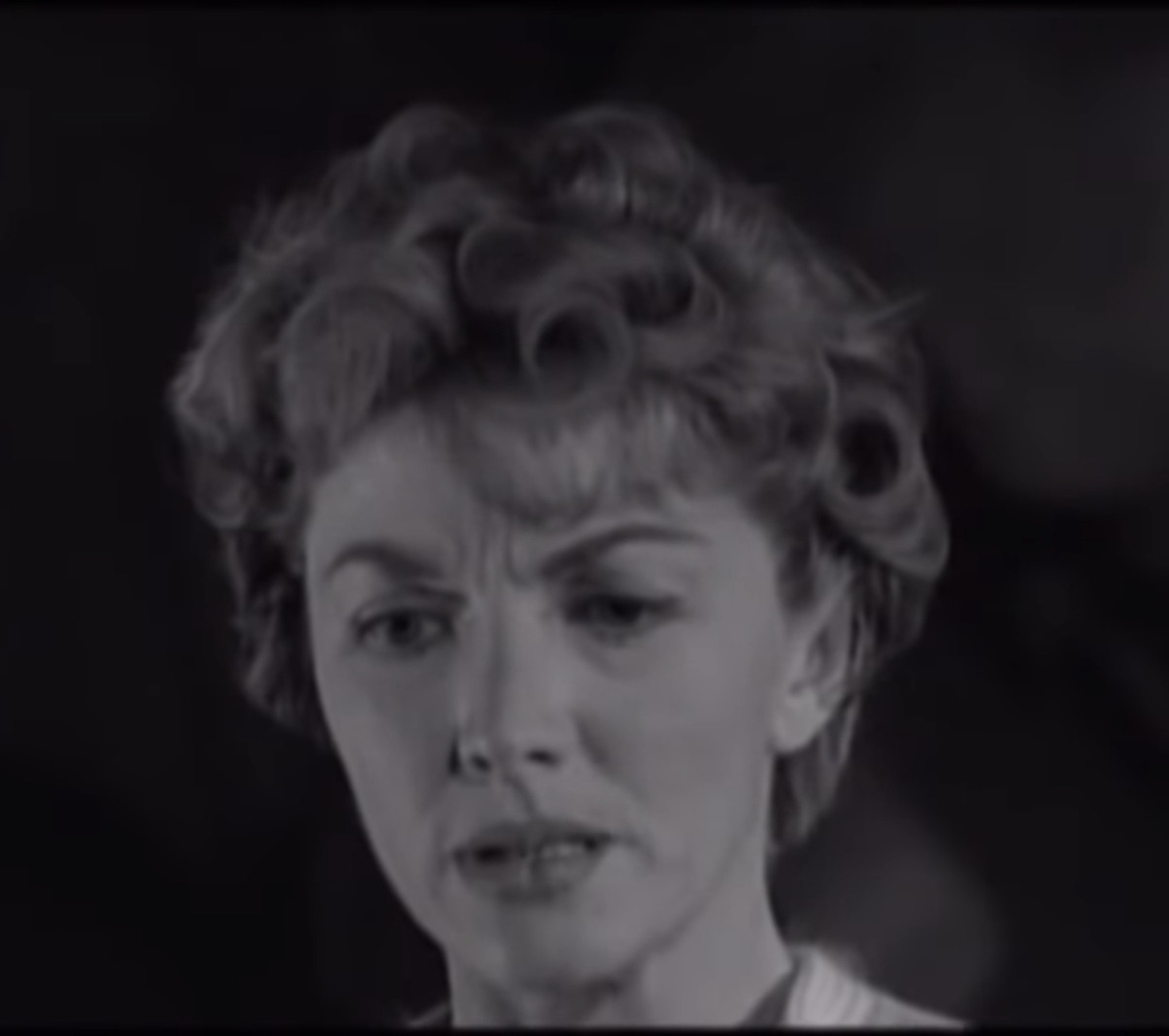
- Coates in The Incredible Petrified World (1959)
- Born: Gypsie Ann Evarts Stell; January 15, 1927; Wichita Falls, Texas, U.S.
- Died: October 11, 2023 (aged 96); Los Angeles, California, U.S.
- Other name: Gypsy Stell
- Education: Los Angeles City College
- Occupation: Actress
- Years active: 1944–1996
- Spouses: Richard L. Bare (m. 1948; div. 1949) Robert Nelms (m. 1950; div. 1953) Norman Tokar (m. 1955; div. 1956) Howard Irving Press (m. 1962; div. 1986)
- Children: 3

Phyllis Coates (born Gypsie Ann Evarts Stell; January 15, 1927 – October 11, 2023) was an American actress with a career spanning over fifty years. She was best known for her portrayal of reporter Lois Lane in the 1951 film Superman and the Mole Men and in the first season of the television series Adventures of Superman.

== Early life ==
Gypsie Ann Evarts Stell was born on January 15, 1927, in Wichita Falls, Texas. Coates was the daughter of William Robert Rush Stell and Lorraine "Luzzie" Jack Teel. After graduating from Odessa High School, she moved to Los Angeles with her mother. Coates attended (as Gypsy Stell) Los Angeles City College.

== Career ==
=== Stage ===
Originally billed under her birth name as Gypsy Stell, Coates was discovered in a Hollywood and Vine restaurant by vaudeville comedian Ken Murray, from whom she learned comic timing. She subsequently appeared as a dancer and a comedienne in skits for ten months in Blackouts, his "racy" (mildly risqué) variety show. She later performed as one of Earl Carroll's showgirls at his Earl Carroll Theatre. In 1946, she toured with a USO production of Anything Goes.

=== Film ===
On July 13, 1944, aged 17, she began to work with 20th Century Fox, after receiving a seven year contract with option.

Coates co-starred with George O'Hanlon as the title character's wife in the studio's Joe McDoakes short-subject comedies. She acted in film serials, including Jungle Drums of Africa (1953), Gunfighters of the Northwest (1953), and Panther Girl of the Kongo (1955). Her film career also included roles in Girls in Prison (1956), I Was a Teenage Frankenstein (1957), Blood Arrow (1958), Cattle Empire (1958), The Incredible Petrified World (1959), The Baby Maker (1970) and Goodnight, Sweet Marilyn (1989).

=== Television ===
In 1952, Coates guest-starred in "How Death Valley Got Its Name", the first episode of the anthology series Death Valley Days. She appeared in the 1954 Death Valley Days episode "The Light on the Mountain". Coates was cast as the widowed Mary in the 1959 episode, "One in a Hundred". In a 1964 episode, "The Left Hand Is Damned", she portrayed the kind-hearted saloon singer Dora Hand of Dodge City, Kansas.

Coates was cast in The Lone Ranger in 1953 in "Stage to Estacado" and "The Perfect Crime", and in 1955 in "The Woman in the White Mask". She was cast in 1955 as Madge in the CBS sitcom Professional Father. In 1955, Coates portrayed Medora De Mores in the two-part episode "King of the Dakotas" of the NBC western anthology series Frontier. In 1955, Coates portrayed teacher Miss Vernon in the season 2 episode of Lassie (Jeff's Collie era) entitled "The School". In 1956, she was cast in the episode "God in the Street" of another anthology series, Crossroads, based on the lives of American clergymen. That same year, Coates appeared in a second religious drama, This Is the Life, as Betty in the episode "I Killed Lieutenant Hartwell". She was also cast in 1956 as Marge in the episode "Web Feet" of the military drama Navy Log. She guest-starred in David Janssen's crime drama Richard Diamond, Private Detective.

In 1958, Coates played the mother, Clarissa Holliday, in all thirty-nine episodes of the 1958–1959 situation comedy, This Is Alice. She made guest appearances in three episodes of Perry Mason: Norma Carter in "The Case of the Black-Eyed Blonde" in 1958, "The Case of the Cowardly Lion" in 1961, and in "The Case of the Ice-Cold Hands" in 1964. In 1961, Coates was cast as Elizabeth Gwynn in the episode "The Little Fishes" on CBS's Rawhide. Coates guest-starred as well on three episodes of Gunsmoke between 1958 and 1964.

=== Lois Lane ===
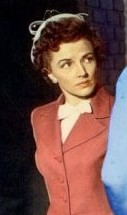
Coates as Lois Lane in Superman and the Mole Men (1951)

Coates played Lois Lane in the first season of Adventures of Superman. Noel Neill, who had played Lois Lane in two Columbia Superman serials, in 1948 and 1950, replaced Coates, who was not available for the second season. With the death of Noel Neill on July 3, 2016, Coates became the last surviving regular cast member from the Adventures of Superman TV series until her own death on October 11, 2023.

Coates freelanced steadily, appearing in numerous low-budget features, many of them westerns, as well as serials and a steady stream of TV appearances, both as a regular in several series and as a guest cast member in others. All this was in addition to the "McDoakes" shorts, in which she continued to appear until Warner Brothers discontinued the series in 1956. Arguably, her best-remembered films of the 1950s—perhaps owing to their being those in which she has a substantial role, and being among the few that had been preserved on home video—are Blues Busters with The Bowery Boys (in which she has a musical number); Panther Girl of the Kongo, a jungle serial in which she starred; Superman and the Mole Men; and I Was a Teenage Frankenstein.

=== Later years ===
In the 1960s, when it became clear that Adventures of Superman would continue to enjoy great popularity in syndicated reruns, far beyond the end of its production in 1957, Coates—like many of the other supporting cast members such as Jack Larson ("Jimmy Olsen")—tried to distance herself from the Superman series, fearing it might limit her opportunities. By the mid 1960s, however, she had settled into a comfortable semi-retirement as a wife and homemaker after marrying Los Angeles family physician Howard Press in 1962. She resumed her career after their divorce in 1986, but in the period immediately before that divorce, her film and television appearances were infrequent. One notable role was that of the mother of the female lead in the 1970 film The Baby Maker, directed by James Bridges, who coincidentally was Jack Larson's life-partner.

Coates agreed to appear as Lois's mother in the first season finale of the 1990s television series Lois & Clark: The New Adventures of Superman. Noel Neill, who also played Lois Lane in film and TV series, had already been Lois's mother in the 1978 film Superman.

== Personal life and death ==
Coates married director Richard L. Bare in 1948. They divorced in January 1949. She married jazz pianist Robert Nelms in 1950, gave birth to a daughter, and divorced in 1953. She was married and divorced four times.

Coates died on October 11, 2023, at the Motion Picture & Television Country House and Hospital in Woodland Hills. She was 96.

== Filmography ==
- So You Want to Be in Politics (1948, short) as Alice McDoakes (uncredited)
- Smart Girls Don't Talk (1948) as Cigarette Girl (uncredited)
- So You Want to Be on the Radio (1948, short) as Mrs. Alice McDoakes / Radio Voice (uncredited)
- So You Want to Be a Baby Sitter (1949, short) as Alice McDoakes (uncredited)
- Your Show Time (1949, TV series)
- So You Want to Be Popular (1949, short) as Office Secretary (uncredited)
- A Kiss in the Dark (1949) as Mrs. Hale (uncredited)
- Look for the Silver Lining (1949) as Rosie (uncredited)
- So You Want to Be a Muscle Man (1949, short) as Alice McDoakes (uncredited)
- So You're Having In-Law Trouble (1949, short) as Alice McDoakes (uncredited)
- The House Across the Street (1949) as Gorgeous (uncredited)
- So You Want to Get Rich Quick (1949, short) as Alice McDoakes (uncredited)
- My Foolish Heart (1949) as College Girl on Phone (uncredited)
- So You Want to Throw a Party (1950, short) as Alice McDoakes (uncredited)
- So You Think You're Not Guilty (1950, short) as Alice McDoakes (uncredited)
- So You Want to Hold Your Husband (1950, short) as Alice McDoakes / Baby McDoakes (uncredited)
- So You Want to Move (1950, short) as Alice McDoakes (uncredited)
- My Blue Heaven (1950) as Party Girl (uncredited)
- So You Want a Raise (1950, short) as Alice McDoakes (uncredited)
- Blues Busters (1950) as Sally Dolan
- Outlaws of Texas (1950) as Anne Moore
- The Cisco Kid (1950–1951, TV series) as Marge Lacey / Miss Lacey / JoAnn Doran
- Valentino (1951) as Universal Studios Casting Clerk (uncredited)
- Man from Sonora (1951) as Cinthy Allison
- Canyon Raiders (1951) as Alice Long
- So You Want to Be a Cowboy (1951, short) as Alice McDoakes / Cindy Lou (uncredited)
- Stars Over Hollywood (1951, TV series)
- Nevada Badmen (1951) as Carol Bannon
- So You Want to Be a Paper Hanger (1951, short) as Alice McDoakes (uncredited)
- So You Want to Buy a Used Car (1951, short) as Alice McDoakes (uncredited)
- Oklahoma Justice (1951) as Goldie Vaughn
- So You Want to Be a Bachelor (1951, short) as Alice Peckinpah McDoakes (uncredited)
- So You Want to Be a Plumber (1951, short) as Alice McDoakes (uncredited)
- Superman and the Mole Men (1951) as Lois Lane
- The Longhorn (1951) as Gail
- Stage to Blue River (1951) as Joyce Westbrook
- The Sun Was Setting (1951, TV short) as Rene
- So You Want to Get It Wholesale (1952, short) as Alice McDoakes (uncredited)
- The Gunman (1952) as Anita Forester
- Racket Squad (1952, TV series)
- So You Want to Go to a Convention (1952, short) as Alice McDoakes (uncredited)
- So You Never Tell a Lie (1952, short) as Alice McDoakes (uncredited)
- Fargo (1952) as Kathy MacKenzie
- Canyon Ambush (1952) as Marian Gaylord
- Eagles of the Fleet (1952) as Dorothy Collier
- So You Want to Wear the Pants (1952, short) as Alice McDoakes (uncredited)
- Wyoming Roundup (1952) as Terry Howard
- Invasion, U.S.A. (1952) as Mrs. Mulfory
- The Maverick (1952) as Della Watson
- Schlitz Playhouse (1952, TV series)
- The Range Rider (1952, TV series) as Doris Burton / Jane Tracy
- The Files of Jeffrey Jones (1952, TV series)
- Scorching Fury (1952) as Mrs. Penn, woman on sidewalk
- Craig Kennedy, Criminologist (1952, TV series) as Natalie Larkin
- Adventures of Superman (1952–1953, TV series) as Lois Lane
- Death Valley Days (1952–1964, TV series) as Dora Hand / Edna Wiley / Lois Bouquette / Mary / Annie Stewart / Margie McMahon / Virginia Arcane
- Jungle Drums of Africa (1953, serial) as Carol Bryant
- Marshal of Cedar Rock (1953) as Martha Clark
- She's Back on Broadway (1953) as Blonde (uncredited)
- Perils of the Jungle (1953) as Jo Carter
- Ramar of the Jungle (1953, TV series) as Donna Sharp
- So You Want a Television Set (1953, short) as Alice McDoakes (uncredited)
- Summer Theatre (1953, TV series) as Marge Minter
- I'm the Law (1953, TV series)
- So You Love Your Dog (1953, short) as Alice McDoakes (uncredited)
- Topeka (1953) as Marian Harrison
- Here Come the Girls (1953) as Chorus Girl (uncredited)
- El Paso Stampede (1953) as Alice Clark
- The Red Skelton Hour (1953, TV series) as Supporting Sketch Player
- So You Think You Can't Sleep (1953, short) as Alice McDoakes (uncredited)
- Your Jeweler's Showcase (1953, TV series) as Betty Tucker
- The Abbott and Costello Show (1953, TV series) as Millie Montrose
- So You Want to Be an Heir (1953, short) as Alice McDoakes (uncredited)
- Terry and the Pirates (1953, TV series) as Georgia Pettigrew
- The Lone Ranger (1953–1955, TV series) as Jane Johnson / Naomi Courtwright / Ann Wyman
- Crown Theatre with Gloria Swanson (1954, TV series)
- So You're Having Neighbor Trouble (1954, short) as Alice McDoakes (uncredited)
- Gunfighters of the Northwest (1954) as Rita Carville
- The Adventures of Kit Carson (1954, TV series) as Jane Sanders
- The Duke (1954, TV series) as Gloria
- Public Defender (1954, TV series) as Amberlee Tolliver
- It's a Great Life (1954–1956, TV series) as Lola Denton / Ann
- General Electric Theater (1954–1958, TV series) as Heather
- Panther Girl of the Kongo (1955) as Jean Evans
- Professional Father (1955, TV series) as Nurse Madge Allen
- Topper (1955, TV series) as Queen
- Cavalcade of America (1955, TV series) as Barbara Leland
- The Millionaire (1955, TV series) as Alice Sands
- Willy (1955, TV series) as Betty Estrada
- Stage 7 (1955, TV series) as Alice / Kay Murray
- Science Fiction Theatre (1955, TV series) as Karen Sheldon
- Lassie (1955, TV series) as Miss Vernon
- The Great Gildersleeve (1955, TV series) as Sally Fuller
- Frontier (1955, TV series) as Medora De More
- Western Union (1955, TV pilot) as Nancy Carnes
- TV Reader's Digest (1955–1956, TV series) as Nancy / Mother
- Navy Log (1956, TV series) as Marge
- Four Star Theatre (1956, TV series) as Marsha
- So You Want to Be Pretty (1956, short) as Alice McDoakes aka Cynthia (uncredited)
- Chevron Hall of Stars (1956, TV series) as Mary
- So You Want to Play the Piano (1956, short) as Alice McDoakes (uncredited)
- Crossroads (1956, TV series)
- So Your Wife Wants to Work (1956, short) as Alice McDoakes (uncredited)
- Girls in Prison (1956) as Dorothy
- Walt Disney's Wonderful World of Color (1956, TV series) as Mrs. Martin
- God Is in the Streets (1956, short)
- This Is the Life (1956, TV series)
- Chicago Confidential (1957) as Helen Fremont (uncredited)
- Leave It to Beaver (1957, TV series) as Betty Donaldson
- I Was a Teenage Frankenstein (1957) as Margaret
- The Sheriff of Cochise (1958, TV series) as Vera Watson
- Blood Arrow (1958) as Bess Johnson
- Richard Diamond, Private Detective (1958, TV series) as Monica Freeborn
- Cattle Empire (1958) as Janice Hamilton
- This Is Alice (1958, TV series) as Clarissa Holliday
- Tales of Wells Fargo (1958–1961, TV series)
- Gunsmoke (1958–1964, TV series) as Edna / Rose Kinney / Hattie Kelly
- Perry Mason (1958–1964, TV series) as Inez Fremont / Frieda Crawson / Norma Carter
- Westinghouse Desilu Playhouse (1959, TV series) as Belle
- Black Saddle (1959, TV series) as Maggie
- Lux Playhouse (1959, TV series) as Ellen Packer
- The Incredible Petrified World (1959) as Dale Marshall
- Hennesey (1959, TV series) as Dr. Patricia Granger
- Rawhide (1959–1961, TV series) – Nora Sage ("Incident of the Judas Trap"); Elizabeth Gwynn ("The Little Fishes")
- The Untouchables (1959–1962, TV series) as Angela Lamberto / Ellie Morley / Renee Sullivan
- The DuPont Show with June Allyson (1960, TV series) as Penny
- Hawaiian Eye (1960, TV series) as Laura Seldon
- The Best of the Post (1960, TV series) as Mollie
- Gunslinger (1961, TV series) as Teresa Perez
- The Patty Duke Show (1963–1964, TV series) as Secretary
- The Virginian (1964, TV series) as Mrs. Marden
- Gunsmoke (1964, TV series) as Edna
- Slattery's People (1964, TV series) as Helen Mayfield
- Thompson's Ghost (1966, TV movie) as Milly Thompson
- Summer Fun (1966, TV series) as Milly Thompson
- The Baby Maker (1970) as Tish's Mother
- Whisper Kill (1988, TV movie)
- Kiss Shot (1989, TV movie)
- Goodnight, Sweet Marilyn (1989) as Gladys Pearl Baker
- Midnight Caller (1991, TV series) as Meredith Gaynor
- Mrs. Lambert Remembers Love (1991, TV movie) as Katherine
- Lois & Clark: The New Adventures of Superman (1994, TV series) as Ellen Lane
- Dr. Quinn, Medicine Woman (1994, TV series) as Mrs. Howard
- Hollywood: The Movie (1996, video) as Old Dora (final appearance)
