= The Last Express (film) =

1938 film by Otis Garrett

- Theatrical release poster
- Directed by: Otis Garrett
- Screenplay by: Edmund Hartmann
- Based on: The Last Express by Baynard Kendrick
- Produced by: Irving Starr
- Starring: Kent Taylor; Dorothea Kent; Don Brodie; Paul Hurst; Addison Richards; Greta Granstedt; Robert Emmett Keane; J. Farrell MacDonald
- Cinematography: Stanley Cortez
- Edited by: Maurice Wright
- Production companies: Crime Club Productions, Inc.
- Distributed by: Universal Pictures
- Release dates: October 12, 1938 (New York); October 28, 1938 (United States)
- Running time: 63 minutes
- Country: United States
- Language: English

The Last Express is a 1938 American mystery film directed by Otis Garrett and written by Edmund Hartmann. It is based on the 1937 novel The Last Express by Baynard Kendrick. The film stars Kent Taylor, Dorothea Kent, Don Brodie, Paul Hurst, Addison Richards, Greta Granstedt, Robert Emmett Keane and J. Farrell MacDonald. The film was released on October 28, 1938, by Universal Pictures.

== Cast ==
- Kent Taylor as Duncan MacLain
- Dorothea Kent as Amy Arden
- Don Brodie as Spud Savage
- Paul Hurst as Al Springer
- Addison Richards as Frank Hoefle
- Greta Granstedt as Gladys Hewitt
- Robert Emmett Keane as Howard Hewitt
- J. Farrell MacDonald as William Barton
- Edward Raquello as Paul Zarinka
- Al Shaw as Shane
- Sam Lee as Trilby
- Charles Trowbridge as District Attorney Meredith
- Al Hill as Marshall
- Frances Robinson as Gracie
- John Miller as Eddie Miller
- Henry Brandon as Pinky

== Production ==
In 1937, Universal Pictures made a deal with the Crime Club, who were publishers of whodunnits. Over the next few years Universal released several mystery films in the series. The Last Express was one of the entries in the series.

== Release ==
The Last Express opened in New York in the week of October 12, 1938. It was released further on October 28, 1938.

== Reception ==
Archer Winsten of the New York Post found the film to be "unusually baffling".
