= Triple Trouble (1950 film) =

1950 film by Jean Yarbrough

- Directed by: Jean Yarbrough
- Written by: Charles Marion; Bert Lawrence
- Produced by: Jan Grippo
- Starring: Leo Gorcey; Huntz Hall; Gabriel Dell; David Gorcey; William Benedict
- Cinematography: Marcel LePicard
- Edited by: William Austin
- Music by: Edward J. Kay
- Distributed by: Monogram Pictures
- Release date: August 13, 1950
- Running time: 66 minutes
- Country: United States
- Language: English

Triple Trouble is a 1950 comedy film directed by Jean Yarbrough and starring the Bowery Boys. The film was released on August 13, 1950 by Monogram Pictures, and is the 19th film in the Bowery Boys series.

== Plot ==
When the boys are on their way home from a masquerade party when they hear noises in a warehouse and investigate. The warehouse is being robbed and the boys are captured by the police and wrongly convicted of robbery. Their lawyer Gabe is able to reduce the sentence to just probation, but Slip insists that he and Sach should accept jail time to determine who is behind the series of robberies in the neighborhood. He deduces that the instructions are being sent from inside the prison by a shortwave radio.

Upon entering the prison, Slip and Sach are mistaken for notorious criminals and befriend the masterminds behind the robberies. Whitey, who owns a shortwave radio, overhears the plans and informs Louie, who tells the police that his sweet shop will be robbed next. The cop does not believe him, but eventually Louie is able to persuade the warden of the prison when Whitey hears about a jailbreak attempt. The warden plans a sting operation and catches the gang behind the robberies, and the boys are exonerated.

== Cast ==
=== The Bowery Boys ===
- Leo Gorcey as Terrance Aloysius "Slip" Mahoney
- Huntz Hall as Horace Debussy "Sach" Jones
- William Benedict as Whitey
- David Gorcey as Chuck
- Buddy Gorman as Butch

=== Remaining cast ===
- Gabriel Dell as Gabe Moreno
- Bernard Gorcey as Louie Dumbrowski
- Richard Benedict as Skeets O'Neil
- G. Pat Collins as Bat Armstrong
- Lyn Thomas as Shirley O'Brien
- Joe Turkel as Benny the Blood
- Lyle Talbot as the guard

== Home media ==
Warner Archives released the film on made-to-order DVD in the United States as part of The Bowery Boys, Volume Four set on August 26, 2014.

Preceded by Lucky Losers; 1950	'The Bowery Boys' movies 1946-1958	Succeeded by Blues Busters; 1950
