= Andre Philippe =

American film and television actor (1927–2007)

- Philippe in 1954
- Born: Everett Cooper; November 3, 1927; The Bronx, New York, U.S.
- Died: April 29, 2007 (aged 79); Venice, California, U.S.
- Occupation: Actor
- Years active: 1959–1993

Andre Philippe (November 3, 1927 – April 29, 2007) was an American film and television actor. He was best known for playing the role of Mr. Everett Johns in the American drama television series Mr. Novak, and the role of Paul in Hawaiian Eye.

== Biography ==
Philippe was born Everett Cooper in The Bronx, New York. He served in World War II, and later went to Paris, where he sang in nightclubs and changed his name to Andre Philippe. His film and television career began in 1959 with the role of Paul in Hawaiian Eye. He then played the role of Mr. Everett Jones in the drama television series Mr. Novak from 1963 to 1965.

Philippe guest-starred in television programs including Get Smart, The Wild Wild West, Combat!, Magnum, P.I., Bonanza, The Man from U.N.C.L.E., That Girl, The Monkees, The Wackiest Ship in the Army, Medical Center and Charlie's Angels. He also co-starred and appeared in films such as The Scorpio Letters (1967), Bob & Carol & Ted & Alice (1969), Alex in Wonderland (1970), Invasion of the Bee Girls (1973), Black Belt Jones (1974, as "Don Steffano"), Harry and Tonto (1974), Goodbye, Norma Jean (1976), Oh, God! Book II (1980), Down and Out in Beverly Hills (1986), Goodnight, Sweet Marilyn (1989), Scenes from a Mall (1991) and The Pickle (1993).

Philippe died in April 2007 of heart failure in Venice, California, at the age of 79.
