= Gunfighters of the Northwest =

1954 film by Spencer Gordon Bennet, Charles S. Gould

- Directed by: Spencer Gordon Bennet (as Spencer G. Bennet); Charles S. Gould
- Screenplay by: Arthur Hoerl; Royal K. Cole; George H. Plympton
- Story by: Arthur Hoerl; Royal K. Cole; George H. Plympton
- Produced by: Sam Katzman
- Starring: Jock Mahoney; Clayton Moore; Phyllis Coates; Don C. Harvey
- Cinematography: William P. Whitley (as William Whitley)
- Edited by: Earl Turner
- Color process: Black and white
- Production company: Sam Katzman Productions
- Distributed by: Columbia Pictures
- Release date: April 15, 1954
- Running time: 315 minutes (15 episodes)
- Country: United States
- Language: English

Gunfighters of the Northwest is a 1954 American Western serial film directed by Spencer Gordon Bennet and Charles S. Gould and starring Jock Mahoney, Clayton Moore, Phyllis Coates, Don C. Harvey.

== Plot ==
White Horse Rebels, under the command of a mystery villain known only as The Leader, attempt to create an independent White Horse Republic in Canada's northwest. Funded by gold from the Marrow Mine, they attack Canadian settlements in the area. The North-West Mounted Police, represented primarily by hero Sgt. Ward and his sidekick Constable Nevin, discover The Leader's real identity. An added complication comes in the form of First Nations, Blackfeet driven into Canada from the United States, who attack both sides and whom the rebels attempt to use as scapegoats for their own attacks.

== Cast ==
- Jock Mahoney as Sgt. Joe Ward (as Jack Mahoney)
- Clayton Moore as Constable Bram Nevin
- Phyllis Coates as Rita Carville
- Don C. Harvey as Otis Green (as Don Harvey)
- Marshall Reed as Gale Lynch
- Rodd Redwing as Bear Tooth
- Lyle Talbot as Inspector Wheeler
- Tommy Farrell as Constable Arch Perry - Ch's 1-2
- Terry Frost as Wildfoot
- Lee Roberts as Arnold Reed - Ch's 1-2
- Joseph Allen as Fletcher Stone (as Joe Allen Jr.)
- Gregg Barton as Hank Bridger
- Chief Yowlachie as Chief Running Elk
- Pierce Lyden as Dakota

== Production ==
The entire filming of Gunfighters of the Northwest took place outdoors at Big Bear Lake, California, including a scene set in a cave that was filmed with lighting and backdrop to make it appear to be an internal shot. During filming, the cast and crew all lived at a nearby hotel.

The two heroic leads, Jock Mahoney and Clayton Moore, were injured during production. On the second day of shooting, Moore was thrown from his horse, landing unconscious on his back. He was not able to perform any rising scenes for a few days but could act in all the dramatic scenes. Mahoney was hurt on the same day, injuring a metatarsal in a fight scene, but he was able to walk and continue filming the next day.

Moore had been the Lone Ranger in the television series until being replaced by John Hart in 1952. Hart, who was dating female lead Phyllis Coates, visited the set. Following Moore's injury, Hart volunteered to stand in for Moore in several scenes.

== Chapter titles ==
1. A Trap for the Mounties
2. Indian War Drums
3. Between Two Fires
4. Midnight Raiders
5. Running the Gauntlet
6. Mounties at Bay
7. Plunge of Peril
8. Killer at Large
9. The Fighting Mounties
10. The Sergeant Gets His Man
11. The Fugitive Escapes
12. Stolen Gold
13. Perils of the Mounted Police
14. Surprise Attack
15. Trail's End

== See also ==
- List of American films of 1954
- List of film serials by year
- List of film serials by studio

| Preceded by The Great Adventures of Captain Kidd (1953) | Columbia Serial; Gunfighters of the Northwest (1954) | Succeeded by Riding with Buffalo Bill (1954) |
