= The Maverick =

1952 film by Thomas Carr

- Directed by: Thomas Carr
- Written by: Sidney Theil
- Produced by: Vincent M. Fennelly
- Starring: Wild Bill Elliott; Myron Healey; Phyllis Coates
- Cinematography: Ernest Miller
- Edited by: Sam Fields
- Music by: Raoul Kraushaar; Mort Glickman
- Production company: Silvermine Productions
- Distributed by: Allied Artists Pictures
- Release date: December 14, 1952
- Running time: 71 minutes
- Country: United States
- Language: English

The Maverick is a 1952 American Western film directed by Thomas Carr and starring Wild Bill Elliott, Myron Healey and Phyllis Coates.

== Cast ==
- Wild Bill Elliott as Lieutenant Pete Devlin
- Myron Healey as Sergeant Frick
- Phyllis Coates as Della Watson
- Richard Reeves as Frank Bullitt
- Terry Frost as Trooper Westman
- Rand Brooks as Trooper Barnham
- Russell Hicks as Colonel Hook
- Robert Bray as Corporal Johnson
- Florence Lake as Grandma Watson
- Gregg Barton as George Fane
- Denver Pyle as Bud Karnes
- Robert J. Wilke as Gang leader Massey
- Gene Roth as Fred Nixon
- Joel Allen as John Rowe

== Bibliography ==
- Michael G. Fitzgerald & Boyd Magers. Ladies of the Western: Interviews with Fifty-One More Actresses from the Silent Era to the Television Westerns of the 1950s and 1960s. McFarland, 2006.
