= Norman Steinberg =

American director, producer and screenwriter (1939–2023)

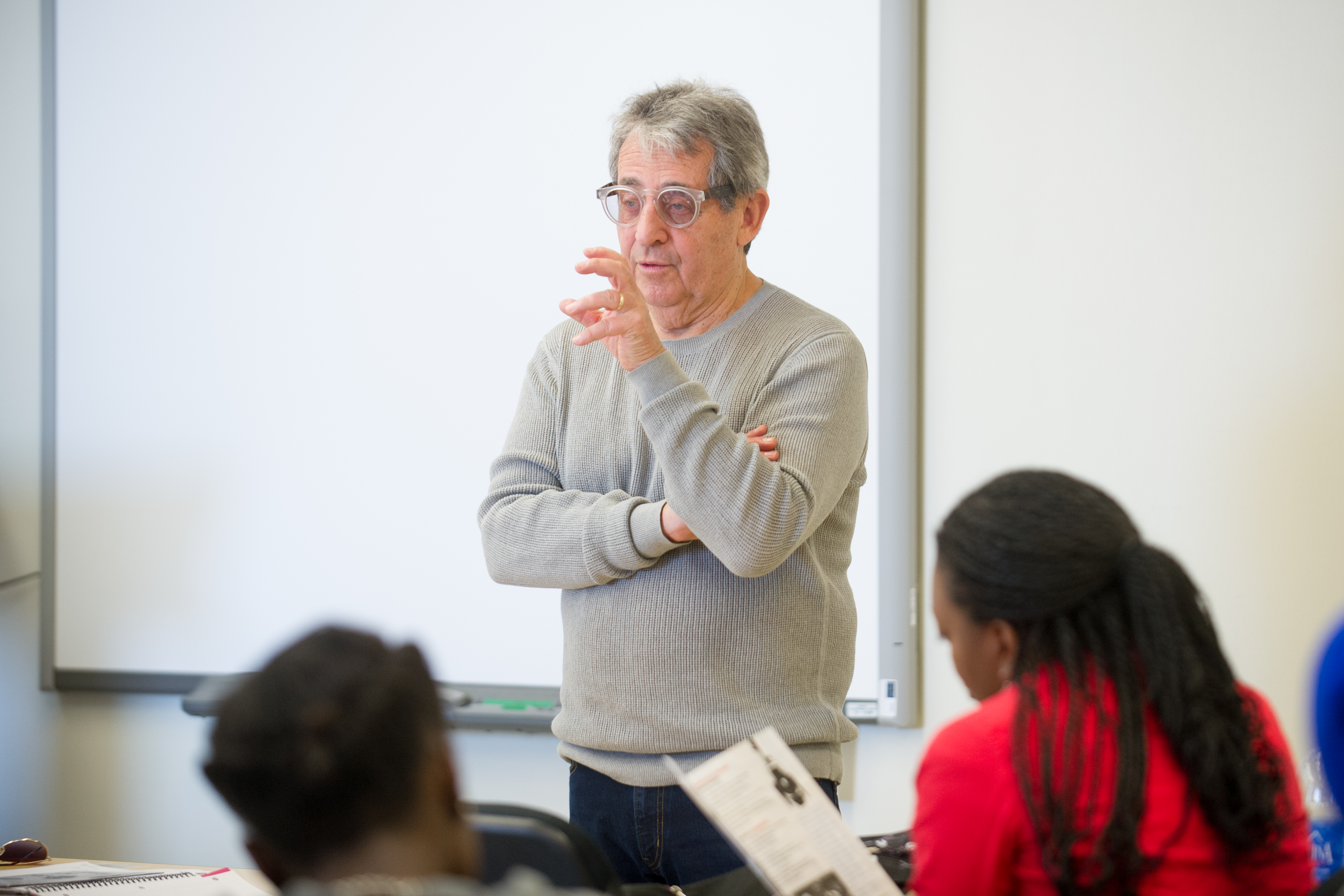
- Steinberg in 2015
- Born: June 6, 1939; Brooklyn, New York, U.S.
- Died: March 15, 2023 (aged 83); Hudson Valley, New York, U.S.
- Occupations: Director, producer, screenwriter
- Family: Terri Minsky (niece)

Norman Steinberg (June 6, 1939 – March 15, 2023) was an American television director, producer and screenwriter.

Steinberg was born in Brooklyn, New York, on June 6, 1939. He was a lawyer before starting writing. He wrote several projects with former dentist Alan Uger before the pair were hired by Mel Brooks as writers on his 1974 film Blazing Saddles. He co-scripted for the 1984 film Johnny Dangerously along with Harry Colomby, Jeff Harris and Bernie Kukoff.

Steinberg died in Hudson Valley, New York, on March 15, 2023, at the age of 83.

== Selected filmography ==
- Blazing Saddles (1974) (co-writer)
- Yes, Giorgio (1982) (co-writer)
- My Favorite Year (1982) (co-writer)
- Johnny Dangerously (1984) (story by)
- Wise Guys (1986) (co-writer)
- Funny About Love (1990) (co-writer)
