= Jeff Harris (writer) =

American television actor, producer and writer

- Born: Jeff Steve Harris; June 10, 1935; New York City, U.S.
- Died: February 2, 2004 (aged 68); East Hampton, New York, U.S.
- Education: New York's High School of Performing Arts
- Occupations: Television actor, producer, writer

Jeff Steve Harris (June 10, 1935 – February 2, 2004) was an American television actor, producer and screenwriter. He was the co-creator of the American television family sitcom Diff'rent Strokes, which he created with Bernie Kukoff.

Harris co-scripted the 1984 film Johnny Dangerously with Bernie Kukoff, Harry Colomby and Norman Steinberg. His other credits include, Roseanne, Love, American Style, Operation Petticoat, Detective School and The New Dick Van Dyke Show. He also appeared in two Broadway plays Winesburg, Ohio and Tall Story. Harris died in February 2004 of emphysema in his sleep, at his home in East Hampton, New York, at the age of 68.

== Filmography ==
=== Acting work ===
Year	Title	Role	Notes
1954	The Web		1 episode
1954	Pond's Theater	Young Snappy	1 episode
1954	Justice		1 episode
1954	Janet Dean, Registered Nurse		1 episode
1955	Appointment with Adventure	Danny	1 episode
1955	Star Tonight		1 episode
1955	Playwrights '56		1 episode
1956	The Edge of Night	Jenning Carlson	1 episode
1961	Naked City	Fred	1 episode

=== Producing work ===
Year	Title	Notes
1967	Pat Boone in Hollywood	Producer
1969–1970	Jimmy Durante Presents the Lennon Sisters	Producer – 13 episodes
1970	The Everly Brothers Show	Producer – 1 Episode
1971	The Val Doonican Show	Producer – 2 episodes
1973	A Salute to Humble Howard	Producer (TV Special)
1973	A Show Business Salute to Milton Berle	Producer (TV Special)
1974	Ma and Pa	Producer (TV Movie)
1974	ABC Funshine Saturday Sneak Peek	Producer (TV Movie)
1975–1976	Almost Anything Goes	Producer – 2 episodes
1975	Joe and Sons	Producer – 1 Episode
1976	Adventurizing with the Chopper	Executive Producer (TV Movie)
1977	McNamara's Band	Executive Producer (TV Movie)
1978	That Thing on ABC	Producer (TV Movie)
1978–1979	Operation Petticoat	Executive Producer – 9 episodes
1979	Detective School	Executive Producer – 13 episodes
1980	All-American Pie	Executive Producer (TV Movie)
1986	Dads	Executive Producer – 1 Episode
1988	Cadets	Executive Producer (TV Movie)
1989–1990	Roseanne	Executive Producer – 34 episodes

=== Writing work ===
Year	Title	Notes
1966	The Roger Miller Show	Writer – 1 Episode
1967	Las Vegas	Writer – 1 Episode
1967	First Annual All-Star Celebrity Softball Game	Writer (TV Special)
1968	Operation: Entertainment	Writer – 2 episodes
1969	The Glen Campbell Goodtime Hour	Writer – 3 episodes
1969–1970	Jimmy Durante Presents the Lennon Sisters	Writer – 13 episodes
1970	The Everly Brothers Show	Writer – 1 Episode
1971	The Val Doonican Show	Writer – 1 Episode
1973	A Touch of Grace	Writer – 1 Episode
1973	ABC Comedy News	Writer – 1 Episode
1973	Love, American Style	Writer – 1 Episode
1973	The New Dick Van Dyke Show	Writer – 1 Episode
1974	ABC Funshine Saturday Sneak Peek	Writer (TV Movie)
1975	Almost Anything Goes	Writer – 1 Episode
1976	Adventurizing with the Chopper	Writer (TV Movie)
1977	McNamara's Band	Creator/Writer (TV Movie)
1978	That Thing on ABC	Writer (TV Movie)
1978–1986	Diff'rent Strokes	Creator/Writer – 181 episodes
1978–1979	Operation Petticoat	Writer – 5 episodes
1979	Detective School	Writer – 9 episodes
1980	All-American Pie	Writer (TV Movie)
1984	Johnny Dangerously	Writer (Film)
1985	Comedy Factor	Writer – 1 Episode
1986–1987	Dads	Developer/Writer – 9 episodes
1988	Cadets	Writer (TV Movie)
