= Preston Hanson =

American actor (1921–2008)

- Hanson in an episode of Lock-Up (1961)
- Born: January 17, 1921; Cedar Rapids, Iowa, U.S.
- Died: February 12, 2008 (aged 87); Van Nuys, California, U.S.
- Education: Pasadena Junior College
- Occupation: Actor
- Years active: 1951–1994
- Spouse: Lorraine Johnson
- Children: 4

Preston Hanson (January 17, 1921 – February 12, 2008) was an American actor.

== Early years ==
Hanson was born Iowa and moved to California in 1940. He attended Pasadena Junior College.

== Military service ==
During World War II, Hanson few 65 attack missions as a combat pilot in Europe, for which he received the Air Medal and the Distinguished Flying Cross. He later became a major in the Air Force Reserve.

== Acting ==
Hanson appeared in over 30 TV series and movies over 40 years, including Dynasty, Gunsmoke, Dallas, Goodbye, Norma Jean, Action Jackson and The A-Team among others. His last credit was in the 1994 comedy Cops and Robbersons. His Broadway credits include Much Ado About Nothing (1952), Saint Joan (1951), and Billy Budd (1951).

== Later years ==
In 1964, Hanson ran for the Democratic nomination for Congress from the 27th District of California. At that time, he was a property manager. In 1966, he sought the Democratic nomination for the 42nd Assembly District of California's Legislature.

== Personal life ==
Hanson was married to the former Lorraine Johnson. They had four children.

== Filmography ==
Year	Title	Role	Notes
1953	Julius Caesar	Claudius	
1958	Sea Hunt	Operation Greenback	1 episode
1959	Operation Petticoat	Lt. Col. Simpson	Uncredited
1960	Cage of Evil	Tom Colton, Insurance Investigator	
1975	Half a House	Judge	
1976	Goodbye, Norma Jean	Hal James	
1981	The Loch Ness Horror	Colonel Laughton	
1988	Action Jackson	Master of Ceremonies	
1994	Cops and Robbersons	T-Men Announcer	(final film role)
