= Goodbye, Norma Jean =

- Directed by: Larry Buchanan
- Written by: Lynn Shubert; Larry Buchanan
- Produced by: Larry Buchanan
- Starring: Misty Rowe; Cotton Hill; Patch Mackenzie; Preston Hanson; Marty Zagon
- Music by: Joe Beck
- Production company: Austamerican Productions
- Distributed by: A. Sterling Gold, Ltd.
- Release date: 1976
- Running time: 95 minutes
- Country: United States
- Language: English

Goodbye, Norma Jean is a 1976 film by Larry Buchanan based on the life of Marilyn Monroe. Misty Rowe plays the title role.

== Cast ==
- Misty Rowe as Norma Jeane Baker
- Terence Locke as Ralph Johnson
- Patch Mackenzie as Ruth Latimer
- Preston Hanson as Hal James
- Marty Zagon as Irving Oblach
- Andre Philippe as Sam Dunn
- Adele Claire as Beverly
- Sal Ponti as Randy Palmer
- Paula Mitchell as Cynthia Palmer
- Jean Sarah Frost as Ethel
- Lilyan McBride as House Mother
- Burr Middleson as Sleazy Photographer
- Stuart Lancaster as George
- Ivy Bethune as Ruby Kirshner
- Robert Gribbon as Terry

== Reception ==
The film opened in a small number of American and Canadian cities in 1976. It attracted few notices from critics, all of which were negative. Jerry Oster of the New York Daily News gave the film half of a star and called it a "vulgar ripoff", adding that "Missy, who bears a startling resemblance to a department store mannikin—and acts no better—has been put through her paces by an unknown named Larry Buchanan, who produced, co-authored and directed this clap-trap, thus assuring continued anonymity." Vincent Canby of The New York Times called it "a terrible, witless, schlocky movie that Norma Jean Baker might have made in her desperation to be somebody. Misty Rowe, who looks a lot like Marilyn and may be desperate too, gives a pretty good imitation of the star." Jeanne Miller of the San Francisco Examiner called the film "a tawdry and repellent portrait of one of the screen's most alluring tragic heroines." Ed Blank of The Pittsburgh Press said that the film was "just a quick buck shy of terrible", "suggests a lot and shows almost nothing." George Anderson of the Pittsburgh Post-Gazette called it "a woefully inept little movie" that "paints another moustache on the death mask of Marilyn Monroe." Hal Crowther of the Buffalo Evening News praised Rowe's performance but called the film "deliberately sordid" and added that "the director, the screenwriters and the performers all seem to be operating in some tawdry movie-magazine world where every newspaper is the kind with a cover story on Liz and Dick. The music and the photography belong there too. If it's a conscious effect, it may be art of a kind."

Clyde Gilmour of the Toronto Star called it "another crummy movie about a real-life star of the past", and noted that "Miss Rowe is leggy enough and busty enough to conjure up a plausible physical likeness of her famous subject. She makes a fair stab at duplicating the well-remembered voice, breathy and little-girlish and somehow both sexy and innocent. But she overdoes Monroe's vulnerability again and again working up an Oscar-bid storm of heavy melodramatics by way of tipping us off that this voluptuous teenager has a sombre rendezvous with destiny. What's more the screenplay itself continually makes nonsense of all this. It does so by indicating that Norma Jean though sorely distressed by the utter beastliness of human males smilingly rebounds from each fresh humiliation. She's as good as new after every rape." Michael Walsh of The Province called it "a bloody awful movie". He continued by saying that "her story begins in Hollywood, circa 1941. So do the picture's problems. Director Buchanan has no idea how to evoke period. Although he packs his screen with period props, the costumes, hairstyles and language are all wrong. The final blow, though, is Joe Beck's music. It sounds just like every other cheapo sex film whose producers can't afford a studio orchestra. A piano, saxophone, bass, drums (The Big Band Sound, man, what's that?) and there will be enough jazzy noise on the soundtrack to cover over the footage that had to be shot silent. The only thing worse than the music is the acting." Martin Malina of the Montreal Star said that the film was "scarcely more than a screen adaptation of fan-mag material [that] might be watchable under a hair dryer."

The film fared no better among critics outside of the North American continent. Tim Radford of The Guardian wrote that "the film more or less begins with a rape, peaks on a lesbian seduction and fades out on an all too explicit reference to fellatio, leaving (as it were) a very nasty taste in the mouth." Romola Costantino of The Sun-Herald called the film "a shabby, unconvincing picture" that "has the kind of sloppy story line typical to cheap girly-pictures lots of pointless un-dressed-to-panties scenes, and a series of lecherous assaults' upon the heroine's virtue. Much of this kind of thing probably did happen, but here it is filmed in a tawdry and grubby way." Colin Bennett of The Age wrote that the movie, "monotonously plugging away at its one-track-mind notion of 1940s Hollywood as one giant casting couch [...] cheaply plots the rise and rise of Norma Jean Baker from Miss Whamo-Ammo beauty contestant to platinumed pouting star" with "not much else to commend it except Misty Rowe, who works hard, does a passable baby-voice and finally turns into a good facsimile of the actress as remembered on screen." He concluded his review by remarking that it "tells us no more than some fan mag or paperback which it often tends to resemble."
