= Dick Gautier =

American actor (1931–2017)

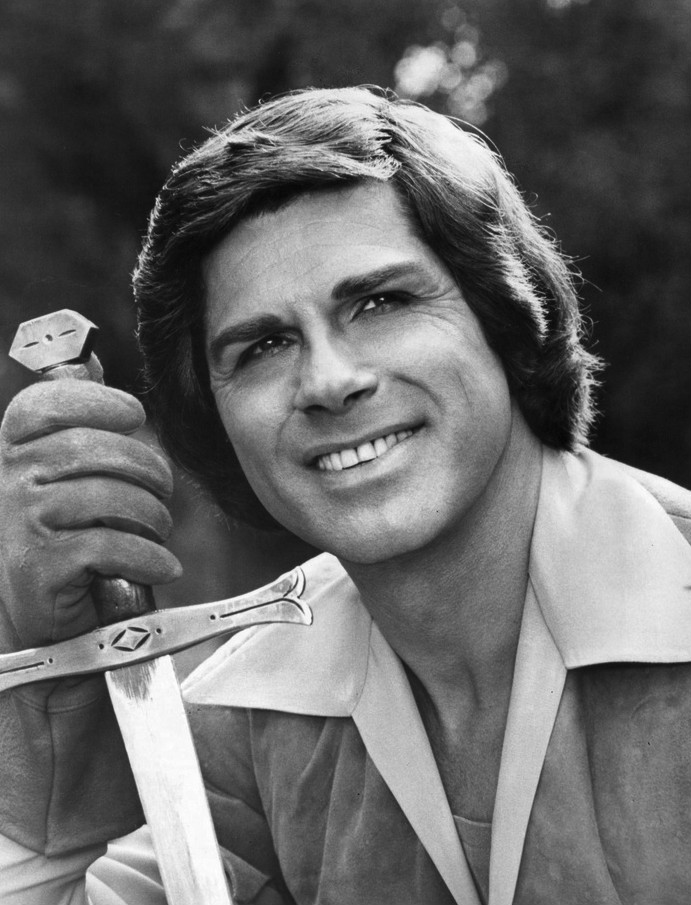
- Gautier as Robin Hood in When Things Were Rotten (1975)
- Born: Richard Gilbert Gautier; October 30, 1931; Culver City, California, U.S.
- Died: January 13, 2017 (aged 85); Arcadia, California, U.S.
- Occupations: Actor; comedian; caricaturist
- Years active: 1959–1999
- Spouses: Beverly J. Gerber (m. 1954; div. 19??); Barbara Stuart (m. 1967; div. 1979) Tess Hightower (m. 2003)
- Children: 3

Richard Gilbert Gautier (Go-tee-AY; October 30, 1931 – January 13, 2017) was an American actor. He was known for his television roles as Hymie the Robot in the television series Get Smart, and Robin Hood in the TV comedy series When Things Were Rotten, as well as for originating the role of Conrad Birdie in the Broadway musical Bye Bye Birdie.

== Career ==
Gautier started his career as a singer and a nightclub comic at the hungry i in San Francisco. He joined ASCAP in 1959 after serving in the United States Navy. In 1960, he portrayed fictional rock 'n roll star Conrad Birdie in the original Broadway theatre production of Bye Bye Birdie, receiving a Tony Award nomination for his performance. He would later appear with two of his Birdie stars in two films: with Kay Medford in Ensign Pulver in 1964, and with Dick Van Dyke in Divorce American Style in 1967.

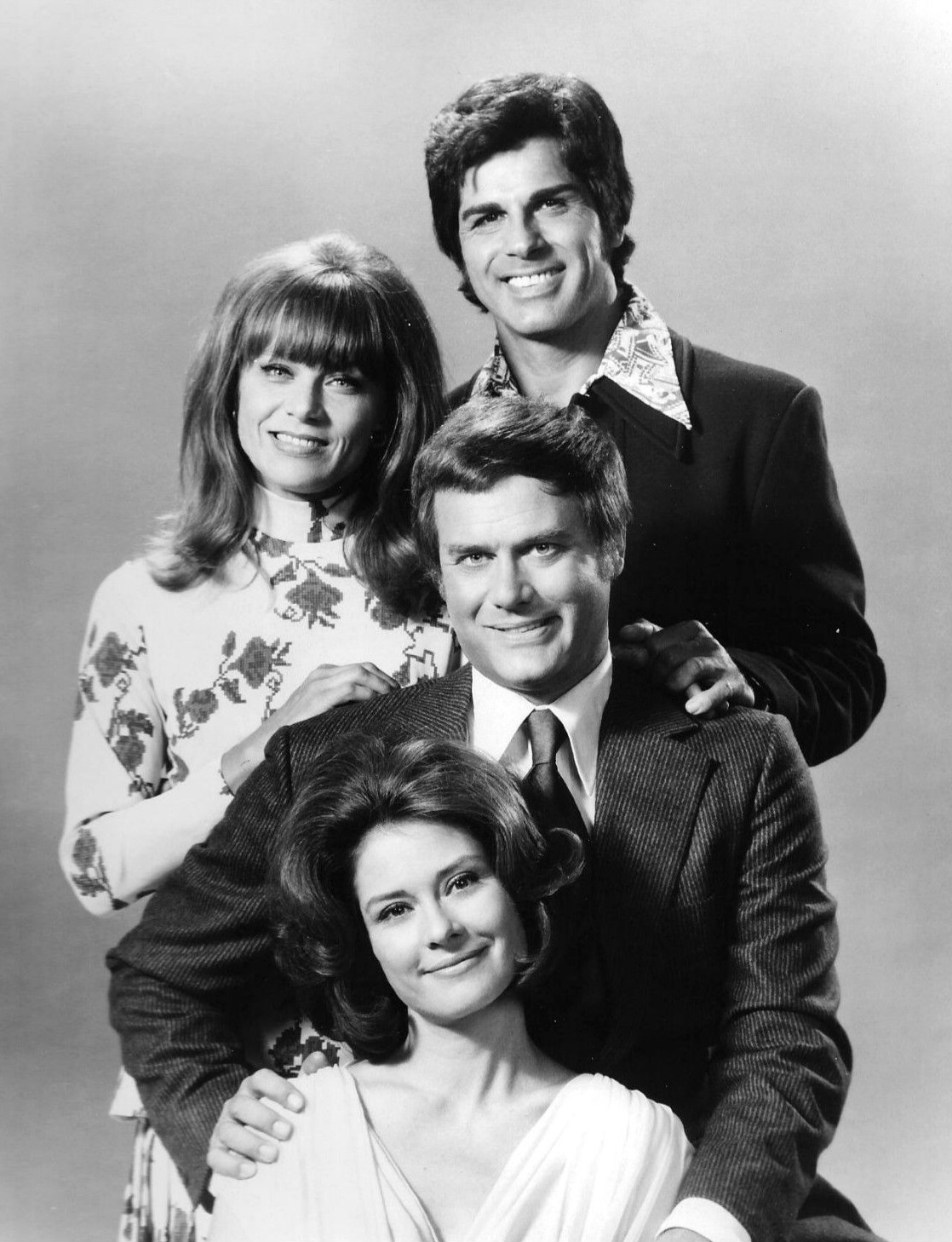
From the TV series Here We Go Again (1973). From top: Dick Gautier, Nita Talbot, Larry Hagman and Diane Baker.

=== Game show panelist ===
During the 1970s and 1980s, Gautier was a frequent game show panelist. He appeared on Match Game; Family Feud; Tattletales; Showoffs; You Don't Say!; Liar's Club; Password Plus; Body Language; Super Password; Win, Lose or Draw; Whew!; and the TV version of Can You Top This?

=== Batman ===
In 1973, when Burt Ward and Yvonne Craig reprised their Batman roles (as Robin and Batgirl, respectively) for a TV public service announcement about equal pay for women, Adam West, who was trying to distance himself from the Batman role at the time, declined to participate. Gautier filled in for West as Batman on this occasion.

=== Voice-over roles ===
Gautier performed several voice-over roles in animation, including Rodimus Prime in the third season of The Transformers animated series from 1986 to 1987, as well as Serpentor in the G.I. Joe series, Louis from the 1986 cartoon Foofur, Spike the Dog in Tom & Jerry Kids, some additional voices in Hanna-Barbera's The New Yogi Bear Show, Wooly Smurf in The Smurfs, and several voices for Inhumanoids, including Crygen and Pyre and their combined form, Magnakor.

=== Celebrity caricatures ===
Gautier was known for his caricatures of celebrities and wrote several instructional books on caricature, drawing, and cartooning.

== Personal life and death ==
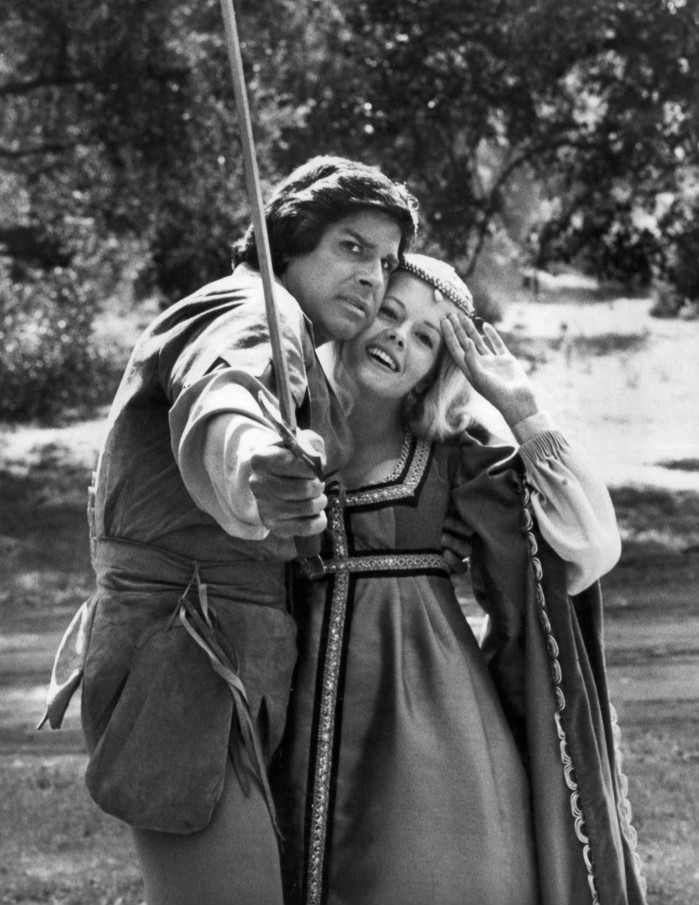
Gautier and Misty Rowe in When Things Were Rotten, 1975

Richard Gilbert Gautier was born in Culver City, California, on October 30, 1931. His father was a grip and his mother was a costume seamstress.

Gautier was first married to Beverly J. Gerber; the marriage ended in divorce after they had three children together. His second wife was actress Barbara Stuart, and his final marriage was to Tess Hightower, a psychologist.

His son Randy, nicknamed Rand, had both a brief stint in pornography under the name Austin Moore, and in 1995 he stole a videotape from the home of Tommy Lee and Pamela Anderson, containing footage they had filmed of themselves having sex while on vacation. Rand, along with a distributor, released it on the Internet, and it became one of the first widespread celebrity sex tapes.

Gautier died from pneumonia on January 13, 2017, at an assisted living facility in Arcadia, California, following a long illness.

== Filmography ==
Year	Title	Role	Notes
1964	Ensign Pulver	Stefanowski	
1965	Gidget	Mark Hillman	
1965–1970	Get Smart	Hymie the Robot	6 episodes
1966	Bewitched	Monsieur Aubert	Episode: “Samantha the Dressmaker”; Season 2, Episode 24
1967	Mr. Terrific	Hal Walters	
1967	Divorce American Style	Larry Strickland	
1968	Maryjane	Bearded prisoner	Uncredited/Writer
1969	The Flying Nun	Bruce	2 episodes (two-part story arc) – "The Great Casino Robbery" Season 2, Episodes 16 & 17
1972	Wild in the Sky	Diver	Writer and producer
1973	The Mary Tyler Moore Show	Ed Cavanaugh	Episode: "Hi There, Sports Fans"; Season 4, Episode 5
1973	Banacek	Mario Fratelli	Episode: "The Three Million Dollar Piracy"; Season 2, Episode 3
1974	Hawkins	Episode: "Murder in the Slave Trade"; Season 1, Episode 5	
1974	Kolchak: The Night Stalker	Mel Tarter	Episode: "The Werewolf"; Season 1, Episode 5
1974	The Rockford Files	Carl	Episode: "The Countess"; Season 1, Episode 3
1975	The Manchu Eagle Murder Caper Mystery	Oscar Cornell	
1975	When Things Were Rotten	Robin Hood	13 episodes
1976	Charlie's Angels	Barry Kingsbrook	Episode: "Homes, $weet Homes"; Season 4, Episode 18
1977	Fun with Dick and Jane	Dr. Will	
1977	The Hardy Boys/Nancy Drew Mysteries	Tail Gunner	Episode: "The Mystery of the Flying Courier; Season 1, Episode 9
1977	Billy Jack Goes to Washington	Governor Hubert Hopper	
1978	Wonder Woman (TV series)	Count Cagliostro	Episode: "Diana's Disappearing Act"; Season 2, Episode 15
1978	The Eddie Capra Mysteries	Lee Harriman	Episode: "The Intimate Friends of Janet Wilde"; Season 1, Episode 7
1979	$weepstake$	Victor	Season 1, Episode 7
1980	Marathon	Bud	TV movie
1981	Happy Days	Dr. Ludlow	Episode: "Welcome to My Nightmare"; Season 8, Episode 11
1985–1989	The Smurfs	Wooly Smurf	Voice
1985–1986	Inhumanoids	Crygen, Magnakor, Pyre	Voice
1986	Foofur	Louis	Voice
1986–1987	The Transformers	Hot Rod/Rodimus Prime	Voice
1986	G.I. Joe: A Real American Hero	Serpentor	Voice
1986	GoBots: Battle of the Rock Lords	Brimstone / Bugsie / Klaws / Narlihog	Voice
1987	G.I. Joe: The Movie	Serpentor	Voice
1987	DuckTales	Shifty's Pal / Mr. Wolf	2 episodes; Voice
1987	Matlock	Bobby Freemont	Episode: "The Gambler"; Season 2, Episode 7
1988	Glitch!	Julius Lazar	
1988	The New Yogi Bear Show	Additional Voices	
1989	Get Smart Again	Hymie the Robot	(Returning from 1960s series)
1990–1993	Tom & Jerry Kids	Spike Bulldog	Voice
1992	Batman: The Animated Series	Teddy	Guest star/Voice Episodes: "Feet of Clay": Parts 1 and 2
1992	The Naked Truth	The Bartender	
1992	Garfield and Friends	Skip Yenta	Guest star/Voice
1993	The Golden Palace	Bobby Lee	Episode: "The Chicken and the Egg"
1995	Dumb and Dumber The Animated Series	Gargle, Announcer	Guest star/Voice
1995	Captain Planet and the Planeteers	Okey Pinehead	Guest star/Voice
1996	Tonka Construction	Dirk	Voice
1997	Cow & Chicken	Red, Red's Dad, Butts, Barber	Voice
1998	Detective Barbie in The Mystery of the Carnival Caper	Burt Franklin	Voice

== Bibliography ==
- Gautier, Dick (1989). The Creative Cartoonist. Perigee Books. ISBN 0-399-51434-1.
- Gautier, Dick (1993). Child's Garden of Weirdness. Tuttle Publishing. ISBN 978-0804818254.
- Gautier, Dick (1994). Drawing and Cartooning 1,001 Figures in Action. Perigee Books. ISBN 978-0399518591.
- Gautier, Dick (1995). Drawing and Cartooning 1,001 Caricatures. Perigee Books. ISBN 978-0399519116.
- Gautier, Dick (1997). Creating Comic Characters. Perigee Books. ISBN 978-0399523519.
