= Bernie Kukoff =

American television director, producer and writer

- Occupation(s): Television director, television producer, television writer, theatre director
- Years active: 1970–2007

Bernie Kukoff is an American television director, producer and writer. He has produced and written for the television series Operation Petticoat, A Touch of Grace, The Cosby Show, Thea, Detective School and Diff'rent Strokes, creating the latter two series with Jeff Harris. He also created the NBC series Rags to Riches.

Kukoff and Harris (with Harry Colomby and Norman Steinberg) also co-scripted the 1984 film Johnny Dangerously with Harris. The film starred Michael Keaton and was directed by Amy Heckerling.

From 1996 to 2007, Kukoff produced a number of stage productions.
