= Mickey Finn =

Mickey Finn, Micky Finn, or Mickie Finn may refer to:

- Mickey Finn (drugs), a drug-laced drink
- Mickey Finn (comic strip), a long-running comic strip
- Mickey Finn (percussionist) (1947–2003), British drummer and former member of T. Rex
- Micky Finn (footballer) (born 1954), English former football goalkeeper
- Mickey Finn (guitarist) (1947–2013), British rock guitarist
- Mickey Finn (inventor) (1938–2007), American inventor of military systems and sports equipment
- Mickey Finn (Irish fiddler) (1951–1987), Irish fiddler
- Mickie Finn's, San Diego nightclub
- Mickey Finn (fiction), a fictional character and pseudonym of the 19th century writer Ernest Jarrold
- Mickie Finn's (TV series), a 1966 TV show

== See also ==
- Michael Flynn (disambiguation)
- Mike Fink (1770–1823), historical figure, in the folklore of the Ohio River keel boatmen
- Michael Finn (born 1970), an American politician
