= 1965–66 United States network television schedule =

The following is the 1965–66 network television schedule for the three major English language commercial broadcast networks in the United States. The schedule covers primetime hours from September 1965 through August 1966. The schedule is followed by a list per network of returning series, new series, and series cancelled after the 1964–65 season.

During this season, ABC and CBS initiated the broadcast of a predominant portion of their prime-time programming in color, while nearly all of NBC's autumn lineup was presented in color, except for the war drama Convoy and the fantasy sitcom I Dream of Jeannie. The former was terminated after 13 episodes, whereas the latter transitioned to color in the subsequent season. With the majority of prime-time content being produced in color, the scheduling for this season denoted the residual black-and-white programming with a "(B/W)" designation.

New series are highlighted in bold.

Each of the 30 highest-rated shows is listed with its rank and rating as determined by Nielsen Media Research.

Yellow indicates the programs in the top 10 for the season.
Cyan indicates the programs in the top 20 for the season.
Magenta indicates the programs in the top 30 for the season.

== Schedule ==
=== Sunday ===
Network		7:00 PM	7:30 PM	8:00 PM	8:30 PM	9:00 PM	9:30 PM	10:00 PM	10:30 PM
ABC	Fall	Voyage to the Bottom of the Sea		**The F.B.I.**		The ABC Sunday Night Movie (occasional B/W feature film)			
ABC	Summer	Voyage to the Bottom of the Sea		**Preview Tonight**		The ABC Sunday Night Movie (occasional B/W feature film)			
CBS		Lassie (27/21.8) (Tied with I Dream of Jeannie)	My Favorite Martian	The Ed Sullivan Show (17/23.2) (Tied with Walt Disney's Wonderful World of Color)		Perry Mason (B/W; one episode in color)		Candid Camera (B/W)	What's My Line? (B/W)
NBC		The Bell Telephone Hour (6:30) / Actuality Specials (6:30)	Walt Disney's Wonderful World of Color (17/23.2) (Tied with The Ed Sullivan Show)		Branded	Bonanza (1/31.8)		**The Wackiest Ship in the Army**	

Note: On ABC, Preview Tonight was a summer anthology series made up entirely of unsold television pilots.

=== Monday ===
Network		7:30 PM	8:00 PM	8:30 PM	9:00 PM	9:30 PM	10:00 PM	10:30 PM
ABC	Fall	12 O'Clock High (B/W)		**The Legend of Jesse James** (B/W)	**A Man Called Shenandoah** (B/W)	The Farmer's Daughter (third and fourth episodes in B/W)	Ben Casey (B/W)	
ABC	November	12 O'Clock High (B/W)		**The Legend of Jesse James** (B/W)	**A Man Called Shenandoah** (B/W)	Peyton Place (B/W)	Ben Casey (B/W)	
ABC	Spring	12 O'Clock High (B/W)		**The Legend of Jesse James** (B/W)	**A Man Called Shenandoah** (B/W)	Peyton Place (B/W)	The Avengers (B/W)	
CBS	Fall	To Tell the Truth (B/W)	I've Got a Secret (B/W) (19/22.4) (Tied with The Lawrence Welk Show)	The Lucy Show (3/27.7)	The Andy Griffith Show (6/26.9)	Hazel	**The Steve Lawrence Show** (B/W)	
CBS	Winter	To Tell the Truth (B/W)	I've Got a Secret (B/W) (19/22.4) (Tied with The Lawrence Welk Show)	The Lucy Show (3/27.7)	The Andy Griffith Show (6/26.9)	Hazel	**Art Linkletter's Hollywood Talent Scouts** (B/W)	
CBS	Summer	To Tell the Truth (B/W)	I've Got a Secret (B/W) (19/22.4) (Tied with The Lawrence Welk Show)	Vacation Playhouse	The Andy Griffith Show (6/26.9)	Hazel	**Art Linkletter's Hollywood Talent Scouts** (B/W)	
NBC		Hullabaloo	**The John Forsythe Show**	Dr. Kildare	The Andy Williams Show / Perry Como's Kraft Music Hall (once a month)		**Run for Your Life**	

Notes: On ABC, The Avengers replaced Ben Casey in March. On CBS, Art Linkletter's Hollywood Talent Scouts replaced The Steve Lawrence Show in December. Vacation Playhouse was a CBS summer anthology series made up entirely of unsold television pilots.

=== Tuesday ===
Network		7:30 PM	8:00 PM	8:30 PM	9:00 PM	9:30 PM	10:00 PM	10:30 PM
ABC		Combat! (B/W)		McHale's Navy (B/W)	**F Troop** (B/W)	Peyton Place (B/W)	The Fugitive (B/W)	
CBS	Fall	Rawhide (B/W)		The Red Skelton Hour (4/27.6)		Petticoat Junction (21/22.3)	CBS News Hour / CBS Reports (B/W; permanently shot in color beginning January 1966)	
CBS	Winter	**Daktari** (14/23.9)		The Red Skelton Hour (4/27.6)		Petticoat Junction (21/22.3)	CBS News Hour / CBS Reports (B/W; permanently shot in color beginning January 1966)	
CBS	Summer	**Daktari** (14/23.9)		**The Hippodrome**		Petticoat Junction (21/22.3)	CBS News Hour / CBS Reports (B/W; permanently shot in color beginning January 1966)	
NBC		**My Mother the Car**	**Please Don't Eat the Daisies** (first episode in B/W)	Dr. Kildare	**NBC Tuesday Night at the Movies**			

=== Wednesday ===
Network		7:30 PM	8:00 PM	8:30 PM	9:00 PM	9:30 PM	10:00 PM	10:30 PM
ABC	Fall	The Adventures of Ozzie and Harriet	The Patty Duke Show (B/W)	**Gidget**	**The Big Valley**		Amos Burke — Secret Agent* (B/W)	
ABC	Winter	**Batman** (10/24.7)	The Patty Duke Show (B/W)	**Blue Light**	**The Big Valley**		**The Long Hot Summer** (B/W)	
CBS	Fall	**Lost in Space** (B/W)		The Beverly Hillbillies (7/25.9) (Tied with Bewitched)	**Green Acres** (11/24.6)	The Dick Van Dyke Show (B/W) (16/23.6)	The Danny Kaye Show	
CBS	Summer	**Lost in Space** (B/W)		The Beverly Hillbillies (7/25.9) (Tied with Bewitched)	**Green Acres** (11/24.6)	The Dick Van Dyke Show (B/W) (16/23.6)	**The John Gary Show**	
NBC		The Virginian (23/22.0) (Tied with The Wild Wild West and The Jackie Gleason Show)			Bob Hope Presents the Chrysler Theatre / Chrysler Presents a Bob Hope Special		**I Spy**	

* formerly Burke's Law

=== Thursday ===
Network		7:30 PM	8:00 PM	8:30 PM	9:00 PM	9:30 PM	10:00 PM	10:30 PM
ABC	Fall	Shindig! (B/W)	The Donna Reed Show (B/W)	**O.K. Crackerby!** (first episode in B/W)	Bewitched (B/W) (7/25.9) (Tied with The Beverly Hillbillies)	Peyton Place (B/W)	**The Long Hot Summer** (B/W)	
ABC	Winter	**Batman** (5/27.0)	**Gidget**	**The Double Life of Henry Phyfe**	Bewitched (B/W) (7/25.9) (Tied with The Beverly Hillbillies)	Peyton Place (B/W)	**The Baron**	
CBS		The Munsters (B/W)	Gilligan's Island (22/22.1)	My Three Sons (15/23.8)	**The CBS Thursday Night Movie**			
NBC	Fall	Daniel Boone (26/21.9)		**Laredo**		**Mona McCluskey**	**The Dean Martin Show**	
NBC	Spring	Daniel Boone (26/21.9)		**Laredo**		**Mickie Finn's**	**The Dean Martin Show**	
NBC	Summer	Daniel Boone (26/21.9)		**Laredo**		**Mickie Finn's**	**The Dean Martin Summer Show**	

=== Friday ===
Network		7:30 PM	8:00 PM	8:30 PM	9:00 PM	9:30 PM	10:00 PM	10:30 PM
ABC	Fall	The Flintstones	**Tammy**	The Addams Family (B/W)	**Honey West** (B/W)	Peyton Place (B/W)	The Jimmy Dean Show	
ABC	November	The Flintstones	**Tammy**	The Addams Family (B/W)	**Honey West** (B/W)	The Farmer's Daughter	The Jimmy Dean Show	
ABC	Summer	The Flintstones	**Summer Fun**	The Addams Family (B/W)	**Honey West** (B/W)	The Farmer's Daughter	**Court Martial** (B/W)	
CBS	Fall	**The Wild Wild West** (B/W) (23/22.0) (Tied with The Jackie Gleason Show and The Virginian)		**Hogan's Heroes** (first episode in B/W) (9/24.9)	Gomer Pyle, U.S.M.C. (2/27.8)	**The Smothers Brothers Show** (B/W)	Slattery's People (B/W)	
CBS	Winter	**The Wild Wild West** (B/W) (23/22.0) (Tied with The Jackie Gleason Show and The Virginian)		**Hogan's Heroes** (first episode in B/W) (9/24.9)	Gomer Pyle, U.S.M.C. (2/27.8)	**The Smothers Brothers Show** (B/W)	**The Trials of O'Brien** (B/W)	
CBS	Summer	**The Wild Wild West** (B/W) (23/22.0) (Tied with The Jackie Gleason Show and The Virginian)		**Hogan's Heroes** (first episode in B/W) (9/24.9)	Gomer Pyle, U.S.M.C. (2/27.8)	**The Smothers Brothers Show** (B/W)	**Wayne & Shuster Take An Affectionate Look At...** (B/W)	
NBC	Fall	**Camp Runamuck**	**Hank** (first episode in B/W)	**Convoy** (B/W)		**Mister Roberts**	The Man from U.N.C.L.E. (13/24.0)	
NBC	Winter	**Camp Runamuck**	**Hank** (first episode in B/W)	**The Sammy Davis Jr. Show**		**Mister Roberts**	The Man from U.N.C.L.E. (13/24.0)	
NBC	Summer	**Camp Runamuck**	**Hank** (first episode in B/W)	Sing Along with Mitch (repeats)		**Mister Roberts**	The Man from U.N.C.L.E. (13/24.0)	

Notes: The Farmer's Daughter took over the 9:30–10 time period on ABC, effective November 5, because many viewers were not home to watch Peyton Place on Fridays. Starting November 1, Peyton Place was seen Monday, Tuesday, and Thursday. In the winter of 1966, The Sammy Davis Jr. Show, which was transmitted live in color, replaced Convoy in its timeslot on NBC. Summer Fun was an ABC summer anthology series made up entirely of unsold television pilots.

=== Saturday ===
Network		7:30 PM	8:00 PM	8:30 PM	9:00 PM	9:30 PM	10:00 PM	10:30 PM
ABC	Fall	Shindig! (B/W)	The King Family Show	The Lawrence Welk Show (19/22.4) (Tied with I've Got a Secret)		The Hollywood Palace		ABC Scope (B/W)
ABC	Winter	The Adventures of Ozzie and Harriet	The Donna Reed Show (B/W)	The Lawrence Welk Show (19/22.4) (Tied with I've Got a Secret)		The Hollywood Palace		ABC Scope (B/W)
CBS	Fall	The Jackie Gleason Show (B/W) (23/22.0) (Tied with The Wild Wild West and The Virginian)		**The Trials of O'Brien** (B/W)		**The Loner** (B/W)	Gunsmoke (B/W) (30/21.3)	
CBS	Winter	The Jackie Gleason Show (B/W) (23/22.0) (Tied with The Wild Wild West and The Virginian)		Secret Agent (B/W)		**The Loner** (B/W)	Gunsmoke (B/W) (30/21.3)	
CBS	Summer	**Continental Showcase**		Secret Agent (B/W)		**The Face is Familiar**	Gunsmoke (B/W) (30/21.3)	
NBC		Flipper (29/21.6)	**I Dream of Jeannie** (B/W)(27/21.8) (Tied with Lassie)	**Get Smart** (first episode in B/W) (12/24.5)	NBC Saturday Night at the Movies			

Note: Even though ABC Scope was scheduled at 10:30 PM, not one major station (including WABC-TV New York, the network's flagship station) carried it in that time period, preferring to schedule local or syndicated programming in its place. Most affiliates aired it in "fringe time" during the weekend.

== By network ==
=== ABC ===
**Returning Series**

- 12 O'Clock High
- ABC Scope
- The ABC Sunday Night Movie
- The Addams Family
- The Adventures of Ozzie and Harriet
- Amos Burke — Secret Agent
- The Avengers
- Ben Casey
- Bewitched
- Combat!
- The Donna Reed Show
- The Farmer's Daughter
- The Flintstones
- The Fugitive
- The Hollywood Palace
- The Jimmy Dean Show
- The King Family Show
- The Lawrence Welk Show
- McHale's Navy
- The Patty Duke Show
- Peyton Place
- Saga of Western Man
- Shindig!
- Voyage to the Bottom of the Sea

**New Series**

- **The Baron**
- **Batman** *
- **The Big Valley**
- **Blue Light** *
- **Court Martial** *
- **The Double Life of Henry Phyfe** *
- **F Troop**
- **The F.B.I.**
- **Gidget**
- **Honey West**
- **The Legend of Jesse James**
- **The Long Hot Summer**
- **A Man Called Shenandoah**
- **O.K. Crackerby!**
- **Preview Tonight** *
- **Summer Fun** *
- **Tammy**

Not returning from 1964–65:

- The Bing Crosby Show
- Broadside
- F.D.R.
- Jonny Quest
- Mickey
- My Three Sons (moved to CBS)
- No Time for Sergeants
- The Outer Limits
- The Tycoon
- Valentine's Day
- Wagon Train
- Wendy and Me

=== CBS ===
**Returning Series**

- The Andy Griffith Show
- The Beverly Hillbillies
- Candid Camera
- CBS News Hour
- CBS Reports
- The Danny Kaye Show
- The Dick Van Dyke Show
- The Ed Sullivan Show
- Gilligan's Island
- Gomer Pyle, U.S.M.C.
- Gunsmoke
- Hazel (moved from NBC)
- I've Got a Secret
- The Jackie Gleason Show
- Lassie
- The Lucy Show
- The Munsters
- My Favorite Martian
- My Three Sons (moved from ABC)
- Perry Mason
- Petticoat Junction
- Rawhide
- The Red Skelton Hour
- Secret Agent
- Slattery's People
- To Tell the Truth
- The Twentieth Century
- Vacation Playhouse
- What's My Line?

**New Series**

- **Art Linkletter's Hollywood Talent Scouts**
- **CBS Thursday Night Movie**
- **Continental Showcase**
- **Daktari** *
- **The Face Is Familiar** *
- **Green Acres**
- **The Hippodrome** *
- **Hogan's Heroes**
- **The John Gary Show** *
- **The Loner**
- **Lost in Space**
- **The Smothers Brothers Show**
- **The Smothers Brothers Summer Show** *
- **The Steve Lawrence Show**
- **The Trials of O'Brien**
- **Wayne & Shuster Take An Affectionate Look At...** *
- **The Wild Wild West**

Not returning from 1964–65:

- The Baileys of Balboa
- The Cara Williams Show
- The Celebrity Game
- The Defenders
- The Doctors and the Nurses
- The Entertainers
- Fanfare
- For the People
- Glynis
- The Great Adventure
- The Joey Bishop Show
- Many Happy Returns
- Mr. Broadway
- Mister Ed
- My Living Doll
- On Broadway Tonight
- Our Private World
- Password
- The Reporter
- Summer Playhouse
- World War One

=== NBC ===
**Returning Series**

- Actuality Specials
- The Andy Williams Show
- The Bell Telephone Hour
- Bob Hope Presents the Chrysler Theatre
- Bonanza
- Branded
- Daniel Boone
- Dr. Kildare
- Flipper
- The Man from U.N.C.L.E.
- NBC Saturday Night at the Movies
- Perry Como's Kraft Music Hall
- The Virginian
- Walt Disney's Wonderful World of Color

**New Series**

- **Camp Runamuck**
- **Convoy**
- **The Dean Martin Show**
- **The Dean Martin Summer Show** *
- **Get Smart**
- **Hank**
- **I Dream of Jeannie**
- **I Spy**
- **The John Forsythe Show**
- **Laredo**
- **Mickie Finn's** *
- **Mister Roberts**
- **Mona McCluskey**
- **My Mother the Car**
- **Please Don't Eat the Daisies**
- **Run for Your Life**
- **The Sammy Davis Jr. Show** *
- **The Wackiest Ship in the Army**

Not returning from 1964–65:

- 90 Bristol Court
- The Alfred Hitchcock Hour
- The Bill Dana Show
- Cloak of Mystery
- The Famous Adventures of Mr. Magoo
- Harris Against the World
- Hazel (moved to CBS)
- Hullabaloo
- International Showtime
- The Jack Benny Program
- The Jack Paar Program
- Karen
- Kentucky Jones
- Kraft Suspense Theater
- Mr. Novak
- Moment of Fear
- Profiles in Courage
- The Rogues
- Tom, Dick, and Mary

Note: The * indicates that the program was introduced in midseason.
