= 1966 in American television =

This is a list of American television-related events in 1966.

== Events ==
| Date | Event | Ref. |
|---|---|---|
| January 11 | Dorothy Malone resumes the role of Constance Carson in the ABC primetime soap opera Peyton Place. She was temporarily replaced by Lola Albright in the interim. | |
| January 13 | Tabitha Stephens is born on the ABC sitcom Bewitched, in the episode titled, "And Then There Were Three." | |
| February 15 | Fred Friendly resigns from CBS News due to circumstances beyond his control. | |
| February 27 | The only Perry Mason episode ever broadcast in color, titled, "The Case of the Twice-Told Twist", airs on CBS. | |
| April 18 | ABC's annual broadcast of the Academy Awards airs in color for the first time ever. | |
| July 16 | The Miss Universe pageant is broadcast in color for the first time ever. | |
| September 10 | The annual Miss America Pageant is broadcast on NBC for the first time ever. This broadcast is also the first Miss America pageant to be telecast in color. | |
| September 19 | With the premiere episode of That Girl through ABC, KENI-TV becomes the first television station in Alaska to broadcast any program in color. | |
| October 6 | A prime-time edition of The Dating Game is launched on ABC following the cancellation of The Tammy Grimes Show. | |
| October 17 | All programming from NBC's news division begins airing in color. | |
| November 7 | The NBC game show Concentration becomes the last program on the network to go full color, thus making NBC the first full-color television network. | |
| November 19 | ABC affiliate KHVH-TV (now KITV) in Honolulu, Hawaii conducts the first-ever live 2-way satellite telecasts between Hawaii and the mainland, through the facilities of the Lani Bird satellite. | |
| December 18 | The Dr. Seuss' holiday special How the Grinch Stole Christmas!, narrated by Boris Karloff, is broadcast for the first time on CBS. It becomes a holiday tradition. | |

=== Other events in 1966 ===
- The early 1950s CBS sitcom Amos 'n' Andy is pulled from off-network syndication in response to complaints from civil rights organizations, including the NAACP.

== Television programs ==
=== Debuts ===
| Date | Debut | Network |
|---|---|---|
| January 3 | Eye Guess | NBC |
| January 8 | Court Martial | ABC |
| January 11 | Daktari | CBS |
| January 12 | Batman | ABC |
| January 12 | Blue Light | ABC |
| April 1 | The 700 Club | CBN; Syndication |
| April 4 | Firing Line | Syndication |
| April 21 | Batfink | KTLA |
| June 27 | Dark Shadows | ABC |
| July 4 | Chain Letter | NBC |
| July 4 | Showdown | NBC |
| July 11 | The Newlywed Game | ABC |
| July 22 | Summer Fun | ABC |
| August 14 | Preview Tonight | ABC |
| September 4 | The Jerry Lewis MDA Labor Day Telethon | WNEW-TV |
| September 5 | The Marvel Super Heroes | Syndication |
| September 6 | Love on a Rooftop | ABC |
| September 6 | The Pruitts of Southampton | ABC |
| September 7 | The Monroes | ABC |
| September 8 | Hawk | ABC |
| September 8 | Star Trek: The Original Series | NBC |
| September 8 | Tarzan | NBC |
| September 8 | That Girl | ABC |
| September 9 | The Green Hornet | ABC |
| September 9 | The Time Tunnel | ABC |
| September 10 | The Adventures of Superboy | CBS |
| September 10 | Cool McCool | NBC |
| September 10 | Frankenstein Jr. and The Impossibles | CBS |
| September 10 | The King Kong Show | ABC |
| September 10 | Laurel and Hardy | NBC |
| September 10 | The Lone Ranger | CBS |
| September 10 | The New Adventures of Superman | CBS |
| September 10 | Shane | ABC |
| September 10 | Space Ghost | CBS |
| September 10 | The Space Kidettes | NBC |
| September 10 | The Super 6 | NBC |
| September 11 | It's About Time | CBS |
| September 12 | Family Affair | CBS |
| September 12 | The Felony Squad | ABC |
| September 12 | Iron Horse | NBC |
| September 12 | The Monkees | NBC |
| September 12 | The Rat Patrol | ABC |
| September 12 | Run, Buddy, Run | CBS |
| September 13 | Occasional Wife | NBC |
| September 14 | ABC Stage 67 | ABC |
| September 16 | T.H.E. Cat | NBC |
| September 16 | The Girl from U.N.C.L.E. | NBC |
| September 17 | Mission: Impossible | CBS |
| September 17 | Pistols 'n' Petticoats | CBS |
| October 17 | The Hollywood Squares | NBC |
| October 29 | The Mighty Heroes | CBS |
| December 23 | Hoolihan & Big Chuck | WJW-TV |

=== Ending this year ===
| Date | Show | Network | Debut | Notes |
|---|---|---|---|---|
| January 4 | Rawhide | CBS | January 9, 1959 | |
| January 8 | Shindig! | ABC | September 16, 1964 | |
| January 12 | Burke's Law | ABC | September 20, 1963 | |
| January 29 | Tennessee Tuxedo and His Tales | CBS | September 28, 1963 | |
| February 6 | Mister Ed | CBS | January 5, 1961 | |
| March 11 | Tammy | ABC | September 17, 1965 | |
| March 12 | The Loner | CBS | September 18, 1965 | |
| March 19 | The Donna Reed Show | ABC | September 24, 1958 | |
| March 21 | Ben Casey | ABC | 1961 | |
| April 1 | The Flintstones | ABC | September 30, 1960 | |
| April 5 | My Mother the Car | NBC | September 14, 1965 | |
| April 8 | Honey West | ABC | September 17, 1965 | |
| April 8 | The Addams Family | ABC | September 18, 1964 | |
| April 11 | Hazel | CBS | September 28, 1961 (on NBC) | |
| April 11 | Hullabaloo | NBC | January 12, 1965 | |
| April 12 | McHale's Navy | ABC | October 11, 1962 | |
| April 13 | The Long, Hot Summer | ABC | September 16, 1965 | |
| April 14 | Mona McCluskey | NBC | September 16, 1965 | |
| April 15 | Camp Runamuck | NBC | September 17, 1965 | |
| April 17 | The Wackiest Ship in the Army | NBC | September 19, 1965 | |
| April 21 | Gidget | ABC | September 15, 1965 | |
| April 22 | The Farmer's Daughter | ABC | September 20, 1963 | |
| April 22 | The Smothers Brothers Show | CBS | September 17, 1965 | |
| April 23 | The Adventures of Ozzie and Harriet | ABC | October 3, 1952 | |
| April 24 | Branded | NBC | January 24, 1965 | |
| April 27 | The Patty Duke Show | ABC | September 18, 1963 | |
| May 1 | My Favorite Martian | CBS | September 29, 1963 | |
| May 9 | The Legend of Jesse James | ABC | September 13, 1965 | |
| May 12 | The Munsters | CBS | September 24, 1964 | |
| May 16 | A Man Called Shenandoah | ABC | September 13, 1965 | |
| May 18 | Blue Light | ABC | January 12, 1966 | |
| May 22 | Perry Mason | CBS | September 21, 1957 | |
| May 27 | The Trials of O'Brien | CBS | September 18, 1965 | |
| May 28 | Sinbad Jr. and his Magic Belt | Syndication | September 11, 1965 | |
| June 1 | The Dick Van Dyke Show | CBS | October 3, 1961 | |
| September 2 | Mister Roberts | NBC | September 17, 1965 | |
| September 2 | Summer Fun | ABC | July 22, 1966 | |
| September | The New 3 Stooges | Syndication | October 1965 | |
| September 2 | Court Martial | ABC | January 8, 1966 | |
| September 11 | Preview Tonight | ABC | August 14, 1966 | |
| October 14 | Chain Letter | NBC | July 4, 1966 | |
| October 14 | Showdown | NBC | July 4, 1966 | |
| October 24 | Peter Potamus | Syndication | September 16, 1964 | |
| December 16 | Shock Theater | WJW-TV | January 13, 1963 | |
| December 16 | Hawk | ABC | September 8, 1966 | |
| December 31 | Shane | ABC | September 10, 1966 | |
| December | The Marvel Super Heroes | Syndication | September 1966 | |

=== Television movies, specials and miniseries ===
| Title | Network | Date(s) of airing | Notes/Ref, |
|---|---|---|---|
| An Evening with Carol Channing | CBS | February 18 | |
| Color Me Barbra | CBS | March 30 | Starred Barbra Streisand. |
| It's the Great Pumpkin, Charlie Brown | CBS | October 27 | Annual reruns of this holiday special became an annual tradition on broadcast television until 2021. |
| How the Grinch Stole Christmas! | CBS | December 18 | Annual reruns of this holiday special became an annual tradition. |
| Yule Log | WPIX-TV | December 24 | Annual reruns of this holiday special became an annual tradition. |

== Networks and services ==
=== Network launches ===
| Network | Type | Launch date | Source |
|---|---|---|---|
| Arkansas Educational Television Network | Regional over-the-air public broadcast | December 4 | |

== Television stations ==
=== Sign-ons ===
| Date | City of License/Market | Station | Channel | Affiliation | Notes/Ref. |
|---|---|---|---|---|---|
| January 4 | Chicago, Illinois | WFLD | 32 | Independent | now a Fox O&O station |
| January 21 | Appleton, Minnesota | KWCM | 9 | NET | |
| January 24 | Duluth, Minnesota | WDIO-TV | 10 | ABC | |
| January 25 | Atlantic City, New Jersey | WCMC-TV | 40 | NBC | |
| February 19 | Jacksonville, Florida | WJKS-TV | 17 | ABC | |
| February 23 | Roswell, New Mexico | KBIM-TV | 10 | CBS | Satellite of KGGM (now KRQE) in Albuquerque |
| March 4 | Roanoke, Virginia | WRFT-TV | 27 | ABC | |
| April 2 | Erie, Pennsylvania | WJET-TV | 24 | ABC | |
| April 5 | Fort Pierce/West Palm Beach, Florida | WTVX | 34 | Independent | |
| April 15 | Honolulu, Hawaii | KHET | 11 | NET | |
| April 20 | Washington, D.C. | WDCA | 20 | Independent | |
| May 3 | Toledo, Ohio | WNWO-TV | 24 | Independent | |
| May 14 | Portsmouth, Ohio | WRLO | 30 | | |
| May 17 | Sayre, Oklahoma | KVIJ-TV | 8 | ABC | Satellite of KVII-TV/Oklahoma City |
| May 29 | San Juan, Puerto Rico | WITA-TV | 31 | Religious independent | |
| May 31 | Oklahoma City, Oklahoma | KLPR-TV | 14 | Independent | |
| June 29 | Corona/Los Angeles, California | KMTW-TV | 52 | Independent | |
| July 29 | Lebanon, New Hampshire | WRLH | 31 | NBC | |
| August 15 | Modesto/Sacramento, California | KLOC-TV | 19 | Independent | |
| September 6 | Columbia, South Carolina | WRLK-TV | 35 | NET | Flagship of the South Carolina ETV network |
| September 6 | Rochester, New York | WXXI | 21 | NET | |
| September 7 | Alliance, Nebraska | KTNE-TV | 13 | NET | Part of Nebraska ETV |
| September 12 | North Platte, Nebraska | KPNE-TV | 6 | NET | Part of Nebraska ETV |
| September 12 | Wrens/Augusta, Georgia | WCES-TV | 20 | NET | Part of the Georgia Public Broadcasting television network |
| September 22 | Scranton, Pennsylvania | WVIA-TV | 44 | NET | |
| September 22 | Wailuku, Hawaii | KMEB | 10 | NET | |
| October 18 | Sitka/Juneau, Alaska | KIFW-TV | 13 | CBS | |
| October 20 | Wausau, Wisconsin | WAEO-TV | 12 | NBC | |
| November 2 | Lead, South Dakota | KHSD-TV | 5 | CBS | Satellite of KOTA-TV (now KHME) in Rapid City |
| December 4 | Little Rock, Arkansas | KETS | 2 | NET | Flagship of the Arkansas Educational Television Network |
| Unknown date | Jamestown/Buffalo, New York | WNYP-TV | 26 | CTV | Only major television station in the U.S. to ever be affiliated with a Canadian television network on a primary basis |

=== Network affiliation changes ===
| Date | City of license/Market | Station | Channel | Old affiliation | New affiliation | Notes/Ref. |
|---|---|---|---|---|---|---|
| January 24 | Duluth, Minnesota | KDAL-TV | 3 | CBS (primary); ABC (secondary) | CBS (exclusive) | KDAL and WDSM dropped ABC programming upon the sign-on of WDIO-TV. |
| January 24 | Superior, Wisconsin (Duluth, Minnesota) | WDSM-TV | 6 | NBC (primary); ABC (secondary) | NBC (exclusive) | KDAL and WDSM dropped ABC programming upon the sign-on of WDIO-TV. |
| February 1 | Great Falls, Montana | KFBB-TV | 5 | CBS (primary); ABC (secondary) | ABC (primary); CBS (secondary) | KFBB becomes the first primary ABC affiliate in Montana. |
| February 19 | Jacksonville, Florida | WMBR-TV | 4 | CBS (primary); ABC (secondary) | CBS (exclusive) | |
| February 19 | Jacksonville, Florida | WFGA-TV | 12 | NBC (primary); ABC (secondary) | NBC (exclusive) | |
| May 1 | Fort Pierce/West Palm Beach, Florida | WTVX | 34 | Independent | CBS | |
| October 20 | Wausau, Wisconsin | WSAW-TV | 7 | CBS (primary); NBC (secondary) | CBS (exclusive) | |
| Unknown date | Austin, Texas | KTBC | 7 | CBS (primary); ABC and NBC (secondary) | CBS (primary); ABC (secondary) | |
| Unknown date | Austin, Texas | KHFI-TV | 36 | Independent | NBC | |
