= Jarrold =

Jarrold is a surname. Notable people with the surname include:

- Ernest Jarrold (1848–1912), American author
- Julian Jarrold (born 1960), English film and television director
- Ken Jarrold (born 1948), British health service manager
- Thomas Jarrold (1770–1853), English physician
