= Top-rated United States television programs of 1965–66 =

This table displays the top-rated primetime television series of the 1965–66 season as measured by Nielsen Media Research.

Rank	Program	Network	Rating
1	Bonanza	NBC	31.8
2	Gomer Pyle, U.S.M.C.	CBS	27.8
3	The Lucy Show	CBS	27.7
4	The Red Skelton Hour	CBS	27.6
5	Batman (Thurs.)	ABC	27.0
6	The Andy Griffith Show	CBS	26.9
7	Bewitched	ABC	25.9
7	The Beverly Hillbillies	CBS	25.9
9	Hogan's Heroes	CBS	24.9
10	Batman (Wed.)	ABC	24.7
11	Green Acres	CBS	24.6
12	Get Smart	NBC	24.5
13	The Man from U.N.C.L.E.	NBC	24.0
14	Daktari	CBS	23.9
15	My Three Sons	CBS	23.8
16	The Dick Van Dyke Show	CBS	23.6
17	Walt Disney's Wonderful World of Color	NBC	23.2
17	The Ed Sullivan Show	CBS	23.2
19	The Lawrence Welk Show	ABC	22.4
19	I've Got a Secret	CBS	22.4
21	Petticoat Junction	CBS	22.3
22	Gilligan's Island	CBS	22.1
23	The Wild Wild West	CBS	22.0
23	The Jackie Gleason Show	CBS	22.0
23	The Virginian	NBC	22.0
26	Daniel Boone	NBC	21.9
27	Lassie	CBS	21.8
27	I Dream of Jeannie	NBC	21.8
29	Flipper	NBC	21.6
30	Gunsmoke	CBS	21.3
