= Monroe Rosenfeld =

American songwriter and journalist (died 1918)

Monroe H. Rosenfeld

Background information
- Born: Richmond, Virginia, U.S.
- Died: December 13, 1918 (aged 56) Manhattan, New York City, New York, U.S.
- Genres: Traditional pop, vaudeville
- Occupations: Songwriter, journalist, music publisher
- Years active: c.1880–1918

Monroe H. "Rosey" Rosenfeld (died December 13, 1918) was an American songwriter and journalist.

In 1895, he was described by Ernest Jarrold in Munsey's Magazine as being in the "front rank" of successful popular song writers, with a reputation as a "graceful, prolific, and versatile composer".

== Biography ==
Rosenfeld was born in Richmond, Virginia, the son of Jewish German immigrants.

By the early 1880s, he was working in New York City as a songwriter, often using pseudonyms such as E. Heiser and F. Belasco. He started having success around 1884 with such songs as "Climbing Up the Golden Stairs", and "Her Golden Hair Was Hanging Down Her Back", written with Scottish-born composer Felix McGlennon and recorded by Dan Quinn.

His other successes as a songwriter included "Johnny Get Your Gun" (1886, credited as F. Belasco), and his most famous work, "With All Her Faults I Love Her Still" (1888), which sold more than 100,000 copies (Note: In 1900, a newspaper report gave a figure of 280,000 copies, and stated that Rosenfeld's songs had earned $500,000.) in piano sheet music. The latter song was based on an earlier tune by Theodore Metz, but Rosenfeld was notorious for making use of lax copyright laws to claim publishing rights in his own name, and sometimes bragged that he stole some of his best tunes.

Rosenfeld was regarded as "a master of the tragic boy-girl tale set to music", and became a well-known local character, noted for his loves of poker, women and gambling.

Described as "restless and volatile", Rosenfeld also worked as a press agent and journalist. In 1899, he started writing a series of articles on popular music in the New York Herald.

Reputedly, he visited the office of songwriter Harry Von Tilzer, who used a piano with muffled keys to reduce the likelihood of complaints from his neighbors, and commented that the sound reminded him of tin cans, to which von Tilzer replied, "Yes, I guess this is a tin pan alley." The phrase was contained in the title of one of Rosenfeld's articles and became widely used as a description of the area of songwriting offices on West 28th Street in Manhattan.

In 1917, Rosenfeld became the editor of a music magazine, The Tuneful Yankee, and set up an office to manage music copyrights.

== Death ==
He died of "acute indigestion" on December 13, 1918, aged 56, at his home in Manhattan. He left a widow and daughter. He was cremated.
