= Michael Flynn (disambiguation) =

== Government ==
- Michael Flynn, retired United States Army lieutenant general and former National Security Advisor to Donald Trump
- Michael Flynn (EPA administrator), former deputy administrator of the United States Environmental Protection Agency
- Mike Flynn (transportation official), head of New York City Department of Transportation

== Sport ==
- Michael Flynn (footballer) (born 1980), Welsh footballer and football manager
- Mike Flynn (footballer) (born 1969), English footballer
- Mike Flynn (American football) (born 1974), American football player
- Mick Flynn (rugby union), Australian rugby union player
- Mike Flynn (baseball) (1872–1941), American baseball player
- Mike Flynn (basketball) (born 1953), American basketball player

== Others ==
- Michael Flynn (writer) (1947–2023), American science fiction author
- Michael J. Flynn (born 1934), American computer engineer
- Mike Flynn (editor) (1968–2016), American website editor
- Michael Flynn (businessman) (born 1950/1951), Irish businessman known as Mattress Mick
- Mike Flynn, American radio host of The Folk Sampler
- Michael William Flynn (1948–2014), musician and half of the music duo Buxton-Flynn with Glen Buxton

== See also ==
- Mick Flynn (born 1960), British soldier
- Mickey Finn (disambiguation)
