= Mickey Manners =

American actor, singer, dancer and stand-up comedian

- Manners in Many Happy Returns, 1964
- Born: Solomon Shapiro; October 12, 1925; New York, U.S.
- Died: January 28, 2016 (aged 90)
- Occupations: Actor; singer; dancer; stand-up comedian

Mickey Manners (October 12, 1925 – January 28, 2016) was an American actor, singer, dancer, and stand-up comedian.

== Acting career ==
Manners was a regular panelist on the game show Pantomime Quiz. He also appeared on Murphy Brown, The Rifleman, Here's Lucy, The Ghost & Mrs. Muir, Hogan's Heroes, Lost in Space, Get Smart, and Perry Mason. He had small roles in two Jerry Lewis films: The Errand Boy (1961) and Which Way to the Front? (1970).

In the 1964–1965 season, he starred with John McGiver in the role of Joe Foley on the short-lived CBS sitcom Many Happy Returns, set in the complaint department of a fictitious Los Angeles department store. He appeared in the 1965 Perry Mason episode "The Case of the Laughing Lady" as Lenny Linden, the comedian nephew of series regular Terrance Clay, proprietor of Clay's Bar and Grill.

He played a bartender/bouncer as a regular cast member of the Mickie Finn's musical variety show broadcast on NBC in the spring and summer of 1966.

== Personal life ==
Manners was born Solomon Shapiro in New York City in 1925. He married Jane, one of the June Taylor Dancers, and they had five children. Manners later lived in San Fernando Valley with his daughters Debra and Tracy and his grandson Michael. He died January 28, 2016, at age 90.

== Filmography ==
Year	Title	Role	Notes
1961	The Errand Boy	Larkin	
1963	The Nutty Professor	College Student	Uncredited
1970	Which Way to the Front?	SS Guard	
