= Peter Bonerz =

American actor and director (born 1938)

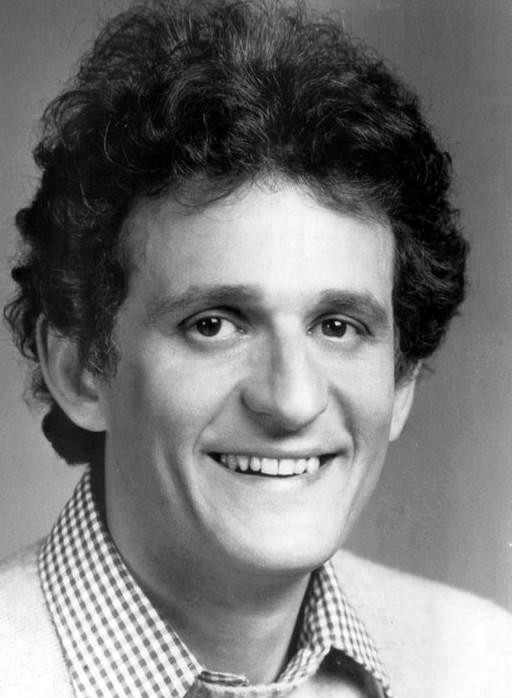
- Bonerz in July 1973
- Born: Peter Roman Bonerz; August 6, 1938 (age 88); Portsmouth, New Hampshire, U.S.
- Education: Marquette University
- Occupations: Actor; director
- Years active: 1965–present
- Spouse: Rosalind DiTrapani Bonerz (m. 1963)
- Children: 2

Peter Roman Bonerz (/ˈbɒnərz/, born August 6, 1938) is an American actor and director; best known for playing Dr. Jerry Robinson on The Bob Newhart Show.

== Early life ==
Bonerz was born in Portsmouth, New Hampshire, to Elfrieda (née Kern) and Christopher Bonerz. He grew up in Milwaukee, Wisconsin, where he attended Marquette University High School. Here, performing with the Prep Players, he gained his first theatrical experience. At Marquette University, he participated in the Marquette University Players. After graduating with a Bachelor of Science degree in 1960, he decided to seek a career in theater, starting in New York City in improv with a troupe called The Premise. After compulsory service as a draftee in the United States Army, he worked with an improv troupe in San Francisco known as The Committee, whose members included Rob Reiner, David Ogden Stiers, Howard Hesseman and Hamilton Camp.

== Career ==
Bonerz's first network television appearance was in 1965 on The Addams Family in the season-two episode "Morticia, The Writer". He had several more TV appearances in the late 1960s and also had roles in several films, including Funnyman (1967); What Ever Happened to Aunt Alice? (1969); Medium Cool (1969); Catch-22 (1970), which also included his future co-star Bob Newhart; Jennifer on My Mind (1971); and Fuzz (1972). In 1971, Bonerz was part of an ensemble cast in the short-lived improvisational television show Story Theatre, which also included Alan Alda and Valerie Harper. In 1972, he landed the popular supporting role of Dr. Jerry Robinson, the eccentric orthodontist on The Bob Newhart Show, whose most frequent comic foil was Marcia Wallace as Carol, the sharp-tongued receptionist. Bonerz would reprise this role in a cameo appearance in the final, unaired episode of Bob Newhart's third series, Bob. He also directed 29 episodes of Newhart. The show ran for six seasons, with ratings among the top 20 in the first three seasons. Bonerz became the last surviving main cast member upon the death of Bob Newhart in 2024.

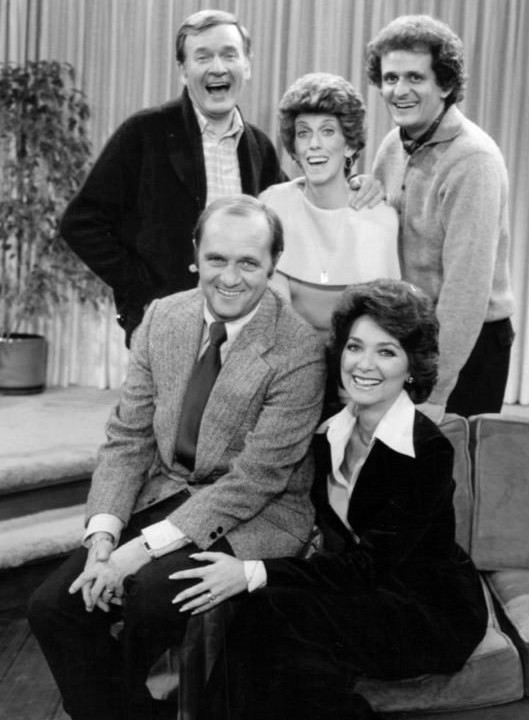
(L to R): Bill Daily, Bob Newhart, Marcia Wallace, Suzanne Pleshette, and Bonerz in The Bob Newhart Show (1977)

His later acting roles included the TV miniseries The Bastard (1978) and as a psychiatrist in the movie Serial (1980). In 1979, Bonerz appeared on Password Plus as a game show contestant/celebrity guest star with Marcia Wallace, his costar from The Bob Newhart Show. In 1986, Bonerz co-starred with Tuesday Weld and River Phoenix in the television movie Circle of Violence: A Family Drama. In 1999, he played Ed. Weinberger in the movie Man on the Moon. He voiced Sal in the Aaahh!!! Real Monsters episode "Internal Affairs". In 2014, he played Doug Demarco in the "Anniversaries" episode of Parks and Recreation.

Beginning in 1974, Bonerz directed 29 episodes of The Bob Newhart Show. Between 1974 and 2011, he directed over 350 episodes of various shows, including series like Murphy Brown (93 episodes), Home Improvement (29 episodes), E/R (22 episodes), Friends (12 episodes), Joey (3 episodes), and many others such as Wings, NewsRadio, Archie Bunker's Place, and ALF. He also directed films such as Nobody's Perfekt (1981) and Police Academy 6: City Under Siege (1989).

== Personal life ==
Bonerz married Rosalind DiTrapani in 1963; together they have two sons, Eli and Eric.

== Partial filmography ==
=== As actor ===
- 1965: The Addams Family as Mr. Boswell
- 1966: Summer Fun as "Chips"
- 1967: Hey, Landlord as Proctor
- 1967: Funnyman as Perry
- 1968: That Girl as Larry Yorkin
- 1968–1969: The Smothers Brothers Comedy Hour as Various Roles
- 1969: Where It's At as Unknown Role
- 1969: Whatever Happened to Aunt Alice? as Mr. Bentley
- 1969: Medium Cool as Gus
- 1969: The Governor & J.J. as Hubbell
- 1970: A Storm in Summer as Stanley
- 1970: Catch-22 as MacWatt
- 1970: Hawaii Five-O as Earl
- 1971: U.S.A. as Unknown Role
- 1971: Story Theatre as Unknown Role
- 1971: McMillan and Wife as George Harvard (ep. “Death is a Seven Point Favorite”)
- 1971: Jennifer of My Mind as Sergei Wasserman
- 1972: Sanford and Son as Doctor
- 1972–1978: The Bob Newhart Show as Dr. Jerry Robinson
- 1986: Murder, She Wrote as Calhoun Fletcher (ep. “The Perfect Foil”)

=== As director ===
- 1966: Summer Fun
- 1974: The Mary Tyler Moore Show
- 1974: Paul Sand in Friends and Lovers
- 1974–1978: The Bob Newhart Show
- 1975: When Things Were Rotten
- 1976: Good Heavens
- 1976: Father O Father (TV film)
- 1976: The Tony Randall Show
- 1977: Szysznyk
- 1978: Apple Pie
- 1979: McGurk: A Dog's Life
- 1980: Love, Natalie
- 1980: G.I.'s
- 1981: Nobody's Perfekt
- 1982: In Security
- 1982: High Five (TV short)
- 1983: Focus on Fishko (short)
- 1983: Simeon Show
- 1984: Back Together
- 1984: Suzanne Pleshette Is Maggie Briggs
- 1985: The Recovery Room
- 1988: Sharing Richard
- 1989: Police Academy 6: City Under Siege
- 1989: Julie Brown: The Show (TV short)
- 1993: The Elvira Show (TV short)
- 1996–1999: Home Improvement
- 2005–2006: Joey
- 2005–2007: Living with Fran
- 2006: Drive/II
- 2011: $h*! My Dad Says
