= Khan! (TV series) =

- Genre: Police drama
- Written by: Michael Fisher; Laurence Heath
- Directed by: Bill Derwin; Ivan Dixon
- Starring: Khigh Dhiegh (uncredited); Vic Tayback; Evan C. Kim; Irene Yah-Ling Sun; Guests: Barbara Baxley; Victor Buono; Joseph Campanella; Richard Carlson; Michael Paul Chan; Carole Demas
- Country of origin: United States
- Original language: English
- No. of seasons: 1
- No. of episodes: 7 (3 unaired)

Production
- Running time: 60 minutes

Original release
- Network: CBS
- Release: February 7 – February 28, 1975

Khan! is an American television detective series. Set in Chinatown, San Francisco, the titular character is a Chinese-American detective, played by Khigh Dhiegh. Khan's police contact was Lt. Gubbins, played by Vic Tayback. Series regulars were rounded out by his children Kim (played by Evan C. Kim) and Anna (Irene Yah-Ling Sun), who helped him solve crimes. Four episodes were aired in February 1975 on CBS; all seven of the produced episodes were aired during its Australian broadcast run on Channel Seven in 1976.

== Production and publicity ==
In November 1974, CBS announced the series would replace Planet of the Apes starting in February 1975, with Khigh Dhiegh filling the lead role. Khan was billed as a "wily Asian private investigator" who blended modern skills and technology (with help from his daughter and son) with his culture's innate wisdom.

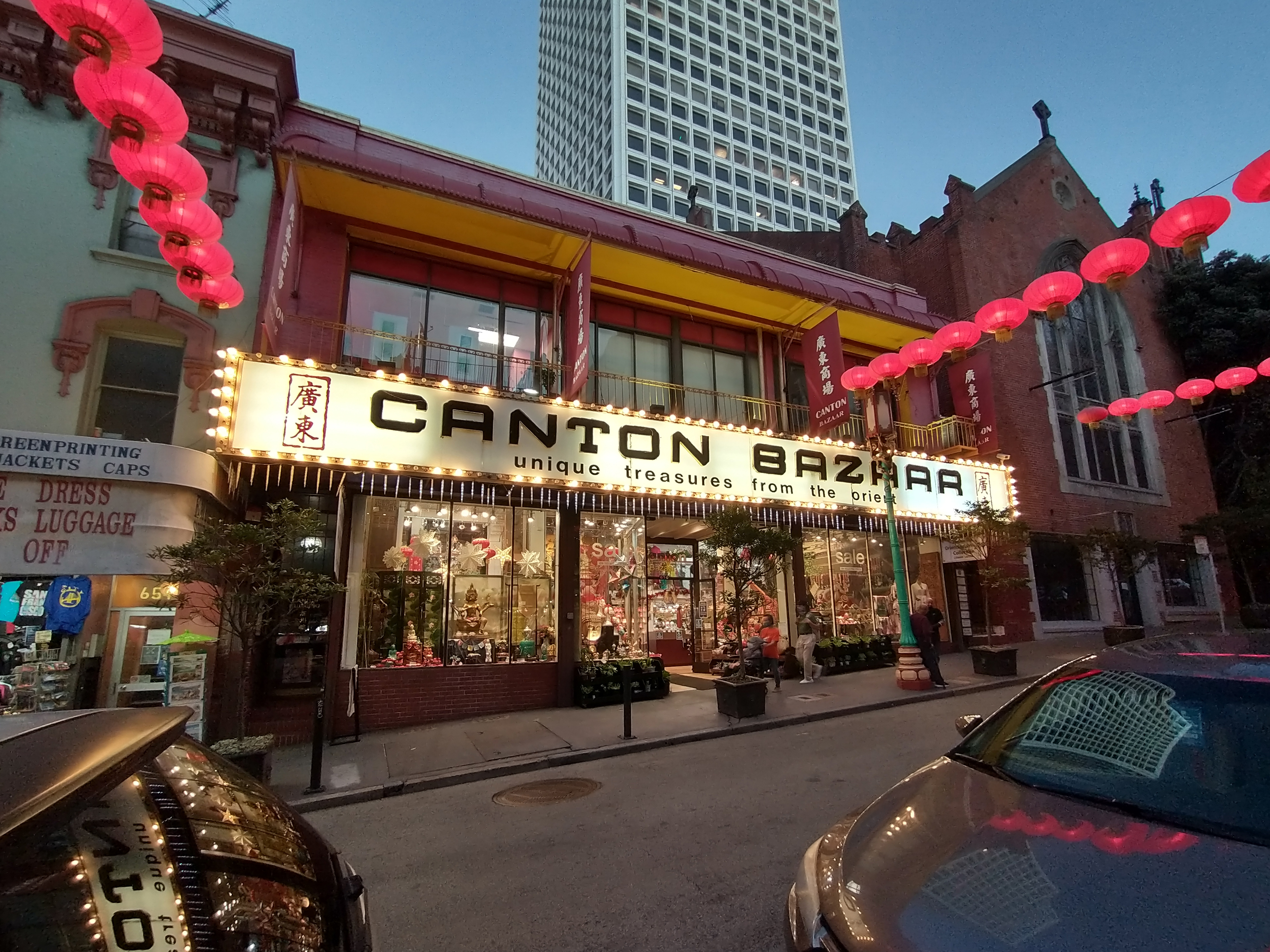
The Khan family lives in the apartment above Canton Bazaar at 616 Grant.

Dhiegh insisted on having no onscreen billing for his role, despite playing the title character. In an interview with Marilyn Beck to promote the show, he stated, "To be made the focal point of attention is something that disturbs me greatly. After all, we must remember it is not me, the individual, that is important. That is why I have told CBS I want no credits for the series. The goal is not to make any one person a star, but to create something that is good for all." He was selected for the role in November 1974.

Dhiegh's casting in Khan! and the 1974 TV movie Judge Dee in the Monastery drew criticism from Chinese American groups who felt that Dhiegh, whose real name was Kenneth Dickerson, was miscast in the role of a Chinese-American detective. The trend of casting of non-Asian actors in an Asian lead role had been established by Charlie Chan (played by Warner Oland and Sidney Toler), Mr. Moto (Peter Lorre), and Fu Manchu (Oland, Boris Karloff, and Nils Asther). Dhiegh, who was better known for portraying villains, was described as "only slightly Oriental" in a contemporary article, adding that "my mother was Chinese, Egyptian and Spanish; my father, Italian, Puerto Rican and Zulu. I am a mongrel."

== Reception ==
Criticism of the first episode centered on the writing and delivery by the show's lead. In a review published in the New York Daily News, Khan's detective skills are compared unfavorably to Charlie Chan's, noting the first case "gets solved despite him." The review also criticized Dhiegh for delivering lines "in a flat, dull monotone." Jay Sharbutt added the "plot [of the premiere episode] is so tiny it belongs in a fortune cookie" and said Dhiegh "[exudes] no signs of life. He probably took his cue from the script and direction of this show and maybe he should now give it back right now." Critic John Archibald also drew comparisons with Charlie Chan, concluding "the only thing Oriental about [Khan!] is that the plot was jaded." Tom Hopkins, reviewing the debut episode, wrote he had "scarfed up a few egg rolls that had more personality [than Dhiegh]. In fact, it's 60 minutes of absolutely nothing." Frank Swertlow, writing for United Press International, called the show "chop phooey" and singled out Dhiegh's performance, comparing him to "a windup buddha doll suffering from terminal constipation ... [reciting] his lines like a telegram." In John J. O'Connor's review for The New York Times, he called the script "an abomination" and added "the acting is dreadful [and] the production is stultifying", concluding that as the show was produced by the CBS Television Network, an antitrust suit had significant merit.

== Episodes ==
The first episode debuted on Friday, February 7, 1975. Based on poor critical responses, "Khan", the episode originally scheduled to be broadcast first, was pulled four hours before the premiere. "Mask of Deceit" ran instead as the debut episode. "Khan" was written by Edward J. Lakso, directed by Ivan Dixon, and produced by Laurence Heath.

After four out of seven episodes aired, CBS announced that Khan! would be cancelled and replaced by two half-hour comedies: The Friday Comedy Special and We'll Get By, starting in March. Khan! placed 59th out of 60 shows for the week of February 10–16, 1975, ahead of only Kung Fu.

Khan! made its Australian premiere on Saturday, April 24, 1976 with "Gift of Anger". The Australian run included all seven episodes that had been produced, including three that were not aired in America during the original run.

| No. | Title | Original release date |
|---|---|---|
| 1 | "Khan" / "Cloud of Guilt" | May 29, 1976 (Note: Air date in Australia; never broadcast in the US.) (Note: Scheduled for February 7, 1975 as the debut episode, but pulled four hours before broadcast and remained unaired until broadcast in Australia.) |
Khan is thrust into the world of professional football to search for a missing star quarterback accused of killing his girlfriend. Guest starring Thalmus Rasulala as Ed Porter (the quarterback), Clu Gulager and John Ireland as coaches, Joe Kapp and Roman Gabriel as football players, and Victor Buono as Cleery, a gambler. Retitled to "Cloud of Guilt" in Australia, aired May 29, 1976.
| 2 | "Mask of Deceit" | February 7, 1975 |
Khan calls upon his intimate knowledge of the Asian community to trail a mysterious swordsman wearing the mask of a secret Chinese society, thought to be behind the revenge murders of businessmen who were responsible for a factory fire that killed several workers. Guest stars include Joseph Campanella and Peter Haskell. Aired with same title in Australia on May 1, 1976.
| 3 | "Gift of Anger" | February 14, 1975 |
An irate father asks Khan to establish that a young medical intern murdered his daughter, though police believe that the evidence against the suspect is flimsy. Guest stars include Soon-Tek Oh, Michael Bell, Keye Luke, and David Rintoul. Aired with same title in Australia on April 24, 1976.
| 4 | "Triad" | February 21, 1975 |
The murder of a doctor who was a friend of Khan's leads to a crime syndicate that deals in both gambling and narcotics. Guest stars include George Takei and James Shigeta. Aired with same title in Australia on May 15, 1976.
| 5 | "A Game of Terror" | February 28, 1975 |
The evidence in a $7-million diamond heist carried out by helicopter points to a former British Intelligence agent who once saved Khan's life. Guest starring Patrick McNee and Barbara Baxley. Aired with same title in Australia on May 8, 1976.
| 6 | "Ransom" | May 22, 1976 |
Guest starring Mercedes McCambridge and John Colicos.
| 7 | "Jade Murder" / "Lost Identity" | June 5, 1976 |
A woman is murdered and her priceless jade seal is stolen. Guest starring Tisha Sterling. Retitled to "Lost Identity" in Australia.

== See also ==
- Ohara, a police procedural with a similar Asian American lead and premise
