= Convoy (TV series) =

- Genre: Drama
- Starring: John Gavin
- Country of origin: United States
- Original language: English
- No. of seasons: 1
- No. of episodes: 13

Production
- Running time: 60 minutes
- Production company: Universal TV

Original release
- Network: NBC
- Release: 17 September – 10 December 1965

Convoy is a 13-episode American television show set during World War II that appeared on NBC for the 1965–1966 television season.

The series starred John Gavin as Commander Dan Talbot of the US Navy destroyer escort DD-181 and John Larch as civilian merchant Captain Ben Foster of the cargo ship Flagship, who were involved with the convoy ships and their escorts that help to transport food, supplies and war materiel across the Atlantic during the Battle of the Atlantic.

The series also featured Linden Chiles as Steve Kirkland and James T. Callahan, formerly of ABC's Wendy and Me sitcom, in the role of Lieutenant O'Connell. Among the guest stars were Dennis Hopper, Jack Palance, Barbara Rush, James Doohan, Leslie Nielsen, Horst Ebersberg, Harold Gould, and Jeremy Slate.

== Production ==
A pilot was announced in late 1964.

NBC was worried about getting women into the series but research revealed that hundreds of females travelled in convoys. "The opportunity to exploit romance as well as action is obviously evident, and believe me we are going to take advantage of it", said writer-producer Frank Price.

Price called the show "technically... the greatest production challenge on the tube today. You can't fool TV audiences these days because they don't expect anything less, realistically or dramatically, from a TV episode than from a war movie."

The series relied heavily on stock footage from the war. This meant it could not be shot in color and Convoy was one of the last NBC series in black and white, even though NBC advertised itself as "The Full- Color Network." As a result, several NBC affiliates refused to clear the program. Price also travelled to San Diego to shoot 75,000 feet of footage involving ships that remained from World War II.

Former naval officer John Gavin admitted sometimes he had trouble with the dramatic licence taken by the writers.

The program rated poorly from the beginning, struggling against Hogan's Heroes, Gomer Pyle, U. S. M. C., The Addams Family, and Honey West and notice of its axing came after a few weeks.

== Episodes ==
No.	Title	Original release date
1	"Passage to Liverpool"	September 17, 1965
A mysterious radio beam threatens the safety of some 20 ships headed for England during the early part of World War II.
2	"Flight From Norway"	September 24, 1965
Dr. Elsa Aufricht (Dana Wynter), a beautiful German scientist, is captured and put on the DD-181 as it heads from Norway to England.
3	"Felicia"	October 1, 1965
Chief Officer Kirkland falls in love with a British Admiralty office worker during a special mission to London.
4	"The Many Colors of Courage"	October 8, 1965
An author (Jack Palance) proves that even heroes have fear as he and Chief Officer Kirkland battle a would-be saboteur.
5	"Lady on the Rock"	October 15, 1965
An American with the French underground (Eleanor Parker) temporarily resumes her pre-war romance with Captain Foster when they meet by chance in Gibraltar.
6	"The Duel"	October 22, 1965
The destroyer DD-181 first meets, then must do battle against a German cruiser helmed by Captain Kurt Von Krug (Edward Mulhare).
7	"Katya"	October 29, 1965
A Russian female officer (Diana Hyland) and Captain Foster fight and find romance on the high seas.
8	"Admiral Do-Right"	November 5, 1965
An overly-efficient young officer (Andrew Prine) nearly cracks when faced with a real crisis—a torpedo embedded in the ship's hull.
9	"Sink U-116!"	November 12, 1965
Commander Talbot is put in a running battle with the captain of a German submarine (Leslie Nielsen).
10	"The Heart of the Enemy"	November 19, 1965
A Jewish-American nurse (Diane Baker) is faced with caring for five Nazi survivors of a submarine sinking in the North Atlantic in 1942.
11	"No More Souvenirs"	November 26, 1965
Commander Talbot faces the unenviable task of telling a mother that her son has been killed in action.
12	"The Assassin"	December 3, 1965
A German soldier (Jeremy Slate) who has defected is sailing on a merchant ship to the United States and is the target of a Nazi-hired killer.
13	"The Man With the Saltwater Socks"	December 10, 1965
Commander Talbot attempts to deactivate a mine, while a young officer struggles to regain the respect of his crew members.
