= Evan C. Kim =

American entertainer (born 1953)

- Born: February 17, 1953 (age 73); New Jersey, U.S.
- Occupation: Actor
- Years active: 1975–2004

Evan C. Kim (born February 17, 1953) is an American actor. He is best known for playing Harry Callahan's partner Inspector Al Quan in the fifth and most recent Dirty Harry film, The Dead Pool (1988).

== Early and personal life ==
Kim was born in New Jersey to immigrant parents from South Korea. He developed a passion for martial arts (taekwondo) and writing when he was young; Kim has reflected on this.

one of your typical small, slow-to-grow kids. I was getting beat up, fairly often, and also ignored in school, so I found I needed to channel my feelings of revenge and hurt into something constructive.... Tae kwon do worked for becoming physically respected, and writing proved the means for periodically emptying the vessel.

== Career and roles ==
He also played Loo in the comedy The Kentucky Fried Movie (1977) in the segment "A Fistful of Yen", the interpreter Cowboy in the Vietnam War film Go Tell the Spartans (1978), the erudite caveman Nook in the cult comedy Caveman (1981), Suki in the B movie Megaforce (1982) and Tony in the miniseries V (1983). His other roles were in the films Hollywood Vice Squad (1986), Thousand Pieces of Gold (1991) and Loving Lulu (1992).

Kim was a regular in the short-lived series Khan! (1975) as the college-educated son of the titular character (played by Khigh Dhiegh), helping his father solve crimes alongside his sister (played by Irene Yah-Ling Sun). His television guest appearances include Kung Fu, CHiPs, Police Story, The Secrets of Isis, C.P.O. Sharkey, Fantasy Island, Serpico, Knight Rider, Sword of Justice, Matt Houston, Knots Landing, Max Headroom, Matlock and Alien Nation. Kim also directed an episode of Alien Nation.

== Filmography ==
Film
Year	Title	Role	Notes
1976	Baby Blue Marine	Harakawa	
1977	MacArthur	Major Akio Sakud	Uncredited
1977	The Kentucky Fried Movie	Loo	(segment "A Fistful of Yen")
1978	Go Tell the Spartans	Cowboy	
1981	Caveman	Nook	
1982	Megaforce	Suki	
1986	Hollywood Vice Squad	Chang	
1988	The Dead Pool	Inspector Al Quan	
1991	Thousand Pieces of Gold	Shun Lee	
1992	Loving Lulu	Mr. Moto	

Television
Year	Title	Role	Notes
1975	Kung Fu	Lieutenant (as Evan Kim)	Episode: "The Forbidden Kingdom"
1975	Police Story	Jerry Fong	Episode: "Year of the Dragon: Part 1 and 2" (as Evan Kim)
1975	Khan!	Kim Khan	4 episodes
1975	The Streets of San Francisco	Jack Kwan (as Evan Kim)	Episode: "Merchants of Death"
1976	The Secrets of Isis	C.J. Howe	2 episodes
1976	CPO Sharkey	Recruit Shimokawa (as Evan Kim)	Episode: "Shimokawa Ships Out"
1976	Serpico	Lee	Episode: "Dawn of the Furies"
1976	The Blue Knight	Mark	Episode: "The Great Wall of Chinatown"
1977	Space Sentinels	Mercury	13 episodes
1978	Switch	Ying	Episode: "The Tong"
1978	Kojak	Chok Low (as Evan Kim)	Episode: "No License to Kill"
1978	Sword of Justice	Jerry	Episode: "Aloha, Julie Lang"
1978	Fantasy Island	Sam	Episode: "Return/The Toughest Man Alive"
1980	CHiPs	Zale (as Evan Kim)	Episode: "The Strippers"
1982	Strike Force	Sam Chow (as Evan Kim)	Episode: "Chinatown"
1983	Matt Houston	Akiro	Episode: "The Rock and the Hard Place"
1983	Cocaine and Blue Eyes	Davey Huie (as Evan Kim)	TV movie
1983	V	Tony Wah Chong Leonetti (as Evan Kim)	TV miniseries
1984	Knots Landing	Lee Evans	Episode: "Finishing Touches"
1984	Knight Rider	Peter Wong (as Evan Kim)	Episode: "Knight of the Drones"
1985	Double Dare		Episode: "Hong Kong King Con"
1987	Stingray	Hal (as Evan Kim)	Episode: "Playback"
1988	Max Headroom	Mr. Chen (as Evan Kim)	Episode: "Neurostim"
1989	Matlock	Joseph Chan	Episode: "The Mayor: Part 1"
1989	Alien Nation	Dr. Lee	Episodes: "Pilot" and "Fountain of Youth"
1989	Island Son		Episode: "The State versus John Kulani"
1990	Jake and the Fatman	Tommy Lee	Episode: "Chinatown, My Chinatown"
1991	L.A. Law	Lee Chang	Episode: "As God Is My Co-Defendant"
2004	JAG	Lt. Wong	Episode: "What If"
