= Irene Yah-Ling Sun =

American actor and collector

Irene Yah-Ling Sun (born September 1, 1946) is an American actress. She is best known for her appearance as judoka Myrna Wong in the 1978 film Harper Valley PTA.

== Early life ==
Sun was born on September 1, 1946, in Shanghai, China and raised in Taiwan; her family later moved to Manhattan, where she studied ballet.

== Career ==
Sun made her stage debut as a dancer in Flower Drum Song, followed by The World of Suzie Wong.

Sun was a series regular in the short-lived Khan! (1975), as Anna, the daughter of the titular character (played by Khigh Dhiegh), helping her father solve crimes alongside her brother Kim (played by Evan C. Kim). Other television guest spots include appearances in Hawaii Five-O, The Rockford Files, and Quincy, M.E.

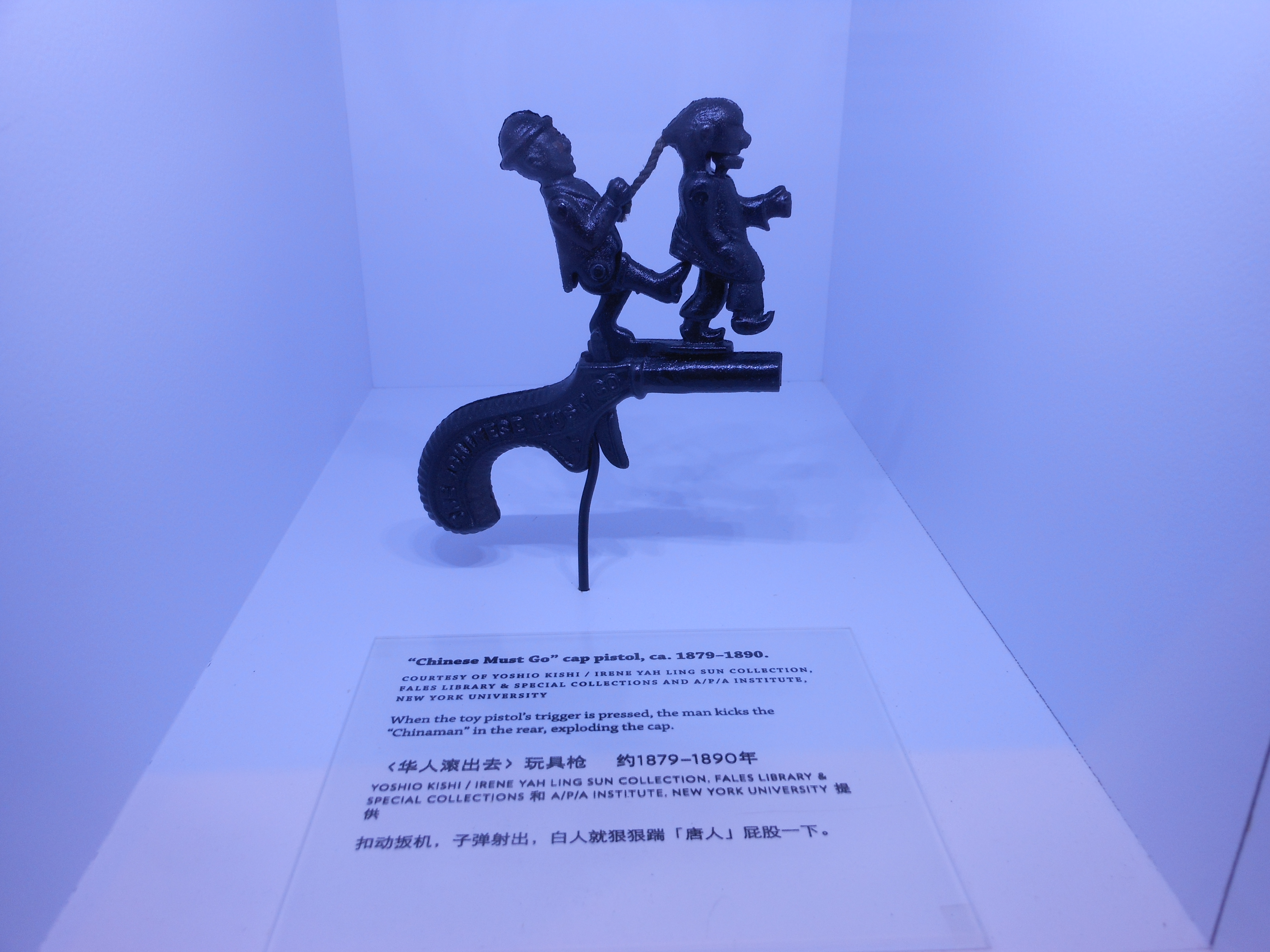
"Chinese Must Go" cap pistol, c.1879–1890; Yoshio Kishi / Irene Yah Ling Sun Collection, Fales Library, New York University

She also helped assemble an extensive collection of memorabilia depicting how Asian Americans have been portrayed in popular culture along with her friend, the film editor, writer, and book dealer Yoshio Kishi. The collection was acquired by the Asian/Pacific/American Studies Program and Institute of New York University in 2003, and a portion was exhibited in 2005 as "Archivist of the 'Yellow Peril'", at NYU (Feb 3 – Jul 31) and MoCA (Aug 16 – Dec 31).

In 2017, Sun appeared in a nonspeaking role (as "Grandma") in a short public service spot commissioned by DDB San Francisco for Energy Upgrade California, directed by Bradley G Munkowitz (GMUNK).

== Personal life ==
She is an accomplished chef, specializing in Chinese dishes.

== Filmography ==
Film
Year	Title	Role	Notes
1976	The Quest	China	Television movie/pilot episode for the subsequent television series
1978	The Courage and the Passion	Tuyet Berkle	Television movie
1978	Harper Valley PTA	Myrna Wong	Credited as Irene Yah Ling Sun
1983	Inspector Perez	Lisa Soong	Television movie
1983	Savage in the Orient	Tap Lee	Television movie

Television
Year	Title	Role	Notes
1963	Armstrong Circle Theatre	Chan Po Lin/Poh Lin	Episode: "The Journey of Poh Lin"
1963	The Doctors	Nurse Lee Chan	Episode: "So Far from Home"
1966	Preview Tonight	Zooney	Episode: "The Cliff Dwellers"
1975	Khan!	Anna Khan	4 episodes
1976	Police Woman	Princess Hanako	Episode: "The Trick Book"
1976	The Quest	China	Episode: "Welcome to America, Jade Snow"
1976	Hawaii Five-O	Lee Mei Liu	Episode: "Yes, My Deadly Daughter"
1976	Most Wanted	Ngo Luc Liu	Episode: "The Ten-Percenter"
1977	The Rockford Files	Pham Vam Mai	Episode: "New Life, Old Dragons"
1977	Quincy, M.E.	Takayo Kamura	Episode: "Touch of Death"
1978	Hawaii Five-O	Marla Kahuana	Episode: "Deadly Courier"
1978	The Incredible Hulk	May Chuan	Episode: "Another Path"
1980	Hawaii Five-O	Nadira	Episode: "The Golden Noose"
1980	Love of Life	Kim Soo Ling	
1981	The Incredible Hulk	Tam	Episode: "East Winds"
1981	Magnum, P.I.	Mitsu McWilliams	Episode: "The Taking of Dick Williams"
1982	Magnum, P.I.	Marissa, the Singer	Episode: "Flashback"
1983	Family Ties	Tanly Nguyen	Episode: "I Gotta Be Ming"
1984	Airwolf	Nhi Houng	Episode: "Daddy's Gone a Hunt'n"
1984	Call to Glory	Dieu Quang	Episode: "Go/No Go"
1986	Scarecrow and Mrs. King	Tranh Sen	Episode: "The Man Who Died Twice"
1991	The New Adam-12	Mrs. Lee	Episode: "Trick-or-Treat"
1991	MacGyver	Loretta Fielding	Episode: "The Coltons"
1991	Secret Bodyguard	Aunt Edith	Episode: "Secret Bodyguard"
1997	Sunset Beach	Mrs. Chang	8 episodes
2004	The Stones	Joan	Episode: "Pilot"
