= Many Happy Returns (TV series) =

- Created by: Parke Levy
- Starring: John McGiver; Elinor Donahue; Mark Goddard; Elena Verdugo; Mickey Manners
- Theme music composer: David Rose; Parke Levy
- Composer: Pete Rugolo
- Country of origin: United States
- No. of seasons: 1
- No. of episodes: 26

Production
- Producer: Parke Levy
- Camera setup: Multi-camera
- Running time: 30 minutes
- Production companies: Lindabob Productions; MGM Television

Original release
- Network: CBS
- Release: September 21, 1964 – April 12, 1965

Many Happy Returns is an American sitcom that ran on CBS for twenty-six episodes, from September 21, 1964 to April 12, 1965. General Foods sponsored it from 9:30 to 10 Eastern Time on Monday nights.

== Personnel ==
The show starred John McGiver as widower Walter Burnley, the manager of the Adjustments and Refunds Department at the fictitious Krockmeyer's Department Store in Los Angeles. Elinor Donahue played Burnley's daughter, Joan Randall. Mark Goddard played Joan's husband, Bob Randall. The Randalls' daughter, Laurie, was played by Andrea Sacino.

Elena Verdugo played complaint department employee Lynn Hall, with Richard Collier as Harry Price, Jesslyn Fax as Wilma Fritter, and Mickey Manners as Joe Foley, all store employees. Doris Packer played Cornelia. Russell Collins was cast as Burnley's demanding, often unreasonable boss, Owen Sharp.

Parke Levy was the program's creator and executive producer. Directors included Theodore J. Flicker, Stanley Z. Cherry, and Sherman Marks. Writers included Earl Barret, Hannibal Coons, Sid Dorfman, Phil Green, Harvey Helm, Albert E. Lewin, Norman Paul, and Harry Winkler.

David Rose and Levy composed the show's theme.

== Production ==
Many Happy Returns was produced by MGM Studios and Lindabob Productions. Episodes were filmed in black-and-white with a laugh track.

== Episodes ==
No.	Title	Directed by	Written by	Original release date
1	"Many Happy Returns"	Sherman Marks	Parke Levy & Norman Paul	September 21, 1964
Walter gets involved in a spat between a newlywed and her in-laws, only for his family to get the impression he's the one planning to run away with the new bride.
2	"Walter Meets the Machine"	Unknown	Unknown	September 28, 1964
When Walter's complaint department is set to be replaced by a computer named IRMA, it's up to him to show Sharp that a human being has advantages over technology.
3	"It Shouldn't Happen to a Dog"	Unknown	Unknown	October 5, 1964
A lady returns a dog to the department store, and Walter gives it to his granddaughter. Then the lady's angry husband demands the dog be returned.
4	"Bye, Bye Cupid"	Unknown	Unknown	October 12, 1964
Sharp schemes to play Cupid for his single sister and an unsuspecting Walter.
5	"Burnley at the Bridge"	Unknown	Unknown	October 19, 1964
When Lynn announces her engagement to a soldier, Walter takes on the role of a protective father figure.
6	"Joe's Place"	Unknown	Unknown	October 26, 1964
Joan plans an elegant dinner party...but Walter isn't on the guest list.
7	"The Best Seller"	Unknown	Unknown	November 9, 1964
Walter hatches a plot to improve the book sales of a struggling author.
8	"Mother Burnley's Chickens"	Unknown	Unknown	November 16, 1964
Walter gets to understand Harry's nerves firsthand, when he's asked to babysit---for Harry's eight kids.
9	"Krockmeyer on Avon"	Unknown	Unknown	November 23, 1964
Joe dreams of being an actor---so he plans on quitting the department store.
10	"East is West"	Unknown	Unknown	November 30, 1964
Walter is tasked with luring the account of a Japanese camera maker to the store, which is easier said than done with the language and cultural barriers.
11	"The House Divided"	Theodore J. Flicker	Story by : Sidney Green & Harvey Helm, Teleplay by : Sid Dorfman & Parke Levy	December 7, 1964
A man suffers a fall in the store and sues, with Walter's son-in-law Bob representing him.
12	"The Fashion Show"	Unknown	Unknown	December 14, 1964
The store offers up a fashion show for the customers, but a demanding fashion designer steamrolls the store staff with her demands.
13	"The Shoplifter"	Unknown	Unknown	December 21, 1964
Walter knows a woman is shoplifting from the store in order to return the goods for cash, but the trouble is proving it.
14	"The Surprise Visit"	Unknown	Unknown	December 28, 1964
Returns are down, and Walter thinks his staff deserves a raise. Sharp instead wants to fire someone.
15	"Taming of the Beast"	Unknown	Unknown	January 4, 1965
It's a race against the clock: Wilma's cats are having kittens, but her building is being demolished at the same time.
16	"No Nose is Good Nose"	Unknown	Unknown	January 11, 1965
It's many happy returns for Sharp on his birthday, but Walter's plans to throw a surprise party hit a snag with the arrival of an efficiency expert: Sharp's nephew (Arte Johnson).
17	"Foster Father of the Bride"	Unknown	Unknown	January 18, 1965
When Lynn's soldier fiancé calls off the wedding, Walter impersonates a general to find out why.
18	"The Diamond"	Unknown	Unknown	January 25, 1965
Walter plays mediator for a young couple, forbidden to marry by the girl's status-conscious father.
19	"Three on a Honeymoon"	Unknown	Unknown	February 1, 1965
A pair of newlyweds find themselves stranded in the store after closing time, and Walter works to salvage their honeymoon.
20	"Pop Goes the Easel"	Unknown	Unknown	February 8, 1965
Walter's brush with the art world turns sour, when the canvas he gave a struggling artist to use turns out to be a priceless painting owned by Sharp's wife.
21	"The Krockmeyer Caper"	Unknown	Unknown	February 15, 1965
Walter buys a golf bag someone returned to the store, unaware that a pair of crooks have their loot hidden away inside.
22	"Big White Lie"	Unknown	Unknown	March 8, 1965
When Sharp unknowingly insults an Italian businesswoman, jeopardizing the store's merger plans, Walter has to impersonate Sharp to try and smooth things over
23	"Idol Threats"	Unknown	Unknown	March 22, 1965
A superstitious customer returns an ivory figurine that he says is hexed, which turns the store upside down with a string of unfortunate coincidences.
24	"A Date for Walter"	Unknown	Unknown	March 29, 1965
Joe's job is in jeopardy, and the root cause turns out to be his girlfriend's mother.
25	"The Woodsman"	Gene Reynolds	Earl Barret	April 5, 1965
The urbane Walter meets his match in the great outdoors when he volunteers to take two neglected boys camping.
26	"It's a Gift"	Stanley Z. Cherry	Albert E. Lewin & Burt Styler	April 12, 1965
Walter inserts himself as peacemaker in a lover's spat between his nephew and the nephew's wife. But the inexpensive peace offering he orders for the wife is instead delivered as a $300 dress.

== History ==
Many Happy Returns ran opposite The Bing Crosby Show on ABC and The Andy Williams Show on NBC. It was replaced by reruns of The Danny Thomas Show.

== See also ==
- 1964-65 United States network television schedule
