= Thomas Jarrold =

English physician

- Born: 1 December 1770; Manningtree, Essex
- Died: 24 June 1853 (aged 82); Manchester
- Occupation: Physician

Thomas Jarrold (1 December 1770 – 24 June 1853) was an English physician.

== Biography ==
Jarrold born at Manningtree, Essex, on 1 December 1770. He was educated at Edinburgh, where he is said to have taken his degree of M.D., though his name does not appear in the published list of graduates. He was in practice at Stockport, Cheshire, in 1806, and soon afterwards removed to Manchester, where he died on 24 June 1853. He was buried at the Congregational Chapel, Grosvenor Street. He was twice married, his first wife Susanna dying on 12 March 1817, aged 51, and the second at Norwich in 1886, aged 91. His son, Edgar T. Jarrold, died at New York on 25 February 1890.

Jarrold published:

- ‘Dissertations on Man … in answer to Mr. Malthus's Essay on the Principle of Population,’ Stockport, 1806, 8vo, pp. 367.
- ‘A Letter to Samuel Whitbread, M.P. … on the Poor's Laws,’ 1807, 8vo, pp. 32.
- ‘Anthropologia, or Dissertations on the Form and Colour of Man,’ Stockport, 1808, 4to, pp. 261.
- ‘An Inquiry into the Causes of the Curvature of the Spine,’ 1823, 8vo.
- ‘Instinct and Reason philosophically investigated, with a view to ascertain the Principles of the Science of Education,’ Manchester, 1836, 8vo, pp. 348.
- ‘Education of the People,’ pt. i., Manchester, 1847, 8vo.

He was a member of the Manchester Literary and Philosophical Society, and in 1811 contributed to its ‘Memoirs’ a paper on ‘National Character’ (2nd series, ii. 328).
