= Michael Flynn (businessman) =

Irish businessperson

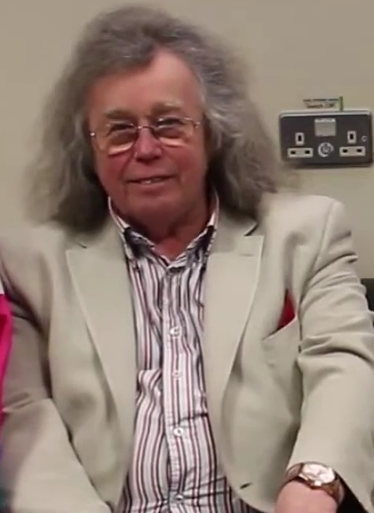
- Flynn in 2016
- Born: Michael Austin Flynn; 1950 or 1951 (age 74–75); Dublin, Ireland
- Known for: Owner of Mattress Mick
- Spouse: Margaret (d. 2023)
- Children: 2

Michael Austin Flynn (born 1950/1951), also known as Mattress Mick, is an Irish businessman. He is the owner of Mattress Mick, a chain of mattress stores in Ireland.

== Career ==
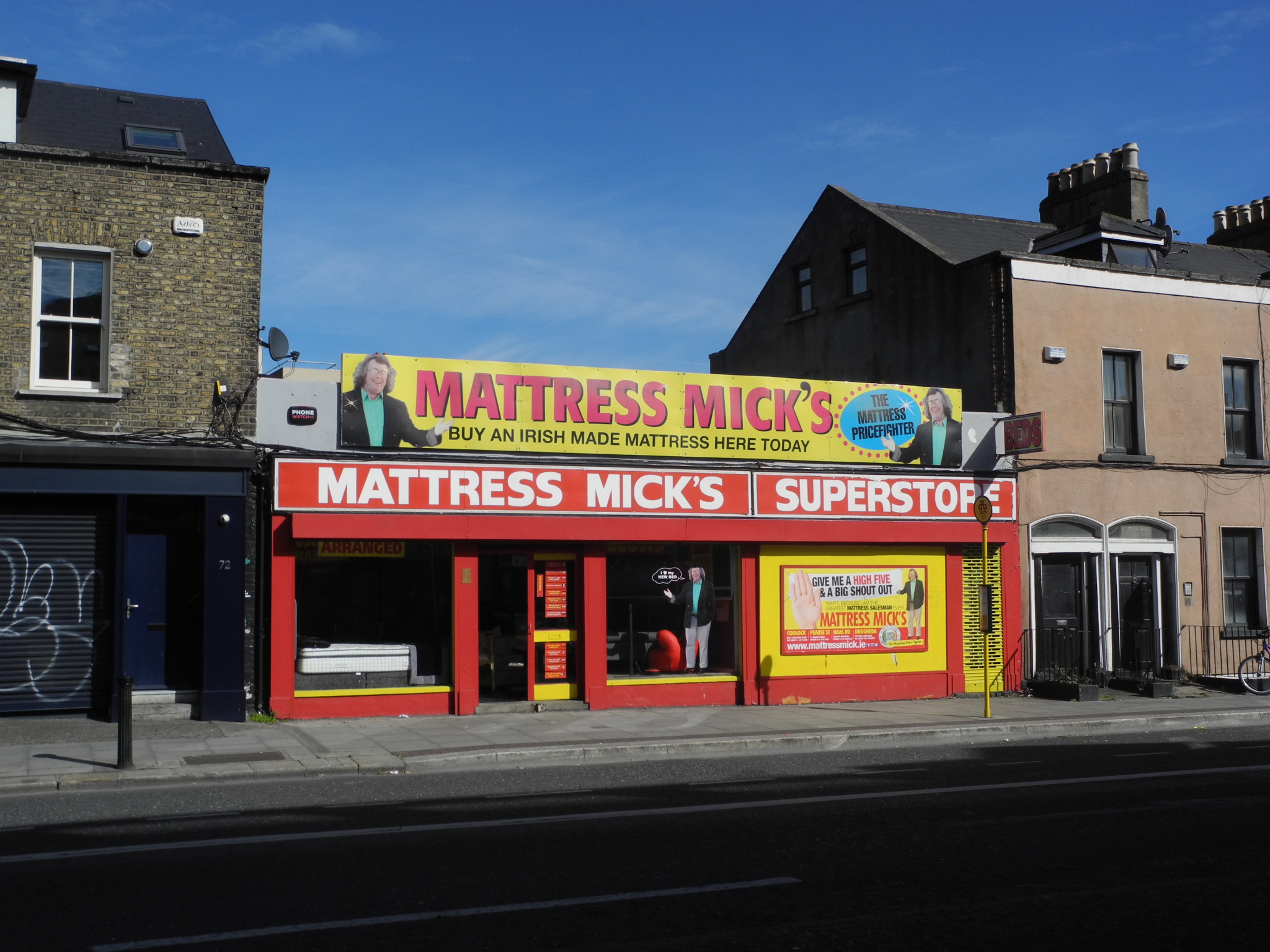
A Mattress Mick store in Dublin

Flynn was born and raised in Dublin. His grandfather owned a shop on Pearse Street, which Flynn still owns today. His father owned a fishing supply shop. Flynn worked for Royal Trust Company in Dublin before he started selling furniture, bottled gas and drapery. He owned eight furniture stores in Dublin during the 2000s, but due to the Great Recession he closed down his company.

After this, Flynn began to focus on selling mattresses. He collaborated with Paul Kelly and director Colm Quinn to create the persona of "Mattress Mick", which he named his mattress stores after. He recorded a rap song as Mattress Mick, which went viral. Flynn's advertisements and videos as Mattress Mick have received media attention, including a song with Richie Kavanagh and a Star Wars themed advertisement. In 2015, comedian Stephen Fry commented that he "wanted to meet" Mattress Mick. He was named as one of the most popular Irish accounts on TikTok in 2022.

He has starred in ads for Lucozade Zero.

Flynn was the subject of the 2016 movie Mattress Men, which he starred in. The movie was nominated for the George Morrison Feature Documentary award in the Irish Film and Television Awards in 2017, and went on to win the award. A musical based on his life ran at the Liberty Hall Theatre in 2023.

== Personal life ==
Flynn met his wife Margaret (née Fitzpatrick) in the 1980s when she applied for a job at the Mace convenience shop he ran in Ringsend. The couple were married until Margaret's death in 2023, and they had two daughters.

In 2019, Flynn revealed that he had been approached to take part in the Irish version of Dancing with the Stars. He appeared as Donald Trump in an episode of Republic of Telly.

=== Activism and politics ===
During the occupation of Apollo House, Flynn provided mattresses to the homeless people occupying the building. As part of his business, Flynn has run the Mick's Community Chest initiative, which donates a sum of money to a charity every month.

Flynn endorsed Jennifer Carroll MacNeill during the 2019 Dún Laoghaire–Rathdown County Council election.

Flynn alleged he had been approached to run for Dublin City Council with the aim of becoming Lord Mayor of Dublin, but he declined to run. He denied rumours that he was planning to run in the 2018 Irish presidential election.

== Bibliography ==
- Flynn, Michael; McCaffrey, Josephine (2025). Memoirs of a Mattress Salesman. Gill Books. ISBN 9781804583852.
