= John McGiver =

American actor (1913–1975)

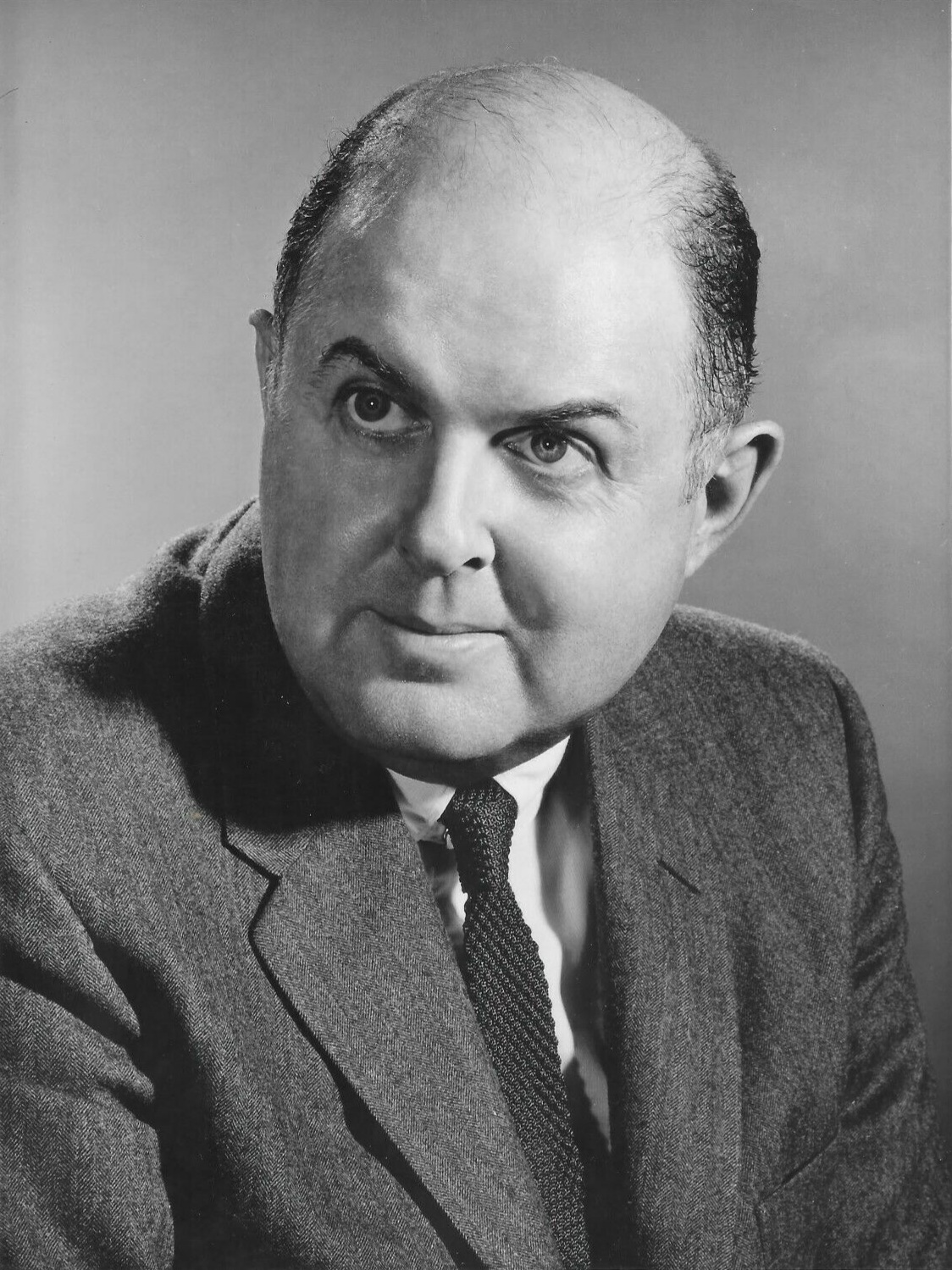
- McGiver in Many Happy Returns (1964)
- Born: John Irwin McGiver; November 5, 1913; New York City, U.S.
- Died: September 9, 1975 (aged 61); West Fulton, New York, U.S.
- Education: Fordham University; Columbia University; Catholic University of America
- Occupation: Actor
- Years active: 1955–1975
- Spouse: Ruth Schmigelsky (m. 1947)
- Children: 10, including actor Boris McGiver
- Military career
- Allegiance: United States
- Branch: United States Army
- Unit: 7th Armored Division
- Conflicts: World War II

John Irwin McGiver (November 5, 1913 – September 9, 1975) was an American character actor who made more than a hundred appearances in television and motion pictures over a two-decade span from 1955 to 1975.

The owl-faced, portly actor was frequently mistaken for an Englishman due to his Northeastern elite accent and precise diction. Accordingly, McGiver was often cast as pompous Englishmen and other stuffy, aristocratic and bureaucratic types. He was known for his performances in such films as Breakfast at Tiffany's (1961); The Manchurian Candidate (1962), Who's Minding the Store? (1963), Man's Favorite Sport? (1964) and Midnight Cowboy (1969). He appeared in many television shows and commercials during the 1960s and early 1970s, including the first of a long running popular series of commercials for the American Express charge card ("Do you know me?").

== Early life ==
McGiver was born in Manhattan, New York City to Irish immigrants, Patrick Francis McGiver (1871–1942) and Bridget Frances McGiver (née Irwine, 1871–1954). He graduated from the Jesuit-run Regis High School on the Upper East Side in 1932.

He earned a Bachelor of Arts degree (B.A.) in English from Fordham University in 1938 and master's degrees from Columbia University and Catholic University. He became an English teacher and worked as an actor and director in New York's Irish Repertory Theater. He interrupted those activities and enlisted in the U.S. Army in 1942 and served as an officer in the U.S. Army's 7th Armored Division in Europe during World War II. Returning to civilian life, he continued to teach English and speech at Christopher Columbus High School in the Bronx and worked occasionally in off-Broadway plays until 1955, when he became a full-time actor.

== Career ==
He appeared in the Alfred Hitchcock Presents episodes "Six People No Music" and "Fatal Figures", and the Twilight Zone episodes "Sounds and Silences" and "The Bard". In 1971, he guest-starred in Alias Smith and Jones (season 1, episode 8, 'A Fistful of Diamonds'). In 1964, he appeared in Man's Favorite Sport?. Between 1963 and 1964, McGiver appeared in five episodes of The Patty Duke Show as J.R. Castle, who was Martin Lane's boss at the fictional newspaper The Chronicle.

His most recognized film roles came in 1961–62 when he appeared in The Manchurian Candidate as the principled, incorruptible Senator Jordan, and as a wistful jewelry salesman in Breakfast at Tiffany's. McGiver later played the role of an unhinged religious fanatic, Mr. O'Daniel, in the 1969 film Midnight Cowboy and a small role in Lucille Ball's Mame. He was also in an episode of Gilligan's Island in 1966, "The Man With a Net". He also made one guest appearance on ABC's hit fantasy sitcom Bewitched.

== Personal life ==
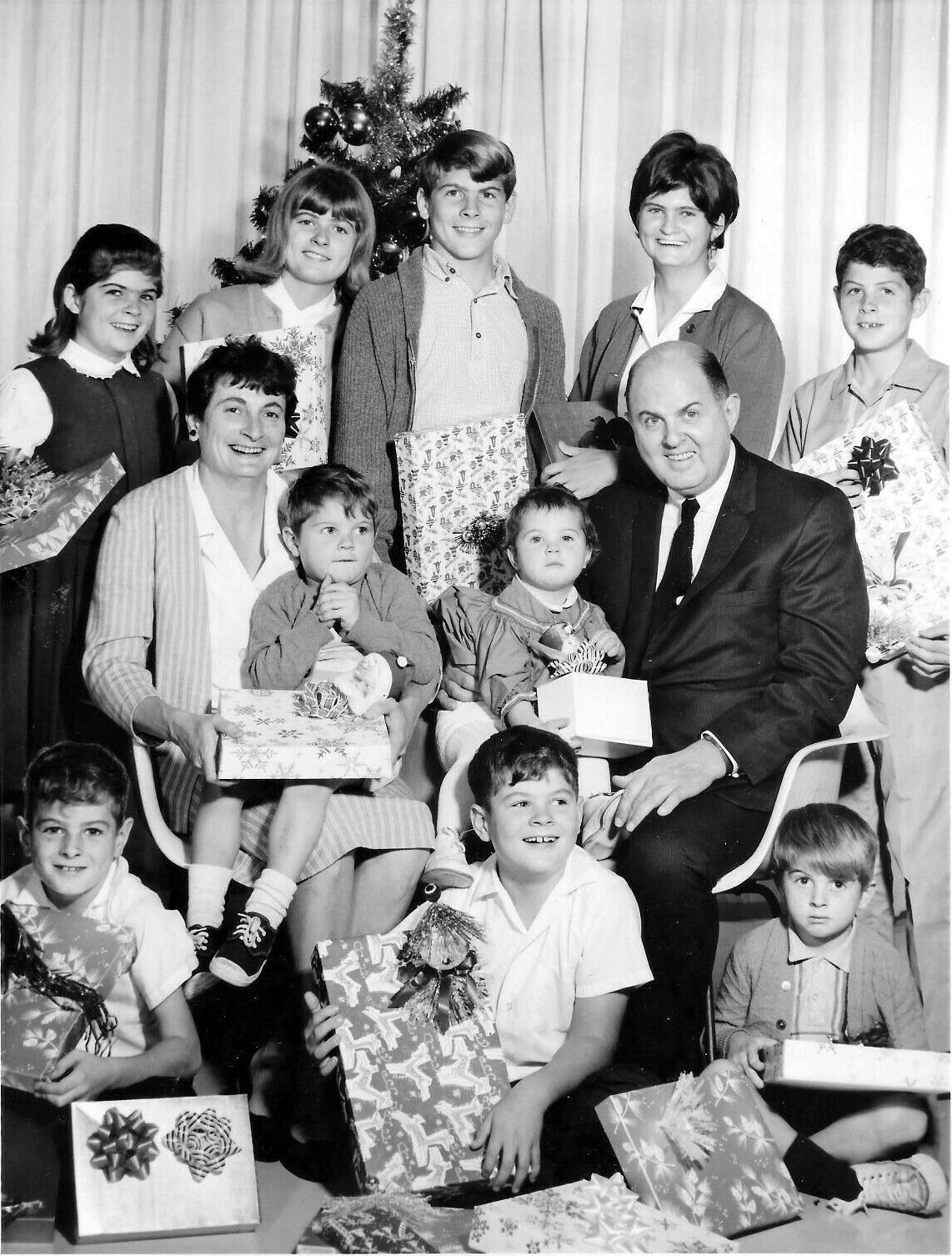
McGiver with his wife Ruth and children on Christmas, 1964.

McGiver was married to Ruth Schmigelsky from 1947 until his death; they had ten children: Brigit, Maria, Terry, Basil, Clare, Oliver, Ian, Clemens, Boris, and Cornelia. Boris, the ninth child in the McGivers' large family, followed in his father's footsteps, working as a professional actor in films and on television since 1987.

== Death ==
McGiver, at age 61, died of a heart attack on September 9, 1975, at his home in West Fulton, New York. His remains were cremated.

== Selected filmography ==
- The Man in the Raincoat (1957) — O'Brien
- Love in the Afternoon (1957) (with Gary Cooper, Audrey Hepburn and Maurice Chevalier) — Monsieur X
- I Married a Woman (1958; filmed in 1956) — Girard, Sutton's Lawyer
- Once Upon a Horse... (1958) — Mr. Tharp
- The Gazebo (1959) (with Glenn Ford and Debbie Reynolds) — Sam Thorpe
- Love in a Goldfish Bowl (1961) — Dr. Frawley
- Breakfast at Tiffany's (1961) (with Audrey Hepburn and George Peppard) — Tiffany's Salesman
- Bachelor in Paradise (1961) (with Bob Hope) — Austin Palfrey
- Mr. Hobbs Takes a Vacation (1962) (with James Stewart and Maureen O'Hara) — Martin Turner
- The Manchurian Candidate (1962) (with Frank Sinatra, Laurence Harvey and Janet Leigh) — Senator Thomas Jordan
- Period of Adjustment (1962) (with Jane Fonda and Jim Hutton) — Stewart P. McGill
- Who's Got the Action? (1962) (with Dean Martin and Lana Turner) — Judge Fogel
- Something's Got to Give (1962) (aborted Marilyn Monroe film) — The Judge
- My Six Loves (1963) (with Debbie Reynolds) — Judge Harris
- Johnny Cool (1963) (with Henry Silva and Elizabeth Montgomery) — Oscar B. 'Oby' Hinds
- Take Her, She's Mine (1963) (with James Stewart and Sandra Dee) — Hector G. Ivor
- Who's Minding the Store? (1963) (with Jerry Lewis) — Mr. John P. Tuttle
- Man's Favorite Sport? (1964) (with Rock Hudson and Paula Prentiss) — William Cadwalader
- A Global Affair (1964) (with Bob Hope) — Mr. Snifter
- Marriage on the Rocks (1965) (with Frank Sinatra, Deborah Kerr and Dean Martin) — Shad Nathan
- Made in Paris (1966) (Louis Jourdan) — Roger Barclay
- The Glass Bottom Boat (1966) (with Doris Day and Rod Taylor) — Ralph Goodwin
- The Spirit Is Willing (1967) (with Sid Caesar and Vera Miles) — Uncle George
- Fitzwilly (1967) (with Dick Van Dyke) — Albert
- Midnight Cowboy (1969) (with Jon Voight and Dustin Hoffman) — Mr. O'Daniel
- Lawman (1971) (with Burt Lancaster) — Sabbath Mayor Sam Bolden
- Arnold (1973) (with Roddy McDowall) — Governor
- Mame (1974) (with Lucille Ball) — Mr. Babcock
- The Apple Dumpling Gang (1975) (with Don Knotts and Tim Conway) — Leonard Sharpe

=== Television ===
McGiver was a regular performer on:

- McKeever & the Colonel (1962–1963) (6 episodes)
  - Season 1 Episode 9: "Blackwell's Stand" (1962)
  - Season 1 Episode 17: "The Neighbor" (1963)
  - Season 1 Episode 18: "Love Comes to Westfield" (1963)
  - Season 1 Episode 19: "The Big Charade" (1963)
  - Season 1 Episode 21: "All Quiet on the Westfield Front" (1963)
  - Season 1 Episode 23: "Make Room for Mother" (1963)
- Many Happy Returns (1964–1965) (26 episodes) as Walter Burnley (lead role)
- Mr. Terrific (1967) (17 episodes) as Barton J. Reed
- The Jimmy Stewart Show (1971–1972) (24 episodes) as Dr. Luther Quince

McGiver also appeared on:

- Alfred Hitchcock Presents (1958–1959)
  - (Season 3 Episode 29: "Fatal Figures") (1958) as Harold George Goames
  - (Season 4 Episode 13: "Six People, No Music") (1959) as Arthur Motherwell
- The Tab Hunter Show (1960) (Season 1 Episode 3: "My Brother, the Hero") as Mr. Kleeber
- The Barbara Stanwyck Show (1961) (Season 1 Episode 23: "The Golden Acres") as Collins
- Bonanza (1961) (Season 3 Episode 15: "Land Grab") as Colonel Jonathan Bragg
- The Twilight Zone (1963–1964)
  - (Season 4 Episode 18: "The Bard") (1963) as Shannon
  - (Season 5 Episode 27: "Sounds and Silences") (1964) as Roswell G. Flemington
- The Lucy Show (1963–1964)
  - (Season 1 Episode 7: "Lucy is a Kangaroo for a Day") (1963) as Mr. Irwin
  - (Season 2 Episode 23: "Lucy is Her Own Lawyer") (1964) as Judge
- The Patty Duke Show (1963–1964) (5 episodes) as J.R. Castle
  - (Season 1 Episode 0: "Pilot") (1963)
  - (Season 1 Episode 3: "The Eloquent") (1963)
  - (Season 1 Episode 15: "The Christmas Present") (1963)
  - (Season 1 Episode 16: "Auld Lang Syne") (1964)
  - (Season 1 Episode 36: "The Cousins") (1964)
- The Fugitive (1964) (Season 1 Episode 30: "The End Game") as Jake Devlin
- The Beverly Hillbillies (1964) (Season 2 Episode 25: "Granny Versus the Weather Bureau") as Justin Addison
- The Rogues (1965) (Season 1 Episode 29: "Mr. White's Christmas") as Horatio T. White
- Voyage to the Bottom of the Sea (1965) (Season 2 Episode 11: "The X Factor") as Alexander Corby
- The Dick Van Dyke Show (1965) (Season 5 Episode 12: "See Rob Write, Write Rob Write") as Ollie Wheelright
- Gidget (1966) (Season 1 Episode 28: "One More for the Road") as Franklin Whiting
- The Man from U.N.C.L.E. (1966) (Season 2 Episode 28: "The Birds and the Bees Affair") as Mr. Mozart
- I Dream of Jeannie (1966) (Season 2 Episode 15: "Jeannie Breaks the Bank") as Wilfred
- Gilligan's Island (1966) (Season 3 Episode 7: "Man With a Net") as Lord Beasley Waterford
- Honey West (1966) (Season 1 Episode 17: "How Brillig, O, Beamish Boy") as Mr. Brillig
- The Wild Wild West (1967) (Season 3 Episode 13: "The Night of the Turncoat") as Elisha Calamander
- The High Chaparral (1968) (Season 2 Episode 7: "Ebenezer") as Ebenezer Binns
- Bewitched (1971) (Season 7 Episode 14: "Mother-in-Law of the Year") as Bernard Bobbins owner of Bobbins Bonbons
- Alias Smith and Jones (1971–1972)
  - (Season 1 Episode 8: "A Fistful of Diamonds") (1971) as August Binford
  - (Season 3 Episode 11: "Witness to a Lynching") (1972) as Doc Snively
- Twas the Night Before Christmas as The Mayor (voice only)
- Ellery Queen (1975) (Season 1 Episode 6: "The Adventure of Miss Aggie's Farewell Performance") as Mr. Pearl (final appearance)

== Stage ==
Broadway theatre roles included:

- A Thurber Carnival, 1960
- The Front Page, 1969–1970
