= Mickie Finn's (TV series) =

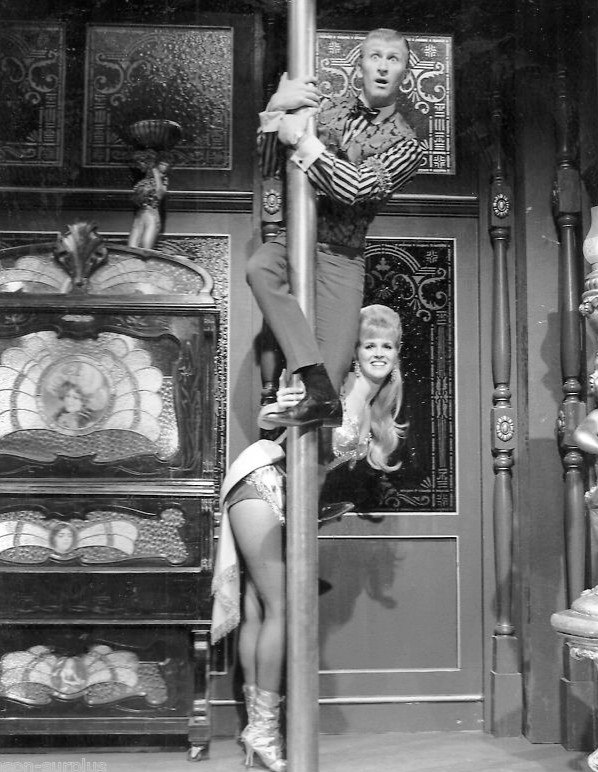
- Fred and Mickie Finn, 1966.
- Genre: Variety show
- Created by: Fred E. Finn
- Starring: Fred E. Finn; Mickie Finn
- Country of origin: United States
- No. of seasons: 1
- No. of episodes: 16 episodes

Production
- Production locations: Burbank, California
- Running time: 30 minutes
- Production company: Finn-A-Y Productions

Original release
- Network: NBC
- Release: April 21 – September 1, 1966

Mickie Finn's was a summer replacement variety series for the failed NBC sitcom Mona McCluskey, which had starred Juliet Prowse and Denny Miller on Thursday nights. The variety program was based on the San Diego nightclub of the same name.

== Backstory ==
Fred Finn had been performing an outdoors show at a yacht club in San Diego in 1965 when he was approached by a television producer, who asked if Fred would like to do a TV show. This same producer later came by the nightclub with NBC executives to see the entire act. They were all so impressed that they decided to give Mickie Finn's a chance as a TV series.

== Production ==
This half-hour musical variety series was co-hosted by Fred Finn (his real name) and his wife, Mickie Finn (a stage name). The music played by the house band (Tony "Spider" Marillo on drums, Stormy Gormley on tuba & cello, "Dimples" Bobby Jensen on left-handed trumpet, Owen Leinhard on trombone, and "Cugar" Nelson on trombone) ranged from current hits to ragtime to Dixieland jazz. In addition to the guest stars, the regular cast included Fred as the proprietor who played piano, Mickie who played banjo, and the Dapper Dans, a barbershop quartet who also did comedy bits. Harold "Hoot" Connors and Mickey Manners were the bartenders and bouncers who provided comic relief.

The set on which this series was taped was a replica of the San Diego nightclub, re-created in NBC's studios at a cost of $50,000. A scenic designer had made countless sketches and photos of the original club to ensure a faithful duplication; details included such things as the long, narrow tables with red-checkered tablecloths, the moose heads on the wall, and signs like Keep Cool with Coolidge. The show's Nielsen ratings were better than for its sitcom predecessor, but would likely have been even better had its timeslot not been the same as ABC's primetime soap-opera hit Peyton Place.

Sixteen episodes were produced by the Finn-A-Y Company (Fred Finn in a joint venture with game show producers Ralph Andrews and Bill Yagemann as the A-Y) in conjunction with NBC, and broadcast 9:30-10 PM (EDT) Thursdays on the NBC television network. Episodes were pre-empted on June 30, July 7, July 28, and August 25, 1966.

Mickie Finn's was not renewed for the 1966-1967 Fall television season; on September 8, 1966, a sitcom series, The Hero, debuted in Mickie Finn's timeslot on NBC. This too lasted 16 weeks, replaced in January by the return of Jack Webb's Dragnet 1967.

== Chronology ==
- January 25, 1966: Filming started at NBC Studios in Burbank, California.
- April 21, 1966: First broadcast, singer Buddy Greco guest stars.
- April 28, 1966: Singer Joanie Sommers.
- May 5, 1966: Singer Frankie Randall and jazz bagpiper John Haywood.
- May 12, 1966: Singer Barbara McNair.
- May 19, 1966: Singer Roberta Sherwood and her son Don Lanning.
- May 26, 1966: Singer Keely Smith.
- June 2, 1966: Song-and-dance man John Bubbles.
- June 9, 1966: Singer Vic Damone, banjoist Don Van Palta.
- June 16, 1966: ?
- June 23, 1966: Eddie Foy Jr. and Reta Shaw; first appearance of the Dapper Dans.
- July 14, 1966: Frank Fontaine.
- July 21, 1966: Singer Bobby Darin.
- August 4, 1966: British singer Shani Wallis.
- August 11, 1966: Vic Damone.
- August 18, 1966: Singer Vikki Carr, and jazz clarinet player Charlie Romero.
- September 1, 1966: Shani Wallis and folk rocker Johnny Rivers (last show of the series, postponed from June 30).
