= Mickie Finn's =

Coordinates: 32°44′53.1″N 117°9′14.6″W

Mickie Finn's nightclub in 1968

Mickie Finn's (also known as Mickey Finn's) was a nightclub in San Diego, California, established in 1960 by piano player Fred E. Finn (Fred Soetje) and his wife Barbara, who used the stage name "Mickie Finn". Finn later extended the brand to a second club in Beverly Hills, a television show on NBC in 1966, a series of compilation record albums issued from 1966 on, and a stage show continuing into the 21st century.

== Nightclub ==
Fred and Barbara Soetje opened Mickie Finn's on October 28, 1960. They converted an old warehouse on University Avenue in the Hillcrest neighborhood of San Diego, into a "Gay '90s / Roaring '20s / Swinging '30s" nightclub. Finn was a piano player from San Francisco and had recently received a business administration degree from San Jose State College. He considered Washington and Hawaii for his planned nightclub, but chose San Diego because of logistics—he could not afford to transport his collection of old nickelodeons, 1890s pictures, and various turn-of-the-century items, with which he planned to decorate the new club, to the more distant locations.

Mickie Finn's had seating for 600 people, but often had larger crowds. It grossed over $250,000 in its first year. Over the next 14 years, four million customers consumed 250,000 gallons of beer. Banjo player Red Watson, Finn's musical partner in San Francisco, played at the club until 1965, when he moved on to play in Las Vegas. Finn's wife then played banjo at the club until the couple divorced in 1973.

Finn promoted the club with various publicity stunts. He raced a 1927 Seagraves fire engine at the El Cajon Speedway, and he fired an old cannon after every score by the San Diego Chargers football team at all home games. In the early 1970s, the Finns opened a second Mickie Finn's nightclub in Beverly Hills on Restaurant Row, in the new Los Angeles Emporium. The San Diego location closed in 1974. Finn's second wife, Cathy, took over the banjo duties from 1980 on.

== Summer TV show ==
In 1965, Finn was approached by television producer Bill Yagemann about doing a television series featuring the band and named after the club. Mickie Finn's was a summer replacement series for the failed NBC sitcom Mona McCluskey, which had starred Juliette Prowse and Denny Miller on Thursday nights. The show's Nielsen ratings were better than its sitcom predecessor's, but were not competitive with ABC's hit Peyton Place in the time slot, and NBC did not renew the show for the 1966–67 fall season.

== Record albums and singles ==
Dunhill Records, run by Lou Adler, signed Fred E. and Mickie Finn in 1966 during the run of their television show. Through the late '70s, Dunhill issued their singles (sometimes in simultaneous batches of four or five), and several albums (Mickie Finn's Live, Mickie Finn's: America's #1 Speakeasy, The Now Sound of Mickie Finn's, and Saturday Night at Mickie Finn's). Neither the albums nor the singles ever "climbed the charts", but are sought today as collector's items.

== Stage show ==
After the television show ended, the Mickie Finn stage show began headlining at Caesars Palace in Las Vegas in October, 1966, and continued to play other Las Vegas clubs until 1988. Fred Finn, with second wife Cathy on banjo, brought the show back to San Diego twice: first in 1988, for four performances at the Fiesta Dinner Theatre; and again in June 1990 for one month at the Hahn Cosmopolitan Theatre, produced in association with Scott Pedersen. From 1990 on, Finn continued his stageshow presence throughout the US from a base in Florida, changing the show's name from Mickie Finn's' to Mickey Finn's.
