= Preview Tonight =

American television anthology series

- Genre: Anthology series
- Country of origin: United States
- Original language: English
- No. of seasons: 1
- No. of episodes: 5

Production
- Running time: 60 minutes

Original release
- Network: ABC
- Release: August 14 – September 11, 1966

Preview Tonight is an American anthology television series that aired on ABC in the summer of 1966. The 60-minute episodes consisted of unsold television pilots.

== Background ==
The practice of television executives of ordering dozens of pilots for proposed television series each year – far more than their networks could possibly broadcast as series – created a sizable body of unsold pilots that had never aired. Packaging these unsold pilots in anthology series and airing them during the summer provided television networks with a way of both providing fresh programming during the summer rerun season and recouping at least some of the expense of producing them. Along with Summer Fun, Preview Tonight was one of two such series to air on ABC during the summer of 1966. Stars appearing in the series included Van Williams, Hal Holbrook, Jessica Walter, Robert Reed, and Bert Convy.

== Broadcast history ==
Preview Tonight ran for five episodes over the course of five consecutive weeks in the summer of 1966, airing on ABC from 8:00 to 9:00 p.m. Eastern Time on Sunday evenings. It premiered on August 14, and its last episode aired on September 11.

== Episodes ==
No. in season	Title	Directed by	Written by	Original release date
1	"Pursue and Destroy"	Don Taylor	Ivan Goff & Ben Roberts	August 14, 1966
Against overwhelming odds, the commanding officer of a United States Navy submarine takes his vessel and her crew on a gallant run during World War II. Starring Van Williams, Paul Comi, Dame Edith Evans, Dee Pollock, Jessica Walter, Henry Wilcoxon, Ward Wood, Thad Williams, and David Thorpe.
2	"Somewhere in Italy...Company B!"	Danny Arnold	Ben Roberts, Ivan Goff, & Danny Arnold	August 21, 1966
A comedic episode about American soldiers trapped behind enemy lines in Italy during World War II whose lieutenant recruits the assistance of local Italians in fighting the Germans. Starring Robert Reed, Harold J. Stone, Barbara Shelley, John Van Dreelan, Renzo Cesana, Richard Evans, Tim O'Kelly, Jack Colvin, Frank Puglia, and Vassili Lambrinos.
3	"The Cliff Dwellers"	Boris Sagal	Ben Roberts, Ivan Goff, & David W. Rintels	August 28, 1966
Murder occurs when a group of college friends reunite ten years after graduation to mourn a friend's suicide. Starring Bert Convy, Hal Holbrook, Beverlee McKinsey, James Beck, Robert Hooks, Terence Logan, Carol Rossen, Lee Allen, and Irene Yah-Ling Sun.
4	"Roaring Camp"	Lamont Johnson	Ben Roberts & Ivan Goff	September 4, 1966
A United States marshal must team up with a gunman. Starring Richard Bradford, Jim McMullan, Katherine Justice, Ian Hendry, Bibi Osterwald, Mike Wagner, Donald Contreras, and Gary Troy.
5	"Great Bible Adventures: Seven Rich Years and Seven Lean"	Boris Sagal	Ben Roberts & Ivan Goff	September 11, 1966
Joseph, the favorite son of his father Jacob, is sold into slavery by his jealous brothers, who tell Jacob that Joseph was killed by a lion. As a slave in the house of Pharaoh, Joseph becomes famous for his ability to predict the future and eventually rises to become Pharaoh's chief minister. Foreseeing a severe drought after seven years of plentiful harvests, he advises Pharaoh to order the construction of great granaries to store wheat during the plentiful years to ensure that the people of Egypt will have food during the years of drought. Suffering from famine during the drought, Joseph's brothers bring their families to Egypt in the hope of purchasing food there. Upon arriving, they discover that Joseph has risen to a powerful position and has the power to sell them grain — or order them killed. Starring Hugh O'Brian, Joseph Wiseman, Eduardo Ciannelli, Torin Thatcher, Katherine Ross, John Abbott, Paul Mantee, Sorrell Booke, and Anthony Caruso. The unsold pilot for a proposed television series based on stories from the Christian Bible to be called Great Bible Adventures.
