= Summer Fun (TV series) =

American television anthology series

- Newspaper advertisement for the premiere on July 22, 1966
- Genre: Anthology series
- Country of origin: United States
- Original language: English
- No. of seasons: 1
- No. of episodes: 7

Production
- Running time: 30 minutes

Original release
- Network: ABC
- Release: July 22 – September 2, 1966

Summer Fun is an American anthology television series that aired on ABC in the summer of 1966. The 30-minute episodes consisted of unsold television pilots.

== Background ==
The practice of television executives of ordering dozens of pilots for proposed television series each year – far more than their networks could possibly broadcast as series – created a sizable body of unsold pilots that had never aired. Packaging these unsold pilots in anthology series and airing them during the summer provided television networks with a way of both providing fresh programming during the summer rerun season and recouping at least some of the expense of producing them. Along with Preview Tonight, Summer Fun was one of two such series ABC aired in the summer of 1966, and it consisted entirely of unsold pilots for situation comedies, some prepared for the 1965–66 and 1966–67 seasons and most shot in color. Stars appearing in the series included Joan Blondell, Tom Ewell, Shelley Fabares, Celeste Holm, Bert Lahr, Basil Rathbone, and Jon Voight.

== Broadcast history ==
Summer Fun ran for seven episodes over the course of seven consecutive weeks in the summer of 1966, airing on ABC from 8:00 to 8:30 p.m. Eastern Time on Friday evenings. It premiered on July 22, and its last episode aired on September 2.

== Episodes ==
No.	Title	Directed by	Written by	Original release date
1	"McNab's Lab"	John Rich	William Burns & Norman Paul	July 22, 1966
A small-town pharmacist who moonlights as an inventor would rather tinker with zany contraptions in his laboratory than dispense pills. Starring Cliff Arquette, Sherry Alberoni, Eleanor Audley, David Bailey, Dee Carroll, Elisha Cook, Jr., Jan Crawford, Jonathan Hole, Peter Lazer, Gary Owens, Art Passarella, and Paul Smith.
2	"Little Leatherneck"	Unknown	Unknown	July 29, 1966
Nine-year-old Cindy Fenton, the tomboy daughter of a widowed United States Marine Corps drill sergeant, quickly is becoming a little U.S. Marine herself. Starring Scott Brady, Donna Butterworth, Ned Glass, Jean Innes, and Sue Ane Langdon.
3	"Thompson's Ghost"	Unknown	Richard Donovan & Lorenzo Semple, Jr.	August 5, 1966
Ten-year-old Anabel Thompson is fond of black magic, and while practicing her sorcery she manages to conjure up a blundering 4,700-year-old ghost named Henry. Starring Bert Lahr, Phyllis Coates, Pamela Dapo, Trudy Howard, Barry Kelly, Tim Matheson, Robert Rockwell, and Willard Waterman.
4	"The Kwimpers of New Jersey"	Alex March	N. Richard Nash	August 12, 1966
Alternatively titled "Pioneer, Go Home!" Based on the 1959 satirical novel Pioneer, Go Home! by Richard P. Powell, which tells the story of the Kwimpers, a family from New Jersey that moves to Columbiana, a fictional U.S. state that resembles Florida, and squats on the side of a highway where a new bridge is being built, outraging local officials. Starring Tom Ewell, Elliott Reid, and Jon Voight.
5	"Baby Crazy"	Richard Crenna	Jack Marlowe and Bill O'Hallaren	August 19, 1966
Joan Terry, a wise-cracking middle-aged nurse, applies for the nurse-receptionist position at the practice of handsome young pediatrician Dr. Pete Cooper, who leads a hectic life and has his hands full with his patients at the Northberry Medical Center. Starring James Stacy, Joan Blondell, Lynn Loring, and Gavin McLeod. Originally titled "And Baby Makes Three". Music by John Williams.
6	"Pirates of Flounders Bay"	Peter Bonerz	Maurice Richlin	August 26, 1966
The kind-hearted but trouble-prone Barnaby Kidd, 19th-century grandson of the 17th-century pirate Captain Kidd, tries to achieve fame of his own. Starring Peter Bonerz, William Cort, Charles Dierkop, Bridget Hanley, Burt Mustin, Harold Peary, Basil Rathbone, Jack Soo, Keenan Wynn, Jim Begg, and Jim Connell.
7	"Meet Me in St. Louis"	Alan D. Courtney	Sally Benson	September 2, 1966
A good-humored and naïve young debutante, the busiest daughter of her busy mother, draws the attention of the young men of St. Louis, Missouri, when her sing-and-scratch family moves there from New York City in 1903. Starring Shelley Fabares, Celeste Holm, Larry Merrill, Judy Land, Reta Shaw, Tammy Locke, and Morgan Brittany. Based on the 1944 movie Meet Me in St. Louis.
