= Ernest Jarrold =

Ernest Justin Jarrold (1848 – March 18, 1912) was the American author of a series of popular fictional stories about a boy named Mickey Finn. The "Mickey Finn" stories were published in newspapers across the United States, bringing nationwide fame to Jarrold.

Jarrold was born in August 1848 in Brentwood, Essex, England. When Jarrold was three years old, his family moved to New York and settled in the town of Kingston.

Jarrold married Ella Adelaid Clark on October 22, 1869, in Peekskill, New York. In 1881, he moved his family to Brooklyn and obtained a job at the New York Evening Sun. He eventually became a staff writer, and began writing short stories about a boy named "Mickey Finn" growing up in the Irish section of bucolic Rondout, New York, where he had lived previously with his wife and children.

At times, Jarrold published under the pseudonym Mickey Finn. He had several books published during his career, including collections of his Mickey Finn short stories.
