= 1969 in television =

The year 1969 in television involved some significant events. Below is a list of television-related events in 1969.

== Events ==
- January 4 – NBC expands the Huntley-Brinkley Report to Saturdays, with Chet Huntley and David Brinkley alternating weeks anchoring the news solo. Later, mediocre ratings prompt NBC to replace the duo with other newsmen, with the broadcast rechristened NBC Saturday News.
- January 13 – Dick York collapses on the set of Bewitched and is rushed to the hospital. He resigns from the show for health reasons and is replaced by Dick Sargent.
- February 5 – ABC runs the one and only airing of the notorious flop Turn-On.
- February 9 – CBS presents the Royal Shakespeare Company's version of A Midsummer Night's Dream, starring Diana Rigg, David Warner, and Helen Mirren.
- February 19 – At exactly 4:31 p.m. at the CBS Studio Center, with Jim Nabors saying the line "How interesting – and did she?", Gomer Pyle, U.S.M.C. shoots its final scene and completes its run.
- March 29 – Lulu performs "Boom Bang-a-Bang" at the Eurovision Song Contest 1969 in Madrid, and ends up in a four-way tie for first place, with 18 votes.
- April 4 – CBS bans the Smothers Brothers. Three days later, Walter Cronkite opens the evening newscast by confirming that the Smothers Brothers have been replaced by Hee Haw – effective immediately. But because it takes two months to assemble a typical Hee-Haw segment, CBS has to fill the time period with specials until Hee Haw premieres on June 15.
- April 11 – Rome, as only he could see it, is presented in Fellini, a Director's Notebook, an NBC special.
- April 13 – Dick Van Dyke and Mary Tyler Moore are reunited for a special, Dick Van Dyke and the Other Woman, on CBS.
- May 1 – Fred Rogers delivered a speech before the Senate Subcommittee on Communications which resulted in Congressional funding for PBS increasing from $9 million to $22 million.
- June 3 – The science fiction television series Star Trek airs its final new episode after being canceled by NBC. Its subsequent sale into rerun syndication soon after leads to a rise in popularity that transforms Star Trek into one of the century's most successful entertainment franchises.
- June 21 – On the BBC
  - Patrick Troughton makes his last regular appearance as the Second Doctor in the concluding moments of Episode 10 of the Doctor Who serial The War Games. It also marks the final time that the series is broadcast in black and white.
  - The BBC broadcasts the documentary The Royal Family, attracting more than 30.6 million viewers which is an all-time British record for a non-current event programme.
- July 3 – An elephant called Lulu runs amok on Blue Peter. The clip is subsequently repeated many times, becoming the archetypal British TV "blooper".
- July 20 – A live transmission from the Moon is viewed by 720 million people around the world, with the landing of Apollo 11; at 10:56 p.m. EDT Neil Armstrong (followed soon afterwards by Buzz Aldrin) steps onto the surface; viewers see a scan from broadcasts received at Honeysuckle Creek Tracking Station followed by Parkes Observatory in Australia.
- July 25 – Senator Edward Kennedy goes on TV to talk about the Chappaquiddick incident
- August 8 – MBC TV (owned by the Munhwa Broadcasting Corporation signs on, becoming the third network in South Korea.
- August 14 – Roman Polanski goes on TV to give his take on the Tate-LaBianca murders.
- August 18 – CBS pits Merv Griffin against Johnny Carson in the late-night talk-show arena – Carson wins.
- September 1 – TV Globo launches its first news and current-affairs program, Jornal Nacional, running Monday through Saturday.
- September 8 – From now on, all daytime programs on ABC and CBS are in color.
- September 26 – The Brady Bunch premieres on ABC.
- October 5 – The first episode of Monty Python's Flying Circus is broadcast by the BBC.
- October 15 – Radio Philippines Network ventures into television broadcasting with the successful launch of the network's flagship station KBS TV Channel 9. Properties and funding for the new TV network partly come from ABS-CBN in the form of its old headquarters along Roxas Boulevard and equipment from Toshiba enabling them to broadcast in color. As a result, on its launch it is named Accucolor 9 ("Accucolor" is the name of the color technology used) as the first Philippine television network to launch in full color.
- October 18 – The Jackson 5 make their national television debut on The Hollywood Palace.
- October 24 – After much experimentation, Televisión Nacional de Chile begins broadcasting over a network of 16 TV stations scattered all over Chile.
- November 3 – The first Network News bulletin in New Zealand goes to air after the NZBC TV network is commissioned, linking the country's four regional television stations (AKTV2, WNTV1, CHTV3, and DNTV2).
- November 10 – Sesame Street makes its debut on NET (later PBS) (1969–present).
- November 12 – The animated special Hey, Hey, Hey, It's Fat Albert, based on Bill Cosby's stand-up comedy, airs on NBC (it would be the inspiration for the later Saturday-morning cartoon, Fat Albert and the Cosby Kids).
- November 13 – Vice-president Spiro Agnew, in a televised speech from Des Moines, Iowa, stirs up a national controversy by attacking the network news commentaries.
- November 15 – Colour is introduced to BBC1 and ITV in the UK.
- November 16 – The Rolling Stones make their final appearance on The Ed Sullivan Show.
- December 2 – In tonight's episode of I Dream of Jeannie, Jeannie (Barbara Eden) finally becomes Mrs. Anthony Nelson
- December 7 - Frosty the Snowman premieres on CBS, before becoming an iconic Christmas television special and based on the song of the same name
- December 12 – The Archies' Sugar Sugar Jingle Jangle Christmas Show airs on CBS. It is not a success.
- December 17 – Tiny Tim gets married on Johnny Carson's The Tonight Show.

== Programs/programmes ==
- 60 Minutes (1968–present)
- Adam-12 (1968-1975)
- American Bandstand (1952–89)
- Another World (1964–99)
- As the World Turns (1956–2010)
- Bewitched (1964–1972)
- Blue Peter (UK) (1958–present)
- Bonanza (1959–73)
- Bozo the Clown (1949–present)
- Candid Camera (1948–present)
- Captain Kangaroo (1955–84)
- Come Dancing (UK) (1949–95)
- Coronation Street (UK) (1960–present)
- Crossroads (UK) (1964–88, 2001–03)
- Dad's Army (UK) (1968–77)
- Daniel Boone (1964–70)
- Dark Shadows (1966–71)
- Dragnet (franchise) (1951-1959, 1967–1970)
- Days of Our Lives (1965–present)
- Dixon of Dock Green (UK) (1955–76)
- Doctor Who (UK) (1963–89, 1996, 2005–present)
- Face the Nation (1954–present)
- Family Affair (1966–71)
- Four Corners (Australia) (1961–present)
- General Hospital (1963–present)
- Get Smart (1965–70)
- Gomer Pyle, U.S.M.C. (1964–69)
- Grandstand (UK) (1958–2007)
- Green Acres (1965–71)
- Gunsmoke (1955–75)
- Hallmark Hall of Fame (1951–present)
- Hawaii Five-O (1968–80)
- Here Come the Brides (1968–70)
- Here's Lucy (1968–74)
- Hockey Night in Canada (1952–present)
- Hogan's Heroes (1965–71)
- I Dream of Jeannie (1965–70)
- Ironside (1967–75)
- It's Academic (1961–present)
- Jeopardy! (1964–75, 1984–present)
- Julia (1968–71)
- Kimba the White Lion (1966–67)
- Laugh-In (1968–73)
- Love is a Many Splendored Thing (1967–73)
- Love of Life (1951–80)
- Magpie (UK) (1968–80)
- Mannix (1967–75)
- Mayberry R.F.D. (a continuation of The Andy Griffith Show, 1960-68), (1968–71)
- Meet the Press (1947–present)
- The Mind of Mr. J.G. Reeder (UK) (1969-1971)
- Mission: Impossible (1966–73)
- Mutual of Omaha's Wild Kingdom (1963–88, 2002–present)
- My Three Sons (1960–72)
- One Life to Live (1968–2012)
- Opportunity Knocks (UK) (1956–78)
- Panorama (UK) (1953–present)
- Petticoat Junction (1963–70)
- Play School (1966–present)
- Scooby-Doo, Where Are You! (1969–70)
- Search for Tomorrow (1951–86)
- Sesame Street (1969–present)
- Spider-Man (1967–70)
- That Girl (1966–71)
- The Beverly Hillbillies (1962–71)
- The Carol Burnett Show (1967–78)
- The Dean Martin Show (1965–74)
- The Doctors (1963–82)
- The Doris Day Show (1968–73)
- The Ed Sullivan Show (1948–71)
- The Edge of Night (1956–84)
- The Flying Nun (1967–70)
- The Good Old Days (UK) (1953–83)
- The Guiding Light (1952–2009)
- The Honeymooners (1952–70)
- The Johnny Cash Show (1969–71)
- The Late Late Show (Ireland) (1962–present)
- The Lawrence Welk Show (1955–82)
- The Mike Douglas Show (1961–81)
- The Mod Squad (1968–73)
- The Money Programme (UK) (1966–present)
- The Mothers-in-Law (1967–69)
- The Newlywed Game (1966–74)
- The Secret Storm (1954–74)
- The Sky at Night (UK) (1957–present)
- The Today Show (1952–present)
- The Tonight Show (1954–present)
- The Wednesday Play (UK) (1964–70)
- This Is Your Life (UK) (1955–2003)
- Tom and Jerry (1965–72, 1975–77, 1980–82)
- Top of the Pops (UK) (1964–2006)
- Truth or Consequences (1950–88)
- Walt Disney's Wonderful World of Color (1961 – July 1971 under this title; has aired regularly since 1954)
- What the Papers Say (UK) (1956–present)
- World of Sport (UK) (1965–85)
- Z-Cars (UK) (1962–78)

=== Debuts ===
- January 3 – Der Kommissar (1969–76) on ZDF in Germany
- February 7 – This Is Tom Jones (1969–71) on ABC
- March 9 - Department S (1969–70) on ITV
- April 10 - Peanuts (1969–81) on CBS
- April 23 – The Mind of Mr. J.G. Reeder (1969-1971) on ITV
- June 7 – The Johnny Cash Show (1969–71) on ABC
- June 15 – Hee Haw (1969–92) on CBS
- June 18 – The Main Chance (1969–75) on ITV
- September 6 – H.R. Pufnstuf (1969–71) on NBC
- September 8 – Where the Heart Is (1969–73) on CBS daytime
- September 11 – Time for Living (1969) on CBC Television
- September 13 –
  - Scooby-Doo, Where Are You! (1969–72), Dastardly and Muttley in Their Flying Machines (1969-70), and The Perils of Penelope Pitstop (1969–70) on CBS Saturday Morning
  - The Archie Comedy Hour (1969–70) on CBS Saturday Morning
- September 17 –
  - Room 222 (high school drama series) on ABC (1969–74)
  - The Courtship of Eddie's Father on ABC (1969–72)
- September 20 – Warner Bros. releases the final Looney Tunes animated short of the classic (1929–69) era
- September 21 – Randall and Hopkirk (Deceased) ITV in the UK
- September 23 – Marcus Welby, M.D. (1969–76) on ABC
- September 24 – Medical Center (1969–76) on CBS
- September 26 – The Brady Bunch (1969–74) on ABC
- September 29
  - Bright Promise (1969–72), the latter of the soap operas created by Frank and Doris Hursley, on NBC daytime
  - Love, American Style (1969–74) on ABC
- October 5
  - Monty Python's Flying Circus (1969–74) on BBC1
  - Sazae-san (1969–present) as a kids' comedy on Fuji Television in Japan
- October 7 – Mary, Mungo and Midge (1969) on BBC1
- November 8 – NBC airs the pilot episode of Rod Serling's science fiction anthology series Night Gallery, which would be picked up as a regular series for the 1970–71 television season
- November 10 – Sesame Street on National Educational Television (the predecessor to the Public Broadcasting Service) (1969–present)
- November 16 – The first episode of Clangers (1969–72) (a British stop motion animated television program for children) is broadcast by the BBC
- November 19 – The Benny Hill Show (1969–89) on Thames Television (UK)
- November 23 – Paul Temple (1969–71) on the BBC

=== Ending this year ===
Date	Show	Debut
January 4	Wacky Races (returned in 2017)	1968
February 9	The Saint (UK)	1962
April 13	The Mothers-in-Law	1967
May 2	Gomer Pyle, U.S.M.C.	1964
May 14	Do Not Adjust Your Set (UK)	1967
May 21	The Avengers (UK)	1961
June 2	Peyton Place	1964
June 3	Star Trek	1966
June 8	The Smothers Brothers Comedy Hour	1967
June 8	Peanuts (Returned in 1973)	1969
September 26	Match Game (Returned in 1973)	1962
December 13	The Banana Splits Adventure Hour (Returned in 2008 as The Banana Splits Reboot)	1968

=== Changes of network affiliation ===
Show	Moved from	Moved to
Get Smart	NBC	CBS
The Ghost & Mrs. Muir	NBC	ABC

== Births ==
Date	Name	Notability
January 1	Mr. Lawrence	American voice actor (SpongeBob SquarePants, Rocko's Modern Life)
January 1	Morris Chestnut	American actor (Rosewood)
January 1	Christi Paul	American news anchor
January 5	Marilyn Manson	American actor
January 6	Norman Reedus	American actor
January 7	Rex Lee	American actor (Entourage, Young & Hungry)
January 7	David Yost	American actor
January 8	Ami Dolenz	American actress (Ferris Bueller)
January 11	Kyle Richards	American actress (The Real Housewives of Beverly Hills)
January 13	Stephen Hendry	Player
January 14	Jason Bateman	American actor (The Hogan Family, Arrested Development)
January 14	Susan Glasser	American journalist
January 14	Dave Grohl	American singer
January 15	Kellita Smith	American actress (The Bernie Mac Show)
January 17	Naveen Andrews	American-British actor (Lost)
January 18	Dave Bautista	Actor and professional wrestler
January 18	Jesse L. Martin	American actor (Law & Order, The Flash)
January 19	Wendy Moniz	American actress (Guiding Light, Nash Bridges, The Guardian)
January 19	Junior Seau	American football player (NFL, Sports Jobs with Junior Seau) (died 2012)
January 21	Karina Lombard	American-French actress
January 21	John Ducey	American actor
January 22	Olivia d'Abo	English-American actress (The Wonder Years)
January 27	Patton Oswalt	American comedian and actor (The King of Queens, Agents of S.H.I.E.L.D.)
January 28	Kathryn Morris	American actress (Cold Case)
January 28	Mo Rocca	American actor
February 1	Brian Krause	American actor (Charmed)
February 5	Bobby Brown	Singer
February 6	April Lerman	American actress (Charles in Charge)
February 8	Mary McCormack	American actress (The West Wing, In Plain Sight)
February 8	Shiva Rose	American actress
February 8	Karl Wiedergott	American-German actor (The Simpsons)
February 9	Tom Scharpling	American writer
February 9	Ian Eagle	American sportscaster
February 10	Shorty Rossi	American star
February 10	Jazzmun	American actress
February 11	Jennifer Aniston	American actress (Rachel on Friends)
February 11	Anthony Sullivan	Pitchman
February 13	JB Blanc	Actor
February 14	Matt Olmstead	Writer
February 20	Tim Lagasse	Director
February 22	Clinton Kelly	Panamanian-American television host
February 22	Thomas Jane	American actor
February 23	Daymond John	American television personality
February 28	Robert Sean Leonard	American actor (House)
March 5	Paul Blackthorne	English actor (Arrow)
March 5	Lauren Weedman	American actress and comedian
March 6	Andrea Elson	American actress (ALF)
March 6	Amy Pietz	American actress (Caroline in the City)
March 10	Paget Brewster	American actress (Criminal Minds)
March 11	Terrence Howard	American actor (Sparks, Empire)
March 14	Channing Dungey	American television executive
March 14	Larry Johnson	NBA basketball player
March 15	Kim Raver	American actress (Third Watch, 24, Grey's Anatomy)
March 16	Judah Friedlander	American actor (30 Rock)
March 17	Matthew St. Patrick	American actor (Six Feet Under)
March 19	Connor Trinneer	American actor (Star Trek: Enterprise, Stargate Atlantis)
March 19	Kevin Shinick	American actor
March 20	Eric Drysdale	American writer
March 20	Kala Alexander	American actor
March 20	Richard Rawlings	American entrepreneur
March 23	Kelly Perine	American actor (One on One)
March 23	Daniel Radosh	American blogger
March 27	Kevin Corrigan	American actor (Grounded for Life)
March 27	Pauley Perrette	American actress (NCIS)
March 28	Laurie Brett	Scottish actress
March 28	Brett Ratner	Director
March 29	Tess Daly	English television presenter
April 1	April Stewart	American voice actress
April 2	Gyula Pados	Director
April 6	Ari Meyers	American actress (Kate & Allie)
April 6	Paul Rudd	American actor
April 10	Billy Jayne	American actor (Parker Lewis Can't Lose)
April 14	Sade Baderinwa	News Anchor For WABC-TV In New York
April 14	Martyn LeNoble	Member
April 19	Jesse James	TV personality
April 23	Jennifer Ashton	American television correspondent
April 23	Byron Thames	American television actor
April 24	Melinda Clarke	American actress (Days of Our Lives, The O.C., Nikita)
April 24	Mark Hentemann	American screenwriter
April 25	Renée Zellweger	American actress
April 25	Joe Buck	American sportcaster
April 28	Blake Neely	American composer
April 29	Paul Adelstein	American actor (Prison Break, Private Practice)
May 4	Art Edwards	American writer
May 10	Judson Mills	American actor (Walker, Texas Ranger)
May 10	Lenny Venito	American actor
May 12	Kim Fields	American actress (The Facts of Life, Living Single)
May 16	David Boreanaz	American actor (Buffy the Vampire Slayer, Angel, Bones)
May 16	Tracey Gold	American actress (Growing Pains)
May 16	Tucker Carlson	American host
May 16	Yannick Bisson	Actor
May 17	Frances Callier	American actress
May 18	Holly Aird	Actress
May 18	Martika	Actress
May 21	Rick Reichmuth	American meteorologist
May 22	Michael Kelly	American actor
May 24	Carl Anthony Payne II	American actor (The Cosby Show, Martin)
May 25	Anne Heche	American actress (died 2022)
May 27	Glenn Ficarra	Actor
May 27	Dondré Whitfield	Actor
May 28	Justin Kirk	American actor (Weeds)
May 29	Anthony Azizi	American actor (Lost)
June 1	Teri Polo	American actress (The Fosters)
June 4	Horatio Sanz	Chilean-born American actor and comedian (Saturday Night Live, Fillmore!)
June 4	Rob Huebel	American actor
June 5	Danny Lux	American composer
June 5	Brian McKnight	American singer
June 7	Kim Rhodes	American actress (As the World Turns, Another World, The Suite Life of Zack & Cody, The Suite Life on Deck)
June 8	J. P. Manoux	American actor (ER, Phil of the Future, The Emperor's New School, Aaron Stone)
June 8	David Sutcliffe	Canadian actor (Gilmore Girls)
June 8	Marcos Siega	American producer
June 9	Josh Hamilton	American actor
June 10	Kate Snow	American journalist
June 11	Peter Dinklage	American actor
June 11	Mary Calvi	American journalist
June 13	Laura Kightlinger	American actress and comedian (Will & Grace, The Minor Accomplishments of Jackie Woodman)
June 13	Jamie Walters	American actor and singer (Beverly Hills, 90210)
June 13	Scott Page-Pagter	American actor (died 2021)
June 14	Tim Long	American writer
June 15	Ice Cube	Rapper and actor (Boyz n the Hood, Friday)
June 15	Idalis DeLeón	Actress
June 16	Sam Register	American television producer
June 19	Lara Spencer	American television presenter
June 17	Amy Keating Rogers	American writer
June 17	Shawn Klush	American singer
June 23	Martin Klebba	American actor
June 23	Corey Holcomb	American actor
June 24	Rich Eisen	American television sportscaster
June 25	Hunter Foster	American actor
June 27	Ravi Kapoor	English actor (Crossing Jordan)
June 28	Tichina Arnold	American actress (Martin, Everybody Hates Chris)
June 28	Danielle Brisebois	American actress (All in the Family, Archie Bunker's Place) and singer
June 29	Federica Valenti	Italian voice actress
June 29	Tōru Hashimoto	Japanese TV personality
June 30	Ben Patrick Johnson	Voice actor
July 1	Rino Romano	Canadian actor
July 1	Keith Allan	Actor
July 3	Shawnee Smith	American actress
July 5	Jenji Kohan	American television writer
July 5	RZA	American actor
July 6	Brian Van Holt	American actor (Cougar Town)
July 7	Cree Summer	American-Canadian voice actress (A Different World, Tiny Toon Adventures, Sabrina: The Animated Series, As Told by Ginger, Codename: Kids Next Door, My Life as a Teenage Robot, The Buzz on Maggie, My Gym Partner's a Monkey)
July 7	Robin Weigert	American actress
July 8	Sugizo	Composer
July 10	Alexandra Hedison	American actress
July 12	Lisa Nicole Carson	American actress (ER, Ally McBeal)
July 12	Tom Kapinos	American writer
July 12	Lauren Lake	American judge
July 13	Ken Jeong	American actor (Community, Dr. Ken)
July 14	Laurieann Gibson	American actress
July 15	Reggie Hayes	American actor (Girlfriends)
July 15	Ian K. Smith	TV host
July 17	Jason Clarke	Australian actor
July 20	Josh Holloway	American actor (Lost, Intelligence)
July 21	Godfrey	American actor and comedian (The Mr. Men Show)
July 22	James Arnold Taylor	American voice actor (Drawn Together, Johnny Test, Star Wars: The Clone Wars)
July 22	Diana-Maria Riva	American actress
July 24	Jennifer Lopez	American actress and singer (In Living Color, American Idol)
July 24	Rick Fox	NBA basketball player
July 25	D.B. Woodside	American actor (24)
July 27	Triple H	American WWE wrestler
July 27	Bryan Fuller	American writer
July 28	Alexis Arquette	American actress (died 2016)
July 28	Dana White	President of the UFC
July 29	Timothy Omundson	American actor (Xena: Warrior Princess, Judging Amy, Psych)
July 29	Måns Mårlind	Screenwriter
July 30	Simon Baker	Australian actor and director (The Guardian, The Mentalist)
July 31	Ben Chaplin	Actor
August 2	Angélica Rivera	Actress
August 4	Michael DeLuise	American actor (21 Jump Street, seaQuest DSV)
August 5	Chuck Campbell	Actor
August 7	Scott Stossel	Journalist
August 8	Chris Beetem	Actor
August 15	Kimberley Kates	Actress
August 15	Craig Wedren	American singer-songwriter
August 16	Jase Robertson	American television personality
August 16	Andy Milder	Actor (Fame L.A., Legion of Super Heroes, Batman: The Brave and the Bold)
August 17	Donnie Wahlberg	American singer (New Kids on the Block) and actor (Blue Bloods)
August 17	Daniela Castro	Actress
August 18	Christian Slater	American actor (Breaking In)
August 18	Edward Norton	American actor
August 19	Matthew Perry	American actor (Chandler on Friends) (died 2023)
August 20	Billy Gardell	American actor and comedian (Mike & Molly)
August 23	Kari Lake	News anchor and politician
August 25	Rachel Shelley	Actress
August 25	Cameron Mathison	Actor
August 25	Neil Mandt	Director
August 27	Chandra Wilson	American actress (Grey's Anatomy)
August 28	Jack Black	American actor, comedian and singer
August 28	Jason Priestley	Canadian-American actor (Beverly Hills, 90210, Call Me Fitz)
August 30	Dylan Kidd	Writer
August 31	Jonathan LaPaglia	Australian actor (New York Undercover, Seven Days, The District)
August 31	Jeff Russo	Composer
September 3	John Fugelsang	American actor
September 5	Nicole Napolitano	American television personality
September 6	Trina McGee	American actress (Boy Meets World)
September 7	Diane Farr	American actress (Rescue Me, Numb3rs)
September 10	Johnathon Schaech	American actor
September 13	Tyler Perry	American actor
September 17	Matthew Settle	American actor (Band of Brothers, Gossip Girl)
September 26	David Slade	Actor
September 27	Sofia Milos	Swiss-born Italian-Greek actress (CSI: Miami)
September 27	Juliet Huddy	Host
September 29	Erika Eleniak	American actress and model (Baywatch)
September 30	Silas Weir Mitchell	American actor (Prison Break, Grimm)
September 30	Amy Landecker	American actress
October 1	Zach Galifianakis	American actor
October 3	Janel Moloney	American actress (The West Wing)
October 3	Gwen Stefani	American singer
October 4	Abraham Benrubi	American actor (Parker Lewis Can't Lose, ER)
October 4	Jerry Minor	American actor and comedian (Saturday Night Live, Carpoolers, Brickleberry)
October 8	Jeremy Davies	American actor (Lost)
October 8	Dylan Neal	Canadian actor (The Bold and the Beautiful, Dawson's Creek)
October 10	Wendi McLendon-Covey	American actress (Reno 911!, Rules of Engagement, The Goldbergs)
October 10	Manu Bennett	New Zealand-born actor (Spartacus, Arrow)
October 10	Loren Bouchard	Composer
October 16	Terri J. Vaughn	American actress (The Steve Harvey Show)
October 16	Nancy Sullivan	American actress (The Amanda Show, Drake & Josh, Squirrel Boy)
October 16	Jude	American singer
October 16	Suzanne Virdee	British regional newscaster (Midlands Today)
October 17	Wood Harris	American actor
October 19	Trey Parker	American actor and director (South Park)
October 19	Roger Cross	Jamaican-born Canadian actor (24)
October 21	Jonathan Glatzer	Writer
October 23	Brooke Theiss	American actress (Just the Ten of Us)
October 23	Sanjay Gupta	American neurosurgeon
October 25	Samantha Bee	Canadian-American comedian
October 26	Robert Maillet	Canadian television actor
October 29	Ali Velshi	Canadian television journalist
November 3	Rhashan Stone	American actor
November 4	Matthew McConaughey	American actor (True Detective)
November 4	P. Diddy	American rapper and actor
November 5	Pat Kilbane	American actor and comedian (Mad TV)
November 8	Rachel Bay Jones	American actress and singer
November 10	Ellen Pompeo	American actress (Meredith Grey on Grey's Anatomy)
November 12	Rob Schrab	American screenwriter
November 13	Gerard Butler	Scottish actor (300, The Phantom of the Opera)
November 13	Melissa Hayden	American actress (Guiding Light)
November 13	Stephen Full	American actor
November 15	David Miner	American television producer
November 18	Dan Bakkedahl	American actor
November 18	Phil Buckman	American actor
November 19	Erika Alexander	American actress (The Cosby Show, Living Single)
November 19	Hank Steinberg	American television and film writer
November 20	Callie Thorne	American actress
November 21	Ken Griffey Jr.	MLB baseball player
November 26	Shawn Kemp	NBA basketball player
November 27	Elizabeth Marvel	American actress
November 27	Sean Kenniff	American actor
November 28	Colman Domingo	American actor
December 3	Chris McKenna	American writer
December 4	J. Stewart Burns	American producer
December 4	Jay-Z	American rapper
December 5	Morgan J. Freeman	American director
December 5	Alex Kapp Horner	American actress
December 9	Allison Smith	American actress
December 9	Lori Greiner	American television personality
December 11	Max Martini	Actor
December 12	Maggie Rodriguez	Anchor
December 14	Natascha McElhone	English actress
December 14	Archie Kao	Actor
December 15	Ralph Ineson	English actor
December 16	Florencia Lozano	American actress
December 17	Laurie Holden	American actress
December 19	Richard Hammond	English presenter (Top Gear)
December 19	Kristy Swanson	American actress (Knots Landing, Early Edition)
December 19	Lauren Sánchez	American news anchor
December 21	Vladimir Duthiers	American television journalist
December 21	Mauro Ranallo	Canadian sports announcer
December 29	Jennifer Ehle	American actress (Pride and Prejudice)
December 29	Patrick Fischler	American actor (Lost, Mad Men, Southland)
December 30	Jay Kay	Singer

== Deaths ==
Date	Name	Age	Notability
January 3	Howard McNear	63	Actor (Floyd Lawson on The Andy Griffith Show)
May 27	Jeffrey Hunter	42	Actor (Temple Houston, Star Trek)
August 9	Sharon Tate	26	Actress
September 8	Bud Collyer	61	Game show host (Beat the Clock, To Tell the Truth)

== Television debuts ==
- Jane Alexander – N.Y.P.D.
- Carmen Argenziano – Judd, for the Defense
- Albert Brooks – Marcus Welby, M.D.
- Michael Douglas – CBS Playhouse
- Farrah Fawcett – Mayberry R.F.D.
- Morgan Freeman – New York Television Theatre
- Nick Nolte – Death Valley Days
- Hanna Schygulla – Die Revolte
- Tom Selleck – Judd, for the Defense
- Burt Young – The Doctors

== See also ==
- 1969–70 United States network television schedule
