= The Ed Evanko Show =

Canadian music variety television series

- Genre: Music
- Presented by: Ed Evanko
- Country of origin: Canada
- Original language: English
- No. of seasons: 1

Production
- Production locations: Winnipeg, Manitoba
- Running time: 30 minutes

Original release
- Network: CBC Television
- Release: 24 June – 22 July 1967

The Ed Evanko Show is a Canadian music variety television series that aired on CBC Television in 1967.

== Premise ==
Ed Evanko, an actor and singer, was featured in this mid-season series. Bob McMullin headed the series house band and choir. Guests artists included Winnipeg-area artists such as Lenny Breau, Judi Singh, Miriam Breitman, Hector Bremner, Peggy Neville, Ray St. Germain, Bobbi Sherron, Lorraine West and Yvette.

== Scheduling ==
This half-hour series was broadcast on Saturdays at 7:00 p.m. (Eastern) from 24 June to 22 July 1967.
