= Miriam Breitman =

- Genre: Variety
- Presented by: Miriam Breitman
- Starring: Lenny Breau
- Country of origin: Canada
- Original language: English
- No. of seasons: 1

Production
- Producer: Dale Watson
- Production location: Winnipeg
- Running time: 30 minutes

Original release
- Network: CBC Television
- Release: 3 July – 25 September 1968

Miriam Breitman is a Canadian variety television program that aired on CBC Television in 1968.

== Premise ==
Host Miriam Breitman was joined by Lenny Breau, a vocal trio and Bob McMullin conducting the show's orchestra in this Winnipeg-produced series. Breitman's guests included Manitoba musicians such as Ray St. Germain.

== Scheduling ==
This half-hour series was broadcast on Wednesdays at 5:30 p.m. from 3 July to 25 September 1968.
