= Federica Valenti =

Italian voice actress

- Born: 29 June 1969 (age 57); Turin, Piedmont, Italy
- Occupation: Voice actress

Federica Valenti (born 29 June 1969) is an Italian voice actress who has been featured as the voice of main characters in a number of anime television shows that have aired in Italy.

== Roles ==
* Bolded names indicate a major role in the work.

=== Anime (film) ===
- Detective Conan: The Time Bombed Skyscraper (1997) - Ayumi Yoshida
- Detective Conan: Captured in Her Eyes (2000) - Ayumi Yoshida

=== Anime (OAV) ===
- 3×3 Eyes Seima Densetsu (1995) - **Pai**

=== Anime (TV show) ===
- Barbapapa (1978) - **Barbottina**
- Dr. Slump (second dub, 1980/86) - Kinoko Sarada and Tsururin Tsun
- The Adventures of Hutch the Honeybee (1987) - **Petunia**
- Attack No. 1 (1993) - **Mimi Ayuhara**
- Bit the Cupid (1995) - Giada
- Baby & Me (1996) - **Midori**
- Cardcaptor Sakura (1998) - Akane (ep 15); Naoko Yanagisawa; Spinel Sun (Small)
- Barbapapa Sekai wo Mawaru (1999) - **Barbottina**
- Beyblade (2002) - Mariam
- Detective Conan (2002) - **Ayumi Yoshida**
- Aria the Animation (2005) - Direttore Aria Pokteng
- Aria the Natural (2006) - Direttore Aria Pokteng
- Aria the Origination (2008) - Direttore Aria Pokteng
- Blue Dragon: Tenkai no Shichi Ryū (2010) - Noi
- Pokémon (2003) - Max
- Yu-Gi-Oh! Zexal (2011) - Hart Tenjo

=== Western animation ===
- My Little Pony: Friendship Is Magic - Rainbow Dash
- Cubix - DonDon
- Fireman Sam (2004 series) - Mandy Flood
- Invader Zim - GIR
- Rocket Power - Regina "Reggie" Rocket
- Franklin and Friends - Skunk
- Danny Phantom - Samantha "Sam" Manson
- Dexter's Laboratory - Dexter
- Dragon Tales - Max
- Donkey Kong Country - Dixie Kong
