= Rick Reichmuth =

American meteorologist

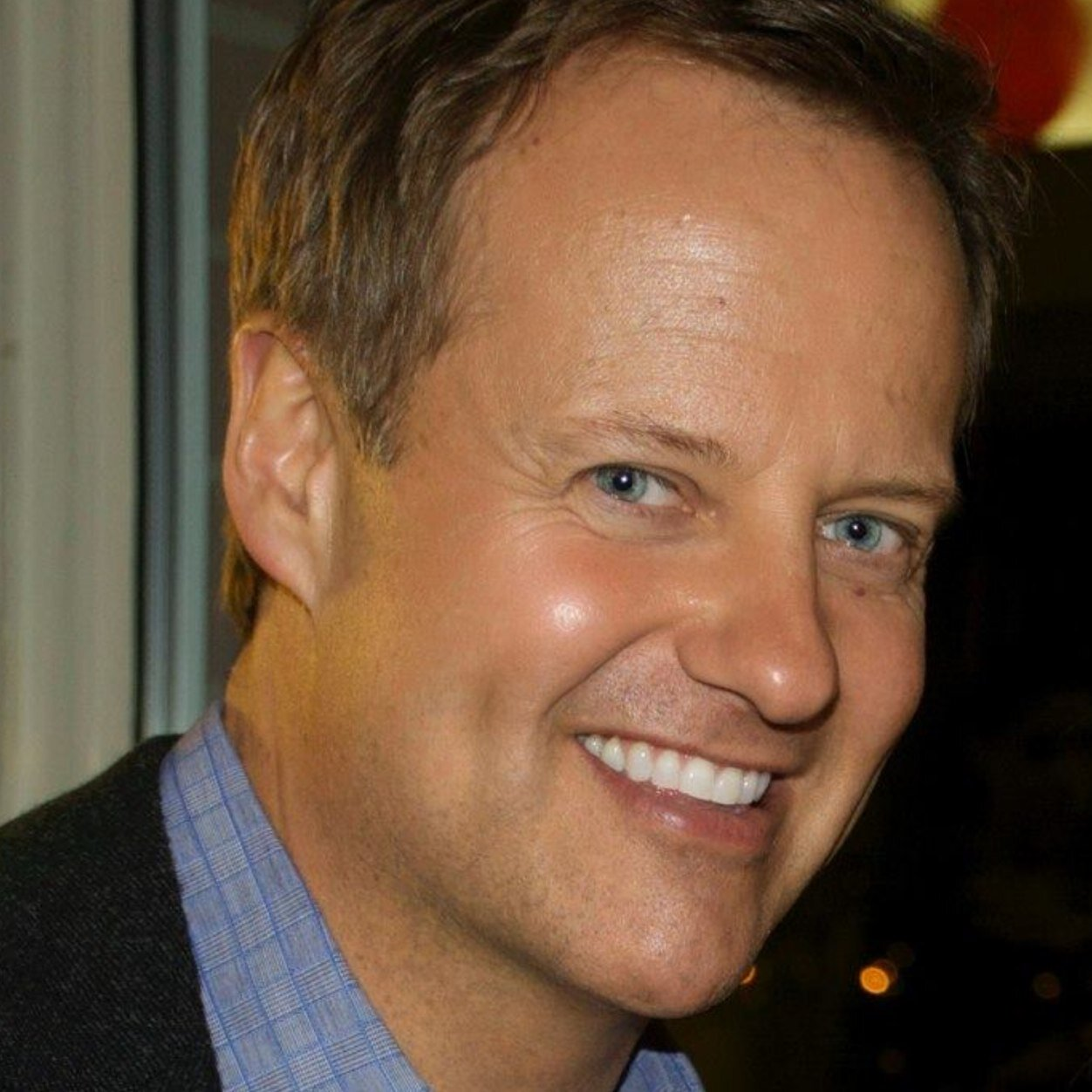
- Born: Richard Reichmuth; May 21, 1969 (age 57); Prescott, Arizona, US
- Education: Arizona State University, Georgia State University, Mississippi State University
- Occupations: Weather anchor, Television host
- Years active: 2000–present
- Title: Chief meteorologist, Fox News

Richard Reichmuth (born May 21, 1969) is an American meteorologist who is best known for his 19-year career on the Fox News program Fox & Friends.

== Early life and education ==
Rick Reichmuth was born and raised in Prescott, Arizona and graduated from Arizona State University with a degree in Spanish Literature. After nearly a decade in banking, he decided to make a change and pursue a lifelong dream in meteorology.

== Career ==
Reichmuth began his television career as a Production Assistant for CNN en Español in Atlanta, Georgia and began his on-air career at CNN Headline News, CNN and CNN International. From 2004–2006, Reichmuth conducted live weather forecasts as a meteorologist for Weather Services International in Andover, MA.

Reichmuth was the Chief Meteorologist at Fox News Channel for 19 years, until his departure on August 17, 2025. He also hosted and delivered forecasts on the digital broadcast television network and streaming channel Fox Weather.

Reichmuth is an American Meteorological Society Television Seal Holder (1679)

Reichmuth developed a line of umbrellas called "Weatherman," which launched November 16, 2017.
