= Time for Living =

- Genre: Variety
- Written by: Vern Kennedy; Alan Thicke
- Presented by: Ray St. Germain
- Country of origin: Canada
- Original language: English
- No. of seasons: 1

Production
- Executive producer: Len Starmer
- Producer: Ray McConnell
- Running time: 30 minutes

Original release
- Network: CBC Television
- Release: 11 September – 11 December 1969

Time for Living is a Canadian variety show that aired on CBC Television in 1969.

== Premise ==
This variety program included music and comedy that was intended for young adults. Host Ray St. Germain was joined by the comedy troupe The Society (originally called The Just Society). Show writer Alan Thicke was a member of The Society. Guests included musicians Lenny Breau and Beverly Glenn-Copeland, and comic Rosemary Radcliffe. Rick Wilkins was the show's musical director.

== Scheduling ==
This half-hour program was broadcast Thursdays at 8:30 p.m. (Eastern) from 11 September until its final episode on 11 December 1969.
