= List of Blue Dragon episodes =

This is a list of episodes for the Studio Pierrot anime series, Blue Dragon, based on the video game of the same name. The series' first season was broadcast on TV Tokyo for fifty-one episodes from April 2007 to March 2008. A second fifty-one-episode season, titled Blue Dragon: Trials of the Seven Shadows, was broadcast from April 2008 to March 2009.

The series was licensed in English by Viz Media. The series aired in the United States on Cartoon Network and on their Toonami Jetstream streaming platform in 2008.

In 2011, Viz placed Blue Dragon and Trial of the Seven Shadows on vizanime.com and Hulu. The version available is the original Japanese version with English subtitles.

== Episode list ==
=== Season 1 (2007-08) ===
| No. | Title | Original release date | English release date |
|---|---|---|---|
| 1 | "The Shadow Comes Forth"; Transliteration: "Kage, Hatsudō" (Japanese: 影、発動) | April 7, 2007 | March 28, 2008 |
A young boy named Shu is obsessed with becoming a Knight Master's apprentice after he hears that one has appeared in his village. Shu goes in search of him, only to find that the traveler is not a Knight Master at all, but a woman called Zola with the power to transform her shadow into a monster called Killer Bat. When the village is attacked by soldiers from the Grand Kingdom, Shu inadvertently unleashes his own Shadow, Blue Dragon.
| 2 | "A Fateful Decision"; Transliteration: "Aoki Chikara" (Japanese: 蒼き力) | April 14, 2007 | April 5, 2008 |
Shu finds himself unable to control Blue Dragon, and the Shadow destroys buildings and soldiers alike in its rage. Zola's traveling companion, Jiro, summons his own Shadow, Minotaur, to subdue Blue Dragon. Zola convinces Shu to join her and Jiro on their journey, telling him the soldiers were after the Blue Dragon and the village will not be safe while he stays there. Kluke, a friend of Shu, decides to go with them too.
| 3 | "Shu and Jiro: Rivals in Training"; Transliteration: "Shū to Jīro" (Japanese: シュウとジーロ) | April 21, 2007 | April 12, 2008 |
Shu begins his training with Jiro. Zola tells Jiro that he is opening his weak spots while he attempts to power up. They are attacked by Dolsk, a red-haired shadow user sent by Nene. Jiro defeats him and his shadow Ogre and the party arrives at a ruined city.
| 4 | "A Member of the Devee Tribe"; Transliteration: "Kirifuda wa Pantsu" (Japanese: 切り札はパンツ) | April 28, 2007 | April 19, 2008 |
Marumaro attacks Shu and the rest, thinking they are responsible for destroying the city. They set a trap and capture Marumaro. After being freed by Zola, Marumaro finds the citizens and Nene's minions. Shu and the rest join the fight and face a pair of twin shadow users named Ivanov and Gustav. The twins withdraw from the fight and Marumaro joins the team.
| 5 | "Front-Line Base Assault"; Transliteration: "Zeneraru Rogi" (Japanese: ゼネラル·ロギ) | May 5, 2007 | April 26, 2008 |
Zola and the team assault the fortress to free the captives from the city. Logi and his shadow Valkyrie defeat Zola and Killer Bat, then they defeat both Jiro and Marumaro. He leaves for an audience with Nene, leaving Ivanov and Gustav in charge. Shu manages to manifest and control the Blue Dragon, defeating the twins in the process. Shu and the rest then receive a mission to escort Legolas to a town.
| 6 | "No Good Deed Goes Unpunished"; Transliteration: "Fuwafuwa no Mugyu" (Japanese: ふわふわのむぎゅ) | May 12, 2007 | May 3, 2008 |
Shu and companions stop at a town for lunch. Shu saves a well-endowed waitress called Bouquet from two men's harassment. She tries to repay his kindness, but keeps messing things up. Bouquet turns out to be a shadow user. Her shadow Hippopotamus is weak in combat, but can shapeshift. After she loses her job, they run away from her, with Bouquet chasing them from behind.
| 7 | "The Trouble With Ghosts"; Transliteration: "Kifujin no Wana" (Japanese: 貴婦人のわな) | May 19, 2007 | May 10, 2008 |
General Logi receives a team of shadow users and Nene commands him to get rid of Zola. When the companions reach the kingdom of Jibral, they decide to solve a haunting mystery. The "ghost" turns out to be a shadow user named Salinas and his noblewoman-resembling shadow Jikonda, who attempts to destroy the military storage. Shu and Marumaro defeat him and he is taken by the guards. The party, along with Legolas, finally meet the king.
| 8 | "Castle Under Siege"; Transliteration: "Naito Masutā" (Japanese: ナイトマスター) | May 26, 2007 | May 17, 2008 |
Zola and company meets the king who grants her access to the ancient library. Shu finally meets a true Knight Master named Conrad L. Lawrence at the same time the guards are interrogating Salinas. Bouquet arrives at the city to find it under attack from Nene's Black Shadows: robotic shadow users led by Lt. Dragnov. Shu and company joins the fight. After the battle, it is discovered that pages from an ancient book are stolen in the chaos by an escaped Salinas as he gives them to a mysterious character, a woman who kills him.
| 9 | "The Sinister Sea"; Transliteration: "Puropōzu Daisakusen" (Japanese: プロボーズ大作戦) | June 2, 2007 | May 24, 2008 |
The last 7 pages of the Book of the Beginning are stolen and the guards find Salinas dead outside the city. Zola and company leave on a voyage, while Bouquet secretly boards the ship. Bouquet and Kluke argue whether Bouquet should stay or not (the argument mainly started when Bouquet started hugging Shu, Kluke got mad and was accused by Bouqet that Kluke liked Shu). They encounter a cute seal-like sea creature which produces a strange fog that causes the characters to act strangely. Bouquet helps to defeat the creature and officially joins the party. Shu, still recovering from the fog, inadvertently agrees to marry Bouquet. This results in Kluke getting mad and Shu to say "Oh no! The fog is back. I'm falling asleep", and then run off with Kluke in pursuit.
| 10 | "In Enemy Territory"; Transliteration: "Rogi, Shūrai" (Japanese: ロギ、襲来) | June 9, 2007 | May 31, 2008 |
As the team head for Nene's base, they encounter General Logi and decide to split up. Their plan fails as Zola and Killer Bat fight Lemaire and his shadow Deucalion, Jiro and Minotaur fights Cynthia and her shadow Yarovit, Maromaru and Saber Tiger fight Gilliam and his shadow Euphoria, and Shu encounters Andropov and his shadow Alubujem until Logi arrives.
| 11 | "Ambush"; Transliteration: "Hōi Ami o Toppase yo" (Japanese: 包囲網を突破せよ) | June 16, 2007 | June 7, 2008 |
As the others struggle to defeat their opponents, Shu and Blue Dragon face off against Logi and Valkyrie. Schneider and his shadow attack Bouquet taking off her clothes, but she uses her invisibility to escape. Shu learns a new technique that enables Blue Dragon to hurt Valkyrie. After defeating Lemaire, Zola catches up with Shu so he can retreat. Logi also orders his Independent Fighting Squadron to retreat as well.
| 12 | "An Honorable Opponent"; Transliteration: "Doragunofu Tokkō" (Japanese: ドラグノフ特攻) | June 23, 2007 | June 14, 2008 |
After being split up, the group starts to slowly reform, while Shu has a run-in with a mysterious man (who unbeknownst to Shu is Gran Kingdom's Lt. Dragnov) who leaves on a motorcycle after getting a call through a communication system. When Shu meets with the others, a war breaks out between the Black Shadow robots (now with their shadows upgraded into Type-2) led by Lt. Dragnov. The two release their Shadows and fight each other. As Lt. Dragnov's Berserker and Shu's Blue Dragon are locked in combat, Schneider brings out Isabel to snipe Lt. Dragnov.
| 13 | "Infiltrate"; Transliteration: "Sennyū" (Japanese: 潜入) | June 30, 2007 | June 21, 2008 |
As Jibral soldiers and their allies fight the Gran Kingdom army, Shu and Co. enter the capital of Gran Kingdom to rescue the children and fight Nene. Jiro has a flashback to when Gran Kingdom soldiers led by the robotic General Szabo destroyed Muffei and killed his family. They end up having a run-in with General Szabo in a laboratory where children were used for his powers. Jiro ends up falling into General Szabo's trap enough for it to power the robots in the room. Shu and Zola defeat the robots and Jiro manages to break free and uses his Minotaur shadow to destroy General Szabo.
| 14 | "Kluke's Wish"; Transliteration: "Kurukku no Omoi" (Japanese: クルックの想い) | July 7, 2007 | June 28, 2008 |
As Jibral and its allies fight Gran Kingdom's armies and the Independent Flying Squadron, Zola and the others find and confront Nene. He proves to be more than a match for each shadow user however and beats down everyone with his speed, anti-shadow technology, and his shadow Chimera. In a final stand, Kluke reveals her own power when she unveils the Phoenix shadow.
| 15 | "The Awakening"; Transliteration: "Kibō e no Shishin" (Japanese: 希望への指針) | July 14, 2007 | July 21, 2008 (TJ) |
With Kluke in a coma from the battle with Nene, Zola prevents some of Nene's soldiers from finding the hideout. Shu and Jiro encounter Legolas again with the updated info revolving around the theft of the pages from the Book of Origins and the description of the woman that was responsible for Salinas' death.
| 16 | "The Extra Seven"; Transliteration: "Hajimari no Sho" (Japanese: はじまりの書) | July 21, 2007 | July 28, 2008 (TJ) |
Unbeknownst to Shu and his friends, Nene and the rebuilt General Szabo begin an attack on Jibral. Shu tries to get info from Blue Dragon on why he needs more power. Shu tries to find the confidence to fight in time to face down the Grand Kingdom army and defend Kolin City.
| 17 | "The Informant"; Transliteration: "Homeron wa Shinda" (Japanese: ホメロンは死んだ) | July 28, 2007 | August 4, 2008 (Toonami Jetstream) |
Shu and his friends want to hire an informant to help them find the Extra Seven but are told that an informant named Homeron the great had died in battle against Gran Kingdom. At the same time, they meet the other Homerons ranging from Homeron the Original, Homeron II, Homeron the Legitimate, and Homeron Jr.. To pay for another informant, Shu heads off on his own to defeat the dangerous monster called the Gigarus and claim the reward. Shu and Blue Dragon managed to defeat the Gigarus and the group learns that the woman that hired Shu is actually Homeron the great, but Marumaro has gotten lost from the group.
| 18 | "The Innkeeper's Secret"; Transliteration: "Itoshi no Kage" (Japanese: 愛しの影) | August 4, 2007 | August 11, 2008 (Toonami Jetstream) |
Marumaro finds himself in hot water when he flirts with the innkeeper's wife, and he's in even deeper trouble when it turns out the innkeeper is a Shadow Wielder who deserted Gran Kingdom's army with the "wife" being his shadow. They soon learn that Marumaro isn't from Gran Kingdom. Marumaro and Saber Tiger later defend them from a Gran Kingdom captain and his troops with the innkeeper on his bounty list. Marumaro and Saber Tiger defeat them and they reunite with Shu and the others.
| 19 | "Cave of the Phoenix"; Transliteration: "Iseki no Nazo" (Japanese: 遺跡のなぞ) | August 11, 2007 | August 18, 2008 (Toonami Jetstream) |
Shu's informant Homeron is gathering information about the Extra Seven. Shu and Co. arrive at Flame Phoenix's ruins. When Kluke disappears, she ends up in the area where she first encountered her Phoenix shadow and asks it how she can call upon its power again. Phoenix tells Kluke that the answers lie in herself. Kluke then receives a necklace and rejoins Shu and Co. When they find Jibral's scattered army being attacked, Shu and Co. join the battle. Upon defeating the robotic soldiers and their shadows, Shu and Co. are soon attacked by a giant robot. Kluke brings out her Phoenix Shadow to use its barrier to protect everyone enough for Shu to use Blue Dragon to destroy the giant robot. Meanwhile, Homeron receives news the mysterious woman who stole the Extra 7 is heading west.
| 20 | "Decoy Mission!"; Transliteration: "Toraware no Naito" (Japanese: 囚われのナイト) | August 18, 2007 | August 25, 2008 (Toonami Jetstream) |
Shu and Co. encounter Homeron again. He reveals that the information of the Extra 7 is somewhere in Gran Kingdom's Castle Des La Teste and they will have to infiltrate it to get to its master computer. Conrad L. Lawrence is shown to be imprisoned in a local prison run by Cynthia which Homeron also tells Shu. Zola comes up with a plan to lure the guards from Castle Des La Teste in order to rescue Conrad and get the information. As the others attack the prison, Homeron, Kluke, and Bouquet infiltrate the castle. Upon rescuing the captive soldiers, Shu and Jiro free Conrad and run into Cynthia. Lemaire also arrives to help Cynthia and both of them begin to overwhelm Shu and Jiro until a successful attack from Blue Dragon and Minotaur weakens them down. Zola catches up after destroying the robots that came with Lemaire. With the reinforcements from Castle Des La Teste approaching, Zola issues a retreat as Homeron begins his infiltration.
| 21 | "The Informant's Quest"; Transliteration: "Tsuiseki·Jōhōshi" (Japanese: 追跡·情報師) | August 25, 2007 | September 2, 2008 (Toonami Jetstream) |
Conrad takes his soldiers to head to the west side to gather others that will fight Gran Kingdom. Homeron continues his infiltration to look for Castle Des La Teste's master computer. Gilliam and his followers Todd and Bishop attack the recently released prisoners resulting in Marumaro and Saber Tiger fighting Gilliam and Euphoria with Shu's Blue Dragon and Kluke's Phoenix joining the battle. Jiro and Zola fight Todd and Bishop. With the help of Phoenix, Marumaro and Saber Tiger managed to damage Euphoria. Andropov informs Gilliam to have his group retreat. As for Homeron, he learns the name of the white-haired woman to be Delphinium.
| 22 | "Fading Beauty"; Transliteration: "Kiekie no Iya~n" (Japanese: きえきえのいや〜ん) | September 1, 2007 | September 8, 2008 (Toonami Jetstream) |
Cynthia has grown jealous of Bouquet's beauty. This causes her to seek out and eliminate her. A fight on the narrow path causes everyone to fall into Death Valley. Bouquet brings out her Hippopotamus shadow to turn into a ball. Which ends up scattering everyone. As Shu and Co. evade the experimented creatures there, Cynthia learns from Andropov that the fog there has softened the cliff sides to the point where it is impossible to climb. As Andropov tries to find a way out for Cynthia, Bouquet and Hippopotamus secretly follow her to find a way out with Bouquet leaving a trail of her clothes for the others to follow. When her cover ends up blown near the exit of Death Valley, Cynthia attacks. Things weren't looking good for Bouquet and Hippopotamus. When Shu and Co. arrive, Cynthia retreats.
| 23 | "Mission: Information"; Transliteration: "Sōkyū e" (Japanese: 蒼穹へ) | September 8, 2007 | September 15, 2008 (Toonami Jetstream) |
Homeron informs Shu and Co. about Delphinium who is a Secret Intelligence Agent from Gran Kingdom responsible for the theft of the Extra 7. The group then sees the warships of Sabalu Country (which used to be part of Gran Kingdom) passing. Zola concludes that they give the Sabalu Country airships a warm welcome when the Warship Norg is amongst the Gran Kingdom ships. They managed to obtain one of its Mechats for that action. As the battle starts, they find the Norg and Shu uses Blue Dragon to get Homeron on board. When Kluke lands the ship on the Norg, a fight between the robotic soldiers ensues. Homeron manages to gain some information and prevent the Norg from crashing. He then tries to get info from the ship's captain on where it took Delphinium. When he does squeal that General Logi has the Extra 7, the Norg starts to descend to the ground.
| 24 | "The Monster in the Woods"; Transliteration: "Akuma no Tsuigeki" (Japanese: 悪魔の追撃) | September 15, 2007 | September 22, 2008 (Toonami Jetstream) |
Following the trail of the downed Norg ship, Shu and Co. look for Homeron and the Norg's crew in the Great Brandish Forest which is on the border of Gran Kingdom and Sabalu Country. Delphinium is also in the woods searching for the Norg Crew. Shu, Jiro, and Marumaro, as well as Homeron and the Norg Crew, are soon attacked by Obacks (one-eyed single-horned bears known as Horned Lazy Bears within the Blue Dragon game for the Xbox 360) even when Shu catches up with Honmalon at where the Obacks nest, Delphinium arrives and uses her shadow to kill Homeron. After evading Blue Dragon, Delphinium escapes. With the crew of the Norg freed, the captain of the Norg tells Shu that the Extra Seven are on General Logi's ship.
| 25 | "Independent Army"; Transliteration: "VS Dokuritsu Yūgekitai" (Japanese: VS独立遊撃隊) | September 22, 2007 | September 29, 2008 (Toonami Jetstream) |
Nene's flying fortress invades Raqueeva. When General Szabo questions Nene about General Logi's activity, Nene tells him to let General Logi handle Shu's group. On the trail of Logi's ship, Shu and Co. end up in battle with the Independent Flying Squadron again. This time, they've all been equipped with Power Boosters to make them more powerful and are instructed to fight them even if it is to the finish. Zola and Marumaro fight Gilliam, Todd, and Bishop while Cynthia and Schneider attack Shu and Co.
| 26 | "Cynthia's Madness"; Transliteration: "Kyōran no Shinshia" (Japanese: 恐乱のシンシア) | September 29, 2007 | October 6, 2008 (Toonami Jetstream) |
The battle against Logi's Independent Flying Squadron rages on as Shu, Kluke, Jiro, and Bouquet struggle to take down Cynthia while Zola and Marumaro do the same for Gilliam and his minions. When Marumaro takes down Bishop, he and Zola focus on the remaining two when Gilliam and Todd's Power Boosters overload. When this is discovered, General Logi orders Cynthia, Gilliam, and Todd to retreat, but Gilliam and Todd are shot down by Zola after Marumaro decoyed them. Despite Cynthia going into overdrive, she is defeated by Jiro anyway.
| 27 | "Next Stop: Logi's Battleship"; Transliteration: "Rogi no Fune e" (Japanese: ロギの船へ) | October 6, 2007 | October 13, 2008 (Toonami Jetstream) |
After Gilliam, Todd, Bishop, and Cynthia's defeat, General Logi sends Andropov, Lemaire, and Schneider to take on Shu and Co. Zola faces off against Lemaire while Jiro and Marumaro fight Andropov and Schneider. Lemaire has Deucalion use its bazooka attack to create a crater where Lemaire will have the advantage in. Shu faces off against General Logi. With Lemaire defeated by Zola, Kluke goes to help Shu while Bouquet infiltrates Logi's ship.
| 28 | "Face Off"; Transliteration: "Kosokoso no Dokyun" (Japanese: こそこそのどきゅん) | October 13, 2007 | October 20, 2008 (Toonami Jetstream) |
Shu and Kluke continue their fight with General Logi and Valkyrie. Marumaro is knocked unconscious by the attacks launched by Schneider's Isabel and Andropov's Alubujem. Luckily, Zola arrives to help Jiro. Meanwhile, Bouquet uses her invisibility to sneak onto Logi's ship and reclaim the Extra 7. Kluke falls unconscious after an attack that broke Valkyrie's shield (whose left wing ends up cut off in the process) the power surge of Blue Dragon's battle with Valkyrie results in a power surge that breaks the glass that's holding the pages. An invisible Bouquet seizes them but runs into Delphinium who managed to detect her. Logi and Valkyrie managed to bring down Blue Dragon, but Shu gets enraged enough to bring Blue Dragon up to a powerful level. Andropov and Schneider managed to get Logi out of there at the last minute. Debris from the battle makes a hole in the ship as Bouquet manages to make her escape through it only for Delphinium to use her shadow to snatch back the Extra 7 at the last minute. However, Bouquet managed to memorize them enough for her to use Hippopotamus' shape-shifting to turn into copies of them for Shu and Co. to try and decipher.
| 29 | "Breaking the Code"; Transliteration: "Ekusutora Sebun" (Japanese: エクストラセブン) | October 20, 2007 | October 27, 2008 (Toonami Jetstream) |
Shu and Co. work on deciphering the Extra Seven pages that Bouquet shapeshifts into. Meanwhile, at Szabo's request, Nene orders General Logi to take a break from his mission. With the Extra Seven deciphered, Shu and Co. steal one of the Mechats from a Gran Kingdom airship and head to the ruins at Talta Village.
| 30 | "The Dark Dragon"; Transliteration: "Yami no Doragon" (Japanese: 闇のドラゴン) | October 27, 2007 | November 3, 2008 (Toonami Jetstream) |
Arriving at the Blue Dragon's ruins, Shu and Blue Dragon have a confrontation with a shadow called Dark Dragon. After nearly falling for Dark Dragon's deceit, Shu and Blue Dragon engage it in battle matching attack with attack. Shu manages to overcome Dark Dragon.
| 31 | "Jiro Takes A Stand"; Transliteration: "Tsuyoki Mono" (Japanese: 強き者) | November 3, 2007 | November 10, 2008 (Toonami Jetstream) |
Upon learning about Blue Dragon gaining another attack, Nene sends General Szabo to the capital of Galga to attack Shu and Co. while General Logi is off duty. The next destination is the Minotaur Ruins, but Jiro said that his village was burned to the ground and he leaves for a walk. While looking out near a lake, he is attacked by General Szabo. This time, General Szabo unleashes his Mighty Quartet to assist him. Minotaur manages to pull off a retreat to get Jiro out of there. After a brief talk with Kluke, Jiro is attacked General Szabo and his Mighty Quartet. Shu and Kluke arrive at the scene of the attack as General Szabo merges with his Mighty Quartet to form Ultimate Szabo. As Shu unleashes Blue Dragon, General Szabo unleashes a giant robot to fight Blue Dragon. Zola, Marumaro, and Bouquet arrive just as Blue Dragon breaks the giant robot's left hand. Jiro and Minotaur knock Ultimate Szabo into the lake. After some attacks from Ultimate Szabo, Jiro and Minotaur create their own whirlpool and eventually destroys Ultimate Szabo (with the Minotaur statue in its ruins breaking) as Shu and Blue Dragon destroy the giant robot. Delphinium tells General Logi that Blue Dragon and Minotaur have gotten stronger and part of the Extra Seven has been deciphered by Shu and Co.
| 32 | "The Shadow Wielder's Apprentice"; Transliteration: "Kage Tsukai no Deshi" (Japanese: 影使いの弟子) | November 10, 2007 | November 17, 2008 (Toonami Jetstream) |
Shu and Blue Dragon are sent to the nearest town to find a blacksmith to make a replacement part for the Mechat and also to get supplies. On their way to the nearest village, Shu and Blue Dragon save a boy named Tonto from local bandits whose jewels were taken from Tonto. Upon arriving in the village, Shu meets Tonto's sister who happens to be a blacksmith. Shu has some trouble when Tonto steals tomatoes, potatoes, and apples from three local farmers and Shu had to pay for those. Shu and Tonto get into trouble with Tonto's sister when she finds out that Shu is a Shadow Wielder and Tonto had been stealing again. After dodging her hammer before she collapses in sorrow, Shu learns that Tonto's sister hates Shadow Wielders after recurring attacks by Shadow Wielders from Gran Kingdom. When asked why Tonto wants to become a Shadow Wielder, Tonto's sister states that Gran Kingdom returned last year with Ivanov and Gustav demanded tribute. Shu and Tonto's sister get word from one of the farmers that the local bandits have captured Tonto. Shu and Tonto's sister managed to find their hideout as the bandits use a tank and robots they stole from Gran Kingdom to attack Shu and Blue Dragon. Due to Tonto's sister not liking Shadow Wielders, Shu is easily taken down by the bandits and Blue Dragon causes them to retreat. After recuperating, Shu finally gets that replacement part for the Mechat and defeats the bandits before rejoining with the others.
| 33 | "Homecoming"; Transliteration: "Pantsu Tengoku" (Japanese: パンツ天国) | November 17, 2007 | November 24, 2008 (Toonami Jetstream) |
General Logi is informed on the development on the Extra Seven. Shu and Co. head to Marumaro's village. When Marumaro wants to fulfill the prophecy of the original Saber Tiger wielder, he has Saber Tiger remove the guardian statues from the top of the other Devees' houses causing the other Devees to get angry and chase them. Marumaro then goes on a beautiful girl-viewing activity causing one of them to issue a complaint to Marumaro's parents. Zola sends Shu, Jiro, Kluke, and Bouquet to stop Marumaro. After catching up, Zola tells them to lure Marumaro into the canyon. Marumaro and Saber Tiger managed to get through every trap and barrier to gain a new power. Meanwhile, General Logi heads off on his own and leaves Andropov and Schneider in charge of the ship.
| 34 | "Gilliam's Revenge"; Transliteration: "Giriamu Futatabi" (Japanese: ギリアム再び) | November 24, 2007 | December 1, 2008 (Toonami Jetstream) |
Gilliam is shown recuperating at Castle Des La Teste and recovers quickly in a plot to take revenge on Zola. Delphinium allows Gilliam to take the type-three models of the Black Shadow robots with him. Kluke and Bouquet argue where to go next when Zola tells them that they have to refuel the Mechat. Meanwhile, Nene is informed that the drilling beam on his flying fortress is almost up to power. The groups Mechat lands at a nearby Gran Kingdom strategic refueling base. While Shu and Jiro protect Kluke while she refuels the Mechat, Zola and Marumaro take on the soldiers positioned there. Zola encounters Homeron the Legitimate in the guise of a Gran Kingdom soldier. Gilliam receives word from Delphinium that the Gran Kingdom strategic refueling base was attacked and heads over to that area. Kluke is told by Zola to head to the Hippopotamus Ruins since Nene's flying fortress is heading there. Gilliam attacks and Zola engages him while the others fight his Black Shadows. Kluke solves Chapter Seven of the Extra Seven and uses the crystal on her necklace to power up Phoenix when the Black Shadows charge up their attack. Kluke uses this new ability to block the attack and send it back toward the Black Shadows. Zola uses Killer Bat's Hornet Assassin attack on Euphoria which annihilates Gilliam.
| 35 | "Bouquet's Ruins"; Transliteration: "Hikaru Kaba" (Japanese: 光るカバ) | December 1, 2007 | December 8, 2008 (Toonami Jetstream) |
From their Mechat, Shu and Co. notice Nene's fortress abducting the Hippopotamus Ruins and rush there before it is carried away. Nene suggests to his crew to drop the ruins onto the informant town of Coreed where a resistance is located. Nene tells General Szabo to finish his repairs while he heads down to the Hippopotamus Ruins. Zola unleashes Killer Bat to defend the Mechat from the flying fortress' lasers. When the Mechat starts to lose power, they abandon it by jumping to the ruins. When Shu and Co. make it to the ruins and enter it, they have a run-in with Nene. As Bouquet enters the area with the Hippopotamus statue in it, the others fight Nene who brings out Chimera. Bouquet and Hippopotamus try to solve the riddle of the 5th page. After Chimera takes some blows from Blue Dragon, Minotaur, and Saber Tiger, Zola and Killer Bat join the battle. Nene escapes as General Szabo arrives with some robotic soldiers who attack. In Coreed, Conrad speaks with Knight Masters from around the world about fighting back against Grand Kingdom. As Bouquet tries to find her way out, General Szabo retreats as Nene's fortress starts to drop the Hippopotamus Ruins. After Bouquet passes her test, Shu and the others work on preventing the ruins from falling onto Coreed and redirect it away from Coreed. Zola mentions that there is a seventh Soldier of Light and mentions that they will be meeting that person soon. Nene then orders General Szabo to summon General Logi.
| 36 | "Bouquet's New Power"; Transliteration: "Hisohiso no Dokkan" (Japanese: ひそひそのどっかん) | December 8, 2007 | December 15, 2008 (Toonami Jetstream) |
When Nene's fortress starts attacking Coreed, Conrad has Shu and Co. ride giant birds called Gryphs to Nene's fortress while Conrad and the others fight Black Shadow Type-Two robots. Zola also tells Shu and the others that Nene is one of the descendants of the Soldiers of Light. They successfully infiltrate the fortress. Once inside, they end up in the S-Field and fight Black Shadow Type-Three robots which have nanobot technology that enables them to regenerate. After recurring takedowns on the Black Shadows, Bouquet and Hippopotamus manage to find the control room General Szabo is in and gets in as Nene. Bouquet then reveals herself and then transforms into a Black Shadow Type-Three and manages to use Hippopotamus' new ability to copy the optic attack of the Black Shadow Type-Three which sends General Szabo flying into the air and exploding. After Bouquet shuts down the Black Shadows, Shu and the others locate Nene's throne room for the final battle.
| 37 | "Strength in Numbers"; Transliteration: "Kessen – Kūchū Yōsai" (Japanese: 決戦·空中要塞) | December 15, 2007 | December 22, 2008 (Toonami Jetstream) |
The group decides to take Nene down once-and-for all. Both sides unleash their shadows as Chimera counters their moves. After landing a hit on Chimera, Nene has it use Shadow Multiply for each shadow. Meanwhile, General Logi gets word that Zola and the others are engaging Nene and plans to wait for the outcome. Nene reveals that the captive children's strengths are flowing into him. After some history behind Zola and Nene are revealed, Nene has three of the Chimera clones charge up the Graviton Balls and has the other three keep the others at bay while Kluke and Bouquet get trapped before they can help Zola. Back on the ground, Legolas arrives with reinforcements to help Conrad against the Black Shadow units. Surviving Chimera's attack, Zola unleashes the true power of Killer Bat as it changes color and gets much faster. Shu and Jiro send Blue Dragon in to help her while Marumaro and Saber Tiger try to free Kluke and Bouquet. Zola manages to take down one of the Chimera clones, but is hit by Nene's attack.
| 38 | "Dark Symphony"; Transliteration: "Saigo no Tatakai" (Japanese: 最後の戦い) | December 22, 2007 | December 29, 2008 (Toonami Jetstream) |
Zola has been defeated while Marumaro and Saber Tiger free Kluke, Phoenix, Bouquet, and Hippopotamus. Shu and Jiro have Blue Dragon and Minotaur attack Nene. Nene combines the Chimera clones to form one large Chimera. Meanwhile, General Logi has dispatched his troops which will attack when Schneider and Andropov receive the command from General Logi. Nene uses Chimera's Dark Symphony attack which weakens his opponents. When Shu and Blue Dragon's attacks are countered by Chimera's attack, Shu falls unconscious. In a dream sequence, he encounters Lt. Dragnov and Homeron. Marumaro and Kluke are defeated as Jiro has Minotaur aim for the device on Chimera's forehead. Shu rises from his boulder grave for another bout with Nene. Assisting Jiro and Minotaur in attacking the crystal on Chimera's forehead, Shu and Blue Dragon learn that the crystal enabled Chimera to alter his elements. The limiter is unleashed as Nene and Deathroy merge with Chimera to form an amalgam of all three of them. With Jiro defeated, Shu uses every ounce of his power and manages to destroy Nene. With news of Nene's defeat and the Galleon going down, General Logi gives the command to move out. At Castle Des La Teste, Schneider take over it before an order can be given to move all available troops to Coreed. Andropov attacks some Gran Kingdom airships. This is General Logi's act of his secession from Gran Kingdom which he announces. As the Galleon continues to go down, Deathroy is on the ground as a shadow of someone approaches him.
| 39 | "Triumphant Return"; Transliteration: "Gaisen" (Japanese: 凱旋) | January 5, 2008 | January 5, 2009 (Toonami Jetstream) |
Following the destruction of Nene, the children that Nene has captured have been returned to their families. With the struggle against Nene's forces finally over, everyone rejoices. Shu and Co. alongside the survivors of Jibral and their allied forces celebrate their victory after arriving at the city of Logic. At the local banquet, Shu, Kluke, Jiro, Marumaro, and Bouquet receive their medals. Meanwhile, General Logi is informed by Delphinium that following Nene's destruction, the remaining forces of Gran Kingdom are either fleeing or even deserting. General Logi tells her that they are leaving Gran Kingdom. After a very long speech, Legolas and Conrad inform Shu and the others that they have assembled soldiers to go after the remainder of the Gran Kingdom army. After travelling to a temple and finding out that General Logi had been there, Zola has Homeron the Original and his fellow Homerons look for General Logi. Later that night, Shu and Jiro discuss about what will be next now that Nene is destroyed. Meanwhile, Delphinium attacks General Logi for his act of secession from Gran Kingdom. Delphinium escapes and General Logi doesn't bother to let Andropov track her down. With Zola still away, Shu, Jiro, Kluke, Marumaro, and Bouquet wonder what to do next now that they've defeated Nene. As Conrad and Legolas lead thousands of men to hunt down the remainder of Gran Kingdom's forces, Zola finally returns and tells them that they will be heading to the Sealed Grounds. Meanwhile, Andropov and Schneider have increased the powers of their shadows Alubujem and Isabel for General Logi's next plot.
| 40 | "Rosekstan"; Transliteration: "Rōzenkuroitsu" (Japanese: ローゼンクロイツ) | January 12, 2008 | January 12, 2009 (Toonami Jetstream) |
General Logi arrives in the ruined town of Alabaruz where General Orehill of Gran Kingdom's 3rd Squadron army is trying to set up a new world order. While traveling to the Sealed Grounds, Zola explains that the Sealed Grounds are a set of ruins relating to the Soldiers of Light as Andropov spies on them. Back at the ruined town, General Logi establishes it as the Rosekstan Kingdom which will be a Shadow Extremist nation. He also persuades General Orehill, the civilians, and the Gran Kingdom soldiers present to join his cause after showing them the Black Shadow Type Four (exo-suits that contain artificial shadows) Schneider informs General Logi about the information Andropov told him about Zola heading to the Sealed Grounds. General Logi and Schneider confronts the team on the path to the Sealed Grounds. General Logi faces off against Zola while Schneider and Andropov keep the others busy. General Logi recaps when Zola was with Gran Kingdom army before she betrayed them. The others unleash their shadows to fight back against Schneider and Andropov. Zola mentions to General Logi that she's after the truth of shadows. In order to learn about Zola's secret, General Logi instructs Andropov and Schneider to capture one of the Shadow Wielders. As Andropov charges toward Shu and Kluke, Blue Dragon uses his Blue Explosion attack to shatter Alubujem. However, Andropov has Alubujem use its remains to form a crystalline trap around Kluke. This enables Andropov, Schneider, and General Logi to get away. On the airship, General Logi states to Andropov and Schneider that he will get Kluke to tell her everything she knows about Zola and the shadows.
| 41 | "Bird in the Cage"; Transliteration: "Kago no naka no Kotori" (Japanese: 籠の中の小鳥) | January 19, 2008 | July 2009 (CN Australia) |
Shu and the others cope with Kluke's disappearance. General Logi in the meantime is interrogating Kluke in his castle.
| 42 | "The Arrival of Odin"; Transliteration: "Kakusei" (Japanese: 覚醒) | January 26, 2008 | July 2009 (CN Australia) |
As Shu and Jiro fight Schneider and Andropov, Zola faces against General Logi again almost being killed. After taking a hit from Blue Dragon's Blue Explosion Attack, Logi's shadow Valkyrie vanishes and an Egyptian-themed shadow called Odin appears turning out to be his real shadow. When Odin uses his Sugurd Level attack on Shu and Blue Dragon, Zola blocks the attack before anything can harm Shu. Meanwhile, Andropov helps Kluke escape.
| 43 | "The True World"; Transliteration: "Shichinin no Hikari no Senshi" (Japanese: 七人の光の戦士) | February 2, 2008 | July 2009 (CN Australia) |
Kluke has joined the battle against General Logi, Andropov, and Schneider. A bunch of ruins arises alongside the statues of Blue Dragon, Minotaur, Phoenix, Saber Tiger, Hippopotamus and Odin that are shown on the columns. While General Logi fights Zola, the other defend themselves against Andropov and Schneider. When General Logi has Odin fire his attack on Jiro and Minotaur, Zola and Killer Bat protect them and collapses. Shu has Blue Dragon use his Blue Explosion on General Logi and Odin. Delphinium arrives and has her shadow defeat Zola. Delphinium then arises a container containing Deathroy. Shu and Jiro defend Zola from Delphinium's shadow. Delphinium withdraws her shadow as Deathroy uses her to unleash Chimera. The final statue shows Chimera. As the columns activate some spell, the Shadows end up paralyzed as General Logi prevents Zola from breaking a glass container. With Andropov and Schneider held at bay and General Logi engaged with Zola, Shu uses her sword and breaks the door. This unleashes a dark mass over the area as Zola goes into it. Zola also states that she will start the beginning of the true world.
| 44 | "Darkness' True Form"; Transliteration: "Shinjitsu" (Japanese: 真実) | February 9, 2008 | July 2009 (CN Australia) |
Shu and the remaining try to find a way to beat it while also trying to figure the reason for Zola's betrayal. Shu convinces everyone that Zola must have some good reason for all of this. He decides that they should team up with Logi and go inside the darkness and talk to Zola.
| 45 | "A New Plan"; Transliteration: "Purupuru no poyon" (Japanese: ぷるぷるのぽよん) | February 16, 2008 | July 2009 (CN Australia) |
General Logi, Andropov, and Schneider make an attempt to study the darkness unleashed by Zola and find a way to combat it.
| 46 | "Dissension"; Transliteration: "Fukyōwaon" (Japanese: 不協和音) | February 23, 2008 | July 2009 (CN Australia) |
Shu and Jiro rescue Conrad from an army of shadow monsters. With some unlikely help from Delphinium and Deathroy, Shu persuades General Logi to help fight Zola.
| 47 | "Into the Darkness"; Transliteration: "Yami no naka e" (Japanese: 闇の中へ) | March 1, 2008 | July 2009 (CN Australia) |
As General Logi's airship enters the dark mass, there are soon attacked by flying shadow monsters. The airship's defenses and the Black Shadow Type-Two units fight against them as more flying shadow monsters. When it starts to become overwhelming, the Shadow Wielders prepare to fend them off. The shadow monsters start doing damage to ship causing it to crash to the ground. Using a Darkness Defense Medallion on them while the airship provides cover, General Logi leads the other Shadow Wielders off the airship to the ground below. General Logi's airship lures the other flying shadow monsters away only to run into another wave of them. With most of the crew killed, the airship's captain detonates the airship destroying the flying shadow monsters attacking it. Shu ends up saving Delphinium from a shadow monster attack as Andropov and Schneider unleash their shadows to do the same for them.
| 48 | "The Gate"; Transliteration: "Futatsu no chikai" (Japanese: 二つの誓い) | March 8, 2008 | July 2009 (CN Australia) |
Shu, Kluke, Jiro, Marumaro, Bouquet, General Logi, Andropov, Schneider, Delphinium and Deathroy fight their way past various shadow monsters to get to Zola. Upon arriving at a large gate, General Logi unleashes Odin to stop two giant, scythe-wielding shadow monsters from attacking Shu. The other shadows are unleashed to help fight them. Andropov and Schneider do a combo attack to immobilize the giant shadow monsters while General Logi has Odin open the large gate. While Schneider and Andropov hold off the giant shadows, the others get through the gate. When both of them have been weakened, Schneider sacrifices his life to stop the giant shadow monsters.
| 49 | "Zola"; Transliteration: "Zora" (Japanese: ゾラ) | March 15, 2008 | July 2009 (CN Australia) |
The group confronts Zola in a final stand that seems pointless as Zola easily proves her superiority against them. Shu and Co. are sucked into the darkness after Zola breaks their medallions. Shu learns about the past of Zola from Killer Bat and finds the way out of the darkness.
| 50 | "The Ties That Bind"; Transliteration: "Kizuna" (Japanese: 絆) | March 22, 2008 | July 2009 (CN Australia) |
The fight with Zola and Killer Bat rages on. Even when Blue Dragon successfully attacks Zola, she then transforms into a demonic version of herself.
| 51 | "Shu"; Transliteration: "Shū" (Japanese: シュウ) | March 29, 2008 | July 2009 (CN Australia) |
The final battle arrives between Shu and the more powerful demon Zola. After Shu defeats Zola everyone begins the resealing of the darkness. But they learn that in order to free the world of darkness, a sacrifice of the shadows must be made. So everybody uses up every last drop of energy that their shadows possess and they reseal the darkness. They all lose their shadows in the process.

=== Season 2 (2008-09) ===
| No. overall | No. in season | Title | Original release date | English release date |
|---|---|---|---|---|
| 52 | 1 | "Red Dragon"; Transliteration: "Akaki Ryuu" (Japanese: 紅き竜) | April 5, 2008 | June 7, 2010 (MGM Cartoons Channel Pakistan) |
Two years after the world is freed from darkness, a young dragon escapes from a castle. It crashes to earth leaving a crater. Shu and Bouquet have joined Legolas' Sarbin resistance against General Logi. Shu led a supply raid on a Rosekstan airship, then uses a blue version of the Black Shadow Type-Four to fly Bouquet to the crater. They encounter a mysterious boy named Noi. All three find themselves prey to a Rosekstan fleet. But a red dragon appears and decimates the Rosekstan forces. While evading the red dragon, Noi uses his Tosen Kyuden ability on Shu. With Noi's help, the Blue Dragon returns. After a fierce battle, Shu and Blue Dragon cause the red dragon to retreat.
| 53 | 2 | "Noï"; Transliteration: "Noi" (Japanese: ノイ) | April 12, 2008 | June 8, 2010 (MGM Cartoons Channel Pakistan) |
Shu has a dream of a mysterious girl telling him to save the world. Meanwhile, General Logi is in the middle of world conquest when his second-in-command Matilda tells him of an important matter. While traveling, Shu and Bouquet talk about Noi including the part where he awakened Bouquet's Hippopotamus. Shu then tells Bouquet that something is not right in the world and says that they will be heading to Marumaro's village. Rosekstan's capital Albarose is then invaded by a woman who has the same characteristic as Noi. Having his guards taken down, Logi faces the woman. The women however wants a fair fight so she reawakens Odin from his slumber with her Tousen Genbaku. Shu's party later has a run-in with a man named Mikhail stating to be a "Investiture Being" whose is able to release a shadow which is a splitting red of the red dragon they fought before. Overwhelmed as their fight rages on, Noi reluctantly uses his Tousen Bardagir move that gives Bouquet and Hippopotamus the ability to merge with Shu to form a new armored form for Blue Dragon with legs to overpower Mikhail but not defeat him.
| 54 | 3 | "A Manly Challenge"; Transliteration: "Otoko no Shoubu" (Japanese: 漢の勝負) | April 19, 2008 | June 9, 2010 (MGM Cartoons Channel Pakistan) |
Mikhail leaves thereafter, before warning Shu that the fate of the world lies in the choices he and his friends make. Back with Logi's duel with the mysterious woman, she states that he was not qualified and in a flash sets Logi and Albarose ablaze. Watching from a distance were two tightly cloaked characters. Feeling the need to gather the previous partners being shadow users, Shu takes Bouquet and Noi to Marumaro's village to awaken Marumaro's shadow Saber Tiger. But starting out on a wrong foot sets Noi and Marumaro at each other's throats. To settle their differences Shu has Marumaro and Noi compete in different sporting events like arm wrestling, racing, and other events. When it comes to a card game, Noi wins and uses his Tousen Kyuden to awaken Saber Tiger. The Investiture Beings are in their meeting and have elected Shu as the World's Representative. Mikhail leaves to watch over Shu's progress.
| 55 | 4 | "Scales of Ambition"; Transliteration: "Yokubou no Uroko" (Japanese: 欲望の鱗) | April 26, 2008 | June 10, 2010 (MGM Cartoons Channel Pakistan) |
During their search for Jiro, Shu runs across news of a small war about to happen between a Rosekstan sub fleet led by Captain Varenko and a small band of resistance led by Captain Crester (one of the surviving members of Grand Kingdom). The party continues forward anyway hoping not to get found, leading to the combination of Saber Tiger and Hippopotamus with the 'stealth mode'. During but a few moments, Crester's band of resistance were eliminated. It was then suddenly Micheal appears before Crester and grants him the power to call his own Wyvern-like shadow allowing him to devastate General Logi's sub fleet. Having found out that the shadow that Crester wields is different from the normal Shadows and the Artificial Shadows used by Grand Kingdom, Shu's party steps in to defeat Crester. After defeating Saber Tiger and Hippopotamus, Crester faces off against Shu and Blue Dragon. After Crester is defeated, Shu, Bouquet, and Marumaro learn about the 'Dragon scales' Mikhail handed out which can grant miraculous powers to the user. They then overhear one of the Rosekstan soldiers tell Captain Varenko that they lost contact with General Logi.
| 56 | 5 | "Wake of Pyramid"; Transliteration: "Kuchita Piramiddo" (Japanese: 朽ちたピラミッド) | May 3, 2008 | June 11, 2010 (MGM Cartoons Channel Pakistan) |
Shu's party crosses the desert to find a huge pyramid and right across was Heliut, a town with many casinos. In the town, they find Legolas, their leader of the resistance who came to Heliut to procure enough funds for his resistance by going to the casinos. He ended up to his life in debt to Mayor Heliut the IV after Legolas lost it. During the conversation, suddenly the pyramid began to rise and start moving towards the town launching its bricks toward Heliut. The armies of Mayor Heliut the IV fail to stop it. Attempting to settle his debt by saving Heliut, Legolas sends Shu's party to demolish the pyramid after speaking to Mayor Heliut the IV. Bouquet and Hippopotamus merge with Shu's Blue Dragon as Marumaro unleashes Saber Tiger. Every attack that the Bouquet/Blue Dragon does to the pyramid, it rebuilds itself. Mayor Heliut the IV tells Legolas that if anything happens to his city, he will hold Legolas responsible. Noi comes with a plan which involves Bouquet splitting from Blue Dragon and merging with Saber Tiger. When the Bouquet/Saber Tiger gets close, Shu has Blue Dragon attack followed by the Bouquet/Saber Tiger attacking the core. When they managed to stop the pyramid, they discover that one of Mikhail's Dragon Scales was placed in a mummy. After being congratulated by Mayor Heliut the IV, the group learns that Legolas' deal to him was that they would stop the pyramid in exchange for being free from his debt. While Shu angrily chases after Legolas, Bouquet, Marumaro, and Noi enjoy their stay in Heliut.
| 57 | 6 | "Crossing Paths"; Transliteration: "Sorezore no Michi" (Japanese: それぞれの道) | May 10, 2008 | June 14, 2010 (MGM Cartoons Channel Pakistan) |
Arriving to Coreed, Shu, Bouquet, Marumaro, and Noi ask Homeron the Original to help them in locating Jiro, but learn that he has retired and recommends one more skilled than he is. Upon learning the triangular pattern as part of Homeron the Original's riddle about someone inheriting Homeron's wishes, they end up at the house of Xie (the girl that Homeron the Great was disguised as in an earlier encounter). Before getting down to business, she informs the group that Rosekstan's capital Albarose was destroyed throwing the world in chaos. Xie also mentions that the Red Dragon that Shu had encountered happens to be sighted whenever coup d'état, wars, and natural disasters are going to occur. She does manage to give them directions on where Jiro and Kluke are residing. Meanwhile, Jiro has a run-in with Delphinium and Deathroy which ends with Delphinium escaping. When Shu, Bouquet, Marumaro, and Noi arrive at Jiro's hut, they run into Jiro. Jiro has trained himself to become a good warrior and is not interested in joining Shu in his quest or wanting his shadow Minotaur awakened. Shu goes against Jiro to see what he has learned when fighting Blue Dragon. After Jiro managed to knock down Shu and Blue Dragon, they learn that Jiro is training hard so that he can one day defeat Delphinium. Upon learning about Noi's abilities, Delphinium attacks and captures Bouquet. She uses her as a "trade card" to get Noi to reawaken Deathroy's shadow Chimera. Noi does so and Tosen Kyuden ability on Deathroy which reawakens Chimera. With Chimera awakened, Delphinium escapes knowing that she run into Jiro again. After the events, Jiro and Shu's party begins traveling in their different paths with Jiro stating that now isn't the time for Minotaur to be awakened and that he will be going after Delphinium.
| 58 | 7 | "First Love"; Transliteration: "Hatsukoi" (Japanese: 初恋) | May 17, 2008 | June 15, 2010 (MGM Cartoons Channel Pakistan) |
In a broken-down village, Shu's party encounters a girl named Linda who tells them that the Brigands consisting of Schmidt and his army of Mecha Robos (which were salvaged from the war) keep attacking her village to steal everything. Linda reveals that the villagers shun conflict to evade standing up to Schmidt. When the villagers return. It is here that Noi met his first love in Linda. Shu, Bouquet, Marumaro, and Noi help the villagers rebuild their village. After some romantic hintings by Marumaro to Noi, Schmidt and his army of Mecha Robos arrive and attack the village. While Noi and Linda evacuate the village, Shu, Bouquet, and Marumaro holds off the Mecha Robo army. After the villagers are safely in the mountains, Shu and Marumaro unleash their shadows and fight back. Meanwhile, Schmidt finds the hiding place of the villagers and finds their hidden treasure while the Mecha Robos with him restrain the villagers. When it comes to protecting Linda and the villagers, Noi reveals himself to be the young black dragon (from episode one) when trying to save Linda. Noi in his dragon form then attacks the Mecha Robos. Meanwhile, Shu and Marumaro finish off the Mecha Robos in the village. After taking out the Mecha Robos, Noi engages Schmidt in battle and defeats him. Upon seeing Linda's reactions, Noi flies off as Shu, Bouquet, and Marumaro catch up to the villagers. Moments later, the villagers rebuild their village as Shu, Bouquet, and Marumaro wonder how Schmidt was taken down as Noi returns. As they leave, Linda appears to say goodbye to Noi.
| 59 | 8 | "Her Decision"; Transliteration: "Kanojo no Sentaku" (Japanese: 彼女の選択) | May 24, 2008 | June 16, 2010 (MGM Cartoons Channel Pakistan) |
Kluke is shown leaving in a nearby village, being a teacher to some kids and treats the injuries of a boy named Romu after he trips. While at the beach, Bouquet and Marumaro have some fun while Shu goes to the village where Kluke is living. While on the path to the village, Shu runs into Noi who states his interest in finding Kluke and going to awaken her shadow. Meanwhile, Bouquet gets jealous when she hears from Marumaro that Shu went off to look for Kluke. The next day, Kluke leaves to tend to her students. At her house, Shu encounters Andropov who says that Kluke isn't here. Besides stating that he is looking for Kluke, Shu tells Andropov about what happened to Albarose and that General Logi's whereabouts are unknown. Meanwhile, Noi meets with Kluke. Andropov tells Shu that Kluke doesn't want to end up battling again. While the kids are napping, Kluke tells Noi on how she was treating the injured following a great battle and that one of the injured was Andropov. Also when brought up by Andropov to Shu, a flashback depicts Shu telling Kluke that Legolas is organizing a resistance against Rosekstan and states that she doesn't want any part in the resistance. After the flashback, a battle between Shu and Andropove then assume where Shu wins with little trouble due to Andropov's condition. Shu is unable to trample over Kluke and Andropov long found peace causing Shu to leave. Meanwhile, Noi secretly reawakens Kluke's Phoenix without her knowing and departs. Later that evening, Kluke returns home and meets up with Andropov.
| 60 | 9 | "Dance of Love"; Transliteration: "Ai no Dansu" (Japanese: 愛のダンス) | May 31, 2008 | June 17, 2010 (MGM Cartoons Channel Pakistan) |
Arriving in a local town, Shu recalls about his attempts to Jiro and Kluke to help him. This causes Marumaro to become concerned and Bouquet to feel neglected. Marumaro ends up encountering dancing sisters Donna and Reina. When Marumaro brings them to Shu to cheer him up, the sisters end up dancing with Shu and Noi until Bouquet arrives getting into an argument with Shu. The sisters break from Noi and end up sucking the life out of Shu and Bouquet. Donna and Reina then perform while sucking the life out of some of the townspeople. Marumaro ends up deciding to correct this problem and obtaining Noi's help. Donna and Reina recall when they used to be down and out until Mikhail arrived and gave them Dragon Scales to make them more beautiful. This also caused them to absorb the energy of jealous people. When Donna and Reina leave, Marumaro and Noi emerge from their hiding spots as Noi tells Marumaro that Donna and Reina have the crests of the Dragon Scale on their necks. Marumaro and Noi end up disguising themselves as one person so that Marumaro can use his shadow power to deactivate the Dragon Scales starting with Reina. It doesn't go well when their disguise eventually fails. Marumaro ends up enticed by their beauty until Noi ends up not showing off his jealousy. Donna and Reina end up attempting to entice Noi with their beauty making Marumaro jealous. When Donna and Reina end up trying to absorb Marumaro's jealousy energy, Noi ends up biting Reina. Using Saber Tiger, Marumaro ends up driving the Dragon Scales out of Donna and Reina. Once the Dragon Scales were destroyed, those that they have drained energy from were restored. As Shu starts to regain his energy, he finds out that the name of the girl that has been appearing in his dreams is Primella. He ends up waking up alongside Bouquet. With Donna and Reina still unconscious with Noi stating that they won't remember a thing, Shu, Bouquet, Marumaro, and Noi take their leave. Shu finds out that Marumaro had been worried about him and Bouquet. Shu and Bouquet then end up in another argument revolving around what happened between him and Donna and Reina.
| 61 | 10 | "Heart-Pounding Bliss"; Transliteration: "Dokidoki no Powan" (Japanese: どきどきのぽわん) | June 7, 2008 | June 18, 2010 (MGM Cartoons Channel Pakistan) |
The mysterious woman before now known to be named Lotarus is shown to be one of seven shadowy dragon from the castle in the sky. She is given freedom to re-judge the people of the world even after her ordeal with Logi. She runs into Mikhail and tells him that she will handle the next test. In Logic, Shu is at the library looking up while Bouquet takes Marumaro and Noi out shopping for groceries. After Marumaro and Noi ditch Bouquet, she runs into Lotarus (who uses the alias of Lota) who becomes curious about her. She asks what Bouquet wished for if she had power, but she replies that she already has everything she wants. Meanwhile, Shu finds nothing about where the dragon sightings are. Bouquet finishes her shopping with Lotarus and takes her around town. Shu is still trying to find the sightings of the Red Dragon on the map while recapping what Mikhail said. While Marumaro and Noi are enjoying an ice cream cone, Noi ends up noticing Lotarus near Bouquet. Noi runs off to tell Shu that Bouquet might be in danger. Shu even recaps about Xie telling him about a woman floating over the waters when Albarose was destroyed. While in the park, Lotarus forges a Dragon Scale Pendant behind her back and begins to offer it to Bouquet stating that it will give Bouquet what she wishes for. Before Bouquet can accept Lotarus' gift, Shu cuts in and identifies Lotarus as being in the same race as Mikhail. As Shu unleashes Blue Dragon, Lotarus ends up unleashing her shadow that resembles a white dragon with pink wings. Shu and Blue Dragon fight Lotarus as she states about the Dragon Scale tests causing Shu to recap the incidents with Crester and the moving pyramid. Lotarus states that the Dragon Scale tests were done by Mikhail and that Mikhail had been watching him. Right when Shu and Lotarus are about to make their next move, Bouquet interferes causing the match to be a draw. Before she departs, she tells Shu and Bouqet to tell Noi to make his decision as well. Later that evening, Shu gets Marumaro and tells them that they are going to find Mikhail who is spotted nearby the wetlands at the edge of Logic.
| 62 | 11 | "Mikhail"; Transliteration: "Mikyaeru" (Japanese: ミヒャエル) | June 14, 2008 | June 21, 2010 (MGM Cartoons Channel Pakistan)n) |
Shu heads out to the wetlands at the edge of Logic. Of course he rushes there to find him. Meanwhile, Jiro is attacked by the sea shore by some soldiers in white and fends them off when a man named Vermillion shows up telling them to fall back as Jiro is not a shadow wielder. Moments later, Delphinium and Deathroy approach the soldiers' camp to look for Dr. Tarkovsky. After 2 days of waiting all spot a cloud that's not moving with the wind like others do. They were pursuing it till it landed on mountains. That's the place where the clash with Mikhail begins. Meanwhile, Jiro follows the caravan of the soldiers in white until Delphinium appears. The fight looks like Mikhail got big advantage when he brings out his red dragon shadow against Shu, but he still attacked with stronger attacks. After a long fight, Shu used gattai (fusion) with Bouquet and crumbled Mikhail to dust. However it appeared, but was only clone made from Dragon Scale. The real Mikhail appears.
| 63 | 12 | "Noe's Decision"; Transliteration: "Noi no Ketsudan" (Japanese: ノイの決断) | June 21, 2008 | June 22, 2010 (MGM Cartoons Channel Pakistan) |
Noi reveals himself to be one of the 'Investiture Beings' also but still has the trust of Shu and the party. The battle with Shu and Mikhail rages on again with Mikhail unleashing his Red Dragon shadow even when Marumaro and Saber Tiger throw themselves in front of Mikhail's attack. Mikhail reveals his true form as the Red Dragon. Meanwhile, Lotarus notices the soldiers in white approaching. The warriors Vermillion and Furioso watch the fight recapping about Primella's prediction of Albarose' destruction when Dr. Tarkovsky appears identifying the Red Dragon as Mikhail as their tri-barrel technological weapons get positioned. Mikhail ends up breaking up the fusion of the Hippo/Bouquet/Blue Dragon. Shu refuses to give up when Mikhail starts attacking Noi for breaking the rules of the Investiture Beings. Then Noi transforms into his black dragon form and initiates the forbidden fusion with Blue Dragon to gain a new dragonite form easily putting them at odds with Mikhail. In this form, Blue Dragon manages to wound Mikhail. During the fight, the soldiers in white step in firing a tri-barrel weapon called the Brunack causing Mikhail to flee. The soldiers corner Shu and co. as Vermillion introduces them as the "White Guardians" and stated that their mission was absolute destructions of all shadows.
| 64 | 13 | "The White Guardians"; Transliteration: "Shiro no Ryodan" (Japanese: 城の旅団) | June 28, 2008 | June 23, 2010 (MGM Cartoons Channel Pakistan) |
Noi separates from Blue Dragon when White Guardians prepares to fire their Brunacks. Shu fends off the White Guardians while Noi gets Bouquet and Marumaro away from the area. Shu manages to have Blue Dragon use his Blue Explosion attack to cover his retreat. The White Guardians also retreats as Lotarus watches from afar. Mikhail is shown near a river badly wounded. Shu and Noi have a conversation regarding the events that occurred two years ago as the White Guardians continue their advancement. Later that evening, the village that Shu and Co. are resting turns out to be near the White Guardians' headquarters in the city of Nirvana. Bouquet uses her invisibility to figure out what the White Guardians is up to. Bouquet then unleashes Hippopotamus and takes the form of a White Guardian to throw them off track. Shu and Co. are spotted by some White Guardians, but are knocked out by Saber Tiger. Making their way through the city, Shu and Co. finally encounter Primella in person.
| 65 | 14 | "The Oracle"; Transliteration: "Michibiki no Shōjo" (Japanese: 導きの少女) | July 5, 2008 | June 24, 2010 (MGM Cartoons Channel Pakistan) |
After Shu's brief talk with Primella, Noi finds a path out of Nirvana. Shu and Co. make their way through the city while evading the White Guardians. During this part, Bouquet's hair touching Marumaro's nose causes him to sneeze giving them away to two of the soldiers. Shu and Marumaro manage to take them down as two more appear. Lucky for them, Jiro arrived and took them down. Jiro manages to create a diversion as Shu and the others make their escape. When Furioso gets ready to fire the weapons into the area where Shu and Co. are, Dr. Tarkovsky intervenes and tells him and the soldiers in the area to fall back.
| 66 | 15 | "Exhausted Collapse"; Transliteration: "Herohero no batan" (Japanese: へろへろのばたん) | July 12, 2008 | June 25, 2010 (MGM Cartoons Channel Pakistan) |
While traveling through the desert, Shu, Bouquet, Marumaro, and Noi come across a ghost town after a mirage incident. When Shu, Marumaro, and Noi find a girl they are attracted to, they get into a fight where Bouquet had to use Hippopotamus' shape-shifting ability to break it up. When Bouquet suddenly falls ill, Shu, Jiro, and Marumaro evade the ghost town's ghosts until they see a flying spider-like creature. They go after it on the back of Saber Tiger. When the giant spider causes a rockslide that brings to life rock monsters, Shu unleashes Blue Dragon who alongside Saber Tiger destroys the rock monsters. When Saber Tiger impales its abdomen with his attack, it unleashes a multicolored water that submerges them. While underwater, Shu notices a green plant and they head toward it while evading giant killer fish. They managed to make a hasty retreat to the surface. As Shu and Marumaro dive back in, Noi turns into his black dragon form and joins them. As Shu and Marumaro hold off the giant killer fish, Noi discovers that the green plant is alive. Blue Dragon manages to yank it out of the ground draining the water. They then end up back at where the scene of their mirage occurred in which it was all a dream.
| 67 | 16 | "Enter Nirvana"; Transliteration: "Totsunyuu Niruvaana" (Japanese: 突入ニルヴァーナ) | July 19, 2008 | June 28, 2010 (MGM Cartoons Channel Pakistan) |
Jiro infiltrates the White Guardians' headquarters at the time when Delphinium is visiting. When he encounters Primella, he also finds her with General Szabo who is working as Primella's servant. After a brief encounter, Jiro has a run-in with Delphinium and Deathroy. When Delphinium unleashes her shadow in defense and Deathroy unleashes Chimera, Jiro sets off a bomb he placed behind her. As their fight moves outside, Jiro sets off more bombs. Jiro manages to knock Delphinium off her feet, but Vermillion intervenes before Jiro can land the final blow as the White Guardians surround Jiro. Lucky for Jiro, Xie came to his rescue in a Mechat.
| 68 | 17 | "Slurping Sigh"; Transliteration: "Churuchuru no ahan" (Japanese: ちゅるちゅるのあはん) | July 26, 2008 | June 29, 2010 (MGM Cartoons Channel Pakistan) |
After thinking back to her last encounter with Bouquet, Lotarus enchants a butterfly with some of her power. Shu and Co. help a young girl carry a cart of food to her house. The butterfly that Lota enchanted spreads its pollen on the girl. The butterfly then puts Bouquet into a sleep where she dreams that she and Shu are finally married and have raised a family followed by a nightmare where Shu, Blue Dragon, Marumaro, Saber Tiger, and Hippopotamus are too cheerful. It soon becomes clear to Bouquet that Lota is behind this. The dream is soon disrupted when Marumaro's girl-chasing activity results in the butterfly's destruction.
| 69 | 18 | "City of Dragons"; Transliteration: "Ryuu no Machi" (Japanese: 竜の街) | August 2, 2008 | June 30, 2010 (MGM Cartoons Channel Pakistan) |
Conrad and a Knight Master named Griz join up with resistance headed up by Legolas and Daner in a nearby city and joins him in exploring the ruins of the Investiture Beings there. Shu, Bouquet, Marumaro, and Noi arrive at the city as Lotarus is encountered by Delphinium and Deathroy. Deathroy unleashes Chimera as White Brigade's weapons fire at Lotarus. She manages to evade the weapons and Delphinium's shadow before turning into her dragon form. While Lota deals with Delphinium and Deathroy, she also unleashes winged creatures that attacks the White Guardians. Lota takes the opportunity to escape while Delphinium and the White Guardians are occupied. Shu meets up with Legolas and Conrad and they descend into the caverns that are beneath the city. Noi then reads the messages found on the floors of the cavern. When Shu has Blue Dragon punch the artifact on the wall, he is sucked in.
| 70 | 19 | "What Lies Underground"; Transliteration: "Chika ni Nemuri Shimono" (Japanese: 地下に眠りしもの) | August 9, 2008 | July 1, 2010 (MGM Cartoons Channel Pakistan) |
Marumaro and Bouquet unleash Saber Tiger and Hippopotamus to follow Blue Dragon into the artifact. Hippopotamus pulls a lever that causes Shu and the others to fall in as well. Noi finds ancient technology that opens a hole in the ground as he, Shu, Bouquet, Marumaro, Conrad, Griz, and Daner go down it. Upon coming to a room, Noi works on its keypads to learn about the technology. The security system is soon activated as thin robots attack. Noi manages to find a way out which they escape through. They soon come across a room where Mikhail in his Red Dragon form is recuperating. Mikhail wakes up and takes out Griz who tried to attack him. Shu unleashes Blue Dragon as Conrad does a failed attack on Mikhail. Marumaro and Bouquet unleash Saber Tiger and Hippopotamus to help Blue Dragon. Noi turns into his dragon form and merges with Blue Dragon while Bouquet and Hippopotamus merge with Marumaro and Saber Tiger. After taking a hit from the Blue Dragon/Noi combination, Mikhail escapes. Shu then thinks about what Mikhail and Lotarus have said.
| 71 | 20 | "Rotta and Noe"; Transliteration: "Rotta to Noi" (Japanese: ロッタとノイ) | August 16, 2008 | July 2, 2010 (MGM Cartoons Channel Pakistan) |
Conrad, Griz, and Daner report what he has found underneath the city to Legolas. Upon remembering what Mikhail said, Noi tells Shu, Bouquet, and Marumaro that he is heading down into the ruins. Noi assumes his dragon form and flies down. While Bouquet and Marumaro have reached a disagreement, Conrad speaks to Shu about what to do with the Investiture Being ruins. Noi manages to get into the database when Lotarus in her dragon form arrives. A flying rock-like structure arrives floating above the city and is a threat if it lands on it. Shu unleashes Blue Dragon and checks it out. Panic occurs in the city as Griz and Daner speak with Bouquet and Marumaro. Blue Dragon attacks the rock structure as Bouquet, Marumaro, and Saber Tiger arrive to help. Bouquet and Hippopotamus merge with Blue Dragon and they attack the floating rock structure. Shu and Blue Dragon use whatever they can to destroy the rock structure and send its debris far. Lotarus takes her leave after this. Later that night, everyone is in the database room. As an eclipse occurs, secret data appears.
| 72 | 21 | "A New Dragon"; Transliteration: "Aratanaru Ryuu" (Japanese: 新たなる竜) | August 23, 2008 | July 5, 2010 (MGM Cartoons Channel Pakistan) |
Noi starts to tell everyone about the Investiture Beings' city. At the same time, the Investiture Being leader Rudolph sends Hildegard and Fagino to attack Shu. At the same time, soldiers of the White Guardians train with the Black Shadow Type-Three robots while their Brunacks charge up. When it is charged up, it is fired at the Black Shadow Type-Three robots who lose their shadowy forms. Hildegard and Fagino have arrived on the outskirts of the city. Legolas ends up evacuating the city while the others engage Hildegard and Fagino. Elsewhere, the White Guardians start with their ceremony. Shu, Marumaro, and Bouquet unleash their shadows. Conrad, Griz, and Daner face the two Investiture Beings in unarmed combat. Hildegard uses her wind abilities on them. Back at Nirvana, Primella starts to have visions at the ceremony. While Noi is working on the database, Bouquet and Hippopotamus merge with Blue Dragon while Hildegard and Fagino bring out their dragon forms in their Shadow form. As Hildegard has her dragon use its elasticity on Blue Dragon, Bouquet and Hippopotamus split from Blue Dragon. Hildegard and Fagino counter every move that is thrown at them and managed to take them down. They even managed to detect Bouquet's invisibility as they advance toward the ruins. After destroying the city, Hildegard and Fagino assume their dragon forms and escape. With the ruins also destroyed, Shu's group and Conrad's group go their separate ways.
| 73 | 22 | "Hipoman"; Transliteration: "Hipopotaman" (Japanese: ヒポポタマン) | August 30, 2008 | July 6, 2010 (MGM Cartoons Channel Pakistan) |
Shu, Bouquet, Marumaro, and Noi help two female bakers prepare a cake display for a town event to earn some money. But there are delays in the kitchen, and Noi and Bouquet has to stall the crowd until they are done. With help from Shu, they complete the cake display and use Saber Tiger to transport it there. When Blue Dragon bursts out the cake scaring the kids, Bouquet improvises by having Hippopotamus dress up as a superhero called Hipopotaman to fight Blue Dragon. Marumaro has Saber Tiger join the act to help Hipopotaman fight Blue Dragon. This only agitates Blue Dragon in the end who makes sure the party "ends with a bang".
| 74 | 23 | "Madam's Whisper"; Transliteration: "Madamu no Sasayaki" (Japanese: マダムのささやき) | September 6, 2008 | July 7, 2010 (MGM Cartoons Channel Pakistan) |
Fagino arrives in a nearby village and uses his Dragon Scales to turn four scarecrows into fat clones of Shu, Bouquet, Marumaro, and Noi. At the same time, Shu and the others are travelling to that village when Marumaro starts to develop a crush on a local lady. Upon arrival, the villagers start to fear them and hide in their houses. Vegetables soon start flying out of their houses towards them causing them to run. Bouquet unleashes Hippopotamus and uses his ability to disguise herself as the lady from before to find out what is going on. Their fat counterparts soon attack again demanding vegetables. Shu and the others watch this as the fat Shu summons a fat version of Blue Dragon which causes the villagers to flee into their houses and throw vegetables from the window toward them. Shu and Marumaro unleash Blue Dragon and Saber Tiger to knock them down. This does not fare well with the villagers, who flee into their houses. Shu and the others confront their fat counterparts who then assault them, but they capture the lady. When Shu and the others find them, they threaten to barbecue Shu's Blue Dragon. Bouquet and Hippopotamus merge with Blue Dragon and destroy the fat Saber Tiger and fat Blue Dragon while Saber Tiger uses his attack to destroy the fat clones, turning them back to scarecrows. After seeing the Dragon Scale emerge and break, Noi concludes that Fagino was behind this. Marumaro frees the lady only to discover that she is actually a Dragon Scale that came from Lota. Shu and his friends are then approached by a mysterious robed person.
| 75 | 24 | "A Ghost's Return"; Transliteration: "Shishi no Kikan" (Japanese: 死者の帰還) | September 13, 2008 | July 8, 2010 (MGM Cartoons Channel Pakistan) |
The mysterious person sends Shu's group to a nearby village where they meet up with Jiro and Xie (who first appeared to them as a fruit vendor). Meanwhile at Nirvana, the White Guardians still test out their Brunacks on a Black Shadow Type-Two in their campaign to hunt down Shadow Wielders and destroy their shadows. However, a malfunction occurs and the test weapons explode. Back with Shu and Co., they tell Jiro and Xie what they know about the Investiture Beings. Jiro also informs them that Delphinium is working with the White Guardians and what the White Guardians has been up to recently. They also explain that they've been finding out more about the White Guardians and even interrogated a former member of Gran Kingdom. Meanwhile, General Logi and Matilda flashback to their close call with Lotarus as they view their new giant robots. As the sides of General Logi and Dr. Tarkovsky prepare for battle as the Investiture Beings each watch from a distance, Shu decides to get involved.
| 76 | 25 | "Unheard Pleas"; Transliteration: "Todokanu Koe" (Japanese: とどかぬ声) | September 20, 2008 | July 9, 2010 (MGM Cartoons Channel Pakistan) |
Returning from a recon, Jiro and Xie inform Shu, Bouquet, Marumaro, and Noi about the White Guardians' advancement and where they have set up camp. With some persuasion from Shu and the others, Bouquet and Hippopotamus shapeshift their way onto the airship that Primella is on. When she does get to Primella, Bouquet tries to get her to help them in any way. Later that night, Shu and Jiro lead a raid upon the White Guardians camp. One of Dr. Tarkovsky's henchmen leads the ground attack with their new hand cannon weapons as the airship takes off. While the others handle the White Guardians, Shu and Blue Dragon go after the airship only to be held back by the hand cannon weapons. Saber Tiger throws himself in front of Blue Dragon and his left arm disappears in the process (though it regenerates by the next episode). Shu makes onto the ship where Primella was waiting, but Vermillion knocks him off where Shu falls into the forest below.
| 77 | 26 | "Her Wish"; Transliteration: "Kanojo no Nozomi" (Japanese: 彼女の望み) | September 27, 2008 | July 12, 2010 (MGM Cartoons Channel Pakistan) |
Recovering from the fall, Shu is informed by Jiro and Xie about the advancement in the war between the White Guardians and the forces of Rosekstan. Shu then realizes that the village Kluke is living in is right in the middle of the invading forces. Meanwhile, Kluke and Andropov notice one of Rosekstan's airships arriving in the village. When they start attacking, Andropov unleashes Alubujem who uses a flash attack to enable his and Kluke's escape. Kluke and Andropov are then pursued by the airship which destroys their house. Riding on a recovered Saber Tiger, Shu, Bouquet, Marumaro and Noi arrive at the ruins of Kluke's house. They then encounter two of the children that Kluke has been educating who tell them everything that has happened. Kluke and Andropov are still on the run from the airship until they crash her hovercycle into a tree. The airship unleashes their armored warriors who bring out their artificial shadows to attack. Andropov unleashes Alubujem to defend himself and Kluke. With some of them defeated, things weren't looking good for Andropov when he gets exhausted. He still tries to defend Kluke even though he has reached his limit. When Andropov is knocked down, Kluke throws herself in front of him as Phoenix is unleashed. As the armored warriors charge toward Kluke and Phoenix, Shu and Blue Dragon arrive and take out some of the warriors. Bouquet merges with Blue Dragon who continues to attack alongside Saber Tiger. Upon taking a hit from Blue Dragon, the airship retreats. Upon learning of the current crisis, Kluke and Andropov join up with Shu.
| 78 | 27 | "The Battle Begins"; Transliteration: "Kaisen" (Japanese: 開戦) | October 4, 2008 | July 13, 2010 (MGM Cartoons Channel Pakistan) |
Kluke uses Phoenix's ability to teleport the group to General Logi's hideout. When Shu shouts for a meeting with General Logi, he manages to allow it since he noticed Andropov with them. While Shu and Co. are talking with General Logi, Delphinium and Deathroy infiltrate General Logi's hideout looking for info that will help the White Guardians. As Shu and General Logi continue their conversation, one of Logi's men enters informing them that the White Guardians is attacking the Rosekstan forces. General Logi and Matilda leave as Andropov goes after them. As Delphinium and Deathroy find a room with giant exo-suits, General Logi talks with Andropov where the General still supports Andropov when he feels bad about what happened to Schneider. Shu and Blue Dragon leave to help the forces of Rosekstan fight the forces of the White Guardians. Blue Dragon destroys their Brunacks upon arrival. Outside of General Logi's hideout, Noi notices the White Guardians forces approaching in large numbers.
| 79 | 28 | "Soaring of the Sleipner"; Transliteration: "Sureipuniru Hishō" (Japanese: スレイプニル飛翔) | October 11, 2008 | July 14, 2010 (MGM Cartoons Channel Pakistan) |
General Logi's base is attacked by White Guardians. Kluke, Marumaro, Bouquet, and Andropov unleash their shadows. Kluke has Andropov use Alubujem to locate Shu who is still fighting the White Guardian soldiers in his area. When the others catch up, Shu comes up with a plan. Noi assumes his dragon form and merges with Shu while Bouquet and Hippopotamus merge with Saber Tiger. General Logi unleashes his giant exo-suit soldiers to help fight the White Guardians. The White Guardians' air force starts to turn the tides against giant exo-suits. Delphinium and Deathroy continue their infiltration until they are teleported outside by Matilda and Zephyrus. Meanwhile, at their floating city, the Investiture Beings discuss the war between the White Guardians and the forces of Rosekstan. As the battle rages on, Kluke uses Phoenix's ability to teleport her, Marumaro and the Bouquet/Saber Tiger, and some White Guardian soldiers away from Shu and the Noi/Blue Dragon. Jiro and Xie arrive and join the battle. Meanwhile, Deathroy unleashes Chimera against Matilda and Zephyrus. Vermillion confronts Shu and the Noi/Blue Dragon and starts to attack. As White Guardian soldiers charge toward General Logi's hideout, they are attacked by General Logi and Odin.
| 80 | 29 | "Power of the Oracle"; Transliteration: "Shintaku no Chikara" (Japanese: 神託の力) | October 18, 2008 | July 15, 2010 (MGM Cartoons Channel Pakistan) |
Kluke starts to get exhausted from various teleporting when getting some White Guardian soldiers away from the battle. After decimating half of the White Guardians' troops, General Logi clashes with Furioso. As the battle rages on, the Investiture Beings continue their meeting as Mikhail plans to take action upon both sides despite the objections of Hildegard and Lotarus. Shu and the Noi/Blue Dragon have begun their fight with Vermillion. Kluke finally collapses from the strain. Meanwhile, Delphinium and Matilda engage each other in battle which ends with Matilda having Zephyrus teleport her away from Delphinium and Deathroy. As Shu and Vermillion are locked in combat, Mikhail ends up leaving the floating city. General Logi and Furioso are still locked in combat until Furioso leads him into a trap consisting of the White Guardian soldiers firing their cannons at him. General Logi manages to evade it and makes a striking blow toward Furioso only for one of the White Guardian soldiers to throw himself in front of Furioso. Jiro and Xie continue their reconnaissance. General Logi's hideout blows up to reveal a weapon air fortress called Sleipnir which decimates some of the Brunacks. During Shu's fight with Vermillion, Mikhail arrives and assumes his Red Dragon form and starts attacking the Rosekstan soldiers and the White Guardian soldiers. Shu and the Noi/Blue Dragon managed to put up a barrier to protect Jiro and Xie. Shu ends up going into overdrive which starts to make the grounds unstable, but lets himself get beat due to the pleas of Kluke, Bouquet, and Marumaro.
| 81 | 30 | "A Divided World"; Transliteration: "Wakatareta Sekai" (Japanese: 分かたれた世界) | October 25, 2008 | July 16, 2010 (MGM Cartoons Channel Pakistan) |
Mikhail starts unleashing shockwaves that destroy the Brunacks. Rudolph's presence starts to become known at the battle as he uses his city's defenses to fire a powerful laser which petrifies Mikhail and rises a giant wall that does the same to some of the soldiers on both sides causing them to retreat. Moments later, Shu and the others are at an inn where Kluke is recuperating. Shu and Andropov get into an argument which is broken up by Bouquet. Later that evening, Kluke wakes up. During dinner, Bouquet uses her invisibility to get Andropov, Marumaro, and Noi out of the room to leave Shu and Kluke alone. Shu invites Kluke to go outside and have a talk about their relationship. The next morning, Shu, Bouquet, Marumaro, and Noi go their separate ways from Kluke and Andropov.
| 82 | 31 | "The Knight & The Girl"; Transliteration: "Kishi to Shōjo" (Japanese: 騎士と少女) | November 1, 2008 | July 19, 2010 (MGM Cartoons Channel Pakistan) |
At Nirvana, Vermillion and Furioso are overseeing the upgrades to their weapons and rethink of what had happened in their fight with Rosekstan. Vermillion later reviews about recent events with Dr. Tarkovsky which is overheard by Delphinium and Deathroy. Furioso has a new sword made and trains with his fellow soldiers. Vermillion later joins the practice and nearly bests Furioso. A flashback showed how Vermillion fought against Gran Kingdom when Nene was in power and how Vermillion joined up with Dr. Tarkovsky.
| 83 | 32 | "The Town of Gourmets"; Transliteration: "Bishoku no Machi" (Japanese: 美食の街) | November 8, 2008 | July 20, 2010 (MGM Cartoons Channel Pakistan) |
Shu, Bouquet, Marumaro, and Noi arrive in a ruins of a gourmet-themed town. They meet the town's mayor who recaps on how Fagino came to their town and had been dissatisfied with some of their gourmets. Fagino had made his own dish which was so good that everyone loved it. Before leaving, Fagino gave him a Dragon Scale. When the town wanted more of the dish, the town was thrown into chaos. After the story, the Dragon Scale the mayor was given causes him to unleash a demonic shadow that attacks the group. Upon the shadows being unleashed, Bouquet and Hippopotamus merge with Saber Tiger while Noi merges with Blue Dragon. Upon dodging the laser, acid balls, and wind attacks, the shadow is defeated by the Noi/Blue Dragon expelling the Dragon Scale from the mayor. Following that battle, Shu's group notices the weapon air fortress Sleipnir trying to penetrate the giant wall hinting to Shu that General Logi is trying find a way through it.
| 84 | 33 | "Matilda Strikes"; Transliteration: "Machiruda Shutsugeki" (Japanese: マチルダ出撃) | November 15, 2008 | July 21, 2010 (MGM Cartoons Channel Pakistan) |
At a Rosekstan base, General Logi oversees the upgrades to the giant exo-suits while on Sleipnir, Matilda is given the status on the giant wall. Rosekstan's forces still try to breach the wall as Shu, Bouquet, Marumaro, and Noi arrive at the nearest village. Matilda resolves to use a powerful laser that would guarantee the wall's destruction at the price of the nearest village. As Saber Tiger is riding the others toward the giant wall, they are ambushed by Matilda and the exo-suit warriors. Not wanting Matilda's plan to happen, Shu unleashes Blue Dragon as Matilda unleashes Zephyrus. Bouquet and Hippopotamus merge with Saber Tiger to fight the exo-suit warriors. After Blue Dragon takes a hit from Zephyrus, Noi transforms into his dragon form and merges with Blue Dragon. When the Noi/Blue Dragon manages to catch Zephyrus, Matilda orders her men on Sleipnir to fire the laser. Shu and the Noi/Blue Dragon use the forcefield ability to block the laser attack which was enough to overload the laser cannon on Sleipnir. Matilda then orders her forces to retreat. Later that day, General Logi gets word about Shu's interference. Shu and Co. are thanked by the villagers for their efforts to stop Rosekstan from sacrificing their village.
| 85 | 34 | "False Smile"; Transliteration: "Itsuwari no Egao" (Japanese: 偽りの笑顔) | November 22, 2008 | July 22, 2010 (MGM Cartoons Channel Pakistan) |
At Rosekstan, Primella has a vision of a three-way battle between the White Guardian, Shu, and Fagino and a vision where Lotarus kills Kluke in a flower field. Meanwhile, Shu and the Noi/Blue Dragon and Marumaro and the Bouquet/Saber Tiger are in combat with Hildegard. Hildegard then assumes his dragon form as the Noi/Blue Dragon goes after him. Though Hildegard gets away. At a Rosekstan base, General Logi thinks back to the battle against the White Guardians when Matilda enters telling Logi that Delphinium and Deathroy have surrendered to them. Shu, Bouquet, Marumaro, and Noi arrive in a nearby town where they notice a factory. Back at Rosekstan's base, Delphinium is being interrogated by Captain Varenko. Meanwhile, at Nirvana, Primella thinks about the vision she had and runs out of her room with General Szabo not far behind only to run into Vermillion. Shu and the others appear outside of the factory when the town leader arrives. He sicks some robots on them as Shu and Marumaro unleash their shadows. They defeat the robots and take the village leader hostage as they enter the factory. Upon entering, they discover slaves working on the furnace and robots. Shu and Marumaro free the slaves and shut down the factory. Minutes later, the slaves start fighting back against the robot soldiers. Shu manages to defeat some of them as Hildegard arrives. Hildegard unleashes her dragon in shadow form as Noi merges with Blue Dragon while Bouquet and Hippopotamus merge with Saber Tiger. During the battle, Rudolph instructs Hildegard to leave the area at once. Back at Nirvana, Vermillion learns of Primella's vision and decides to go with her and General Szabo seeking an opportunity to fight Shu again.
| 86 | 35 | "The Final Tribulation"; Transliteration: "Saigo no Shiren" (Japanese: 最後の試練) | November 29, 2008 | July 23, 2010 (MGM Cartoons Channel Pakistan) |
At a nearby town, Shu has an encounter with Rudolph in the form of a male fortune teller. When in another dimension, Rudolph unleashes winged creatures upon Shu causing him to unleash Blue Dragon. Rudolph also brings out his dragon in Shadow form. Upon managing to pull off an attack on Rudolph, Shu ends up outside of the town as Rudolph unleashes his winged creatures upon it. Shu and Blue Dragon end up fighting them as some of them reach the city. Bouquet and Hippopotamus merge with Saber Tiger to fight off the winged creatures. Noi arrives and merges with Blue Dragon who begins to destroy a lot of the winged creatures. When Rudolph has the winged creatures attacking Marumaro and the Bouquet/Saber Tiger fall back and attack Shu and the Noi/Blue Dragon, the winged creatures ended up destroyed by the Noi/Blue Dragon. Rudolph then leaves after that.
| 87 | 36 | "The Deciding Moment"; Transliteration: "Ketsudan no Koku" (Japanese: 決断の刻) | December 6, 2008 | July 26, 2010 (MGM Cartoons Channel Pakistan) |
The Investiture Beings have a meeting where they discuss what happened during the times of the Seven Soldiers of Light, the fight against Nene, when Zola went rogue, Mikhail's encounters with Shu, and Noi deserting the Investiture Beings. Outside of Lotarus' encounters with Bouquet, they discuss the battle between Rosekstan and the White Guardians and what Rudolph had to do to stop it. Fagino and Hildegard then bring up their encounters with Shu's group. After a talk revolving around Jiro, Kluke, the White Brigade's goals, and Rudolph's encounter with Shu, the scale-like mechanism they are floating over floats towards Rudolph. After that, Rudolph unleashes his winged creatures as the Investiture Beings lead them throughout the world as they are noticed by the White Guardians, Jiro and Xie, Kluke and Andropov, Legolas and Conrad's group, and even Shu's group as Rudolph's voice is heard.
| 88 | 37 | "Vermillion"; Transliteration: "Vaamirian" (Japanese: ヴァーミリアン) | December 13, 2008 | July 27, 2010 (MGM Cartoons Channel Pakistan) |
The Investiture Beings have begun their invasion by attacking towns. Rudolph even breaks part of the giant wall he had placed there to direct some of its remains toward some villages. When it came to the latest debris heading to a town, it is redirected by Shu and the Noi/Blue Dragon and Marumaro and the Bouquet/Saber Tiger. Afterward, Vermillion arrives with Primella and General Szabo. Primella explains her vision to Shu over some tea. Shu even has a private talk with Vermillion. Following that, Rudolph appears. As Shu unleashes Blue Dragon and Noi merges with it, Marumaro unleashes Saber Tiger and Bouquet and Hippopotamus merge with Saber Tiger. Vermillion gets Primella and General Szabo to a safe point and tells General Szabo to get Primella out of here. When Shu and Marumaro are being overwhelmed, Vermillion shows up and duels Rudolph enough for Shu's group to get away with Primella and General Szabo. As the duel between Vermillion and Rudolph rages on, an explosion is seen from where their battle is.
| 89 | 38 | "A Beautiful World"; Transliteration: "Utsukushiki Sekai" (Japanese: 美しき世界) | December 20, 2008 | July 28, 2010 (MGM Cartoons Channel Pakistan) |
With Vermillion dead, Rudolph has the other Investiture Beings continue their invasion. When Shu and his group go their separate ways to look for Kluke, Shu and Primella run into Lotarus. Meanwhile, Delphinium and Deathroy have a run-in with Hildegard and end up battling. After a talk with Primella, Shu has a duel with Lotarus. Lotarus brings out her dragon in shadow form while Shu unleashes Blue Dragon. Lotarus manages to overwhelm Shu, but decides to spare his life. Meanwhile, Jiro and Xie have been taken prisoner by General Logi.
| 90 | 39 | "Resurrecting Powers"; Transliteration: "Yomigaeru Chikara" (Japanese: よみがえる力) | December 27, 2008 | July 29, 2010 (MGM Cartoons Channel Pakistan) |
When Rosekstan's troops trap some of the winged creatures, Matilda uses Sleipnir's laser cannon to eliminate them. As Jiro and Xie are prisoners in Rosekstan's dungeon, General Logi and his troops fight off the winged creatures that came with Hildegard. Jiro and Xie managed to escape while General Logi and Hildegard unleash their shadows. Jiro manages to confiscate one of the armors and joins General Logi in the fight. General Logi and the armored troops try to take Hildegard down with a powerful attack, but no avail. Hildegard wrecks the armor Jiro was in causing it to crash to the ground. Jiro tries to use his sword to fight Hildegard who is too quick for him. Hildegard ends up using his power to awaken Jiro's shadow Minotaur as Xie pushes Jiro away from Hildegard's attack. With Xie wounded, Jiro decides to use Minotaur to fight Hildegard. Minotaur catches the attack and throws it back at Hildegard. With Hildegard knocked off her feet upon her shadow being punched by Minotaur, Jiro has Minotaur use his Waves of Rage to defeat Hildegard. Hildegard assumes her dragon form and escapes. Meanwhile, in another location, Noi in his dragon form notices a temple in the cliffside.
| 91 | 40 | "The Lost Palace"; Transliteration: "Ushinawareta Shinden" (Japanese: 失われた神殿) | January 10, 2009 | July 30, 2010 (MGM Cartoons Channel Pakistan) |
In a stormy volcanic area, Noi runs into Legolas nearby Z'Mey: a dragon sanctuary. Conrad also arrives with Griz and Daner. Meanwhile, Marumaro and Bouquet continue their search for Kluke. At a nearby town, Kluke is shown tending to the injured. Daner shows Noi an artifact that Conrad's group had found. Noi then leads Legolas, Conrad, Griz and Daner into Z'Mey and go through many obstacles to get to the main chamber. Meanwhile, Shu sees a nearby town that is annihilated when Rudolph arrives. Shu and Rudolph unleash their shadows and fight. Noi places the artifact in the area and it unveiling a shuttle called Mast Driver and its pyramid-like platform. The light it emits is noticed by Shu and Rudolph as Rudolph leaves. Meanwhile, Bouquet and Marumaro have met up with Kluke at the area where Primella's vision of her took place.
| 92 | 41 | "Flower Garden"; Transliteration: "Hanazono" (Japanese: 花園) | January 17, 2009 | August 2, 2010 (MGM Cartoons Channel Pakistan) |
Having met up with Kluke, Bouquet and Marumaro work to prevent Primella's vision from coming true. Meanwhile, Noi researches the pyramid structure that just surfaced. Kluke finally learns about an attempt on her life as Lotarus arrives with some winged creatures. Shu and Primella meet up with General Szabo while General Logi's forces advance. Delphinium wakes up in a cottage and learns from the man who found her that Deathroy had kept her safe from Hildegard. Marumaro unleashes Saber Tiger to fight Lotarus while Bouquet gets Kluke to safety. Andropov arrives to help Marumaro. When Kluke and Bouquet end up in a flower field, Lotarus attacks Kluke, but her attack missed Kluke and Lotarus departs with her attack force. Meanwhile, Shu, Primella, and General Szabo arrive at an area where the forces of Rosekstan and the White Guardians are going to fight each other.
| 93 | 42 | "The Munchy-Bafoon"; Transliteration: "Mogumogu no bafuun" (Japanese: モグモグのバフ〜ン) | January 24, 2009 | August 3, 2010 (MGM Cartoons Channel Pakistan) |
Shu gains an unlikely audience with Dr. Tarkovsky who learns about Vermillion's demise. The White Guardian soldiers set up a trap filled with food which Fagino falls for when he transforms into his dragon form. Some of the food he ate contained electrical spikes that seal up Fagino's mouth. As the White Guardian soldiers are assaulting Fagino, Primella receives another vision. Furioso does a fatal blow toward Fagino only to discover that it was a clone made from a Dragon Scale. Fagino emerges and overloads the spikes that were placed in his mouth. Fagino then attacks the White Guardian soldiers. As Fagino tries to destroy Furioso, Shu unleashes Blue Dragon and attacks Fagino. With Blue Dragon keeping Fagino busy, Furioso ends up slicing off his right arm causing Fagino to retreat. Dr. Tarkovsky then tells Furioso and his troops to spare Shu and Blue Dragon.
| 94 | 43 | "Battle of Zmey"; Transliteration: "Zumei kōbō" (Japanese: ズメイ攻防) | January 31, 2009 | August 4, 2010 (MGM Cartoons Channel Pakistan) |
Following the vision of Primella, Dr. Tarkovsky leads Shu and the rest of the White Guardians to Z'Mey. At Z'Mey, Noi is researching the Mast Driver just as Bouquet, Marumaro, Kluke, and Andropov arrive. Shu also arrives with Primella as the conversation continues on Dr. Tarkovsky's airship. After the conversation, one of the soldiers enter and report that the Investiture Beings' winged creatures are heading their way. The White Guardians prepare their defenses against the winged creatures. As Conrad and Griz join the fight, the winged creatures overwhelm the White Guardians. Upon the shadows being unleashed, Bouquet and Hippopotamus merge with Saber Tiger while Noi merges with Blue Dragon. Kluke and Andropov defend the shuttle. Just then, some dragons emerge from the ground surrounding Z'Mey and start decimating the White Brigade soldiers. With help from Conrad and Griz, Shu and Blue Dragon destroy Spark Dragon. Amethyst Dragon then kills Griz and Daner. As Shu starts to charge Amethyst Dragon, Conrad uses his sword to block the attack emitted from the arrival of Hildegard and Fagino.
| 95 | 44 | "To the Sky"; Transliteration: "Sora he" (Japanese: 空へ) | February 7, 2009 | August 5, 2010 (MGM Cartoons Channel Pakistan) |
Dr. Tarkovsky is given the status of the Mast Driver. Fagino's shadow does an attack on the Noi/Blue Dragon which causes Noi to separate. Marumaro and the Bouquet/Saber Tiger managed to destroy Blizzard Dragon. Conrad sacrifices his life to protect Shu from Fagino's attack. While Marumaro and Andropov keep Moody Dragon busy, Kluke has some words with Furioso. When Amethyst Dragon starts to attack them, it is destroyed by Rosekstan's Sleipnir airship as Jiro arrives. Hildegard has her shadow constrict Blue Dragon as Fagino moves in to eliminate Noi only to be intercepted by General Logi. Blue Dragon is freed by the armored warriors as General Logi sends Shu and Noi to the Mast Driver. Jiro unleashes Minotaur to fight Phantom Dragon allowing Bouquet and Marumaro to get to the Mast Driver. Furioso manages to blind Moody Dragon before destroying it. Phantom Dragon is destroyed by a combined attack from Jiro's Minotaur and Andropov's Alubujem. Blue Dragon manages to throw Shu and Noi onto the Mast Driver. Hildegard and Fagino arrive to destroy the shuttle with a combined attack. Furioso sacrifices his life to protect the Mast Driver from their attack as it takes off.
| 96 | 45 | "Legion of Elite Species"; Transliteration: "Joui seimeitai" (Japanese: 上位生命体) | February 14, 2009 | August 6, 2010 (MGM Cartoons Channel Pakistan) |
Rudolph recalls Hildegard and Fagino to his castle when the Mast Driver approaches their realm. As the Mast Driver approaches the area, strange aircraft attack. From within their ship, Shu and Marumaro send Blue Dragon and Saber Tiger out to fight them. With help from Noi, Blue Dragon and Saber Tiger trick the aircraft into crashing into each other. They finally arrive at the Investiture Beings' castle. Fagino is sent to attack them and unleashes his shadow. The other Investiture Beings watch from their castle.
| 97 | 46 | "Castle Azure"; Transliteration: "Tenkai no shiro" (Japanese: 天界の城) | February 21, 2009 | August 9, 2010 (MGM Cartoons Channel Pakistan) |
When Fagino attacks, Noi gives Shu the ability to merge with Blue Dragon to form a full version of Blue Dragon. However, something happens to cause Blue Dragon to not be able to move. Bouquet and Hippopotamus merge with Saber Tiger to defend him from Fagino. Shu manages to get control of it just as Marumaro and the Bouquet/Saber Tiger are defeated. Upon taking a beating from the Shu/Blue Dragon, Fagino assumes his dragon form and fights back. When Blue Dragon gets the upper hand, Fagino unleashes energies and quickly punches Blue Dragon. When Fagino and the Shu/Blue Dragon's attacks collide, Blue Dragon's attack goes through and destroys Fagino. News of Fagino's destruction reaches the other Investiture Beings. As Shu is recovering from the experience, Rudolph begins to broadcast a transmission throughout his realm where it revealed what happened with Lotarus' encounter with Noi back at the Investiture Beings ruins.
| 98 | 47 | "Rotta"; Transliteration: "Rotta" (Japanese: ロッタ) | February 28, 2009 | August 10, 2010 (MGM Cartoons Channel Pakistan) |
When Rudolph finds Lotarus guilty of what happened in her encounter with Noi, Lotarus is forced to fight Hildegard. When Lotarus manages to get Hildegard's elongated head, arms, and tail stuck, she is caught by surprise by the emergence of Hildegard's second head. When Hildegard frees himself/herself, Hildegard attacks Lotarus just as Shu arrives, but it was actually Bouquet in disguise as a diversion for Shu to have Blue Dragon attack Hildegard. Shu has Blue Dragon catch Lotarus and give her to Bouquet. Shu then engages Rudolph. After a brief talk, Shu and Rudolph unleash their shadows. Bouquet and Hippopotamus merge with Saber Tiger while Shu merges with Blue Dragon. As Primella starts to suddenly glow, the Shu/Blue Dragon charges toward Rudolph.
| 99 | 48 | "The Final Battle"; Transliteration: "Saigo no kessen" (Japanese: 最後の決戦) | March 7, 2009 | August 11, 2010 (MGM Cartoons Channel Pakistan) |
The battle between Rudolph and the Shu/Blue Dragon begins. Rudolph's shadow is matching blows with the Shu/Blue Dragon and nearly defeated Marumaro and the Bouquet/Saber Tiger. Rudolph starts to overwhelm the Shu/Blue Dragon. When Rudolph overwhelms the Shu/Blue Dragon sending him into a ditch with Primella and Dr. Tarkovsky falling after him. The attack also defeats Marumaro and the Bouquet/Hippopotamus. Noi even tries to have some words with Rudolph. Primella continues to glow and makes contact with Shu mentioning how she was a part of Zola before being separated from her by Killer Bat. After the talk, the Shu/Blue Dragon rises to continue his fight with Rudolph. Noi assumes his dragon form and tries to fight Rudolph, but to no avail. Before Rudolph can finish Noi off, the Shu/Blue Dragon saves him. Bouquet re-merges with Saber Tiger to assist Shu in the fight with Rudolph.
| 100 | 49 | "Kaizer Suverto"; Transliteration: "Kaizaa Suveruto" (Japanese: カイザースヴェルト) | March 14, 2009 | August 12, 2010 (MGM Cartoons Channel Pakistan) |
Shu continues his fight with Rudolph. After taking a blow from Blue Dragon, Rudolph assumes his dragon form. Rudolph and the Shu/Blue Dragon are easily matched until Rudolph manages to strangle him. He repels Noi and the Bouquet/Saber Tiger. When Rudolph starts to finish off the Shu/Blue Dragon, Noi unleashes his power which enables his dragon form to get bigger. With this occurrence, Noi engages Rudolph. Both of them are easily matched. Right when Rudolph was about to finish off Noi, he is hit by an attack launched by the Shu/Blue Dragon. Rudolph enters a portal that he created and the Shu/Blue Dragon follows him into it. The Shu/Blue Dragon follows Rudolph into an area where he uses a war machine to defeat the Shu/Blue Dragon. The Investiture Beings' castle is starting to change shape into a large dragon-like war machine. Kluke uses her forcefield ability to protect them from its attack. Just then, Rosekstan's forces arrive as Shu's unconscious body is approached by Primella.
| 101 | 50 | "Memories"; Transliteration: "Kioku" (Japanese: 記憶) | March 21, 2009 | August 16, 2010 (MGM Cartoons Channel Pakistan) |
Rosekstan begins their attack on Rudolph's war machine. Rudolph then unleashes his winged creatures, a bunch of Amethyst Dragons, a Moody Dragon, and a Phantom Dragon. Jiro, Kluke, Marumaro, Bouquet, Andropov, and General Logi unleash their shadows to attack the war machine while Noi looks for Shu. Meanwhile, Shu makes contact with Zola's spirit. As the battle progresses, Rudolph's war machine decimates most of the Rosekstan fleet. Just as one of the winged creatures is about to attack Jiro, he is saved by Delphinium and Deathroy (who have unleashed Chimera) as they arrive with reinforcements. Sleipnir fires its cannon at Rudolph's war machine but to no avail. Rudolph then fires the attack which decimates more Rosekstan airships as Noi charges towards the war machine. With Noi distracting the machine, the others combine their attacks on the war machine which overload the forcefield. Shu manages to get to his feet and runs into Primella and Dr. Tarkovsky. Even when an opening is made in the war machine, General Logi is wounded by a Blizzard Dragon, Andropov is attacked by a winged creature, Delphinium and Deathroy are attacked by Phantom Dragon as Minotaur tries to repel it, Spark Dragon shocks Bouquet and Marumaro, Kluke's forcefield is overwhelmed by Phantom Dragon as Jiro is attacked by Amethyst Dragon, and Noi is shot down by Moody Dragon. As Primella starts to glow, Shu runs to her and both of them start to plummet.
| 102 | 51 | "Blue Sky"; Transliteration: "Aoi sora" (Japanese: 青い空) | March 28, 2009 | August 17, 2010 (MGM Cartoons Channel Pakistan) |
Things aren't looking good for Rosekstan and Shu's allies. Just then, the Shu/Blue Dragon emerges with Primella in its hand. Primella wakes up as she is given to Dr. Tarkovsky and General Szabo. Rudolph emerges from the war machine and fights the Shu/Blue Dragon. They match blow to blow until Rudolph uses his intangibility to keep the Shu/Blue Dragon from hitting him and then multiplies to attack the Shu/Blue Dragon. With help from Primella, the Shu/Blue Dragon destroys the duplicates. The Shu/Blue Dragon collides its punch with Rudolph's punch. The hopes of Shu's allies, Marumaro's siblings, and even the thought-dead Conrad, Griz, and Daner help give the Shu/Blue Dragon the strength to fight Rudolph. Their combined attacks results in an explosion that destroys the winged creatures and the dragons that Rudolph had summoned. As the Shu/Blue Dragon falls to the ground, Rudolph starts to crack up and explode taking his war machine with him. The Shu/Blue Dragon regresses back to Shu who is then caught by Noi. With their castle destroyed, Noi, Hildegard, and Lota take their leave. At Nirvana, Shu, Marumaro, and Bouquet are given their medals by Primella.

== DVD releases ==
=== Region 1 ===
==== North America ====
===== Blue Dragon =====
| Name | Date | Discs | Episodes | Reference |
|---|---|---|---|---|
| Volume 1 | September 16, 2008 | 1 | 1–5 | |
| Volume 2 | November 18, 2008 | 1 | 6–9 | |
| Volume 3 | January 6, 2009 | 1 | 10–13 | |

=== Region 2 ===
==== Japan ====
===== Blue Dragon =====
| Name | Date | Discs | Episodes |
|---|---|---|---|
| Volume 1 | August 17, 2007 | 1 | 1–4 |
| Volume 2 | September 19, 2007 | 1 | 5–8 |
| Volume 3 | October 17, 2007 | 1 | 9–12 |
| Volume 4 | November 21, 2007 | 1 | 13–16 |
| Volume 5 | December 19, 2007 | 1 | 17–20 |
| Volume 6 | January 16, 2008 | 1 | 21–24 |
| Volume 7 | February 20, 2008 | 1 | 25–28 |
| Volume 8 | March 19, 2008 | 1 | 29–32 |
| Volume 9 | April 25, 2008 | 1 | 33–36 |
| Volume 10 | May 21, 2008 | 1 | 37–40 |
| Volume 11 | June 18, 2008 | 1 | 41–44 |
| Volume 12 | June 18, 2008 | 1 | 45–48 |
| Volume 13 | July 16, 2008 | 1 | 49–51 |

===== Blue Dragon: Tenkai no Shichi Ryu =====
| Name | Date | Discs | Episodes |
|---|---|---|---|
| Volume 1 | July 16, 2008 | 1 | 1–3 |
| Volume 2 | August 20, 2008 | 1 | 4–7 |
| Volume 3 | September 17, 2008 | 1 | 8–11 |
| Volume 4 | October 15, 2008 | 1 | 12–15 |
| Volume 5 | November 19, 2008 | 1 | 16–19 |
| Volume 6 | December 16, 2008 | 1 | 20–23 |
| Volume 7 | January 20, 2009 | 1 | 24–27 |
| Volume 8 | February 18, 2009 | 1 | 28–31 |
| Volume 9 | March 18, 2009 | 1 | 32–35 |
| Volume 10 | April 14, 2009 | 1 | 36–39 |
| Volume 11 | May 20, 2009 | 1 | 40–43 |
| Volume 12 | June 17, 2009 | 1 | 44–47 |
| Volume 13 | July 15, 2009 | 1 | 48–51 |

==== United Kingdom ====
===== Blue Dragon =====
| Name | Date | Discs | Episodes | Reference |
|---|---|---|---|---|
| Volume 1 & 2 | June 1, 2009 | 2 | 1–8 | |
| Volume 3 & 4 | July 27, 2009 | 2 | 9–16 | |
| Volume 5 & 6 | September 21, 2009 | 2 | 17–24 | |
| Complete Series 1 | February 8, 2010 | 6 | 1–24 | |
