= Ray St. Germain =

Ray St. Germain OM
- Born: July 29, 1940; Winnipeg, Manitoba, Canada
- Died: June 25, 2024 (aged 83) Winnipeg, Manitoba, Canada
- Genres: Country and rockabilly
- Occupations: Singer, author and television host

Ray St. Germain OM (July 29, 1940 – June 25, 2024) was a Canadian singer, author, and television host. He was the presenter for the 1969 Canadian variety television series Time for Living and the 2006 federal Liberal candidate for the Winnipeg Centre constituency. In 2005, he released his autobiography, I Wanted to Be Elvis, So What Was I Doing in Moose Jaw?.

St. Germain wrote, produced, and hosted the nationally syndicated and award-winning show Big Sky Country that aired for 13 years on the Global Television Network. He worked with the Aboriginal Peoples Television Network (APTN), producing and hosting the series Rhythms of the Métis. He was a voice actor for the children's series Tipi Tales that airs on the Treehouse Network and APTN. He was also a founding member of the Alberta Old Tyme Fiddlers' Association, which started the Grand North American Old Time Fiddle Championship.

St. Germain hosted over 600 television shows on CBC Television, Global Television Network, and APTN. He was an on-air personality and program manager with NCI-FM Radio for seven years and hosted a program Métis Hour X2 on Saturday mornings for the Manitoba Métis Federation. He entertained Canadian Forces stationed overseas with concerts in Germany, Israel, and Cyprus.

St. Germain received awards for his contributions to Canadian culture, including the Order of Manitoba, Aboriginal Order of Canada, the Order of the Sash – Saskatoon and Prince Albert, and a spot on the Aboriginal Wall of Honour in the Winnipeg Friendship Centre. He was inducted into the Canadian Country Music Hall of Fame in September 2010.

St. Germain died in Winnipeg on June 25, 2024, at the age of 83.

== Discography ==
=== Albums ===
Year	Album
1968	Ray St. Germain
1969	Time for Livin'
1970	Everybody Has to Fall in Love
1978	Ray St. Germain
1983	Ray St. Germain Live
1985	Thank God, I'm Métis
1990	There's No Love Like Our Love
1996	Greatest Hits Vol. 1
2003	My Many Moods
2005	Family Christmas
2007	Show Me the Way to Jerusalem
2008	Life Ain't Hard

=== Singles ===
Year	Single	CAN Country	Album
1978	"Please Don't Hurt Me"	28	Ray St. Germain
1979	"Thank You for Loving Me"	41	Ray St. Germain
1980	"Anyway You Want Me"	37	single only
