= Sounds Good =

Canadian music television miniseries

- Genre: music
- Written by: Jim McKenna
- Presented by: Jim McKenna
- Country of origin: Canada
- Original language: English
- No. of seasons: 1
- No. of episodes: 4

Production
- Producer: Jim McKenna
- Running time: 60 minutes

Original release
- Network: CBC Television
- Release: 4 August – 28 September 1976

Sounds Good is a Canadian music television program that aired on CBC Television in 1976.

== Premise ==
This four-episode program featured particular genres of modern music and various performers. Jim McKenna hosted Sounds Good except the country music episode.

- Folk: featured Ellen McIlwaine, Don McLean, Myles and Lenny and David Wiffen
- Country (10 September 1976): featured Carroll Baker, Tim Daniels (later of Comin' Up Country), Mary Lou Del Gatto, Prairie Oyster
- Disco: featured Crack of Dawn, Soul Express, Sweet Blindness and Rick Wamil
- Jazz: featured Moe Koffman Sextet, Peter Appleyard, Aura and Clark Terry

Sounds Good was hastily produced on a low (approximately CA$40,000) budget when CBC's Studio 7 became unexpectedly available for three days. A previously-planned television feature on Nellie McClung was scheduled to film there but production was cancelled when ACTRA objected to the choice of an American actor portraying McClung.

== Scheduling ==
The hour-long episodes were broadcast on 4 August 10 September, 18 and 28 September 1976.
