= Country Road =

Country Road(s) may refer to:

== Music ==
- Country Road (band), a country music band from Sweden
- "Country Road" (song), James Taylor song
- "Take Me Home, Country Roads," a song by American musician John Denver, also known as "Country Roads"

== Other uses ==
- Country Road (brand), a clothing brand made by the Country Road Group
- Country Roads (TV series), a 1973 Canadian TV series

== See also ==
- Back road, a secondary road, often in the country
- Country lane, a narrow road in the countryside
- Country Roads & Other Places, a 1969 album by Gary Burton
