= April Verch =

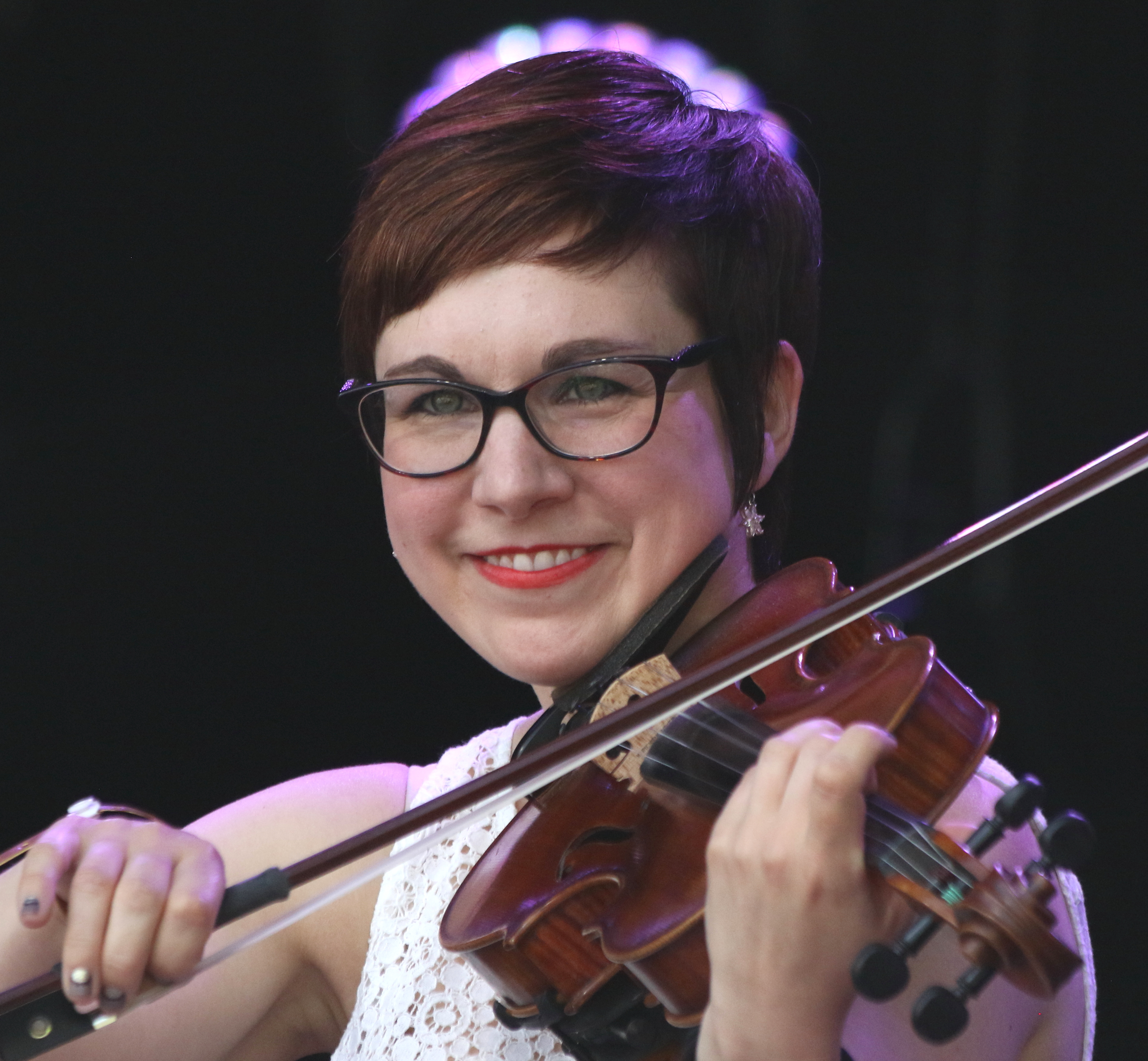
- Verch in 2016

Background information
- Born: April 7, 1978 (age 48); Rankin, Ontario, Canada
- Occupations: Fiddler, step dancer
- Instrument: Fiddle
- Years active: 1992–present
- Member of: April Verch Band
- Website: www.aprilverch.com

April Verch (born April 7, 1978) is a Canadian fiddler, singer, and step dancer raised in the community of Rankin, Ontario, located approximately 15 kilometres (9.3 mi) southwest from Pembroke, Ontario. The youngest daughter of Ralph and Muriel Verch, April began step dancing at age three with her first step dance teachers, Buster and Pauline Brown, and began learning fiddle at age six from Pembroke fiddler Rob Dagenais, shortly after receiving her first violin as a birthday present. Throughout her childhood, April played both old time fiddle and classical violin, having competed and having won awards at fiddle contests inside and outside Ontario, as well as regularly performing with the Deep River Symphony Orchestra over that period. She also competed and won numerous awards for her step dancing in that time frame as well.

In addition, April, with her older sister Tawnya Verch (piano, vocals and step dance), and cousins Nathan and Jonathan Pilatzke (fiddles, step dance) were in a quartet named "The Duelling Dancers", regularly competing and entertaining over this period throughout Ontario. Her local musical environment included listening to her father's country band rehearsing and performing, as well as hearing lively music at both church and community dances in the Pembroke area.

== Career ==
Verch attended Berklee College of Music in Boston with music instruction under fiddlers Matt Glaser and Darol Anger before embarking on her professional career. After one year of study, Verch would move back to Canada, landing in Saskatoon, Saskatchewan, and played as a backup fiddler for Vancouver-based Celtic pop band "Mad Pudding" and veteran Canadian country singer Tommy Hunter, as well as performing solo and teaching privately in Saskatoon, before moving home to Pembroke, Ontario. Verch began her full time touring career in 2000 and has performed internationally, including festival, theatre and performing arts centre appearances in Canada, USA, China, Australia, United Kingdom, Belgium, Sweden, Denmark, Finland, Norway, Germany, Switzerland, Austria, France, Spain, Czech Republic and the United Arab Emirates. She has also presented workshops, master classes and lectures as part of her tours and at selected music camps. April Verch's other performances have included the roles of soloist, leader of "The April Verch Band," cast performer with the fiddle group "Bowfire", and backup fiddler with various musical acts for recording sessions.

After a solo concert in 2000 was attended by Rounder Records' Ken Irwin, Verch was signed to Rounder Records. In 2001, "Verchuosity" became her debut album for the label and received a JUNO nomination for Best Roots/Traditional Solo Album. While she is best known for playing traditional Ottawa Valley style fiddle tunes, Verch's repertoire branches into many other fiddle styles. She has appeared as performer and teacher at Mark O'Connor's Fiddle Camps, and performing as a fiddler, singer, and dancer on the PBS television series, "Song of the Mountains". Since 2016, Verch has also been performing in a duo with veteran American bluegrass artist Joe Newberry. Verch received a second Juno nomination in 2020 for the album "Once a Day" in the Traditional Roots Album category.

== Personal life ==
Verch is married to Cody Walters, a musician who is originally from Kansas, and they live together in Horse Shoe, North Carolina.

== Discography ==
- Top of the Hill (2020)
- Once a Day (2019)
- Going Home (with Joe Newberry) (2017)
- The April Verch Anthology (2017)
- The Newpart (2015)
- Ottawa Valley Stepdancing With April Verch (2014)
- Bright Like Gold (2013)
- That's How We Run (2011)
- Band of Gypsies (with Strung: April Verch, Doug Cox, Tony McManus, Cody Walters) (2009)
- Steal the Blue (2008)
- Take Me Back (2006)
- From Where I Stand (2003)
- Verchuosity (2001)
- Fiddleicious (1998)
- Fiddle Talk (1995)
- Springtime Fiddle (1992)

== Other releases ==
In addition to her album releases, Verch has also released a book of original fiddle tunes, a Canadian fiddle method book via Mel Bay Publications, and a self produced instructional step dance DVD.

== Accolades ==
- 1988 & 1989 Maritime Fiddle Festival 10-12 Winner
- 1997 Canadian Grand Masters Fiddle Champion
- 1998 Canadian Open Old Time Fiddle Championship Champion.
- 2010 Performer at the opening ceremony of the 2010 Winter Olympics in Vancouver.
