= Grand North American Old Time Fiddle Championship =

Long-running Canadian traditional music festival

- Genre: Old-time music
- Dates: Third weekend of July
- Location: Edmonton, Alberta
- Years active: 40
- Founders: Alberta Old Tyme Fiddler's Association
- Website: https://www.wildrosefiddlers.org/

The Grand North American Old Time Fiddle Championship is the longest-running annual fiddle contest in Alberta, held in mid-July. The event started in 1981, becoming part of Klondike Days (known as K-Days) in the 1990s, and with virtual contests held during the COVID-19 pandemic in 2020 and 2021. Prior to the official event, similar contests held as fundraisers occurred in the late 1970s and early 1980s to help local communities. Several of its winners have gone onto place in the top three of the Canadian Grand Masters, including several winners, and in recent years prize money has been allocated to the best three Albertan fiddlers to help pay for travel to the Grand Masters.

== History ==
=== Context ===
Fiddling in Alberta dates back centuries, starting with Métis fiddlers, with other influences from Scots, and eventually country and bluegrass as old time fiddling grew in popularity. In her thesis on old tyme fiddling clubs, Lisa Anne Stormer argues that fiddling was not just about preserving styles, but also about social gatherings in rural areas. People would gather at neighbours’ homes for jam sessions, similar to a kitchen party or ceilidh elsewhere in Canada, leading to both a way to transmit music and a way to reinforce social networks in rural places. Referencing the Wild Rose Old Tyme Fiddler's Association in particular, Stormer notes that “the music serves as the means for bringing people together and provides a common interest among the club’s members that helps to bond them together.”

The Wild Rose association grew from a necessity to help promote and fund fiddling contests and gatherings in Alberta, founded in 1989. Their jam sessions help to promote fiddling in the Edmonton area, providing new tunes, technical help, and encouragement to participants. Several of the musicians at their jam sessions compete annually at the Grand North Americans.

=== Origins of contest ===
The original contest started from the efforts of Art “Lefty” Vollrath, Art Logan, Ernie Cunningham, Ray St. Germain, Calvin Vollrath and Gilbert Anderson, who formed the Alberta Old Tyme Fiddlers Association. They aspired to offer a contest with qualified judges and large cash prizes. To reach this goal, they held dances to fundraise for the prize pool and judges’ fees. In 1981, they were able to hold their first contest in Wabamun, Alberta from July 17th to 18th.

Organizers hoped that the Grand North American Old Time Fiddle Championship would eventually grow to the level of the American Grand Masters, which drew 25,000 people to their event at the time. While the Alberta Old Tyme Fiddlers Association didn't think they'd get anywhere near that number, St. Germain joked that he hoped they "haven't unleased a monster" as interest grew amongst North American fiddlers. The first contest also included a guest appearance by Graham Townsend, and saw fiddlers from across North America compete. The contest offered a $8,000 prize pool and trophies, with about 150 contestants expected at the event. Over the two days, they filled their venue to capacity with about 5000 audience members total. The two-day event also helped to bring a network of fiddlers and styles together, and helped to promote traditional fiddle tunes.

=== Change of organizers and hardships ===
After the passing of Art Vollrath, Alberta Old Tyme Fiddlers' Association dissolved. The Wild Rose Old Tyme Fiddlers Association then became the main organizers of the contest. Over the years, the contest has been held in Wabamun, St. Albert, Fort Edmonton Park, Sherwood Park, Leduc, Radway, and Fort Saskatchewan.

In 1988, the contest was held in St. Albert, where they estimated 50 fiddlers came from across Western Canada to compete. The audience turnout was disappointing, with fewer than 1500 total spectators over the weekend, worrying organizers that the contest wasn't sustainable. Financial hardship in the late 1980s and early 1990s, especially due to the recession and low turnout, meant the cancellation of the event for a few years. However, a partnership with the Edmonton Exhibition – later Klondike/K-Days – helped to get the contest running again.

The contest has grown since then, attracting sponsorship from the Government of Canada, local municipalities, and various fiddling associations. They had contestants ages ranging from 6 to 101, with several winners going on to become Canadian Grand Masters, including Patti Kusturok, Ethan Harty, James Steele, and Paul Lemelin. Their guest artists have included Graham Townsend, Al Cherney, Frankie Rogers, and former champions Alfie Myhre and Calvin Vollrath.

=== Recent years ===
The current contest is a four-day festival. It includes jam sessions, an old time barn dance, youth camp, the fiddle contest, a concert, and an afterparty. Although the contest went online in 2020 and 2021 due to the pandemic, it started back in-person in 2022. Before this switch, the contest saw about 45-60 competitors at the annual championship. The 2024 iteration of the contest includes over $16,000 worth of prizes, including a $1,500 prize for the championship winner, and $1,500 sponsorship for the top three Albertan fiddlers who choose to attend Grand Masters (split between them). It is one of the largest prize pools in North America for fiddling. Organizer Frank Grell noted that the Grand North American championship is “a fiddle celebration with something for everyone whether they are a musician, dancer or spectator.”

== Format ==
=== Classes ===
Contestants that win the same class two years in a row must move onto a more advanced class or skip the competition for one year. Classes include (in order of level): Novice, Junior Junior (9 & Under), Junior (14 & Under), Youth (18 & Under), Intermediate, Advanced, and Championship. There are also Golden (70 & over) and Senior (55 & older) classes that can advance to the Advanced and Championship classes. Contestants can enter any of one of these classes along with any number of specialty classes which include: twin fiddle, traditional, and novelty. Those in the championship class also have a preliminary round.

=== Judging ===
Contestants are asked to play a selection of tunes in front of a panel of judges. The judges base their scores for each contestant on intonation, timing, danceability, and style. The order of contestants is chosen by random draw.

=== Tunes and play ===
The tunes must all be old time style, with the exception of the tune of choice for the championship classes and the specialty classes. Contestants are allowed one accompanist (either one they brought or the house accompanist). Classes where contestants play 1-3 tunes have 4 minutes to finish, while the championship finals, due to the addition of a tune of choice, are allowed to play for five minutes. While Novice, Junior Junior, Traditional, Twin fiddle and Novelty classes play 1-2 songs, all others must play, in order, a waltz, jig, and reel (includes hornpipes and hoedowns).

For the championship class, finalists need to play different songs for the preliminaries and finals. In the finals, the tune of choice can be of any acceptable Canadian style: country, old time, Cape Breton, Swing, Métis, Bluegrass, French Canadian, Ukrainian, etc.

== Winners ==
=== Championship ===
The winner of the championship class becomes the Grand North American Champion. The youngest contestant to win was Eric Provencher at 17 years old in 2009. Previously, the record was held by Tyler Vollrath, who won in 1993 at the age of 19.

Blank spots and missing years indicate missing or incomplete data, or years where an award/position was not awarded. The championship also did not run for three years in the 1980s/90s.

In addition to the results below, Patti Kusturok has won the championship three times, while Bruce Blair, James Desautels, and Shane Cook have won once.

Grand North American Champions, 1981-2004
Year	Champion
1984	Alfie Myhre
1985	Calvin Vollrath
1986	Alfie Myhre
1988	Patti Kusturok
1993	Tyler Vollrath
1995	Dan Stacey
1996	Dan Stacey
1997	Dan Stacey
1998	Calvin Vollrath
2000	Ivonne Hernandez
2001	Ivonne Hernandez
2002	Tyler Vollrath

Grand North American Champions, 2005-present
Year	Champion	2nd	3rd	4th	5th	6th
2005	Sean Softly	Daniel Gervais	Ivonne Hernandez			
2006	Ivonne Hernandez	Rebecca Smith	Karrnnel Sawitsky	John Calverley	Catherine Robertson	Jarred Albright
2007	Ivonne Hernandez	Kerrnnel Sawitsky	Paul Brooks	Ben Plotnick	Sarah Tradewell	Allison Norris
2008	James Steele	Trent Freeman	Troy Gates	Don L'Hirondell		
2009	Eric Provencher	Ivonne Hernandez	Ben Plotnick	Trent Freeman	Alex Kusturok	James Steele
2010	James Steele	Ben Plotnick	Alex Kusturok	Braden Gates	Billie-Jo Smith	Jarred Albright
2011	James Steele	Matthew Contois	Braden Gates	Billie-Jo Smith	Sarah Tradewell	Alex Randall
2012	Matthew Contois	Ben Plotnick	Jane Cory	Braden Gates	Roxanne Young	Jarred Albright
2013	Alex Kusturok	Ben Plotnick	Micki-Lee Smith	Jane Cory	Braden Gates	Sean Softly
2014	James Steele	Ben Plotnick	Greg Henry	Adam Johnson	Micki-Lee Smith	Kai Gronberg
2015	James Steele	Jane Cory	Micki-Lee Smith	Lia Gronberg	Ashley Giles	Chloe Davidson
2016	Raymond Knorr				Kai Gronberg	
2017	James Steele	Raymond Knorr	Alex Kusturok	Kai Gronberg	Ethan Harty	Lia Gronberg
2018	Eric Provencher	Alex Kusturok	Ethan Harty	Lia Gronberg	Kai Gronberg	
2019	Ethan Harty	Kai Gronberg	Raymond Knorr	Colten Bear	Jackson Corry	
2020	Paul Lemelin	Jane Cory	Andrew Wilson	Germain Leduc	Raymond Knorr	
2021	Kyle Burghout	Jane Cory	Arthur Coates	Caroline McCaskey	Laura Wallbank	
2022	Raymond Knorr	Braden Gates	Eric Provencher	Kai Gronberg		
2023	Eric Provencher	Ethan Harty	Michael Burnyeat	Anna Smilek	Ben Christiani	
2024	Ethan Harty	Eric Provencher	Anna Smilek	Kai Gronberg	Michael Burnyeat	
