= Gordon Stobbe =

Canadian fiddler

- Occupation: Musician
- Known for: Fiddle
- Honours: Canadian Grand Masters Lifetime Achievement Award, Inductee in the North American Fiddlers Hall of Fame
- Website: https://www.fiddlebooks.com, https://www.twinfiddles.ca

Gordon Stobbe (/ˈstoʊbi/ STOH-bee; born 1945–46) C.M is a Canadian fiddler, multi-instrumentalist, and composer based in Seaforth, Nova Scotia. Stobbe was born in Saskatchewan, but has made his home on the East Coast of Canada since 1977. His musical interests and passion lie in the field of Canadian traditional music, especially as it is expressed in a wide variety of fiddle styles. He plays several instruments, including fiddle, mandolin, guitar, clawhammer banjo, piano, accordion and percussion.

== Performance history ==
=== Musical groups ===
Throughout his performance career, Stobbe has performed with a variety of bands, including the Dixie Flyers in Ontario, and in Nova Scotia: the Ladies Choice Bluegrass Band (the first full time Bluegrass Band in Nova Scotia), Those Fabulous Clichés, the Mighty Oak String Band, Razzmatazz for Kids, the John Gracie Band, Bowties with Duo Concertente and the Gordon Stobbe Trio. Stobbe has also performed as a sideman for artists touring the Maritimes, including Cindy Church, from Bible Hill (Nova Scotia) and many others. Stobbe has also been part of many recording projects for a wide variety of artists across Canada.

Stobbe performed at Fiddles of the World (1999) in Halifax, Nova Scotia, the 2003 East Coast Music Awards Roots Room Concert, and the 2006 Juno Awards After Hours Concert. He has also performed at numerous concert halls and music festivals across Canada, including: the Winnipeg Folk Festival (Manitoba), the Ottawa Folk Festival (Ontario), Mariposa Folk Festival (Ontario), the Home County Folk Festival (London, Ontario), Carlisle Bluegrass Festival (Ontario), The Downeast Bluegrass and Old-Time Music Festival (Nova Scotia), the Lunenburg Folk Harbour Festival (Nova Scotia), Festival By The Sea (New Brunswick), the Miramichi Folk Festival (New Brunswick), and many Maritime Bluegrass Festivals. Gordon continues to work in a variety of musical configurations across Canada.

Stobbe's music is mentioned in the Fiddling section of the Canadian Encyclopedia.

=== Television, radio and film ===
In the 1980s, Stobbe co-created, hosted, and musical directed eight seasons of a traditional music television variety program on the ATV / CTV Network, called Up Home Tonight in Halifax, Nova Scotia. This show was created at ATV and appeared across Canada on the CTV network. Before each season, Gordon and the producer would travel to numerous small towns throughout all three Maritime provinces, auditioning acts for the show. This Talent Search each year not only discovered new artists but also became a goal for many local musicians, singers and dancers to have a chance to perform. Up Home Tonight showcased many well-known performers before they began their professional careers, including Natalie MacMaster, Ashley MacIsaac, the Rankin Family, the Barra McNeils, Lennie Gallant, J.P. Cormier and others. The show also featured some American touring acts, including Mac Wiseman, Ralph Stanley, Kenny Baker and Josh Graves and the Bluegrass Cardinals. The format for this show became the basis for the many ‘Kitchen Party’ type shows that have appeared in years since.

Stobbe also hosted, for twelve years, a weekly Bluegrass radio show "Bluegrass Express" on CHFX in Halifax, Nova Scotia. He supported many local bands and performers, showcasing their music and playing their recordings. A forum for supporting and promoting live shows for Maritime musicians was provided through this TV program.

He has made many radio and television appearances across Canada, including CTV's The Ronnie Prophet Show in Toronto.

Stobbe has also worked extensively in radio, theatre, and in other performing arts, often commissioned to compose music for CBC Radio, and other radio and film projects. Gordon performed and acted in the Nova Scotia / Hollywood film, ‘A Christmas Wedding’. He has also been a musical coach for actors in Hollywood-produced movies shot in Nova Scotia.

=== Music composer and author ===
Stobbe is a composer and author with many recording and publishing projects to his credit. He has recorded and produced twelve CDs as a solo artist. He has also composed music with his many bands through the years. Stobbe has performed on numerous other artists’ recordings across Canada. He has co-written fiddle music with Canadian fiddlers Calvin Vollrath, John Arcand, Patti Kusturok, Oliver Schroer, Shamma Sabir, Bernie Jaffe, J.J. Guy and many others. Stobbe's CD, "Small World", was nominated for "Best Roots / Traditional Solo Artist" at the 2003 East Coast Music Awards.

Stobbe has authored and published twenty seven fiddle books to date. These include fiddle instruction books and tune collections of traditional as well as original fiddle music. He has also produced one instructional DVD. His music and teaching materials, CDs and DVD are being used by fiddle teachers across Canada and the United States.

Stobbe has been commissioned to compose and record scores for CBC Halifax radio dramas, as well as musical work with other film and television projects. While working with the NDWT Theatre Company in Ontario, he composed music for their productions. He has been a regular contributor since 1999 to Fiddler Magazine, published quarterly in Los Altos, California. For many years, Stobbe has written over 55 articles featuring many Canadian fiddlers, presenting Canadian fiddle music to the world.

Stobbe also developed a two-hour stage show titled "The Fiddler's History of Canada", which traces the spread of fiddle music through the history of Canada. Mr. Stobbe first produced this show with a fiddle group in Smithers, B.C., who performed the show in the spring and summer of 2012. Mr. Stobbe has been working with other youth fiddle groups across Canada who are performing this show and other co-creations.

=== Theatre ===
Stobbe performed and toured across Canada and throughout the Canadian North for five years with the NDWT company, a theatre company based in Toronto, specializing in developing and performing Canadian theatre pieces. The company toured across Canada featuring James Reaney's ‘The Donnellys Parts I, II and III’. Stobbe appeared in the three volumes of these plays published by Press Porcepic. With this company, Stobbe also travelled to northern Ontario and the Northwest Territories performing with actors Gary Farmer and Graham Greene, among others. The NDWT Company is mentioned in the Canadian Encyclopedia.

Stobbe also performed with a Children's Theatre group in Montreal during the 1976 Olympics and has performed at Halifax's Neptune Theatre in the productions "Foxfire" and "Fiddler on the Roof."

=== Educator and mentor ===
Stobbe developed a teaching program at the inception of Musicstop's Canadian Conservatory of Music in Halifax, Nova Scotia, and continued to teach there for 30 years until 2014. Stobbe has also travelled to Canada's North to work with and mentor First Nations and Inuit children throughout Nunavut, the Yukon, Northern Manitoba and the Northwest Territories. He has done this work with a mandate to fill a cultural and sociological need for youth in the remote communities of Canada's North. Stobbe has stated that music is important in communities where there are few programs, if any, to inspire and occupy youth. In the Northwest Territories, Stobbe has worked with the Kole Crook Fiddling Association, which promotes fiddling in remote Northern communities; in Northern Manitoba through the Frontier School Division; and in Nunavut with the Tusarnaarniq Sivumut Association of Nova Scotia, which was featured in the Canadian North Airlines Infight Magazine 2011 for their outstanding work in bringing fiddle music to Inuit children throughout Nunavut.

Stobbe has been an invited judge and Master of Ceremonies at the Canadian Grand Masters Fiddle Competition, as well as adjudicating at the Nova Scotia Kiwanis and other festivals. He is also interested in the connection between traditional instrumental music and dance. Stobbe also calls square dances.

=== Present musical activities ===
He has travelled extensively across Canada teaching at fiddle workshops, music camps, and performing with various musical groups. He has either judged or been master of ceremonies at many fiddle contests across Canada, including the Maritime Fiddle Festival and the Canadian Grand Masters.

More recently, he often goes on tour as half of Twin Fiddles, a duo with Saskatchewan fiddler J.J. Guy. They work together throughout the Canadian West and North teaching workshops, mentoring youth, performing and composing. They have also released several albums together.

== Awards ==
In 2009, Stobbe was presented with the Lifetime Achievement Award from the Canadian Grand Masters Fiddling Association for his many contributions to Canadian fiddle music as a teacher, promoter, recording artist and composer.

In 2017, he was awarded the Order of Canada by Governor General Julie Payette for his "commitment to the preservation of fiddle music as a performer, composer and teacher."

== Original discography ==
- New Traditions - CD Transcriptions book
- The Mighty Oak Stringband
- Small World - CD Transcriptions book
- Seaforth Waltz - CD Transcriptions book
- Almost Home - CD Transcriptions book
- Solo - CD
- Borderline - CD Transcriptions book
- Canadian Old-Time Fiddle Hits Volume 1
- Canadian Old-Time Fiddle Hits Volume 2
- Canadian Old-Time Fiddle Hits Volume 3
- Twin Fiddles - CD Transcriptions book
- Twin Fiddles 2 - CD Transcriptions book
- Twin Fiddles 3 - CD Transcriptions book
- Twin Fiddles 4 - CD Transcriptions book
- Twin Fiddles 5 - CD Transcriptions book

== Fiddle hits collections ==
- Canadian Old Time Fiddle Hits—Vol. 1, w/CD
- Canadian Old Time Fiddle Hits—Vol. 2, w/CD
- Canadian Old Time Fiddle Hits—Vol. 3, w/CD
- Opening Lines (first line from all tunes Hits Vol 1, 2 & 3)
- Saskatchewan Fiddle Jam Tunes

== Music method books ==
- Of Course You Can Play the Fiddle: A Beginner's Guide, w/CD
- Of Course You Can Play the Fiddle Book 2, w/CD
- Of Course You Can Play the Fiddle Book 3, w/CD
- Of Course You Can Learn to Read Music for the Fiddle
- Of Course You Can Play Fiddle Harmony Vol.1, w/CD
- Of Course You Can Play Fiddle Harmony Vol.2, w/CD
- The Fiddler's Red Book of Scales & Arpeggios, w/CD
- The Fiddler's Green Book of Accompaniment, w/CD
- Mandolin Chordology, w/CD
- New Traditions Presents Waltzes, w/CD
- An Old Time Dance Calling Workshop, w/CD

== Educational DVDs ==
- Twelve Things Your Right Hand Should Know - Instructional Workshop
- The Fiddler's History of Canada - Two hour Live Performance with Valley Youth Fiddlers

== Awards ==
- Canadian National Bluegrass Award for Bluegrass Disc Jockey of the Year, 1987
- Curtis Hicks Memorial Award of New Brunswick for Contribution to the Preservation of Old-Time Fiddling, 1988
- Certificate of Appreciation from the New Brunswick Country Music Hall of Fame, 1988
- Lifetime Member of Downeast Bluegrass and Old-Time Music Society for Unselfsh Dedication to the Preservation of Bluegrass and Old Time Music, 1991
- Award for 10+ Years of Bluegrass Music from the Down East Bluegrass and Old-Time Music Society for many years of Promotion of Bluegrass and Old Time Music, 1991
- Lifetime Member / Friend of the Festival from the Lunenburg Folk Harbour Society for the Gift of Artistry, Hard Work and Friendship, 2002
- Nominated for Best Roots / Traditional Solo Artist at the 2003 East Coast Music Awards
- Award for Best Children's Recording for Razzmatazz at the 2003 East Coast Music Awards
- Letter of Appreciation from the Nova Scotia Legislature for Contributions to Music in Nova Scotia, 2004
- Lifetime Achievement Award from the Canadian Grand Masters Fiddling Association in Ottawa, ON for Outstanding Contribution to Old Time Fiddling in Canada, 2009
- Letter of Appreciation from The Tusarnaarniq Sivumut Association of Nova Scotia for work with music, programming and mentoring Inuit Youth throughout Nunavut, 2011
- Induction into the Nova Scotia Country Music Hall of Fame as a Pioneer and Honorary Member, 2014
- Certificate of Appreciation from the Province of Nova Scotia for Recognition of Stobbe's talent, achievements and remarkable contributions to Country Music, 2014
- Certificate of Recognition and Congratulations from Halifax Regional Council, 2014
- ECMA Stompin’ Tom Award, 2016, which “honours those who have made a long-term contribution to the East Coast music industry and have paved the road for many successful East Coast artist of today”
- Member of the Order of Canada for “his commitment to the preservation of fiddle music as a performer, composer and teacher”, 2018
- Induction into the North American Fiddlers Hall of Fame as “a North American-recognized fiddler who has risen above all others in their contributions to Old Tyme Fiddling”, 2019
