= Maritime Fiddle Festival =

Long-running Canadian traditional music festival

- Genre: Old-Time Music
- Dates: First Weekend of July
- Location: Dartmouth, Nova Scotia
- Years active: 77
- Founders: St. Thomas More Church
- Website: http://www.maritimefiddlefestival.ca

The Maritime Fiddle Festival is the longest running old-time fiddle contest in Canada. It is also the largest fiddle contest in the region.

Occurring annually in Nova Scotia in early July, the contest currently includes seven fiddling classes, two step-dance classes, and two days of competition, performance, and socials. Winners of the contest include several notable fiddlers, including Mari Black, April Verch, J.P. Cormier, Scott Woods, and Shane Cook.

== Context ==
The Maritime Fiddle Festival is an annual heritage music festival with the goal of preserving and celebrating traditional music. Nova Scotia in particular found itself with a variety of Canadian fiddle styles, namely Cape Breton style (largely Celtic in origin), 'Down East' (popularized by Don Messer, largely connected to old-time and Celtic styles), and Acadian. Old-time music, influenced by European settlers, became a staple in Maritime homes. Greg Marquis argued that old-time music in New Brunswick absorbed other styles and became the dominant style for English-speakers in the province. In Nova Scotia, old-time music also featured prominently at dances and country exhibitions. The 1926 Pictou Exhibition also included an old-time fiddle contest, asking competitors to play two strathspeys and two reels. Fiddle music became a part of the culture, especially for dances, and also helped to inspire local Maritime musicians and songwriters.

Early recordings played on the radio helped popularize fiddle music, including recordings of the Cornhuskers, Cottar's Saturday Night, and Don Messer and His Islanders. Other notable players recording at the time or in the following decades included Graham Townsend, Eleanor Townsend, Ned Landry, Ivan Hicks, Earl Mitton, and Cye Steele. Fiddler Keith Ross noted that growing up, families would gather around the radio just to listen to Messer's show. He noted that Messer's personality and his playing of familiar tunes helped grow his popularity across Canada.

As fiddling grew and became a form of entertainment on the radio, and later television, as did competitions. Contests offered entertainment, a networking event, and a way to spread traditional tunes. As noted by step-dancer and fiddler Sherry Anne Johnson, contests allowed musicians to understand the culture. There is also an intergenerational aspect to the contests the longer they last, with children and grandchildren of fiddlers competing as well. Johnson also mentions that contests showcase changes in fiddling overtime, and the influence of competition and push to advanced technique and playing leading to the refinement. While the Maritime Fiddle Festival is the longest-running in Canada, other long-running include the Canadian Open Old Time Fiddle Championship and Pembroke's contest, both in Ontario.

American old-time and country music also had an influence on Canadian fiddling. Throughout the 19th century, American songs seeped into Canadian repertories. While Canadians found ways to share their music through radio and television, American songs already became staples. As radio and television gained popularity, so did popular music coming up to Canada from the United States. This spread fear that American culture would overtake that of Canada, a primary factor explored by the 1949 Royal Commission on National Development in the Arts, Letters and Sciences. The same fear influenced a Canadian Broadcasting Corporation (CBC) film on the loss of traditional fiddle music in Cape Breton, Nova Scotia in 1972. The idea that traditional fiddling could be lost led to the creation of the Cape Breton Fiddle Association as a way to help promote and preserve the style and culture. The same reaction played into the creation of the Maritime Fiddle Festival.

== History ==
=== Origins ===
The festival started in 1950 as a fundraiser for a new church building for St. Thomas More in East Dartmouth, Nova Scotia. The initial organizing committee consisted of Ed Greenough, Father Ernest Sweeney, Charlie Lethbridge, Don Currie, Jack Brenton, John MacCormick, and George Meisner. The contest focused on Old Time Fiddle at a time when there was fear that traditional fiddle styles were to be replaced by more popular music styles (especially rock and roll). The Maritime Fiddle Festival's organizing committee, fueled by this fear, felt that old-time fiddling risked being forgotten by Nova Scotians. Their idea for a fiddle festival evolved from a simple fundraiser into a call to action to encourage and preserve traditional fiddling styles.

=== First festivals ===
The first Maritime Fiddle Festival, originally called the Old-time Fiddling and Step-dancing Contest, took place in the unfinished church building, supported by fiddlers and step-dancers enticed to compete by members of the organizing committee. The second festival gained a larger audience than the previous year. It was more than the organizers anticipated, and they opened the windows to the church to allow the overflow to hear from outside. The next year, they moved the event to the Dartmouth Memorial Rink and saw a crowd of over 1000. The contest remained in the rink for several years, along with one year spent at the Halifax Forum, and entertained crowds of over 3000, often selling out.

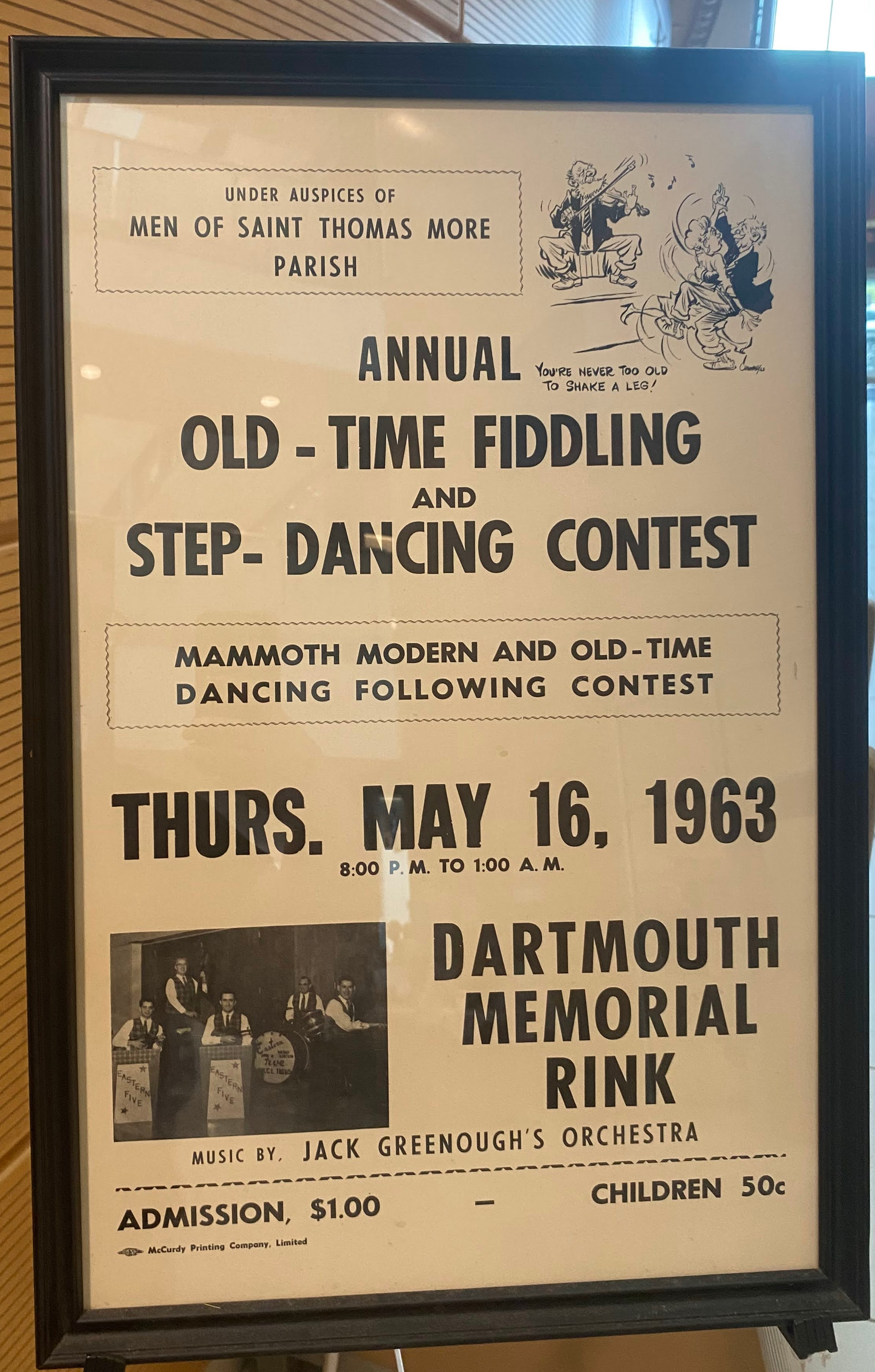
Poster of the 1963 contest on display at the 2024 Maritime Fiddle Festival

The festival introduced the first cash prize in 1956. Won by Ingonish fiddler Mike MacDougall, it also showcased the reach of festival into all corners of the Maritime region. The increase of ticket sales and competitors also meant the festival could pay star fiddlers to perform during the event. Over the years, their entertainment included Ned Landry, Earl Mitton, and Don Messer. By the mid-1960s, due to the popularity of the event and its long running time, organizers removed competitive step-dancing, leaving only the fiddling contests and officially naming it the Maritime Old-Time Fiddling Festival.

=== Expansion in the 1970s and 1980s ===
Starting with the festival's 25th anniversary, an 'Under 16' and 'Scottish Fiddling' classes were added, and the event was spread over two days. Due to the Dartmouth Memorial Rink burning down, organizers also moved the festival to Woodlawn High School (Nova Scotia). CBC broadcast the event, allowing it to reach new audiences. The festival further benefitted from the inclusion of fiddling and violin in the school curriculums, creating stronger musicians able to read and study music. By 1975, they expected over 50 fiddlers to compete.

By the 1980s, the festival grew to over 75 competitors from across Canada and the United States. Proceeds from the festival went to charity, as it has previous years. In 1980, their largest class was the Open Class, featuring returning champions. Organizer Jim Delaney noted that as the festival grew, "the high caliber of participants attract other outstanding fiddlers." The festival also added an Over 60 class, and created awards for best waltz, best jig, best strathspey, and best reel. In addition to a champion title for the Open Class, they also added a Maritime Champion for the highest ranking Maritimer (if the Open champion was not from the Maritimes), and also offered a trip to Shelburne, Ontario, for the Canadian Open Old Time Fiddle Championship.

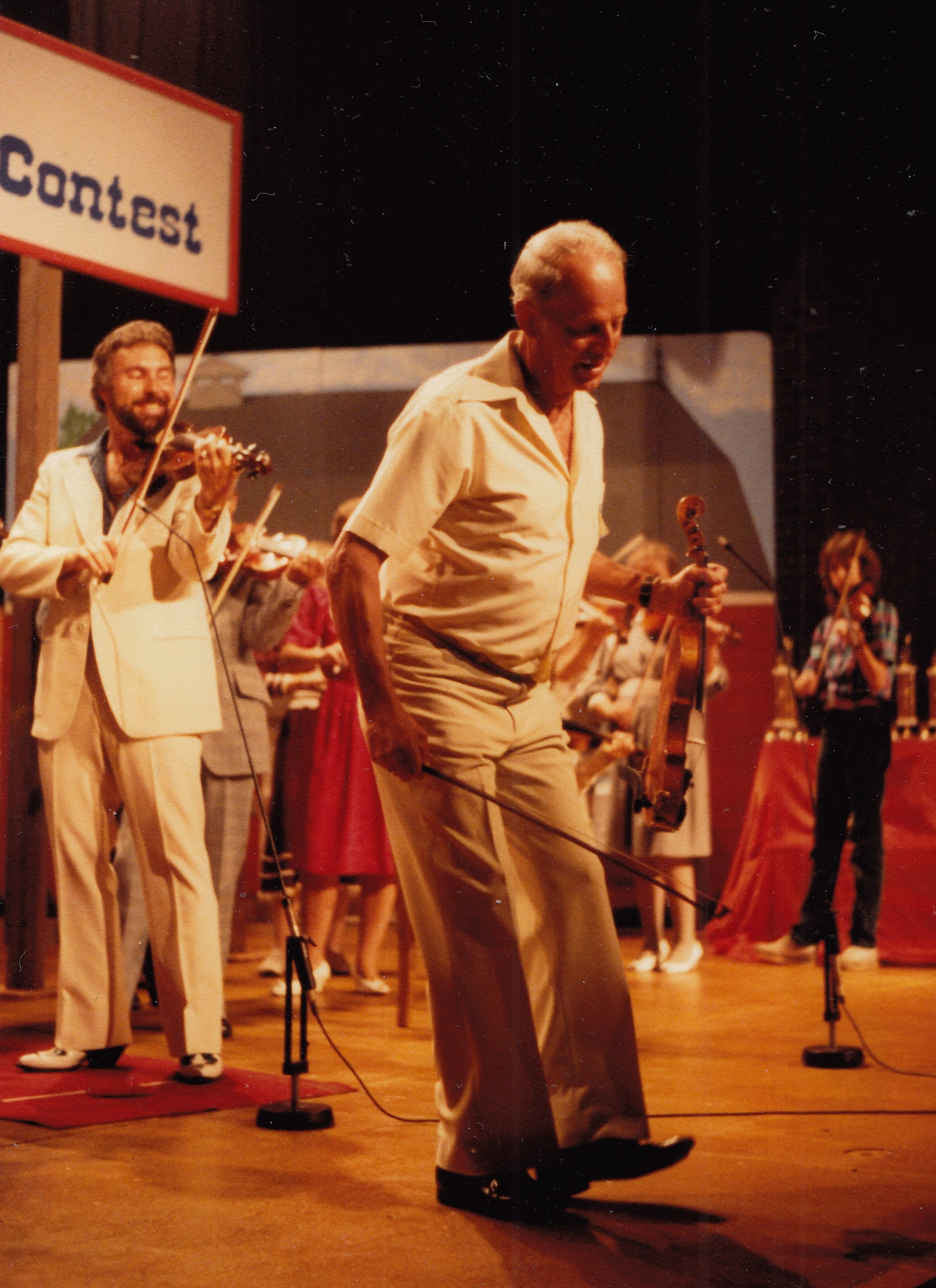
Graham Townsend (background) fiddling at the 1984 Maritime Fiddle Festival while a fiddler dances.

By 1985, the festival removed the Scottish Class, focusing instead on the old-time style. Their awards also expanded to include prizes for youngest and oldest fiddlers, and they added a fiddle mass and jamboree on Sunday. They also enjoyed entertainment from notable Canadian fiddler Graham Townsend.

=== Audience decline at turn of century ===
Leading up to the 50th anniversary, the festival moved in 1999 to the Dartmouth Sportsplex. While their attendance was significantly lower than previous years, they hoped that the move along with other fiddling events (including Fiddles of the World) would attract people to the festival. It also marked a shift in the organizing committee. Many of the church members retired, passing on the organizing to an independent committee. In 2001, they moved to the Ackerly Campus of the Nova Scotia Community College in Dartmouth. Their event expanded, including opening reception on Thursday night, preliminaries for most of the fiddle classes on Friday, and the finals and youngest fiddle class playing on Saturday, an ecumenical service and jamboree on Sunday, and a sendoff on Monday morning.

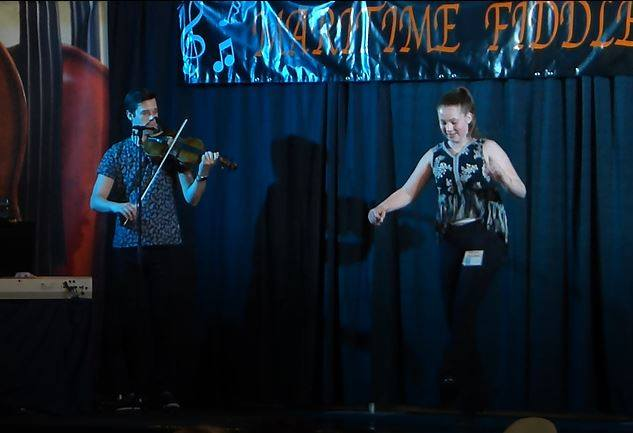
Step-dancer and fiddler at the Maritime Fiddle Festival

By 2002, they reintroduced the step-dancing classes, and in 2004 included workshops for fiddle and piano. That same year, the festival also auctioned a Don Messer fiddle. The fiddle, a gift from famed fiddler Graham Townsend, remained in the Messer family until put on consignment at Halifax's Folklore Centre. The final bid for $8,000 came from a New Brunswick fan, and managed to garner national attention from the Toronto Star.

In 2005, CBC decided to stop broadcasting the festival, a blow to their ability to reach larger audiences. After renovations at Woodlawn High School, the festival returned to its auditorium. Despite changes in audience sizes and venue, the festival saw an increase in competitors. In 2007, the festival expected over 1,000 fiddlers and step-dancers to compete at their contest.

Due to the scope of the event changing over the past few years, the changed the name to Maritime Fiddle Festival, and in 2008 revealed a new logo and website. For the 60th anniversary of the event, Canadian fiddler Calvin Vollrath wrote "Maritime Fiddle Festival's 60th Anniversary Jig," featured on his 2009 album 50.

=== 2010s to present ===
The Festival benefitted from arts funding from the Government of Canada, receiving funds to help support the festival throughout the 2010s. The funding is meant to help support arts festivals, and allow the public to participate in heritage events.

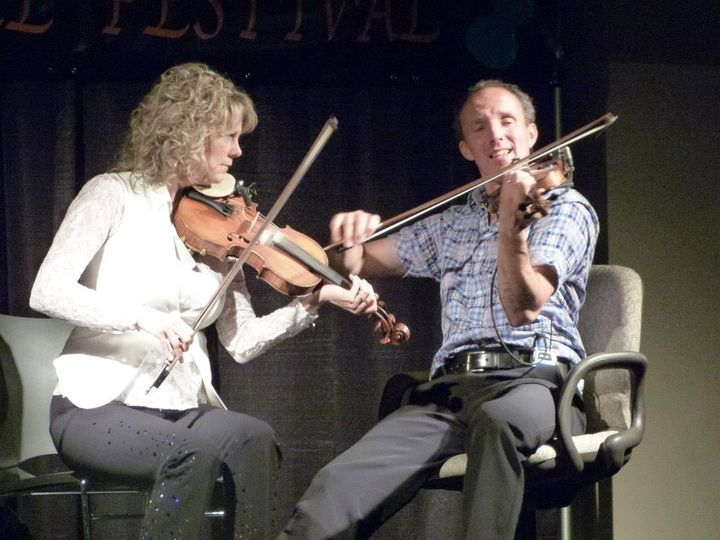
Natalie MacMaster and Donnell Leahy perform at the Maritime Fiddle Festival

In 2013, the festival moved to the East Dartmouth Community Centre. The festival has welcomed fiddlers to compete from across North America, and several star fiddlers to perform including Natalie MacMaster, Donnell Leahy, Gordon Stobbe, J.J. Guy, Ivan & Vivian Hicks, J.P. Cormier, and Shane Cook. Several of its competitors have gone on to compete at the Canadian Open Old Time Fiddle Championship in Shelburne, Ontario, and the Canadian Grand Masters.

The festival chose not to host an in-person contest from 2020-2022 due to the COVID-19 pandemic. Instead, they hosted an online concert in 2021, and an in-person concert in 2022. The festival returned in 2023 with a reduced in-person event at the NSCC Ivany Campus. The festival celebrated its 75th anniversary in 2024, and returned to the two-day format, with both fiddle and step dance classes.

== Format ==
Fiddle contestants are asked to play a waltz, jig, and reel (in that order) within 4 minutes, and all songs must be consider old-time. Judges then assign scores out of 100 based on the play (tone, technique, timing, and accuracy). With the exception of the two younger classes, which have four finalists and only compete once, all the fiddle classes will have three finalists chosen to compete again in the finals. There are seven fiddle classes: 9 & Under, 10-12, 13-18, 19-59, 60 & Over', Open, and Group.

Step-dancers are asked to dance a reel, played live with a time limit of 3 minutes. They are similarly judged on timing, but also on execution, variety of steps, and presentation. There are two step-dance classes: 15 & Under, and Open.

Winners perform in the Stars of the Festival contest, and receive a cash prize and a trophy or medallion. They are also restricted to three consecutive wins, and are unable to compete in the same group after the three wins the next year (count returns to 0 after the one year break). Besides winners chosen for each category, the Maritime Fiddle Festival also offers awards for the youngest and oldest fiddler, one each for the best waltz, jig, and reel, the Come on Back Award for a returning Atlantic Canadian age 18 & Under, Ted MacPherson Memorial Award for the most points achieved by a fiddler 8 & under, fiddlers' prize draws for all three 18 & under classes, the Don Messer Memorial Award for the fiddler with the highest points total at the contest, and the Tara Lynne Touesnard Memorial Award for a community member dedicated to the advancement of fiddling, chosen by the Maritime Fiddlers Association.

== Past winners ==
Winners are separated by class or award. Missing years are due to incomplete information or an award not being awarded that year.

Mi'kmaw fiddler Lee Cremo holds the record for most champion titles in the Open Class with six wins. As of 2025, only seven fiddlers have won consecutive years (back-to-back), with the most recent being Amelia Parker in 2024. Only four fiddlers have reached the current cutoff for consecutive open class wins in a row (three wins in three years): Cye Steele, Lee Cremo, Denis Lanctot, and Amelia Parker, with Parker being the most recent to do so from 2023-2025. Parker is also the only female and youngest fiddler to win the open three consecutive years.

=== Open Class ===
| Year(s) | Winner |
|---|---|
| 1950 | John Brown |
| 1958 | Roddie Dorman |
| 1959-1962 | Cye Steele |
| 1965 | Pat Curry |
| 1966-1968 | Lee Cremo |
| 1969 | Wilfred Prosper |
| 1970 | Cye Steele |
| 1973 | Carl Elliott |
| 1974 | Jack Greenough |
| 1975 | Carl Elliott |
| 1976-1977 | Lee Cremo |
| 1978 | Rick Cormier |
| 1979 | Ivan Hicks (Maritime Champion) & Rick Cormier (Open Champion) |
| 1980 | Ivan Hicks |
| 1981 | Bill Guest |
| 1982 | Winston Crawford |
| 1983 | Etienne Larocque |
| 1984 | Kelly Trottier |
| 1985 | Harold O'Donnell |
| 1986 | Malcolm Brogan |
| 1987-1989 | D. Lanctot |
| 1990-1991 | Tara Lynn Touesnard |
| 1992 | Rebecca Koehler |
| 1993 | Guy Paul Larocque |
| 1994 | Richard Wood |
| 1995 | Elmo Leblanc |
| 1996 | Rhonda Lanctot |
| 1997 | Leo Cormier |
| 1998 | Mark Sullivan |
| 1999 | Yvon Cuillerier |
| 2000 | Kellie Tanner |
| 2001 | Stacey Lynn Read |
| 2002-2003 | Terri Surette |
| 2004 | Samantha Robichaud |
| 2005 | Jacques Mainville |
| 2006 | Anthony Rissesco |
| 2007 | Yvon Cuillerier |
| 2008 | Katlyn Hustins |
| 2009 | Adrianna Ciccone |
| 2010 | Terri Surette |
| 2011 | Terri Croft |
| 2012 | Mari Black |
| 2013 | Greg Henry |
| 2014 | Mari Black |
| 2015 | Yvon Cuillerier |
| 2016 | Janelle Melanson |
| 2017 | Yvon Cuillerier |
| 2018 | Andrew Kent |
| 2019 | Yvon Cuillerier |
| 2023-2025 | Amelia Parker |
| 2026 | Ben Rutz |

=== Championship Class ===
This class only existed from 1992 to 1997.

| Year(s) | Winner |
|---|---|
| 1992 | Gretchen Koehler |
| 1993 | Jocelyn Bourque |
| 1994 | Gary Greene |
| 1995 | John Paul "J.P." Cormier |
| 1996 | Scott Woods |
| 1997 | Shane Cook |

=== Scottish Class ===
This class only existed from 1974 to 1980.

| Year(s) | Winner |
|---|---|
| 1974 | Albert Morris |
| 1975 | Maurice Muise |
| 1976 | Hugh Maclellan |
| 1977 | Albert Morris |
| 1978 | Albert Morris |
| 1980 | Nancy Roach |

=== Don Messer Trophy ===
Awarded to a Maritime fiddler with the highest points in the contest, in memory of Don Messer. Six fiddlers have won the award three times, tying for the record.

| Year(s) | Winner |
|---|---|
| 1986 | Malcolm Brogan |
| 1987 | Tara Lynn Touesnard |
| 1988 | Ian Mardon |
| 1989 | Malcolm Brogan |
| 1990 | Richard Wood |
| 1991-1992 | Tara Lynn Touesnard |
| 1993 | Jocelyn Bourque |
| 1994 | Richard Wood |
| 1995 | John Paul "J.P." Cormier |
| 1996 | Stacey Lynn Read |
| 1997 | Christopher Anstey |
| 1998 | Kellie Tanner |
| 1999 | Samantha Robichaud |
| 2000-2001 | Stacy Lynn Read |
| 2002 | Terri Surette |
| 2003 | Janelle Dupuis |
| 2004 | Samantha Robicaud |
| 2005 | Jacques Mainville |
| 2006 | Anthony Rissesco |
| 2007 | Terri Surette |
| 2008 | Rosanna Burrill |
| 2009 | Terri Surette |
| 2010 | Rosanna Burrill |
| 2011 | Terri Croft |
| 2012 | Rosanna Burrill |
| 2013 | Christine Melanson |
| 2014 | Janelle Melanson |
| 2015 | Guy Paul Laroque |
| 2016-2017 | Janelle Melanson |
| 2018-2019 | Andrew Kent |
| 2023-2025 | Amelia Parker |
| 2026 | Ben Rutz |

=== Tara Lynne Touesnard Award ===
Awarded in recognition of a community member who represents the qualities of Tara Lynne Touesnard and works towards the promotion of old-time fiddle. Winner chosen by the Maritime Fiddlers Association.

| Year(s) | Winner |
|---|---|
| 1995 | Ivan Hicks |
| 1996 | Jim Delaney |
| 1997 | Keith Ross |
| 1998 | Lee Lowerison |
| 1999 | Ron Noiles |
| 2000 | Ernest Despres |
| 2001 | Lorimer Higgins |
| 2002 | Jocelyne Bourque |
| 2003 | Kimberley Holmes |
| 2004 | Liz and Jamie Durning |
| 2005 | Garold Hanscom |
| 2006 | Jack Sibley |
| 2007 | Lloyd Tattrie |
| 2008 | Arthur Benedict |
| 2009 | Raylene and Marlene MacDonald |
| 2010 | Gordon Spears |
| 2011 | Al McVicar |
| 2012 | Doug Morash |
| 2013 | Helen Edgar |
| 2014 | Susie Eisan |
| 2015 | Krist Touesnard |
| 2016 | Ken Wood |
| 2017 | Mary Smith |
| 2018 | Susan Butler |
| 2019 | Normand Breau |
| 2023 | Sylvia Campbell |
| 2024 | Stacey Read |
