= Scott Woods (fiddler) =

Canadian fiddler

Scott Woods is a Canadian Grand Masters fiddling champion and band leader based in Ontario. He is known for his travelling variety fiddling show.

== Early life and education ==
Woods was born in Fergus, Ontario and grew up in Fergus and Courtice. He began learning to play violin at the age of four, and when he was growing up played in his family's band, along with his parents and three siblings. He began competing in fiddle contests when he was eight, and by 1984 he was an Ontario fiddle champion.

== Career ==
In the late 1980s, Woods took over the family band. He continued to compete in fiddle contests and won the Maritime Fiddle Festival Champion Class in 1996, and the Canadian Open Old Time Fiddle Championship in 1993 and 1996. Scott Woods also won the Canadian Grand Masters Fiddling Competition in 1998 and 1999, as well as finished in the top eleven finalists between 1992-2005, including twelve top three finishes over that period.

In 1998 Woods was hired to play the part of Don Messer in a series of tribute shows, "Memories of Don Messer Jubilee", after the series' co-founder and fiddler Graham Townsend died. He became music director, and continued to perform in this series for seven years.

By 2004, the family band had become the Scott Woods Band. In 2006, Woods and his band released an album of traditional fiddle music, Reflecting the Past, and another album Dancing Fiddles.

Woods organized a traveling show, in which he often performed with his sister, Kendra Woods-Norris. For many years the show has toured throughout Canada, staging more than 100 concerts each year. The show includes guest musicians, and sometimes members of Woods' family, performing traditional and modern fiddling from a variety of genres. During the shows Woods demonstrates "trick fiddling", including his well-known summersaulting and barrel rolling. Step dancers and other performers add to the variety. Each year's show is different.

In 2014, Woods once again MC'd a Don-Messer-themed tour across Canada.

As well as his regular tours, Scott organizes and performs in a series of Christmas fundraisers each fall for various charities and service organizations. As of 2017, about $2 million had been raised by the concerts.

In 2017, Woods was Master of Ceremonies at the 67th Canadian Old Time Fiddle Championships in Shelburne.

In 2018, The Canadian Grand Masters Fiddling Association also presented Scott Woods with the Lifetime Achievement Award for his contributions in composing, recording, teaching and recording of Canadian fiddle music as well as for his performances throughout Canada, the United States and Europe.
