= Bowfire =

Canadian music group

Bowfire is a Canadian musical group from Ontario, featuring multiple violins, led by violinist and composer Lenny Solomon. They perform an eclectic mix of classical music, jazz, bluegrass music, celtic music, rock music, and world music.

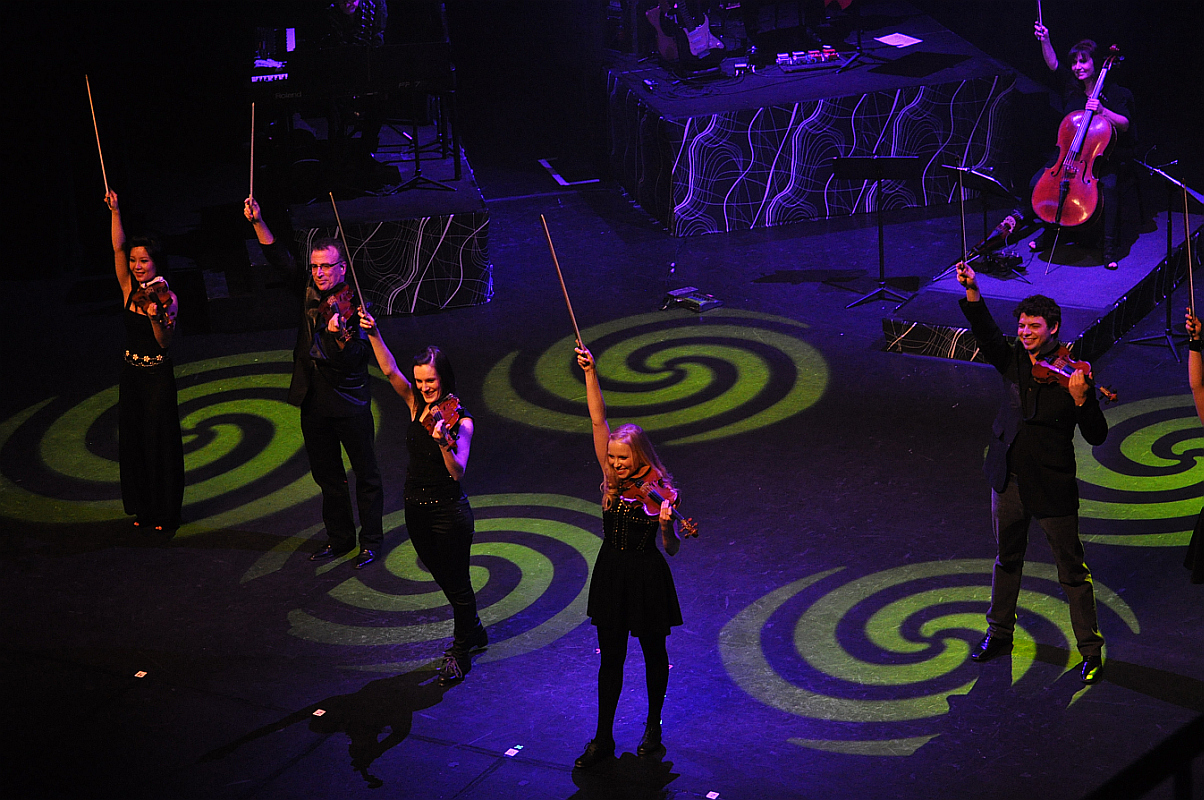
Bowfire

In addition to the group's nine violinists/fiddlers, Bowfire also features Toronto-based erhu performer George Gao. One of the group's popular compositions is "Fiddler in the Hood." They also perform covers of well-known tunes, including Led Zeppelin's "Kashmir."

== History ==
Bowfire was formed by Solomon in June 2000. The group gave its first performance the following month at Expo 2000 in Hannover, Germany, to a positive audience response. Bowfire was later invited to perform as part of the Governor-General's Awards show.

The ensemble gave a series of performances during the summer of 2001 in New York City, and embarked on a U.S. tour during the 2002–2003 season.

Bowfire's self-titled album was released in 2003. In December that year the group made its Asian debut with performances in Taiwan. In 2005, the band started a youth outreach program. Bowfire continued to tour internationally, and had about 100 North American performance dates scheduled for 2008.

Bowfire also filmed an HD concert special in conjunction with WLIW Public Television in New York, which aired on PBS stations throughout the United States. The ensemble continued to tour internationally until 2015.

== Members ==
- Lenny Solomon
- Stephane Allard
- Marc Djokic
- Stephanie Cadman
- Jon Pilatzke
- Yi-Jia Susanne Hou
- George Gao
- Shane Cook
- Bogdan Djukic
- Ray Legere
- Wendy Solomon
- Kelli Trottier
- Bernie Senensky
