= The Ronnie Prophet Show =

- Genre: Variety show
- Written by: Bill Lynn; Gerry O'Flanagan
- Presented by: Ronnie Prophet
- Country of origin: Canada
- Original language: English
- No. of seasons: 1
- No. of episodes: 11

Production
- Producer: Bill Lynn
- Running time: 60 minutes

Original release
- Network: CBC Television
- Release: 21 June – 6 September 1974

The Ronnie Prophet Show is a Canadian music variety show that aired on CBC Television in 1974.

== Premise ==
Ronnie Prophet, who hosted the 1973 Country Roads program, was featured in this mid-season replacement of The Tommy Hunter Show. Series regulars included The Dave Woods Brass, vocal trio The Peaches and actor Heath Lamberts. Bob Farrar was the program's musical director.

== Scheduling ==
This hour-long program was broadcast on Fridays at 9:00 p.m. (Eastern) from 21 June to 6 September 1974.
