= Lenny Solomon (Canadian musician) =

- Born: 1952 (age 73–74); Toronto, Ontario, Canada
- Genres: Jazz; pop; classical
- Occupations: Instrumentalist, composer
- Instrument: Violin
- Years active: 1969–present

Lenny Solomon (born 28 September 1952) is a Canadian jazz, pop, and classical violinist and composer. An active studio musician, he has performed on hundreds of recordings and soundtracks. He has also recorded two of his own jazz albums: After You've Gone and The Gershwin Sessions. He has appeared as a guest soloist with a number of orchestras, including the Toronto Symphony Orchestra and the Winnipeg Symphony Orchestra, and has served as concertmaster for a variety of theatrical entertainments. He was awarded The Jazz Report 's Violinist of the Year award three times.

Solomon was born in Toronto. He attended Vaughan Road Collegiate Institute alongside his also musically talented older sister Maribeth. His father, Stanley Solomon, was a principal violist with the Toronto Symphony Orchestra; Lenny studied under violinists Albert Pratz and Steven Staryk.

In 1969, Solomon co-founded the Canadian folk-pop music group Myles and Lenny together with Myles Cohen. Myles & Lenny performed and recorded during most of the 1970s, won the 1976 Juno Award for Breakthrough Group of the Year and then parted ways. In 1982, Solomon formed the pop string quintet Quintessence with guitarist Bill Bridges. They made a few recordings for Duke Street Records and toured throughout Canada during the 1980s.

During the 1990s, Solomon toured with the Lenny Solomon Trio, which was dedicated to jazz violin. In 1997, with violinist Moshe Hammer and pianist Bernie Senensky, he founded The Galaxy Trio, which blended classical and jazz styles and recorded one CD.

In 2000, Solomon established the chamber group Trio Norté, which released one album in 2002, and the violin ensemble Bowfire which made its debut performance at Expo 2000 in Hanover Germany. Bowfire was internationally successful and toured the world until 2015.

In 2015, Lenny enlisted Marc Ganetakos and longtime collaborator and bassist Shelly Berger to help write and perform on his new album, The Blues Violin.

As of 2019, Solomon was the music director of the Elton John tribute band Elton Rohn.
