= Canadian Open Old Time Fiddle Championship =

Canadian traditional music festival

Canadian Open Old Time Fiddle Festival
- Genre: Old-Time Music
- Dates: Early August
- Location: Shelburne, Ontario
- Years active: 69
- Founders: Rotary Club of Shelburne
- Website: https://shelburnefiddlecontestdotcom.wordpress.com/

The Canadian Open Old-Time Fiddling Championship is one of the most important fiddle festivals in Canada. Founded in 1951, the contest was held annually in early August in Shelburne, Ontario. In the 2010s, it also became part of the Heritage Music Festival. It was the second longest-running fiddle competition in the country (behind the Maritime Fiddle Festival in Nova Scotia), although the contest has not been held since 2019. Several of the top fiddlers in Ontario have won the contest, including Pierre Schryer, Louis Schryer, Graham Townsend, Eleanor Townsend, Frank Leahy, Julie Fitzgerald, Shane Cook, and Scott Woods.

== History ==
=== Origins ===
The Canadian Open Old-Time Fiddling Championship began as a fundraiser for the Rotary Club, with sponsorship from the club and the CBC. It came at a time when fiddle music was popular on the radio and the number of fiddlers in Ontario began to increase.

The idea for the contest came from Shelburne Royal Bank manager Cliff McIntosh, after he saw a fiddle contest in another province. It was proposed as a fundraiser for the Rotary Club to help fund their charity donations, with the club set to organize the event. There were doubts from Rotary members that a contest would work, considering the Rotary Club hoped that people would pay to hear fiddlers play and compete despite the music being free on the radio. There was also concern about finding enough fiddlers to compete, which led to volunteers driving around the region to promote the event and find fiddlers. As there were few contests of its kind before the 1950s, it was somewhat of a new idea for locals to consider fiddling as a competition. The committee also advertised through various newspapers and radio stations across the region, and had fiddlers spread the word of the contest.

Don Fairbairn, who hosted "Neighbourly News" on CBC, also got involved in the event, and was able to get the CBC to broadcast the contest. The involvement of the CBC helped grow the audience of the contest and its popularity. In 1973, the CBC also produced a documentary called "The Fiddles of Shelburne" about the event and its origins.

The first contest happened on August 11, 1951, aligning with an open slot in the CBC's broadcasting schedule. Held in the Shelbourne Arena, it had the initial competition round on Friday, with the finals on Saturday. Admission costs ranged from 35 cents to 1 dollar, depending on age and event. Contestants paid $2 to enter with proceeds going to charity. The fee that was discontinued in 1983. Organizers made about $1000 from the event (which is nearly $12,000 in 2024). They had 44 contestants in total, including local fiddlers Lome Donaldson, Charlie Dyer, Annie Webster, and Albert Mews. The first winner was Mel Lavigne, with the first song played "The Victory Breakdown."

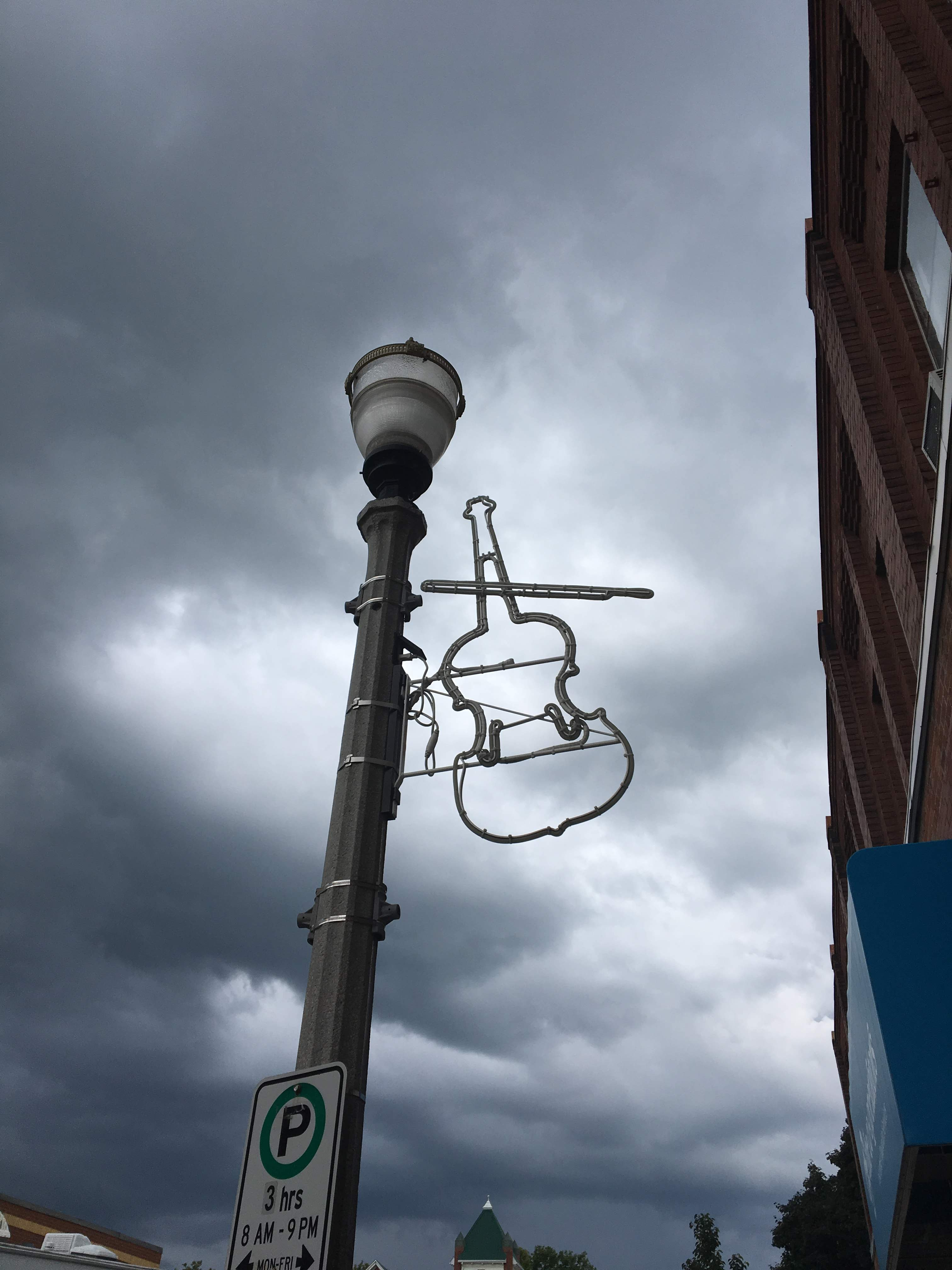
Fiddle decorations put up for the Canadian Open Old Time Fiddle Championship

The event became a massive success and brought thousands of visitors to the small town, with roughly 10,000 people in attendance between the players, organizers, volunteers, and audience. Discussing its impact, the Shelburne Free Press wrote "in a small community like Shelburne, everyone is affected to some degree by the Fiddle Contest, because so many of the town’s residents dedicate their time and efforts towards the event’s success...by 1951, the fiddle and fiddle music were traditions of Dufferin community life."

=== Growth ===
Following its success in the early years, the event grew past just the two-days of the contest. Over the years, the festival added a country jamboree, jam sessions, square dancing, concerts, step dancing, a parade, a Fiddle Queen pageant, street fairs, dinners, a BBQ and market, and a church service. The events span over a week, expanding the tourist traffic to the town. The popularity of the event also led to Shelburne being dubbed "Fiddleville." It also proved to be a major fundraiser for the Rotary Club. While it grossed about $1000 in 1951, the amount grew by 1972 to $20,000 (roughly $148,000 in 2024), with about three-times that amount being put into the community through accommodations, shopping, and food spending by visitors.

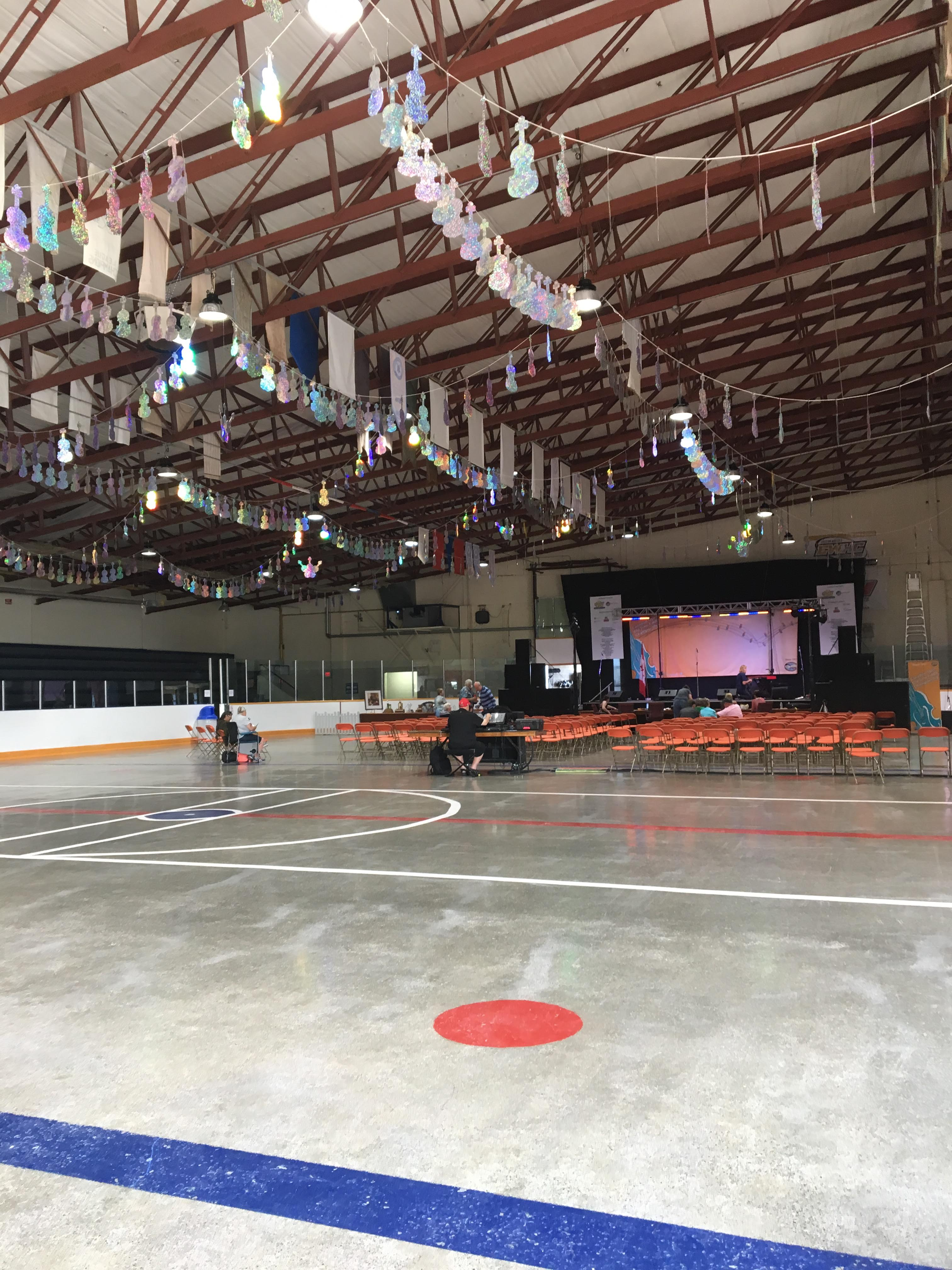
Event location for the championship in Shelburne

The earlier competitions held a jamboree while the judges decided on the winners. The contestants were recorded as they played, allowing the judges to listen again to their performances and decided together the top players. The judges now use headphones to listen to fiddlers, while remaining in an ‘open judging’ situation where they can watch the players on stage while listening through the audio equipment. Their "audience-attraction" played a part in their scores, acting as a performance/presentation criteria.

By the 1980s, the contest grew to hosting over 150 fiddlers and eight separate classes. The name of the event changed over the years, from the "Canadian Open Championship Old Time Fiddlers’ Contest," to "The National Fiddle Contest," and more recent returning to a version of the original as the "Canadian Open Old Time Fiddle Championship."

By 2004, the Canadian Open Old Time Fiddle Championship saw contestants from across Canada and the United States compete, becoming known as "the contest to enter." However, the Pembroke Fiddle & Step Dancing contest, along with the Canadian Grand Masters, have eclipsed the contest in terms of attracting a wider range of fiddlers across the country, especially due to their closeness in dates and being near Labour Day weekend. Yet, as argued by Sherry Johnson, the Canadian Open Old Time Fiddle Championship helped shaped these contests and their formats and became a vessel for "national exposure" for the contestants.

=== Decline of Old-Time Fiddlers and Reinvention ===
By the 2010s, the contest was primarily organized by the Rotary Club of Shelburne, with various local sponsors. In 2018, they merged with the Heritage Music Festival in a move to rejuvenate the festival. This came as growing concern over the perceived dwindling number of fiddlers in the region, despite a growth of young fiddlers in Toronto. At the same time, the championship saw fewer contestants than previous years. With the help of siblings Linsey and Tyler Beckett, and former champions Scott Woods and Louis Schryer, they helped to promote the contest and entice new fiddlers to sign up for the event. Another major issue impacting the survival of the festival came in 2020, with the cancellation of the contest due to the pandemic. Despite plans to reschedule for the next year, it was cancelled again. As of 2024, the contest has not been held since 2019.

== Format ==
Contestants are asked to play a waltz, jig, and reel/breakdown/hornpipe in that order. This was set as the main rule by organizers in accordance with contests in Western Canada. From 1951 to 1976, only one person, New Brunswick's Ned Landry, was disqualified for playing their tunes in the wrong order in 1959. All three songs must be performed in under four minutes unless otherwise specified for a specific class (championship/open class includes a Canadian tune of choice, for instance). The tunes played must belong to the Old Time fiddle style.

The contest consists of Championship/Open, Duet, Gospel, Novelty, Canadian Old Time Junior Championship (18 Years & Under), 19–55, 10–12, 9 Years & Under, 56 Years & Over classes (ten classes in total), along with prizes for Canadian tune of choice, youngest competitor, oldest contestant, best fiddler from Dufferin County, and most entertaining fiddler. Contestants are allowed to enter one individual class, the Novelty and Gospel classes, and one of either the duet or group classes. Judges award points based on time and tempo, tone, style and technique, and overall accuracy. Depending on the class, contestants play in the preliminaries before the top players are selected to play again in the finals where the winners will be chosen by the judges.

== Winners ==
=== Champion/Open Class ===
Winners of this class are considered the Canadian Open Champions. Louis Schryer holds the record for the most championship wins. Blank spaces below represent missing data or an award not given out that year.

Louis Schryer holds the record for most championship wins at eight, followed by Ed Gyurki (7).

Champions up to 1974
Year(s)	Champion
1951–52	Mel Lavigne
1953	Ward Allen
1954	Sleepy Marlin
1955	Victor Pasowisty
1956–57	Ned Landry
1958–59	Ed Gyurki
1960–61	Al Cherney
1962	Ned Landry
1963	Graham Townsend
1964–66	Johnny Mooring
1967	Ed Gyurki
1968–70	Graham Townsend
1971	Ed Gyurki
1972–73	Rudy Meeks
1974	Ed Gyurki

Champions and Runner Ups, 1975–2019
Year	Champion	1st Runner Up	2nd Runner Up	3rd Runner Up
1975	Rudy Meeks	Eleanor Townsend	Ed Gyurki	Alfie Myhre
1976	Ed Gyurki	Don Reed	Wilf Gillis	Rudy Meeks
1977	Rudy Meeks	Ed Gyurki	Eleanor Townsend	Don Reed
1978	Ed Gyurki	Eleanor Townsend	Raymond Schryer	Don Reed
1979	Eleanor Townsend	Don Reed	Dwight Lubiniecki	Alfie Myhre
1980	Don Reed	Robert Vallee	Dwight Lubiniecki	Frank Leahy
1981	Don Reed	Robert Vallee	Kevin Reger	Dwight Lubiniecki
1982	Don Reed	Raymond Schryer	Denis Lanctot	Chuck Joyce
1983	Chuck Joyce	Raymond Schryer	Robert Vallee	Alister Fraser
1984	Frank Leahy	Denis Lanctot	Raymond Schryer	Karen Reed
1985	Chuck Joyce	Pierre Schryer	Frank Leahy	Raymond Schryer
1986	Louis Schryer	Chuck Joyce	Raymond Schryer	Pierre Schyer
1987	Louis Schryer	Pierre Schryer	Chuck Joyce	Michelle Lubiniecki
1988	Pierre Schryer	Michelle Lubiniecki	Louis Schryer	Rob Dagenais
1989	Pierre Schryer	Louis Schryer	Raymond Schryer	Scott Woods
1990	Louis Schryer	Pierre Schryer	Anthony Rissesco	Chuck Joyce
1991	Louis Schryer	Michelle Lubiniecki	Pierre Schryer	
1992	Raymond Schryer	Louis Schryer	Scott Woods	
1993	Scott Woods	Louis Schryer	Rob Dagenais	
1994	Bob Dagenais	Crystal Plohman	Scott Woods	
1995	Louis Schryer	April Verch	Scott Woods	
1996	Scott Woods	Rob Dagenais	April Verch	
1997	Louis Schryer	Scott Woods	April Verch	
1998	April Verch	Scott Woods	Shane Cook	
1999	Louis Schryer	Scott Woods	Shane Cook	
2000	Louis Schryer	Scott Woods	Shane Cook	
2001	Shane Cook	Mark Sullivan	Scott Woods	Matthew Johnson
2002	Mark Sullivan	Shane Cook	Scott Woods	Chuck Joyce
2003	Shane Cook	Scott Woods	Mark Sullivan	Chuck Joyce
2004	Mark Sullivan	Shane Cook	Louis Schryer	Matthew Johnson
2005	Shane Cook	Mark Sullivan	Matthew Johnson	Chuck Joyce
2006	Mark Sullivan	Shane Cook	Matthew Johnson	Chuck Joyce
2007	Kyle Charron	Chuck Joyce	Greg Henry	Patrick Wieler
2008	Matthew Johnson	Kyle Charron	Patrick Wieler	Julie Fitzgerald
2009	Kyle Charron	Patrick Wieler	Eric Provencher	Julie Fitzgerald
2010	Julie Fitzgerald	Matthew Johnson	Kyle Charron	Greg Henry
2011	Kyle Charron	Tom Fitzgerald	Dan Mighton	Julie Fitzgerald
2012	Tom Fitzgerald	Julie Fitzgerald	Eric Provencher	Greg Henry
2013	Greg Henry	Kyle Charron	Julie Fitzgerald	Aynsley Prochak
2014	Kyle Charron	Greg Henry	Tom Fitzgerald	Terri Croft
2015	Kyle Charron	Greg Henry	Julie Fitzgerald	Terri Croft
2016	Greg Henry	Celine Murray		
2017	Celine Murray	Paul Lemlin	Emma March	
2018	Diana Dawdychak	Kyle Burghout	Emma March	Celine Murray
2019	Diana Dawydchak	Andrew Dawydchak	Emily Yarascavitch	Emma March

=== Ladies Class ===
The Ladies Class ran up to 1981.

Winners of the Ladies Class
Year	Winner	1st Runner Up	2nd Runner Up
1975	Victoria Hanson	Kathy Ferguson	Karen Campbell
1976	Karen Campbell	Karen Reed	Victoria Hanson
1977	Ellen Ruth Knapp	Kathy Ferguson	Karen Reed
1978	Shelley Mowat	Kendra Woods	Kathy Ferguson
1979	Karen Reed	Kathy Ferguson	Ellen Ruth Knapp
1980	Ellen Knapp	Karen Reed	Kathy Ferguson
1981	Kendra Woods	Karen Reed	Elizabeth Wood
