= Glory-Anne Carriere =

Canadian country singer

- Born: 1947 (age 78–79); Gravelbourg, Saskatchewan, Canada
- Origin: Canada
- Genres: Country music
- Occupation: Singer

Glory-Anne Carriere (born 1947) is a Canadian country singer, who received Juno Award nominations for Most Promising Female Vocalist at the Juno Awards of 1978 and Best Country Female Vocalist at the Juno Awards of 1980. She has recorded and performed both as a solo artist and as a duo with her husband, Ronnie Prophet.

Her singles as a solo artist included "Rocky Road", "Woman Alone", "Kelly Green", "In My Dreams", "Sugartime" and "Small Talk", while her singles as a duo with Prophet included "Storybook Children", "If This Is Love", "I'm Glad We're Bad at Something", "I'll Be There", "Lucky in Love" and "Two Hearts".
