= Shane Cook =

Canadian fiddler

- Occupation: Musician
- Known for: Fiddle
- Honours: Canadian Grand Masters Fiddle Champion, Canadian Open Fiddle Champion, U.S. National Old Time Fiddle Champion, Grand North American Champion
- Website: https://www.shanecook.com

Shane Ken Cook is a Canadian violinist. He is a long-time member of the celtic fusion ensemble Bowfire, and is a past Canadian Grand Master fiddler and U.S. National Fiddle Champion. His musical career has taken him to tour across Canada, the United States, Mexico, Germany, England, China, and Taiwan.

== Life ==
Cook was born in Dorchester, Ontario. He is the oldest son of Ken and Shirley Cook. Cook holds an Honours degree in music from the University of Western Ontario (now known as Western University) in London, Ontario. He and his wife Jillian have one son, Charlie.

== Career ==
Cook won the Championship Class at the Maritime Fiddle Festival in 1997. In 1999, he won the U.S. National Fiddle Championship in Weiser, Idaho, at the age of 17. He won the Canadian Open Old Time Fiddle Championship held in Shelburne, Ontario, in 2001, 2003 and 2005. As well as three Canadian Grand Masters championships in 2000, 2002 and 2003.

As a founding member, Cook toured for over 15 years with "Bowfire," a high-energy violin ensemble that combined string masters of classical, Celtic, bluegrass, jazz and rock violin. The group toured from June 2000 to the fall of 2015. Step dancing was also a feature with this performance troupe.

In 2008, Cook's album Where Here Meets There, with Nova Scotia fiddler and pianist Troy MacGillivray, was nominated for a Canadian Folk Music Award and won an East Coast Music Award (ECMAs) for Roots/Traditional Group Recording of the Year.

In 2013, Cook joined the Alison Lupton Band, an Ontario folk group.

In 2014, Cook released an album titled Head to Head with Ontario pianist, guitarist and Juno-winning member of the East Pointers, Jake Charron. The album was nominated for Group of the Year at the 2015 Canadian Folk Music Awards.

Since 2016, Cook has performed in a four member group called "The Woodchippers," a group with various musicians and step dancers who grew up in Ontario's traditional fiddle and step dance world. Joining Cook as The Woodchippers are:

- Joe Phillips (The Art of Time Ensemble) on double bass, guitar and vocals
- Emily Flack (Leahy) on piano, vocals and dance
- Kyle Waymouth (Five-time Canadian National Step Dance Champion) on guitar, tenor banjo, and dance.

In 2021, this group released an album, titled "Shane Cook and the Woodchippers: Be Here for a While."

Since 2018, Cook has played in the Claire Lynch Band, led by three-time Grammy nominee and International Bluegrass Music Association Female Vocalist of the Year, Claire Lynch.

== Discography ==
- Shane Cook – Cookin' on the Fiddle (1994)
- Shane Cook with Kyle Cook and James Bickle – Heritage Fiddles (1996)
- Sundry (2001)
- Shane Cook (self-titled – 2005)
- Shane Cook and Troy McGillivray – When Here Meets There (2008)
- Shane Cook and Jake Charron – Head to Head (2014)
- Shane Cook and The Woodchippers – Be Here for a While (2021)
