= Canadian Grand Masters =

Canadian music competition

- Genre: Traditional Fiddle Music
- Dates: Last Weekend of August
- Location: Canada (city varies)
- Years active: 34
- Founders: Canadian Grand Masters Fiddling Association
- Website: https://www.canadiangrandmasters.ca/

The Canadian Grand Masters is an annual event celebrating traditional fiddling in Canada. Considered "the pinnacle of Canadian fiddling," the core of the event is a concert/dance on Friday evening, followed by the competition the following day. Upwards of thirty contestants are selected to compete from across Canada, considered to be the top exceptional fiddlers from each province/territory. The winner of the contest earns the title of Canadian Grand Masters Fiddling Champion.

== History ==
=== Founding ===
The Canadian Grand Masters is hosted by the Canadian Grand Masters Fiddling Association (CGMFA), founded in 1989. Their mission is to support the preservation of traditional fiddle styles and recognize astounding Canadian fiddlers. In this effort, they elected to hold the first national championship the following year, originally known as the "Canadian Grand Masters Championship." For the first six years, the contest was held on Labour Day weekend before being changed in 1996 to the last weekend of August. The contest's purpose is to draw attention to and provide space for the traditional Canadian fiddling styles from across the country, while providing a space to showcase the country's top fiddlers. Aurora Fiddle Society member Teresa Watson noted that "it's also a chance to meet people who are significant in the fiddling world," adding that besides the space to perform, the contest is a major social networking event for Canadian fiddlers. According to the CGMFA rules, the recognized styles include: country, old time, Cape Breton, Swing, Métis, Bluegrass, and French-Canadian. Classical, jazz, blues, and similar non-traditional styles are not accepted.

=== The Event ===
The Canadian Grand Masters competition weekend in recent years consists of a dance/concert on Friday night, and the preliminaries, finals, a junior showcase, and Hall of Honour Inductees ceremony on Saturday. The preliminaries feature each contestant performing their set in a randomly selected order. At the end of this section, the top ten will be chosen to play again that evening in the finals before the winners are chosen from them. Up until 2020, a top eleven performed at the finals, but this has been changed to a top ten in recent years. Their first ever contestant was Keith Ross of New Minas, Nova Scotia.

Besides the finals, the Saturday evening's entertainment also includes a showcase performance from the judges and the Junior Showcase. The latter features a small selection of young fiddlers from across Canada, chosen by the CGMFA, who play their own tunes of choice in a non-competitive environment. Many of these performers go on to compete in the main contest in later years.

Saturday's events also include the introduction of new honourees to the Canadian Fiddle Hall of Honour. Started in 2022, CGMFA board members voted to combine their previous awards of recognition (Lifetime Achievement, Award of Merit, and Canadian Fiddle Legends Award) into a Hall of Honour. Five to seven recipients are chosen each year to be inducted into the Hall at the Canadian Grand Masters competition.

Canadian Fiddle Hall of Honour Inductees
Year	Inductees
1991	Roma McMillan
1993	Bob Ranger
1996	Ned Landry
1998	Graham Townsend
2001	Bruce Wilson
2002	Conrad Pelletier
2003	John Arcand
2004	Webb Acheson
2005	Calvin Vollrath
2006	Brian Hebert
2007	Ivan Hicks
2009	Gordon Stobbe
2010	Peter Dawson
2012	Louis Schryer
2013	Alfie Myhre
2014	Denis Lanctôt
2015	Winnie Chafe
2016	Roy Warhurst
2017	Yvon Cuillerier
2018	The Ottawa Valley Builders and Scott Woods
2019	British Columbia Old Time Fiddle Association and Daniel Lapp
2022	Frontier School Division, Patti Kusturok, Anne Lederman, Garry Lepine, Mel Bedard, and Larry Martineau
2023	Lloyd Bogle, Natalie MacMaster, Buddy MacMaster, Bill Guest, and the Maritime Fiddle Association/Maritime Fiddle Festival
2024	Old Crow Community, Colin Adjun, Angus Beaulieu, Joe Loutchan, and the Northern Youth Ensemble leaders

=== Impact of the event and CGMFA ===
By 2008, CGMFA became a national arts organization, showcasing its importance at a national level. Two years later, they achieved their charitable tax status. Canadian Fiddler Matthew Johnson also recognized the difference in atmosphere between the Canadian Grand Masters and other fiddle contests, noting the Grand Masters is more professional, with former president of CGMFA Bruce Cummings saying that the atmosphere is different largely due to its invitational nature, theatre venue, and structure. In its over thirty years, the Canadian Grand Masters established itself as the top-tier competition in the country. Several regional competitions and associations help sponsor their provincial representatives to ensure their best fiddlers are sent, including the Grand North American Old Time Fiddle Championship who award funds to their top three Albertan contestants. The event has become one of the highest honours to be invited to as a Canadian fiddler, with journalist Frank Peebles noting that "it's one of the hardest climbs in the Canadian fiddle world. Getting called to compete at the Grand Masters is a career watermark for any fiddler who gets their name on that coveted list."

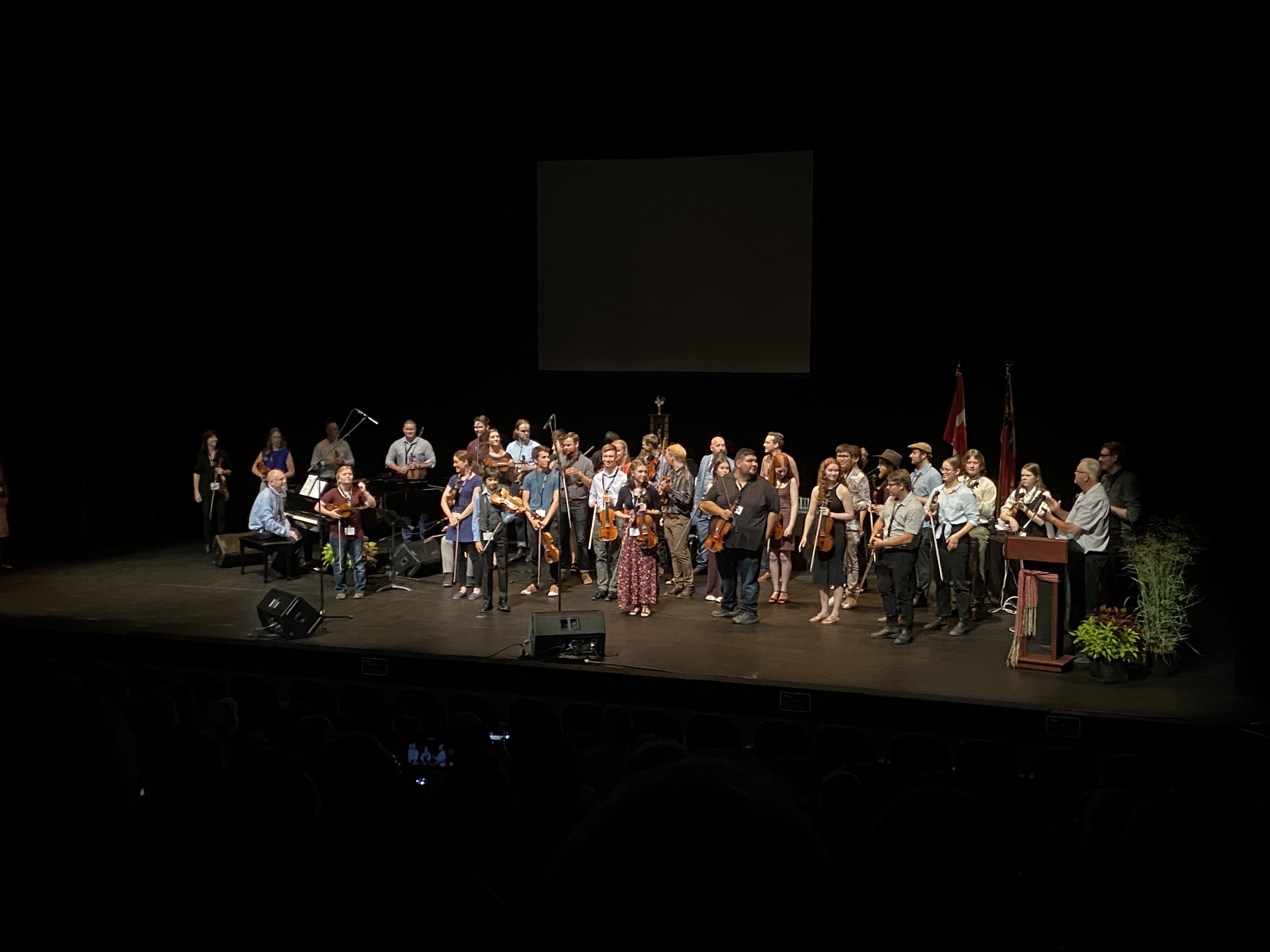
Canadian Grand Masters held at Winnipeg, with contestants lined up on the stage.

Besides the competition, the CGMFA also organizes workshops throughout the year, promotes National Fiddling Day events, and also launched The Canadian Fiddler newsletter in 1993. The newsletters feature events, news on fiddlers and fiddling in the country, interviews, results, tunes, and upcoming events.

Since its incorporation in 1990, over 900 contestants have competed at the Canadian Grand Masters (including those who have competed multiple times). As of 2025, the vast majority (183) are from Ontario. While there hasn't been a representative for Nunavut, Colin Adjun from Kugluktuk, Nunavut represented the Northwest Territories in 1991 before the forming of Nunavut as an official territory. The 2025 championship suffered from one of the lowest contestant turnouts in the event's history, with several former champions and top 10 finalists failing to return, and only a small representation of fiddlers from outside the host province of British Columbia.

Number of Provincial/Territorial Representatives (as of 2025)
Province/Territory	Number of Contestants
Newfoundland	10
Prince Edward Island	7
Nova Scotia	76
New Brunswick	87
Quebec	121
Ontario	183
Manitoba	128
Saskatchewan	117
Alberta	91
British Columbia	128
Northwest Territories	11
Yukon	6
Nunavut	0
Dual Citizens Outside of Canada	3

== Format ==
The championship consists of upwards of thirty contestants. This number depends on the amount of representatives chosen from each province/territory who are able to attend. Each contestant must be a Canadian citizen or permanent resident and be a member in good standing of the association. It is a closed championship, meaning that contestants must qualify according to the contest's eligibility criteria to compete. The contestants chosen by their respective provinces and territories are considered to be fiddling experts.

Prior to 2025, contestants were eligible for the annual competition by the following methods:

1. Invited by the CGMFA to be a provincial/territorial representative.
2. Finished in the Top 10 the previous year.
3. Past champion of any year since 1990.
4. At the decision of the board of directors.

Each province/territory is allowed to send up to five contestants each year, although the host province/territory can send seven.

As of 2025, the selection rules reduced the number of invitations based on performance, instead opting to include a mixture of top fiddlers and an audition process for the event, with an emphasis on the national board being the selection committee as opposed to provincial entities. Currently, fiddlers can be selected to compete based on the following criteria:

1. Finishing in the Top 5 in the previous three years (as opposed to the Top 10)
2. Prior winners of the competition
3. Competitors chosen by the board via video submissions
4. Persons deemed by the board as 'Iconic Canadian Fiddlers'
5. Players who competed at the previous year's competition

During the preliminary round, contestants play a waltz, jig, reel/breakdown/hornpipe, and a tune of choice (that is not a waltz, jig, or reel) in any order in under 5 minutes. Unlike the American National Oldtime Contest in Idaho which uses closed judging (having judges in a separate room to counter visual biases), the Grand Masters uses open judging where the judges sit on stage and listen to the contestants as they play with no additional audio equipment for aid. These three judges will then judge the contestants on intonation, technical ability, danceability, overall accuracy, emotion/feeling, and variety. The top ten from their marks will then proceed to the finals.

Those chosen for the finals must play a new set of a waltz, jig, reel, and tune of choice. In the event of a tie in the top three, those tied will play another set of three tunes in 4 minutes and be judged again.

== Diversity and representation ==
=== Gender ===
Although issues with diversity amongst the fiddle circuit go beyond the Canadian Grand Masters, research on the event highlights issues it faced with gender, especially in the 1990s.

Examining the culture of fiddling contests in Ontario in the early 2000s (which includes the Canadian Grand Masters, as it was held in Ottawa annually until 2013), Sherry Ann Johnson interviewed women fiddlers to understand if gender impacted competitions. Although Johnson notes that most did not experience any limitations based on gender, fiddler and judge Karen Reid said that there was a "definite old boy's school attitude" when it came to contests, with several comments made to her about being "good for a girl."

Johnson notes that since the 1970s, women fiddlers were often discouraged from competing in championships and open groups due to perceptions of gendered skill differences and a lack of role models. Women winning champion titles were often treated as unordinary and unexpected. In terms of the Canadian Grand Masters, Johnson also highlights instances where perceptions also influenced the judging. In 1997, one judge's top eleven were all women, and he was asked to change his marks. In the end, the top eleven that year were made up of ten men and one woman, April Verch. Verch won the championship, and also won the Canadian Open the following year. Verch noted several comments were made to discredit her wins because of her gender, such as "it's time for a woman to win, so that's why [you won] it." Johnson concludes with the belief that the stereotype of women being weaker fiddlers no longer exists.

The results of the Canadian Grand Masters show some changes in the statistics and gender divide that support Johnson's statement, although overall not much has change since the 1990s. As of 2025, out of the 380 contestants who have placed in the top eleven/ten, about 69 per cent (262) are men, while 31 per cent (117) are women. There are four years out of 34 where women made up the majority in the top eleven/ten (2001, 2002, 2006, and 2017), although there are eight years that only one or two women made the top eleven/ten (1997, 1998, 2008, 2023, and 2025 all had one woman in the finals, 2010, 2022, and 2024 had two). Looking at the top three contestants each year, out of the 105 contestants who placed in the top three, only 14 are women. Of the 35 winners, only six champion titles were won by women, with two women having won more than once. In the past three years (2023-2025), the divide has worsen with only 4 women placing in the top ten, meaning only 10 per cent of the finalists over three years are women, despite gender parity between overall contestants each year. While women have won the Canadian Grand Masters championship more often than at the Canadian Open, they are also statistically less likely to make the finals which is a rapidly worsening issue.

In her 2013 dissertation, Monique Giroux wrote that Patti Kusturok's wins, in particular, along with Crystal Plohman's second-place finish "gave girls and women public role models that early generations did not have: not only were they competing, they were winning big." Kusturok won the Canadian Grand Masters three times, the first Western Canadian to win, along with champion titles from the Grand North Americans and Pembroke.

=== Diversity ===
==== Styles and contestants ====
Besides gender, the Canadian Grand Masters has made steps to ensure cultural diversity and support a variety of fiddlers and styles from across Canada. Their contests recognize and accept a range of traditional fiddling, including Indigenous/Métis styles, and several top fiddlers and judges are Métis/Indigenous. The movement of the event each year across Canada between different cities also enables and attracts a wider range of fiddlers, and provides better access to the competition for those that would otherwise be unable to travel cross-country. In 2024, the Canadian Grand Masters will be held for the first time in Whitehorse, Yukon, again providing access to the contest for those that might not be able to travel, while also providing space for Northern fiddlers and fiddle styles to shine.

The 2024 Canadian Grand Masters in Whitehorse included a legacy project to help promote and preserve fiddling traditions in the North. This project highlighted and documented the history of Old Crow, Yukon, where fiddling and dances are common and led to their own distinct sound due to the community's isolated location. Several Yukon fiddlers emerged from the community, having learned fiddle tunes from the dances.

==== Judges ====
Originally the contest set out to have judges from three different regions adjudicate the contest. This helped to ensure that a variety of styles were represented at the adjudication level, as well as balance out unconscious biases towards the judges' preferred styles. The early contests had one judge each from the Eastern, Central, and Western regions of Canada. In this case, the regions are grouped by population, location, and similar fiddle styles. Eastern is considered Nova Scotia, Prince Edward Island, Newfoundland, and New Brunswick, Central as Ontario and Quebec, and Western as Manitoba, Saskatchewan, Alberta, and British Columbia.

Since 2010, there's been a decline in regional variety amongst the judges, with several years where two or more judges were from the same region and/or province. In 2010, for instance, two judges were from the Western provinces (Alberta and British Columbia) and one from the Eastern (New Brunswick), and in 2021, all three judges were from the Western provinces. There were also several judges asked to return consecutive years since 2010, with Calvin Vollrath judging 11 times, and Mark Sullivan and Louis Schryer both returning 7 times.

Regional Representation of Judges
Region	# of Judges from 1990-2009	2010-2025	Total
Eastern	20	5	25
Central	19	17	36
Western	21	23	44

Since 2010, there has also been an increase of Western fiddlers in the Top 3, and there has not been a Top 3 contestant representing the Central region since 2021. Paul Lemelin of Ontario was the last Central region fiddler to make the Top 3.

== Past winners ==
Winners of the Canadian Grand Masters contest become the Canadian Grand Master Champion. The contest also recognizes the first and second runner ups separately from the rest of the top 10/11 finalists.

Canadian Grand Masters
Year & Location	Champion	First Runner Up	Second Runner Up
1990 Ottawa	Pierre Schryer	Louis Schryer	Patti Kusturok
1991 Ottawa	Louis Schryer	Pierre Schryer	Calvin Vollrath
1992 Ottawa	Louis Schryer	Crystal Plohman	Scott Woods
1993 Ottawa	Louis Schryer	Calvin Vollrath	Rob Dagenais
1994 Ottawa	Patti Kusturok	Scott Woods	Yvon Cuillerier
1995 Ottawa	Patti Kusturok	Pierre Schryer	Scott Woods
1996 Ottawa	Patti Kusturok	April Verch	Scott Woods
1997 Ottawa	April Verch	Scott Woods	Bryon Myhre
1998 Ottawa	Scott Woods	Rob Dagenais	Yvon Cuillerier
1999 Ottawa	Scott Woods	Shane Cook	Mike Sanyshyn
2000 Ottawa	Shane Cook	Mark Sullivan	Scott Woods
2001 Ottawa	Mark Sullivan	Shane Cook	Scott Woods
2002 Ottawa	Shane Cook	Mark Sullivan	Scott Woods
2003 Ottawa	Shane Cook	Scott Woods	Mark Sullivan
2004 Ottawa	Mark Sullivan	Scott Woods	Matthew Johnson
2005 Ottawa	Mark Sullivan	Matthew Johnson	Chuck Joyce
2006 Ottawa	Chuck Joyce	Matthew Johnson	Trent Freeman
2007 Ottawa	Louis Schryer	Matthew Johnson	Chuck Joyce
2008 Ottawa	André Brunet	Matthew Johnson	Kyle Charron
2009 Ottawa	Julie Fitzgerald	André Brunet	Patrick Wieler
2010 Ottawa	Julie Fitzgerald	Kyle Charron	Eric Provencher
2011 Ottawa	Daniel Gervais	Julie Fitzgerald	Greg Henry
2012 Ottawa	Tom Fitzgerald	Greg Henry	Kyle Charron
2013 Saskatoon	James Steele	Ben Plotnick	Kyle Charron
2014 Ottawa	Paul Lemelin	Greg Henry	Kyle Charron
2015 Moncton	Greg Henry	Paul Lemelin	Dan Mighton
2016 Morinville	Daniel Gervais	Greg Henry	James Steele
2017 Valleyfield	Aynsley Porchak	Kyle Burghout	Dan Mighton
2018 Ottawa	Jane Cory	Ethan Harty	Kyle Burghout
2019 Abbotsford	Ethan Harty	Kyle Burghout	Jane Cory
2021 (Online)	Paul Lemelin	Kyle Burghout	Daniel Gervais
2022 Winnipeg	Ethan Harty	Kyle Burghout	Alex Kusturok
2023 Truro	Kyle Charron	Ethan Harty	Alex Kusturok
2024 Whitehorse	Ethan Harty	Kyle Charron	Max Francis
2025 Kamloops‡	Max Francis	Kyle Burghout	Jane Cory

‡The 2025 championship suffered from one of the event's lowest contestant turnouts. Despite this, they still held the competition but results are based on a contestant pool that is about half the size as previous years.

== Records ==
=== Overall Competition Records ===
Records emcompassing the overall competition that are of note based on number of times, updated for 2025.

Grand Masters Records of Note
Record	Holder	Amount	Notes
Most Wins	Louis Schryer	4 wins	Followed by Patti Kustruok, Shane Cook, Ethan Harty, and Mark Sullivan with 3 wins
Most Consecutive Wins	Louis Schryer and Patti Kustruok	3 wins	
Most time in Finals	Scott Woods and Paul Lemelin	13 times	Followed by Matthew Johnson with ten, and Greg Henry, Kyle Burghout, Kyle Charron, and Rob Dagenais with nine
Most times in Top 3	Scott Woods	12 times	Followed by Kyle Charron with seven and Kyle Burghout with six
Most appearances at contest	Danny Perrault	23 times	Followed by Anthony Rissesco and Paul Lemelin with 15, and Scott Woods with 14

=== Provincial and Territorial Records ===
Records based on each province, based on number of times someone represented their province/territory, updated for 2025.

Most Time Representing a Province/Territory
Record	Holder	Amount	Notes
Alberta	Braden Gates, Daniel Gervais, John Calverley and Ethan Harty	6	
British Columbia	Michael Burnyeat and Kai Gronberg	8	Followed by Mike Sanyshyn with 7
Manitoba	Jane Cory	13	Followed by Alex Kusturok with 10
Northwest Territories	Frank Cockney and Lee Mandeville	2	Followed by a five-way tie
New Brunswick	Jacques Mainville	9	Followed by Janelle Melanson with 8
Newfoundland	Christopher Antsey	5	Followed by Danette Eddy with 3
Nova Scotia	Anthony Rissesco	15	Followed by Kellie Tanner with 7
Ontario	Paul Lemelin	15	Followed by Scott Woods with 14
Prince Edward Island	Richard Wood	3	Five-way tie for second most
Quebec	Danny Perrault	23	Followed by Claude Jacob and Germaine Leduc with 9
Saskatchewan	Karnnel Sawitsky	12	Followed by Raymond Knorr and Kanndece Sawitsky with 8
Yukon	Kieran Poile	4	Followed by Jack Walcher-Wegmann with 2
