= Lee Cremo =

Canadian musician (1938–1999)

Lee Cremo (30 December 1938 – 10 October 1999) was a Mi'kmaq fiddler from Cape Breton Island, Canada.

== Early life ==
He was born on 30 December 1938 in Barra Head, Richmond County, Cape Breton Island. His family moved to Eskasoni, Cape Breton when he was four. Cremo learned fiddling from his father, Simon Peter Cremo, and Wilfred Prosper, and noted Prosper and Buddy MacMaster as an influences. He used to play all night with Prosper, learning tunes and passing on ones he learned to Prosper. His first fiddle was a hand-me-down from his great grandfather, who reportedly received it from a Scottish settler. Cremo had a lengthy career as a fiddler performing and recording around Canada. He also went to school for carpentry, and worked as a carpenter before becoming a full time fiddler. He was a member of the Eskasoni First Nation.

== Career ==
He primarily worked through the Cape Breton style of fiddle playing, performing many traditional pieces, but he also composed his own works including: 'Shubenacadie Reserve Reel,' 'Cactus Polka,' 'Irish Fiddler,' and 'Constitution Breakdown.' His music was recording as part of several Smithsonian Folkways recordings, including: Indigenous North American music, Creation's Journey (Smithsonian/Folkways SF 40410, 1994) and Wood That Sings: Indian Fiddle Music of the Americas (Smithsonian/Folkways 40472 1998).

In 1967, Cremo performed at Expo 67 in Montreal, Quebec.

In 1996, a short documentary called "Arm of Gold" was made about Cremo's trip to Tennessee to compete in the World Fiddling Championships.

In 1999, Cremo performed at the launch of the Aboriginal People's Television Network.

Cremo was also an active representative of the Cape Breton Mi'kmaq community. The Porcupine Awards for folk music offer the Lee Cremo Award for Native Artists. His tunes have been recorded by numerous contemporary fiddlers, including Sierra Noble and Ashley MacIsaac. Among Cremo's music students are renowned fiddlers Natalie McMaster and Ashley MacIsaac.

Cremo died on 10 October 1999.

== Awards ==
Cremo won numerous awards during his career. He won the Maritime Old Time Fiddling Championship six times, holding the record for most wins in the Open Class. By the mid-1990s, Cremo had won over 80 fiddling competitions.

- 1966-1968; 1976-1977: Maritime Old Time Fiddling Championship Open Class, Nova Scotia
- 1996: "Best First Nations recording," East Coast Music Awards
- Best Bow Arm in the World, World Fiddling Championships, Nashville, Tennessee
- Canadian Champion, Alberta Tar Sands Competition
