= Country Roads (TV program) =

1973 Canadian television program

- Genre: Country music
- Starring: Ronnie Prophet
- Country of origin: Canada
- Original language: English
- No. of seasons: 1

Production
- Producer: Bill Lynn
- Production location: Toronto
- Running time: 60 minutes

Original release
- Network: CBC Television
- Release: 10 August – 14 September 1973

Country Roads is a Canadian country music television program that aired on CBC Television in 1973.

== Premise ==
Ronnie Prophet hosted this Toronto-produced program filled in the time slot of The Tommy Hunter Show between seasons. It combined the performances new Canadian country musicians with humorous segments. Comedy characters included puppets Harold the Frog and Yackie Duck which were created by John and Alison Vandergun and voiced by Prophet. The rural newspaper publisher, Granny Slanders, was portrayed by comedian Gwen Neighbour. Regular segments of each episode included the "New Song Spot", "The Grease Spot" which featured rockabilly songs and "It's Cryin' Time Again" which featured country songs with sad themes.

== Scheduling ==
This hour-long program was broadcast on Fridays at 9:00 p.m. (Eastern) from 10 August to 14 September 1973.
