= Graham Townsend =

- Born: Graham Craig Townsend; June 16, 1942; Toronto, Ontario, Canada
- Died: December 3, 1998 (aged 56) Barrie, Ontario, Canada
- Genres: Canadian fiddle
- Occupations: Multi-instrumentalist, composer
- Instruments: Fiddle, mandolin, piano
- Years active: 1951–1998

Graham Craig Townsend (June 16, 1942 – December 3, 1998) was a Canadian fiddler, mandolin player, pianist and composer active from the 1950s through the 1990s.

== Background ==
Graham Townsend was born to Fred and Enid (nee Rainey) Townsend in Toronto, Ontario, in East York, where he attended school until the age of 14. (St. Clair Jr. High) being visually impaired from an early age. He grew up in Buckingham, Quebec, where his mother grew up, and absorbed the Irish, French and Scottish fiddle music of the Ottawa Valley that would later mold him into a prolific composer of over 400 tunes and a musician with a repertoire of nearly 4,000 fiddle tunes. Townsend began playing fiddle as a child and was winning competitions as early as nine years old. Graham’s father, Fred Townsend, worked as a square dance caller for Don Messer and, through this connection, Messer and Townsend became close friends in the early 1950’s, a friendship that continued until Messer’s death. Don Messer was one of Townsend's important and early musical influences, in addition to Irish fiddlers Tom McQuestion, who was his first fiddle teacher, and Billy Crawford, both whom lived in Toronto.

As Steve Fruitman from backtothesugarcamp.com has researched from Sam Cormier, Graham Townsend found himself immersed in the continual round of musical events graced by friends and neighbours of his immediate clan in Quebec. His grand-uncle, Eddie Dunning, was a technically proficient fiddler. Dunning's wife, Elizabeth Dunning, always welcomed a young Graham Townsend into their house like he received at home. There was another fiddling uncle, Sam Rainey, from Grenville, Quebec, whom Townsend was unable to see as often, but constituted an important influence on his development. Graham’s cousin, Gerald Houston in Poltimore, would take him to hear Billy and Lorne Smith, local fiddlers who specialized in Irish and Scottish music. From Dan LaSalle of Buckingham, Graham heard other French Canadian and Irish compositions that went outside of the restricted field of Canadian country fiddle tunes. Fruitman also notes that, although Don Messer, through the radio and his many recordings, was the folk fiddling idol of the masses across Canada, he was not the popular hero in the group in which Graham lived and played. Indeed, the early records Graham remembers best from his boyhood were those by (Joseph) Allard, Bouchard, Beaulieu and (Isadore) Soucy from Quebec, (Michael) Coleman, Morrison and Cronin from Ireland and Scott Skinner from Scotland.

== Awards ==
Townsend started to play old time music for dances, country fairs, garden parties and other engagements at the age of nine, and at the same age, entered and won CBC’s talent contest “Now’s Your Chance”. At 10 years of age, he guested with Cliff McKay on "Holiday Ranch" and thereafter entered the Canadian National Exhibition Fiddle Championship, which he won three years in succession (1951, 1952, 1953). He also won the Canadian Open Old Time Fiddle Championship in Shelburne, Ontario (1963, '68, '69, '70), the Simcoe Fiddle Championship (1957, 58), the Southern Ontario Fiddle Championship (1958, 59), the Kitchener Fiddle Championship (1959), the Peterborough Fiddle Championship (1959), the Northern Ontario Fiddle Championship (1959, 60), and the Pembroke International Championship (1965).

Townsend was inducted into the North American Fiddlers Hall of Fame in 1982, the Ottawa Valley Country Music Hall of Fame in 1990, the Canadian National Fiddling Hall of Fame in 1998 and was nominated for a Juno award for instrumental artist of the year in 1991. He also received a Lifetime Achievement Award from the Canadian Grand Masters Fiddling Association in 1998 for his fiddling achievements.

== Performing ==
Beginning in his teens, Townsend began to perform on tour and on radio and television, often with Messer. In January 1964, Graham Townsend was asked by a Hollywood producer to play on a new Country TV show, which was built around the artist’s background. He accepted the 36 week contract. The show was filmed in North Hollywood, California, and Toronto, Ontario. The show was called “Star Route” with narrator Rod Cameron, and was aired internationally. Townsend toured extensively throughout Europe and in Australia for the Canadian Broadcasting Corporation (CBC), the CTV Television Network, the Canadian government, and gave two command performances for Queen Elizabeth II. The first performance was on Parliament Hill in Ottawa for Expo 67 with step dancers Gilles Roy, Donny Gilchrist and button accordionist Phillippe Bruneau. The second performance was at the 1982 Commonwealth Games in Brisbane, Australia. He performed often with his wife Eleanor, whom he married in 1973, and among the many performers he worked with were Wilf Carter, Tommy Hunter, the McGarrigle sisters, Ronnie Prophet and Stan Rogers. In 1981, he was also the featured guest artist for the first Grand North American Old Time Fiddle Championship in Alberta. Townsend also performed in a tribute show to Don Messer and in many festivals as a solo artist throughout Canada, Australia, the United States and Europe.

Townsend’s style was steeped in Canada’s fiddling traditions and his many recordings for Banff, Rodeo, Rounder Records, Silver Eagle, Springwater and other labels have received significant acclaim. He helped to establish the Ontario Old Time Fiddlers Association. Graham Townsend also performed at the Tottenham Bluegrass Festival in June, 1995, the Pineridge Bluegrass Folklore Society show in Oshawa, Ontario in March, 1996 the CBC Canada Day Evening Performance on Parliament Hill in Ottawa July 1, 1996 and the Canadian Grand Masters Fiddling Competition in August 1998 as guest artist.

== Discography ==
- Championship Fiddle Favourites, Banff Rodeo GA 1006 (also released as London EBX 4128)
- Famous Canadian Fiddlers Vol 1: Graham Townsend, Banff Rodeo RBS 1083
- Fiddling Favourites with Graham Townsend, Banff Rodeo RBS 1116
- International Fiddling Championship 1963 - Introducing Graham Townsend, Banff Rodeo RBS 1163
- The Inimitable Graham Townsend, Banff Rodeo RBS 1239
- Graham Townsend Salutes Canada’s Centennial, Banff Rodeo RBS 1258
- Graham Townsend Salutes Canada’s Prime Ministers 1867-1967, Banff Rodeo RBS 1275
- Graham Townsend and His Fiddle, Banff Rodeo RBS 1284 & SBS 5284
- The Inimitable Graham Townsend, Banff Rodeo SBS 5239
- Graham Townsend & His Country Fiddle, Banff SBS 5296
- I Like Don Messer, Banff Rodeo SBS 5306
- World Champion Folk Fiddler, Banff Rodeo SBS 5406
- North American Fiddle Champion, Arc AS 817
- Swing Your Partner - Graham Townsend & His Backwoodsmen - Dance Calls by Fred Townsend, Point Records PS 368
- Old Time Fiddle Favourites of Ward Allen - played by Graham Townsend, MCA CB-30017
- Mandolin Favourites, Cheyenne Records 89003
- Mr. Country Fiddle, Marathon Music MMS-76046
- The Superb Fiddling of Graham Townsend, Audat Records 477-9079
- Le Violon - The Fiddle, Rounder Records 7002
- House Party, Rodeo Records RLP 8015
- Harvest Home, Point Records PS 357
- Down Home Fiddlin', Audat 477-9048
- Still Going Strong, Rodeo RLPCD 8044
- Country Licks & All That Jazz, CBC / Margaree 6397201

== Death ==
Townsend died from cancer on December 3, 1998, in Barrie, Ontario, Canada.
