= Al Cherney =

Al Cherny
- Born: Alexander Peter Chernywech; November 1, 1932; Medicine Hat, Alberta
- Died: August 23, 1989 (aged 56) Mississauga, Ontario
- Genre: Country
- Occupation: Fiddler
- Instrument: fiddle
- Years active: 1951–1989
- Formerly of: The Sons of the Saddle

Alexander Peter Chernywech (November 1, 1932 – August 25, 1989) recording as Al Cherny, was a Canadian fiddler. He studied with Frank Nowak and played country music on CHAT-FM.

Cherney won the Canadian Old Time Fiddlers' Contest in Ontario, under the novelty class from 1959 to 1961 and the open class in both 1960 and 1961.

In the early 1970s, he was a leading studio musician, recording with musician like Gary Buck, Dick Damron, Tommy Hunter, Jesse Winchester and Sylvia Tyson. He released more than ten studio albums and received an RPM Big Country Award for Top Country Instrumentalist in 1978.

From 1964, until his passing in 1989, Cherny was a regular, featured musician on the CBC's The Tommy Hunter Show. Cherny met Tommy Hunter when he worked at CKNX in Wingham, Ontario.

== Legacy ==
He was posthumously inducted into the Canadian Country Music Hall of Fame in 1989. He also performed regularly on The Tommy Hunter Show, until his death in 1989, of lung cancer.

== Discography ==
=== Albums ===
Year	Album
1965	North American Fiddle Champion (Plays Contest Winning Tunes)
1965	Plays Old Tyme Fiddle
1967	On Stage With Al Cherny AKA Al Cherny
1968	Golden Slippers
1969	Blue Ribbon Fiddle
1972	Fiddle Magic
1974	Rural Roots
1975	"The Big Fiddle Sound" Of Al Cherny
1975	Fiddle Country
1978	Country Club Hits of Al Cherny (Compilation)
1988	Al Cherny's Fiddle Party (Compilation)
1988	A Tribute to Al Cherny (Compilation)
2002	The Lost Recordings - Live

=== Singles ===
Year	Single	Peak positions
Year	Single	CAN Country
1972	"Shannon Waltz"	46
1972	"Mr. Bojangles"	45
