= Country Road (band) =

Swedish country band

- Origin: Örebro, Sweden
- Genres: country
- Years active: 1973–1984
- Labels: Viking, RCA, Scranta, Mill

Country Road was a country band in Örebro, Sweden, active between 1973 and 1984. The band played at the Grand Ole Opry in Nashville.

The band also managed to chart at the Swedish album charts.

== Members ==
Following people were members.

- Ann Persson
- Lise-Lott "Lotta"Carlsson
- Gunnar Norsten
- Kent Larsson/Larnebrant
- Ingemar Jörhag
- Björn "Bjucke" Alriksson
- Alfred "Fred" Hansen (gitarr)
- Elisabeth Lord
- Greger Agelid
- Jan Elander
- Lennart Tybell

== Discography ==
=== Albums ===
- Something New and Different - 1973
- Rhinestone Cowboy - 1974
- Here We Go Again - 1975
- John Denver's Country - 1975
- On a Foggy Misty Morning - 1976
- Rock 'n' Roll - 1977
- Somebody's Gonna Do It - 1978
- Country Road is Back - 1981
- On the Road Again - 1982
- Too Hot to Handle - 1984

=== Singles ===
- Never Been to Spain - 1973
