= Myles and Lenny =

Canadian folk-pop music group

- Origin: Toronto, Canada
- Years active: 1969–c. 1976
- Labels: GRT; Columbia
- Past members: Myles Cohen (guitar, vocals); Lenny Solomon (mandolin, violin/viola); Ivan Boudreau (bass); Rick Doyle (guitar); Saul Keshen (bass); Brian Leonard (drums); Bill MacKay (drums)

Myles and Lenny were a Canadian folk-pop music group based in Toronto who were most active during the 1970s.

== History ==
Myles and Lenny was formed in 1969 by its principal members, guitarist Myles Cohen and pianist/violinist Lenny Solomon. By 1972, they had been signed to GRT Records. They released a single, "Time to Know Your Friends". The group transferred to Columbia Records in 1974, and appeared on several television programs while continuing to perform live in small venues. The band released a self-titled record in 1975; the album included the Canadian Top 20 single "Can You Give it All to Me".

At the 1976 Juno Awards, the group won in the category of Most Promising Group. However, disappointing sales of their second album led to the group's demise in the mid-1970s. Cohen and Solomon since released various separate music projects.

== Discography ==
=== Albums ===
- 1975: Myles and Lenny (Columbia)
- 1975: It Isn't the Same (Columbia)

=== Singles ===
- 1972: "Time to Know Your Friends"
- 1974: "Can You Give it All to Me", RPM Magazine peak #19 February 1975
- 1974: "Hold On Lovers", #93 Canada, September 20, 1975
- 1975: "I Care Enough"
