= Rankin, Renfrew County, Ontario =

Settlement in Ontario, Canada

Rankin
- Dispersed Rural Community
- Interactive map of Rankin
- Coordinates: 45°41′13″N 77°6′1″W
- Country: Canada
- Province: Ontario
- County: Renfrew County
- Time zone: EST (UTC−05:00)
  - Summer (DST): EDT (UTC−04:00)

Rankin is a nominal community in Renfrew County, Ontario, Canada.
