= Comin' Up Country =

- Genre: Country music
- Presented by: Tim Daniels; Julia Lynn
- Country of origin: Canada
- Original language: English
- No. of seasons: 1

Production
- Running time: 60 minutes

Original release
- Network: CBC Television
- Release: 6 May – 27 May 1977

Comin' Up Country is a Canadian country music television miniseries that aired on CBC Television in 1977.

== Premise ==
Tim Daniels and Julia Lynn hosted this Halifax-produced series with bluegrass band Meadowgreen, which was led by Vic Mullin. Various guest artists were also featured.

== Scheduling ==
This hour-long series was broadcast Fridays at 9:00 p.m. (Eastern) from 6 to 27 May 1977.
