= Ronnie Prophet =

Canadian American country musician and comedy performer (1937–2018)

- Born: Ronald Lawrence Victor Prophet; 26 December 1937; Hawkesbury, Ontario, Canada
- Died: 2 March 2018 (aged 80) Tavares, Florida, U.S.
- Genres: Country
- Occupation: Singer
- Instrument(s): Vocals, guitar
- Years active: 1973–2018
- Spouse: Glory-Anne Carriere

Ronald Lawrence Victor Prophet (26 December 1937 – 2 March 2018) was a Canadian-American country musician and comedy performer.

He was born in Hawkesbury, Ontario, Canada. In his childhood, Prophet lived in Calumet, Quebec, and began performing at local venues in his youth. His successful musical career in the United States began in the mid-1960s. Prophet also performed in numerous Canadian television productions in the 1970s including Grand Old Country and The Ronnie Prophet Show.

From 1997, he was based in Branson, Missouri, United States, and was married to musician Glory-Anne Carriere.

Prophet died on 2 March 2018 at his home in Tavares, Florida, following cardiac and kidney failure. He was 80.

== Awards and recognition ==
- 1978: winner, Juno Award, Country Male Vocalist of the Year
- 1979: winner, Juno Award, Country Male Vocalist of the Year
- 1980: nominee, Juno Award, Country Male Vocalist of the Year
- 1984: winner Canadian Country Music Duo of the Year with Glory-Anne Carriere
- 1984: winner Canadian Country Music Entertainer of the Year
- 1985: Ottawa Valley Country Music Hall of Fame
- 1987: nominee, Juno Award, Country Male Vocalist of the Year
- 1999: inductee, Canadian Country Music Hall of Fame

== Singles ==
Year	Single	Peak chart positions			Album
Year	Single	CAN Country	CAN AC	US Country	Album
1973	"San Diego"	36	35	—	Faces & Phases of Ronnie Prophet
1975	"Sanctuary"	20	30	26	Ronnie Prophet (1976)
1976	"Shine On"	13	—	36	Ronnie Prophet (1976)
1976	"It's Enough"	33	—	50	Ronnie Prophet (1976)
1976	"Big Big World"	13	—	82	Ronnie Prophet (1976)
1977	"Phone Call from Allyson"	19	—	—	Ronnie Prophet (1976)
1977	"It Ain't Easy Loving Me"	27	—	99	Ronnie Prophet Country
1979	"Everybody Needs a Love Song"	49	—	—	Non-album song
1979	"The Phantom of the Opry"	3	—	—	The Phantom
1981	"Every Story in the Book"	19	—	—	The Phantom
1982	"The Ex-Superstar's Waltz"	8	—	—	I Need a Lover
1982	"I Need a Lover"	18	—	—	I Need a Lover
1983	"Smooth Operator"	37	—	—	I'm Gonna Love Him Out of You
1983	"I'm Gonna Love Him Out of You"	30	—	—	I'm Gonna Love Him Out of You
1986	"Stealer of Hearts"	14	—	—	Ronnie Prophet (1987)
1986	"Don't Take Her to Heart"	27	—	—	Ronnie Prophet (1987)
1987	"No Holiday in L.A."	9	17	—	Ronnie Prophet (1987)
1987	"If You're Up for Love"	17	—	—	Ronnie Prophet (1987)
1988	"Fire in the Feeling"	42	—	—	Ronnie Prophet (1987)
1988	"Breaking Up Ain't Hard to Do"	55	—	—	Ronnie Prophet (1987)
1989	"Trying to Outrun Your Memory"	61	—	—	Non-album song
1990	"Touch of Class"	37	—	—	Prophet of Love
1990	"You've Got Me Right Where I Want Me"	47	—	—	Non-album song
1991	"I Won't Be There"	35	—	—	Prophet of Love
1991	"The Feeling of Love"	59	—	—	Prophet of Love
1992	"Prophet of Love"	86	—	—	Prophet of Love

=== Singles with Glory-Anne Carriere ===
Year	Single	Peak chart positions	Album
Year	Single	CAN Country	Album
1982	"Storybook Children"	32	Non-album song
1984	"If This Is Love"	6	Sure Thing
1985	"I'm Glad We're Bad at Something"	10	Sure Thing
1985	"I'll Be There"	31	Sure Thing
1987	"Lucky in Love"	57	Sure Thing
1989	"Two Hearts"	77	Prophet of Love

=== Guest singles ===
Year	Single	Artist	Peak chart positions	Album
Year	Single	Artist	CAN Country	Album
1988	"Honest to Goodness Amigos"	Ray Griff	86	Honest to Goodness Amigos
