= La Grande Gigue Simple =

"Canadian traditional dance and tune"

La Grande Gigue Simple (French: The Great Simple Jig), sometimes shortened as Gigue Simple, or La Jig du Bas Canada (French: The Lower Canada Jig) is a traditional fiddle tune and jig culturally relevant to Acadians, the colony of Acadia, Voyageurs, the Québécois people, and the Canadian Province of Quebec. The tune inspired and is possibly a precursor to the Red River Jig which was brought westward to the Canadian Prairies during the North American fur trade which was later a staple of Métis fiddle music.

== Overview ==
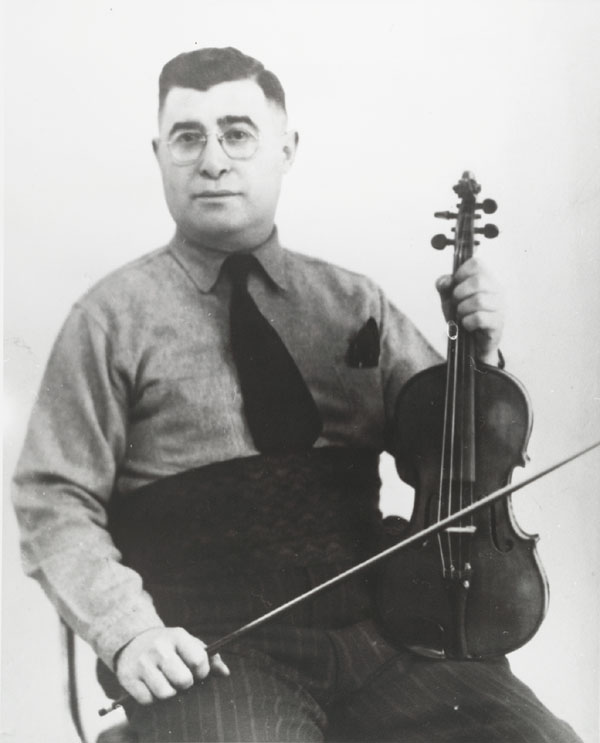
French-Canadian composer Isidore Soucy, whose 1936 recording of la Grande Gigue Simple was popularized in Quebec

According to the Canadian Broadcasting Corporation, la Grande Gigue Simple has its origins in the early 1800s, it is also known by the name La Jig du Bas Canada (The Lower Canada Jig). The tune and jig in almost exclusive to Quebec, specifically Quebec City, and the New France colony of Acadia (now The Maritimes region). The Indigenous Peoples Atlas of Canada also notes that the song originates from French-Canadians in the 1800s and is a variant of the Scottish Tune "Big John McNeil" by Scottish violinist Peter Milne.

According to Canadian fiddle musician Anne Lederman, la Grande Gigue Simple is actually used for solo step-dancing as opposed to jigging. Lederman suggests that la Grande Gigue Simple possibly had its origins as a Scottish hornpipe in 6/4 time or "old hornpipe" time. Likewise, in the book The Fiddler's Companion by Andrew Kuntz also states that la Grande Gigue Simple is a reel rather than a jig. Kuntz, who also operates the Traditional Tunes Archive (TTA) of Canada notes that la Grande Gigue Simple is a regional Gaspe title.

Canadian musician Ray W. Gibbons states that there are differences between la Grande Gigue Simple and the similar popular tune in Western Canada, the Red River Jig. The main difference lays in the fact that la Grande Gigue Simple is played in the melody of D minor, the melody is played on the violin tunes in an upward a/d/a1/e1 scordatura, and the melody is played to accompany a step dance or reel. The similarities that the two tunes share are that they are both played in tandem with clogging in the normal "under-the-chin" manner.

Gibbons states in his book Folk Fiddling in Canada: a Sampling from 1981 that ten total recordings of la Grande Gigue exist, seven commercial releases and three field recordings, the majority of which were recorded before 1935. Recordings of la Grande Gigue Simple are scarce according to Gibbons because the jig was passed down via oral tradition, hence the history of the jig is poorly known. One notable recording of the la Grande Gigue Simple comes from Isidore Soucy (1899–1963) recorded in 1936. Soucy was a notable French-Canadian composer from Sainte-Blandine, Quebec. The song is within the public domain and available on the Internet Archive.

== See also ==
- French-Canadian music
- Culture of Quebec
- Acadian culture
- Métis fiddle
- Red River Jig
