= 2010 Winter Olympics opening ceremony =

- Part of 2010 Winter Olympics
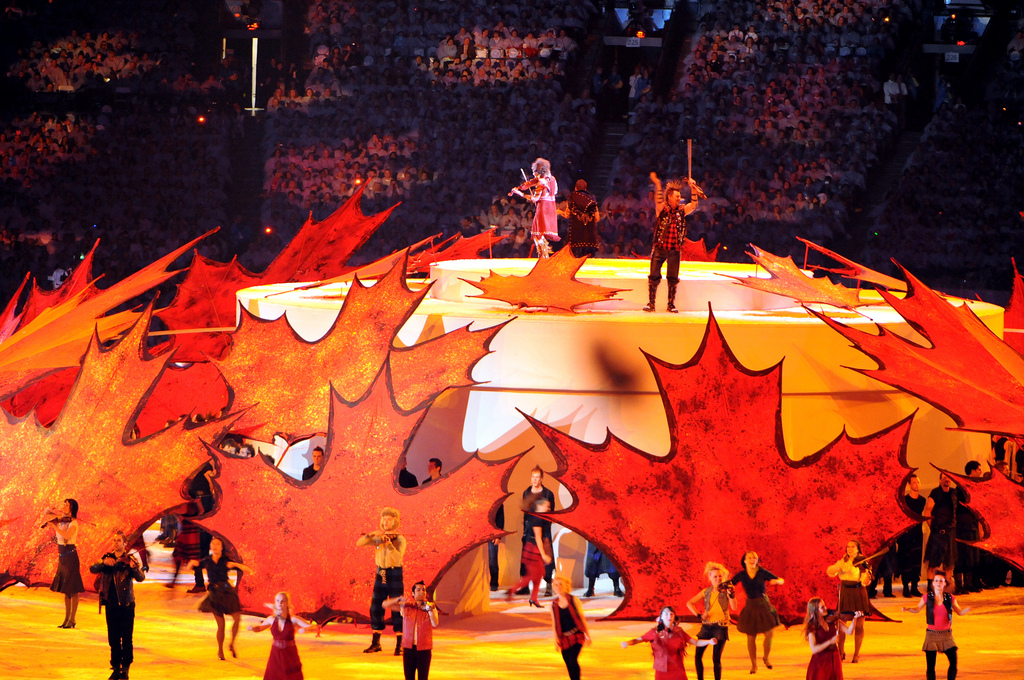
- Canadian fiddlers perform during the Opening Ceremony of the XXI Olympic Winter Games at BC Place stadium
- Date: 12 February 2010; 16 years ago
- Time: 18:00 – 21:00 PST (UTC−8)
- Venue: BC Place
- Location: Vancouver, British Columbia, Canada; 49°16′36″N 123°6′43″W
- Filmed by: Olympic Broadcasting Services (OBS)
- Footage: Full opening ceremony on the IOC YouTube channel on YouTube

The opening ceremony of the 2010 Winter Olympics was held on February 12, 2010, beginning at 6:00 pm PST (02:00 UTC, February 13) at BC Place Stadium in Vancouver, British Columbia, Canada. This was the first Olympic opening ceremony to be held indoors. It was directed by David Atkins.

The event was officially opened by Michaëlle Jean, Governor General of Canada, the representative of Elizabeth II, Queen of Canada. The opening ceremony was dedicated by the Vancouver Organizing Committee (VANOC) to Nodar Kumaritashvili, a Georgian luger who had died earlier in the day in a training run. An audience of 61,600 was in attendance at the venue, and there were an estimated 4,500 performers.

== Production ==
The production's director was David Atkins, who directed the Sydney 2000 Olympic and 2006 Doha Asian Games ceremonies. The opening and closing ceremonies had a combined budget of $48.5 million (it received $20 million (CA$) funding from the Department of Canadian Heritage while VANOC contributed the rest). Much of the instrumental music for the ceremony was written by Dave Pierce, Gavin Greenaway, and Donovan Seidle.

At certain moments of the show, the music was performed by the orchestra conducted by Pierce, but at others the music was performed for technical reasons at the Stadium via playback.

In an interview published on December 15, 2010, John Furlong, the CEO of VANOC revealed that Celine Dion had been contracted to sing the national anthem at the opening ceremony. But, she unilaterally terminated the contract when she discovered in late 2009 that she was pregnant and was replaced by then 16-year-old Nikki Yanofsky. In addition, Furlong also revealed that "a famous Quebec composer" was contracted to provide musical elements to the show. That composer, whom he would not name, backed out of arrangement months before the Games over what he termed "philosophical differences." As a result, the artist refused to allow VANOC access to his music's rights and the organizing committee had to replan the final segment of the cultural part of the ceremony. There is speculation within the local media that the opening ceremony's cultural show finale act "We Are More," featuring slam poetry by Shane Koyczan, served as a last minute replacement for the ending segment featuring the Quebec composer's music. VANOC had also requested that the Cirque du Soleil members to perform in all the show segments; however, the Cirque was unable to fit this into their schedule.

== Program ==
=== Dedication ===
At 5:59 (PST), a PA system announced that the opening ceremony would be dedicated in memory of the Georgian luger Nodar Kumaritashvili, who had died in a training accident earlier that day.

=== Opening section ===
Giant video screens showed Canadian snowboarder Johnny Lyall sliding down a mountain slope, with the dates and locations of previous Winter Olympic games were recalled in voiceover. As the 1988 games in Calgary were mentioned, Lyall passed through a row of torchbearers in the shape of the Canadian symbol: the maple leaf. When Vancouver 2010 is announced, the video cuts to live footage of Lyall snowboarding off of a jump and through a set of Olympic Rings inside the stadium, while snow and ice exploded from the rings, and him welcoming the crowd.

=== National anthem ===
A guard of honour mounted by the RCMP marched the Canadian Flag to the flagpost. There a guard of honour composed of Canadian Forces members raised the flag. Nikki Yanofsky performed an arrangement of the national anthem, "O Canada", singing in English and French.

=== Welcome by the First Nations of Canada ===
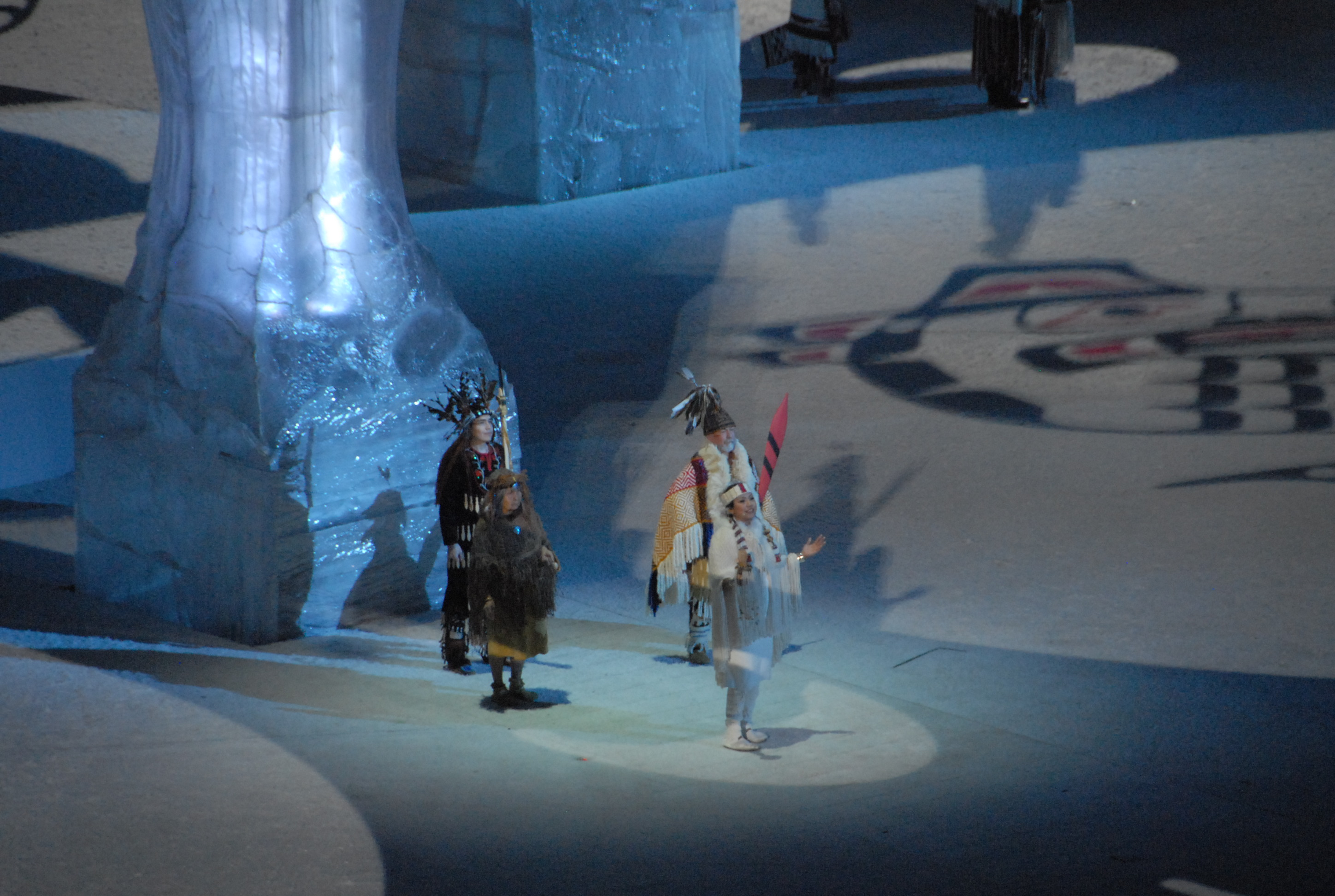
One of the four welcomes delivered by the First Nations representatives

The First Nations in whose traditional territories the games were held - the Squamish Nation, Musqueam Indian Band, Lil'wat First Nation, and Tsleil-Waututh First Nation - were recognized as heads of state and seated directly behind the Canadian Governor General and the prime minister. Four Coast Salish welcome poles were raised from the centre of the stadium, and greetings were given to the crowd (and the world) by members of the Four Host First Nations in their respective languages as well as English and French. The arms of the poles were raised in a traditional gesture of greeting to welcome the athletes and the world. Following the greetings, groups of dancers from other main culture-regions of Indigenous peoples in Canada were introduced, including the Métis Nation and the Inuit, as well as the Peoples of the Northwest, the Peoples of the Plains and the Peoples of the East and took places around the welcome poles and a large drum surface between them, forming a welcome circle to prepare for the forthcoming Parade of the Nations and danced traditional welcoming dances as the athletes paraded in.

=== Parade of the Nations ===
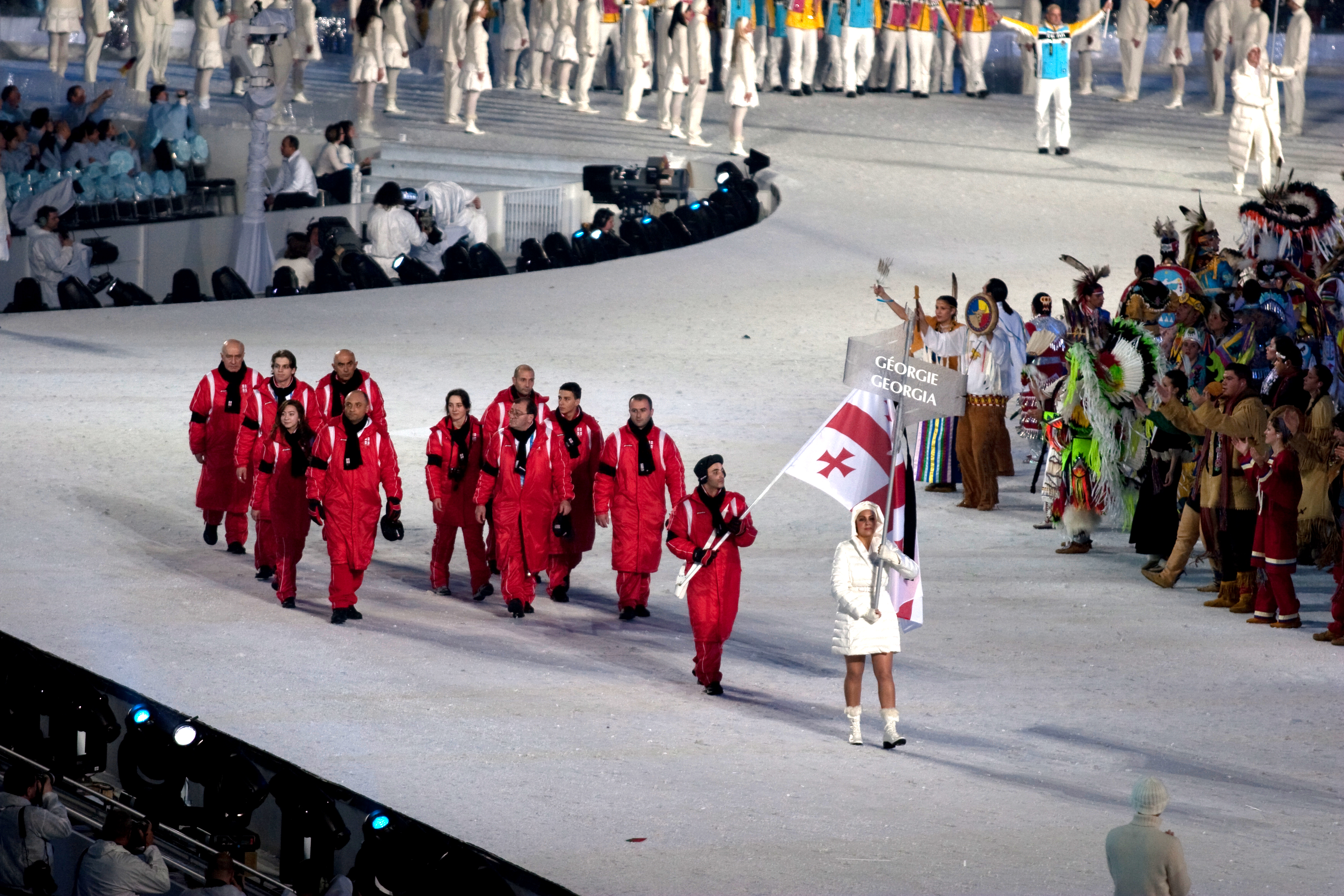
The Georgian athletes entering the stadium. To remember Nodar Kumaritashvili's death, a black ribbon was tied on the flag.

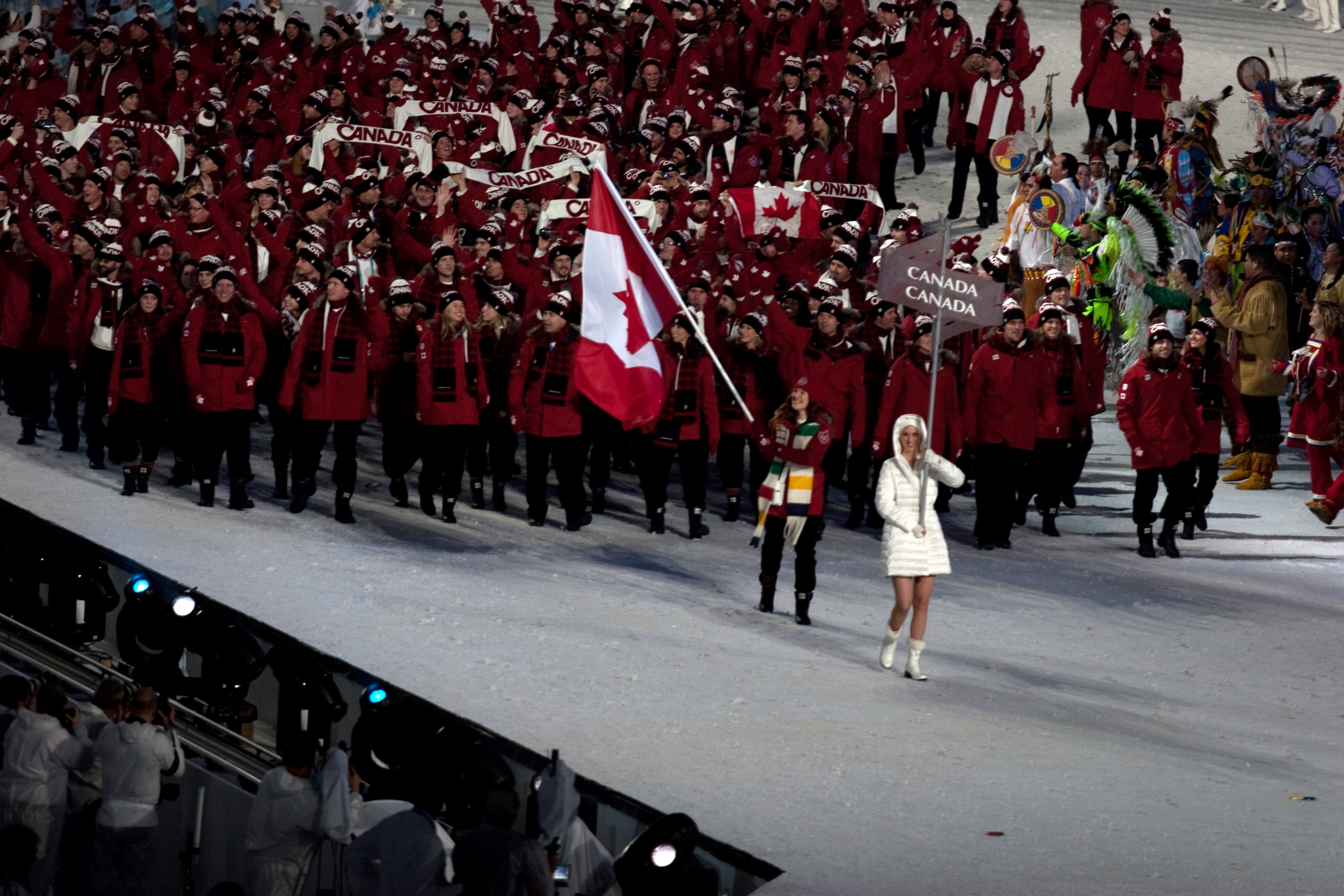
The entrance of the Canadian athletes into BC Place Stadium.

The participating countries marched in, with Greece coming first, then the other nations ending with the host nation, Canada. The names of the nations were announced first in French and followed by English, the official languages of the Olympics, which also happened to be the official languages of the host nation. The nations entered in alphabetic order of their country names in English because it is the more dominant of the two languages in Vancouver and in the province of British Columbia.

The team from Georgia was greeted with a standing ovation out of respect for their colleague, Nodar Kumaritashvili, who died in a luge accident earlier that day. The team left an empty space in the processional and left the stadium immediately following the procession. They had indicated they would not participate in the opening ceremony or withdraw completely, but decided against doing so. The team wore black scarves and armbands to honor Kumaritashvili while a black ribbon was affixed to the team's flag. Teams from some countries, including Australia, Azerbaijan also wore black armbands in respect of Kumaritashvili.

The United States, the largest delgation, received one of the loudest ovations. After the United States, Uzbekistan were the only team to enter before host nation Canada.

=== Athlete Tribute Song ===
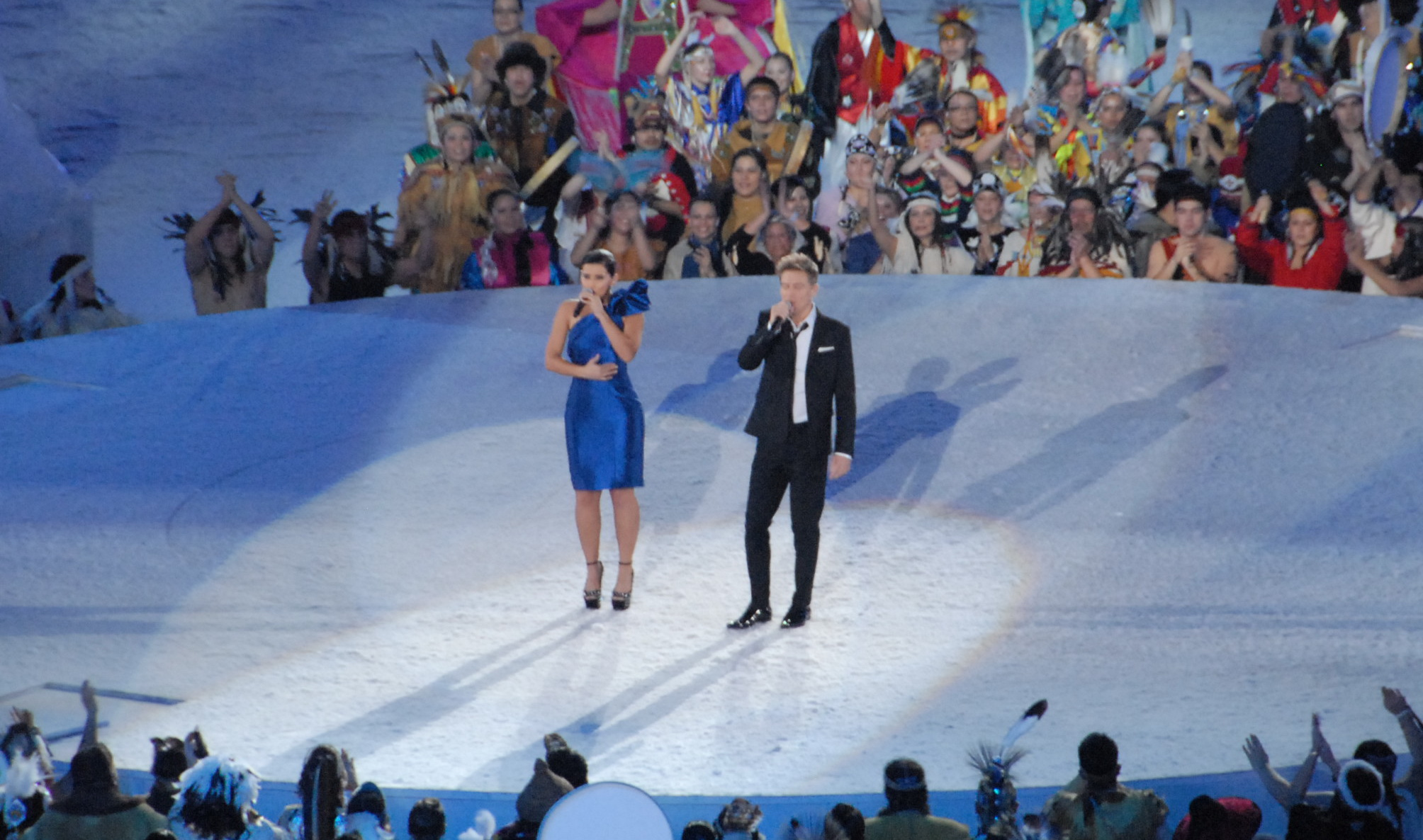
Nelly Furtado and Bryan Adams on centre stage.

Nelly Furtado and Bryan Adams, both themselves Vancouver residents performed "Bang the Drum", which was written by Adams and producer Jim Vallance as a tribute to the Olympic athletes present.

=== The Landscape of a Dream ===
The cultural section of the opening ceremony was titled "The Landscape of a Dream" whose purpose was to celebrate the diverse geography and people of Canada. It was directed by David Atkins and the narration was provided by Donald Sutherland, himself one of the Olympic flag bearers. It featured tributes to different regions of Canada.

==== Hymn to the North ====
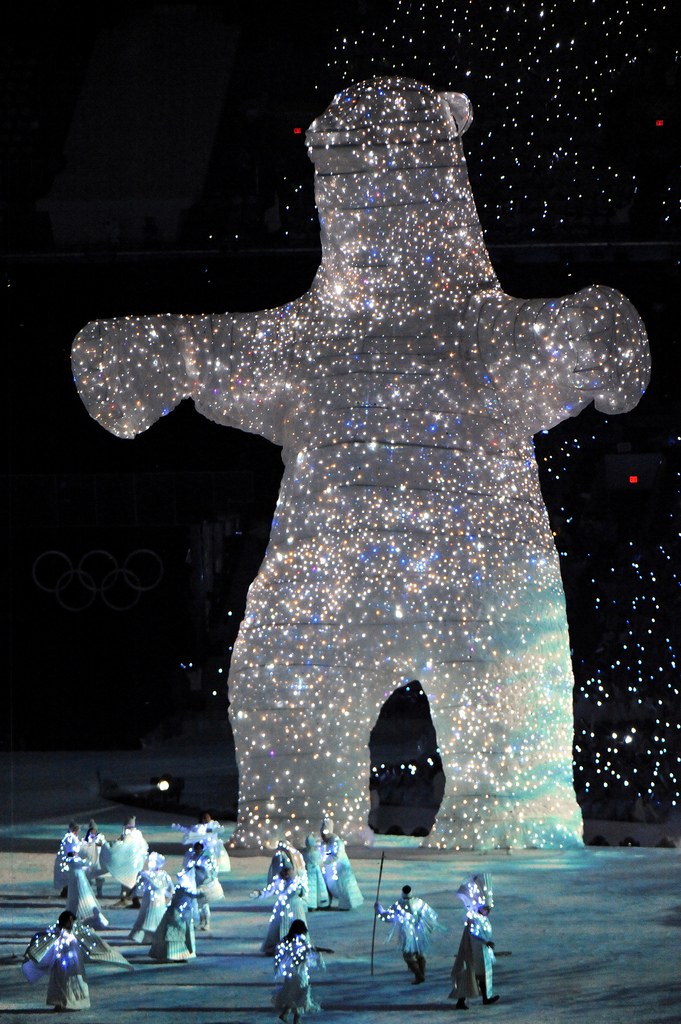
Spirit bear puppet

A Tribute to Northern Canada After Nelly Furtado and Bryan Adams had finished their performance, snow began to fall throughout the stadium. Performers, dressed in winter clothes representing native and a variety of immigrant groups, walked about and mingled on the stage floor. Their leader took his staff and banged it on the ground, producing waves of light rippling on the floor. The northern lights and different constellations of animals appeared. A giant, sparkling puppet (one of the largest puppets ever created) of a spirit or Kermode bear that rose from the stadium floor, and hovered over the performers, who were standing on a simulated ice floe. After a few seconds, the ice began to break up, and the performers "floated" to the edge of the stage, where they disappeared. The ice breaking away gave way to a huge arctic sea, where simulated whales swam while breathing until next transition.

==== Sacred Grove ====
- Opened with brown Coast Salish welcome poles rising up, symbolizing welcome. Red salmon rose from the floor to the ceiling via the poles, representing salmon spawning. Foliage appeared on top of the poles, symbolizing a lush grove of trees. Dancers from Alberta Ballet and Ballet BC assembled around the grove as a quote from My Heart Soars by Chief Dan George was read. Sarah McLachlan, herself a Vancouver resident though born in Halifax, performed her song "Ordinary Miracle" while the dancers danced in and around the grove. The ballet dancers also danced to "Adagio for Strings" by Samuel Barber as the grove turned into a starry sky. All turned white and the performers rose to the ceiling after this piece finished.

==== Rhythms of the Autumn ====
This tribute to the fiddling traditions of Canada paying homage to the Anglo-Celtic roots of European Canadian settler culture began with the appearance of the horned fiddler in a flying canoe, a reference to the story of the Chasse-galerie, where the Devil rode a magical canoe. As the canoe descended from the ceiling, the opening of the song "The Old Ways" was performed by Loreena McKennitt.

- Fiddler/aerialist Colin Maier, dressed as the Devil from the French-Canadian folk legend, attired in stylized Celtic clothing, duelled with his shadow that appears on the moon (a pre-recorded projection of Colin fiddling and dancing a brief jig). The stage was here covered with big red maple leaves, and Colin's cape was also a large leaf itself. The song played during this sequence are the first moments of "The Old Ways".
- There were six lead "Hero Fiddlers" on the centre stage: Andre Brunet (of Le Vent du Nord, representing Quebec), Daniel Lapp (representing British Columbia, where Vancouver is located), Sierra Noble (representing the Métis fiddle), Samantha Robichaud (representing Acadian/Cape Breton fiddling), April Verch (from Ontario, despite representing the Prairies) and famous Cape Breton fiddler Ashley MacIsaac.
- Surrounding the Hero Fiddlers are a group of tap dancers representing the Canadian stepdance traditions, dressed in costumes matching those worn by each fiddler. When the five Hero Fiddlers start performing together, the dancers break into a ceilidh polka.
- A tap dancer, Brock Jellison, dressed in a hybrid costume of the Hero Fiddlers' outfits, called a river to encircle the main podium. At this point, a group of "Hero Tappers" placed above the "river" join into a modern urban tap routine, transitioning the folk sequences to contemporary Canada and urban Vancouver.
- During the segment, fiddler Calvin Vollrath, who was sitting next to the orchestra, performed "Fiddle Nation", a tune he'd composed; each segment represents a certain fiddling style in Canada.
- This portion of the ceremony was concluded by Ashley MacIsaac who performed his Celtic punk rendition of the traditional 19th century Scottish strathspey tune "Devil in the Kitchen". While Ashley performed, the Hero Tappers turned on sparklers on their tap shoes.

==== Who Has Seen the Wind ====
"Who Has Seen the Wind" was a tribute to Canadian Prairies. A lone boy, Thomas Saulgrain (L'École Nationale de Cirque) stood in the centre of the floor in a square of wheat field. A voice quoted from the novel Who Has Seen the Wind (novel) by W. O. Mitchell. As the boy began running, he was lifted up and performed ballet on fly wire. A rendition of the song "Both Sides, Now" by Joni Mitchell was played during this segment.

==== Peaks of Endeavour ====
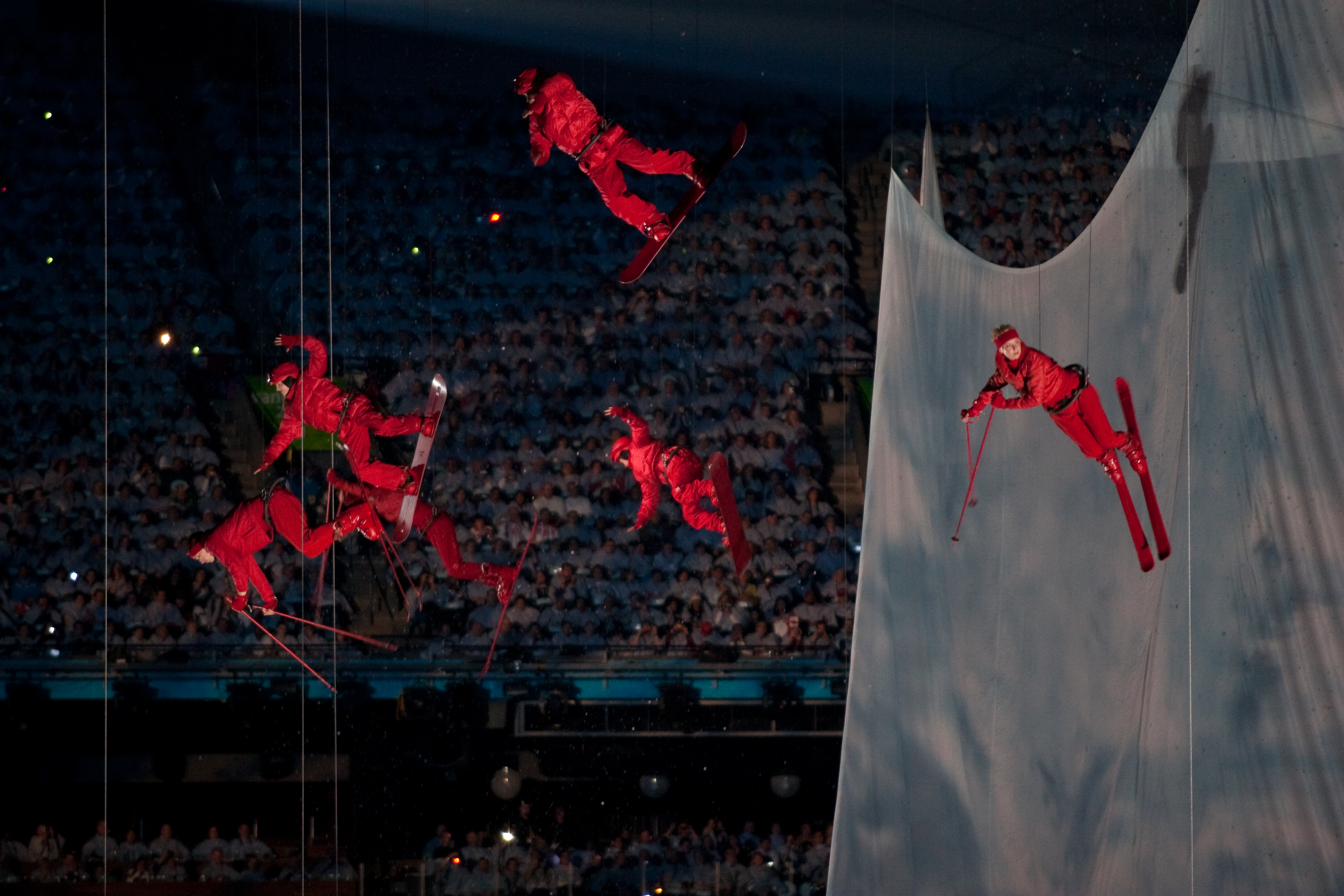
Aerialists mimicking skiing and snowboarding down a mountain

"Peaks of Endeavour" was a tribute to the Canadian Rockies and Western Canada. After the previous segment had ended, a storm was stimulated and clouds seemed to fall to the ground. As the clouds gave away, mountains, resembling the Rocky Mountains, rose from the floor. A George Vancouver quote was read by Donald Sutherland, and skiers and snowboarders hung from wires to simulate going down the artificial mountains. Images of winter sports in action exploded onto the mountains, which finally gave way to sports victories. Inline skaters mimicked figure skaters and speed skaters, circling the artificial mountains as the videos of sports changed to the Vancouver skyline. Coloured lines of light representing flowing traffic surrounded the mountain.

==== We Are More ====
After the mountains that had been the feature for "Peaks of Endeavor" fell away, Shane Koyczan performed slam poetry, a variation on his "We Are More". (transcript) Performers formed a giant maple leaf around Koyczan with red flares to end off his section.

=== Opening remarks/Official Opening ===
The opening remarks began with Jacques Rogge, President of the IOC, who offered sympathy for the loss of Georgian luge athlete, Nodar Kumaritashvili. A welcome from John Furlong, Chair of the Vancouver Organizing Committee, was then delivered. (transcript) A statement by Rogge followed, mixing English and French. Finally, Michaëlle Jean, Governor General of Canada, declared the games officially open, first in French, then in English.

=== Song of Peace ===
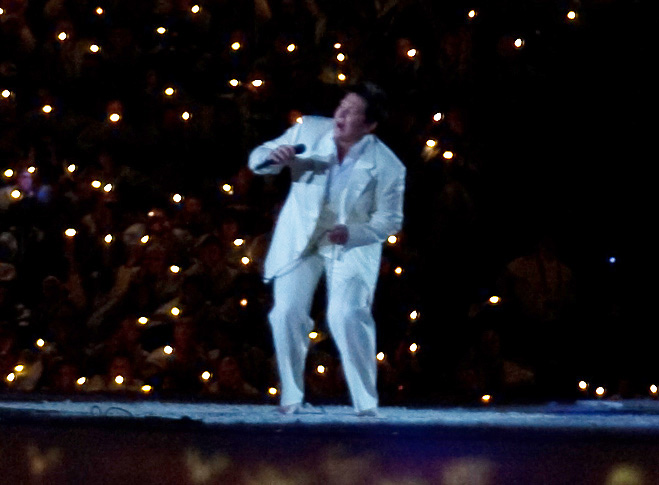
k.d. lang performing

k.d. lang performed a version of Leonard Cohen's "Hallelujah". While she was singing, doves, the symbol of peace, were projected on the stage floor, and rose from the stage floor to the ceiling via columns to symbolize their release.

=== Entry of the Olympic Flag ===
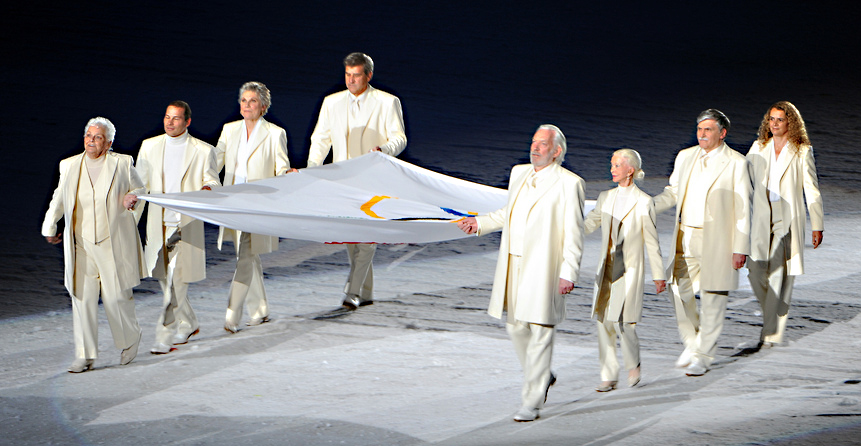
Entrance of the Olympic flag

Former hockey star Bobby Orr; musician Anne Murray; Formula One champion Jacques Villeneuve; Betty Fox, the mother of cancer research champion Terry Fox; actor Donald Sutherland; gold medal figure skater Barbara Ann Scott; UNAMIR commander Roméo Dallaire; and Julie Payette, Canadian astronaut, carried the flag into the stadium. They then transferred the flag to members of the RCMP, who then raised the flag. Canadian opera singer Measha Brueggergosman sang the Olympic Hymn, mixing English and French.

Afterwards, a minute of silence was observed for the Georgian luger Nodar Kumaritashvili's death, during which time both the Canadian and Olympic flags were lowered to half-mast. Upon learning of Kumaritashvili's death, the Governor General of Canada-in-Council ordered flags on federal government buildings throughout the province of British Columbia, including at all Olympic venues, flown at half-mast until midnight, February 13, 2010.

=== Olympic Oaths ===
Canadian woman's ice hockey player Hayley Wickenheiser took the oath on behalf of all 2010 Olympic athletes in English, while the officials' oath was taken by short-track speed skating referee Michel Verrault in French.

=== Song ===
Garou sang "Un peu plus haut, un peu plus loin" (A Little Higher, A Little Further), written by Jean-Pierre Ferland.

=== Lighting of the Cauldron ===
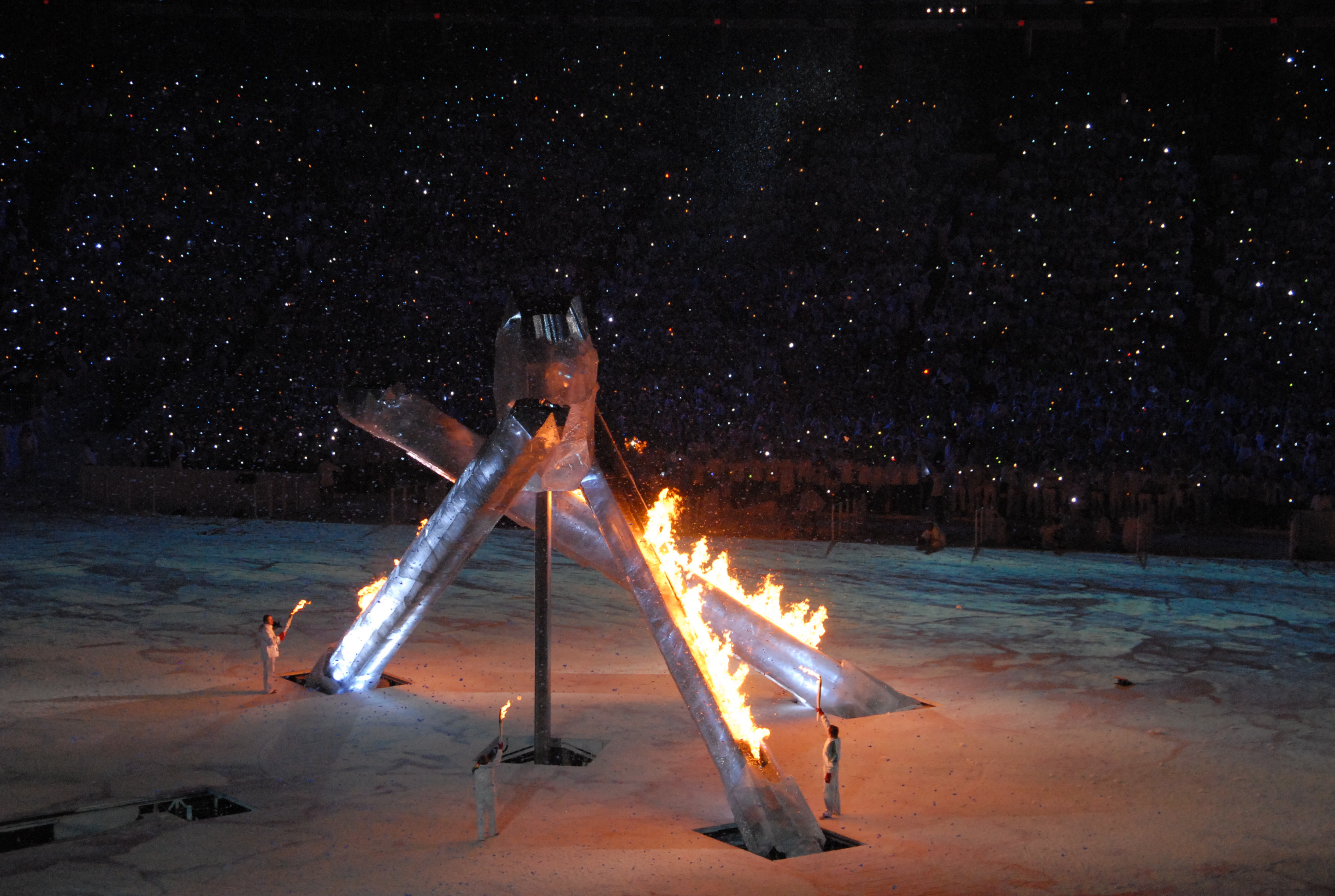
The interior cauldron, in the process of being lit

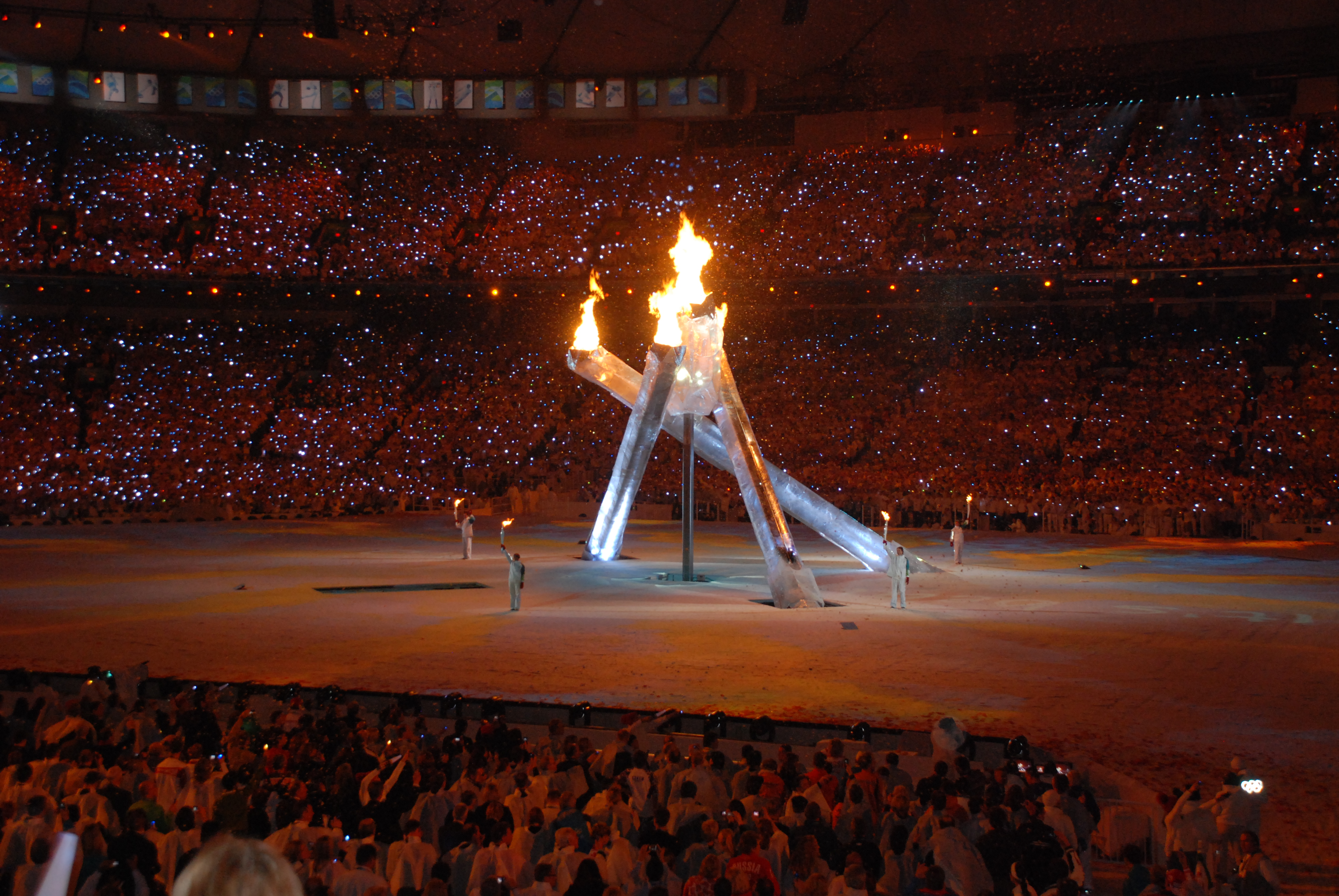
The interior cauldron, fully lit.

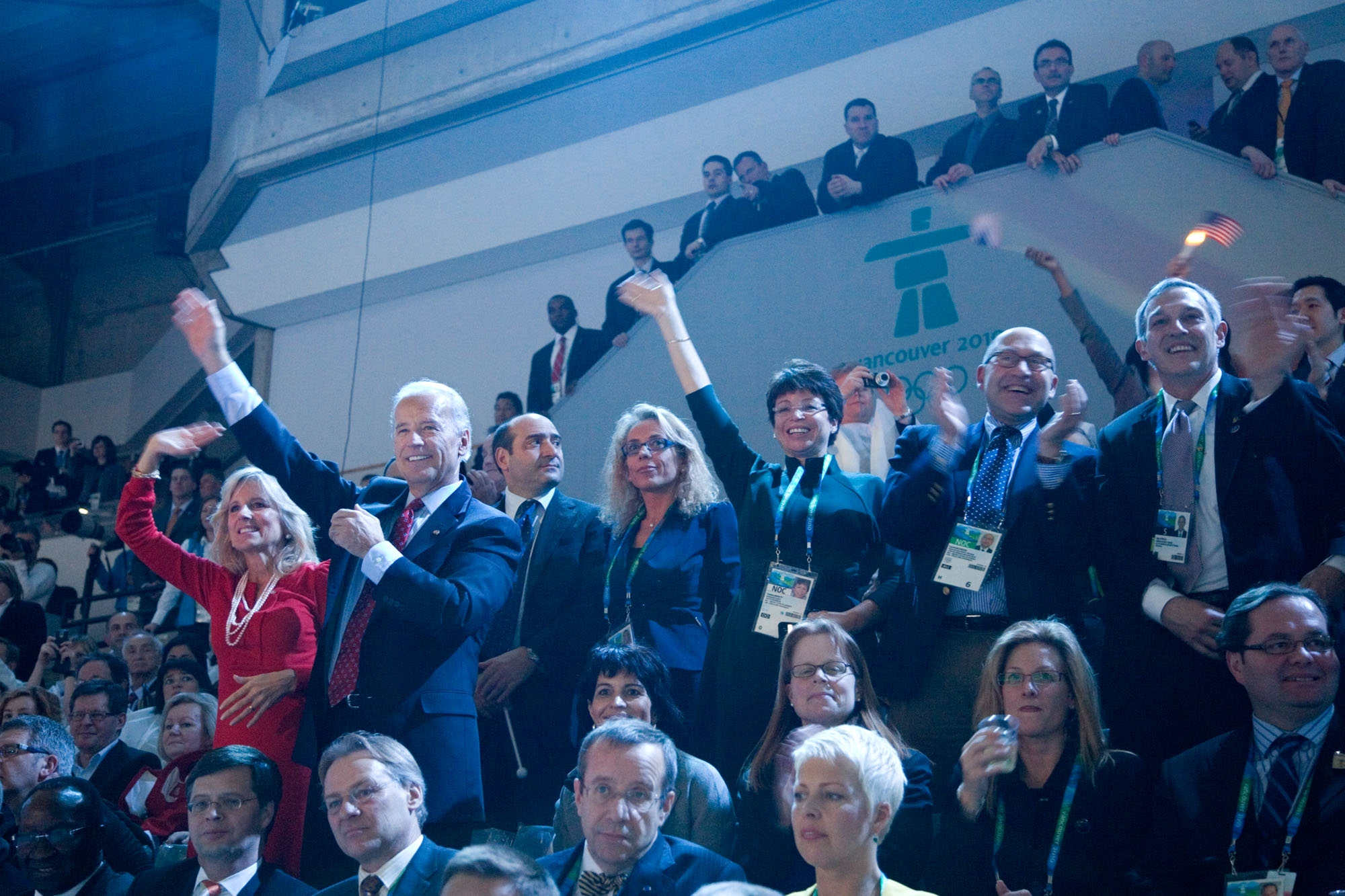
American Vice President (and future President) Joe Biden and his wife Jill at the opening ceremony.

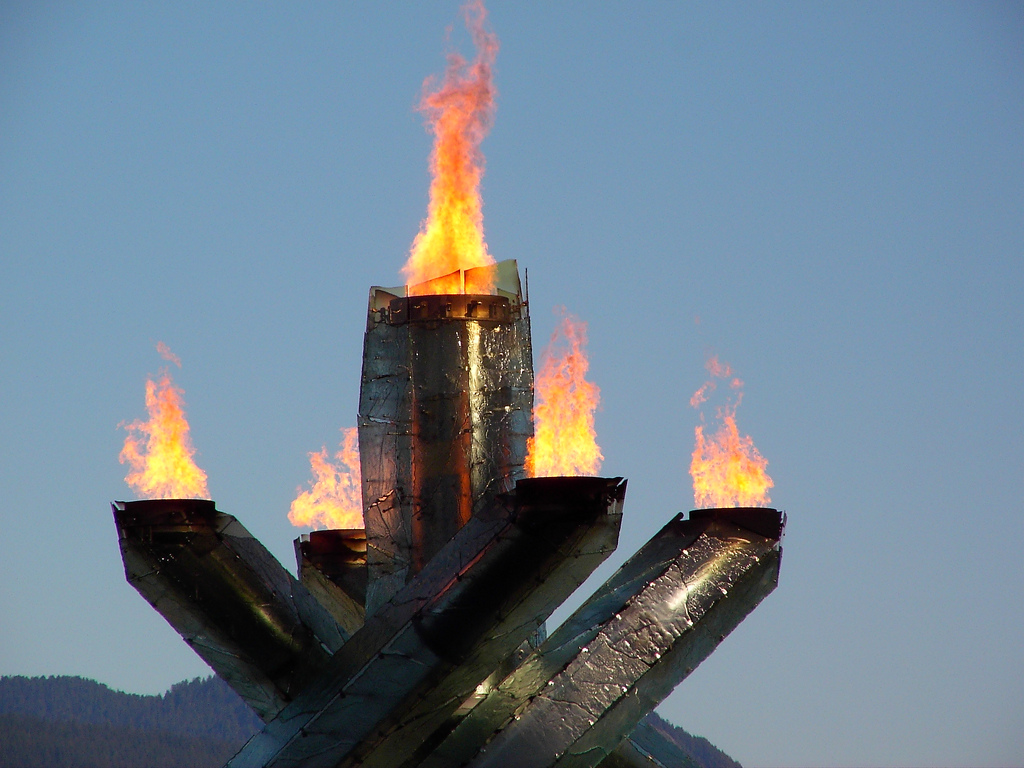
The exterior cauldron, after having been lit

Rick Hansen, paraplegic athlete and paralympic medalist, carried the flame into BC Place stadium and lit the torch of speed skater Catriona Le May Doan, who in turn lit the torch of basketball All-Star Steve Nash. Nash then lit skier Nancy Greene's torch who lit the torch of Wayne Gretzky, Hall of Fame hockey player. Le May Doan, Nash, Greene, and Gretzky then made their way to their four pre-determined locations on the stadium floor to await the raising of the cauldron. Due to a malfunction of the Olympic cauldron's hydraulic system, only three of the four arms came up before it was lit. Le May Doan's designated arm of the cauldron had malfunctioned, so she stood by as the other three athletes lit the cauldron at the same time by touching the base of the arms with their respective torches.

Under IOC rules, the lighting of the Olympic cauldron must be witnessed by those attending the opening ceremony, implying that it must be lit at the location where the ceremony is taking place. Although another IOC rule states that the cauldron should be witnessed outside by the entire residents of the entire host city, this was not possible since the ceremony took place indoors. However, VANOC secretly built a second outdoor cauldron next to the West Building of the Vancouver Convention Centre, and Gretzky was secretly chosen to light this permanent cauldron. Quickly word spread through the downtown Vancouver area that Gretzky was indeed the final torchbearer, and very soon a crush of people came running after the police escort to cheer Gretzky on and hopefully catch a glimpse of him carrying the torch to the outdoor cauldron.

The closing ceremony of the games would begin with a tongue-in-cheek homage to the indoor cauldron malfunction, featuring mime Yves Dagenais repairing and finally raising the missing arm of the cauldron, and offering Le May Doan a chance to finally light her arm of the interior cauldron.

== Anthems ==
- National Anthem of Canada – Nikki Yanofsky
- (International Olympic Committee) Olympic Hymn – Measha Brueggergosman

== Dignitaries and other officials in attendance ==
- Michaëlle Jean, Governor General of Canada
- Jean-Daniel Lafond, Viceregal consort of Canada
- Stephen Harper, Prime Minister of Canada
- Laureen Harper, Spouse of the Prime Minister of Canada
- Gordon Campbell, Premier of British Columbia, and his wife Nancy Campbell
- Chiefs of the Four Host First Nations whose traditional lands the Olympics were hosted on (treated as heads of state):
  - Lil'wat Chief Leonard Andrew
  - Musqueam Chief Ernie Campbell
  - Squamish Chief Bill Williams
  - Tsleil-Waututh Chief Justin George
- Toomas Hendrik Ilves, President of Estonia
- Evelin Ilves, First Lady of Estonia
- Laine Jänes, Estonian minister of culture
- Mikheil Saakashvili, President of Georgia
- Valdis Zatlers, President of Latvia
- Albert II, Prince of Monaco
- Doris Leuthard, President of the Swiss Federal Council
- Gordon Brown, Prime Minister of the United Kingdom
- Joe Biden, Vice President of the United States (representing President Barack Obama)
- Jill Biden, Second Lady of the United States
- Alexander Zhukov - Deputy Prime Minister of Russia and President of the Russian Olympic Committee
- Prince Constantine Alexios of Greece and Denmark, member of the Greek Royal Family, grandson of last Greek king and 1960 Olympian Constantine II
- Frederik, Crown Prince of Denmark (representing the Queen of Denmark)
- Mary, Crown Princess of Denmark
- John Dowling Coates - Member of the International Olympic Committee representing Australia.
- Gerhard Heiberg - Current IOC member representing Norway
- Sir Craig Reedie - Current IOC member representing Great Britain
- Willem-Alexander, Prince of Orange (representing the Queen of the Netherlands)
- Princess Máxima of the Netherlands
- Princess Catharina-Amalia of the Netherlands
- Princess Alexia of the Netherlands
- Princess Ariane of the Netherlands
- Haakon, Crown Prince of Norway, lighter of the cauldron at the Lillehammer Olympics (representing the King of Norway)
- Anne, Princess Royal (representing Elizabeth II, Queen of Canada)
- Jan Fischer, Prime Minister of the Czech Republic
- Jan Peter Balkenende, Prime Minister of the Netherlands
- Mario Pescante - IOC member representing Italy.
- Dmitry Kozak, Deputy Prime Minister of Russia
- Faruk Nafız Özak, Minister of State for Turkey
- Sebastian Coe, head of the London 2012 Organizing Committee
- Tessa Jowell, Minister for the Olympics of the United Kingdom
- David Jacobson, United States Ambassador to Canada
- Valerie Jarrett, Senior Advisor to the President of the United States
- Arnold Schwarzenegger, Governor of California
- Mario Vázquez Raña, President of both the Pan American Sports Organization (PASO) and the Association of National Olympic Committees (ANOC).
- Horst Köhler, President of Germany
- Juan Antonio Samaranch, former president of the IOC
- Maria Teresa Samaranch - President of the Spanish Federation of Sports and daughter of Juan Antonio Samaranch
- Jacques Rogge, President of the IOC
- Dick Pound, Current member of the IOC (Canada) and former head of WADA.
- René Fasel, President of the IIHF
- Leandro Negre, President of the FIH
- Richard Carrión Current IOC member representing, Puerto Rico.
- Nawal El Moutawakel, former Olympic gold medalist and current IOC member representing, Morocco.
- Sam Ramsamy, Current IOC member representing, South Africa.

== Reception ==
=== Media comments ===
- Toronto Star arts critic Richard Ouzounian gave the ceremony a negative review, blasting the proceedings as "an unimaginatively conceived and loosely executed spectacle that promised much and delivered little."
- The New York Times' Charles McGrath described the event as "like New Year's Eve, but a tasteful, well-behaved New Year's Eve", and that it was "authentically and unabashedly Canadian".
- Cleve Dheensaw of the Times-Colonist (Victoria) described the ceremony as "moving and memorable."
- Paul Wells of Maclean's described the event as "sometimes incomprehensible, but sometimes heart-stoppingly beautiful."
- Also from Maclean's, Wayne Gretzky's trip on a truck through downtown Vancouver to the waterfront cauldron was described as a "redneck Popemobile" by writer Scott Feschuk.
- The Ottawa Citizen's Mark Sutcliffe deemed the occasion "tasteful but dull, well-behaved and sometimes thoughtful. You've got Canada nailed." He also found the ceremony lacked a portrayal of contemporary urban Canadian society.
- Nikki Yanofsky's performance of "O Canada" received mixed reactions. McGrath panned the performance as a "power ballad" while Ouzounian deemed it an "uncomfortable alliance of pop and jazz". Conversely, Wells praised the "gorgeously languid" singing while Alex Strachan of Canwest News Service also had a generally positive reaction taking exception only to a "backbeat" in the arrangement. Trevor Payne of the Montreal Jubilation Gospel Choir took issue with the "arrangement and interpretation" of the anthem but also found that Yanofsky was "gifted" in terms of vocal quality.

=== Bilingualism ===
James Moore, the Minister of Canadian Heritage, and Quebec Premier Jean Charest both expressed disappointment in the limited amount of French content during the ceremony. The Canadian Commissioner of Official Languages, Graham Fraser, was of the impression that the event was "developed, perceived and presented in English with a French song." Fraser's office received numerous complaints regarding the ceremony. VANOC, however, defended the case and said that they had made "a very deliberate focus and effort to ensure a strong celebration of Quebec culture and language." They also said that there was a significant amount of French in the opening ceremony. David Atkins said that the ceremonies did celebrate francophone Canada.

=== Multiculturalism ===
There are critics saying that 41% of Metro Vancouver residents are visible minorities yet these groups are mostly absent from the opening ceremony. VANOC CEO John Furlong hints that VANOC would try to address this issue in the closing ceremony.

=== Television ===
The international television audience varied from source. VANOC estimated more than a billion watched the ceremony.

==== North American ratings ====
On both sides of the Canada-US border, this opening ceremony drew high television ratings.

In Canada, this ceremony aired on the CTV Television Network and 10 other channels (all part of a CTV-Rogers media consortium), in a total of 11 languages. The broadcast drew an average of 13.3 million viewers across the country at any given moment, and 23 million Canadians, 69 percent of the national audience, watching at least a portion of the 3.5-hour ceremony. It was, for a period, the most-watched television event in Canadian history; these numbers were surpassed on the final day of the Games by the gold medal game of the Men's hockey tournament, which drew 16.6 million viewers.

South of the border, NBC reported an average of 32.6 million viewers, making it the second-most watched non-United States Winter Olympics, behind the Lillehammer Games in 1994, which drew 33.8 million, and the third most-watched non-United States Olympics, behind the previous one, the Summer Olympics in Beijing two years before (34.2 million) and Lillehammer, and with 67.5 million viewers watching at least a portion of it, it was the most watched non-United States Winter Olympics, and the second-most watched non-United States Olympics, behind Beijing, as that drew 69.9 million viewers.

== Soundtrack ==
Sounds of Vancouver 2010: Opening Ceremony Commemorative Album

Soundtrack album by Various artists
- Released: February 13, 2010
- Genres: Pop, Rock, Classical
- Length: 68:56
- Label: EMI Music Canada
- Producer: David Atkins

2010 Winter Olympics chronology
Canada's Hockey Anthems: Sounds of the Vancouver 2010 Winter Olympic Games (2010)	Sounds of Vancouver 2010: Opening Ceremony Commemorative Album (2010)	Sounds of Vancouver 2010: Closing Ceremony Commemorative Album (2010)

A soundtrack, Sounds of Vancouver 2010: Opening Ceremony Commemorative Album (French: Musique de Vancouver 2010 : L'album commémoratif de la cérémonie d'ouverture des Jeux), was released through the iTunes Store on February 12, 2010, containing many studio recordings of the performances from the opening ceremony. It charted at #6 on the Canadian Albums Chart, and has sold over 50,000 copies. The song performed by Garou, "Un peu plus haut, un peu plus loin (A little higher, a little further)", was released on the accompanying soundtrack for the closing ceremony.

No.	Title	Artist	Length
1.	"Fire on the Mountain"	The 2010 Vancouver Olympic Orchestra	4:20
2.	"Canadian Athletes"	The 2010 Vancouver Olympic Orchestra	1:58
3.	"Bang the Drum"	Bryan Adams & Nelly Furtado	3:48
4.	"O Canada"	Nikki Yanofsky	3:21
5.	"Aboriginal Welcome"	Singers and Drummers of the Four Host Nations	2:53
6.	"Hymn to the North"	The 2010 Vancouver Olympic Orchestra & Donald Sutherland	2:55
7.	"Sacred Grove"	The 2010 Vancouver Olympic Orchestra & Donald Sutherland	2:56
8.	"Ordinary Miracle & Fantasy Ballet"	Sarah McLachlan	6:32
9.	"Rhythms of the Fall"	The 2010 Vancouver Olympic Orchestra	6:19
10.	"Who Has Seen the Wind"	Donald Sutherland	0:54
11.	"Both Sides, Now"	Joni Mitchell	5:27
12.	"Storm"	The 2010 Vancouver Olympic Orchestra	1:54
13.	"Peaks of Endeavour"	The 2010 Vancouver Olympic Orchestra	6:04
14.	"Raising of the Olympic Flag"	The 2010 Vancouver Olympic Orchestra	2:55
15.	"We Are More"	Shane Koyczan	2:06
16.	"Olympic Anthem"	Measha Brueggergosman	4:36
17.	"Parade of Athletes"	The 2010 Vancouver Olympic Orchestra	3:15
18.	"The Olympic Flame"	The 2010 Vancouver Olympic Orchestra	6:43

Chart (2010)	Peak position
Canadian Albums Chart	6
Digital Albums	2

== See also ==
- 2010 Winter Olympics closing ceremony
- 2010 Winter Paralympics opening ceremony
