= Jamie Fox =

Jamie Fox may refer to:

- Jamie Fox (American government official) (1954–2017), American government official and political strategist
- Jamie Fox (Canadian politician) (born 1964)
- Jamie Fox (fiddler), Native American musician

== See also ==
- Jamie Foxx (born 1967), American actor
- Jimmie Foxx (1907–1967), American baseball player
- James Fox (disambiguation)
