= Feschuk =

Feschuk is a surname. Notable people with the surname include:

- Mike Feschuk (1932–2007), Canadian provincial politician
- Scott Feschuk (fl. early 21st century), Canadian speechwriter, humorist, and journalist
