= Isidore Soucy =

Québécois violinist

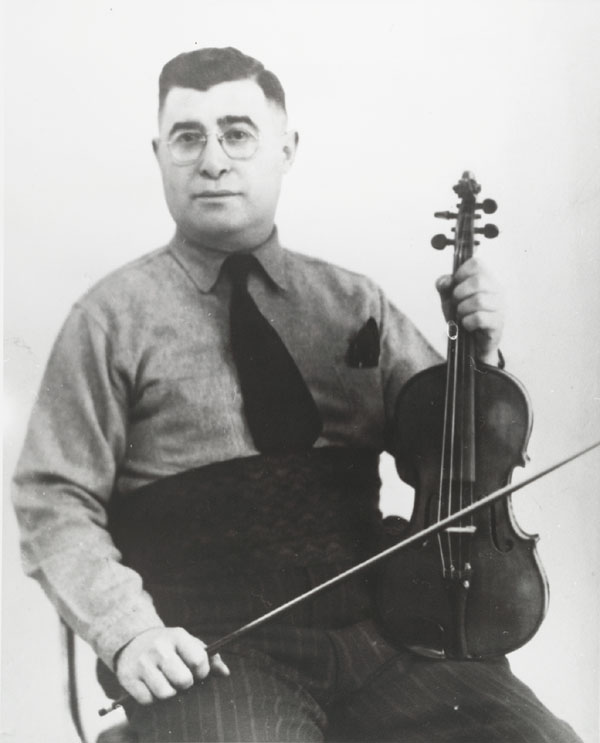
- Soucy c. 1940

Background information
- Born: September 7, 1899; Sainte-Blandine, Rimouski, Canada
- Died: December 7, 1962 (aged 63) Montreal, Quebec, Canada
- Genres: Folk music
- Instrument: Violin
- Works: La Grande Gigue Simple
- Years active: 1928–1962
- Labels: Starr Piano Company; RCA Records; Columbia Records

Isidore Soucy (September 7, 1899 – December 7, 1962) was a Canadian violinist, composer, folklorist, and folk musician. Soucy is best known for his fiddle tune of the traditional Québécois tune, La Grande Gigue Simple.

== Early life ==
Soucy was born on September 7, 1899, in Sainte-Blandine, a neighborhood of Rimouski, Quebec. According to The Canadian Encyclopedia Soucy was noted as being the best fiddler within his hometown.

== Career ==
In 1924 Soucy moved to Montreal where he would work until 1926, that same year he made his first recording for the Starr Piano Company of Richmond, Indiana. During this time Soucy also played fiddle music for CKAC and performed alongside Conrad Gauthier. Beginning in the 1930s Soucy's fiddle music began to be played on more radio stations including CHLP. Soucy was later joined by his wife and children and dubbed "The Famille Soucy" (The Soucy Family). Throughout the 1940s and 1950s Soucy recorded several 78-rpm vinyl records for RCA Records which sold more than 100,000 copies. By 1951 Soucy led the "Trio Soucy" which consisted of himself, his son Fernando, and accordionist René Alain. Soucy continued to play with various groups throughout the 1950s and early 1960s, primarily at local clubs.

== Death ==
Soucy died on December 7, 1962, in Montreal. Fernando would follow in Soucy's footsteps and perform with the Famille Soucy at Expo 67.

== Recordings ==
Soucy's discography includes some 1,200 recordings, most of which were 78-rpm vinyl records via Starr, Columbia Records, MCA Records Canada, and Bluebird Records, others were released under Soucy's own label.

== See also ==
- French-Canadian music
- Culture of Quebec
- Canadian fiddle
- Acadian culture
- Métis fiddle
