= Métis fiddle =

Style of fiddle playing of the Métis people

- Stylistic origins: Jigs, Reels, Strathspey
- Cultural origins: Métis people (Canada), Métis people (United States)
- Typical instruments: Old time fiddle, guitar, drum

Other topics
- Scottish folk music, French-Canadian music

Métis fiddle is the style that the Métis of Canada and Métis in the northern United States have developed to play the violin, solo and in folk ensembles. It is marked by the percussive use of the bow and percussive accompaniment (such as spoon percussion). The Métis people are poly-ethnic post-contact Indigenous peoples. Fiddles were "introduced in this area by Scottish and French-Canadian fur traders in the early 1800s", where the Metis community adopted the instrument into their culture.

== Overview ==
Metis fiddling can be described as the incorporation of First Nations, Scottish, and French-Canadian rhythms, but with a unique Metis beat. David Chartrand (president of the Manitoba Métis Foundation) was interviewed in a 2006 documentary by John Barnard, and emphasizes that the Métis fiddle tradition is an oral tradition which cannot be taught in school. This specific form of fiddling has important musical ties to First Nations, especially Ojibwe, music. Métis fiddling was analyzed by ethno-musicologist Lynn Whidden in the film; she documented that the meter can vary from measure to measure and is very percussive. Players use their feet and choke up on the bow to enable a very sharp "bite". Some players (such as Sierra Noble) play fiddle in a modernized (or blended) Métis style, which incorporates Celtic or country-pop influences. Noble plays Celtic rock fusion in the Sierra Noble Trio, with Ariel Posen on guitar and Bruce Jacobs on bass.

In "A Note on Métis Music", Whidden emphasizes the French chanson and "Indian" derivation of the style, noting that they overlap and have become indistinct. She demonstrates this theme as infusing lyrics as well, as in the song "Redj'Jan's Shoes-White Man's Shoes": "I ain't red nor am I white, I've been like this for all of my life". Citing personal communications, she indicates that nearly everyone in the community played an instrument; gatherings were usually in homes, because of the lack of large buildings; however, she also refers to "weekly" dances.

In 1992, Nicholas Vrooman produced "Plains Chippewa/Metis Music from Turtle Mountain." for Smithsonian Folklore Recordings. This album features Metis Master fiddlers Jimmie LaRocque and Mike Page. In 1997, Smithsonian Folklore Recordings released "Wood That Sings: Indian Fiddle Music of the Americas." This album features Metis Master fiddlers Lawrence 'Teddy Boy' Houle, and Jimmie LaRocque.

== Cultural Significance ==
The Métis are an Indigenous peoples of Turtle Island who trace their descent to mixed European and First Nations parentage. The term was historically a catch-all describing the offspring of any such union; within generations, however, the culture coalesced into what is today a distinct Indigenous group with formal recognition equal to that of the Inuit and First Nations. Mothers were often Cree, Ojibwa, Denesuline or Saulteaux . At one time, distinctions were made between French Métis (born of francophone voyageur fathers) and Anglo Métis (or "Countryborn"), descended from Scottish fathers. Today, these two cultures form a single Métis culture.

The fiddle has become a key feature of Metis identity through the cultural prominence of jigging and social fiddling. Originating from the Red River Region, the Metis fiddle has a similar ethnogenesis as the culture of peoples itself. According to Canadian Geographic, Metis fiddlers are “cultural ambassadors”, but the music's role in legal, political, and cultural considerations is often overlooked. The metis have a notion of Miziksharing, or understanding music as sharing, which informs the social aspects of this community. Because of the mobility and vast kinship networks of the Metis peoples, fiddle music has played a large role in connecting and maintaining both relations and a sense of identity. In this way, Metis fiddle performance allows for the connection of two kinds of sociability that might initially appear to be quite distinct, “musical closeness and interactions between strangers.” Fiddle music is often performed at cultural folk festivals outside of their more intimate community role, where the music draws people together through a “collective identification with Metis heritage.”

These public performances outside of the sphere of the community are not without controversy, though. With the introduction of Metis-style fiddle competitions, in which competitors are to demonstrate “authenticity”, perform without accompaniment and clog while seated, many argue that the Metis tradition is being constrained and held back from innovating. In addition, the Metis-style competitions are offered significantly less prize money; at the Manitoba Open, competitors sought $100 compared to the $400 offered for the top prize in other old-time styles. These competitions are furthermore problematic for allowing individuals to interact with the Metis culture in one specific way, thus avoiding interacting with the indigenous community of Metis people native to Canada.

== Forms ==
The styles documented are European: polka, waltz, twostep, schottische, jig and square dance; however, the steps intermingle with First Nations dances. The chord progressions use complex harmonic structures, abandoning the I-IV-V-I progression of European-derived tunes. Audience hand-clapping, foot-stomping and dancing create an aural accompaniment.

== Repertoire ==
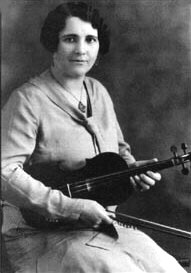
Mary "La" Bolduc, a prominent Canadian folk artist. Though she had European and Indigenous lineage was not Métis. The instrument itself would have been similar to those used by early Metis fiddlers.

Fiddle tunes for dances have been described as the core repertoire of Metis fiddling. The central defining tune is Red River Jig, which is not actually in jig timing (6/8) but often in the faster duple meter(s) associated with reels. A local anecdote relates that "the way to drive a Métis crazy is to nail his moccasins to the floor and play the Red River Jig. The dancing involves prominent footwork as in Irish dance and has been brought to a high level of dexterity. Cory Poitras demonstrates simultaneous fiddle playing and "jigging" at Métis crossing in a 2007 video clip available online.

According to Lederman, this is the same as the "La Grande Gigue Simple" or "La Grandeux" in Québec, which is also found in Cajun playing. Other repertoire she identifies include Arcandsaw Traveller (a Métis version of the American tune Arkansas Traveller), "Drops of Brandy" ("Le Brandy" in Québec), and "Devil's Reel" ("Le Reel du Pendu" in Québec). Other dances include Duck Dance, Square Dance and Drops of Brandy.

== Métis-style fiddle players ==
- John Arcand
- Sierra Noble
- Calvin Vollrath
- Andy de Jarlis
- Patti Kusturok
- Lawrence "Teddy Boy" Houle
- Jamie Fox from Hays, Montana
- Oscar Pelletier

== See also ==
- Red River Jig
- Rendezvous (fur trade)

== Sources ==
- Lederman, Anne, 1987. "Old Native and Métis Fiddling in Manitoba". Vol. L Toronto: Falcon Productions, 783A Queen Street West, M6J 1O1.
- Lederman, Anne. "Old Indian and Métis Fiddling in Manitoba: Origins, Structure, and Questions of Syncretism". Canadian Journal for Traditional Music, 1991 (originally published in The Canadian Journal of Native Studies 7.2 (1988): 205–30).
- "Music of the Indians and Métis" I & n (Kit). Winnipeg: Manitoba Department of Education and Training, Media Productions (1983).
- Whidden, Lynn. "How can you dance to Beethoven? Native people and country music". CUMR, 5, 1984.
- Whidden, Lynn. "Hymn anomalies in traditional Cree song". Recherches Amérindiennes au Québec, vol 15 no 4, 1984.
