= James Fox (disambiguation) =

James Fox (born 1939) is an English actor.

James or Jim Fox may also refer to:

== Arts and entertainment ==
- Jim Fox (composer) (born 1953), American composer
- Jimmy Fox (born 1947), drummer from the band The James Gang
- James Fox (singer) (born 1976), British singer, pianist, and guitarist
- James Fox (art historian) (born 1982), British art historian and broadcaster
- James Fox (journalist) (born 1945), author of White Mischief
- James Fox (filmmaker) (born 1968), English-born American filmmaker

== Government and politics ==
- James Fox (Newfoundland politician) (1817–1883), Canadian politician
- James Augustus Fox (1827–1901), American Alderman and Mayor of Cambridge, Massachusetts
- James Carroll Fox (1928–2019), American federal judge
- James Patrick Fox (1860–1899), Canadian politician
- James Fox (Australian politician) (1886–1951), New South Wales politician

== Sports ==
- Jim Fox (ice hockey) (born 1960), former professional ice hockey player
- Jim Fox (basketball, born 1943), former professional basketball player
- Jim Fox (basketball, born 1973), college basketball head coach for Appalachian State University
- Jim Fox (pentathlete) (1941–2023), British Olympic modern pentathlete
- James Fox (rower) (born 1992), British Paralympic rower

== Other ==
- James J. Fox (born 1940), American born, Australian resident anthropologist of Indonesia
- Jim Fox (Canadian Army officer), Canadian general
- James Fox (engineer) (1780–1830), British engineer, pioneer machine tool maker
- James Fox (prison reform advocate)
- James Alan Fox, American criminologist, professor at Northeastern University

== See also ==
- Jamie Fox (disambiguation)
- Jimmie Foxx (1907–1967), American baseball player
- Jamie Foxx (born 1967), American actor's stage name
