= John Arcand =

Canadian Métis fiddler

- Born: Jean-Baptiste Arcand; July 19, 1942 (age 83); Debden, Saskatchewan, Canada
- Occupation: Musician
- Awards: Order of Canada, Molson Prize
- Website: http://www.johnarcand.com/

Jean Baptiste "John" Arcand, CM (born July 19, 1942, in Jackson Lake, Saskatchewan) is a Canadian fiddler, composer, teacher, and luthier. Arcand has been composing and performing since childhood, having learned the traditional Métis tunes from his father Victor and his grandfather Jean-Baptiste. John Arcand has said, "I knew from childhood I would be a fiddler." "I love the constant challenge because you cannot ever master the fiddle." He is known for the impeccable sense of timing in his music, a skill that is necessary when guiding dancers.

Arcand has been recognized by the Métis community for ensuring that this important tradition survives. Along with a busy performing schedule, John Arcand is active as a guest artist and judge at fiddle contests, is in demand as an instructor at many fiddle camps and with private students, and is also a fiddlemaker and fiddle repairman.

== Life ==
Jean Baptiste Arcand was born to a long line of musicians which can be traced back nine generations. His family roots come from the Métis communities of Red River and Batoche, Saskatchewan. Mr. Arcand was one of 14 children born to parents Victor Arcand and Emma Loyie of Debden, Saskatchewan. He grew up in an environment with dancing and fiddle music, starting to play fiddle at age six. While neither John's father or grandfather composed music, they played traditional Métis tunes such as jigs and reels for dancing. By the age of 12, John was playing for dances in people's homes or at school. During that time, John remembers, "My first fiddle was too long for me, and it only had two strings on it!" John became active as well playing for jiggers, square dancers, round dancers and dance groups. Much of John's childhood was spent working on his family's farm, chopping wood and milking cows. He began working in logging camps at 16, which helped to pay for his first fiddle.

== Career ==
Arcand began his involvement with fiddle contests in 1970, winning the championship class at "Back to Batoche Days" in 1971. He also participated at the Prince Albert Winter Festival fiddle contest and the Western Canadian Amateur Fiddle Championship in Swift Current, Saskatchewan. Arcand has also been a founding member of many Saskatchewan fiddle organizations and dance groups, such as the Deep Lake Stompers (Big River/Debden, Saskatchewan in 1988), the Parkland Fiddlers Association (December 1989-January 2007), and the Saskatchewan Fiddle Committee, a program committee of the Saskatchewan Cultural Exchange Society (October 1990).

Arcand worked as a project coordinator at the Gabriel Dumont Institute in Saskatoon, Saskatchewan in the late 1990s and early 2000s. During that time, he planned and facilitated a collaboration of well-known and respected Metis fiddle players from across Western Canada to gather and preserve their traditional fiddle repertoire. This led to the 2002 anthology called Drops of Brandy and other Traditional Métis Tunes. This is a four CD set containing over 150 fiddle tunes performed by 12 master Metis fiddlers including Gilbert Anderson, Trent Bruner (pianist), Richard Callihoo, Henry Gardipy, Emile Lavallee, Albert 'Hap' Boyer, Garry Lapine, John Arcand, Mel Bedard, Richard Lafferty, Homer Poitras and Ed Lafferty. An accompanying book was also released, with sheet music for every song in the compilation, as well as biographies of the performers, and a detailed look at the history and cultural importance of Metis fiddling.

John Arcand has been a mentor to many Canadian fiddlers over a long career. On March 28, 2003, The National Aboriginal Achievement Award for Arts and Culture was presented to Arcand at the National Arts Centre in Ottawa. He was recognized for his contributions and his commitment to the preservation of Métis fiddling.

The Canadian Grand Masters Fiddling Association also awarded Arcand with the Lifetime Achievement Award in August 2003 when he appeared as the guest artist at this national fiddle competition. Arcand became the first Canadian Metis fiddler to win this award and the first Saskatchewan fiddler to receive this honour. He also performed at the launch of Canada's first web-based Métis radio station.

On May 3, 2007, Arcand became a member of the Order of Canada. He was invested as a member to the order on April 11, 2008.

=== Festivals ===
John Arcand has recorded many albums including an album of Métis fiddle tunes with Calvin Vollrath. With Vollrath, he established the Emma Lake Fiddle Camp, operated by the Saskatchewan Cultural Exchange Society. Famous fiddlers Richard Wood and Patti Kusturok Lamoreux were also teachers at Emma Lake.

The John Arcand Fiddle Fest, held each August on his acreage south of Saskatoon, is attended by fans of fiddle music from around the globe. In 2017 it had its 20th anniversary.

=== Influences ===
Arcand's compositions and musical style have been influenced by Andy DeJarlis. The influence on his compositions can be seen in his recording of several DeJarlis's tunes over the years, as well as his inclusion of a DeJarlis fiddle tune class at his Fiddle Fest in 2005, sponsored by the late Gilbert Anderson of Edmonton, Alberta. Many of Arcand's compositions have a similar sound to DeJarlis's tunes in their use of minors and related rhythmic patterns.

== Compositions ==
Arcand has composed nearly 400 original tunes on his own. Many of these are written for individuals or to honour places he has been. A selected list of tunes by John Arcand includes:

- Big Bear
- Bill Kalyn's Two Step
- The Chicken Reel
- Cutknife Hill
- Dennis Weber Reel
- Don Kurmey's Polka
- Emma's Memorial Waltz
- Fay MacKenzie Two step
- Fiddle Fest Reel
- Fort Pitt Reel
- Fred Muir's Polka
- Gerald White's Memorial Duck Dance
- Gerry Dore Reel
- Harry Daniels
- January Jig
- Lionel's Jig
- Medric (Mederic) McDougall's First Change
- Mel Bedard's First Change
- Memories of Emma Lake
- Old Bone Trail
- Poinsettia Waltz
- Reel de Claquette
- Sugar Hill Road
- Turtle Lake Swing
- Victor Rose's Jig
- Yvon Dumont
- Windy Acres Two Step

== Publications ==
- The Canadian Fiddler, December 2004, Vol. 2, Number 3

=== Discography ===
- #17 (2019)
- A Tribute to Andy Dejarlis (2011)
- Dedications (2009)
- Traditionally Yours (2008)
- Meeyashin (2007)
- Les Michif (2006)
- Vicki and Me...and Some of our Favourites (2005)
- Thru the Years (2005)
- Original and Traditional (2004)
- Celebrating Tradition (2003)
- Echoes of the Prairie (Recorded 1994 - Re-Released 2002)
- Whoa-Ha-Gee (2000)
- Sugar Hill Road (1999)
- The Tunes of the Red River (1998)
- Echoes of the Prairie (1994)
- La Celebration '92 (1992)
- The Road to Batoche, Centennial '85 (1985)

=== Sheet Music ===
- Some of my Original Tunes
- Drops of Brandy and other Traditional Métis Tunes

=== Books ===
- Burton, W., Troupe, C., Arcand, J., & Arcand, V. (2017). Master of the Métis fiddle: John Arcand, the man, the music, the festival.

=== Films ===
- Meeches, L., Arcand, J., Vollrath, C., Howe, D., & Meeches Video Productions, Inc. (2005). Crooked music: John Arcand, the master of the Métis fiddle. Winnipeg, Man.: Meeches Video Productions.
- John Arcand and His Métis Fiddle, Métis Fiddlers Series.

== Awards ==
- One of twenty seven to represent Western Canada at the Fiddles of the World Conference in Halifax (1999)
- The Lifetime Achievement Award from the Canadian Grand Masters for his "Outstanding Contribution to Old Time Fiddling" (2003)
- The National Aboriginal Achievement Award for Arts and Culture (2003)
- Saskatchewan Lieutenant Governor's Arts Award (2004)
- The Saskatchewan Centennial Medal (2005)
- The City of Saskatoon's Cultural Diversity and Race Relations "Living in Harmony" Award (2006)
- The Order of Canada (presented by Governor General Michaelle Jean) (2008)
- The Queen's Diamond Jubilee Medal (2012)
- The Canada Council Molson Prize (2014)

== See also ==
- Music of Canada
- List of Canadian musicians
