= Calvin Vollrath =

Canadian Métis fiddler (born 1960)

- Born: 16 May 1960 (age 66)
- Citizenship: Canadian
- Occupation: Musician
- Known for: Metis fiddle
- Website: calvinvollrath.com

Calvin Vollrath (born 16 May 1960) is a Canadian fiddler and composer and is one of the few European-Canadian fiddle players playing professionally in the Métis style. He lives in St. Paul, Alberta.

Vollrath won the Grand North American Old Time Fiddle Championship in 1985 and 1998. In more recent years, he has judged the Canadian Grand Masters Fiddle Competition, and was awarded a Lifetime Achievement Award from the Canadian Grand Masters Fiddling Association in 2005. He participated as an instructor at the Emma Lake Fiddle Camp from its beginnings in 1990 until its final year of operation at Arlington Beach, Saskatchewan in 2008. He has played with various other musicians including John Arcand. Some of his music is jazz-like while some tunes and influences come from the Métis tradition and other musical styles including French Canadian, Scottish, Irish and contemporary pop music. He is an inspiration and a mentor to many Canadian fiddlers, including April Verch, Patti Kusturok, and Samantha Robichaud. The late Cape Breton fiddler Jerry Holland composed a tune in Calvin's honour, named "Calvin, Fiddler's Idol". Calvin has represented Canadian music internationally, such as at the World Music Expo in Berlin in 2000. He became the first fiddler to play at an NHL hockey game when the Edmonton Oilers invited him to play during the Stanley Cup Finals in 1988. He has made recordings with musicians such as Ian Tyson, George Fox, Colleen Peterson, and Laura Vinson. CBC's documentary program Adrienne Clarkson Presents (hosted by Adrienne Clarkson) broadcast a program about Métis fiddling that featured Calvin Vollrath and John Arcand.

He composed and performed five fiddle tunes for the 2010 Winter Olympics Opening Ceremony.

== Life ==
Calvin Vollrath's love for music began at an early age with his father, Art "Lefty" Vollrath, who was raised near Barrhead, Alberta. His father's family included five brothers who played fiddle. His father developed his own reputation as a great fiddler in the Edmonton area and passed on the family tradition to Calvin. When Calvin was young, he used to mimic his father with two butter knives. Calvin was raised on the Don Messer's Jubilee and received his first fiddle at age eight. It was soon apparent to many that Calvin was a natural talent on the fiddle. At 13, he entered his first fiddle contest and began winning the championship classes of various fiddle contests at age 17.

== Career ==
In 1982, Vollrath joined the Clearwater Band playing swing, jazz and country music, honing his abilities as a backup fiddler. In 1983 he joined Edmonton country singer Danny Hooper and his band moved on to join the Jess Lee Band in 1988 and moved to Vancouver in the process. He later performed with the four piece band Wheel Hoss upon returning to Edmonton, Alberta. In 1988, he began teaching at the Emma Lake Fiddle Camp and has since taught at various fiddle camps in Canada and the United States, as well as given fiddle workshops at various performance levels throughout Canada, the United States, Norway, Sweden, Finland and Great Britain, as well as online through his personal website. He started his own recording studio while in Edmonton, and named it Astromonical Studios upon moving to St. Paul, Alberta in 1998. He also plays acoustic guitar and bass as well as backup fiddle for various projects through his studio.

Calvin Vollrath has composed nearly 700 tunes and released more than 70 albums, along with numerous music books and an instructional DVD.

He wrote the theme for the international fiddle convention 'Fiddles of the World', held in Halifax, Nova Scotia in July 1999.

Calvin Vollrath was also commissioned to compose five fiddle tunes for the Vancouver Winter Olympics Opening Ceremonies in 2010. The tunes were meant to represent the various styles of fiddling Canada has to offer.

== Awards ==
=== Fiddle ===
- Grand North American Fiddle Champion (1985, 1998)
- Induction into the North American Fiddlers' Hall of Fame on 31 July 2011.
- Lifetime Achievement Award’ from The Canadian Grand Masters Fiddling Championship (August 2005), in recognition and appreciation of his outstanding contribution to Old Time Fiddling.

=== Promotion and performance of country music ===
- 'Lifetime Achievement Award' from the Alberta Men of Country Music (AMOCM) in 2007
- 'Bev Munro Award' in 2009, sponsored by the Association of Canadian Country Music Legends

=== Civic honours ===
In 2016, Calvin had his name dedicated to St. Paul’s welcome sign on the east and west ends of the town.

== Discography ==
- Special Delivery (2021)
- 20/20 Fiddlin'-Calvin Vollrath and Friends Volumes 1 and 2 (2020)
- The Gift (2019)
- The Old Wagon Wheel (2018)
- Me, Myself & I (2017)
- A Fiddle of This, A Fiddle of That (2016)
- Fiddle Lickin' Good (2016)
- TGIF (2016)
- 'Approved' Canadian Fiddler (2015)
- 'Certified' Canadian Fiddler (2015)
- The Journey (2014)
- Vintage Vollrath (2014)
- Unmistakable (2013)
- Super'CALiFIDDLE'istic (2013)
- Spring Creek (2012)
- The Homecoming (2012)
- Fiddle Nation (2011)
- Dancing Northern Lights (2010)
- 50 (2009)
- Fiddle (2008)
- Looking Back, 25 Years of Recording (2007)
- The Big C (2006)
- The Big C02 (2006)
- Air Mail Special (2005)
- Strings of Pearl (2005)
- Métis Style Fiddle (2005)
- Car Tunes (2004)
- Just for the Swing of It (2004)
- New Fiddle Classics (2003)
- Maple Sugar and Other Old Time Favorites (2003)
- Friendship (2002)
- Calvin Vollrath Waltzes (2002)
- Fiddle According to Cal (2002)
- Autumn in Vermont (2001)
- Uncommon Sense (2001)
- Fiddling My Way (2001)
- This Old Tune (2001)
- Live, From Our Place (2001)
- Fiddillennium, Volume 1 (2000)
- Fiddillennium, Volume 2 (2000)
- Steppin' Out (2000)
- Precious Melodies (2000)
- Old Time Dance Party (1999)
- UFO Sessions 99 (1999)
- Bonjour comment ça va (1999)
- Let it Jig, Let it Jig, Let it Jig (1999)
- Thanks to Emma (1998)
- Jiggin' at the OK Corral (1998)
- Tamarack'r Down (1997)
- 20 of my Favorites (1996)
- Instrumentally Yours: Somethin' Different (1995)
- Live From Calvin's Kitchen (1995)
- Métis Old Time Dance Tunes (1995)
- Red River Trails (1995)
- Cracklin' Fire (1994)
- Too Close For Comfort (1994)
- Wild Alberta Rose (1993)
- Cat Gut Boogie (1993)
- New & Used (1989)
- Fiddlin' Again (1984)
- Red River Jig & Other Old Time Fiddle Favorites (1983)
- The Reel Thing (1981)

Vollrath also has had many more sessions with various country artists, including live sessions from the Emma Lake Fiddle Camp and recordings with various musicians.
