= Scott Reid (political advisor) =

Canadian political advisor

- Education: Queen's University
- Occupations: political analyst and commentator
- Employer(s): CTV News, Newstalk 1010AM
- Known for: served as Advisor and Director of Communications in the Prime Minister's Office of Canadian Prime Minister Paul Martin

Scott Reid is a political analyst and commentator currently working for CTV News, Newstalk 1010AM and writing columns for a variety of news organizations including the Ottawa Citizen, CBC.ca, Macleans and others. He is a former political advisor, having served as Advisor and Director of Communications in the Prime Minister's Office of Canadian Prime Minister Paul Martin. Along with Macleans columnist Scott Feschuk, he also owns and operates Feschuk.Reid, a strategic communications and speechwriting consultancy.

== Biography ==
Ahead of the 2006 Canadian federal election, Reid came under heavy criticism after attacking a Conservative Party of Canada policy proposal to directly give families funding for childcare, declaring that "don't give people 25 bucks a week to blow on beer and popcorn." He later apologised for the statement. The quote was cited by some commentators as one of the decisive moments of the 2006 election, contributing to a perception of the Liberal Party as out-of-touch elitists and to their eventual defeat.

In 2006, Reid teamed up with Maclean's award-winning magazine columnist Scott Feschuk to found Feschuk.Reid, a communications consultancy dedicated to strategic and corporate communications, speechwriting and executive counsel. Feschuk.Reid has served a wide number of high-profile clients including Royal Bank of Canada, Bank of Montreal, BlackRock, Caisse de dépôt, FedEx, Microsoft, TELUS, Magna, Greyhound, Maple Leaf Foods, Enbridge, Hydro One and other private, public and not-for-profit clients.

In 2011, Reid joined CTV as a co-anchor for the National Affairs business and politics program on CTV News Channel. Reid appears regularly as a commentator on CTV, CBC and TSN, in addition to writing for the Globe and Mail, Ottawa Citizen and Macleans.ca.

Reid's son currently works for the Prime Minister of Canada.
