= James Fox (Australian politician) =

Australian politician

James Fox (11 February 1886 – 22 May 1951) was an English-born Australian politician.

He was born at Oldham to stovemaker John Thomas Fox and Elizabeth Tetlow. He migrated to New South Wales and lived at Alexandria, where he became a stovemaker and was active in the Stovemakers' Union. On 30 March 1918 he married Lydia Heness, with whom he had one son. From 1931 to 1934 he was a Labor member of the New South Wales Legislative Council. Secretary of the Stovemakers' Union from 1931 to 1944, he was also an Alexandria alderman from 1934 to 1948, serving as Deputy Mayor in 1937. Fox died at Waterloo in 1951.
