= Canadian stepdance =

Form of European-style stepdance popular in the Canadian maritimes

Canadian stepdance refers to several related forms of percussive stepdance in Canada with European origins including France, Ireland and Scotland. Canadian stepdancing involves percussive dancing to "Celtic" tunes, usually played by fiddle. Percussive sounds are created through a combination of foot movements such as heel taps, toe taps, and shuffles, all designed to accentuate the music. Canadian stepdance is normally danced in a small space with limited lateral movement. Upper-body postures in Canadian stepdancing are typically relaxed but upright, allowing occasional arm movements that flow with the rhythm of the dance, or hands on hips.

== Traditional stepdance styles ==
Stepdance steps vary according to the "Celtic" tune type played, such as jigs, reels, strathspeys, clogs, hornpipes, two-steps, and polkas. A reel, the most common tune type in Canadian stepdance, is played in 4/4 time, and is fun, fast and lively. A jig, also quite popular, is played in 6/8 time and sounds like an energetic march. The clog is slower, danced in half time, and is considered to be a more graceful dance.

== Canadian stepdance by region ==
There are numerous Canadian stepdance styles found in different regions of Canada.

Cape Breton stepdance is unique to the Cape Breton Island region of Nova Scotia, brought there by large numbers of Scottish Gaelic settlers who arrived in the late eighteenth and early nineteenth centuries.

French Canadian or Quebecois stepdance originates from the lumber camps and villages of Quebec, taking influence from Irish and Breton dance.

Ottawa Valley stepdance, found in the Ottawa Valley, features variable, aggressive steps danced high off the floor, and flowing arm movements. Ottawa Valley style originated in the lumber camps, as a way of leisure after the day's hard work. Curiously, it has incorporated tap dance elements.

There is also a Newfoundland stepdance style, and Métis stepdance style (known as "jigging").

=== Cape Breton Stepdance ===
The style of Cape Breton stepdancing originated in the Scottish Highlands and Western Islands, with the large numbers of Scottish Gaels that left their ancestral homeland in great numbers, to settle on Cape Breton Island, which is now part of the province of Nova Scotia, Canada. Large waves of Gaelic immigration happened all throughout the 18th-20th centuries, sometimes by force of their landlords, and other times voluntarily, in hopes of establishing a better life and cultural freedom.

Often whole communities would come over either together, or in a pattern of chain migration, in order to preserve their language, and unique cultural practices and identity. One of these features is the Gaels' love of music and dance. Cape Breton step dancing emerged from solo step dances, which were likely not originally percussive in nature. These solo dances were the precursor to what would become the lively percussive steps now pictured at the mention of “Cape Breton stepdance.” The popular percussive steps brought over to Cape Breton by these Gaels continues to be passed on generationally, primarily in the home, and this informal style of transmission was able to continue on the island well into the twentieth century, until around the nineteen seventies, when formal classes started to become a more common transmission method, alongside the tradition of learning from family and neighbours.

While the style of step dancing brought to Cape Breton with the early Highland Gaelic settlers, known now as Cape Breton stepdancing in its own right, was passed on and preserved in the New World, the tradition managed to die out in the Highlands and Islands of Scotland (though it has since been re-introduced), making it a unique element of Cape Breton culture.

== See also ==
- Jig
