= Jamie Fox (fiddler) =

Native American musician

Jamie Fox is a Native American musician of the Assiniboine and Gros Ventre people, who is a well-known performer of the Métis fiddle tradition of Montana.

Jamie Fox is a member of the Fox family of fiddlers from the Fort Belknap reservation. She has performed widely in the United States and Europe, where she has collaborated with her husband, Kristian Bugge, a Danish traditional fiddler, and also with old-time fiddler Ruthie Dornfeld.

Fox studied with Montana fiddler Marvin "Fatty" Morin and learned his bowing technique.
