= Red River Jig =

Canadian traditional dance and tune

The Red River Jig is a traditional dance and accompanying fiddle tune, culturally relevant to both the Canadian Métis and the First Nations. The dance’s performers and fiddlers currently and historically includes individuals identifying as First Nations, French Canadian, or Scottish Canadians, as well as others involved in the expansive 19th century fur trade. The origins of the dance can be traced to traditional dances of the First Nations, French, English, Scots, and Orcadian peoples, from whom the Métis Nation descended. The name is also in reference to the Red River of the North, which forms the border between North Dakota and Minnesota (USA) and flows north through Winnipeg, Manitoba, Canada before emptying into Hudson Bay.

"Jigging", as commonly referred to by the Métis people, has observable similarities to the traditional dances of Quebec and the Canadian Maritime communities of British Isles heritage. The Métis fiddle tune of the same name is not actually a jig per se, but is rather a reel.

== History ==
In 1867, Alexander Begg wrote the first published account of the Red River Jig and its tune. Oral accounts date the practice as having historical roots as far back as the 1830s in the Northern Plains of Saskatchewan. Embedding itself into the socio-economic culture of the Métis people, the Red River Jig was also colloquially referred to as the Métis National Anthem, although this definition by synonym was never officially recognized by an authoritative body.

The popularity of the traditional dance was bolstered by the extensive and well connected fur trade, which served to transport both goods and culture throughout the region. This realized political value of the Red River Jig was thanks in part to its use as a negotiating tool between chief factors and fur trade clerks, which was considered to be the result of the fur trade's increasing economic dependency upon the positive development of relative social and cultural interactions.

The high visibility of the Red River Jig has provided helpful evidence pointing to the existence of a long and vibrant Métis culture. While this promotion has helped to establish broader visibility of Métis culture in general, critiques can be made that the sole attention paid to the Red River Jig contributes to the loss of epistemological diversity due to its lack of recognition for related practices that exist within the variety of Métis cultures.

== Performance ==
Despite the complexity of the dance itself, fur trade clerks would often take it upon themselves to learn the Red River Jig and perform alongside their trading counterparts in a show of friendship and cultural acceptance. As a result of the emotional intensity derived from viewing the competitive performance between the traditionally male dancers, the dance contributed to the perception of a competitive environment which helped bolster the subsequent trading that occurred.

Contemporary interpretations of the Red River Jig have included solo performances, which provides an opportunity for individuals to demonstrate their highly technical stepping patterns and freestyle jigging abilities. During public performances at exhibitions and festivals, the audience is often encouraged to participate by dancing in place.

== See also ==
- Jig
- Step dance
- Contra dance
- Scottish highland dance
- Rendezvous (fur trade)
