= Patti Kusturok =

- Other name: Patti Lamoureux
- Occupation: Musician
- Years active: 1985-present
- Known for: Fiddle
- Children: Alex Kusturok
- Honours: Canadian Grand Masters Fiddle Champion, Inductee in the North American Fiddlers Hall of Fame
- Website: https://www.pattikusturok.com/home

Patti Kusturok (Lamoureux) (/ˈkʌstəˌrɒk/ KUS-tə-rok) is a Canadian fiddler, performer, teacher, and composer who is known as "Canada's old-time fiddling sweetheart." She resides in Winnipeg, Manitoba where she teaches fiddling. She is a Red River Métis citizen. She performs frequently in addition to teaching at workshops and music camps each summer. She has taught at the Emma Lake Fiddle Camp, Shivering Strings Fiddle Camp in Winnipeg, and Falcon Lake Fiddle Camp. Her son, Alex Kusturok, is also a Canadian Grand Master Fiddle Champion.

Kusturok began playing fiddle at age four according to the Suzuki Method. Her playing is characterized by a pulsating, rhythmical lilt and often referred to as one of the "smoothest fiddle players in North America." Patti has attributed her playing style to having a loose bowing wrist and allowing her fingers to move on the bow as she is playing. Her style is described as part Métis and part Québecois. Her musical influences include Calvin Vollrath, Reg Bouvette and Graham Townsend. Lamoureux explained to CBC SCENE host Bruce Ladan (CBC Manitoba) that she has learned a lot about playing the fiddle by teaching it. After she mastered the instrument, she started teaching when she was 16 years old, taking over for her teacher when he retired. "Being kind of a natural player and not having trouble learning, it was great to learn that other people don't always learn that way," she recalled. "So I learned how to teach by teaching. People would ask me why my bowing arm was so smooth. I had to analyze how I gripped it, as well as the pressure, that kind of thing." In 2015 she published 365 videos of herself playing a new fiddle tune every day in an event called "Patti Kusturok's 365 Days of Fiddle Tunes." In 2019, Kusturok published an additional 365 videos of herself playing a new fiddle tune every day in an event titled "2019-Patti Kusturok's 365 Days of Fiddle Tunes."

== Awards ==
- Canadian Junior Fiddle Champion (1985)
- 3 time Champion at the Pembroke, ON fiddle competition
- 6 time Manitoba Fiddle Champion
- 3 time Grand North American Champion
- Canadian Grand Masters Fiddling Championship in Ottawa, ON (1994, 1995, 1996). Kusturok was the first woman in the history of Canada to win the Canadian Grand Masters Fiddling Championship and the very first winner from Western Canada.
- Induction into the Manitoba Fiddle Association Hall of Fame (2010)
- Induction into the North American Fiddlers' Hall of Fame (July 31, 2016)

== Albums ==
Year	Album
1981	Fiddle Fingers
1983	Cross Canada Fiddling
1984	Bowing the Strings
1985	Prairie Fire
1987	A Touch of Heritage
1988	The King and the Princess (with Reg Bouvette)
1993	More Old Time Fiddling
1994	20 Years of Fiddling. Vol. 1
1994	20 Years of Fiddling. Vol. 2
1997	Stringin' Them Along
2000	Y2Kusturok
2001	I'm Not Done Yet
2006	Encore
2008	Once More... With Feel...
2010	Plums in the Cooler
2012	100% Danceable
2014	Milestone
2018	Momentum
