= Step dance =

Term for dance styles in which footwork is the most important

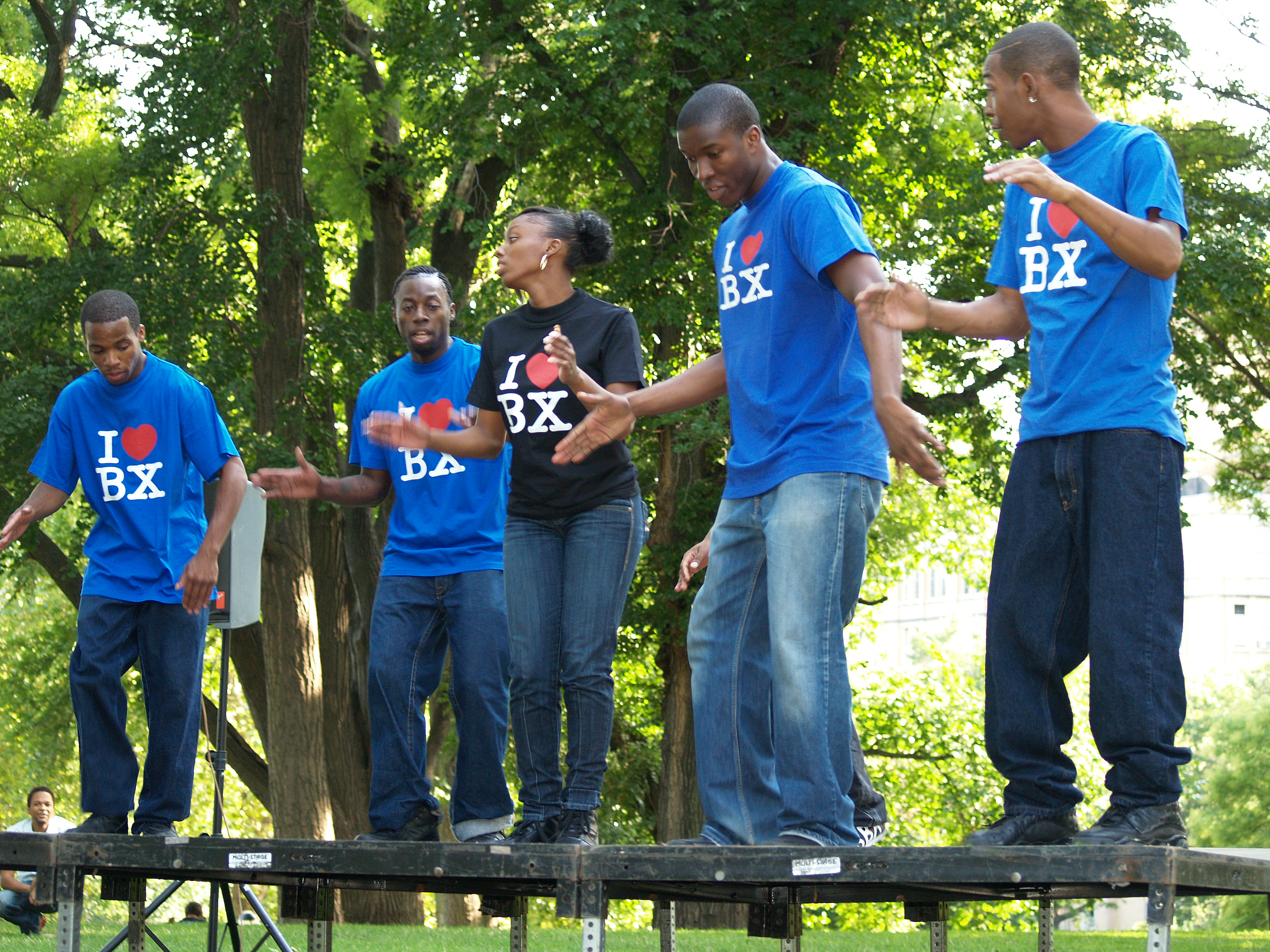
The Bronx's P.L.A.Y.E.R.S. Club Steppers

Demonstration of a simple step

Step dance is a generic term for dance styles in which footwork is considered to be the most important part of the dance and arm movements and styling are either restricted or considered less relevant.

Step-dancing is a percussive form of dance that employs hard-soled shoes and may be synchronized with music played at a specified tempo using instruments like pipes, whistles, fiddles, or puirt-a-beul (mouth music). It entails producing rhythmic beats through intricate and diverse footwork, involving striking heels, toes, and feet, all the while ensuring impeccable timing with the musical rhythms found in strathspey, reel, and jig compositions.

The terminology used in percussive dance styles reflects a wide range of naming conventions, highlighting both shared features and unique distinctions. The umbrella term "percussive dance" encompasses dance forms where the foot serves as an intentional source of rhythmic sound, akin to a percussion instrument. The specific footwear associated with each style contributes to variations within this genre.

== African-American stepping ==
Stepping has African roots and is an African American traditional dance style. Popularized by National Pan-Hellenic Council, dancers such as members of fraternities and sororities join in steps—elaborate synchronized group routines that are performed in competitions called "step shows". Step shows incorporate cheerleading, military, and drill-team moves, especially the call-and-response element inherent in those forms. These aspects are not only important to the energy of stepping for entertainment use but also for bonding and pride within their organizations.

== Cape Breton step dance ==
The traditional Cape Breton step dance, reminiscent of the style brought by 19th-century Scottish immigrants, is characterized by its exceptional precision. Throughout the dance, the feet stay close to the floor, executing each step with unwavering accuracy, ensuring no beats are missed. The repertoire consists of concise, symmetrical steps, with each foot taking precise positions. In contrast, contemporary Cape Breton step dance blends influences from various styles such as Irish, tap, Acadian, and Ottawa Valley step dance. These modern versions depart from the traditional precision, incorporating "offbeat" steps that don't strictly adhere to a four or eight-bar musical phrase. Additionally, asymmetrical elements introduce subtle divergences between the movements of each foot, deviating from the mirrored actions seen in the conventional dance form. The Cape Breton step dance is distinguished by its unique musical accompaniment, particularly the exceptional rendition of the strathspey performed skillfully by acclaimed Cape Breton fiddlers like Carl MacKenzie and Howie MacDonald. The heart of Cape Breton step dancing is closely linked to the captivating interplay of the "drive and the lift" inherent in the Cape Breton strathspey. What sets this dance apart from similar step dances globally is the incorporation of the Cape Breton-style strathspey, a musical expression less commonly found in other Celtic regions where jigs and reels are more prevalent. In present-day Cape Breton step dance, the vibrant melodies of the fiddle, accompanied by the piano, play a central role, marking a shift from an earlier period when the dance tradition was primarily influenced by the piping tradition.

== Clog dancing ==
Step dancing includes clog dancing in which the steps are performed by performers wearing clogs. The sound of the clogs against a hard surface produces a characteristic sound which is an important element of the dance.

== Irish step dance ==
Irish stepdance is a widespread form of step dance. The earliest feis, or competition, occurred in 1897. It descends from traditional Irish dance, but global popularity of the Riverdance troupe significantly altered its competitive form from traditional Irish standards. Both traditional and more modern competitive styles are characterized by the use of specific shoes and by costumes that can be remarkably elaborate. Irish stepdance is, as of 2017, the only form of step dance to which a Broadway production, Lord of the Dance, has been devoted.

== Other forms of step dance ==
Tap dancing is a modern form of step dancing taking its influence from a variety of older step-forms.

A traditional form of individual step dancing is still found in certain areas of England such as East Anglia and Dartmoor. This style of dance is commonly performed informally in pubs to traditional folk tunes, with dancers often bringing a wooden board to dance on.

Step dancing ("stomping") can also be found in other countries such as Malambo from Argentina and Zapateado from Mexico.

== See also ==
- Canadian stepdance
- Dabke
- Jig
