= Scott Feschuk =

Scott Feschuk is a Canadian speechwriter, humorist and former newspaper journalist.

His journalism career began at The Globe and Mail. After five years as a TV and political columnist for the National Post, he left the newspaper in 2004 to become chief speechwriter for then Prime Minister Paul Martin.

After working for a year or so on the writing staff of the CBC Television show This Hour Has 22 Minutes, he wrote the books Searching for Michael Jackson's Nose and How Not to Completely Suck as a New Parent and currently writes a humour column in the Canadian magazine Maclean's and a blog on the Maclean's website.

During the 2006 federal election, Feschuk wrote a popular daily blog about life on the campaign trail. After the Liberal defeat in the election, he formed a speechwriting company called Feschuk.Reid, along with Scott Reid, one of Prime Minister Martin's senior advisors.

He has written extensively on television and film. One time, after the Oscars, Faye Dunaway mistook him for a valet and ordered him to find her limo.

He was formerly the editor of the Gazette at the University of Western Ontario. His younger brother Dave is a sportswriter for the Toronto Star.
