= Andy de Jarlis =

- Birth name: Andrew Joseph Patrice Ephreme Desjarlais
- Born: 29 September 1914; Woodridge, Manitoba, Canada
- Died: 18 September 1975 (aged 60); Saint Boniface, Manitoba, Canada
- Genres: Folk
- Instrument: violin
- Labels: Bert Records; London; Quality; Sunshine Records (Canada)
- Formerly of: Andy Dejarlis and His Early Settlers; Leftover Salmon; Red River Mates

Andy de Jarlis (1914 – 1975) was a Canadian Métis fiddler from Woodridge, Manitoba. He was credited with more than 200 musical compositions. He played on Winnipeg radio accompanied by the musical group the Red River Mates. He moved to Vancouver and later to Montreal, where he appeared on the television program Don Messer's Jubilee as Andy Dejarlis and His Early Settlers.

== Biography ==
De Jarlis was born Andrew Joseph Patrice Ephreme Desjarlais on 29 September 1914, in Woodridge, Manitoba, to father Pierre. He came from a family of Métis fiddlers and began playing at age 15. Pierre Falcon, often called the "Red River Bard", was one of his ancestors. He was known to have scored more than 200 musical compositions "to his credit (jigs, reels, polkas and waltzes) as well as 38 records." He played on Winnipeg radio accompanied by the musical group the Red River Mates. He moved to Vancouver and later to Montreal where he appeared on the television program Don Messer's Jubilee as Andy Dejarlis and His Early Settlers.

De Jarlis died 18 September 1975 in Saint Boniface, Manitoba, Canada.

== Discography ==
- The Manitoba Golden Boy
- Red River Echoes
- Red River Echoes, Vol. 2
- Square Dance with Andy Dejarlis
- Andy Dejarlis and His Early Settlers
- Old Time Waltzes
- Let's Do The Two-steps
- Andy Dejarlis's Favourite Old Time Tunes
- Jolly Old Time Music with Andy Dejarlis
- Et domino les femmes ont Chaud
- Chainez les hommes - chainez les femmes (Chain the men - chain the women)
- Tour de valse avec Andre Dejarlis et son ensemble
- Original Old-Time Music
- Good Old Time Music
- Square Dance With Calls
- Canadian Old Time Music
- Andy's Centennial Album
- Backwoods Fiddle Tunes
- Fiddling Varieties
- Polka Time
- The Happy Old Days
- Travelling West
- Waltzing at Its Best
- Back Again

== See also ==
- Music of Canada
- List of Canadian musicians
