= List of The Patty Duke Show episodes =

The Patty Duke Show is an American television sitcom starring Patty Duke, William Schallert, Jean Byron, Paul O'Keefe and Eddie Applegate that originally ran on the American Broadcasting Company (ABC) from September 18, 1963 to April 27, 1966.

== Series overview ==
Season	Episodes	Originally released	
Season	Episodes	First released	Last released
1	36	September 18, 1963	May 20, 1964
2	36	September 16, 1964	May 19, 1965
3	32	September 15, 1965	April 27, 1966

== Episodes ==
=== Pilot ===
The unaired pilot episode was filmed at Metro-Goldwyn-Mayer Studios in Culver City, California, with San Francisco as the setting for the series. Mark Miller played Martin Lane and Charles Herbert played Ross Lane, but in the episode "The Cousins," William Schallert and Paul O'Keefe played their respective roles; this is also the first of John McGiver's five appearances in the series, guest-starring as J.R. Castle, Martin and Kenneth's boss at The New York Daily Chronicle (he later returns in the episodes "The Elopement," "The Christmas Present," "Auld Lang Syne" and "The Cousins"). San Francisco locations were also used in many scenes.

No.	Title	Original release date
0	"Pilot"	Unaired
Patty Lane's European cousin, Cathy Lane (Patty Duke in a dual role), comes to the United States to live with the Lane family.

=== Season 1 (1963–64) ===
No. overall	No. in season	Title	Directed by	Written by	Original release date	Prod. code
1	1	"The French Teacher"	William Asher	Sidney Sheldon	September 18, 1963	1003
Patty tries to pass off Cathy's report card as her own. Martin learns Patty isn't doing well in school and especially in her French class. She blames her teacher being preoccupied with getting married. Patty goes to school the next day and finds herself instantly attracted to the substitute French teacher, Andre Malon. After class Patty's boyfriend Richard Harrison (Eddie Applegate) tries talking to her, but she is in a daze. She starts to take her French studies very seriously. Patty even skips going to a movie with her family. Andre mentions to Patty that he had a fight with Louise, his fiancée in France, and that is why he came to the U.S. to teach. Patty asks what Louise was like. Patty tries to act more mature and stops talking to Richard. Richard asks Cathy why Patty is avoiding him. After Patty tells Andre that she loves him, Andre goes to speak with Martin. They try to come up with a plan to let Patty down easy. Andre decides to act much older, hoping this will change Patty's mind about him. But that plan backfires. Andre tells Martin that they need to think of something as Louise is coming to join him. It's Cathy that actually comes up with a way for Patty to forget about Andre. Note: This is Jean-Pierre Aumont's only appearance in the series, guest-starring as Andre Malon; this episode also serves as the series premiere.
2	2	"The Genius"	William Asher	Sidney Sheldon	September 25, 1963	1002
Natalie is upset with Patty because she hasn't been doing her homework or chores. Plus, she's been taking advantage of Cathy. Patty's teacher Miss Morgan (Hildy Parks) introduces the class to Mr. Snell of the National Educational Testing Survey. He has been going to schools across the country giving computerized intelligence tests. The machine is asking Patty questions faster than she can answer them. She tries to slow it down and inadvertently alters the IQ test. Miss Morgan and Mr. Snell arrive at the Lane household and tell the family that Patty has been categorized as a genius. They find it hard to believe. Mr. Snell suggests they give Patty anything she wants to open up her creativity. Martin checks up on Snell's organization and finds it to be quite reputable. The family tells Patty she can pretty much have and do anything she wants. Mr. Snell puts Patty in a class with other genius students. Patty asks Martin if he believes that she is a genius and he says he does. Patty starts to enjoy the special treatment she is receiving. Mr. Snell comes to learn that Patty manipulated the computer to give her such a high score. He informs the family and they bring Patty back down to earth. Note: This is Paul Lynde's only appearance in the series, guest-starring as Mr. Snell.
3	3	"The Elopement"	William Asher	Sidney Sheldon	October 2, 1963	1005
The family are planning a surprise vacation for Martin. Natalie has pretty much set everything up. At the office, Martin tells J.R. Castle that teenage marriages are increasing. Martin blames the parents. Patty and Richard are at the License Bureau to get a fishing license for the trip. J.R. sees them there and hears them talking about a cabin. J.R. tells Martin that he thinks they're going to sneak off and get married. J.R. says that Martin needs to handle this carefully. After Martin talks to Cathy, he becomes even more suspicious. Martin and J.R. overhear Natalie talking about the trip with Patty and Richard. Martin now believes that the whole family is trying to hide the elopement from him. Martin hopes to scare Richard out of marriage, but Richard doesn't quite understand what Martin is talking about. Martin has a talk with Natalie about secrets and she says that sometimes secrets are a good thing. A Mr. Landers comes by with the keys to the cabin and speaks with Martin. Martin manages to cancel the cottage and makes sure his car is unavailable for the weekend. Martin confronts the family about the elopement and Natalie at first plays along. When he sees the fishing license, Martin learns about the surprise vacation. John Marriott as License Clerk. Note: This is the second of John McGiver's five appearances in the series, guest-starring as J.R. Castle, Martin and Kenneth's boss at The New York Daily Chronicle.
4	4	"The House Guest"	William Asher	Sidney Sheldon	October 9, 1963	1007
Uncle Kenneth, Cathy's father, calls from Paris. He informs the family that crotchety Aunt Pauline (Ilka Chase) is coming to the Lane household for her annual visit. She will be there just for dinner. Ross mentions how wealthy Pauline is. Martin reminds him that she has willed her money to charity. The family brings out all of Pauline's presents that they store in the basement. Pauline arrives and is immediately condescending. Pauline tells the family that she will be moving in for a while. Pauline brings a cat with her and the family has to figure out what to do with their dog, Tiger. The family is not thrilled with the dinner that Pauline cooked. That night, the family sneaks into the kitchen to get something to eat and Pauline catches them. She makes quite a few changes in the household that no one is happy about. Aunt Pauline has a confrontation with Cathy over the way her father has been raising her. Cathy loses her temper and tells off Pauline, who then leaves the house. Cathy feels terrible about what happened and Martin tries to make her feel better. Cathy goes to the hotel to apologize to Pauline. Not getting a response from Pauline, Cathy leaves. Aunt Pauline eventually comes back to the Lane household. Note: This is the first of William Schallert's four dual roles in the series and also the first of Schallert's three appearances in the series as Kenneth Lane, Cathy's father (he later returns as Kenneth in the episodes "The Christmas Present" and "Auld Lang Syne" and Uncle Jed in the episode "A Visit from Uncle Jed").
5	5	"The Birds and the Bees Bit"	Stanley Prager	Sidney Sheldon	October 16, 1963	1008
Patty tells Cathy how much she wishes she had traveled as much as Cathy has. Ross runs inside the house hiding from a new girl in town, Nikki Lee Blake. The Southern girl is very polite and Natalie, Patty and Cathy instantly like her. Nikki has been giving presents to Ross hoping he will take her to an upcoming school dance. When Natalie finds out that it is a charity dance for orphan children, she insists Ross goes. Ross asks Patty's help in getting out of going, but she refuses. Cathy goes to talk to Ross and sees he's packed and is ready to run away. She tries to talk Ross into going to the dance, but he says it will just lead to others things and soon he'll be married. Ross tries to leave out the front door, but Nikki Lee is there. Ross talks to Martin, who tries to explain that one day Ross will be interested in girls. Martin talks with Patty and tells her she should think of Ross' feelings. Patty and Cathy talk to Ross about girls, teach him how to dance and what to talk about with Nikki Lee. The night of the dance, Ross gets cold feet. After talking to Nikki for a while, Ross gains his confidence and goes to the dance. Later that evening, Ross and Nikki come home and arrange to get together several more times. Nikki kisses Ross on the cheek. Ross tells Patty and Cathy he had the best time of his life. Note: This is the first of Susan Melvin's two appearances in the series, guest-starring as Nikki Lee Blake (she later returns in the episode "The Continental").
6	6	"The Slumber Party"	Stanley Prager	Leo & Pauline Townsend	October 23, 1963	1009
Patty and Cathy have a slumber party at their house for some of their girlfriends. This is Cathy's first slumber party. Ross is feeling left out. Richard, Henry, Tom and another boy show up at the door, after the party starts. But they soon leave. Unbeknownst to Patty and Cathy, Ross tapes the girls' conversations during the party. It's the middle of the night and the girls wake Martin and Natalie up. The next morning Patty and Cathy finds notes on their beds. On them are some of the gossip the girls talked about. Ross tells them he recorded them and then blackmails them into doing things for him. Patty and Cathy search Ross' room for the tape. They don't find it and now have to clean the room. Martin and Natalie know something is up, but they can't get any information out of Ross. The cousins are waiting on Ross hand and foot. After they find the tape recorder, Patty and Cathy turn the table on Ross. They record him bragging about how he can manipulate Martin and Natalie. They now blackmail Ross. Martin tells the girls that Ross doesn't seem very happy. Something Martin says has the girls feeling sorry for Ross and they won't use the tape. Note: This is the first of John Spencer's seven appearances in the series, guest-starring as Henry (he later returns in the episodes "How to Be Popular," "Horoscope," "Going Steady," "Pen Pals," "The Greatest Psychologist in the World" and "How to Succeed in Romance").
7	7	"The Babysitters"	Stanley Prager	R.S. Allen	October 30, 1963	1010
Patty and Richard have a fight over his spending time with another girl. Patty calls off their date for an upcoming dance. Knowing that Richard is taking the other girl to the dance, Patty now wants to get Richard back. She sees a beautiful expensive dress in a newspaper ad but can't get the money out of her father. To raise money, Patty wants to start "an organization for babysitting". She would get a commission from babysitters in exchange for getting jobs for them. She talks Richard into helping her and they go to an apartment building to find some clients. Patty will call the service "Doctor's Babysitting Agency", since she once sat for a doctor's child. They first speak to a Mrs. Gresham. Her husband comes into the room. He tells his wife they need to get all the tenants to fight the landlord's actions at a meeting that night. Mrs. Gresham asks Patty if she could get 5 babysitters for that evening. Patty tells her she can do it. With Cathy's help, Patty and Richard tackle all the babysitting jobs themselves, with a host of problems. Despite all the problems, Patty is able to buy her dress. Heywood Hale Broun as Mr. Mickel. Bob Kaliban as Charlie Anderson.
8	8	"The Conquering Hero"	William Asher	Jerry Davis & Lee Loeb	November 6, 1963	1004
Patty comes home with news that Brooklyn Heights High's star basketball player Stretch Edwards is moving away a week before the big game. Martin really wanted the team to win and without Stretch, they won't. Martin says that Stretch can stay with them until the game is over. Stretch is polite, but breaks a large list of items through his awkwardness. Martin keeps making excuses for Stretch, while Natalie keeps a record of what everything is costing. Martin puts up a basketball hoop next to the house and Stretch winds up breaking a window. Coach Coglan comes over and tells Stretch that he's flunking English literature and won't be able to play. Mrs. Coglan (Jane Connell), the English teacher, wants to help her husband. She agrees that if Stretch gets a B on his final exam, he will be passed. Cathy comes up with a plan to have Stretch subconsciously learn while he's asleep. When the plan doesn't work, Stretch feels that he's hopeless. Cathy comes up with another plan based on basketball plays. Though things didn't go quite the way they should have, Stretch passes. But, a case of the measles prevents Stretch from playing. Note: This is Larry Poland's only TV appearance, guest-starring as Stretch; this is also Charles Nelson Reilly's only appearance in the series, guest-starring as Coach Coglan.
9	9	"The President"	Stanley Prager	Sidney Sheldon	November 13, 1963	1011
Patty and Cathy unknowingly nominate each other for President of the Girls League. Both want to withdraw in favor of the other. Martin feels they have a responsibility to run. At first the girls compliment each other, but it very quickly becomes a definite rivalry. They are running against a lackluster third candidate, Susan Baxter. Patty and Cathy both start some dirty campaigning and make a lot of promises. Richard tells Patty that she should set up a campaign headquarters. Patty sets it up in her and Cathy's bedroom. Cathy then sets hers up in Ross' room. Not knowing what the other did, Patty and Cathy each pay Ross to spy on the other. Things become very tense at the house and Natalie is not happy and gets into a fight with Martin. They later make up. Natalie worries how each girl will feel losing to the other. Martin says everything will work out fine. Ted tells Cathy that a straw ballot revealed Patty is leading voters 50 percent to Cathy's 30. Susan got 15 percent and the other 5 voted for Rock Hudson. Ted suggests that she debate Patty. The girls agree to a debate, which turns out quite bitter. Patty and Cathy make up when they both lose to Susan. Patricia Bosworth as Miss Morgan. Mary Young as Ella. Note: This is the first of Skip Hinnant's six appearances in the series, guest-starring as Ted, Cathy's boyfriend (he later returns in the episodes "Double Date," "The Continental," "The Friendship Bit," "Patty, the Practical Joker" and "Cathy, the Rebel").
10	10	"Double Date"	Stanley Prager	Ray Singer & Dick Chevillat	November 20, 1963	1012
Richard and Ted tell Patty and Cathy that they look forward to the dance party that evening. Natalie informs Patty that she made an appointment to get her flu shot. Patty doesn't want to get her flu shot because of the party. She tries to talk Cathy into going in her place. Cathy says no, as she already had her flu shot. Natalie has Cathy go with Patty, but warns Dr. Williams of Patty's potential plan. Dr. Williams doesn't believe Cathy is really Cathy and gives her the shot. Patty promises that she will tell Natalie about the mix-up, but not till tomorrow. Later, Patty does confess to Natalie what happened. Cathy's reaction to the shot causes her to miss the dance party. Cathy's worried about standing up Ted. Patty decides to pull a double shift so Cathy won't lose Ted. Patty has a very hectic evening trying to juggle her time between Richard and Ted. Things are awkward when Ted kisses Patty. It becomes even more complicated when both Patty and Cathy are to be in the dance contest. When the boys start fighting each other, Patty finally tells them the truth. Margaret Hamilton as Maid. Lu Leonard as Nurse. Note: This is the second of Skip Hinnant's six appearances in the series, guest-starring as Ted, Cathy's boyfriend.
11	11	"The Actress"	Stanley Prager	Sidney Sheldon	November 27, 1963	1013
Patty goes with Richard, who wants to audition for a part for the annual high school play. Though she didn't intend to, Patty reads for the role of Cleopatra for guest director Mr. Strassman (Alan Mowbray). He immediately gives her the part. Cathy, who wanted the lead role, is given the part of Iris and to understudy Cleopatra. After his continual flattery, Patty starts to believe she can be a big Hollywood star. Patty talks Martin into bringing her to his newspaper office. There Patty types up an rave review of herself to send to top Hollywood producers. Upon receiving Patty's letter, Producer Dore Schary sees through her scheme. But, he likes her "initiative" and sends someone to cover the play. Natalie wonders what would happen if Patty actually became an actress. The day of the play, Patty develops laryngitis. Dr. Lewis (Matt Crowley) believes it is psychosomatic resulting from a fear of failing. Cathy will play the part. Patty makes a last-minute recovery and heads to the theater. Both her and Cathy wind up on stage with comical complications. Neither girl will get off the stage and the audience is enjoying the farce. Afterwards, the girls apologize to each other. Mr. Strassman tells the family the play was a hit. Mr. Ryan (Jon Stone), the Talent Scout, tells Patty he may have a part in a movie for her. Patty's laryngitis returns.
12	12	"How to Be Popular"	William Asher	Sidney Sheldon	December 4, 1963	1001
Cathy feels like a wallflower at Patty's party. She overhears Patty ask Henry to pay some attention to Cathy, but he's not interested. Cathy tells Patty she has a headache and returns to her room. She dreams of being popular and having a date with Frankie Avalon. Cathy writes a letter to newspaper columnist Aunt Jane asking help to change her image. Aunt Jane sends Cathy a book she wrote herself entitled "You Can Be Popular". But every time Cathy follows one of the rules in the book, it seems to backfire on her. Cathy tells Patty that she is destined to be unpopular. Thanks to something that Patty says, Cathy does find something that she can do that makes her a hit with everyone. And it has to do with an African tribal dance. Patty is now envious and angry. Natalie and Martin hear Cathy set up a meeting with Richard and are wondering what's going on. Cathy tells them she and Richard are planning to throw a surprise party for Patty to thank her for her help. Note: This is the first of Frankie Avalon's two appearances in the series as himself (he later returns in the episode "A Foggy Day in Brooklyn Heights"). This is the second of John Spencer's seven appearances in the series, guest-starring as Henry.
13	13	"The Songwriters"	William Asher	Sidney Sheldon	December 11, 1963	1006
Patty is mad that Richard is planning to take Sue Ellen Turner out. In order to win Richard back, Patty, on the advice of her mother, decides to write a poem. Patty finds the poem "When Love Is Gone" in a book, passes it off as her own, and gives it to Richard. While watching TV, Patty and Cathy learn about the Jimmy Dean Songwriting Contest. Jimmy will sing the winning song on his show and the winner gets $100 and the song will be published. Cathy puts the poem to music and Richard says he'll send it into the contest. Patty tries to stop him from taking the music, but it doesn't work. Patty confesses to Cathy that she didn't write the poem. The next morning, Patty and Cathy try to get their song back, but Richard has already left for the post office. They go to see publisher Sam Cramer (Phil Foster), but he refuses to give it back as it is one of the final three selected. The girls then figure if they win, they will send the money to the poet, Charles Remington (Paul McGrath). After the song wins, they hear from Charles and he wants to talk to them. Martin and Natalie try to figure a way out of the trouble Patty and Cathy could be facing. Charles tells them that because of the song, he and a long lost love got together and he thanks the girls. As Charles is already quite wealthy, he says the girls can do what they want with the royalties. Martin tells the girls they will set up a scholarship for other artists. Note: This is Jimmy Dean's only appearance in the series as himself.
14	14	"The Princess Cathy"	Stanley Prager	Sidney Sheldon	December 18, 1963	1016
Patty and Cathy compete for the attention of Kalmere "Kal" of Buchanistan. He is at school visiting America to learn its customs. He tells Patty, Cathy and Natalie how he lives with his uncle under the same roof with 50 others and has never handled any money. Kal would like to go back to his country to help the poor. Cathy and Kal are studying history and Kal asks her what are some of her dreams. Kal gives Cathy an emerald-looking object as a gift. He is surprised when she says it would make a good paperweight. Martin tells Natalie that he thinks it's a real emerald. He also mentions how he got Kal a job at the Chronicle as a copy boy. After Martin learns Kal's full name, he realizes that he is the crowned prince of Buchanistan. Kal's uncle, General Sureka, comes to the Lane household with Kal's offer of marriage to Cathy. Martin is against the idea as Cathy is too young. To everyone's surprise, Cathy accepts. Martin tries to talk her out of it. She has grand plans to help the poverty-stricken people of Buchanistan. When Cathy learns that Kal will be able to have other wives, she changes her mind about the marriage.
15	15	"The Christmas Present"	Stanley Prager	Sidney Sheldon	December 25, 1963	1014
Cathy's father Kenneth is supposed to come to visit for Christmas. Martin learns from J.R. Castle that Kenneth was arrested in Kurdistan for entering the country illegally. This incident is causing J.R. a lot of headaches. J.R. wants Martin to fire Kenneth when he gets out of jail. Martin and Natalie are about to tell Cathy about her father. Cathy reminisces about how no matter where he was in the world, Kenneth always visited Cathy for Christmas. They can't bring themselves to tell Cathy. Cathy finds out about her father when she sees it in the paper, but still believes he will show up for Christmas. Patty tells Cathy to not hope for a miracle, but Cathy says Christmas is about miracles. Patty suggests that Martin pose as Kenneth to make Cathy happy. Martin reluctantly agrees to do it. The real Kenneth shows up and everyone but Cathy thinks it's Martin. Kenneth is a little confused by the way the family is acting. But then later, Martin shows up dressed as Kenneth and Cathy happily realizes what her uncle tried to do. Martin then sees Kenneth. Unfortunately, J.R. shows up and Martin has to tell Kenneth he's fired. Note: This is the second of William Schallert's four dual roles in the series and also the second of Schallert's three appearances in the series as Kenneth Lane, Cathy's father; this is also the third of John McGiver's five appearances in the series, guest-starring as J.R. Castle, Martin and Kenneth's boss at The New York Daily Chronicle (this episode ends with Duke breaking the fourth wall and interacting with her television audience, inviting them to watch next week's episode).
16	16	"Auld Lang Syne"	Stanley Prager	Sidney Sheldon	January 1, 1964	1015
Everyone is mad at J.R. Castle after he fired Kenneth for disobeying orders. Natalie asks him to rehire Kenneth, but apparently it's a policy of the newspaper that once someone is fired they're never re-hired. Patty pretends to be Cathy and tries to flatter J.R. into rehiring Kenneth, but it doesn't work. Kenneth tells Cathy that it might not be too bad having a desk job. But Cathy knows he'd be miserable. Patty comes up with the idea that Kenneth should write a book about his thrilling foreign correspondent adventures. After it becomes very popular, J.R. will have to hire him back. Kenneth reluctantly agrees. Cathy and Patty go to talk to publisher Bennett Blake (Peter Turgeon). It turns out that Bennett had already been interested in Kenneth writing a book and draws up a contract. Blake wants to book done in three months. Cathy tells Kenneth about the contract. Kenneth decides that he isn't comfortable as a novelist. Kenneth makes an appointment at another newspaper. When new details of the Kurdistan trip emerge, J.R. wants Kenneth back. Cathy convinces her father to take J.R.'s offer, even though it means he will be traveling a lot again. The family celebrates New Years by seeing Kenneth off at the airport. Toni Darnay as Secretary. Note: This is the third of William Schallert's four dual roles in the series and also the last of three appearances in the series as Kenneth Lane, Cathy's father; this is also the fourth of John McGiver's five appearances in the series, guest-starring as J.R. Castle, Martin and Kenneth's boss at The New York Daily Chronicle.
17	17	"Horoscope"	Alan Rafkin	Sidney Sheldon	January 8, 1964	1017
Patty tries to borrow money from Cathy so she can buy a birthday present for Natalie, but Cathy says no. Patty reads her father's horoscope in the newspaper which says he should avoid driving today, because of a chance of getting into an accident. Martin does get into an accident coming out of the driveway. Hoping to raise the money to buy her mother's present, Patty decides to charge people to tell them their horoscope. She studies books and charts and turns her room into a fortune telling parlor. Ross even asks Patty for advice. It's not long before Patty has a line of paying customers. Martin tells Patty there's a law against fortune telling. He forbids her from charging her customers. Patty won't charge anyone, but will take donations. Patty only needs a little more money to get the present. She talks Cathy into also giving readings to double their money and then Patty will close up shop. This, however, leads to some confusion with the clients. Detective Roberts (Frank Marth) comes by to question Patty about some illegal fortune telling in the neighborhood. Roberts sees Cathy in a gypsy outfit and Patty tries to come up with a reason. Patty manages to remove all the fortune telling decorations from her room before Roberts comes to look. Cathy wants to give the money Patty raised to the Police fund. Roberts does see all the decorations under Patty's bed. Patty looks at her fortune and it says it's a good day to start another career. Martin lends Patty the money to buy the present. Note: This is the third of John Spencer's seven appearances in the series, guest-starring as Henry.
18	18	"The Tycoons"	Alan Rafkin	Sidney Sheldon	January 15, 1964	1018
Cathy wears a dress to school that she made herself featuring a large cat on the front. The dress catches on with the other girls and Patty starts taking orders to sell them. Things quickly get out of control when Patty takes 43 orders in one day. Cathy tells Patty there's no way they will be able to fill those orders. To get some business advice, Patty reaches out to top dress designer Gregory Madison (Robert Q. Lewis). After the initial surprise of Patty and Cathy being young girls, Gregory genuinely compliments the dress. He makes suggestions out of the goodness of his heart and directs them to the appropriate suppliers. Natalie tells Martin about Patty's Worldwide Dress Company. Cathy spends all her time making the dresses. Patty and Cathy visit with Miss Mason (Neva Patterson), a department store manager who places an order for two gross. They soon realize they need 288 dresses in three days. They get the necessary materials, equipment and a bunch of girls to help. Things become complicated after Martin reads the details of the order. Plus, they receive a visit from Mr. Dobson, who is with the government small business division. Dobson tells them about all the forms and licenses that are required. Then another girl at school creates some competition. It's not long before the business folds. Martin is still proud of the girls. Susan Tyrrell as Sue Ellen. Note: This is the first of Kitty Sullivan's 14 appearances in the series, guest-starring as Sue Ellen Turner (she later returns in the episodes "Chip Off the Old Block," "A Slight Case of Disaster," "Leave It to Patty," "The Little Dictator," "The Green Eyed Monster," "Simon Says," "The Greatest Psychologist in the World," "Patty and the Peace Corps," "This Little Patty Went to Market," "Hi, Society," "Don't Monkey with Mendel," "Patty and the Cut Rate Casanova" and "The Daughter Bit").
19	19	"Author! Author!"	Stanley Prager	Sidney Sheldon	January 22, 1964	1019
Cathy is reading a bestselling book written by a 16-year-old French girl who has become a trend-setter in Paris. It's about life, as seen through the eyes of a teenage girl. Patty thinks she can do the same in America. Patty decides to write her book in the attic. She has a hard time getting started. Patty buys a French looking outfit to wear for inspiration. Richard tells Cathy that Patty has broken three dates with him. Martin tells Patty that it's hard to get a book published and she shouldn't get her hopes up. Martin reads the book, which is full of wild stories, and tells Patty it lacks authenticity. She sends it to a publisher anyway and he excepts it. Patty is interviewed about her book for the school paper. Martin is still surprised that someone is publishing the book. Mr. Blair (Roger C. Carmel), the publisher, comes to the Lane household and is quite flattering. Martin quickly finds out how unscrupulous Mr. Blair really is. Blair mentions that Patty signed a contract and Martin tells him she's only sixteen years old. When Blair learns that Martin is with the New York Chronicle, he agrees to publish 100 copies of Patty's book at his expense. Later, Patty tells Blair she has written another book.
20	20	"The Continental"	Stanley Prager	Sidney Sheldon	January 29, 1964	1020
Martin comes home with news that J.R. Castle has reassigned him to the Paris bureau for a year. He's worried that the family will be against the move. Martin is surprised when the entire family is enthusiastic about the trip. They start sorting which of their belongings to pack and which will go into storage. Natalie begins to show the home to potential renters. They practice learning French. Patty soon realizes how much she will miss Richard. She gets sad when a man comes to disconnect her phone. Ross says goodbye to his young sweetheart Nikki Lee and knows he'll miss his friends. Grocer Popodapolous (Henry Lascoe) gives Natalie a "Come Home Soon" gift. He tells her how the neighborhood hates to see them leave. Ted asks Cathy if she really has to go. The family learns the house has been rented. The kids tell Natalie they don't want to go. She doesn't either, but all the arrangements have been made. Thinking the family will be disappointed, Martin brings news that J.R. has changed his mind and they're staying home. He is surprised at how thrilled the family is. William LeMassena as Mr. Cameron, real estate agent. Ruth Kobart as Mrs. Atkinson. Note: This is Susan Melvin's final appearance in the series, guest-starring as Nikki Lee Blake; this is also the third of Skip Hinnant's six appearances in the series, guest-starring as Ted, Cathy's boyfriend.
21	21	"Let 'Em Eat Cake"	Stanley Prager	Sidney Sheldon	February 5, 1964	1021
Natalie has baked a cake for the annual church bazaar contest. She hopes to finally beat Mrs. Davis (Shannon Bolin) and win first prize. Natalie then goes to the beauty shop. Not knowing about the contest, Patty and Cathy eat some of the cake. When they find out what the cake was for, Patty tries to piece the cake back together. They talk housekeeper Mrs. Williams (Margaret Hamilton) into baking another one. This time Ross unknowingly eats part of it. Patty, Cathy, and Ross try to bake another cake. Mrs. Davis comes by and mentions to Patty that her and Natalie have a bet over who will win. When Richard finds out what Patty is doing, he refuses to go to the bazaar. Things do not go well with the cake. Patty goes to Mr. Brown's (George S. Irving) Bakery to buy a cake and rushes it to the bazaar. Martin comes home and Cathy tells him what happened. He goes to the bakery to get a cake to take to the bazaar. To make matters worse, the contest judge turns out to be Mr. Brown. Turns out Natalie had time to bake another cake and she wins with her entry. Back at home, the girls bake a cake for Ross' scout troop and Martin eats part of it.
22	22	"Going Steady"	Stanley Prager	Sidney Sheldon	February 12, 1964	1022
Richard has given Patty his school ring, meaning the two are now going steady. Martin and Natalie both think she is too young, but reluctantly allow it. Richard starts acting like a member of the family and Martin is not happy about it. Patty and Richard both turn down really exciting dates with other people because they are committed to each other. The two don't do much of anything because they can't decide on something the two agree on. Richard's father, Jonathan Harrison, comes over to let Martin and Natalie know he is also against the children going steady. Jonathan complains that Richard now wants a car and a bigger allowance. Cathy gives the parents the idea to scare Patty and Richard by pushing the couple toward marriage. Martin talks to Richard about marrying Patty. Richard has a fantasy about being married and running out of money because Patty keeps buying expensive things. Back to reality, Richard tells Patty that his father came over and talked to Martin and Natalie about the families merging due to marriage. Patty fantasizes about doing all the house work and other things while Richard sits around doing nothing. She has to take care of the baby while Richard flirts with other girls. Back to reality, Patty tells Martin she's not ready to go steady. She asks Martin's help with breaking it off. Martin finds a way to make both Patty and Richard happy. Note: This is the first of David Doyle's three appearances in the series, guest-starring as Jonathan Harrison, Richard's construction engineer father (he later returns in the episodes "The Drop Out" and "Patty the Folk Singer"); this is also the fourth of John Spencer's seven appearances in the series, guest-starring as Henry.
23	23	"Are Mothers People?"	Stanley Prager	Sidney Sheldon	February 19, 1964	1023
After she hears a psychologist on the radio, Natalie begins to feel over-worked and unappreciated at home. Her friend Joan Hollis (Joan Copeland) says that the next day she should pretend to be sick and she'll hopefully get some sympathy. Natalie stays in bed and yet everyone still asks her to do things. Natalie tells Joan that the family has no feelings for her at all. Joan then suggests that Natalie spend the day at the beauty parlor and see if the family notices how good she looks. Natalie even buys a new fancy dress. No one in the family says a word about how nice she looks. They just want to know when dinner is as they all have something to do later. Martin tells Natalie she should manage her time better. Joan now has Natalie stay out late with her and not cook dinner to see if the family gets worried. The family seems to not even notice. The girls sense that Natalie has been irritable lately. When Patty and Cathy do all of Natalie's chores for a day, Natalie now feels she's not needed. The family starts to sense something's wrong and tells Natalie she should go on a vacation by herself. Natalie now feels even more not needed and she says maybe she'll go away for a month. She starts packing and the family tells her she can't go. Natalie finally tells the family that all she wants is a "thank you" now and then.
24	24	"The Con Artist"	Stanley Prager	Sidney Sheldon	February 26, 1964	1024
Mr. Hansen (Paul Reed), a door to door vacuum cleaner salesman, comes to the Lane household. Cathy wants to get Natalie a present, so she agrees to buy one. But, what she thought would be an inexpensive purchase, winds up costing much more than she can afford because of all the attachments. Patty says she'll be able to get Hansen to cancel the deal, but gets talked into buying even more. Patty and Cathy then try to get the money for Hansen by selling the vacuum and attachments to someone else. Their first stop is to a Mr. Rogers. Despite the price, he agrees to buy it. When Patty and Cathy learn he is a policeman, they make up an excuse and leave. Next they try a Mrs. Appleton (Estelle Parsons). They make a demonstration mess, but when there's no electricity, they quickly leave. They finally sell the vacuum. But then they learn from Martin that there are phony salesmen going around cheating housewives. And the paper says it appears there are now two teenage girls involved. Martin wants write an editorial about the story and thinks the police will catch them. The girls buy the vacuum back from the woman they sold it to for $10 more. They go back to Mrs. Appleton and clean up the mess. Then they confess to Martin what happened. Because they learned their lesson, Martin will pay Hansen for the vacuum. Just as the family is about to give Natalie the vacuum, she shows them that she bought the same one.
25	25	"The Perfect Teenager"	Stanley Prager	Sidney Sheldon	March 4, 1964	1025
Patty sees a test in a magazine to see how good of a teenager she is. Cathy says she took it and got an 85%. Patty's self-confidence plummets when she fails the test. Cathy tries to tell Patty that those tests don't mean anything. Richard comes by, but Patty is too depressed to go out with him. In order to regain her confidence, Patty decides to take Mrs. Selby's modeling class. Mrs. Selby introduces Mr. Pell (Phil Leeds), a photographer. He wants to pick three girls for a photo shoot. Patty hides her face so she isn't picked. Patty rethinks being photographed when Martin says how much money a model can make. Mr. Pell comes by again. This time Patty is not shy about being seen and she is chosen for an advertising campaign. Patty brags to the family about how famous she'll be. The photo shoot doesn't turn out to be as glamorous as Patty thought it would be. Patty is more depressed than before. Martin tries to cheer her up. She feels better when the pictures are published and she sees what the campaign was for. Marcia Strassman as Model. Note: This is Kaye Ballard's only appearance in the series, guest-starring as Mrs. Selby.
26	26	"Chip Off the Old Block"	Stanley Prager	Rod Parker	March 11, 1964	1026
Patty becomes editor of the school newspaper. She would like to get a quick increase in readership. Martin tells her to maintain quality and model her paper after his. Patty instead wants to model the paper after the New York Query, a popular tabloid, because of its huge readership. Patty and her staff have a meeting with Mr. Brewster, the principal. Patty and her reporters still have a hard time finding an interesting story. Patty decides to take dull stories and spice them up. They print up their first paper with the enhanced stories. Cathy thinks they should get an expert opinion to make sure they don't get in trouble. The girls go to Mr. Rogers (Cliff Carpenter), the editor of the Query. Mr. Rogers is surprised Patty didn't go to her father for advice. After looking at their paper, he tells them they did a good job. Mr. Rogers prints some of Patty's stories in his tabloid and Brewster is furious. He comes by the house and says he's received threatening calls and he has to cooperate with any investigation. Brewster tells Patty to never go near the newspaper office again. Patty finds a way to make up for what she has done. She prints up one more paper with the truth and an apology. Brewster tells her she can remain the editor. Note: This is the second of Kitty Sullivan's 14 appearances in the series, guest-starring as Sue Ellen Turner; this is also the only episode in the series (other than the unaired pilot) in which Paul O'Keefe does not appear in, nor is he credited in.
27	27	"The Wedding Anniversary Caper"	Stanley Prager	Arnold Horwitt	March 18, 1964	1027
Patty catches Ross trying to take a picture of her. Patty doesn't know this, but Ross wants to enter her into a Beautiful Teens contest. He hopes to win a TV set for his parents' 20th anniversary. Ross exaggerates Patty's talents and background in her biography. Ross gets a letter and learns that Patty is chosen as a finalist in the contest. But she will have to show off her special talents and appearance along with the other finalists. Patty initially declines but Cathy talks her into helping her brother. Ross fails to tell Patty that the judges will expect her to sing, dance and speak several foreign languages. It's Patty's turn on stage. She learns from the Chief Judge (Cliff Hall) that her father flew in the war and her mother is a Baroness. Patty wins, but only with Cathy's help. The children tell their parents what they did. They feel bad that they cheated and go tell the judges. Later, Ross mentions to Patty that there is a contest for girl tuba players. Song: Patty sings "Tell Me Mama".
28	28	"Pen Pals"	Stanley Prager	Sidney Sheldon	March 25, 1964	1029
In Patty's "Young Set" magazine, there is a section for pen pals. She reads a letter from Lancelot, a self-described ideal boy. She starts a correspondence with Lancelot. Patty calls herself Guinevere. While in the malt shop, Patty shows some of her girlfriends Lancelot's response to her. Richard comes by and Patty complains about how he's dressed and tells him to shape up. She quickly falls for Lancelot after reading more of his sweet, sensitive letters. What Patty doesn't know is that Richard is Lancelot. Patty starts to lose interest in Richard. Patty tells Richard they should stop dating, and they say their goodbyes. When Patty says there may be another boy, Richard says he may have another girl. Martin says that Richard hasn't been around for a while. When Patty mentions Lancelot, Martin thinks she should meet this person. Patty panics when Lancelot writes that he wants to meet her. She's afraid he'll find out how ordinary she is. Lancelot and Guinevere agree to meet at the malt shop. When Patty realizes Richard is Lancelot, she storms out of the shop. The family convinces Patty that there are two sides to Richard and they get back together. When Richard mentions that he was stood up, Patty finds a way to let him know she was Guinevere. Note: This is the fifth of John Spencer's seven appearances in the series, guest-starring as Henry.
29	29	"The Friendship Bit"	Stanley Prager	Sidney Sheldon	April 1, 1964	1030
Cathy receives a pin from Martin and Natalie for getting the highest score of the class on a test. Soon after Patty comes down with a spell of unrelenting sneezing. Dr. Fayer (Matt Crowley), after several tests and studying her schedule, concludes she's allergic to Cathy. Dr. Fayer advises they keep their distance from one another. Cathy feels it may be psychosomatic from Patty's resentment toward her. Patty thinks that's silly. Cathy does some research on psychosomatic symptoms and now definitely believes Patty hates her. At the ice cream parlor, Patty and Richard sit at one table and Cathy sits at another. Richard thinks the whole thing is funny. Ted joins Cathy. Cathy gets teased about making Patty sneeze. Cathy then accuses Patty of being schizophrenic and having two personalities and leaves. Martin asks Natalie if Patty may be jealous of Cathy. Patty, Richard, Ted, Alfred and Maggie are studying for a math final coming up. Cathy asks Natalie to take the pin back. Cathy intentionally fails the test so Patty doesn't have to be jealous of her. But in the end, they find that there is something in the pin Cathy got that Patty is allergic to. Note: This is the fourth of Skip Hinnant's six appearances in the series, guest-starring as Ted, Cathy's boyfriend.
30	30	"A Slight Case of Disaster"	Stanley Prager	Phil Shuken	April 8, 1964	1028
Patty is shopping for a dress for a school dance and $20 is all Martin would give her. Patty and Maggie are in the dress shop when Sue Ellen shows up. Patty is not to be out-done by Sue Ellen and charges a $79.50 dress. But then Sue Ellen buys a dress for $95. Patty intends to return the dress later that day. Cathy needs a dress for a musicale that night. Natalie tells her to wear Patty's new dress. Cathy gets a stain on the dress and it's ruined. Patty first asks Ross for the money, with no luck. Patty and Cathy try several other ways to get the money. Finally, Patty pawns the gold bracelet that Martin gave her as a birthday present. She then finds a cheap look-a-like bracelet. Martin wants to have the bracelet engraved. Mr. Carey, the jeweler, says the bracelet is worthless, apologizes for the mistake and gives Martin another gold one. After Patty finds out about the new gold bracelet and Mr. Carey comes by the house, she confesses to what happened. Martin manages to work things out with Mr. Carey and the pawnbroker and Patty and Cathy agree to pay for the dress. Patty and Cathy find out that Sue Ellen has to return her dress. Note: This is the third of Kitty Sullivan's 14 appearances in the series, guest-starring as Sue Ellen Turner. A genuine gold bracelet can be told apart from a replica because the genuine one is much denser and heavier. According to Incredible Comparisons (©1996) by Russell Ash, gold has a density of roughly 11 ounces per cubic inch.
31	31	"Patty, the Foster Mother"	Stanley Prager	Sidney Sheldon	April 15, 1964	1031
Patty and Cathy's teacher Mrs. Johnson discusses Korea and the inadequate care of orphans there. She suggests symbolically adopting an orphan named Kim. One student will be in charge of money collection, writing to him, and be his adoptive mother or father. Patty eagerly volunteers. Patty gets a part time job and will send Kim the money. The family is impressed with Patty and also contribute. Even Patty's friends give her money for Kim. Kim writes to her and calls her "Mama Patty", but then the letters stop. It's been three weeks and Patty now feels abandoned. One day Patty opens the door to find a Mrs. Lomax and Kim there. Apparently Patty accidentally signed an application to officially adopt him. Despite the difficulties this will present, Martin says Kim can stay. Martin tries to find a Korean speaking housekeeper. The family has a hard time communicating with Kim, but become quite fond of him. Mrs. Lomax comes by with bad news. It seems Kim had already been adopted, but due to a clerical error, he was sent to Patty. Though the family is very disappointed, especially Patty, they know it's for the best. Six months later, Mrs. Lomax brings Kim over for a visit and he gives Patty some bubble gum.
32	32	"The Drop Out"	Stanley Prager	Sidney Sheldon	April 22, 1964	1032
Martin is serving on a committee to help stop school drop outs. He asks Cathy and Patty to serve as student advisors, but Patty says she is dropping out the next week. At school, Patty tells Cathy it's a ploy to shock Richard out of wanting to drop out. Patty's plan backfires and Richard is happy that she will also drop out. After the family tries to change Richard's mind and he refuses because he wants to make a lot of money, Patty breaks up with him. Martin wonders why Richard is so bent on making money. Martin learns that Richard's father's construction company lost a $2,000,000 turnpike contract. The family now think Richard is going to work to support his family. Martin decides to try and find some small construction jobs for Mr. Harrison. What they don't know is that Jonathon Harrison is doing extremely well. There is then some confusion when Mr. Harrison thinks it is Martin who is broke. Jonathon comes by the Lane house and learns that Richard is quitting school. The family finds out that Jonathon is quite wealthy. When Richard finds out his dad doesn't need the money, he stays in school. Don Scardino as Arthur. Note: This is the second of David Doyle's three appearances in the series, guest-starring as Jonathan Harrison, Richard's construction engineer father.
33	33	"Leave It to Patty"	Stanley Prager	Arnold Horwitt	April 29, 1964	1033
Patty is competing with Sue Ellen to be chairman of the school prom. Patty promises a great band and fantastic setting, but Sue Ellen thinks she's bluffing. Sue Ellen says that because her father owns a bank, he knows a lot of people and will get a celebrity for the prom. Patty asks Martin if he knows anyone, which he doesn't. Patty learns that Bertram "Binky" Bristol, who is a huge pop star, was an old school friend of Cathy's. Cathy says that Bertram used to have a crush on her. When Cathy refuses to contact Bertram, who happens to be in town, Patty decides to pose as her and go see him. Patty becomes the chairman when she promises to get Bertram. Patty goes to the hotel to see Bertram and is bit star struck. At first Bertram says he's just too busy to drop by the prom. Patty then gives him a sob story and he agrees to show up. Cathy tells Patty she wants call Bertram. Not wanting her ruse to be exposed, Patty lies and says that Bertram didn't remember her. Bertram arrives at the prom and performs a song. After, he learns that it was Patty that posed as Cathy. Despite the deception, Bertram is happy to see the real Cathy. Patty's sob story winds up getting her in trouble with Martin. Note: This is the fourth of Kitty Sullivan's 14 appearances in the series, guest-starring as Sue Ellen Turner.
34	34	"The Little Dictator"	Stanley Prager	Sidney Sheldon; Based on an idea by Bonnie Thompson	May 6, 1964	1034
Brooklyn Heights High Principal Mr. Brewster is to pick a student for the annual ritual of sitting in as principal for a week. Patty believes it will be her, but it turns out to be Cathy. One of Cathy's duties will be to teach a class. During the class, Patty constantly interrupts with silly questions and comments. The other kids start laughing and also disrupting class. Cathy gives Patty several demerits. Patty gets the kids to calm down. Cathy decides to forget about the demerits, but Mr. Brewster finds out and makes Patty stay after school. Patty will now miss a big basketball game. Patty begs Mr. Brewster to let her go to the game, but he refuses. Patty is not speaking to Cathy and Martin feels Patty needs to learn discipline. Cathy and Patty make up, until Patty finds out that Cathy went to the game with Richard. Cathy tries again to make up, but it doesn't work. Martin comes up with the idea that Cathy should let Patty teach the class for one day. Patty learns that it's not that easy. She has to give Richard several demerits. Mr. Brewster makes Richard stay after school. Patty is worried Richard will be mad at her, but he's actually proud of her. Note: This is the fifth of Kitty Sullivan's 14 appearances in the series, guest-starring as Sue Ellen Turner.
35	35	"The Working Girl"	Stanley Prager	Sidney Sheldon	May 13, 1964	1035
Classmate George asks Patty to tell his boss Mr. Anderson that he's quitting his job at the Shake Shop. His family has to go to Detroit to care for his sick grandmother. Though he initially wanted a boy, Patty talks Mr. Anderson into giving her George's job. At the end of the day, while checking the receipts, Patty finds she is $5 short. She puts in $5 of her own money and doesn't tell Mr. Anderson. He finds a $5 bill on the floor after Patty leaves. Martin is very impressed and proud that Patty took on that busy of a job. Richard comes by to take Patty bowling, but she is exhausted. The next day, Patty is almost late for school because she overslept. The job is definitely taking its toll on Patty. Patty tells Cathy that she's going to quit the job. Martin reads Patty an editorial he wrote in the paper praising Patty's work ethic. Now Patty has no choice but to stay on the job. Natalie tells Martin that she thinks Patty is working too hard. Martin thinks she loves the job. Cathy volunteers to fill in for Patty the next day at the job, but Patty refuses. Patty is thrilled when George returns. But her joy is short lived when Martin tells her that he offered George a job as a copy-boy and Patty can return to the Shack shop.
36	36	"The Cousins"	William Asher	Sidney Sheldon	May 20, 1964	1036
Patty and Cathy reminisce about the time when Cathy first came to live with the Lane family. In flashbacks: Richard says that he's choosing Patty over Sue Ellen. Martin has a fight with his boss J.R. Castle. Because of the traffic, Martin and Natalie miss Cathy at the airport. There's a lot of confusion, because no one knows that Cathy looks exactly like Patty. Cathy winds up at the Chronicle. When asked, Cathy says her father is in Scotland. J.R. Castle, thinking Martin has quit, replaces him. Cathy makes it to the Lane household. Richard comes by and gives Cathy a kiss, thinking she is Patty. She slaps him and he leaves. The family finally meet Cathy and are surprised about how much the girls look alike. Martin finds out from Cathy that he's been replaced at the Chronicle. Posing as Cathy, Patty finds out some things the family thinks of their daughter and is hurt. Cathy finds a way to make things right with Patty. Martin gets his job back. Phyllis Coates as Secretary. Geraldine Wall as Maid. Note: This episode features parts of the unaired pilot, with William Schallert and Paul O'Keefe in their respective roles of Martin and Ross Lane; this is also John McGiver's final appearance in the series, guest-starring as J.R. Castle, Martin and Kenneth's boss at The New York Daily Chronicle. In 1997, TV Guide ranked this episode #71 on its list of the 100 Greatest Episodes.

=== Season 2 (1964–65) ===
No. overall	No. in season	Title	Directed by	Written by	Original release date	Prod. code
37	1	"The Green Eyed Monster"	Stanley Prager	Sidney Sheldon	September 16, 1964	1037
Everyone thinks that Patty has a date with Richard. They are surprised when a new boy named Geoffrey Davis shows up. He is the cousin of Harriett, a friend of Patty's, and just got into town. Geoffrey is a cadet and editor of his class's newspaper. Martin is impressed when Geoffrey says he uses the Chronicle as a model. Richard comes by and learns that Geoffrey just got a scholarship to Oxford. Later that night Patty tells Cathy that Geoffrey's wealthy family owns a horse farm in West Virginia. Patty is impressed with Geoffrey's charm and intelligence. Patty and Geoffrey see more of each other. Richard asks Martin's advice on how to compete with Geoffrey. Martin's suggestion works and Patty and Richard start seeing more of each other again. Natalie winds up giving Geoffrey advice on how to get Patty back. Geoffrey and Richard keep going back for more advice on how to gain Patty's attention. Natalie and Martin figure out that they've been giving conflicting advice. In the end, each boy winds up asking another girl to the big dance and Patty is left out in the cold. The night of the dance, Cathy, who has a date with George, asks Patty what she's going to do. Patty says she has plans, but she doesn't tell Cathy it's with Ross. Note: This is the sixth of Kitty Sullivan's 14 appearances in the series, guest-starring as Sue Ellen Turner.
38	2	"Practice Makes Perfect"	Stanley Prager	Sidney Sheldon	September 23, 1964	1038
To impress Martin, Patty gives up Rock 'n Roll for Classical music. She tries out for and is given a spot in the school orchestra. Martin is thrilled. But then the family sees that the instrument she has been given to play is the tuba (actually a sousaphone). Richard complains to Martin that Patty has no time for him anymore. Martin says he's very happy that Patty has taken up music. Cathy learns that a boy named Eddie Blake (Mathew Anden) got Patty interested. But soon, Patty's incessant practicing starts to annoy the family. Martin still wants to encourage Patty. He won't admit it, but the noise is starting to bother him as well. Martin wants to have a talk with Patty about possibly playing less. Patty tells Martin that she now appreciates the more cultural things in life. Martin can't bring himself to tell Patty. Patty even starts to look down on Richard. Martin and Natalie meet Eddie and find him to be snooty and arrogant. Martin and Natalie try to talk Richard into pursuing Patty, but he's not interested. Cathy comes up with a plan to get Patty to give up the tuba and get back with Richard. But now Cathy wants to take up the flute.
39	3	"Simon Says"	Don Weis	Sidney Sheldon	September 30, 1964	1039
Cathy is having trouble keeping George's interest. She writes to "Simon Says", an advice to the lovelorn column in the school newspaper. The advice she gets drives George completely away. Cathy is upset and wants to find out who "Simon" is, not knowing it's really Patty. At dinner, Cathy discusses with the family what happened when she followed "Simon's" advice. Patty says that maybe Cathy didn't follow it correctly. Cathy gives "Simon" another chance and this advice also doesn't work. Cathy asks Patty to find out who "Simon" is. Soon other girls also have advice backfire on them. Patty asks Pete (John Pleshette), the editor of the paper, to not tell anyone that she is "Simon". The girls come to complain to Pete about "Simon". Things backfire for Patty when Richard takes "Simon's" advice and wants to see other girls. Cathy says she will set a trap for "Simon". Even though the trap doesn't work, the girls find out that "Simon" is Patty. Patty sets out to make amends and Cathy becomes the new "Simon Says". Note: This is the seventh of Kitty Sullivan's 14 appearances in the series, guest-starring as Sue Ellen Turner.
40	4	"Patty, the Organizer"	Stanley Prager	Sidney Sheldon	October 7, 1964	1040
As a class project, Patty, Cathy and Ross organize a union in order to get more benefits around the house. Cathy doesn't think it's a good idea. Patty, as leader of the union, asks for an increase in their allowances. Martin says OK. Martin and Natalie go along with their other demands in exchange for the children doing additional chores. The kids quickly grow tired of the extra work. Natalie wonders if they are pushing the kids to much, but Martin says it's an important lesson for them. Patty comes up with a plan. The kids leave the dishes they were supposed to wash undone. The kids make some more demands, which are turned down. Martin tells Natalie that the kids will come around. They then go on strike. Martin says with no work, their allowance will be cut off. A stubborn Patty insists on holding out by borrowing money from Ross to keep them going. Neither side likes what's going on but neither wants to give in. Martin and Natalie come up with a solution. Patty says she made a huge mistake and dissolves the union.
41	5	"Patty, the Pioneer"	Rod Amateau	Sidney Sheldon	October 14, 1964	1041
Patty's substitute teacher says how easy kids have it now compared to the pioneer days. Patty bets her teacher she can go a whole week living the pioneer lifestyle, using nothing made before 1800. She also informs her parents that Coach Edwards (Joe Silver) has practically picked her to be cheerleading captain at the next big track meet. Patty takes cold baths, has to walk everywhere, and doesn't use anything with electricity. Cathy has to keep an eye on Patty to make sure she doesn't cheat. Patty begins to regret the promise she made, but sticks with it. Alice tells Patty that the coach made her cheerleading captain, because Patty wouldn't be able to get to the track meet 22 miles away. Patty talks to Coach Edwards and insists she can make what seems like an impossible journey to the meet. The day of the meet the family notices that Patty isn't around. They figure she started walking to the meet during the night. They plan to have a party for Patty when she gets home. Patty gets home much earlier then the family figured she would. Patty says that Henry gave her a lift there and back. The family now assumes that Patty gave up on her pioneer bet. Turns out Patty used a horse named Henry to get there.
42	6	"The Boy Next Door"	Rod Amateau	Sidney Sheldon	October 21, 1964	1042
Patty is watching the new neighbors move in. Ross meets the new boy named Keith Gordon (Gary Morgan) and introduces him to Martin and Natalie. Keith goes to get his brother Scott. Scott arrives and Patty is instantly attracted to him. Cathy comes home from the library and tells Patty she met a new boy. Patty tells Cathy that they should double date. Cathy tells Patty that her boy asked her for a date. Patty finds out that the boy is Scott and is now mad at Cathy. She then plots to steal Scott away from Cathy. Patty bribes Ross into getting information about Scott from Keith. Patty now pretends to like many of the same things that Scott does and he takes an interest in her. But, Cathy has a few tricks up her sleeve as well. The girls keep competing with each other for Scott. Patty is expecting Scott and Richard shows up. He was out of town for a while. Patty finds out from Richard that Cathy called him and told him how lonely Patty was. In the end, Cathy prevails because of another trick she pulled and Patty admits defeat.
43	7	"Patty, the People's Voice"	Claudio Guzmán	Arnold Horwitt	October 28, 1964	1043
Patty and Cathy meet one of Martin's acquaintances, T. J. Blodgett (Alan Bunce), who is running for Congress. Teacher Miss Grey (Doris Belack) would like the class to take an interest in the upcoming election. Miss Grey wants the class to also campaign for the person they pick. Patty and Cathy decide they want to back Blodgett. Martin doesn't mind, as long as the girls know where the men stand on things. Martin says Clark Williams, the other candidate, is also a good man. Neither Blodgett nor his campaign manager Mr. Duffy give the girls any real answers about the issues. But they start to campaign for Blodgett. The girls rethink their support after hearing Clark Williams's speech. Patty and Cathy decide to campaign for Williams instead. Martin finds out about the girls supporting Williams and he doesn't mind because of the reason they give. Miss Grey asks the girls to represent their school on the panel show "Youth Must Be Heard", quizzing the two candidates. Blodgett is leading the polls, but the girls questioning changes things and Blodgett loses in a landslide. Martin and Natalie are proud of the girls. In the end, Blodgett realizes he shouldn't have been running anyway. Joe Silver as Man (voice). Judith Lowry as Elderly Lady. Note: This is the first of four appearances of the character T.J. Blodgett in the series (the character later returns in the episodes "Our Daughter The Artist," "Patty, the Candy Striper" and "Patty Leads a Dog's Life").
44	8	"The Greatest Psychologist in the World"	David Butler	Sidney Sheldon	November 4, 1964	1044
Patty receives a letter from Sue Ellen's cousin Kip who invites her to Harvard for a college prom weekend. Her parents won't let her go. At the shake shop, Richard storms off mad that Patty would even think to go with Kip. Cathy suggests using psychology to get her parents to let her go. Patty goes to the library to read some books on psychology. Patty starts her ploys on her parents when she comes home late for dinner and it works. She writes Kip and says she'll go to the prom with him. It works on Richard as well who now wants her to go to the prom as a favor to him. Cathy's worried that Patty still has to get her parents to let her go. Patty hasn't gone out all week and it starts to concern Natalie. Natalie thinks Patty for some reason is avoiding crowds. Her parents now insist she go to the Harvard dance. But then they find out that Patty had out smarted them when they read a telegram from Kip. Her parents then use some reverse psychology on Patty and she decides to not go to the prom. Something Sue Ellen says makes Patty even more sure she doesn't want to go. Patty confesses to Martin that she manipulated him and Natalie and apologizes. She then writes Kip so he can get another date. Note: This is the eighth of Kitty Sullivan's 14 appearances in the series, guest-starring as Sue Ellen Turner; this is also the sixth of John Spencer's seven appearances in the series, guest-starring as Henry.
45	9	"Patty and the Peace Corps"	Claudio Guzman	Sidney Sheldon	November 11, 1964	1045
Patty tells Cathy that she has been accepted into the Peace Corps. She had to lie about her age. Patty says that she will be sent to Africa and will report to the training camp in two weeks. She hasn't told anyone else yet. Patty starts learning Swahili and African customs at home. Patty wants Ross to find her a green salamander. She tells Cathy they are a rare delicacy. Patty can't bring herself to eat the lizard. Cathy hopes Richard can talk Patty out of joining the Corps. Instead, Patty almost talks Richard into going with her. At the shake shop, Tom wants to interview Patty because of the rumor of her joining the Peace Corps. Martin and Natalie learn about Patty's plans after reading the story in the school newspaper. They learn that Patty wants to do something helpful in life. Her parents also find out from Richard that Patty has been doing a lot of local volunteer work. Martin finds a subtle way to talk Patty into staying home. Note: This is the ninth of Kitty Sullivan's 14 appearances in the series, guest-starring as Sue Ellen Turner.
46	10	"How to Succeed in Romance"	Claudio Guzman	Arnold Horwitt	November 18, 1964	1046
Patty tells Richard that she wishes Cathy could get a boy. Cathy comes by and says she's fallen for a new boy, Christopher Hubbard. Later, Cathy tells Patty she's never felt like this before, but she's too shy to talk to him. Patty calls Richard and tells him to set up a meeting at the shake shop. Richard introduces Chris to Patty and Cathy, but things are very awkward between Chris and Cathy. Martin tells Cathy to be more open and direct. Natalie says she should be aloof and mysterious. Ross says to feminine. Patty says that she should be mean to him. Richard sets up another meeting and Cathy is very cold to Chris. She even dances with the waiter at the shake shop. Chris tells Richard that he is crazy about Cathy, but he is shy around girls. Richard says that he needs to be mean toward her. Chris calls Cathy and tells her to meet him at a piano recital at 8 pm. Patty is surprised that he isn't picking Cathy up and has a plan. Cathy shows up late for their date. For the rest of the evening they are very rude to each other. They tell each other off. But then they admit that they had each received bad advice and agree to be themselves. Patty and Richard get into a fight over who was responsible for getting Chris and Cathy together. Marcia Strassman as Gladys. Note: This is John Spencer's final appearance in the series, guest-starring as Henry.
47	11	"Block That Statue"	Claudio Guzman	Arnold Horwitt	November 25, 1964	1047
The school is holding a pep rally for the upcoming football game. Richard, the team manager, introduces Coach Gilbert Tugwell (Sorrell Booke), who gives a rousing speech. That is followed by few words from shy star quarterback Myron 'Rock' Milankovitch. Rock falls for Cathy and asks her to come to the game. She declines his offer as she doesn't know much about football. Rock becomes depressed and it effects his playing. When Richard sees a picture of Cathy in Rock's locker, he knows what the problem is. Patty and Richard ask Cathy to go out with Rock, but she says they have nothing in common. They finally convince her to do it for the good of the school and the team. Cathy and Rock start spending time together. They go to the museum and Cathy learns that Rock once sculpted as a hobby. She talks him into doing it again and he sculpts a bust of her. Rock starts missing practices. Rock tells Tugwell that he decided to give up football and pursue art. Tugwell goes to speak with Martin and the family about getting Cathy to talk Rock into playing again. Martin won't make Cathy do it. Patty pretends to be Cathy and tries to talk Rock into playing. Cathy comes by and Rock realizes he was tricked. He does play the big game and they win. Rock says that is his last game as he's transferring to an art school. Note: Daniel J. Travanti, then known as Dan Travanty, played Rock.
48	12	"This Little Patty Went to Market"	Claudio Guzman	Austin & Irma Kalish	December 2, 1964	1048
After a stock that her father bought for her increases in value, Patty decides to sell stock in a new company: Patty Lane, Inc. Her board of directors consists of Cathy, Richard, and Ross. Richard suggests that their product be some type of food. Cathy has a recipe for apricot jam, so they decide to produce that. They then start selling stock to friends at school and family. Patty gets storeowners to agree to sell "Mother Patty's Preserves". A demand for the product does start happening. Martin warns Patty that overhead costs could cut into profits. Patty talks Mr. Fleming (Heywood Hale Broun) into letting her use his glass bottles for the jam. Because they didn't pay attention, more shares of stock were sold then they actually had. Patty works it out by giving up some of her shares. Patty runs into major problems actually mass producing the jam. All the other stockholders vote to dissolve the corporation. Patty feels bad that her family and friends turned their backs on her. Knowing that it was still a valuable experience for Patty, Martin reimburses all the shareholders. Note: This is the tenth of Kitty Sullivan's 14 appearances in the series, guest-starring as Sue Ellen Turner; this is also the first of Barney Martin's two appearances in the series, guest-starring as Mr. McDonald, the deli owner (he later returns in the episode "Patty the Witness").
49	13	"The Best Date in Town"	Stanley Prager	Sidney Sheldon	December 9, 1964	1049
Patty tells Martin about a really important formal dance that's coming up at school. Martin figures Patty will hit him up for a new dress. Patty mentions how late she'll be out and Martin gets worried. The family finally reveals that it's a father-daughter dance. Patty is really looking forward to the dance. Later Patty mentions how some of the fathers won't be able to make it. At work, Henry Anderson (Dana Elcar) tells Martin that he and the wife will be going on an anniversary trip. Because of that, Martin is being sent to Chicago for a publisher's convention the night of the dance. At home, Patty shows Martin the dress she bought. At first Patty is devastated when Martin tells her he can't go to the dance. But after something that Cathy says, Patty doesn't believe he will actually leave and break his promise. Patty gets all dressed up for the dance. Reality sets in when Martin phones Patty from Chicago. When Martin comes home, Patty is barely speaking to him. Martin finds a way to get back in Patty's good graces. Martin has to break another date with Patty. This time she understands and she pretends she forgot about a date she had with Richard. Martin actually knows she made the date up.
50	14	"Can Do Patty"	Claudio Guzman	Andy White	December 16, 1964	1050
Natalie is upset with Ross for leaving his things all over the house. Natalie tells Cathy that her teacher, Miss McClintock (Rae Allen), thinks Cathy will be voted student of the year. Martin and Natalie complain to Patty that she is constantly avoiding doing things around the house. Martin says she should take the same energy that she uses to avoid doing things and put that towards doing things. Patty decides to become "Can Do Patty". Patty volunteers for several different things at home and at school. Natalie is concerned as the things Patty has volunteered to do, haven't been done yet. Most of the work is actually done by others. Meanwhile, because of her volunteering for things, many of the students start a campaign to make Patty student of the year. Natalie mentions to Martin that Cathy was hoping to be student of the year. Patty continues to volunteer for projects, but then talks her fellow students into doing the work. The students are getting a little tired of it. Martin mentions to Patty that she's been taking advantage of a lot of people. He tells Patty that Cathy was really looking forward to winning student of the year. Patty talks the kids into voting for Cathy.
51	15	"Hi, Society"	Claudio Guzman	Arnold Horwitt	December 23, 1964	1051
Patty tells Cathy that she's fallen for a new boy in school, Woodrow Warren Caldwell III. She found out his name by looking in his briefcase. Patty learns that "Woody" comes from high society. Cathy thinks Patty is being a bit nosey. It's not long before Sue Ellen vies for Woody's attention as well. Patty asks Martin if he had any notable ancestors. Natalie tells Patty that she's collecting things for new neighbor Mrs. Caldwell's (Dorothy Peterson) thrift shop. Patty and Sue Ellen both hope to get in good graces with Mrs. Caldwell by helping at the shop. Sue Ellen does manage to spend some time with Woody. Richard finds out about Patty liking Woody. Richard goes to confront Woody, but changes his mind when he sees that Woody is a Judo expert. Sue Ellen's parents are holding a fundraising formal party to raise money for Mrs. Caldwell's thrift shop. Patty asks Martin to buy her a new dress, but he refuses. Patty decides to use her own money and buy a nice dress from the shop. At the party Patty finds out her dress was Sue Ellen's old formal dress that was donated to the store. When Sue Ellen sees Patty's dress, she tries to embarrass Patty in front of Mrs. Caldwell, but it backfires. Patty learns that Woody has a girlfriend that is arriving soon. Cathy gets Patty and Richard back together. Frances Chaney as Mrs. Parker. Note: This is the eleventh of Kitty Sullivan's 14 appearances in the series, guest-starring as Sue Ellen Turner.
52	16	"Patty, the Witness"	Claudio Guzman	Sidney Sheldon	December 30, 1964	1052
Patty witnesses a hit and run crash at McDonald's store. Cathy says she needs to tell the police. But Patty thinks the car was driven by some gangsters and doesn't want them to rub her out. She describes the driver to Cathy. She also thinks she lost her gold bracelet at the scene of the crime. Mr. McDonald comes by with Patty's bracelet which he found in front of his store. At first she claims it's not hers because she doesn't want to be tied to the scene of the crime. Mr. McDonald says it has her initials on it. Mr. McDonald tells Martin and Natalie that his son-in-law crashed into his store while taking his daughter to the hospital to have a baby. They are OK and his daughter had the baby. Natalie wonders why Patty didn't mention she lost her bracelet. When a census taker comes to the door, he looks like the man Patty described and Cathy now believes Patty. Cathy thinks Patty should tell her parents. Patty has a dream that she's bravely testifying in court. The next day Richard tells Patty about a story in the paper about a local bank robbery. Patty finally tells her parents that she saw a bank robber crash into McDonald's store. Martin tells Patty what really happened. Det. Anderson comes by and asks Patty if she could identify a man walking by McDonald's at the time of the accident. Turns out that man was the real bank robber. Patty does describe him and he is caught. John C. Becher as Judge. Cliff Carpenter as Defense Attorney. Note: This is Barney Martin's final appearance in the series, guest-starring as Mr. McDonald, the deli owner whose daughter was having a baby.
53	17	"Every Girl Should Be Married"	Don Weis	Sidney Sheldon	January 6, 1965	1053
Patty misunderstands a conversation between her parents about matchmaking for Natalie's niece Ann and a young man named David Stone. Patty believes that her parents are trying to marry her off to David. Patty tells Cathy what she heard and Cathy says she has to be mistaken. Natalie tells Martin she has invited David over for dinner. She would like to have him see a nice family setting, because he had rough childhood. Natalie tells Patty to make a good impression. After something that Natalie and Martin say to Cathy, she now believes Patty. Patty and Cathy tell Richard what's going on. Cathy suggests that Patty act as unappealing as possible in order to discourage the marriage. Martin and Natalie aren't home when David arrives. Patty actually finds David attractive. David tells her he's been unsure about marriage. He was raised by his Aunt and Uncle and they fought all the time. Patty tells him that they are not a happy family and they fight all the time. This actually helps his feelings for Ann and he now wants to marry Ann to keep her away from this unhappy family. But Patty believes he's still marrying her. After a conversation with Richard and Patty, David at first thinks Richard and Ann are together. But then he figures out the misunderstanding, but doesn't let on. Another problem arises when David confronts Martin and Natalie about their fighting. Note: This is Frank Sinatra, Jr.'s only appearance in the series, guest-starring as David Stone.
54	18	"The Perfect Hostess"	Don Weis	Arnold Horwitt	January 13, 1965	1054
Martin receives a letter from his cousin Gaylord Lane (George Gaynes) asking if his daughter Betsy (Patty Duke in a triple role) can stay with them on her vacation from boarding school. Before Martin can even respond, Betsy shows up at the door. Patty and Cathy learn that Betsy dates a lot of boys back home. At the Shake Shop, all the boys notice blonde Southern doll Betsy. Cathy's boyfriend George falls for her and takes her on a date. Betsy comes home and says her date with George didn't go that well. But she met another boy. It turns out the other boy was Richard, who goes on a date with Betsy. Patty tells Betsy that Richard is her boyfriend and Betsy apologizes as she didn't know. Betsy begins to like living there and wishes she could stay. She realizes she can't as long as Cathy is living there and hopes to make her want to move. Betsy starts to get Patty and Cathy to resent one another. Cathy and Patty figure out what Betsy is up to. Patty pulls a trick on Betsy and Betsy now knows that the girls are wise to her. Martin has a talk with Betsy and finds out the root of Betsy's problem. Gaylord and his wife Cissy (Frances Heflin) come to pick up Betsy. They tell her that from now on, they will spend more time with her. Don Scardino as Timmy. Scott Glenn as Harry. Note: This is the only episode in the series in which Patty Duke is credited as "guest-star" in the closing credits.
55	19	"Patty Meets a Celebrity"	Don Weis	Sidney Sheldon	January 20, 1965	1055
Everyone at Brooklyn Heights High are excited by the visit of famous alumnus Sal Mineo. Patty believes he's there to discover new talent. Patty thinks she could be discovered. Richard tells her he's there to film some school shots for a show where he plays a teacher. Mr. Layton asks Cathy to show Sal around the school. Patty is upset that it wasn't her that was picked. Patty asks Cathy to get Sal's autograph. Sal asks Cathy where the kids hang out. Cathy arranges for Patty to take Sal to The Shake Shop and show him around. Sal tells her that acting is great but sometimes he just doesn't get any privacy. Sal agrees to do a show at the school. Sal and his manager Colin Harvey come to Patty's house. He asks Patty to try out to star opposite him in the show. The Principal thinks others should be able to try for the part as well. The Director (James Coco) sets up the scene at tryouts. Patty impresses everyone with her dramatic performance. Richard asks Martin and Natalie's advice about Patty. The night of the performance, Patty freezes up and turns a serious scene into a comedic one. The next morning the family is worried about how Patty will feel. Her reaction is not what the family expected. Renne Jarrett as Girl in audience. Note: This is Sal Mineo's only appearance in the series as himself; this is also the first of Kelly Wood's four appearances in the series, guest-starring as Gloria (she later returns in "The Raffle," "What's Cooking, Cousin?" and "Patty, the Chatterbox").
56	20	"The Raffle"	Claudio Guzman	Sidney Sheldon	January 27, 1965	1056
Richard is at the house waiting for Patty, who is late. Ross asks Richard if he's going to marry Patty. Patty comes home and says that the church is having a bazaar and wanted ideas on how to raise money. She suggested holding a raffle. The prize is a date with Richard for dinner at the Starlight Room and tickets to the Broadway smash "The Girl from Paris". To save money, Cathy suggests printing the tickets themselves. 100 raffle tickets are printed. Patty buys 11 herself as she doesn't want Richard going out with anyone else. She then makes sure the other tickets are not sold to very attractive girls. When Natalie and Ross say they can sell some, Patty prints off more. Attractive Gloria tells Patty that she bought 20 tickets from the Shake Shop. Gloria rubs it in to Patty that she now has a better chance of winning than her. Ross then tells Patty he sold his 25 tickets to his Scout Leader's older sister who is a model and her model friends. Patty wants to cancel the raffle. Organizer Mrs. Pollack comes by and tells Patty how happy she is that the tickets are selling so well. Patty sets out to get all the tickets back by taking on her friends' most dreaded chores and doing other favors. She gets back all but two tickets. Cathy asks Patty if doing all that work is worth it. It's the day of the bazaar. Mrs. Pollack announces the winner and it's Richard himself. Richard winds up taking Cathy because Patty has chores to do that night. Marcia Strassman as Adeline. Note: This is Jean Stapleton's only appearance in the series, guest-starring as Mrs. Pollack; this is also the second of Kelly Wood's four appearances in the series, guest-starring as Gloria.
57	21	"Patty and the Newspaper Game"	Don Weis	Sidney Sheldon	February 3, 1965	1057
Patty comes to Martin's office asking for an advance on her allowance. Martin's secretary is sick and he asks Patty if she would work as his secretary after school each day for a week. At first she declines, but then she sees a guy she finds attractive, George Reynolds, reporting to the office to start a job. George was hired by his uncle, Publisher Mr. Smathers, to take some pressure off a stressed Martin. Martin overhears the end of their conversation and believes George is there to replace him. Martin tells Smathers that he doesn't need an executive assistant. At dinner, Natalie can tell that something is bothering Martin. Martin tells her he thinks he's being forced out at the paper. Not knowing how Martin feels, Patty invites George over for dinner. Martin and Natalie are stunned when George comes to the house. After George leaves, Martin and Natalie tell Patty that George is being groomed to take Martin's job. At Natalie's urging, Martin arranges to take the editor job at the Oklahoma City Post. Natalie assures Martin that she doesn't mind moving. Patty confronts George and he explains he's just there to help Martin. George will be taking a job in Paris. Patty tells this to Martin, but he's already signed the contract with the other paper. Martin tells Smathers about the misunderstanding. To teach Martin a lesson, Smathers makes sure that Oklahoma City Post doesn't let him out of his contract just yet. Martin now has to fly back and forth for both jobs. After Natalie assures Samthers that Martin will take a vacation, Smathers gets him out of the other contract. Note: This is Bobby Vinton's only appearance in the series as George Reynolds.
58	22	"Little Brother is Watching You"	David Davis	Ed Jurist	February 10, 1965	1058
Ross's birthday is the next day. Patty and Cathy are trying to hide some presents, but Ross knows what they're doing. Ross is expecting his usual surprise party. Patty talks to the rest of the family and says Ross is too old for a surprise party. They decide to not have a party at all. Patty suggests someone takes Ross to a monster movie. Natalie volunteers Patty. Ross tells his friend Stanley about all the ways the family would get him out of the house before the party. Patty tells Ross about the movie. After she leaves, Ross tells Stanley that's the way they'll get him out of the house this year. Ross makes a list of friends to invite. Because they're not having a party, Natalie decides to have her bridge club meet at the house. Patty takes Ross to the movie. Natalie's friends show up. Stanley comes by with a present and tells Natalie that Ross knows about the party. Natalie now scrambles to organize a party at the last minute. Cathy calls the movie theater trying to get a hold of Patty. At the movie, Patty tries to tell Ross that there is no party. She agrees to be his slave for a month if there is one. When they get home, Patty is the one surprised because everyone is there for the party. Bruce Kirby as Theater Manager.
59	23	"Patty Pits Wits, Two Brits Hits"	William Colleran	Arnold Horwitt	February 17, 1965	1059
Singing duo Patrick and Nigel are performing at Brooklyn Heights High School. They thank Patty for giving them their big break. Patty tells the kids how it happened. In a flashback: Cathy is chosen to host a classical music program on a Brooklyn Heights radio station. At the station, Patty meets Patrick and Nigel. They are very talented but have not gotten anywhere as they need connections. Patty says that she'll talk to her father. Meanwhile, Martin has just written an editorial about how bad the music that teens are listening to is. Patty brings the duo to Martin's office, but he kicks them out. They then get kicked out of several record companies. Patty brings them to Danny Leonard (Phil Leeds), who loves them. Danny runs a small record company and doesn't have enough pull in the business. He will record them if his silent partner Max Whithers likes them. But they have to bring Max a demo record. Ross records one of their songs on tape. Patty ruins the first recording, but the second one turns out great. Danny now says that Max will only put up the money if their song is played on the radio. Patty tries several disc jockeys, but none are interested. Patty uses a little deception to get Patrick and Nigel's song played on Cathy's radio program. That was the break they needed. John C. Becher as Hollis. Stanley Grover as Jimmy. Songs: Chad and Jeremy sing "A Summer Song", "Yesterday's Gone" and "The Truth Often Hurts The Heart". Note: This is Chad and Jeremy's only appearance in the series, guest-starring as Patrick and Nigel, respectively, although they are credited as Chad Stuart and Jeremy Clyde in the closing credits.
60	24	"It Takes a Heap of Livin'"	Don Weis	Arnold Horwitt	February 24, 1965	1060
Miss Tansy (Judith Lowry), from the Brooklyn Heights Historical Society, examines the Lane's house. She determines it to be from the Georgian period and is over 200 years old. Martin does complain that the house is a little worn. Natalie says it's time to do some updating. She thinks they should call French interior decorator Dennis Latouche (David Hurst). Miss Tansy does some more research on the house. She tells Patty and Cathy that their home played an important role in George Washington saving the country. Patty thinks Martin should print a story about their house in the paper. Martin isn't sure about the story, but Mr. Bigelow thinks it's a good idea. Latouche comes by and disagrees with Natalie's suggestion of early American decor. He instead suggests Japanese decor. Ladies from the Historical Society come by. Mrs. Outerbridge, the President, is surprised at some of the sketches Latouche has drawn up. She tells the ladies they must have an emergency meeting. The ladies want to turn the house into a historical landmark so nothing will be changed. Martin thinks it means a plaque on the house. Cathy, Patty and Ross have a disagreement over how to stage a play about the house. Martin learns that they want to take the house for the Historical Society. Martin refuses to sign away the house and Natalie decides against the Japanese decor. Hermione Baddeley as Historical Society Member.
61	25	"Will the Real Sammy Davis Please Hang Up?"	Richard Kinon	Arnold Horwitt	March 3, 1965	1061
Patty had great success at getting a star to appear at last year's school prom. Despite her objection, she gets selected to do the same for this year's prom. Patty asks Martin for help, but as when she asked last year, he says no. Patty goes down to Broadway and tries to find a star that will volunteer. She's wearing a sandwich sign asking for help. Richard is with her and tells her to give up. Sammy Davis Jr. sees her from a window. His manager Mike found out she's looking for someone to perform at her school prom. Sammy decides he wants to help her. Mike tries to talk him out of it. Patty wants to run a full page ad in Variety, but learns she can't afford it. Mr. Brown (Arthur Rubin) from Variety runs a story about Patty's dilemma. Sammy sees the story and calls Patty several times. Patty thinks it's Richard pulling a prank on her. She learns that the prom is a sell out. Patty tells George that they should call off the prom. He tells her she better have gotten a big celebrity. Sammy calls Natalie and tells her he will be at the prom. Not knowing this, Patty tries to go and see Sammy with no luck. A surprised Patty sees Sammy performing at the prom. Sammy thanks Patty. Later, Patty gets a call from Peter Lawford and thinks it's Richard. Albert M. Ottenheimer as Reilly. Susan Anspach as Susan. Songs: Sammy sings "What Kind of Fool Am I?" and "I Got a Woman". Note: This is Sammy Davis Jr.'s and Peter Lawford's only appearance in the series as themselves. This may be the only episode to show Patty in Manhattan rather than a Middle-American suburban setting.
62	26	"Don't Monkey with Mendel"	Richard Kinon	Gary Abrams	March 10, 1965	1062
Patty tells the family that she came in the top percentile on her aptitude test. She wonders what her children will be like. Cathy studied the genetic principles of Gregor Mendel to correctly predict what her guinea pig's babies would look like. She tells Patty that she could control what her future children would be like depending on her selection of a man. Patty asks Richard a lot of questions about his family and ancestors. Not impressed with the answers, she breaks up with him. Patty goes to the gym to scout out some boys. She then goes through school files and finds Rodion Zielinski, the boy with the highest I.Q. He's short and not good looking. Patty falls head-over-heels for her new substitute science teacher, Gregory Noble. To get closer to him, Patty asks his help for a genetics project on a rabbit. Gregory wonders why she asks so many questions about his family genes. Sue Ellen and some of the other girls are upset that Patty is monopolizing so much of Gregory's time. Richard confronts Gregory and the teacher begins to understand what's going on. Gregory tells Patty that her teacher will be coming back soon and he'll be leaving. Gregory agrees to come to dinner when Patty tells him that his rabbit, that she's been keeping, will have her babies soon. That night Gregory arrives. After dinner the rabbit has her babies. They don't look anything like the way Patty predicted. Gregory explains to Patty that you can't predict everything. Patty gets back together with Richard. Doris Belack as Miss Grey. Note: This is Robert Goulet's only appearance in the series, guest-starring as Greg Noble; this is also the twelfth of Kitty Sullivan's 14 appearances in the series, guest-starring as Sue Ellen Turner.
63	27	"Patty, the Practical Joker"	Howard Morris	Sidney Sheldon	March 17, 1965	1063
Patty finds Ross' pet frog in her bed while she's in it. Cathy says it's just a practical joke, but Patty intends on getting even. Patty puts a pail of water over the door hoping to get Ross wet, but gets Martin instead. Natalie tells Martin that it's partly her fault as she told Patty to get back at Ross. Angry at first, Martin tells Patty to not let it happen again. Patty explains to Martin about Ross and the frog. Ross tells Patty he did not put the frog in her bed, it just got loose. A practical joke that Cathy unintentionally gets involved in causes her to be late for a date with Ted (Skip Hinnant). Ted was upset and Cathy wonders if she'll hear from him again. This triggers a series of practical jokes between Patty, Cathy and Ross. One joke causes Cathy to make an embarrassing call to Ted. Patty tries to pull a joke on Cathy and Ross, but it happens to Martin and Natalie. Natalie takes a message from Ted about a date with Cathy for later. Cathy thinks it's another joke and rips up the message. Patty proves to Cathy it's not a joke. But, the practical jokes continue between Patty, Cathy and Ross. Martin gets caught in one again. Martin says it's time to call a truce. Later, Ross' frog gets loose again and winds up in Patty's bed.
64	28	"Patty, the Master Builder"	David Butler	Sidney Sheldon	March 24, 1965	1064
Ross does something to annoy Patty once again. Patty reads a paper Ross wrote for class complimenting her and saying how sweet she is. It goes on to say she would even build a midget derby race car for him. Touched by what he said, Patty decides to actually build the racer. She starts to secretly build the car out on the patio. Natalie mentions to Martin that Patty has been yelling at Ross a lot lately. Natalie notices things missing in the house. She doesn't know that Patty is taking them for the racer. Patty and Cathy are working on the racer. Ross comes by and Patty yells at him to stay away. Martin and Natalie overhear Patty and Martin tells her to be nice to Ross. Patty doesn't want to tell her parents about what she's doing. Martin does find out about the racer and reads Ross' paper. He apologizes to Patty and offers to help. When Ross comes by again, it's Martin that yells at him this time. Natalie finds out about the racer and also yells at Ross to stay away. Natalie helps with the building. Ross decides to run away. But before he can, the family reveals the finished car to Ross. They're all surprised when Ross is unimpressed. It turns out that the paper was written by Ross' friend Nick. They give the racer to Nick.
65	29	"Patty and the Cut Rate Casanova"	Howard Morris	Arnold Horwitt	March 31, 1965	1065
Patty is at the Shake Shop with Richard. While he is at the counter, a boy named Rudy asks Patty to dance. At first she says no, but when she sees how well Rudy dances, she says yes. Richard tries to stop Patty, but fails. The next day, Cathy runs into Richard at the Shake Shop. He's waiting for Patty. Cathy answers the public phone and it's Patty. Patty says she is at the Carlos Palomar Dance Studio, which is owned by Rudy's father. Patty has Cathy tell Richard that she is sick. Richard and Cathy go to a movie together. After the movie, Richard finds out that Patty lied and was with Rudy. They have a fight and Richard says they're finished. The next day Richard calls the house. Patty thinks he's crawling back to her, but he asks Cathy for a date. At first she says no, but after Patty makes a somewhat insulting comment about her, Cathy changes her mind. Patty finds out that Rudy is seeing a lot of other girls. Sue Ellen teases Patty about Richard being with Cathy. Richard, feeling his newfound desirability, asks out a girl named Lola. Now both cousins feel they've lost Richard and they apologize to each other. Each girl pretends to be the other and tells off Richard. Richard then learns that Lola is seeing someone else. Richard eventually apologizes and he and Patty make up. Raúl Dávila as Carlos. Note: This is the thirteenth of Kitty Sullivan's 14 appearances in the series, guest-starring as Sue Ellen Turner.
66	30	"The Daughter Bit"	Richard Kinon	Sidney Sheldon	April 7, 1965	1066
Martin thinks Patty is spending less and less time at home. He feels he is losing touch with Patty and would like to spend more time with her. Martin asks Patty if they could spend the night together, but Patty is going to a slumber party. Even Natalie has something to do that evening. Cathy and Ross each have things to do. The next night, Patty over hears Natalie tell Martin that he needs to rest and he's not getting any younger. Patty decides to dedicate her life to him, since he has done so much for her. Patty cancels her date with Richard and tells him see wants to spend time with Martin. Patty then has a long talk with Martin. Martin tells Natalie how nice of a time he had with Patty. Patty then makes plans to do different things with Martin for each of the nights for the week. It's Saturday and Martin wanted to go play golf. But Patty makes him go to a drag race with her. He soon realizes that Patty is completely dominating his life. Richard even asks Patty if she may be over doing things, but she doesn't think so. Martin doesn't want to say anything to her, afraid he'll hurt her feelings. Patty's friends start to think they need to spend more time with their fathers, much to the fathers chagrin. After something Cathy says, Martin finds a way for Richard to spend more time with Patty. Note: This is the Kitty Sullivan's final appearance in the series, guest-starring as Sue Ellen Turner.
67	31	"Cathy, the Rebel"	James Sheldon	Sidney Sheldon	April 14, 1965	1067
Martin writes an editorial over out-of-control students pulling down a statue at a college. He is upset when a person named "Rebel" writes a critical, insulting letter to the editor in response to his editorial. Plus, mail has been coming to the paper supporting "Rebel". Cathy tells Patty that she is "Rebel" and she didn't know that Martin wrote the editorial. Cathy thinks she should tell Martin the truth, but Patty thinks it will all just blow over. Cathy goes to tell Martin, but then she hears his critical response to "Rebel" that he will publish. Cathy and Patty go to meet Richard and Ted at the Shake Shop. Not knowing Martin wrote the editorial, both boys, and some other kids there, intend to write letters making fun of the editor. Mr. Smathers tells Martin he should meet with "Rebel" and discuss their differences. Cathy decides she can't let Martin know the truth. Cathy tells Patty that she wrote her father and wants to go live with him in Iceland. Someone else writes a insulting response to Martin using the name "Rebel". Patty sets a trap to identify the new "Rebel". Martin is upset that "Rebel" hasn't agreed to meet with him. Mr. Smathers, on the other hand, is thrilled because circulation is way up. Patty's trap works and the family finds out the new "Rebel" is Richard. Martin is not happy and Richard finds out he wrote the editorial. Cathy admits to Martin that she was the original "Rebel" and apologizes. Martin decides he needs to be more open minded. Cathy and Patty are happy when Cathy's letter to her father is returned for insufficient postage. Leslie Barrett as Mailman. Scott Glenn as Waiter.
68	32	"Patty the Folk Singer"	Don Weis	Sidney Sheldon	April 21, 1965	1068
Patty, Cathy and Richard are at The Pink Percolator coffeehouse. They are listening to a folk singer named Memphis. Patty and Cathy are very impressed, but Richard is not. Patty overhears Memphis quiting. She offers owner Mr. Haley (Bruce Kirby) her talents as "Pittsburgh Patty". Patty is home rehearsing when Richard comes by. He can't believe she's serious about folk singing. Patty tells Richard that he can be her manager. Patty auditions and Mr. Haley gives her the job. But after several days at the job, all Patty and Richard are doing is wait tables and cleaning up. Patty hasn't told her parents about the job and Cathy thinks she should. When she hints at it, Martin forbids Patty being a folk singer at the coffeehouse. Patty tells Richard what Martin said. Patty says that tonight will be her last night at the coffee house and then she'll quit. Martin tells Natalie that maybe he was too hard on Patty. Jonathan Harrison comes by to talk to Martin and Natalie about where Patty and Richard are every night. They decide to go to The Pink Percolator. Cathy tries to talk them out of it, but it doesn't work. Mr. Haley lets Patty perform on her last night. While singing, Patty sees her parents and Jonathon. Things don't turn out as bad as Patty thought they might. Note: This is David Doyle's final appearance in the series, guest-starring as Jonathan Harrison, Richard's construction engineer father.
69	33	"What's Cooking, Cousin?"	James Sheldon	Sidney Sheldon	April 28, 1965	1069
Patty mentions to Cathy that Richard has been breaking a lot of dates with her. Richard comes by and breaks the date he had with Patty for Saturday night. Cathy catches him in a mistake he makes with his reason. Gloria calls Patty to borrow a dress and reveals that she has a date with Richard. Patty pretends to not care about Richard anymore. Richard comes by and tells Patty that he likes her more, but there's one thing he can't resist about Gloria. She's a great cook. Over the summer, she studied at the famed Le Cordon Bleu in Paris. Natalie offers to teach Patty how to cook, but it won't be anything as fancy as what Gloria can make. Cathy tells Patty she took a course at Le Cordon Bleu once. Patty asks Cathy to prepare a dinner for her and Richard and Patty would pretend she cooked it. Cathy reluctantly agrees. Cathy gets a call and she has to meet her father's friend, Mr. Honoré (Jean-Paul Vignon) at the airport. She won't be able to make the meal. Patty calls some caterers but they can't help her. Patty decides to just make hamburgers. Cathy tells Mr. Honoré about Patty's problem. He has an elaborate meal sent to her house. Richard arrives. Not knowing about the meal being delivered, Patty is about to confess that she can't cook. Ross stops her by saying the dinner is ready. The next day, Richard tells Patty he's been eating too much rich food. Patty offers to make him some of her hamburgers. Note: This is the third of Kelly Wood's four appearances in the series, guest-starring as Gloria.
70	34	"Take Me Out to the Ball Game"	James Sheldon	Sidney Sheldon	May 5, 1965	1070
The family doesn't pay attention to Ross while he is talking about his little league baseball tryouts. That night, Ross is in his room depressed. Patty finds out from Ross why he is feeling bad. Patty tells the rest of the family that Ross is afraid he won't make the team. She also says that Ross feels the family doesn't care. The family now tries to encourage Ross and they study up on baseball. They even practice with him. Coach Johnson (John Randolph) eliminates all the other pitchers but Ross and Billy Bishop. Ross believes that the Coach will pick Billy. Patty suggests inviting Coach Johnson to dinner, to feel him out. Natalie thinks it might be a little unethical, but she agrees. They don't tell Ross as they want it to be a surprise. It's the night of the dinner. Martin comes home early from a business trip. He is surprised when Coach Johnson arrives and has been invited to dinner. Natalie hired Momatoro (Conrad Yama) to make and serve the Oriental meal. Coach Johnson tells the family that some parents will go to great lengths to get their kids on a team. Ross comes downstairs and is surprised to see the Coach. Ross tells Martin that Coach will think they are trying to bribe him. Martin tells him that Billy's family had the Coach over for dinner the night before. After the Coach leaves, the family feels bad that they interfered. Ross makes the team. Coach Johnson is going on a 6 month vacation and would like Martin to fill in.
71	35	"My Cousin the Heroine"	Don Weis	Sidney Sheldon	May 12, 1965	1071
Martin won't let Patty ride around with Richard on his motorcycle. Patty should be more like Cathy, he says. Just then Cathy comes home soaking wet. She won't tell anyone what happened. Patty keeps pressing her, but Cathy won't say anything. When a reporter calls, Patty finds out that Cathy saved a boy from drowning in a lake. Cathy doesn't want a big fuss made over what she did. In class, Miss Castle (Bonnie Bartlett) announces what Cathy did and asks her to speak about it. More newspapers start calling about Cathy. Patty starts to get jealous of all the attention Cathy is getting. Patty, pretending to be Cathy, meets with Roger (Morgan Paull), the boy who was saved. She tries to find out if Cathy's story was true, which it was. Just then, Cathy walks in the room. An embarrassed Patty leaves. Patty doesn't speak to Cathy for a couple days. Cathy is to get a medal, which she wishes wouldn't happen. Cathy goes to Martin's office and asks him not to write an editorial about what she did. Martin doesn't have a choice. Patty asks Miss Moore (Neva Patterson) for her advice if someone were jealous of someone else. Miss Moore knows Patty's really taking about herself. Patty goes to the lake hoping to find someone to save. But it's her that gets pulled out by a little boy. Patty learns something very important about herself.
72	36	"Patty, the Chatterbox"	Don Weis	Sidney Sheldon	May 19, 1965	1072
Martin comes home early after a tiring day at work. He says it was just so noisy. He complains that Patty never stops talking. Patty says she could go 3 days without saying a word. Martin takes her up on the bet and says he'll give her an extra two weeks allowance if she can do it. Richard drops by and says that Patty has been made captain of the debating team. Patty is determined to go on with the bet. At school, one of Patty's friends mentions the glee club, but Patty just shakes her head no. The next day at school, Miss Blake (Frances Chaney) asks Patty to read her essay to the class. When she refuses, Patty has to write "I will not be stubborn" 100 times on the blackboard. She has to redo it when she misspells stubborn. Richard tells Patty, that because she can't talk, he's taking Gloria to the basketball game. Martin is willing to call off the bet and still pay her, but Patty wants to continue. Ross tells Patty she's the best sister in the world. Richard asks Natalie's advice on how to get Patty to listen to him again. He has something important to tell her. Richard informs Patty that Gloria is trying to get her thrown off the debate team. The debate meeting is at 3:30 and the bet is over at 4:00. At the meeting, Richard tries to get Gloria to push the meeting back to 4:00, but she won't do it. Patty shows up to the meeting, but is it Patty? Patty later develops laryngitis. Note: This is Kelly Wood's final appearance in the series, guest-starring as Gloria.

=== Season 3 (1965–66) ===
No. overall	No. in season	Title	Directed by	Written by	Original release date	Prod. code
73	1	"A Foggy Day in Brooklyn Heights"	Bruce Bilson	Roswell Rogers	September 15, 1965	1073
Patty learns that Sally is calling off her luau because of the weather that night. Patty cons Richard into taking her to a movie that night. Frankie Avalon's rental car breaks down in front of the Lane house. He asks Patty if he can use their telephone. Frankie learns that the next plane he can get will be in 4 to 5 hours. Patty does what she can to keep Frankie at the house. Patty calls Richard and asks him to fix a "friends" car. Richard comes by and Patty doesn't tell him about Frankie. She tells him to take his time fixing the car. Patty wants Natalie to make a fancy meal for Frankie. Patty has to keep other friends from finding out about Frankie. Cathy comes home and twists her ankle when she sees Frankie. Patty stops Ross from calling a friend about Frankie. Natalie and Frankie are looking at a leak under the kitchen sink. Martin comes home and is surprised to see Frankie. Patty is upset when the rest of the family keeps interrupting her time with Frankie. Richard fixes Frankie's car and Patty is disappointed that Frankie can now leave. Frankie kisses Patty goodbye. That night Patty tells Richard she just wants to stay home. While listening to one of Frankie's records, Patty fantasizes that he is there singing to her and they are dancing. Natalie Masters as Mrs. Marlow. Song: Frankie sings "These Are The Good Times" Note: This is Frankie Avalon's final appearance in the series as himself; this is also the first of Robyn Millan's six appearances in the series, guest-starring as Roz (she later returns in the episodes "Operation: Tonsils," "Our Daughter The Artist," "The History Paper Caper," "A Visit from Uncle Jed" and "Patty, the Psychic").
74	2	"Operation: Tonsils"	Bruce Bilson	Theodore Ferro & Mathilde Ferro	September 22, 1965	1074
Natalie takes Patty to have her tonsils removed by Dr. Morgan (Troy Donahue). Patty is hesitant until she sees how handsome he is. After the examination, Patty overhears Dr. Morgan talk with Nurse Bates (K.T. Stevens) about a boat he wants to get. She misunderstands his desire for the boat to be for her. Back at home, Cathy thinks that Patty had to have misunderstood something. Natalie tells Martin that Patty clearly has a crush on Dr. Morgan. Dr. Morgan comes by the house to bring the medicine Patty forgot. Patty thinks he's there to see her. Cathy overhears Morgan talking to Martin about the boat. Cathy now believes that he does like Patty. Richard comes by and Patty tries to tell him that her and Dr. Morgan are now an item. Word gets around to Patty's friends about the Doctor. Monica and Roz think Patty is exaggerating things. At the hospital, Patty discovers his affections were for a boat. Monica and Roz come to the hospital to meet Dr. Morgan. Patty tries to hide on a gurney. An orderly (Ray Kellogg) brings her to an operating room to have her gallbladder removed. Patty dresses up as a nurse with a mask on and gets involved in an operation. She winds up fainting. Richard comes by the hospital and confronts Dr. Morgan about Patty. After some more confusion, Dr. Morgan helps Patty save face with Monica and Roz. Patty comes up with a story to tell her friends as to why she had to break up with Morgan. Natalie Masters as Nurse. Note: This is Troy Donahue's only appearance in the series, guest-starring as Dr. Morgan; this is also the second of Robyn Millan's six appearances in the series, guest-starring as Roz; this is also the first of five appearances of the character Monica Robinson in the series (the character later returns in the episodes "Partying Is Such Sweet Sorrow," "Patty the Diplomat," "A Visit from Uncle Jed" and "Patty, the Psychic"); this is also the first of Laura Barton's two appearances in the series, guest-starring as Monica Robinson, Patty's rival (she later returns in the episode "Partying Is Such Sweet Sorrow").
75	3	"Partying Is Such Sweet Sorrow"	Bruce Bilson	Ed Jurist	September 29, 1965	1075
Patty tells Martin that Monica is throwing a big party and didn't invite Cathy. Cathy tells Patty that she's not upset about the party. Richard gets Cathy invited, but he will have to be Monica's date. Patty is now upset with Richard and refuses to go to the party. Natalie is worried about Patty. Richard tells Patty she has a chance to sing with a band. Patty decides to throw her own party with live music on the same night as Monica's party. The band Patty is to sing with is called The Shindogs and they are rehearsing at Patty's house. Patty can't get anyone to commit to coming to her party. She tells Richard to suggest to Monica that they merge the parties and Patty will throw in the live music. Monica agrees to let the band play but she won't allow Patty over. Patty tells the band to play without her because it could be a big break for them. Richard phones from the party that Monica's uncle Howard Record (Harold Peary) is there and owns Howard Record Company. Patty sneaks into the party pretending to be Cathy. Patty has a confusing conversation with Howard when he asks her questions about England. Richard learns from Monica that the Howard Record Company makes hot dogs. Patty then sings with the band. Monica figures out that it's really Patty singing and not Cathy. Monica tells Patty that her uncle makes hot dogs. Hank Jones as Norman. James Burton as Lead Guitarist. Songs: Patty and The Shindogs perform "Funny Little Butterflies" and "I'm Henery the Eighth, I Am". Note: This is Laura Barton's final appearance in the series, guest-starring as Monica Robinson, Patty's rival; this is also The Shindogs' only appearance in the series, as Duke appeared on Shindig! to perform "Don't Just Stand There," which was one of her two Top 40 hits that year (the other being "Say Something Funny").
76	4	"The Guest"	Bruce Bilson	Sidney Morse	October 6, 1965	1076
Richard's parents leave for a week, so Patty invites him to stay at the Lane house while they are gone. Martin and Natalie are not thrilled, but go along with it. Richard immediately becomes annoying. He eats most of the food. He ties up the bathroom by taking multiple showers back-to-back. He's loud, clumsy and sloppy. Patty tries to defend Richard's actions. Some more destruction happens in the house. When his parents call, Richard tells them how well things are going and that the Lane's are crazy about him. Patty tells Richard that she has a date. He asks her to break it because he'll be home by himself. She still goes on the date. Richard keeps interrupting Patty when she comes home with her date, Freddie (Stuffy Singer). Patty is furious with Richard. Richard overhears how happy Martin and Natalie are that he's leaving the next day. He then overhears Patty and Cathy talking about their displeasure with him. Richard leaves and the family feels bad for what they said. Patty goes to talk to Richard and they get into an argument. Patty tells her parents what happened. They say that being in a relationship is a series of compromises. When the family makes up with Richard, he informs them that his parents will be gone for another week. Richard brings his date Eileen to the house and Patty keeps interrupting them.
77	5	"Our Daughter the Artist"	Gary Nelson	Arnold Horwitt	October 13, 1965	1077
Patty paints a painting at school, but she doesn't like it. Everyone she shows it to compliments the work because they're afraid to give their honest opinion about it. Ross is honest and says he doesn't like it. Martin, however, overdoes the compliments to where Patty believes it to be good. She then frames it and hangs it over the mantle in the living room. At the Malt Shop, Cynthia tries to trade her painting for the 80 cents she owes. Louie (Ronnie Schell), the Malt Shop owner, says he'll cancel her debt if she gets the painting out of the shop. Patty's friends tell her that their parents were all honest about not liking their paintings. Patty brags how her family loved the painting. She tells her friends they can come over any time to see it. But her friends say it's only a matter of time before they get rid of it. T. J. Blodgett (Jerry Hausner) comes by to discuss an article with Martin. Martin tries to get T.J. to take the painting as a gift, but he refuses. Mrs. Marlow (Natalie Masters) comes by to pick up a rocker for the church auction. She compliments a statuette on the mantle. Martin and Natalie think she's talking about the painting. Mrs. Marlow reluctantly takes the painting for the auction. Patty brings her friends to the house and the painting is gone. Patty now believes her friends were right. Martin tells Patty about the auction. Patty is afraid no one will bid on her painting. Richard pays his friends to go and bid. Martin, Cathy, and Ross do the same. The bidding gets out hand and people start to think they really want the painting. T.J. winds up winning, but then he puts it in Martin's office. Hank Jones as Freddy. Note: This is the third of Robyn Millan's six appearances in the series, guest-starring as Roz; this is also the second of four appearances of the character T.J. Blodgett in the series.
78	6	"Patty's Private Pygmalion"	Gary Nelson	Arnold Horwitt	October 20, 1965	1078
During cheerleader try-outs, Patty meets shy and timid Marcia Mason. Marcia's attempt at a cheer doesn't go well and she runs off. Marcia tells Patty and Cathy that she's just a loser. Patty decides to take Marcia under her wing in order to teach her how to be more popular. Patty, with Cathy and Natalie's help, changes Marsha's appearance and teaches her to be more feminine. They get Richard to pay her a lot of compliments. She tells Patty she's never been on a date with a boy. Patty and Richard show Marcia how to act on a date. They then teach her some dance moves. Marcia starts to gain her confidence. The next step is to get Marcia to go on a date. Patty asks Richard to ask Marsha for her first date. Patty becomes annoyed when Richard continues to spend a lot of time with Marcia. Then Patty learns that Richard talked Marcia into running for Class President. This presents a problem as Patty is running for re-election. Marcia senses something is wrong when Patty is a bit rude to her. After a talk with Martin, Patty makes a speech urging the class to vote for Marcia. Marcia wins in a landslide. Note: This is Carolyne Barry's only appearance in the series, guest-starring as Marcia Mason, although she is credited as Carole Shelyne.
79	7	"The Girl from N.E.P.H.E.W."	Gary Nelson	Sam Locke & Joel Rapp	October 27, 1965	1079
Martin has written a newspaper article stating that Interpol Agent David Matson is coming from London, England to visit the Lane family. David is a good friend of Cathy's father and is here for some rest and relaxation. Patty thinks he is here on official business and that Martin will blow his cover. David tells Martin and Natalie that he wants to meet up with Irene Wilson, a woman he knew in London. She now works for a Dr. Harold Phelps. David calls Irene and leaves a message with her answering service. Patty answers a call from Irene, who calls herself "The Lady in White" and says that David should meet her at the doctor's office. Patty and Ross go to the doctor's office. There they hear Irene on the phone saying she won't let David "slip through her fingers this time" and she has to "work fast". Patty now thinks Irene is a double agent. David shows up to the office and he sees Patty and Ross. Patty comes up with a silly reason for her being there. Patty and Ross follow the pair around town. While trying to covertly watch the pair, Patty and Ross get stuck in a parcel delivery truck. David spots Patty and Ross while in a restaurant. Patty tries to warn David about Irene. David gives the pair an elaborate set of tasks to do to make them think they are helping him. While on their mission, Patty and Ross cause a large commotion in a movie theater. David tells Martin and Natalie that thanks to Patty, he was able to propose to Irene. Milton Frome as Movie Manager. Note: This is Murray Rose's only appearance in the series, guest-starring as David Matson.
80	8	"I'll Be Suing You"	Richard Kinon	Mort Green	November 3, 1965	1080
Patty walks outside her house and witnesses a fender bender. Mr. Tompkins (Byron Foulger) jumps out of his car and asks Patty if she saw the other car hit him. She agrees to be a witness that the other driver was at fault. The other driver turns out to be Richard driving his father's car. Patty reluctantly still has to be a witness. Patty asks Martin's advice, but he doesn't quite follow her confusing description of events. Patty and Richard go to Mrs. Tompkins (Helen Kleeb) to try and settle things. They are relieved when Mrs. Tompkins tells them she's not concerned with the damage to the car. She tells them that her husband has suffered serious injuries. They see Mr. Tompkins laying in bed with a neck brace and in obvious pain. Mrs. Tompkins says that they will settle for $10,000 and her lawyer, Mr. Lewis (Ned Glass) will contact them. Martin tells Richard that the insurance company will probably take care of everything. Regardless, Patty doesn't want to testify against Richard. Patty keeps dodging Mr. Lewis' phone calls. When Mr. Lewis finally comes to the house, Patty is wearing glasses and pretends to not see well. But Mr. Lewis catches on. Patty and Richard see Mr. Tompkins in perfect health cleaning his car. He sees them and goes running into the house. Patty figures turnabout is fair play. She pretends to trip on the outside stairs and injure herself. Mrs. Tompkins agrees to drop the case.
81	9	"Patty and the Eternal Triangle"	Gary Nelson	Ben Gershman & Bill Freedman	November 10, 1965	1081
Patty is calling some of her girlfriends to see who's taking them to the upcoming game. Patty tells Martin that Richard asked her to go to the game. She's waiting to answer him to see if any other boy will ask her. Martin tells Patty she shouldn't keep Richard waiting too long. He could lose interest in her and find someone else. Patty says it's impossible that Richard could fall for another girl. But the thought does linger in her mind. Richard comes over and mistakes Patty for Cathy because she's at the piano. Patty decides to pretend to be Cathy and come on to him to see if he can be swayed. Richard takes her for a drive. While parked in the car, Patty continues to come on to Richard as Cathy. He is uncomfortable and keeps talking about the car. The next day, Patty asks Richard what he did the night before and he doesn't mention being with "Cathy". Patty finds a way for Richard to go out with "Cathy" again. After some car trouble, Richard has to go home to change. "Cathy" meets Richard's Mother (Amzie Strickland), who's very much into classical music. Richard's Mother would like "Cathy" to play the piano and things get awkward. Richard and "Cathy" wind up in a fight. Richard runs into the real Cathy and figures out that it was Patty he was going out with. Richard makes Patty think he knew it was her the whole time. Or does he? Hank Jones as Freddy.
82	10	"Sick in Bed"	Bruce Bilson	Ed Jurist	November 17, 1965	1082
Natalie tells Patty that she has a temperature and must stay home from school. Patty is upset because she has important school activities and a jazz concert planned with Richard. A bored Patty keeps annoying Natalie. She tries to find ways to keep herself occupied. Patty continues to run Natalie ragged. Patty plays with make up and actually makes Natalie laugh. Dramatic Society President Bob Holton (Steve Franken) comes over to tell Patty the meeting was a disaster without her. The two rehearse their leading parts in an upcoming play. Bob overacts and winds up leaving the house as part of the scene. Then Freddy comes over to work on a speech for the next debate meet. Martin returns home early and finds a house full of students waiting to see Patty. Martin brings the Doctor (Stanley Farrar) up to Patty's room. The Doctor says she's fine, but when Patty gets up from bed, she faints. Apparently she ate way too many candies that all the people brought. Patty tells Richard to go to the jazz concert with someone else. Richard doesn't feel right about taking someone else, but Patty insists. Later, Richard comes back because he forgot the tickets. Patty meets the beautiful Eve that Richard is taking and regrets telling him to go with another person. Note: This is the first time that the character of Cathy does not appear in an episode.
83	11	"Ross, the Peacemaker"	Bruce Bilson	Ed Jurist	November 24, 1965	1083
Patty and Richard have had a fight and Patty refuses to speak to him. A box of candy arrives at the house and Ross thinks it's from Richard. Patty doesn't want it. Richard calls wanting to speak with Patty. Ross talks to Richard and finds out the candy was sent by another boy. Ross tries to patch things up by tricking Patty into talking to Richard on the phone. This makes Patty even more mad. Patty tells Natalie that the fight is over Richard standing her up at the Shake Shop. Then Patty was told that he was at the library with Cynthia Howard. Natalie says he may have a very good explanation, so Patty decides to work things out. Martin is very busy, but Natalie wants to talk to him about Patty and Richard. Ross then bothers Martin about an advance on his allowance. Ross' friend Eddie (Flip Mark) calls and Ross tells him he couldn't get the money to go to the movies. Richard calls and says he's coming by to pick up a notebook he left there. So Patty will have time to talk to Richard, Ross says he'll hide the notebook. Richard arrives and Patty learns that it was her that forgot the date was at the library. Ross is gone and now the family has to search for the notebook. After an accident, the notebook is finally returned to Richard. But something inside causes Patty to start another fight with Richard.
84	12	"Patty, the Candy Striper"	Bruce Bilson	William Raynor & Myles Wilder	December 1, 1965	1084
Martin's been having rough days at work battling a rival newspaper for circulation numbers. Natalie tells Cathy and Ross not to bring up Martin's work. Martin comes home and they all try to make him comfortable. He just wants peace and quiet. Patty comes home with news that she got a nurses' aid job at the hospital. Martin is trying to get some work done. Patty wants to take his blood pressure and his pulse. Ross gets a splinter in his finger and Patty wants to work on it. Martin then trips over Ross' skateboard and Patty tends to his sprained ankle. Dr. Ralph Fenneman (Stanley Farrar) tells Natalie that Martin's ankle isn't serious. But, because of the stress at work, he recommends some quiet and rest. Dr. Fenneman uses the ankle as an excuse to get Martin to the hospital for a few days. It's also Patty's first day at the hospital. At the hospital, Patty wants to spend her lunch hour with Martin. Because he wants to work instead, he pretends to fall asleep. While making her rounds, Patty meets Prof. Schroeder, a space scientist with an upcoming book of how to colonize the moon. T. J. Blodgett calls Martin and tells him Prof. Schroeder is in the same hospital. Getting the serialization rights to the book would be just what the paper needs. Patty keeps bringing by various patients to keep Martin entertained, but this prevents him from looking for Prof. Schroeder. T.J. keeps pestering Martin about Schroeder. Patty then brings in Prof. Schroeder. Not knowing who he is, Martin insults him and he leaves. Martin hunts him down to apologize. Ronnie Schell as Peter Mason. Milton Parsons as Aaron Peabody. Note: This is the third of four appearances of the character T.J. Blodgett (Willis Bouchey) in the series.
85	13	"Patty Meets the Great Outdoors"	Bruce Bilson	Ben Gershman & Bill Freedman	December 8, 1965	1085
Both Patty and Cathy compete for the attention of Hank, a man painting their neighbor's garage. Hank tells Patty that he goes to Forestry School to become a Ranger and painting is just a summer job. Cathy thinks Patty is trying to find ways to keep her busy so she can't talk to Hank. Patty tells Hank how much she likes forests. Instead of going to the beach for vacation, Patty suggests to Martin they go camping out in the woods. Natalie tells Martin that she's sure the girls are infatuated with Hank. Both girls constantly talk to Hank about the outdoors. Richard comes by and tries to join the conversation that Patty and Hank are having. Martin has thought about Patty's idea and decides he likes it. Natalie thinks it won't go well. Martin wants to have a "dry run" in their backyard. They start setting up their camp. When the phone rings, Martin says that the family has to completely disregard their home. Things immediately go wrong. From trouble starting a fire, the cooked food tasting terrible, everyone's back hurting from sleeping on the ground to Patty getting stuck in her sleeping bag. The next day, Patty accidentally inflates a life raft while inside the tent. Patty then finds out Hank is married to Joan (Kim Carnes) and has a baby. The family are happy to have a real meal indoors. They decide to go to the beach instead of camping. Note: This is James Brolin's only appearance in the series, guest-starring as Hank.
86	14	"Cathy Leaves Home: But Not Really"	Richard Kinon	Sidney Morse & Roy Kammerman	December 15, 1965	1086
Cathy and her friend Cynthia (Beverly Washburn) see an Argentina school exchange program poster at school. Cathy says it may be exciting to go, but the Lane's would never let her. Cynthia reminds Cathy that she is just a visitor and they'd probably be glad if she left. Cathy doesn't believe it. At dinner, Martin makes an innocent remark that makes Cathy think Cynthia was right. Cathy asks the family about going to Argentina. Natalie mentions that Cathy would then be living with strangers. When Cathy leaves the table, Martin says that despite the fact that they don't want her to go, the family should be supportive. Cathy is sad and disappointed that the family acts as though they want her to go. Cynthia calls and Cathy tells her that she is devastated. She regretfully starts the process of going to Argentina. At the office, Cathy meets Colette Daiute, who won Miss Teenage America. Colette says that her family was completely against her wanting to apply to the exchange program. The Latin Man (Don Diamond) there tells Cathy she'll be sent to a remote part of Argentina. It will be perfect to learn the culture there as opposed to a big city. Patty and Ross look up things about Argentina that would be reasons for Cathy not to go. Martin still thinks they should support Cathy's decision. Something Cathy does makes Martin and Natalie realize that she doesn't really want to go. Martin forbids her to go because the family would miss her too much. Cathy pretends to be disappointed, but is thrilled inside. At school, Patty hopes Doug (Stuffy Singer) will ask her out, but he asks Cathy instead.
87	15	"The History Paper Caper"	Richard Kinon	Joseph Hoffman	December 22, 1965	1087
Patty's history grades have not been good. Martin informs her that if she doesn't bring her grades up, she is grounded from dating for two weeks. She has to do better to get into a decent college. At school, a boy bumps into Patty and they both drop their books. Patty learns from Roz that the boy is a new student named Henry. He is apparently very smart and is great with history. Patty starts to befriend him. While he's very smart, he's also very clumsy. Henry agrees to help Patty with her paper. That night Patty and Henry start working on the paper. Richard comes by and Patty makes him spend time with Martin. At school, Richard asks Patty why she's spending time with Henry. She says that because he's new here, she's helping him to adjust. Henry winds up basically writing the paper for her. That night, Henry brings the paper to Patty's house. Things get complicated when both Richard and Henry are there and she has to juggle time between them. Henry figures out that Patty basically used him, tears up the paper and leaves. Martin finds out from Richard what happened. Martin tells Patty, good or bad, she has to do the work herself. After she turns in her own paper, Henry comes by, apologizes and gives her a paper he wrote for her. Richard offers to switch papers for her, but Patty tears up Henry's paper. Note: This is the fourth of Robyn Millan's six appearances in the series, guest-starring as Roz.
88	16	"A Very Phone-y Situation"	Gary Nelson	Sam Locke & Joel Rapp	December 29, 1965	1088
Patty ties up the phone so much that no one can call in or out. Martin comes home and accuses Natalie of being on the phone. He feels bad when he learns it was Patty. When Martin misses an important news story because of a missed call, he holds a meeting with the kids. He tells them they can use the phone 5 minutes for each friend, between 7-8 pm. Just as Martin finishes his talk, Patty uses the phone to tell her friends about the new rule. When Martin starts limiting incoming calls, Patty tells the others they need to do something. Martin later agrees to have another phone line installed just for the kids. But the children must come up with the $20 deposit required and then pay the bills themselves. Patty asks Martin to lend them the money, but he tells her to earn it themselves. Patty gets a job, ironically, as a telephone salesperson for the Jet Set Reducing Belt. Just one sale will earn her the $20. Cathy, from a payphone, and Ross, from Eddie's house, also make sales calls. Natalie tells Martin he could pay for the phone, but he refuses. Making a sale is harder than they expected. Patty even tries to sell a belt to Natalie. Jack (Jonathan Hole) and Harriet Ralston (Peggy Rea) come by to play cards. Patty sees Harriet as an easy sale. Things go wrong when Patty uses a defective belt that Ross was going to fix. And Martin's attempt at a hidden phone doesn't last long. Tommy Farrell as Jim.
89	17	"Ross Runs Away, But Not Far"	Gary Nelson	William Raynor & Myles Wilder	January 5, 1966	1089
Natalie is going with Martin to a newspaper conference. She is worried about leaving the kids for the weekend. Martin tells her that Patty is capable of handling things. Natalie gives the kids some last minute instructions, but Martin wants to get going. Ross has invited his friend Billy over for a game of chess, but Patty tells him to clean his room first. Patty finds out that Ross didn't clean his room. Billy tells Ross that if Patty keeps hounding him, he should tell her he's running away. Patty comes back and takes away the chess board. When Ross says he's leaving, Patty says that's OK with her. Both think the other is bluffing. Cathy thinks Patty is being too hard on Ross. Ross pretends to leave. Natalie calls and wants to speak with Ross. Patty opens the front door and there he is. Ross promises to not tell their parents how Patty treated him if she becomes his slave. The next morning, Patty brings Ross breakfast in bed. He forces her to make something else. Something Cathy says gives Patty an idea. When Ross threatens to run away again, Patty handcuffs the two of them together. Ross informs her he lost the keys. Martin calls and asks Patty if Ross has cleaned up the basement. Patty and Ross have to work together to clean things up, but it doesn't go well. The two come to an understanding, make up and free themselves from the handcuffs.
90	18	"Poppo's Birthday"	Charles Barton & Gary Nelson	Sam Locke & Ed Jurist	January 12, 1966	1090
Martin's birthday is coming up. Patty doesn't have that much money, so she suggests the family pitch in to buy him a present. Patty also has to subtly find out what he wants. Martin realizes what Patty is up to and tells Jim Frazer. Something Jim says gives Martin an idea. Martin decides to help by hinting he wants an affordable Swiss pocket knife. He tears an ad for the knife out of a hunting magazine which Patty finds. But Ross sees an ad for a $99.50 telescopic rifle on the other side and figures that is what he wants. Patty and Ross try to get more money from Natalie. Because of something Natalie lets slip, Martin figures out about the rifle. Martin overhears Natalie and Patty trying to figure out how to get more money. Natalie tells Patty she'll return a coat she just bought. Martin wants to help them pay for the gift. Something Jim says gives Martin another idea. He hides some money in the back yard. His plan backfires when Patty finds the money, but wants to turn it in to the police. Martin tells Patty he'll turn the money in. More confusion follows when Patty goes to talk to a Police Sergeant (Ken Lynch) and the money isn't there. Martin winds up getting something from Patty that is better than any other gift.
91	19	"Anywhere I Hang My Horn Is Home"	Gary Nelson	Arnold Horwitt	January 19, 1966	1091
While conducting a survey, Patty meets a down and out trumpet player named Gate Garrison (Dick Gautier). Gate tells Patty that ever since his band's singer Mona left, they haven't been able to get a job. The landlady comes by and tells Gate his rent is nine weeks overdue. Patty feels sorry for him and invites him to dinner. The family has a hard time understanding all the slang phrases Gate uses. Martin learns that Gate is currently unemployed. Natalie mentions she had her diamond pin reset. Gate says that he had spent some time in an Army jail. When Gate gets up from the table, he hurts his back. Gate becomes a house guest. The next morning Gate tries to help Natalie peel some potates, but makes a mess of things Gate's practicing the trumpet annoys Martin while he's trying to write an editorial. Gate then tries to repair Martin's typewriter and tune the family piano. Neither goes well. Martin gets Gate's band a job, but Gate turns it down because it's not the kind of music they play. Martin is about to kick Gate out, but Gate is already packing. Gate hurts his back again. Natalie can't find her pin. Martin becomes suspicious when Gate shows up with a new suit and says his band got a job. Patty tries to cover up for Gate by saying she wore the pin and lost it. Before Gate leaves, he says he found Natalie's pin in his room.
92	20	"The Greatest Speaker in the Whole Wide World"	Gary Nelson	Sidney Sheldon	January 26, 1966	1092
Patty has volunteered Martin to be a guest speaker for Mrs. Donovan's (Sara Seegar) creative writing class. Martin says he can't get away from the office on Monday morning. Martin tells Patty that she can't make commitments without checking with the person first. Patty tells Richard that Martin will make the speech and even bets him. After Richard speaks with Martin, he accepts Patty's bet. Natalie, Cathy and Ross each try to change Martin's mind to no avail. Mrs. Donovan tells Patty how much she is looking forward to Martin's speech. Martin does change his mind and starts rehearsing the speech. He tells Natalie that he'll even have a reporter from the paper there to do a story about it. Before he can tell Patty, she tells him she invited a rival editor to speak to the class instead. She didn't really, but she hopes that will change his mind. The plan backfires, as Martin is now furious that he will be a laughing stock at the paper. Martin will have his reporter still cover the speech, but to make his rival look bad. Patty realizes she has no speaker and has caused a newspaper war. Richard feels bad for Patty and cancels their bet. The day of the speech, Cathy speaks with Martin. In class, Patty starts to tell everyone that Martin won't be there. Just then Martin shows up and gives the speech. Things going right gives Patty a swelled head. Bobby Diamond as The Waiter.
93	21	"Big Sister Is Watching"	Bruce Bilson	Sidney Sheldon	February 2, 1966	1093
Ross comes home with a black eye. He got into a fight with a new student named Jerry Mitchell. Ross isn't even sure how it all started. Jerry's older brother Alan comes by to apologize for what happened. Patty instantly falls for Alan. Ross can't believe it when Patty tells Alan that Ross probably started the fight. She tells Alan that she's sure Ross and Jerry will become friends. Alan tells Patty that he races sports cars and he'll take her for a ride sometime. Patty wants Ross to apologize to Jerry. Jerry starts another fight with Ross and blackens his other eye. Cathy asks Richard to teach Ross how to defend himself. Patty calls Alan and keeps hinting about getting together. Alan doesn't seem that interested in her at all. Jerry fights with Ross again and Richard's training didn't help. Richard keeps trying to help, but Ross keeps getting beaten up. Richard and Alan get into a fight and Richard loses. Patty feels bad for Richard. She tells Alan to leave and never come back. When Patty later confronts Alan, she comes home with a black eye.
94	22	"Patty Leads a Dog's Life"	Bruce Bilson	Sam Locke & Joel Rapp	February 9, 1966	1094
Patty needs $10, but Natalie tells her to not bother Martin. The Lanes are having Martin's society columnist Eloise Sutton (Reta Shaw) over for dinner. Her contract is up for renewal and Martin is afraid they will lose her. Martin says that Eloise is bringing her spoiled little dog Pierre. After dinner, Eloise mentions how she will hate to leave Pierre in a kennel while she's away on an assignment for four days in Palm Beach. Eloise says she would gladly pay someone to stay with Pierre. Patty hears this, and as she is in need of money, she volunteers. Natalie is not happy about the idea. Eloise gives Patty a very long list of instructions for the dog. Patty soon learns that taking care of the dog is harder than she anticipated. Pierre can only be calmed down when Martin sings "Rock-a-Bye-Baby" to him. At the office, Martin tells T. J. Blodgett that he thinks Eloise will renew her contract. Martin believes this because of the favor Patty is doing for her. Patty calls Martin and he has to sing to the dog while still in T.J's office. Right after Natalie tells Martin that Eloise has come home early, Ross tells the family that Pierre got out of the house. While Martin keeps Eloise occupied, Patty looks for Pierre. Patty finds him in a pipe and she gets stuck trying to get him out. With the help of a Little Boy (Ted Quinn) and the Fire Department, Patty gets Pierre home before Eloise knows anything went wrong. Eloise does sign the contract. Songs: Patty, William, Paul and Reta each sing "Rock-a-bye Baby". Paul sings "My Old Kentucky Home". Note: This is the final appearance of the character T.J. Blodgett in the series.
95	23	"Too Young and Foolish to Go Steady"	Bruce Bilson	Arnold Horwitt	February 16, 1966	1095
Patty and Richard are at the Ice Cream Parlor and talk about how lucky they are to have each other. Cynthia tells Patty that the new football captain, Roddy Dawson, is dying to date her. But Roddy won't ask Patty because of Richard. Patty then tells Richard they're too young to go steady and breaks up. Cathy suspects that Patty has another reason for breaking up with Richard. When word gets around that Richard is available, Cynthia and a bunch of other girls flock around him. Patty then finds out that Roddy actually has a girlfriend. Richard comes by to return a history book. He mentions to Patty about all the girls he's dating. In order to save face, Patty invents a new boyfriend named Keith Caldwell. She mentions how rich and talented Keith is. Later, Cathy tells Patty that none of the other boys will ask her out because they heard how great Keith is from Richard. Richard and Cynthia look forward to meeting Keith. Patty keeps her web of lies going until she almost gets caught by Richard and the others. After speaking to Martin and Natalie, Patty confesses to Richard that there is no Keith. He thinks she did it to make him jealous and they get back together. Later, there's a call from a Mr. Caldwell and Patty thinks it's Richard having some fun. Patty tells who she thinks is Richard off. Turns out Martin was expecting a call from a Senator Caldwell. Bobby Diamond as Louie. Ray Kellogg as Guard. Rita Walter as Nicki.
96	24	"Patty the Diplomat"	Richard Kinon	Sidney Sheldon	February 23, 1966	1096
Patty receives a registered letter from Russia. She then recalls a past civics assignment where the class had to write to a government official. She had written to Kosslinko, the head of the Russian presidium. Harold Raney (Mike Road), of the state department, arrives at the Lane house. He heard about the letter and would like to see if he can garner any valuable intel from it. The letter was written in Russian, so Patty doesn't know what it says. Raney takes the letter and says he'll return it after it's been further analyzed. Patty wants to know what it says, but Raney, who reads Russian, says he'll tell her later. Raney doesn't want Patty to tell anyone about the letter. He also says they'll decide how she'll respond to it. It's not long before Patty starts to think that Raney could be a spy. Raney comes back the next day and says that the letter states a wish for friendship between the countries. He also has a letter for her to sign as a response. Patty doesn't think the letter has her touch, so she re-writes it adding teen lingo. Her Teacher (Natalie Masters) asks Patty to talk to the class about the letter she received. Patty tells them she's working with the state department and can't talk about it. Patty tells the family she wants to be a diplomat. Her friends start making fun of her because they don't believe there ever was a letter. Patty decides to call Kosslinko directly and have Ross record it. Raney comes by to translate the call and tells Patty she was talking to information and got the time of day. Jerry Hausner as Mr. Darren the Mailman. Note: This is the third of five appearances of the character Monica Robinson; this is also the first of Kathy Garver's three appearances in the series, guest-starring as Monica Robinson, Patty's rival (she later returns in the episodes "A Visit from Uncle Jed" and "Patty, the Psychic").
97	25	"Do You Trust Your Daughter?"	Gary Nelson	Ed Jurist	March 2, 1966	1097
Martin is shocked when he opens the door for Ronald Dawson (Steve Franken), a 20-something man who says he has a date with Patty. Martin is concerned about his age, but Natalie isn't. Ronald wants to take Patty to a club in New Jersey, so they might be late coming home. Natalie thinks Patty is old enough but Martin insists on her usual midnight curfew. Patty talks Ronald into going to a movie instead and then they talk in his parked car. Patty is worried about the time and she's a little bored with Ronald's conversation. It's almost midnight when two men from the Diamond Loan Company show up. Ronald is three months behind on payments and the men repossess his car. Patty asks the lead man (Frank Gerstle) to drop her off at her house. Patty is home before midnight, but a set of circumstances leads Martin to believe she was very late. The next morning an angry Martin confronts Patty. She insists she was in bed by midnight and he insists she wasn't. Patty tries to explain, but Martin cuts her off. Patty is hurt that Martin thinks she's lying and that he doesn't trust her. As punishment, Patty is to have no dates for two weeks. Patty had made a date with Richard to go dancing that evening. She made the date a long time ago and intends on keeping it. Patty and Martin get into an argument when he refuses to let her go. The divide between to two deepens until Patty explains what happened. Martin, realizing he was wrong and should have trusted Patty, apologizes.
98	26	"A Visit from Uncle Jed"	Gary Nelson	Arnold Horwitt	March 9, 1966	1098
Patty reads a letter from Cathy who is spending time with her father in Paris. Cathy sends Patty an original Paris dress. When Richard comes by, he doesn't even notice the new dress Patty is wearing. Patty suggests to Roz and Monica that they have a formal dinner party so she can show off her dress. Roz and Monica then say it will be at Patty's house. Natalie agrees to have the party at the house. But instead of hiring a chef, Natalie will do the cooking. Uncle Jed (William Schallert) drops in for a surprise visit. Patty is worried that Jed will interfere with her dinner party. It's the day of the dinner party. An attempt by Martin to have Jed visit another relative who lives close by fails. When Jed finds out about the party he insists on playing his banjo as entertainment. The problem is that Jed is not a very good banjo player. Patty finds a way to have Jed stay in his room during the party. But then a power outage hits Brooklyn Heights right before the party. Jed's old fashioned ways saves the dinner party. Later, the power comes back on, but everyone prefers the lights off. Songs: The party guests all sing "Skip To My Lou", "When the Saints Go Marching In" and "While Strolling Through The Park One Day". Note: This is William Schallert's final dual role in the series and his only appearance in the series as Uncle Jed; this is also the fifth of Robyn Millan's six appearances in the series, guest-starring as Roz; this is also the fourth of five appearances of the character Monica Robinson in the series; this is also the second of Kathy Garver's three appearances in the series, guest-starring as Monica Robinson, Patty's rival.
99	27	"Patty, the Psychic"	Gary Nelson	Sidney Sheldon	March 16, 1966	1099
Patty is reading a book about experiments with ESP. She will go out of the room while the family concentrates on a random object. When she comes back she will be able to guess the item. Cathy talks the others into going along with what ever Patty picks. After Patty picks the object, the doorbell rings and Patty says it will be Alan Bruster for Cathy. It does turn out to be Alan dropping off a book for Cathy. Martin tells the family it was just a coincidence. Even after Cathy tells her they played a trick on her, Patty still believes she's psychic. Patty starts to give psychic readings with students at school. Detective Lt. Gregory (Ken Lynch) comes by to speak to Patty about illegally operating a fortune telling business. Patty is cleared when she says that she isn't taking in any money. The Detective gets excited when Patty tells him he's going to get the promotion he was hoping for. Just then Madame Olga (Elvia Allman), a self-proclaimed famous psychic, comes by. She flatters Patty and asks her to come to her parlor. At the parlor, Patty finds out the tricks Madame Olga uses to make people believe in her. Madame Olga wants Patty to tell her about her friends problems and have them come by the parlor. Mr. Ryan (C. Lindsay Workman), the Principal, tells Patty he is concerned with her psychic readings with the students. Martin knows, but not the rest of the family, that Patty is actually working with Lt. Gregory. The sting operation gets quite complicated, but Madame Olga is eventually arrested. Note: This is Robyn Millan's final appearance in the series, guest-starring as Roz; this is also the final appearance of the character Monica Robinson in the series; this is also Kathy Garver's final appearance in the series, guest-starring as Monica Robinson, Patty's rival.
100	28	"Don't Bank on It"	Harry Falk, Jr.	Phil Sharp	March 23, 1966	1100
Martin is working on an important speech, but he is constantly interrupted by Patty catching up on her chores. He tells her that it would make more sense if she just did the chores when they came up. Martin's secretary sends over by mistake money given from readers for the Fresh Air Fund. He asks Natalie to go to the bank, but she can't. He then asks Patty to take it to the bank to deposit and hurry because the bank closes soon. On the way to the bank, Richard stops Patty with a trivial question. This causes her to not get to the bank before it closes. Patty hides the money in a book. When Martin asks Patty if she made it to the bank on time, she implies that she did. While mentioning to Natalie that Ross needs to return a book to the library, Martin finds the money in it. Martin realizes that Patty didn't make it to the bank on time. He's a little upset that she didn't tell him. When Patty later looks for the book, Cathy tells her that Ross returned it to the library. At the library, Patty learns that the book has been checked out. With Richard's help, Patty tracks the book to a Mrs. Higglemyer (Hazel Shermet). Mrs. Higglemyer thinks that Patty is the babysitter, but then the real one shows up. Patty is able to sneak the book out, but the money isn't in it. Patty is about to tell Martin the truth when she sees and takes the envelope with the money on his desk. Cathy tells Patty to use the bank's night deposit. A panicked Martin is now looking for the envelope. Patty tells Martin what she did. He is relieved but still punishes Patty by making her listen to his speech.
101	29	"Three Little Kittens"	Harry Falk, Jr.	Ed Jurist	April 6, 1966	1101
Ralphie (Clint Howard), son of the vegetable store owner (Herb Ellis), comes by to see Patty. He has three kittens he's trying to sell since his mother won't let him keep them. Ross knows that wealthy neighbor Mrs. Barton is looking to buy some cats. He gets Patty to buy the kittens and they'll sell them for a profit. But it turns out Mrs. Barton is looking for Persian cats. Patty and Ross decide to put an add in the newspaper and hide the cats in the basement for the time being. Martin takes a call from a man (William Christopher) about the kittens. Martin thinks he's talking about the women in the house. Turns out Ralphie's father didn't want the kittens sold. Patty and Ross were going to sell the kittens back to him, but one is now missing. Cathy, meanwhile, has found it and taken it in. Ross makes a deal with Ralphie for the two kittens. Another cat sneaks away and Natalie finds it. She tells Martin having a cat would help teach Ross responsibility. Martin then finds the third cat. Martin, Natalie and Cathy each want to keep the kitten they found. Ralphie and his father come by wanting the cats back. They work out a deal where the Lane's get to keep one of the cats.
102	30	"Fiancee for a Day"	Harry Falk, Jr.	Ed Jurist	April 13, 1966	1102
Patty and Richard had dinner at Sally (Judy Carne) and Bob's (Ronnie Schell) apartment. They are married friends who are a year older than them. While sitting in Richard's car, he tells Patty he's afraid they will lose touch when they graduate. Richard proposes and Patty accepts. When she gets home, she tries to tell Martin, but can't. The next day Natalie finds a book about being a nurse in Patty's room and thinks that may be what she wanted to talk to Martin about. Patty is surprised and happy when her parents completely support what she wants to do. Then she finds out they're talking about being a nurse. Patty still can't tell her parents the truth. Richard tells her he couldn't say anything to his parents either. Patty doesn't tell Richard that she didn't tell her parents. Patty dreams about being a happy housewife with children. Patty talks with Sally and finds out the reality of marriage. She now has a dream about being a poor and struggling housewife. Martin and Natalie tell Patty that they now think her and Richard want to get married. Patty tells them that's ridiculous. After talking with Bob, Richard now second guesses getting married. Later, Bob tells Richard and Patty that Sally is going to have a baby and that marriage is great. But they decide to call off the engagement and wait. Patty and Richard get into an argument over who is more mature. Note: This episode's summary is written into the 1999 TV movie The Patty Duke Show: Still Rockin' In Brooklyn Heights, with Patty and Richard later having a son, who, in turn, has a daughter and are amicably divorced (though towards the end of the movie, they reconcile).
103	31	"The Invisible Boy"	Gary Nelson	Clifford Goldsmith	April 20, 1966	1103
Patty is excited about Chuck Farrel (Stuffy Singer), a boy from school. Patty tells Cathy that Chuck is very shy, but she finally got him to talk to her at school. She notices that his car has broken down in front of her house. Patty talks to him with his upper half hidden underneath the car while he's working on it. He would like to go to the beach hangout Ga-Ga-A-Go-Go but has too many chores. Patty assumes Chuck wants to take her, though he hasn't actually asked her. Chuck wonders if he could hire Ross to mow his lawn. Patty asks Ross and he's not interested. Patty tries to think of someone else to mow the lawn. Ross asks Martin if he could drop French class because he's the only boy in it. Patty says she'll talk Martin into letting him drop the class if Ross cut's Chuck's lawn. Chuck's neighbor, young Penelope Fowler, is constantly bothering Ross while he tries to finish the lawn. Patty brings Ross some lunch. She goes to talk to Chuck and he's under the car again. Patty keeps hinting at going dancing that evening. Back at home, Patty still tries to get Martin to agree to Ross dropping the class. Because of Penelope, Ross destroys parts of the yard and soon he just leaves. Patty still doesn't know what Chuck's plans are. Penelope made Ross ask her to a movie that night. Because of Penelope, Ross decides to stay in French class. Chuck comes by to pick up Patty. Note: This is Diane Mountford's only appearance in the series, guest-starring as Penelope Fowler.
104	32	"Do a Brother a Favor"	Gary Nelson	Sidney Sheldon	April 27, 1966	1104
Ross befriends Harold Wilson, an older guy at school. Harold is president and the best player on the exclusive Tigers basketball club. Ross hopes to play for the team. Harold says he'll nominate Ross into the club as a water boy and will take him under his wing. Harold would also like to meet Patty. Patty tells Martin she wants to get a job for the summer and suggests working at his paper. Martin says there are no job openings at the paper. Ross introduces Patty and Martin to Harold. Harold tries to high pressure Patty for a date, but she turns him down. Harold now has no interest in helping Ross. Ross blames Patty for him not getting into the club. Patty agrees to see Harold until the voting is done. She makes herself as unattractive as possible for their first date. He still finds her pretty. Patty comes up with several other plans to get Harold uninterested in her, but none work. Meanwhile, Eddie asks Ross to join a club he's forming, but Ross turns him down. While explaining things to Richard, Harold overhears Patty's scheme and leaves angry. Richard tells Patty that Harold's father owns the record shop that Patty was going to try and get a job at. Ross comes home and tells Patty he's been made president of Eddie's club and he no longer cares about the Tigers. Note: This is Aron Kincaid's only appearance in the series, guest-starring as Harold Wilson; this episode also serves as the series finale, as ABC and United Artists could not come to an agreement over the cost of filming the series in color (according to Duke's autobiography, Call Me Anna, had United Artists not been so cheap and agreed to let ABC not only keep the series in Brooklyn Heights, but also begin filming the series in color, the show might have continued for at least a couple more years).
