= Candy Matson =

Radio program

- Other names: Candy Matson, YUkon 2-8209
- Genre: Detective drama
- Running time: 30 minutes
- Country of origin: United States
- Language: English
- Home station: KNBC
- Syndicates: NBC West Coast
- Starring: Natalie Masters
- Announcer: Dudley Manlove
- Written by: Monty Masters (Monty Mohn)
- Directed by: Monty Masters
- Produced by: Monty Masters
- Original release: June 29, 1949 – May 20, 1951
- Opening theme: Candy

Candy Matson was a radio program on NBC West Coast that aired from June 29, 1949, to May 20, 1951. It centered on Candy Matson, a female private investigator with a wry sense of humor and a penthouse on Telegraph Hill in San Francisco. The program was notable for having a striking female character "without a trace of squeamishness" as well as a veiled camp gay character in Candy's best friend Rembrandt Watson, voiced by Jack Thomas. Candy's love interest was police detective Ray Mallard, voiced by Henry Leff. The announcer was Dudley Manlove. Actors frequently heard in minor roles were Helen Kleeb, John Grober, Mary Milford and Hal Burdick. In addition to the show being set in San Francisco, it was produced at Taylor & O'Farrell Streets in NBC's San Francisco Radio City.

The series concluded with a twist ending when Ray finally proposed to Candy, who accepted and retired from the detective business.

It was created by Monty Masters (Monty Mohn) and starred his wife Natalie Parks as Candy Matson. When Monty Masters created the show, he planned to star in it himself, as a male private detective. His mother-in-law convinced him to change the lead to a female, which led to his wife being the star.

In 1950, Candy Matson was recognized with the San Francisco Examiner's Favorite Program Award. The award was presented as part of the broadcast of the episode "Symphony of Death".

The aftermath of a 1950 episode illustrated the program's popularity. A newspaper story related: "It seems that during the closing moments of the last Monday's sequence, Candy is in an aircraft repeating the 'Twenty-third Psalm' as the plane crashes into a lake. At that point the show ends. And at that point the switchboard at Radio City started lighting up like a Christmas tree. More than 800 calls were received shortly after the program signed off. All of them wondering what happened to their heroine."

Only 14 of the 92 episodes survive, along with the April 1949 audition show and the September 1952 series revival audition show.
