= Helen Kleeb =

American actress (1907–2003)

- Kleeb in The Waltons, 1977
- Born: January 6, 1907; South Bend, Washington, U.S.
- Died: December 28, 2003 (aged 96); Los Angeles, California, U.S.
- Resting place: Holy Cross Cemetery, Culver City, California
- Occupation: Actress
- Years active: 1952–1997
- Spouses: John Gerald Prendergast (m. 1937; died 1950) Elmer Garrison (m. 1959)
- Children: 1

Helen Kleeb (January 6, 1907 – December 28, 2003) was an American film and television actress. In a career covering nearly 50 years, she may be best known for her role from 1972 to 1981 as Miss Mamie Baldwin on the family drama The Waltons.

== Early life ==
Kleeb was born in South Bend, Washington, the daughter of Mr. and Mrs. A. W. Kleeb. Her father worked in the lumber business there, and she said, "We were very poor." Although she saw no theater as a child, she created acts from material she found in library books and performed for "Rotary, Kiwanis, or any other club or organization that would let me get up in front of them and do my act". Her career dreams were settled when her grandparents took her to a Chautauqua — her first exposure to a theatrical production. Upon graduating from high school she told her parents that rather than going to college she wanted to study at the Ellison-White Conservatory of Music in Portland. Her mother wrote a check and she rode a bus to there.

== Career ==
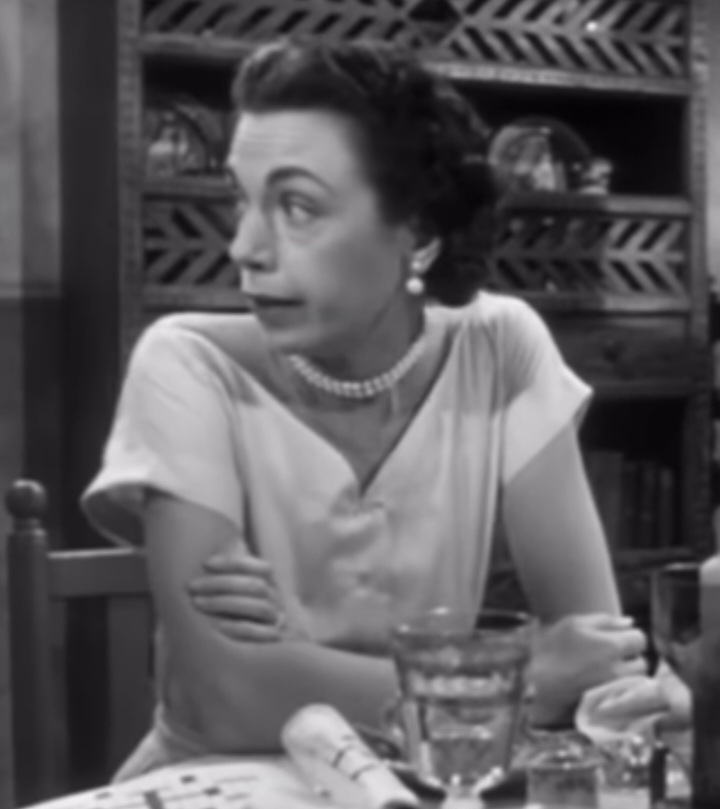
Kleeb in Kansas City Confidential (1952)

Kleeb began acting on stage in Portland, Oregon, late in the 1920s, where she attended the Ellison-White Conservatory of Music. She also gained her first radio experience in Portland. In the late 1920s and early 1930s she acted with the Duffy Players. She joined the Alcazar stock theater company in 1935. By then she had a reputation for specializing in roles of "mothers, crochety aunts, and assorted elderly females" even though she was in her mid-20s.

From 1949 to 1951, she performed voices for the radio program Candy Matson. In 1956–1957, Kleeb guest-starred on Hey, Jeannie!, starring Jeannie Carson. In the 1960–1961 television season, Kleeb appeared as Miss Claridge, a legal secretary, on the sitcom Harrigan and Son.

She appeared in episodes of Dennis the Menace, I Love Lucy, Pete and Gladys, Hennesey, Death Valley Days, The Virginian (Season 7, Episode 13, The Big Tiny), Get Smart, The Andy Griffith Show, Green Acres, Bewitched, Gunsmoke (as "Mrs. Randolph" in S1E38's "Unknown Grave" - 1956), Little House: A New Beginning, Highway to Heaven, Room 222, and The Golden Girls as well as in small film roles in The Manchurian Candidate, and Hush, Hush, Sweet Charlotte. She also appeared in a number of episodes of The Waltons, as well as Dragnet, starring Jack Webb, during the 1950s. Kleeb also appeared on many radio drama shows, some now playing on XM Satellite Radio.

== Personal life ==
Kleeb's first marriage and the birth of a son, Tom Pendergast, caused a hiatus in her career. After her first husband's death in 1950, she taught drama at a college before she returned to acting. She is buried in Holy Cross Cemetery, Culver City.

== Filmography ==
Year	Title	Role	Notes
1952	Kansas City Confidential	Mrs. Crane	Uncredited
1953	99 River Street	Miss Henderson	Uncredited
1953	Half a Hero	Desk Nurse	Uncredited
1954	Witness to Murder	Nurse in Mental Ward	Uncredited
1954	Magnificent Obsession	Mrs. Eden	
1955	There's Always Tomorrow	Miss Walker	
1955	The Desperate Hours	Miss Wells	Uncredited
1956	A Day of Fury	Mrs. McLean	
1956	Friendly Persuasion	Old Lady	Uncredited
1957	Hot Summer Night	Scrub Woman	Uncredited
1957	The Invisible Boy	Miss Vandergrift	Uncredited
1958	High School Confidential	Miss Dodge	Uncredited
1958	Summer Love	Bit Role	Uncredited
1958	I Want to Live!	Prison Matron	Uncredited
1959	Curse of the Undead	Dora	
1959	The Gazebo	Miss Spence	Uncredited
1960	Cage of Evil	Mrs. Melton, Cherry's Motel	
1961	The Young Savages	Mrs. Patton	Uncredited
1961	Ada	Mrs. Smith	Uncredited
1962	The Manchurian Candidate	Mrs. Henry Whittaker - Chairlady	Uncredited
1962	40 Pounds of Trouble	Child Welfare Worker	Uncredited
1963	Toys in the Attic	Warkins' Secretary	Uncredited
1964	Seven Days in May	Esther Townsend	
1964	Hush… Hush, Sweet Charlotte	Town Gossip	
1964	Sex and the Single Girl	Hilda	
1965	The Hallelujah Trail	Henrietta	
1965	Get Smart	Frieda	Season 1, episode 4: "Our Man in Toyland"
1966	Munster, Go Home!	Emily	Uncredited
1966	The Fortune Cookie	The Lawyers' Receptionist	
1966	Bewitched	Sarah Albright	Season 3, episode 11: "Oedipux Hex"
1967	Eight on the Lam	Bit Role	Uncredited
1967	Fitzwilly	Mrs. Mortimer	
1968	The Party	Secretary	
1968	Blue	Elizabeth Parker	
1968	The Virginian (TV series)	Mrs. Mauder	Season 7, episode 13: "Big Tiny"
1969-1971	Room 222	Mrs. Tandy	recurring character
1970	Halls of Anger	Rita Monahann	
1971	Star Spangled Girl	YWCA Receptionist	
1972-1981	The Waltons	Mamie Baldwin	recurring character
1982	The Best Little Whorehouse in Texas	Dora	
1985	Who's the Boss?	Mrs. Randolf	Season 1, episode 16: "Angela’s Ex part 2"
1988	The Golden Girls	Elizabeth Ann Hollingsworth	Season 3, episode 25: "Mother's Day"
1997	A Walton Easter	Miss Mamie Baldwin	TV movie
