= Natalie Masters =

American actress (1915–1986)

- Natalie Masters in The Twilight Zone 1963
- Born: Natalie Parks; November 23, 1915
- Died: February 9, 1986 (aged 70)

Natalie Masters (born Natalie Parks; November 23, 1915 – February 9, 1986) was an American actress. She was featured in several television shows, including The Real McCoys, Adam-12, Dragnet, The Patty Duke Show, My Three Sons, and Gunsmoke. She played Wilma Clemson on the television series Date with the Angels, and played the title role in the radio series Candy Matson. She was married to actor Monty Masters, who also created Candy Matson.

== Filmography ==
Year	Title	Role	Notes
1955	Trial	Rally Chairman	Uncredited
1956	Santiago	Governess	Uncredited
1956	Bigger Than Life	Mrs. Tyndal	Uncredited
1956	The Bad Seed	Nurse	Uncredited
1956	The Best Things in Life Are Free	Minor Role	Uncredited
1957	The Night Runner	Miss Lowell	
1957	The Vampire	Ruth	Uncredited
1957	Man of a Thousand Faces	Nurse	(deleted scenes)
1962	House of Women	Matron	Uncredited
1962	The Music Man	Farmer's Wife	Uncredited
1964	The Best Man	Mrs. Anderson	
1966	A Big Hand for the Little Lady	Mrs. Stribling	Uncredited
1968	Rosemary's Baby	Young Woman	Uncredited
1987	Beyond the Next Mountain	Mrs. Bartlett	(final film role)
