= Paul O'Keefe =

American actor (born 1951)

- Born: April 27, 1951 (age 74); Everett, Massachusetts, U.S.

Paul O'Keefe (born April 27, 1951) is an American actor best known for his work as Ross Lane, the younger brother of Patty Duke's character Patty Lane in the television series The Patty Duke Show and for the movie The Daydreamer. Born in Boston, Massachusetts, he began his schooling at the Immaculate Conception School and at the New England Conservatory of Music. He appeared on television with such actors as Sid Caesar, Sarah Vaughan, and Bob Hope. At the age of 7 years, he played Winthrop Paroo in the 1959 musical The Music Man on Broadway. Prior to his engagement for The Music Man, he played Little Jake to Dolores Gray's Annie Get Your Gun at the Carousel Theatre in Framingham, Massachusetts.

Since the deaths of Jean Byron in 2006 and Patty Duke, William Schallert and Eddie Applegate in 2016, O'Keefe is now the only surviving member of The Patty Duke Show's main cast. O'Keefe played guitar and keyboards in the orchestra for the original run of the Broadway musical Rent (musical) and served as the assistant musical director and assistant conductor for the 20th anniversary tour of the show.

== Filmography ==
Acting career of Paul O'Keefe
Year	Title	Role
1999	The Patty Duke Show: Still Rockin' in Brooklyn Heights	Ross Lane
1999	Celebrity Profile	Himself
1979	Hot Hero Sandwich	10 episodes
1972	Child's Play	Banks
1967	My Three Sons	Norman
1966	The Daydreamer	Chris
1963	Best of Patty Duke	Ross Lane
1963–1966	The Patty Duke Show	Ross Lane
1963	Cowboy and the Tiger	Henry
1963	Naked City	Jack Johannis
1962–1963	Car 54, Where Are You?	3 episodes
1962 - 1963; 1967 - 1968	As the World Turns	Dr. Dan 'Danny' Stewart/Tom Hughes
1959	Toast of the Town	Himself
