= The Adams Chronicles =

1976 American bicentennial television series

- Genre: Drama
- Written by: Sam Hall; Tad Mosel
- Directed by: Paul Bogart; James Cellan Jones; Bill Glenn; Fred Coe
- Starring: George Grizzard; William Daniels; David Birney; John Beal
- Narrated by: Michael Tolan
- Country of origin: United States
- Original languages: English; French; Dutch
- No. of seasons: 1
- No. of episodes: 13

Production
- Running time: 50 minutes

Original release
- Network: WNET
- Release: January 20 – April 13, 1976

The Adams Chronicles is an American historical drama miniseries produced by PBS broadcast in 1976 to commemorate the American Bicentennial.

== Synopsis ==
The series chronicles the story of the Adams political family over a 150-year span, including John Adams (drafter and signer of the Declaration, accomplished diplomat, and the 2nd President of the U.S.), his wife Abigail Adams, his son John Quincy Adams (acclaimed Secretary of State, the 6th President, and prominent abolitionist Congressman), grandson Charles Francis Adams, Congressman and Ambassador to Great Britain during the Civil War, and much-heralded members of the fourth generation Henry Brooks Adams, the historian and author of the novel Democracy, and Charles Francis Adams II, the industrialist.

The most prominent role in the series is John Adams, played by George Grizzard. His views dominate the series even after his death on July 4, 1826, the 50th anniversary of the passage of the United States Declaration of Independence. As a result of his achievements during the Revolution and afterwards as vice president and president of the U.S., subsequent Adams generations have a hard time dealing with this legacy of public service and accomplishment and frequently wonder if they are measuring up to their distinguished ancestry. In the end, the members of the fourth generation come to believe that the time during which the Adams family could play a prominent role in the affairs of the nation has passed.

== Episode list ==
Chapter I: John Adams, Lawyer

John Adams, as a young man, makes the decision to become a lawyer, which gets off to a rocky start, and he retreats back to the small town farm left him by his father, contrary to the advice of his cousin Samuel Adams. He meets Abigail Smith, a parson's daughter, whom he courts and marries. Despite the death of one daughter, his family grows and he moves to Boston becoming a respected attorney, while also becoming more involved in politics as British policy becomes increasingly repressive. After the Boston Massacre he is engaged to represent the British soldiers who fired into a protesting mob.

Chapter II: John Adams, Revolutionary

Having gotten most of the soldiers acquitted, with only two suffering minor charges for manslaughter, John Adams finds himself the subject of insults by many in Boston, so he moves Abigail and the children back to the farm and commutes for business. He regains his reputation among those advocating against the crown's further actions by a newspaper article asserting the colonists rights. After the Boston Tea Party, the British blockade the harbor until the destroyed tea is paid for, and the colonies set up the Continental Congress to provide relief to Boston and negotiate with England. Adams is sent to Philadelphia as one of the representatives of Massachusetts. Meanwhile, Abigail has to confront an outbreak of dystentry that sweeps through their home. When colonial troops fire on the British at the Battles of Lexington and Concord, heralding the beginning of the American Revolution, Adams wants to join and fight, but is persuaded that he is needed in Congress. He disappoints friend John Hancock by passing over him to appoint George Washington as commander of the army. One of his letters to Abigail complaining about other congressmen is intercepted by the British and published. Deprivations of imported goods become worse. John Adams asks Thomas Jefferson to write the Declaration of Independence.

Chapter III: John Adams, Diplomat

John Adams and Benjamin Franklin refuse British terms offered by Lord Howe, as the United States want independence and will not return to being colonies in exchange for pardons. After Silas Deane, the American commissioner in Europe, is charged with embezzlement, Adams is asked by Congress to replace him. Initially he refuses, but Abigail persuades him to accept and take their son John Quincy Adams with him. Adams finds that his provincial manners, lack of languages, and temperament bring him little diplomatic success in France, where Franklin has become a celebrity. France, despite being America's ally, wants peace negotiations with Britain to conform to France's interests. However, Adams is able to negotiate a large loan in the Netherlands from the Dutch government to the nascent United States. John Quincy Adams is dispatched to Russia as a diplomat's secretary due to his great facility for languages. Adams concludes the Treaty of Paris.

Chapter IV: John Adams, Minister to Great Britain

Chapter V: John Adams, Vice President

With Gen. Washington as President, Adams becomes Vice-President and head of the Senate. When Jefferson's Republicans and Hamilton's Federalists have strongly conflicting views over the French Revolutionary war, Adams finds himself in the middle. Adams is elected second President of the United States.

Chapter VI: John Adams, President

Increasingly exasperating relations with France lead to the XYZ Affair, then the Quasi-War.

Chapter VII: John Quincy Adams, Diplomat

In Ghent, Adams and his delegation struggle to negotiate an end to the War of 1812.

Chapter VIII: John Quincy Adams, Secretary of State

During the Seminole War, the executions of Arbuthnot and Ambrister in Spanish Florida create a diplomatic incident. The United States and Britain consider whether to make a joint statement on the wars in South America, but this evolves into the Monroe Doctrine. In the presidential election, Henry Clay is the kingmaker. Adams becomes sixth President.

Chapter IX: John Quincy Adams, President

Chapter X: John Quincy Adams, Congressman

Chapter XI: Charles Francis Adams, Minister to Great Britain

Chapter XII: Henry Adams, Historian

Chapter XIII: Charles Francis Adams II, Industrialist

== Cast ==
Adams family

- George Grizzard as John Adams (Chapters I–VI, VIII–IX)
- Kathryn Walker as Abigail Adams (Chapters I–IV)
- Leora Dana as Abigail Adams (ages 44–74) (Chapters V–VI, VIII)
- Addison Powell as Reverend William Smith (father of Abigail Adams) (Chapter I)
- Nancy Marchand as Elizabeth Smith (mother of Abigail Adams) (Chapters I–II)
- J.C. Powell as Charles Adams (boy) (Chapters II–III)
- Philip Anglim as Charles Adams (Chapter V)
- Tom Tammi as Thomas Adams (Chapters V–VI)
- Marcel Trenchard as John Quincy Adams (boy) (Chapter II)
- Steve Austin as John Quincy Adams (youth) (Chapter II)
- Steven Grover as John Quincy Adams (youth) (Chapter III)
- Mark Winkworth as John Quincy Adams (Chapters IV–V)
- David Birney as John Quincy Adams (Chapter VII only)
- William Daniels as John Quincy Adams (Chapters VIII–X)
- Pamela Payton-Wright as Louisa Catherine Adams (Chapter VII)
- Katherine Houghton as Abigail Adams II (Chapters IV, VI)
- Richard Cox as Colonel William Stephens Smith (husband of Abigail Adams II) (Chapter IV)
- Maureen Anderman as Mary Catherine Hellen (wife of John Adams) (Chapters VIII–X)
- Steven Krey as Charles Francis Adams (boy) (Chapter VII)
- Thomas A. Stewart as Charles Francis Adams (Chapters VIII–X)
- John Beal as Charles Francis Adams (Chapters XI–XIII)
- Nancy Coleman as Abigail Brown Brooks Adams (wife of Charles Francis Adams) (Chapters XI–XIII)
- Peter Brandon as Henry Adams (Chapters XII–XIII)
- Charles Siebert as Charles Francis Adams II (Chapters XII–XIII)
- Nicholas Pryor as John Quincy Adams II (Chapters XII–XIII)
- Patricia Elliott as Minnie Adams (Chapters XII–XIII)

U.S. politicians

- W. B. Brydon as Samuel Adams (cousin of John Adams) (Chapters I–II)
- Curt Dawson as John Hancock (Chapters I–II)
- William Shust as Patrick Henry (Chapter II)
- John Wylie as John Dickinson (Chapter II)
- Robert Symonds as Benjamin Franklin (Chapters II–III)
- Albert Stratton as Thomas Jefferson (Chapters II, IV–VI)
- James Congdon as James Lovell (Chapter III)
- James Tripp as Francis Dana (Chapter III)
- David Hooks as George Washington (Chapter V)
- Jeremiah Sullivan as Alexander Hamilton (Chapters V–VI)
- Michael Egan as General Knox (Chapter V)
- Karl Light as Senator Izard (Chapter V)
- Ken Kercheval as James Madison (Chapters V, VII)
- Henry Butler as James Monroe (Chapters V, VII–VIII)
- Frederic Warringer as Samuel Otis (Chapter V)
- Tom Aldredge as James McHenry (Chapters V–VI)
- Reid Shelton as Timothy Pickering (Chapter VI)
- David O'Brien as Oliver Wolcott (Chapter VI)
- Josef Sommer as Charles Lee (Chapter VI)
- John Braden as John Marshall (Chapter VI)
- John McQuade as General Pinckney (Chapter VI)
- Tom McDermott as Eldridge Gerry (Chapter VI)
- Robert Prosky as Benjamin Stoddert (Chapter VI)
- Stephen Strimpell as Ames (Chapter VI)
- George Hearn as Henry Clay (Chapters VII–X)
- Michael Wager as Albert Gallatin (Chapter VII)
- Robert Moberly as Senator Bayard (Chapter VII)
- Wesley Addy as General Andrew Jackson (Chapters VIII–IX)
- Robert Phalen as John C. Calhoun (Chapter VIII–IX)
- Roger Alan Brown as Pinckney (Chapter X)
- Stephen D. Newman as Abraham Lincoln (Chapter XI)
- Alexander Clark as William Seward (Chapter XI)

British dignitaries, politicians, others

- John Tillinger as King George III (Chapters I–IV)
- James Noble as Jonathan Sewall (Chapter I)
- Patrick Horgan as Lord Howe (Chapter III)
- Ed Zang as English Tailor (Chapter IV)
- Don McHenry as Sir Clement Cotterell Dormer (Chapter IV)
- Jack Gwillim as Lord Carmarthen (Chapter IV)
- Robert Gerringer as Burrill (Chapter IV)
- Thomas Barbour as Bishop of St. Asaph (Chapter IV)
- William Roerick as Lord Gambier (Chapter VII)
- George Pentecost as Henry Goulburn (Chapter VII)
- Emery Battis as Lord John Russell (Chapter XI)

Foreign dignitaries, politicians, others

- M'el Dowd as Madame Brillon (Chapter III)
- Guy Sorel as Comte de Vergennes (Chapter III)
- Taina Elg as Comtesse de Vergennes (Chapter III)
- C. K. Alexander as The Dutch Banker (Chapter III)
- Cavada Humphrey as Princess of Orange (Chapter III)
- Lance Davis as Louis XVI (Chapter III)
- Louis Turenne as M. Hauteval (Chapter VI)
- Christopher Lloyd as Tsar Alexandre I [sic] (Chapter VII)
- Paul Sparer as Chancellor Rumyantsev (Chapter VII)
- Michael Kane as General Caulaincourt (Chapter VII)
- Valerie French as Countess Rostov (Chapter VII)
- Osvaldo Riofrancos as Don Luis de Onis (Chapter VIII)
- Jean-Pierre Stewart as Alexis de Tocqueville (Chapter X)
- Norman Bush as Cinque (Chapter X)

Other Americans

- John Houseman as Justice Gridley (Chapter I)
- Reno Roop as Josiah Quincy (cousin of John Adams) (Chapter II)
- Alfred Hinckley as Captain Hay (Chapter IV)
- Robin Pearson Rose as Polly Jefferson (Chapter V)
- Donald C. Moore as Sparhawk (Chapter IV)
- Edwin Owens as Russell Jarvis (Chapter IX)
- Jerome Dempsey as Lewis Tappan (Chapter X)
- Tom Hulce as Student (Chapter X)
- Bernie McInerney as Roger Sherman Baldwin (Chapter X)
- Ronald Dawson as Chief Justice Taney (Chapter X)
- John Ramsey as Henry James (Chapter XII)
- Paul Hecht as Jay Gould (Chapter XIII)
- James Broderick as W.H. Holcomb (Chapter XIII)
- Barton Heyman as Captain Beckford (Chapter VII)
- John Horn as Lieutenant Mountgarret (Chapter VII)
- Susan Bjurman

== Soundtrack ==
- "The Liberty Song" (Chapter II)
- "Believe Me, if All Those Endearing Young Charms" (Chapter VIII)

== Awards received ==
The Adams Chronicles won a number of Emmy Awards for television excellence. These included:

Outstanding Achievement in Costume Design for a Drama or Comedy Series – 1977

The Adams Chronicles – PBS – Alvin Colt, Costume Designer

Outstanding Achievement in Lighting Direction – 1977

The Adams Chronicles – PBS – William C. Knight, Lighting Director; George Riesenberger, Lighting Director

Outstanding Achievement in Tape Sound Mixing – 1977

The Adams Chronicles – PBS – Emil Neroda, Sound Mixer

Outstanding Art Direction or Scenic Design for a Drama Series – 1977

The Adams Chronicles – PBS – Ed Wittstein, Production Designer

Outstanding Directing in a Drama Series – 1977

The Adams Chronicles – PBS – Fred Coe, Director

Outstanding Limited Series – 1977

The Adams Chronicles – PBS – James Cellan-Jones, Producer; Fred Coe, Producer; Robert Costello, Coordinating Producer; Virginia Kassel, Series Producer; Jac Venza, Executive Producer

Outstanding Writing in a Drama Series – 1977

The Adams Chronicles – PBS – Tad Mosel, Writer The Adams Chronicles – PBS – Roger O. Hirson, Writer

Outstanding Achievement in Art Direction or Scenic Design – 1976

The Adams Chronicles – PBS – Ed Wittstein, Art Director

Outstanding Achievement in Costume Design for a Drama Series – 1976

The Adams Chronicles – PBS – Alvin Colt, Costume Designer

Outstanding Achievement in Graphic Design and Title – 1976

The Adams Chronicles – PBS – Girish Bhargava, Graphic Design; Bill Mandel, Graphic Design

Outstanding Achievement in Lighting Direction – 1976

The Adams Chronicles – PBS – Billy Knight, Lighting Director; Dick Weiss, Lighting Director

Outstanding Achievement in Technical Direction – 1976

The Adams Chronicles – PBS – Leonard Chumbley, Technical Director; Walter Edel, Cameraman; John Feher, Cameraman; Steve Zink, Cameraman

Outstanding Achievement in Video Tape Editing for a Series – 1976

The Adams Chronicles – PBS – Girish Bhargava, Editor; Manford Schorn, Editor

Outstanding Lead Actor in a Limited Series – 1976

The Adams Chronicles – PBS – George Grizzard

Outstanding Lead Actress for a Single Performance – 1976

The Adams Chronicles – PBS – Kathryn Walker The Adams Chronicles – PBS – Pamela Payton-Wright

Outstanding Limited Series – 1976

The Adams Chronicles – PBS – Paul Bogart, Producer; Fred Coe, Producer; Robert Costello, Producer; James Cellan Jones, Producer; Virginia Kassel, Series Producer; Jac Venza, Executive Producer

Outstanding Writing in a Drama Series – 1976

The Adams Chronicles – PBS – Sherman Yellen, Writer

== Pronunciation note ==
The series uses the historically correct pronunciation /ˈkwɪnzi/ for Quincy, rather than the more common /ˈkwɪnsi/. (See relevant discussion here.)

== DVD release ==
The Adams Chronicles series was released on DVD by Acorn Media on May 13, 2008.

== See also ==
- List of films about the American Revolution
- List of television series and miniseries about the American Revolution
