= Patty Duke =

American actress (1946–2016)

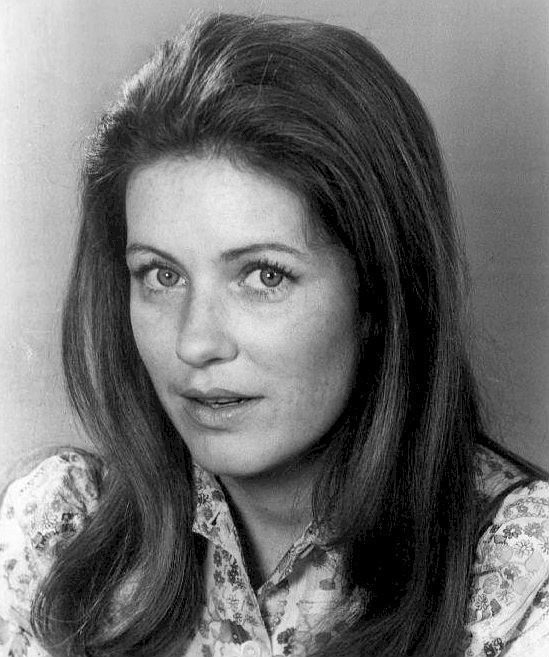
- Duke in 1975
- Born: Anna Marie Duke; December 14, 1946; New York City, U.S.
- Died: March 29, 2016 (aged 69); Coeur d'Alene, Idaho, U.S.
- Burial place: Forest Cemetery, Coeur d'Alene, Idaho
- Other names: Patty Duke Astin; Anna Duke-Pearce
- Occupation: Actress
- Years active: 1950–2015
- Spouses: Harry Falk (m. 1965; div. 1969); Michael Tell (m. 1970; ann. 1970); John Astin (m. 1972; div. 1985); Michael Pearce (m. 1986)
- Children: 3, including Sean and Mackenzie Astin

President of the Screen Actors Guild
- In office 1985–1988
- Preceded by: Ed Asner
- Succeeded by: Barry Gordon

Anna Marie "Patty" Duke (December 14, 1946 – March 29, 2016) was an American actress. Over the course of her acting career, Duke was the recipient of an Academy Award, two Golden Globe Awards, three Primetime Emmy Awards, and a star on the Hollywood Walk of Fame.

At age 15, Duke portrayed Helen Keller in the film The Miracle Worker (1962), a role she had originated on Broadway. Duke won an Academy Award for Best Supporting Actress for her performance. The following year, she played the dual role of "identical cousins" Cathy and Patty Lane on her own network television series The Patty Duke Show (1963–1966). Duke progressed to more mature roles, such as Neely O'Hara in the film Valley of the Dolls (1967) and Natalie Miller in the film Me, Natalie (1969). The latter earned her a Golden Globe Award for Best Actress – Motion Picture Comedy or Musical. From 1985 to 1988, Duke served as president of the Screen Actors Guild.

Duke was diagnosed with bipolar disorder in 1982. Following her diagnosis, Duke devoted much of her time to advocating for and educating the public on mental health. Duke was also an occasional singer and author.

== Early life ==
Anna Marie Duke was born on December 14, 1946, at Bellevue Hospital in Manhattan, New York City to Frances Margaret (née McMahon) (1913–1993), a cashier, and John Patrick Duke (1913–1964), a handyman and cab driver, who was of Irish descent. She was the youngest of three children. Duke was raised Roman Catholic.

Duke spent her early life in the Elmhurst neighborhood of Queens, where her brother Raymond, her sister Carol, and she experienced a difficult childhood. John was an alcoholic, while Frances suffered from clinical depression and was prone to violence. When Duke was six, Frances forced John to leave the family home. When Duke was eight, her care was turned over to talent managers John and Ethel Ross who, after promoting Patty's brother, were looking for a girl to add to their stable of child actors.

The Rosses' methods of managing Duke's career were often unscrupulous and exploitative. They consistently billed Duke as being two years younger than she actually was and padded her resume with false credits. They gave Duke alcohol and prescription drugs, took unreasonably high fees from her earnings, and made sexual advances to her. Duke never saw her father and saw her mother only when she visited to do the Rosses' laundry. The Rosses also made Duke change her name. "Anna Marie is dead," they said. "You're Patty now." They hoped that Patty Duke would duplicate the success of Patty McCormack.

== Career ==
=== Acting ===
==== 1950s–1990s ====
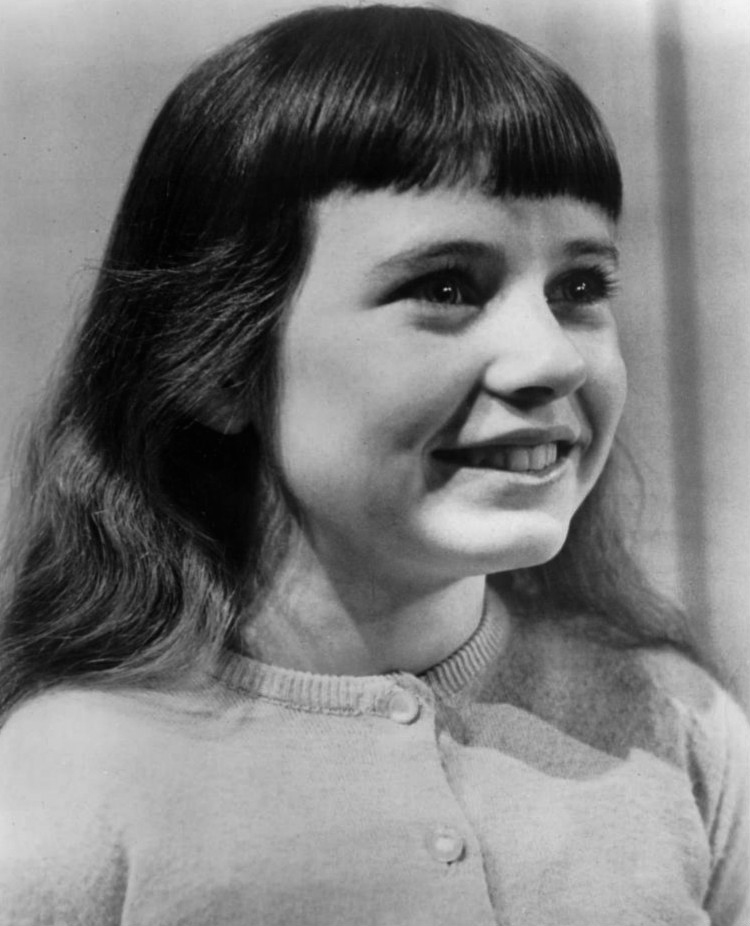
Duke in a publicity photo from December 1959

One of Duke's early acting roles was in the late 1950s on the soap opera The Brighter Day. She was featured in the uncredited role of Augusta Davis in the 1958 black and white short "An American Girl". Duke also appeared in print ads and in television commercials. In 1959, at age 12, she was a contestant on The $64,000 Question and won $32,000; Duke's category of expertise, according to her autobiography Call Me Anna, was popular music. The game show was revealed to have been rigged, and Duke was called to testify before a panel of the United States Senate. She eventually testified before congressional investigators and broke into tears when she admitted she had been coached to speak falsely.

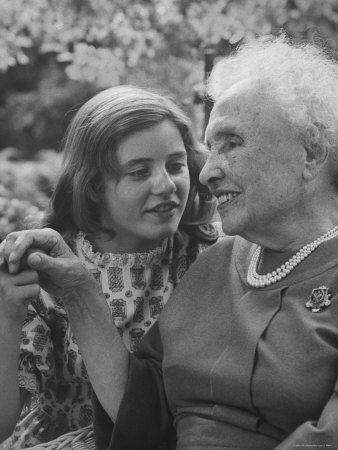
Duke with Helen Keller, whom she portrayed in both the play and film The Miracle Worker (1962)

Also in 1959, Duke appeared in a television adaptation of Meet Me in St. Louis as Tootie Smith, the role that had originated in the film version by Margaret O'Brien. Duke's first major starring role was Helen Keller (with Anne Bancroft as Anne Sullivan), in the Broadway play The Miracle Worker, which ran from October 1959 to July 1961. Duke originated the role of Keller on Broadway, although Patty McCormack actually originated the role in its earlier original presentation as a live television drama on Playhouse 90. During the run, her name was elevated above the play's title on the theater's billboard, believed to be the first time this had been done for such a young star. The play was subsequently made into a 1962 film for which Duke received the Academy Award for Best Supporting Actress. Before the film started shooting, the actress and activist Helen Keller briefly met. At age 16, Duke was the youngest person at that time to have received an Academy Award in a competitive category. Duke returned to television, this time starring with Laurence Olivier and George C. Scott in a television production of The Power and the Glory (1961).

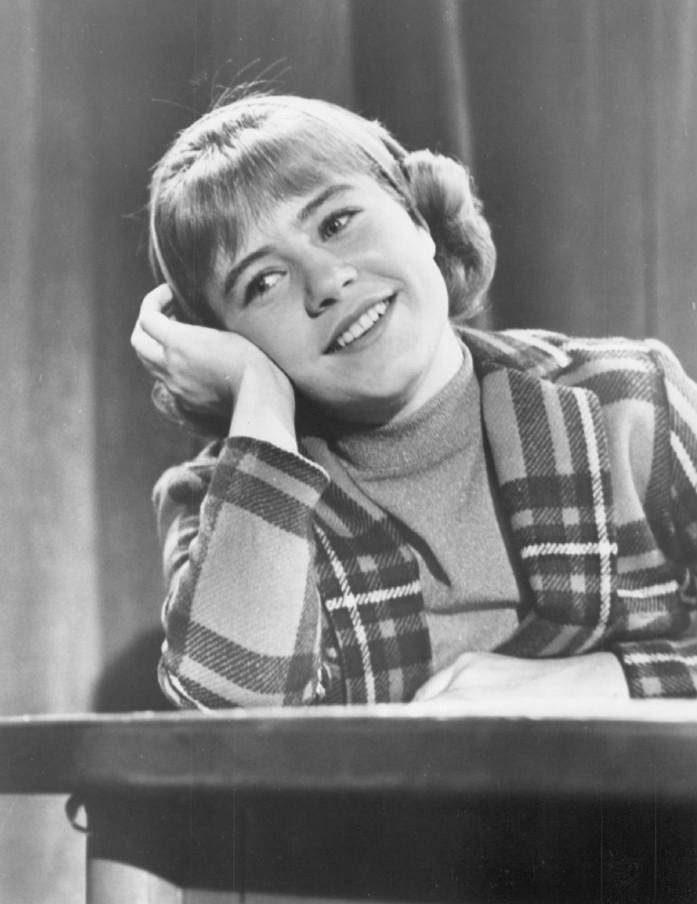
Duke as Patty Lane on The Patty Duke Show, 1965

Duke's own series, The Patty Duke Show, was created by Sidney Sheldon especially for her, in the wake of the 1961 Walt Disney hit movie The Parent Trap with Hayley Mills as identical twins. The series premiered in September 1963. At that time, Duke had not been diagnosed as having bipolar disorder, but Sheldon noticed that she had two distinct sides to her personality, so he developed the concept of identical cousins with contrasting personalities. Duke portrayed both main characters: Patricia "Patty" Lane, a fun-loving American teenager who occasionally got into trouble at school and home, and her prim and proper "identical cousin" from Scotland, Catherine "Cathy" Lane. William Schallert portrayed Patty's father, Martin, and his twin brother, Kenneth, Cathy's father; Jean Byron played her mother, Natalie; Paul O'Keefe was her younger brother, Ross; and Eddie Applegate portrayed her boyfriend, Richard Harrison (though the actor was more than a decade older than Duke). The show also featured such high-profile guest stars as Sammy Davis Jr., Peter Lawford, Paul Lynde, and Sal Mineo. It lasted three seasons and earned Duke an Emmy Award nomination. In 1999, the program's characters were revisited and updated in The Patty Duke Show: Still Rockin' in Brooklyn Heights, with Cindy Williams taking on the villain role of Sue Ellen Turner when Kitty Sullivan was unable to reprise her role.

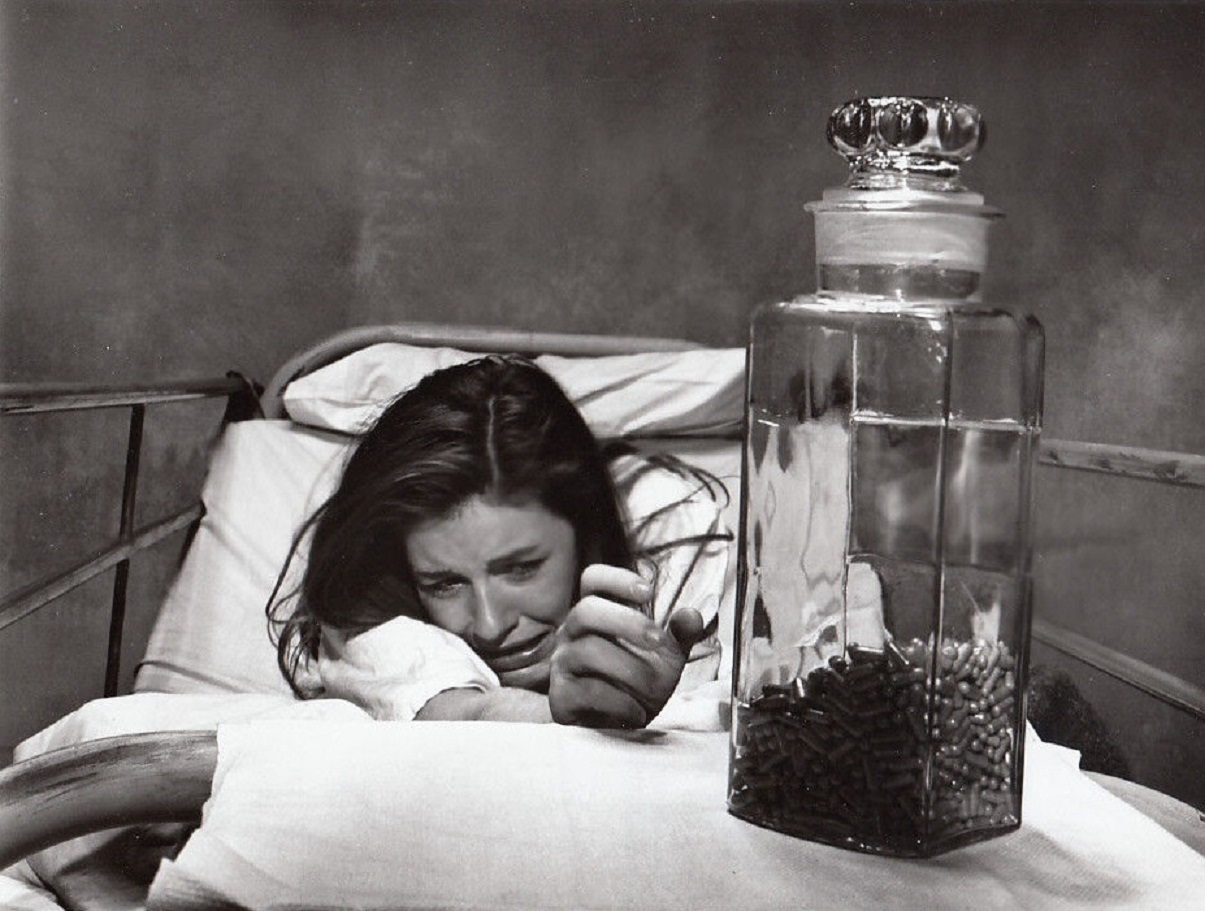
Duke as Neely O'Hara in Valley of the Dolls, 1967

After the cancellation of The Patty Duke Show in 1966, Duke began her adult acting career by playing Neely O'Hara in Valley of the Dolls (1967). The film was a box-office success, but audiences and critics had a difficult time accepting all-American teenager Duke as an alcoholic and drug-addicted singing star. While the film has since become a camp classic—thanks in large part to Duke's over-the-top performance—at the time, it almost ruined her career. In 1969, Duke starred in Me, Natalie, playing an "ugly duckling" Brooklyn teenager struggling to make a life for herself in the Bohemian world of Greenwich Village. Duke won the Golden Globe Award for Best Actress (Musical or Comedy) for the role.

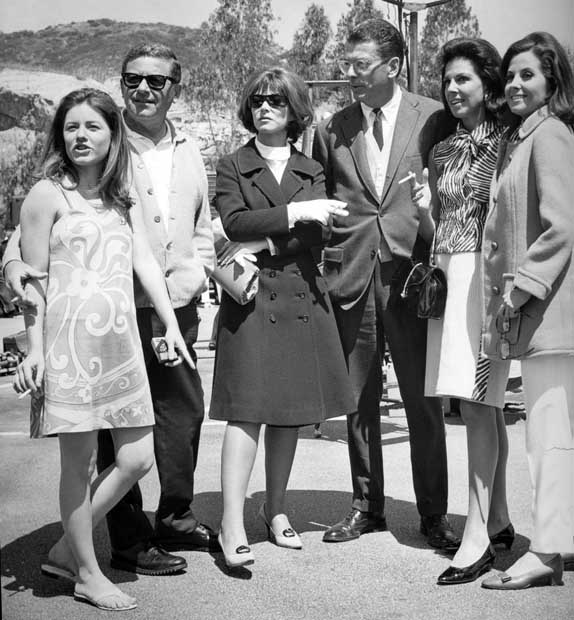
Left to right: Duke, Mark Robson, Lee Grant, David Weisbart, Jacqueline Susann, and Barbara Parkins on the set of Valley of the Dolls

Duke returned to television in 1970, starring in a made-for-TV movie, My Sweet Charlie. Her portrayal of a pregnant teenager on the run won Duke her first Emmy Award. Her acceptance speech was rambling and disjointed, leading many in the industry to believe that Duke was drunk or using drugs at the time. In fact, Duke was experiencing a manic phase of her bipolar disorder, which remained undiagnosed until 1982. Duke received her second Emmy in 1977 for the TV miniseries Captains and the Kings and her third in 1980 for a TV version of her 1979 stage revival of The Miracle Worker, this time playing Anne Sullivan to Melissa Gilbert's Helen Keller. Her turns in the made-for-TV movies The Women's Room (1980) and George Washington (1984) both garnered her Emmy nominations. In the 1980s, Duke was cast in a number of short-lived TV series. The ABC sitcom It Takes Two, from Soap and Benson creator Susan Harris, was cancelled after one season; Hail to the Chief, in which she appeared as the first female President of the United States; and a comedy, Karen's Song, which aired on the fledgling Fox network. Duke was also a co-host of AM Los Angeles on KABC-TV alongside Steve Edwards in 1987.

Duke's film roles in the 1980s included the Canadian film By Design (1981), which garnered her a Genie Award nomination for Best Foreign Actress, and the made-for-TV movie A Time to Triumph (1986), the true story of Concetta Hassan, a woman who struggles to support her family after her husband is injured, but who eventually becomes a United States Army helicopter pilot. In 1990, Duke's autobiography, Call Me Anna, was adapted for television; she played herself from her mid-30s onward. In 1992, Duke portrayed the mother of Meg Ryan's character in the film adaptation of the play Prelude to a Kiss. Seven years later, Duke received an Emmy nomination for her appearances in three episodes of Touched by an Angel.

In 1985, Duke became the second woman, after Kathleen Nolan, to be elected president of the Screen Actors Guild, a post she held until 1988. Duke's tenure as president was marked by factional in-fighting and controversy, but she gained respect for managing to maintain solidarity among the guild's members. During her term, Duke led industrial actions and contract negotiations and oversaw the relocation of the guild's headquarters.

==== Later years ====
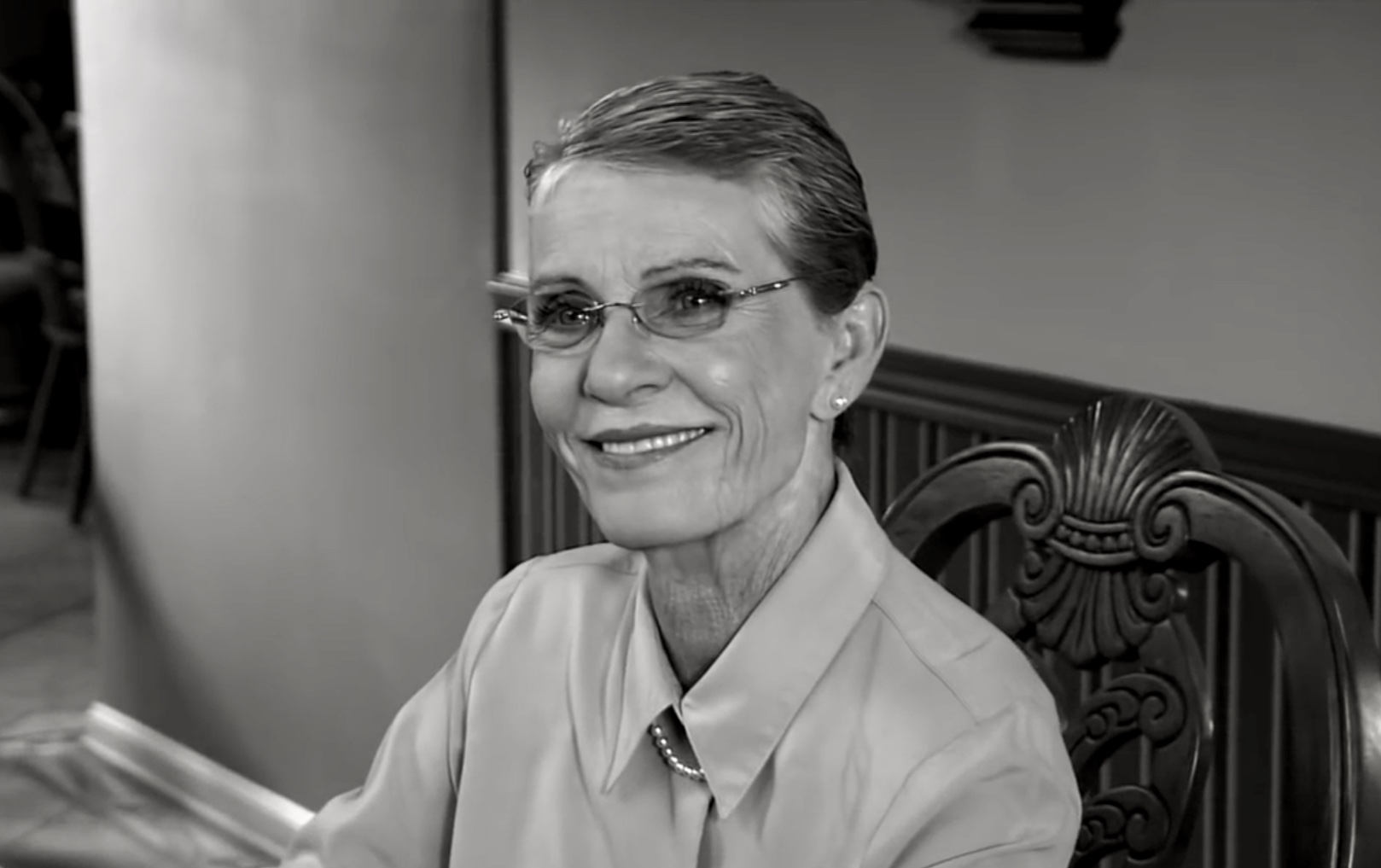
Duke reprising her role as Cathy Lane in a series of U.S. government Social Security promotions for filing for Social Security online, 2011

Duke gradually reduced her work schedule in the 2000s, but took occasional TV roles, including guest appearances on shows such as Glee and the reboot of Hawaii Five-0. In 2011, Duke joined the cast of the drama The Protector. She also returned to the stage on occasion—in 2002 as Aunt Eller in a revival of Oklahoma! on Broadway and in 2009 as Madame Morrible in the San Francisco production of the musical Wicked. In 2010, Duke hosted a PBS TV special When Irish Eyes Are Smiling: An Irish Parade Of Stars. The special was part of the My Music series and featured Irish and Irish-American folk music and sentimental standards. In May 2011, she directed the stage version of The Miracle Worker at the now defunct Interplayers Theater in Spokane, Washington.

In 2011, Duke appeared in public service announcements for the U.S. government, promoting the Social Security website. In several, she appeared as Patty and Cathy using split-screen effects. In others, Duke appeared with George Takei wearing a Star Trek-like costume. In 2015, she made her final TV appearance, guest-starring on Liv and Maddie as Grandma Janice and Great-aunt Hilary, a pair of identical twins.

=== Singing ===
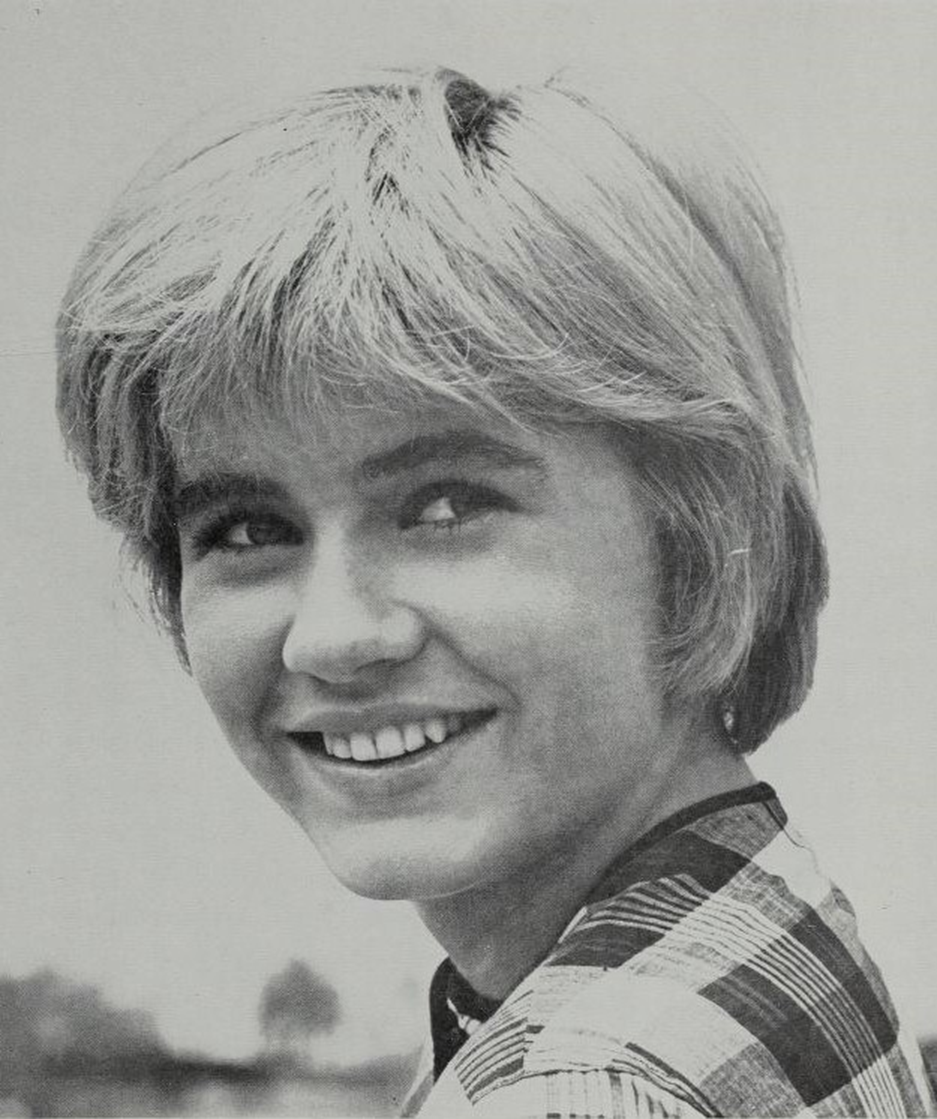
Duke on the cover of music publication Cash Box, December 11, 1965

Like many teen stars of the era, and bolstered somewhat by her appearance in the musical Billie, Duke had a successful singing career, including two top-40 hits in 1965, "Don't Just Stand There" (number eight) and "Say Something Funny" (number 22). She also performed on TV shows such as The Ed Sullivan Show.

=== Mental health advocacy ===
In 1987, Duke revealed in her autobiography that she had been diagnosed with manic depression (now called bipolar disorder) five years prior, becoming one of the first public figures to speak out about her personal experience of mental illness. She also suffered from anorexia nervosa, and during her teenage years, weighed as little as 76 pounds (34 kg). Duke attempted suicide in 1967 and was again hospitalized for mental health problems in 1969, eventually being diagnosed as manic depressive in 1982. Her treatment, which included the use of lithium as medication and therapy, successfully stabilized her moods. Duke subsequently became an activist for mental health causes. She lobbied the United States Congress and joined forces with the National Institute of Mental Health and the National Alliance on Mental Illness to increase awareness, funding, and research for people with mental illness. In 2007, Duke appeared on The Oprah Winfrey Show, talking about her bipolar disorder.

=== Memoirs ===
Duke wrote three books. Her autobiography, Call Me Anna (ISBN 0-553-27205-5) was published in 1987, and Brilliant Madness: Living with Manic Depressive Illness (ISBN 0-553-56072-7) was published in 1992. The third, In The Presence of Greatness—My Sixty Year Journey as an Actress (ISBN 9781629332352) (with William J. Jankowski), published posthumously in February 2018, is a collection of essays about her experiences with other artists and celebrities.

== Recognition ==
Over the course of her career, Duke received an Academy Award for Best Supporting Actress, three Emmy Awards in 10 nominations, and two Golden Globe Awards amongst four nominations. In 1963, when she won her Academy Award, Duke became the youngest person to ever win an Academy Award in a competitive category.

On August 17, 2004, Duke received a star on the Hollywood Walk of Fame for her contribution to the motion-picture industry. On December 14, 2007, her 61st birthday, Duke was awarded an honorary doctorate in humane letters degree from the University of North Florida for her work in advancing awareness of mental health issues. On March 6, 2010, she was awarded an honorary doctorate in humane letters degree from the University of Maryland Eastern Shore.

== Personal life ==
Duke was married four times and had three children. A Catholic, Duke had dreams of becoming a nun in her youth. In her later life, she studied a number of different religions, commenting in 1995: "To suggest that one must spout Moses or Jesus or Buddha or chant like Tibetan monks in order to be religious, I believe, is not to walk in the path of Christ... I have been a Christian Scientist. If there's a religious definition of 'dabbler', I guess that would be me. I have studied Buddhism. There was a time when I very seriously considered Judaism. And, yes, I do go to church now. I go to a Unity Church. I also go to Catholic church occasionally because the child in me desperately needs the bells and smells."

In 1965, at age 18, Duke married director Harry Falk, who was 13 years her senior. It led to the end of Duke's relationship with her childhood guardians, the Rosses. During their marriage, Duke had repeated mood swings, drank heavily, became anorexic, and overdosed on pills a number of times. The couple divorced in 1969.

In early 1970, at age 23, Duke became involved with three men at the same time: 17-year-old Here's Lucy star Desi Arnaz Jr., actor John Astin (who was 16 years her senior), and rock music promoter Michael Tell. The relationship with Arnaz was widely publicized, due in part to the vocal and public opposition of Arnaz's mother, actress and production company executive Lucille Ball. By late spring, Duke and Arnaz had broken off their relationship.

In June 1970, Duke learned that she was pregnant. Duke then married Michael Tell on June 26, 1970, to "give (her child) a name." Their marriage lasted 13 days before ending in an annulment on July 9, 1970. Her son, actor Sean Astin, was born on February 25, 1971; she later told him that Arnaz was his biological father. Duke wrote in her 1987 autobiography that the marriage to Tell was never consummated, and that Astin was Sean's biological father, emphasizing those two assertions in several parts of the book. Both of her statements on these matters appear to have been incorrect: in 1994, biological tests determined that Tell was Sean's biological father.

Duke married John Astin on August 5, 1972. Astin adopted Sean, and the couple had a son together, actor Mackenzie Astin. Duke and Astin worked together extensively during their marriage, and she took his name professionally, becoming "Patty Duke Astin". During this period, Duke underwent a hysterectomy. Duke also adopted Astin's other three sons; years later in 1998, they reversed the adoption with Duke's approval. The couple divorced in 1985.

Duke married her fourth husband, drill sergeant Michael Pearce, in 1986, and remained married to him until her death thirty years later. Duke and Pearce had met during the production of A Time to Triumph, for which Pearce served as a consultant. Pearce had two daughters, Raelene and Charlene, to whom Duke became an enthusiastic stepmother. The couple moved to Hayden, Idaho, and adopted a son, Kevin, who was born in 1988. From her marriage to Pearce until her death in 2016, Duke occasionally used the name "Anna Duke-Pearce" in her writings and other professional work. In 2002, Duke was hospitalized with a skull fracture after a horse accident in their barn.

Duke had three granddaughters by her eldest son Sean: actresses Alexandra, Elizabeth, and Isabella.

== Death ==
Duke died on the morning of March 29, 2016, in Coeur d'Alene, Idaho, of sepsis from a ruptured intestine at age 69. Her son Sean Astin invited the public to contribute to a mental-health foundation in his mother's name, the Patty Duke Mental Health Initiative. Duke was cremated and her ashes were interred at Forest Cemetery in Coeur d'Alene.

== Filmography ==
=== Films ===
| Year | Film | Role | Notes |
|---|---|---|---|
| 1958 | Country Music Holiday | 'Sis' Brand | |
| 1958 | The Goddess | Emily Ann Faulkner (age 8) | |
| 1959 | 4D Man | Marjorie Sutherland | |
| 1959 | Happy Anniversary | Debbie Walters | |
| 1962 | The Miracle Worker | Helen Keller | |
| 1965 | Billie | Billie Carol | |
| 1966 | The Daydreamer | Thumbelina (voice) | |
| 1967 | Valley of the Dolls | Neely O'Hara | |
| 1969 | Me, Natalie | Natalie Miller | |
| 1972 | You'll Like My Mother | Francesca Kinsolving | |
| 1978 | The Swarm | Rita Bard | |
| 1982 | By Design | Helen | |
| 1985 | Gifts of Greatness | Amy Lowell | Video |
| 1986 | Willy/Milly | Doris Niceman | |
| 1992 | Prelude to a Kiss | Mrs. Boyle | |
| 1999 | Kimberly | Dr. Feinstenberger | |
| 2005 | Bigger Than the Sky | Mrs. Keene / Earlene | |
| 2008 | The Four Children of Tander Welch | Susan Metler | |
| 2012 | Amazing Love | Helen | |
| 2018 | Power of the Air | Charlene Summers | Last film role |

=== Television ===
| Year | Film | Role | Notes |
|---|---|---|---|
| 1956 | Armstrong Circle Theatre | Marianne Doona / Angelina Rico | "SOS from the Andrea Doria", "Flare-Up" |
| 1957 | Armstrong Circle Theatre | Gina | "Have Jacket, Will Travel" |
| 1958 | DuPont Show of the Month | Young Cathy | "Wuthering Heights" |
| 1958 | Kraft Television Theatre | Betty / Roberta | "A Boy Called Ciske", "Death Wears Many Faces" |
| 1958 | Kitty Foyle | Molly Scharf (young) | TV series |
| 1958 | Swiss Family Robinson | Lynda | TV film |
| 1958 | The United States Steel Hour | Kathy | "One Red Rose for Christmas" |
| 1958–59 | The Brighter Day | Ellen Williams Dennis | TV series |
| 1959 | The United States Steel Hour | Sonya Alexandrovna / Robin Kent | "Family Happiness", "Seed of Guilt" |
| 1959 | Meet Me in St. Louis | 'Tootie' Smith | TV film |
| 1959 | Once Upon a Christmas Time | Lori | TV film |
| 1961 | The Power and the Glory | Coral | TV film |
| 1962 | Ben Casey | Janie Wahl | "Mrs. McBroom and the Cloud Watcher" |
| 1962 | The United States Steel Hour | Penelope | "The Duchess and the Smugs" |
| 1963 | Wide Country | Cindy Hopkins | "To Cindy, with Love" |
| 1963 | Best of Patty Duke | Patty Lane / Cathy Lane | TV film |
| 1963–66 | The Patty Duke Show | Patty Lane / Cathy Lane | Lead role |
| 1967 | The Virginian | Sue Ann McRae | "Sue Ann" |
| 1969 | Journey to the Unknown | Barbara King | "The Last Visitor" |
| 1970 | My Sweet Charlie | Marlene Chambers | TV film |
| 1970 | Matt Lincoln | Sheila | "Sheila" |
| 1970 | The Cliff | Sheila | TV film |
| 1971 | Two on a Bench | Macy Kramer | TV film |
| 1971 | Night Gallery | Holly Schaeffer | "The Diary" |
| 1971 | If Tomorrow Comes | Eileen Phillips | TV film |
| 1972 | She Waits | Laura Wilson | TV film |
| 1972 | Deadly Harvest | Jenny | TV film |
| 1972 | The Sixth Sense | Elizabeth | "With Affection, Jack the Ripper" |
| 1972 | Owen Marshall, Counselor at Law | Lois | "Love Child" |
| 1973 | Hawaii Five-O | Toni | "Thanks for the Honeymoon" |
| 1973 | Ghost Story | Linda Colby | "Graveyard Shift" |
| 1974 | Nightmare | Jan Richards | TV film |
| 1974 | ABC's Wide World of Entertainment | Adelaide | "Hard Day at Blue Nose" |
| 1974 | The ABC Afternoon Playbreak | Melanie Kline | "Miss Kline, We Love You" |
| 1974 | Insight | Margie | "The One-Armed Man" |
| 1975 | Police Story | Daniele | "Sniper" |
| 1975 | Police Woman | Larue Collins | "Nothing Left to Lose" |
| 1975 | Marcus Welby, M.D. | Kate Gannard | "Unindicted Wife" |
| 1976 | Phillip and Barbara | Barbara Logan | TV film |
| 1976 | The Streets of San Francisco | Susan Rosen | "The Thrill Killers: Parts 1 & 2" |
| 1976 | Look What's Happened to Rosemary's Baby | Rosemary Woodhouse | TV film |
| 1976 | Captains and the Kings | Bernadette Hennessey Armagh | TV miniseries |
| 1976 | Insight | Annie Grogan | "For the Love of Annie" |
| 1977 | Insight | Loretta Berg | "A Slight Drinking Problem" |
| 1977 | Fire! | Dr. Peggy Wilson | TV film |
| 1977 | Rosetti and Ryan | Sylvia Crawford | "Men Who Love Women" |
| 1977 | Curse of the Black Widow | Laura Lockwood / Valerie Steffan | TV film |
| 1977 | Killer on Board | Norma Walsh | TV film |
| 1977 | The Storyteller | Sue Davidoff | TV film |
| 1978 | A Family Upside Down | Wendy | TV film |
| 1978 | The Love Boat | Lilly Mackim | "Memories of You/Computerman/Parlez Vous?" |
| 1978 | Insight | Nelli Grubb | "Second Chorus" |
| 1979 | Women in White | Cathy Payson | TV film |
| 1979 | Hanging by a Thread | Sue Grainger | TV film |
| 1979 | Before and After | Carole Matthews | TV film |
| 1979 | The Miracle Worker | Anne Sullivan | TV film |
| 1980 | The Women's Room | Lily | TV film |
| 1980 | Mom, the Wolfman and Me | Deborah Bergman | TV film |
| 1980 | The Babysitter | Liz Benedict | TV film |
| 1981 | Insight | Mother Alicia | "God's Guerillas" |
| 1981 | The Girl on the Edge of Town | Martha | TV film |
| 1981 | The Violation of Sarah McDavid | Sarah McDavid | TV film |
| 1981 | Please Don't Hit Me, Mom | Barbara Reynolds | TV film |
| 1982 | Something So Right | Jeanne Bosnick | TV film |
| 1982–83 | It Takes Two | Molly Quinn | Main role |
| 1983 | September Gun | Sister Dulcina | TV film |
| 1983 | Insight | Peters | "The Hit Man" |
| 1984 | Best Kept Secrets | Laura Dietz | TV film |
| 1984 | George Washington | Martha Washington | TV miniseries |
| 1985 | Hotel | Gayla Erikson | "New Beginnings" |
| 1985 | Hail to the Chief | President Julia Mansfield | Main role |
| 1986 | A Time to Triumph | Concetta Hassan | TV film |
| 1986 | George Washington II: The Forging of a Nation | Martha Washington | TV film |
| 1987 | It's a Living | Patty Duke | "The Evictables" |
| 1987 | Fight for Life | Shirley Abrams | TV film |
| 1987 | J.J. Starbuck | Verna Mckidden | "Pilot" |
| 1987 | Karen's Song | Karen Matthews | Main role |
| 1988 | Perry Mason: The Case of the Avenging Ace | Althea Sloan | TV film |
| 1988 | Fatal Judgement | Anne Capute | TV film |
| 1989 | Amityville 4: The Evil Escapes | Nancy Evans | TV film |
| 1989 | Everybody's Baby: The Rescue of Jessica McClure | Carolyn Henry | TV film |
| 1990 | Call Me Anna | Anna Marie Duke | TV film |
| 1990 | Always Remember I Love You | Ruth Monroe | TV film |
| 1991 | Absolute Strangers | Judge Ray | TV film |
| 1991 | The Torkelsons | Catharine Jeffers | "Return to Sender" |
| 1991 | The Legend of Prince Valiant | Lady Morgana (voice) | "The Trust Betrayed", "The Awakening" |
| 1992 | Last Wish | Betty Rollin | TV film |
| 1992 | Grave Secrets: The Legacy of Hilltop Drive | Jean Williams | TV film |
| 1992 | A Killer Among Friends | Jean Monroe | TV film |
| 1993 | Family of Strangers | Beth Thompson | TV film |
| 1993 | No Child of Mine | Lucille Jenkins | TV film |
| 1993 | A Matter of Justice | Mary Brown | TV film |
| 1994 | One Woman's Courage | Grace McKenna | TV film |
| 1994 | Cries from the Heart | Terry Wilson | TV film |
| 1995 | Amazing Grace | Hannah Miller | TV series |
| 1995 | When the Vows Break | Barbara Parker | TV film |
| 1996 | Race Against Time: The Search for Sarah | Natalie Porter | TV film |
| 1996 | Harvest of Fire | Annie Beiler | TV film |
| 1996 | To Face Her Past | Beth Bradfield | TV film |
| 1997 | Frasier | Alice (voice) | "Death and the Dog" |
| 1997 | A Christmas Memory | Sook | TV film |
| 1998 | When He Didn't Come Home | Faye Dolan | TV film |
| 1998 | Touched by an Angel | Nancy Williams | "I Do" |
| 1999 | The Patty Duke Show: Still Rockin' in Brooklyn Heights | Patty Lane / Cathy Lane MacAllister | TV film |
| 1999 | A Season for Miracles | Angel | TV film |
| 2000 | Miracle on the Mountain: The Kincaid Family Story | Anne Kincaid | TV film |
| 2000 | Love Lessons | Sunny Andrews | TV film |
| 2001 | Family Law | Judge Sylvia Formenti | "Liar's Club: Part 2" |
| 2001 | First Years | Evelyn Harrison | "There's No Place Like Homo" |
| 2002 | Little John | Sylvia | TV film |
| 2003 | Touched by an Angel | Jean | "I Will Walk with You: Parts 1 & 2" |
| 2004 | Judging Amy | Valerie Bing | "Disposable" |
| 2004 | Murder Without Conviction | Mother Joseph | TV film |
| 2006 | Falling in Love with the Girl Next Door | Bridget Connolly | TV film |
| 2009 | Love Finds a Home | Mary Watson | TV film |
| 2009 | Throwing Stones | Patti Thom | TV film |
| 2010 | Unanswered Prayers | Irene | TV film |
| 2011 | The Protector | Beverly | "Wings", "Blood" |
| 2011 | Hawaii Five-0 | Sylvia Spencer | "Mea Makamae" |
| 2012 | Drop Dead Diva | Rita Curtis | "Freak Show" |
| 2013 | Glee | Jan | "All or Nothing" |
| 2015 | Liv and Maddie | Grandma Janice / Great-Aunt Hillary | "Grandma-A-Rooney" |

== Awards and nominations ==
| Year | Award | Category | Nominated work | Result | Ref. |
|---|---|---|---|---|---|
| 1962 | Academy Awards | Best Supporting Actress | The Miracle Worker | Won | |
| 1984 | Daytime Emmy Awards | Outstanding Individual Achievement in Religious Programming – Performers | Insight | Nominated | |
| 1982 | Genie Awards | Best Performance by a Foreign Actress | By Design | Nominated | |
| 1962 | Golden Globe Awards | Best Supporting Actress – Motion Picture | The Miracle Worker | Nominated | |
| 1962 | Golden Globe Awards | Most Promising Newcomer – Female | The Miracle Worker | Won | |
| 1965 | Golden Globe Awards | Best Television Star – Female | The Patty Duke Show | Nominated | |
| 1969 | Golden Globe Awards | Best Actress in a Motion Picture – Musical or Comedy | Me, Natalie | Won | |
| 1962 | Laurel Awards | Top Female Supporting Performance | The Miracle Worker | Won | |
| 1965 | Laurel Awards | Top Female Musical Performance | Billie | 5th Place | |
| 1969 | Laurel Awards | Top Female Dramatic Performance | Me, Natalie | 5th Place | |
| 2014 | Online Film & Television Association Awards | Television Hall of Fame: Actors | —N/a | Inducted | |
| 1982 | People's Choice Awards | Favorite Female Performer in a New TV Program | —N/a | Won | |
| 1964 | Primetime Emmy Awards | Outstanding Continued Performance by an Actress in a Series (Lead) | The Patty Duke Show | Nominated | |
| 1970 | Primetime Emmy Awards | Outstanding Single Performance by an Actress in a Leading Role | My Sweet Charlie | Won | |
| 1977 | Primetime Emmy Awards | Outstanding Lead Actress in a Limited Series | Captains and the Kings | Won | |
| 1978 | Primetime Emmy Awards | Outstanding Lead Actress for a Single Appearance in a Drama or Comedy Series | Having Babies III | Nominated | |
| 1978 | Primetime Emmy Awards | Outstanding Performance by a Supporting Actress in a Comedy or Drama Special | A Family Upside Down | Nominated | |
| 1980 | Primetime Emmy Awards | Outstanding Lead Actress in a Limited Series or a Special | The Miracle Worker | Won | |
| 1981 | Primetime Emmy Awards | Outstanding Supporting Actress in a Limited Series or a Special | The Women's Room | Nominated | |
| 1981 | Primetime Emmy Awards | Outstanding Individual Achievement – Children's Programming | The Girl on the Edge of Town | Nominated | |
| 1984 | Primetime Emmy Awards | Outstanding Supporting Actress in a Limited Series or a Special | George Washington | Nominated | |
| 1999 | Primetime Emmy Awards | Outstanding Guest Actress in a Drama Series | Touched by an Angel (Episode: "I Do") | Nominated | |
| 2002 | Temecula Valley International Film Festival | Lifetime Achievement Award | —N/a | Won | |
| 1960 | Theatre World Awards | —N/a | The Miracle Worker | Won | |
| 2003 | TV Land Awards | Favorite Dual Role Character | The Patty Duke Show | Nominated | |
| 2004 | TV Land Awards | Favorite Dual Role Character | The Patty Duke Show | Won | |
| 1984 | Western Heritage Awards | Fictional Television Drama | September Gun | Won | |

== Discography ==
=== Albums ===
| Title & chart | Label | Year | Notes |
|---|---|---|---|
| Don't Just Stand There (No. 90 BB, No. 70 CB) | United Artists UAL 3452 (Mono)/UAS 6452 (Stereo) | 1965 | |
| Patty | United Artists UAL 3492 / UAS 6492 | 1966 | |
| Patty Duke's Greatest Hits | United Artists UAL 3535 / UAS 6535 | 1966 | |
| TV's Teen Star | Unart M 20005 (Mono)/S 21005 (Stereo) | 1967 | |
| Patty Duke Sings Songs from Valley of The Dolls and Other Selections | United Artists UAL 3623 / UAS 6623 | 1967 | |
| Patty Duke Sings Folk Songs: Time To Move On | United Artists UAL 3650 / UAS 6650 (Unreleased ) | 1968 | Note: After years of remaining unreleased, Patty Duke Sings Folk Songs: Time to Move On was released by Real Gone Music (under Capitol records) on CD and digital download in 2013. |

=== Singles ===
| Year | Titles (A-side, B-side) | Record label | Peak chart positions | | | Album |
| Year | Titles (A-side, B-side) | Record label | US Billboard | US Cashbox | CAN RPM | Album |
|---|---|---|---|---|---|---|
| 1965 | "Don't Just Stand There b/w "Everything but Love" | United Artists 875 | 8 | 6 | 2 | Don't Just Stand There |
| 1965 | "Say Something Funny" | United Artists 915 | 22 | 31 | 34 | Don't Just Stand There |
| 1965 | b/w "Funny Little Butterflies" | United Artists 915 | 77 | 51 | 7 | Patty Duke's Greatest Hits |
| 1966 | "Whenever She Holds You" b/w "Nothing But You" | United Artists 978 | 64 | 63 | 73 | Patty |
| 1966 | "The World is Watching Us" b/w "Little Things Mean a Lot" | United Artists 50034 | – | – | – | Patty |
| 1966 | "The Wall Came Tumbling Down" b/w "What Makes You Special" | United Artists 50057 (Unreleased) | – | – | – | Non-album tracks |
| 1966 | "Why Don't They Understand" b/w "Danke Schoen" | United Artists 50073 (Unreleased) | – | – | – | Don't Just Stand There |
| 1967 | "Come Live with Me" b/w "My Own Little Place" | United Artists 50216 | – | – | – | Songs from Valley of the Dolls |
| 1968 | "And We Were Strangers" b/w "Dona Dona" | United Artists 50299 | – | – | – | Patty Duke Sings Folk Songs |

== See also ==
- List of oldest and youngest Academy Award winners and nominees
