= Rita Walter =

American actress (1951–2022)

- Publicity photo of Rita Walter
- Born: Rita McLaughlin; March 8, 1951; Brooklyn, New York, U.S.
- Died: December 25, 2022 (aged 71)
- Occupation: Actress
- Years active: 1951–1985
- Spouse: Reverend Norman Walter (m. 1976)
- Children: 3

Rita Walter (née McLaughlin; March 8, 1951 – December 25, 2022) was an American actress, best known for her role as Carol Deming on the popular soap opera As the World Turns, which she played from May 1970 to December 1981.

Originally credited by her maiden name, Rita McLaughlin, she made her acting debut in the 1960s on The Patty Duke Show, in the uncredited role of Patty Duke's double. Prior to that, she was also one of Don Herbert's child assistants in the Watch Mr. Wizard television series and was featured in a TV commercial for Phillips Milk of Magnesia in 1967.

Walter's first daytime soap role was in 1966 as the original Wendy Phillips on The Secret Storm, but it would be a short stint. Four years later, in May 1970, she joined the ATWT cast as Carol Deming (and her later married names Hughes Stallings Andropoulos Frazier) until her exit from the serial on Christmas Day 1981. She also appeared in the 1985 movie Cry From the Mountain.

Walter, who had been married to Reverend Norman Walter since 1976, was an optician working at Warby Parker in Westfield, New Jersey. She has three children, Brian, Jillian and Amy, and 8 grandchildren.

Walter died on December 25, 2022, at the age of 71.
