= A Ticklish Affair =

1963 film by George Sidney

- Directed by: George Sidney
- Screenplay by: Ruth Brooks Flippen
- Based on: "Moon Walk"; 1962 Ladies Home Journal by Barbara Luther
- Produced by: Joe Pasternak
- Starring: Shirley Jones; Gig Young; Red Buttons
- Cinematography: Milton R. Krasner
- Edited by: John McSweeney, Jr.
- Music by: Score: George Stoll; Songs: George Stoll (music); Robert Van Eps (music); Harold Adamson (lyrics)
- Color process: Metrocolor
- Production companies: Euterpe, Inc.
- Distributed by: Metro-Goldwyn-Mayer (MGM)
- Release date: August 18, 1963
- Running time: 88 minutes
- Country: United States
- Language: English

A Ticklish Affair, also known as Moon Walk, is a 1963 American comedy film directed by George Sidney and starring Shirley Jones, Gig Young, Red Buttons and Carolyn Jones. The screenplay, by Ruth Brooks Flippen, was based on a short story by Barbara Luther. The film was nominated for a Golden Globe in 1964.

== Plot ==
Commander Key Weedon, a pilot with the U.S. Navy, is sent to investigate when an S.O.S. emergency signal is spotted in the San Diego area near NAS North Island. He discovers it is the doing of a six-year-old boy, Grover Martin, whose Uncle Simon, an airline pilot, gave the boy a blinker light as a gift.

The child's mother, Amy, is an attractive widow, and Key develops an immediate interest in her. Her three sons also enjoy the attention Key gives all of them. Amy has a blind spot when it comes to naval officers, however, not wanting a permanent relationship with one because they are constantly on the move. She had been a military child herself, and missed not having permanent "roots". Sure enough, Key gets orders to go to Italy, so Amy refuses his marriage proposal, though they love each other.

Uncle Simon has a new treat for Grover and his brothers. He ties them to helium weather balloons and flies them as one would a kite. Unfortunately, Grover unties his tether and he goes floating for miles over San Diego. Large-scale rescue operations are quickly organized by the Navy, and it turns out to be Key himself who lowers himself on a rope ladder from a Navy blimp to rescue the boy. A grateful Amy then decides that wherever he goes, Key is the man for her.

== Cast ==
As appearing in A Ticklish Affair, (main roles and screen credits identified):

- Shirley Jones as Amy Martin
- Gig Young as Commander Key Weedon, USN
- Red Buttons as Uncle Simon Shelley
- Carolyn Jones as Tandy Martin
- Edgar Buchanan as Captain Martin
- Peter Robbins as Grover Martin
- Bill Mumy as Alex Martin
- Edward Platt as Captain Haven Hitchcock, USN
- Bryan Russell as Luke Martin
- Eddie Applegate as Yeoman Corker Bell
- Robert Foulk as Policeman

== Production ==
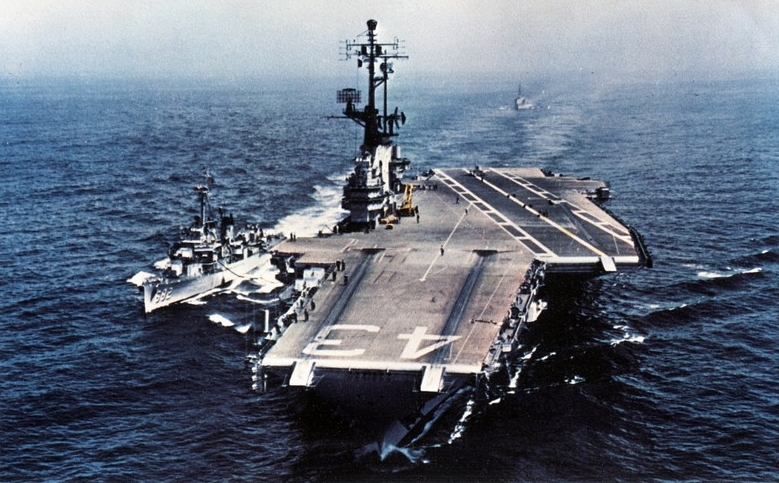
The USS Coral Sea (CVA-43) was seen prominently in A Ticklish Affair.

Originally titled Moon Walk, the production was intended to be a vehicle for Jean Simmons. Contract obligations, however, were at play and Shirley Jones ended up with the role. After an academy-award-winning performance in Elmer Gantry (1960), she was hoping to concentrate on serious roles, but instead Jones was assigned to comedies such as The Courtship of Eddie's Father (1963). Jones reluctantly fulfilled her contract despite her reluctance to take on "fluff" roles in a rom-com like A Ticklish Affair. Despite the "screen chemistry" of the leads, critics did not consider the film interesting family fare.

Principal photography for A Ticklish Affair took place in and around Naval Air Station North Island in Coronado, California, with the U.S. Navy providing access to its naval resources. (Note: Former child star and actor, Frank Coghlan, Jr., who was also a serving U.S. naval officer, provided the armed forces liaison for the film.) Former child star and actor, Lieutenant Commander Frank Coghlan, Jr., USN, who was also a serving U.S. naval officer and Naval Aviator, provided the armed forces liaison for the film. Filming at NAS North Island included scenes aboard the aircraft carrier USS Coral Sea and the use of operational aircraft and helicopters, even a U.S. Navy blimp.

== Reception ==
A Ticklish Affair was not well received by critics, who dismissed it as overly sentimental. Reviewer Colin Bennett of The Age called it, "the kind of glossy, sentimental family comedy which is made with the entire cooperation of the United States Navy. Characters and situations are from a well-tried formula ... The piece-de-resistance of this shatteringly wholesome affair is the rescue by the said navy of one small boy floating out to sea dangling from a cluster of balloons."

Film historian Eric Monder was especially critical of Shirley Jones' performance, characterizing it as "simply dull." Jones soon left Hollywood behind to star in Broadway productions and later as the matron of television's The Partridge Family (1970–1974).

== See also ==
- List of American films of 1963
- List of media set in San Diego
