= William Shust =

American actor (1928–2018)

- Born: January 14, 1928
- Died: March 14, 2018 (aged 90)
- Occupation: Actor
- Known for: Portraying Anton Chekhov in Chekhov on the Lawn

William Shust was a Ukrainian-American actor. His career lasted for over six decades and included numerous roles in Broadway, Off-Broadway and regional theater productions. He also had roles on television, film and acted in commercials.

== Early life ==
Shust (originally spelled Szust) was born January 14, 1928, in New York City to Ukrainian immigrant parents and grew up among other Ukrainian immigrant families in the area of Manhattan's East Village known as "Little Ukraine". In 1945, he graduated from Seward Park High School, which includes performing arts luminaries such as Tony Curtis, Estelle Getty, Jerry Stiller, Walter Matthau and Luis Guzman among its alumni. He went on to attend Fordham University, where he earned a B.S. in Marketing in 1949 and an MFA in Theatre in 1954.

== Career ==
Shust received great acclaim in the early 1960s for playing the leading role of Emile in the first-ever production of Felicien Marceau's The Egg in the United States. Theater critic Henry Hewes named The Egg the best play of 1961-1962 on the strength of Shust's performance.

His most notable role was his long-time portrayal of Anton Chekhov in the one-man show Chekhov on the Lawn, written and directed by Elihu Winer. Beginning in 1972, Shust performed Chekhov on the Lawn across the United States and Great Britain for close to two decades, winning the Best Performance Award at the Edinburgh Festival Fringe in 1980. In 1990, he became the first American actor to perform in Yalta when the USSR invited him to perform Chekhov on the Lawn there.

Other productions include Bertolt Brecht’s Arturo Ui (first production on Broadway, directed by Tony Richardson), The Owl and the Pussycat (Broadway, directed by Arthur Storch), Clifford Odets’ The Country Girl (Broadway, directed by John Houseman), Right You Are, Ghosts, Lovers (Roundabout Theatre), Agamemnon, Electra, Trojan Women (Theatre Marquee), Look Back in Anger (41 Street Theatre), Count Dracula (Equity Library Theatre), The Taming of the Shrew (Phoenix Theatre), and The Scarlet Letter (Gene Frankel Theatre).

Shust’s film and television work included small roles as the psychologist Dr. Fisher in Dark Shadows and Patrick Henry in the 1976 PBS historical drama miniseries The Adams Chronicles.

Being Ukrainian was an important part of Shust’s personal identity as well as his professional work. In 1951, Shust narrated a two-hour radio broadcast of a Ukrainian Christmas mass at St. George’s Ukrainian Catholic Church in New York. He frequently performed in Ukrainian productions and at various Ukrainian cultural events, including speaking at the dedication of the Taras Shevchenko Memorial in Washington, D.C. in 1964.
