= The Patty Duke Show =

American television sitcom (1963–1966)

- Season one opening
- Genre: Sitcom
- Created by: Sidney Sheldon; William Asher
- Starring: Patty Duke; William Schallert; Jean Byron; Paul O'Keefe; Eddie Applegate
- Theme music composer: Sid Ramin; Robert Wells
- Opening theme: "Cousins" performed by The Skip-Jacks
- Composers: Sid Ramin; Harry Geller
- Country of origin: United States
- Original language: English
- No. of seasons: 3
- No. of episodes: 104 (list of episodes)

Production
- Producers: William Asher (episodes 1–10); Robert Costello (episodes 11–25); Stanley Prager (episodes 26–72); Bob Sweeney (season 3)
- Camera setup: Single-camera
- Running time: 22 mins
- Production companies: Chrislaw Productions; Cottage Industries, Inc. (1965–1966); United Artists Television; MGM Television

Original release
- Network: ABC
- Release: September 18, 1963 – April 27, 1966

Related
- The Patty Duke Show: Still Rockin' In Brooklyn Heights

The Patty Duke Show is an American television sitcom created by Sidney Sheldon and William Asher. The series ran on ABC from September 18, 1963, to April 27, 1966.

The series was developed as a vehicle for teenage star Patty Duke, who had won an Academy Award the previous year. Duke starred in dual roles of "twin cousins" Patty and Cathy Lane. The series co-starred William Schallert, Jean Byron, Paul O'Keefe, and Eddie Applegate.

A total of 104 black-and-white episodes, plus an unaired pilot, were produced by United Artists Television. ABC abruptly cancelled the series after three seasons.

== Premise ==
Patty Lane (Duke) is a normal, chatty, rambunctious teenager who (according to the theme song lyrics) lives in the Brooklyn Heights section of New York City. Her father, Martin Lane (William Schallert), is the managing editor of the New York Daily Chronicle; Patty affectionately addresses him as "Poppo." Her "identical paternal cousin," Cathy Lane (also played by Duke), is sophisticated, brainy and demure; her father Kenneth (also played by Schallert) is Martin's identical twin brother. Since the widowed Kenneth is often away as a foreign correspondent for the Chronicle, Cathy moves to the United States to live with Patty's family – which also includes her mother Natalie (Jean Byron) and brother Ross (Paul O'Keefe) – and to attend Brooklyn Heights High School with Patty and her boyfriend Richard (Eddie Applegate).

While the girls are physically identical, their style, tastes and attitudes are nearly opposite, which is responsible for some of the comedic situations on the show. Though the character of "Cathy" received first billing over the character of "Patty" in the show's opening credits, virtually all episodes centered around Patty's misadventures, with Cathy often only playing a minor supporting role. The remarkable physical resemblance that Patty and Cathy share is explained by the fact that their fathers are identical twins. While Patty speaks with a typical American accent, Cathy speaks with a general European accent; not surprisingly, however, both cousins are able to mimic each other's voice. Patty and Cathy have an additional identical cousin, Southern belle Betsy (also played by Duke), featured in the season two episode "The Perfect Hostess".

== Episodes ==
Season	Episodes	Originally released	
Season	Episodes	First released	Last released
1	36	September 18, 1963	May 20, 1964
2	36	September 16, 1964	May 19, 1965
3	32	September 15, 1965	April 27, 1966

== Cast ==
The Lanes (clockwise from bottom left: Patty Duke as Patty Lane, Jean Byron as Natalie Lane, William Schallert as Martin Lane and Paul O'Keefe as Ross Lane)

- Patty Duke as Patty Lane and Cathy Lane
  - Duke also "guest-starred" as Betsy Lane in the episode "The Perfect Hostess" (1965)
- William Schallert as Martin Lane
  - Schallert also had a dual role as Kenneth Lane in three season one episodes, and as Uncle Jed in a season three episode
- Jean Byron as Natalie Lane, Patty's mother
- Paul O'Keefe as Ross Lane, Patty's brother
- Eddie Applegate as Richard Harrison, Patty's boyfriend

Rita McLaughlin served as a double for Duke in the third season, but was never credited. In the series' unaired pilot episode, Mark Miller and Charles Herbert played Martin and Ross Lane, respectively.

=== Major recurring ===
- Kitty Sullivan as Sue Ellen Turner (seasons 1-2), Patty's frenemy. She was replaced by Roz and Monica Robinson in the third season.
  - Cindy Williams portrayed Sue Ellen in Still Rockin' in Brooklyn Heights when Sullivan was unavailable.
- John McGiver as J.R. Castle (season 1), Martin's boss at the Chronicle. He is not shown or mentioned after the first season.
- David Doyle as Jonathan Harrison (seasons 1-2), Richard's father who is a construction engineer.
- John Spencer as Henry (seasons 1-2), one of Patty's classmates.
- Kelly Wood as Gloria (season 2), one of Patty's friends.
- Marcia Strassman as Adeline (season 2), one of Patty's classmates.
- Robyn Millan as Roz (season 3), one of Patty's classmates.
- Laura Barton/Kathy Garver as Monica Robinson (season 3), Patty's rival. She replaces the Sue Ellen Turner character.

=== Notable guest stars ===
- Jean-Pierre Aumont ("The French Teacher" 1963)
- Ilka Chase ("The House Guest" 1963)
- Alan Mowbray ("The Actress" 1963)
- Joan Copeland ("Are Mothers People?" 1964)
- Susan Anspach (as Susan: "Cathy, the Rebel" and "Will the Real Sammy Davis Please Hang Up?" 1965)
- Frankie Avalon ("How to Be Popular" 1963; "A Foggy Day in Brooklyn Heights" 1965)
- Kaye Ballard ("The Perfect Teenager" 1964)
- James Brolin ("Patty Meets the Great Outdoors" 1965)
- Roger C. Carmel ("Author! Author!" 1964)
- Kim Carnes ("Patty Meets the Great Outdoors" 1965)
- Jeremy Clyde ("Patty Pits Wits, Two Brits Hits" 1965)
- Sammy Davis Jr. ("Will the Real Sammy Davis Please Hang Up?" 1965)
- Jimmy Dean ("The Songwriters" 1964)
- Troy Donahue ("Operation: Tonsils" 1965)
- Dick Gautier ("Anywhere I Hang My Horn Is Home" 1966)
- George Gaynes ("The Perfect Hostess" 1965)
- Robert Goulet ("Don't Monkey with Mendel" 1965)
- Margaret Hamilton (as Maid: "Double Date" 1963; "Let 'Em Eat Cake" 1964)
- George S. Irving ("Let 'Em Eat Cake" 1964)
- Peter Lawford ("Will the Real Sammy Davis Please Hang Up?" 1965)
- Paul Lynde ("The Genius" 1963)
- Sal Mineo ("Patty Meets a Celebrity" 1965)
- Estelle Parsons ("The Con Artist" 1964)
- Neva Patterson (as Miss Mason: "The Tycoons", 1964, and Miss Moore: "My Cousin the Heroine" 1965)
- Charles Nelson Reilly ("The Conquering Hero" 1963)
- Sara Seegar ("The Greatest Speaker in the Whole Wide World" 1966)
- Frank Sinatra Jr. ("Every Girl Should Be Married" 1965)
- Jean Stapleton ("The Raffle" 1965)
- Chad Stuart ("Patty Pits Wits, Two Brits Hits" 1965)
- Daniel J. Travanti ("Block That Statue" 1964)
- Bobby Vinton ("Patty and The Newspaper Game" 1965)

== Production ==
=== Origins ===
Following her Academy Award-winning role in The Miracle Worker, ABC became interested in developing a series starring Duke. The network enlisted writer Sidney Sheldon to develop a vehicle for Duke. Sheldon asked Duke to spend a week with his family at their home to generate ideas. During this time, he noticed that Duke had two distinct sides to her personality (later in life she would be diagnosed as manic-depressive) Two years earlier, the Walt Disney comedy The Parent Trap with Hayley Mills as identical twins, had been a major success. Sheldon decided to star Duke as identical paternal cousins with contrasting personalities. According to Duke, he successfully captured her personality in the two characters.

In development, Cathy was initially from Scotland. Duke learned a true Scottish burr for the Cathy character. However, Duke's accent was done "so well they couldn't understand me", concerning producers that the viewers would not like or understand her with such a profound accent. Upon going into production for the series, Cathy had a "general European" background and accent.

The pilot episode was filmed on New Year's Day 1963 at the Metro-Goldwyn-Mayer Studios in Culver City, California. Several differences in the pilot included the series being set in San Francisco; and Mark Miller and Charles Herbert portraying Martin and Ross Lane, respectively.

One of the producers was actor Peter Lawford.

=== Seasons One and Two ===
Even before ordering the series, it was understood that production would shift from Los Angeles to New York City. In the previous decade, New York had dominated national network production. By the early 1960s, new formats and innovations such as coaxial cable service, film and video tape allowed for the industry to move to the West coast with the film industry. By 1963, most scripted programming was based in Hollywood, while New York served production for game shows (What's My Line), soap operas (As The World Turns), and late night shows (The Ed Sullivan Show). However, at 16 years old, Duke fell under California's strict child labor laws (known informally as the Coogan laws named after famed 1920s child actor Jackie Coogan), which curtailed the number of hours that child actors could work. Since New York did not have such stringent laws at the time, and Duke already resided in Manhattan, New York, the network relocated production of the series to Chelsea Studios and moved the series location to Brooklyn Heights.

Upon the series order, Miller declined to move on with the series. Schallert was hired after reading for producers, and reuniting him with Byron, his co-star from The Many Loves of Dobie Gillis (which had ended the season before). Sheldon and Asher wrote and produced the series, with Duke's managers John and Ethel Ross also serving as associate producers. According to Duke and others, the cast and crew members were unaware of their abuse of her.

William Asher initially served as producer. However, before going on the air, he had failed to finish a full-length episode. As a result, ABC assigned Robert Costello to produce, though he only remained until the twenty-fifth episode. Following his departure, frequent director Stanley Prager took over for the remainder of the first season, as well as the second season.

=== Visual effects ===
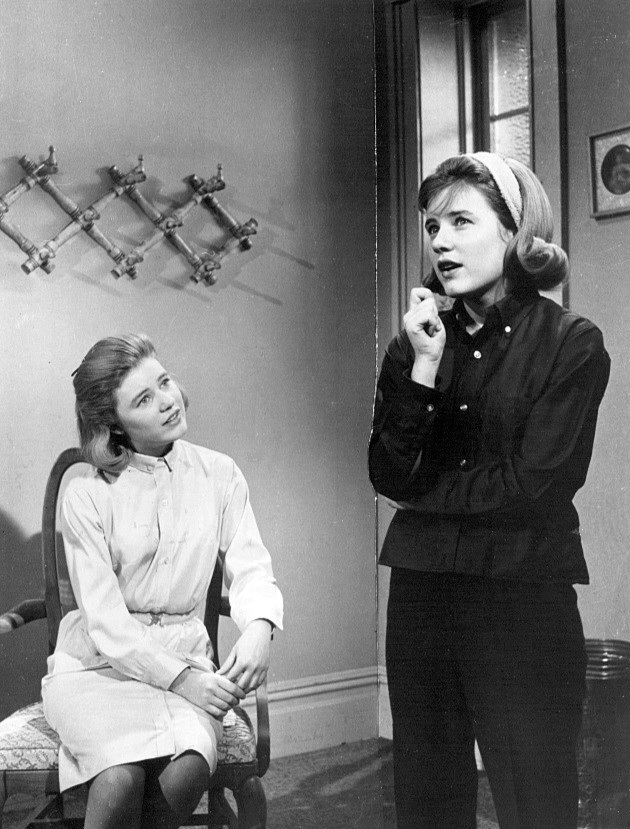
Duke as both Cathy (left) and Patty Lane.

The dual role for Duke challenged special effects for its time, considering that television special effects were rare in the early 1960s, particularly for a sitcom. In all episodes, Duke appeared as both characters in the same frame through use of a split-screen effect. The technically ambitious traveling matte process was also used from time to time, particularly in the pilot. To complement these effects, child actress Rita McLaughlin was used as Duke's double (almost always seen only from behind). To differentiate the two characters to the viewing public, the character Patty wore a flip-fall hairpiece, while Cathy's character wore a more conservative turn-under hairstyle.

=== Season Three and cancellation ===
Midway through the second season, Duke celebrated her eighteenth birthday and fired the Rosses as her managers. As Duke was now old enough to work longer hours, ABC wanted to shift the show's production to Los Angeles. Duke initially was against the idea, but eventually agreed. With the move came new sets and new exterior shots, the latter of which seemed to place the home in an unnamed suburban neighborhood instead of Brooklyn Heights.

During the second season, Duke had become romantically involved with assistant director Harry Falk, and married him during the third season. He was able to direct one of the final season three episodes – in which Patty and Richard contemplate getting married – which Duke said in hindsight "was not a good idea."

The series was cancelled due to disagreements between ABC and United Artists Television (UATV) over filming the series in color. ABC wanted all of its shows for the upcoming 1966–67 season to be in color, while UATV claimed filming The Patty Duke Show in color would be too expensive. The series continued airing reruns on ABC in primetime until August 31.

=== Music ===
The show's theme song, "Cousins," which has since been parodied many times over in pop culture (including Rocko's Modern Life where it was parodied as the theme song to "The Bloaty and Squirmy Show"), illustrates the two girls' differences: "...where Cathy adores the minuet, the Ballet Russe and crêpes Suzette, our Patty loves her rock 'n' roll, a hot dog makes her lose control..." The song was performed by a five-voice vocal ensemble called "The Skip-Jacks," a vocal group that worked with jazz musician Don Elliott and recorded numerous Little Golden Records in the sixties. One of the vocalists was named Stella Stevens, no relation to the Hollywood actor of the same name.

== Reception ==
Already a budding star in her own right, Duke was further thrust into the public consciousness through the show. As the series went on, her star power from the series allowed her to enter popular music, appearing on two episodes of Shindig! in 1965 to release a Top Ten single, "Don't Just Stand There," in one of her two appearances on the series.

PopMatters wrote that although the show's episodes are occasionally very predictable, "it's all in good fun".

=== Ratings ===
Season	Timeslot (EDT)	Season premiere	Season finale	TV season	Rank	Nielsen rating	Ref
1	Wednesday 8:00 pm	September 18, 1963	May 20, 1964	1963–64	18	23.9	
2	Wednesday 8:00 pm	September 16, 1964	May 19, 1965	1964–65	28	22.4	
3	Wednesday 8:00 pm	September 15, 1965	April 27, 1966	1965–66	94	?	

William Schallert later stated that, in the third season, the series ratings plummeted after being pitted against Lost in Space.

=== Syndication and home video ===
Repeats of The Patty Duke Show entered local markets as early as September 1966, days after exiting ABC prime time. It remained a mainstay of daytime independent station programming well into the 1970s. A new generation of viewers was introduced to the series by Nick at Nite cable, broadcasting a lengthy five-year prime time run from September 19, 1988, to August 30, 1993. On June 30, 1995, Nick at Nite showed one episode of the series during their 10th anniversary celebration. In 2005, both Nick at Nite and TV Land aired another episode of the series in honor of Nick at Nite's 20th anniversary.

In 2008, This TV began airing The Patty Duke Show as part of an early morning classic TV block. Prior to this, the show had not appeared in national syndication since Nick at Nite dropped it from its lineup in 1993. As of 2019, episodes aired on Saturday and Sunday.

Reruns of The Patty Duke Show were seen on Antenna TV from 2013 until 2015 as part of that channel's regular programming schedule. From November 4, 2013, to April 6, 2014, The Patty Duke Show aired back-to-back episodes every day from 1:00–2:00pm ET; from April 7, 2014, to August 29, 2014, The Patty Duke Show aired back-to-back episodes weekday afternoons from 2:00–3:00pm ET; from September 1, 2014, to April 3, 2015, the show aired back-to-back episodes weekday mornings from 6:00–7:00am ET; from April 6, 2015, to September 11, 2015, it aired back-to-back episodes Monday-Friday from 9:00–10:00am ET. From January 4, 2016, to September 2, 2016, the series aired weekday mornings at 6:00am–6:30am on MeTV.

The show can currently be seen on Circle.

== Reunions ==
=== The Patty Duke Show: Still Rockin' In Brooklyn Heights ===
On April 27, 1999, the thirty-third anniversary of the ABC cancellation of The Patty Duke Show, rival network CBS aired the 86-minute television film The Patty Duke Show: Still Rockin' In Brooklyn Heights, which reunited Duke, Schallert, Byron (in her final on-screen role before her death in February 2006), O'Keefe and Applegate. The film was meant to be a backdoor pilot to a revival of the series, though these plans never came to fruition.

In the film, Patty and Richard married after graduating high school, and had a son Michael (Alain Goulem) before an amicable divorce after nearly 27 years of marriage. Michael is married with a teenage daughter Molly (Jane McGregor). Patty works as the drama teacher at Brooklyn Heights High School. Cathy is widowed and living in Scotland with her teenage son Liam McAllister (Kent Riley). Martin and Natalie moved to Florida after Martin retired from The New York Daily Chronicle.

The film revolves around a Lane family reunion, where the family bands together against the plans of Sue Ellen Caldwell (portrayed present-day by Cindy Williams, since original portrayer Kitty Sullivan was unavailable) to tear down the high school for a shopping center. Patty and Richard also confront their continued feelings post-divorce, reconciling by the end of the film.

Several clips of the original series were shown as flashbacks. Kitty Sullivan is shown in one of these flashbacks.

=== Social Security campaigns ===
In 2009, Duke reprised her dual roles from the show in a public service announcement (PSA) for the Social Security Administration, in which Patty asked Cathy about where she got her information about how to get Social Security benefits and other questions, such as how to apply online. The PSA was targeted toward baby boomers who were born or who grew up in the 1960s. In 2010, the surviving cast reprised their respective roles in a series of PSAs, again for the Social Security Administration.

=== DVD releases ===
Shout! Factory has released all three seasons of The Patty Duke Show on DVD in Region 1.

DVD name	Ep #	Release date
The Complete First Season	36	September 29, 2009
The Complete Second Season	36	February 9, 2010
The Complete Third and Final Season	32	August 24, 2010

== See also ==
- The Parent Trap (1961 film starring Hayley Mills, remade in 1998 with Lindsay Lohan) — a film that where Mills, and later Lohan, also played double roles
- Liv and Maddie — Disney Channel sitcom starring Dove Cameron as twins. Duke made her final acting appearance in a season three episode playing the title characters' grandmother and great-aunt
