= Robert Costello =

American television producer

Robert Costello (1921–2014) was an American TV and film producer, writer, and director.

His productions include The Patty Duke Show (briefly), Dark Shadows, Strange Paradise, The Adams Chronicles, The Secret Storm, Ryan's Hope, Another World and The Doctors. He was a director of One Life to Live.

He was born on April 26, 1921. Costello died on May 30, 2014, at the age of 93.

== Major awards ==
- 1977, Daytime Emmy Award for Outstanding Drama Series, Ryan's Hope
- 1979, Daytime Emmy Award for Outstanding Drama Series, Ryan's Hope

He was also nominated for the Daytime Emmy Award for Outstanding Drama Series in 1978 for Ryan's Hope and in 1980 for Another World. He received nominations for the Primetime Emmy Award for Outstanding Writing for a Miniseries, Movie or a Dramatic Special in 1976 and 1977 for The Adams Chronicles.
