= Girish Bhargava =

American-Indian Film Editor (1941–2017)

Girish Kumar Bhargava (1941–2017) was an Indian-born American film editor who worked in television and cinema. He was nominated multiple times for Emmys and won it for at least two times.

== Early life and education ==
Bhargava was born in 1941 in Delhi, British India, to a family of judges and lawyers.

Bhargava earned an engineering degree from the Birla Institute of Technology before starting his career at All India Radio. He then completed an internship at Germany's ZDF broadcaster and later moved to the United States, where he joined CBS.

== Career ==
Bhargava began his career at CBS. His work led to a role at WNET in New York, where he edited several notable shows, including The Great American Dream Machine. He also made contributions to the dance-focused series Dance in America, which was part of PBS's Great Performances series. Bhargava's editing style was known for its musicality and visual storytelling, which earned him praise from many in the field, such as choreographer Martha Graham.

One of Bhargava's most well-known works was his editing on the 1987 film Dirty Dancing, in which he crafted several memorable scenes.

== Personal life ==
Bhargava married Rosaleen Brannigan in 1970, and they had two daughters, Nina and Anthea. He also had four brothers and a grandson.

== Awards and honours ==
- 1991, Emmy winner, Outstanding editing for a miniseries or a special(multi-camera production) – "The Muppets Celebrate Jim Henson", CBS
- 1976, Emmy winner, Outstanding achievement in video tape editing for a series – "The Adams Chronicles", PBS
