= Eddie Applegate =

American television actor

- Born: Edward Robert Applegate; October 4, 1935; Wyncote, Pennsylvania, U.S.
- Died: October 17, 2016 (aged 81); Los Angeles, California, U.S.
- Occupations: Actor, painter
- Years active: 1963–2013
- Spouses: Elsie Elizabeth Buettner (m. 1958; div. 1967) Tanya Maniatty (m. 1967; div. 1986): Betty Jenkins (Common Law Marriage)
- Children: 3

Edward Robert Applegate (October 4, 1935 – October 17, 2016) was an American television actor, best known for his work in the 1960s, most notably in the role of Richard Harrison, the boyfriend of Patty Lane on The Patty Duke Show.

== Early life ==
Applegate was born in Wyncote, Pennsylvania.

== Stage ==
Applegate's career began at the Bucks County Playhouse in New Hope, Pennsylvania. He was active in stock theater, particularly on the East Coast, for more than eight seasons in both winter and summer. He also had the role of Hugo Peabody in the national touring production of Bye Bye Birdie.

== Film ==
Applegate's film debut was in A Ticklish Affair (1963).

== Television ==
Applegate appeared as Richard Harrison on 70 episodes (another source says "88 of the ABC sitcom's 104 episodes") of the Patty Duke Show, which was broadcast on ABC from 1963 to 1966. He also played Bob Mooney in The Lucy Show and Willie Maxwell, a reporter, on Nancy. In the 1960s, he appeared as single episode characters in a number of other popular television shows, including Daktari and Gunsmoke.

== Later work ==
In 1999, Applegate reprised the role of Richard Harrison in a reunion, The Patty Duke Show: Still Rockin' in Brooklyn Heights. In this show, he appeared as the ex-husband of Patty Lane. (They reconcile.) Also in 1999, Applegate was featured on an episode of E! Entertainment Television's Celebrity Profile, a show which tries to answer the "whatever happened to..." question about relatively well-known entertainment personalities of the past. In the 2000s (decade), Applegate also appeared occasionally in minor movie roles, such as Exorcism (2003) and Welcome to September (2005).

In 2009, Applegate appeared as Henry in the indie thriller Rain From Stars, written by Stephen Wallis and released in the United States in 2013.

== Painting ==
After his television career faded, Applegate became more involved with painting, a hobby that he had previously taken up in order to relax when he was working regularly on television shows. He described himself as a "Realist to Impressionist painter".

== Personal life and death ==
In 1967, Applegate married Tanya Maniatty. They had three children and divorced in 1986.

Applegate lived in Chatsworth, California with his common law wife Betty. He was an active member of the San Fernando Valley Art Club, serving as vice president. He died on October 17, 2016, at a nursing home in Los Angeles after a long illness. He is survived by his children, Heather, Michael and John, and a large extended family.

Applegate's death was the third in the main cast of The Patty Duke Show in 2016, following Patty Duke (Mar. 29) and William Schallert (May 8) earlier that year.

== Filmography ==
Year	Title	Role	Notes
1963	A Ticklish Affair	Yeoman Corker Bell	
2003	Exorcism	Arch Bishop	
2005	Welcome to September	Arch Bishop	
2010	Easy A	Micah's Grandfather	
2013	Rain from Stars	Henry	(final film role)
