= Jean Byron =

American actress (1925–2006)

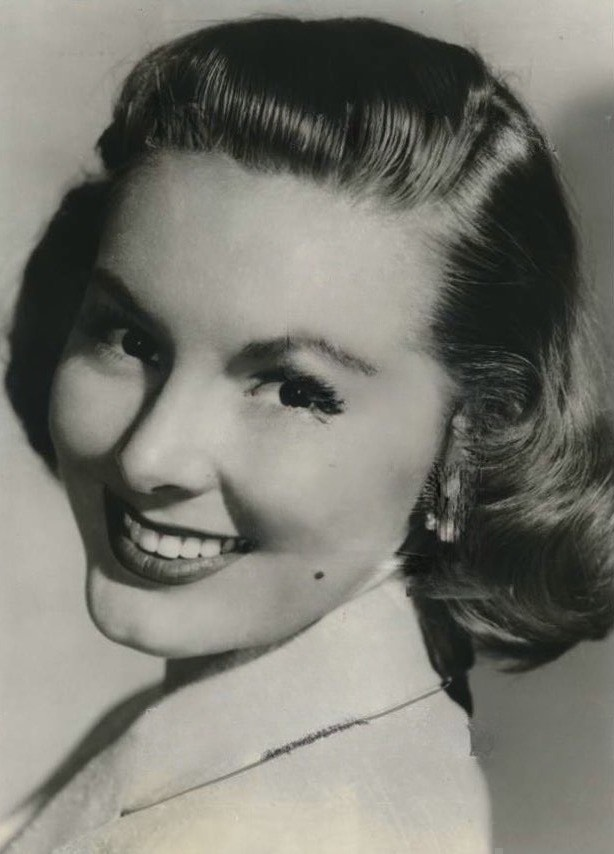
- Byron in 1955
- Born: Imogene Audette Burkhart; December 10, 1925; Paducah, Kentucky, U.S.
- Died: February 3, 2006 (aged 80); Mobile, Alabama, U.S.
- Other names: Jeane Byron; Jean Audette; Jean Burkhart
- Occupation: Actress
- Years active: 1952–1999
- Spouse: Michael Ansara (m. 1955; div. 1956)

Jean Byron (born Imogene Audette Burkhart; December 10, 1925 – February 3, 2006) was an American film, television, and stage actress. She is best known for the role of Natalie Lane, Patty Lane's mother in The Patty Duke Show. She was also known as Jean Audette and Jean Burkhart early in her career.

== Early life ==
Byron was born in Paducah, Kentucky, the daughter of Mr. and Mrs. Edward Burkhart. Her family moved to Louisville when she was still quite young, and then to California when she was 19 during World War II.

As a teenager, Byron tap danced and performed comedy. In the summer of 1939, she sang with a production company at the Iroquois Amphitheater in Louisville.

== Career ==
Byron sang on radio stations WGRC and WHAS, both in Louisville. In 1939, she was one of two winners of the regional Gateway to Hollywood competition in Louisville, which enabled her to go to Hollywood to compete at the program's next level. Byron sang on alternate days on Kentucky Karnival, a program that originated at WGRC beginning on August 30, 1943, and was distributed nationally via the Mutual Broadcasting System.

She also sang with Tommy Dorsey's band, followed by a stint with Jan Savitt's group. She then studied drama from 1947 to 1950, followed by a run with the Players Ring, but offered the performers needed exposure. There, in a play titled Merrily We Roll Along, she came to the attention of Harry Sauber, talent adviser for Sam Katzman. She was asked to read from the script and imitate a British accent, which she did. She got her union card then and there. When asked her name, she replied Imogene Burkhart. Katzman rejected that name, so she volunteered the stage name, Jean Byron, which she had already been using and which the Columbia Pictures brass found more palatable.

Byron's first film was Voodoo Tiger (1952). In the 1950s, Byron appeared in several B-movies, including The Magnetic Monster and Serpent of the Nile, in addition to guest roles on The Millionaire, The Pepsi-Cola Playhouse, Science Fiction Theatre, Fury, Bourbon Street Beat, The Cheyenne Show, plus five appearances on State Trooper. Byron also served as spokeswoman for Revlon and Lux products on NBC's The Rosemary Clooney Show. She played Minnie in the syndicated TV series Mayor of the Town (1954).

In 1959, Byron landed a semiregular spot on CBS's The Many Loves of Dobie Gillis playing Dr. Imogene Burkhart, her real name. During her time on the show, she was cast in a spinoff pilot about Dobie Gillis' girlfriend, Zelda, where she would have played the girl's mother. However, the pilot was not picked up. In the show's final season, Byron convinced producers to allow her character to discard the plain, repressed appearance she presented, and show a more modern version of a schoolteacher.

The following year, she starred in the short-lived soap opera Full Circle. In 1963, she won the role of Natalie Lane on The Patty Duke Show. After the series ended in 1966, she continued appearing in guest roles on Batman, Marcus Welby, M.D., Maude, and Hotel. She also was a regular on Pat Paulsen's Half a Comedy Hour (1970).

In addition to film and television roles, Byron worked in regional theater. She portrayed Mama Rose in Gypsy and appeared in a production of Guys and Dolls.

== Personal life and death ==
Byron was married to actor Michael Ansara from 1955 to 1956. Some sources have it as 1949 to 1956. The couple had no children and Byron never remarried.

On February 3, 2006, Byron died at the age of 80 in Mobile, Alabama, of complications following hip replacement surgery.

== Filmography ==
Film
Year	Title	Role	Notes
1952	Voodoo Tiger	Phyllis Bruce	
1953	The Magnetic Monster	Connie Stewart	
1953	Serpent of the Nile	Charmion (Cleopatra's handmaiden)	
1955	Jungle Moon Men	Ellen Marsten	
1956	There's Always Tomorrow	Miss Byron, saleswoman	Uncredited
1956	Johnny Concho	Pearl Lang	
1959	Invisible Invaders	Phyllis Penner	
1963	Wall of Noise	Mrs. Muriel Harrington	
1969	Flareup	Jerri Benton	
1972	Conquest of the Planet of the Apes	Bookstore Owner	Uncredited
1972	Where Does It Hurt?	Dr. Kincaid	
1987	Valet Girls	Edie Smegmite	
1988	The Perfect Match	Mom	
1989	Pucker Up and Bark Like a Dog	Gallery Buyer	
Television
Year	Title	Role	Notes
1954	City Detective	Reesa; Jean	2 episodes
1955	The Millionaire	Betty Jane Ryan/Bea Ryan	1 episode
1955	The Adventures of Rin Tin Tin	Irene Larrimore	1 episode
1955	You Are There	Caroline Lucas	1 episode
1955	Science Fiction Theatre		2 episodes: "The Human Equation" and "The Long Day"
1956	My Friend Flicka	Barbara Schuyler	1 episode
1956	Tales of the 77th Bengal Lancers	Katherine Cheney	1 episode
1956	State Trooper	Claire Walden, Jean Burton, Beverly, Millie Marvin, and Stella Bender (1956–1959)	5 episodes
1956	Science Fiction Theatre		2 episodes: "One Thousand Eyes" and "The Miracle Hour"
1957	The 20th Century Fox Hour	Wilma Standish	1 episode
1957	Cheyenne	Fay Kirby, newspaperwoman	Episode: "The Broken Pledge"
1958	Mickey Spillane's Mike Hammer	Miss Lewis	1 episode
1958	Jefferson Drum	Angela	1 episode
1958	Yancy Derringer	Dorinda Ashton	1 episode
1958	Official Detective	Lola Paul	Episode: "Hired Killer"
1959	The Dennis O'Keefe Show	Miss Diffendorf	1 episode
1959–1960	Bourbon Street Beat	Martha Delastone, Grace Carvay	2 episodes: "The Taste of Ashes" and "Find My Face!"
1959–1963	The Many Loves of Dobie Gillis	Dr. Imogene Burkhart, Mrs. Ruth Adams	18 episodes
1960	77 Sunset Strip	Claire Donaldson	1 episode
1960	Hawaiian Eye	Karen Ward	1 episode
1960	Tightrope	Marla Keel	1 episode
1961	Hennesey	Gloria Grayson	1 episode
1961	Bus Stop	Helen Adamson	1 episode
1962	The Detectives Starring Robert Taylor	Livona Hart	Episode: "Crossed Wires"
1963–1966	The Patty Duke Show	Natalie Lane	105 episodes
1968	Batman	Mrs. Lindseed, Mayor's Wife	1 episode
1971	Columbo	Pat	1 episode
1971	Marcus Welby, M.D.	Dr. Koerner	1 episode
1972	McCloud	Evelyn Reinhart	1 episode
1972	Mannix	Helen	1 episode
1973	Barnaby Jones	Merrick's Secretary	Episode: "Catch Me If You Can"
1974	Maude	Housekeeper Applicant	1 episode
1975	S.W.A.T.	Nurse Marlowe	1 episode
1981	The Brady Girls Get Married	Mrs. Covington, Jan Brady's mother-in-law	Television movie
1987	Hotel	Dorothy Anderson	1 episode
1999	The Patty Duke Show: Still Rockin' in Brooklyn Heights	Natalie Lane	Television movie, (final film role)

== Bibliography ==
- Parla, Paul; Charles P. Mitchell (2000). "Jean Byron: The Byronic Heroine". Screen Sirens Scream! Interviews with 20 Actresses from Science Fiction, Horror, Film Noir and Mystery Movies, 1930s to 1960s. Jefferson, N.C. and London: McFarland. pp. 21–34. ISBN 0-7864-0701-8.
