= Rock music =

Broad genre of popular music

Rock
- Stylistic origins: Rock and roll; rockabilly; blues; electric blues; folk; country; rhythm and blues; jazz
- Cultural origins: 1940s–1950s, Southern and Midwestern United States
- Typical instruments: Guitars (typically acoustic guitars and electric guitars); bass guitars; drums; keyboards; pianos; vocals
- Derivative forms: New wave; post-progressive; progressive pop

Subgenres
- Acid rock; alternative rock (grunge); arena rock; art rock; beat music; christian rock; death rock; experimental rock; garage rock; glam rock; hard rock; hardcore punk (subgenres); heartland rock; heavy metal (subgenres); indie rock; noise rock; occult rock; pop rock; post-punk; post-rock; power pop; progressive rock; psychedelic rock; punk rock (subgenres); roots rock; soft rock; stoner rock; surf rock (complete list)

Fusion genres
- Baroque pop; blues rock; country rock; dance rock; electronic rock; folk rock; funk rock; industrial rock; jazz rock; Latin rock; raga rock; rap rock; reggae rock; samba rock; sufi rock

Regional scenes
- Argentina; Armenia; Australia; Azerbaijan; Bangladesh; Belarus; Belgium; Bosnia and Herzegovina; Brazil; Canada; Chile; China; Colombia; Cuba; Croatia; Denmark; Dominican Republic; Ecuador; Estonia; Finland; France; Greece; Germany; Guatemala; Haiti; Hungary; Iceland; India; Indonesia; Iran; Ireland; Israel; Italy; Japan; Latvia; Lithuania; Malaysia; Mexico; Nepal; New Zealand; Norway; Pakistan; Peru; Philippines; Poland; Portugal; Puerto Rico; Romania; Russia; Sahara desert region; Serbia; Slovenia; South Korea; Spain; Sri Lanka; Spanish-speaking world; Sweden; Switzerland; Taiwan; Tatar; Thailand; Turkey; Ukraine; United Kingdom; United States; Southern; Uruguay; Venezuela; Yugoslavia; Zambia

Local scenes
- Seattle grunge; Madchester; Palm Desert Scene; San Francisco sound; Trøndelag

Other topics
- Afro fusion; album era; backbeat; distortion; Hall of Fame; pop; progressive music; relationship with electronics; rock band; rock music terms; rock opera; rockism; social impact

Rock music is a genre of popular music that originated in the United States as "rock and roll" in the late 1940s and early 1950s, developing into a range of styles from the late 1950s to mid-1960s, primarily in the United States and United Kingdom. It has its roots beginning as classic rock and roll, a style that drew from the African-American musical genres of blues and rhythm and blues, as well as from country music. Rock also drew strongly from genres such as electric blues and folk, and incorporated influences from jazz and other styles. Rock is typically centered on the electric guitar, usually as part of a rock group with an electric bass guitar, drums, and one or more singers.

Usually, rock is song-based music with a 4/4 time signature and using a verse–chorus form; however, the genre has become extremely diverse. Like pop music, lyrics often stress romantic love but also address a wide variety of other themes that are frequently social or political. Rock was the most popular genre of music in the U.S. and much of the western world from the 1960s up to the 2010s.

Rock musicians in the mid-1960s began to advance the album ahead of the single as the dominant form of recorded music expression and consumption, with the Beatles at the forefront of this development. Their contributions lent the genre a cultural legitimacy in the mainstream and initiated a rock-informed album era in the music industry for the next several decades. By the late 1960s "classic rock" period, a few distinct rock music subgenres had emerged, including hybrids like blues rock, folk rock, country rock, southern rock, raga rock, and jazz rock, which contributed to the development of psychedelic rock, influenced by the countercultural psychedelic and hippie scene. New genres that emerged included progressive rock, which extended artistic elements, heavy metal, which emphasized an aggressive thick sound, and glam rock, which highlighted showmanship and visual style. In the second half of the 1970s, punk rock reacted by producing stripped-down, energetic social and political critiques. Punk was an influence in the 1980s on new wave, post-punk and eventually alternative rock.

From the 1990s, alternative rock began to dominate rock music and break into the mainstream in the form of grunge, Britpop, and indie rock. Further subgenres have since emerged, including pop-punk, electronic rock, rap rock, and rap metal. Some movements were conscious attempts to revisit rock's history, including the garage rock and post-punk revival in the 2000s. Since the 2010s, rock has lost its position as the pre-eminent popular music genre in world culture, but remains commercially successful. The increased influence of hip-hop and electronic dance music can be seen in rock music, notably in the techno-pop scene of the early 2010s and the pop-punk-hip-hop revival of the 2020s.

Rock has also embodied and served as the vehicle for cultural and social movements, leading to major subcultures, including the greasers in the U.S. during the 1950s to mid 1960s, with also the teddy boys and rockers in the U.K., the hippie movement and the wider western counterculture movement that spread out from San Francisco in the U.S. in the 1960s, the latter of which continues to this day. Similarly, 1970s punk culture spawned the goth, punk, and emo subcultures. Inheriting the folk tradition of the protest song, rock music has been associated with political activism, as well as changes in social attitudes to race, sex, and drug use, and is often seen as an expression of youth revolt against adult conformity. At the same time, it has been commercially highly successful, leading to accusations of selling out.

== Characteristics ==
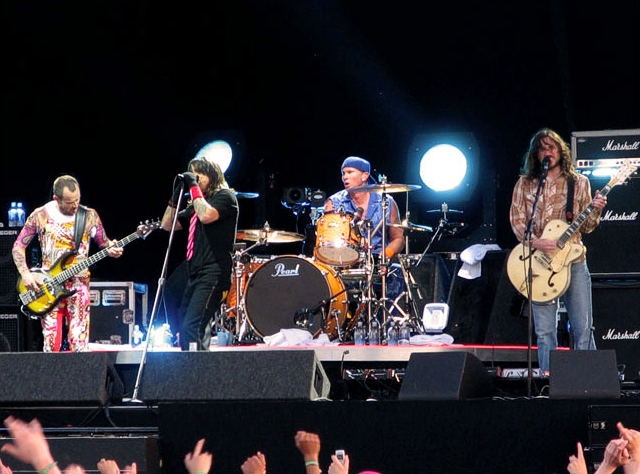
The rock band Red Hot Chili Peppers at the Pinkpop Festival in 2006

The sound of rock is traditionally centered on the amplified electric guitar, which emerged in its modern form in the 1950s with the popularity of rock and roll. It was also greatly influenced by the sounds of electric blues guitarists. The sound of an electric guitar in rock music is typically supported by an electric bass guitar, which pioneered jazz music in the same era, and by percussion produced from a drum kit that combines drums and cymbals. This trio of instruments has often been complemented by the inclusion of other instruments, particularly keyboards such as the piano, the Hammond organ, and the synthesizer. The basic rock instrumentation was derived from the basic electric blues band instrumentation (prominent lead guitar, second chordal instrument, bass, and drums). A group of musicians performing rock music is termed as a rock band or a rock group. It typically consists of between three (the power trio) and five members. Classically, a rock band takes the form of a quartet whose members cover one or more roles, including vocalist, lead guitarist, rhythm guitarist, bass guitarist, drummer, and often keyboard player or another instrumentalist.

A simple 4/4 drum pattern common in rock music

Rock music is traditionally built on a foundation of simple syncopated rhythms in a 4/4 meter, with a repetitive snare drum back beat on beats two and four. Melodies often originate from older musical modes such as the Dorian and Mixolydian, as well as the major and minor scales. Harmonies range from the common triad to parallel perfect fourths and fifths and dissonant harmonic progressions. Since the late 1950s, and particularly from the mid-1960s onwards, rock music often used the verse–refrain structure derived from blues and folk music, but there has been considerable variation from this model. Critics have stressed the eclecticism and stylistic diversity of rock. Because of its complex history and its tendency to borrow from other musical and cultural forms, it has been argued that "it is impossible to bind rock music to a rigidly delineated musical definition." In 1981, music journalist Robert Christgau said, "the best rock jolts folk-art virtues—directness, utility, natural audience—into the present with shots of modern technology".

Rock and roll was conceived as an outlet for adolescent yearnings ... To make rock and roll is also an ideal way to explore intersections of sex, love, violence, and fun, to broadcast the delights and limitations of the regional, and to deal with the depredations and benefits of mass culture itself.

— Rock music critic Robert Christgau in Christgau's Record Guide in 1981

Unlike many earlier styles of popular music, rock lyrics have dealt with a wide range of themes, including romantic love, sex, rebellion against the establishment, social concerns, and life styles. These themes were inherited from a variety of sources such as the Tin Pan Alley pop tradition, folk music, and rhythm and blues. Christgau characterizes rock lyrics as a "cool medium" with simple diction and repeated refrains, and asserts that rock's primary "function" "pertains to music, or, more generally, noise." The predominance of white, male, and often middle class musicians in rock music has often been noted, and rock has been seen as an appropriation of Black musical forms for a young, white and largely male audience. As a result, it has also been seen to articulate the concerns of this group in both style and lyrics. Christgau, writing in 1972, said in spite of some exceptions, "rock and roll usually implies an identification of male sexuality and aggression".

Since the term "rock" started being used in preference to "rock and roll" from the late 1960s, it has usually been contrasted with pop music, with which it has shared many characteristics. However, rock is often distanced from pop: the former has an emphasis on musicianship, live performance, and a focus on serious and progressive themes as part of an ideology of authenticity that is frequently combined with an awareness of the genre's history and development. According to Simon Frith, rock was "something more than pop, something more than rock and roll" and "rock musicians combined an emphasis on skill and technique with the romantic concept of art as artistic expression, original and sincere".

In the new millennium, the term rock has occasionally been used as a blanket term including forms like pop music, reggae music, soul music, and even hip-hop, which it has been influenced with but often contrasted through much of the latter's history. Christgau has used the term broadly to refer to popular and semipopular music that caters to his sensibility as "a rock-and-roller", including a fondness for a good beat, a meaningful lyric with some wit, and the theme of youth, which holds an "eternal attraction" so objective "that all youth music partakes of sociology and the field report."

== 1940s–1950s: Birth of rock and roll ==
=== Rock and roll ===
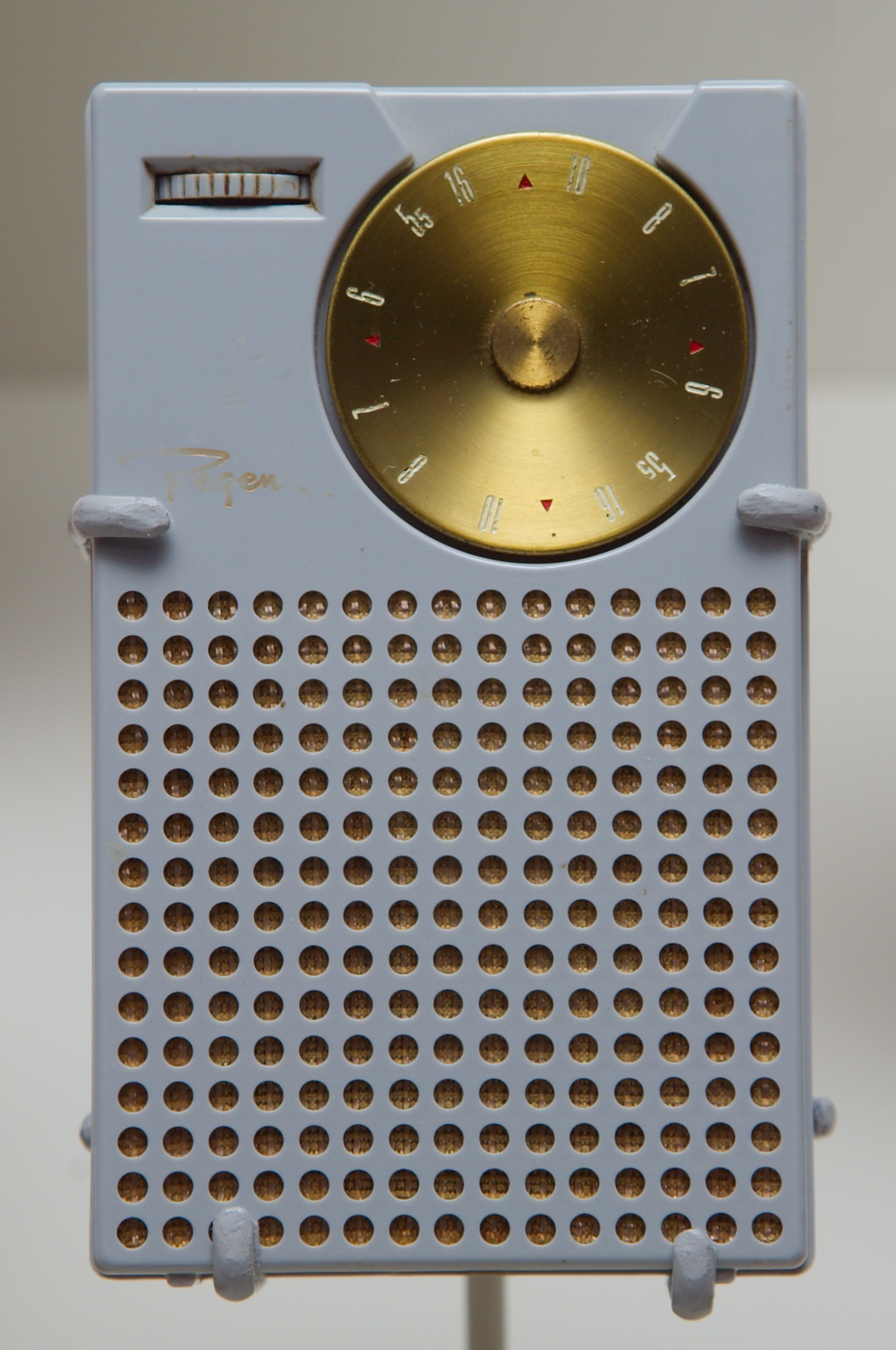
The Regency TR-1, the first commercial transistor radio, was released in 1954. Transistor radios pioneered portable AM radio and the introduction of rock and roll music into American households.

The foundations of rock music are in rock and roll, which originated in the United States during the late 1940s and early 1950s; the genre spread to much of the rest of the world. Its origins lay in a melding of various black musical genres of the time, including rhythm and blues and gospel music, with country and western.

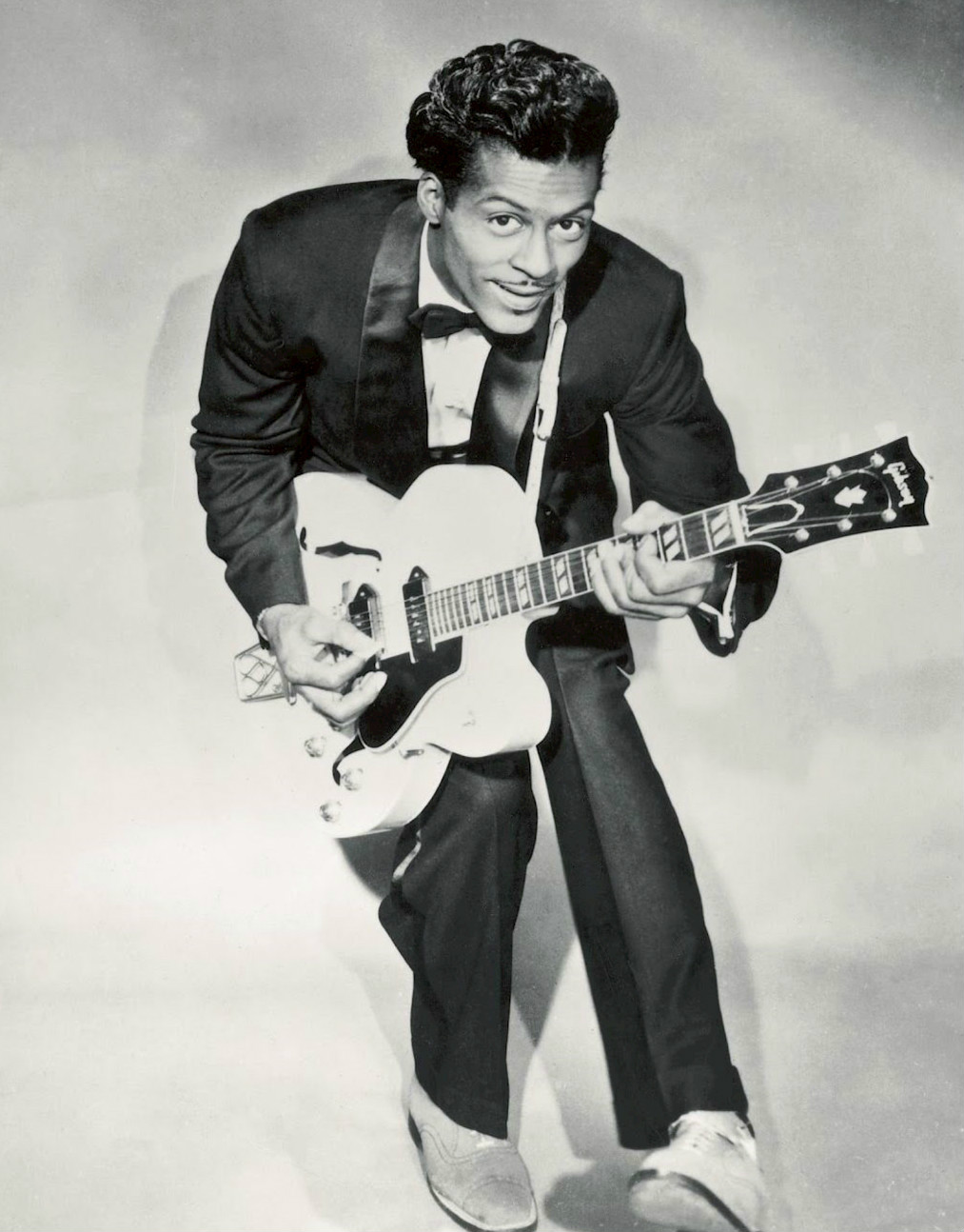
Chuck Berry in a 1958 publicity photo

Debate surrounds the many recordings which have been suggested as "the first rock and roll record". Contenders include "Strange Things Happening Every Day" by Sister Rosetta Tharpe (1944); "That's All Right" by Arthur Crudup (1946), which was later covered by Elvis Presley in 1954; "The House of Blue Lights" by Ella Mae Morse and Freddie Slack (1946); Wynonie Harris' "Good Rocking Tonight" (1948); Goree Carter's "Rock Awhile" (1949); Jimmy Preston's "Rock the Joint" (1949), also covered by Bill Haley & His Comets in 1952; and "Rocket 88" by Jackie Brenston and his Delta Cats (in fact, Ike Turner and his band the Kings of Rhythm), recorded by Sam Phillips for Chess Records in 1951.

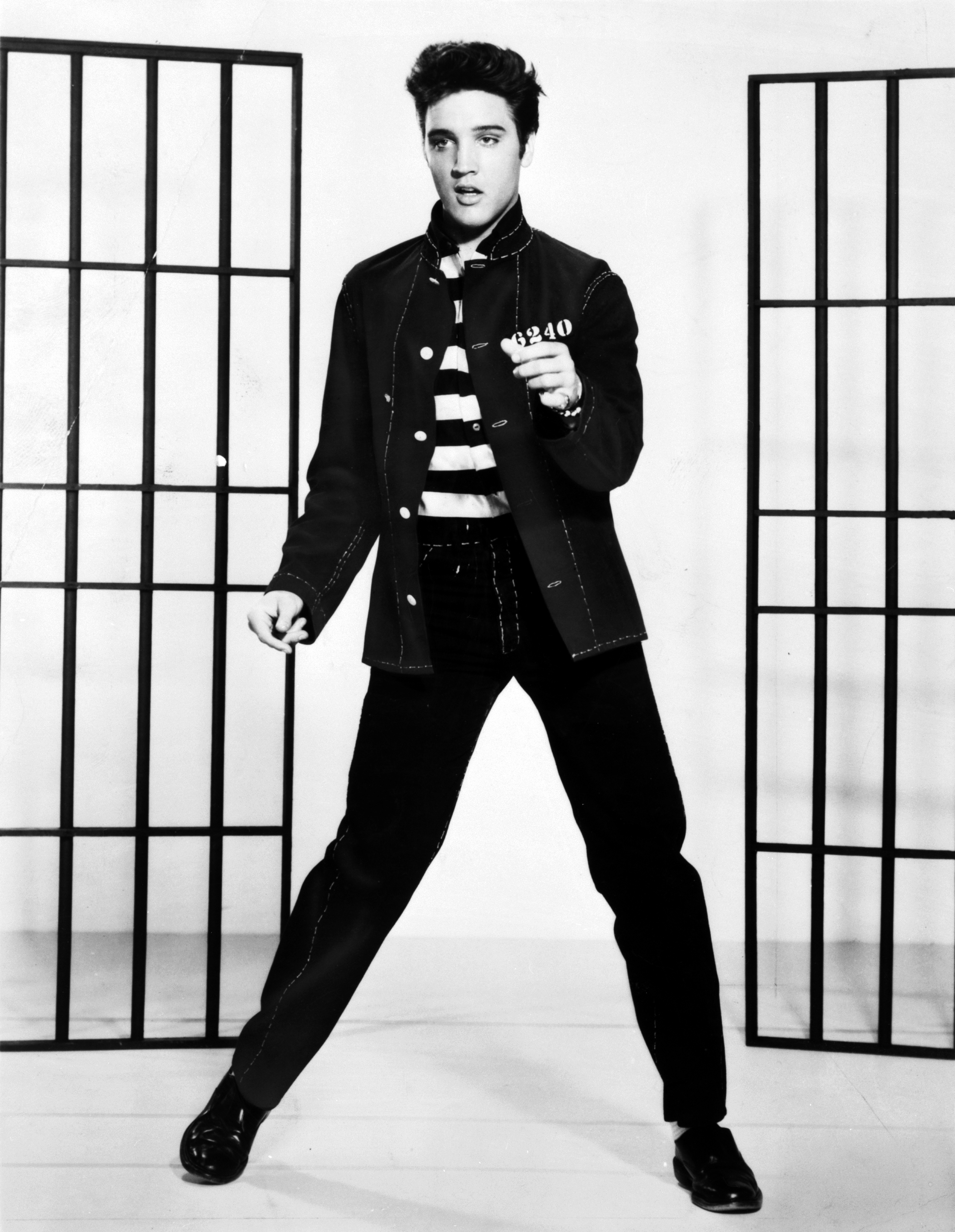
Elvis Presley in a promotion shot for Jailhouse Rock in 1957

In 1951, Cleveland, Ohio, disc jockey Alan Freed began playing rhythm and blues music (then termed "race music") for a multi-racial audience, and is credited with first using the phrase "rock and roll" to describe the music. Four years later, Bill Haley's "Rock Around the Clock" (1954) became the first rock and roll song to top Billboard magazine's main sales and airplay charts, and opened the door worldwide for this new wave of popular culture. Other artists with early rock and roll hits included Chuck Berry, Bo Diddley, Fats Domino, Little Richard, Jerry Lee Lewis, and Gene Vincent. Soon rock and roll was the major force in American record sales and crooners, such as Eddie Fisher, Perry Como, and Patti Page, who had dominated the previous decade of popular music, found their access to the pop charts significantly curtailed.

Rock and roll has led to a number of distinct subgenres, including rockabilly, combining rock and roll with "hillbilly" country music, which was usually played and recorded in the mid-1950s by white singers such as Carl Perkins, Jerry Lee Lewis, Roy Orbison, Buddy Holly and with the greatest commercial success, Elvis Presley. Hispanic and Latino American movements in rock and roll, which would eventually lead to the success of Latin rock and Chicano rock within the US, began to rise in the Southwest; with rock and roll standard musician Ritchie Valens and even those within other heritage genres, such as Al Hurricane along with his brothers Tiny Morrie and Baby Gaby as they began combining rock and roll with country-western within traditional New Mexico music. In addition, the 1950s saw the growth in popularity of the electric guitar, and the development of a specifically rock and roll style of playing through such exponents as Chuck Berry, Link Wray, and Scotty Moore. The use of distortion, pioneered by Western swing guitarists such as Junior Barnard and Eldon Shamblin was popularized by Chuck Berry in the mid-1950s. The use of power chords, pioneered by Francisco Tárrega and Heitor Villa-Lobos in the 19th century and later on by Willie Johnson and Pat Hare in the early 1950s, was popularized by Link Wray in the late 1950s.

Commentators have perceived a decline of rock and roll in the late 1950s and early 1960s. By 1959, the death of Buddy Holly, the Big Bopper and Ritchie Valens in a plane crash, the departure of Elvis for the army, the retirement of Little Richard to become a preacher, prosecutions of Jerry Lee Lewis and Chuck Berry and the breaking of the payola scandal (which implicated major figures, including Alan Freed, in bribery and corruption in promoting individual acts or songs), gave a sense that the rock and roll era established at that point had come to an end.

=== Global spread ===
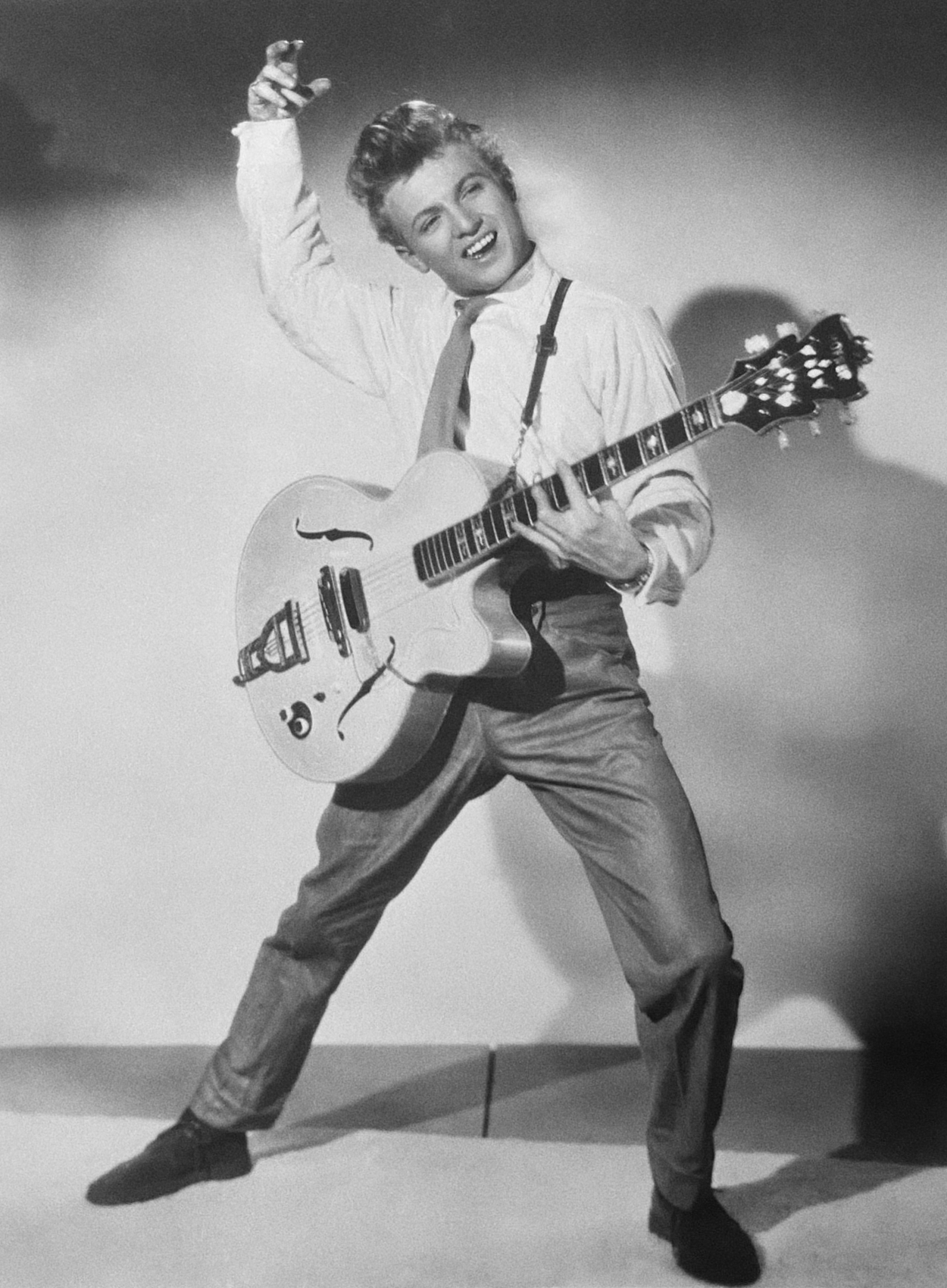
British rock and roll singer Tommy Steele in a 1958 promotional photo

Rock quickly spread out from its origins in the US, associated with the rapid Americanization that was taking place globally in the aftermath of the Second World War. Cliff Richard is credited with one of the first rock and roll hits outside of North America with "Move It" (1959), effectively ushering in the sound of British rock. Several artists, most prominently Tommy Steele from the UK, found success with covers of major American rock and roll hits before the recordings could spread internationally, often translating them into local languages where appropriate. Steele in particular toured Britain, Scandinavia, Australia, the USSR and South Africa from 1955 to 1957, influencing the globalisation of rock. Johnny O'Keefe's 1958 record "Wild One" was one of the earliest Australian rock and roll hits. By the late 1950s, as well as in the American-influenced Western world, rock was popular in communist states such as Yugoslavia, and the USSR, as well as in regions such as South America.

In the late 1950s and early 1960s, U.S. blues music and blues rock artists, who had been surpassed by the rise of rock and roll in the US, found new popularity in the UK, visiting with successful tours. Lonnie Donegan's 1955 hit "Rock Island Line" was a major influence and helped to develop the trend of skiffle music groups throughout the country, many of which, including John Lennon's Quarrymen (later the Beatles), moved on to play rock and roll. While former rock and roll market in the US was becoming dominated by lightweight pop and ballads, British rock groups at clubs and local dances were developing a style more strongly influenced by blues-rock pioneers, and were starting to play with an intensity and drive seldom found in white American acts; this influence would go on to shape the future of rock music through the British Invasion.

== 1960s: British invasion and broadening sound ==
The first four years of the 1960s have often been seen as an era of hiatus for rock and roll. However, some authors have emphasised innovations and trends in this period without which future developments would not have been possible. While early rock and roll, particularly through the advent of rockabilly, saw the greatest commercial success for male and white performers, in this era the genre was dominated by black and female artists. Rock and roll had not disappeared entirely from music at the end of the 1950s and some of its energy can be seen in the various dance crazes of the early 1960s, started by Chubby Checker's record "The Twist" (1960). (Note: Having died down in the late 1950s, doo wop enjoyed a revival in the same period, with hits for acts like the Marcels, the Capris, Maurice Williams and the Zodiacs, and Shep and the Limelights. The rise of girl groups like the Chantels, the Shirelles and the Crystals placed an emphasis on harmonies and polished production that was in contrast to earlier rock and roll. Some of the most significant girl group hits were products of the Brill Building Sound, named after the block in New York where many songwriters were based, which included the number 1 hit for the Shirelles "Will You Love Me Tomorrow" in 1960, penned by the partnership of Gerry Goffin and Carole King.) Some music historians have also pointed to important and innovative technical developments that built on rock and roll in this period, including the electronic treatment of sound by such innovators as Joe Meek, and the elaborate production methods of the Wall of Sound pursued by Phil Spector.

=== Instrumental rock and surf rock ===
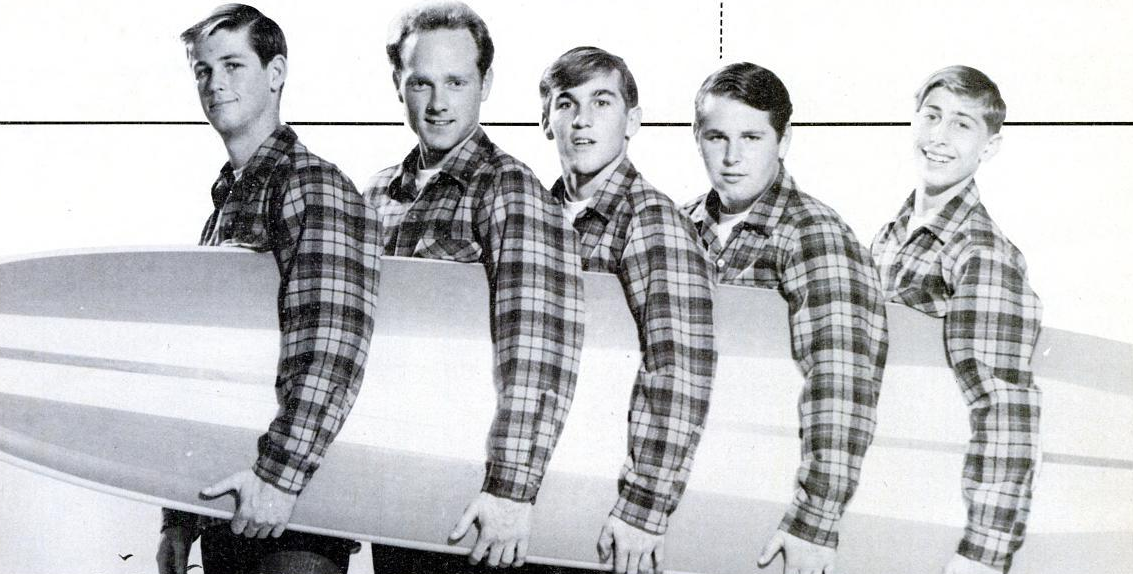
A 1963 publicity photo of the Beach Boys

The instrumental rock and roll of performers such as Duane Eddy, Link Wray and the Ventures was further developed by Dick Dale, who added distinctive "wet" reverb, rapid alternate picking, and Middle Eastern and Mexican influences. He produced the regional hit "Let's Go Trippin'" in 1961 and launched the surf music craze, following up with songs like "Misirlou" (1962). Like Dale and his Del-Tones, most early surf bands were formed in Southern California, including the Bel-Airs, the Challengers, and Eddie & the Showmen. The Chantays scored a top ten national hit with "Pipeline" in 1963 and probably the best-known surf tune was 1963's "Wipe Out", by the Surfaris, which hit number 2 and number 10 on the Billboard charts in 1965. Surf rock was also popular in Europe during this time, with the British group the Shadows scoring hits in the early 1960s with instrumentals such as "Apache" (1960) and "Kon-Tiki" (1961), while Swedish surf group the Spotnicks saw success in both Sweden and Britain.

Surf music achieved its greatest commercial success as vocal pop music, particularly the work of the Beach Boys, formed in 1961 in Southern California. Their early albums featured both instrumental surf rock (including covers of music by Dick Dale) and vocal songs, drawing on rock and roll and doo wop and the close harmonies of vocal pop acts like the Four Freshmen. The Beach Boys first chart hit, "Surfin'" (1961), reached the Billboard top 100 and helped make the surf music craze a national phenomenon. The surf music craze and the careers of almost all surf acts were effectively ended by 1965 after the arrival of the British Invasion. (Note: Only the Beach Boys were able to sustain a creative career into the mid-1960s, producing a string of hit singles and albums, including the highly regarded Pet Sounds in 1966, which made them, arguably, the only American rock or pop act that could rival the Beatles.)

=== British Invasion ===
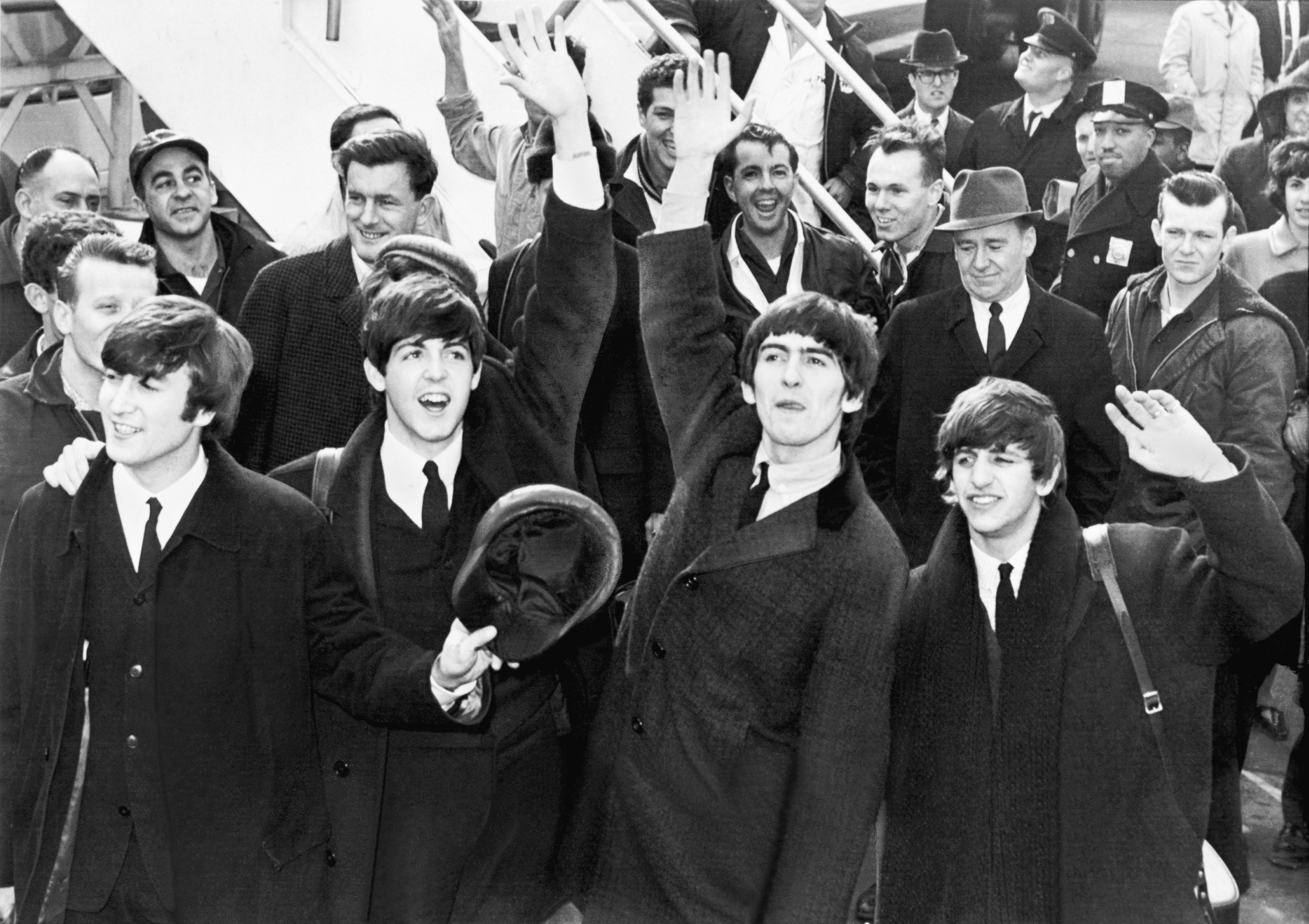
The Beatles arriving at John F. Kennedy International Airport in New York City at the start of the British Invasion in February 1964

By the end of 1962, what would become the British rock scene had started with beat groups like the Beatles, Gerry & the Pacemakers and the Searchers from Liverpool and Freddie and the Dreamers, Herman's Hermits and the Hollies from Manchester. They drew on a wide range of American influences including 1950s rock and roll, soul, rhythm and blues, and surf music, initially reinterpreting standard American tunes and playing for dancers. Bands like the Animals from Newcastle and Them from Belfast, and those from London like the Rolling Stones and the Yardbirds, were more directly influenced by rhythm and blues and later blues music. Soon these groups were composing their own material, combining US forms of music and infusing it with a high energy beat. Beat bands tended towards "bouncy, irresistible melodies", while early British blues acts tended towards less sexually innocent, more aggressive songs, often adopting an anti-establishment stance. There was, however, particularly in the early stages, considerable musical crossover between the two tendencies. By 1963, led by the Beatles, beat groups had begun to achieve national success in Britain, soon to be followed into the charts by the more rhythm and blues focused acts.

"I Want to Hold Your Hand" was the Beatles' first number one hit on the Billboard Hot 100, spending seven weeks at the top and a total of 15 weeks on the chart. Their first appearance on The Ed Sullivan Show on 9 February 1964, drawing an estimated 73 million viewers (at the time a record for an American television program) is considered a milestone in American pop culture. During the week of 4 April 1964, the Beatles held 12 positions on the Billboard Hot 100 singles chart, including the entire top five. The Beatles went on to become the biggest selling rock band of all time and they were followed into the US charts by numerous British bands. During the next two years, British acts dominated their own and the US charts with Peter and Gordon, the Animals, Manfred Mann, Petula Clark, Freddie and the Dreamers, Wayne Fontana and the Mindbenders, Herman's Hermits, the Rolling Stones, the Troggs, and Donovan all having one or more number one singles. Other major acts that were part of the invasion included the Kinks, the Who, and the Dave Clark Five.

The British Invasion helped internationalize the production of rock and roll, opening the door for subsequent British (and Irish) performers to achieve international success. In America it arguably spelled the end of instrumental surf music, vocal girl groups and (for a time) the teen idols, that had dominated the American charts in the late 1950s and 1960s. It dented the careers of established R&B acts like Fats Domino and Chubby Checker and even temporarily derailed the chart success of surviving rock and roll acts, including Elvis. The British Invasion also played a major part in the rise of a distinct genre of rock music, and cemented the primacy of the rock group, based on guitars and drums and producing their own material as singer-songwriters. Following the example set by the Beatles' 1965 LP Rubber Soul in particular, other British rock acts released rock albums intended as artistic statements in 1966, including the Rolling Stones' Aftermath, the Beatles' own Revolver, and the Who's A Quick One, as well as American acts in the Beach Boys (Pet Sounds) and Bob Dylan (Blonde on Blonde).

=== Blues rock ===
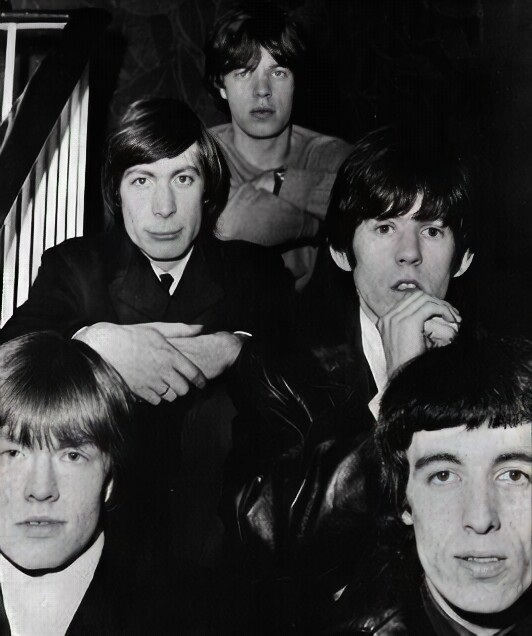
The Rolling Stones in 1965

Although the first impact of the British Invasion on American popular music was through beat and R&B based acts, the impetus was soon taken up by a second wave of bands that drew their inspiration more directly from American blues, including the Rolling Stones and the Yardbirds. British blues musicians of the late 1950s and early 1960s had been inspired by the acoustic playing of figures such as Lead Belly, who was a major influence on the Skiffle craze, and Robert Johnson. Increasingly they adopted a loud amplified sound, often centered on the electric guitar, based on the Chicago blues, particularly after the tour of Britain by Muddy Waters in 1958, which prompted Cyril Davies and guitarist Alexis Korner to form the band Blues Incorporated. The band involved and inspired many of the figures of the subsequent British blues boom, including members of the Rolling Stones and Cream, combining blues standards and forms with rock instrumentation and emphasis.

The other key focus for British blues was John Mayall; his band, the Bluesbreakers, included Eric Clapton (after Clapton's departure from the Yardbirds) and later Peter Green. Particularly significant was the release of Blues Breakers with Eric Clapton (Beano) album (1966), considered one of the seminal British blues recordings and the sound of which was much emulated in both Britain and the United States. Eric Clapton went on to form supergroups Cream, Blind Faith, and Derek and the Dominos, followed by an extensive solo career that helped bring blues rock into the mainstream. Green, along with the Bluesbreaker's rhythm section Mick Fleetwood and John McVie, formed Peter Green's Fleetwood Mac, who enjoyed some of the greatest commercial success in the genre. In the late 1960s Jeff Beck, also an alumnus of the Yardbirds, moved blues rock in the direction of heavy rock with his band, the Jeff Beck Group. The last Yardbirds guitarist was Jimmy Page, who went on to form The New Yardbirds which rapidly became Led Zeppelin. Many of the songs on their first three albums, and occasionally later in their careers, were expansions on traditional blues songs.

In the United States, blues rock had been pioneered in the early 1960s by guitarist Lonnie Mack; however, the genre began to take off in the mid-1960s as acts developed a sound similar to British blues musicians. Key acts included Paul Butterfield (whose band acted like Mayall's Bluesbreakers in Britain as a starting point for many successful musicians), Canned Heat, the early Jefferson Airplane, Janis Joplin, Johnny Winter, the J. Geils Band, and Jimi Hendrix with his power trios, the Jimi Hendrix Experience (which included two British members, and was founded in Britain), and Band of Gypsys, whose guitar virtuosity and showmanship would be among the most emulated of the decade. Blues rock bands from the southern states, like the Allman Brothers Band, Lynyrd Skynyrd, and ZZ Top, incorporated country elements into their style to produce the distinctive genre Southern rock.

Blues rock bands often emulated jazz, playing long, involved improvisations, which would later be a major element of progressive rock. From about 1967 bands like Cream and the Jimi Hendrix Experience had moved away from purely blues-based music into psychedelia. By the 1970s, blues rock had become heavier and more riff-based, exemplified by the work of Led Zeppelin and Deep Purple, and the lines between blues rock and hard rock "were barely visible", as bands began recording rock-style albums. The genre was continued in the 1970s by figures such as George Thorogood and Pat Travers, but, particularly on the British scene (except perhaps for the advent of groups such as Status Quo and Foghat who moved towards a form of high energy and repetitive boogie rock), the subgenre became focused on heavy metal, and blues rock began to slip out of the mainstream.

=== Garage rock ===
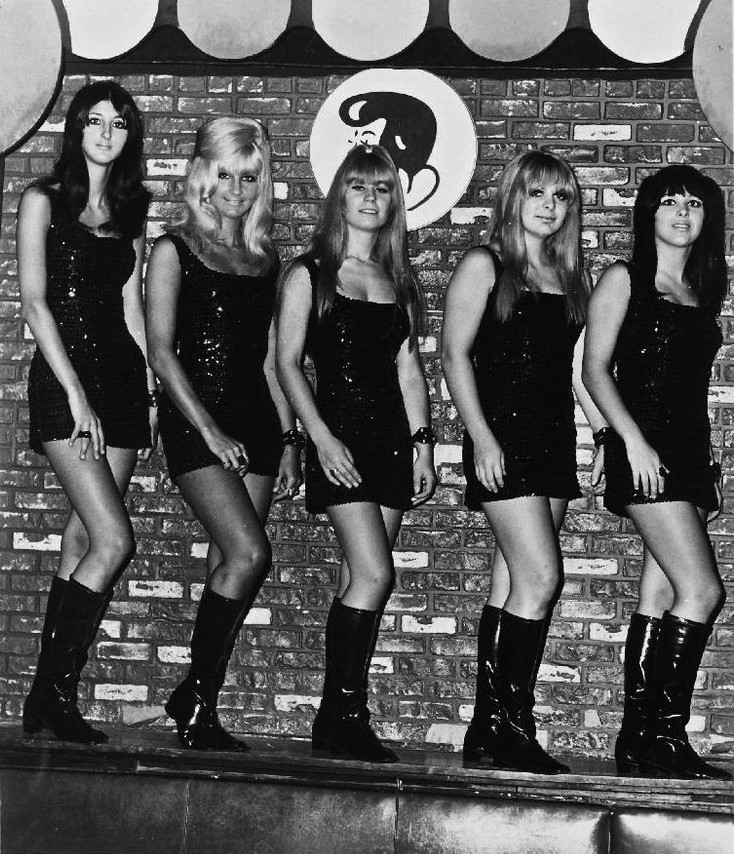
The Pleasure Seekers, an all-female garage rock group featuring Suzi Quatro, in 1964

Garage rock was a raw form of rock music, particularly prevalent in North America in the mid-1960s and so called because of the perception that it was rehearsed in the suburban family garage. Garage rock songs often revolved around the traumas of high school life, with songs about "lying girls" and unfair social circumstances being particularly common. The lyrics and delivery tended to be more aggressive than was common at the time, often with growled or shouted vocals that dissolved into incoherent screaming. They ranged from crude one-chord music (like the Seeds) to near-studio musician quality (including the Knickerbockers, the Remains, and the Fifth Estate). There were also regional variations in many parts of the country with flourishing scenes particularly in California and Texas.

The style had been evolving from regional scenes as early as 1958. "Tall Cool One" (1959) by the Wailers (from Tacoma, Washington) and the 1963 version of "Louie Louie" by the Kingsmen (Portland, Oregon) are mainstream examples of the genre in its formative stages. By 1963, garage band singles were creeping into the national charts in greater numbers, including Paul Revere and the Raiders (Boise), the Trashmen (Minneapolis) and the Rivieras (South Bend, Indiana). Other influential garage bands, such as the Sonics (Tacoma, Washington), never reached the Billboard Hot 100.

The British Invasion greatly influenced garage bands, providing them with a national audience, leading many (often surf or hot rod groups) to adopt a British influence, and encouraging more groups to form. Several garage bands in the United States and Canada produced regional hits during the era. Despite scores of bands being signed to major or large regional labels, most were commercial failures. Garage rock peaked both commercially and artistically around 1966, and by 1968 the style largely disappeared from the national charts and at the local level. New styles had evolved to replace garage rock. (Note: In Detroit, garage rock's legacy remained alive into the early 1970s, with bands such as the MC5 and the Stooges, who employed a much more aggressive approach to the form. These bands began to be labelled punk rock and are now often seen as proto-punk or proto-hard rock.)

=== Folk rock ===
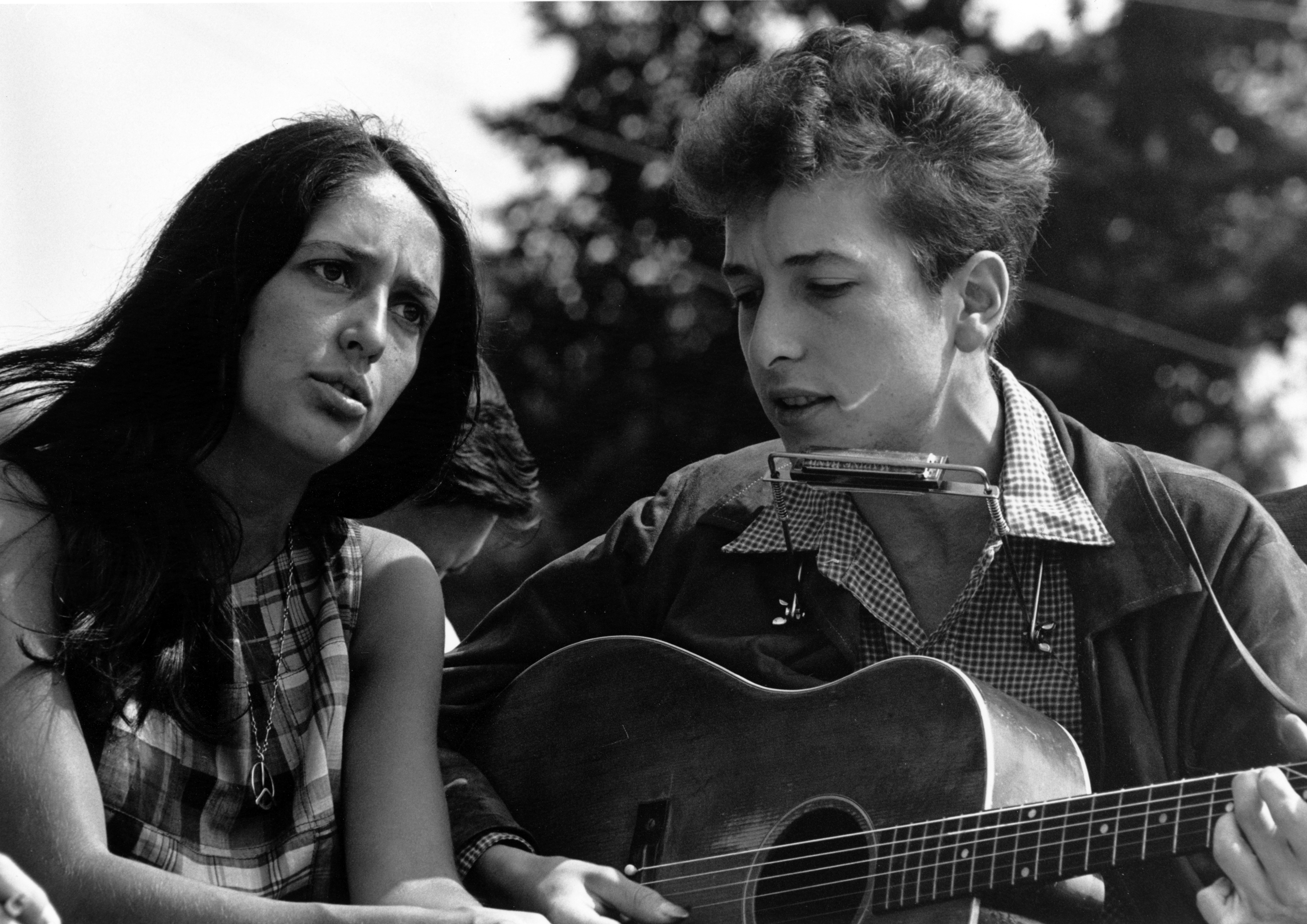
Joan Baez and Bob Dylan in 1963

By the 1960s, the scene that had developed out of the American folk music revival had grown to a major movement, using traditional music and new compositions in a traditional style, usually on acoustic instruments. In America the genre was pioneered by figures such as Woody Guthrie and Pete Seeger and often identified with progressive or labor politics. In the early sixties figures such as Joan Baez and Bob Dylan had come to the fore in this movement as singer-songwriters. Dylan had begun to reach a mainstream audience with hits including "Blowin' in the Wind" (1963) and "Masters of War" (1963), which brought "protest songs" to a wider public, but, although beginning to influence each other, rock and folk music had remained largely separate genres, often with mutually exclusive audiences.

Early attempts to combine elements of folk and rock included the Animals' "House of the Rising Sun" (1964), which was the first commercially successful folk song to be recorded with rock and roll instrumentation and the Beatles "I'm a Loser" (1964), arguably the first Beatles song to be influenced directly by Dylan. The folk rock movement is usually thought to have taken off with the Byrds' recording of Dylan's "Mr. Tambourine Man" which topped the charts in 1965. With members who had been part of the café-based folk scene in Los Angeles, the Byrds adopted rock instrumentation, including drums and 12-string Rickenbacker guitars, which became a major element in the sound of the genre. Later that year Dylan adopted electric instruments, much to the outrage of many folk purists, with his "Like a Rolling Stone" becoming a US hit single. According to Ritchie Unterberger, Dylan (even before his adoption of electric instruments) influenced rock musicians like the Beatles, demonstrating "to the rock generation in general that an album could be a major standalone statement without hit singles", such as on The Freewheelin' Bob Dylan (1963).

Folk rock particularly took off in California, where it led acts like the Mamas & the Papas and Crosby, Stills, and Nash to move to electric instrumentation, and in New York, where it spawned performers including the Lovin' Spoonful and Simon and Garfunkel, with the latter's acoustic "The Sounds of Silence" (1965) being remixed with rock instruments to be the first of many hits. These acts directly influenced British performers like Donovan and Fairport Convention. In 1969 Fairport Convention abandoned their mixture of American covers and Dylan-influenced songs to play traditional English folk music on electric instruments. This British folk-rock was taken up by bands including Pentangle, Steeleye Span and the Albion Band, which in turn prompted Irish groups like Horslips and Scottish acts like the JSD Band, Spencer's Feat and later Five Hand Reel, to use their traditional music to create a brand of Celtic rock in the early 1970s.

Folk-rock reached its peak of commercial popularity in the period 1967–68, before many acts moved off in a variety of directions, including Dylan and the Byrds, who began to develop country rock. However, the hybridization of folk and rock has been seen as having a major influence on the development of rock music, bringing in elements of psychedelia, and helping to develop the ideas of the singer-songwriter, the protest song, and concepts of "authenticity".

=== Psychedelic rock ===
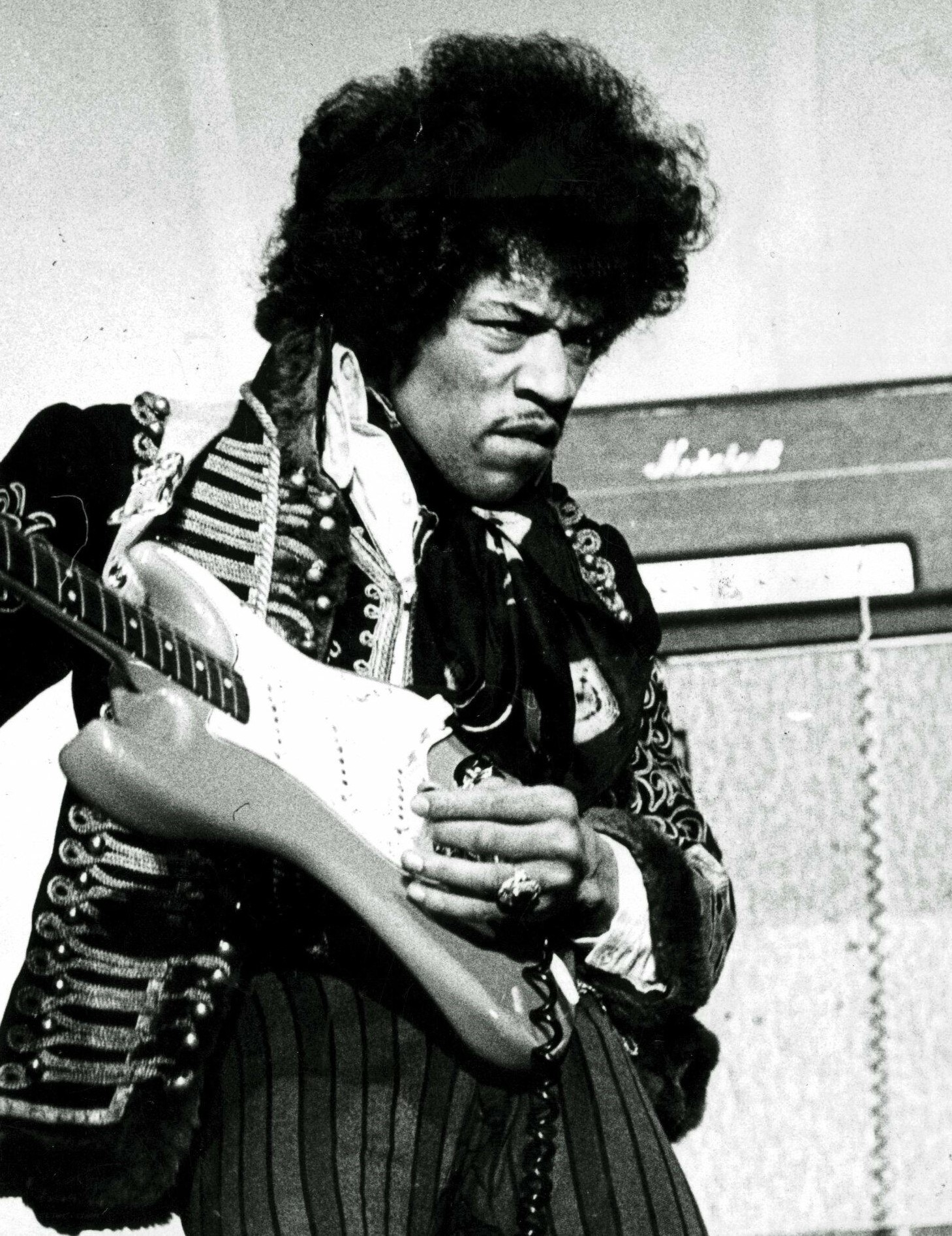
Jimi Hendrix performing in Sweden in 1967

Psychedelic music's LSD-inspired vibe began in the folk scene. The first group to advertise themselves as psychedelic rock were the 13th Floor Elevators from Texas. The Beatles introduced many of the major elements of the psychedelic sound to audiences in this period, such as guitar feedback, the Indian sitar and backmasking sound effects. Psychedelic rock particularly took off in California's emerging music scene as groups followed the Byrds' shift from folk to folk rock from 1965. The psychedelic lifestyle, which revolved around hallucinogenic drugs, had already developed in San Francisco and particularly prominent products of the scene were Big Brother and the Holding Company, the Grateful Dead and Jefferson Airplane. The Jimi Hendrix Experience's lead guitarist, Jimi Hendrix did extended distorted, feedback-filled jams which became a key feature of psychedelia. Psychedelic rock reached its apogee in the last years of the decade. 1967 saw the Beatles release their definitive psychedelic statement in Sgt. Pepper's Lonely Hearts Club Band, including the track "Lucy in the Sky with Diamonds"; the Rolling Stones responded later that year with Their Satanic Majesties Request, and Pink Floyd debuted with The Piper at the Gates of Dawn. Key recordings included Jefferson Airplane's Surrealistic Pillow and the Doors' self-titled debut album. These trends peaked in the 1969 Woodstock festival, which saw performances by most of the major psychedelic acts.

Sgt. Pepper was later regarded as a starting point for the album era, during which rock music transitioned from the singles format to albums and achieved cultural legitimacy in the mainstream. Led by the Beatles in the mid-1960s, rock musicians advanced the LP as the dominant form of recorded music expression and consumption, initiating a rock-informed album era in the music industry for the next several decades.

== 1970s–1980s: Further diversification ==
=== Commercial trends ===
Reflecting on developments that occurred in rock music in the early 1970s, Robert Christgau wrote in Christgau's Record Guide: Rock Albums of the Seventies (1981):

The decade is, of course, an arbitrary schema itself—time doesn't just execute a neat turn toward the future every ten years. But like a lot of artificial concepts—money, say—the category does take on a reality of its own once people figure out how to put it to work. "The '60s are over," a slogan one only began to hear in 1972 or so, mobilized all those eager to believe that idealism had become passe, and once they were mobilized, it had. In popular music, embracing the '70s meant both an elitist withdrawal from the messy concert and counterculture scene and a profiteering pursuit of the lowest common denominator in FM radio and album rock.

Rock saw greater commodification during this decade, turning into a multibillion-dollar industry and doubling its market while, as Christgau noted, suffering a significant "loss of cultural prestige". "Maybe the Bee Gees became more popular than the Beatles, but they were never more popular than Jesus", he said. "Insofar as the music retained any mythic power, the myth was self-referential – there were lots of songs about the rock and roll life but very few about how rock could change the world, except as a new brand of painkiller ... In the '70s the powerful took over, as rock industrialists capitalized on the national mood to reduce potent music to an often reactionary species of entertainment—and to transmute rock's popular base from the audience to market."

=== Progressive rock ===
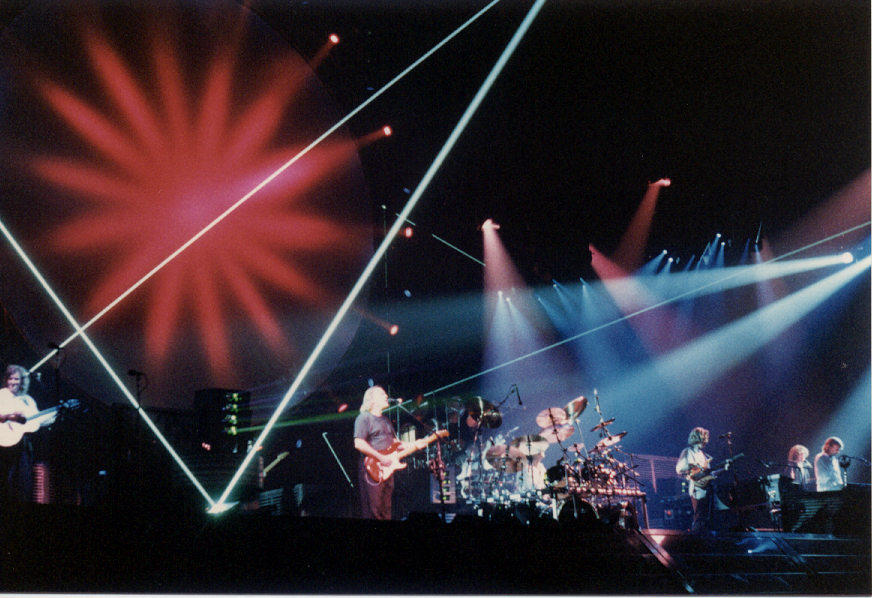
Pink Floyd performing at Docklands Arena, London, in 1989

Progressive rock, a term sometimes used interchangeably with art rock, moved beyond established musical formulas by experimenting with different instruments, song types, and forms. From the mid-1960s, the Left Banke, the Beatles, the Rolling Stones and the Beach Boys, had pioneered the inclusion of harpsichords, wind, and string sections on their recordings to produce a form of Baroque rock and can be heard in singles like Procol Harum's "A Whiter Shade of Pale" (1967), with its Bach-inspired introduction. The Moody Blues used a full orchestra on their album Days of Future Passed (1967) and subsequently created orchestral sounds with synthesizers. Classical orchestration, keyboards, and synthesizers were a frequent addition to the established rock format of guitars, bass, and drums in subsequent progressive rock.

Instrumentals were common, while songs with lyrics were sometimes conceptual, abstract, or based in fantasy and science fiction. The Pretty Things' SF Sorrow (1968), the Kinks' Arthur (Or the Decline and Fall of the British Empire) (1969), and the Who's Tommy (1969) introduced the format of rock operas and opened the door to concept albums, often telling an epic story or tackling a grand overarching theme. King Crimson's 1969 debut album, In the Court of the Crimson King, which mixed powerful guitar riffs and mellotron with jazz and symphonic music, is often taken as the key recording in progressive rock, helping the widespread adoption of the genre in the early 1970s among existing blues-rock and psychedelic bands, as well as newly formed acts. The vibrant Canterbury scene saw acts following Soft Machine from psychedelia, through jazz influences, toward more expansive hard rock, including Caravan, Hatfield and the North, Gong, and National Health. The French group Magma around drummer Christian Vander almost single-handedly created the new music genre zeuhl with their first albums in the early 1970s.

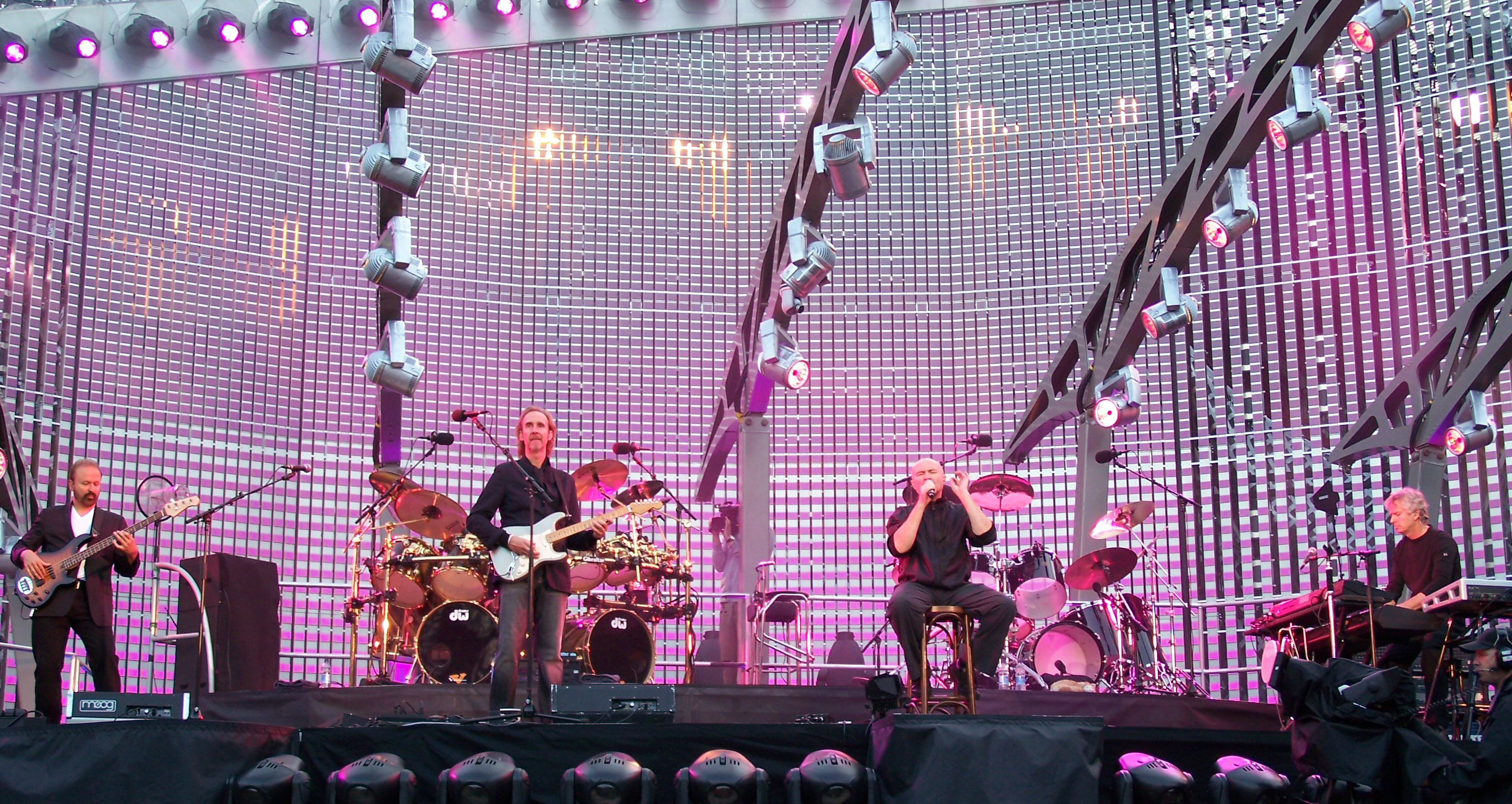
Genesis performing at Old Trafford, Manchester, in 2007

Pink Floyd also moved away from psychedelia after the departure of Syd Barrett in 1968, with The Dark Side of the Moon (1973) becoming one of the best-selling albums of all time. There was an emphasis on instrumental virtuosity, with Yes showcasing the skills of both guitarist Steve Howe and keyboard player Rick Wakeman, while Emerson, Lake & Palmer (ELP) were a supergroup who produced some of the genre's most technically demanding work. Jethro Tull and Genesis both pursued very different, but distinctly English, brands of music. Renaissance, formed in 1969 by ex-Yardbirds Jim McCarty and Keith Relf, evolved into a high-concept band featuring the three-octave voice of Annie Haslam. Most British bands depended on a relatively small cult following, but a handful, including Pink Floyd, Genesis, and Jethro Tull, managed to produce top ten singles at home and break the American market. The American brand of progressive rock varied from the eclectic and innovative Frank Zappa, Captain Beefheart and Blood, Sweat & Tears, to more pop rock orientated bands like Boston, Foreigner, Kansas, Journey, and Styx. These, beside British bands Supertramp and ELO, all demonstrated a prog rock influence and ranked among the most commercially successful acts of the 1970s, heralding the era of pomp or arena rock.

The instrumental strand of the genre resulted in albums like Mike Oldfield's Tubular Bells (1973), the first record for the Virgin Records label, which became a worldwide hit and a mainstay of the genre. Instrumental rock was particularly significant in continental Europe, allowing bands like Kraftwerk, Tangerine Dream, Can, Focus and Faust to circumvent the language barrier. Their synthesiser-heavy "krautrock", along with the work of Brian Eno (for a time the keyboard player with Roxy Music), would be a major influence on subsequent electronic rock.

With the advent of punk rock and technological changes in the late 1970s, progressive rock was increasingly dismissed as pretentious and overblown. Many bands broke up, but some, including Genesis, ELP, Yes, and Pink Floyd, regularly scored top ten albums with successful accompanying worldwide tours. Some bands which emerged in the aftermath of punk, such as Siouxsie and the Banshees, Ultravox, and Simple Minds, showed the influence of progressive rock, as well as their more usually recognized punk influences.

=== Jazz rock ===
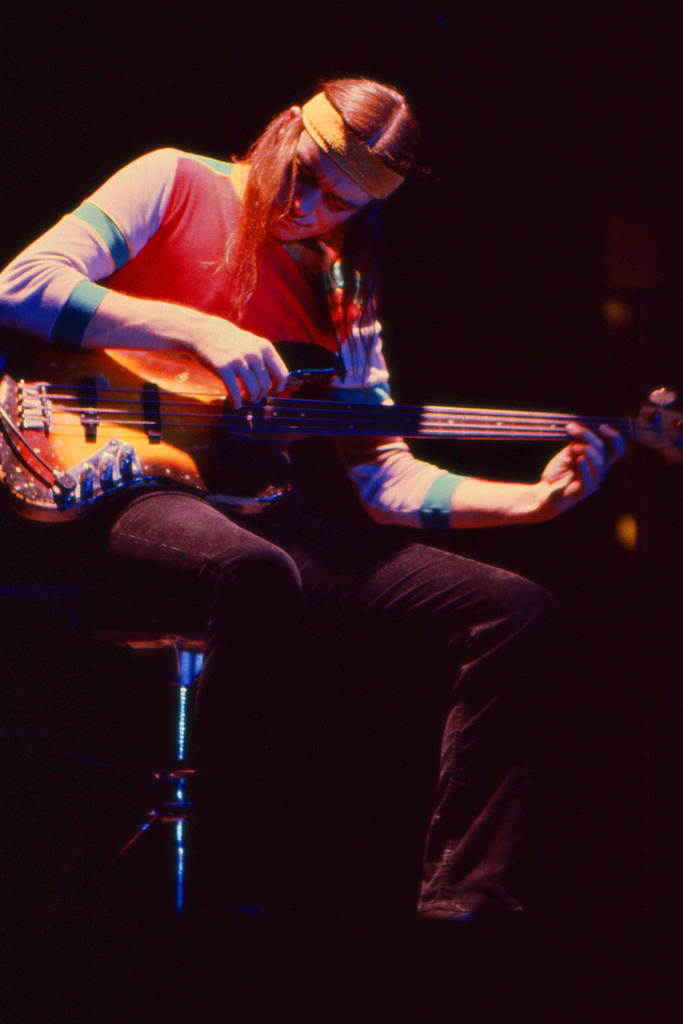
Jaco Pastorius of Weather Report in 1980

In the late 1960s, jazz-rock emerged as a distinct subgenre out of the blues-rock, psychedelic, and progressive rock scenes, mixing the power of rock with the musical complexity and improvisational elements of jazz. AllMusic states that the term jazz-rock "may refer to the loudest, wildest, most electrified fusion bands from the jazz camp, but most often it describes performers coming from the rock side of the equation." Jazz-rock "...generally grew out of the most artistically ambitious rock subgenres of the late '60s and early '70s", including the singer-songwriter movement. Many early US rock and roll musicians had begun in jazz and carried some of these elements into the new music. In Britain, the subgenre of blues rock, and many of its leading figures, like Ginger Baker and Jack Bruce of the band Cream, had emerged from the British jazz scene. Often highlighted as the first true jazz-rock recording is the only album by the relatively obscure New York–based the Free Spirits with Out of Sight and Sound (1966). The first group of bands to self-consciously use the label were R&B oriented white rock bands that made use of jazzy horn sections, like Electric Flag, Blood, Sweat & Tears and Chicago, to become some of the most commercially successful acts of the late 1960s and early 1970s.

British acts to emerge in the same period from the blues scene, to make use of the tonal and improvisational aspects of jazz, included Nucleus and the Graham Bond and John Mayall spin-off Colosseum. From the psychedelic rock and the Canterbury scenes came Soft Machine, who, it has been suggested, produced one of the artistically successfully fusions of the two genres. Perhaps the most critically praised fusion came from the jazz side of the equation, with Miles Davis, particularly influenced by the work of Hendrix, incorporating rock instrumentation into his sound for the album Bitches Brew (1970). It was a major influence on subsequent rock-influenced jazz artists, including Herbie Hancock, Chick Corea and Weather Report. The genre began to fade in the late 1970s, as a mellower form of fusion began to take its audience, but acts like Steely Dan, Frank Zappa and Joni Mitchell recorded significant jazz-influenced albums in this period, and it has continued to be a major influence on rock music.

=== Roots rock ===
Roots rock is the term now used to describe a move away from the psychedelic scene to a more basic form of rock and roll that incorporated its original influences, particularly blues, country and folk music, leading to the creation of country rock and Southern rock. In 1966, Bob Dylan went to Nashville to record the album Blonde on Blonde. This, and subsequent more clearly country-influenced albums, such as Nashville Skyline, have been seen as creating the genre of country folk, a route pursued by a number of largely acoustic folk musicians. Other acts that followed the back-to-basics trend were the Canadian group the Band and the California-based Creedence Clearwater Revival, both of which mixed basic rock and roll with folk, country and blues, to be among the most successful and influential bands of the late 1960s. The same movement saw the beginning of the recording careers of Californian solo artists like Ry Cooder, Bonnie Raitt and Lowell George, and influenced the work of established performers such as the Rolling Stones' Beggar's Banquet (1968) and the Beatles' Let It Be (1970). Reflecting on this change of trends in rock music over the past few years, Christgau wrote in his June 1970 "Consumer Guide" column that this "new orthodoxy" and "cultural lag" abandoned improvisatory, studio-ornamented productions in favor of an emphasis on "tight, spare instrumentation" and song composition: "Its referents are '50s rock, country music, and rhythm-and-blues, and its key inspiration is the Band."

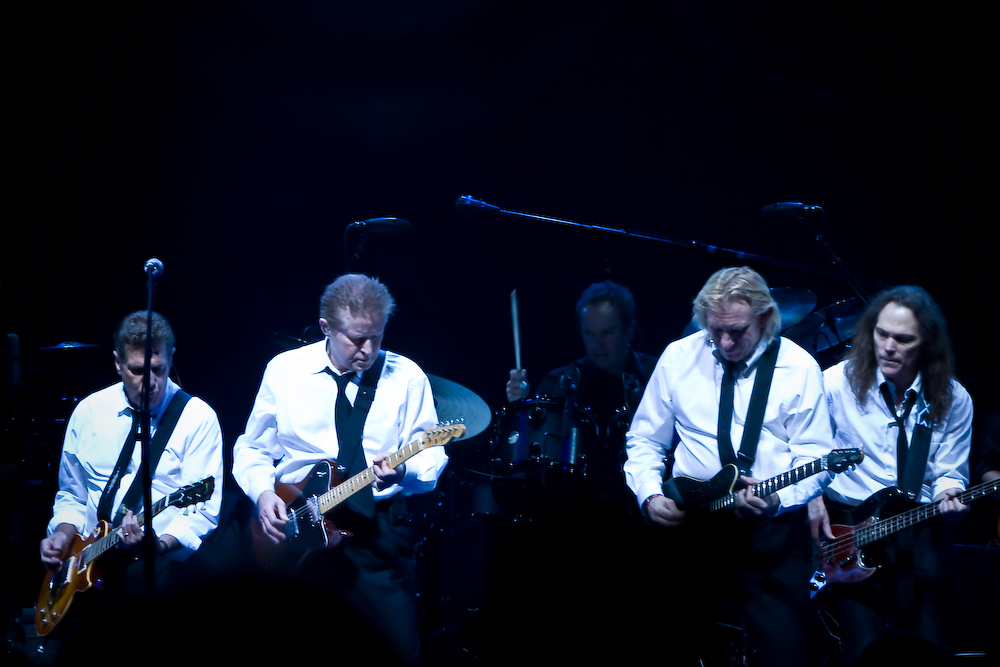
The Eagles during their 2008–2009 Long Road Out of Eden Tour

In 1968, Gram Parsons recorded Safe at Home with the International Submarine Band, arguably the first true country rock album. Later that year he joined the Byrds for Sweetheart of the Rodeo (1968), generally considered one of the most influential recordings in the genre. The Byrds continued in the same vein, but Parsons left to be joined by another ex-Byrds member Chris Hillman in forming the Flying Burrito Brothers who helped establish the respectability and parameters of the genre, before Parsons departed to pursue a solo career. Bands in California that adopted country rock included Hearts and Flowers, Poco, New Riders of the Purple Sage, the Beau Brummels, and the Nitty Gritty Dirt Band. Some performers also enjoyed a renaissance by adopting country sounds, including: the Everly Brothers; one-time teen idol Rick Nelson who became the frontman for the Stone Canyon Band; former Monkee Mike Nesmith who formed the First National Band; and Neil Young. The Dillards were, unusually, a country act, who moved towards rock music. The greatest commercial success for country rock came in the 1970s, with artists including the Doobie Brothers, Emmylou Harris, Linda Ronstadt and the Eagles (made up of members of the Burritos, Poco, and Stone Canyon Band), who emerged as one of the most successful rock acts of all time, producing albums that included Hotel California (1976).

The founders of Southern rock are usually thought to be the Allman Brothers Band, who developed a distinctive sound, largely derived from blues rock, but incorporating elements of boogie, soul, and country in the early 1970s. The most successful act to follow them were Lynyrd Skynyrd, who helped establish the "Good ol' boy" image of the subgenre and the general shape of 1970s' guitar rock. Their successors included the fusion/progressive instrumentalists Dixie Dregs, the more country-influenced Outlaws, funk/R&B-leaning Wet Willie and (incorporating elements of R&B and gospel) the Ozark Mountain Daredevils. After the loss of original members of the Allmans and Lynyrd Skynyrd, the genre began to fade in popularity in the late 1970s, but was sustained the 1980s with acts like .38 Special, Molly Hatchet and the Marshall Tucker Band.

=== Glam rock ===
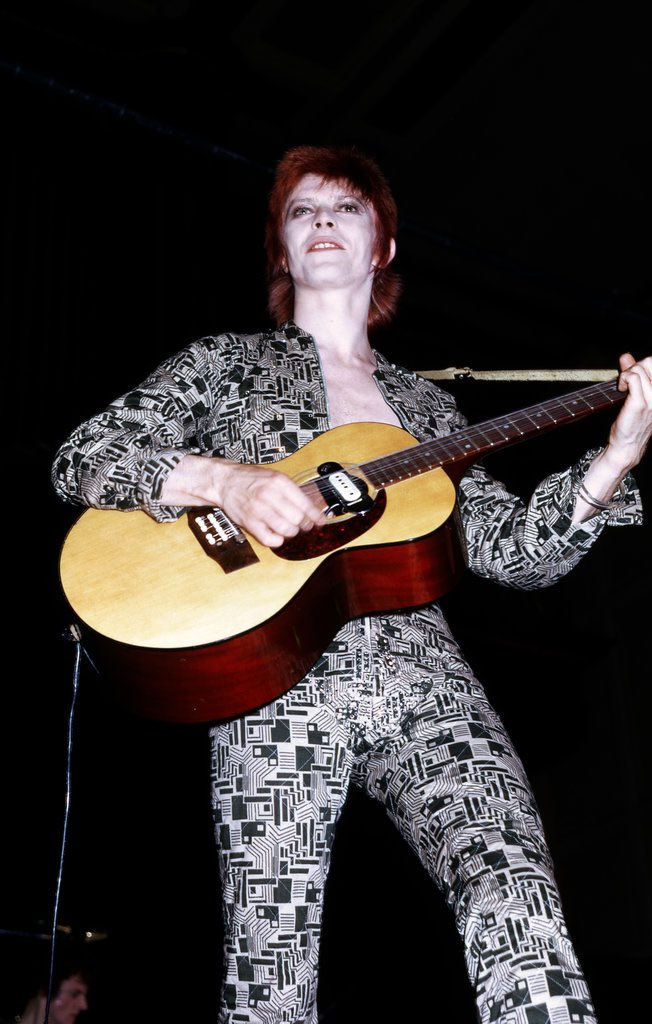
David Bowie during the Ziggy Stardust and the Spiders Tour in 1972

Glam rock emerged from the English psychedelic and art rock scenes of the late 1960s; it can be seen as both an extension of (and reaction against) those trends. Musically diverse, varying between the simple rock and roll revivalism of figures like Alvin Stardust to the complex art rock of Roxy Music, and can be seen as much as a fashion as a musical subgenre. Visually, it was a mesh of various styles, ranging from 1930s Hollywood glamor, through 1950s pin-up sex appeal, pre-war Cabaret theatrics, Victorian literary and symbolist styles, science fiction, to ancient and occult mysticism and mythology; manifesting itself in outrageous clothes, makeup, hairstyles, and platform-soled boots. Glam is most noted for its sexual and gender ambiguity and representations of androgyny, beside extensive use of theatrics. It was prefigured by the showmanship and gender-identity manipulation of American acts such as the Cockettes and Alice Cooper.

The origins of glam rock are associated with Marc Bolan, who had renamed his folk duo to T. Rex and taken up electric instruments by the end of the 1960s. Often cited as the moment of inception is his appearance on the BBC music show Top of the Pops in March 1971 wearing glitter and satins, to perform what would be his second UK Top 10 hit (and first UK Number 1 hit), "Hot Love". From 1971, already a minor star, David Bowie developed his Ziggy Stardust persona, incorporating elements of professional make up, mime and performance into his act. These performers were soon followed in the style by acts including Roxy Music, Sweet, Slade, Mott the Hoople, Mud and Alvin Stardust. While highly successful in the single charts in the United Kingdom, very few of these musicians were able to make a serious impact in the United States; Bowie was the major exception becoming an international superstar and prompting the adoption of glam styles among acts like Lou Reed, New York Dolls and Jobriath, often known as "glitter rock" and with a darker lyrical content than their British counterparts. In the UK the term glitter rock was most often used to refer to the extreme version of glam pursued by Gary Glitter and his support musicians the Glitter Band, who between them achieved eighteen top ten singles in the UK between 1972 and 1976. A second wave of glam rock acts, including Suzi Quatro, Roy Wood's Wizzard and Sparks, dominated the British single charts from about 1974 to 1976. Existing acts, some not usually considered central to the genre, also adopted glam styles, including Rod Stewart, Elton John, Queen and, for a time, even the Rolling Stones. It was also a direct influence on acts that rose to prominence later, including Kiss and Adam Ant, and less directly on the formation of gothic rock and glam metal as well as on punk rock, which helped end the fashion for glam from about 1976. Glam has since enjoyed sporadic modest revivals through bands such as the Darkness and in R&B crossover act Prince.

=== Chicano rock ===
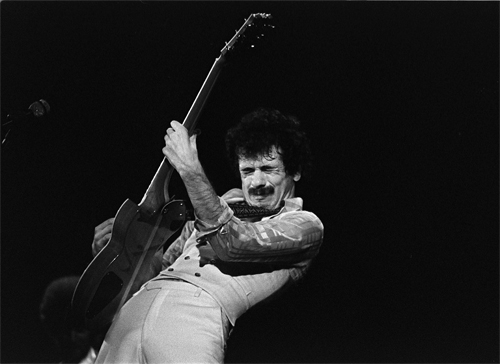
Carlos Santana performing in 1976 at the Cow Palace in San Francisco

After the early successes of Latin rock in the 1960s, Chicano musicians like Carlos Santana and Al Hurricane continued to have successful careers throughout the 1970s. Santana opened the decade with success in his 1970 single "Black Magic Woman" on the Abraxas album. From 1973 to 1978 he released a series of four albums that all achieved gold status: Welcome, Borboletta, Amigos, and Festivál. Al Hurricane continued to mix his rock music with New Mexico music, though he was also experimenting more heavily with jazz, which led to successful singles, especially on his Vestido Mojado album. Los Lobos gained popularity at this time, with their first album Los Lobos del Este de Los Angeles in 1977.

=== Soft rock, hard rock, and early heavy metal ===
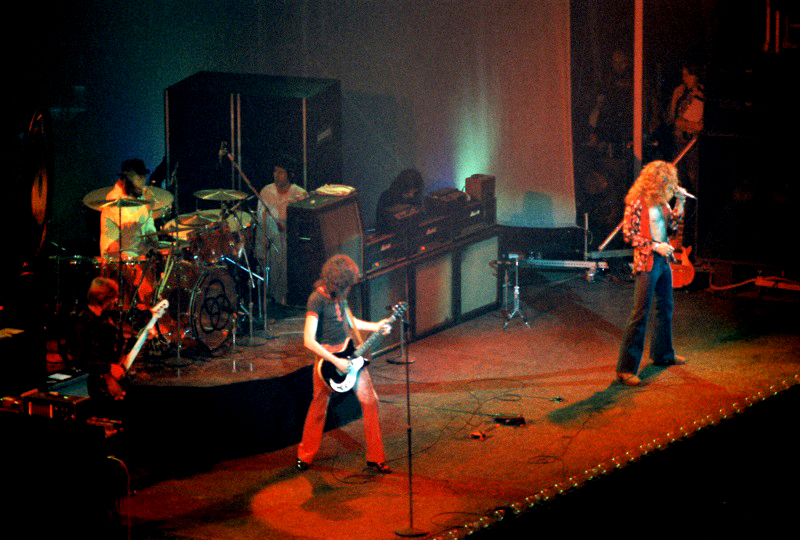
Led Zeppelin performing at Chicago Stadium in 1975

A strange time, 1971—although rock's balkanization into genres was well underway, it was often hard to tell one catch-phrase from the next. "Art-rock" could mean anything from the Velvets to the Moody Blues, and although Led Zeppelin was launched and Black Sabbath celebrated, "heavy metal" remained an amorphous concept.

— Rock music critic Robert Christgau

From the late 1960s, it became common to divide mainstream rock music into soft and hard rock. Soft rock was often derived from folk rock, using acoustic instruments and putting more emphasis on melody and harmonies. Major artists included Carole King, Cat Stevens and James Taylor. It reached its commercial peak in the mid- to late 1970s with acts like Billy Joel, America and the reformed Fleetwood Mac, whose Rumours (1977) was the best-selling album of the decade. In contrast, hard rock was more often derived from blues-rock and was played louder and with more intensity. It often emphasised the electric guitar, both as a rhythm instrument using simple repetitive riffs and as a solo lead instrument, and was more likely to be used with distortion and other effects. Key acts included British Invasion bands like the Kinks, as well as psychedelic era performers like Cream, Jimi Hendrix and the Jeff Beck Group. Hard rock-influenced bands that enjoyed international success in the late 1970s included Queen, Thin Lizzy, Aerosmith, AC/DC, and Van Halen.

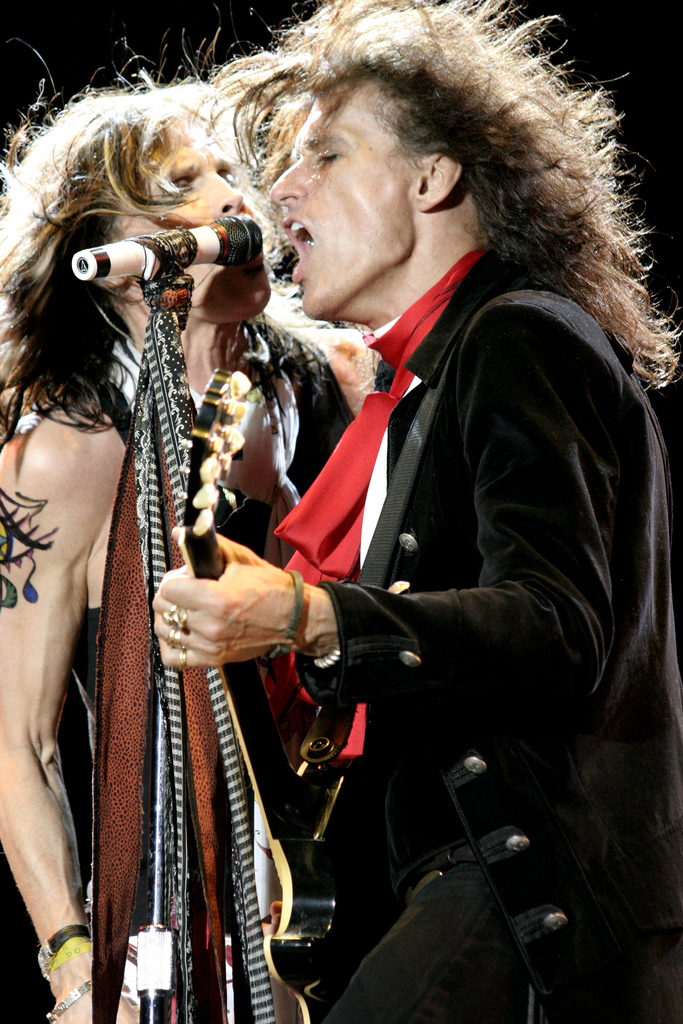
Steven Tyler and Joe Perry of Aerosmith performing in 2007

Also from the late 1960s, the term "heavy metal" began to be used to describe some hard rock played with even more volume and intensity, first as an adjective and by the early 1970s as a noun. The term was first used in music in Steppenwolf's "Born to Be Wild" (1967); the term began to be associated with bands like San Francisco's Blue Cheer, Cleveland's James Gang and Michigan's Grand Funk Railroad. By 1970, three key British bands had developed the characteristic sounds and styles which would help shape the subgenre. Led Zeppelin added elements of fantasy to their riff laden blues-rock, Deep Purple brought in symphonic and medieval interests from their progressive rock phase and Black Sabbath introduced facets of the gothic and modal harmony, helping to produce a "darker" sound. These elements were taken up by a "second generation" of hard rock and heavy metal bands into the late 1970s, including: Judas Priest, UFO, Motörhead and Rainbow from Britain; Kiss, Ted Nugent, and Blue Öyster Cult from the US; Rush from Canada, Golden Earring from the Netherlands and Scorpions from Germany, all marking the expansion in popularity of the subgenre. Despite a lack of airplay and very little presence on the singles charts, late 1970s heavy metal built a considerable following, particularly among adolescent working-class males in North America and Europe.

In the 1980s, bands such as Bon Jovi, Guns N' Roses, Metallica, Mötley Crüe and Def Leppard saw mainstream success, with hard rock and a fusion of hard rock and heavy metal with pop. During the 1990s, hard rock saw a slight decline in popularity, save for some major hits like Guns N' Roses' "November Rain", and Metallica's "Enter Sandman".

=== Christian rock ===
Switchfoot taking a bow at Buckhead Theatre, Atlanta, following a performance in 2014

Rock music has sometimes been criticized by some Christian leaders, who have condemned it as immoral, anti-Christian, and even satanic. However, Christian rock began to develop in the late 1960s, particularly out of the Jesus movement beginning in Southern California, and it emerged as a subgenre in the 1970s with artists like Larry Norman, usually seen as the first major "star" of Christian rock. The genre was mostly a phenomenon in the United States. Many Christian rock performers have ties to the contemporary Christian music scene. Starting in the 1980s, Christian pop performers, as well as hard rock bands like Stryper, have had some mainstream success. Starting in the 1990s, there were increasing numbers of acts who attempted to avoid the Christian band label, preferring to be seen as groups who were also Christians, including P.O.D.

=== Heartland rock ===
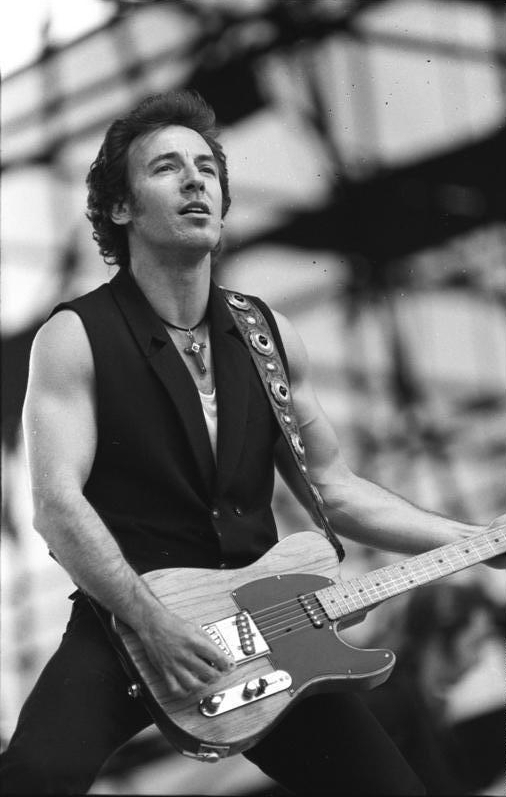
Bruce Springsteen performing in East Berlin in 1988

American working-class oriented heartland rock, characterized by a straightforward musical style and a concern with the lives of ordinary, blue-collar American people, developed in the second half of the 1970s. The term heartland rock was first used to describe Midwestern arena rock groups like Kansas, REO Speedwagon and Styx, but which came to be associated with a more socially concerned form of roots rock more directly influenced by folk, country and rock and roll. It has been seen as an American Midwest and Rust Belt counterpart to West Coast country rock and the Southern rock of the American South. Led by figures who had initially been identified with punk and new wave, it was most strongly influenced by acts such as Bob Dylan, the Byrds, Creedence Clearwater Revival and Van Morrison, and the basic rock of 1960s garage and the Rolling Stones.

Exemplified by the commercial success of singer songwriters Bruce Springsteen, Bob Seger, and Tom Petty, it was partly a reaction to post-industrial urban decline in the East and Mid-West, often dwelling on issues of social disintegration and isolation, beside a form of good-time rock and roll revivalism. The genre reached its commercial peak in the mid-1980s, with Springsteen's Born in the USA (1984) topping the charts worldwide and spawning a series of top ten singles, together with the arrival of artists including John Mellencamp, Steve Earle and more gentle singer-songwriters such as Bruce Hornsby.

Heartland rock faded away as a recognized genre by the early 1990s, as rock music in general, and blue-collar and white working class themes in particular, lost influence with younger audiences, and as heartland's artists turned to more personal works.

=== Punk rock ===
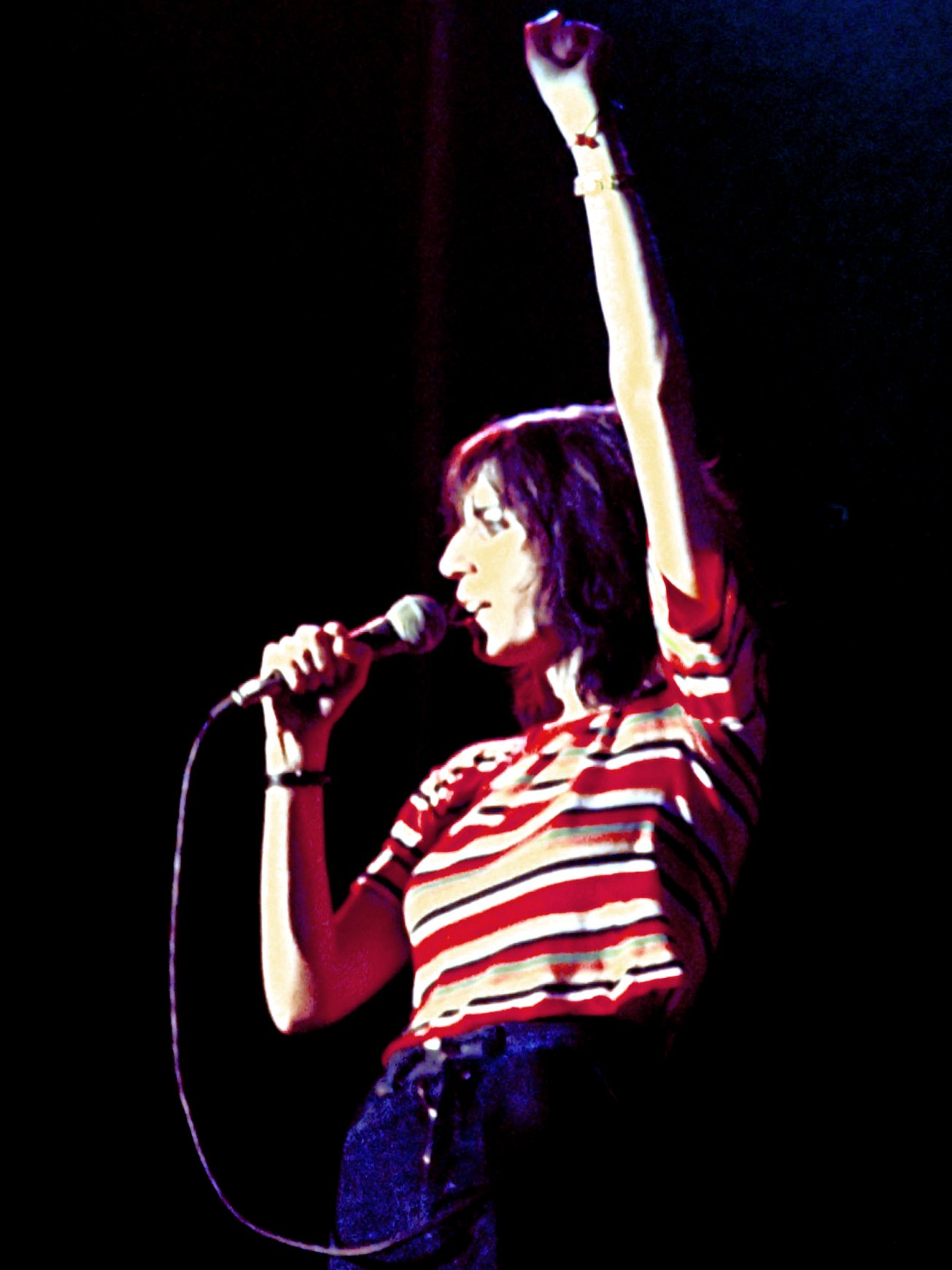
Patti Smith performing in Copenhagen in October 1976

Punk rock was developed between 1974 and 1976 in the United States and the United Kingdom. Rooted in garage rock and other forms of what is now known as protopunk music, punk rock bands eschewed the perceived excesses of mainstream 1970s rock. They created fast, hard-edged music, typically with short songs, stripped-down instrumentation, and often political, anti-establishment lyrics. Punk embraces a DIY (do it yourself) ethic, with many bands self-producing their recordings and distributing them through informal channels.

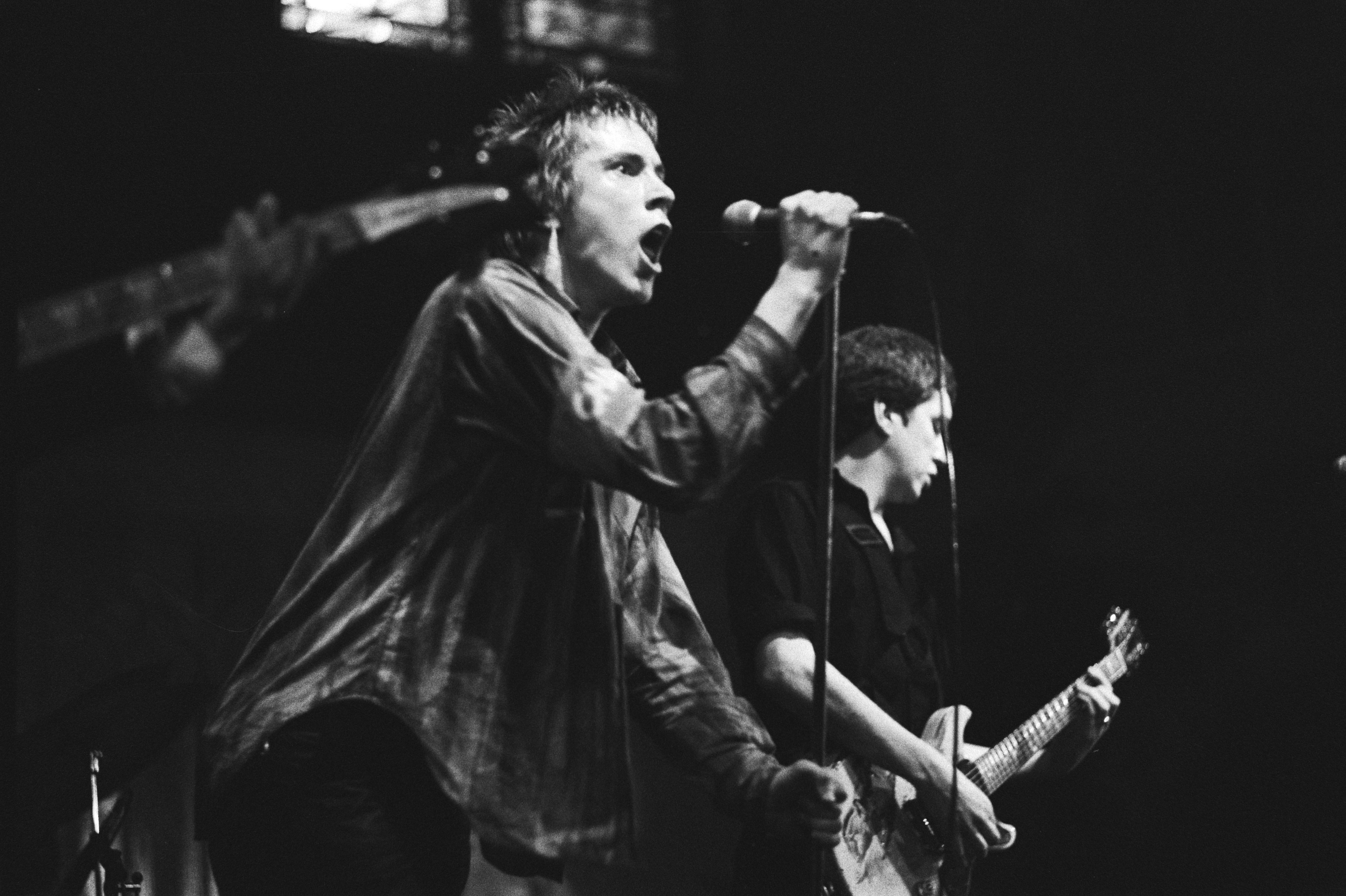
Vocalist Johnny Rotten and guitarist Steve Jones of the Sex Pistols performing in Amsterdam in January 1977

By late 1976, acts such as the Ramones and Patti Smith, in New York City, and the Sex Pistols and the Clash, in London, were recognized as the vanguard of a new musical movement. The following year saw punk rock spreading around the world. Punk quickly became a major cultural phenomenon in the UK. The Sex Pistols' live TV skirmish with Bill Grundy on 1 December 1976 was the watershed moment in British punk's transformation into a major media phenomenon, even as some stores refused to stock the records and radio airplay was hard to come by. In May 1977, the Sex Pistols achieved new heights of controversy (and number two on the singles chart) with the song "God Save the Queen", which referenced Queen Elizabeth II during her Silver Jubilee. For the most part, punk took root in local scenes that tended to reject association with the mainstream. An associated punk subculture emerged, expressing youthful rebellion and characterized by distinctive clothing styles and a variety of ideologies.

By the beginning of the 1980s, faster, more aggressive styles such as hardcore and Oi! had emerged, which evolved into strains of hardcore punk such as D-beat (a distortion-heavy subgenre influenced by the UK band Discharge), anarcho-punk (e.g. Crass), grindcore (e.g. Napalm Death), and crust punk. Musicians identifying with or inspired by punk also pursued a broad range of other variations, giving rise to new wave, post-punk and the alternative rock movement.

=== New wave ===
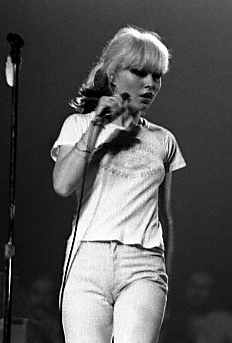
Debbie Harry, lead singer of Blondie, performing at Maple Leaf Gardens in Toronto in October 1977

Although punk rock was a significant social and musical phenomenon, it achieved less in the way of record sales (being distributed by small specialty labels such as Stiff Records), or American radio airplay (as the radio scene continued to be dominated by mainstream formats such as disco and album-oriented rock). Punk rock had attracted devotees from the art and collegiate world and soon bands sporting a more literate, arty approach, such as Talking Heads and Devo, began to infiltrate the punk scene; in some quarters the description "new wave" began to be used to differentiate these less overtly punk bands. Record executives, who had been mostly mystified by the punk movement, recognized the potential of the more accessible new wave acts and began aggressively signing and marketing any band that could claim a remote connection to punk or new wave. Many of these bands, such as the Cars and the Go-Go's, can be seen as pop bands marketed as new wave; other existing acts, including the Police, the Pretenders and Elvis Costello, used the new wave movement as the springboard for relatively long and critically successful careers, while "skinny tie" bands like the Knack played chart-topping power pop, and the photogenic Blondie began as a punk act and moved into lighter and more eclectic territories.

Between 1979 and 1985, influenced by Kraftwerk, Yellow Magic Orchestra, David Bowie and Gary Numan, British new wave went in the direction of such New Romantics as Spandau Ballet, Ultravox, Japan, Duran Duran, A Flock of Seagulls, Culture Club, Talk Talk and the Eurythmics, sometimes using the synthesizer to replace all other instruments. This period coincided with the rise of MTV and led to a great deal of exposure for this brand of synth-pop, creating what has been characterised as a second British Invasion. Some more traditional rock bands were also successful, such as Dire Straits, whose "Money for Nothing" gently poked fun at MTV, and Golden Earring, a band that had scored a massive hit in the 1970s with "Radar Love", scored another hit in the following decade with "Twilight Zone", but in general guitar-oriented rock was commercially eclipsed.

=== Post-punk ===
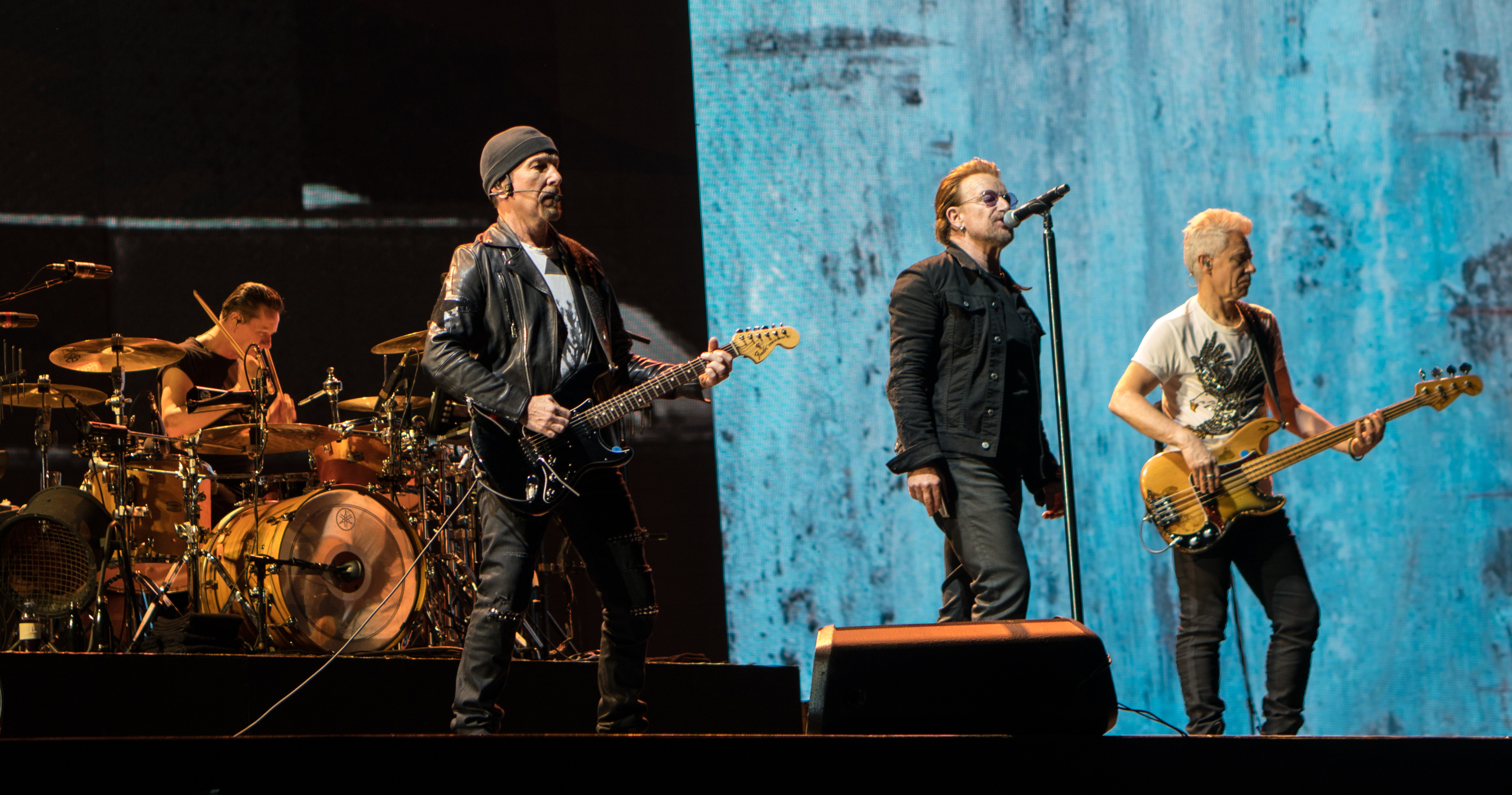
U2 performing on The Joshua Tree Tour in Brussels in 2017

If hardcore most directly pursued the stripped down aesthetic of punk, and new wave came to represent its commercial wing, post-punk emerged in the late 1970s and early 1980s as its more artistic and challenging side. In addition to punk bands, major influences included the Velvet Underground, the Stooges and Captain Beefheart. Early contributors to the genre included U.S. bands Pere Ubu, Devo, the Residents, and Talking Heads.

The first wave of British post-punk included Gang of Four, Siouxsie and the Banshees and Joy Division, who placed less emphasis on art than their US counterparts and more on the dark emotional qualities of their music. Bands like Siouxsie and the Banshees, Bauhaus, the Cure, and the Sisters of Mercy, moved increasingly in this direction to found gothic rock, which had become the basis of a major sub-culture by the early 1980s. Similar emotional territory was pursued by Australian acts like the Birthday Party and Nick Cave. Members of Bauhaus and Joy Division explored new stylistic territory as Love and Rockets and New Order respectively. Another early post-punk movement was the industrial music developed by British bands Throbbing Gristle and Cabaret Voltaire, and New York-based Suicide, using a variety of electronic and sampling techniques that emulated the sound of industrial production and which would develop into a variety of forms of post-industrial music in the 1980s.

The second generation of British post-punk bands that broke through in the early 1980s, including the Fall, the Pop Group, the Mekons, Echo and the Bunnymen and the Teardrop Explodes, tended to move away from dark sonic landscapes. Arguably the most successful band to emerge from post-punk was Ireland's U2, who incorporated elements of religious imagery together with political commentary into their often anthemic music, and by the late 1980s had become one of the biggest bands in the world. Although many post-punk bands continued to record and perform, it declined as a movement in the mid-1980s as acts disbanded or moved off to explore other musical areas, but it has continued to influence the development of rock music and has been seen as a major element in the creation of the alternative rock movement.

=== Emergence of alternative rock ===
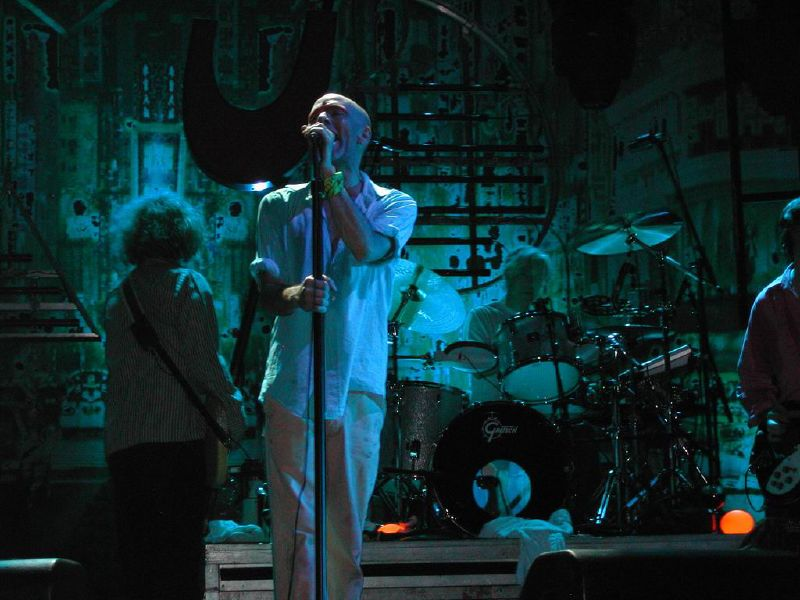
R.E.M., a successful alternative rock band in the 1980s and 1990s, performing in 2003

The term alternative rock was coined in the early 1980s to describe rock artists who did not fit into the mainstream genres of the time. Bands dubbed "alternative" had no unified style, but were all seen as distinct from mainstream music. Alternative bands were linked by their collective debt to punk rock, through new wave, post-punk or hardcore. Important alternative rock bands of the 1980s in the US included R.E.M., Hüsker Dü, Jane's Addiction, Sonic Youth, and the Pixies; in the UK, popular bands the Cure, New Order, the Jesus and Mary Chain, and the Smiths. Artists were largely confined to independent record labels, building an extensive underground music scene based on college radio, fanzines, touring, and word-of-mouth. They rejected the dominant synth-pop of the early 1980s, marking a return to group-based guitar rock.

Few of these early bands achieved mainstream success, although exceptions to this rule include R.E.M., the Smiths, and the Cure. Despite a general lack of spectacular album sales, the original alternative rock bands exerted a considerable influence on the generation of musicians who came of age in the 1980s and ended up breaking through to mainstream success in the 1990s. Styles of alternative rock in the US during the 1980s included jangle pop, associated with the early recordings of R.E.M., which incorporated the ringing guitars of mid-1960s pop and rock, and college rock, used to describe alternative bands that began in the college circuit and college radio, including acts such as 10,000 Maniacs and the Feelies. In the UK, by the end of the 1980s, indie or dream pop bands like Primal Scream and the Wedding Present, and what were dubbed shoegaze bands like My Bloody Valentine, Slowdive, and Ride entered. Particularly vibrant was the Madchester scene, producing such bands as Happy Mondays and the Stone Roses. The next decade would see the success of grunge in the US and Britpop in the UK, bringing alternative rock into the mainstream.

== 1990s–2000s: Alternative goes mainstream ==
=== Grunge ===
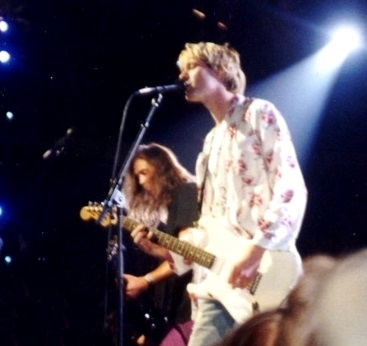
Grunge band Nirvana performing in 1992

In the latter half of the 1980s, bands in Washington state (particularly in the Seattle area) formed a new style of rock that contrasted with the mainstream music of the time. The developing genre came to be known as "grunge", a term descriptive of the dirty sound of the music and the unkempt appearance of most musicians, who rebelled against the over-groomed images of other artists. Grunge made heavy use of guitar distortion, fuzz, and feedback. The lyrics were typically apathetic and angst-filled, and often concerned themes such as social alienation and entrapment, although it was also known for its dark humor and parodies of commercial rock.

Bands such as Green River, Soundgarden, and Melvins pioneered the genre, with Mudhoney becoming the most successful by the end of the decade. Grunge remained largely a local phenomenon until 1991, when Nirvana's album Nevermind became a huge success, containing the anthemic song "Smells Like Teen Spirit". Nevermind was more melodic than its predecessors; by signing to Geffen Records the band was one of the first to employ traditional corporate promotion and marketing mechanisms such as an MTV video, in store displays and the use of radio "consultants" who promoted airplay at major mainstream rock stations. During 1991 and 1992, other grunge albums such as Pearl Jam's Ten, Soundgarden's Badmotorfinger, and Alice in Chains' Dirt, along with the Temple of the Dog album featuring members of Pearl Jam and Soundgarden, became among the 100 top-selling albums. Major record labels signed most of the remaining grunge bands in Seattle, while a second influx of acts moved to the city in the hope of success. However, after the death of Kurt Cobain and the subsequent break-up of Nirvana in 1994, the genre began to decline, partly to be overshadowed by Britpop and more commercial sounding post-grunge.

=== Britpop ===
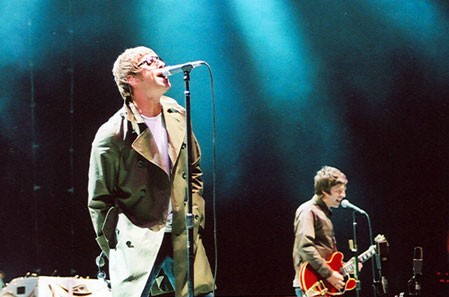
Oasis performing in San Diego in 2005

Britpop emerged from the British alternative rock scene of the early 1990s and was characterised by bands particularly influenced by British guitar music of the 1960s and 1970s. The Smiths were a major influence, as were bands of the Madchester scene, which had dissolved in the early 1990s. Britpop was varied in style, but often used catchy tunes and hooks, beside lyrics with particularly British concerns and the adoption of the iconography of the 1960s British invasion, including the symbols of British identity previously used by the mods. It was launched around 1993 with releases by groups such as Suede and Blur, who were soon joined by others including Oasis, Pulp, Supergrass, and Elastica, who produced a series of successful albums and singles. For a while the contest between Blur and Oasis was built by the popular press into the "Battle of Britpop", initially won by Blur, but with Oasis achieving greater long-term and international success, directly influencing later Britpop bands, such as Ocean Colour Scene and Kula Shaker. Britpop groups brought British alternative rock into the mainstream and formed the backbone of a larger British cultural trend known as Cool Britannia. The movement had largely fallen apart by the end of the decade.

=== Post-grunge ===
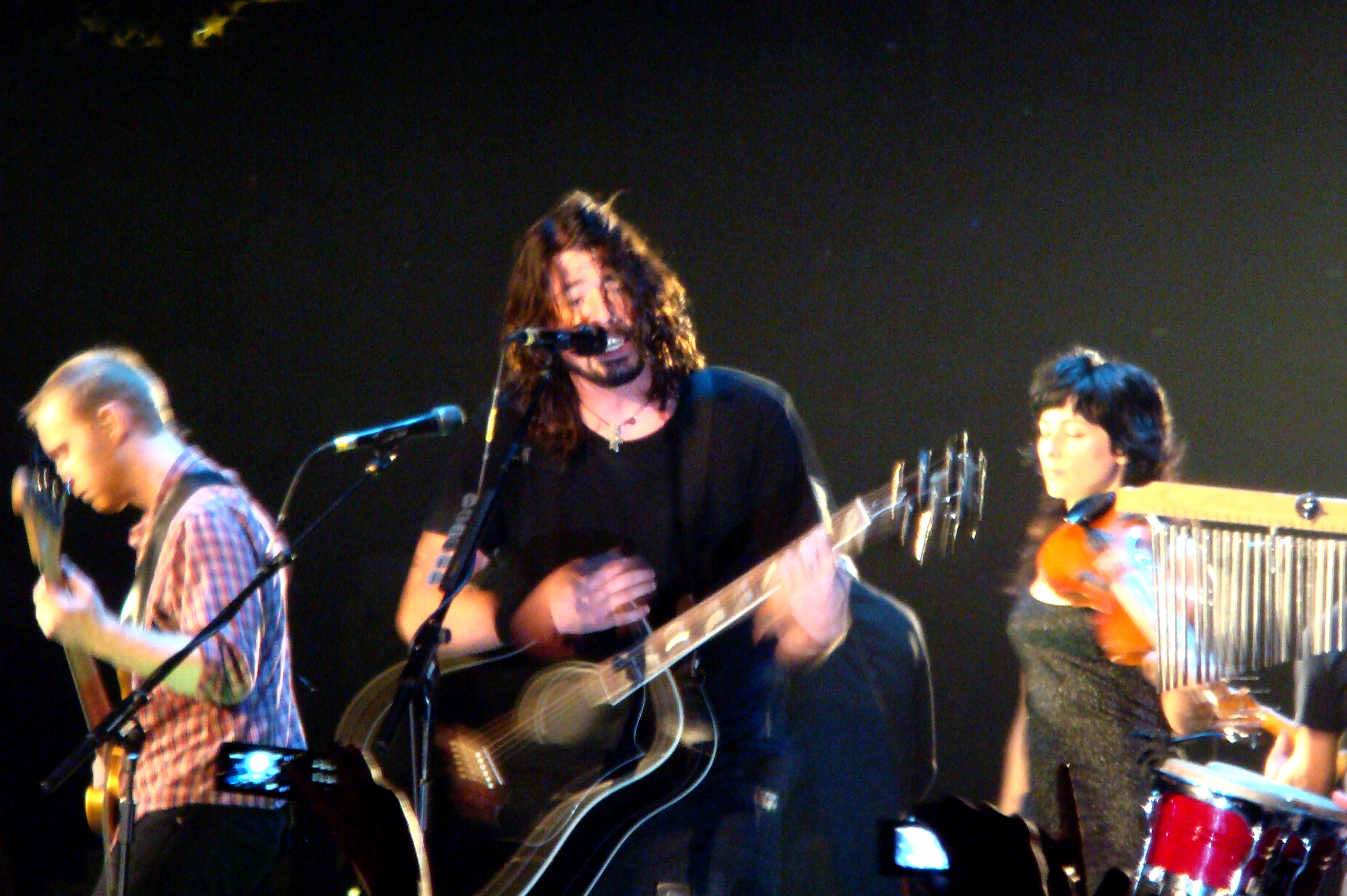
Foo Fighters performing an acoustic show in 2007

The term post-grunge was coined for the bands that followed the emergence into the mainstream of the Seattle grunge bands and emulated their music, but with a more radio-friendly commercially oriented sound. Often they worked through the major labels and incorporated influences from hard rock, pop rock, or alternative metal. The term post-grunge originally was meant to be pejorative, suggesting that grunge bands that emerged when grunge was mainstream were simply musically derivative, or a cynical response to an "authentic" rock movement. From 1995, former Nirvana drummer Dave Grohl's new band, the Foo Fighters, helped popularize the post-grunge genre.

Some post-grunge bands, like Candlebox, were from Seattle, but the subgenre was marked by a broadening of the geographical base of grunge, with bands like York, Pennsylvania's Live and Georgia's Collective Soul, and beyond the US to Australia's Silverchair and Britain's Bush, who all cemented post-grunge as one of the most commercially viable subgenres of the mid-1990s. Bands like Creed and Nickelback took post-grunge into the late 1990s and 2000s with considerable commercial success, abandoning most of the angst and anger of the original movement for more conventional anthems, narratives and romantic songs, and were followed in this vein by newer acts including Shinedown, Seether, 3 Doors Down and Puddle of Mudd.

=== Pop-punk ===
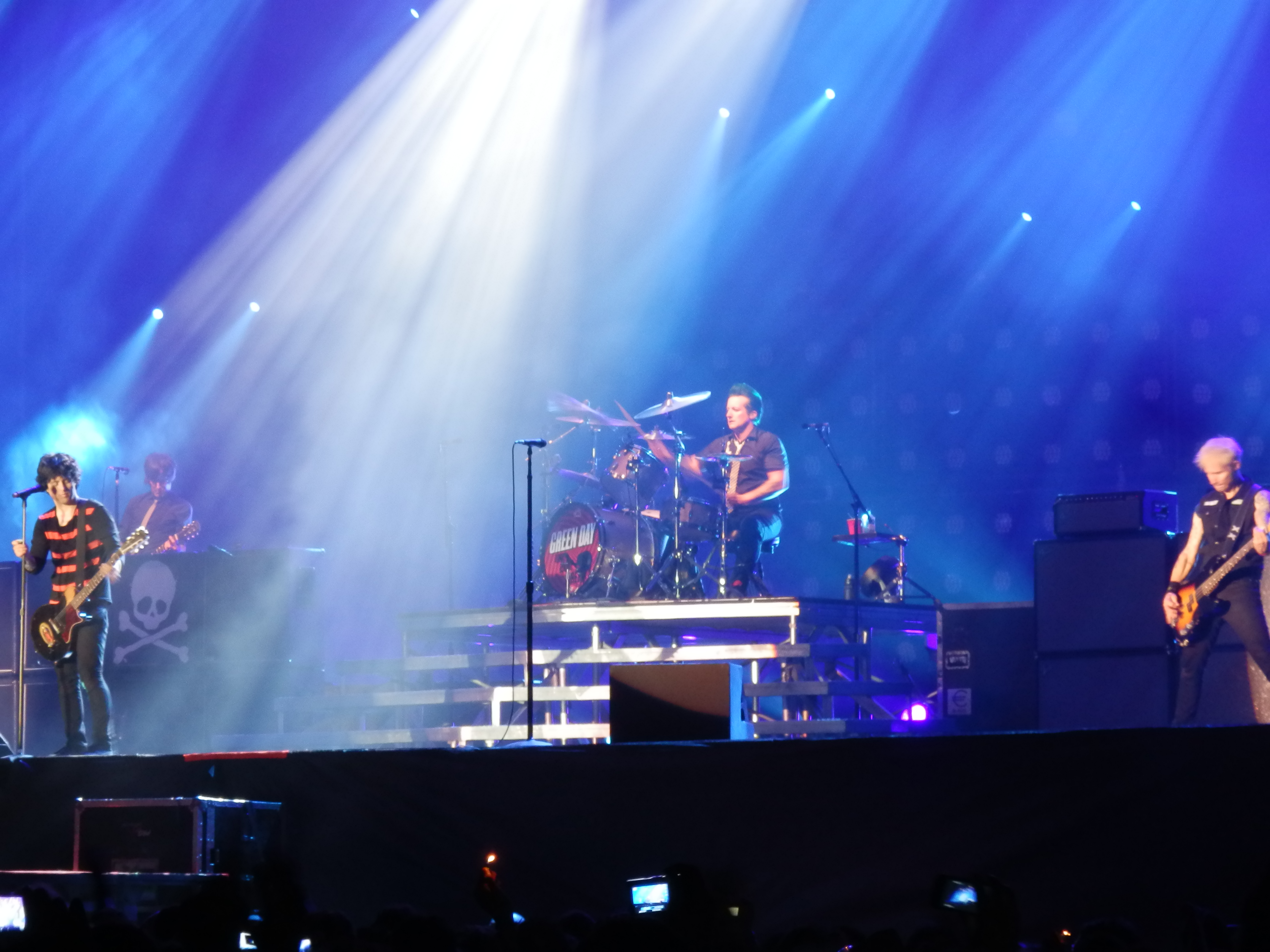
Green Day performing in Rome in 2013

The origins of 1990s pop-punk can be seen in the more song-oriented bands of the 1970s punk movement like Buzzcocks and the Clash, commercially successful new wave acts such as the Jam and the Undertones, and the more hardcore-influenced elements of alternative rock in the 1980s. Pop-punk tends to use power-pop melodies and chord changes with speedy punk tempos and loud guitars. Punk music provided the inspiration for some California-based bands on independent labels in the early 1990s, including Rancid and Green Day. In 1994, Green Day moved to a major label and produced the album Dookie, which found a new, largely teenage, audience and proved a surprise diamond-selling success, leading to a series of hit singles, including two number ones in the US. They were soon followed by the eponymous debut from Weezer, which spawned three top ten singles in the US. This success opened the door for the multi-platinum sales of metallic punk band the Offspring with Smash (1994). This first wave of pop punk reached its commercial peak with Green Day's Nimrod (1997) and the Offspring's Americana (1998).

A second wave of pop-punk was spearheaded by Blink-182, with their breakthrough album Enema of the State (1999), followed by bands such as Good Charlotte, Simple Plan and Sum 41, who made use of humour in their videos and had a more radio-friendly tone to their music, while retaining the speed, some of the attitude and even the look of 1970s punk. Later pop-punk bands, including All Time Low, the All-American Rejects and Fall Out Boy, had a sound that has been described as closer to 1980s hardcore, while still achieving commercial success.

=== Indie rock ===
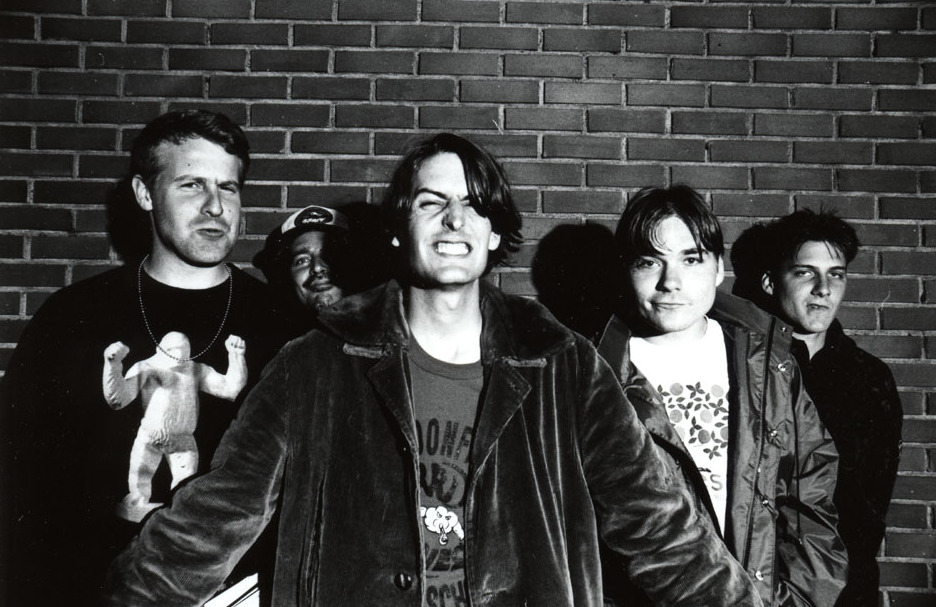
Lo-fi indie rock band Pavement

In the 1980s the terms indie rock and alternative rock were used interchangeably. By the mid-1990s, as elements of the movement began to attract mainstream interest, particularly grunge and then Britpop, post-grunge and pop-punk, the term alternative began to lose its meaning. Those bands following the less commercial contours of the scene were increasingly referred to by the label indie. Linked by an ethos more than a musical approach, the indie rock movement encompassed a wide range of styles, from hard-edged, grunge-influenced bands like the Cranberries and Superchunk, through do-it-yourself experimental bands like Pavement, to punk-folk singers such as Ani DiFranco. It has been noted that indie rock has a relatively high proportion of female artists compared with preceding rock genres, a tendency exemplified by the development of feminist-informed Riot grrrl music. Many countries have developed an extensive local indie scene, flourishing with bands with enough popularity to survive inside the respective country, but virtually unknown outside them.

By the end of the 1990s many recognisable subgenres, most with their origins in the late 1980s alternative movement, were included under the umbrella of indie. Lo-fi eschewed polished recording techniques for a D.I.Y. ethos and was spearheaded by Beck, Sebadoh and Pavement. The work of Talk Talk and Slint helped inspire both post rock, an experimental style influenced by jazz and electronic music (exemplified by acts such as Bark Psychosis, Tortoise, Stereolab, and Laika), as well as leading to more dense and complex, guitar-based math rock, developed by acts like Polvo and Chavez. Space rock looked back to progressive roots, with drone heavy and minimalist acts like Spacemen 3, the two bands created out of its split, Spectrum and Spiritualized, and later groups including Flying Saucer Attack, Godspeed You! Black Emperor and Quickspace. In contrast, sadcore emphasised pain and suffering through melodic use of acoustic and electronic instrumentation in the music of bands like American Music Club and Red House Painters, while the revival of baroque pop reacted against lo-fi and experimental music by placing an emphasis on melody and classical instrumentation, with artists like Arcade Fire, Belle and Sebastian and Rufus Wainwright.

=== Alternative metal, funk rock, funk metal, nu metal, rap rock and rap metal ===
Alternative metal emerged from the hardcore scene of alternative rock in the US in the later 1980s, but gained a wider audience after grunge broke into the mainstream in the early 1990s. Early alternative metal bands mixed a wide variety of genres with hardcore and heavy metal sensibilities, with acts like Jane's Addiction and Primus using progressive rock, Soundgarden and Corrosion of Conformity using garage punk, the Jesus Lizard and Helmet mixing noise rock, Ministry and Nine Inch Nails influenced by industrial music, Monster Magnet moving into psychedelia, Pantera, Sepultura and White Zombie creating groove metal, while Biohazard, Limp Bizkit and Faith No More turned to hip-hop and rap.

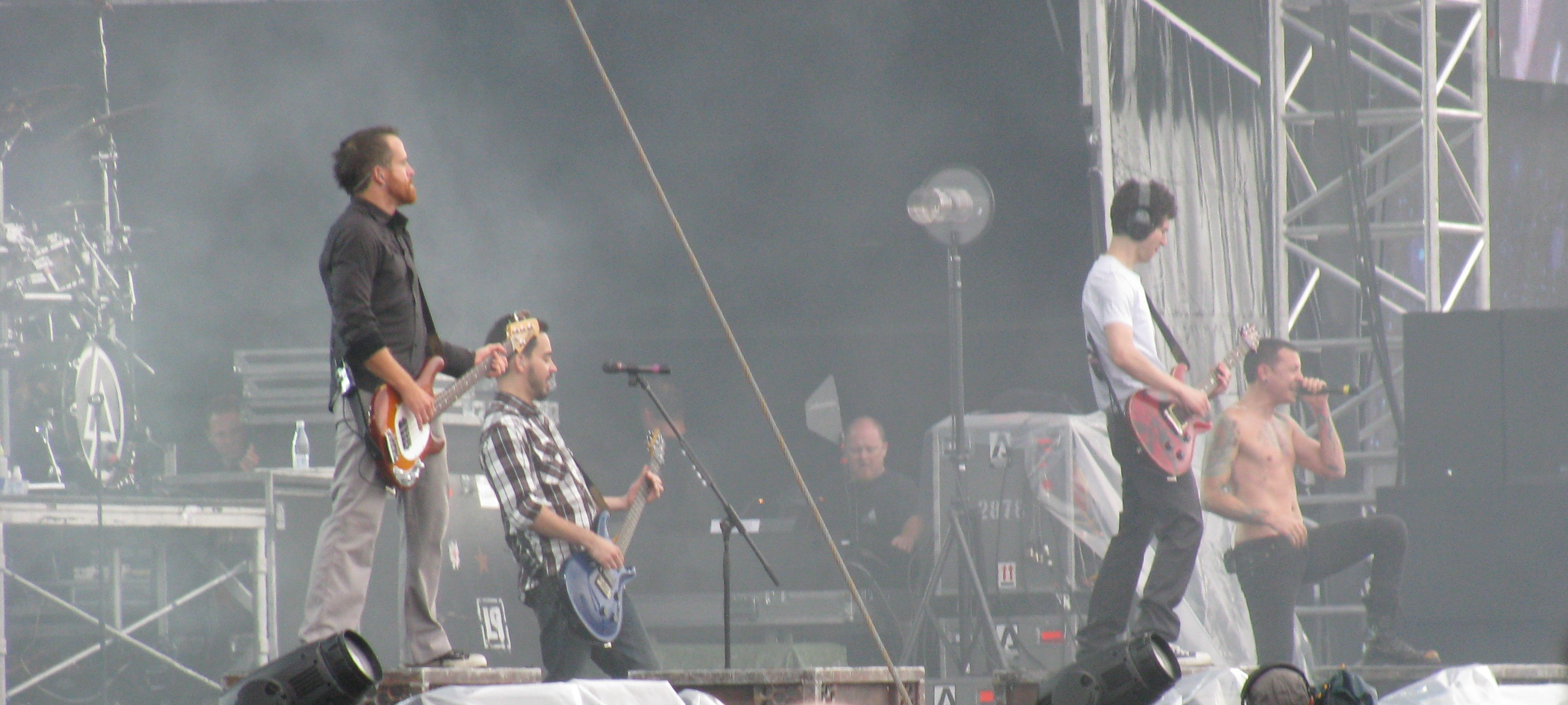
Linkin Park performing at Sonisphere Festival in Pori, Finland, in 2009

Hip-hop had gained attention from rock acts in the early 1980s, including the Clash with "The Magnificent Seven" (1980) and Blondie with "Rapture" (1980). Early crossover acts included Run DMC and the Beastie Boys. Rappers who sampled rock songs included Ice-T, the Fat Boys, LL Cool J, Public Enemy and Whodini. The mixing of thrash metal and rap was pioneered by Anthrax on their 1987 comedy-influenced single "I'm the Man".

In 1990, Faith No More broke into the mainstream with their single "Epic", often seen as the first truly successful combination of heavy metal with rap. This paved the way for the success of existing bands like 24-7 Spyz and Living Colour, and new acts including Rage Against the Machine and Red Hot Chili Peppers, who all fused rock and hip-hop among other influences. Among the first wave of performers to gain mainstream success as rap rock were 311, Bloodhound Gang, and Kid Rock. A more metallic sound – nu metal – was pursued by bands including Limp Bizkit, Korn and Slipknot. Later in the decade this style, which contained a mix of grunge, punk, metal, rap and turntable scratching, spawned a wave of successful bands like Linkin Park, P.O.D. and Staind, who were often classified as rap metal or nu metal, the first of which are the best-selling band of the genre.

In 2001, nu metal reached its peak with albums like Staind's Break the Cycle, P.O.D's Satellite, Slipknot's Iowa and Linkin Park's Hybrid Theory. New bands also emerged like Disturbed, Godsmack and Papa Roach, whose major label debut Infest became a platinum hit. By 2002, nu metal bands were played more infrequently on rock radio stations and MTV began focusing on pop-punk and emo. Since then, many bands have changed to a more conventional hard rock, heavy metal, or electronic music sound.

=== Post-Britpop ===
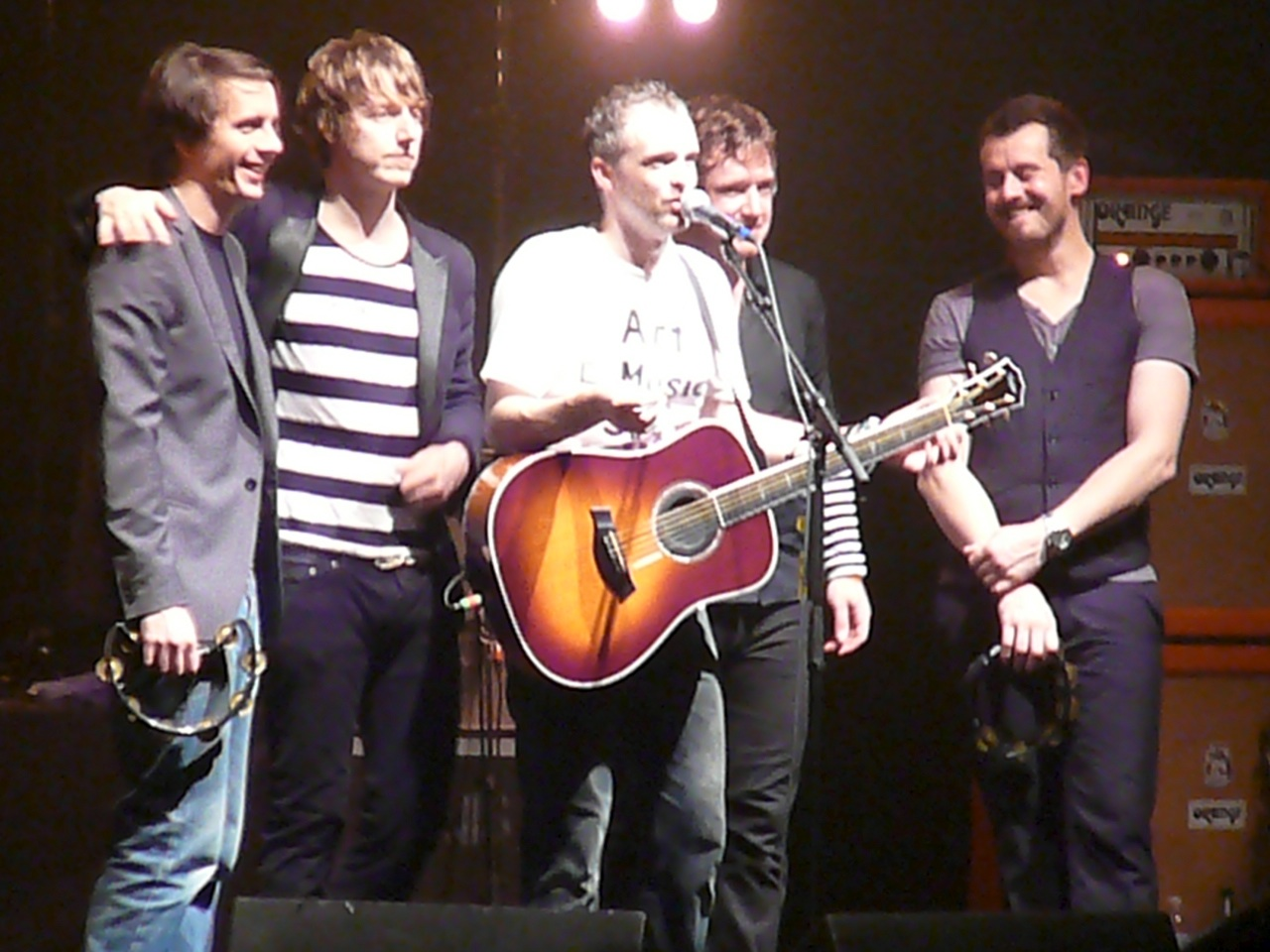
Travis in Los Angeles in 2007

From about 1997, emerging bands began to avoid the Britpop label while still producing music derived from it. Many of these bands tended to mix elements of British traditional rock (or British trad rock), particularly the Beatles, Rolling Stones and Small Faces, with American influences, including post-grunge. Drawn from across the United Kingdom, the themes of their music tended to be less parochially centered on British, English and London life and more introspective than had been the case with Britpop at its height. Several alternative bands that had enjoyed some success during the mid-1990s, but did not find major commercial success until the late 1990s, included the Verve and Radiohead. The Verve's album Urban Hymns (1997) was a worldwide hit, and Radiohead achieved near-universal critical acclaim with their experimental third album OK Computer (1997).

Post-Britpop bands have been seen as presenting the image of the rock star as an ordinary person and their increasingly melodic music was criticised for being bland or derivative. Post-Britpop bands like Travis from The Man Who (1999), Stereophonics from Performance and Cocktails (1999), Feeder from Echo Park (2001), and particularly Snow Patrol from Final Straw (2003), Keane from their debut album Hopes and Fears (2004), and Coldplay from their debut album Parachutes (2000), achieved wider international success than many of the Britpop groups that had preceded them, and were some of the most commercially successful acts of the late 1990s and early 2000s.

=== Post-hardcore and emo ===
Post-hardcore developed in the US, particularly in Chicago and Washington, D.C., in the 1980s, with bands that were inspired by the do-it-yourself ethics and guitar-heavy music of hardcore punk, but influenced by post-punk, adopting longer song formats, more complex musical structures and sometimes more melodic vocal styles.

Emo also emerged from the hardcore scene in 1980s Washington, D.C., initially as "emocore", used as a term to describe bands who favored expressive vocals over the more common abrasive, barking style. Emo broke into mainstream culture in the early 2000s with the platinum-selling success of Jimmy Eat World's Bleed American (2001) and Dashboard Confessional's The Places You Have Come to Fear the Most (2003). The new emo had a much more mainstream sound than in the 1990s and a far greater appeal among adolescents than its earlier incarnations. At the same time, use of the term emo expanded beyond the musical genre, becoming associated with fashion, a hairstyle and any music that expressed emotion. By 2003 post-hardcore bands had also caught the attention of major labels and began to enjoy mainstream success in the album charts. A number of these bands were seen as a more aggressive offshoot of emo and given the often vague label of screamo.

=== Garage rock and post-punk revivals ===
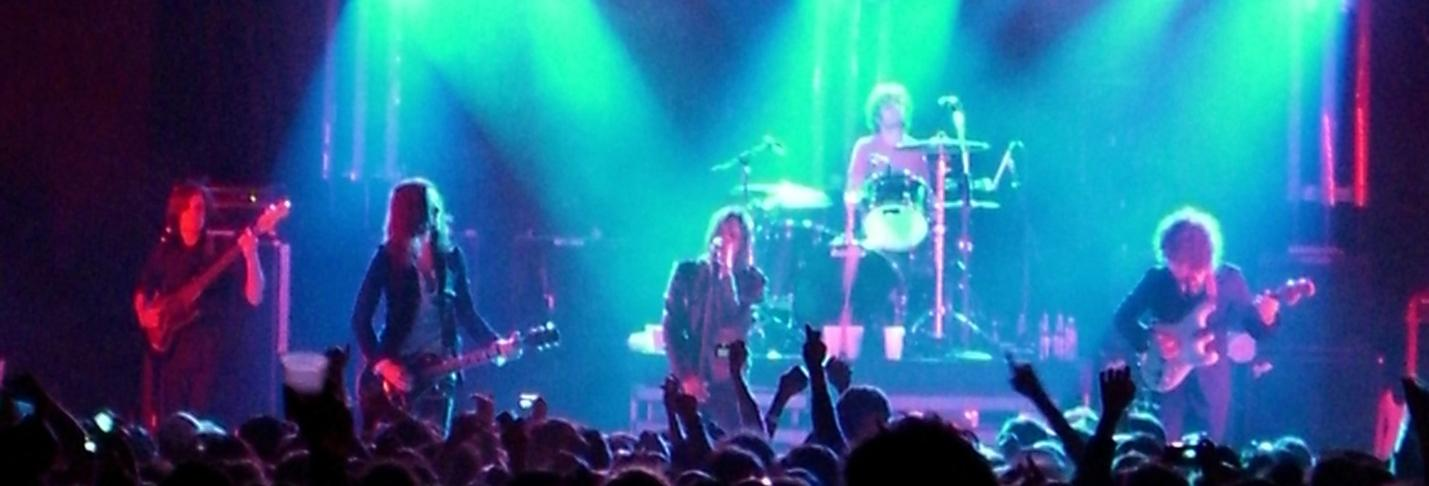
The Strokes performing in 2006

In the early 2000s, a new group of bands that played a stripped down and back-to-basics version of guitar rock, emerged into the mainstream. They were variously characterised as part of a garage rock, post-punk or new wave revival. Because the bands came from across the globe, cited diverse influences (from traditional blues, through new wave to grunge), and adopted differing styles of dress, their unity as a genre has been disputed. There had been attempts to revive garage rock and elements of punk in the 1980s and 1990s; by 2000, scenes had grown up in several countries.

The commercial breakthrough from these scenes was led by four bands: the Strokes, who emerged from the New York club scene with their debut album Is This It (2001); the White Stripes, from Detroit, with their third album White Blood Cells (2001); the Hives from Sweden after their compilation album Your New Favourite Band (2001); and the Vines from Australia with Highly Evolved (2002). They were dubbed by the media as "the saviours of rock 'n' roll". A second wave of bands that gained international recognition due to the movement included Yeah Yeah Yeahs, the Killers, Interpol and Kings of Leon from the US, the Libertines, Arctic Monkeys, Bloc Party, Kaiser Chiefs and Franz Ferdinand from the UK, and Jet from Australia.

=== Digital electronic rock ===
In the 2000s, as computer technology became more accessible and music software advanced, it became possible to create high quality music using little more than a single laptop computer. This resulted in a massive increase in the amount of home-produced electronic music available to the general public via the expanding internet. These techniques also began to be used by existing bands and by developing genres that mixed rock with digital techniques and sounds, including electroclash, dance-punk, dance rock and new rave.

=== Metalcore ===
Metalcore originated in the late 1980s combining elements of extreme metal and hardcore punk. Metalcore is noted for its use of breakdowns, which are slow, intense passages conducive to moshing, while other defining instrumentation includes heavy and percussive pedal point guitar riffs and double bass drumming. In the late 1980s to early 1990s, pioneering bands such as Integrity, Earth Crisis and Converge were founded. During the 1990s, the genre diversified, with the Dillinger Escape Plan, Botch and Coalesce pioneering mathcore.

In the 2010s and through to the 2020s, the genre saw even greater commercial success, with Bring Me the Horizon's album Post Human: Survival Horror (2020) and Architects' For Those That Wish to Exist (2021) both reaching number one in the UK album charts.

== 2010s–present: Commercial stagnation and revival scenes ==
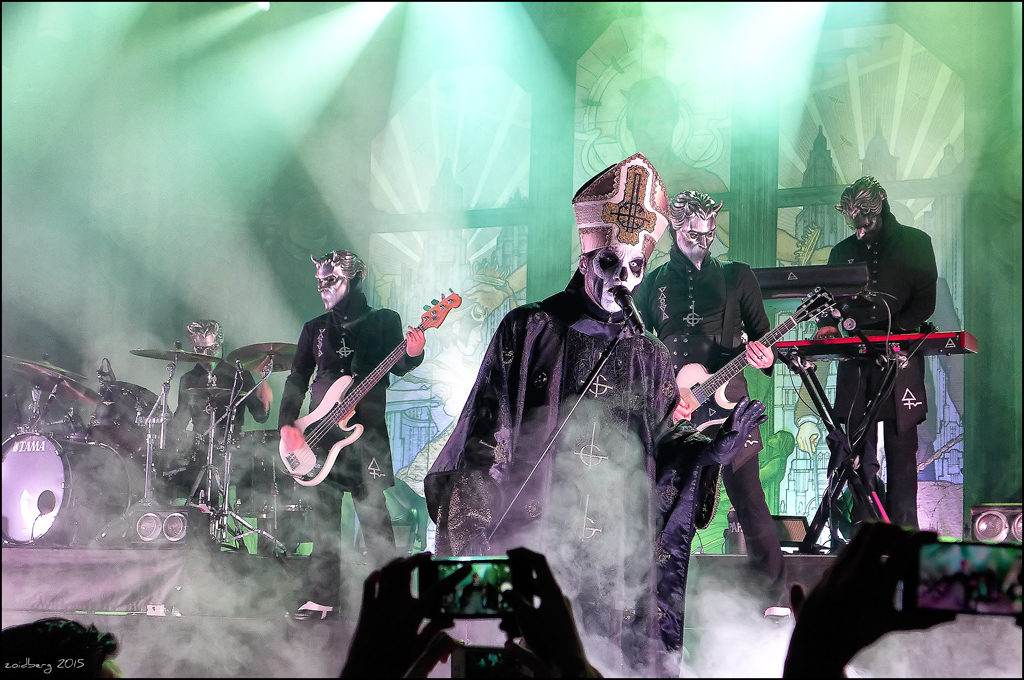
Swedish hard rock band Ghost performing in 2015

During the 2010s, rock music declined from its position as the major popular music genre, now sharing with electronic dance and hip-hop, the latter of which had surpassed it as the most consumed musical genre in the United States by 2017. The rise of streaming and the advent of technology, which changed approaches toward music creation, were cited as major factors. Ken Partridge of Genius suggested that the stagnation of rock music and rising popularity of hip-hop is the result of changing social attitudes during the 2010s. Bill Flanagan, in a 2016 opinion piece for The New York Times, compared the state of rock during this period to the state of jazz in the early 1980s: "Its form is mostly fixed."

The rock bands which had chart success in the 2010s were mostly associated with the trends that had been popular in the 2000s and earlier decades rather than reflecting new scenes and sounds. Some pop rock and hard rock bands continued to see commercial success during this period, including Ghost, Maroon 5, Twenty One Pilots, Fall Out Boy, Imagine Dragons, Halestorm, Panic! at the Disco, Greta Van Fleet, and the Black Keys.

=== Psychedelic and progressive revivals ===
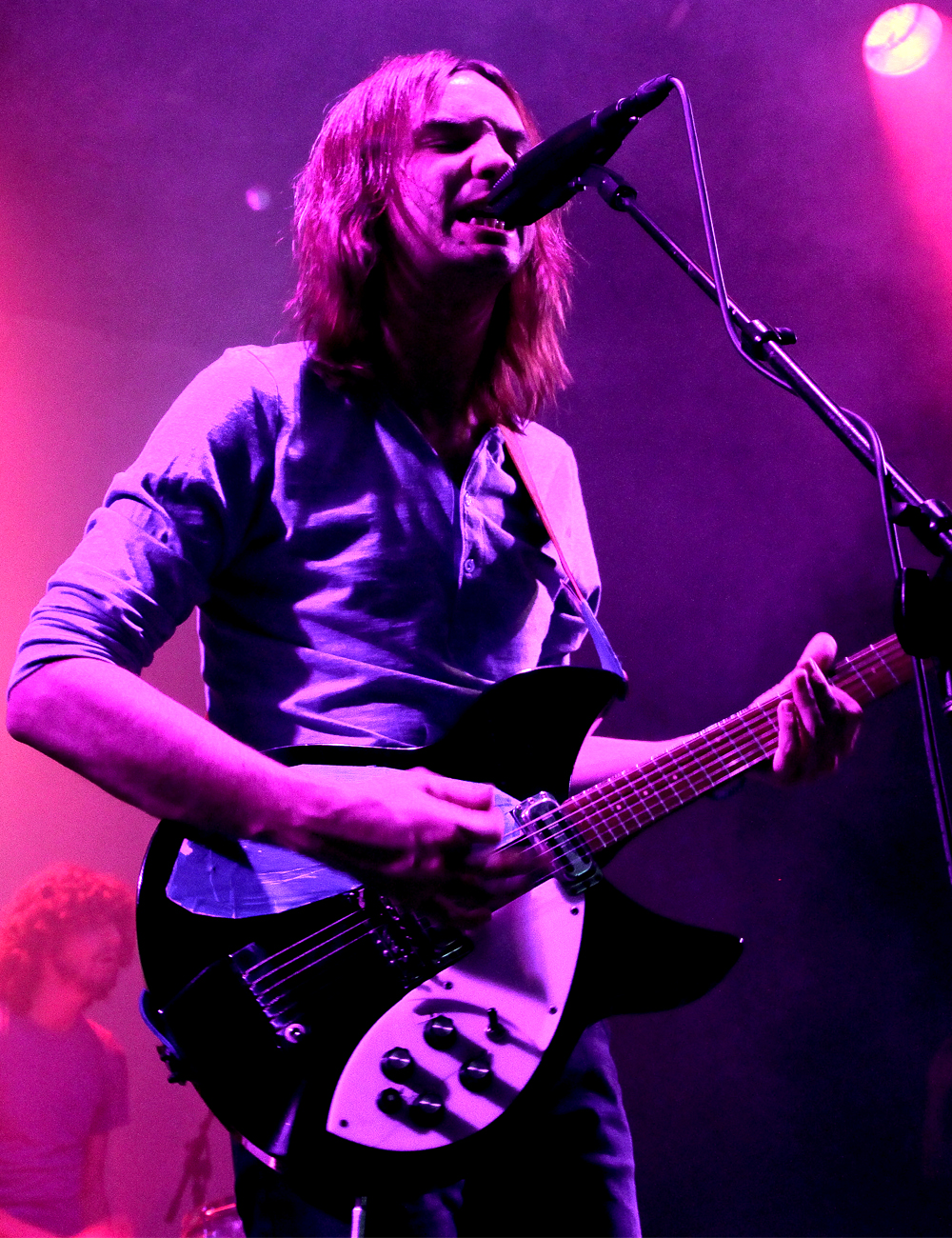
Australian neo-psychedelia musician Kevin Parker of Tame Impala performing in New York in 2013

Psychedelic and progressive styles in rock have seen a resurgence in popularity during the 2010s and 2020s. Some of the most notable acts in neo-psychedelia originated in Australia, such as King Gizzard & the Lizard Wizard and Kevin Parker's Tame Impala. The latter released well received albums such as Lonerism (2012) and Currents (2015). This new Australian psychedelic music not only built on the psychedelic and progressive rock acts of the 1960s and 1970s, but also incorporated musical influences from heavy metal, EDM, and world music. A 2014 article in The Guardian described Australia as a place where "independently minded rock bands are free to develop at their own pace".

Psychedelic trends in rock have also seen a revival in Europe, which has been described as "really good" for new psychedelic music; as a result, many American stoner rock bands choosing to tour in Europe as opposed to North America. In 2013, Queens of the Stone Age's album ...Like Clockwork topped the charts in several countries.

=== Post-punk and pop-punk revivals ===
In the late 2010s and early 2020s, a new wave of post-punk bands from Britain and Ireland emerged. Artists that have been identified as part of this wave include Squid, Fontaines D.C. and Idles. Post-punk artists that attained prominence in the 2010s and early 2020s from other countries besides the UK included Geese (United States), Kælan Mikla (Iceland), and Viagra Boys (Sweden), as well as the so-called "Russian doomer music" scene consisting of post-punk, coldwave and darkwave bands from post-Soviet countries like Russia and Belarus, most prominently Molchat Doma (Belarus).

At the start of the 2020s, pop and rap music artists released successful pop-punk-influenced recordings, including Machine Gun Kelly's 2020 album Tickets to My Downfall, which topped the Billboard 200, and Olivia Rodrigo's number-one hit single "Good 4 U" (2021).

=== Classic rock revival ===
During the mid-to-late 2010s, some bands gained notoriety for emulating rock styles of the late 1960s and 1970s popular on classic rock radio. Guitar World described this back-to-basics revival as "hard-hitting, swaggering, riff-driven rock 'n' roll built around a core vocal-guitar-bass-drum configuration". Groups considered to be a part of this trend include Greta Van Fleet, Rival Sons, and Larkin Poe.

== Social impact ==
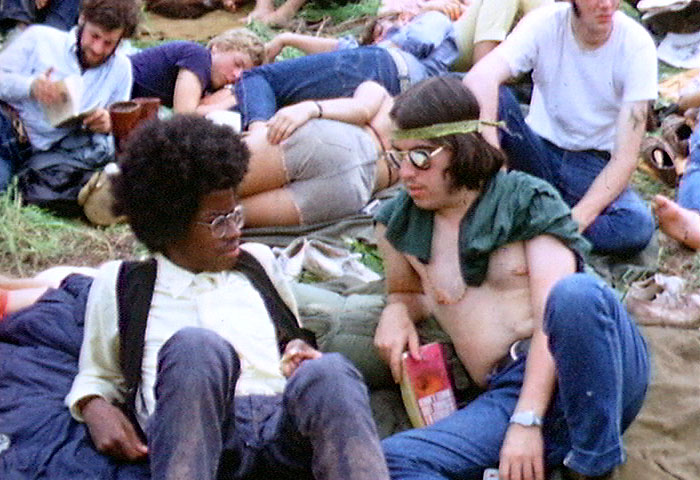
Woodstock, a three-day music festival held in Bethel, New York, in August 1969, was seen as a celebration of the countercultural lifestyle.

Different subgenres of rock were adopted by, and became central to, the identity of a large number of sub-cultures. In the 1950s and 1960s, respectively, British youths adopted the Teddy Boy and rocker subcultures, which revolved around US rock and roll. The counterculture of the 1960s was associated with much of the rock music of the era. The mid- to late 1970s punk subculture began in the US and spread worldwide. The goth and emo subcultures that grew later presented distinctive visual styles.

When an international rock culture developed, it supplanted cinema as the major source of fashion influence. However, followers of rock music have often mistrusted the world of fashion, which has been seen as elevating image above substance. Rock fashions have been seen as combining elements of different cultures and periods, as well as expressing divergent views on sexuality and gender, and rock music in general has been noted and criticised for facilitating greater sexual freedom. Rock has also been associated with various forms of drug use, including the amphetamines taken by mods in the early to mid-1960s, the LSD, mescaline and other hallucinogenic drugs linked with psychedelic rock in the mid- to late 1960s and early 1970s; and sometimes cannabis, cocaine and heroin, all of which have been eulogised in song.

Rock has been credited with changing attitudes to race by opening up African-American culture to white audiences. However, at the same time, rock has been accused of appropriating and exploiting that culture. Rock music has absorbed many influences and introduced Western audiences to different musical traditions, and inherited the folk tradition of protest song, making political statements on subjects such as war, religion, poverty, civil rights, justice and the environment. Activism reached a mainstream peak with the "Do They Know It's Christmas?" single (1984) and Live Aid concert for Ethiopia in 1985, which, while raising awareness of world poverty and funds for aid, have also been criticised (along with similar events), for providing a stage for self-aggrandisement and increased profits for the rock stars involved.

Since its early development, rock music has been associated with rebellion against social and political norms, most in early rock and roll's rejection of an adult-dominated culture, the counterculture's rejection of consumerism and conformity and punk's rejection of all forms of social convention; however, it can also be seen as providing a means of commercial exploitation of such ideas and of diverting youth away from political action.

=== Role of women ===
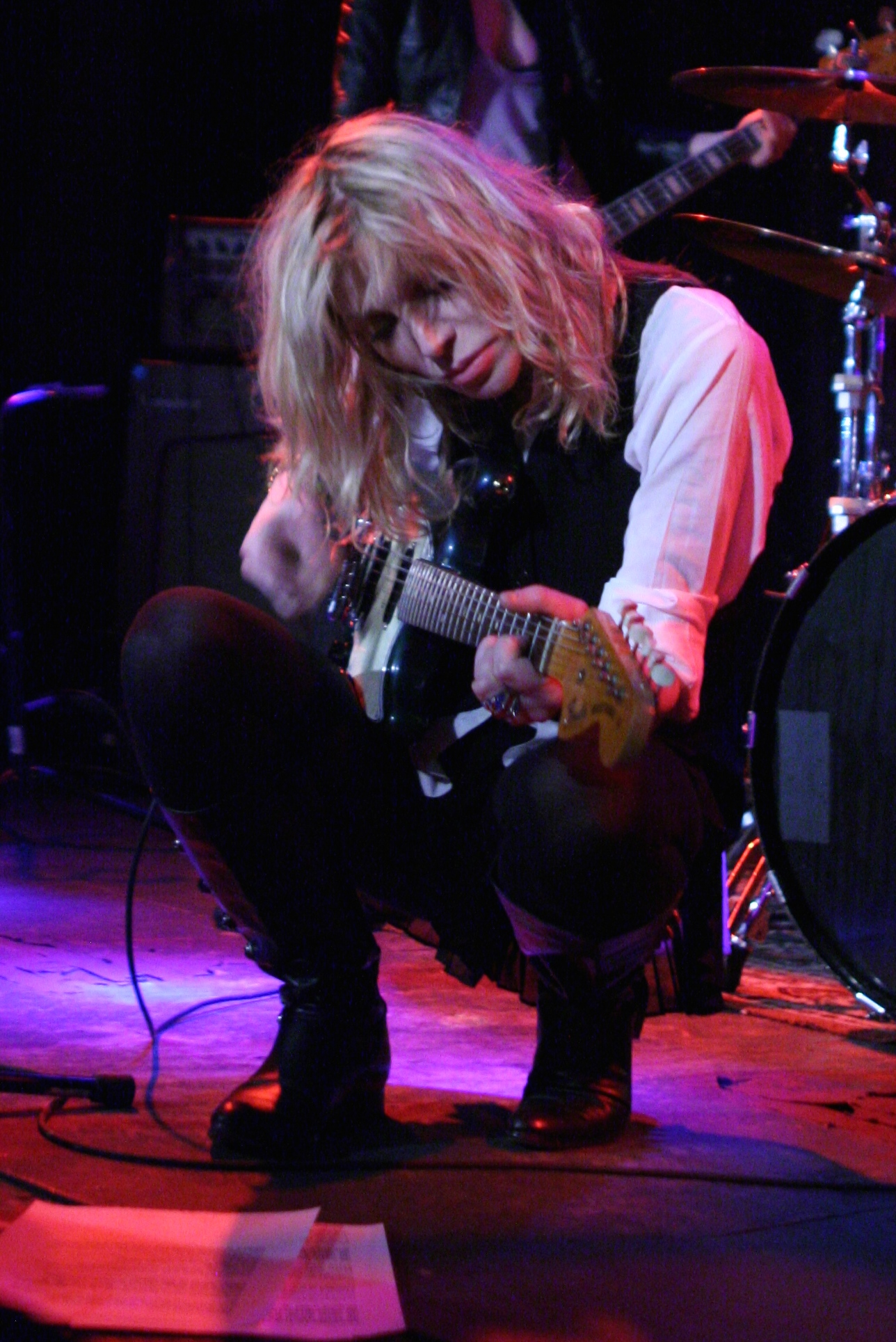
Courtney Love performing with Hole in 2012

According to Schaap and Berkers, playing in a band is a peer group experience "shaped by existing sex-segregated friendship networks". They write: "Several scholars have argued that men exclude women from bands or from the bands' rehearsals, recordings, performances, and other social activities ... Women are mainly regarded as passive and private consumers of allegedly slick, prefabricated – hence, inferior – pop music, excluding them from participating as high status rock musicians".

In the early decades of rock music, rebellion "was largely a male rebellion; the women—often, in the 1950s and 60s, girls in their teens—in rock usually sang songs as personae, utterly dependent on their macho boyfriends." Philip Auslander says that "although there were many women in rock by the late 1960s, most performed only as singers, a traditionally feminine position in popular music." Some women played instruments in American all-female garage rock bands, but none of these bands achieved more than regional success. When Suzi Quatro emerged in 1973, "no other prominent female musician worked in rock simultaneously as a singer, instrumentalist, songwriter, and bandleader".

An all-female band is a musical group that is exclusively composed of female musicians. This is distinct from a girl group, in which the female members are vocalists; however, this terminology is not universally followed.

== See also ==
- Blues
- Country music
- Electronic dance music
- Folk music
- Gospel music
- Hip-hop
- Jazz music
- Pop music
- Rhythm and blues
- Soul music
- Computational musicology
- List of rock genres
- Heavy metal genres
- Punk rock subgenres
- List of hardcore punk subgenres
- List of mainstream rock performers
- Lists of rock artists

== Further reading and listening ==
- Bogdanov, V.; Woodstra, C.; Erlewine, S. T., eds. (2002). All Music Guide to Rock: the Definitive Guide to Rock, Pop, and Soul (3rd ed.). Milwaukee, WI: Backbeat Books. ISBN 0-87930-653-X.
- Christgau, Robert (1992). "B.E.: A Dozen Moments in the Prehistory of Rock and Roll". Details.
- Gilliland, John (1969). "Crammer: A lively cram course on the history of rock and some other things" (audio). Pop Chronicles. University of North Texas Libraries.
- Robinson, Richard. Pop, Rock, and Soul. New York: Pyramid Books, 1972. ISBN 0-0515-2660-3.
- Shepherd, J., ed. (2003). Continuum Encyclopedia of Popular Music of the World: Volume II: Performance and Production. New York: Continuum. ISBN 0-8264-6322-3.
- Szatmary, David P. Rockin' in Time: a Social History of Rock-and-Roll. 3rd ed. Upper Saddle River NJ: Prentice-Hall, 1996. xvi, 320 p., ill., mostly with b&w photos. ISBN 0-13-440678-8.
