= Country music (disambiguation) =

Country music is a blend of popular musical forms originally found in the Southern United States and the Appalachian Mountains. The term also includes Western music (North America) which had similar origins in the Western United States and Rocky Mountains.

Country Music may also refer to:

- Country Music (magazine), a bi-monthly magazine on country music
- Country Music (miniseries), 2019

== Albums ==
- Country Music (Willie Nelson album), 2010
- Country Music (Marty Stuart album), 2003
- Country Music, an album by Flatt and Scruggs

== See also ==
- Australian country music
- Christian country music
- List of country genres
