= Little Texas (Tokyo restaurant) =

Coordinates: 35°38′05″N 139°42′45″E

- Interactive map of Little Texas

Restaurant information
- Owners: Takeshi Yoshino and Natsuko Grace Yoshino
- Food type: Texan cuisine
- Dress code: Casual, Western wear
- Location: Meguro-Daiichi-Bldg. B1F 1-5-19, Meguro, Tokyo, Japan
- Website: www.littletexas.jp

Little Texas (リトルテキサス, Ritoru Tekisasu) is a honky-tonk and Texan cuisine restaurant in Meguro, Tokyo, Japan. Opened in 2005, it is owned and operated by Takeshi Yoshino and his wife Natsuko Grace Yoshino. Takeshi heard Japanese country music artist Dave Kuboi and became fascinated with Westerns, Western wear, and the Western lifestyle. It is one of the main venues for country and Western music in Japan.

The restaurant is decorated with memorabilia from the Southern and Southwestern United States. Its menu focuses on food inspired by Texas, and its neighboring states of Louisiana, Oklahoma, and New Mexico, including steak, tacos, chicken-fried steak, jambalaya, Texas-shaped dessert waffles, along with related Japanese cuisine dishes like taco rice. But it also includes broader American cuisine influenced foods, hot dogs and spaghetti and meatballs.

As a music venue for Japanese country and western musicians, it features a stage and dance floor. They also offer line dance lessons.

In 2011, then–Texas Governor Rick Perry named Takeshi and Natsuco Yoshino honorary Texans.

== See also ==
- Tomi Fujiyama
- Charlie Nagatani
