= George Wade (musician) =

Canadian musician (1895–1975)

George Wade and his Cornhuskers were a popular Canadian country band during the 1920s and 1930s. They specialized in traditional folk music with a Western or cowboy influence, focusing on fiddle tunes and reels. The band was renowned for their lively performances of square dancing, reels, waltzes, and medleys, as well as pure country material. Their music was heavily influenced by traditional Canadian and American music and often played for country crowds. The group used traditional instruments such as the fiddle, accordion, and banjo and was one of the most famous country groups in Canada during their time.

George Wade was born around 1895 in Manitoba, Canada, and led the Cornhuskers from their base in Toronto, Ontario. In the mid-1920s, Wade, as a square dance caller, became a prominent figure in the Canadian music scene and performed for dances in Ontario and Quebec. In 1928, the band started broadcasting on CFRB, Toronto, and in 1933 they became the first of their kind to perform on the Canadian Radio Broadcasting Commission (CRBC). Wade and his ensemble were heard regularly on the CRBC (where by the end of their first ten shows, 6,000 fan letters had come in for George Wade and his Cornhuskers), and later on CBC Radio until the late 1930s. Along with their success on the airwaves, the Cornhuskers were famous for their live performances. They toured extensively throughout Canada, including the Maritimes in 1933 and Western Canada in the mid-1930s. Their repertoire consisted of quadrilles, reels, jigs, and medleys of Scottish and Irish tunes, as well as pure country material. The band was renowned for its large size, which ranged from four to fifteen members, and included fiddlers, pianists, banjo players, guitarists, and bassists. Among their members were some of Canada's most talented musicians, including Quebec fiddler Jean Carignan and pianist Johnny Burt.

In 1933, the Cornhuskers recorded over a dozen 78 RPM records for RCA Victor Company. These records typically featured a small group consisting of two or three fiddles, banjo, piano, harmonica, and sometimes a singer credited as 'Pete, the Mountain Boy.' Although the band's personnel changed frequently, their sound remained consistent, blending elements of jazz and country to create a unique style that was all their own.

When World War II began, the Cornhuskers' recording career came to an end, and they disbanded. Wade died in Toronto on January 23, 1975.
