= Good Time Charlie =

Good Time Charlie

- Good Time Charlie, song by Bobby Bland
- Good Time Charlie, country album by Charlie McCoy
- "Good Time Charlie", song by Gasolin from Gas 5
- "Good Time Charlie", song by Priests from The Seduction of Kansas
- Good Time Charlie, a term used for the flamboyant life style of U.S. Representative Charlie Wilson.
- Good Time Charlie, nickname for Japanese country musician Charlie Nagatani
