= List of country genres =

This is a list of music subgenres of country music.

- Alternative country
  - Americana
  - Cosmic country
  - Cowpunk
  - Gothic country
  - Roots rock
- Australian country
  - Bush band
- Bakersfield sound
- Bluegrass
  - Progressive bluegrass
  - Traditional bluegrass
- Blue Yodeling
- Bro-country
- Cajun music
  - Cajun fiddle
- Canadian country
  - Franco-country
- Christian country
- Classic country
- Country and Irish
- Country blues
- Country folk
- Country pop
- Country rap
- Country rock
- Cowboy pop
- Dansband
- Gulf and Western
- Hokum
- Honky tonk
- Lubbock sound
- Nashville sound
  - Countrypolitan
- Neotraditional country
- Old-time
- Outlaw country
- Progressive country
- Regional Mexican
- Rockabilly
  - Psychobilly
    - Gothabilly
- Scrumpy and Western
- Southern rock
- Southern soul
- Sertanejo
- Talking blues
- Truck-driving country
- Western music
  - New Mexico music
  - Red dirt (music)
  - Tejano music
  - Texas country
  - Western swing
- Zydeco
