= Canadian folk music =

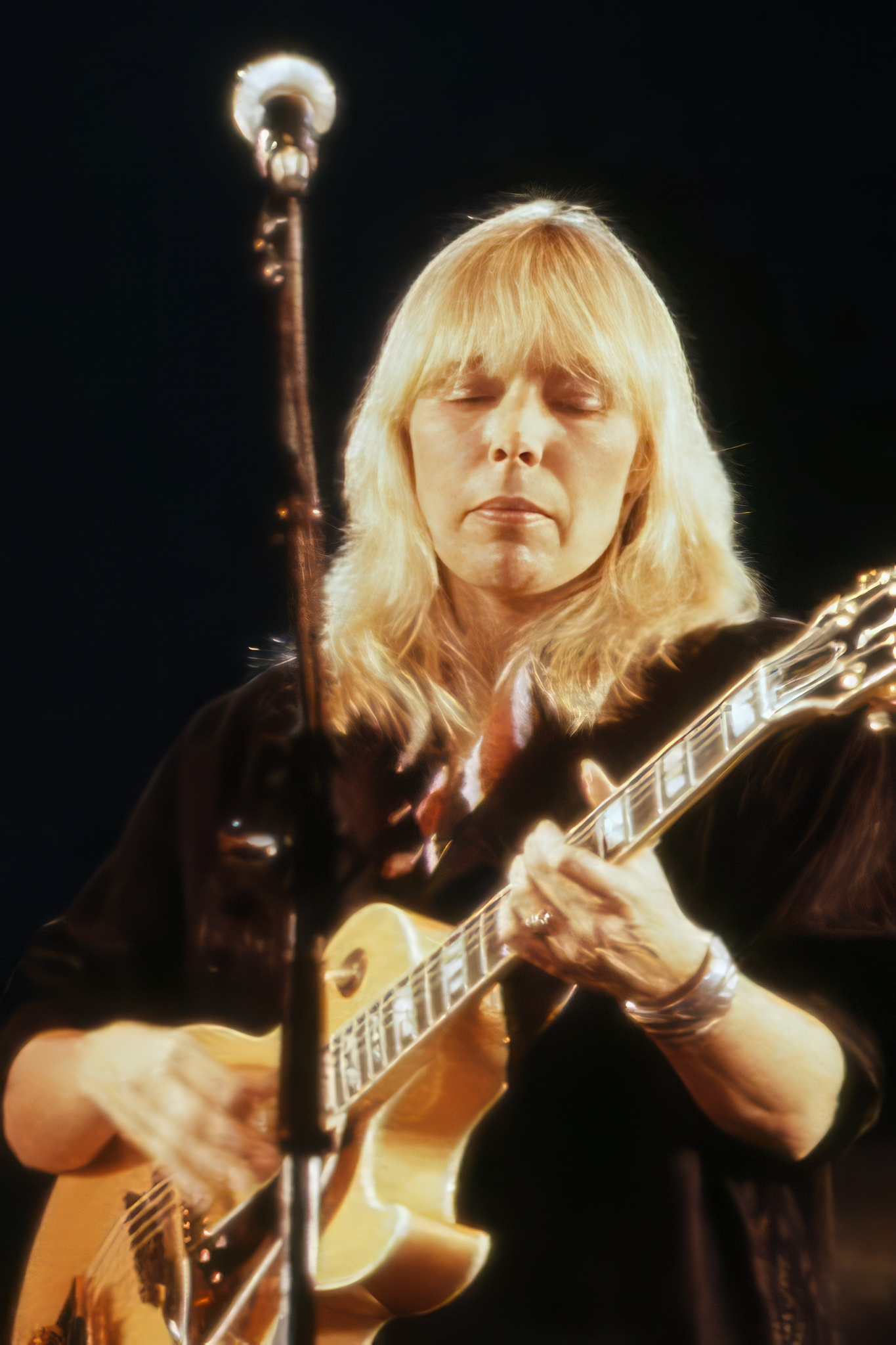
Saskatchewan native Joni Mitchell, one of the most influential folk and popular music singer songwriters of the 20th century.

Canadian folk music has a long history, dating from the 16th and 17th centuries, mostly derived from the music of early settlers and much earlier from the music of indigenous people. Folk music thus differentiates between traditional and contemporary. Many of Canada's most influential folk artists emerged in the contemporary folk music era, notably Bruce Cockburn, American-born Buffy Sainte-Marie, Ferron, Gordon Lightfoot, Joni Mitchell, Kate & Anna McGarrigle, Leonard Cohen, Murray McLauchlan, Stan Rogers, Valdy, Penny Lang, The Rankin Family and Wade Hemsworth. Canadian artists in folk rock include The Band, Neil Young, Beau Dommage, Kashtin, Spirit of the West, The Tragically Hip, Great Big Sea, Les Cowboys Fringants, Serena Ryder, and Dan Mangan.

In the 1970s, chansonniers grew steadily less popular with the encroachment of popular rock bands and other artists, and many of the folk clubs, such as the Montreal Folk Workshop, and groups such as The Raftsmen, the Mountain City Four and, eventually, The Travellers, that had served to foster the mid-20th century revival closed down. Some new performers did emerge, however, including Jacques Michel, Claude Dubois, and Robert Charlebois.

The Canadian Folk Music Awards are presented annually to musicians carrying on the tradition.

== Elements of Canadian folk music ==
Most genres of music have their known instruments that are played to compose a song. The principal instrument for Canadian folk music is known to be the fiddle. The first record of a fiddle in Canada is in 1645 at a wedding in Quebec on the 27th of November. After this account it seems that reports of fiddles are rare for the next 100 years. However, despite this hiatus in reports, the fiddle remains a well-known instrument among folk musicians and music.

== See also ==
- Indigenous music of Canada
- Canadian fiddling
  - Cape Breton fiddle
  - Quebec fiddle
- Podorythmie
- Canadian country music
- Celtic music in Canada
