= Canadian country music =

Genre of popular music from Canada

Canadian country music originated in the early 20th century, with roots in the diverse musical practices of the Appalachian region of Eastern North America. Appalachian folk music was largely Scottish and Irish, with an important influence also being the African American country blues. Parts of Ontario, British Columbia and the Maritime provinces shared a tradition with the Appalachian region, and country music became popular quite quickly in these places. Fiddlers like George Wade and Don Messer helped to popularize the style beginning in the late 1920s. Wade was not signed until the 1930s, when Victor Records, inspired by the success of Wilf Carter the year before, signed him, Hank Snow and Hank LaRivière.

Canadian country as developed by Carter, Snow, Otto Wilke, Earl Heywood, and Stu Davis used a less nasal and more distinctly pronounced vocal style than American country music, and stuck with more traditional ballads and narratives while US country began to use more songs about bars, family relationships, and quarrels between lovers. This style of country music became very popular in Canada over the next couple of decades. Later popular Canadian country stars range from Stompin' Tom Connors and Tom Jackson to Shania Twain and Rick Tippe to Dean Brody, Brett Kissel, Paul Brandt and Jess Moskaluke.

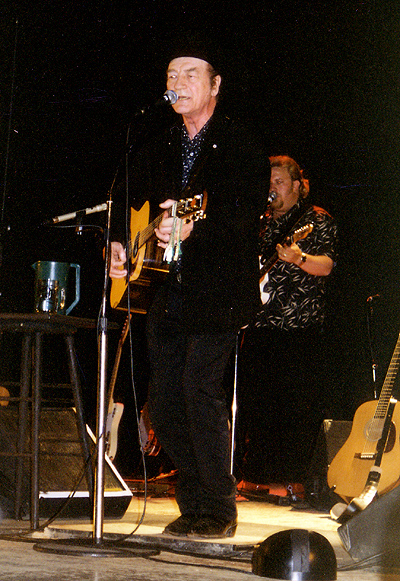
Stompin' Tom Connors, 2005

Canadian-American rock artists the Band and Neil Young were influential in the early fusion of country and rock. A hybrid alternative country/roots rock scene based on Toronto's Queen Street West in the 1980s and 90s, pioneered by musician and community radio host Handsome Ned, launched artists including Blue Rodeo, Prairie Oyster, Skydiggers, and Cowboy Junkies. Country rock group Blue Rodeo became among the best-selling Canadian musicians in Canada. Country pop artists with crossover successes on pop charts include Anne Murray, Susan Aglukark, Shania Twain, Amanda Stott, and MacKenzie Porter.

Country music radio and television stations in Canada have sometimes defined the genre more flexibly than their counterparts in the United States. Artists more commonly associated with folk or contemporary folk music who have achieved country airplay include Bruce Cockburn, Leahy, Spirit of the West and the Rankin Family. The latter three also represent crossover from the Canadian Celtic music scene.

There is a small Francophone scene in country music, typically sung in the joual dialect. Francophone artists include Renée Martel, Gildor Roy, Patrick Norman, Willie Lamothe, Steph Carse and Georges Hamel. The streaming music service Spotify reported that between 2019 and 2025, streaming of Francophone Canadian country music had increased 286% in Canada and 280% worldwide. The inaugural Canadian Country Music Award for Francophone artist of the year was awarded in 2025. The winner Salebarbes and nominees Francis Degrandpré, Fred Dionne, Sara Dufour, and Vince Lemire had seen average increases in their worldwide streams exceeding 80% in one year.

Indigenous country artists in Canada include Susan Aglukark, Don Amero, Billy ThunderKloud & the Chieftones, Edward Gamblin, Tom Jackson, Charlie Panigoniak, William Prince, and Crystal Shawanda.

The Calgary Stampede provides a majority of the annual income to some local musicians in Alberta. The Coca-Cola stage provides a mix of Canadian and cross-Alberta performers while the Nashville North tent provides a stage for numerous commercial country acts. The Western Oasis schedules traditional folk and country acts for their Window on the West series, but most Calgary country, folk and roots musicians will be found performing throughout the city during the Stampede, often playing upwards of four gigs per day.

== See also ==
- Canadian Country Music Association, organizer of the Canadian Country Music Awards
- Canadian fiddling
  - Cape Breton fiddling
  - Quebec fiddling
- Canadian folk music
- Celtic music in Canada
