= Country music in Nigeria =

Country music in Nigeria has enjoyed high levels of popularity since first being introduced to the country in the middle of the 20th century. Within Nigeria, country music is generally classified as "sentimental music" - a Nigeria-specific genre that includes non-country musical acts.

== History ==
Country music originated in the southern United States in the 1920s where it evolved as a fusion of Appalachian music and Blues largely through the efforts of commercial record producers who sought to popularize traditional folk melodies from the rural United States. Country is musically similar to Western, although the latter tends to be more evocative of themes and imagery associated with the western United States, particularly that of the Old West era.

Country was introduced to Nigeria in the middle 20th century by a combination of visiting American Christian missionaries from the southern United States, by returning Nigerian expatriates, and by a Don Williams-owned radio station that operated in the nation. By the 1960s, the genre had become "a part of everyday Nigerian life". As of the mid 1990s, country music remained highly popular among Nigerian radio listeners. By the early 2010s, interest in country music had lessened in major metropolitan areas, but continued to enjoy popularity in Middle Belt states, notably including Plateau, whose state capital Jos has been described as Nigeria's "home of country music". American country singer Jim Reeves, who died in 1964, has had a special staying power as a cultural icon in Nigeria and, as of the early 2010s, his recordings continued to be popular as a form of comfort music listened to in familial settings.

Nigerian music audiences have tended not to recognize country music as a unique genre but have grouped it into a constructed genre of "sentimental music" which has been described by Public Radio International as a "catch-all category that essentially referred to everything Western that wasn’t dance music".

== Local acts ==
As in other parts of Africa where country music is popular, country music in Nigeria is dominated by recordings from American artists. However, a small number of Nigerian country and country-western musical acts have gained varying levels of popularity; examples of such artists include Emma Ogosi, Ogak Jay Oke, Bongos Ikwue, and Poor Charley Akaa.

== See also ==
- Nigeria–United States relations
- Country music in Canada
- Music of Nigeria
