= The Devil's Dream =

The Devil's Dream
Tune for The Devil's Dream

"The Devil's Dream" is an old fiddle tune of unknown origins. Played as either a jig or a reel, it is attested to as a popular tune from at least 1834 in New England. It also appears in a folk tale from central England dated to c. 1805.

The Devil's Dream is, and has been since its introduction, a popular tune with fiddlers and dancers and has been recorded numerous times.

== Recordings ==
The earliest known recordings of the tune include records by John Witzmann (in 1906 with the Victor Dance Orchestra and again in 1920), Harold Veo (1917), George Stehl (1920), William B. Houchens (February 1923), Jasper Bisbee (November 1923) and Tommy Dandurand (March 1927).

== Pop culture ==
It is used by Bernard Herrmann as one of the principal themes in the film score to the movie The Devil and Daniel Webster to represent the plight of the New Hampshire farmers.

Mentioned in Michael Martin Murphey's song Cherokee Fiddle, popularized by Johnny Lee. The song was also featured on the consonant sound animated insert on Sesame Street that featured an animated violinist playing the song on a violin until the violinist's violin strings broke. Pa from Little House on the Prairie plays the song on the fiddle in the first book of the series, Little House in the Big Woods.

It is used in the film 12 Years a Slave in the opening scenes, played by the character Solomon Northup during a small gathering of white individuals dancing. It was played by Tim Fain, an accomplished violinist who co-arranged the soundtrack for the movie.

Appears in the film Rosemary's Baby (1968) on a television showing a Western film's barroom brawl.

== See also ==
- Quebec fiddle

== Bibliography ==
- Allies, Jabez. On the Ignis Fatusus: Or Will-O'-The-Wisp, and the Fairies. London: Simpkin, Marshall, and Co. (1846).
- Gilman, S. (A Member). Memoirs of a New England Village Choir with Occasional Reflections. Boston: Benjamin H. Greene (1834).
