= Dream Rovers =

Iranian country band

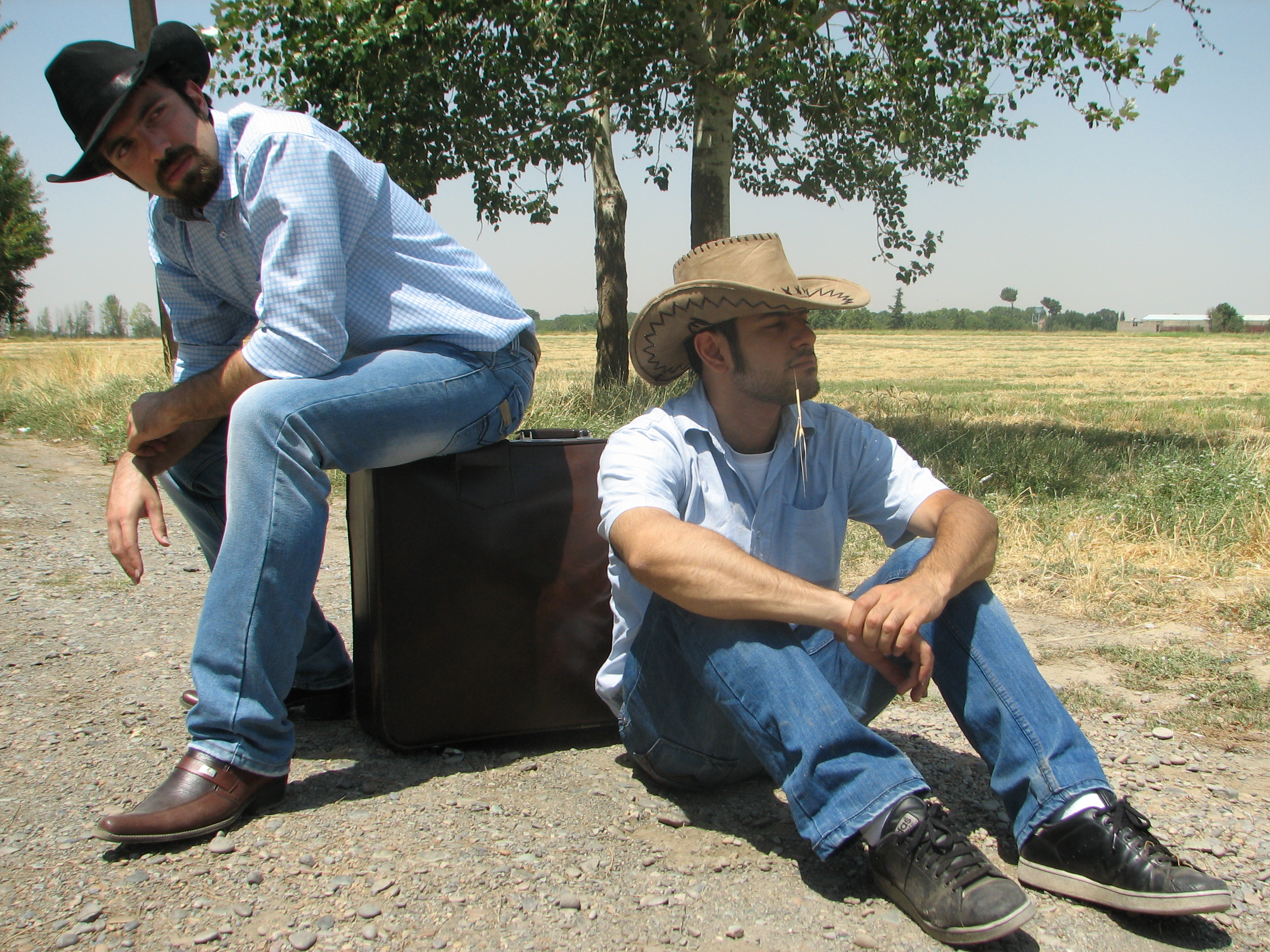
- Erfan Rezayatbakhsh aka Elf(left), Ahmad Motevasel

Background information
- Origin: Tehran, Iran
- Genres: Country
- Years active: 2007–present
- Members: Erfan Rezayatbakhsh (elf); Ahmad Motevasel
- Past members: Parham Doustdar; Majid Sadeghi (Dijam)

Dream Rovers is a country band from Tehran, Iran and is considered the pioneer of country music in Iran. The band was founded by the singer-songwriter Erfan (Elf) Rezayatbakhsh with various members throughout the years such as Ahmad Motevassel, lead guitarist and recording engineer.

== History ==
=== Persian Rovers ===
In January 2007, the band was formed under the name Persian Rovers in Tehran by singer Erfan Rezayatbakhsh. The band primarily produced old cover songs. After Rezayatbakhsh came back from his military conscription in April 2007, the band decided to start recording original songs. The duo disbanded in October of that same year, having only successfully prepared a demo for the song "February Snow."

=== Dream Rovers ===
After the end of Persian Rovers, Rezayatbakhsh started recruiting by talking to Majid Sadeghi with whom he got acquainted years ago at university.

== 2008–present ==
In March 2008, when the band was working on their arrangement of "Cloudy Sky," Majid met Ahmad Motevasel, a self taught guitar player.

== Artistry ==
Because the members live in a non-American society and culture, along with members having different musical tastes have led to some innovations in their rendition of country music such as switching the style of the song from country to rock and sometimes switching back to country.

== Members ==
- Honeyeh Rezayatbakhsh: Violin (Rezayatbakhsh's sister who usually cooperates with the band in studio as violinist and recording supervisor)
- Makan Mahmoudi: Bass Guitar (accompanied the band in all concerts in SUT)
- Mohammad Shojaie: Drums (collaborated with the band in studio and 2011 SUT concert as drummer)
- Soheil Rezanejad: Piano (accompanied the band in second and third SUT concert as the pianist)
- Omid Mazra'e : Drums (the 2012 SUT Concert drummer)
- Parham Doustdar: Recording supervisor, piano (in studio and first concert at SUT)
- Majid Sadeghi: Bass (Four songs in the band's debut album Off the Road)

== Discography ==
=== Flashback ===
An album consisting of cover songs from the 1970s and earlier| Track listing: (as shown on the cover of the album)

              Don't Play Your Rock'n'Roll To Me…………… Mike Chapman (1975)
              Sixteen Tons……………………………………………  Merle Travis (1946)
              Delilah……………………………………………………… Barry Mason (1968)
              Hungry Eyes……………………………………………… Merle Haggard (1969)
              Imagine……………………………………………………..John Lennon (1971)
              Mambo Italiano………………………………………….Bob Merrill (1954)

=== Off the Road ===
The title of the band's debut album which includes the original songs of Dream Rovers.

==== Track listing ====
No.	Title	Writer(s)	Length
1.	"February Snow" (Melody by Erfan Rezayatbakhsh)	Shel Silverstein	3:31
2.	"Dear Superstar"	Erfan Rezayatbakhsh	3:07
3.	"Too Many Nights Alone" (Melody by Erfan Rezayatbakhsh)	Shel Silverstein	4:00
4.	"Gonna Be"	Erfan Rezayatbakhsh	2:21
5.	"Cloudy Sky" (Melody by Erfan Rezayatbakhsh)	Shel Silverstein, Erfan Rezayatbakhsh	4:03
6.	"Insomnia"	Erfan Rezayatbakhsh	4:06
7.	"Stutter"	Erfan Rezayatbakhsh	3:33
8.	"Tonight"	Erfan Rezayatbakhsh	4:23
Total length:			29:06

== Live performance ==
Despite all of the restrictions placed on bands and artists who attempt to perform and play western music in Iran – a country notorious for forcing aspiring artists to toil underground in obscurity – Dream Rovers have managed to perform live on three occasions at Sharif University of Technology (SUT) between May 2011 and May 2012 in front of audiences of more than 500 people – an unheard of number under such a restrictive regime.

== Singles ==
=== Dear Superstar ===
Dear Superstar is the first single of the band from their debut album, Off the Road written by the vocalist, Erfan Rezayatbakhsh in form of a letter to the country-pop superstar, Taylor Swift. The idea of the song was inspired by a time when Rezayatbakhsh was watching a documentary about FGM (Female Genital Mutilation) and when he changed the channel there was a video of Taylor Swift in which she was at the same age of the FGM victims he was just watching. According to him, he only wanted to remind Taylor that some of her fans have completely different lives than what she has. So, that would be a good idea for the superstar to sing about her living-in-misery fans sometimes. The video of the song was directed by Ali T and shot in Tehran on the last day of the year in 2011.

=== Without Even Saying Goodbye ===
A fusion of Persian traditional music and country music written by elf. This single was recorded in the Summer of 2014 in Melbourne, Florida. Ehsan Tootoonchi is the featuring artist in this track who accompanies elf with his Taar.

=== The Girl I Know ===
The first Single of Dream Rovers' third studio album. Which was recorded in Johnson City, Tennessee in 2014. The music video was also filmed and edited in Johnson City in November 2014 by Ryan Renfro.

=== I've Been Everywhere ===
The first bilingual song which is mostly in Persian. Was recorded and released in 2016.

=== 2012 to 2016 ===
In December 2012, Erfan (elf) moved to Johnson City, Tennessee to be the first Iranian student at East Tennessee State University's Bluegrass, Old Time and Country Music program. He was awarded Public Performance and Pulmer's scholarships and graduated summa cum laude on 13 December 2014 and became the first Iranian ever who graduated the program. Erfan recorded one single while studying at ETSU named "The Girl I Know" and, shortly before his graduation in December 2014, he made the music video in Johnson City, Tennessee and moved to Canada on New Year's Eve 2015. The music video of The Girl I know was featured on Voice of America's "Top Ten" show on 5 May 2015.
