= Country music =

Music genre

- Other names: Country; Country and western
- Stylistic origins: American folk and Western; Appalachian; Cajun; red dirt; Southern gospel; old-time
- Cultural origins: 1920s, United States
- Typical instruments: Acoustic guitar; electric guitar; pedal steel guitar; lap steel guitar; bass guitar; upright bass; banjo; mandolin; fiddle; harmonica; vocals; piano
- Derivative forms: Bluegrass; cowboy pop; dansband; zydeco

Subgenres
- Alternative; Christian; honky-tonk; neo-traditional; outlaw; progressive; cosmic country; truck-driving; Western swing; (complete list)

Fusion genres
- Country folk; country rap; country rock; country pop; bro-country; cowpunk; Gulf and Western; rockabilly; gothabilly; psychobilly; Southern soul; Southern rock; swamp rock

Regional scenes
- Australia; Canada; Mexico; Ireland; Nigeria; Philippines

Local scenes
- Bakersfield; Atlanta; Nashville; Texas

Other topics
- Country music by year; country musicians; classic country; singing cowboy

Country music, also known as country and western or simply country, is a music genre originating from the United States. It is known for its ballads and dance tunes, identifiable by both traditional lyrics and harmonies accompanied by banjos, mandolins, fiddles, harmonicas, and many types of guitar; either acoustic, electric, steel, or resonator guitars. Once called hillbilly music, the term country music was popularized in the 1940s.

Country music was first developed in the South, and then spread throughout the Piedmont, from Louisiana along the Appalachian Mountains to New York. The music is believed to be derived from British folk music, brought to the United States during early waves of immigration. Rooted in American folk music, such as old-time and Southern Appalachian music, many traditions blended to form country music. In particular, this included cowboy and vaquero Western music and African-American traditional folk songs and spirituals. Mexican, Irish, and Gospel music have had a formative influence on the genre, as have Polynesian Hawaiian music and the Southwestern styles of New Mexico and Tejano, in addition to blues modes from blues music.

Country music has remained an integral part of the American music scene, with a recent revitalization in interest since the early 2020s. In 2023, 45% of Americans reported listening to country music, an increase in the genre's popularity.

== Origins ==
The main components of the modern country music style date back to music traditions throughout the Southern United States and Southwestern United States, while its place in American popular music was established in the 1930s during the early days of music recording. According to country historian Bill C. Malone, country music was "introduced to the world as a Southern phenomenon."

Migration into the southern Appalachian Mountains, of the Southeastern United States, brought the folk music and instruments of Europe and the Mediterranean Basin along with it for nearly 300 years, which developed into Appalachian music. As the country expanded westward, the Mississippi River and Louisiana became a crossroads for country music, giving rise to Cajun music. In the Southwestern United States, it was the Rocky Mountains, American frontier, and Rio Grande that acted as a similar backdrop for Native American, Mexican, and cowboy ballads, which resulted in New Mexico music and the development of western music, and it is directly related to Red Dirt, Texas country, and Tejano music styles. In Oceania, the steel guitar sound of country music has its provenance in the music of Hawaii.

=== Role of East Tennessee ===
The U.S. Congress has formally recognized Bristol, Tennessee, as the "Birthplace of Country Music", based on the historic Bristol recording sessions of 1927. Nashville, Tennessee has also become a common hotspot for many country artists. Historians have also noted the influence of the less-known Johnson City sessions of 1928 and 1929, and the Knoxville sessions of 1929 and 1930. In addition, the Mountain City Fiddlers Convention, held in 1925, helped to inspire modern country music. Before these, pioneer settlers, in the Great Smoky Mountains region, had developed a rich musical heritage.

== Generations ==
=== First generation (1920s) ===
Country music, still known as hillbilly music at the time, gained an increased audience with the invention of the radio in the 1920s. The largest country music radio show was the Grand Ole Opry, aired starting in 1925 by WSM in Nashville and continuing to present day. Okeh Records, a New York City record label began issuing hillbilly records in 1923, eventually followed by Columbia Records in 1924, and RCA Victor Records in 1927. Outside of New York, Atlanta's country music scene was also important launching many early recording artist's career. The steel guitar entered country music as early as 1922, when Jimmie Tarlton met famed Hawaiian guitarist Frank Ferera on the West Coast. Many hillbilly musicians recorded blues songs throughout the 1920s. The first commercial recordings of what was considered instrumental music in the traditional country style were "Arkansas Traveler" and "Turkey in the Straw" by fiddlers Henry Gilliland & A.C. (Eck) Robertson on June 30, 1922, for Victor Records and released in April 1923.

The first commercial recording of what is widely considered to be the first country song featuring vocals and lyrics was Fiddlin' John Carson with "Little Log Cabin in the Lane" for Okeh Records on June 14, 1923. Vernon Dalhart was considered the first country singer to have a nationwide hit in May 1924 with "Wreck of the Old 97." The flip side of the record was "Lonesome Road Blues", was also popularized. In April 1924, "Aunt" Samantha Bumgarner and Eva Davis became the first female musicians to record and release country songs. Many of the early country musicians, such as the yodeler Cliff Carlisle, recorded blues songs into the 1930s. James Gideon "Gid" Tanner, an American old-time fiddler, was one of country music's earliest stars. With his string band, the Skillet Lickers, in the 1920s and 1930s, many early country songs were written and performed.

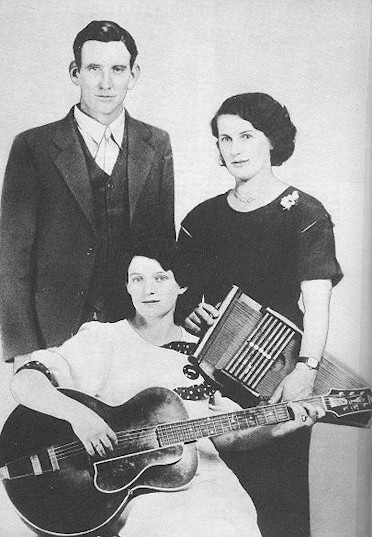
The Carter Family are a dynasty of country music and began with (left to right) A.P. Carter, wife Sara Carter and Maybelle Carter.

Jimmie Rodgers and the Carter Family are widely considered to be important early country musicians. From Scott County, Virginia, the Carters had learned sight reading of hymnals and sheet music using solfege. Their songs were first captured at a historic recording session in Bristol, Tennessee, on August 1, 1927, where Ralph Peer was the talent scout and sound recordist. A scene in the movie O Brother, Where Art Thou? depicts a similar occurrence in the same timeframe. Rodgers fused hillbilly country, gospel, jazz, blues, pop, cowboy, and folk, and many of his best songs were his compositions, including "Blue Yodel", which sold over a million records and established Rodgers as the premier singer of early country music. Beginning in 1927, and for the next 17 years, the Carters recorded some 300 old-time ballads, traditional tunes, country songs and gospel hymns, all representative of America's southeastern folklore and heritage.

=== Second generation (1930s–1940s) ===
Record sales declined during the Great Depression; however, radio became a popular source of entertainment, and "barn dance" shows featuring country music were popularized, beginning in the Southern United States and spreading north to Chicago and west to California. The most important was the Grand Ole Opry, aired starting in 1925 by WSM in Nashville and continuing to the present day. Some of the early stars on the Opry were Uncle Dave Macon, Roy Acuff and African American harmonica player DeFord Bailey.

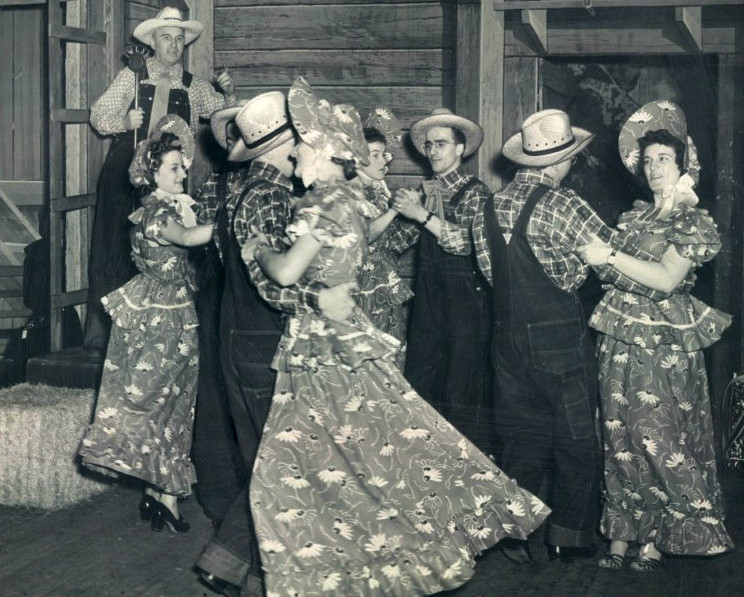
An image from National Barn Dance in 1940

Drums were looked down on by early country musicians as being too loud and not pure for the country sound. By 1935, Bob Wills added drums to his western swing band, Texas Playboys, despite opposition by the country music venue, the Grand Ole Opry. In contrast, Louisiana Hayride, a less conservative country music venue, kept a house drummer backstage as late as 1956. In the 1960s, however, it was rare for a country band not to have a drummer.

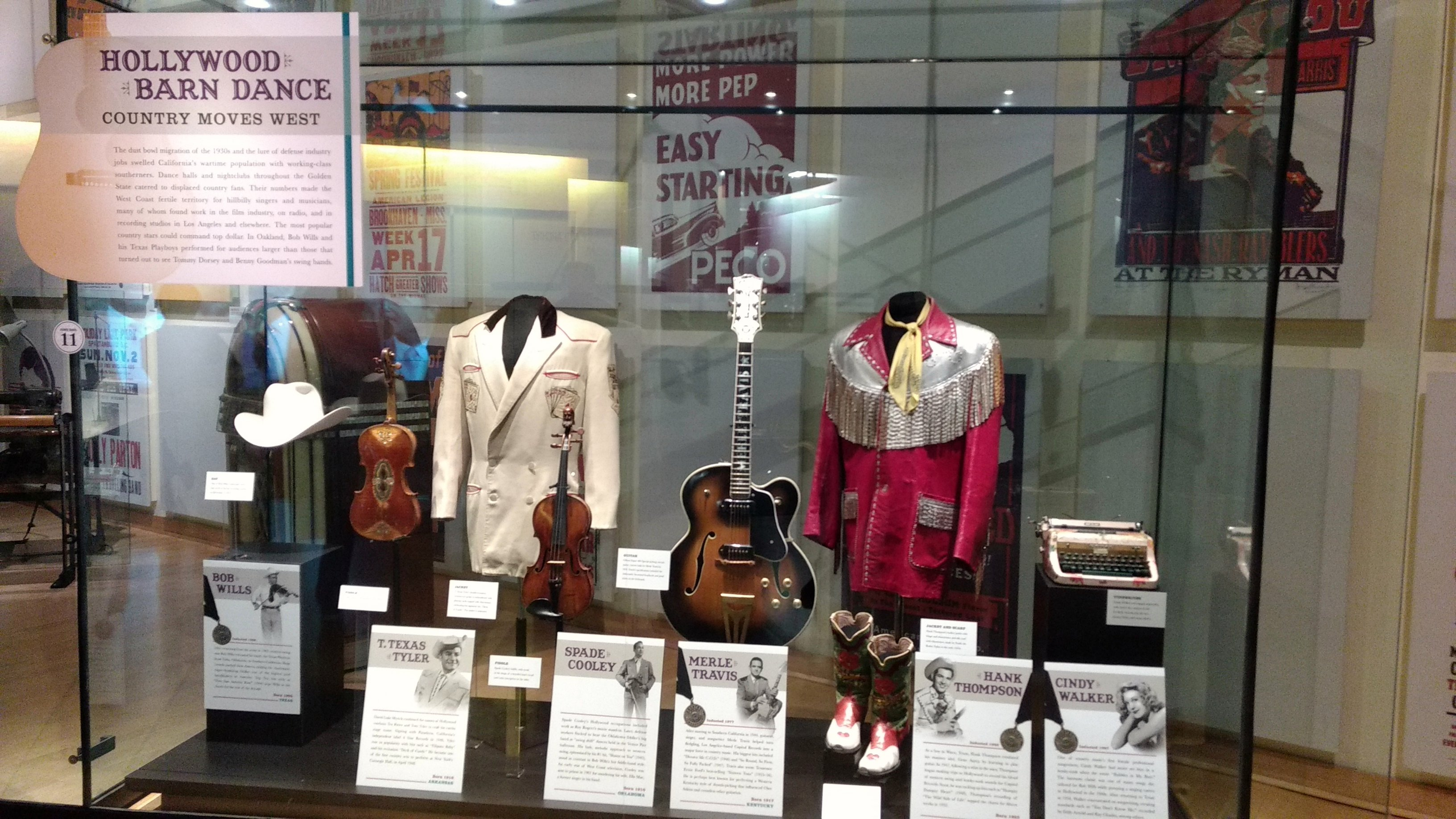
Instruments from Bob Wills and other country musicians at the Country Music Hall of Fame and Museum, 2018

Bob Wills was one of the first country musicians known to have added an electric guitar to his band, in 1938. A decade later (1948) Arthur Smith recorded Guitar Boogie, which crossed over to the US pop charts, introducing many people to the potential of the electric guitar. For several decades Nashville session players preferred the warm tones of the Gibson and Gretsch archtop electrics, but a "hot" Fender style, using guitars which became available beginning in the early 1950s, eventually prevailed as the signature guitar sound of country. In the 1930s and 1940s, cowboy songs, or western music, which had been recorded since the 1920s, were popularized by films made in Hollywood, with popular singing cowboys such as Gene Autry, known as king of the "singing cowboys," the Sons of the Pioneers, and Roy Rogers. Country music and western music were frequently played together on the same radio stations, hence the term country and western music, despite country and western being two distinct genres. Cowgirls contributed to the sound in various family groups, with Patsy Montana opening the door for female artists with "I Want To Be a Cowboy's Sweetheart". Bob Wills developed the subgenre western swing, bringing in more instruments and players. At its height, western swing rivaled the popularity of big band swing music. Country musicians began recording boogie in 1939, shortly after it had been played at Carnegie Hall, when Johnny Barfield recorded "Boogie Woogie". The trickle of what was initially called hillbilly boogie, or okie boogie, became a flood beginning in late 1945, with notable releases like the Delmore Brothers' Freight Train Boogie, part of the evolution toward rockabilly. The hillbilly boogie period lasted into the 1950s and remains one of many subgenres of country into the 21st century. By the end of World War II, "mountaineer" string band music known as bluegrass had emerged when Bill Monroe joined with Lester Flatt and Earl Scruggs, introduced by Roy Acuff at the Grand Ole Opry. Gospel music remained a popular component, with Red Foley having one of the first million-selling gospel hits ("Peace in the Valley") and also singing boogie, blues and rockabilly. In the post-war period, country music was called "folk" in the trades, and "hillbilly" within the industry. In 1944, Billboard replaced the term "hillbilly" with "folk songs and blues," and switched to "country and western" in 1949.

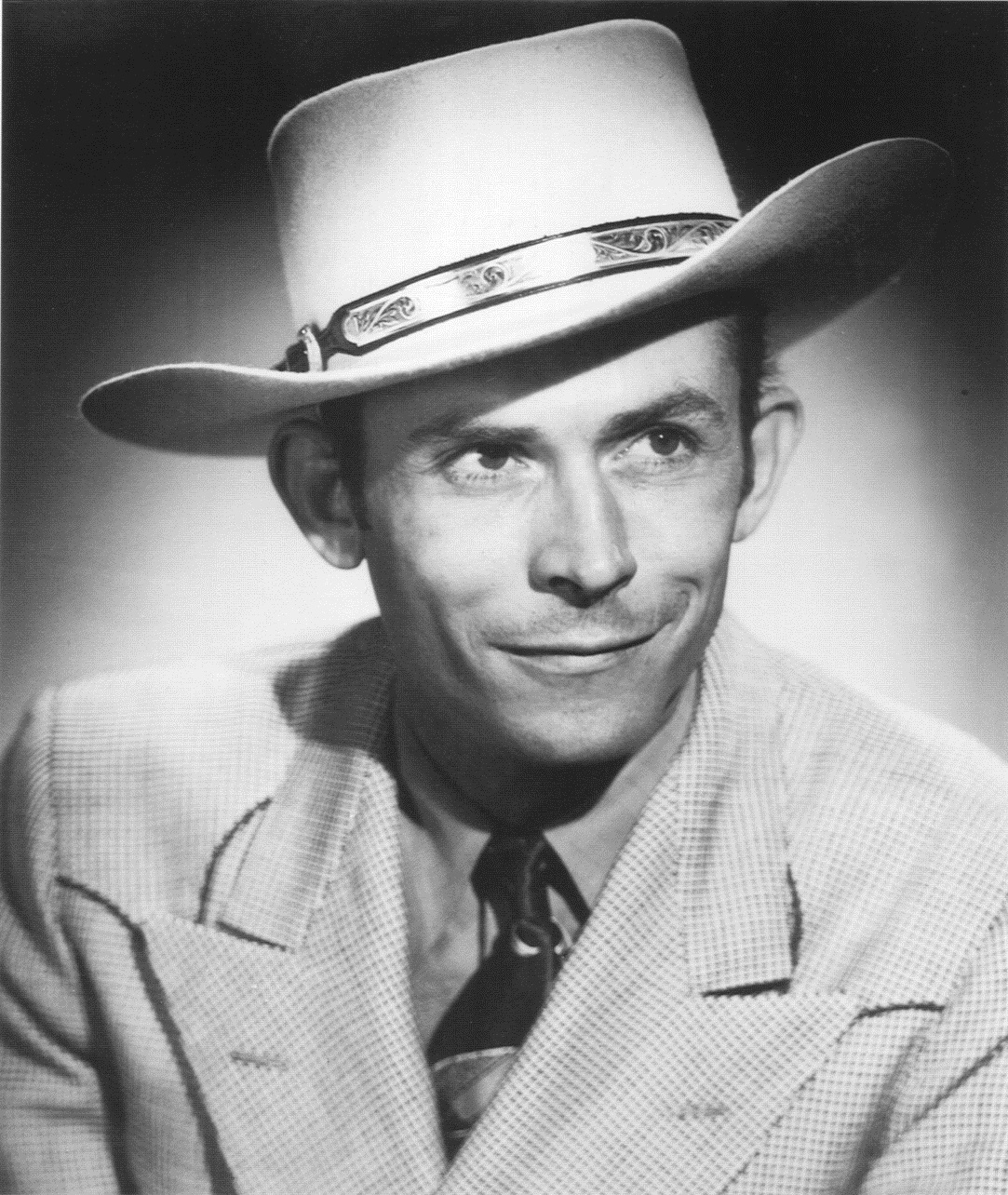
Hank Williams in a 1948 publicity photograph for MGM Records

Another type of stripped-down and raw music with a variety of moods and a basic ensemble of guitar, bass, dobro or steel guitar (and later) drums became popular, especially among rural residents in the three states of Texhomex, those being Texas, Oklahoma, and New Mexico. It became known as honky tonk and had its roots in western swing and the ranchera music of Mexico and the border states, particularly New Mexico and Texas, together with the blues of the American South. Bob Wills and His Texas Playboys personified this music which has been described as:

"a little bit of this, and a little bit of that, a little bit of black and a little bit of white... just loud enough to keep you from thinking too much and to go right on ordering the whiskey."

These honky tonk songs were associated with bar rooms. The music of these artists who began in this type would later be referred to as traditional country. Webb Pierce, a honky-tonk singer, was the top-charting country artist of the 1950s, with 13 of his singles spending 113 weeks at number one.

In 1951, Williams's "Cold, Cold Heart" earned crossover success with Tony Bennett's traditional pop cover version, which introduced Williams's songwriting to mainstream audiences.

=== Third generation (1950s–1960s) ===
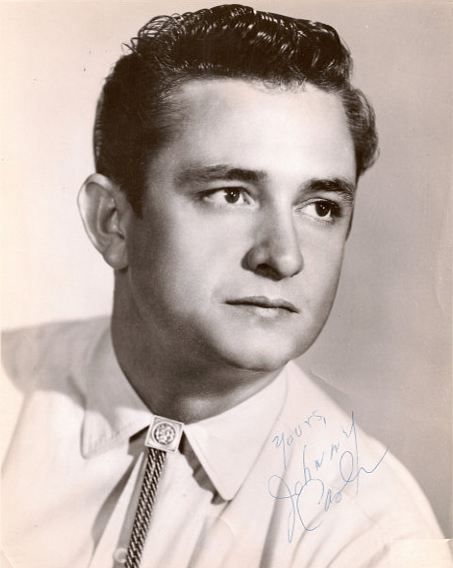
Johnny Cash in a 1955 publicity photograph for Sun Records

The third generation of country music evolved the genre into sub-disciplines like bluegrass, rockabilly, and country rock, while Gospel music remained popular. After World War II, "mountaineer string band" music emerged as bluegrass when Bill Monroe, with Lester Flatt and Earl Scruggs, was introduced by Roy Acuff at the Grand Ole Opry.

By the early 1950s, a blend of western swing, country boogie, and honky tonk was played by most bands, following Gene Autry, Lydia Mendoza, Roy Rogers, and Patsy Montana; the first all-country radio station was established in Lubbock, Texas in 1953, and the Country Music Association was founded in 1958. Native American, Hispano, and American frontier music from the Southwestern United States and Northern Mexico grew popular in poor communities across New Mexico, Oklahoma, and Texas, with basic ensembles featuring classical guitar, bass guitar, dobro or steel guitar, and larger groups adding electric guitars, trumpets, keyboards (especially the honky-tonk piano, a type of tack piano), banjos, and drums. The 1960s marked a transition, with traditional country dominant but innovative acts like Loretta Lynn's feminist lens and Johnny Cash's prison concerts pushing boundaries. Western music continued influencing country, though folk revival and folk rock had little impact due to political contrasts with country's conservative audience.

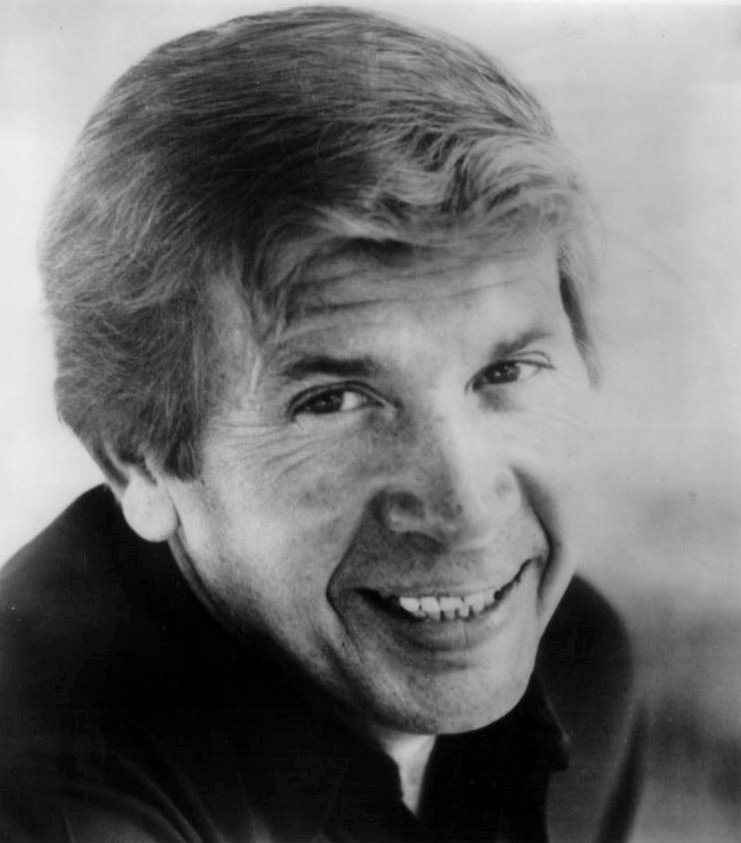
Buck Owens in 1977

Rock and roll's rise with blended with country to form rockabilly, boosted by producers like Sam Phillips at Sun Records in Memphis, launching Elvis Presley, Jerry Lee Lewis, Carl Perkins, Roy Orbison, and Johnny Cash; Norman Petty in Clovis, New Mexico, for Buddy Holly; and Bob Keane at Del-Fi Records for Ritchie Valens. Petty's studio also hosted early sessions for Hank Williams Jr., who fused rock with country, and Al Hurricane, blending country, rock, and New Mexico music on Gene Autry's Challenge Records label. Country gained TV exposure via Ozark Jubilee on ABC from 1955 to 1960 in Springfield, Missouri. 1956 was rockabilly's peak, with hits like Presley's "Heartbreak Hotel", Cash's "I Walk the Line", and Perkins' "Blue Suede Shoes"; former yodeler Bill Haley repurposed his band for rockabilly successes like "Rock Around the Clock". The Bakersfield sound grew from hardcore honky tonk and western swing among Dust Bowl migrants in Bakersfield, California, relying on electric instruments like the Telecaster; leading artists included Buck Owens, Merle Haggard, Tommy Collins, Dwight Yoakam, Gary Allan, and Wynn Stewart. Ken Nelson produced trucking songs like Haggard's White Line Fever and asked Red Simpson to record an album in the subgenre. In 1962, Ray Charles topped charts with his country album Modern Sounds in Country and Western Music, creating country soul.

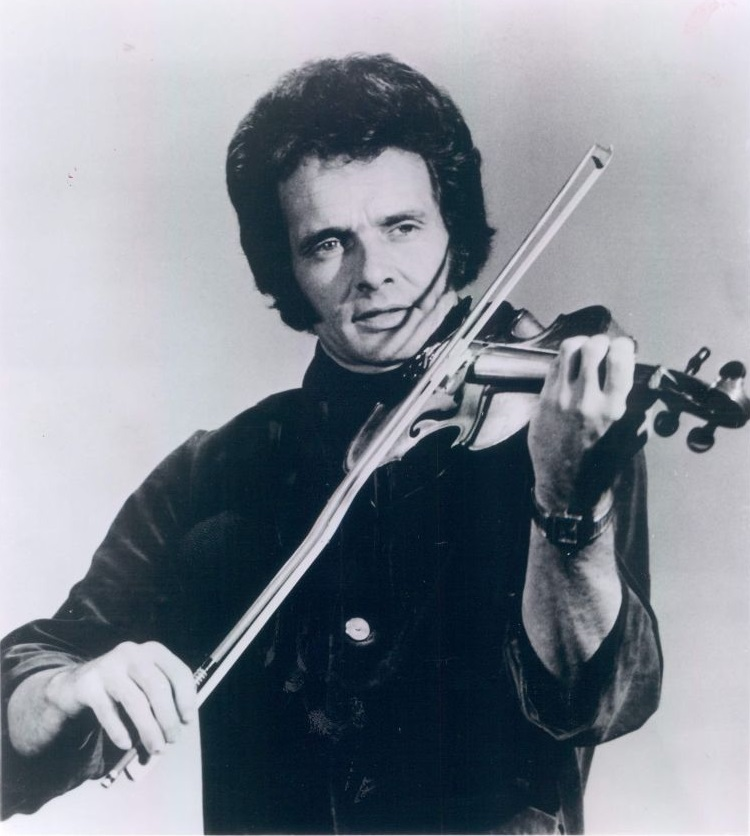
Merle Haggard in a 1975 publicity photograph for Capitol Records

The Nashville sound, peaking in the early 1960s under producers like Chet Atkins, Owen Bradley, and Billy Sherrill, turned country into a multimillion-dollar industry in Nashville, Tennessee, borrowing pop stylings with smooth vocals, strings, and "licks"; key artists included Jim Reeves, Patsy Cline, and Eddy Arnold. The "slip note" piano of Floyd Cramer was central. It collapsed in 1964 amid rock's rise and the plane crash deaths of Reeves and Cline, evolving into countrypolitan for mainstream markets through the early 1970s. From the 1950s to mid-1960s, western singer-songwriters Marty Robbins and Michael Martin Murphey gained prominence. By the late 1960s, a traditionalist backlash to the British Invasion—exemplified by the Byrds' negative Opry reception, mixed with rock's "old values" and declining Nashville interest to create country rock. The scene was dominated by western influences, leading to "country and western" labeling; fashion like cowboy hats persisted, alongside subgenres like Red Dirt in Oklahoma, New Mexico music in New Mexico, and Texas country/Tejano music in Texas.

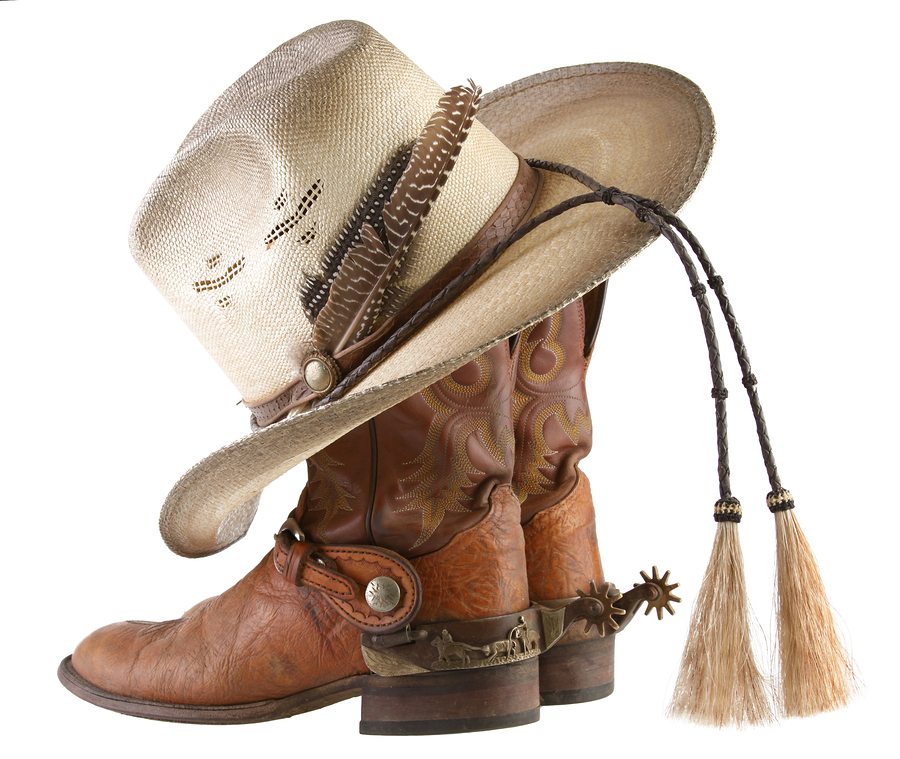
Cowboy hat and cowboy boots, associated with country music artists

Western wear shirt design, with snap fasteners

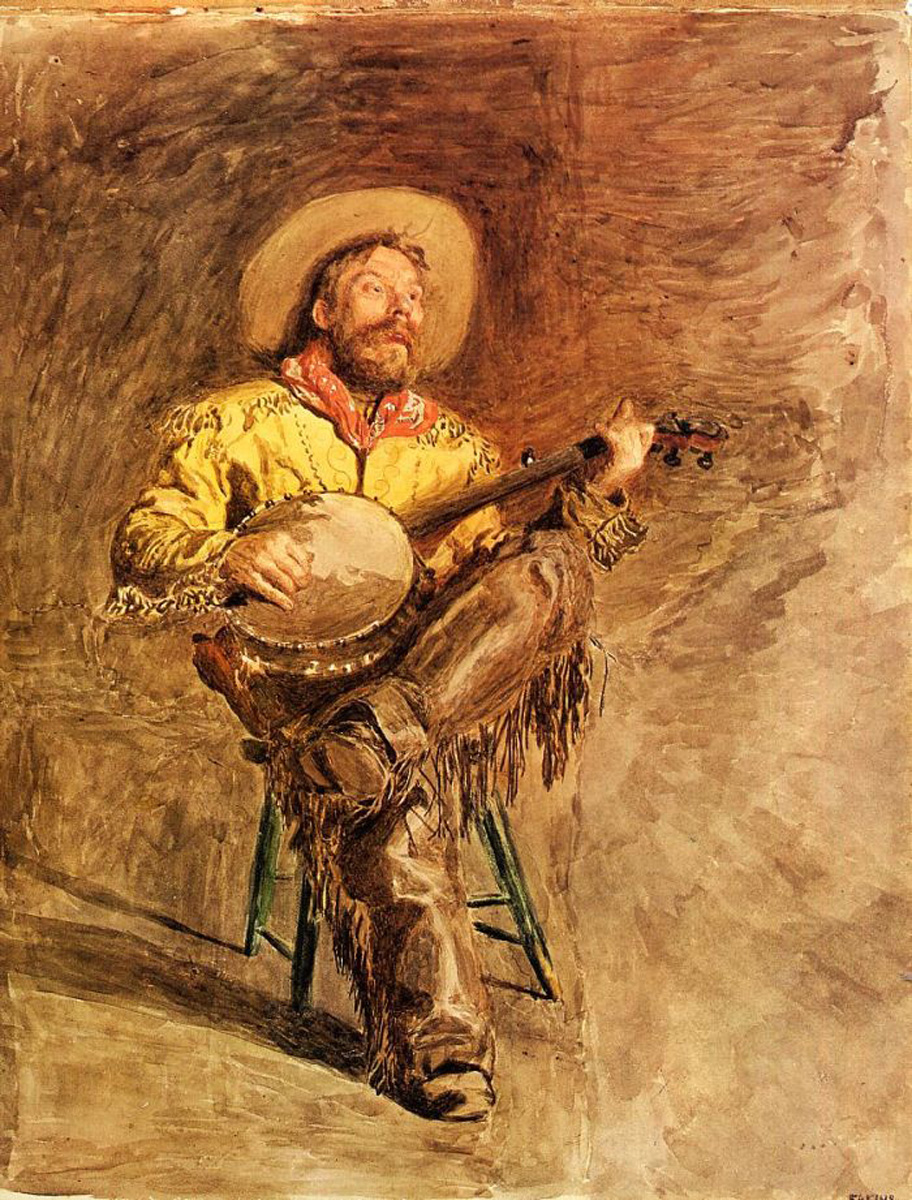
Painting of a cowboy singing by Thomas Eakins (1890)

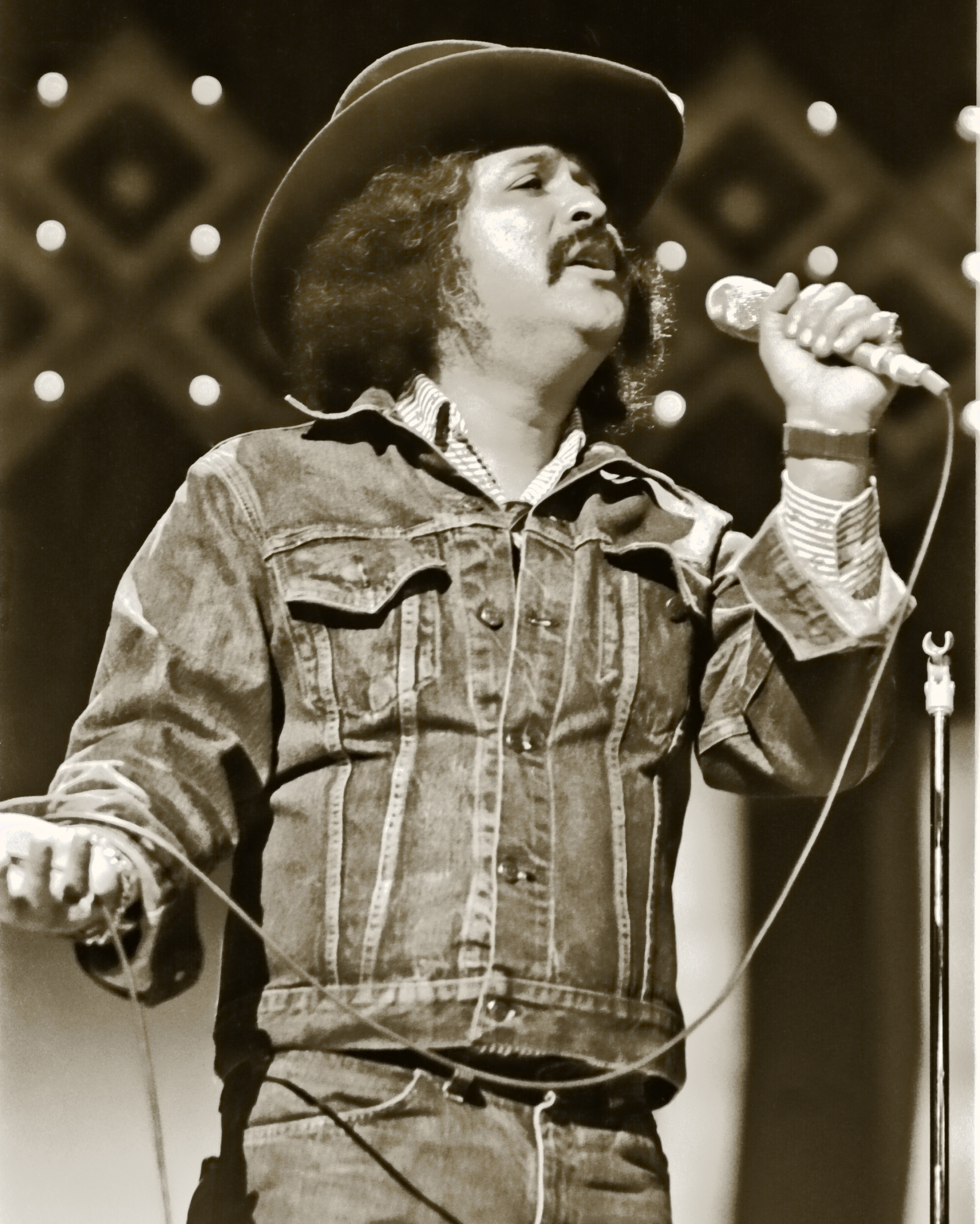
Freddy Fender performing Tejano music in Nashville (1977)

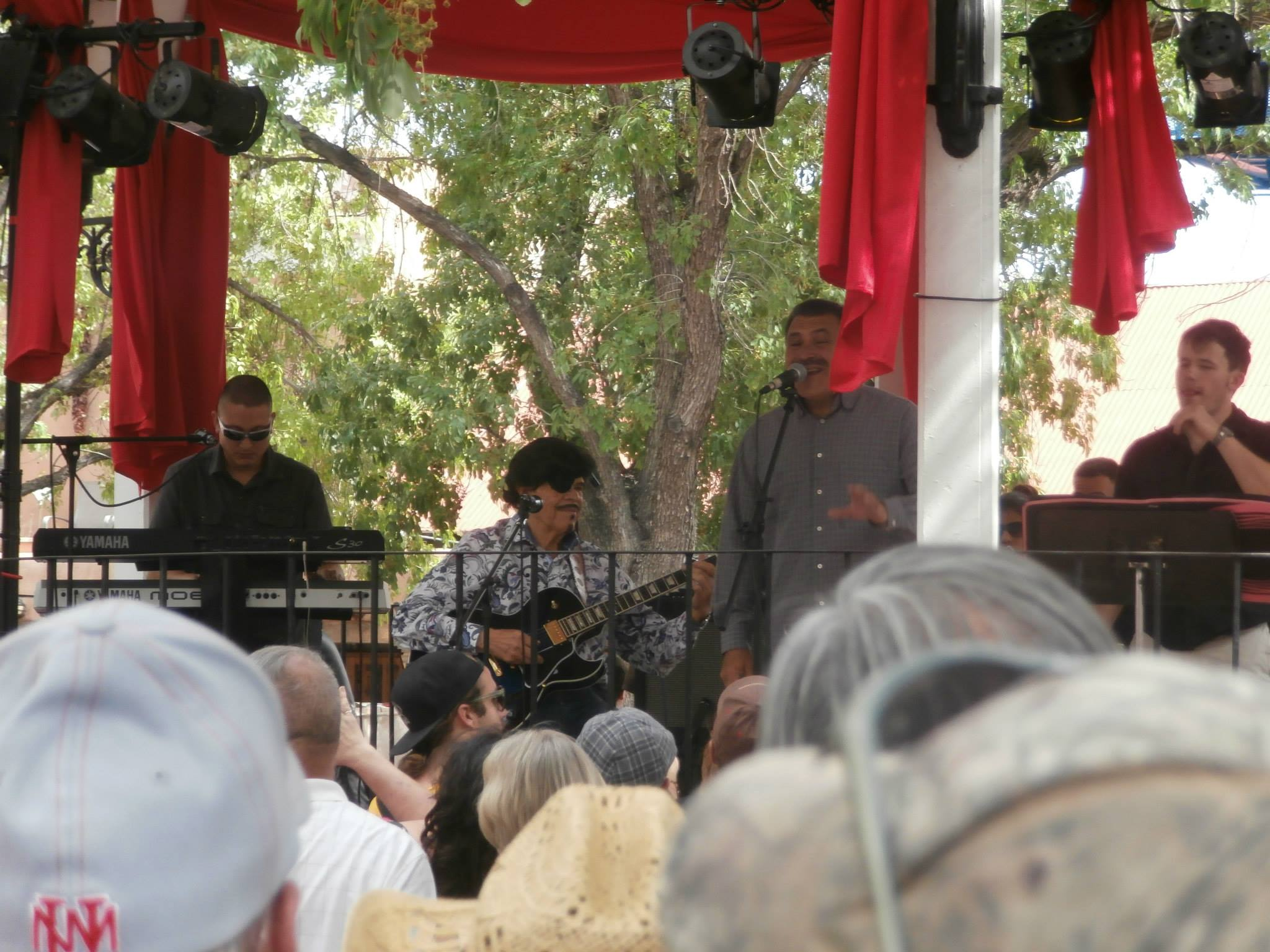
Al Hurricane and Jr. performing New Mexico music at a fiesta in Old Town Albuquerque (2014)

=== Fourth generation (1970s–1980s) ===
Waylon Jennings (left) and Willie Nelson (right) in 1977

Outlaw country emerged in the late 1950s and 1960s from traditional Western music styles like Red Dirt, New Mexico, Texas country, Tejano, and honky-tonk, with lyrics capturing anger and alienation from personal or economic struggles. Originating in the bars and honky-tonks of Oklahoma, New Mexico, and Texas, it was shaped by artists like Johnny Cash with his 1963 hit "Ring of Fire," and driven by figures like Willie Nelson, Waylon Jennings, Jerry Jeff Walker, Hank Williams, Jr., Merle Haggard, and Joe Ely. The outlaw movement revolutionized country music in the early 1970s, epitomized in the 1976 album Wanted! The Outlaws, and its influence persisted into the 1980s through supergroups like The Highwaymen, Bandido, and Texas Tornados, shaping modern alternative country within country pop. Between 1972 and 1975 singer and guitarist John Denver released a series of successful songs both with country and folk-rock musical styles. By the mid-1970s, Texas country and Tejano music gained popularity with performers like Freddie Fender.

"After I left Nashville (the early 70s), I wanted to relax and play the music that I wanted to play, and just stay around Texas, maybe Oklahoma. Waylon and I had that outlaw image going, and when it caught on at colleges and we started selling records, we were O.K. The whole outlaw thing, it had nothing to do with the music, it was something that got written in an article, and the young people said, 'Well, that's pretty cool.' And started listening." - Willie Nelson

Country pop or soft pop, with roots in the countrypolitan sound, folk music, and soft rock, first emerged in the 1970s, starting with pop music singers like Glen Campbell, Bobbie Gentry, John Denver, Olivia Newton-John, Anne Murray, B. J. Thomas, the Bellamy Brothers, and Linda Ronstadt having hits on the country charts.

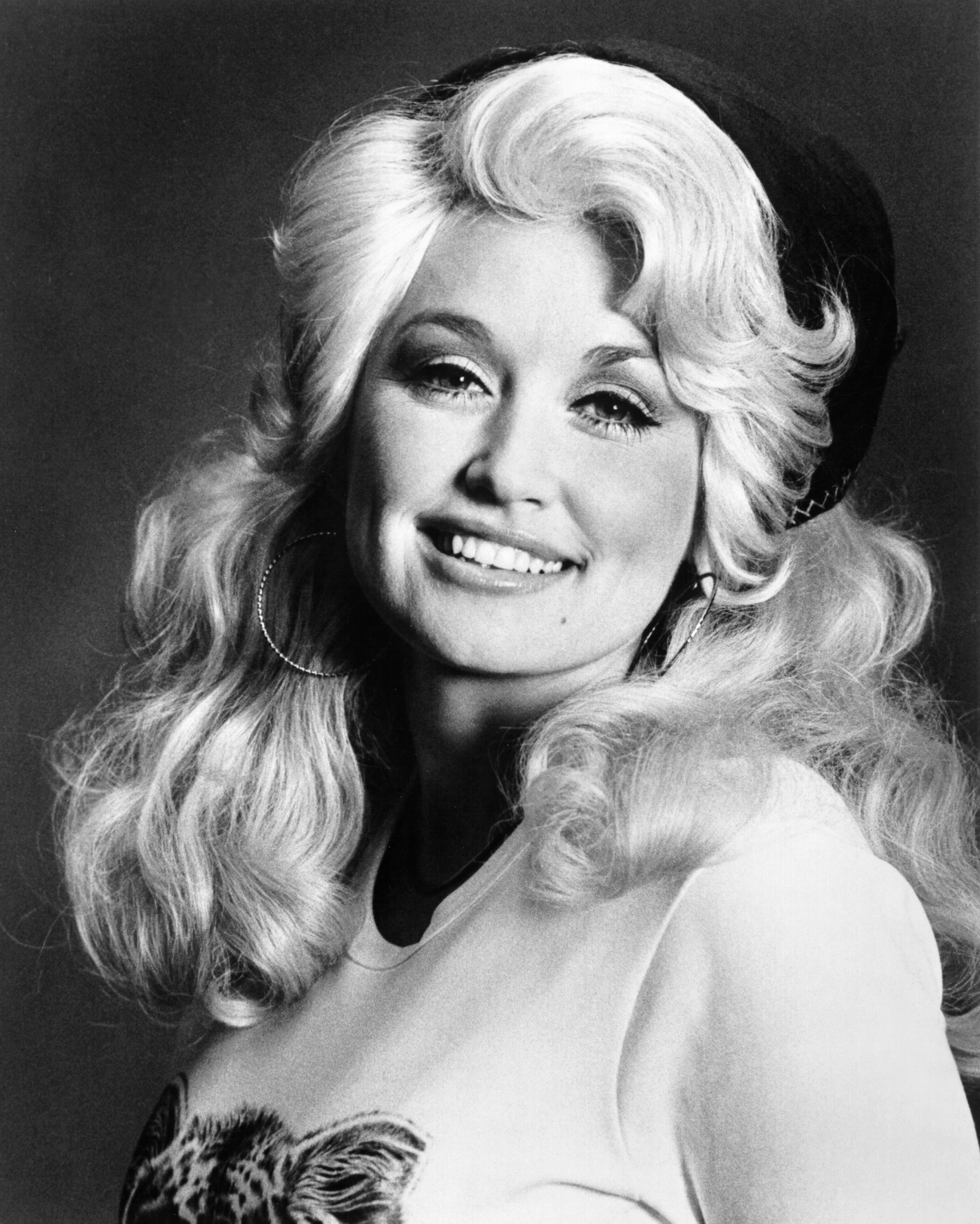
Dolly Parton in a 1977 press photo for RCA Nashville

During the mid-1970s, Dolly Parton, a successful mainstream country artist since the late 1960s, mounted a high-profile campaign to cross over to pop music, culminating in her 1977 hit "Here You Come Again", which topped the U.S. country singles chart, and also reached No. 3 on the pop singles charts. Parton's male counterpart, Kenny Rogers, came from the opposite direction, aiming his music at the country charts, after a successful career in pop, rock and folk music with the First Edition. He achieved success with "Lucille", topping reaching No. 5 on the U.S. pop singles charts, and No. 1 on the British all-genre chart, as well as the country classic "The Gambler". In 1975, author Paul Hemphill stated in the Saturday Evening Post,

"Country music isn't really country anymore; it is a hybrid of nearly every form of popular music in America."

During the early 1980s, country artists continued to see their records perform well on the pop charts, despite some pushback from some more established artists in the industry. Many artists moved to produce country pop, a sound that had more intensive production and received radio airtime, in favor of more traditional or acoustic productions. Described by AllMusic as the "father of country-rock", Gram Parsons' work in the early 1970s was acclaimed for its purity and for his appreciation for aspects of traditional country music. Subsequent to the initial blending of the two polar opposite genres, other offspring soon resulted, including Southern rock, heartland rock and in more recent years, alternative country. In 1980, a style of "neocountry disco music" was popularized by the film Urban Cowboy. It was during this time that a glut of pop-country crossover artists began appearing on the country charts. Sales in record stores rocketed to $250 million in 1981; by 1984, 900 radio stations began programming country or neocountry pop full-time. As with most sudden trends, however, by 1984 sales had dropped below 1979 figures. The music of the 1960s and 1970s targeted the American working class, and truckers in particular. A fusion of honky-tonk, country rock and the Bakersfield sound, truck driving music has the tempo of country rock and the emotion of honky-tonk, and its lyrics focus on a truck driver's lifestyle. As country radio became more popular, trucking songs like the 1963 hit song Six Days on the Road by Dave Dudley rose in popularity. The song was written by actual truckers and contained numerous references to the trucker culture of the time like "ICC" for Interstate Commerce Commission and "little white pills" as a reference to amphetamines.

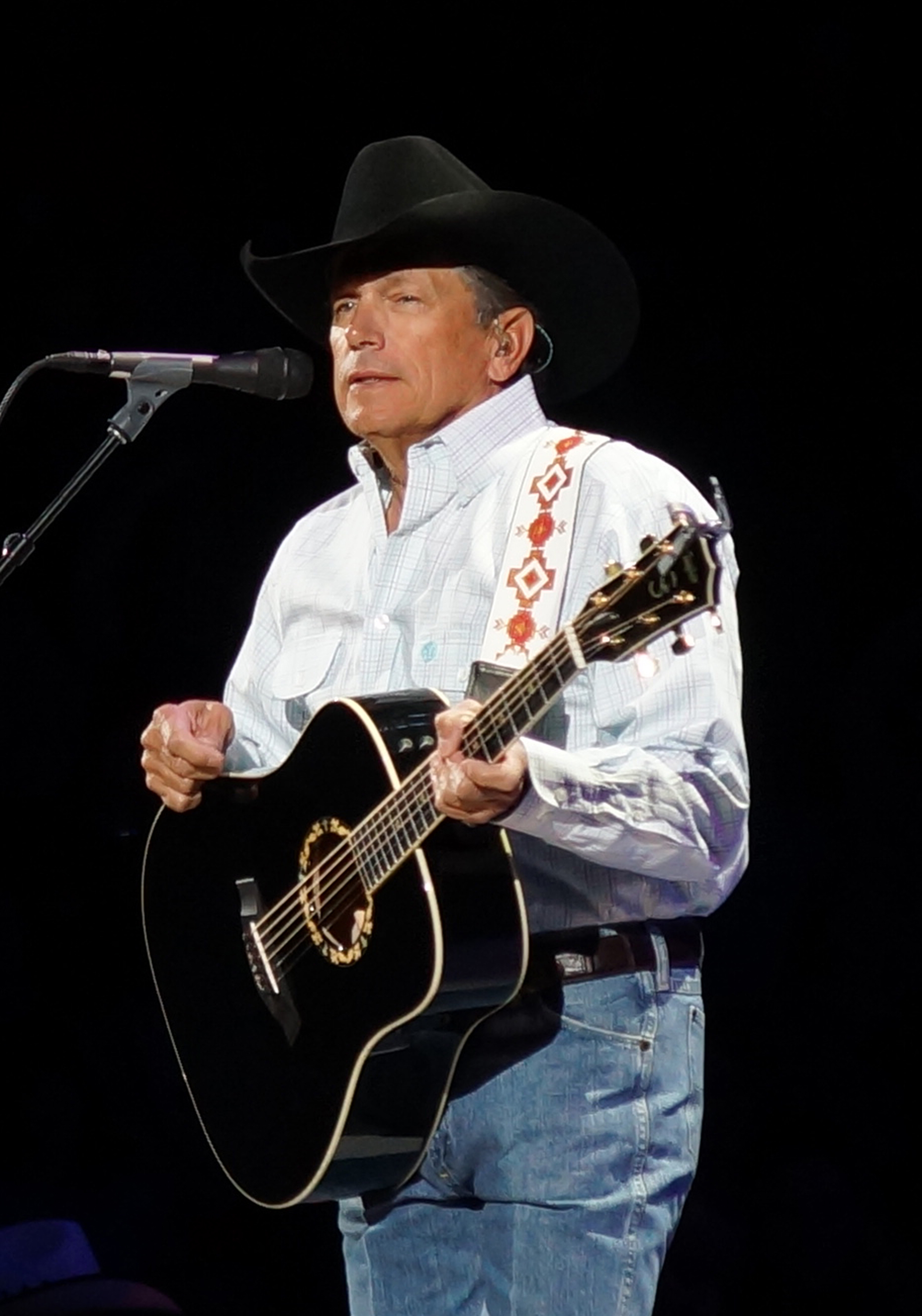
George Strait in 2014

During the mid-1980s, a group of new artists began to emerge who rejected the more polished country-pop sound that had been prominent on radio and the charts, in favor of more, traditional, "back-to-basics" production. The so-called "Class of '81", Ricky Skaggs, George Strait, and Reba McEntire, began a long string of hits that revisited a traditional sound. Many of the artists during the latter half of the 1980s drew on traditional honky-tonk, bluegrass, folk and western swing.

=== Fifth generation (1990s–2000s) ===
Country music was aided by the U.S. Federal Communications Commission's (FCC) Docket 80–90, which led to a significant expansion of FM radio in the 1980s by adding numerous higher-fidelity FM signals to rural and suburban areas. At this point, country music was mainly heard on rural AM radio stations; the expansion of FM was particularly helpful to country music, which migrated to FM from the AM band as AM became overcome by talk radio (the country music stations that stayed on AM developed the classic country format for the AM audience). At the same time, beautiful music stations already in rural areas began abandoning the format (leading to its effective demise) to adopt country music as well. This wider availability of country music led to producers seeking to polish their product for a wider audience. In 1990, Billboard, which had published a country music chart since the 1940s, changed the methodology it used to compile the chart: singles sales were removed from the methodology, and only airplay on country radio determined a song's place on the chart.

In the 1990s, country music became a worldwide phenomenon thanks to Garth Brooks, who enjoyed one of the most successful careers in popular music history, breaking records for both sales and concert attendance throughout the decade. He attracted fans with his fusion of neotraditionalist country and stadium rock. George Strait, whose career began in the 1980s, also continued to have widespread success in this decade and beyond. Toby Keith began his career as a more pop-oriented country singer in the 1990s, evolving into an outlaw persona in the early 2000s with Pull My Chain and its follow-up, Unleashed.

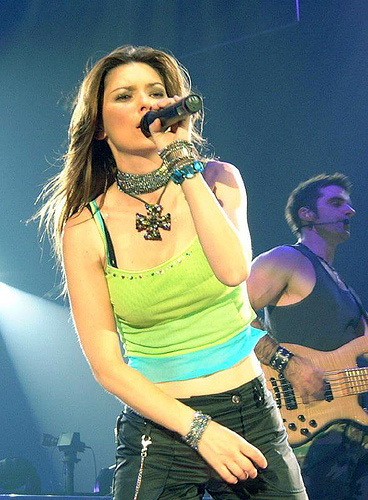
Shania Twain performing during her Up! Tour in 2004

Female artists such as Reba McEntire, Patty Loveless, Faith Hill, Martina McBride, Deana Carter, LeAnn Rimes, Mindy McCready, Pam Tillis, Lorrie Morgan, Shania Twain, and Mary Chapin Carpenter all released platinum-selling albums in the 1990s. The Dixie Chicks became one of the most popular country bands in the 1990s and early 2000s. Their 1998 debut album Wide Open Spaces went on to become certified 12 times platinum while their 1999 album Fly went on to become 10 times platinum. Canadian artist Shania Twain became the best selling female country artist of 1990s. Her 1997 album, Come On Over, became a worldwide phenomenon one of the world's best selling albums for three years (1998, 1999 and 2000). Twain has been credited with breaking international boundaries for country music, as well as inspiring many country artists to incorporate different genres into their music in order to attract a wider audience.

In the early-mid-1990s, country western music was influenced by the popularity of line dancing. This influence was so great that Chet Atkins was quoted as saying, "The music has gotten pretty bad, I think. It's all that damn line dancing." By the end of the decade, however, at least one line dance choreographer complained that good country line dance music was no longer being released. In contrast, artists such as Don Williams and George Jones who had more or less had consistent chart success through the 1970s and 1980s suddenly had their fortunes fall rapidly around 1991 when the new chart rules took effect. Country influences combined with Punk rock and alternative rock to forge the "cowpunk" scene in Southern California during the 1980s, which included bands such as the Long Ryders, Lone Justice and the Beat Farmers, as well as the established punk group X, whose music had begun to include country and rockabilly influences. Simultaneously, a generation of diverse country artists outside of California emerged that rejected the perceived cultural and musical conservatism associated with Nashville's mainstream country musicians in favor of more countercultural outlaw country and the folk singer-songwriter traditions of artists such as Woody Guthrie, Gram Parsons and Bob Dylan. Steve Earle, in particular, had both country and college rock audiences. In 1986, he opened for both country singer Dwight Yoakam and alt-rock band, the Replacements. Yoakam also cultivated a fanbase spanning multiple genres through his stripped-down honky-tonk influenced sound and performances at Los Angeles punk rock clubs. These early styles merged around 1990, when Uncle Tupelo released an influential debut album No Depression. The album is widely credited as being the first alt-country album, and inspired the name of No Depression magazine, which principally covered the new genre. Darius Rucker, frontman for the 1990s pop-rock band Hootie & the Blowfish, began a country solo career in the late 2000s, one that to date has produced five albums and several hits on both the country charts and the Billboard Hot 100. Singer-songwriter Unknown Hinson became famous for his appearance in the Charlotte television show Wild, Wild, South, after which Hinson started his own band and toured in southern states. Other rock stars who featured a country song on their albums were Don Henley (who released Cass County in 2015) and Poison.

=== Sixth generation (2010s–present) ===
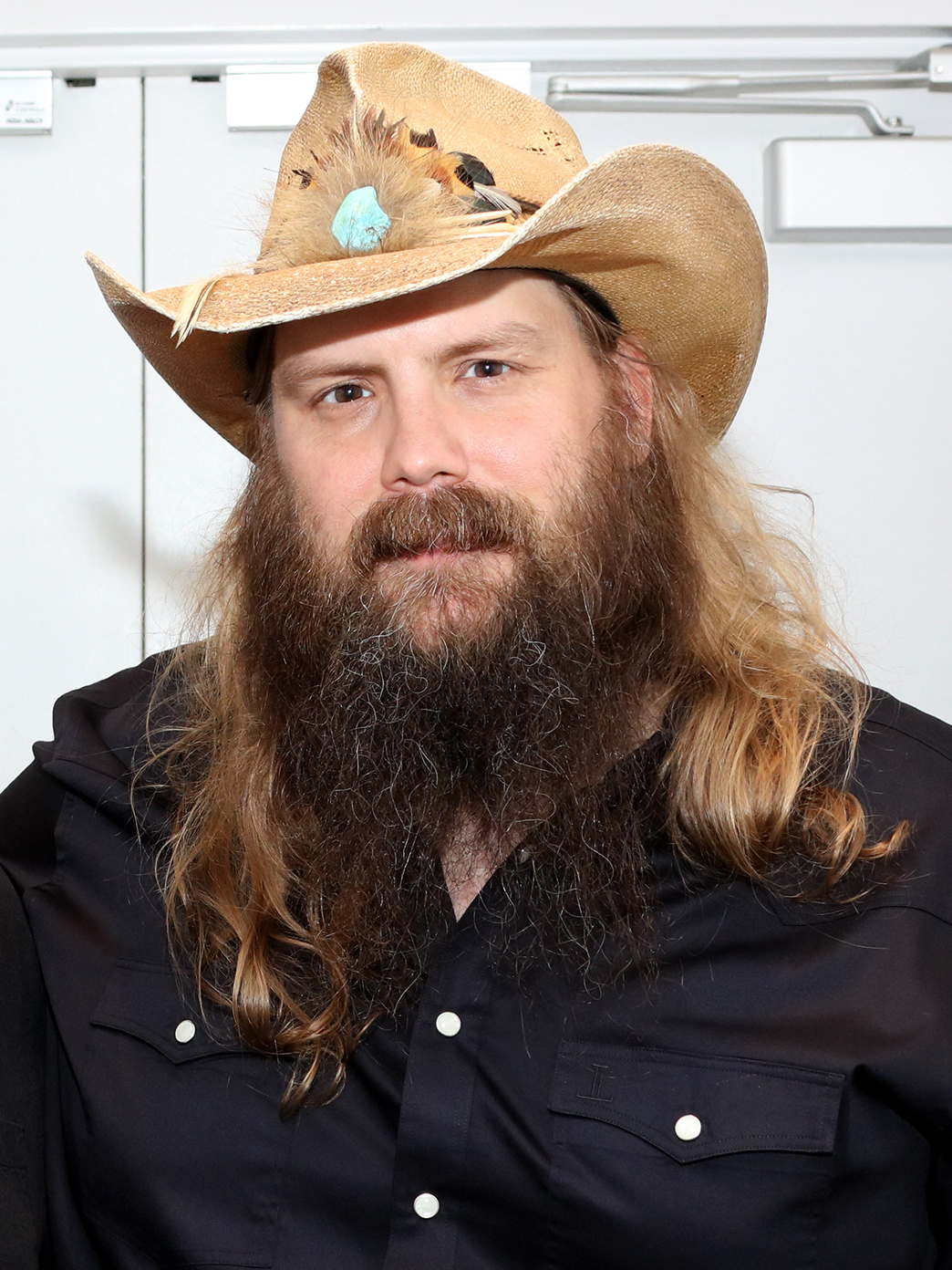
Chris Stapleton in 2019

In the 2010s, the alt-country genre saw an increase in its critical and commercial popularity, owing to the success of artists such as the Civil Wars, Chris Stapleton, Sturgill Simpson, Jason Isbell, Lydia Loveless, and Margo Price. In 2019, Kacey Musgraves – a country artist who had gained a following with indie rock fans – won the Grammy Award for Album of the Year for her album Golden Hour. One of the most commercially successful country artists of the late 2000s and early 2010s has been singer-songwriter Taylor Swift. Swift first became widely known in 2006 when her debut single, "Tim McGraw," later released from her self-titled debut studio album, spent 275 weeks on Billboard 200, one of the longest runs of any album on that chart. At the 2010 Grammys, Swift won Album of the Year for Fearless. Most recently, she has focused on a country sound, in her recent folk-inspired releases, Folklore (2020) and Evermore (2020), now transitioning to mainstream pop. Before Swift, in 2005, country singer Carrie Underwood rose to fame as the winner of the fourth season of American Idol; now holding seven Grammy Awards. With her first single, "Inside Your Heaven", Underwood became the only solo country artist to have a number 1 hit on the Billboard Hot 100 chart in the 2000–2009 decade and also broke Billboard chart history as the first country music artist ever to debut at No. 1 on the Hot 100. In 2007, Underwood won the Grammy Award for Best New Artist, becoming the second country artist to win the award. Another key voice of this generation is singer Kacey Musgraves, who released Golden Hour, winning the 61st Annual Grammy Awards, Academy of Country Music Awards, and Country Music Association Awards, although the album has received criticism from some traditional country music fans. In 2010, the group Lady Antebellum won five Grammys, including the coveted Song of the Year and Record of the Year for "Need You Now". A large number of duos and vocal groups emerged on the charts in the 2010s, many of which feature close harmony in the lead vocals. In addition to Lady A, groups such as Little Big Town, the Band Perry, Gloriana, Thompson Square, Eli Young Band, Zac Brown Band and British duo the Shires have emerged to occupy a large share of mainstream success alongside solo singers such as Kacey Musgraves and Miranda Lambert.

In the mid to late 2010s, country and pop music fused more closely, gaining in popularity with mainstream audiences. The singers who are part of this country movement are also defined as "Nashville's new generation of country". In a broadening of the rhetorical style and coverage of themes in country music, some of these artists have explored feminism, racism, and religion. Some touched on more controversial issues, such as acceptance of the LGBT community, safe sex, recreational marijuana use, and questioning religious sentiment. In 2024, Beyoncé released a country album, Cowboy Carter, to popular acclaim, featuring original songs such as Texas Hold 'Em and a cover of Dolly Parton's Jolene. The genre continues to evolve and attract new influences. The influence of rock music in country has become more overt during the late 2000s and early 2010s. Hip-hop also made its mark on country music with the emergence of country rap. In addition to the emergence of many fusion genres and the continual growth in the country pop sound and country subgenres crossed into rock, alternative and folk, the themes discussed in country music broadened. While many artists still discussed the traditional and conservative values of rural life, working class issues steered towards urban and service work, with acts such as Dougie Poole. Female acts in country music also grew rapidly, with a broadening of thematic topics, such as women's rights, being discussed by major stars, such as Kacey Musgraves.

The country rap sound was brought into the mainstream by southern rappers, with a trap style of production, and country music artists. Nelly and Tim McGraw's "Over and Over" debuted in 2004. In 2003, BubbaSparxxx's debut album, which was self-described as southern trap, was released. This style of music features rap lyrics over country instrumentation, as well as hip-hop production elements. Lil Nas X's song "Old Town Road" spent 19 weeks atop the US Billboard Hot 100 chart, becoming the longest-running number-one song since the chart debuted in 1958, winning Billboard Music Awards, MTV Video Music Awards and a Grammy Award. Sam Hunt's "Leave the Night On" peaked concurrently on the Hot Country Songs and Country Airplay charts, making Hunt the first country artist in 22 years, since Billy Ray Cyrus, to reach the top of three country charts simultaneously in the Nielsen SoundScan-era. With the fusion genre of "country trap"—a fusion of country/western themes to a hip-hop beat, but usually with fully sung lyrics—emerging in the late 2010s, line dancing country had a minor revival; examples of the phenomenon include "The Git Up" by Blanco Brown. Blanco Brown has gone on to make more traditional country soul songs such as "I Need Love" and a rendition of "Don't Take the Girl" with Tim McGraw, and collaborations like "Just the Way" with Parmalee. Another country trap artist known as Breland has seen success with "My Truck", "Throw It Back" with Keith Urban, and "Praise the Lord" featuring Thomas Rhett. Emo rap musician Sueco released a cowpunk song in collaboration with country musician Warren Zeiders titled "Ride It Hard".

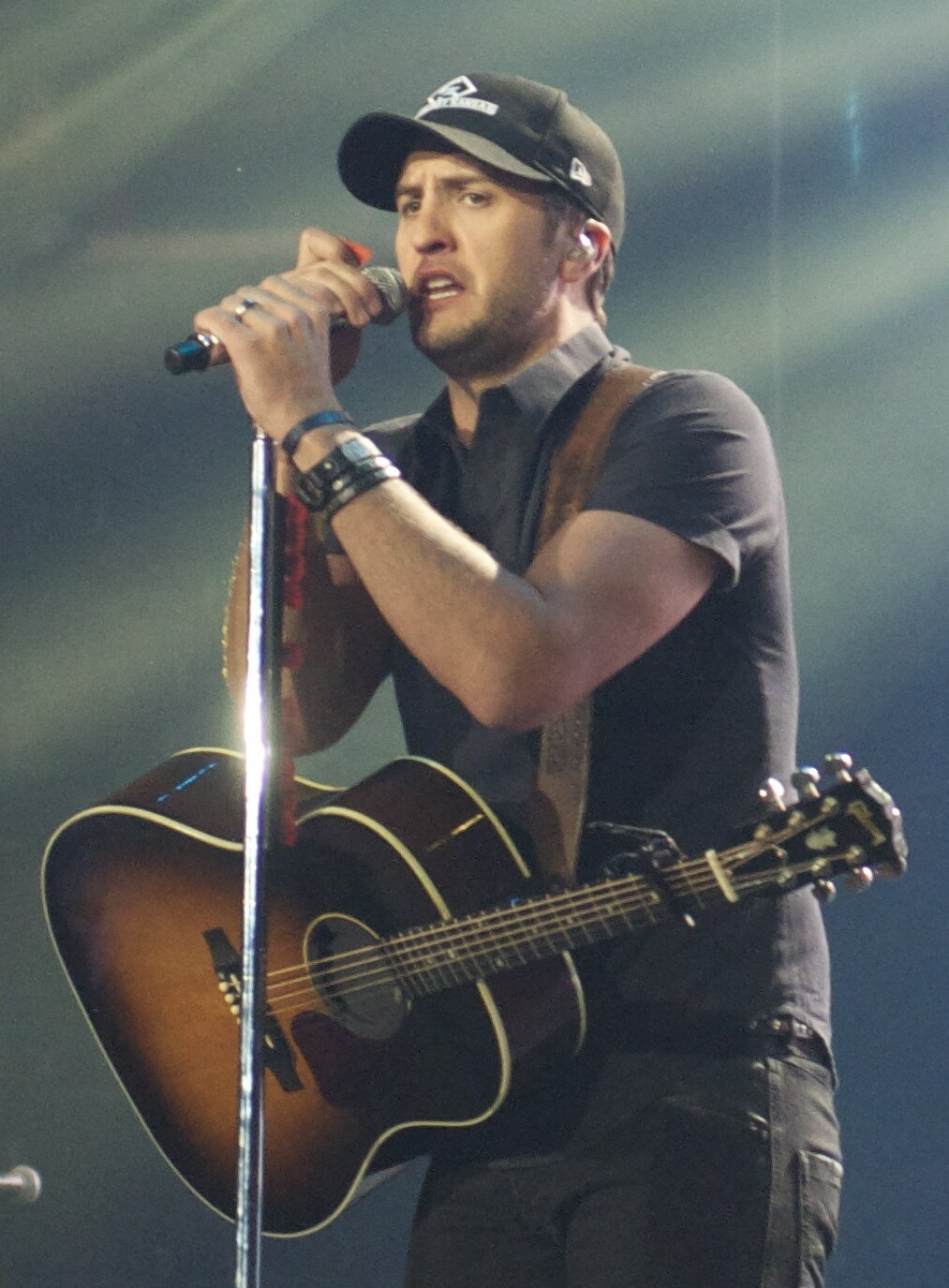
Luke Bryan in 2014

In the early 2010s, "bro-country", a genre noted primarily for its themes on drinking and partying, girls, and pickup trucks became particularly popular. Artists associated with this genre are Luke Bryan, Jason Aldean, Blake Shelton, Jake Owen and Florida Georgia Line whose song "Cruise" became the best-selling country song of all time. Research in the mid-2010s suggested that about 45 percent of country's best-selling songs could be considered bro-country, with the top two artists being Luke Bryan and Florida Georgia Line.

Albums by bro-country singers also sold very well—in 2013, Luke Bryan's Crash My Party was the third best-selling of all albums in the United States, with Florida Georgia Line's Here's to the Good Times at sixth, and Blake Shelton's Based on a True Story at ninth. It is also thought that the popularity of bro-country helped country music to surpass classic rock as the most popular genre in the American country in 2012. The genre however is controversial as it has been criticized by other country musicians and commentators over its themes and depiction of women, opening up a divide between the older generation of country singers and the younger bro country singers that was described as "civil war" by musicians, critics, and journalists."

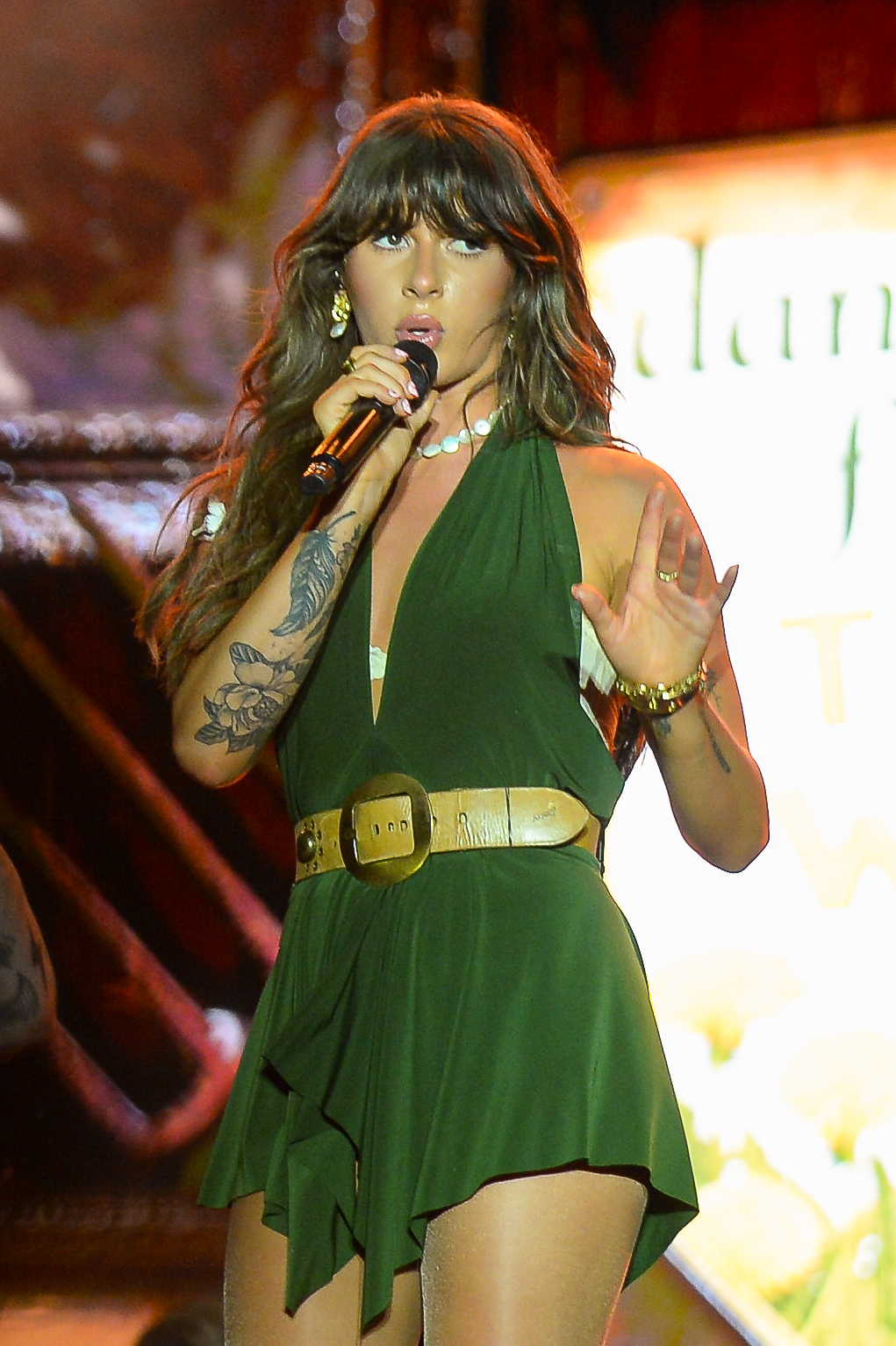
Ella Langley in 2026

In 2014, Maddie & Tae's "Girl in a Country Song", addressing many of the controversial bro-country themes, peaked at number one on the Billboard Country Airplay chart. In the latter part of the 2010s, an increasing number of mainstream country acts collaborated with pop, electronic, and R&B artists; many of these songs achieved commercial success. Examples include a collaboration between Kane Brown and Marshmello and Maren Morris and Zedd, the latter of both duos being electronic music artists. Maren Morris' successful collaboration "The Middle" with EDM producer Zedd is considered to be one representation of the fusion of electro-pop with country music. In the 2020s, the uptick in country music's popularity has resulted in more songs in this genre reaching number one on the Billboard Hot 100, including Morgan Wallen's "Last Night", Jason Aldean's "Try That in a Small Town" and Ella Langley's "Choosin' Texas". Currently, Morgan Wallen is the traditional country artist with the most Billboard Hot 100 chart toppers, with four.

== Regional styles of country music ==
=== International reception of American country music ===
Tom Roland, from Country Music Association International, explains country music's global popularity:

"Country Music listeners around the globe have something in common with those in the United States. In Germany, for instance, Rohrbach identifies three general groups that gravitate to the genre: people intrigued with the US cowboy icon, middle-aged fans who seek an alternative to harder rock music and younger listeners drawn to the pop-influenced sound that underscores many current Country hits."

One of the first US people to perform country music abroad was George Hamilton IV. He was the first country musician to perform in the Soviet Union. He was deemed the "International Ambassador of Country Music" for his contributions to the globalization of country music. Johnny Cash, Emmylou Harris, Keith Urban, and Dwight Yoakam have also made numerous international tours. The Country Music Association undertakes various initiatives to promote country music internationally.

=== Bluegrass and Americana ===
Bluegrass is a genre that contain songs about going through hard times, country loving, and telling stories. Its history can be traced back to the 1600s. During this time, many people were coming to America from Ireland, Scotland and England. Bill Monroe, known as the father of bluegrass, was popularized much earlier than the fifth generation, although he served as an inspiration for newer artists.

Americana music started to re-emerge in the mainstream, although the roots of the genre are traced to Hank Williams in the 1950s. Americana music incorporates elements of country music, bluegrass, folk, blues, gospel, rhythm and blues, roots rock and southern soul. As a result of an increasingly pop-leaning mainstream, many more traditional-sounding artists such as Tyler Childers, Zach Bryan and Old Crow Medicine Show began to associate themselves more with Americana and the alternative country scene where their sound was more celebrated.

=== Africa ===
Country music has risen in popularity in a number of African countries. In a series running from 2021 on NTS Radio, researcher and broadcaster Jamal Khadar's Reimagining Country documents less well-known connections between modern country music and both African and Caribbean song writing, instruments and general influence across genres. Khadar also argues that modern country music has benefited from traditional or classical African music genres.

Specific country examples include western African, where Nigerian country music has continued to grow within the large music industry there. In eastern Africa, the roots of country can be traced back even earlier. Eswatini has a number of popular singers who blend country music with local and traditional styles of guitar, beginning in the 1970s. In the 1950s in Zambia, the opening of a number of copper mines in northern Zambia's Copperbelt region brought similar stories of industrialization and movement to the people in this area. Guitar was integrated into local music, as a result of Zambians returning from WWII and a cross-cultural interactions with international mining staff, developing a unique country folk music from the region.

=== Asia ===
In Japan, country and western music first developed a following before World War II, but many Japanese became exposed to it after the war due to the Far East Network. One of the first Japanese western acts was Biji Kuroda & The Chuck Wagon Boys, other artists include Jimmie Tokita and His Mountain Playboys, The Blue Rangers, Wagon Aces, and Tomi Fujiyama. While the majority of these musicians sung in English, a few of them sang in the Japanese language. The genre continues to have a dedicated following in Japan, thanks to Charlie Nagatani, Katsuoshi Suga, J.T. Kanehira, Dicky Kitano, and Manami Sekiya. Country and western venues in Japan include the former annual Country Gold concert, organized by Charlie Nagatani, and the modern honky tonks at Little Texas in Tokyo and Armadillo in Nagoya.

In Mongolia, there is a developing country music scene. Enkh-Erdene performed a cover of George Strait's "Amarillo by Morning" on The World's Best in 2019, he released country music album Arvan Tavnii Saran in the Mongolian language with original songs in 2023, and covered Garth Brooks' "Friends In Low Places" in 2024 on America's Got Talent: Fantasy League. The Baatar is another singer and musician of "Mongolian country" by blending country music with traditional Mongolian folk elements, including urtyn duu singing techniques and instruments like the morin khuur and tsuur, they released their first album in 2022.

In India, there is an annual concert festival called "Blazing Guitars" held in Chennai brings together Anglo-Indian musicians from all over the country (including some who have emigrated to places like Australia). The year 2003 brought home-grown Indian, Bobby Cash to the forefront of the country music culture in India when he became India's first international country music artist to chart singles in Australia.

The Philippines, a US Commonwealth from 1900 to 1946, was introduced to country music during this time. Today, in the Philippines, country music has become a part of the expression of the Cordilleran way of life. Country music from this area often compares the Igorot lifestyle to that of American cowboys.

Baguio has an FM station that caters to country music, DZWR 99.9 Country, which is part of the Catholic Media Network. Bombo Radyo Baguio has a segment on its Sunday slot for Igorot, Ilocano and country music. And as of recently, DWUB occasionally plays country music. Many country music musicians tour the Philippines. Original Pinoy Music has influences from country.

=== Australia ===
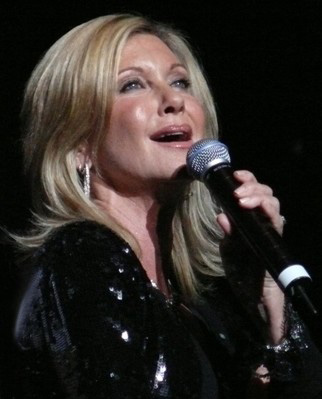
Olivia Newton-John singing in Sydney in 2008

Australian country music influenced by US country music has developed a distinct style, where guitar, banjo, fiddle and harmonica are used. Shaped by British and Irish folk ballads and Australian bush balladeers like Henry Lawson and Banjo Paterson. The aboriginal population in Australia were both artists and audience members. Auriel Andrew was the first aboriginal woman to sing country music in Australia, and was an important part of the genre's rising popularity.

Folk songs sung in Australia between the 1780s and 1920s, based around such themes as the struggle against government tyranny, or the lives of bushrangers, swagmen, drovers, stockmen and shearers, continue to influence the genre. This strain of Australian country, with lyrics focusing on Australian subjects, is generally known as "bush music" or "bush band music". "Waltzing Matilda", is often regarded as Australia's unofficial national anthem. Later themes which endure to the present include the experiences of war, of droughts and flooding rains, of Aboriginality and of the railways and trucking routes which link Australia's vast distances.

Pioneers of a more Americanised country music in Australia included Tex Morton, beginning in the 1930s. Other early stars included Buddy Williams, Shirley Thoms and Smoky Dawson. Williams was the first Australian-born to record country music in Australia in the late 1930s and began writing bush ballads, later popularized by the likes of Slim Dusty. Dusty sang Waltzing Matilda in the closing ceremony of the Sydney 2000 Olympic Games.

Reg Lindsay was one of the first Australians to perform at Nashville's Grand Ole Opry in 1974. Eric Bogle's 1972 folk lament to the Gallipoli Campaign "And the Band Played Waltzing Matilda" recalled the British and Irish origins of Australian folk-country. Singer-songwriter Paul Kelly, whose music style straddles folk, rock and country, is often described as the poet laureate of Australian music.

There have been a number of Australian country musicians who have reached global success. This includes Olivia Newton-John, Sherrié Austin and Keith Urban. Newton-John became the first (and to date only) non-US winner of the Country Music Association Award for Female Vocalist of the Year.

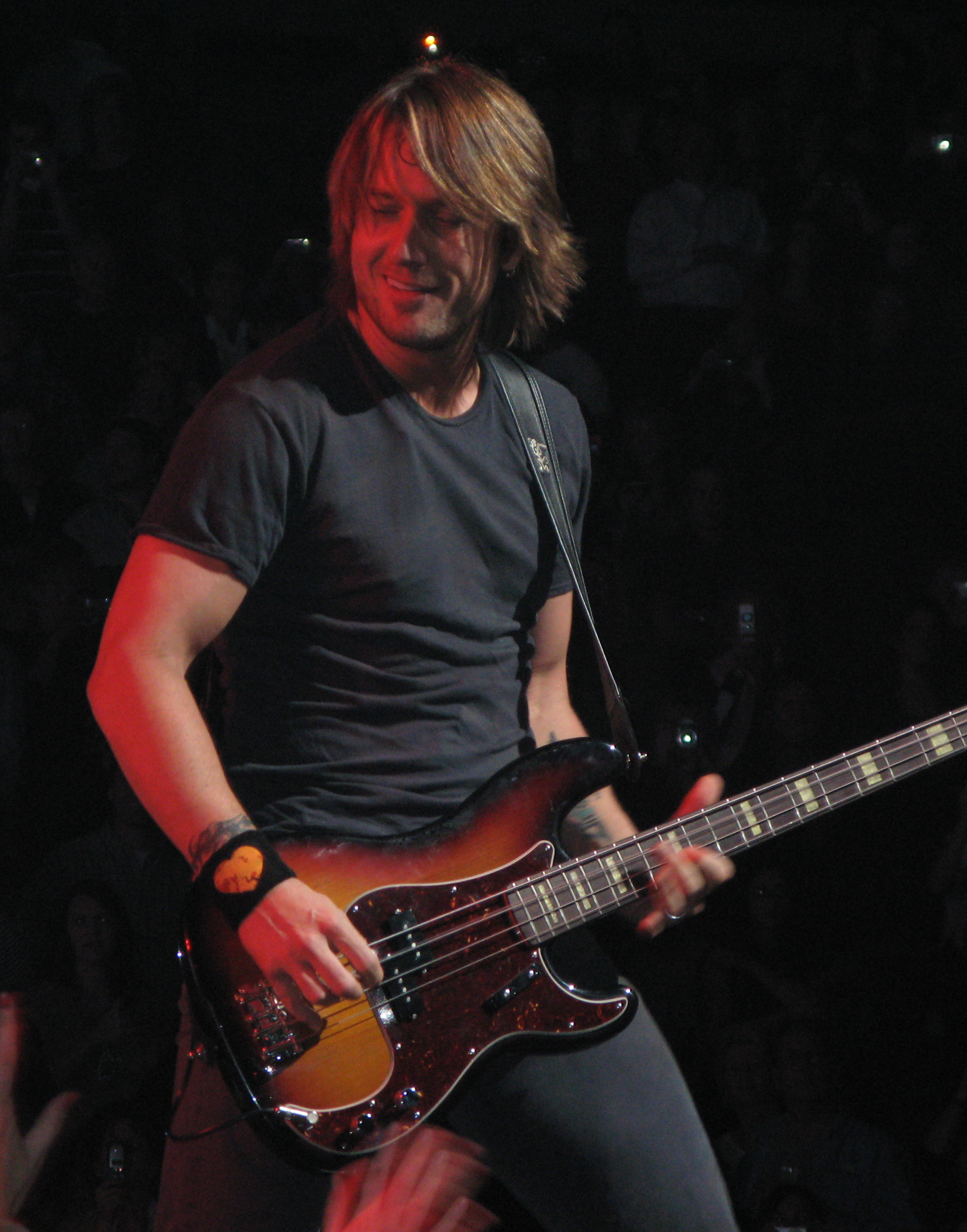
Keith Urban in 2007

By the 1990s, country music had attained crossover success in the pop charts, with artists like James Blundell and James Reyne singing Way Out West, and country star Kasey Chambers winning the ARIA Award for Best Female Artist in three years (2000, 2002 and 2004), tying with pop stars Wendy Matthews and Sia for the most wins in that category. Chambers has gone on to win nine ARIA Awards for Best Country Album and, in 2018, became the youngest artist to ever be inducted into the ARIA Hall of Fame. The crossover influence of Australian country is also evident in the music of successful contemporary bands the Waifs and the John Butler Trio. Nick Cave has been heavily influenced by the country artist Johnny Cash.

Country music has been a particularly popular form of musical expression among Indigenous Australians. Troy Cassar-Daley is among Australia's successful contemporary indigenous performers, and Kev Carmody and Archie Roach employ a combination of folk-rock and country music to sing about Aboriginal rights issues.

=== Canada ===
Mainstream country music is popular in the prairie provinces, the British Columbia Interior, Northern Ontario, and in Atlantic Canada. The origins of Canadian country music are believed to be Celtic traditional music, developed in Atlantic Canada in the form of Scottish, Acadian and Irish folk music popular among immigrants to Canada's Atlantic Provinces. This music is sometimes described as "sea shanty." While country music is popular in the Prairies, the area never developed a distinct country musical style, and instead has borrowed from US country. Given the mix of European settlers, polkas and western music were popularized.

Don Messer's Jubilee was a Halifax, Nova Scotia-based country and folk variety television show broadcast in Canada from1957 to 1969. With a guest performance slot, the show gave national exposure to numerous Canadian folk musicians, including Stompin' Tom Connors and Catherine McKinnon, as well as maritime performers Hank Snow, Wilf Carter, and Anne Murray.

Canadian country pop star Shania Twain is the best-selling female country artist of all time and one of the best-selling artists of all time in any genre. Ian & Sylvia, a country duo who produced Four Strong Winds, later received the nomination for Canada's Greatest song of all time by the Canadian Music Hall of Fame.

=== Continental Europe ===
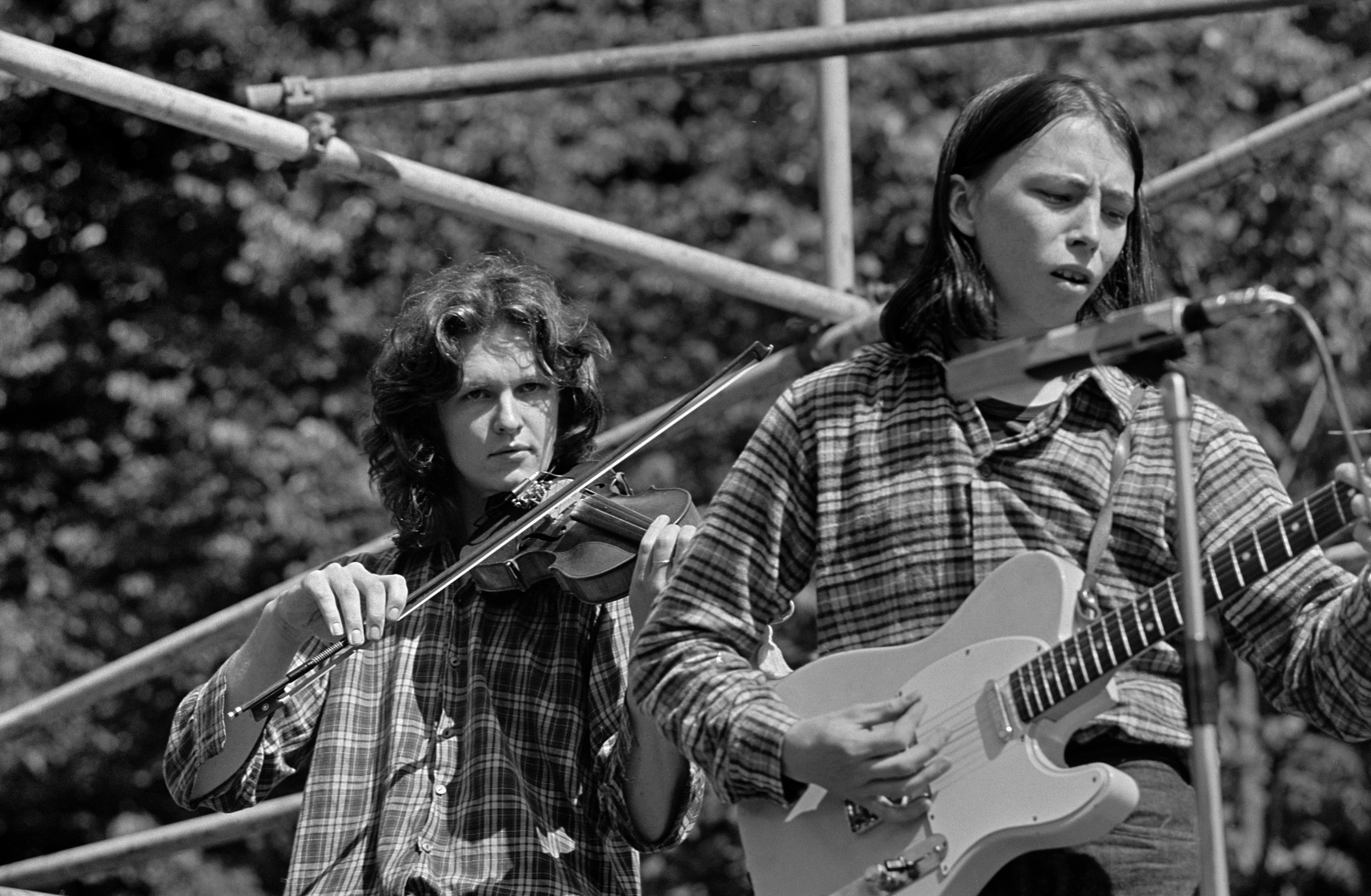
Vanha Isäntä performs at the Helsinki Festival's open-air concert in Kaivopuisto in 1974. Seppo Sillanpää (left), Olli Haavisto (right).

In Sweden, Rednex rose to stardom combining country music with electro-pop in the 1990s. In 1994, the group had a worldwide hit with their version of the traditional Southern tune "Cotton-Eyed Joe". Artists popularizing more traditional country music in Sweden have been Ann-Louise Hanson, Hasse Andersson, Kikki Danielsson, Elisabeth Andreassen and Jill Johnson.

In Poland an international country music festival, known as Piknik Country, in the city of Mrągowo has run since 1983.

In the Netherlands, there are a number of artists performing country music, mainly in English including Waylon, Pussycat (band), Ilse DeLange, Douwe Bob, Danny Vera, Jack Jersey, and Henk Wijngaard.

Norway had a significant country scene from the late 1970s to the late 2000s, although the popularity of country today is decreasing. Notable artists include Hellbillies, Bjøro Håland, Terje Tysland, Vassendgutane, and Øystein Sunde. The songs occasionally used inspirations from rock music, Norwegian folk music, and polka.

=== Ireland ===
In Ireland, Country and Irish is a music genre that combines traditional Irish folk music with US country music. Television channel TG4 began a quest for Ireland's next country star called Glór Tíre, translated as "Country Voice". James Kilbane, a country and gospel singer, has produced popular Christian and traditional country influenced albums. Other Irish singers who have produced country music include Daniel O'Donnell, Crystal Swing, and CMAT.

=== Southwest, Mexico, and Latin America ===
Country music artists from the U.S. have seen crossover with Latin American audiences, particularly in Mexico. Country music artists from throughout the U.S. have recorded renditions of Mexican folk songs, including "El Rey" which was performed on George Strait's Twang album and during Al Hurricane's tribute concert. American Latin pop crossover musicians, like Lorenzo Antonio's "Ranchera Jam" have also combined Mexican songs with country songs in a New Mexico music style.

While Tejano and New Mexico music of the Southwestern United States is typically thought of as being Spanish language, the genres have also had charting musicians focused on English language and Spanglish music. And these Southwestern styles regularly chart on the mainstream American country music charts, take for example Johnny Rodriguez, Rick Trevino, and Frank Ray. During the 1970s, singer-songwriter Freddy Fender had two #1 country music singles, that were popular throughout North America, with "Before the Next Teardrop Falls" and "Wasted Days and Wasted Nights". Notable songs which have been influenced by Hispanic and Latin culture as performed by US country music artists include Marty Robbins' "El Paso" trilogy, Willie Nelson and Merle Haggard covering the Townes Van Zandt song "Pancho and Lefty", "Toes" by Zac Brown Band, and "Sangria" by Blake Shelton.

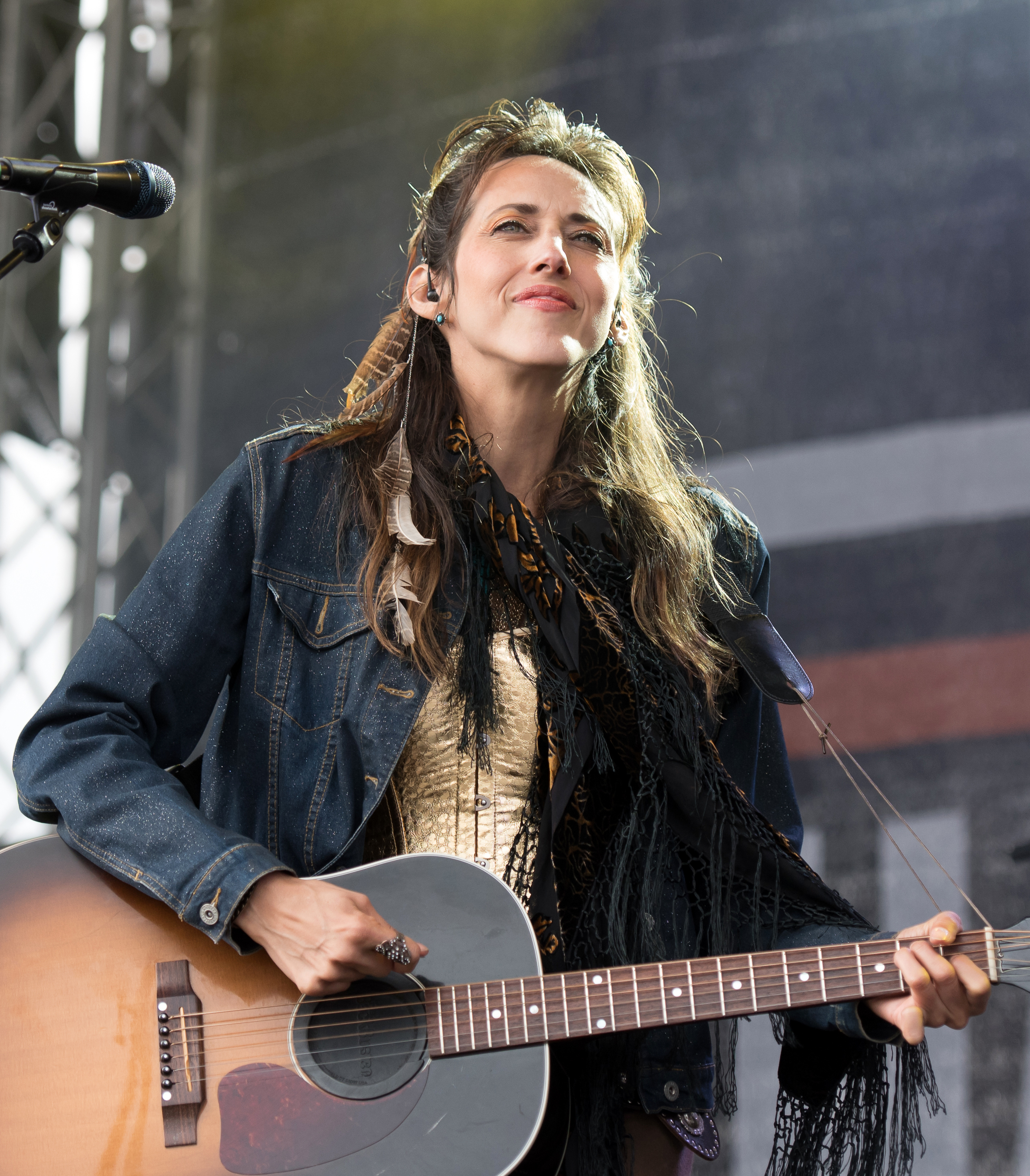
Patricia Vonne performing live

Regional Mexican is a radio format featuring many of Mexico's versions of country music. It includes a number of different styles, usually named after their region of origin. One specific song style, the Canción Ranchera, or simply Ranchera, literally meaning "ranch song", found its origins in the Mexican countryside and was first popularized with Mariachi. It has since also become popular with Grupero, Banda, Norteño, Tierra Caliente, Duranguense and other regional Mexican styles. The Corrido, a different song style with a similar history, is also performed in many other regional styles, and is most related to the western style of the United States and Canada. Other song styles performed in regional Mexican music include Ballads, Cumbias, Boleros, among others. Country en Español is also popular in Mexico. A Country en Español popularity boom also reached the central regions of Mexico during the 1990s. For most of its history, Country en Español mainly resembled Neotraditional country. However, in more modern times, some artists have incorporated influences from other subgenres.

In Argentina, on the last weekend of September, the yearly San Pedro Country Music Festival takes place in the town of San Pedro, Buenos Aires. The festival features bands from different places in Argentina, as well as international artists from Brazil, Uruguay, Chile, Peru and the U.S.

=== The Middle East ===
According to Melody Music Magazine, the pioneers of country music in Iran is the English-speaking country music band Dream Rovers, whose founder, singer and songwriter is Erfan Rezayatbakhsh (elf). The band was formed in 2007 in Tehran, and have released two studio albums. Musician Toby Keith performed alongside Saudi Arabian folk musician Rabeh Sager in 2017. This concert was similar to the performances of Jazz ambassadors that performed distinctively American style music internationally.

=== United Kingdom ===
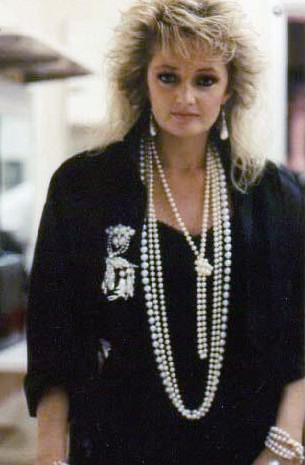
Welsh singer Bonnie Tyler had a country hit in 1978 with her song "It's a Heartache" reaching number four in the UK Singles Chart

Country music is somewhat less popular in the UK than in other English-speaking countries. Although radio stations devoted to country are among the most popular in other Anglophone nations, none of the top ten most-listened-to stations in the UK are country stations. The most successful British country music act of the 21st century are Ward Thomas and the Shires. In 2015, the Shires' album Brave, became the first UK country act ever to chart in the Top 10 of the UK Albums Chart and they became the first UK country act to receive an award from the American Country Music Association. In 2016, Ward Thomas then became the first UK country act to hit number 1 in the UK Albums Chart with their album Cartwheels.

Prior to this, country hits have been rare, with few country acts from the UK. Engelbert Humperdinck reached the U.S. country top 40 with his 1976 song, "After the Lovin'", although it failed to chart in the UK. He also achieved recognition for a number of covers of Nashville country ballads. Prior to 1980s pop stardom, Welsh singer Bonnie Tyler started her career making country records, and in 1978 her single "It's a Heartache" reached number four in the UK Singles Chart. The songwriting tandem of Roger Cook and Roger Greenaway wrote a number of country hits. Cook is the only Briton to be inducted into the Nashville Songwriters Hall of Fame.

A niche country subgenre popular in the West Country is Scrumpy and Western, which consists mostly of novelty songs and comedy music recorded in the UK. In 1975, comedian Billy Connolly topped the UK Singles Chart with "D.I.V.O.R.C.E.", a parody of the Tammy Wynette song "D-I-V-O-R-C-E" (which concurrently, and seven years after its U.S. release, became a top-20 hit in the UK at the same time as the spoof). A year later, "The Combine Harvester" became a number-one hit for Scrumpy and Western band The Wurzels; the record (already a number-one hit in Ireland for Brendan Grace) was a spoof of the Melanie pop hit "Brand New Key."

== Performances and broadcasts ==
=== Cable television broadcasts ===
A Christmas Day performance by Ana Cristina Cash at the Grand Ole Opry House, 2020

Several American television networks are at least partly devoted to the genre: Country Music Television (CMT) (the first channel devoted to country music) and CMT Music (both owned by Paramount Global), RFD-TV (owned by Rural Media Group), The Cowboy Channel (owned by Teton Ridge), Heartland (owned by Get After It Media), Circle Country (a joint venture of the Grand Ole Opry and Gray Television), The Country Network (owned by TCN Country, LLC), and Country Music Channel (the country-oriented sister channel of California Music Channel).

The Nashville Network (TNN) was launched in 1983 as a channel devoted to country music, and later added sports and outdoor lifestyle programming. It actually launched just two days after CMT. In 2000, after TNN and CMT fell under the same corporate ownership, TNN was rebranded as a non-country television channel, eventually becoming Paramount Network in 2018. TNN was later revived from 2012 to 2013 after Jim Owens Entertainment, acquired the trademark and licensed it to Luken Communications; that channel renamed itself Heartland after Luken was embroiled in an unrelated dispute that left the company bankrupt.

Great American Country (GAC) was launched in 1995, also as a country music-oriented channel that would later add lifestyle programming pertaining to the American Heartland and South. In 2021, GAC Media relaunched Great American Country as GAC Family, a family-oriented general entertainment network, while Ride TV was relaunched as GAC Living, a network devoted to programming pertaining to lifestyles of the American South. The GAC acronym which once stood for "Great American Country" now stands for "Great American Channels".

Singing shows have had a number of country music singers compete and win. American Idol launched the careers of Carrie Underwood, Kellie Pickler, Josh Gracin, Bucky Covington, Kristy Lee Cook, Danny Gokey, Lauren Alaina and Scotty McCreery. The series Nashville Star, while not nearly as successful as Idol, did manage to bring Miranda Lambert, Kacey Musgraves and Chris Young to mainstream success, also launching the careers of lower-profile musicians such as Buddy Jewell, Sean Patrick McGraw, and Canadian musician George Canyon. Can You Duet? produced the duos Steel Magnolia and Joey + Rory.

Teen sitcoms also have influenced modern country music; in 2008, actress Jennette McCurdy, best known as the sidekick Sam on the teen sitcom iCarly, released her first single and second singles, "So Close" and "Generation Love" in 2011. Another teen sitcom star, Miley Cyrus, of Disney Channel's Hannah Montana, started her career in country with the 2000s single, "The Climb." Cyrus released a duet with her father and country musician, Billy Ray Cyrus, "Ready, Set, Don't Go." Jana Kramer, an actress in the teen drama One Tree Hill, released a country album in 2012 that has produced two hit singles as of 2013. Actresses Hayden Panettiere and Connie Britton began recording country songs as part of their roles in the TV show Nashville, and Pretty Little Liars star Lucy Hale released her debut album Road Between in 2014.

In Canada, CMT broadcasts country music. In the past, the current-day Cottage Life network saw some country focus as Country Canada and later, CBC Country Canada before that network drifted into an alternate network for overflow CBC content as Bold. In earlier decades, CBC Television had country music programming including the show Don Messer's Jubilee. Gordie Tapp's Country Hoedown and its successor, The Tommy Hunter Show, ran for a combined 36 years on the CBC, from 1956 to 1992; in its last nine years on air, the U.S. cable network TNN carried Hunter's show.

In Australia, the Country Music Channel played country music, but ceased operations in June 2020 and was replaced by CMT (owned by Network 10 parent company Paramount Networks UK & Australia). Country HQ showcases new talent on the rise in the country music scene down under. Today, CMC (the Country Music Channel), a 24‑hour music channel dedicated to non-stop country music, can be viewed on pay TV and features once a year the Golden Guitar Awards, CMAs and CCMAs alongside international shows such as The Wilkinsons, The Road Hammers, and Country Music Across America.

In Britain, there is a music video channel is dedicated to country music, Music & Memories, owned by Canis Media.

=== Radio ===
In the United States, there are a significant number of local and regional radio broadcasts for country music. There are also satellite radio stations, including The Highway on Sirius XM. In Canada, Stingray Music continues maintains several country music audio-only channels. In the UK, BBC Radio does not offer a full-time country station (BBC Radio 2 Country, a "pop-up" station, operated four days each year between 2015 and 2017).

=== Music festivals ===
In the US, one of the largest country music festivals is Stagecoach, held in Palms Spring, California after the annual Coachella festival. In the United States, there are a number of regional country music festivals, some hosted by local radio stations, and others by promoters. Country music artists regularly tour throughout the United States.

Beginning in 1973, Australia hosts the Tamworth Country Music Festival attracting upwards of 100,000 visitors annually. During the festival the CMAA holds the Country Music Awards of Australia ceremony awarding the Golden Guitar trophies. Other significant country music festivals include the Whittlesea Country Music Festival near Melbourne and the Mildura Country Music Festival, hosting independent performers, and the Canberra Country Music Festival held in the national capital during November.

In the UK, There is the C2C: Country to Country festival held every year, and for many years there was a festival at Wembley Arena. Britain's largest music festival Glastonbury has featured major US country acts in recent years, such as Kenny Rogers in 2013 and Dolly Parton in 2014. The British Country Music Festival is an annual three-day festival held in Blackpool, England. It promotes artists from the UK and Ireland. Past headline artists have included Amy Wadge, Ward Thomas, Tom Odell, Nathan Carter, Lisa McHugh, Catherine McGrath, Wildwood Kin, and Henry Priestman.

== Culture ==
=== Political messaging ===
Country music, during the 1960s and 1970s, served as a foil to the counterculture folk and rock music of the time, supporting traditional and often conservative beliefs. From its inception, virtually all country music, known as hillbilly music, lacked specific political alignment, and was instead focused on everyday problems and angst of the working class. Merle Haggard's 1969 album Okie from Muskogee brought a staunchly political, conservative take on country music, which proved popular. Republican president Richard Nixon further cemented this conservative musical association during his years in office, by frequently hosting country musicians, declaring October 1970 to be country music month, and by politically pandering to audiences where country music was popular.

Thematically, modern country music has continued to promote cultural and political ideologies such as patriotism, with a focus on the military and conservative values. More recently, particularly after the September 11 attacks and the Great Recession, the ideals of nationalism and economic revitalization of the middle class were popularized in the mainstream, and subsequently in country music. Lee Greenwood's God Bless the USA was revived in popularity following the attacks of September 11, reaching the top of Billboard Hot 100. Many country artists, such as Alan Jackson with his ballad, Where Were You (When the World Stopped Turning), celebrated the military, highlighted Christian values, and emphasized nationalism in the wake of the terrorist attack. Toby Keith's Courtesy of the Red, White and Blue (The Angry American) threatened to put "a boot in" the posterior of the enemy, while Charlie Daniels's This Ain't No Rag, It's a Flag promised to "hunt" the perpetrators "down like a mad dog hound." Darryl Worley recorded Have You Forgotten, an explicitly patriotic country song in support of military intervention. During the early 2000s, country music returned to popular culture, with songs focusing on national identity and patriotism gaining support.

In contrast, after The Chicks released their third album Home, in 2003, they fell into controversy because the lead singer commented she wished she was not from the same state, Texas, as then-President George W. Bush. This comment, at the on-set of the Iraq War, was seen as contradictory to the strong patriotism demonstrated among other country artists. The comments caused a rift between the band and the country music scene. The band's fourth album, 2006's Taking the Long Way, was commercially successful among non-country audiences but largely ignored among country audiences.

With the revival of country music's popularity in the US during the 2020s, some country music has become affiliated with current conservative ideological beliefs. Notably, Jason Aldean's 2023 single "Try That in a Small Town" was released with a music video depicted images of violence in American cities, such as vandalism in urban settings and encounters between police and protestors. Aldean dismissed the claims that it had a political message, and stated the song is about the "unspoken rule...that [w]e all have each other's backs and we look out for each other." In response, Tennessee state representative Justin Jones referred to the song as a "heinous vile racist song" which attempts to normalize "racist, violence, vigilantism and white nationalism." Others also understood the lyrics to be supportive of lynchings and sundown towns. The song did receive support among prominent Republican politicians, such as Nikki Haley, after its release, and ensuing criticism.

=== Race in modern country music ===
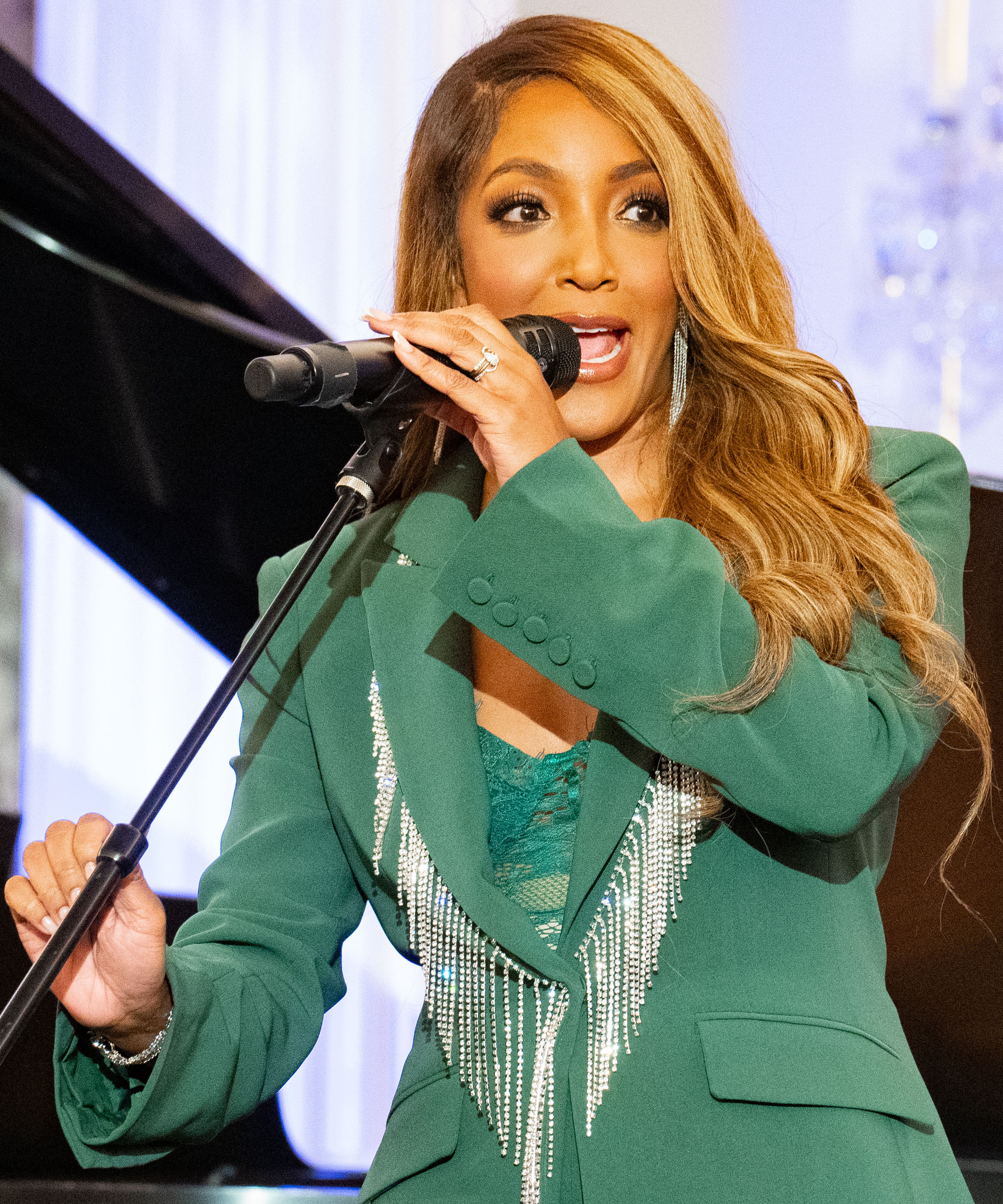
Mickey Guyton has been praised for breaking barriers as a Black woman.

The history of country music is complex, and the genre draws from influences from both African and European musical traditions. Despite this multicultural origin, country music is today largely associated with white Americans. This has been attributed to the efforts to segregate the music industry by record labels, beginning in the 1920s. However, because country music is a wide genre, sub-genres including Indian and Hispanic country, have existed since the early 1970s. Furthermore, one of the first artists to perform at the Grand Ole Opry, a famous country music show, was DeFord Bailey, who was African-American. African-American rapper Lil Nas X, whose breakout song Old Town Road, a mixture of country and rap, has achieved widespread success. His aforementioned song topped the Billboard Hot Country Songs list, before controversially being removed, sparking a debate around whether the removal was racially motivated. Billboard denied these allegations, stating that the decision was purely based on musical composition. Out of more than 2,100 country music artists and groups played on national country music radio stations from 2000 to 2020, it is reported that 3% of those artists were black, Hispanic or indigenous.

Black country-music artist Mickey Guyton had been included among the 2021 nominees for the Grammy's Best Solo Country Performance award. Guyton has expressed bewilderment that, despite substantial coverage by online platforms like Spotify and Apple Music, her music, like that of Valerie June, another black musician who embraces aspects of country in her Appalachian- and Gospel-tinged work and who has been embraced by international music audiences, is still effectively ignored by American broadcast country-music radio. Guyton's 2021 album Remember Her Name in part references the case of black health-care professional Breonna Taylor, who was killed in her home by police.

In 2024, Beyoncé published her country music-inspired eighth studio album Cowboy Carter, a project conceptualized as a journey through a reinvention of Americana, spotlighting the overlooked contributions of Black pioneers to American musical and cultural history. The album had a cultural and commercial impact on black country artists, being praised by critics and artists belonging to the music genre.

== See also ==
- American Country Countdown Awards
- CMT Music Awards – Fan-voted awards show for country music videos
- Country (identity) – Concept of country as part of one's identity
- Country Music Hall of Fame and Museum
- Culture of the Southern United States
- List of country music performers
- List of RPM number-one country singles
- Music genre – Classification of music by tradition or style
- Music of the United States
- Western Music Association
