= Rabeh Saqer =

Rabeh Saqer رابح صقر
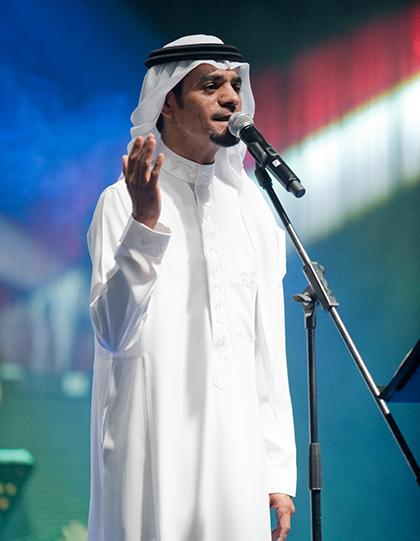
- Saqer in 2009

Background information
- Born: Issa Saleh Issa Al Saqer عيسى صالح عيسى الصقر
- Origin: Saudi Arabia
- Genres: Arabic music
- Years active: 1983–present
- Labels: Donfon (1983–85); Fonoon AlJazeera (1985–96); Rotana Group (1996–present)
- Website: http://www.rabe7.com/

Rabeh Saqer (Arabic: رابح صقر) is a Saudi Arabian singer.
