= Charlie Nagatani =

Japanese country music singer-songwriter

- Born: Masateru Nagatani
- Origin: Kumamoto, Kyushu, Japan
- Genre: Country
- Occupations: Singer; songwriter
- Instruments: Vocals; guitar
- Years active: 1961–present

Masateru Nagatani, known professionally as Charlie Nagatani, is a Japanese country music singer-songwriter. He started performing music with his band Charlie and the Cannonballs in 1961, which is one of the longest-running music groups in Japanese history.

He opened a honky tonk in his hometown of Kumamoto called Good Time Charlie, and started the Country Gold music festival at Mount Aso in 1989. His first studio album in 1992 Charlie Nagatani Sings Country Gold featured Emmylou Harris, Bill Monroe, the Osborne Brothers, and Porter Wagoner.

== Career ==
Nagatani heard his first country music concert by Hillbilly Jamboree in 1956.

He has honorary citizenship in 33 U.S. states and he is a Kentucky Colonel. He and his wife Toshiko have had dinner with the President of the United States multiple times.

He was featured in the 2019 documentary Far Western.

=== Country Gold Festival ===
Country music performers from around the world performed at the Country Gold Festival, which ran from 1989 to 2019. Including Brad Paisley and Rick Trevino.

== Discography ==
=== Charlie Nagatani Sings Country Gold ===
No.	Title	Length
1.	"Wild Side of Life" (feat. Emmylou Harris)
2.	"Walkin' The Floor Over You"
3.	"Freulein"
4.	"Crazy"
5.	"Rocky Top" (feat. the Osborne Brothers)
6.	"My Woman, My Woman, My Wife"
7.	"My Name Is Goodtime Charlie" (Michael Woody / Charlie Nagatani)
8.	"Truck Drivin' Man" (feat. Porter Wagoner)
9.	"Rose of San Antone"
10.	"Bouquet of Roses"
11.	"Tennessee Waltz / Kentucky Waltz Medley" (feat. Bill Monroe)
