= Tomi Fujiyama =

Tomi Fujiyama トミ藤山
- Born: January 10, 1941 (age 85)
- Origin: Nagoya, Aichi, Japan
- Genre: Country
- Occupations: Singer; songwriter
- Instruments: Vocals; guitar
- Years active: 1951–present
- Website: tomifujiyama.jp

Tomi Fujiyama (トミ藤山; January 10, 1941) is a Japanese country music singer-songwriter.

In 1952, at the age of twelve, she began singing country western despite not speaking English. She performed at U.S. military bases, eventually being signed with Columbia Records. By 1964 she had recorded five albums and twenty-one singles for the company. That year she was booked to play regularly at The Mint Las Vegas, and also performed for the first time at the Grand Ole Opry, receiving a standing ovation. In 1965, her song "Lonely Together" was the first song by a Japanese singer to reach the American country music charts. Shortly after, she returned to Japan, where she has continued to perform.

Fujiyama was the subject of the 2015 documentary film Made In Japan.

== Bibliography ==
- Tomi Fujiyama (2004). ころび 転ぶよ 音楽人生 (in Japanese). Tōkyō: Bungeisha. ISBN 4-8355-6955-5. OCLC 169693021.
