= Quebec fiddle =

Music genre

Quebec fiddle is a part of the Old time fiddle canon and is influential in New England and Northwest fiddle styles.

== History and development ==
According to Reiner and Anick, the affinity between Anglo-Celtic and French fiddle music dates to the 17th century. Solo style predominated in the rugged frontier land where a small fiddle could be easily managed. Thus, cross tunings, drone notes and complex rhythms evolved to fill the gaps left in unaccompanied playing and this resulted in a highly developed style. Clogging was often the only available accompaniment, and, much like the Indigenous Metis fiddle style, percussive and rhythmic playing is notably developed in this style. As with the French-speaking Cajun fiddle style, German button accordion created a fad which temporarily influenced the form, as did the eventual introduction of piano in the urban center Montreal.

== Repertoire and style ==
The repertoire is, in some respects, generally the same as that of American, Canadian and Oldtime fiddle, but with the addition of French-derived chanson. However, the interpretation is quite different. For example, Lisa Ornstein's treatment of The Devil's Dream (Reel du Diable) emphasized double stop and rhythmic ornament seldom found in US interpretations.

This style is also demonstrated in a rare 2011 performance by Kevin Burke in which he plays three reels from Quebec (Reel de Napoleon, Reel en Sol (Reel in G), and Guy Thomas).

He also recorded this set with Celtic Fiddle Festival on their 2008 CD Equinox. The percussive use of footwork, however, is not limited to the First Nations musicians. Fiddle music, in general, lends itself well to group playing and percussive use of feet and hands, as in the performance of La Turlette at Kyneton, central Victoria, where the Celtic Southern Cross Summer School produced this ethnomusicologically notable clip.

== Notable musicians ==
=== Joseph Allard ===
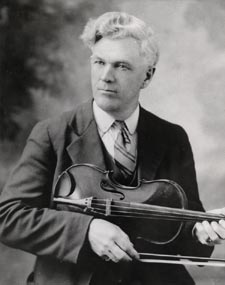
Joseph Allard in 1927

Joseph Allard (February 1, 1873 – November 14, 1947) was a Quebec fiddler who made many popular recordings earning him the title The Prince of Fiddlers. His family lived in Quebec when he was quite young. Allard's father was a violoneux, and, when Allard reached the age of nine, he began formal fiddle instruction. Allard remained in Quebec until the age of sixteen at which time he moved back to the United States. He entered fiddling competitions throughout New England, winning in Massachusetts, New Hampshire, Rhode Island and Connecticut. Scottish and Irish musicians he met through his travels taught him a number of Reels and Gigues.

He continued to travel and play in the United States until 1917 when he returned to Canada and settled near Montreal. Allard was one of five fiddlers to represent Quebec at a worldwide competition held in Lewiston, Maine in 1926 alongside Johnny Boivin, A. S. Lavallée, Médard Bourgie and Ferdinand Boivin. In 1928, Victor's Bluebird label contracted him to make recordings for them. He went on to produce seventy-five 78-rpm records in his career and would record six more under the pseudonym Maxime Toupin. Allard was one of the first French Canadians fiddlers to record commercially. Apart from traditional songs, Allard also wrote around sixty songs of his own.

=== Jean “Ti-Jean” Carignan ===
Jean “Ti-Jean” Carignan (December 7, 1916, Lévis - February 16, 1988, Montreal) is perhaps the most famous Québécois fiddler since Allard. He started to play violin at the age of four, and, at age seven, his family moved to Montreal. Joseph Allard eventually became his role model after he heard one of Allard's recordings which whom Carignan began studying in 1926. He also learned the repertories from the Irish fiddler Michael Coleman, from whom he received most of his stylistic influence, and from Scotch fiddle player James Scott Skinner. Carignan's other major influences included Louis Boudreault, Yehudi Menuhin and Henryk Szeryng.

In 1976, Carignan released Jean Carignan rend hommage à Joseph Allard, a tribute album to Allard.

== See also ==
- Louis Beaulieu
