= List of people from Albuquerque, New Mexico =

This is a list of notable people who were either born in, lived for a significant period of time in, or are otherwise closely associated with Albuquerque, New Mexico.

== Academia and science ==
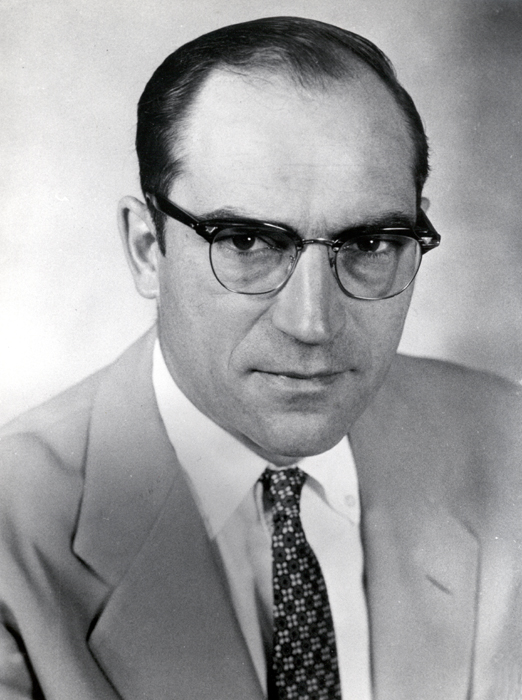
Luna Leopold, geologist

Person	Lifespan	Notability	Connection	Ref.
Nina Leopold Bradley	1917–2011	Conservationist	Born	
Bainbridge Bunting	1913–1981	Architectural historian	Resident	
Alfred A. Cave	1935–2019	Historian	Born	
Juan Cole	1952–	Historian	Born	
Brian Conrey	1955–	Mathematician	Raised	
Marie Cowan	1938–2008	Nurse and academic	Born	
David Eagleman	1971–	Neuroscientist and science communicator	Born and raised	
Patrick D. Gallagher	1963–	Physicist, University of Pittsburgh chancellor, and NIST director	Born and raised	
Laura E. Gómez	1964–	Law professor	Raised; resident	
Frank C. Hibben	1910–2002	Archeologist, anthropologist, and zoologist	Resident	
Helen S. Lang	1947–2016	Philosophy professor	Raised	
Floy Agnes Lee	1922–2018	Hematology technician and biologist	Born and raised	
A. Carl Leopold	1919–2009	Plant physiologist	Born	
Luna Leopold	1915–2006	Geomorphologist and hydrologist	Born	
William Randolph Lovelace II	1907–1965	Physician and aerospace medicine researcher	Resident	
William Nordhaus	1941–2026	Economist	Born and raised	
Raymond Rogers	1927–2005	Chemist	Born	
Clayton Sam White	1912–2004	Physician and biomedical researcher	Resident	

== Acting and filmmaking ==
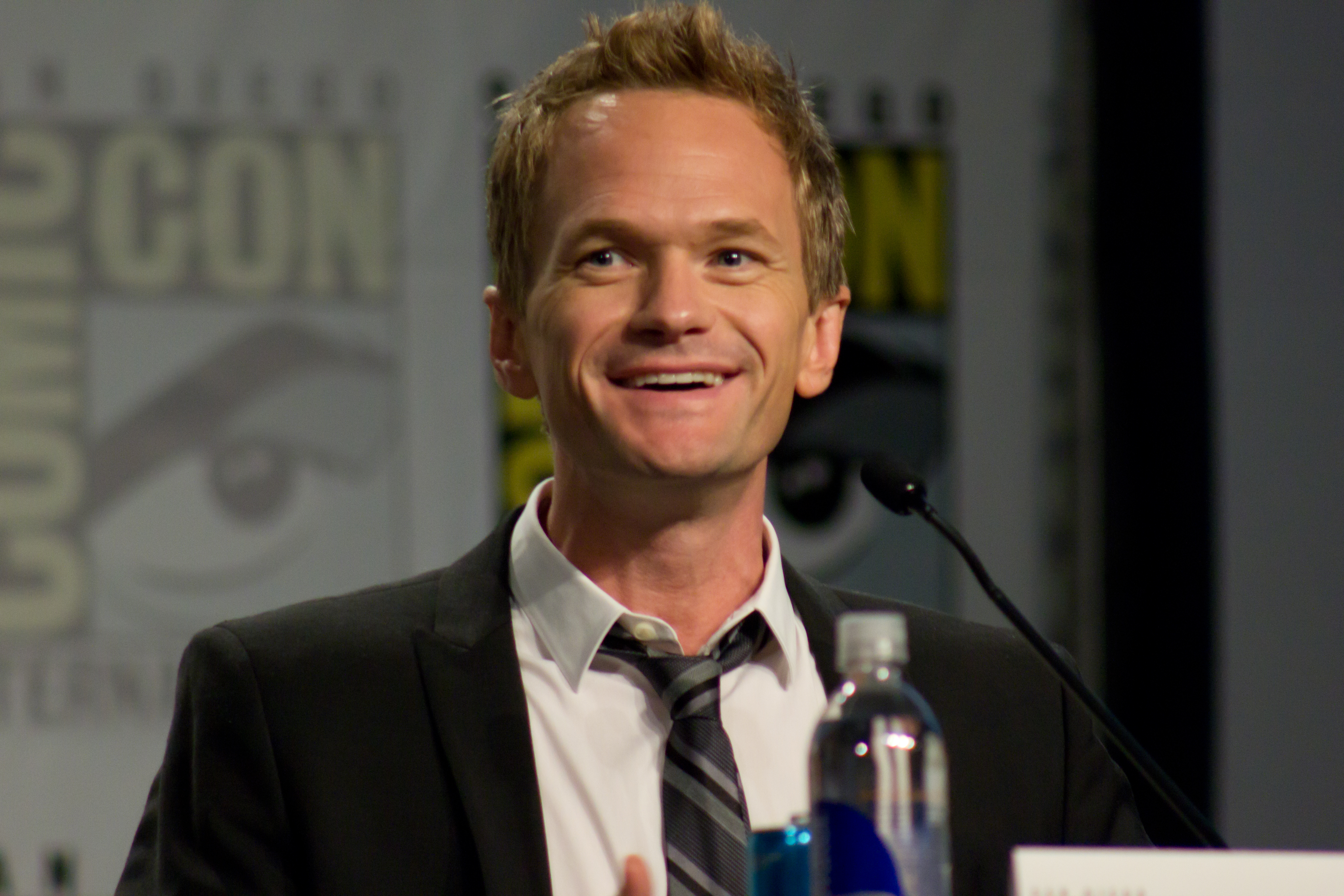
Neil Patrick Harris, actor

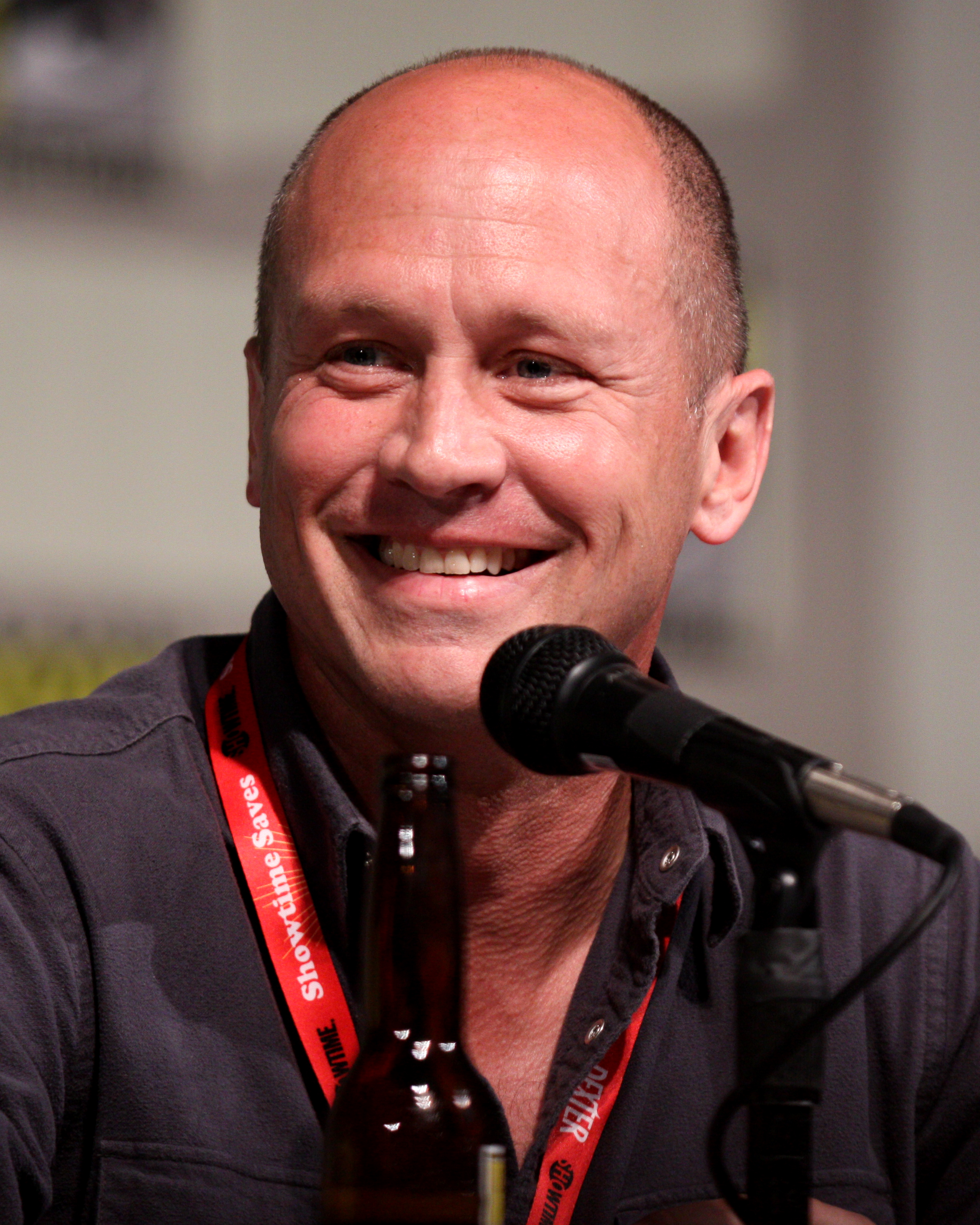
Mike Judge, writer and director

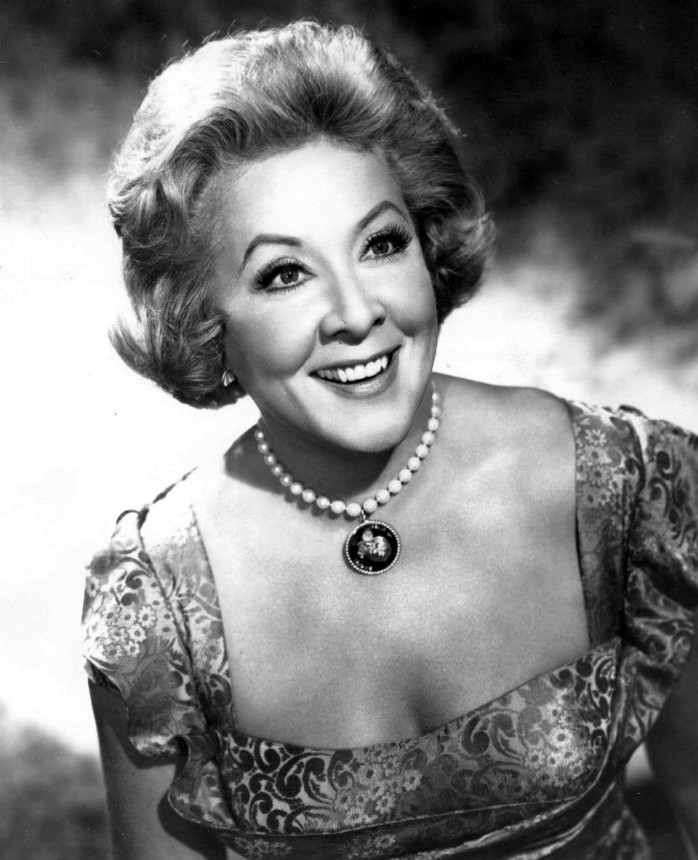
Vivian Vance, actor

Person	Lifespan	Notability	Connection	Ref.
Seth Adkins	1989–	Actor	Born and raised	
Don Alvarado	1904–1967	Actor	Born and raised	
Ari Aster	1986–	Director, filmmaker	Raised	
Leah Clark	1979–	Voice actor for Funimation	Born	
Edmund Cobb	1892–1974	Actor	Born and raised	
Bill Daily	1927–2018	Actor, comedian	Resident	
Shari Eubank	1947–	Actor	Born	
Jesse Tyler Ferguson	1975–	Actor	Raised	
Annabeth Gish	1971–	Actor	Born	
Forrest Goodluck	1998–	Actor	Born	
Neil Patrick Harris	1973–	Actor	Born	
Freddie Prinze Jr.	1976–	Actor	Raised	
Mike Judge	1962–	Animator, actor, writer, creator of Beavis and Butthead and King of the Hill	Raised	
Isaac Kappy	1977–2019	Actor	Born	
Minka Kelly	1980–	Actor	Raised	
Benito Martinez	1971–	Actor	Born and raised	
Patrice Martinez	1963–2018	Actor	Born and raised	
Carroll McComas	1886–1962	Actor	Born	
Steven Michael Quezada	1963–	Actor	Born and raised; resident	
Tracy Reiner	1964–	Actor	Born	
Jay Roach	1957–	Director, producer	Born and raised	
Bernardo Saracino		Actor	Born and raised	
Willow Shields	2000–	Actor	Born and raised	
Madolyn Smith	1957–	Actor	Born	
French Stewart	1964–	Actor	Born and raised	
Slim Summerville	1892–1946	Actor	Born	
Lisandra Tena	1987–	Actor	Born and raised	
Vivian Vance	1909–1979	Actor, singer	Resident	
Tony Vincent	1973–	Actor, singer	Born and raised	

== Art and architecture ==
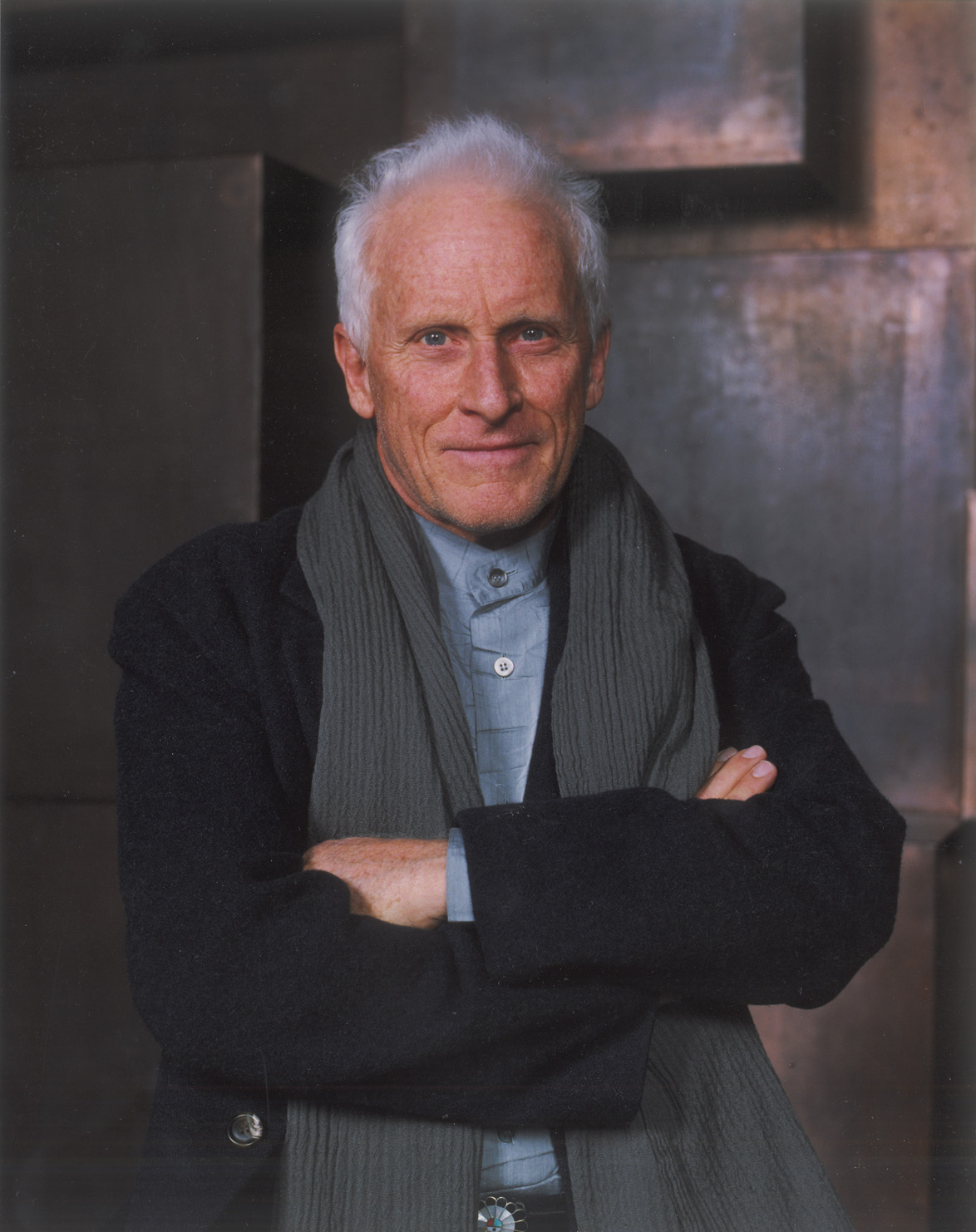
Antoine Predock, architect

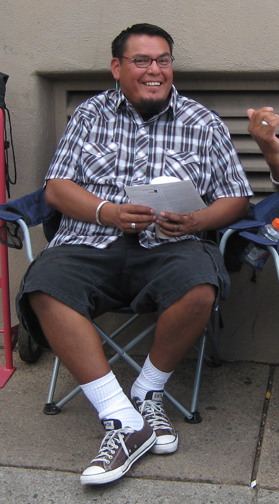
Ryan Singer, painter

Person	Lifespan	Notability	Connection	Ref.
Miles Brittelle	1894–1970	Architect	Resident	
Oskar D'Amico	1923–2003	Painter	Resident	
Elisheva Biernoff	1980–	Visual artist	Born	
Tony Feher	1956–2016	Sculptor	Born	
Max Flatow	1915–2003	Architect	Resident	
T. Charles Gaastra	1879–1947	Architect	Resident	
Alice Garver	1924–1966	Painter and printmaker	Resident	
Douglas Kent Hall	1938–2008	Photographer and writer	Resident	
Frederick Hammersley	1919–2009	Painter	Resident	
Daniel Kaven	1977–	Architect and artist	Born and raised	
Nancy Kozikowski	1943–	Weaver and artist	Born; resident	
Jessamyn Lovell	1977–	Photographer	Resident	
Malaquías Montoya	1938–	Visual artist	Born	
Brian O'Connor	1958–	Visual artist	Resident	
Hal Olsen	c. 1920–	Nose art painter	Resident	
Emi Ozawa	1962–	Sculptor	Resident	
Antoine Predock	1936–2024	Architect	Resident	
Bart Prince	c. 1947–	Architect	Born and raised; resident	
Connie Samaras		Photographer	Born	
Ryan Singer	1973–	Painter	Resident	
Eloy Torrez	1954–	Painter	Born	
Mary Tsiongas	1959–	Contemporary artist, academic	Resident	
Robert Williams	1943–	Artist	Born and raised	
Joel-Peter Witkin	1939–	Photographer	Resident	

== Aviation and spaceflight ==
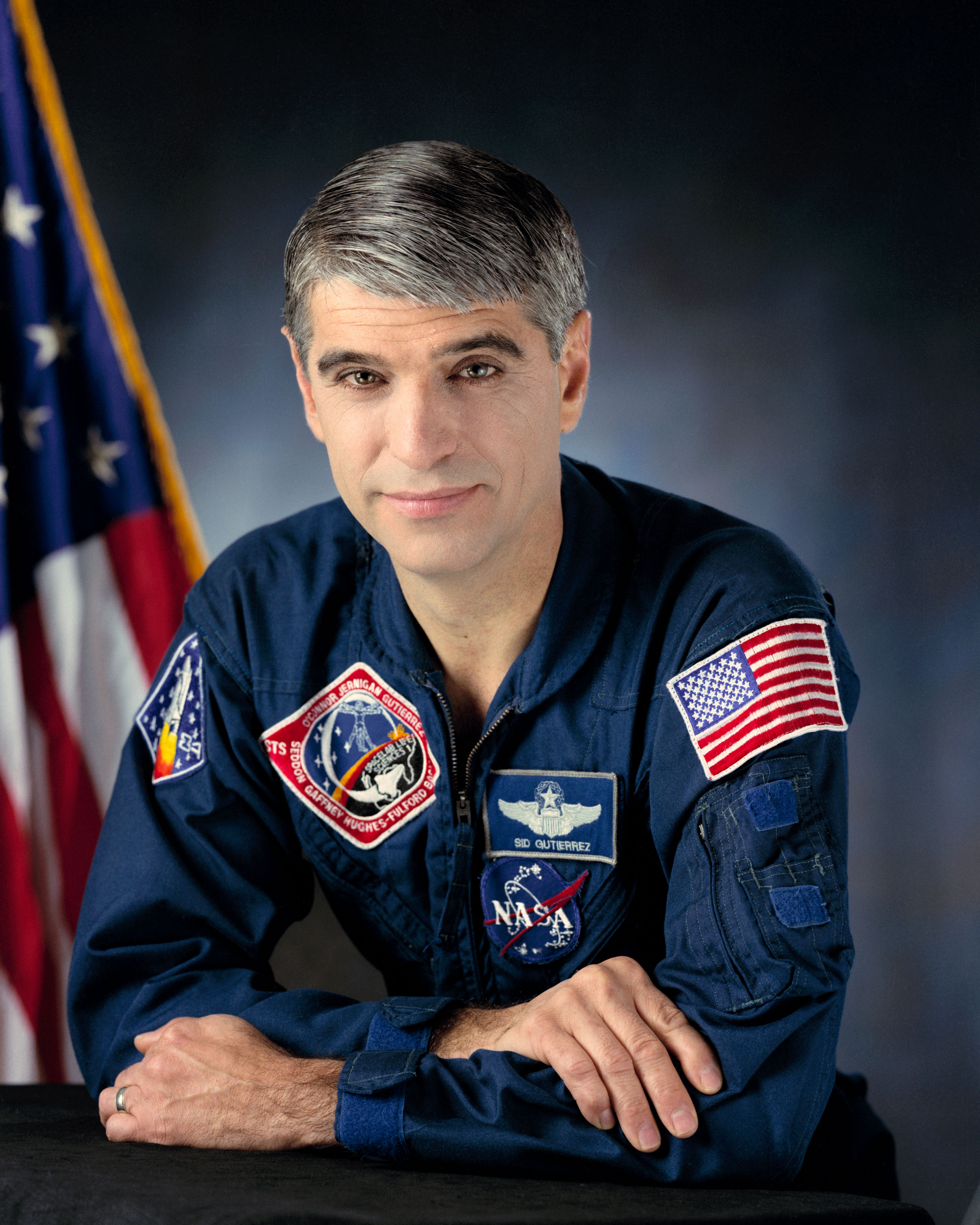
Sidney Gutierrez, astronaut

Person	Lifespan	Notability	Connection	Ref.
Ben Abruzzo	1930–1985	Balloonist	Resident	
Richard Abruzzo	1963–2010	Balloonist		
Maxie Anderson	1934–1983	Balloonist	Resident	
Sidney Gutierrez	1951–	Astronaut	Born and raised	
Mike Mullane	1945–	Astronaut	Raised	

== Business ==
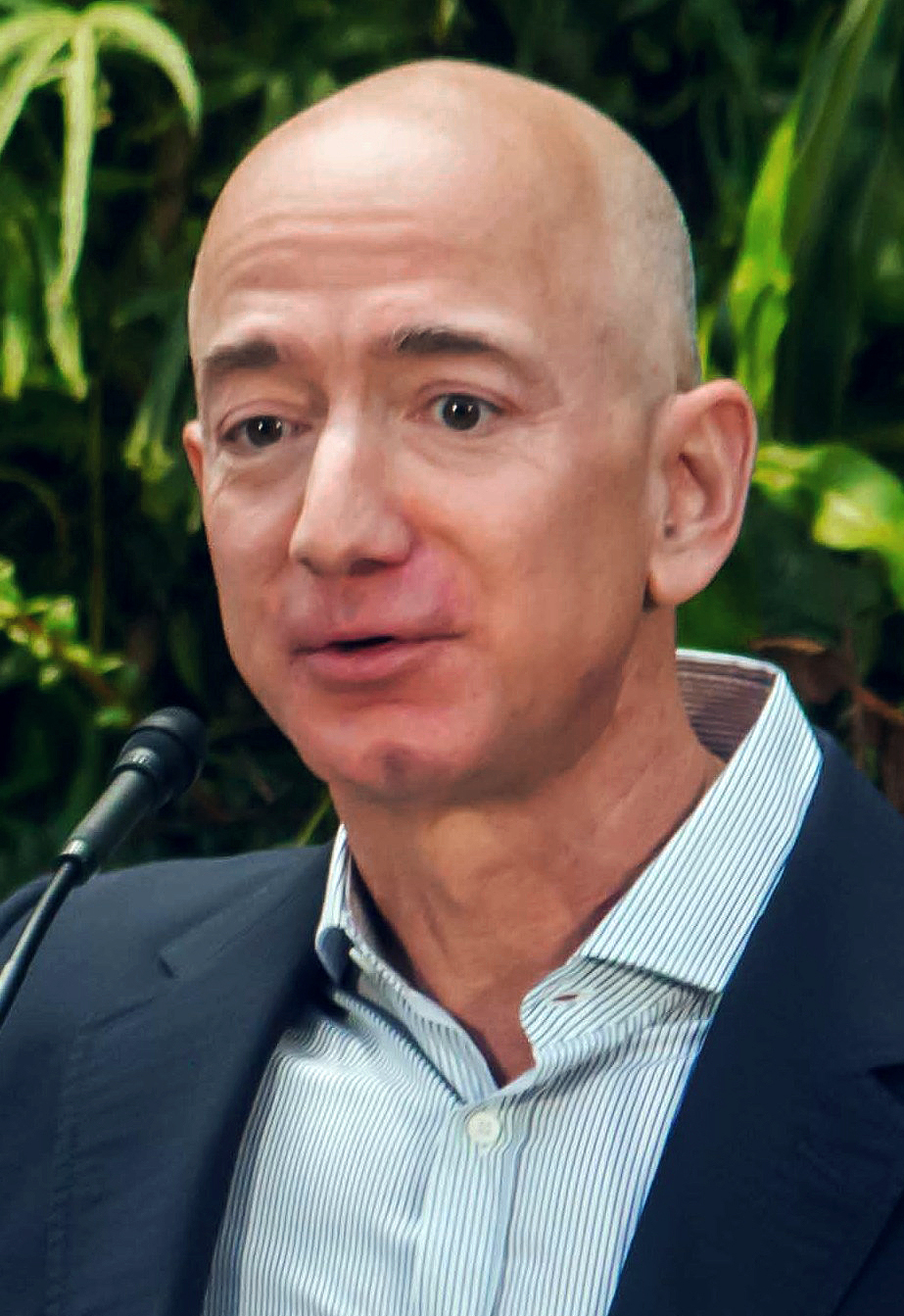
Jeff Bezos, Amazon founder and CEO

Person	Lifespan	Notability	Connection	Ref.
Jeff Bezos	1964–	Founder and CEO of Amazon.com	Born	
Alissa Chavez	c. 1996–	Inventor and entrepreneur	Born and raised	
Franz Huning	1827–1905	Businessman and pioneer	Resident	
Adrienne Maloof	1961–	Businesswoman and TV personality	Born and raised	
George J. Maloof Sr.	1923–1980	Businessman, Houston Rockets owner	Resident	
George J. Maloof Jr.	1964–	Businessman, former Sacramento Kings owner	Born and raised	
Fannie S. Spitz	1873–1943	Inventor	Resident	
Joel Spolsky	1965–	Software engineer and executive	Born and raised	

== Government, politics, and law ==
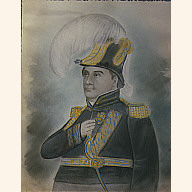
Manuel Armijo, Mexican governor of New Mexico

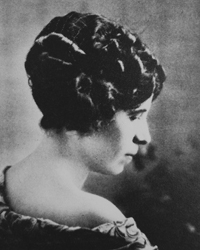
Soledad C. Chacón, New Mexico secretary of state

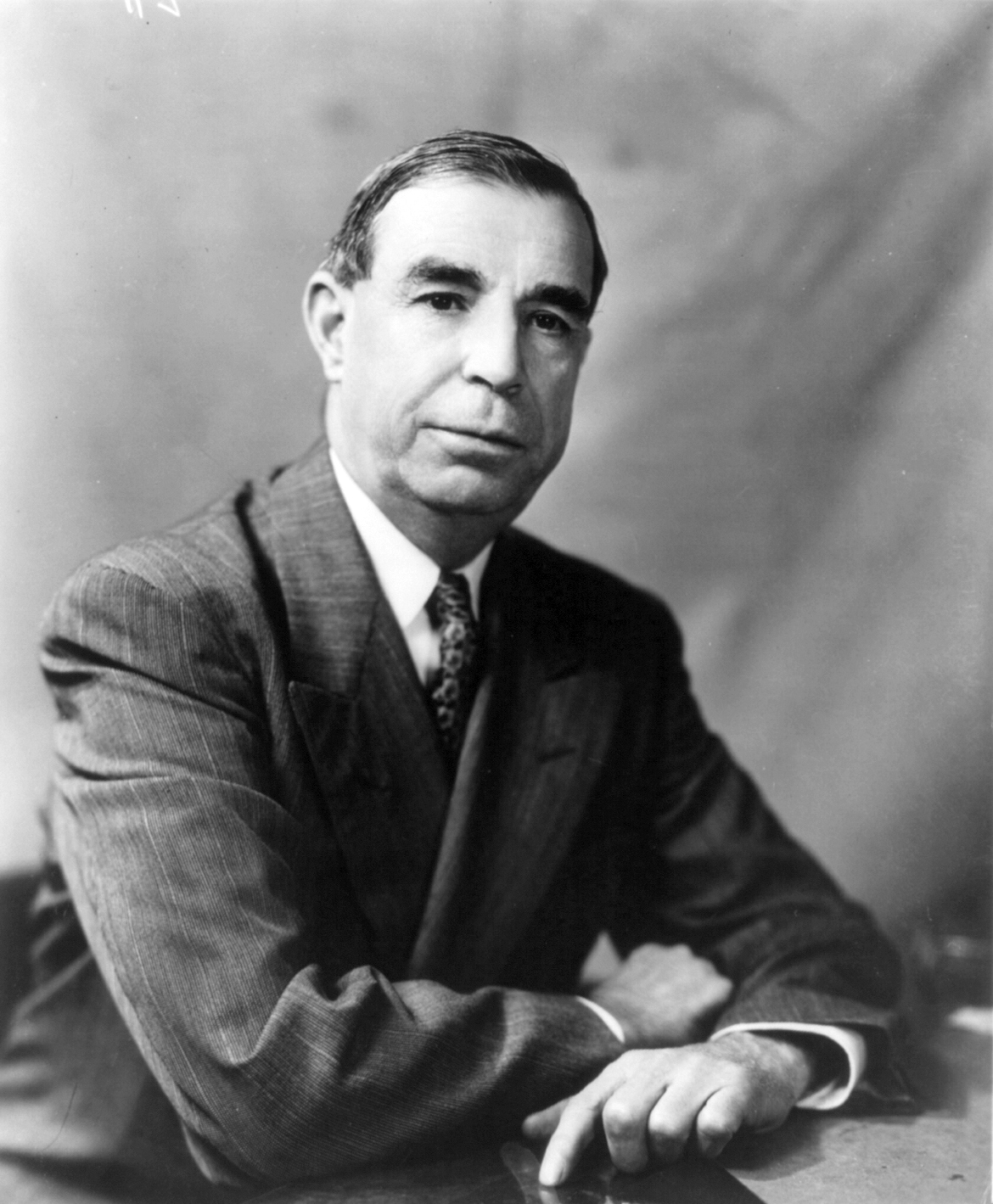
Dennis Chávez, U.S. senator

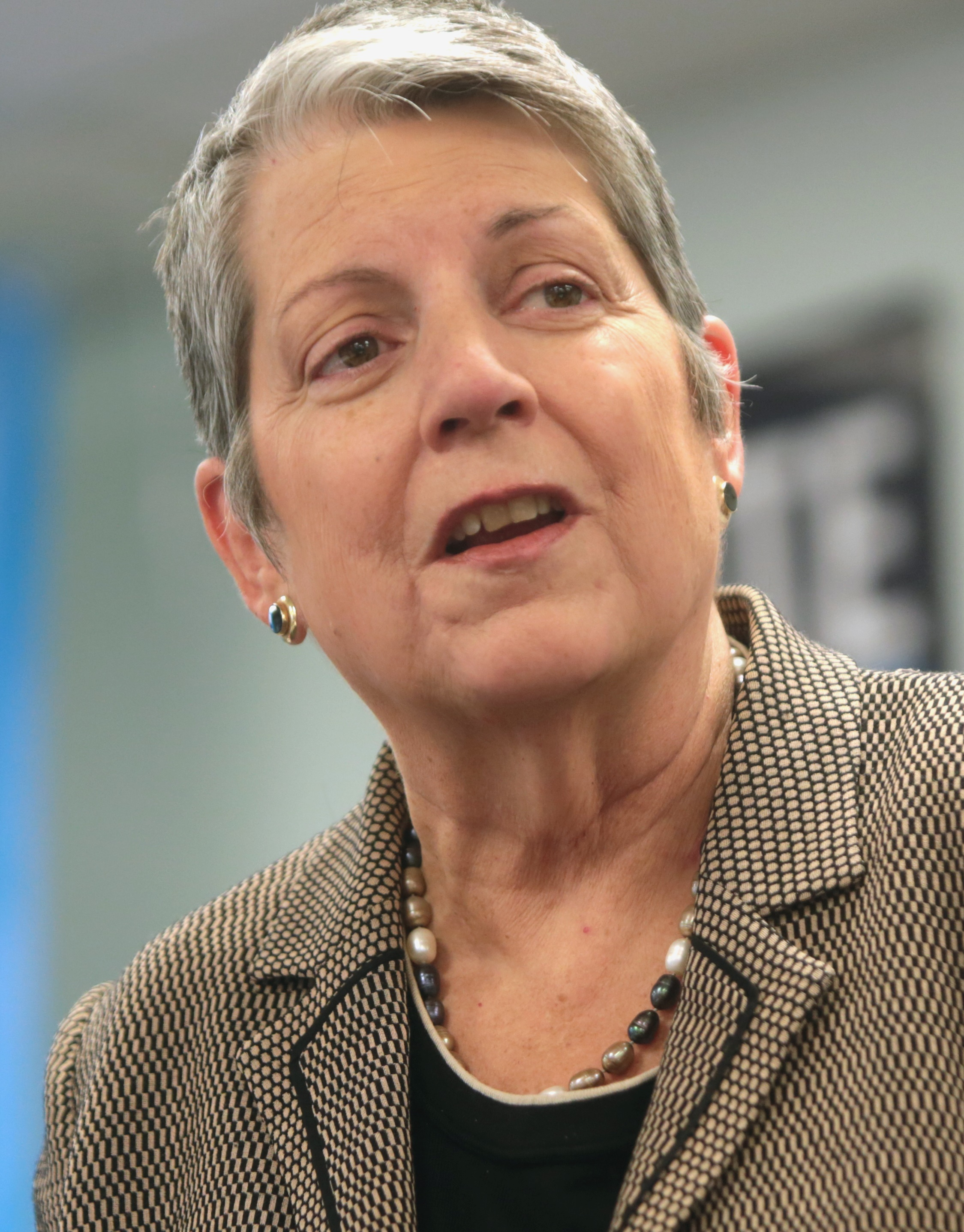
Janet Napolitano, governor of Arizona

Person	Lifespan	Notability	Connection	Ref.
Clinton Anderson	1895–1975	U.S. senator from New Mexico	Resident	
Thomas Anderson	1933–2024	New Mexico state representative	Resident	
Deanna Archuleta	1964–	U.S. Department of the Interior official	Resident	
Manuel Armijo	c. 1793–1853	Mexican governor of New Mexico	Resident	
Janice Arnold-Jones	1952–	New Mexico state representative	Resident	
Norman Bay	1960–	U.S. attorney and FERC chairman	Resident	
David Bowdich	1969–	FBI deputy director	Born and raised	
George D. Buffett	1928–2012	New Mexico state representative	Resident	
Jacob Candelaria	c. 1986–	New Mexico state senator	Born and raised; resident	
David Cargo	1929–2013	Governor of New Mexico	Resident	
Soledad C. Chacón	1890–1936	New Mexico secretary of state and state representative	Born and raised; resident	
Dennis Chávez	1888–1962	U.S. senator from New Mexico	Raised; resident	
Levi Chavez		Police officer acquitted of murder	Police officer	
Pete Domenici	1932–2017	U.S. senator from New Mexico	Born and raised; resident	
Harvey Butler Fergusson	1848–1915	U.S. representative from New Mexico	Resident	
Kate Gallego	1981–	Mayor of Phoenix	Born and raised	
Martin Heinrich	1971–	U.S. senator from New Mexico	Resident	
Thomas E. Horn	1946–	Attorney, trustee of San Francisco War Memorial and Performing Arts Center	Born and raised	
Tim Keller	1977–	Mayor of Albuquerque, state senator, and state auditor	Born and raised; resident	
Petra Jimenez Maes	1947–	New Mexico Supreme Court Chief Justice	Born and raised	
Lenton Malry	1931–	Member of the New Mexico House of Representatives (1969–1979)	Resident	
Néstor Montoya	1862–1923	U.S. representative from New Mexico	Born and raised	
Janet Napolitano	1957–	U.S. secretary of Homeland Security and governor of Arizona	Raised	
Rory Ogle	1954–2013	New Mexico state representative	Resident	
Francisco Perea	1830–1913	Congressional delegate from New Mexico Territory	Born; resident	
Jane Powdrell-Culbert	1949–	New Mexico state representative	Born and raised	
Bernard Shandon Rodey	1856–1927	Congressional delegate from New Mexico Territory	Resident	
Edmund G. Ross	1826–1907	U.S. senator from Kansas and governor of New Mexico Territory	Resident	
Debra M. Sariñana		New Mexico state representative	Born; resident	
Steven Schiff	1947–1998	U.S. representative from New Mexico	Resident	
Oliver Seth	1915–1996	United States circuit judge	Born	
Albert G. Simms	1882–1964	U.S. representative from New Mexico	Resident	
Brandt Smith	1959–	Arkansas state representative	Born	
Tina Smith	1958–	U.S. senator from Minnesota	Born	
Melanie Stansbury	1979–	U.S. representative from New Mexico and former New Mexico state representative	Raised	
Sheryl Williams Stapleton	1957–	New Mexico state representative and House majority leader	Resident	
Elias S. Stover	1836–1927	Politician, businessman, and first president of the University of New Mexico	Resident	
Harry Stowers	1926–2015	New Mexico Supreme Court chief justice	Resident	
Clyde Tingley	1882–1960	Governor of New Mexico	Resident	
E. S. Johnny Walker	1911–2000	U.S. representative from New Mexico	Resident	
Vicente T. Ximenes	1919–2014	Civil servant and activist	Resident	

== Journalism and broadcasting ==
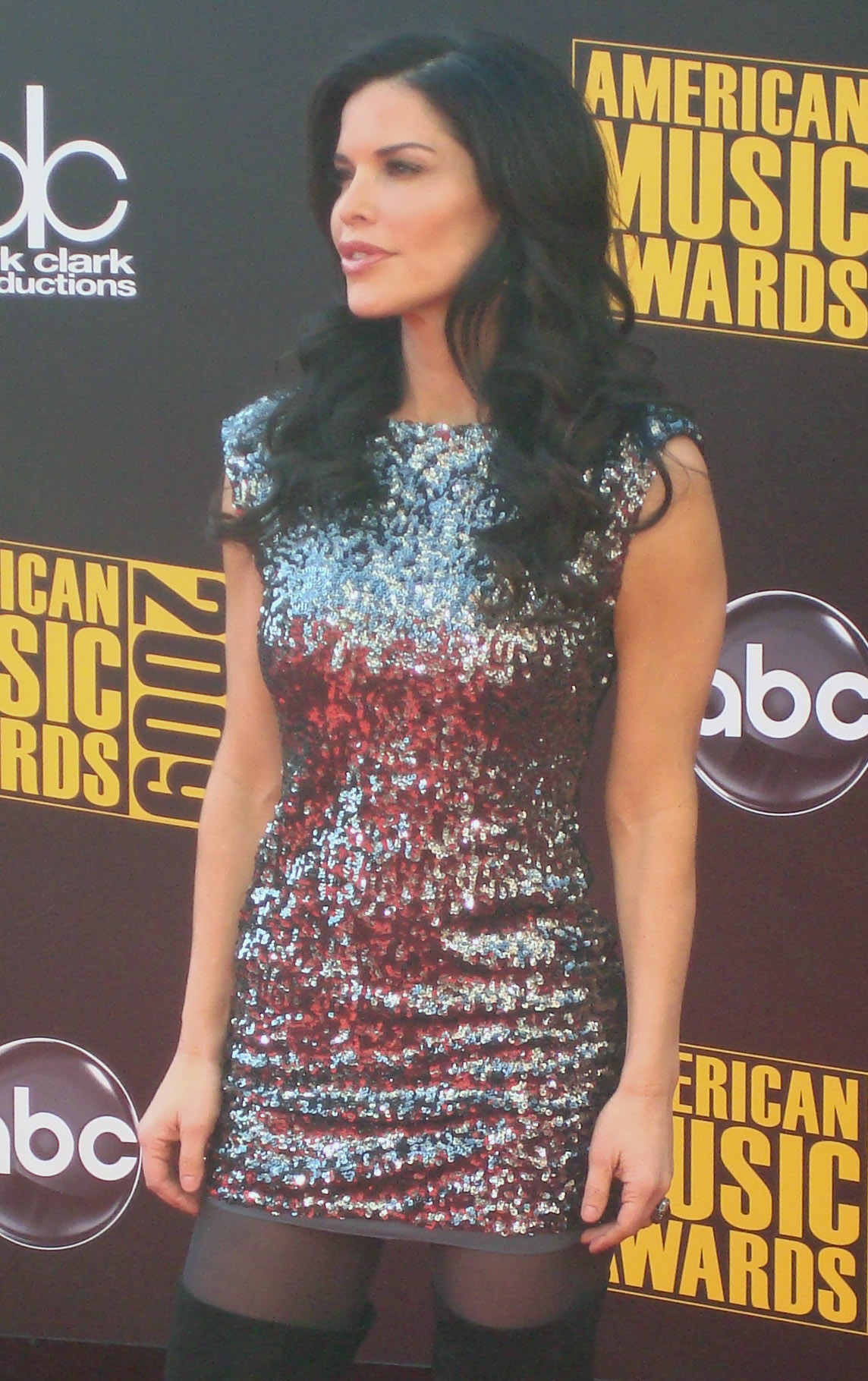
Lauren Sánchez, news anchor and TV personality

Person	Lifespan	Notability	Connection	Ref.
Linda Chavez	1947–	Political commentator	Born	
Val De La O	1936–	TV personality/host of the Val De La O Show	Resident	
Diane Dimond	1952–	News anchor and reporter	Raised	
George Fischbeck	1922–2015	Weather reporter and TV personality	Resident	
Thomas E. Horn	1946–	Publisher of Bay Area Reporter	Born and raised	
Howard Morgan	1930–2021	Weather reporter	Resident	
Ernie Pyle	1900–1945	War correspondent	Resident	
Joshua Cooper Ramo	1968–	Journalist and consultant	Raised	
Mike Roberts	1933–2016	Sportscaster	Resident	
Lauren Sánchez	1969–	News anchor and TV personality	Born and raised	
Eddy Aragon		Talk radio personality and former mayoral candidate	Resident	

== Military ==
Person	Lifespan	Notability	Connection	Ref.
Manuel Antonio Chaves	1818–1889	Soldier	Born	
Neil McCasland	1957–	U.S. Air Force major general and former commander of the Air Force Research Laboratory	Born	
Harold H. Moon Jr.	1921–1944	U.S. Army soldier and Medal of Honor recipient	Born	
Chester Nez	1921–2014	Navajo code talker	Resident	
Louis R. Rocco	1938–2002	U.S. Army soldier and Medal of Honor recipient	Born	
Carmelita Vigil-Schimmenti	1936–	U.S. Air Force brigadier general	Born	

== Music ==
=== Individuals ===
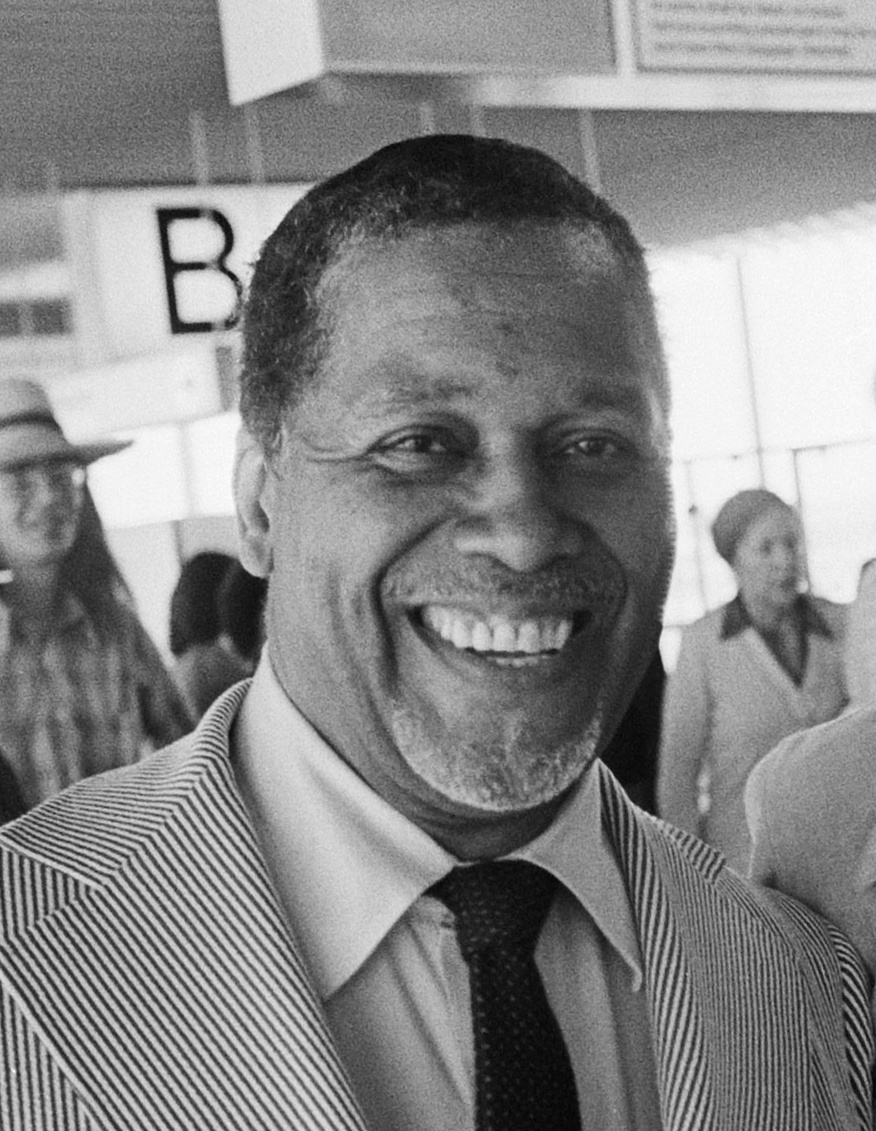
John Lewis, jazz pianist

Person	Lifespan	Notability	Connection	Ref.
Claude Albright	1873–1923	Operatic mezzo-soprano	Raised; resident	
Rahim AlHaj	c. 1968–	Oud player	Resident	
Lorenzo Antonio	1969–	Latin singer	Born and raised; resident	
Jeremy Barnes	1976–	Drummer and multi-instrumentalist for Neutral Milk Hotel and A Hawk and a Hacksaw	Born and raised; resident	
Randy Castillo	1950–2002	Drummer for Ozzy Osbourne and Mötley Crüe	Born and raised	
Raven Chacon	1977–	Pulitzer Prize winning composer	Raised; resident	
Zach Condon	1986–	Multi-instrumentalist and frontman for Beirut	Born	
Martin Crandall	1975–	Keyboard and bass player for The Shins	Born and raised	
Héctor García	1930–2022	Classical guitarist	Resident	
Al Hurricane	1936–2017	New Mexico music singer-songwriter	Raised; resident	
Al Hurricane Jr.	1959–	New Mexico music singer-songwriter	Born and raised; resident	
Sondra Isaminger	1958–2008	Singer and community leader	Resident	
John Lewis	1920–2001	Jazz pianist and founder of the Modern Jazz Quartet	Raised	
Demi Lovato	1992–	Singer, songwriter, and actor	Born	
Ryan McGarvey	1986–	Blues rock singer, guitarist and songwriter	Born	
John Donald Robb	1892–1989	Composer and ethnomusicologist	Resident	
Jesse Sandoval	1974–	Drummer for The Shins	Born and raised	
Bobby Shew	1941–	Jazz trumpeter	Born and raised	
Z. Randall Stroope	1953–	Composer	Born	
Heather Trost	1982–	Violinist for A Hawk and a Hacksaw	Born and raised; resident	
Xzibit	1974–	Rapper and actor	Raised	
Lauren Zhang	2001–	Pianist	Born	

=== Groups ===
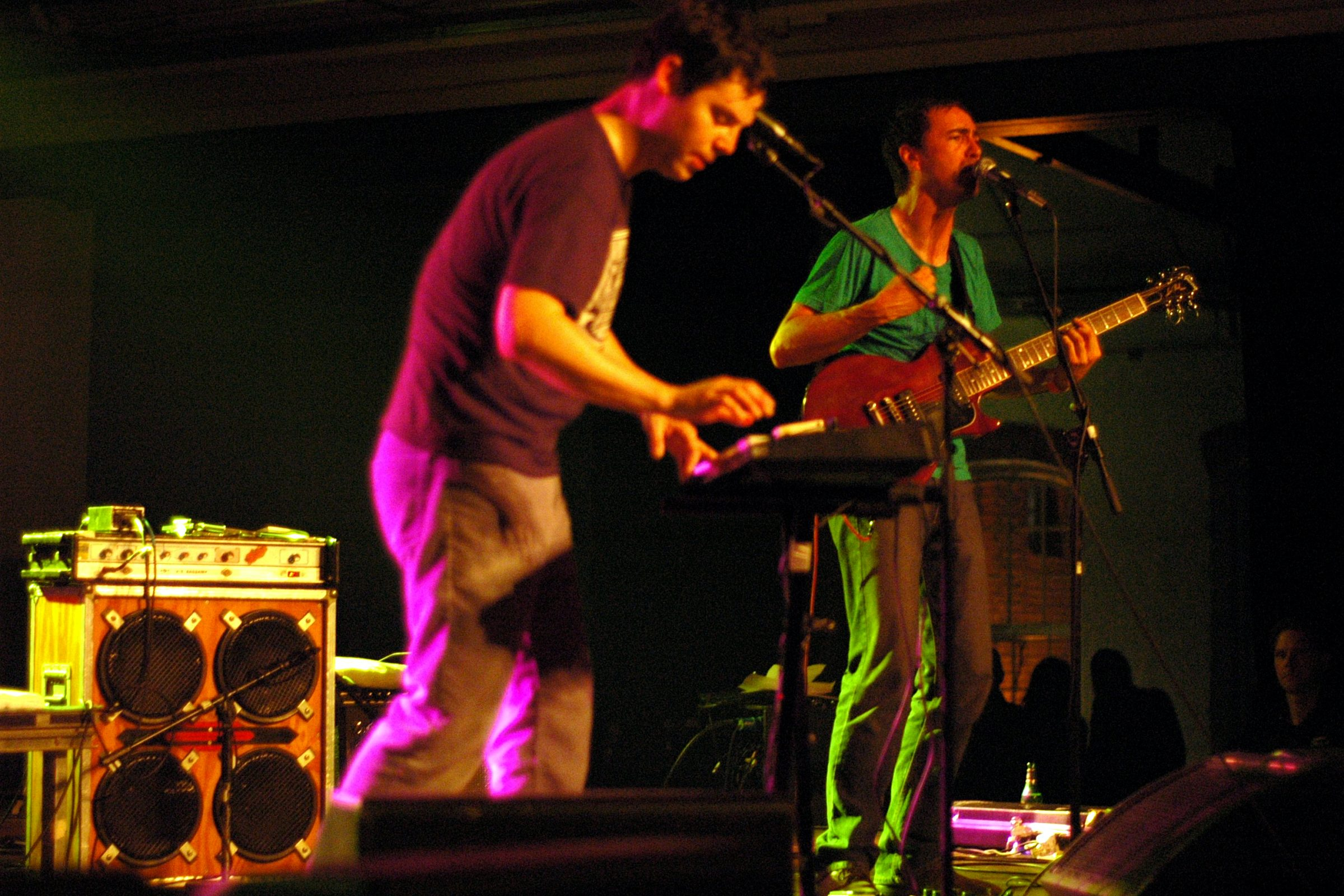
The Shins

Group	Formed	Notability	Ref.
Brokencyde	2006	Crunkcore group	
The Eyeliners	1995	Pop punk band	
Femme Fatale	1987	Glam metal band	
A Hawk and a Hacksaw	2001	Indie folk band	
Hazeldine	1996	Alternative country band	
Henry's Dress	1992	Punk Indie band	
The Rondelles	1995	Indie rock band	
Scared of Chaka	1993	Pop punk band	
The Shins	1997	Indie rock band	
Sparx	1982	Latin band	
Xit	1967	Native American rock band	

== Sports ==
=== Baseball ===
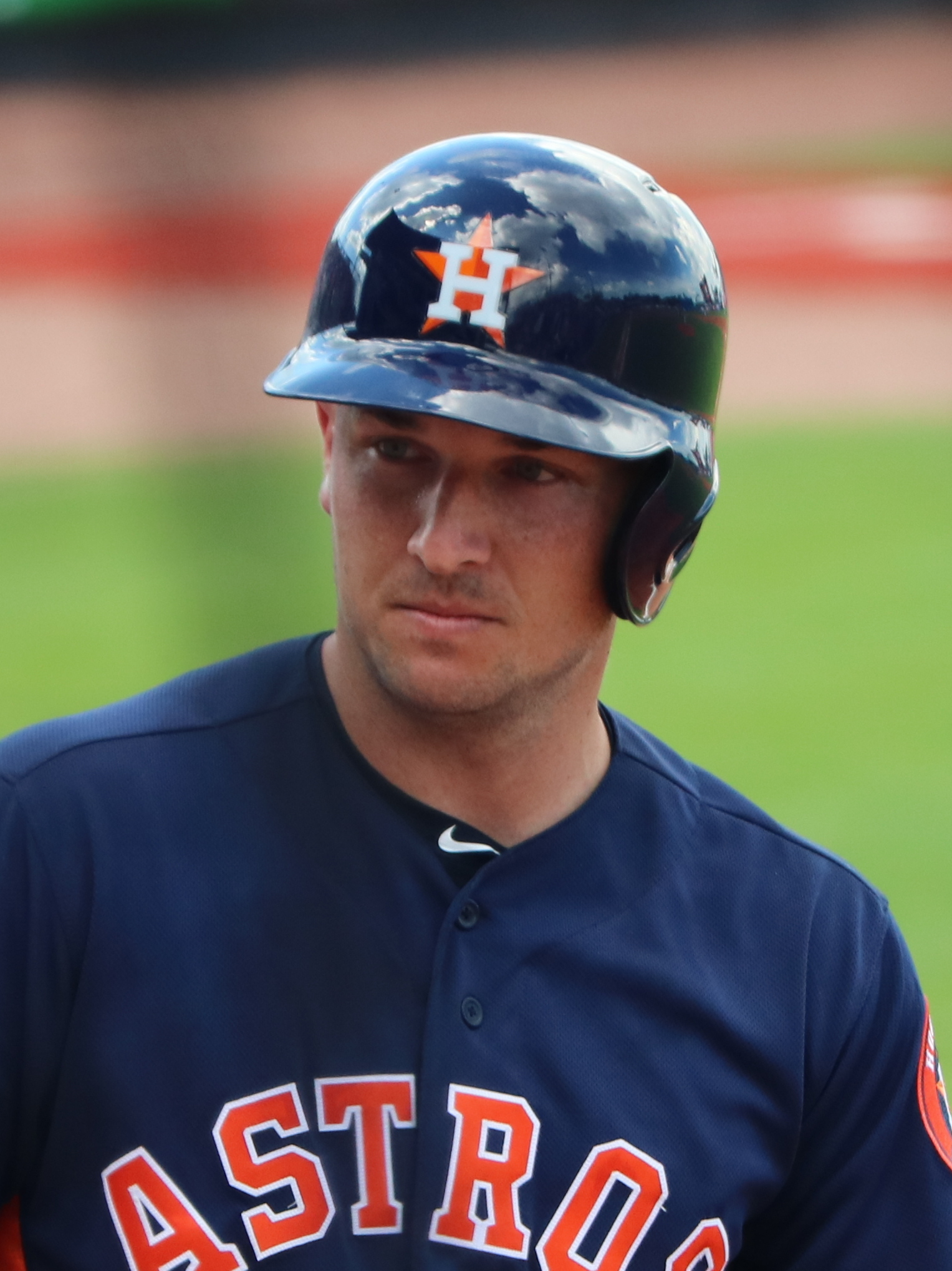
Alex Bregman

Person	Lifespan	Notability	Connection	Ref.
Alex Bregman	1994–	Chicago Cubs third baseman	Born and raised	
Corinne Clark	1928–2006	All-American Girls Professional Baseball League player	Resident	
Chris Cron	1964–	MLB player and minor league manager	Born	
Mitch Garver	1991–	Minnesota Twins catcher	Born and raised	
Ken Giles	1990–	Toronto Blue Jays pitcher	Born and raised	
Fred Haney	1896–1977	MLB player and manager	Born	
Tito Landrum	1954–	MLB outfielder	Raised	
Randy McCament	1962–	MLB pitcher	Born	
Jordan Pacheco	1986–	MLB infielder and catcher	Born and raised	
Christian Parker	1975–	New York Yankees pitcher	Born and raised	
Mitchell Parker	1999–	Washington Nationals pitcher	Born and raised	
James Parr	1986–	Atlanta Braves pitcher	Born and raised	
Mike Vento	1978–	MLB outfielder	Born and raised	
Kyle Weiland	1986–	MLB pitcher	Born and raised	

=== Basketball ===
Person	Lifespan	Notability	Connection	Ref.
Scott Bamforth	1989–	Basketball player	Born and raised	
James Borrego	1977–	Charlotte Hornets head coach	Born and raised	
A. J. Bramlett	1977–	NBA basketball player	Raised	
Christian Cunningham	1997–	basketball player	Raised	
Michael Holyfield	1992–	Basketball player	Born and raised	
T. J. Holyfield	1995–	Basketball player	Born and raised	
Gary Suiter	1944–1982	First person from Albuquerque to play in the NBA	Raised	
Cody Toppert	1983–	Basketball player and coach	Born and raised	

=== Combat sports ===
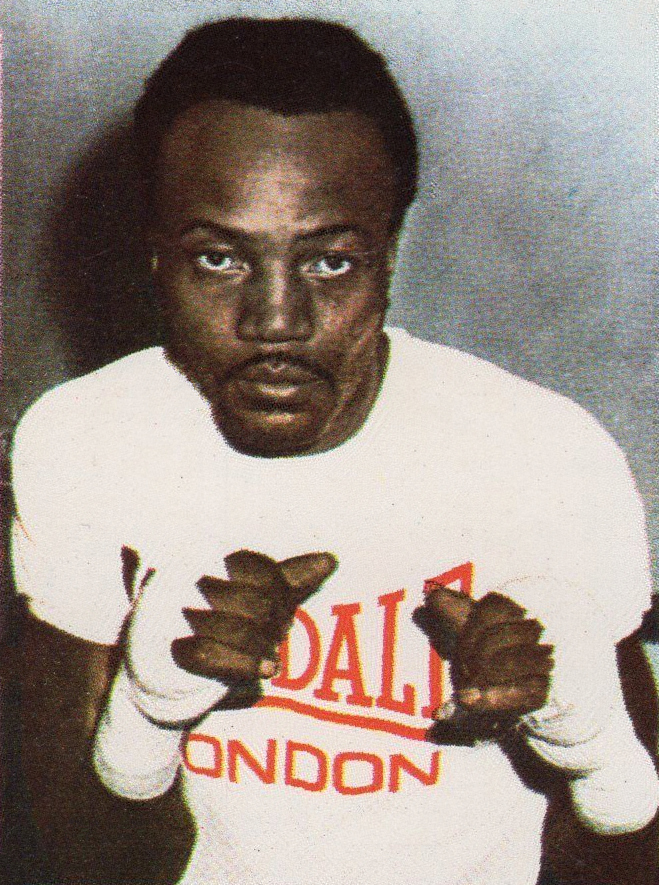
Bob Foster, boxer

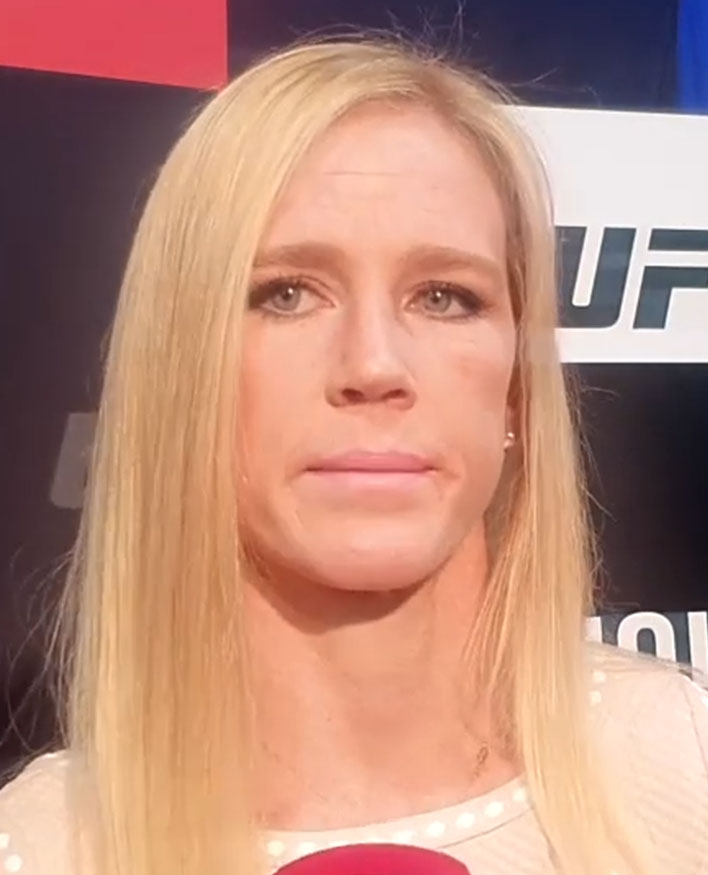
Holly Holm, boxer and mixed martial artist

Person	Lifespan	Notability	Connection	Ref.
Ray Borg	1993–	Mixed martial artist	Resident	
Brenda Burnside	1963–	Boxer	Born; resident	
Victoria Cisneros	1985–	Boxer	Resident	
Carlos Condit	1984–	Mixed martial artist	Born and raised	
John Dodson	1984–	Mixed martial artist	Born and raised	
Jordan Espinosa	1989–	Mixed martial artist	Resident	
Jodie Esquibel	1986–	Boxer and mixed martial artist	Born and raised	
Bob Foster	1938–2015	Boxer	Raised; resident	
Holly Holm	1981–	Boxer and mixed martial artist	Born and raised; resident	
Greg Jackson	1974–	Mixed martial arts trainer	Raised; resident	
Stephanie Jaramillo	1982–	Boxer	Born and raised; resident	
Jon Jones	1987–	Mixed martial artist	Resident	
Angelo Leo	1994–	Boxer	Born and raised	
Damacio Page	1982–	Mixed martial artist	Born and raised	
Danny Romero	1974–	Boxer	Born and raised	
Diego Sanchez	1981–	Mixed martial artist	Born and raised	
Johnny Tapia	1967–2012	Boxer	Born and raised; resident	

=== Football ===
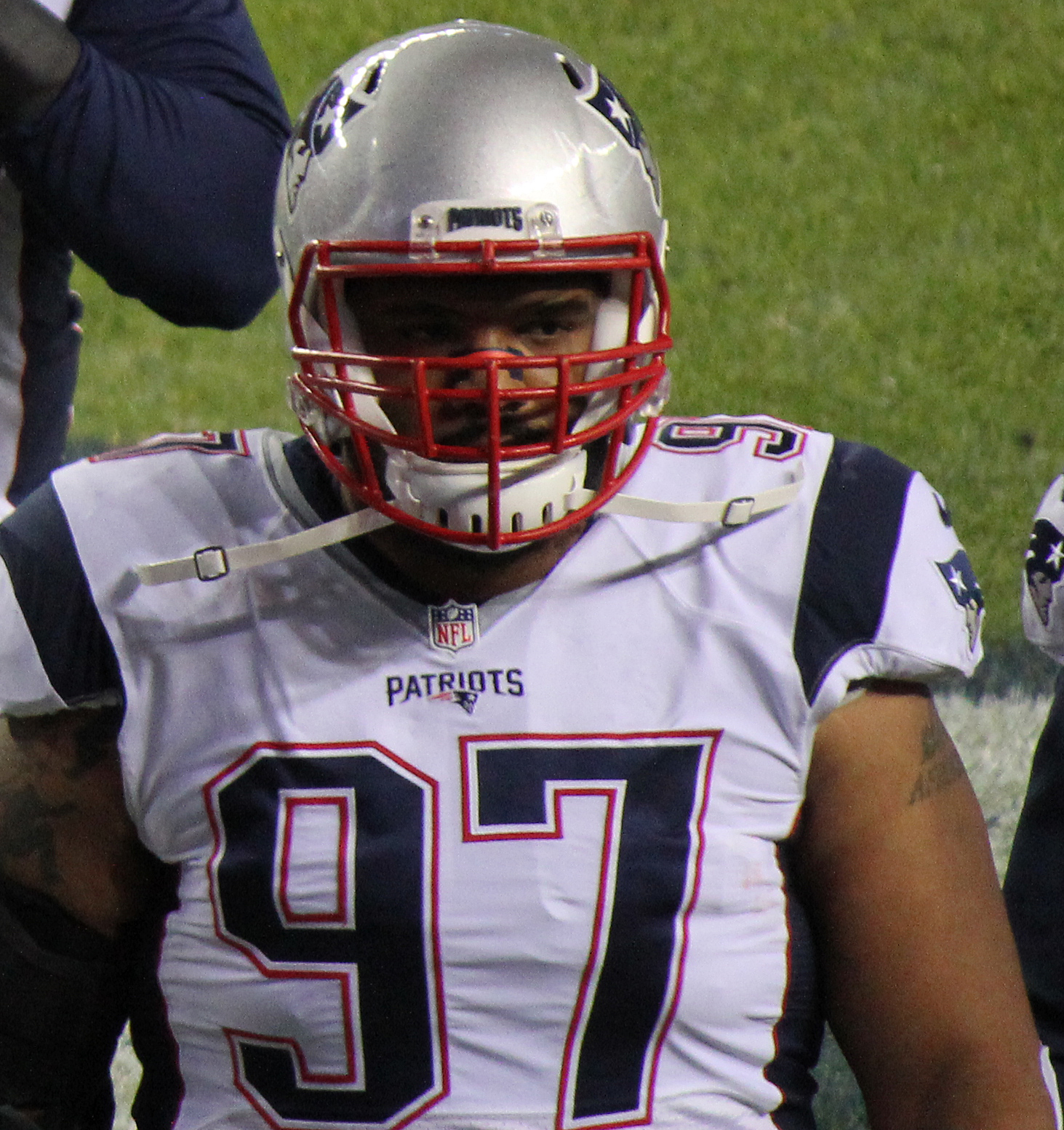
Alan Branch

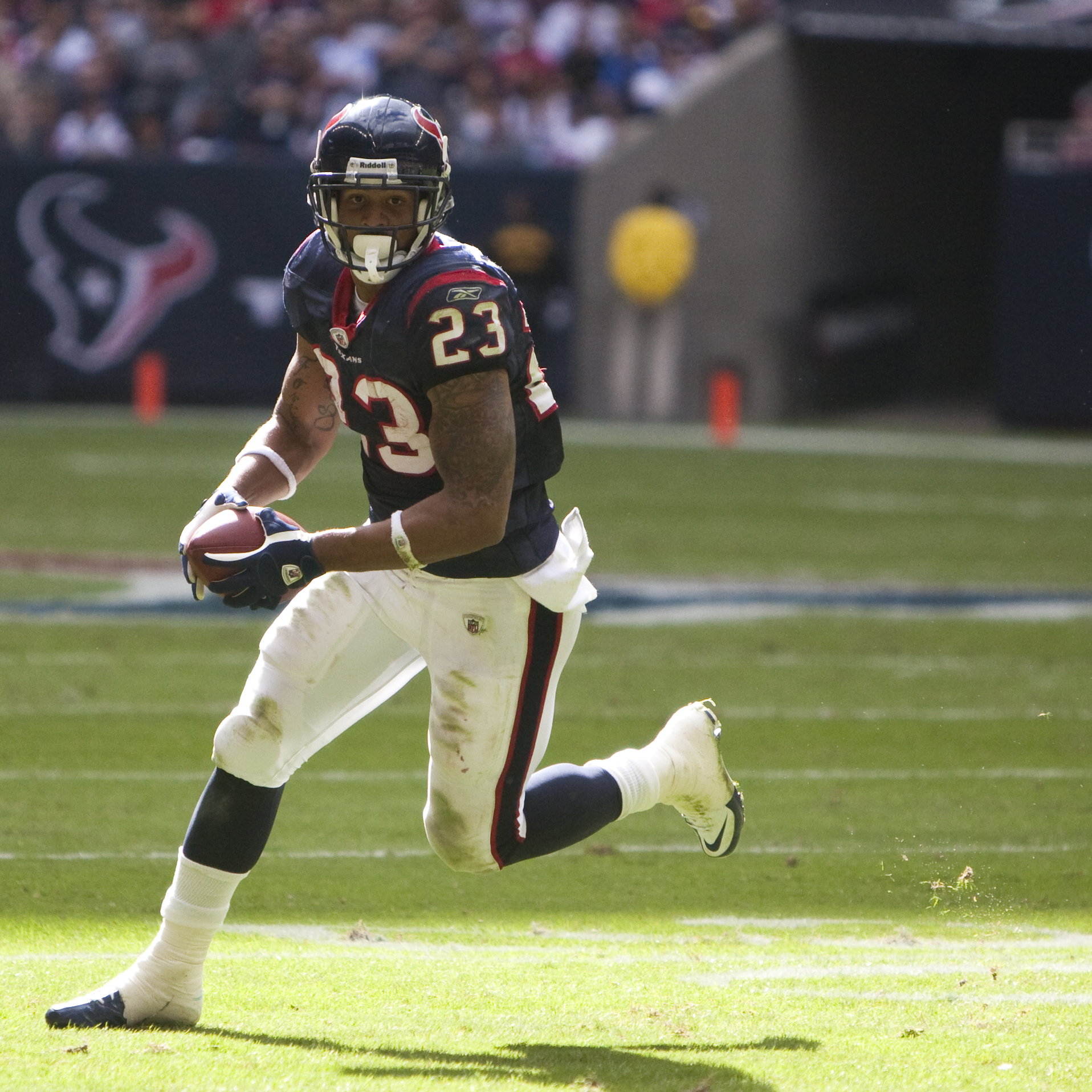
Arian Foster

Person	Lifespan	Notability	Connection	Ref.
Richard Angulo	1980–	NFL tight end and coach	Born and raised	
Alan Branch	1984–	NFL defensive tackle	Born and raised	
Erik Cook	1987–	NFL center	Born and raised	
Ryan Cook	1983–	NFL center	Born and raised	
Carlos Etheredge	1970–	NFL tight end	Born and raised	
Jim Everett	1963–	NFL quarterback	Raised	
Arian Foster	1986–	NFL running back	Born and raised	
Zach Gentry	1996–	NFL tight end	Born and raised	
Danny Gonzales	1976–	New Mexico Lobos head football coach	Born and raised	
Jake Ingram	1985–	NFL long snapper	Born	
Ronnie Lott	1959–	Hall of Fame NFL defensive back	Born	
Don Perkins	1938–	NFL running back	Resident	
Nick Speegle	1981–	NFL linebacker	Born and raised; resident	

=== Motorsports ===
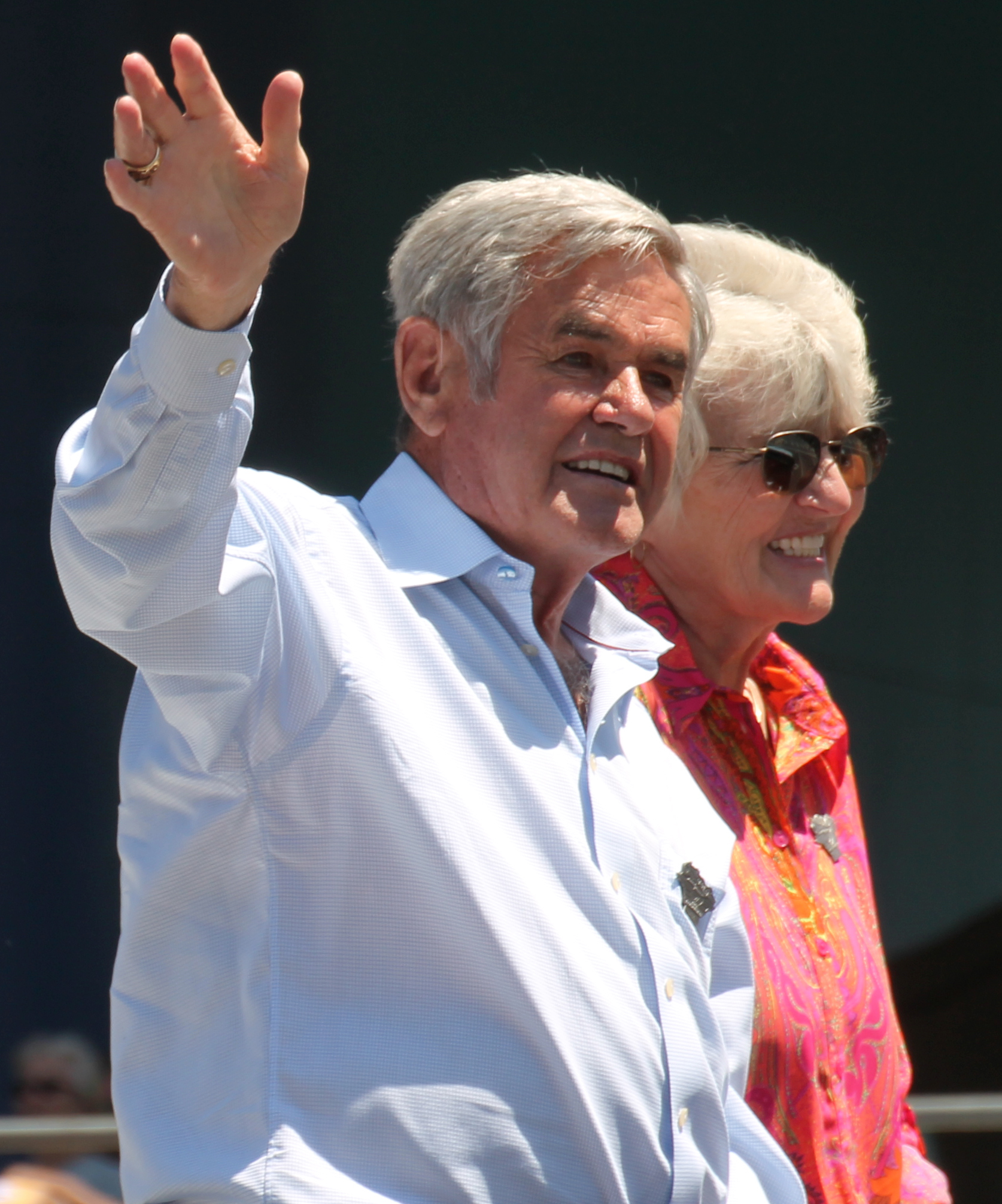
Al Unser, race car driver

Person	Lifespan	Notability	Connection	Ref.
Samuel Fastle	1995–	International motorcycle trials rider	Born and raised	
Jamie Galles	1972–	Race car driver	Born and raised	
Jim Guthrie	1961–	Race car driver	Resident	
Sean Guthrie	1988–	Race car driver	Born and raised	
Rachel Hassler	1995–	International motorcycle trials rider	Born and raised	
Caitlin Shaw	1989–	Stock car racing driver	Born and raised	
Al Unser	1939–2021	Race car driver	Born and raised; resident	
Al Unser Jr.	1962–	Race car driver	Born and raised; resident	
Bobby Unser	1934–2021	Race car driver	Raised; resident	
Robby Unser	1968–	Race car driver	Born and raised	

=== Soccer ===
Person	Lifespan	Notability	Connection	Ref.
Ubusuku Abukusumo	1977–	Defender	Born	
Kyle Altman	1986–	Defender	Born and raised	
Brianna Martinez	2000–	Defender	Born and raised	
Brandon Moss	1984–	Midfielder	Born and raised	
Ford Parker	1996–	Goalkeeper	Born and raised	
Tammy Pearman	1973–	Defender	Raised	
Sergio Rivas	1997–	Midfielder	Raised	
Devon Sandoval	1991–	Forward	Born and raised	

=== Other sports ===
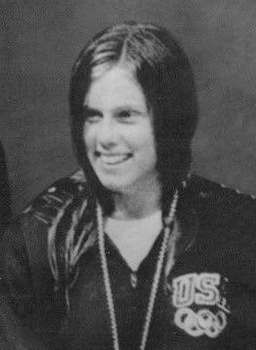
Cathy Carr, swimmer

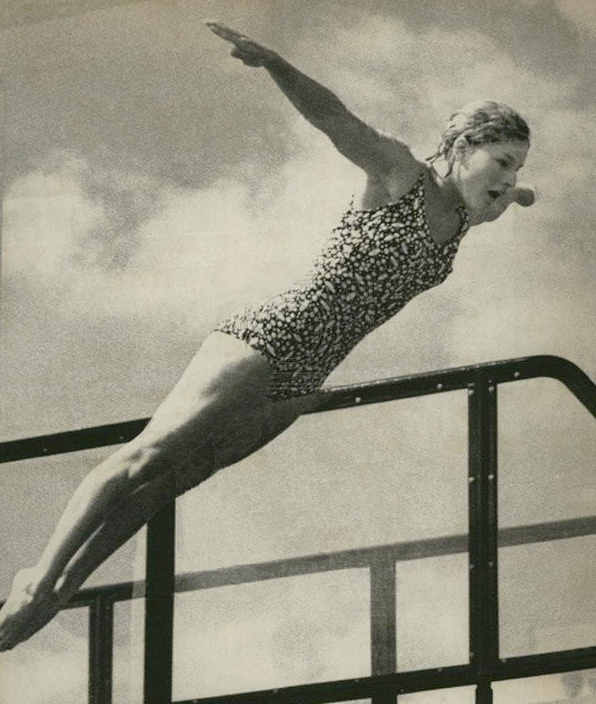
Janet Ely, diver

Person	Lifespan	Notability	Connection	Ref.
John Baker	1944–1970	Runner	Raised; resident	
Dave Barney	1932–	Swimming coach and educator at Albuquerque Academy	Resident	
Curtis Beach	1990–	Decathlete	Born and raised	
Notah Begay III	1972–	PGA golfer	Born and raised	
Brent Bookwalter	1984–	Cyclist	Born	
Shelia Burrell	1972–	Olympic heptathlete	Born	
Cathy Carr	1954–	Swimmer and Olympic gold medalist	Born and raised	
Allen Church	1928–2019	Skiing official	Resident	
Beth Coats	1966–	Olympic biathlete	Born and raised	
Wil Collins	1978–	PGA golfer	Resident	
Trent Dimas	1970–	Gymnast and Olympic gold medalist	Born and raised	
Mariah Duran	1996–	Skateboarder	Born and raised	
Janet Ely	1953–	Olympic diver	Born and raised	
Tim Garcia	1955–	Tennis player	Raised	
Carla Garrett	1967–	Olympic discus thrower and weightlifter	Born	
Joseph Hagerty	1982–	Gymnast and Olympic bronze medalist	Born and raised	
Pat Henry	1951–	Collegiate track and field coach	Born and raised	
Mbarak Hussein	1965–	Distance runner	Resident	
Kent Jones	1967–	PGA golfer	Resident	
Kathrin Keil	1962–	Tennis player	Raised	
Gina Kim	2000–	Golfer	Born	
David Livingston	1962–	Tennis player	Born and raised	
Austin Menaul	1888–1975	Track and field athlete and Olympic pentathlete	Born	
Cowboy Jimmy Moore	1910–1999	Pool player	Resident	
Buster Quist	1936–	Javelin thrower	Resident	
Jarrin Solomon	1986–	Sprinter and Olympic bronze medalist	Born and raised; resident	
Willie Tucker	1872–1954	Professional golfer and golf course architect	Resident	
Chainey Umphrey	1970–	Olympic gymnast	Born and raised	

== Writing ==
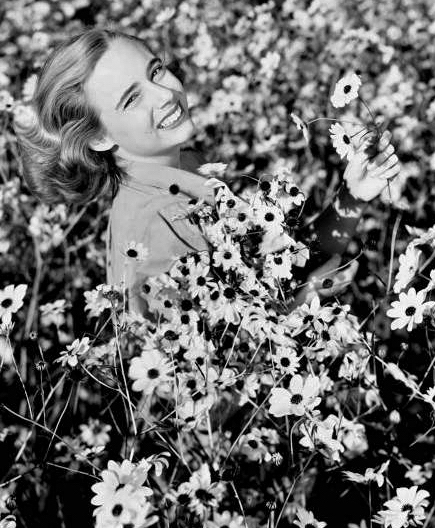
Lois Duncan, writer

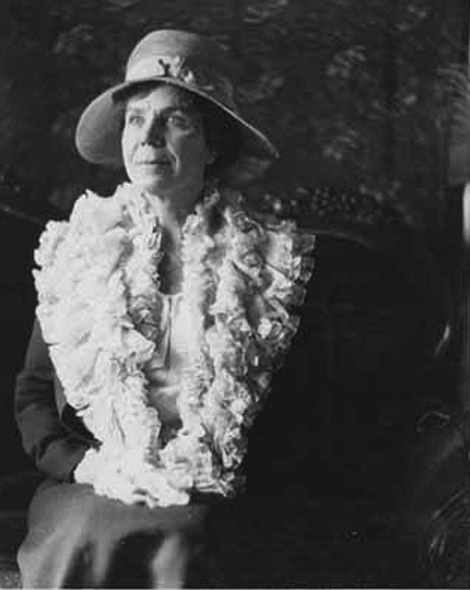
Erna Fergusson, writer

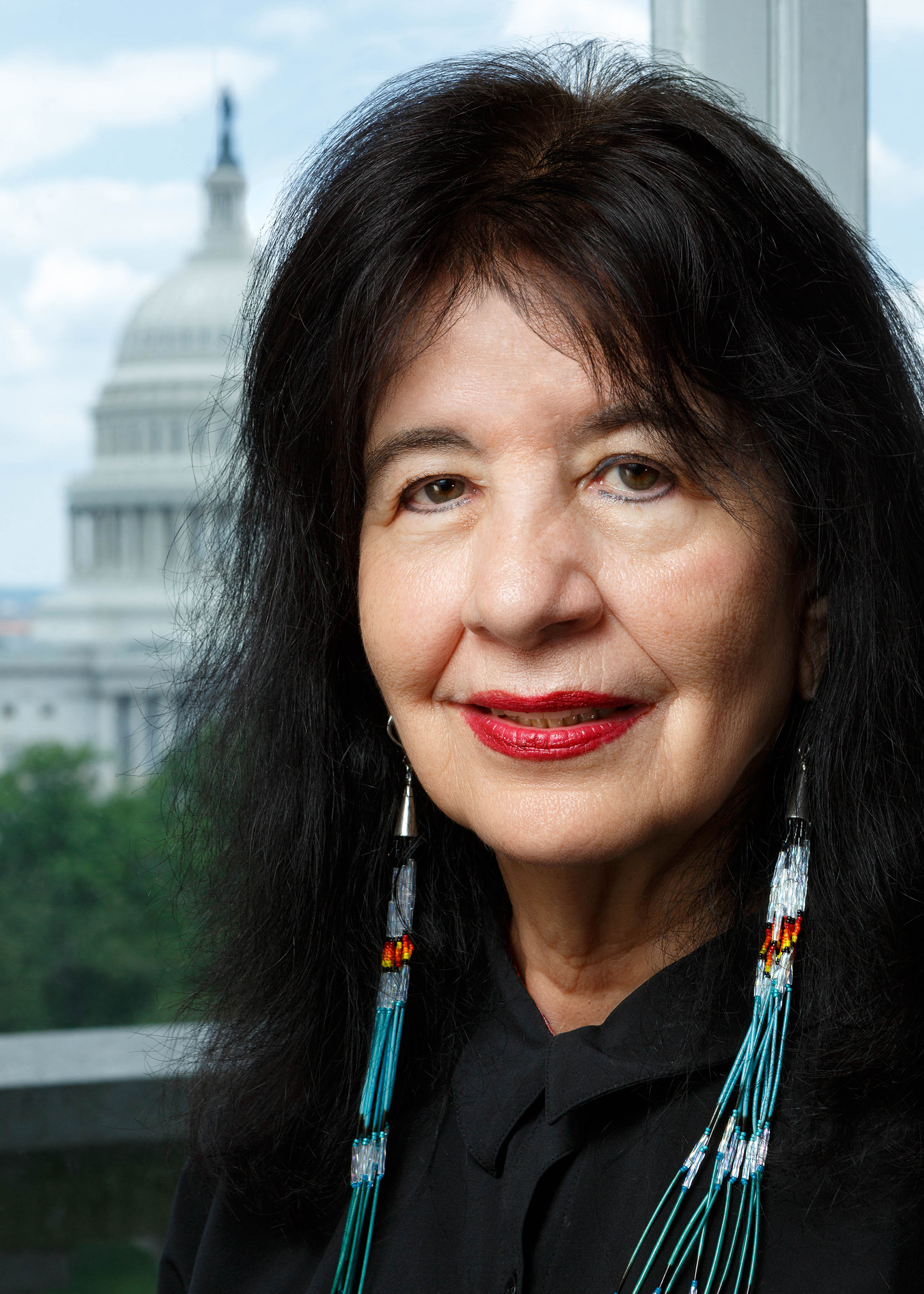
Joy Harjo, poet

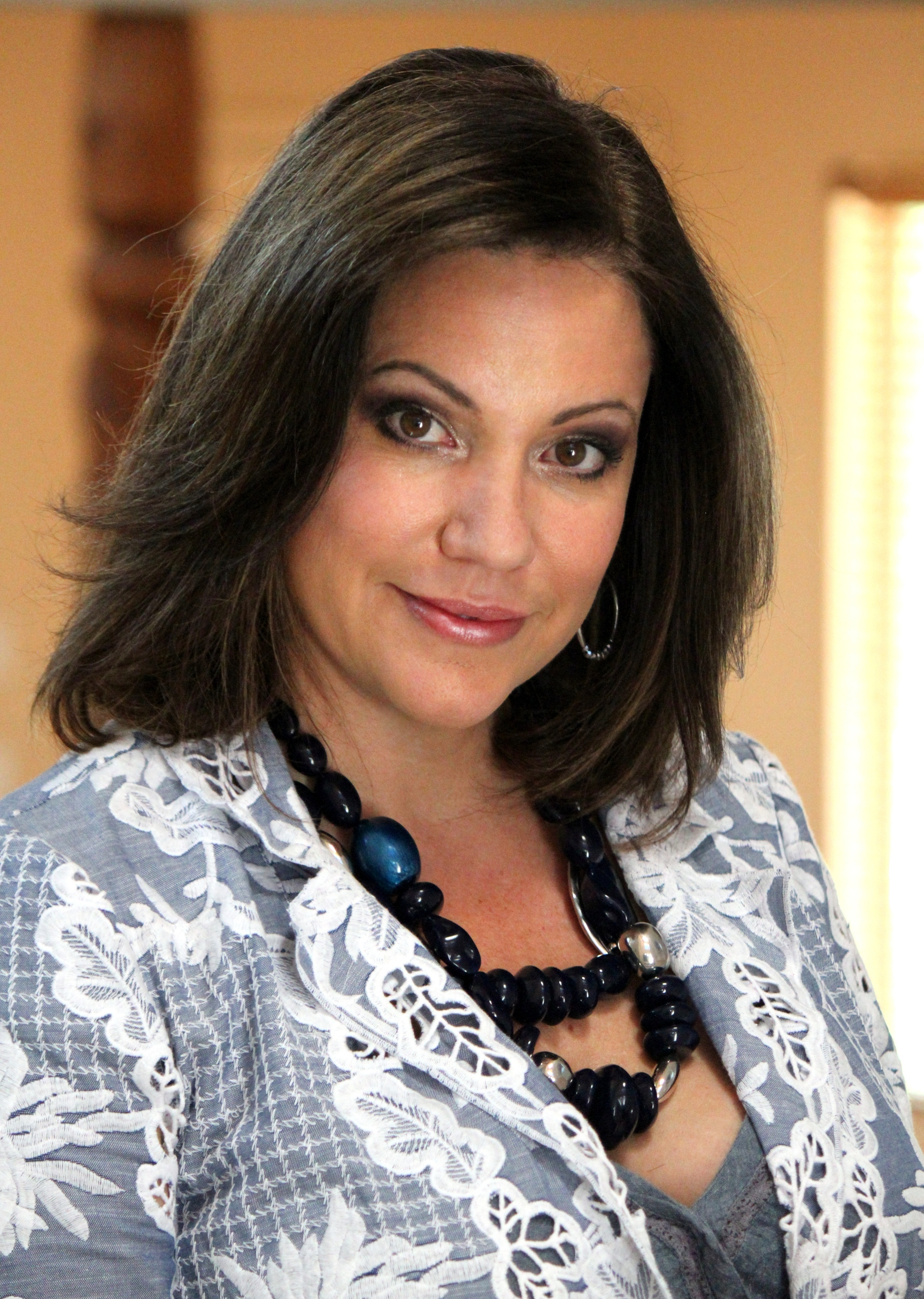
Alisa Valdes, writer

Person	Lifespan	Notability	Connection	Ref.
Daniel Abraham	1969–	Science fiction and fantasy writer	Born and raised; resident	
Paula Gunn Allen	1939–2008	Writer and poet	Born	
Rudolfo Anaya	1937–2020	Writer	Resident	
Louis Bayard	1963–	Writer	Born	
Suzy McKee Charnas	1939–2023	Science fiction and fantasy writer	Resident	
Robert Crichton	1925–1993	Writer	Born	
Mel Dinelli	1912–1991	Screenwriter and playwright	Born and raised	
Stephen R. Donaldson	1947–	Science fiction and fantasy writer	Resident	
Lois Duncan	1934–2016	Young adult fiction writer	Resident	
Max Evans	1924–2020	Western writer	Resident	
Erna Fergusson	1888–1964	Writer	Born and raised; resident	
Harvey Fergusson	1890–1971	Writer	Born and raised	
Kendrick Frazier	1942–2022	Science writer and editor of Skeptical Inquirer magazine	Resident	
Olivia Gatwood	1992–	Poet	Born and raised	
Steven Gould	1955–	Science fiction writer	Resident	
Joy Harjo	1951–	Writer and U.S. Poet Laureate	Resident	
Tony Hillerman	1925–2008	Mystery writer	Resident	
Mira Jacob	1973–	Writer	Born and raised	
Betsy James		Children's literature writer and illustrator	Resident	
Larry Johnson	1960–	Writer and cryonics whistleblower	Born and raised	
Susan Krinard		Paranormal romance and fantasy writer	Resident	
J.M.G. Le Clézio	1940–	Writer	Resident	
Jane Lindskold	1962–	Fantasy and science fiction writer	Resident	
Carolyn Meyer	1935–	Young adult fiction writer	Resident	
Victor Milán	1954–2018	Science fiction writer	Raised; resident	
Laura J. Mixon	1957–	Science fiction writer	Resident	
Steven T. Murray	1943–2018	Literary translator	Resident	
Tiina Nunnally	1952–	Literary translator	Resident	
Simon J. Ortiz	1941–	Writer and poet	Born	
Kathryn Ptacek	1952–	Horror writer	Raised	
Kirstin Valdez Quade		Writer	Born	
Leroy Quintana	1944–	Poet	Born	
Lois Ruby	c. 1950–	Writer	Resident	
Fred Saberhagen	1930–2007	Science fiction writer	Resident	
Leslie Marmon Silko	1948–	Writer	Born	
Lauren Tarshis	1963–	Children's literature writer	Born	
Alisa Valdes	1969–	Writer and journalist	Born and raised; resident	
Robert E. Vardeman	1947–	Science fiction and fantasy writer	Resident	
Sage Walker		Science fiction writer	Resident	
Harry Willson	1932–2010	Writer	Resident	
Jay Wright	1935–	Poet	Born	
Rhiana Yazzie		Playwright	Born	

== Miscellaneous ==
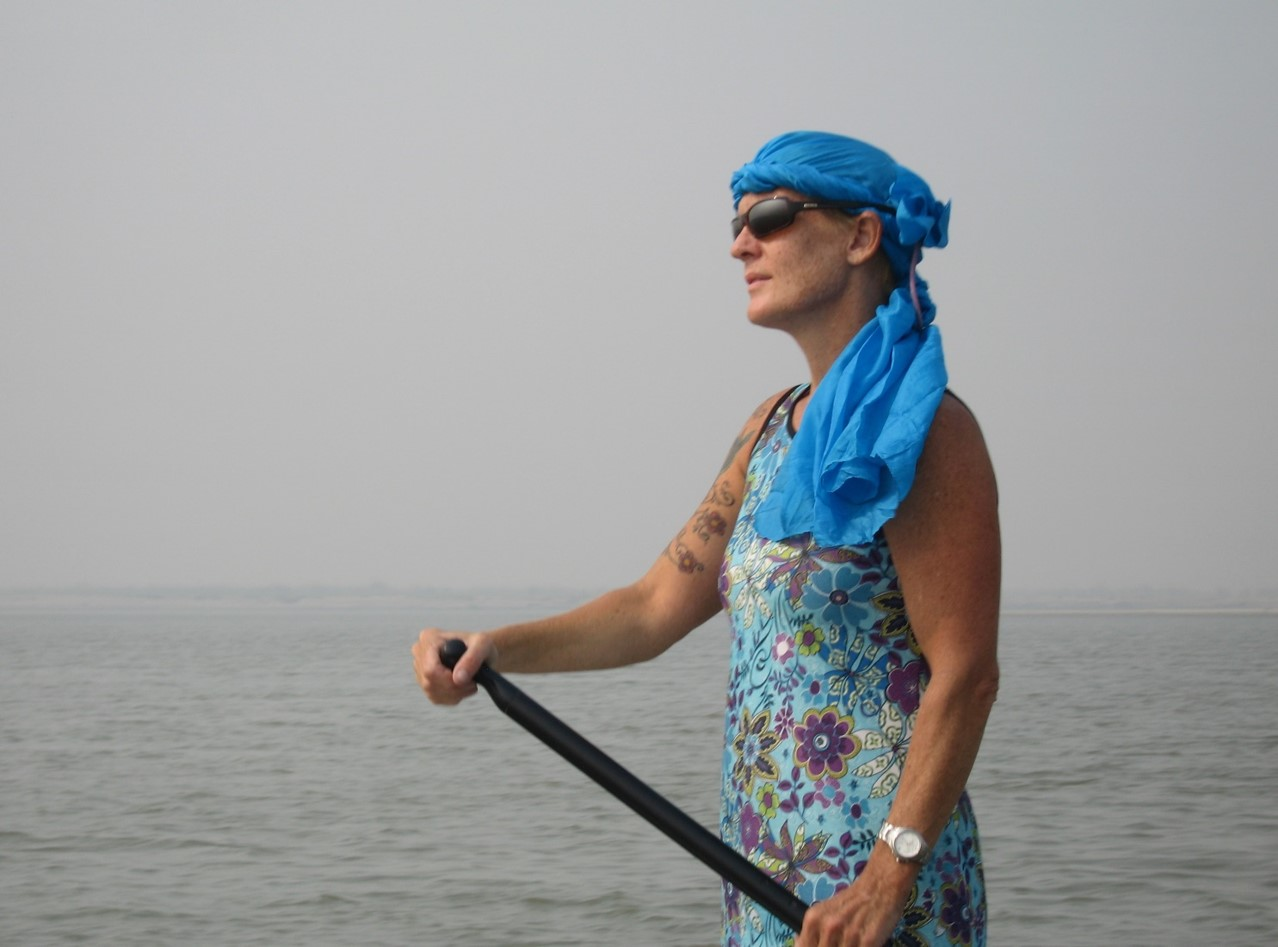
Lady Ganga

Person	Lifespan	Notability	Connection	Ref.
David Dowler	1953–	Serial killer	Born and raised	
Francisco Martin Duran	1968–	Attempted presidential assassin	Born and raised	
Barbara Edwards	1960–	Model, 1984 Playboy Playmate of the Year	Born	
Alphonse Gallegos	1931–1991	Roman Catholic bishop, Servant of God (viz, being investigated for sainthood in Catholicism)	Born	
Lady Ganga	1966–2012	Humanitarian	Resident	
Daniel G. P. Gutierrez	1964–	Episcopal bishop	Born and raised	
Kalorie Karbdashian-Williams	1990 or 1991–	Drag queen	Resident	
Cissy King	1946–	Dancer, featured performer on The Lawrence Welk Show	Raised	
Joe Mande	1983–	Comedian and TV writer	Born	
Marc Maron	1963–	Comedian and podcaster	Raised	
Ishmael Muhammad	1964–	Minister in the Nation of Islam	Born	
Mark Rudd	1947–	Activist and Weather Underground member	Resident	
