= Oskar D'Amico =

Italian artist

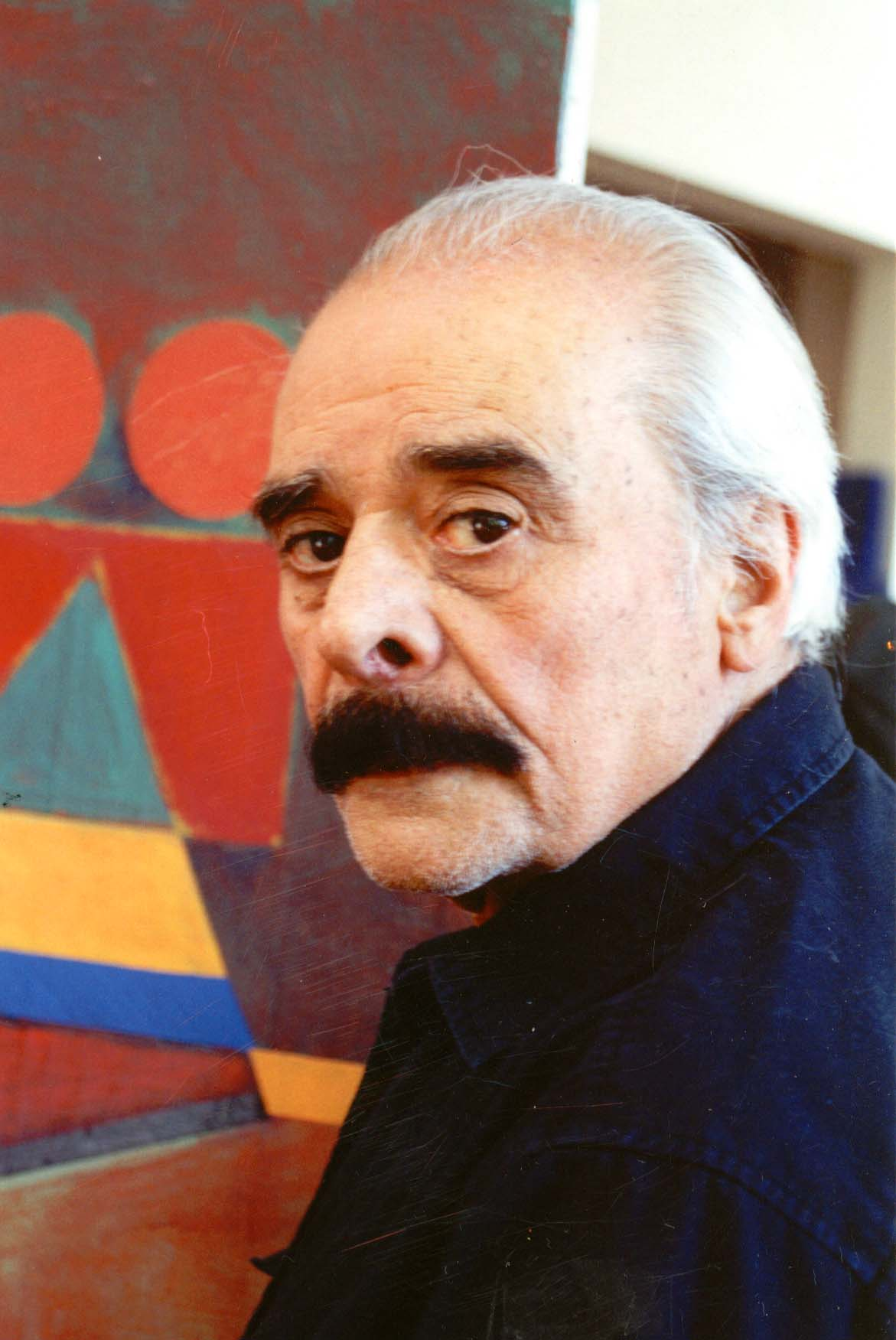
- D'Amico in 1979
- Born: Oscar Maria D'amico; February 22, 1923; Castel Frentano, Italy
- Died: May 3, 2003 (aged 80); Albuquerque, New Mexico, U.S.
- Known for: Painting
- Movement: Expressionism; abstract art;

Oskar Maria D'Amico (February 22, 1923 – May 3, 2003) was an Italian artist. He is considered a Nomad artist because of his ability to work in various styles. He had three major periods in his artistic life: Figurative, Materic and Geometric. He also was an outstanding art director for more than 75 epic movies.

D'Amico had a very outgoing personality. He was a non-conformist, which was reflected in his work throughout his life. D'Amico was born in Castel Frentano, Italy, a small village in Abruzzo. At a young age, he felt he had to leave and dive into the big world. After being a seminarist with the Salesiani during World War II, he left Naples, where he studied architecture, and began a great adventure in Rome.

D'Amico was active in Rome, Naples, Lanciano, Cisterna, Milan, Gallarate, Turin, Zagreb, Paris, Toulouse, Melun, Carennac, Maubeuge, Madrid, Barcelona, Zaragoza, Budapest, Győr, Mexico City, Cuernavaca, Morelia, Toronto, New York City, Philadelphia, Los Angeles, San Francisco, Miami, Denver, Santa Fe, Albuquerque and Socorro, between 1943 and 2003.

== Film Art Director ==
He specialized at the time in decorating nightclubs and bars, and invented a special type of double ceiling to hide the lights. D'Amico, who was self-taught as a teenager in drawing and painting, burst onto the filmmaking scene in Rome when an art director asked him to do a perspective of a set design. Soon other moviemakers were calling him.

D'Amico was an art director on 75 films including two by Orson Welles. D’Amico was able to create a real marble floor in the set of the palace of the King Saul, in "David and Goliath" directed by Orson Welles. Art directors previously painted a simulated marble on top of concrete due to the cost of the real thing. D'Amico became an associate of Jadran Films in ex-Yugoslavia, which specialized in Roman and Egyptian constructions.

== Career as an artist ==
While an art director, he never stopped painting. His faceless clowns, reflecting the people who had no identity after World War II, were a big success. In the early 1960s, D'Amico moved with his family to Toronto, Canada, another place he felt was too small. He left for Philadelphia and New York City, which affected his work. He turned his focus to abstract, and for more than a decade created abstract Expressionist paintings "on the plane of all matter" that he called "Materic".

The Materic style, which he invented, was done in several media and could not be changed once on the canvas. The paintings were very well received. D’Amico sold more than 400 in Philadelphia and New York City. Unfortunately he had to stop doing the Materics because the colors he used were harmful to his liver.

In the mid 1970s, he returned to his architectural roots and developed a new vision for Abstract Constructivism using just acrylic colors. Presented in Paris by his French Art dealer, Francoise Tournier, at the Grand Palais de Paris, and in Mexico City, D'Amico's interpretation of the "New Geometry" was widely admired. In 1983, when he presented the work at the Bodley Gallery, people whispered that he had the potential to be the new Picasso because of his eclecticism and the Nomad nature of his styles.

== Later career ==
In 1987, D'Amico abandoned the gypsy life and settled in New Mexico. Albuquerque was the perfect place to dedicate himself 100 percent to his work. There were no distractions and a good climate that reminded him of his beloved Cuernavaca in Mexico. Staying in close contact with his French art dealer Tournier, D’Amico had several shows in Denver at the Helen Karsh Gallery and in Albuquerque at the Black Swan and Café Galleries.

At least once a year, D’Amico went to Europe to immerse himself in the antique world and visit museums and galleries. In 1992, visiting Tournier at the Castle of Saint Cirq Lapopie, he met the man who founded the MADI movement in 1940, Carmelo Arden Quin. D’Amico aligned himself with MADI because he had been working for years in multi-media with an abstract, geometric focus. D’Amico established the first MADI gallery in the U.S.,Arte Struktura International Gallery, where he gathered all artists working in the same style and encouraged them to do group shows within the MADI rules.

In 1998, D’Amico’s health declined and he gave up the gallery. His many years of using toxic paints caught up with his liver, and he had energy only to do his own work. He painted up to the last day he was able to stand or sit, and always said that he lived off art and love. D’Amico was very successful in France, where people are known to be critical of artists, especially if those from the U.S. D’Amico was a naturalized U.S. citizen. He had several shows in France, starting in Paris and to the south.

== Legacy ==
Claude l’Houmeau wrote in “Le Figaro:” “D’Amico is an experienced traveler along the intricate pathways of painting, having thus obtained a good formula which he ably exploits with his surprising virtuosity. Having been also an architect, he is able to construct perfectly and to maintain the balance and rhythm within his compositions which can be literally moved back and forth, up and down, and continue to look well in any position."

John Tancock, director of Sotheby's Modern Art Department in New York City, said “… Every one of his works penetrates deeply into the axial composition and its interrelation is punctualized by the great divergency of color and tonality and the accumulated experience, by means of which D’Amico handles his vocabulary of forms. Thanks to the methodical and constant study D’Amico carried out, he produced a successful series of paintings which have taken on a new monumentality without impairing the vitality that is D’Amico’s main characteristic as a painter.”
