= Hal Olsen =

American painter

- Known for: Painting

Hal Olsen is an American artist living in Albuquerque, New Mexico. He was a U.S. Navy aviation mechanic working on autopilots who also worked at Los Alamos National Lab as an artist for official bomb designs. His work was featured in the first issue of National Geographic Magazine. He is also the last living American nose artist who painted during World War II.
