= Kendrick Frazier =

American science writer (1942–2022)

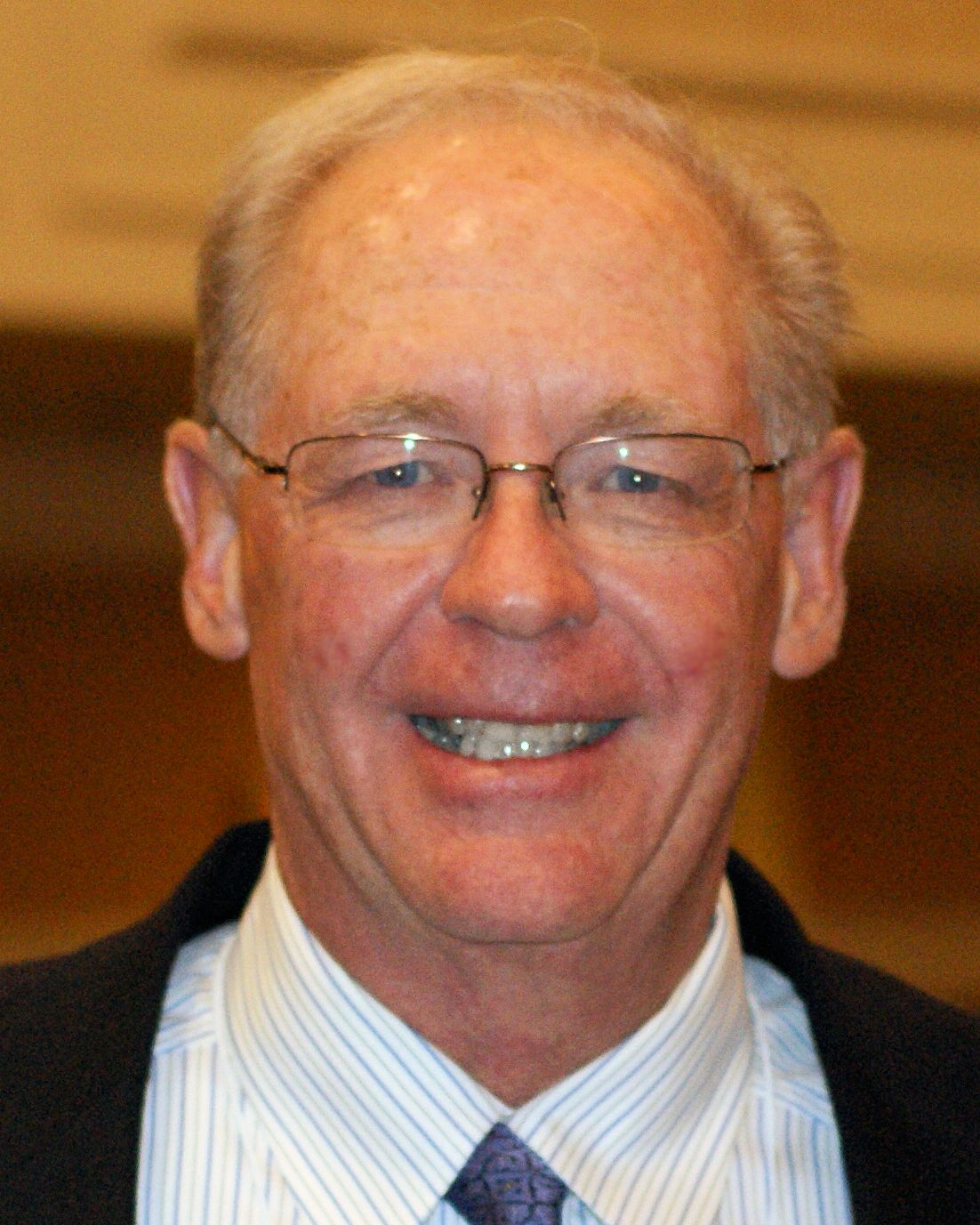
- Frazier at CSICon 2011
- Born: March 19, 1942; Windsor, Colorado, U.S.
- Died: November 7, 2022 (aged 80)
- Education: BA University of Colorado, 1964 MS Columbia University, 1966
- Occupations: Writer, editor
- Children: 2; including Michele
- Kendrick Frazier Voice recorded in January 2015

Kendrick Crosby Frazier (March 19, 1942 – November 7, 2022) was an American science writer and longtime editor of Skeptical Inquirer magazine. He was also a former editor of Science News, author or editor of ten books, and a Fellow of the American Association for the Advancement of Science (AAAS). He was a fellow and a member of the executive council of Committee for Skeptical Inquiry (CSI), an international organization that promotes scientific inquiry.

Frazier wrote extensively about a variety of science topics including astronomy, space exploration, the earth and planetary sciences, archaeology, technology, the history and philosophy of science, public issues of science, and the critical examination of pseudoscience and fringe science.

== Personal life ==
Frazier received a B.A. in Journalism from the University of Colorado and a M.S. in Journalism from Columbia University. He was a member of the National Association of Science Writers and the American Geophysical Union.

Frazier lived with his wife, Ruth, in Albuquerque, New Mexico. She is an international consultant in community development and a former president (1974–1997) of Futures for Children, an organization which works with American Indians of the Southwest. They have a son, Chris; their daughter, Michele a.k.a. Lady Ganga, died February 5, 2012, from cervical cancer, 2 1/2 months after completing a 700-mile expedition (called Starry Ganga) standup paddleboarding down the Ganges River in India to spread awareness about cervical cancer and its preventability and treatment.

Frazier died on November 7, 2022, at the age of 80.

== Career ==
Frazier was the earth sciences editor of Science News in 1969–70. He was named managing editor in 1970–71, then editor from 1971 to 1977, and remained a contributing editor until 1981. In December 1973 he traveled to Antarctica and the South Pole and wrote a series of articles reporting on the historic U.S. research into the continent's geologic and climatic history and the environmental impact of such research.

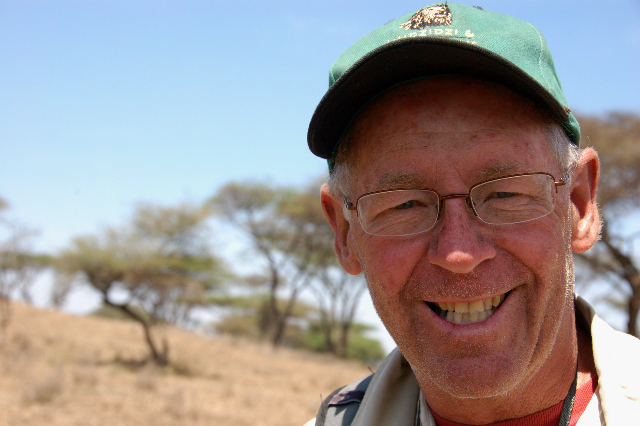
Kendrick Frazier roughing it in Tanzania wilderness

In 1976 Frazier reported on the organizing conference at which the Committee for the Scientific Investigation of Claims of the Paranormal, CSICOP, was founded. In a discussion with James Randi at CSICon 2016 regarding the founding of CSICOP, Frazier said that Isaac Asimov being associated with the organization "gave it immense status and authority" in his eyes.

The committee published a journal called The Zetetic featuring articles examining the claims of occultism and pseudoscientific theories. In August 1977 Frazier became the editor of the journal, and with the first issue of 1978 its name was changed to the Skeptical Inquirer.

Frazier wrote articles in every issue for forty-five years and participated in every national and international conference of the organization since 1977. Examples of his editor's columns and reports that feature popular science topics include The Winter of Our Discontent (about attacks on climate science), Why the Bem Experiments Are Not Parapsychology's Next Big Thing, Getting People Emotionally Invested, and The Roswell Syndrome....and Pseudoskepticism. His comprehensive history of CSICOP was published in The Encyclopedia of the Paranormal.

From 1983 to 2006, he concurrently worked as a full-time staff member at Sandia National Laboratories in Albuquerque, New Mexico, where he wrote about its research projects and for the last 11 years edited its award-winning newspaper, The Sandia Lab News. He retired as a Principal Member of Laboratory Staff.

One of Frazier's later books, Science Under Siege: Defending Science, Exposing Pseudoscience, was featured by Science News for its "engaging, insightful, and often surprising essays by researchers and journalists" about "what science is and is not, and what happens when the facts get twisted." Three prominent scientists gave testimonials about the book. Astrophysicist and author Neil deGrasse Tyson wrote "Science Under Siege is a welcome antidote to the profound science illiteracy that, today, permeates American pop culture and the press." Harvard University cognitive scientist and author Steven Pinker called the book "An entertaining and eye-opening collection of essays that advance the battle against ignorance and superstition." Williams College astronomer Jay M. Pasachoff said "Ken Frazier's collection brings a well-chosen selection of logical and well-reasoned pieces before a general audience that would enjoy and benefit from their analyses and exposés."

== Awards and honors ==
In 1985 the University of Colorado presented him with the George Norlin Award for outstanding achievement by an alumnus.

The American Humanist Association awarded Frazier the Humanist Pioneer Award in 1995 for his "effective worldwide advancement of rational skepticism".

Frazier received the In Praise of Reason Award, the highest honor from the Committee for the Scientific Investigation of Claims of the Paranormal in 2001. The award is given in recognition of distinguished contributions in the use of critical inquiry, scientific evidence, and reason in evaluating claims to knowledge. Other recipients of this award include Carl Sagan, Murray Gell-Mann, Stephen Jay Gould, Martin Gardner, Ray Hyman and Nobel laureate physicist Leon Lederman.

Frazier was elected a Fellow of the AAAS in 2005 for his "distinguished contributions to the public understanding of science through writing for and editing popular science magazines that emphasize science news and scientific reasoning and methods."

He was awarded CSI's Robert P. Balles Annual Prize in Critical Thinking at the 2024 CSICon convention. His widow Ruth Frazier accepted the award.

== Books ==
- The Violent Face of Nature: Severe Phenomena and Natural Disasters, by Kendrick Frazier, William Morrow, New York, 1979, ISBN 0-688-03528-0
- Paranormal Borderlands of Science, edited by Kendrick Frazier, Prometheus Books, 1981, ISBN 0-87975-148-7.
- Our Turbulent Sun, by Kendrick Frazier. Prentice Hall, 1982, ISBN 0-13-644492-X
- Solar System. By Kendrick Frazier and the Editors of Time-Life Books. Planet Earth Series. Time-Life Books, 1985, ISBN 0-7054-0755-1
- Science Confronts the Paranormal edited by Kendrick Frazier, Prometheus Books, 1986, ISBN 0-87975-314-5.
- The Hundredth Monkey: And Other Paradigms of the Paranormal, edited by Kendrick Frazier, 1991, Prometheus Books, ISBN 0-87975-655-1.
- The UFO Invasion: The Roswell Incident, Alien Abductions, and Government Coverups, edited by Kendrick Frazier, Barry Karr, and Joe Nickell, Prometheus Books, 1997, ISBN 1-57392-131-9.
- Encounters With the Paranormal: Science, Knowledge, and Belief, edited by Kendrick Frazier, 1998, Prometheus Books, ISBN 1-57392-203-X.
- People of Chaco: A Canyon and Its Culture, by Kendrick Frazier. Updated and Revised Edition, 2005, W.W. Norton, New York. ISBN 0-393-31825-7
- Science Under Siege: Defending Science, Exposing Pseudoscience, by Kendrick Frazier, 2009, Prometheus Books, ISBN 1-59102-715-2
- Shadows of Science: How to Uphold Science, Detect Pseudoscience, and Expose Antiscience in the Age of Disinformation, by Kendrick Frazier, 2024, Prometheus Books, ISBN 978-1-63388-938-5
