= Lady Ganga =

American paddleboarder for cervical-cancer awareness

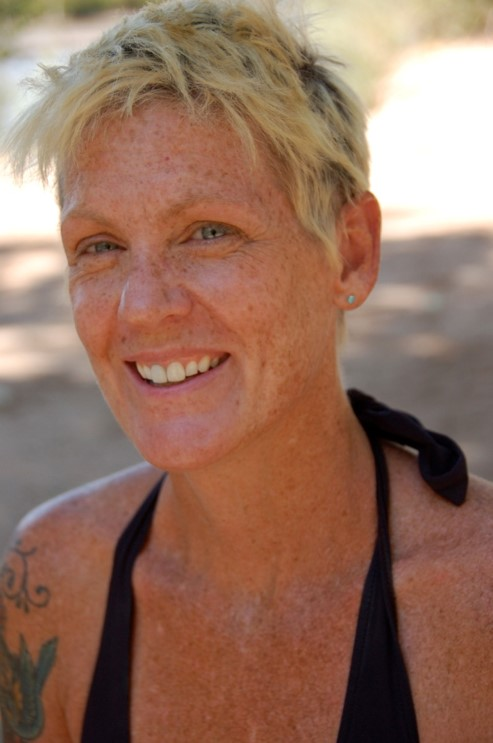
- Frazier in 2010
- Born: Michele Lenore Frazier; October 6, 1966; Alexandria, Virginia, U.S.
- Died: February 5, 2012 (aged 45); Albuquerque, New Mexico, U.S.
- Known for: Cervical-cancer awareness, woman's world record in standup paddleboarding down the Ganges
- Spouse: 2
- Children: 3
- Parents: Kendrick Frazier; Ruth Frazier
- Website: Official website

Michele Lenore Frazier Baldwin (October 6, 1966 – February 5, 2012), also known as Lady Ganga, was an American who set a world record in standup paddleboarding by paddling 700 miles (1,100 km) down the Ganges in India after being diagnosed with terminal cervical cancer in 2011. Her goal was to raise money and awareness for cervical cancer, human papillomavirus infection, and the HPV vaccine.

== Early life ==
Baldwin grew up in Virginia, along with her older brother Christopher, until the family moved to Albuquerque. According to her father, Kendrick Frazier, Baldwin always loved the water and gave up her pursuit of a college degree to become a kayak instructor and river guide on the Rio Grande.

When Baldwin was 19, she saved up enough money to travel to India by shining shoes at local Country Western bars. On her trip she discovered Buddhism.

== Cancer diagnosis ==
Baldwin was diagnosed with cervical cancer in 2009. She underwent chemotherapy, radiation and surgery. Baldwin had gone 10 years without a cervical screening test (pap smear), twice canceling, partially due to the expense, since she had no health insurance. She sought medical attention when she began bleeding.

Following a recurrence of the cancer for the third time, now stage 4, and a predicted life expectancy of three to six months, she traveled to California to visit a childhood friend, where she learned to standup paddleboard.

== Starry Ganga expedition ==
After learning to paddleboard, Baldwin decided to undertake an expedition on the Ganges River to bring attention to preventable cancer, despite being advised by friends and medical practitioners that being on her feet every day for a month was not a good idea. It took Baldwin six weeks to plan her trip. Uli, a company that makes inflatable paddleboards, made Baldwin a custom board that, when inflated, was 12.5 feet (3.8 m) long, weighed only 30 pounds (14 kg) and had extra D-rings to enable her to be towed if she became tired. Baldwin's friend and filmmaker, Nat Stone, documented her expedition, which started at Rishikesh and ended in the Hindu holy city of Varanasi. She decided to name her trip the Starry Ganga (Ganges) Expedition.

Her goal was to bring awareness to the 250,000 deaths per year worldwide from cervical cancer, of which 70,000 occur in India. Her hope was that through her story, women would not delay having regular pap tests, as she had done, and that parents would ensure their children receive the HPV vaccine. Baldwin teamed up with the Global Initiative Against HPV and Cervical Cancer (GIAHC), with the intent of raising money.

I intend to spend a lot of time meditating on the river. People die the way they live, and I want to die with grace.

— Michele Frazier Baldwin, Albuquerque Journal

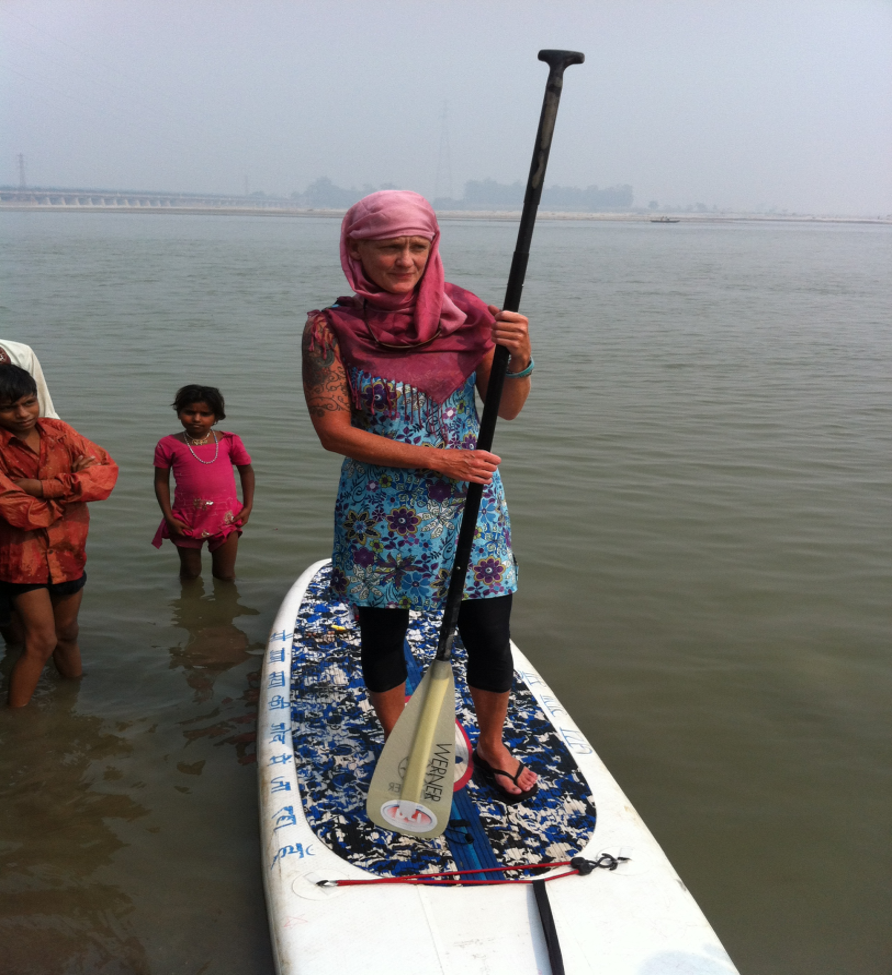
As newspapers wrote about Michele, children and townspeople came to see the woman on the paddleboard.

Her journey began on October 17, 2011, with Stone in a faster boat that carried his filming equipment and supplies. The duo met with a support van every three or four days. At one point Baldwin saw a floating body and called the police, who advised her that the poor, who cannot afford any type of funeral, often put the bodies of loved ones in the river. She stated that she found the paddleboarding soothing and helpful in easing her pain from the cancer. Baldwin spent ten to twelve hours per day standing, paddling, and performing Tibetan prayers for the dying.

Her twenty-five day, 700-mile (1,100 km) journey set a women's world record for paddleboarding. Her trek was documented on her website and by several newspapers, including the Albuquerque Journal and The Times of India. People nicknamed her Lady Ganga and would watch for her along the river. She gave local children rides on her paddleboard.

It became very clear to me that I'd been completely healed. That healing, though, is not incompatible with death.

— Michele Frazier Baldwin, Lady Ganga: Nilza's Story, Short Documentary

== Film ==
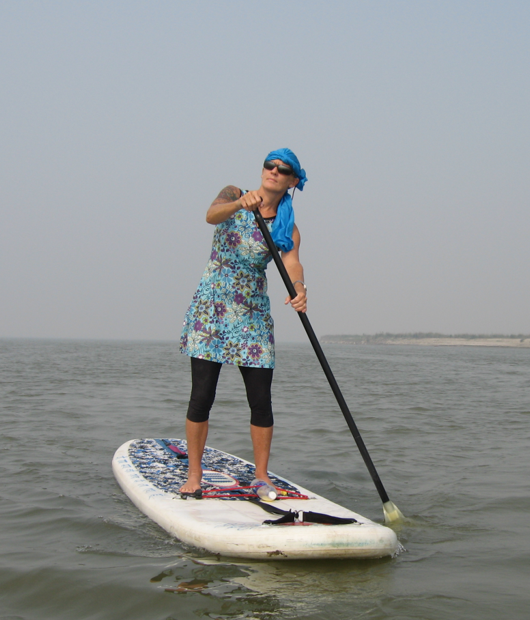
Baldwin paddling on the Ganges River

Baldwin was featured in two documentaries, Lady Ganga and Paddling the Ganges.

Filmmakers Mark Hefti and Fredric Lumiere approached Baldwin, shortly after her return from India, about being featured, along with other women, in the documentary film called Someone You Love: The HPV Epidemic which was released in 2014. After hearing Baldwin's story the team decided to dedicate a documentary exclusively to her. Lumiere found her story "exotic and epic" and "it was about even more than cervical cancer, it was about accepting your destiny, coming to peace with it, and doing something incredible with your life". Lumiere and Hefti started a successful Kickstarter campaign that raised triple the amount of money they needed, more than $150,000. This allowed them to translate the documentary into more than 50 languages.

The original intent of the film was to focus on Baldwin's story. When the team went to India to do more filming, they showed a six-minute version of the video called Lady Ganga to the residents of a mountain village in the region of Ladakh. After watching the film, which was dubbed in the native language, most of the women from the village took a chartered bus to a women's health clinic in a nearby village. At the clinic, a precancerous lesion was found and removed from the cervix of a woman named Nilza. It was at a stage where if left untreated, it would most likely have become cancerous and fatal. Hefti and Lumiere decided to add the story of Nilza to the documentary to illustrate how Baldwin's story continued to have an impact after her death.

The music for the film was written by cinema composer Lisbeth Scott.

The film Lady Ganga: Nilza's Story was released in London on November 4, 2015, three years after Baldwin's death. All profits were donated to the Michele Baldwin Memorial Fund, managed by the American Sexual Health Association. On February 4, 2016, the film was shown at the UN on World Cancer Day, an event that had the theme Towards a Cervical Cancer Free World. Baldwin's parents, Ruth and Ken Frazier, and her children attended. Baldwin's sixteen-year-old child spoke about the loss of her mother.

== Death ==
After returning from India, Baldwin's condition worsened. She was able to stay in her apartment with the help of three close friends. Ten weeks later, on February 5, 2012, Baldwin died at her home in Albuquerque at the age of 45. She was cremated on an open-air funeral pyre in a Buddhist ceremony in Colorado. Baldwin's mother described the ceremony as both sorrowful and joyful.

== Awards and legacy ==
In 2012 Baldwin was, posthumously, given the Top Expedition award from SUP (stand up paddle) magazine for her Ganges River paddle. Her mother, Ruth Frazier accepted the award on her behalf.

In 2016, the film Lady Ganga was awarded the Flickers' International Humanitarian Award at the Rhode Island International Film Festival.

In 2017, Bulova created a special-edition watch to pay tribute to Baldwin and to help raise money for and awareness of cervical cancer. Bulova partnered with the Global Film Fund and the American Cancer Society to launch the newly designed watch, with 10 percent of the sales being donated to the American Cancer Society.

The first Lady Ganga Trailblazer Award was presented in honor of Baldwin on October 5, 2018, at the 32nd International IPVS conference in Sydney, Australia. Award winners must have executed impactful campaigns to raise public awareness about HPV and HPV-related diseases, HPV vaccines, and cervical cancer screening. Contributions may be academic, artistic, social, cultural, economic, technical, or media related. The award was presented by Dr. Shobha S. Krishnan, Founder and President of the Global Initiative Against HPV and Cervical Cancer (GIAHC) and was shared by Drs. Silvia San Jose, President, IPVS and Joel Palefsky, Chair, HPV Working Group, IPVS for their demonstration of creativity in raising awareness about HPV and related diseases by launching the first International HPV Awareness day on March 4, 2018. In 2019, the award went to Miriam Cremer, a board-certified obstetrician and gynecologist and the president and founder of Basic Health International (BHI), a group that is focussed on eradicating cervical cancer around the world.

== Personal life ==
Baldwin was married twice, having two children with her first husband and one child with her second. She lived in Colorado with her second husband, then returned to Albuquerque in 2009, where she worked as a paramedic.

Baldwin was known for changing her hair color around her travel plans. When she went to Spain, France and Morocco, she colored her hair black and for her final trip to India she chose blonde.
