= Nancy Kozikowski =

American artist

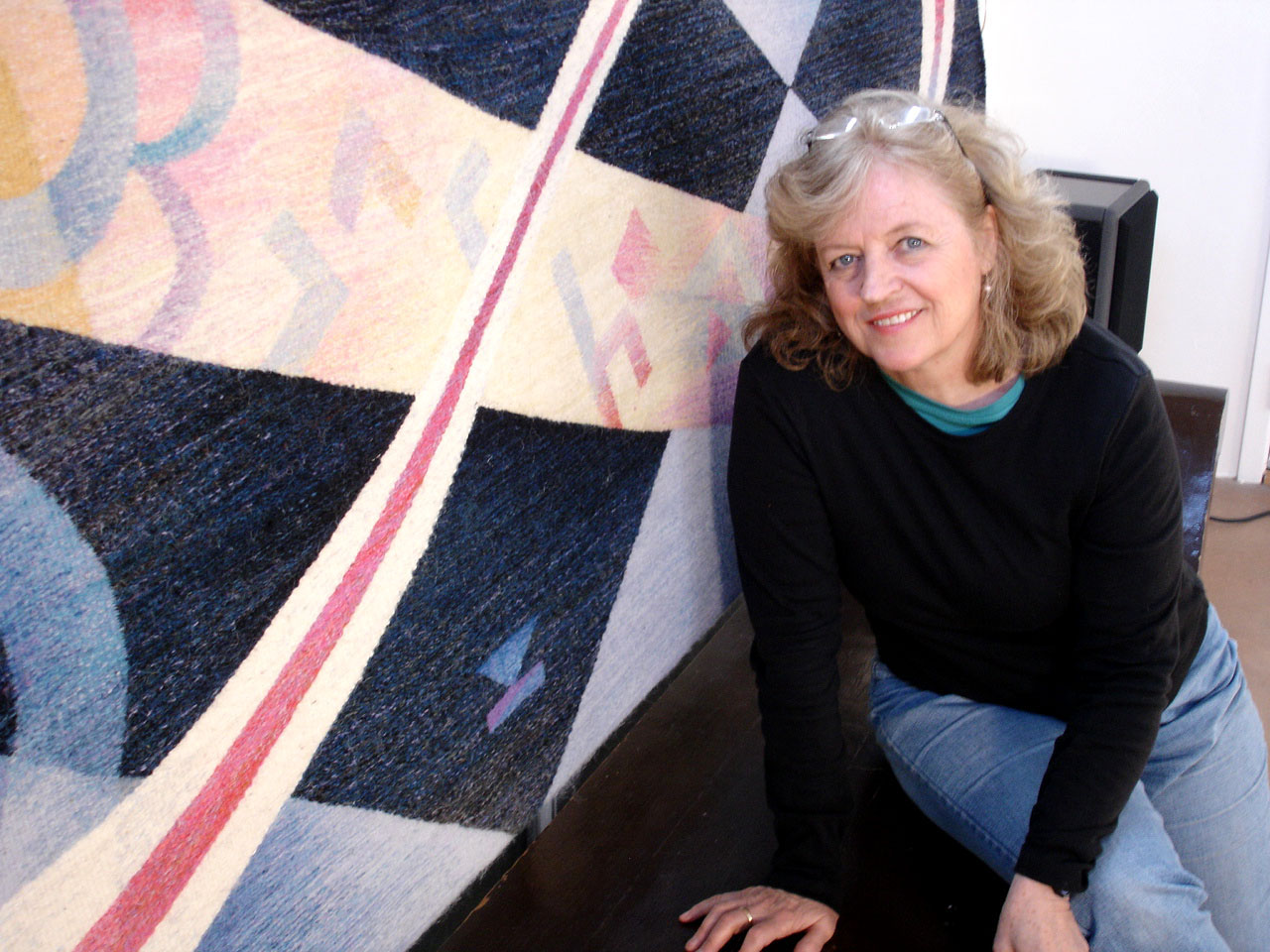
- Kozikowski at DSG Fine Art Gallery, Albuquerque, New Mexico
- Born: March 31, 1943 (age 83); Albuquerque, New Mexico, United States
- Known for: Tapestry, Painting

Nancy Kozikowski (born March 31, 1943) is a contemporary American artist specializing in tapestry and painting known for creating large woven art displayed in public places.

== Early life ==
As a child, Kozikowski always showed a penchant for art. An incident when she was 15 set the course of her life in a new direction. While at an Albuquerque bus stop Kozikowski met a Navajo woman who was spinning yarn and weaving in a nearby Indian trading post. Nancy convinced the woman to teach her to spin and was soon creating skeins of yarn. At the same time, she noticed a Navajo loom in the nearby Fred Harvey Museum at the Alvarado Hotel at the Albuquerque Train Station. Sketching the device in complete detail, she then built one herself. Her painting talents were now joined by a new passion: she had discovered weaving.

== Training ==
Nancy studied painting under the strict Austrian University of New Mexico professor John Tatschl who moved her to tears on more than one occasion, yet grounded her in the basics. Her talents continued to be recognized and encouraged, leading her, at 17, to announce her intentions to stage her first exhibition. Her teacher was appalled at such a plan. Nancy did it anyway; her first public, one man show took place in the Albuquerque High School Library.

== Marriage ==
Nancy Married a young writer, Holocaust refugee and son of the late Polish movie star Witold Conti. According to Janusz: "We worked for nearly a year weaving a complete exhibit before approaching a gallery. Then, rolling up the pieces into a grand bundle, we picked what we thought was the best gallery in Portland, walked in cold and asked for a one-man exhibition. The following year we got our show."

Nancy and her husband Janusz were invited by the Polish government to exhibit new works in Warsaw 1979. Janusz felt honored to return to the very place he had fled as a child. While in Poland, Nancy debuted her woven interpretation of the “Black Madonna,” amid concerns that the image might be censored from the show because of its religious content. Pope John Paul II was given the piece because of his personal devotion to the icon. The tapestry is now in the Vatican Collection.

Nancy and Janusz's artistic collaboration ended along with their marriage in early 1987. Janusz then focused on painting while Nancy followed her passion for tapestry. Late that year, Nancy met art dealer John Cacciatore and a new relationship followed. They became a couple and married ten years later.

== Recognition ==
In 1982, New Mexico Governor Bruce King announced that Nancy and Janusz had influenced the direction of weaving in northern New Mexico as well as nationally. They received the annual governors award for excellence and achievements in the arts.

The following year a reporter for The Today Show introduced them to a mass audience in a profile story about their work and lifestyle. Soon after that, the couple was featured in the National Geographic Society Book series.

== Public collections ==
- Mount Sinai Medical Center New York, New York
- UCLA Anderson School of Management Collins Building Los Angeles California
- American Society of Radiologic Technologists Albuquerque, New Mexico
- Grand Hyatt at Oriental Plaza Beijing China
- Albuquerque International Sunport (International Airport) Albuquerque New Mexico
- Sandia Casino Albuquerque New Mexico
- Block Distributing Company, San Antonio Texas

== Decorative pieces ==
=== Carpets ===
Currently residing in the small arts village of Songzhaung . Nancy often frequents the small established studios. She is inspired by the craftsmen whose skills have been passed down from generation to generation and in a variety of ancient processes and techniques. Nancy continues designing hand tufted carpets, hand knotted, Persian style carpets, large flat tapestries for walls and floors in public places.

=== Silk embroideries ===
Nancy's embroidery designs are created in Suzhou, China. Chinese embroidery artists developed the Su style of embroidery over 2000 years ago. The technique has been highly prized by the Imperial Court for its extraordinary detail and extensive range of subtle silk thread colors. During the Song dynasty (960–1270 AD) the Suzhou embroiderers began to collaborate with artists and calligraphers, and it became fashionable to translate their work into silk embroideries. Nancy is currently working with the master Su embroiderers to interpret her designs in silk.

== Liberty project ==
In 1986 Dave Nordstrand wrote: "Albuquerque artist Nancy Kozikowski wants to outfit the Statue of Liberty in a new garb. The well known weaver’s thoughts measure about 60 feet by 100 feet. That’s the size of the Indian chief blanket she’d like to drape around of the statue. It’s an idea sure to make Christo writhe with envy. 'It would be representative of all the tribes,' Kozikowski said. 'I think it’s time Native Americans were included in her (the statues) ideals.'"

== Trivia ==
In April 1956, an Albuquerque Tribune writer wrote: "They were sweet kisses, on the cheek, nothing over the top," she said. "Elvis was giving out autographs and the kisses were totally appropriate for the situation. Nancy Kozikowski can't remember where she was or what she was doing when Elvis Presley died. The Presley she knew was a young man, a rising star. The Presley she remembers, will always remember, kissed her outside the Albuquerque Armory late in the evening of April 12, 1956. "Singer's Kiss Leaves Girl, 13, Real Shook," read the front-page headline of April 13, 1956, in The Albuquerque Tribune. The girl in the headline was not Kozikowski but her childhood pal Carla Singer. Singer told The Tribune how Presley kissed her and her friend Nancy as he was leaving the Armory after a performance.
