= Thomas E. Horn =

American philanthropist (born 1946)

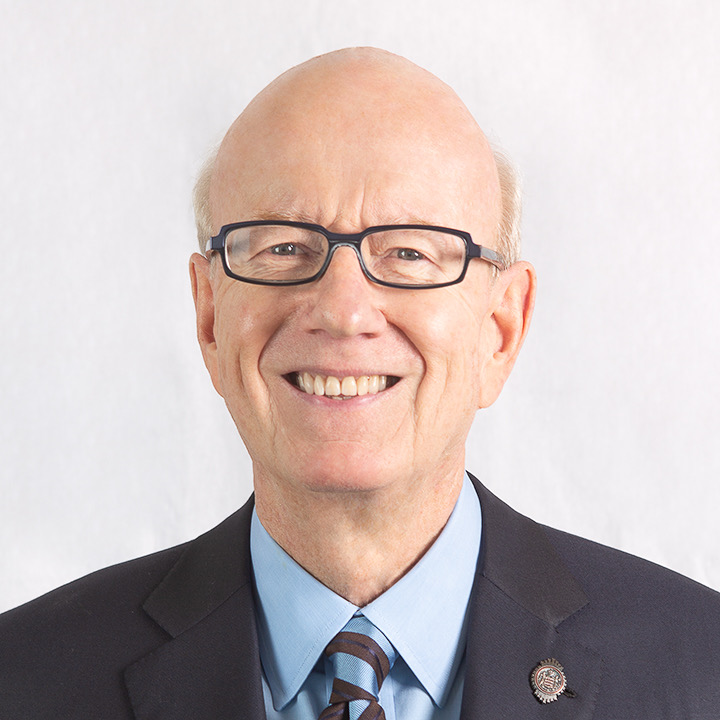
Thomas E. Horn

Thomas Eugene Horn (born June 7, 1946) is President of the San Francisco Performing Arts Center Foundation and Vice President and Past President of the San Francisco War Memorial and Performing Arts Center.

== Early life and education ==
Horn was born and raised in Albuquerque, New Mexico, the son of Lucille and H.B. Horn. His father co-founded the Horn Oil Co., a major oil and gas distributor. After serving in the New Mexico Air National Guard and graduating from UCLA School of Law, Horn served as legal director of the New Mexico Chapter of the American Civil Liberties Union. In 1976, Horn moved to San Francisco.

== Career ==
As a lawyer, Horn spent much of his practice in the 1970s representing gay clients. In his native New Mexico, he advocated for gay rights and sexual civil liberties as legal director of that state's ACLU. In that capacity, he challenged New Mexico's sodomy law. After moving to San Francisco in 1976, Horn would eventually go on to become active in local politics, working with the likes of slain gay Supervisor Harvey Milk, and was eventually one of the founders of Bay Area Lawyers for Individual Freedom (BALIF).

In 2009, Horn was named by Albert II, Prince of Monaco as Honorary Consul of Monaco in San Francisco.

Horn was publisher of the Bay Area Reporter from 2004 to 2013.

Horn is President of the Bob A. Ross Foundation, which supports a diverse range of HIV-related, LGBT, cultural, and other nonprofit organizations.

== Awards and recognition ==
The Republic of France has decorated Horn for his contributions to the Franco-American relationship, including his services as chair of the San Francisco-Paris Sister City Committee: Legion of Honor in 2021, Chevalier de l'Ordre National de la Légion d'Honneur in 2020, the Chevalier de l’Ordre National du Mérite in 2003 with a promotion to the rank of Commandeur in 2011, and the Chevalier de l’Ordre des Arts et des Lettres in 1994. Horn was also awarded the Order of Grimaldi by the Principality of Monaco in 2025.

In 2022, Horn received the Nancy Pelosi Lifetime Achievement Award from the Shanti Project.

In 2022, Horn was appointed the Chair of the San Francisco Host Committee, the non-profit arm of the Mayor's Office of Protocol, responsible for organizing and funding the local consular corps as well as the many heads of state and foreign dignitaries that visit San Francisco annually.

In 2024, Horn was awarded the California Icon Award by the Commonwealth Club of California.

== Personal life ==
In 2018, Horn married his partner of 35 years, Caesar Alexzander, in a ceremony officiated by then-Lieutenant Governor of California Gavin Newsom.
