= List of people from New Mexico =

State flag of New Mexico

Location of New Mexico in the United States

This is a list of people from New Mexico, which includes notable people who were either born or have lived for a significant period of time in the U.S. state of New Mexico or its predecessors, the Spanish and Mexican Nuevo México and the American New Mexico Territory. They are referred to by the demonym "New Mexican", and by the Spanish language demonym "Neomexicano" or "Neomejicano" (as well as the feminine "Neomexicana" or "Neomejicana").

== Athletics ==
- Kyle Altman (born 1986) – soccer player
- Jason Anderson (born 1993) – born in Rio Rancho, New Mexico, Supercross racer
- Ross Anderson (born 1971) – lives in Taos, record holder in speed skiing
- Hank Baskett (born 1982) – born in Clovis, former NFL player
- Notah Begay III (born 1972) – born in Albuquerque, golfer
- Ray Birmingham (born 1955) – born in Hobbs, baseball coach
- Alan Branch (born 1984) – born in Rio Rancho, NFL player
- Alex Bregman (born 1994) – baseball player
- Bill Bridges (1939–2015) – born in Hobbs, former NBA player
- Brenda Burnside (born 1963) – born in Albuquerque, boxer
- Shelia Burrell (born 1972) – born in Albuquerque, heptathlete; fourth place in 2004 Olympic Games
- Bryce Cabeldue – current NFL player for the Seattle Seahawks, from Clovis
- Edgar Castillo (born 1986) – born in Las Cruces, Liga MX
- Jackie Chavez (born 1983) – born in Albuquerque, lives in Las Cruces, boxer
- Carlos Condit (born 1984) – born in Albuquerque, UFC fighter
- Ryan Cook (born 1983) – born in Albuquerque, NFL player
- Christian Cunningham (born 1997) – raised in Albuquerque, basketball player in the Israeli Basketball Premier League
- John Dodson (born 1984) – born in Albuquerque, mixed martial artist
- Michael Dunn (born 1985) – born in Farmington, MLB player
- Doug Eddings (born 1968) – born in Las Cruces, MLB umpire
- Arian Foster (born 1986) – born in Albuquerque, running back for the Miami Dolphins
- Bob Foster (1938–2015) – born in Albuquerque, light-heavyweight boxing world champion
- Jack Gardner (1910–2000) – college men's basketball coach
- Mitch Garver (born 1991) – born in Albuquerque, baseball player
- Frank "Bruiser Brody" Goodish (1946–1988) – professional wrestler
- Aaron Graham (born 1973) – former NFL center
- Fred Haney (1896–1977) – Major League Baseball manager
- Pat Henry (born 1951) – collegiate track-and-field head coach
- Holly Holm (born 1981) – born in Albuquerque, mixed martial artist
- Damion James (born 1987) – born in Hobbs, player for the New Jersey Nets
- Ralph Kiner (1922–2014) – Baseball Hall of Famer
- Nancy Lopez (born 1957) – raised in Roswell, Hall of Fame golfer
- Ronnie Lott (born 1959) – Pro Football Hall of Famer
- Colt McCoy (born 1986) – born in Hobbs, quarterback for the Washington Redskins
- Tommy McDonald (1934–2018) – Pro Football Hall of Fame wide receiver
- Matt Moore (born 1989) – lived in Edgewood, MLB player
- Steve Ontiveros (born 1961) – baseball player
- Dorothy Page (1921–1989) – known as the "mother of the Iditarod Trail Sled Dog Race"
- André Roberson (born 1991) – born in Las Cruces, professional basketball player
- Trevor Rogers (born 1998) – born in Carlsbad, MLB player
- Cody Ross (born 1980) – born in Carlsbad, MLB player
- Diego Sanchez (born 1981) – born in Albuquerque, UFC fighter
- Mike E. Smith (born 1965) – born in Roswell, Hall of Fame jockey
- Tony Snell (born 1991) – professional basketball player
- Vern Stephens (1920–1968) – born in McAlister, baseball player
- Chuck Stevens (1918–2018) – born in Colfax County, baseball player
- Blake Swihart (born 1992) – raised in Rio Rancho, MLB player
- Johnny Tapia (1967–2012) – born in Albuquerque, boxer
- Jeff Taylor (1960–2020) – raised in Hobbs, former NBA player
- Jeffery Taylor (born 1989) – raised in Hobbs, player for the Charlotte Hornets
- Al Unser (born 1939) – born in Albuquerque, race car driver
- Al Unser Jr. (born 1962) – born in Albuquerque, race car driver
- Bobby Unser (1934–2021) – lived in Albuquerque, race car driver
- Brian Urlacher (born 1978) – grew up in Lovington, NFL player
- Duane Ward (born 1964) – born in Los Ojos (formerly Park View); grew up in Farmington, MLB player
- Kathy Whitworth (born 1939) – lived in Jal, New Mexico, where her family owned a hardware store; professional golfer

== Architecture ==
- John Gaw Meem (1894–1983) – architect known for his work reviving traditional New Mexican architecture
- Antoine Predock (1936–2024) – architect of Petco Park, Tacoma Art Museum
- Mike Reynolds – architect, designer of Earthships

== Art, literature, and journalism ==
- Edward Abbey – novelist, graduated from the University of New Mexico
- Rudolfo Anaya – novelist
- Richard Artschwager – painter, illustrator and sculptor
- Jimmy Santiago Baca – poet and author
- Oscar E. Berninghaus (1874–1952) – founding member of Taos Society of Artists
- Ernest L. Blumenschein (1874–1960) – founding member of Taos Society of Artists
- Fray Angelico Chavez – poet and painter
- Linda Chavez (born 1947) – author, commentator, radio talk show host
- Mark Coggins (born 1957) – author and photographer
- E. Irving Couse (1866–1936) – founding member of Taos Society of Artists
- Stanley Crawford (born 1937) – writer and farmer
- William deBuys (born 1949) – writer and conservationist
- W. Herbert Dunton (1878–1936) – founding member of Taos Society of Artists
- Malcolm Ebright (1932–2005) – land grant historian, advocate, and attorney
- Nicolai Fechin (1881–1955) – painter known for his portraits and works featuring Native Americans
- Forrest Fenn – poet, scholar, artist and painter, author, historian, teacher, environmentalist
- R. C. Gorman (1931–2005) – Navajo artist
- Tony Hillerman (1925–2008) – journalist, mystery writer, "Edgar" award winner, MWA Grand Master
- Peter Hurd (1904–1984) – artist
- Barbara Latham (1896–1989) – painter, printmaker, illustrator
- D. H. Lawrence (1885–1930) – novelist, poet, playwright, essayist, literary critic and painter
- Marjorie Herrera Lewis – author and journalist
- Albert Looking Elk (1888–1940) – Taos Pueblo painter
- Mabel Dodge Luhan (1879–1962) – writer and patroness of Taos art colony
- Albert Lujan (1892–1948) – Taos Pueblo painter
- Charles Fletcher Lummis (1859–1928) – journalist and Indian activist, photographer
- Agnes Martin (1912–2004) – abstract painter
- George R. R. Martin (born 1948) – lives in Santa Fe, screenwriter and author of fantasy, horror, and science fiction, including Game of Thrones
- Maria Martinez (1887–1980) – pottery artist, famous for her pioneering work in black on black pottery
- Bill Mauldin (1921–2003) – editorial cartoonist, Pulitzer Prize, 1945 and 1958
- Cormac McCarthy – author of No Country for Old Men, The Road, Pulitzer Prize winner
- Michael McGarrity – novelist, former deputy sheriff of Santa Fe County
- Juan Mirabal (1903–1970) – Taos Pueblo painter
- N. Scott Momaday (1934) – Kiowa, Pulitzer Prize-winning author and visual artist
- Agnes Morley Cleaveland (1874–1958) – writer, cattle rancher, women's basketball player
- Howard Morgan – television weather forecaster
- Dan Namingha – Hopi artist
- Bruce Nauman – artist
- Georgia O'Keeffe (1887–1986) – artist
- Bert Geer Phillips (1868–1956) – founding member of Taos Society of Artists
- Ernie Pyle (1900–1945) – war correspondent, Pulitzer Prize 1944
- Joseph Rael (born 1935) – Native American ceremonial dancer, shaman, writer, and artist
- Anita Rodriguez (born 1941) – artist and painter
- Antonio Roybal – artist
- Hib Sabin (born 1935) – sculptor
- George I. Sánchez (1906–1972) – scholar and activist
- Joseph Henry Sharp (1859–1953) – founding member of Taos Society of Artists
- Lori "Pop Wea" Tanner (died 1966) – Taos Pueblo painter and potter
- Anne Trujillo – television news anchor and reporter, KMGH (ABC) in Denver
- Sabine Ulibarri (1919–2003) – poet and teacher
- Alisa Valdes – New York Times and USA Today bestselling author, staff writer Boston Globe and Los Angeles Times, screenwriter and producer
- Harold Joe Waldrum (1934–2003) – artist
- Linda Wertheimer – Senior National Correspondent for NPR
- Cody Willard – anchor for Fox Business Network and co-host of Fox Business Happy Hour
- Jack Williamson – novelist, professor at Eastern New Mexico University

== Business ==
- Paul Allen (1953–2018) – founded Microsoft in Albuquerque
- Jeff Bezos (born 1964) – founder of Amazon
- Mack C. Chase (1931–2023) – oil and natural gas businessman, also the richest New Mexican
- Bill Gates (born 1955) – founded Microsoft in Albuquerque
- Maria Gertrudis "Tules" Barceló (c. 1800–1852) – entrepreneur and gambler
- Conrad Hilton (1887–1979) – founder of Hilton Worldwide
- Forrest Mims (born 1944) – founded Micro Instrumentation and Telemetry Systems in Albuquerque
- Ed Roberts (1941–2010) – founded Micro Instrumentation and Telemetry Systems in Albuquerque

== Crime ==
- Billy the Kid (1859–1881) – outlaw
- Jose Chavez y Chavez (1851–1924) – cowboy and outlaw
- Francisco Martin Duran – attempted assassin of Bill Clinton
- William Walters (aka William E. "Bronco Bill" Walters) (1869–1921) – outlaw

== Film and theater ==
- Ari Aster (born 1986) – director, writer, Hereditary, Midsommer
- Aviva – actress, Superbad
- Kathy Baker (born 1950) – actress, CBS's Picket Fences, Fox's Boston Public
- Greg Baldwin (born 1960) – actor, Uncle Iroh on the Nickelodeon animated series Avatar: The Last Airbender
- Bruce Cabot (1904–1972) – actor, King Kong, Dodge City, The War Wagon
- Paul Chavez (born 1984) – Oscar-winning visual effects artist, Blade Runner 2049
- Jan Clayton (1917–1983) – actress, star of films and TV series Lassie
- Ronny Cox (born 1938) – actor, Deliverance, RoboCop
- Jesse Tyler Ferguson (born 1975) – actor, ABC's Modern Family
- Tony Genaro, actor – Anger Management, Phenomenon
- Annabeth Gish (born 1971) – actress, Fox's The X-Files and Showtime's Brotherhood
- Drew Goddard (born 1975) – screenwriter, producer
- Jeremy Foley (born 1983) – actor, Nickelodeon's Caitlin's Way
- Adrian Grenier (born 1976) – actor, HBO's Entourage
- Anna Gunn (born 1968) – actress, HBO's Deadwood, AMC's Breaking Bad
- William Hanna (1910–2001) – animator, director, producer, cartoon artist, and co-founder of Hanna-Barbera
- Neil Patrick Harris (born 1973) – actor, How I Met Your Mother, Doogie Howser, M.D.
- Alexa Havins (born 1980) – actress, BBC's Torchwood, ABC's All My Children and One Life to Live
- Judy Herrera – actress
- Dennis Hopper (1936–2010) – actor, filmmaker, photographer, and artist
- Mike Judge (born 1962) – actor, animator, producer, and creator of King of the Hill and Beavis and Butt-Head
- Minka Kelly (born 1980) – actress, Lee Daniels' The Butler, The Roommate
- Val Kilmer (1959–2025) – actor, Heat, Tombstone, Top Gun
- Mae Marsh (1894–1968) – actress, Intolerance, Rebecca of Sunnybrook Farm
- Benito Martinez (born 1971) – actor, FX's The Shield
- Patrice Martinez (1963–2018) – actress, The Family Channel's Zorro
- Demi Moore (born 1962) – actress, Ghost, Indecent Proposal, A Few Good Men
- Freddie Prinze Jr. (born 1975) – actor, I Know What You Did Last Summer, She's All That
- Steven Michael Quezada (born 1963) – actor, Breaking Bad
- Tracy Reiner (born 1964) – actress, When Harry Met Sally..., A League of Their Own, Apollo 13
- Jay Roach (born 1957) – director, producer, the Austin Powers films, Meet the Parents
- Willow Shields (born 2000) – child actress, Hunger Games
- Ron Shock (1942–2012) – comedian
- Geno Silva (1948–2020) – actor, Scarface, The Lost World: Jurassic Park, Amistad
- Madolyn Smith (born 1957) – actress, Urban Cowboy, Funny Farm
- Austin St. John (born 1975) – actor, Jason Lee Scott, the original Red Ranger, on Mighty Morphin Power Rangers
- Kim Stanley (1925–2001) – actress, The Goddess, To Kill a Mockingbird
- French Stewart (born 1964) – actor, 3rd Rock from the Sun
- Slim Summerville (1894–1968) – actor
- Heidi Swedberg (born 1966) – actress, Seinfeld
- Raoul Trujillo (born 1955) – actor
- Jeremy Ray Valdez (born 1980) – actor
- Kristen Vigard (born 1963) – actress, Annie, Guiding Light, The Survivors
- Nick Wechsler (born 1978) – actor, The WB's and UPN's Roswell

== Fashion ==
- Judith Baldwin – Miss New Mexico 1965, runner-up Miss USA 1965, actress
- Tom Ford – grew up in Santa Fe, fashion designer and businessman
- Arizona Muse – fashion model
- Millicent Rogers (1902–1953) – socialite, fashion icon, and art collector
- Mai Shanley – Miss USA 1984

== Government ==
- Toney Anaya (born 1941) – former governor
- Jerry Apodaca (born 1934) – former governor
- Clinton Presba Anderson (1895–1975) – former U.S. senator
- Jeff Bingaman (born 1943) – former U.S. senator
- Tomás Vélez Cachupín – 47th and 52nd Spanish governor of New Mexico, judge, achieved peace between Spaniards and the Amerindian peoples of New Mexico
- Dennis Chavez (1888–1962) – former U.S. senator
- Cochise (1812–1874) – Chiricahua Apache chief
- Colorow (1810–1888) – Ute chief
- Bronson M. Cutting (1888–1935) – U.S. senator
- Pete Domenici (1932–2017) – U.S. senator
- Ed Foreman (born 1933) – U.S. representative
- Geronimo (1829–1909) – Chiricahua Apache chief
- Thomas E. Horn (born 1946) – Trustee San Francisco War Memorial and Performing Arts Center, lawyer, publisher Bay Area Reporter
- Dolores Huerta – civil rights activist
- Gary Johnson (born 1953) – governor of New Mexico; Libertarian presidential candidate in 2012 and 2016
- Bruce King (1924–2009) – governor of New Mexico
- Timothy Kraft (born 1941) – campaign manager for U.S. President Jimmy Carter in 1980
- Manuel Lujan (1928–2019) – former U.S. representative
- Joseph Montoya (1915–1978) – U.S. senator
- Janet Napolitano (born 1957) – governor of Arizona, former United States Secretary of Homeland Security, current president of University of California System
- Steve Pearce (born 1947) – U.S. representative
- Popé (ca. 1630 – ca. 1688), also spelled Po'pay – leader of the Pueblo Revolt
- L. Bradford Prince (1840–1922) – governor of New Mexico Territory
- Bill Redmond (born 1954) – U.S. representative
- Bill Richardson (born 1947) – Energy secretary, ambassador to the United Nations, former governor, first Hispanic candidate for the U.S. presidency
- Edward R. Roybal (1916–2005) – U.S. representative from California, member of the Los Angeles City Council
- Joe Skeen (1927–2003) – former U.S. representative
- Tina Smith (born 1958) – U.S. senator
- Reies Tijerina (1926–2015) – Land grant activist, founder and leader of Alianza Federal de Mercedes
- Victorio (1825–1880) – Chiricahua Apache chief

== Military ==
- Carl Nelson Gorman (1907–1998) – U.S. Marine Corp soldier, Navajo code talker during World War II, artist, professor
- Pete Jimenez (1917–2006) – U.S. Army soldier in World War II

== Music ==
- Lorenzo Antonio (born 1969) – born in Albuquerque, Latin pop and Mexican pop singer
- Antonia Apodaca (1923–2020) – born in Rociada, New Mexico and American folk music singer
- Consuelo Luz Arostegui – lives in Angel Fire, Latino musician
- Ryan Bingham (born 1981) – born in Hobbs, singer-songwriter
- Zach Condon (born 1986) – born in Santa Fe, musician in Beirut
- John Denver (1943–1997) – born in Roswell, singer-songwriter
- Bradley Ellingboe (born 1958) – composer
- Al Hurricane (1936–2017) – born in Dixon, singer-songwriter, dubbed "The Godfather" of New Mexico music
- Al Hurricane Jr. (born 1959) – born in Albuquerque, singer-songwriter, dubbed the "godson" of New Mexico music
- John Lewis (1920–2001) – raised in Albuquerque, Albuquerque High School and University of New Mexico graduate; pianist and musical director of the Modern Jazz Quartet
- Demi Lovato (born 1992) – born in Albuquerque, pop music singer-songwriter
- James Mercer (born 1970) – singer, musician and leader of the Shins and Broken Bells
- Robert Mirabal (born 1966) – Taos Pueblo musician
- Jim Morrison (1943–1971) – lived in Albuquerque for several years during his childhood
- Michael Martin Murphey (born 1945) – author of New Mexico's state ballad, "The Land of Enchantment"
- Norman Petty (1927–1984) – musician, songwriter, record producer
- Pascual Romero (born 1980) – musician, television producer
- Sparx members – born in Albuquerque, Latin pop sisters Verónica, Rosamaria, Kristyna and Carolina Sanchez
- James Tenney (1934–2006) – born in Silver City, composer
- Kristen Vigard (born 1963) – lives in Taos, singer (Red Hot Chili Peppers, Fishbone)
- Tony Vincent (born 1973) – born in Albuquerque, performer
- Randy Castillo (born 1950–2002) – born in Albuquerque, Drummer (Ozzy Osbourne, Lita Ford)

== Law enforcement ==
- Elfego Baca (1865–1945) – gunman and lawman in the American frontier
- Pat Garrett (1850–1908) – sheriff known for shooting Billy the Kid
- Lonnie Zamora (1933–2009) – police officer who reported a famous UFO sighting outside Socorro in 1964

== Religion ==
- Cormac Antram (1926–2013) – Catholic priest, known for his work translating the Catholic mass into the Navajo language, last Franciscan priest who could speak Navajo fluently
- Anton Docher (1852–1928) – missionary and defender of the Indians
- Jeff King – Navajo hataałii (medicine man)

== Science and technology ==
- Adolph Francis Alphonse Bandelier (1840–1914) – archaeologist after whom Bandelier National Monument and Bandelier Elementary School (in Albuquerque) in New Mexico is named
- Edward Condon (1902–1974) – nuclear physicist
- Robert H. Goddard (1882–1945) – built the world's first liquid-fueled rocket
- Nicolle Gonzales (born 1980) – Navajo certified midwife and founder of the Changing Woman Initiative
- Sidney M. Gutierrez (born 1951) – astronaut
- Jaron Lanier (born 1960) – computer scientist
- Edgar Mitchell (1930–2016) – aeronautical engineer, NASA astronaut (walked on the Moon during Apollo 14)
- William Nordhaus (1941–2026) – economist, winner of the 2018 Nobel Memorial Prize in Economic Sciences
- J. Robert Oppenheimer (1904–1967) – theoretical physicist; the Manhattan Project, Los Alamos
- Harrison Schmitt (born 1935) – astronaut (walked on the Moon during Apollo 17), geologist and former U.S. senator from New Mexico
- Mark Spencer – computer engineer
- John Stapp – pioneer in studying the effects of acceleration and deceleration forces on humans, "the fastest man on earth"
- Clyde Tombaugh – astronomer and discoverer of the celestial body Pluto (at the time considered to be the 9th planet in the Solar System)
- Lydia Villa-Komaroff – molecular and cellular biologist
- Michael Wartell – chancellor of Indiana University – Purdue University Fort Wayne
- Annie Dodge Wauneka (1895–1997) – Navajo health educator, winner of Presidential Medal of Freedom

== See also ==
- List of New Mexico State University people
- List of people from Albuquerque
- List of New Mexico suffragists
- List of St. John's College (Annapolis/Santa Fe) people
- List of University of New Mexico alumni
- List of University of New Mexico faculty
- List of University of New Mexico presidents
- Lists of Americans
