= Madrecita, Te Debo Tanto =

1980 studio album by Al Hurricane and others

Studio album by Al Hurricane, Al Hurricane Jr., Baby Gaby, Gloria Pohl, Lorenzo Antonio, & Tiny Morrie
- Released: (United States) 1980
- Genre: New Mexico music
- Label: Hurricane Records

Al Hurricane, Al Hurricane Jr., Baby Gaby, Gloria Pohl, Lorenzo Antonio, & Tiny Morrie chronology
Cantan Corridos; Al Hurricane Jr. (1979)	Madrecita, Te Debo Tanto (1980)	15 Exitos Rancheros; Tiny Morrie, Al Hurricane Jr, & Al Hurricane Jr. (1979)

Al Hurricane chronology
La Prision de Santa Fe (1980)	Madrecita, Te Debo Tanto (1980)	Exitos De Al Hurricane (1980)

Madrecita, Te Debo Tanto is the first collaborative album by Al Hurricane, Al Hurricane Jr., Baby Gaby, Gloria Pohl, Lorenzo Antonio, & Tiny Morrie. It is the tenth full-length album released by the New Mexican musician Al Hurricane in 1980.

Johnny Tapia would often shout the words "Madrecita, Te Debo Tanto" if he won by knock out. He attributed this to El Godfather of New Mexico, Al Hurricane.

== Track listing ==
No.	Title	artist	Length
1.	"Madrecita, Te Debo Tanto"	Tiny Morrie
2.	"Madre Abandonada"	Al Hurricane
3.	"Madrecita De Mi Vida"	Al Hurricane Jr.
4.	"Mision Cumplida"	Gloria Pohl
5.	"Bendito Soy En Tenerte Madrecita"	Baby Gaby
6.	"Murio Mi Padre"	Al Hurricane
7.	"Doce Rosas (Para Mi Padre)"	Tiny Morrie
8.	"Un Dia A La Vez"	Lorenzo Antonio
9.	"Llore A Mi Madre"	Al Hurricane Jr.
10.	"Dos Coronas A Mi Madre"	Gloria Pohl
11.	"Padrecito, Padrecito"	Baby Gaby
