= 15 Exitos Rancheros, Vol. 2 =

Compilation album by Al Hurricane, Al Hurricane Jr., & Tiny Morrie
- Released: (United States) 1994
- Genre: New Mexico music
- Label: Hurricane Records

Al Hurricane, Al Hurricane Jr., & Tiny Morrie chronology
| 15 Exitos Rancheros (1986) | 15 Exitos Rancheros, Vol. 2 (1994) | A Tribute To Al Hurricane - Live, Vol. 1 (2008) |

Al Hurricane chronology
| The Return of Al Hurricane "EL" Godfather (1980) | 15 Exitos Rancheros Vol. 2 (1994) | Sigue... "La Leyenda"!!! (1994) |

15 Exitos Rancheros, Vol. 2 is the second compilation album by Al Hurricane, Al Hurricane Jr., & Tiny Morrie. It is the fifteenth album released by the New Mexican musician Al Hurricane in 1994.

== Track listing ==
| No. | Title | artist | Length |
|---|---|---|---|
| 1. | "Mi Saxophone" | Al Hurricane | 2:18 |
| 2. | "Sangre De Indio" | Tiny Morrie | 2:51 |
| 3. | "Que Te Parece" | Al Hurricane Jr. | 2:17 |
| 4. | "El Pescador Nadador" | Tiny Morrie | 3:23 |
| 5. | "Mi Prieta Linda" | Al Hurricane Jr. | 2:24 |
| 6. | "La Suegra y El Yerno" | Al Hurricane | 3:01 |
| 7. | "Ojitos Verdes" | Tiny Morrie | 2:52 |
| 8. | "Copa Tras Copa" | Al Hurricane Jr. | 2:15 |
| 9. | "Lu Mula Bronca" | Al Hurricane | 3:06 |
| 10. | "Flor Del Rio" | Tiny Morrie | 3:20 |
| 11. | "Una Estrellita Lloro" | Al Hurricane Jr. | 2:59 |
| 12. | "Eres Casado" | Al Hurricane | 2:48 |
| 13. | "El Sauce y La Palma" | Tiny Morrie | 3:17 |
| 14. | "Flor De Maria" | Al Hurricane Jr. | 2:46 |
| 15. | "Dos Hojas Sin Rumbo" | Al Hurricane | 2:54 |
