= Arostegui =

Arostegui or Aróstegui is a surname. Notable people with the surname include:

- Alfonso Clemente de Aróstegui (1698–1774), Spanish bishop, writer, lawyer and diplomat
- Consuelo Luz Arostegui, American singer
- Gonzalo de Quesada y Aróstegui (1868–1915), Cuban diplomat
- Juan Arostegui (born 1980), Argentine soccer player
- Manuel de Aróstegui Sáenz de Olamendi (1758–1813), Spanish politician
- María de las Mercedes Adam de Aróstegui (1873–1957), Cuban pianist and composer
- Xabier López-Arostegui (born 1997), Spanish basketball player
