= 15 Exitos Rancheros =

Compilation album by Al Hurricane, Al Hurricane Jr., & Tiny Morrie
- Released: (United States) 1986
- Genre: New Mexico music
- Label: Hurricane Records

Al Hurricane, Al Hurricane Jr., & Tiny Morrie chronology
Madrecita, Te Debo Tanto (1974)	15 Exitos Rancheros (1986)	15 Exitos Rancheros, Vol. 2 (1994)

Al Hurricane chronology
Bandido (supergroup) albums (198?)	15 Exitos Rancheros (1986)	The Return of Al Hurricane "EL" Godfather (198?)

15 Exitos Rancheros is a compilation album by Al Hurricane, Al Hurricane Jr., & Tiny Morrie. It is the thirteenth full-length album released by the New Mexican musician Al Hurricane in 1980.

== Track listing ==
No.	Title	artist	Length
1.	"Flor De Las Flores"	Al Hurricane Jr.	2:52
2.	"El Asesino"	Tiny Morrie	2:53
3.	"Frente Al Altar"	Al Hurricane	3:06
4.	"La Del Moño Colorado"	Tiny Morrie	3:18
5.	"El Gallo Celoso"	Al Hurricane Jr.	3:07
6.	"Rumbo Al Sur"	Al Hurricane	2:47
7.	"A Medias De La Noche"	Tiny Morrie	3:16
8.	"Vestido Mojado"	Al Hurricane	3:12
9.	"El Pintor"	Al Hurricane Jr.	2:47
10.	"El Chubasco"	Tiny Morrie	2:32
11.	"Por Una Mujer Casada"	Al Hurricane	2:53
12.	"Ojitos Soñadores"	Al Hurricane Jr.	2:44
13.	"El Lirio"	Tiny Morrie	2:34
14.	"Puño De Tierra"	Al Hurricane	2:47
15.	"Los Ojos De Pancha"	Al Hurricane Jr.	2:08
