= The Return of Al Hurricane "EL" Godfather =

Exitos De Al Hurricane

Studio album by Al Hurricane
- Released: (United States) 1980?
- Genre: New Mexico music
- Label: Hurricane Records

Al Hurricane chronology
15 Exitos Rancheros (1986)	Exitos De Al Hurricane (1980)	15 Exitos Rancheros Vol. 2 (1994)

The Return of Al Hurricane "EL" Godfather is the fourteenth album released by the New Mexican musician Al Hurricane in 1980?. Tracks from this album often appear on the NPR radio station KRWG's bilingual Latin music program Fiesta.

== Track listing ==
No.	Title	Length
1.	"Corazoncito Tirano"
2.	"Quiero Que Sepas"
3.	"La Viuda"
4.	"Fallaste Corazon"
5.	"Los Laureles"
6.	"Entre Besos"
7.	"Tepito Señorial"
8.	"Cariño Nuevo"
9.	"Carmelita"
10.	"La Suegra"
