= Para Las Madrecitas =

Studio album by Al Hurricane and Tiny Morrie
- Released: (United States) 1974
- Genre: Latin music, New Mexico music, Ranchera
- Length: 31:41
- Label: Hurricane Records

Al Hurricane and Tiny Morrie chronology
Para Las Madrecitas (1974)	Cantan Corridos (1979)

Al Hurricane chronology
Instrumentales con Al Hurricane (1967)	Para Las Madrecitas (1974)	Vestido Mojado (1974)

Para Las Madrecitas is the first collaborative album released in 1974 by Al Hurricane and Tiny Morrie, it is written to their mother Bennie Sanchez. The album is not the first time Al and Morrie recorded a together, they used to record together as "Al Hurricane & the Night Rockers". It is the sixth full-length album released by Al Hurricane.

== Track listing ==
All tracks are written by Al Hurricane & Tiny Morrie

No.	Title	Length
1.	"Mi Madrecita"	3:31
2.	"Madre Querida"	2:24
3.	"El Rosario De Mi Madre"	1:57
4.	"Buscando a Mi Madre"	2:23
5.	"Por El Amor a Mi Madre"	2:47
6.	"No Sufras Madre"	2:49
7.	"Adios Madre Querida"	2:12
8.	"El Huerfano"	3:06
9.	"Consejos De Una Madre"	2:38
10.	"Ni Por Mil Puñados De Oro"	2:20
11.	"Las Cuatro Velas"	3:01
12.	"Con La Tinta De Mi Sangre"	2:36
