= Cantan Corridos =

Studio album by Al Hurricane
- Released: 1979
- Genre: New Mexico music
- Label: Hurricane Records

Al Hurricane chronology
Vestido Mojado	Cantan Corridos (1979)	La Prision de Santa Fe (1980)

Cantan Corridos is the first collaborative album released in 1979 by the New Mexican musicians Al Hurricane and Al Hurricane Jr. The album is not the first time Al and his son performed together, they had appeared together on the Val De La O Show. It is the eighth full-length album released by Al Hurricane.

== Track listing ==
No.	Title	Length
1.	"El Dia De San Juan"
2.	"El Ranchero Afamado"
3.	"Juan Charrasqueado"
4.	"Felipe Angeles"
5.	"Heraclio Bernal"
6.	"Elena Y El Frances"
7.	"Valente Quintero"
8.	"Simon Blanco"
9.	"La Martina"
10.	"Tragedia De Oklahoma"
