= Exitos De Al Hurricane =

Album by Al Hurricane

Studio album by Al Hurricane
- Released: (United States) 1980?
- Genre: Latin music
- Label: Hurricane Records

Al Hurricane chronology
Madrecita, Te Debo Tanto (1979)	Exitos De Al Hurricane (1980)	Bandido (supergroup) albums (1980)

Exitos De Al Hurricane ("La Mula Bronca") is the eleventh album released by the New Mexican musician Al Hurricane in 1980?.

The lead single "La Mula Bronca" is one of Al Hurricane's more recognized rancheras.

== Track listing ==
No.	Title	Length
1.	"La Mula Bronca"
2.	"Hay Ojitos"
3.	"Nunca Pensaba"
4.	"Por Un Amor"
5.	"Prieta Casada"
6.	"Valentin de la Sierra"
7.	"Tengo Miedo"
8.	"Con Tu Amor"
9.	"El Pachuco"
10.	"Panchita"
