= La Prision de Santa Fe =

Studio album by Al Hurricane
- Released: (United States) 1979
- Genre: New Mexico music
- Label: Hurricane Records

Al Hurricane chronology
Cantan Corridos (1979)	La Prision de Santa Fe (1979)	Madrecita, Te Debo Tanto (1980)

La Prision de Santa Fe is the ninth full-length album released by the New Mexican musician Al Hurricane in 1980.

The lead single "(El Corrido De) La Prision De Santa Fe" is a song that tells the story of New Mexico State Penitentiary riot. According to Al Hurricane, he wrote the song to be "strictly narrative, not a subjective account or soapbox. The song does not attempt to assign blame."

== Track listing ==
No.	Title	Length
1.	"(El Corrido De) La Prision De Santa Fe [Long]"
2.	"Mi Madrecita"
3.	"El Corrido De Juanito"
4.	"(El Corrido De) La Prision De Santa Fe [Short]"
5.	"Sentimiento"
6.	"Tristes Noches"
7.	"La Distancia"
8.	"Tres Noches"
