= Instrumentales con Al Hurricane =

Studio album by Al Hurricane
- Released: (United States) November 26, 1973
- Genre: Instrumental, New Mexico music, Folk, Rock, Country/Western, and Latin music
- Label: Hurricane Records

Al Hurricane chronology
Corridos Canta (1973)	Instrumentales con Al Hurricane (1973)	Para Las Madrecitas (1974)

Instrumentales con Al Hurricane is the fifth full-length album released by the New Mexico musician Al Hurricane on November 26, 1973.

== Track listing ==
No.	Title	Length
1.	"La Cucaracha"	1:58
2.	"Mexico"	3:04
3.	"La Varsoviana #2"	1:33
4.	"Red River Valley (Valle Del Rio Colorado)"	2:08
5.	"Aguanta Corazon (Too Much Tequila)"	2:02
6.	"Jalisco"	2:27
7.	"Wheels (Ruedas)"	1:51
8.	"Isle of Capri (Isla De Capri)"	2:08
9.	"Pedro's Girlfriend (La Novia De Pedro)"	2:31
10.	"Capullito De Alheli"	1:59
11.	"Raunchy"	2:14
12.	"Mexican Cat (Gato Mexicano)"	2:21
