= Canciones del Alma =

Studio album by Al Hurricane
- Released: 1973?
- Genre: New Mexico music
- Label: Hurricane Records

Al Hurricane chronology
Mi Saxophone (1968)	Canciones del Alma (1973)	Sigue Cantando

Canciones del Alma is the second full-length album released by the New Mexico musician Al Hurricane in 1973?.

== Track listing ==
Side one
No.	Title	Length
1.	"Amor Perdido"
2.	"Cobarde Corazon"
3.	"La Bola Negra"
4.	"Cuatro Caminos"
5.	"Pá Todo El Año"
6.	"Dos Palomas"

Side two
No.	Title	Length
7.	"Mi Ultima Parranda"
8.	"Mi Burrita"
9.	"Rincon De Una Cantina"
10.	"Rosa Maria"
11.	"Amor De Los Dos"
12.	"La Mucura"
