= KXNM =

Simulcast of KANW
- Encino, New Mexico; United States
- Broadcast area: Central New Mexico
- Frequency: 88.7 MHz

Programming
- Format: Public radio; New Mexico music

Ownership
- Owner: Albuquerque Public Schools; (Board of Education of the City of Albuquerque NM)

History
- First air date: December 2010
- Call sign meaning: Station broadcast as The X

Technical information
- Licensing authority: FCC
- Facility ID: 172770
- Class: C3
- ERP: 18,000 watts
- HAAT: 89 meters (292 ft)
- Transmitter coordinates: 34°40′38.6″N 105°41′11.8″W

Links
- Public license information: Public file; LMS
- Website: KXNM on Facebook

KXNM is a non-commercial radio station licensed to Encino, New Mexico, and serving mainly Torrance County and other communities in Central New Mexico known as the Estancia Valley. KXNM is a simulcast of KANW in Albuquerque, and is owned by Albuquerque Public Schools. The station broadcasts an 18,000 watt signal at 88.7 MHz.

KXNM previously featured an extraordinarily eclectic music format comprising several genres including adult contemporary, country, smooth jazz, classical and oldies, among others. KXNM also provided community information concerning the local areas not frequently mentioned on near-by Albuquerque area stations. At the time, the station was owned by the KXNM Community Foundation and operated from studios in the town of McIntosh, New Mexico.

On August 8, 2022, KXNM announced on their Facebook page that the local format had come to an end and Albuquerque public radio station KANW would take over the operations and programming of KXNM. In 2024, the KXNM license was donated to the Albuquerque Board of Education.
