= Vestido Mojado =

Studio album by Al Hurricane
- Released: (United States) 1974
- Genre: New Mexico music
- Label: Hurricane Records

Al Hurricane chronology
| Para Las Madrecitas (1973) | Vestido Mojado (1974) | Cantan Corridos (1979) |

Vestido Mojado is the seventh full-length album released by the New Mexico musician Al Hurricane in 1974.

== Track listing ==
| No. | Title | Length |
|---|---|---|
| 1. | "Vestido Mojado" |
| 2. | "Por Eso No Debes" |
| 3. | "Vamos A Bailar" |
| 4. | "Mentira Nupcial" |
| 5. | "Paloma Herida" |
| 6. | "Frente Al Altar" |
| 7. | "Por Una Mujer Casada" |
| 8. | "Puño de Tierra" |
| 9. | "Deje Mis Padres" |
| 10. | "Dos Hojas Sin Rumbo" |
