= Sigue Cantando =

Studio album by Al Hurricane
- Released: (United States) 1973?
- Genre: New Mexico music
- Label: Hurricane Records

Al Hurricane chronology
Canciones del Alma (1973)	Sigue Cantando (1973)	Corridos Canta (1973)

Sigue Cantando is the third full-length album released by the New Mexico musician Al Hurricane in 1973?.

== Track listing ==
No.	Title	Length
1.	"Rumbo Al Sur"
2.	"Los Ojitos Provincianos"
3.	"La Media Vuelta"
4.	"Te Traigo En Mi Cartera"
5.	"Eres Casado"
6.	"Tres Dias"
7.	"Esta Noche"
8.	"Las Cinco Hernmanaas"
9.	"La Suegra Y El Yerno"
10.	"Me Piden"
11.	"La Cartita"
12.	"Ahora Por Ideas"
