= Mi Saxophone =

Studio album by Al Hurricane
- Released: (United States) 1968
- Genre: New Mexico music
- Length: 28:30
- Label: Hurricane Records

Al Hurricane chronology
Mi Saxophone (1968)	Canciones del Alma (1973)

Mi Saxophone is the first full-length album released by the New Mexico music performer Al Hurricane in 1968.

== Track listing ==
All tracks are written by Alberto Nelson Sanchez

No.	Title	Length
1.	"Mi Saxophone" (Spanish for "My Saxophone")	2:17
2.	"Tres Noches" (Spanish for "Three Nights")	2:32
3.	"Triste y Solito" (Spanish for "Sad and Alone")	2:56
4.	"Maldita Suerte" (Spanish for "Damn Lucky")	3:19
5.	"Sin Ti" (Spanish for "Without You".)	2:51
6.	"Sentimiento" (Spanish for "Sentimental". Covered by Selena on her Alpha L.P. in 1986 as "Sentimientos".)	2:41
7.	"El Burro Norteño" (Spanish for "The Northern Donkey".)	3:46
8.	"Con Lagrimitas" (Spanish for "With Little Tears".)	2:29
9.	"Sin Palabras" (Spanish for "Without Words".)	2:20
10.	"Noche Plateada" (Spanish for "Silver Night".)	2:52
