= KEDP =

Simulcast of KANW
- Las Vegas, New Mexico; United States
- Broadcast area: Las Vegas, New Mexico
- Frequency: 91.1 MHz

Programming
- Format: Public radio; New Mexico music
- Affiliations: NPR

Ownership
- Owner: Albuquerque Public Schools; (Board of Education of the City of Albuquerque)

History
- First air date: 1967

Technical information
- Licensing authority: FCC
- Facility ID: 4281
- Class: A
- ERP: 1,320 watts
- HAAT: −60.6 meters (−199 ft)
- Transmitter coordinates: 35°35′39″N 105°13′15″W

Links
- Public license information: Public file; LMS
- Webcast: Listen live
- Website: KANW Facilities page

KEDP (91.1 FM) is a radio station licensed to Las Vegas, New Mexico, United States. The station is owned by the Board of Education of the City of Albuquerque.

On February 6, 2021, KEDP began a collaboration with KANW in Albuquerque. On February 9, an application was filed with the Federal Communications Commission to transfer the license from the Board of Regents of New Mexico Highlands University to the Board of Education of the City of Albuquerque. The donation of the station's license was consummated on May 25, 2021.
