= Corridos Canta =

Studio album by Al Hurricane
- Released: 1973?
- Genre: New Mexico music
- Label: Hurricane Records

Al Hurricane chronology
Sigue Cantando	Corridos Canta	Instrumentales con Al Hurricane

Corridos Canta is the fourth full-length album released by the New Mexico musician Al Hurricane in 1973?.

== Track listing ==
No.	Title	Length
1.	"Reyes Ruiz"	4:40
2.	"El Hijo Desobediente"	3:20
3.	"Santa Amalia"	3:15
4.	"Gabino Barreras"	3:22
5.	"Los Dos Hermanos"	3:52
6.	"Corrido de Juanito"	3:59
7.	"Leandro Rodriguez"	4:52
8.	"Rosita Alvirez"	3:45
9.	"El Caballo Blanco"	2:41
10.	"Gregorio Cortez"	2:40
11.	"Lucio Vazquez"	2:47
12.	"Chavela"	5:32
