= KGGA =

Simulcast of KANW
- Gallup, New Mexico; United States
- Frequency: 88.1 MHz

Programming
- Format: Public radio; New Mexico music
- Affiliations: NPR

Ownership
- Owner: Albuquerque Public Schools; (Board of Education of the City of Albuquerque, NM)

History
- First air date: 2008
- Former call signs: KKNM (CP, 2005–2007)

Technical information
- Licensing authority: FCC
- Facility ID: 94220
- Class: A
- ERP: 1,000 watts
- HAAT: 5 meters (16 ft)
- Transmitter coordinates: 35°32′27″N 108°44′36″W

Links
- Public license information: Public file; LMS

KGGA (88.1 FM) is a radio station licensed to serve Gallup, New Mexico, United States. The station is owned by the Board of Education of the City of Albuquerque, New Mexico.
