= Bandido (supergroup) =

New Mexico music supergroup

- Origin: United States
- Genres: Latin music, New Mexico music
- Years active: 1980s
- Past members: Al Hurricane; Al Hurricane Jr.; Baby Gaby; Tiny Morrie

Bandido were a New Mexico music supergroup that released several albums during the 1980s. They released three studio albums, and a compilation album. All of their releases charted along the west coast, Chicago, and internationally in Germany, Venezuela, and Spain.

Their frontman Al Hurricane, as well as his son Al Hurricane Jr., spoke fondly of their time with the band but reiterated their desire to return to their New Mexico music audience; as they felt that Bandido's sound was more akin to Latin music. The three Bandido albums comprise Al Hurricane's twelfth, fourteenth, and fifteenth albums. Between the first and second Bandido releases Al Hurricane Sr. and Jr. released 15 Exitos Rancheros alongside Tiny Morrie.

== Albums ==
=== Bandido's first release (track listing) ===
No.	Title	Length
1.	"Si Volviera Ese Amor"
2.	"Nada Va Bien"
3.	"No Me Lo Vas A Creer"
4.	"Ya No Me Interesa"
5.	"Seis Rosas Amarillas"
6.	"Te Quiero"
7.	"Mil Años"
8.	"Carolina"
9.	"Solitario Estoy"
10.	"Lagrimitas"

=== Bandido's second release (track listing) ===
No.	Title	Length
1.	"Vuelve Paloma"
2.	"Si No Es Por Amor A Mi"
3.	"Equivocada"
4.	"A Ver Si Es de Verdad"
5.	"La Del Cabello Rizo"
6.	"Hey, Hey"
7.	"Regresaras"
8.	"Veronica"
9.	"Llego Tu Carta"
10.	"Amarrame A Ti"

=== Bandido's third release (track listing) ===
No.	Title	Length
1.	"Como Ruleta"
2.	"Flor de Papa"
3.	"Quien Quiere Este Corazon"
4.	"No Hay Amor"
5.	"No Pasara Lo Mismo"
6.	"Saquenle La Vuelta Al Chicle"
7.	"Tenemos Que Sufrir"
8.	"Tu Puedes"
9.	"El Manantial"
