= Freddie Brown (musician) =

American songwriter (1940–2002)

- Born: Alfredo E. Brown; December 4, 1940; Winston, New Mexico, US
- Origin: New Mexico
- Died: April 30, 2002 (aged 61) Phoenix, Arizona, US
- Genres: New Mexico music, Country, Latin music, Western, Rock
- Instruments: Vocals, guitar

Alfredo "Freddie" Brown (December 4, 1940 – April 30, 2002) was an American singer-songwriter, known for his contributions to New Mexico music and his ability to seamlessly switch between country music and Spanish music.

== Biography ==
Alfredo "Freddie" Brown was born in Winston, New Mexico, to Alfred C. Brown and Mary Brown. His sons, Bo Brown and AB, continue to perform music; Bo Brown is a New Mexico musician, and AB is an R&B musician.

== Discography ==
=== Albums ===
- El Versatil
- El Sensacional
- Borracho Perdido
- From: All Of Me

=== Compilations ===
- The Immortal Freddie Brown
- His Life Story
- His Heart & Soul
- Recuerdos De Freddie Brown Vol. 1
- Recuerdos De Freddie Brown Vol. 1
