= Harry O'Neill (cartoonist) =

American cartoonist (c.1892–1958)

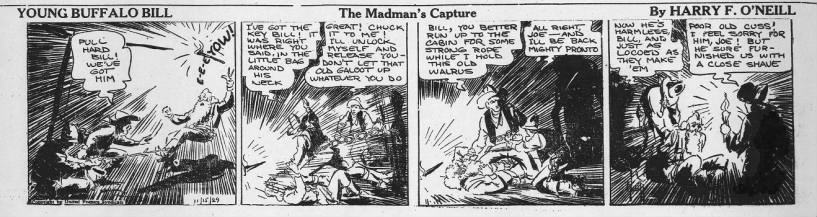
Young Buffalo Bill, November 15, 1929

Harry O'Neill (c. 1892 – April 1, 1958) was an American cartoonist. A native of Baltimore, he drew sports cartoons for The Baltimore Sun. From 1927 to 1950, he drew the daily comic strip Broncho Bill, which was syndicated in 130 newspapers. It was named for William "Broncho Bill" Walters, with previously names including Young Buffalo Bill and Buckaroo Bill. In 1950, Broncho Bill was sold to United Feature Syndicate. From 1950 until his death, he worked as a freelance artist. He died on April 1, 1958, aged 66, in Yonkers, New York.
