= Los Lunas High School =

Coordinates: 34°49′07″N 106°45′21″W

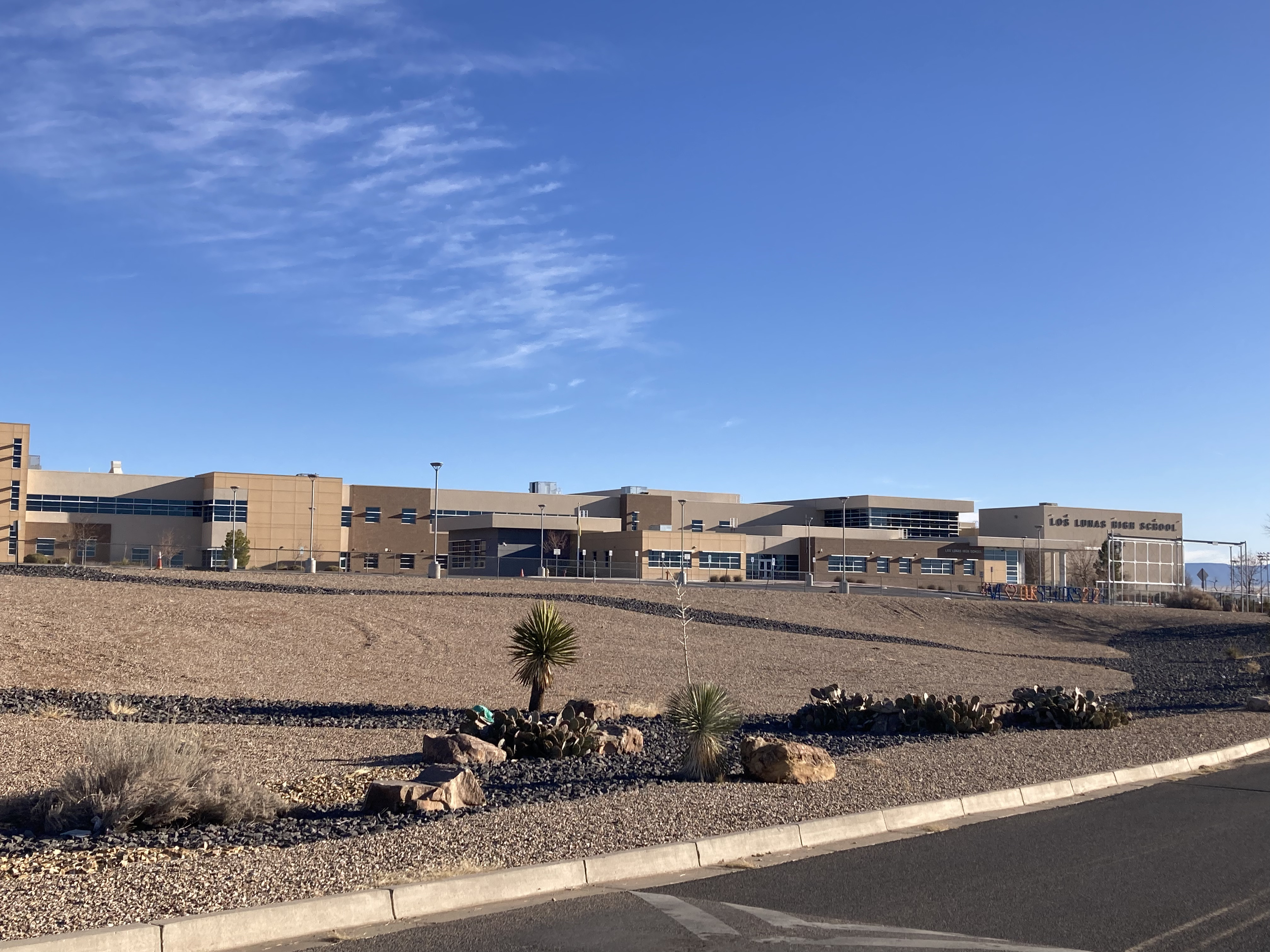
- Los Lunas, NM; United States

Information
- Type: Public High School
- Established: 1926
- Principal: of Upperclassmen: New hire approx. June 2009
- Dean Principal Principal Activities: of Students: Brian Baca of Prep. Academy: Julie Smith of Underclassmen: Robert Stevens; Director: Pam Davis
- Teaching staff: 78.06 (FTE)
- Grades: 9 to 12
- Enrollment: 1,450 (2023-2024)
- Student to teacher ratio: 18.58
- Colors: Royal Blue, Orange
- Athletics: 5A
- Mascot: Tiger
- Coordinators: Registrar: Counseling: Prep. Academy: Dusty Price; Cindy Giron; Freshmen: Rhonda Flores; Sophomores: Pete Bustamante; Juniors: Etta Delgato; Seniors: Natalie Siaz, Jamie Wilson
- Website: http://llhs.llschools.net

Los Lunas High School is a public high school in Los Lunas, New Mexico.

== History ==
Los Lunas High School was founded in 1926 as Solomon Luna High School. It was named for Solomon Luna, the most prominent political and financial leader of the area at the time. The school was created to ease travel to Belen High School in southern Valencia County. Solomon Luna High School was consolidated into the Los Lunas Public Schools in 1945 and later renamed to "Los Lunas High School."

The main building of old Soloman Luna High School still stands, and currently serves as the administration offices of the Los Lunas School District. An engraving above that building's main doors continues to read "Soloman Luna High School."

Los Lunas High School's rival within its school district rival is Valencia High School. The main in-county rival is Belen High School.

For the 2010–2011 through 2013–2014 school years, the Tiger athletic teams are set to compete in Class 4A in a district that includes local rivals Belen and Valencia.

== Performing arts ==
The Los Lunas High School Tiger Band received third-place and Outstanding Brass in class 4A during the 2008 NM Pageant of Bands in Albuquerque. It was disqualified in 2010 at the same competition. The bands also received 10th place in finals competition and seventh place in preliminary competition at the 2004 NMSU Tournament of Bands; this was the first time the band placed in the top 10 at this event.

== Sports ==
The Tiger athletic teams have had modest success through the years in terms of winning championships, but are nearly always competitive. LLHS teams have often been placed in districts alongside some of the top programs in the state.

== Popular culture ==
In 2007, the Albuquerque Journal revealed that the high school had been used for the filming of the first season of Breaking Bad. Los Lunas High School's campus and likeness were used to portray the fictional Division II school Los Lunas College in the USA Network original series In Plain Sight.

University Arena, more commonly known as "'The Pit,'" was used to establish shots during the film as all metro collegiate basketball games occur in this arena; however, the scenes were filmed at Los Lunas High School.

== Notable people ==
- Brian Baca, educator and member of the New Mexico House of Representatives
- Chuck Aragon (1977), middle-distance runner
- El Gringo (1994), musician
- Teige Morrell (2014), professional basketball player

== See also ==
- Los Lunas, New Mexico
- List of high schools in New Mexico
