= Music of New Mexico =

New Mexico is a state of the Southwest United States. The state has music traditions dating back to the ancient Anasazi and Pueblo people, Navajo, Apache, and the Spanish Santa Fe de Nuevo México; these old traditions are found in both their original folk forms and as a modern folk genre known as New Mexico music.

In the 1950s and 60s, the town of Clovis was home to the Norman Petty Recording Studios, where Buddy Holly, Roy Orbison, and Waylon Jennings recorded. A well-known 1960s group hailing from New Mexico was The Fireballs scoring a #1 Hot 100 hit in 1963 called "Sugar Shack". Native American rock group Xit were signed and recorded Plight of the Redman (1972) and Silent Warrior (1973) for a subsidiary of Motown Records, Rare Earth Records. During the 1970s and 80s, New Mexico musicians Al Hurricane and Al Hurricane Jr. became recognized on the nationally and internationally syndicated Val De La O Show.

The English-language state song of New Mexico is "O Fair New Mexico", adopted by the state legislature in 1917. In 1971, "Así Es Nuevo México" was adopted as the Spanish-language state song. In 1989, the legislature adopted "Land of Enchantment" by Michael Martin Murphey as the official state ballad; and in 1995, the legislature adopted "New Mexico - Mi Lindo Nuevo México" by Pablo Mares as the state's official bilingual state song.

== History ==
New Mexico's heritage studies and inquiries into the unique past of the area reveal that the violin was introduced into New Mexico long before Europeans brought polka and other folk forms to the east coast; several studies confirm the long history of violin playing in New Mexico. The New Mexico Musical Heritage Project continues to play the music of early New Mexico, while learning the violin building techniques used in the pueblos to convert the natives through music.

The first inhabitants of New Mexico were Native Americans, followed by Spaniards in the sixteenth century. In 1821 the land was ceded to Mexico, and in 1848 it became a territory of the United States. The cultures of each of these groups has influenced the music of New Mexico in unique ways.

== Genres ==
=== Native American music ===
Native American music has wide representation in New Mexico, as the state is home to the second largest Native American population percentage in the US. One such example is Taos Pueblo's Robert Mirabal who received two Grammy Awards. An entirely unique genre of Latin music, directly related to the Pueblo, mestizo Hispano, and other Native affiliated groups, called New Mexico music has a sizable audience in the state.

=== New Mexico music ===
Pioneered by the ancient Pueblo people, and by the folk music of Hispanos of New Mexico. Artists such as Antonia Apodaca and Al Hurricane popularized the genre, with Al Hurricane blending Country, Western, Rock, and Jazz into the sound. Modern Latin Pop musicians Lorenzo Antonio and Sparx have continued to crossover New Mexico with other popular music styles. The largest radio market in the state, Albuquerque, has two major FM stations primarily broadcasting the genre, those being KANW and KNMM. There are several annual series' of albums, including; KANW's New Mexico Music series, New Mexico Spanish Super Stars, and Los 15 Grandes de Nuevo México.

=== Orchestral and classical music ===
The New Mexico Philharmonic continues the long tradition of the now defunct New Mexico Symphony Orchestra, who had been performing since 1932. Other Classical music institutions in the state include the Taos School of Music, the Santa Fe Community Orchestra and the Santa Fe Symphony Orchestra and Chorus.

=== Country music ===
In the formative era of modern country music, many notable figures passed through New Mexico. Around 1927, Bob Wills lived in Roy, New Mexico where he was influenced by contemporary Hispanic dancehall styles. Between 1954 and 1960, a young Glen Campbell was living in Albuquerque and performing for live audiences and his uncle, Dick Bills', radio program. Contemporary performers of Country and Western music residing in New Mexico include Michael Martin Murphey of Red River and Handsome Family of Albuquerque, who relocated from Chicago in 2001.The town of Ruidoso is home to the Lincoln County Cowboy Symposium - now known as CowboyFest - which features music.

=== Rock music ===
From 1954 through the -60s, a recording studio operated by Norman Petty in Clovis was responsible for several notable Buddy Holly tracks. In 2002, a song called "New Slang" was heard on TV commercials across the country. The group was The Shins, which became a perennial favorite among indie folk/pop/rock fans worldwide. The next international success came when a young Santa Fe and Albuquerque resident Zach Condon formed an ethno/world influenced band called Beirut.

== Music festivals ==
The city of Santa Fe, New Mexico is home to the Santa Fe International Festival of New Music, the Santa Fe Chamber Music Festival, and the Santa Fe Opera. Taos is home to the Taos Solar Music Festival. June is the month for many festivals in New Mexico. Besides Taos Solar Music Festival at the end of June, there is Southwest Roots Music Festival, also called the Thirsty Ear Music Festival that takes place in the middle of June just outside Santa Fe at the famous western movie set. Festival features well-known artists representing the roots of folk, blues, bluegrass, and world music.

The University of New Mexico's John Donald Robb Composers’ Symposium has been and continues to be one of the central contemporary music events in the US Southwest. The symposium began in 1972 when UNM Music Professor William Wood invited his former teacher, Norman Lockwood, to the campus, where his compositions were performed, along with the works of UNM music composition students. In 1999, the symposium was renamed the John Donald Robb Composers’ Symposium. The symposium is now presented jointly by the John Donald Robb Musical Trust and the UNM Department of Music. The Symposium brings international composers and performers to the University of New Mexico campus for four to six long days of concerts, seminars, masterclasses, and public talks. The numerous concerts and events are all made free to the public, making the Symposium an inclusive listening opportunity that welcomes in audiences and serves them entirely new sonic experiences, as well as showcasing the talents of UNM faculty and students, alongside national and international guest artists. Guest composers have included Robert Ashley, Milton Babbitt, Anthony Braxton, Martin Bresnick, John Cage, Raven Chacon, Chen Yi, Michael Colgrass, George Crumb, Julio Estrada, Lukas Foss, Lou Harrison, Alan Hovhaness, Karel Husa, John Harbison, Ernst Krenek, Libby Larsen, Lei Liang, John Lewis, Thea Musgrave, Pauline Oliveros, Hilda Paredes, Vincent Persichetti, Roger Reynolds, Ned Rorem, Maria Schneider, Gunther Schuller, Cecil Taylor, James Tenney, Joan Tower, Christian Wolff. Directors of the Symposium include: Christopher Shultis, Peter Gilbert, and Karola Obermüller.

Another festival in New Mexico is Globalquerque taking place at the end of every September since 2005 at the Hispanic Cultural Center in Albuquerque. It features music from all continents (folk/ethno/pop) as well as some Native American and Hispanic acts.

=== Small venues ===
Red River in Northern New Mexico hosts a Blues festival in early June, in addition to Larry Joe Taylor's Music Festival and Chili Cookoff.

In Taos, the Taos Inn host nightly music performances.

== Musicians ==
Musicians and bands associated with New Mexico include:

- Rahim AlHaj
- Bob Andrews
- Antonia Apodaca
- Beirut
- Andru Bemis
- Freddie Brown
- Richard Cameron-Wolfe
- Glen Campbell
- Raven Chacon
- Chezile
- John Denver
- Bo Diddley
- Deuter
- The Echoing Green
- Bradley Ellingboe
- The Eyeliners
- The Fireballs
- Peter Gilbert (composer)
- Eliza Gilkyson
- Handsome Family
- A Hawk and a Hacksaw
- Joy Harjo
- Hazeldine
- Tish Hinojosa
- Al Hurricane
- Last Day Parade
- Leiahdorus
- Lowercase Noises
- Ottmar Liebert
- John Aaron Lewis
- Demi Lovato
- Consuelo Luz
- Herbie Mann
- Eric McFadden
- Old Man Gloom
- Pictureplane
- Macklemore
- Robert Mirabal
- Michael Martin Murphey
- Karola Obermueller
- Romanovsky and Phillips
- The Rondelles
- Wendy Rule
- Scared of Chaka
- Bernadette Seacrest
- The Shins
- Hillary Smith
- Sonny Throckmorton
- Treadmill
- Tony Vincent
- Wagogo
- XIT
