= El Gringo (musician) =

American singer-songwriter

Shawn Brooks Kiehne (born July 3, 1976) is an American New Mexico musician from Los Lunas, New Mexico, he is best known by his Norteño stagename El Gringo, he also performs country music under the name Shawn Brooks.

Kiehne, who is of German heritage, was born in Los Lunas and graduated from Los Lunas High School. Kiehne learned Spanish working at his family's ranch in the El Paso, Texas area. In 2003 he began writing songs in the language. In 2005 he won second place in El Gigante de Mañana and his first album, Algo Secuedió, was released later the same year.
