= A Tribute to Al Hurricane =

- Venue: Isleta Casino & Showroom
- Associated albums: A Tribute to Al Hurricane "The Godfather" DVD (2008); A Tribute To Al Hurricane - Live, Vol. 1 album (2008); A Tribute To Al Hurricane - Live, Vol. 2 album (2008)
- Date(s): April 21, 2007

A Tribute to Al Hurricane was a tribute concert held for Al Hurricane, on April 21, 2007 at Isleta Casino & Showroom.

== Concert ==
The concert had Al Hurricane and his mother, Bennie Sanchez, sitting on stage in couches. While they were entertained by various performers, from throughout Al Hurricane's career. Several performers, such as Al's brother Tiny Morrie got Al to help perform on "La Puerta Negra" and Darren Cordova performed "Mi Amigo" with Al. There was an award presented to Al Hurricane by KANW. Al even performed several songs at the end of the concert, and thanked the performers and audience.

== Setlist ==
1. Intro
2. La Varsoviana #2
  - AJ Martinez
3. Por El Amor A Mi Madre
  - Matt Duran
4. Fallaste Corazon
  - Robbie Jude
5. Filomeno
  - Mari
6. Amaneci En Tus Brazos
  - Rigoberto Trejo (Los Chavos)
7. Mi Saxophone
  - Bryan Olivas
8. La Mucura
  - Bryan Olivas
9. Juan Charrasqueado
  - Mariachi Paisano Del Valle
10. Tepito Senial
  - Donna Christine
11. El Dia De San Juan
  - Charlie Pohl
12. El Rencor
  - Charlie Pohl
13. Frente Al Altar
  - Steve Chavez
14. Baila, Bailame / Pirolino
  - Sorela
15. Hay Ojitos
  - Miguelito Romero Sr. & Miguelito Romero Jr.
16. Mi Ultima Parranda
  - Jerry Dean
17. Amor Perdido
  - Jerry Dean
18. Vestido Mojado
  - Milford Salazar (Purple Haze)
19. Rumbo Al Sur
  - Milford Salazar (Purple Haze)
20. Entre Besos
  - Louise Sanchez (Blue Ventures)
21. Quiero Que Sepas
  - Harold Sanchez (Blue Ventures)
22. La Que Se Fue
  - Matthew Martinez
23. Carino Nuevo
  - Matthew Martinez
24. Carmelita
  - Tiny Morrie
25. La Puerta Negra
  - Tiny Morrie
26. Mi Madrecita
  - Baby Gaby
27. Maldita Suerte
  - Baby Gaby
28. Sentimiento
  - Al Hurricane Jr.
29. Siempre
  - Al Hurricane Jr.
30. La Martina
  - Al Hurricane Jr., Donna Christine, Miguelito Romero
31. Como Ruleta
  - Darren Cordova
32. Mi Amigo
  - Al Hurricane & Darren Cordova
33. 89.1 KANW Award Presentation
34. Ay, Ay, Ay Que Borracho Vengo
  - Al Hurricane
35. Al Hurricane expresses his appreciation
36. Jambalaya
  - Al Hurricane
37. El Rey
  - Al Hurricane
38. Finale
39. Credits

== Home releases ==
This concert was recorded and released in three separate releases, a video DVD and two albums.

=== A Tribute to Al Hurricane "The Godfather" DVD ===
A Tribute to Al Hurricane "The Godfather" was the DVD release of the concert in its entirety. It featured slideshows, and announcements explaining the upcoming musicians and their songs of choice.

=== A Tribute To Al Hurricane Vol. 1 ===
==== Track listing ====
No.	Title	artist	Length
1.	"Jambalaya" (composed by Hank Williams)	Al Hurricane	3:39
2.	"Frente Al Altar" (composed by Jesus Monreal / Fortino Rodriguez)	Steve Chavez	3:32
3.	"Sentimiento" (composed by Al Hurricane)	Al Hurricane Jr.	3:07
4.	"Vestido Mojado"	Milford Salazar (Purple Haze)	3:21
5.	"Carmelita"	Tiny Morrie	2:46
6.	"La Que Se Fue"	Matthew Martinez	2:20
7.	"Mi Ultima Parranda"	Jerry Dean	3:01
8.	"Quiero Que Sepas"	Blue Ventures	2:57
9.	"Maldita Suerte"	Baby Gaby	3:30
10.	"El Dia De San Juan"	Charlie Pohl	3:34
11.	"Por El Amor A Mi Madre"	Matt Duran	2:41
12.	"Tepito Señorial"	Donna Christine	3:11
13.	"Mi Saxophone"	Bryan Olivas	2:45
14.	"La Varsoviana #2"	AJ Martinez	2:44
15.	"Hay Ojitos"	Miguelito Romero Sr. & Miguelito Romero Jr.	3:17
16.	"Amaneci En Tus Brazos"	Rigo Trejo (Los Chavos)	3:16
17.	"Mi Amigo"	Al Hurricane & Darren Cordova	4:17

=== A Tribute To Al Hurricane Vol. 2 ===
==== Track listing ====
No.	Title	artist	Length
1.	"Ay, Ay, Ay Que Borracho Vengo"	Al Hurricane	2:57
2.	"Como Ruleta"	Darren Cordova	3:05
3.	"Siempre"	Al Hurricane Jr.	3:28
4.	"Rumbo Al Sur"	Milford Salazar (Purple Haze)	2:46
5.	"La Puerta Negra"	Tiny Morrie & Al Hurricane	3:27
6.	"Cariño Nuevo"	Matthew Martinez	2:54
7.	"Amor Perdido"	Jerry Dean	2:55
8.	"Entre Besos"	Blue Ventures	2:57
9.	"La Martina"	Al Hurricane Jr., Donna Christine, Miguelito Romero	2:51
10.	"Filomeno"	Mari	3:27
11.	"Mi Madrecita"	Baby Gaby	3:30
12.	"La Mucura"	Bryan Olivas	3:48
13.	"El Rencor"	Charlie Pohl	3:36
14.	"Fallaste Corazón"	Robbie Jude	3:32
15.	"Baila, Bailame"	Sorela	4:26
16.	"Juan Charrasqueado"	Mariachi Paisano Del Valle	3:49
17.	"El Rey"	Al Hurricane	3:58
