= Enrique Lamadrid =

American historian (born 1942)

- Born: Enrique Lamadrid; December 6, 1942 (age 83); Embudo, New Mexico, U.S.
- Education: University of New Mexico; University of Southern California
- Occupations: Historian author
- Employer: University of New Mexico (Professor Emeritus)
- Known for: Chicano Hispano Mexicano Studies

Enrique Lamadrid (born December 12, 1942) is an American historian in the US state of New Mexico, known for his studies of Chicano, Mexican American, and Hispano culture. He is Professor Emeritus for the Department of Spanish and Portuguese at University of New Mexico. He has worked for the Smithsonian Institution, Museum of New Mexico, and the National Hispanic Cultural Center. He has written books in both English and Spanish.

== Bibliography ==
- Lamadrid, Enrique R. (1972). Cantos del coyote : poems. Associated Gold Street Olive Press. OCLC 8665825.
- Lamadrid, Enrique R. (1985). Shadow of the volcano. Hispanic Research Center, Arizona State University. OCLC 28840572.
- Lamadrid, Enrique R., Mares, E. A. (1988). En breve : minimalism in Mexican poetry, 1900–1985. Tooth of Time Books. ISBN 9780940510173. OCLC 948940512.
- Lamadrid, Enrique R. (1993). Entre c??bolos criado : images of Native Americans in the popular culture of colonial New Mexico. University of Arizona Press. OCLC 42602073.
- Tesoros del espiritu : a portrait in sound of Hispanic New Mexico. Academia El Norte Publications. 1994. ISBN 0-929820-05-3. OCLC 1025807707.
- Lamadrid, Enrique R. (2003). Hermanitos comanchitos : Indo-Hispano rituals of captivity and redemption (in English and Spanish). University of New Mexico Press. ISBN 9780826328779. OCLC 607029950.
- El Camino Real de Tierra Adentro. 2005. OCLC 122930280.
- Lamadrid, Enrique R. (2011). Amadito and the hero children. ISBN 978-0-8263-4980-4. OCLC 1129582908.

=== Spanish translations ===
- Anaya, Rudolfo A.; Córdova, Amy; Lamadrid, Enrique E. (2004). The santero's miracle : a bilingual story. Albuquerque: University of New Mexico Press. ISBN 0-8263-2847-4. OCLC 53975512.
- Anaya, Rudolfo A.; Lamadrid, Enrique R.; Córdova, Amy (2007). The first tortilla : a bilingual story. Albuquerque: University of New Mexico Press. ISBN 978-0-8263-4214-0. OCLC 84152665.
