= María de las Mercedes Adam de Aróstegui =

Cuban pianist and composer

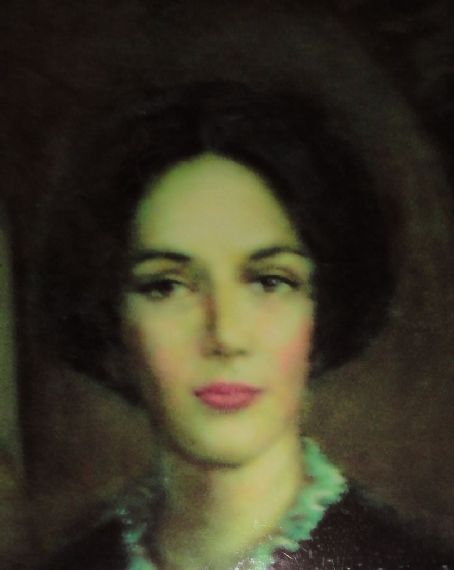
- María de las Mercedes Adam de Aróstegui
- Born: 24 September 1873; Camagüey, Cuba
- Died: 20 October 1957 (aged 84); Madrid, Spain
- Musical career
- Occupations: Musician, composer
- Instrument: Piano

María Emma de las Mercedes Adam de Aróstegui (24 September 1873 – 20 October 1957) was a Cuban pianist and composer who lived and worked in Spain. She was born in Camagüey, Cuba, and moved to Spain with her family when she was nine years old. She studied with Joaquin Zuazagoitia in Santiago de Compostela and continued her studies in the Conservatorio Real in Madrid. She studied with Louis Diemer and Jules Massenet in Paris and with Vincent d'Indy.

After completing her education, she worked as a composer and pianist, giving concerts with Pablo Casals. Her music was performed in Paris and in Cuba. She died in Madrid.

== Works ==
Selected works include:

- Serenata Española
- La Peregrinacion de Childe Harold
- Poemo sinfonico
- En el Campo de Waterloo
- La vida de sueño, opera
- La infancia
- Danzas Cubanas
- Seranata andaluza
- Ballade guerriere ecossaise (text: Sir Walter Scott)
- A une femme for voice and cello

She also published an essay La etica y la estitica en la obra musical.
