= Anasazi flute =

Prehistoric flute found in Arizona, USA

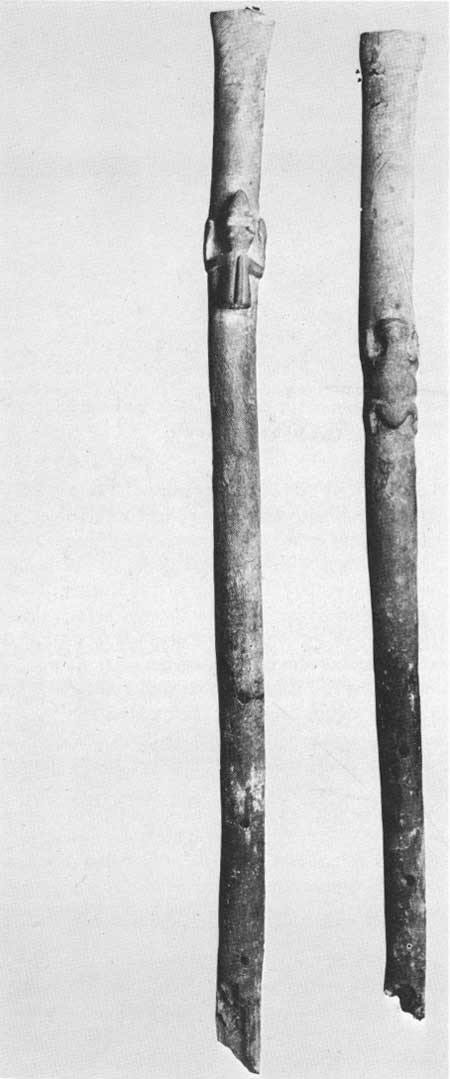
Flutes carved with tadpoles found in Pueblo Bonito in the Chaco Culture National Historical Park.

The Anasazi flute, named for the Anasazi people, is a prehistoric end-blown flute replicated today from findings at a massive cave in Prayer Rock Valley in Arizona, United States by an archaeological expedition led by Earl H. Morris in 1931. The team excavated 15 caves; the largest among them had 16 dwellings and many artifacts, including several wooden flutes, which gave the site its name, the Broken Flute Cave.

The flutes found in the cave were dated between 620 and 670 AD. They were all made of box elder, have six finger holes and are end-blown. It is similar in many respects to a Hopi flute, which has only five finger holes.

A detailed analysis using radiocarbon dating techniques was published in 2007. The analysis included one item from a burial pit in the Broken Flute Cave. The dating placed the artifact in the range 599–769 AD.

The Anasazi flute has in recent years been reproduced and restored to the catalog of world flutes. While difficult to play in many respects, it has a rich, warm voice that can potentially span over three octaves.

== See also ==
- Kokopelli
