= Manuel de Aróstegui Sáenz de Olamendi =

Spanish politician

Manuel de Aróstegui Sáenz de Olamendi (March 24, 1758 – November 7, 1813) was a liberal Spanish politician from the Basque Country.
