= Val De La O Show =

- Genre: Music variety show
- Created by: Valentino De La O
- Starring: Valentino De La O, with Juan Raigoza and Mario Leyba
- Country of origin: United States
- Original language: Spanish

Production
- Production locations: Albuquerque, New Mexico

Original release
- Release: 1960 – 1985

Val De La O Show is an American television music variety show hosted by Valentino De La O. The series was produced by NBC-affiliate KOB. The show was nationally and internationally syndicated in the United States and Mexico, and several outlets referred to the host in the show being the "Spanish Equivalent of Johnny Carson". The show was among the first Spanish-language programs to seek national syndication, and was the first to actually become widely syndicated. This widespread syndication, to over 20 large national broadcast networks, was due to multiple syndication efforts.

The host jokingly said, of the show, "we are the typical 20-year overnight success story." The show featured many celebrities, such as Anthony Quinn, Ricardo Montalbán, José Feliciano, Antonio Aguilar, Pedro Vargas, Lucha Villa, Lola Beltrán, Ken Curtis who played Festus in "Gunsmoke", Kirk Douglas, Muhammad Ali, Don Knotts, Johnny Weissmueller, and Freddy Fender. It also featured musicians such as Baby Gaby, Roberto Griego, Al Hurricane, Al Hurricane Jr., and René Ornelas (René y René); since the show contained performances by local New Mexico and Texas musicians, the show also brought national and international attention to Tejano and New Mexico music.

== History ==
In 1960, the television show began as a half-hour variety/talk show format on KOAT-TV, an ABC affiliate. It was a short stint as it was terminated a year later. The show host, and the show itself, were then asked to join KGGM-TV (CBS affiliate), now KRQE. He was there approximately 4 years until 1964, when his show moved to NBC-affiliate KOB. This turned out to be the longest running station for him and the show. He stayed with the NBC affiliate until 1985, during this time, the Val De La O Show became a local favorite, due in part to the chemistry he developed between his co-stars, Juan Raigoza and Mario Leyba. The show went into national syndication and by 1980 it was seen from coast to coast, from New York to Los Angeles. His humor and guest line-up was among the most cited reasons his show became so popular. As his popularity grew, he was recognized by movie studios and record companies as an ideal venue to promote movies and music to the Hispanic audience. As a result, he interviewed and featured many internationally recognized celebrities, as well as several entertainers from Texas and New Mexico. Also appearing on the show were political figures, such as; New Mexico Governor Jerry Apodaca, NM Lieutenant Governor Roberto Mondragón and Reies Tijerina. Val was a pioneer in the Hispanic television market in the US. Because of Val's flourishing career that began at a very young age, he became a role model for rising hopefuls in the music and TV industry. At this time, it was a difficult market to penetrate, but Val was credited for opening the doors for many Hispanic television personalities and gave many "up and coming" young talents their first television break by featuring them on his variety show. Ultimately, most of them went on to become stars in their own right.

In 1985, due to the dramatic and ever evolving changes in the National Hispanic Television market, Val ended the production of his show. The show continued to run until 1989, in syndicated reruns, due to contractual obligations. In the early 1980s Val developed an interest in alternative health care and decided to pursue a career in naturopathic medicine. Shortly after, he enrolled at Trinity School of Natural Medicine and graduated as a naturopathic doctor in 1991. During this time, he opened several nutritional stores in New Mexico, Texas, and Colorado. After a long career, Val is currently enjoying retirement.

=== Host ===
At a young age, Val's parents and siblings moved from Colorado to Hatch, New Mexico to start a family farm, which is where he was raised. Val De La O, short for Valentino, was born in Greeley, Colorado on May 5, 1936, to parents, Rafael De La O and Herminia Torres. His siblings are brother Aguinaldo (Nel), twin sisters, Belen and Sophie, and sister, Rachel. In 1941, Val's parents and siblings moved to Hatch, NM to start a family farm. The farm provided a good supplement to their limited income. Val was fortunate that his parents instilled in him a strong work ethic and a belief that you could achieve anything if you worked hard enough. In 1954, Val graduated from Hatch Valley High School and earned a Ford Foundation scholarship to attend the University of New Mexico in Albuquerque. Due to his studious nature and talent, Val went on to attend Boy's state and All State chorus and was editor of the yearbook. Unfortunately, when his father took ill, Val returned to Hatch, NM in 1956 to take over the family farm. Later on, he continued his studies. While attending UNM, Val met Calaya Trujillo, whom he subsequently married in 1958. They had three daughters; Novela, Cristal and Carmela. Carmela is developmentally challenged and to this day, still resides in the loving care of her parents. As a teenager, Val always had a love for music and both he and his brother Nel had great singing voices. Some of his many heroes were, El Trio Los Panchos, and through their inspiration he and his brother Nel, learned to play the guitar. While at UNM, Val would perform in various venues to earn pocket money. A few years later Val, along with his brother Nel, recorded an album of their favorite popular Mexican-Spanish songs. Val worked for several radio stations, including KLOS & KABQ-FM among others.

In the early 1980s, Val developed an interest in alternative health care and decided to pursue a career in Naturopathic medicine. Shortly after, he enrolled at Trinity School of Natural Medicine and graduated as a Naturopathic Doctor in 1991. During this time, he opened several nutritional stores in New Mexico, Texas, and Colorado.
