= Rociada, New Mexico =

Unincorporated community in New Mexico, United States

- Unincorporated community
- Interactive map of Rociada, New Mexico
- Coordinates: 35°49′56″N 105°25′15″W
- Country: United States
- State: New Mexico
- County: San Miguel
- Elevation: 7,536 ft (2,297 m)

Population (2010)
  - Total: 609
- Time zone: UTC-7 (Mountain (MST))
  - Summer (DST): UTC-6 (MDT)
- Zip code: 87742
- Area code: 505
- GNIS 912004: 910357

Rociada is a settled area in San Miguel County, New Mexico, United States, located 27 miles northwest of Las Vegas, the county seat. Rociada's name means "sprinkled with dew" in Spanish, reflecting its relatively high-elevation, mild, and moist climate in the summer compared to hot and arid areas of Northern New Mexico.

The Pendaries Gristmill, one mile east of Rociada is perhaps the best preserved gristmill in New Mexico. Built in the 1870s, the building is on the U.S. National Register of Historic Places.

The Calf Canyon/Hermits Peak Fire (April to August 2022), one of the largest in New Mexico history, destroyed the forests on all the hillsides around the Rociada valley. Heavy monsoon rains resulted in flooding caused by water runoff from the denuded slopes. The area was evacuated during the fire.

== Notable people ==
- Antonia Apodaca (1923–2020), a musician and songwriter was born and raised in Rociada.
- José A. Baca (1876–1924), the 5th Lieutenant Governor of New Mexico and his wife Marguerite Pendaries Baca (1876–1971), the 6th Secretary of State of New Mexico had a large ranch near Rociada.

== Climate ==
Climate data for Gascon (Rociada), New Mexico, 1991–2020 normals, 1953-2020 extremes: 8250ft (2515m)
Month	Jan	Feb	Mar	Apr	May	Jun	Jul	Aug	Sep	Oct	Nov	Dec	Year
Record high °F (°C)	71 (22)	70 (21)	78 (26)	78 (26)	85 (29)	90 (32)	91 (33)	92 (33)	89 (32)	82 (28)	74 (23)	72 (22)	92 (33)
Mean maximum °F (°C)	59.6 (15.3)	59.1 (15.1)	64.0 (17.8)	67.8 (19.9)	75.4 (24.1)	84.2 (29.0)	83.1 (28.4)	80.9 (27.2)	78.6 (25.9)	73.6 (23.1)	66.8 (19.3)	60.2 (15.7)	85.8 (29.9)
Mean daily maximum °F (°C)	44.3 (6.8)	45.1 (7.3)	51.2 (10.7)	56.6 (13.7)	65.1 (18.4)	75.0 (23.9)	76.0 (24.4)	73.9 (23.3)	69.4 (20.8)	61.3 (16.3)	51.8 (11.0)	44.0 (6.7)	59.5 (15.3)
Daily mean °F (°C)	31.3 (−0.4)	32.6 (0.3)	37.7 (3.2)	42.9 (6.1)	50.6 (10.3)	59.2 (15.1)	61.7 (16.5)	60.2 (15.7)	55.1 (12.8)	46.9 (8.3)	37.8 (3.2)	31.1 (−0.5)	45.6 (7.6)
Mean daily minimum °F (°C)	18.2 (−7.7)	20.2 (−6.6)	24.3 (−4.3)	29.2 (−1.6)	36.2 (2.3)	43.4 (6.3)	47.4 (8.6)	46.5 (8.1)	40.8 (4.9)	32.4 (0.2)	23.7 (−4.6)	18.2 (−7.7)	31.7 (−0.2)
Mean minimum °F (°C)	−0.3 (−17.9)	−0.1 (−17.8)	4.6 (−15.2)	12.7 (−10.7)	22.4 (−5.3)	33.0 (0.6)	40.5 (4.7)	39.0 (3.9)	29.0 (−1.7)	15.6 (−9.1)	5.6 (−14.7)	−2.5 (−19.2)	−7.1 (−21.7)
Record low °F (°C)	−26 (−32)	−23 (−31)	−12 (−24)	−9 (−23)	5 (−15)	20 (−7)	30 (−1)	29 (−2)	15 (−9)	−1 (−18)	−19 (−28)	−21 (−29)	−26 (−32)
Average precipitation inches (mm)	0.96 (24)	1.46 (37)	1.92 (49)	1.91 (49)	1.88 (48)	1.79 (45)	4.68 (119)	3.87 (98)	2.26 (57)	1.63 (41)	1.30 (33)	1.28 (33)	24.94 (633)
Average snowfall inches (cm)	14.50 (36.8)	16.90 (42.9)	22.90 (58.2)	15.80 (40.1)	2.30 (5.8)	0.00 (0.00)	0.00 (0.00)	0.00 (0.00)	0.00 (0.00)	7.00 (17.8)	11.00 (27.9)	17.90 (45.5)	108.3 (275)
Source 1: NOAA
Source 2: XMACIS2 (records & monthly max/mins)
