= Al Hurricane =

American singer-songwriter of New Mexico music

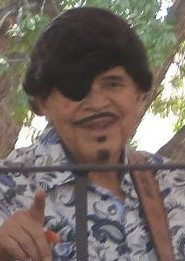
- Hurricane performing in 2014

Background information
- Born: Alberto Nelson Sanchez; July 10, 1936; Dixon, New Mexico, U.S.
- Died: October 22, 2017 (aged 81) Albuquerque, New Mexico, U.S.
- Genres: New Mexico music; corrido; country; cumbia; jazz; Latin; norteño; ranchera; rock and roll; rockabilly; Western
- Instruments: Vocals; guitar (Gibson 335, 137, 347); saxophone; piano
- Years active: 1953–2017
- Labels: Hurricane; Atlantis; Warner Bros.; Challenge; Apt; EMI; Capitol; Musart

Alberto Nelson Sanchez (July 10, 1936 – October 22, 2017), known professionally as Al Hurricane, was an American singer-songwriter, dubbed "The Godfather" of New Mexico music. He released more than thirty albums, and is best known for his contributions to New Mexico's unique style of Spanish music.

He received his nickname, Hurricane, from his mother. As a child, he would accidentally knock things over; the nickname became synonymous with his band, studio, and a recording label. His signature look, which included an eye-patch, was due to an automobile accident that occurred during the 1960s. These things, as well as his performance style, led to Hurricane being known for his ability to improvise and adapt. They have also led to his music and image being ultimately entangled with the history of New Mexico music.

During his career he also performed alongside Chuck Berry, Chubby Checker, Jimmy Clanton, Fats Domino, Marvin Gaye, along with other country music and rock and roll musicians.

== Biography ==
=== Early life and beginnings (1930s–1950s) ===
Al Hurricane was born on July 10, 1936 as Alberto Nelson Sanchez the first of five children to Jose Margarito Sanchez and Bennie L. Sanchez in Dixon, New Mexico.

The Sanchez family moved to Silver City and the father worked in the mines until he was injured. Consequently, Bennie returned to work as a clerk at a department store in a Silver City. Jose had a band, called Los Sanchez, Bennie would often join in on vocals and guitar. She eventually became a licensed practical nurse while traveling with physicians throughout Northern New Mexico. His father and mother were extremely supportive of their children. Jose, Al's father, was a miner during most of his childhood; but he still found the time to teach the five-year-old Alberto how to play the guitar. Al's mother, Bennie, made quite a name for herself, she became the president of Hurricane Enterprises. She not only promoted her musically-inclined family, but also promoted concerts for Johnny Cash, Ray Charles, Chubby Checker, Fats Domino, Little Richard and, the one she was particularly proud of, a 1972 Elvis Presley concert in Albuquerque. Her own musically talented family didn't just consist of her sons Al Hurricane, Baby Gaby and Tiny Morrie; it also consisted of Al Hurricane's sons Al Hurricane, Jr. and Jerry Dean; as well as Tiny Morrie's children Lorenzo Antonio and the members of Sparx.

During his childhood he moved to Albuquerque, where he began to play and perform in Old Town at the age of 12. He attended Old Albuquerque High, which he graduated from in 1954.

=== Al Hurricane and the Night Rockers (1950s–1960s) ===
"Lobo" by Al Hurricane & the Night Rockers
A sample of one of Al Hurricane's early instrumental songs. The track has the country/western, latin, rock and roll, rockabilly, surf rock sound that was later incorporated into his musical style.

Al became a singing waiter at the La Casita Restaurant in Old Town and, while he wasn't working, he played for tips in and around Old Town Plaza. He also began to sing and write country and rock n' roll music. During this time Al would also perform at the Sky Line Club. It was at this club, and several others, around Albuquerque and New Mexico that he built his audience. One of Al Hurricane's first single records was distributed by Warner Bros. Records it contains two tracks, titled "Lobo" & "Racer". They are both instrumental rock songs and were released in 1962 under the band name Al Hurricane & the Night Rockers with writing credits to "Albert Sanchez – Morrie Sanchez". Other single recordings by Al Hurricane from this time, recorded at Norman Petty Recording Studios include, "South Bend / Burrito" (1960 Apt Records instrumental), "Panchita / La Mula Bronca" (Challenge Records, first tracks with vocals), "Mexican Cat / Pedro's Girlfriend" (Hurricane Records instrumental), and "Rosita's Café / Only A Game (Tiny Morrie)" (Hurricane Records).

=== Recording and touring (1960s–1970s) ===
"Sentimiento"
A sample of Al Hurricane's first hit single.

A few years later, in 1967, he released his first album, titled Mi Saxophone. The two lead singles off that album were "Sentimiento" and its eponymous song "Mi Saxophone". "Sentimiento" had already been released in 1965 as a single. In 1986 Selena Quintanilla covered "Sentimientos" for her album "Alpha."These early recordings were recorded on equipment purchased from Norman Petty, that Buddy Holly recorded on. This recording equipment gave the recordings their signature 50s sound.

He began to perform outside the New Mexico music scene, performing throughout the American Southwest and Western United States including Arizona, California, Colorado, Idaho, Montana, Nevada, New Mexico, Oregon, Utah, Washington, and Wyoming; he even toured Northern Mexico in Baja California, Chihuahua, Coahuila, Durango, Mexico City, Nuevo León, Sonora, and Tamaulipas. He went on to play other American cities in other regions such as Chicago and Miami, and internationally in the cities of Asunción, Buenos Aires, and Málaga. On his way to a concert in Denver, Colorado. on November 1, 1969, he got into a car accident in which he lost his right eye. This did not deter him from pursuing his musical career; instead, it gave him a signature performing look featuring an eye-patch across his right eye.

Al recorded several albums from 1967 to 1974, these included three albums recorded around 1973; Canciones del Alma, Sigue Cantando, and Corridos Canta. These were each Spanish language releases, which continued to blend the sounds of New Mexico, the Southwestern United States'. The Latin, folk, and country/western sound was a hit each of the three communities of fans. Both Chicano and Country venues would be popular spots for Al Hurricane to play his music.

Another release at the time, Instrumentales con Al Hurricane, saw Al return to his old instrumental rock style of music.

In 1974, Al Hurricane saw two major milestones. his first full-length collaborative album with his brother Tiny Morrie; Para Las Madrecitas, the album is a tribute album to their mom, and a tribute to mothers in general. It also saw "Sentimiento", his first hit single, selling its two-hundred-and-fifty-thousandth copy.

=== "Val de la O Show" & "The Far West Club" (1970s–1980s) ===
Al Hurricane performed on a popular nationally syndicated television show called the Val De La O Show. It was a talk show and a music variety show. In his appearances he chatted with the host, and performed new hits from his recently released albums, which included material from his albums up to Vestido Mojado. The songs he played on the show also included a live performance of a Mariachi version of his hit "Sentimiento", to lip sync-style music videos of recent hits like "Vestido Mojado". The music video clips also contained some of his first video appearances performing with his son, Al Hurricane, Jr., as well as his brothers Tiny Morrie and Baby Gaby.

During the late 1960s, Al Hurricane, Tiny Morrie, and Bennie Sanchez purchased The Sky Line Club and renamed it "The Far West" in the early 1970s. From here Al performed with a band billed as Al Hurricane Band. The nightclub also became a hotspot for Country/Western and Spanish language music and dance.

In 1979, father and son, Al Hurricane and Al Hurricane, Jr. recorded their first album together called Cantan Corridos.

=== "La Prision de Santa Fe" and "Bandido" (1980s–1990s) ===
During Selena's concert in the early 1980s at The Far West, which Bennie Sanchez promoted, Selena met Al Hurricane and heard him perform his song "Sentimiento". She went on to perform a cover, called "Sentimientos", on her Alpha LP.

After the New Mexico State Penitentiary riot, in 1980, Al Hurricane wrote a song that was "strictly narrative, not a subjective account or soapbox. The song does not attempt to assign blame." The song was called "(El Corrido De) La Prison De Santa Fe" it is the lead song on an album titled, La Prision de Santa Fe.

A few of Bennie Sanchez's kids, Al Hurricane, Tiny Morrie, and Baby Gaby, got together to do a tribute album for her. It was similar in concept as Al and Morrie's previous mother related album, but it was a bit more ambitious than their previous effort. Madrecita, Te Debo Tanto also had performances by Lorenzo Antonio and Gloria Pohl, the wife of Tiny Morrie, the mother of Lorenzo Antonio.

After these two projects, Al Hurricane became the lead singer in the supergroup Bandido. The band released three albums during the 1980s. The group saw success on New Mexico radio, in Chicago, along the west coast, and internationally in Germany, Venezuela, and Spain.

The 80s also saw the release of another collaborative effort, this time it was a collaborative compilation with Morrie and Jr., entitled 15 Exitos Rancheros.

After three Bandido releases, two collaborative family LPs, and a compilation album called Exitos De Al Hurricane. Al Hurricane released his next solo album The Return of Al Hurricane "EL" Godfather.

=== "La Leyenda" and "The Godfather" (1990s–2000s) ===
He did another collaborative compilation album with Tiny Morrie and Al Hurricane, Jr. 15 Exitos Rancheros, Vol. 2 in 1994.

Once he returned to his solo albums Al Hurricane began to focus more on Ranchera music on his 1995 Sigue... "La Leyenda"!!! and mid-90s album The Legend of New Mexico. Not only did he want emphasize the Ranchera sound, he also wanted to focus on his roots in Rock and Country/Western, he re-added Chuck Berry's Johnny B. Goode and Hank Williams' Jambalaya to his live-music repertoire.

In 2000, Al Hurricane was the subject of a documentary by DJR Productions, Al Hurricane: Native Legend. The documentary focused on the life and career of Al Hurricane. It ran sixty minutes, and contained old footage and photographs of Al Hurricane throughout his life. It also contained live performances of "Sentimiento", "Johnny B. Goode", and his, then unreleased, "Siempre".

The album, Siempre, came out soon after the release of the documentary.; it continued Al Hurricane's focus on Ranchera and Western sound, while adding in a Cumbia vibe into the beat. ¡Que Viva El Godfather!, released in 2003, showed an increased enthusiasm to include an even stronger mix of Ranchera and Cumbia. Both albums contained number one hits on local New Mexico radio stations.

Al Hurricane's touring hadn't stopped, he had continued to tour nationally and internationally. In Saginaw, Michigan, both Al and Al Hurricane, Jr. drew a crowd of 8,000 fans. The Saginaw News reported "the bouncy music was something even those who don't habla Español still could savor."

=== "Tribute" and "Hey Sugar Baby!" (2000s–2010s) ===
Al Hurricane recorded his next album, Albuquerque, in 2007. The following year Isleta Casino & Showroom hosted A Tribute To Al Hurricane, the concert was recorded and released a set of two CDs and a DVD. The DVD contained small documentary-like slideshows that educate the audience to inform them on the upcoming artists and songs.

His last studio album was 2010's Hey Sugar Baby!, which had Al Hurricane combining global genres into his New Mexico sound, including Italian and Reggae music.

Several live albums were released in the 2010s, including the 2014 two volume Live At The KiMo which were recorded on February 16, 2011, at KiMo Theater. There was also the 2015 Feliz Cumpleaños! Al Hurricane the 75th Birthday Concert recorded on July 8, 2011, at the Albuquerque Hard Rock Casino.

Two compilation albums were also made, including two volumes of 15 Éxitos Cumbias, in 2015 and 2018 respectively.

== Legacy ==
Al Hurricane had eight children: Al Hurricane, Jr., Darlene Rosales, Sandra Tinlin, Jerry Sanchez, Nelson Sanchez, Erika Cavalier, Danielle Sanchez, and Lynnea Sanchez. Some of his children are musicians, Al Hurricane Jr., Jerry Dean, and Erika Sanchez. Jerry Dean's son Christian Sanchez is a musician as well.

In 2015, Hurricane gave an exclusive interview about his life to August March at Weekly Alibi. Al was known for supporting candidates based on their love for New Mexico, as opposed to political party, so he supported campaign events for both Democratic and Republican candidates. In 2017, the city of Albuquerque named the center stage of the Albuquerque Plaza after him, the city council chose to name the stage the "Al Hurricane Pavilion". During the ceremony, Republican mayor Richard Berry dedicated the stage in Al’s honor. It was also at this ceremony where Al Hurricane gave his final public performance.

He died of prostate cancer on October 22, 2017, at the age of 81. His funeral service was held on October 30, at Queen of Heaven Catholic Church in Albuquerque.

Southwestern and Western US artists, folklorists, and writers did feature stories about Al Hurricane's contributions to New Mexico music, and how he popularized the style with country, rock, and regional Mexican audiences in New Mexico. National publications like The New York Times, Los Angeles Times, Latino USA, the Smithsonian Institution, and The Recording Academy's Grammys had articles discussing the legacy Al Hurricane had on New Mexico's culture. These articles were written by writers including Gustavo Arellano, Simon Romero, and Enrique Lamadrid.

== Discography ==
=== Solo studio albums ===
- Mi Saxophone (1968)
- Canciones del Alma (1970)
- Sigue Cantando (1971)
- Corridos Canta (1972)
- Instrumentales con Al Hurricane (1973)
- Vestido Mojado (1976)
- La Prision de Santa Fe (1980)
- Exitos De Al Hurricane (1980?)
- The Return of Al Hurricane "EL" Godfather (1992)
- Sigue... "La Leyenda"!!! (1995)
- The Legend of New Mexico (1999)
- Siempre (2002)
- ¡Que Viva El Godfather! (2003)
- Albuquerque (2007)
- Hey Sugar Baby! (2010)

=== Studio albums with Tiny Morrie, Al Hurricane, Jr., Gloria Pohl, Baby Gaby, Lorenzo Antonio ===
- Para Las Madrecitas with Tiny Morrie (1974)
- Cantan Corridos with Al Hurricane Jr. (1979)
- Madrecita, Te Debo Tanto with Tiny Morrie, Al Hurricane, Jr., Gloria Pohl, Baby Gaby, and Lorenzo Antonio (1979)
- 15 Exitos Rancheros with Tiny Morrie & Al Hurricane, Jr. (1986)
- 15 Exitos Rancheros, Vol. 2 with Tiny Morrie & Al Hurricane, Jr. (1994)

=== Studio albums with Bandido ===
Under the EMI Capitol and/or Discos Musart label, in the 1980s Al Hurricane released four albums with the supergroup Bandido.

- Bandido (first release)
- Bandido (second release)
- Bandido (third release)
- 15 Exitos de Groupo Bandido

=== Live albums ===
- A Tribute To Al Hurricane - Live, Vol. 1 (2008)
- A Tribute To Al Hurricane - Live, Vol. 2 (2008)
- Live at the Kimo – Vol.1 and Vol. 2 – with Al Hurricane, Jr. (2014)
- Feliz Cumpleaños! Al Hurricane the 75th Birthday Concert (2015)

=== Documentaries with live performances ===
- Al Hurricane: Native Legend (2000)
- A Tribute To Al Hurricane (2008)

=== Compilation albums ===
- 15 Exitos Cumbias (2015)
- 15 Exitos Cumbias, Vol. 2 (2018)
