= Alfonso Clemente de Aróstegui =

Spanish bishop, writer, lawyer and diplomat

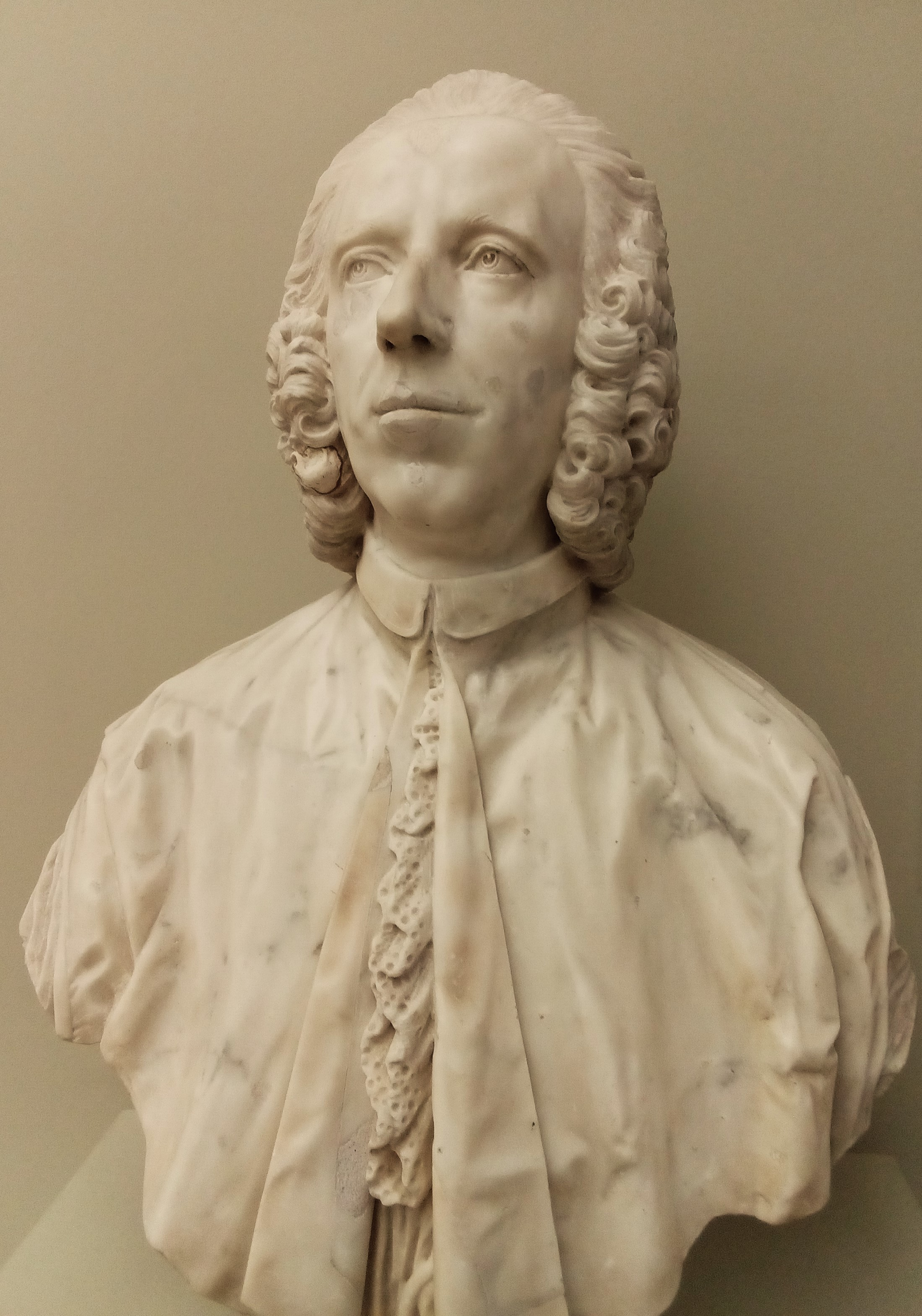
Alfonso Clemente de Aróstegui

Alfonso Clemente de Aróstegui y Cañavate (Villanueva de la Jara, 5 March 1698 - Madrid, 2 October 1774) was a Spanish bishop, writer, lawyer and diplomat.

== Biography ==
He studied at the University of Salamanca and at the University of Alcalá de Henares. He worked as a Professor for the Departments of Law and Institutions in 1731 and of Canons and Decrees in 1732 at the University Complutense and in Zaragoza's mayor's officein 1739. In 1744, he moved to Rome, where he became Oidor for Castile in the Roman Rota Tribunal. When Cardinal Acquaviva died, he was appointed interim minister plenipotentiary of Spain in Rome (1748).

In 1749, he returned to Spain and became a member of the Council of Castile and vice-protector of the Real Academia de Bellas Artes de San Fernando in 1752.
Between 1754 and 1771, he was Spanish ambassador in Naples, where he received the Order of Charles III. After his return to Spain, he became a royal commissioner of the Council and Commissariat of the Holy Crusade. He was also a member of the Chamber of Castile since 1756 and of the Spanish Council of State since 1759.

Before he died in 1774, he bequeathed all his books to the college of the Seminario de San Julián in Cuenca, also leaving two trusts to support librarians and their corresponding libraries, and two student scholarships.

== Works ==
- Concordia patoralis super iure diocesano inter episcopos et praelatos inferiores, Alcalá de Henares, 1734.
- De historia ecclesiae hispaniensis excolenda exhortatio ad hispanos Roma, 1747.
- Historia de la ciudad de Osma y de la ereccion de su obispado, escrita en latin por D. Alfonso Clemente de Arostegui, manuscript.

== Bibliography ==
- Miguel Jiménez Monteserín, Hacia Cervantes: de los libros al hombre. Univ de Castilla La Mancha, 2005.
- Didier Ozanam, Les diplomates espagnols du XVIIIe siècle: introduction et répertoire biographique [1700-1808], Madrid: Casa de Velázquez, 1998.
- José de Rezabal y Ugarte, Biblioteca de los escritores que han sido individuos de los seis colegios mayores: de San Ildefonso de la Universidad de Alcalá, de Santa Cruz de la de Valladolid, de San Bartolomé, de Cuenca, San Salvador de Oviedo, y del Arzobispado de la de Salamanca, con varios indices... Madrid: Impr. de Sancha, 1805, p. 74 y ss.
