= William Walters (outlaw) =

American outlaw (1869–1921)

- Born: 1869; Fort Sill, Indian Territory, US
- Died: June 16, 1921 (aged 51–52); Hachita, New Mexico, US
- Other names: Bronco Bill
- Occupations: Outlaw, cowboy

William E. "Bronco Bill" Walters (1869 – June 16, 1921) was an outlaw during the closing days of the Old West. He is best known for the legend of his "lost treasure", allegedly located in the area of Solomonville, Arizona.

== Biography ==
Walters was born in 1869, in Fort Sill, in Oklahoma Territory. He worked most of his youth as a cowboy, then began working for the Santa Fe Railroad as a section hand. Shortly after becoming employed by the railroad, Walters became involved in train robberies and the robberies of stagecoaches. He began riding with the Black Jack Ketchum Gang around 1893, where he is believed to have committed at least two murders. He soon coaxed some of the gang members to leave with him, and form their own gang concentrating on the robbery of Wells Fargo shipments. It would be in this endeavor that he saw his greatest success.

Between 1894 and 1897, Walters robbed an undetermined amount of cash from shipments, committing several murders in the process. The amounts he is believed to have stolen in legend are in all likelihood exaggerated. However, as the legend goes, Walters began hiding his loot in a secret location around Solomonville, near where he and his gang had their hideout. In July 1898, after a failed robbery attempt in Grants, New Mexico during which the gang was driven off by heavy gunfire by guards, lawman Jeff Milton, along with lawman George Scarborough, tracked down then shot and captured Walters, and scattered his gang from their hideout, killing another gang member in the process. George Scarborough is noted for having killed outlaw and former lawman John Selman, killer of John Wesley Hardin.

== Arrest and death ==
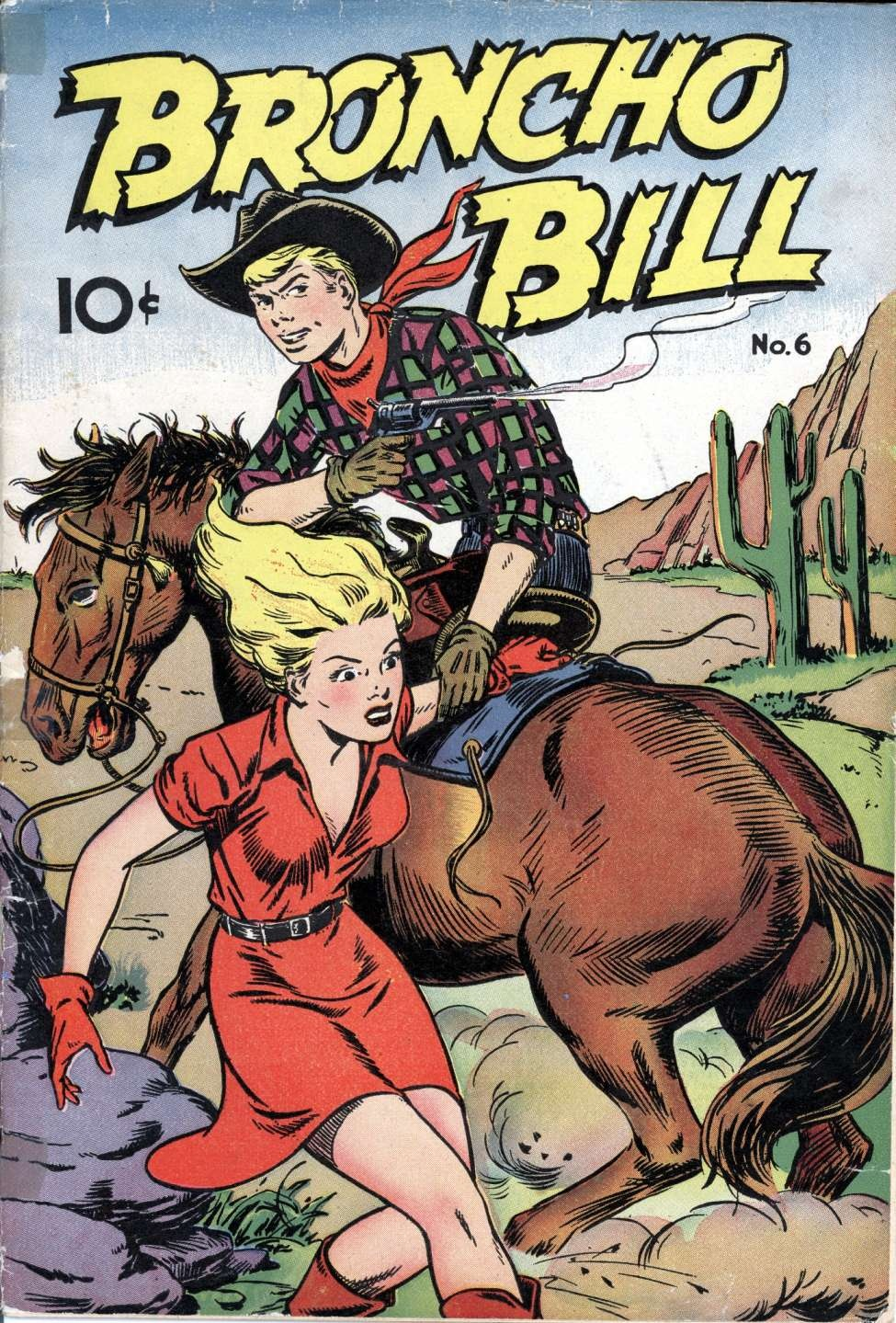
Broncho Bill #6 (April 1946), Standard Comics

Walters was convicted of his crimes, and sentenced to life in prison. Wells Fargo never recovered the stolen loot, which led to the legend. Walters was released from prison in 1917, and although it is not known for certain, he is believed to have never returned to Solomonville, possibly because there was, in reality, no "lost treasure" to recover. He settled in Hachita, New Mexico, a small ranching community, where he worked as a wrangler.

Walters died on June 16, 1921, aged 51 or 52, when he fell from a windmill while doing repairs.

The comic strip Broncho Bill by Harry O'Neill is based on Walters.
