= Antonia Apodaca =

American musician and songwriter (1923–2020)

- Born: Antonia Martinez; November 1, 1923; Rociada, New Mexico, U.S.
- Died: January 25, 2020 (aged 96)
- Occupations: Musician, songwriter
- Musical career
- Genres: New Mexico music
- Instruments: Accordion, guitar
- Years active: 1942–2020
- Member of: Trio Jalapeño

Antonia Apodaca (November 1, 1923 – January 25, 2020) was an American musician and songwriter known for her performances of traditional New Mexico music. She came to wider prominence through her performances in the La Música de los Viejitos festival in Santa Fe, the festival's nationally circulated radio broadcasts, and her appearances at the Smithsonian Folklife Festival.

== Biography ==
Apodaca was born in Rociada, a village in San Miguel County, New Mexico. Her parents, José Damacio Martinez and Rafaelita Suazo Martinez were both musicians from families of musicians. Her mother played the accordion and guitar and her father the guitar, accordion, and violin. They had a small band that entertained at local dances and weddings. Antonia taught herself to play the accordion as a child, initially on a broken one she had rescued from the trash. Her mother and uncle continued teaching her, and by the time she was a young teenager, she won an accordion contest in Santa Fe where she had competed against adults. She was also taught to play the guitar by her father. At the age of 18, she met her future husband Macario "Max" Apodaca, a fiddler from Carmen (a village near Mora, New Mexico) who had asked to join her parents' band. They married two months later and in 1949 settled in Wyoming where Max got a job in the uranium mines. They were to live in Wyoming for the next 30 years and raise their five children there. Max played with a band of German musicians in Wyoming for several years, and he and Antonia continued to perform together for both the Hispanic and Anglo communities at dances and local events. Apodaca later recalled how she and her husband had learned how to adapt the traditional Hispanic polkas and waltzes to a Western rhythm when they played for the Anglos.

In 1979 the couple returned to Rociada to live in the house where Antonia was born and had grown up. Max Apodaca died in 1987 and after his death, Antonia ceased performing. A year later, the New Mexican folk violinist Cleofes Ortiz convinced her to return and she went on to perform extensively with Bayou Seco (the folk musicians Ken Keppeler and Jeanie McLerie) and later formed her own group, Trio Jalapeño. She was awarded the New Mexico Governor's Award for Excellence in the Arts in 1992, the same year she had appeared at the Smithsonian Folklife Festival in Washington, D.C.. In December 2010, her house in Rociada burned to the ground destroying what the National Hispanic Cultural Center termed "decades of musical history and treasured instruments." She escaped with only her guitar and two accordions.

After the fire, Apodaca moved to nearby Las Vegas and has continued to perform with Trio Jalapeño. Their concerts often included her own compositions, of which one of the best known is "Estas Lindas Flores" (These Beautiful Flowers). In 2011 she was awarded the Premio Hilos Culturales, an annual award presented to folk artists from New Mexico and Colorado "who have distinguished themselves in their communities as folk musicians or folk dancers of traditional southwest styles of Canciones Del Pasado or Bailes Antiguos." Her son José Apodaca is a professional zarzuela singer and occasionally performed with his mother.

Apodaca died in January 2020 at the age of 96.

== Recordings ==
Apodaca's musical performances have been preserved on:

- Antonia Apodaca: Recuerdos di Rociada (UBIK Sound, 1991)
- Music of New Mexico: Hispanic Traditions (Smithsonian Folkways, 1992)
- Following in the tune prints with Bayou Seco: Old music in the new West (UBIK Sound, 1995)
- The American Fogies, Volume One (Rounder Records, 1996)
- La Música de los Viejitos: Hispano Folk Music of the Rio Grande Del Norte (book and accompanying CDs, University of New Mexico Press, 1999)
- Masters of New Mexico Traditional Folk Music – Hispanic and Native American, CD 1 Gallup Concert (New Mexico Arts, 2010)

She was also the subject of the television documentary, El Ranchito De Las Flores, broadcast in 1998 in the KNME-TV series Colores. Recordings of her spoken recollections are held in the University of New Mexico Oral History Projects collection 1984–1998.
