= KANW =

Public radio station in Albuquerque, New Mexico

- Albuquerque, New Mexico; United States
- Frequency: 89.1 MHz (HD Radio)

Programming
- Format: Public radio, NPR, talk and New Mexico music
- Subchannels: HD2: Public radio and talk
- Affiliations: NPR

Ownership
- Owner: Albuquerque Public Schools; (Board of Education of the City of Albuquerque, NM)

History
- First air date: October 1950
- Former call signs: KANR: KNLK (2002–2017); KANM: KLGQ (2005–2012), KDRI (2012–2017)
- Call sign meaning: Albuquerque, New Mexico

Technical information
- Licensing authority: FCC
- Facility ID: 4273
- Class: C
- ERP: 20,000 watts
- HAAT: 1,266 meters (4,154 ft)
- Transmitter coordinates: 35°12′44″N 106°26′59″W

Links
- Public license information: Public file; LMS
- Webcast: Listen live
- Website: www.kanw.com

KANW (89.1 FM) is a non-commercial radio station licensed to Albuquerque, New Mexico, United States. Owned by the Albuquerque Public Schools, KANW carries a public radio and talk format. On weekdays it airs New Mexico music and local public radio programming afternoons and nights, with NPR news programming in the morning, including Morning Edition, Fresh Air, On Point and 1A. Weekends feature New Mexico music, classical music and classic country music, as well as some NPR weekend shows such as The New Yorker Radio Hour, Wait, Wait, Don't Tell Me and The Moth Radio Hour.

A second radio service known as KANW-HD2 carries all news and information programming. It is heard on KANW's digital subchannel as well as on three FM translator stations and KANM (90.3 FM) in Grants.

KANW main channel programming is simulcast on KANR (91.9 FM) in Santa Rosa, KGGA (88.1 FM) in Gallup, KIDS (88.1 FM) in Grants, KEDP (91.1 FM) in Las Vegas, and KXNM (88.7 FM) in Encino.

== History ==
In October 1950, KANW first signed on the air. It is the oldest FM radio station in New Mexico. It was founded to air classroom educational broadcasts for students in the Albuquerque Public Schools and as a training ground for students who might be interested in broadcasting careers.

In late 2016, KANW acquired two stations from the Educational Media Foundation, a Christian radio network based in Rocklin, California. These are KANM (formerly KDRI) 90.3 in Grants and KGGA 88.1 in Gallup, New Mexico. Both stations were Air 1 outlets, which had broadcast contemporary Christian music. The acquisition gave KANW two stations in the Grants area: KIDS already had been serving as a simulcast of KANW, so KANM airs the news and talk format heard on KANW-HD2.

On February 6, 2021, KANW announced a collaboration with KEDP in Las Vegas, New Mexico. KEDP had been operated by New Mexico Highlands University since 1967. On February 9, an application was filed with the Federal Communications Commission to transfer the license of KEDP to the Albuquerque Board of Education.

On August 8, 2022, KXNM in Encino announced on their Facebook page that KANW would take over the operations of that station which served communities east of Albuquerque.

Broadcast translators for KANW
Call sign	Frequency	City of license	FID	ERP (W)	HAAT	Class	Transmitter coordinates	FCC info
KANR	91.9 FM	Santa Rosa, New Mexico	93046	100	−8 m (−26 ft)	A	34°57′20.2″N 104°40′55″W	LMS
KIDS	88.1 FM	Grants, New Mexico	93047	100	49.5 m (162 ft)	A	35°7′9″N 107°54′2″W	LMS
KANM	90.3 FM	Grants, New Mexico	83874	1,000	827 m (2,713 ft)	C2	35°15′8″N 107°35′45″W	LMS

== KANW HD2 ==
KANW broadcasts a news, information and talk format on its HD2 digital subchannel. Programming comes from NPR, Public Radio International, American Public Media and BBC World Service. This format is available in Grants on FM translator station 91.9 K220KE and in Española on 91.1 K216GQ which upgraded its signal from 44 watts horizontal to 200 watts vertical in late summer 2015. On August 1, 2016, the format was made available in Albuquerque on translator 107.5 K298BY. In early 2017 the format was picked up on KDRI 90.3 in the Grants area which also continues to air on the 91.1 translator.

Broadcast translators for KANW (HD2)
Call sign	Frequency	City of license	FID	ERP (W)	Class	FCC info
K216GQ	91.1 FM	Española, New Mexico	6049	200	D	LMS
K216AW	91.9 FM	Grants, New Mexico	4193	175	D	LMS
K298BY	107.5 FM	Albuquerque, New Mexico	8825	55 horizontal	D	LMS
