= Consuelo Luz Arostegui =

American singer

Consuelo Luz Arostegui is an American singer. She performs and records as "Consuelo Luz" is known for her Ladino and Sephardic music.

== Early life ==
Consuelo Luz Arostegui was born in Manhattan of Latin American parents and moved to Greece with them when she was a baby. She is the daughter of a Sephardic Chilean mother and a Cuban father of Basque descent. Although raised Catholic, Luz was made aware of her Jewish ancestry at an early age. Her parents were United Nations diplomats which had her growing up in many countries, including Greece, the Philippines, Spain, Italy and Peru.

== Education ==
Luz studied Spanish through the Overseas Cambridge University in Lima, Peru and later studied literature and music at the New School for Social Research in New York City. Further studies included drama at the Stella Adler Theater Studio.

== Career ==
In 1974, she moved her family to New Mexico where she met Rabbi Chavah Carp in Taos, who presented her with a collection of ancient Ladino prayers with text and music with a request that she learn them and sing them at community festivals and services. This sparked Luz's interest in Ladino music and inspired her first Sephardic CD, Dezeo, in 2000. Since then Luz has performed internationally and produced and released many more recordings and this has led her to explore more deeply her Sephardic Jewish heritage.

Her work has received positive reviews by various publications and broadcasters. Her music has been played on the national Hearts of Space Radio network and KUNM, and has been broadcast on the BBC.

== Personal life ==
Luz has two sons and a daughter. She lives in Santa Fe, New Mexico and is involved with the Ha Makom Congregation in Santa Fe, run by Rabbi Malka Drucker.

== Discography ==
- Se Fue La Nina (CD).
- Love Spirit Come (CD).
- Dezeo (CD). CD Baby. 2001.
- Yo Sé Que Yo Amo (CD). Apricot Records.
- Missing Water (CD). CD Baby. 2004.
- Adio (CD). CD Baby. 2007.

=== Compilations ===
- Consuelo Luz (2000). "Las Estreyas". A Jewish Odyssey (CD). Putumayo World Music.
- Consuelo Luz (2000). "Los Bilbilicos (The Nightingales)". In Claude Challe (ed.). Buddha Bar II (CD). Vol. 1. Wagram Records.
- Consuelo Luz (2002). "Rahamana". 10 Corso Como (CD). Ida Pingala. Vol. 1. NuN Entertainment.

=== Featured in ===
- Tulku (2002). "A Universe to Come". In David Visan (ed.). Chill Out in Paris 2 (CD). Vol. 1. George V.
- Claude Challe & friends (2003). Je Nous Aime (CD). Challo Music.
