= Al Hurricane Jr. =

American singer-songwriter (1959–2026)

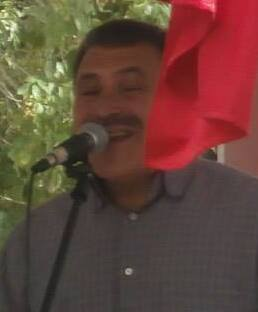
- Hurricane Jr. performing in 2014

Background information
- Born: Alberto Nelson Sanchez Jr. October 30, 1959; Albuquerque, New Mexico, U.S.
- Died: c. May 19, 2026 (aged 66)
- Genres: New Mexico music, Latin music, rock music, Norteño, Ranchera, Country Western, rock and roll, rockabilly, Corrido, Cumbia
- Instruments: Vocals, guitar (Gibson 335), piano, trumpet
- Years active: 1971–2026
- Labels: Hurricane Records, Atlantis Records, EMI Capitol, Discos Musart

Alberto Nelson Sanchez Jr. (October 30, 1959 – c. May 19, 2026), known professionally as Al Hurricane Jr., was an American singer-songwriter. He is known as "El Godson" of New Mexico music, a nickname which was inherited from his father Al Hurricane, who is considered "The Godfather" of New Mexico music. He was his father's protégé, having created numerous solo albums, and contributed songs such as "Flor de Las Flores" to New Mexico's unique style of Spanish music.

== Life and career ==
Al Hurricane Jr. was born Alberto Nelson Sanchez Jr. in Albuquerque, New Mexico, on October 30, 1959, to Alberto Nelson Sanchez and Nettie M. Fleming. He began performing music at the age of five, and performed the song Love Potion #9 during his first performance at the Albuquerque Civic Auditorium.

His death at the age of 66 was announced on May 19, 2026.
