= New Mexico music =

Genre of folk music that originated in New Mexico

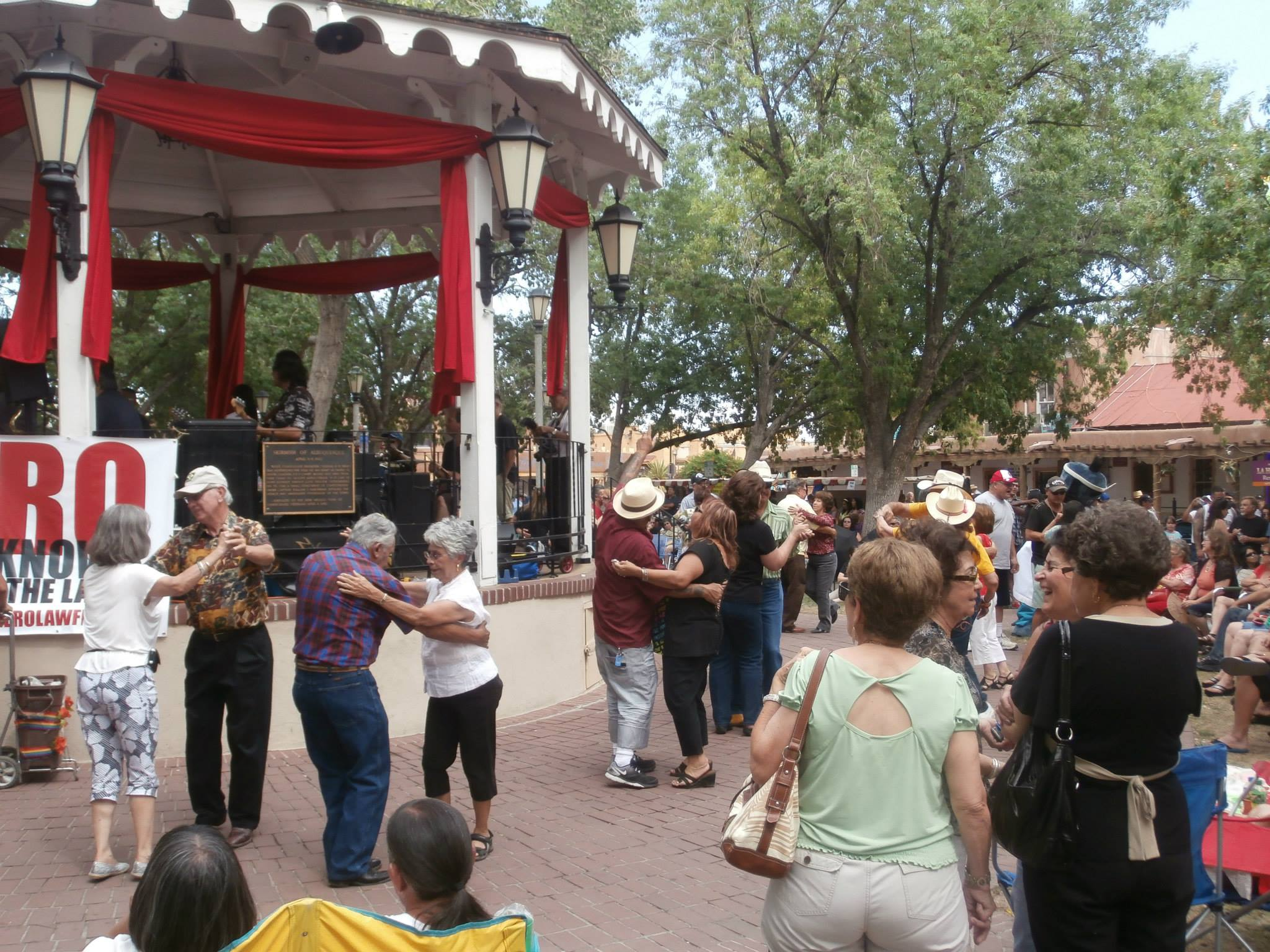
- People dancing during an Al Hurricane and Al Hurricane Jr. concert, at the San Felipe de Neri Church fiestas in Old Town Albuquerque (2014)
- Stylistic origins: Country-Western; American folk; Native American music; Navajo; Pueblo; Mexican folk; Banda; Corrido; Mariachi; Norteño; Ranchera; Jazz; Latin; Latin pop; Rock; Rock and roll; Rockabilly
- Cultural origins: 13th century: Pueblos; 16th century: Nuevo México, New Spain; 1960s: New Mexico, United States
- Typical instruments: Accordion; acoustic guitar; Anasazi flute; bajo sexto; banjo; bass; bullroarer; classical guitar; dobro; double bass; drums; electric bass; electric guitar; electric organ; fiddle; flute; güiro; guitar; harp; keyboard; mandolin; melodica; pedal steel guitar; piano; pump organ; rattles; saxophone; steel guitar; synthesizer; tarola; trumpets; vocals; whistle

Regional scenes
- Southwestern United States (esp. New Mexico)

Local scenes
- Albuquerque and Santa Fe

Other topics
- Banda music; indigenous music of North America; music of New Mexico; Regional Mexican; Tejano music; world music

The New Mexico music genre (Spanish: música nuevo mexicana / neomexicana) is a genre of music that originated in the US state of New Mexico. It derives from Pueblo music in the 13th century, and with the folk music of Hispanos during the 16th to 19th centuries in Santa Fe de Nuevo México.

During the early 1900s, the genre began to incorporate country music and American folk music. The 1950s and 1960s brought the influences of blues, jazz, rockabilly, and rock and roll into New Mexico music. During the 1970s, the music style entered popular music in the Southwestern United States.

The language of the vocals in New Mexico music is usually Mexican and New Mexican Spanish, American and New Mexican English, Spanglish, Tiwa, Hopi, Zuni, Navajo, and/or Southern Athabaskan languages.

== Origins ==
The musical history of New Mexico goes back to pre-colonial times, but the sounds that define New Mexico music begin particularly with the ancestral Puebloans. Their music survived in the traditional songs of the Pueblo people with wind instruments such as the Anasazi flute, as well as the chants and drum beats of the Navajo and Apache.

In Santa Fe de Nuevo México, the Hispanos of New Mexico brought Christian liturgical music, the violin, and the Spanish guitar, and Mexico brought with it the traditions of mariachi and ranchera.

After New Mexico became a territory, the people of the American frontier brought the traditions of country and Cajun music. This was when the first forms of New Mexico music began to be played. Western was an adaption of country and Cajun, accompanied by traditionally Mexican and Native American instruments.

New Mexico music is distinguished by its bouncy and steady rhythm, while accompanied by instruments common in Pueblo music, Western, Norteño, Apache music, country, mariachi, and Navajo music. Country and western music lend their drum and/or guitar style sections, while the steadiness of the rhythm owes its origins to the music of the Apache, Navajo, and Pueblo. And the differing rates of that tempo comes from the three common ranchera rhythm speeds, the polka at 2/4 (ranchera polkeada), the waltz at 3/4 (ranchera valseada), and/or the bolero at 4/4 (bolero ranchero).

After statehood, the music was sung at parties and in homes as traditional folk music, and New Mexico music grew in popularity with native New Mexicans, mostly with the Pueblo, Navajo, Apache, Neomexicanos, and the descendants of the American frontier. Musicians in the genre received prominent airtime on KANW, and international recognition on the syndicated Val De La O Show.

== Songs and musicians ==
Smithsonian Folkways has released traditional New Mexico music on the following albums: Spanish and Mexican Folk Music of New Mexico (1952), Spanish Folk Songs of New Mexico (1957), Music of New Mexico: Native American Traditions (1992), and Music of New Mexico: Hispanic Traditions (1992). These albums feature recordings of songs like "Himno del Pueblo de las Montañas de la Sangre de Cristo" (lit. "Hymn of the Pueblo of the Sangre de Cristo Mountains") as performed by Cleofis Vigil and "Pecos Polka" as performed by Gregorio Ruiz and Henry Ortiz, "It's Your Fault That You're Looking for Your Horses All Night" as performed by The Turtle Mountain Singers, "Entriega de Novios" as performed by Felix Ortega, "Welcome Home" by Sharon Burch, as well as other classic New Mexico folk songs. The albums also include takes on other New Mexico folk music by multiple New Mexico musicians. John Donald Robb left a significant collection of 3,000 field recordings of Nuevomexicano, Native, and cowboy music, among others, to the University of New Mexico. (Note: UNM Center for Southwest Research and the John Donald Robb collection)

Roots revival style New Mexico music, recorded by musicians like Antonia Apodaca, Fernando Celicion, Cleofes Vigil, and Cipriano Vigil, is today performed by bands like Lone Piñon.

Country music artist Michael Martin Murphey released an album titled Land of Enchantment. Tracks such as "Land of the Navajo" and "Land of Enchantment" made use of various instruments typically found in New Mexico music. Other country musicians incorporate New Mexico style music into their sound, including Billy Dawson, Daniel Solis, Josh Grider, and Shawn Brooks.

Neotraditional New Mexico music thrives due to the continued popularity of the late Al Hurricane and A. Paul Ortega, along with modern musicians Al Hurricane Jr., Robert Mirabal, Darren Cordova, Lorenzo Antonio, Sparx, Cuarenta y Cinco, Apache Spirit, Dynette Marie, and Tobias Rene. These Neotraditional musicians are regularly featured as headlining pop artists during the New Mexico State Fair. They are also sought-after performers for events such as Fiestas de Santa Fe, Fourth of July celebrations, sporting events, and Balloon Fiesta, as well as at venues such as the New Mexican casinos.

== Radio ==
- New Mexico Spanish Music is a radio program on Albuquerque-based public radio station KANW which plays traditional and modern Spanish-language New Mexico music. The show was started in 1973. Other relevant shows on KANW include Native Music Hours and Friday's Top 15 at 5:00 Countdown.
- KLVO (FM) ("Radio Lobo") is a Belen-based radio station that broadcasts New Mexico music alongside Regional Mexican music.
- KNMM broadcasts New Mexico music on Saturdays.

== Awards and recognition ==
- KANW's New Mexico Music, annual album series which has new singles from independent artists in the genre, and New Mexico Spanish Super Stars which has a mix of older and newer Spanish-language songs. The radio station has other more specific New Mexico music album compilations as well, such as vintage Oldies and Songs of the Native Land releases.
- Los 15 Grandes de Nuevo México, annual concert and album series highlighting top-charting songs in the genre. Awards are presented during the concert to the musicians.
