= Hector MacAndrew =

Scottish fiddler

Hector MacAndrew (1903–1980) was a musician, composer and Scottish fiddler during the second half of the 20th century.

He was born in 1903, in a cottage on the Fyvie Castle Estate in Aberdeenshire, where his father was head gardener and piper to Lord Leith. His father, Peter, was a good fiddler as well as a piper and Hector's brother Pat was also a prize-winning piper.

As a young MacAndrew, he received some classical training in Edinburgh, and mixed this with his awareness of the aural tradition going back to the Gows which he venerated and came to embody. Like his father, he became an estate gardener, eventually at Keithhall House, Inverurie, the residence of the Earl of Kintore. By this time (1933) he was much in demand as a player at social occasions and eventually on Radio Aberdeen. During the War he served in the Royal Artillery and was with the Eighth Army from El Alamein to Trieste when the War ended. He talked little of his wartime experiences, but it was at this time that he determined that, should he survive, he would devote himself as far as possible to keeping the tradition of Scottish fiddle playing alive.

On returning home, he began to make recordings on the Parlophone label, for the School of Scottish Studies and the BBC. His small cottage in Cults became the centre for visits from many enthusiasts of Scottish fiddling. He judged many fiddle competitions, and it was at one of these, in the City Hall in Perth, that he met Yehudi Menuhin for the first time. Menuhin was greatly impressed by his playing and his knowledge of the ins and outs of traditional Scottish fiddling and in 1974 they made a BBC television programme (Mr. Menuhin's Welcome to Blair Castle) on Scots Fiddle Music in Blair Castle, where Niel Gow, the doyen of Scots fiddlers, had played regularly 200 years before. Of MacAndrew, Menuhin wrote, "What he knew could only be learned from people with a great musical tradition, and I have a kind of reverence, almost awe, for someone who represents a tradition as exciting as that. .... ... to me, of course, he was the voice of Scotland. When I met this man and heard him play, I knew I was in the presence of Scottish history."

MacAndrew was an expert in the playing of pipe music on the fiddle. He had many friends among the piping community, men who admired his approach to "their" tunes. Of contemporary pipers he particularly admired G. S. McLennan, Angus Mackay and William Lawrie. Yet to him the strathspey was the soul of Scots fiddling. He never played for dancing, and his approach to these tunes, which was personal, led him to use whichever tempo he felt suited to a particular melody. A favourite strathspey was "Craigellachie Bridge" by William Marshall (1748-1833), and he also liked Marshall's inventive reels and the technical challenge that some of Marshall's music offered - once, when asked why he wrote music that was so difficult to play, Marshall answered (uncompromisingly) that he "did not write for bunglers"; MacAndrew enjoyed and admired this challenging music, and of all fiddle composers, it was Marshall he regarded most highly (though he also had a soft spot for Peter Milne).

MacAndrew was himself a considerable composer of fiddle tunes, and a book of his tunes, 97 of them, The MacAndrew Collection, was published in 2002. His air, "Gight Castle", is particularly haunting. He was, however, dismissive of his efforts in this field, too much so friends, colleagues and pupils believed, and his aim, he said, was never for publication; but the eventual book added a valuable addition to the library available to Scots fiddlers.

He used traditional techniques to inform his playing: the up-driven bow, 4th finger unisons, double stopping, bowed, slurred and syncopated triplets and octaves. His intonation was impeccable and his skill in varying tone quality and colour added much to everything he played, particularly the airs. He had complete technical control as demonstrated by his introduction to "Auld Robin Gray". One of his pupils, Douglas Lawrence, describes how MacAndrew played the final movement of the Mendelssohn Violin Concerto from memory sitting cross-legged on the arm of the settee in the Lawrence cottage on the Black Isle. He did not use microphones; unlike some even quite famous players, he respected the fine Pietro Guarneri violin he used, dusting excess rosin away and keeping it always in good order.

MacAndrew died on 5 April 1980, following a stroke. He was acknowledged by such as Ron Gonnella, Ian Powrie and Willie Hunter as the greatest Scots fiddler of his generation.

== Discography ==
- Scots Fiddle Scottish SR 138
- Scottish Violin Music vol. 1 1963 Waverley ZLP 2809
- --do.--Scottish Fiddle Music One-up OU 2215
- Scottish Violin Music vol. 3 Waverley ZLP 2045
