= Scottish fiddling =

Type of music

Scottish fiddling may be distinguished from other folk fiddling styles by its particular precision of execution and energy in the delivery, for example, the rendering of the dotted-quaver/semi-quaver rhythmic patterns, commonly used in the Strathspey. Christine Martin, in her Traditional Scottish Fiddling players guide, discusses the techniques of "hack bowing", "the Scotch snap", and "snap bowing". These techniques contrast quite sharply with the most common bowing patterns of Irish fiddling. The style has a very large repertoire consisting of a great variation of rhythms and key signatures. There is also a strong link to the playing of traditional Scottish bagpipes which is better known throughout the world.

== Regional styles ==
=== Shetland ===
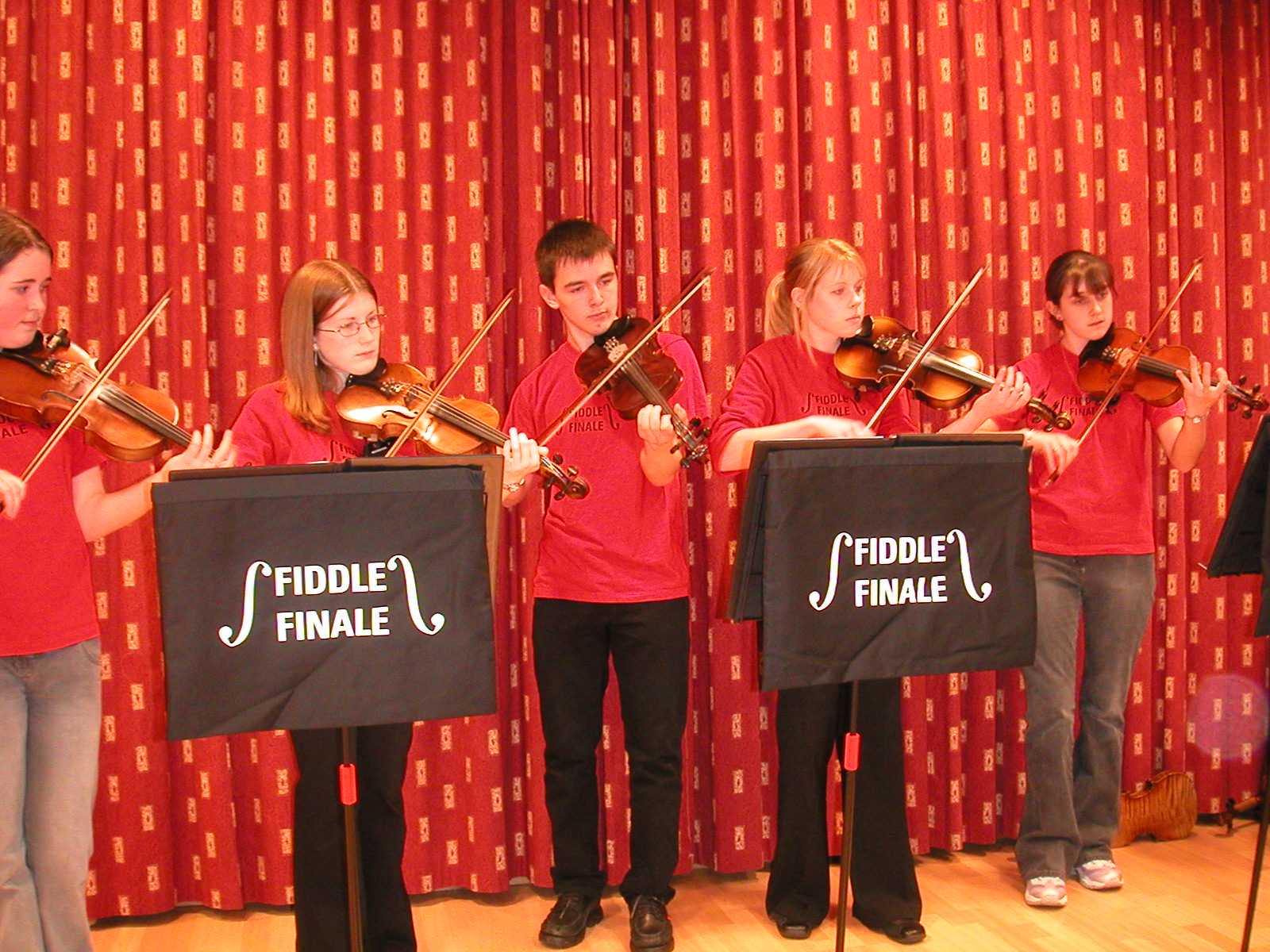
Shetland teenage fiddlers in Lerwick, 2004

The Shetland fiddling style is bouncy and lively, with Norwegian influence. It employs ringing open strings above and below the melody line. There is some Irish musical influence due to the influence of working men and seafarers (fishing and merchant). This led to stylistic cross-pollination with Shetland and Ireland; the Donegal fiddle tradition is notably more characteristically Scottish in style. This is due to the county's geographic location and rural isolation within Ireland, as well as its general Scottish influence.

==== See also ====
- Tom Anderson
- Aly Bain
- Willie Hunter
- Chris Stout
- Fiddlers' Bid
- Maggie Adamson
- Arthur Scott Robertson
- Jenna Reid
- Alasdair Fraser

=== Northeast ===
The Northeast style is elegant and classically influenced, with roots in the bothy. The original home of the strathspey, these tunes were characterized by staccato and the use of the Scotch snap, as well as the arrow stroke (also known as the driven bow).

Notable fiddlers in the Northeast style include:

- Hector MacAndrew
- Angus Fitchett
- Ron Gonnella
- Alastair Hardie
- James Scott Skinner
- Douglas Lawrence
- Paul Anderson

==== See also ====
- Niel Gow
- Nathaniel Gow
- William Marshall
- Peter Milne
- Robert Mackintosh

=== West Coast / Gaelic / Highland Style ===
The West Coast, Gaelic, and Highland styles also include the Inner and Outer Hebrides and Argyllshire. These regions place great value upon the pipe march, due to the significance of the bagpipe in their respective cultures. The Cape Breton style of fiddle music is related to these styles of music, the Cape Bretoners having come from the Highlands to Nova Scotia in the 1700s. West coast fiddlers include Angus Grant (Senior), Iain MacFarlane (Glenfinnan), Archie MacAlistair (Campbeltown), Alasdair White (Lewis), Allan Henderson (Mallaig), Eilidh Shaw (Taynuilt) and Eilidh Steel (Helensburgh). Highland fiddlers include the late Donald Riddell (d. 1992), and his former pupils Duncan Chisholm (Kirkhill), Bruce MacGregor (Inverness), Sarah-Jane Summers (Inverness), Alexander Grant of Battangorm (1856–1942), and Lauren MacColl (Fortrose).

The Highland style is particularly known for the strathspey, which is said to originate in the area of Strathspey. Sarah-Jane Summers's tuition DVD, Highland Strathspeys for Fiddle, gives an interesting insight into strathspeys as passed from Alexander Grant of Battangorm (in Strathspey) to Donald Riddell (South Clunes, near Inverness) and then to Sarah-Jane Summers (Inverness).

==== See also ====
- Angus Grant, left-handed fiddler
- West Coast Fiddle Style
- Duncan Chisholm
- Eilidh Steel
- Iain MacFarlane
- Sarah-Jane Summers
- Bruce MacGregor - founding member of Blazin' Fiddles and BBC Radio Scotland presenter
- Lauren MacColl

=== Borders ===
The fiddle music of the Borders has the most in common with English and American fiddle styles. Double-stopping, playing two strings or notes together, is commonly found in hornpipe music; such compositions are often written for two or more fiddlers.

==== See also ====
- Tom Hughes

=== Cape Breton, Nova Scotia ===
Cape Breton musicians promote their music as a style of Scottish music, though some purists argue that the location of Cape Breton in Canada should disqualify it from being given the same treatments as those of Scotland. Piano accompaniment and a dance rhythm are notable features, often complemented with step dancing. Cape Breton music has been substantially influenced by Celtic immigration to the Americas. While the Cape Breton style has differed over time from the Scottish style it has kept some of the same stylistic points, one of which is the accentuated up-driven bow.

==== See also ====
- Cape Breton fiddling
- List of Cape Breton fiddlers

== Scottish fiddling in general ==
Due to migration from rural Scotland, to industrial areas and to other countries, many players have returned again over time with certain traditions intact and some evolved through the melding of various styles. This is especially apparent in the "Central Belt" region of Scotland, where two fifths of the population reside. There is a significant influence in this area from immigration from Ireland and the rural areas of Scotland, coinciding with the rise of industry.

Notable fiddlers from Scotland today include Aly Bain, Bruce MacGregor, Johnny Cunningham, Duncan Chisholm, John Martin, John McCusker, Chris Stout, Iain MacFarlane, Charlie McKerron, Eilidh Shaw, Douglas Lawrence, Gregor Borland, Catriona MacDonald, Alasdair White, Paul Anderson, and Aidan O'Rourke.

With mass migration the tradition has been carried with the emigrants (both voluntary and forced migrations) all over the world and "Scottish Trad" is now played around the world. Key performers in the USA include Alasdair Fraser, Hanneke Cassel, Ed Pearlman, Bonnie Rideout, John Turner, Elke Baker, Melinda Crawford, Colyn Fischer, and David Gardner.

Another culturally significant style is that of County Donegal, Ireland, which is not strictly Scots but Irish. The accent on the Donegal fiddle tradition is somewhat more akin to the Scots tradition than to the Irish. The historical connection between the west coast of Scotland and Donegal is an ancient one (many shared names) as can be heard in the volume of strathspeys, schottisches, marches, and Donegal's own strong highland piping tradition. (See Donegal fiddle tradition). Like some Scottish fiddlers (which tends to use a short bow and play in a more straight-ahead fashion), some Donegal fiddlers worked at imitating the sound of the highland pipes. Scotland has influenced Donegal fiddling in various ways. Workers from Donegal would go to Scotland in the summer and bring back Scottish tunes with them; Donegal fiddlers have used Scottish tunebooks and learned from records of Scottish fiddlers like J. Scott Skinner and Mackenzie Murdoch. Fishermen from Donegal have returned from Shetland fisheries with Shetland tunes.

The Scotch snap is a very particular characteristic of much Scottish music. It is generally represented in musical notation by a sixteenth followed by a dotted eighth.

== See also ==
- Captain Simon Fraser
- Nathaniel Gow
- Niel Gow
- J. Murdoch Henderson
- Robert Mackintosh
- William Marshall
- James Oswald
- Irish Fiddle
- Donegal fiddle tradition
- Canadian fiddle
- American fiddle

== Modern day fiddlers ==
Scots fiddlers:

- Bruce MacGregor - founding member of Blazin' Fiddles and BBC Radio Scotland presenter
- Alasdair Fraser
- Aly Bain
- Allan Henderson
- Catriona MacDonald
- Chris Duncan
- Duncan Chisholm
- Iain MacFarlane
- John Turner
- Pete Clark
- Chris Stout
- Eilidh Steel
- Colyn Fischer
- Adam Sutherland, with Croft No. 5, Treacherous Orchestra and Peatbog Faeries
- Alasdair White
- Charlie McKerron
- Paul Anderson

Cape Breton fiddlers:

- Buddy MacMaster
- Natalie MacMaster
- John Campbell
- Ashley MacIsaac
- Winston (Scotty) Fitzgerald
- Dave MacIsaac

American fiddlers:

- Elke Baker
- Mari Black
- Hanneke Cassel
- Natalie Haas (cello)
- Jeremy Kittel
- Jamie Laval
- Jane MacMorran
- Ryan McKasson
- Bonnie Rideout
- Laura Risk
