= Cajun fiddle =

American folk music genre

- Stylistic origins: Ballads of the French-speaking Acadians of Canada
- Cultural origins: Late 18th century Cajuns in Louisiana; German culture
- Typical instruments: Cajun accordion, fiddle, steel guitar, guitar, triangle, harmonica, bass guitar, upright bass. In the 1930s string band era: mandolin, banjo.

Subgenres
- Black Creole

Fusion genres
- Swamp pop, Zydeco

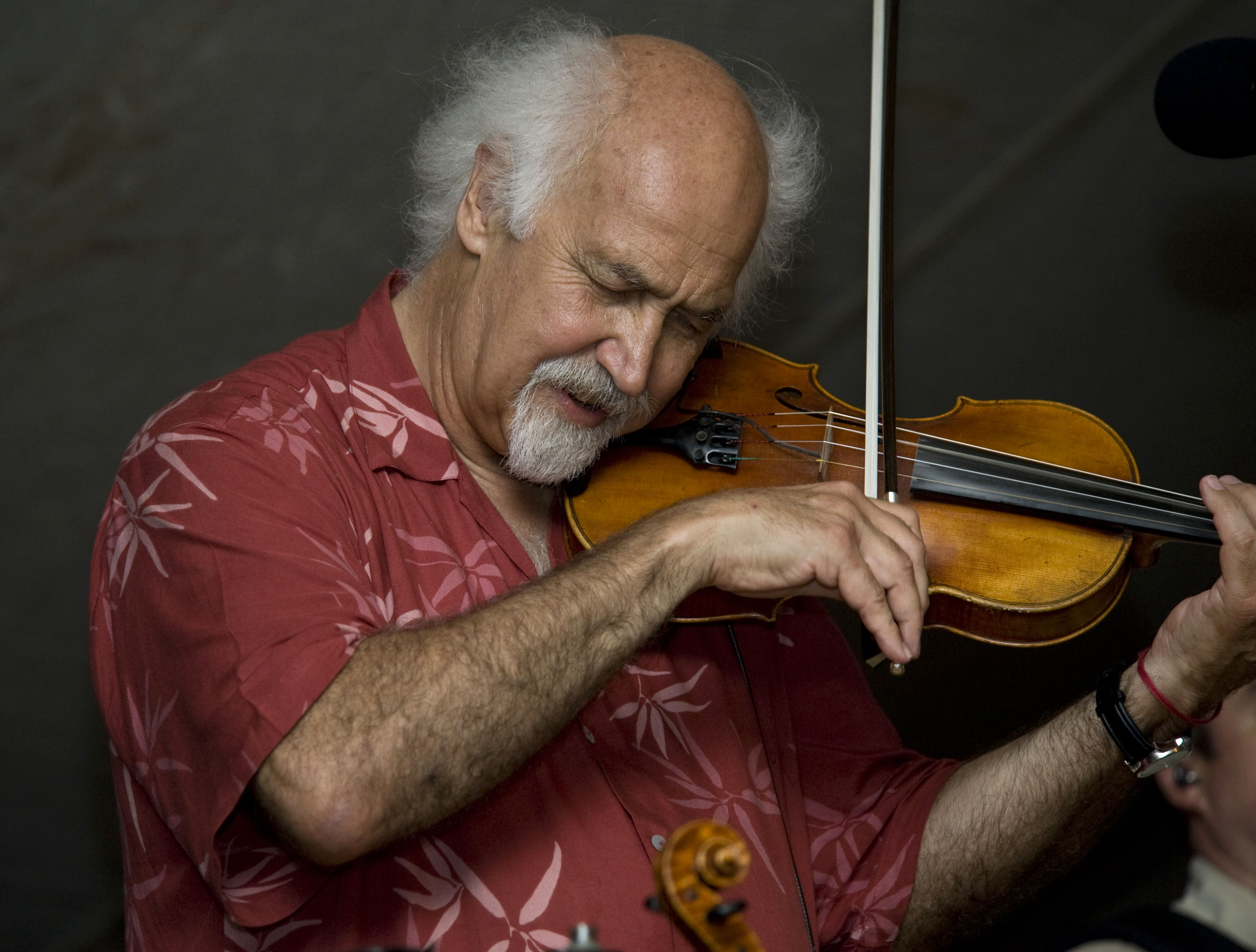
Michael Doucet

Cajun fiddle music is a part of the American fiddle music canon. It is derived from the music of southwest Louisiana and southeast Texas, as well as sharing repertoire from the Quebec and Cape Breton Island traditions. It is one of the few extant North American folk music traditions rooted in French chanson. According to Ron Yule, "Louisiana fiddling had its birth roots in Europe, with fiddling being noted as early as the 1400s in Scotland". Zydeco music is a geographically, culturally, and musically related style.

== Cajun music ==
Cajun music, an emblematic music of Louisiana, is rooted in the ballads of the French-speaking Acadians of Canada. Cajun music is often mentioned in tandem with the Creole-based, Cajun-influenced zydeco form, both of Acadiana origin. These French Louisiana sounds have influenced American popular music for many decades, especially country music, and have influenced pop culture through mass media, such as television commercials. It is an aural tradition dating past the Acadian conquest of southwest Louisiana after their displacement from Nova Scotia, whence they brought a rich musical tradition.

Blues fiddle has been directly influential in the development of Cajun fiddling, as with all music in the New Orleans music scene, and even proto-bluegrass influences from early American balladry.

== History ==
According to Bill Malone and David Sticklin, authors of Southern Music/American Music, Cajun music was first discovered commercially in the 1920s with release of Allons à Lafayette (Let's Go to Lafayette). By 1928 Cajun fiddle had already diverged into variegated styles. The most prominent proponent was Leo Soileau of Ville Platte, Louisiana, who started recording in 1928 with Mayuse Lafleur, accordionist, who "met his death from a stray bullet in a tavern brawl in October of that same year". The fiddle was the central instrument in Cajun sound until the twenties when it was somewhat eclipsed by the accordion, both in Canada and the United States. In the early 1930s strings once again dominated. Mandolins, pianos, and banjos joined fiddles to create a jazzy swing beat strongly influenced by the western swing of Texas.

== Repertoire ==
Cajun fiddle includes quadrilles, jigs, hornpipes, reels, one-steps, two-steps, airs, mazurkas, schottisches, and waltzes.

"Jambalaya" is based on a Cajun melody and has been covered by musicians of all genres, including Aldus Roger, Jo-El Sonnier and even a 1971 rock version by the young Bruce Springsteen Hank William's recording of the song is so influential it is covered in and of itself, as by Dwight Yoakam.

== Prominent proponents of the style ==
- Dewey Balfa
- Al Berard
- Breaux Brothers
- Hadley Castille
- Harry Choates
- Varise Conner
- Sady Courville
- Luderin Darbone
- Michael Doucet
- Wade Fruge
- J. B. Fuselier
- D'Jalma Garnier
- Doug Kershaw
- Gundula Krause
- L'Angélus
- Dennis McGee
- Rufus Thibodeaux

== Bibliography ==
- Malone, Bill C. (1979). Southern Music, American Music. Lexington: University Press of Kentucky. ISBN 978-0-8131-0300-6.

== See also ==
- History of Cajun music
- Cajun French Music Association
- List of festivals in Louisiana
- List of people related to Cajun music
- Cajun accordion
- American fiddle
- Canadian fiddle
- Scottish fiddling
- Irish fiddle
