= J. Murdoch Henderson =

British musician

J. Murdoch Henderson (31 March 1902 – November 1972) was a Scottish fiddler, composer, and music critic.

John Murdoch Henderson was born in New Deer, Scotland, and became a mathematics teacher in Aberdeen. A childhood accident led to him breaking both wrists and hampered his playing. He took an interest in the interpretation of fiddle music and recorded much of the information he found. He published The Flowers of Scottish Melody in 1935, which contained 130 tunes, including 40 original contributions. The collection was reprinted by The Buchan Heritage Society in 1986. Later, he edited and published The Scottish Music Maker (1957), which preserved a number of melodies by James Scott Skinner that may otherwise have been lost (Alburger, 1983).

One of Henderson's greatest influences was James F. Dickie, a renowned fiddler from Old Deer. Dickie's son-in-law, James Duncan, was the founder of the Buchan Heritage Society, and was largely responsible for the republication of The Flowers of Scottish Melody. Two of Henderson's best-known compositions are named after Dickie: the reel James F. Dickie and the strathspey James F. Dickie's Delight.
