= Canadian fiddle =

Traditional folk music of Canada on the fiddle

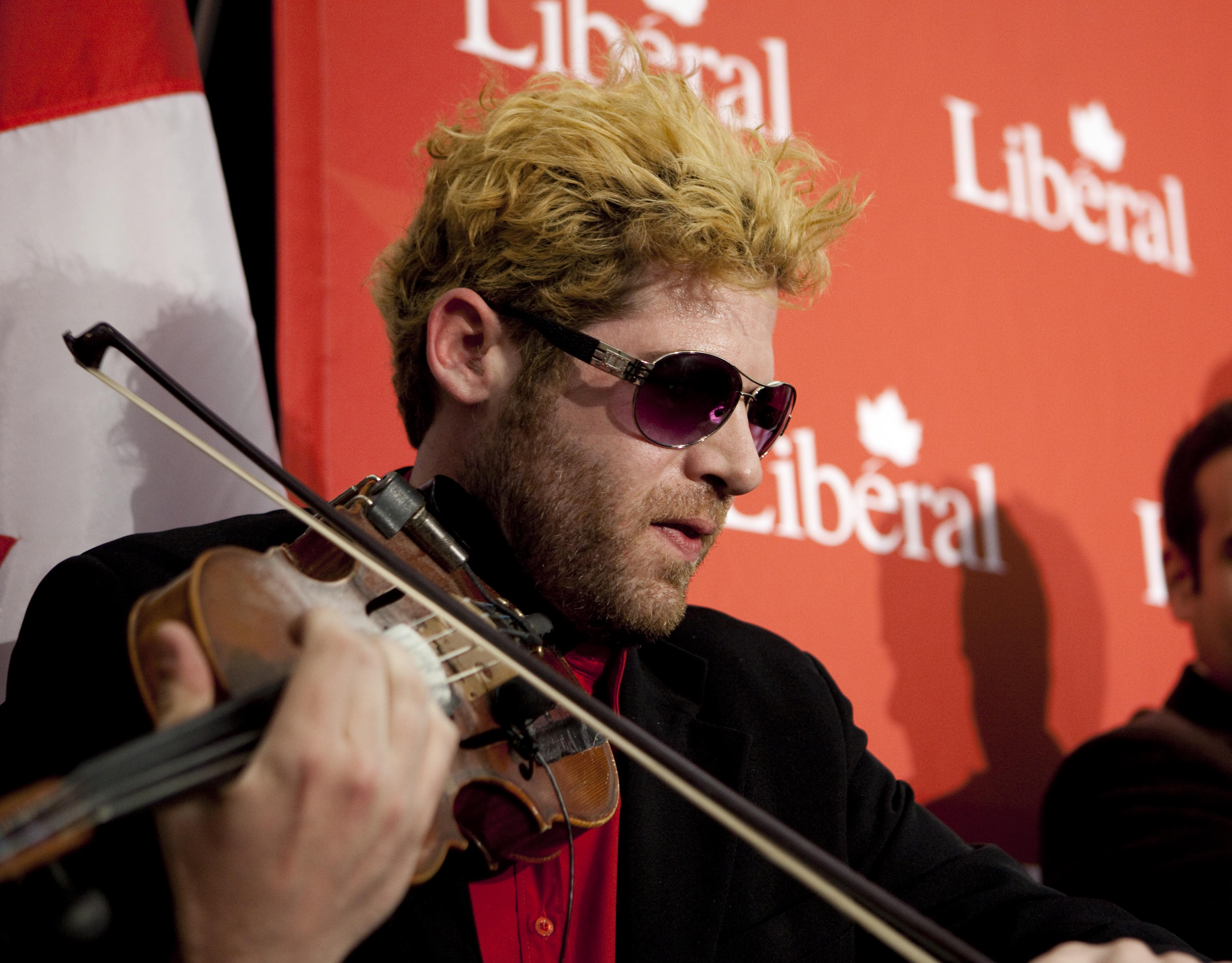
Ashley MacIsaac

Canadian fiddle is the aggregate body of tunes, styles and musicians engaging the traditional folk music of Canada on the fiddle. It is an integral extension of the Anglo-Celtic and Québécois French folk music tradition but has distinct features found only in the Western hemisphere.

== Regional styles ==
=== Cape Breton ===
Cape Breton fiddling is a regional violin style which falls within the Celtic music idiom. Cape Breton Island's fiddle music was brought to North America by Scottish immigrants during the Highland Clearances. These Scottish immigrants were primarily from Gaelic-speaking regions in the Scottish Highlands and the Outer Hebrides. Although fiddling has changed considerably since this time in Scotland, it is widely held that the tradition of Scottish fiddle music has been better preserved in Cape Breton.

Dance styles associated with the music are Cape Breton step dancing, Cape Breton square dancing (Iona style and Inverness style), and highland dancing.

Cape Breton playing is highly accented, characterized by driven up-bowing. The tunes of other music origins (Irish, Canadian, French-Canadian, etc.) sound quite different when performed by Cape Breton players. The downbeat pulse is driven by the fiddler's heel into the floor. The pattern tends to be heel-and-toe on reels, the heel on strathspeys.

Cape Breton fiddle music is influenced by the intonations of the Scots-Gaelic language, especially Puirt a Beul (mouth music) and strathspeys. The ornaments are adapted from those used on the Great Highland bagpipe. The ornamentation (cuts aka. trebles, drones and doubling) brings out the feeling of Cape Breton fiddle.

=== Down East ===
Down East, originating in the Maritimes, is one of eastern Canada's distinctive fiddle styles. The style is closely associated with prominent fiddler Don Messer and the provinces of Prince Edward Island and New Brunswick.

Fiddle music in the region originated with the arrival of the first British settlers in the 18th century. As a distinct style, Down East fiddling developed and became nationally prominent thanks to the advent of the radio. George Chappelle and the Merry Islanders hosted an early radio program on CFCY-FM on Prince Edward Island, and following Chappelle's departure in 1939, New Brunswick native Don Messer launched a show that soon became popular nationwide. Messer focused less on traditional fiddling than on producing a hit show, and his success greatly influenced local music and Canadian fiddle in general. The style developed by Messer and others came to be known as "Down East", after a colloquial name for the Maritimes. It is characterized by waltzes, jigs, polkas and reels, and its focus on simple playing and dance-ready rhythms.

== Quebec fiddle ==
Quebec fiddle is a part of the old time fiddle canon and is influential in New England and Northwest fiddle styles.

According to Reiner and Anick, the affinity between Anglo-Celtic and French fiddle music dates to the 1600s. Solo style predominated in the rugged frontier land where a small fiddle could be easily managed. Thus, cross tunings, drone notes and complex rhythms evolved to fill the gaps left in unaccompanied playing and this resulted in a highly developed style. Clogging (usually in the form of podorhythmie) was often the only available accompaniment, and much as with the aboriginal Métis fiddle style, percussive and rhythmic playing is notably developed in this style. As with the French-speaking Cajun fiddle style, German button accordion created a fad which temporarily influenced the form, as did the eventual introduction of piano in the urban center Montreal.

== Métis fiddle ==
Métis fiddle is the style with which the Métis of Canada and Métis in the northern parts of the US have developed to play the violin in folk ensemble and solo. It is marked by percussive use of the bow and percussive accompaniment such as spoon percussion. The Métis people themselves blend First Nations, French, Anglo, Celtic and others. Fiddles were "introduced in this area by Scottish and French-Canadian fur traders in the early 1800s". David Chartrand, President of the Manitoba Métis Foundation, is also interviewed in a 2006 documentary by John Barnard and emphasizes that the Métis fiddle tradition is an aural tradition which cannot be taught in schools. Métis fiddling has been analyzed by ethnomusicologist Lynn Whidden as featured in the film; she indicates that meters can vary from measure to measure and is very percussive. Players use their feet and choke up on the bow to enable a very sharp bite. Some players, such as Sierra Noble, also plays fiddle in a modernized or blended Métis style which incorporates Celtic or country-pop influences. She has been known to play Celtic rock fusion, as in the Sierra Noble Trio with Ariel Posen on guitar and Bruce Jacobs on bass. "A Note on Métis Music", Whidden emphasizes the French chanson and "Indian" derivation of the style and that they overlap and are indistinct. Métis fiddlers often accompany themselves by the use of their feet. This is also very common in the Quebec style of playing.

== Propagation ==
Much of Canadian fiddling is transmitted to new generations through oral tradition (aural tradition) at regional and national fiddler's meetups in Canada and the US. The traditional authentic means of learning to play is based upon an oral tradition as with all folk music forms but it is not uncommon for musicians to learn by listening to CD's or by reading from material such as The Fiddler's Fakebook. Aside from instruction, the traditions are maintained by Old Time Fiddler's Associations throughout North America.

== Secondary sources ==
David Reiner and Peter Anick collaborated on collecting 66 tunes for Mel Bays' Old Time Fiddling Across America which outlines several influences on what they call Northeastern Fiddling Styles: Cape Breton, French-Canadian (Québécois) and Maritime. Frank Ferrel, author of Boston Fiddle, uses the term Down East fiddle or Boston fiddle to refer to an eclectic blend of Irish, Scottish and Cape Breton (Canadian) styles.

== See also ==
- Scottish fiddling
- American fiddle
- Irish fiddle
- Cajun fiddle
- List of Canadian fiddlers
- The Rankin Family
