= Donegal fiddle tradition =

Traditional fiddle-playing method from County Donegal, Ireland

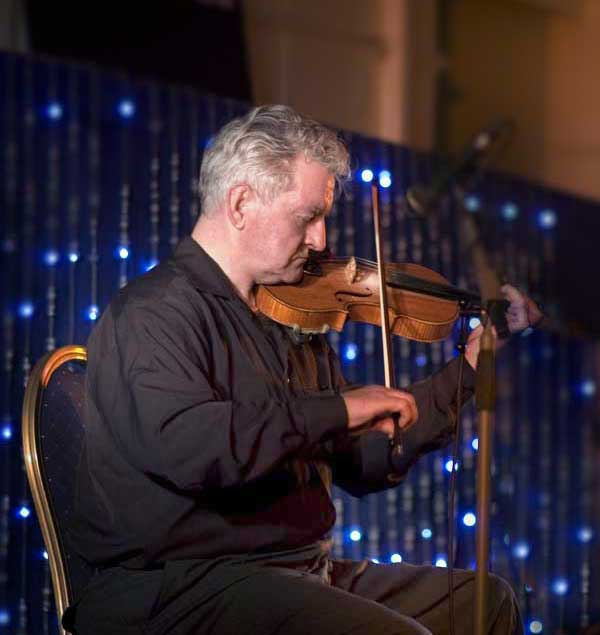
Donegal fiddler Tommy Peoples.

The Donegal fiddle tradition is one of the distinct fiddle traditions within Irish traditional music. The distinctness of the Donegal tradition developed due to the close relations between County Donegal and Scotland, and the Donegal repertoire and style has influences from Scottish fiddle music. For example, in addition to the ”universally known” standard Irish dance tunes, there is an added volume of Scottish and Nova Scotia tunes played, with even some tunes from Shetland and Orkney. This includes standard tune types such as double jigs (6/8), slip jigs (9/8), reels (4/4), and hornpipes (swung 4/4). It has been claimed that Donegal musicians play more slip jigs than any other region of Ireland. This is potentially due to the geographical borders/mountains of Ulster (especially South Ulster), which has kept County Donegal's repertoire more locally-known for decades. There is also a prevalence of mazurka playing. Mazurkas are historically mainland-European tunes very similar to a waltz, in its 3/4 meter, though generally livelier and with more emphasis being placed on the second beat of each measure. Another uniquely County Donegal tune is called the barndance, stemming from the Germanic schottische (essentially meaning ‘Scottish’), also similar to the Norwegian reinlander. The barndance is very similar to a hornpipe, but slower than a reel; typically they are played with less of a hornpipe's “swing” and more of the “drive” of a reel.

In stark contrast to other Irish musical styles, the Donegal tradition also has the Scottish 'strathspey', a traditional dance from Scotland, played a bit like a hornpipe but with emphasis on the semi-quaver; this dotted rhythm gives the strathspey its distinct “Scotch Snap” sound. While strathspeys are definitely known in Donegal (albeit played slightly slower and with less ”snap” than Scottish fiddlers), more common is the highland. Very rarely referred to as a “highland fling”, these quintessentially Donegal tunes are influenced by the Scottish strathspey, but played a bit smoother, as a sort of “strathspey-reel”. Some Scotch Snaps will be played, but highlands tend to be more akin to a slower reel, overall. Reels, themselves, are said to have originated in Scottish music. The distinctiveness of the Donegal tradition led to some conflict, between Donegal players and representatives of the mainstream tradition, when Irish traditional music was organised in the 1960s.

The tradition has several distinguishing traits compared to other fiddle traditions such as the Sliabh Luachra style of southern Ireland, most of which involves styles of bowing and the ornamentation of the music, and rhythm. Due to the frequency of double stops and the strong bowing it is often compared to the Cape Breton tradition. Another characteristic of the style is the rapid pace at which it tends to proceed. Modern players, such as the fiddle group Altan, continue to be popular due to a variety of reasons.

Among the most famous Donegal style players are John Doherty from the early twentieth century and James Byrne, Paddy Glackin, Tommy Peoples and Mairéad Ní Mhaonaigh in recent decades.

== History ==
The fiddle has ancient roots in Ireland, the first report of bowed instruments similar to the violin being in the Book of Leinster (ca. 1160). The modern violin was ubiquitous in Ireland by the early 1700s. However the first mention of the fiddle being in use in Donegal is from the blind harper Arthur O'Neill who in his 1760 memoirs described a wedding in Ardara as having "plenty of pipers and fiddlers". Donegal fiddlers participated in the development of the Irish music tradition in the 18th century during which jigs and slipjigs and later reels and hornpipes became the dominant musical forms. However, Donegal musicians, many of them being fishermen, also frequently travelled to Scotland, where they acquired tune types from the Scottish repertoire such as the Strathspey which was integrated into the Donegal tradition as "Highland" tunes. The Donegal tradition derives much of its unique character from the synthesis of Irish and Scottish stylistic features and repertoires. Aoidh notes however that while different types of art music were commonly played among the upper classes of Scottish society in the 18th century, the Donegal tradition drew exclusively from the popular types of Scottish music. Like some Scottish fiddlers (who, like Donegal fiddlers, tend to use a short bow and play in a straight-ahead fashion), some Donegal fiddlers worked at imitating the sound of the bagpipes. Workers from Donegal would bring their music to Scotland and also bring back Scottish tunes with them such music of J. Scott Skinner and Mackenzie Murdoch. Lilting, unaccompanied singing of wordless tunes, was also an important part of the Donegal musical tradition often performed by women in social settings. Describing the musical life of Arranmore Island in the late 19th century singer Róise Rua Nic Gríanna describes the most popular dances: "The Sets, the Lancers, the Maggie Pickie [i.e., Maggie Pickins] the Donkey, the Mazurka and the Barn dances". Among the travelling fiddlers of the late 19th century players such as John Mhosaí McGinley, Anthony Hilferty, the McConnells and the Dohertys are best known. As skill levels increased through apprenticeships several fiddle masters appeared such as the Cassidy's, Connie Haughey, Jimmy Lyons and Miock McShane of Teelin and Francie Dearg and Mickey Bán Byrne of Kilcar. These virtuosos played unaccompanied listening pieces in addition to the more common dance music.

The influences between Scotland and Donegal went both ways and were furthered by a wave of immigration from Donegal to Scotland in the 19th century (the regions share common names of dances), as can be heard in the volume of strathspeys, schottisches, marches, and Donegal's own strong piping tradition, has influenced and been influenced by music, and by the sounds, ornaments, and repertoire of the Píob Mhór, the traditional bagpipes of Ireland and Scotland. There are other differences between the Donegal style and the rest of Ireland. Instruments such as the tin whistle, flute, concertina and accordion were very rare in Donegal until modern times. Traditionally the píob mór and the fiddle were the only instruments used and the use of pipe or fiddle music was common in old wedding customs. Migrant workers carried their music to Scotland and also brought back a number of tunes of Scottish origin. The Donegal fiddlers may well have been the route by which Scottish tunes such as Lucy Campbell, Tarbolton Lodge (Tarbolton) and The Flagon (The Flogging Reel), that entered the Irish repertoire. These players prided themselves on their technical abilities, which included playing in higher positions (fairly uncommon among traditional Irish fiddlers), and sought out material which would demonstrate their skills.

As Irish music was consolidated and organised under the Comhaltas Ceoltóirí Éireann movement in the 1960s, both strengthened the interest in traditional music but sometimes conflicted with the Donegal tradition and its social conventions. The rigidly organised sessions of the Comhaltas reflected the traditions of Southern Ireland and Donegal fiddlers like John Doherty considered the National repertoire with its strong focus on reels to be less diverse than that of Donegal with its varied rhythms. Other old fiddlers dislike the ways comhaltas sessions were organised with a committee player, often not himself a musician, in charge. Sometimes Comhaltas representatives would even disparage the Donegal tradition, with its Scottish flavour, as being un-Irish, and prohibit them from playing local tunes with Scottish genealogies such as the "Highlands" at Comhaltas sessions. This sometimes cause antagonism between Donegal players and the main organisation of traditional music in Ireland.

Outside of the Comhaltas movement however, Donegal fiddling stood strong with Paddy Glackin of Ceoltorí Laighean and the Bothy Band and later Tommy Peoples also with the Bothy Band and Mairead Ni Mhaonaigh with Altan, who all drew attention and prestige to the Donegal tradition within folk music circles throughout Ireland.

== Description of style ==
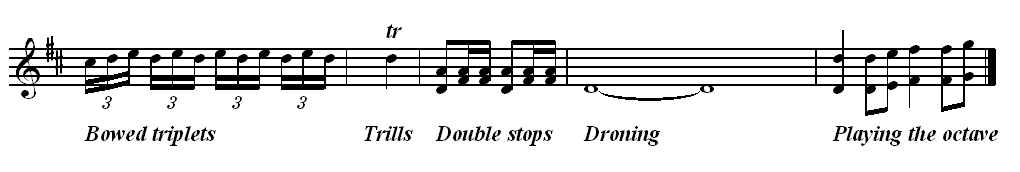
An example of the described musical styles.

The Donegal style of fiddling is a label often applied to music from this area, though one also might plausibly identify several different, but related, styles within the county. To the extent to which there is one common style in the county, it is characterised by a rapid pace; a tendency to be more un-swung in the playing of the fast dance tune types (reel and jigs); short (non-slurred), aggressive bowing, sparse ornamentation, the use of bowed triplets more often than trills as ornaments, the use of double stops and droning; and the occurrence of "playing the octave", with one player playing the melody and the other playing the melody an octave lower. None of these characteristics are universal, and there is some disagreement as to the extent to which there is a common style at all. In general, however, the style is rather aggressive.

Another feature of Donegal fiddling that makes it distinctive among Irish musical traditions is the variety of rare tune types that are played. Highlands, a type of tune in 4/4 time with some similarities to Scottish strathspeys, which are also played in Donegal, are one of the most commonly played types of tune in the county. Other tune types common solely in the county include barndances, also called "Germans," and mazurkas.

== Fiddlers of the Donegal tradition ==
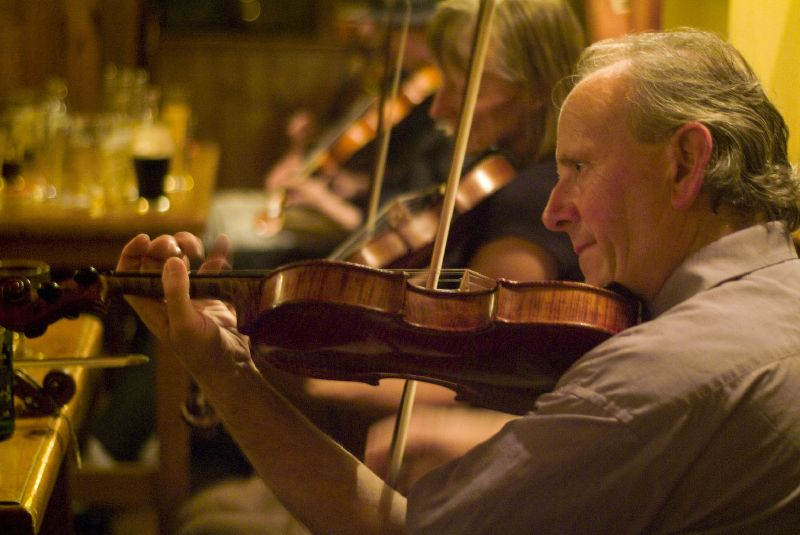
James Byrne – Glencolumbkille 2 August 2007 Photo: Rik Walton

=== Historical ===
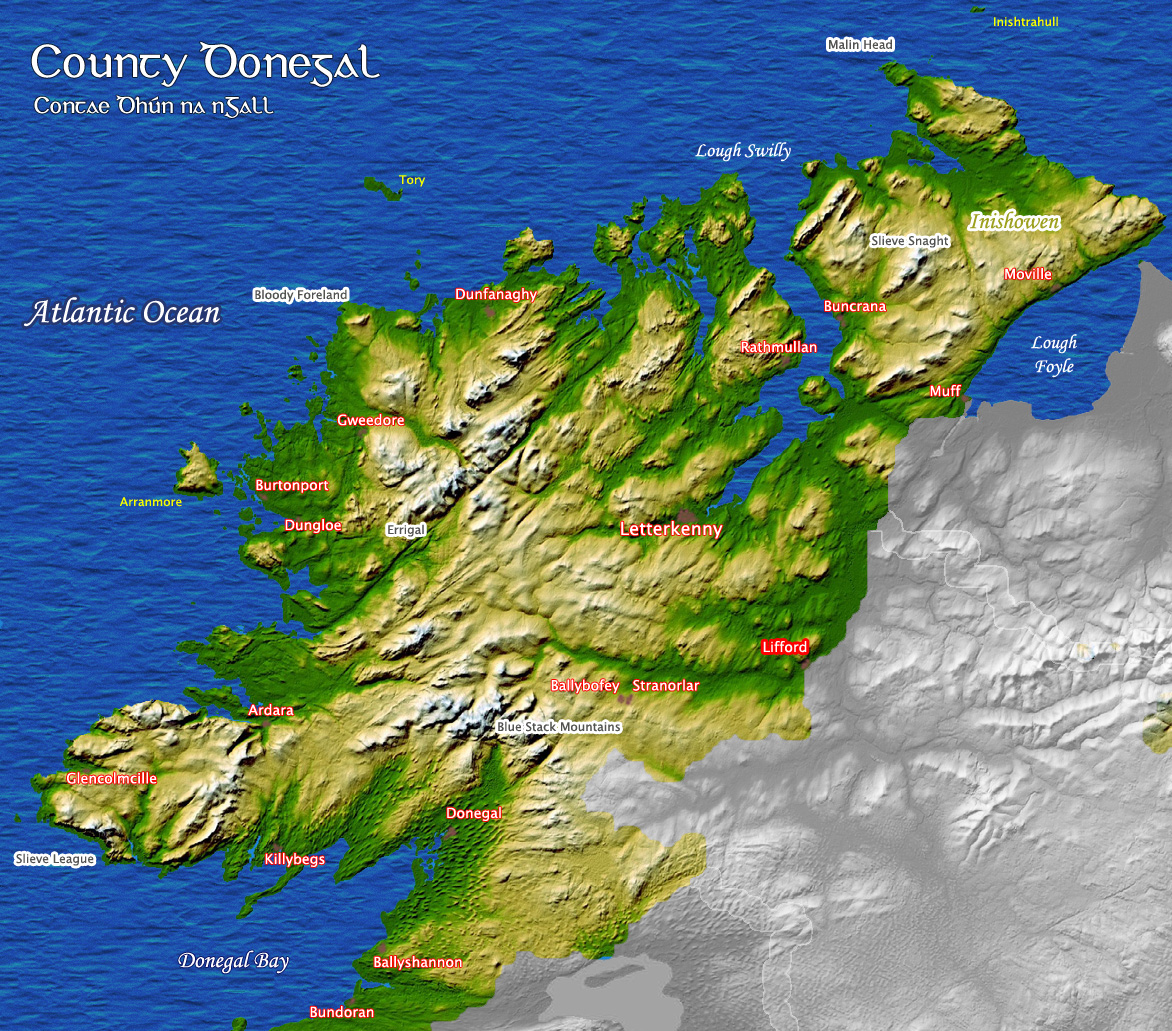
Map showing the geography and some of the different regions of Donegal.

There are a number of different strands to the history of fiddle playing in County Donegal. Perhaps the best-known and, in the last half of the twentieth century, the most influential has been that of the Doherty family. Hugh Doherty is the first known musician of this family. Born in 1790, he headed an unbroken tradition of fiddlers and pipers in the Doherty family until the death, in 1980, of perhaps the best-known Donegal fiddler, John Doherty. John, a travelling tinsmith, was known for his extremely precise and fast finger- and bow-work and vast repertoire, and is considered to be one of the greatest Irish fiddlers ever recorded. John's older brother, Mickey, was also recorded and, though Mickey was another of the great Irish fiddlers, his reputation has been overshadowed by John's.

There is no single Donegal style but several distinctive styles. These styles traditionally come from the geographical isolated regions of Donegal including Inishowen, eastern Donegal, The Rosses and Gweedore, Croaghs, Teelin, Kilcar, Glencolmcille, Ballyshannon and Bundoran. Even with improved communications and transport, these regions still have recognisably different ways of fiddle playing. Notable deceased players of the older Donegal styles include Neillidh ("Neilly") Boyle, Francie Byrne, Con Cassidy, Frank Cassidy, James Byrne (1946–2008), P.V. O'Donnell (2011), and Tommy Peoples (1948–2018). Currently living Donegal fiddlers, include, Vincent Campbell, John Gallagher, Paddy Glackin, and Danny O'Donnell.

=== Modern ===
Fiddle playing continues to be popular in Donegal. The three fiddlers of the Donegal "supergroup" Altan, Mairéad Ní Mhaonaigh, Paul O'Shaughnessy, and Ciarán Tourish, are generally admired within Donegal. An example of another fiddler-player from Donegal is Liz Doherty. Another well regarded fiddle player hailing from Donegal is Aidan O'Donnell. TG4 Young Musician of the Year 2010 Aidan O'Donnell has been described as one of the finest young Irish musicians at present. He began his music making at the age of 12, and since then has performed with some of traditional music's finest artists, including Donal Lunny, Micheal Ó'Suilleabháin and the Chieftains. In 2007, he won the prestigious ‘Oireachtas na Geailge' fiddle title, and has been a regular tutor at the Irish World Academy of Music and Dance, at the University of Limerick for the past number of years.

The fiddle, and traditional music in general, remained popular in Donegal not only because of the international coverage of certain artists but because of local pride in the music. Traditional music Seisiúns are still common place both in pubs and in houses. The Donegal fiddle music has been influenced by recorded music, but this is claimed to have had a positive impact on the tradition. Modern Donegal fiddle music is often played in concerts and recorded on albums.

== See also ==
- Irish fiddle
- Scottish fiddling
- Irish music
- Celtic music
