= Colyn Fischer =

American musician

Colyn C. Fischer (born 1977 in Pittsburgh, Pennsylvania) is an American violinist that has played the violin since the age of three and has been Scottish fiddling since the age of five. As a teenager, he studied with a number of the great fiddlers of Scotland, such as Ian Powrie and Alasdair Hardy, and of the United States, including John Turner and Bonnie Rideout. He holds a Bachelor of Music Performance in Violin from Wheaton College, Illinois, and has recorded with various ensembles in genres including jazz, classical, rock and Scottish.

In 1993, Fischer won the American National Scottish Fiddling championship (Jr. Div.), and won in the Open category in 2005 (in Houston, Texas) and again in 2006 (in Ohio).

Fischer lives in San Francisco, California, teaching at Central Middle School as the orchestra teacher. He is a private violin-fiddle instructor and also teaches at the annual Jink and Diddle School of Scottish Fiddling. He performs regularly with pianist Shauna Pickett-Gordon.

== Discography ==
- New and Traditional Tunes in the Scottish Style

Colyn Fischer – fiddle, bodhran, vocals
Joshua Carns – guitar

- The Light of Day

Colyn Fischer - fiddle
Shauna Pickett-Gordon - piano

- Nocturne

Jona Hill - violin
Jah Morant(on gang) - piano

- Sounding

Colyn Fischer - violin
Shauna Pickett-Gordon - piano
