= Robert Mackintosh =

Scottish composer and violinist

Robert Mackintosh (c 1745–1807), known as 'Red Rob' on account of the colour of his hair, was a Scottish composer and violinist, active in Edinburgh at the end of the 18th century. He was known for his compositions of strathspeys, reels, and jigs, as well as minuets and gavottes.

== Biography ==
Mackintosh was born in Tullymet, near Pitlochry, Perthshire, about 1745. Around 1773, he was living in Skinner's Close, just off Edinburgh's High Street, employed as a music teacher and playing in the orchestra of the Edinburgh Musical Society. His first collection of music was published in 1783, including 54 pieces, including 17 reels. During 1785-88 he was working in Aberdeen, leading the 'Gentleman's Concerts'. His second collection was published in Edinburgh in 1793, including 73 pieces, including more reels and strathspeys. A third collection, including 117 pieces, followed in 1796. He later went to London where in 1804 he produced his fourth collection of a further 113 pieces. He died in London in 1807.

== Works ==
- The Diamond Reel (Miss Steel of Norwich) (1st collection)
- Honourable Mrs. Campbell of Lochnell (2nd collection)
- Miss Elizabeth (Betty) Robertson (2nd collection)
- Miss Ann Munro's Quickstep (2nd collection)
- Miss Margaret Campbell (3rd collection)
- Miss Campbell of Saddell, a pastoral (3rd collection)
- Miss Robertson (3rd collection)
- Miss Mariane Oliphant (3rd collection)
- Honourable Mrs. E. Macleod (4th collection)
- Lady Charlotte Campbell's Strathspey and Reel (4th collection)
- Lady Charlotte Cadogan (4th collection)
- Miss Campbell's Reel (4th collection)

== Recordings ==
- Concerto Caledonia - Robert Mackintosh Airs, Minuets, Gavotts and Reels (2013). Pieces from MacKintosh's first collection (CD, Delphian DCD34128)
- Mackintosh at Murthly: The Music of Robert Mackintosh. Pete Clark (2004) (CD INVER225)
