= The Fiddler's Fakebook =

The Fiddler's Fakebook

The Fiddler's Fakebook, by David Brody, is a collection of fiddle tunes in lead sheet form (naturally without lyrics). It includes tunes in the following styles:

- England
- Scotland
- Ireland
- Shetland
- French Canadian
- Nova Scotia/Cape Breton
- New England
- Old-Time
- Bluegrass
- Texas Style
- Western Swing

== See also ==
- List of North American folk music traditions
