= American fiddle =

American music genre

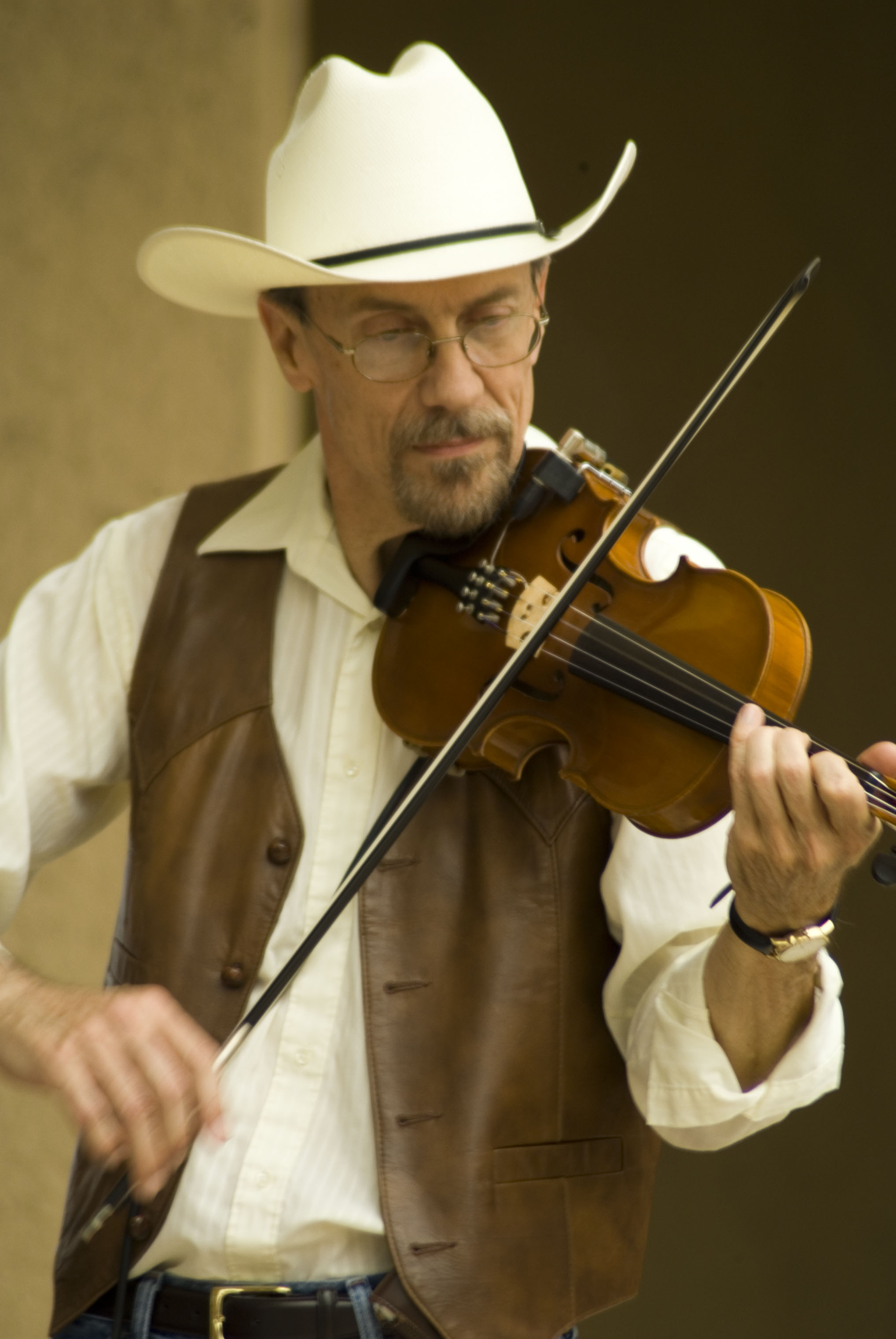
Fiddler in Wichita Riverfest

American fiddle-playing began with the early European settlers, who found that the small viol family of instruments were more portable and rugged than other instruments of the period. According to Ron Yule, "John Utie, a 1620 immigrant, settled in the North and is credited as being the first known fiddler on American soil". Early influences were Irish, Scottish, and English fiddle styles, as well as the more upper-class traditions of classical violin playing. Popular tunes included "Soldier's Joy", for which Robert Burns wrote lyrics, and other tunes such as "Flowers of Edinburgh" and "Tamlin," which have both been claimed by both Scottish and Irish lineages.

Soon these tunes developed American identities of their own; local variations developed in the Northern and Southern colonies. In contemporary American fiddle styles, the New England states are heavily influenced by all Celtic styles, including Cape Breton fiddle-playing; whereas Southern or "Dixie" fiddle styles have tended to develop their own traditions, which emphasize double stops and in some instances the incorporation of dance calls or simple lyrics.

== Fiddle playing distinguished from violin playing ==
Some folk fiddlers distinguish "fiddle" from "violin", though this is far from universal - many classical violinists refer to their "fiddle". Nevertheless, a few common differences may be observed;

=== Instrument ===
Generally, the setup of the instruments is different:

- Fiddle bridge top may be slightly flatter
- String action height may be lower
- Strings more often steel than synthetic or gut
- Fiddle more commonly set up with pickup
- Fiddle more commonly set up with four fine tuners; violinists more likely to use a single tailpiece E tuner

=== Playing technique ===
Fiddle playing generally avoids vibrato except for occasional slow tempo pieces and even then uses less vibrato. Shorter bow strokes are also consistent with the fiddle players' tendency to use less legato and more detache bow strokes. Some, but not all, styles use double stops and open tunings. Trick fiddling is employed, often built upon cross bowing technique such as used in Orange Blossom Special or Beaumont Rag.

Bowing by fiddle players is quite different in that they may intentionally grip the frog in a cruder manner and typically choke up on the bow. See for instance Rhiannon Giddens of the Carolina Chocolate Drops Massachusetts performance of Genuine Negro Jig in May 2010.

=== Fiddle repertoire distinguished ===
Fiddle players tend to play fiddle "tunes" rather than sonatas and other classical types of compositions. There are exceptions. For instance, partitas have been popular with fiddle players, particularly since publication of the Open House CD by Kevin Burke, an Irish style player based in Portland, Oregon. Fiddles are typically associated with country and other genres of popular music while violins are usually associated with classical and other genres of art music.

== Types of tunes ==
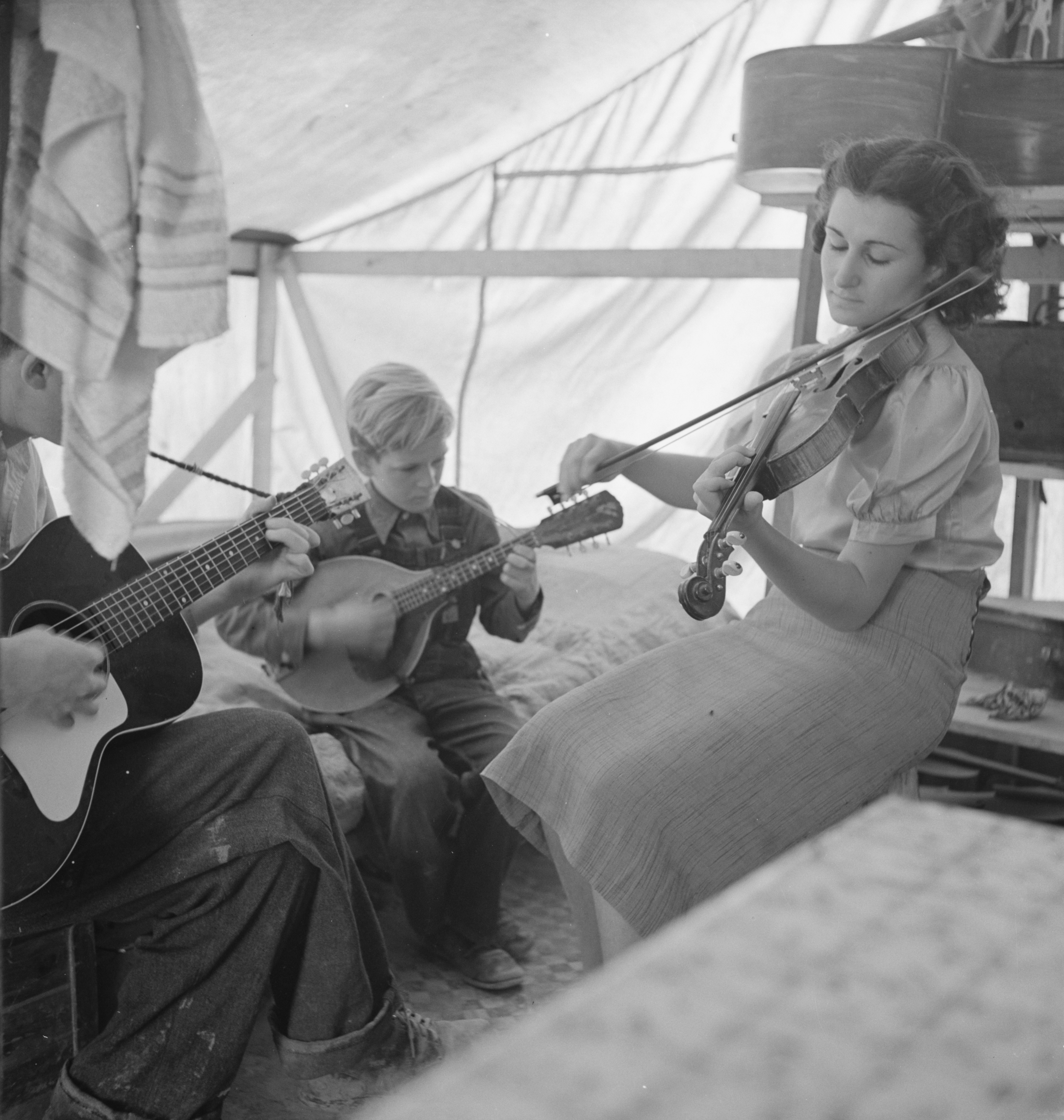
Woman playing fiddle (right) with her family in a California migrant camp, 1939

- Reels
- Hornpipes
- Polkas
- Jigs
  - Slip Jigs
  - Double Jigs
- Waltzes
- Songs with lyrics

=== Canonical Tunes ===
==== Orange Blossom Special ====
Also known as "OBS", Orange Blossom Special exploits the capacity of fiddle or violin to imitate various mechanical tones. Authorship is controversial.

==== The Devil Went Down to Georgia ====
The canonical American fiddle tune, "The Devil Went Down to Georgia" was written by Charlie Daniels as an interpretation the "Lonesome Fiddle Blues" by Vassar Clements and has been covered innumerable times. Although classified as country rock, the tune uses licks based on old-time fiddle playing and rock guitar riffs. Unlike most old-time playing, the instrument ranges high up the neck, exploiting both the legendary association of the fiddle as "the devil's instrument" and the intensity of rapid sixteenth or thirty-second notes. These effects are achieved through rapid detache bowing bordering on outright tremolo. The motif of a deal with the Devil may have been influenced by Cross Road Blues, by Delta blues singer Robert Johnson.

== Blues fiddle ==
According to London-based music writer Chris Haigh, fiddle " was among the primary instruments used by the rural blacks..." He contends that by 1930 over 50 different black blues fiddle players had recordings. Many musicians who were guitar stars also played fiddle including:

- Lonnie Johnson
- Big Bill Broonzy
- Clarence "Gatemouth" Brown

Blues fiddle uses the pentatonic blues scale to create riffs for breaks and over guitar chords typically in the standard blues progression. Vibrato is not often used, although may occasionally be used in an exaggerated manner for special effect.

== Appalachian Old time fiddle ==
Old time fiddle uses a profusion of double stops and many players typically tune their instruments in "open tunings" or cross tunings. The set ups often include flattened bridges and in some cases no chin rest. The most popular tuning is AEAE for the key of A, but the instrument can be down tuned to GDGD, which may put less tension on the neck when playing solo. ADAE is also popular for the key of D, and standard (GDAE) is often used for G. Some of the earliest popular repertoire includes "Turkey in the Straw," "Arkansas Traveler," "Billy in the Lowground." Accompanying instruments include washboard, jug bass, banjo, dulcimer, guitar, and occasionally kazoo.

According to some sources, old time music is actually the "early recorded country music of the 1920s and 1930s, particularly of the southeastern states" thus narrowing the definition considerably. Nevertheless, a broader definition usually prevails which incorporates unrecorded music with roots long before radio transmission and sound recording were invented. Within old time music there are regional subgenres, such as the Deep South and Appalachia, where fiddle music is often intertwined with cultural phenomena such as coal mining.

A comprehensive review of old time fiddle styles was written by David Reiner and Peter Anick and published in 1989.

== Bluegrass fiddle ==
Bluegrass music originated with Bill Monroe. According to Haigh, "Monroe always considered the fiddle to be the key instrument of bluegrass". Key fiddlers in bluegrass include:

- Chubby Wise - Played with Monroe. Also a Texas Swing player.
- Kenny Baker - Originally a swing fiddler, Baker played with Monroe from 1957 to 1984, the longest tenure of any band member. He is considered one of the most influential bluegrass fiddlers, and is famous for his smooth, "long-bow" style.
- Byron Berline - a bluegrass player, has appeared with the Rolling Stones, Gram Parsons and The Flying Burrito Brothers.
- Richard Greene - Played with Monroe. Classical training, also played old time.

== Cajun fiddle ==
According to Ron Yule, "Louisiana fiddling had its birth roots in Europe, with fiddling being noted as early as the 15th century in Scotland." The most widely known Cajun fiddler is Doug Kershaw. Zydeco music is closely related.

== Rock fiddle ==
Rock fiddle, like rock music in general, owes much to American blues. Incorporation of fiddle or violin into rock, as with jazz, has been a slow process, resisted by some critics as an"unlikeliest and perverse misuse of an instrument". Rock has roots in folk music particularly the American folk revival of the 1960s, and thus as a matter of usage some writers refer to "rock fiddle" when discussing playing by classically trained musicians who join rock bands and thus import classical style rather than fiddle style into their playing.

- Papa John Creach (Jefferson Airplane, Jefferson Starship, Hot Tuna) - played in a style more closely approaching fiddling as opposed to classical style.
- Sugar Cane Harris - played with John Mayall & the Bluesbreakers, John Lee Hooker, Little Richard and Johnny Otis.
- Jerry Goodman - with Mahavishnu Orchestra's album Birds of Fire.
- Scarlet Rivera - played with Bob Dylan on "Hurricane".
- David LaFlamme (born Gary Posie) - It's A Beautiful Day, also performed with Jerry Garcia, Janis Joplin, and Dan Hicks.

Rock violinists often use solid body electric violins to reduce feedback. Rock is an international phenomenon and is consequently influenced by cross fertilizations from rock players such as Ashley MacIsaac Nevertheless, American rockers continue to experiment. For instance, eclectic rocker Natalie Stovall, a graduate of Berkelee Conservatory, covers Led Zeppelin, AC/DC, Michael Jackson, Lenny Kravitz, The White Stripes, Lynyrd Skynyrd, Jimi Hendrix, all the while alternating between standard rock vocals and fiddle/violin riffs.

Other rock fiddle or violin players include

- Byron Berline - a bluegrass player, has appeared with The Rolling Stones, Gram Parsons and The Flying Burrito Brothers
- Rufus Thibodeaux (Neil Young)
- John Cale of The Velvet Underground notable tracks include "Heroin"

== American jazz fiddle ==
Jazz playing on the fiddle is often called jazz violin but there are some instances in which "jazz fiddle" is discussed. For instance Mel Bay contributor Martin Norgard presents jazz fiddle in numerous media (book, website). Nevertheless, instructional jazz playing was preceded by the highly influential 1992 Oak Publications volume Jazz Violin" by Matt Glaser and Stephane Grapelli. The topic is indeed covered on the Wikipedia online encyclopedia at the article page entitled Jazz violin. Australian jazz player Ian Cooper is presented as a violinist. Dutch eclectic player Tim Kliphuis presents his jazz instructional material as "Jazz Swing Violin Fiddle" but his website quotes the Glasgow Herald review which denominates hims as a "splendid young...violinist".

== Texas swing ==
This music, usually considered to be synonymous with Western swing, is bona fide fiddle music and is deeply intertwined with country and folk music as played by Willie Nelson, Merle Haggard, Vince Gill, Dale Watson, the Wheel's Jason Roberts, Jesse Dayton, and Garrison Keillor. A well-known example of this music is "Faded Love", which despite some controversy is generally attributed to Bob Wills. Mark O'Connor is a Texas swing fiddle performer who also plays bluegrass and jazz, but got started as a youth contender in fiddle contests.

== New England, "Down East," Yankee, or Boston fiddle ==
One of the most prominent examples of the New England fiddle tradition was Maine's Mellie Dunham, who was a sensation in his day. Today New England fiddle playing is exemplified by Rounder Records artist Frank Ferrel. He refers to the style as "Down East" in his volume Boston Fiddle. Unlike other fiddle traditions, piano accompaniment is common, and, he notes occasionally saxophone or clarinet would join in. Another feature is frequent use of minor keys particularly G minor and also the "flat keys" of F Major and B flat Major, which are not typically used in Old Time and other indigenous music traditions. Ferrell traces his roots into the 1800s Boston Scottish and Irish cultures as typified in musicians such as William Bradbury Ryan. Like all Celtic American fiddle traditions, his is influenced by the publication of Chief O'Neil's massive directory of fiddle tunes in 1903 Thus, Ferrel and others in the North East tradition use the full panoply of Irish fiddle ornamentation.

- Bowed Triple
- The Cut
- The Double Cut
- The Long Roll
- The Short Roll
- The Slide

Other influences include Scottish fiddling and Cape Breton style, which has its own blend of Celtic traditions which include also Normandy styles.

== Canadian and other international influence ==
American fiddle traditions are deeply influenced by international influence from numerous immigrations and ordinary commerce particularly from Anglo-Celtic and Canadian sources. Québécois French, Cape Breton, Nova Scotia. Folk music tradition but has distinct features found only in the Western hemisphere This influence is largely due to immigration and cross-border commerce. Some observers categorize Maritime influence as a cosmopolitan trend of its own blending otherwise distinct styles which outlines several influences on what they call Northeastern Fiddling Styles: Cape Breton, French-Canadian (Québécois) and Maritime.

== Scottish style American fiddlers ==
- Brittany Haas
- Hanneke Cassel
- Jeremy Kittel
- Bonnie Rideout
- Laura Risk

== See also ==
- Fiddle
- Banjo
- Appalachian dulcimer
- John Lomax, musicologist
- Mark O'Connor, a major influence
- List of fiddlers
- Canadian fiddle
- Cajun fiddle
- Scottish fiddling
- Irish fiddle
