= Peter Milne (musician) =

Scottish violinist and composer

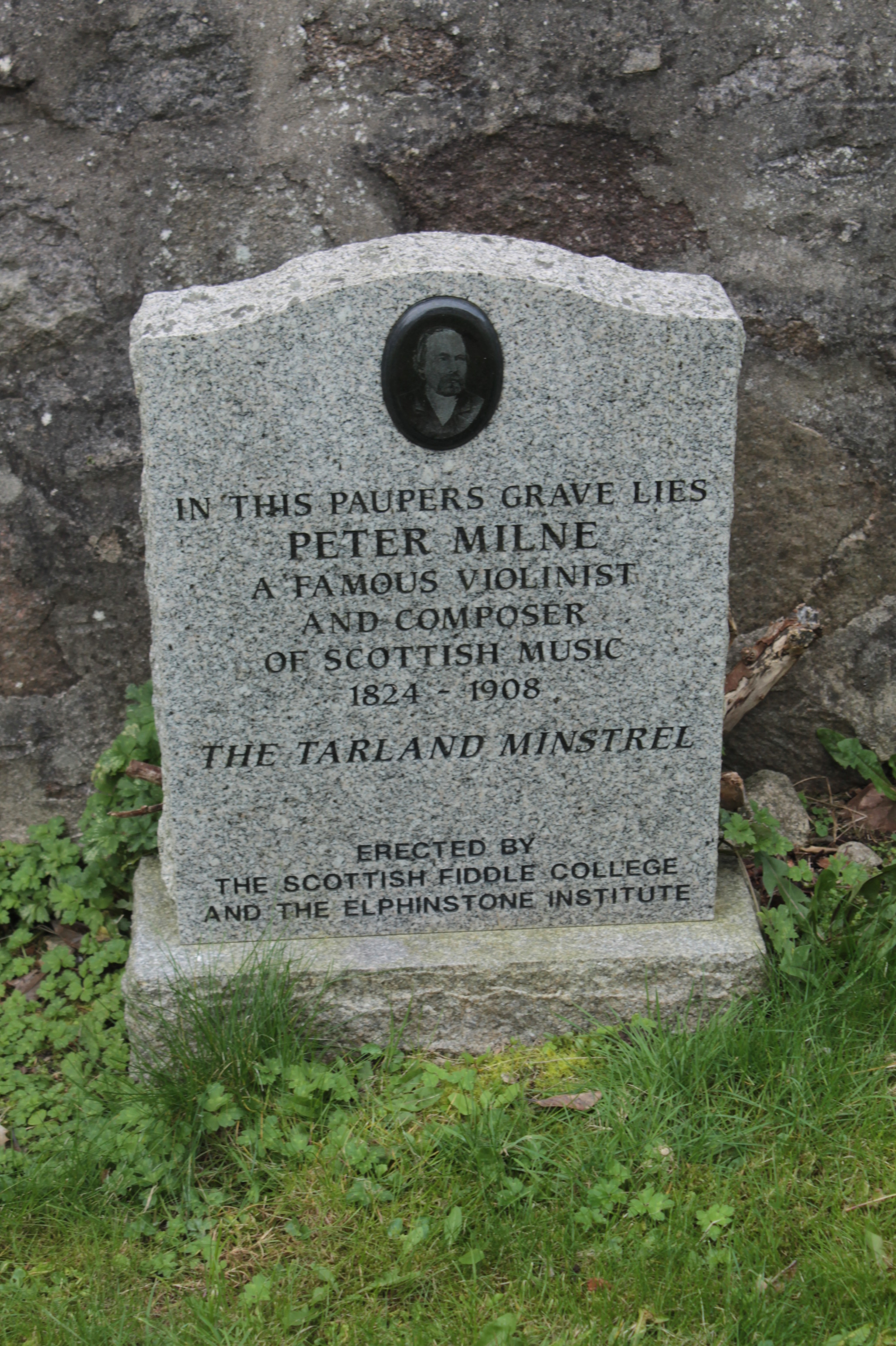
The grave of Peter Milne, Nellfield Cemetery

Peter Milne (30 September 1824 – 11 March 1908) was a Scottish violinist and composer. He was known as the "Tarland Minstrel".

== Life ==
He was born in Kincardine O'Neil and taught himself the fiddle in his early teens. He became famous as a player of reels and strathspeys.

He was buried in a pauper's grave in Nellfield Cemetery in Aberdeen in 1908. The Scottish Fiddle College erected a stone to his memory.

== Recognition ==
Milne was mentor to James Scott Skinner who wrote a Strathspey entitled "Peter Milne".
