= Arthur Scott Robertson =

Scottish fiddle player

Arthur Scott Robertson (15 February 1911 – 6 February 2000) was a fiddle player from Shetland. He was recognized as "Scotland's Champion Fiddler".

== Life ==
Born in Bressay and raised in Nesting, he was first introduced to the instrument by his neighbor Willie Hunter Snr. (Willie Hunter Jnr.'s father). He was first taught to play the instrument by Gideon Stove, and later on stopped playing traditional Shetland music, but proceeded with a more north-eastern Scottish style. In 1969, the first Scottish Fiddle Championship took place. Competing against 115 other fiddlers, he won and was titled "Scotland's Champion Fiddler". Throughout the 1980s and 1990s, he taught many pupils, teaching the more Scottish style of music, and not the Shetland style. His son, Neil Scott Robertson was involved in many of his compositions as a pianist. Arthur Robertson died on 6 February 2000.

== Music ==
Robertson composed over 300 tunes, most of them published in five volumes. The best known tunes are Helen N. Robertson (his wife) and Laxoburn.
