= James Byrne (musician) =

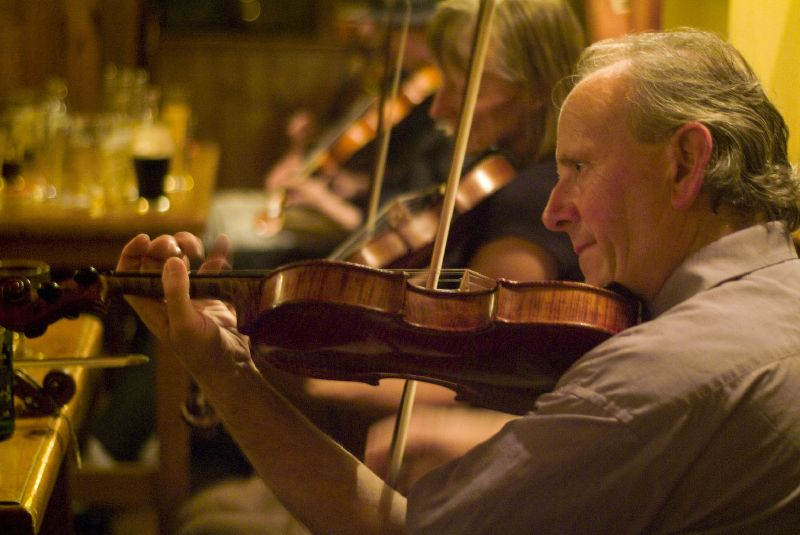
- James Byrne – Glencolumbkille 2 August 2007

Background information
- Born: 4 January 1946; Gleann Cholm Cille, County Donegal, Ireland
- Died: 8 November 2008 (aged 62) Gleann Cholm Cille, County Donegal, Ireland
- Genres: Traditional Irish music Folk
- Occupations: Musician, songwriter
- Instrument: Fiddle
- Years active: 1965–2008
- Label: Claddagh Records

James Byrne (/bɜːrn/; Irish: An Beirneach; 4 January 1946 – 8 November 2008) was an Irish farmer and fiddle player from County Donegal. He has been called one of Ireland's leading fiddle players.

== Biography ==
Byrne was born in Mín na Croise (Meenacross), Gleann Cholm Cille (Glencolmcille) in south west County Donegal, Ireland. He learned his first tune from his father at the age of 8.

His style is the old Glencolmcille, County Donegal, style. He was the link between the older generation of musicians in his area – including his neighbours, the Dohertys, the Cassidys, the McConnells – and the young generation of Donegal fiddlers today whom he taught.

By 1980, many of the older local musicians had died, and Donegal music was being played only in isolated pubs. Claddagh Records, a Dublin-based music label, recorded The Brass Fiddle: Traditional Fiddle Music From Donegal, featuring Byrne. He followed this with a solo album, The Road to Glenlough (a lake near his home in Mín na Croise), in 1990. A young band from Donegal, Altan, started playing a number of his tunes and became popular internationally.

Byrne's reputation increased nationally and internationally when adult students of the Irish language and Irish traditional music met him while attending language and music classes at the adult language college Oideas Gael.

On a number of occasions he took part in Ceol sa Ghleann, an arts project hosted in Glencolmcille which includes the annual Féile Ealaíon Traidsiúnta Ghleann Cholm Cille. This is a week-long annual music festival held around Easter. They also run annual Donegal Fiddle school 'Scoil Samhraidh James Byrne' every July in his memory.

Byrne was interviewed by BBC Northern Ireland on an educational programme about the connection between Donegal and Scottish fiddle music. He was also interviewed by Michael Robinson for Fiddler Magazine on the Donegal fiddle tradition.

In later years, he began his own summer fiddle school, and performed regularly with his partner, Connie Drost, and their daughters.

James Byrne died on his way home from a session in the early hours of 8 November 2008 near his home in Mín na Croise. His funeral was attended by a number of notable Irish musicians, including All-Ireland singing champion, Rita Gallagher, Dermot Byrne of Altan, Tommy Peoples and Joe Burke.

== Discography ==
- The Brass Fiddle: Traditional Fiddle Music From Donegal Featured: Various fiddlers, including James Byrne, Vincent Campbell, Con Cassidy and Francie Byrne.
- The Road to Glenlough (1990)
- The Beirneach (2018)
