= Willie Hunter (musician) =

Willie Hunter (1933–1994) was a Scottish folk fiddler born in Shetland who played an important part in the rejuvenation of the Shetland fiddling traditions. He began playing at age four, and was taught by Gideon Stove of Lerwick and Geoffrey di Mercado, who provided classical violin training. Hunter played with the Hamefarers Dance Band, the Yell Band, and the Cullivoe Band. His last album, Willie's Last Session, was recorded just eleven days before his death from cancer on 27 January 1994.

A collection of Hunter's tunes was published in 1998 by his widow, Pat. Among his best-known compositions are the slow air Leaving Lerwick Harbour, the reel The Cape Breton Visit To Shetland, and the strathspey Willie Hunter's Compliments to Dan R. MacDonald.

== Discography ==
- Willie Hunter (1982)
- Leaving Lerwick Harbour (with Violet Tulloch, 1994)
- The Willie Hunter Sessions (with Violet Tulloch, 1997)
- Willie's Last Session (with The Cullivoe Band, 1999)
