= William Marshall (Scottish composer) =

Scottish composer (1748–1833)

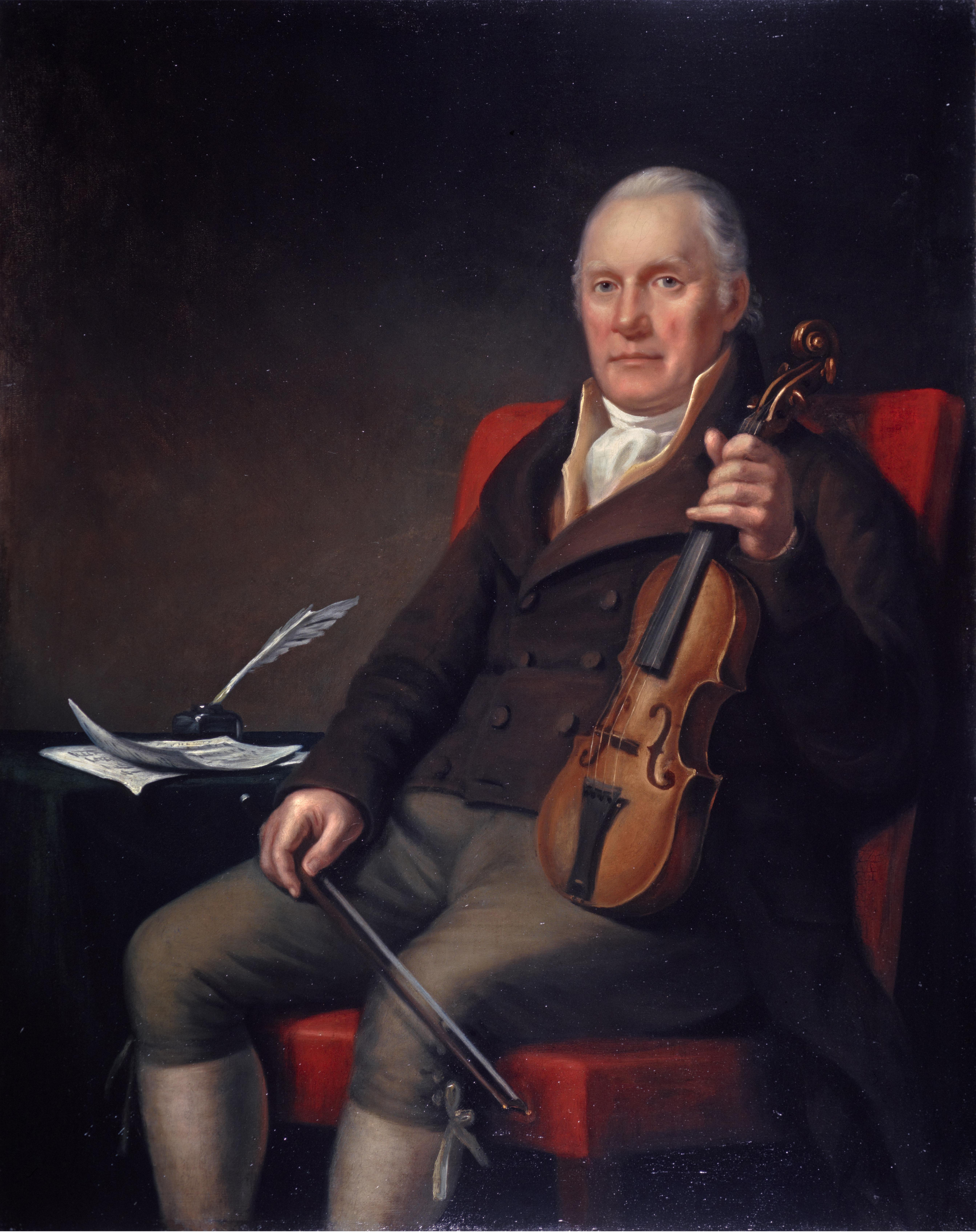
William Marshall (1817) by John Moir (1775–1857)

William Marshall (27 December 1748 – 29 May 1833) is regarded as one of the greatest composers of Scottish fiddle music of the Classical period.

Marshall was born in Fochabers, Scotland. He entered the service of the Duke of Gordon, eventually becoming the factor to the Gordon Estate. James Hunter's The Fiddle Music of Scotland credits Marshall with writing 257 tunes. Many of these compositions were named in honour of the Duke's guests. Robert Burns called him "the first composer of Strathspeys of the age". He was also a clock maker, he built both a water clock and an astronomical clock and both are still in existence today. Marshall died at Dandaleith on 29 May 1833 and was buried in Bellie Parish churchyard near Fochabers.

Some of Marshall's best-known compositions are the strathspeys The Marchioness of Huntly, The Marquis of Huntly's Farewell, Craigellachie Brig (named after the Craigellachie Bridge), and Lady Madelina Sinclair; the air The Nameless Lassie; and the reel Easter Elchies. Marshall published two collections of his work, A Collection of Strathspey Reels with a Bass for the Violoncello or Harpsichord in 1781, and Marshall's Scottish Airs, Melodies, Strathspeys, Reels, &c. for the Piano Forte, Harp, Violin & Violoncello in 1822. A third collection, Volume 2nd of a Collection of Scottish Melodies Reels Strathspeys Jigs Slow Airs &c. for the Piano Forte, Violin and Violoncello was published posthumously in 1845. At present, his compositions are available in William Marshall's Scottish Melodies, published by Fiddlecase Books.

== See also ==
- Scottish Baroque music
