= Irish fiddle =

Music style

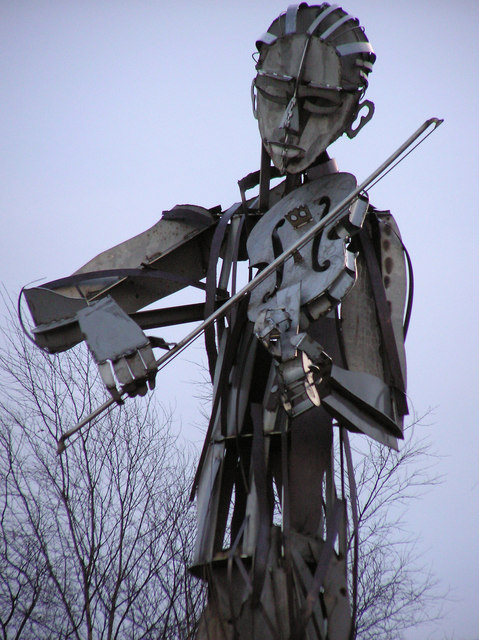
The Fiddler, Strabane

The fiddle is one of the most important instruments in the traditional repertoire of Irish traditional music. The fiddle itself is identical to the violin, however it is played differently in widely varying regional styles. In the era of sound recording some regional styles have been transmitted more widely while others have become more uncommon.

== Contemporary performers ==
Modern performers include: Liz Carroll (All-Ireland Junior and Senior Fiddle Champion); John Carty; Brian Conway; Matt Cranitch; Desi Donnelly; Martin Fay; Frankie Gavin; Cathal Hayden; Kevin Burke; Martin Hayes; Eileen Ivers (9-time All-Ireland Fiddle Champion); Seán Keane (fiddler); Mairéad Ní Mhaonaigh; Maurice Lennon; Andy McGann; Sean McGuire; Dónal O'Connor; Brendan Mulvihill; Gerry O'Connor; Caoimhín Ó Raghallaigh; Tommy Peoples; Bridget Regan; Marie Reilly; Paul Shaughnessy; Sean Smyth; John Sheahan; Fergal Scahill.

Sligo fiddlers like James Morrison and Michael Coleman did much to popularise Irish music in the United States in the 1920s. More recently Michael Gorman was also a huge influence. Donegal fiddler John Doherty came from a large family of fiddlers. He travelled all over Ireland, developing an encyclopedic knowledge of fiddle tunes. He was one of the last of the travelling fiddlers. He had a large body of knowledge of Scottish (especially marches and highlands) music as well.

== History ==
In 1674 Richard Head wrote in reference to Ireland, ‘On Sundays: In every field a fiddle, and the girls footing until they foam up’. suggesting the modern fiddle was already present in Ireland. Reference to the Irish fiddle can also be found in John Dunton's Teague Land: or A Merry Ramble to the Wild Irish (1698) he says “on Sundays and Holydays, all the people resorted with the piper and fiddler to the village green" Thomas Dineley visited Ireland in 1680 he says in regards to music "with piper, harper, or fidler, revell and dance the night throughout" There's a 17th century reference to children in Cork being taught the Irish fiddle When the fiddle was being mass-produced in Ireland, as opposed to more local makers, starting in Dublin, with the likes of Thomas Perry (luthier), Thomas Molineux (luthier) and John Neal they heavily based their craft on the English violin makers and most were imported into Dublin from England An instrument was excavated during the 18th century in Dublin that was dated from the 11th century, it was made of dogwood with an animal carved on its tip, it was believed to have been the oldest bow in the world, however it's unclear what instrument the bow belonged to. There may also be a reference to the Irish fiddle in the Book of Leinster (ca. 1160)

== Style ==
Compared to classical violin, Irish fiddler tend to make little use of vibrato except for slow airs, and even then it is used relatively sparingly. Like the rest of Irish traditional music tradition, melodies are embellished through forms of ornamentation, such as rolls, trebles, and cuts.

Irish fiddlers also use a vocabulary of bow slurs different from other fiddle traditions, at least in proportion of usage. Most notably, fiddlers often slur into the beat to produce a certain lilt, not unlike the Newcastle hornpipe style of bowing in England and Scotland, though the technique in Ireland is not restricted to hornpipes. They may also slur over beats in such a pattern as to create a natural back-beat in reels.

Slow airs are occasionally played upon the fiddle, but the style is best known for fast, snappy reels and jigs. Strathspeys, popular in Scottish Fiddle are seldom played, as such, but there are some tunes which amply utilized dotted rhythm. Some tunes are:

- The Wind That Shakes The Barley
- The Humours Of Lissadell
- The Maid Behind The Bar

== Regional styles ==
Examples include the Sliabh Luachra and Donegal fiddle traditions.

In Irish fiddling there are few known composers, as many tunes have been taught by ear and passed down from one generation to another. Also, many players adjusted tunes to suit their style and taste, so there can be many variations for a particular tune.

== See also ==
- Folk music of Ireland
- Donegal fiddle
- Scottish fiddle
- Canadian fiddle
- American fiddle
- Category:Irish fiddlers

== Bibliographic resources ==
- Vallely, Fintan (1999). The Companion to Irish Traditional Music. Cork University Press. p. 2. ISBN 0-8147-8802-5
- F. H. A. Aalen et al. (1997-07-19), Atlas of the Irish Rural Landscape (Hardcover), University of Toronto, ISBN 978-0-8020-4294-1
- a b Fintan Vallely (1999). The Companion to Irish Traditional Music. New York University Press. ISBN 0-8147-8802-5.
- a b Between the Jigs and the Reels: The Donegal Fiddle Tradition C Mac Aoidh - 1994 - Drumlin Publications
- Donegal and Shetland Fiddle Music D McLaughlin, Irish Traditional Music Society - 1992 - Irish Traditional Music Society, University College, Cork
- a b c Changing cultural landscapes: the co-existence of musical genres in Irish culture and education. M McCarthy - Irish Studies Review, 2004 - Taylor & Francis
- a b c McCarthy, M. (2004). Changing cultural landscapes: the co-existence of musical genres in Irish culture and education. Irish Studies Review. p. 134
- a b Michael Robinson. "The Fiddle Music of Donegal". The Standing Stones.
- Ken Perlman. "Sean McGuire: Master of The Irish Violin". The Irish Fiddle.
- a b c MacAoidh, C. (1994). Between the Jigs and the Reels: The Donegal Fiddle Tradition. Drumlin Publications. p. 125
- Tim McCarrick. "Famous Fiddlers, General Knowledge and Where to Get It Part Three". Mel Bay Publications, Inc.
- "Johnny Doherty". Rambling House. 2007-12-17.
- McLaughlin, D. (1992). Donegal and Shetland Fiddle Music. Irish Traditional Music Society. p. 58
- Larry Sanger. "The Donegal Fiddle Tradition". EFX Studio. Retrieved 2008-03-08.
- Feldman, Allen, and Eamonn O'Doherty. The Northern Fiddler: Music and Musicians of Donegal and Tyrone. Belfast: Blackstaff Press, 1979.
- Dromey, Paul. "Doctor Liz has many strings to her bow". The Living Tradition. No. 36. Archived from the original on 2008-03-21.
- "Nuacht Vol. 8 No.4". County Donegal.
- Foy, Barry (March 1999). Field Guide to the Irish Music Session (Hardcover). Roberts Rinehart Publishers. p. 89. ISBN 978-1-57098-241-5
- "The Donegal Fiddle". Irish Music Review.
- "Summer 2006". Fiddler Magazine. Archived from the original on June 15,
