= Crooked tune =

A crooked tune is a musical piece, generally in the American, Canadian, or Irish tradition, which deviates for the standard number of beats for that style of tune (reel, hornpipe, polka). That is, the tune may add or drop notes, disrupting the usual rhythm.

Banjo player Tony Trischka described crooked tunes as: Things aren't all foursquare. They're quirky around the edges. Just the way players of yore felt it. Instinctively correct rather than technically correct.
