= Ian Powrie =

Ian Powrie (26 May 1923 - 5 October 2011) was a Scottish country dance musician and fiddle player best known for his performances on the BBC show the White Heather Club.

== Early life ==
Ian Powrie was born at Bridge of Cally (56.648°N 3.403°W near Blairgowrie), Perthshire. At the age of five, he began playing the violin and had performed on Children's Hour on BBC radio at the age of twelve. His father, Will Powrie, took up a farm at Bridge of Cally where Ian worked as a ploughman. Will Powrie was also a well known country dance musician (playing the melodian) and Ian played in his band.

== Wartime service ==
Powrie served as a pilot in the RAF during World War II. In 1946 he went back to work on his father's farm.

== Music career ==
Powrie did not immediately take up a career as a professional, playing only at dances at weekends, but by 1949 had reformed his father's band. In that same year he made his first recording. His brother Bill played button accordion and his sister Mary played piano. His mainstream recording career began with the Beltona label, on 21 May 1951, in Glasgow. After a further session with Beltona in October, 1953, he transferred to the Parlophone label. Perhaps one of his most well-loved discs followed. This recording was produced by George Martin, Bothy Ballads for the Gay Gordons and was recorded in Dundee on 27 July 1957 (label number R 4386). In 1960 Powrie and his band turned fully professional and worked with Andy Stewart on the White Heather Club. However, he continued to own a farm where he worked as a hobby.

Powrie toured Australia and New Zealand with Andy Stewart in the 1960s. He emigrated to Australia with his wife Leila and children in 1966 where he successfully continued his music career. The family returned to Scotland between 1984 and 1999 but then again emigrated to Australia.

While in Scotland in 1994, a violin belonging to Powrie, made by the famous 18th century Scottish violin maker Matthew Hardie, was destroyed when a lorry rear-ended Powrie's car at Bridge of Cally. The tune The Matthew Hardie by Bert Murray is a reference to this violin.

== Death ==
Powrie died on 5 October 2011 in Perth, Australia.
