= Lombard rhythm =

Musical rhythm, especially used in Baroque music

One measure of the "Scotch snap" or Lombard rhythm notated in sheet music in a 4/4 time signature.

The Lombard rhythm or Scotch snap is a syncopated musical rhythm in which a short, accented note is followed by a longer one. This reverses the pattern normally associated with dotted notes or notes inégales, in which the longer value precedes the shorter.

In Baroque music, a Lombard rhythm consists of a stressed sixteenth note, or semiquaver, followed by a dotted eighth note, or dotted quaver. Baroque composers often implemented these rhythms. For instance, Johann Georg Pisendel utilized Lombard rhythms within the largo and allegro sections of his sonata for Violin Solo in A Minor. Carl Philipp Emanuel Bach included dotted rhythms within certain excerpts of his concerto for flute, cello, and keyboard. Not only did Baroque performers and composers such as Johann Joachim Quantz, introduce these uneven rhythms in their studies and pedagogy, but jazz also possesses these rhythms which are in the very essence of its style.

In Scottish country dances, the Scotch snap (or Scots snap) is a prominent feature of the strathspey.

Due to the immigration of Scots to Appalachia, elements of Scottish music such as the Lombard rhythm have been appropriated into popular music forms of the 20th and 21st century. In modern North American pop and rap music, the Lombard rhythm is very common; recent releases by Post Malone, Cardi B, and Ariana Grande feature the Scotch snap. Grande's song ‘7 Rings’ was the subject of controversy surrounding this rhythm, wherein several hip-hop artists (Princess Nokia and Soulja Boy) who had used the rhythm in an iconic fashion raised accusations of plagiarism.
