= Fiddle =

Bowed string instrument

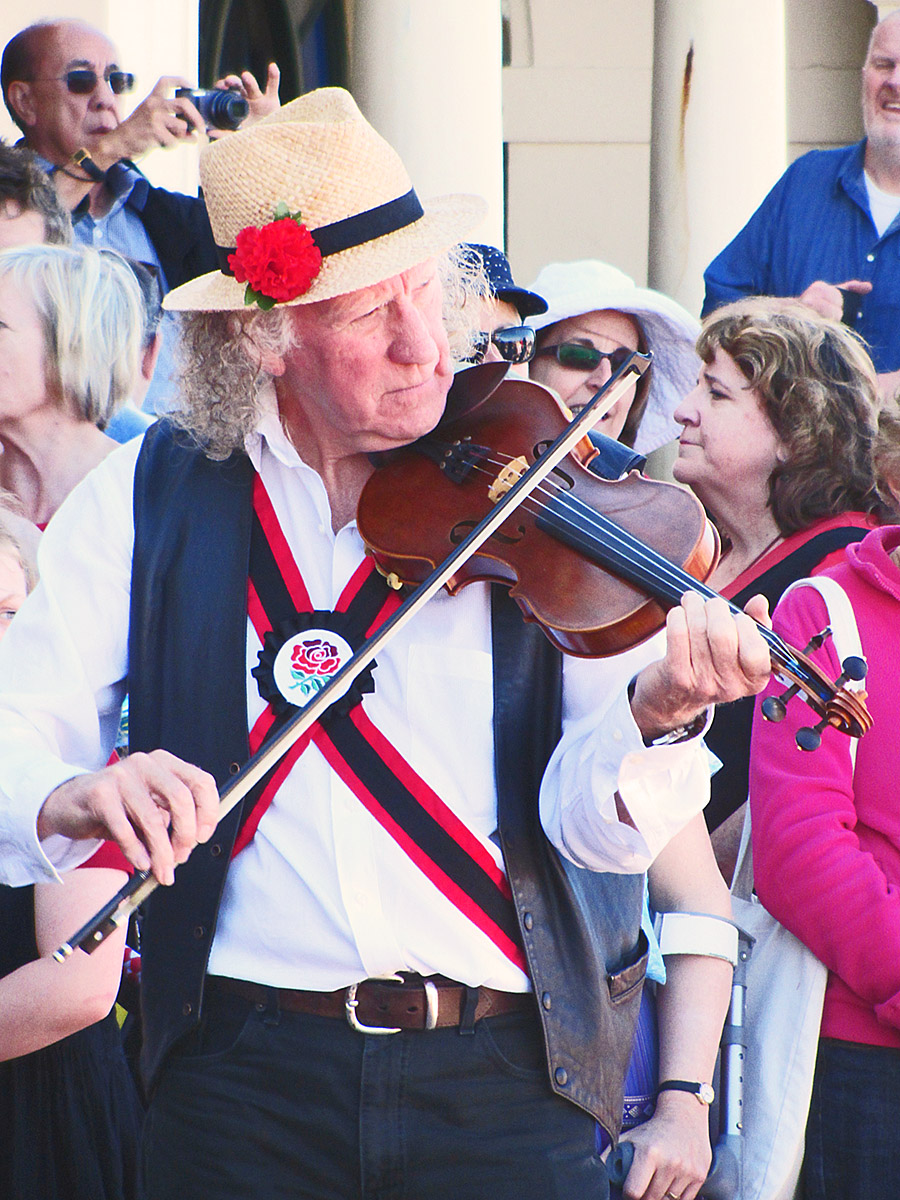
- A morris dance fiddler playing a fiddle.

String instrument
- Other names: Violin
- Classification: Bowed string instrument
- Hornbostel–Sachs classification: 321.322-71
- Developed: Early 16th century

Playing range
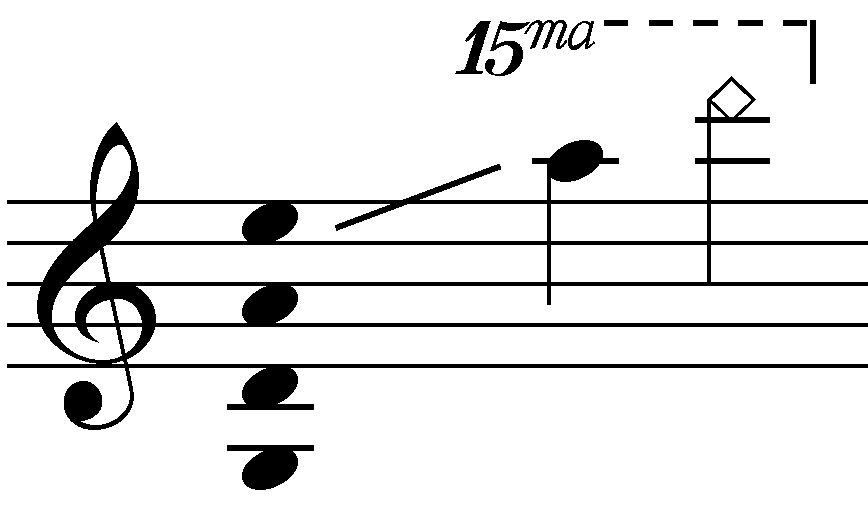

Related instruments
- Violin family (viola, cello); Viol family (includes double bass)

Musicians
- List of fiddlers

Builders
- Luthiers

A fiddle is a bowed string musical instrument, most often a violin or a double bass. Fiddle is a colloquial term for the violin, used by players in all genres, including classical music. Although in many cases violin and fiddle are essentially synonymous, the style of the music played may determine specific construction differences between fiddles and classical violins. For example, fiddles may optionally be set up with a bridge with a flatter arch to reduce the range of bow-arm motion needed for techniques such as the double shuffle, a form of bariolage involving rapid alternation between pairs of adjacent strings. To produce a brighter tone than the deep tones of gut or synthetic core strings, fiddlers often use steel strings. The fiddle is part of many traditional (folk) styles, which are typically aural traditions—taught "by ear" rather than via written music.

Fiddling is the act of playing the fiddle, and fiddlers are musicians who play it. Among musical styles, fiddling tends to produce rhythms that focus on dancing, with associated quick note changes, whereas classical music tends to contain more vibrato and sustained notes. Fiddling is also open to improvisation and embellishment with ornamentation at the player's discretion, in contrast to orchestral performances, which adhere to the composer's notes to reproduce a work faithfully. It is less common for a classically trained violinist to play folk music, but today, many fiddlers (e.g., Alasdair Fraser, Brittany Haas, and Alison Krauss) have classical training.

== History ==
The medieval fiddle emerged in 10th-century Europe, deriving from the Byzantine lira (Ancient Greek: λύρα, Latin: lira, English: lyre), a bowed string instrument of the Byzantine Empire and ancestor of most European bowed instruments.

Lira spread widely westward to Europe; in the 11th and 12th centuries European writers use the terms fiddle and lira interchangeably when referring to bowed instruments.

The violin in its present form emerged in early 16th-century northern Italy. The earliest pictures of violins, albeit with three strings, are seen in northern Italy around 1530, at around the same time as the words "violino" and "vyollon" are seen in Italian and French documents. One of the earliest explicit descriptions of the instrument, including its tuning, is from the Epitome musical by Jambe de Fer, published in Lyon in 1556. By this time, the violin had already begun to spread throughout Europe. The fiddle proved very popular among both street musicians and the nobility; the French king Charles IX ordered Andrea Amati to construct 24 violins for him in 1560. One of these instruments, the Charles IX, is the oldest surviving violin.

Over the centuries, Europe continued to have two distinct types of fiddles: one, relatively square-shaped, held in the arms, became known as the viola da braccio (arm viol) family and evolved into the violin; the other, with sloping shoulders and held between the knees, was the viola da gamba (leg viol) group. During the Renaissance the gambas were important and elegant instruments; they eventually lost ground to the louder viola da braccio family.

== Etymology ==
The etymology of fiddle is uncertain: it probably derives from the Latin fidula, which is the early word for violin, or it may be natively Germanic.

The name appears to be related to Icelandic fiðla and also Old English fiðele. A native Germanic ancestor of fiddle might even be the ancestor of the early Romance form of violin.

In medieval times, fiddle also referred to a predecessor of today's violin. Like the violin, it tended to have four strings, but came in a variety of shapes and sizes. Another family of instruments that contributed to the development of the modern fiddle are the viols, which are held between the legs and played vertically, and have fretted fingerboards.

== Ensembles ==
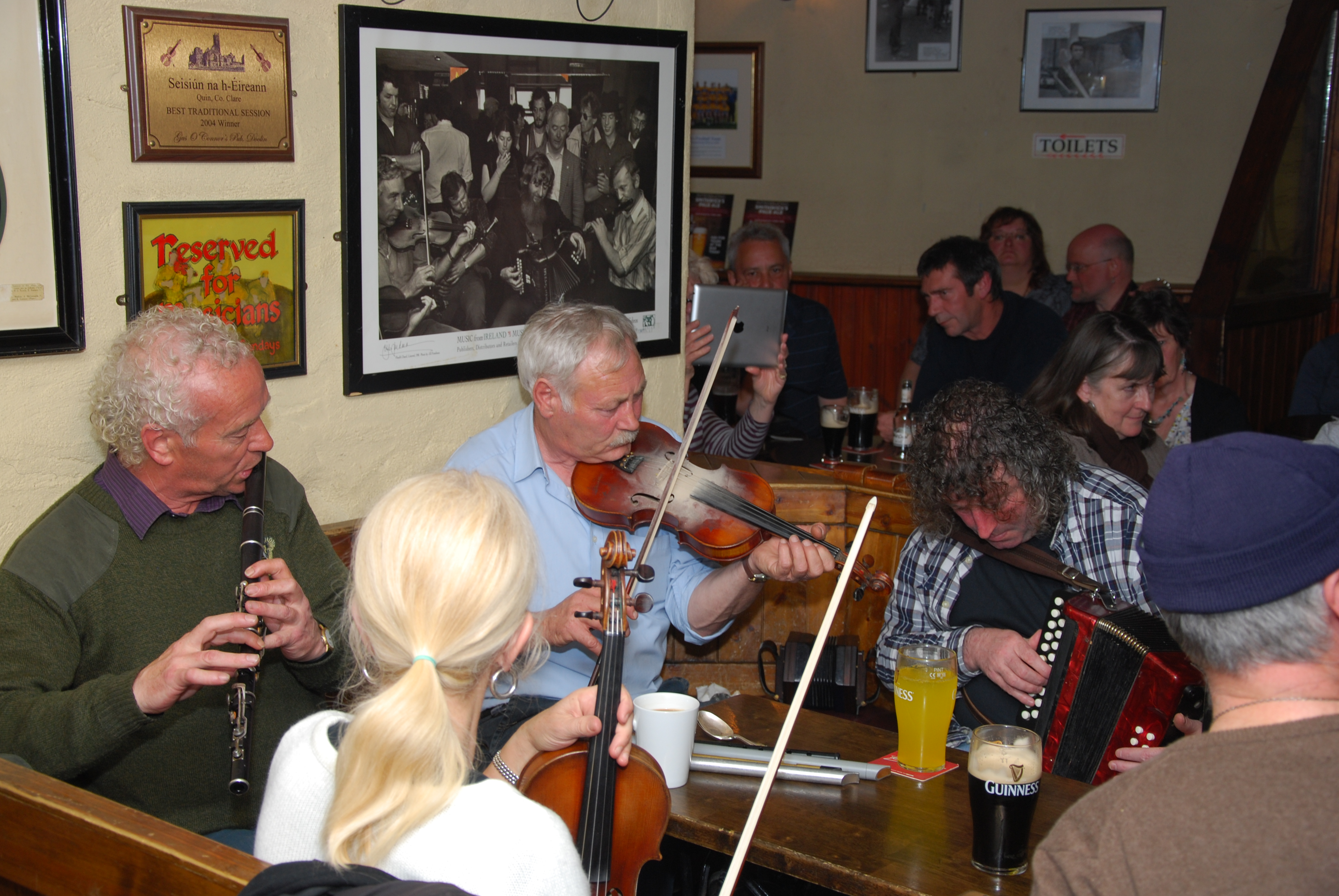
Fiddlers participating in a session at a pub in Ireland

In performance, a solo fiddler, or one or two with a group of other instrumentalists, is the norm, though twin fiddling is represented in some North American, Scandinavian, Scottish and Irish styles. Following the folk revivals of the second half of the 20th century, it became common for less formal situations to find large groups of fiddlers playing together—see for example the Calgary Fiddlers, Swedish Spelmanslag folk-musician clubs, and the worldwide phenomenon of Irish sessions.

Orchestral violins, on the other hand, are commonly grouped in sections, or "chairs". These contrasting traditions may be vestiges of historical performance settings: large concert halls where violins were played required more instruments, before electronic amplification, than did more intimate dance halls and houses that fiddlers played in.

The difference was likely compounded by the different sounds expected of violin music and fiddle music. Historically, the majority of fiddle music was dance music, while violin music had either grown out of dance music or was something else entirely. Violin music came to value a smoothness that fiddling, with its dance-driven clear beat, did not always follow. In situations that required greater volume, a fiddler (as long as they kept the beat) could push their instrument harder than could a violinist. Various fiddle traditions have differing values.

=== Scottish, with cello ===
In the very late 20th century, a few artists successfully reconstructed the Scottish tradition of violin and "big fiddle", or cello. Notable recorded examples include Iain Fraser and Christine Hanson, Amelia Kaminski and Christine Hanson's Bonnie Lasses, Alasdair Fraser and Natalie Haas' Fire and Grace, and Tim Macdonald and Jeremy Ward's The Wilds.

=== Balkan, with kontra ===
Hungarian, Slovenian, and Romanian fiddle players are often accompanied by a three-stringed variant of the viola—known as the kontra—and by double bass, with cimbalom and clarinet being less standard yet still common additions to a band. In Hungary, a three-stringed viola variant with a flat bridge, called the kontra or háromhúros brácsa makes up part of a traditional rhythm section in Hungarian folk music. The flat bridge lets the musician play three-string chords. A three-stringed double bass variant is also used.

== Styles ==
To a greater extent than classical violin playing, fiddle playing is characterized by a huge variety of ethnic or folk music traditions, each of which has its own distinctive sound.

=== Europe ===
==== Great Britain ====
- English folk music fiddling, including:
  - Northumbrian fiddle style, which features "seconding", an improvised harmony part played by a second fiddler.
  - Lakeland or Cumbrian fiddling has a repertoire largely based upon hornpipes but also incorporates reels and jigs.
  - Yorkshire fiddling is a combination of two main approaches: a clearly phrased and articulated performance with few slurs but sometimes with open string drones, similar to the playing of Cotswold Morris and Southern English country dance musicians; for more notey tunes, a more fluent style with irregular slurs which shift the accent around between on-beats and off-beats, similar to Northumbrian fiddle music.
- Scottish fiddling, including:
  - Shetland fiddling, which includes trowie tunes said to come from peerie folk. The style is characterised by "ringing strings" and syncopated rhythms.
  - A North East (particularly Aberdeenshire and Moray) tradition strongly influenced by baroque violin technique with staccato and Scotch snap bowing techniques and double stops.
  - A Scottish Borders tradition with a repertoire heavy in hornpipes and with heavy use of double stops.
  - A Highland tradition, highly influenced by the ornamentation and mixolydian scale of the Great Highland Bagpipe, as well as smoother bowing than other Scottish fiddle styles and a swinging of the 6/8 jig rhythm.
  - A West Highland and Hebridean Tradition, very closely related to the Highland tradition with major influence from the Gaelic song tradition.
  - An Orkney tradition with simpler bowing and ornamentation but with tunes featuring accidentals.
- Welsh fiddling (Welsh Ffidil; see Ar Log), a recently revived tradition.

==== Ireland ====
- Irish folk music fiddling including:
  - Donegal fiddling from the northwest in Ulster, which features mazurkas and a Scottish-influenced repertoire including Strathspey and Highland Fling dances. Fiddlers tend to play fast and make heavy use of staccato bowing and may from time to time "play the bass", meaning a second fiddler may play a melody an octave below where a first fiddler is playing it.
  - Sligo fiddling from northern Connacht, which like Donegal fiddling tends to be fast, but with a bouncier feel to the bowing.
  - Galway fiddling southern Connacht, which is slower than Sligo or Donegal traditions, with a heavier emphasis on ornamentation. Tunes are occasionally played in Eb or Bb to match the tonality of flat pipes.
  - Clare fiddling from northern Munster, which tends to be played near the slower Galway tempo yet with a greater emphasis on the melody itself rather than ornamentation.
  - Sliabh Luachra fiddling from the southwest in Munster, characterized by a unique repertoire of polkas and slides, the use of double stops and drones, as well as playing the melody in two octaves as in Donegal.

==== Nordic countries ====
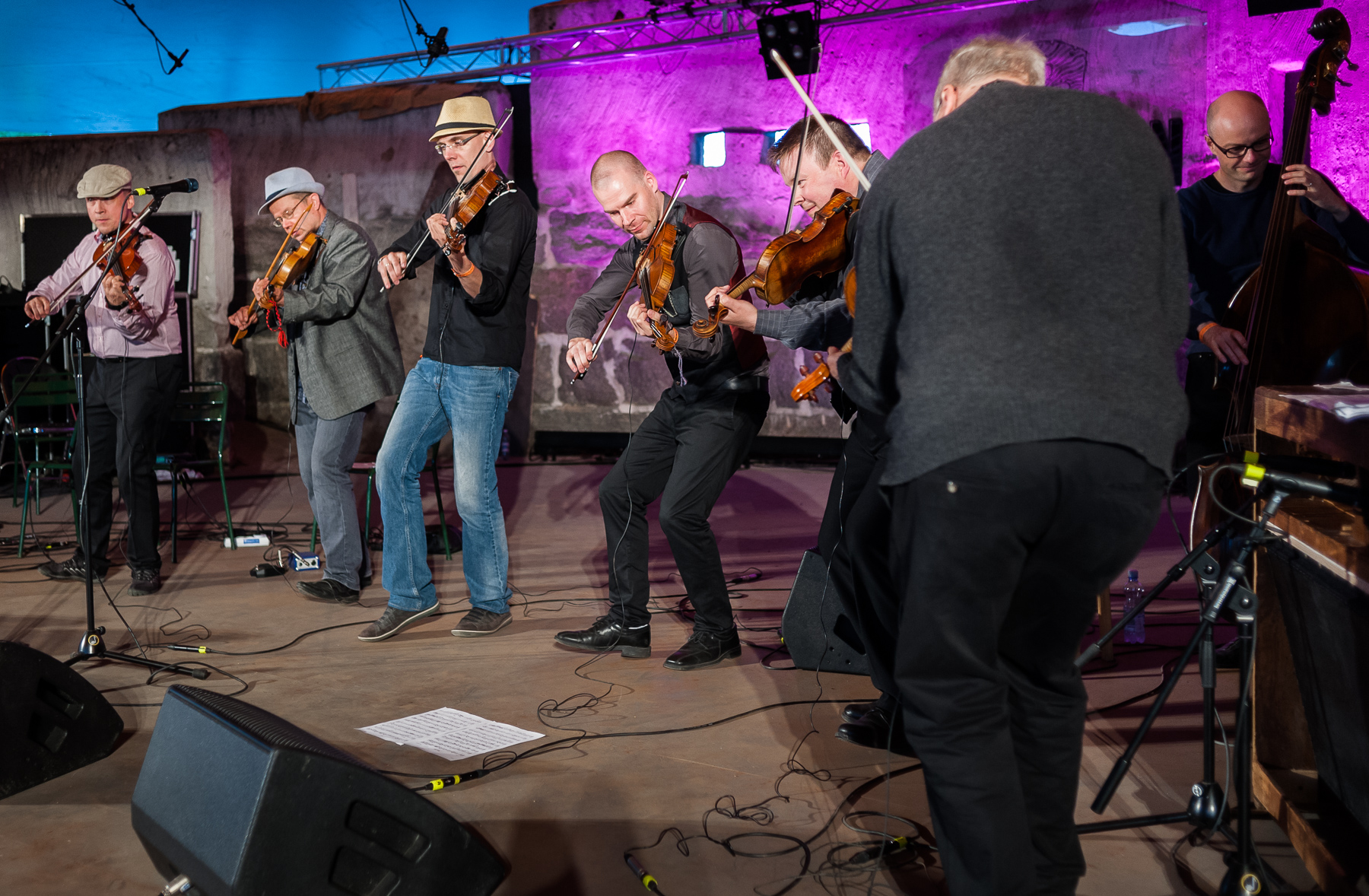
The folk music band JPP at the 2015 Kaustinen Folk Music Festival in Kaustinen, Finland

- Norwegian fiddling (including Hardanger fiddling; see also Bygdedans and Gammaldans), including traditions from:
  - Røros and Nord-Noreg styles, both using the standard fiddle.
  - Finnskogen, using the standard fiddle, but featuring some flatted notes influenced by Finnish folk music.
  - Voss and Telemark styles, both using the Hardanger fiddle.
  - Setesdal, which uses both standard and Hardanger fiddles.
- Swedish fiddling (including Låtfiol playing; see also Spelmanslag and Gammaldans), including traditions from:
  - Jämtland
  - Dalarna
- Finnish fiddling, including the regional styles of:
  - Kaustinen
  - Ostrobothnia, heavily influenced by Swedish fiddling.

==== Continental Europe ====
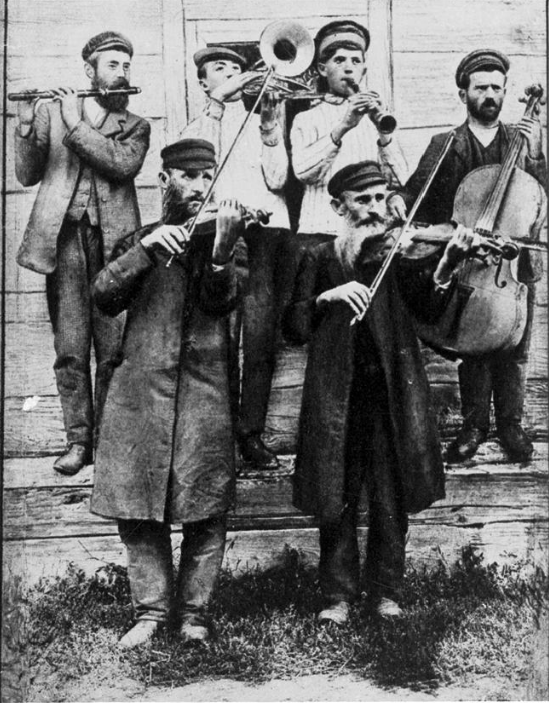
Klezmer fiddlers at a wedding, Ukraine, ca. 1925

- Austrian fiddling
- French fiddling, including an old tradition from Corrèze and a revived one from Brittany
- Hungarian folk music traditions
- Italian fiddling
- Klezmer fiddling
- Polish fiddling
- Mainland Portuguese and Azorean fiddling
- Romanian fiddling

=== Americas ===
==== United States ====
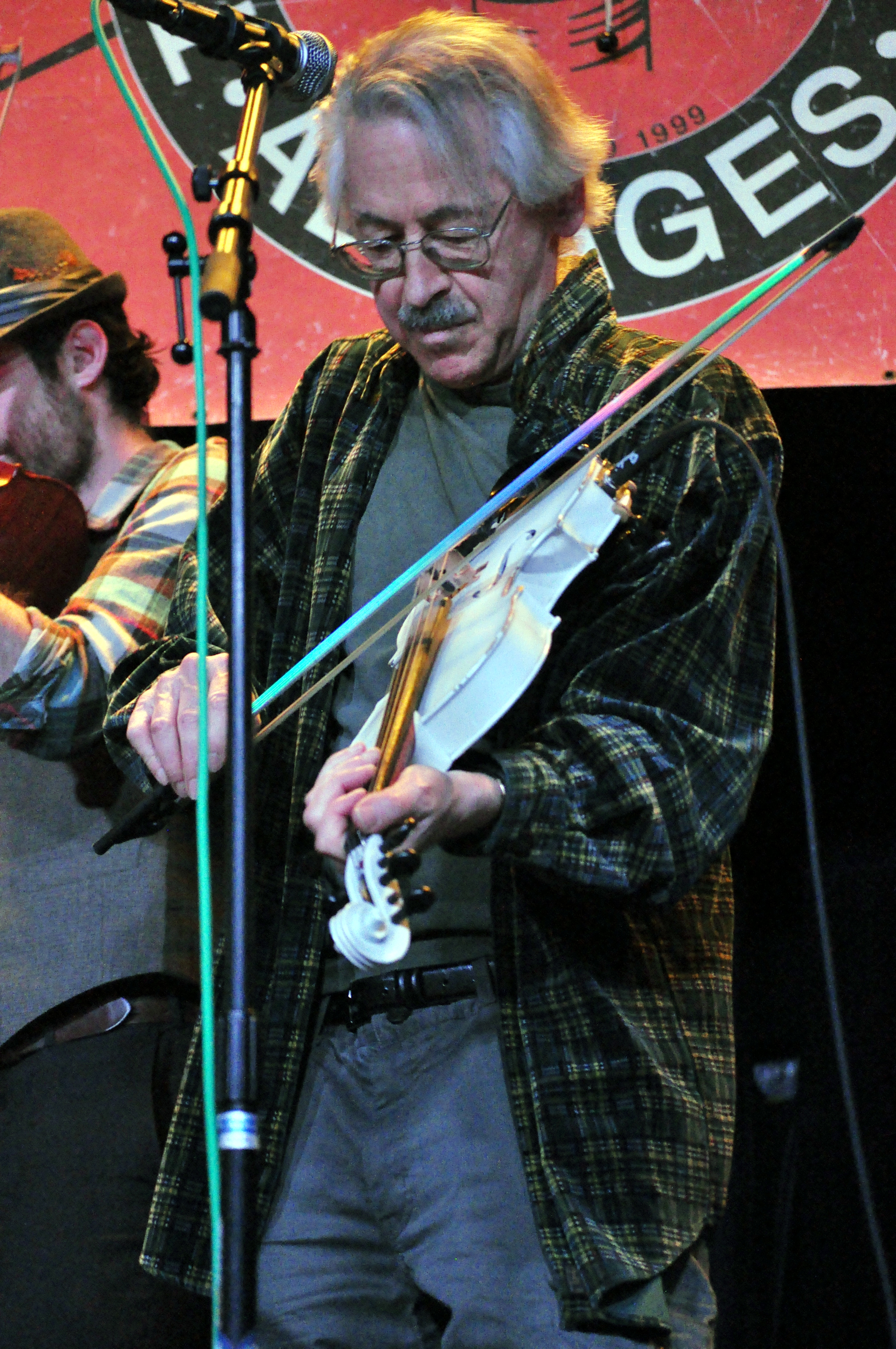
Peter Stampfel from The Holy Modal Rounders

American fiddling is a broad category including traditional and modern styles:

===== Traditional =====
- Blues fiddling
- Cajun and Zydeco fiddling
- Native American fiddling, including:
  - Cherokee
  - Creek
  - Tohono O'odham waila music, a style heavily influenced by Mexican fiddling and featuring irregular counts and harmonies in thirds, fourths, and sixths.
- Old time fiddling, including:
  - Fiddling from Appalachia and Affrilachia, the most well-known style today, featuring heavy use of droning and double-stops as well as syncopated bowing patterns.
  - Athabaskan fiddling of the Interior Alaska.
  - Midwestern fiddling, highly influenced by Scandinavian music.
  - Ozarks fiddling, faster and crisper bowing than Appalachia.
  - Texas fiddling, with influences from Mexican fiddling and an emphasis on competitive playing.
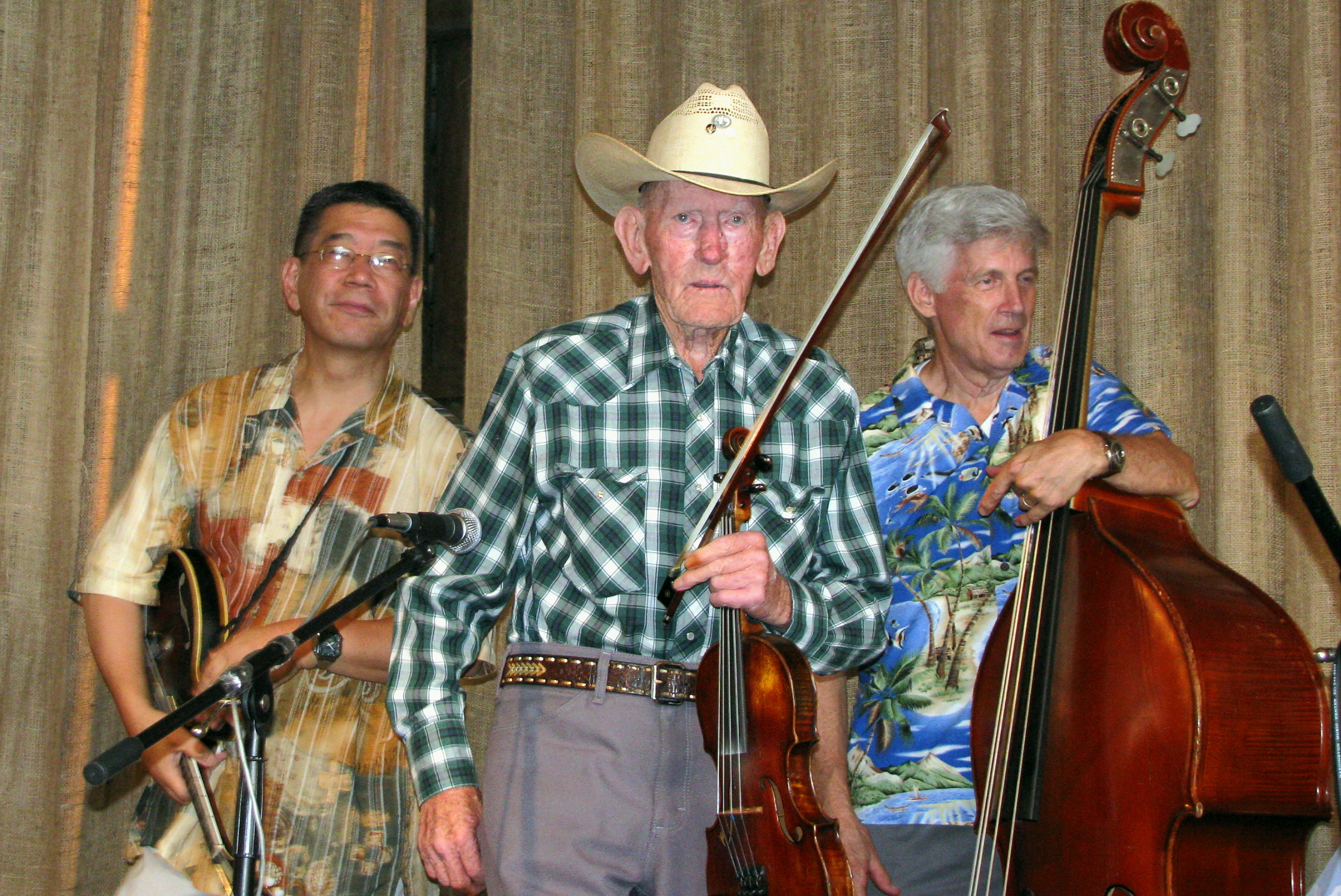
    Bluegrass fiddler Kenny Baker
  - New England fiddling, with strong influences from Québécois/French Canadian and British repertoires.
  - Northwest fiddling, with influences from both Ozark and Midwestern fiddle styles, though with a strong emphasis on competitive playing like Texas fiddling.

===== Modern =====
- Bluegrass fiddling
- Country fiddling
- Western swing style fiddling

==== Canada ====
Fiddling remains popular in Canada, and the various homegrown styles of Canadian fiddling are seen as an important part of the country's cultural identity, as celebrated during the opening ceremony of the Vancouver 2010 Winter Olympics.

- Cape Breton fiddling, with a distinct Scottish influence
- French Canadian fiddling including "crooked tunes", that is, tunes with irregular beat patterns.
- Métis fiddling, of central and western Canada featuring strong French Canadian influence, but with even more "crooked" tunes.
- Newfoundland fiddling, also featuring many crooked tunes, colloquially termed 'singles' or 'doubles'.
- Maritimes, Acadian or Downeast style of fiddling, which has many similarities to Cape Breton fiddling
- English Canadian fiddling or Anglo-Canadian fiddling

==== Mexico ====
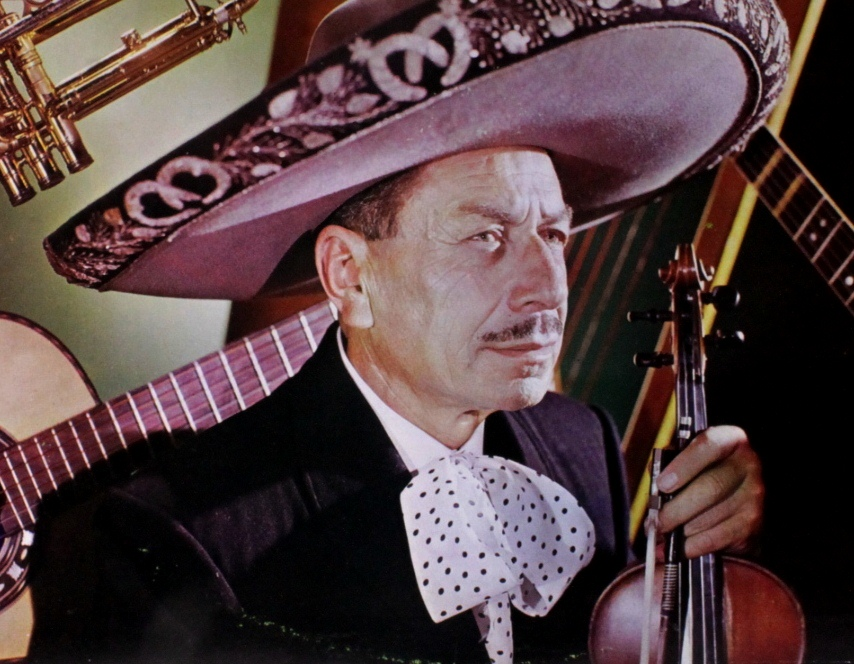
Silvestre Vargas (1901–1985), fiddler of the Mariachi Vargas from 1921 to 1975, director from 1931 to 1955

Mexican fiddling includes

- Danza indígena
- Mariachi
- Son arribeño
- Son calentano
- Son huasteco
- Son planeco
- Violín-tambora
- Violín tuxtleco
- Violín mixteco

==== South America ====
- Forró, a type of music from Brazil, including the rabeca fiddle tradition
- Peruvian violin

=== Africa, Asia and Australia ===
- African fiddle
- Australian folk music traditions
- Huqin Chinese fiddles
- Morna fiddling from Cape Verde
- Indian fiddle
- Indian classical music

== Related instruments ==
=== Variants ===
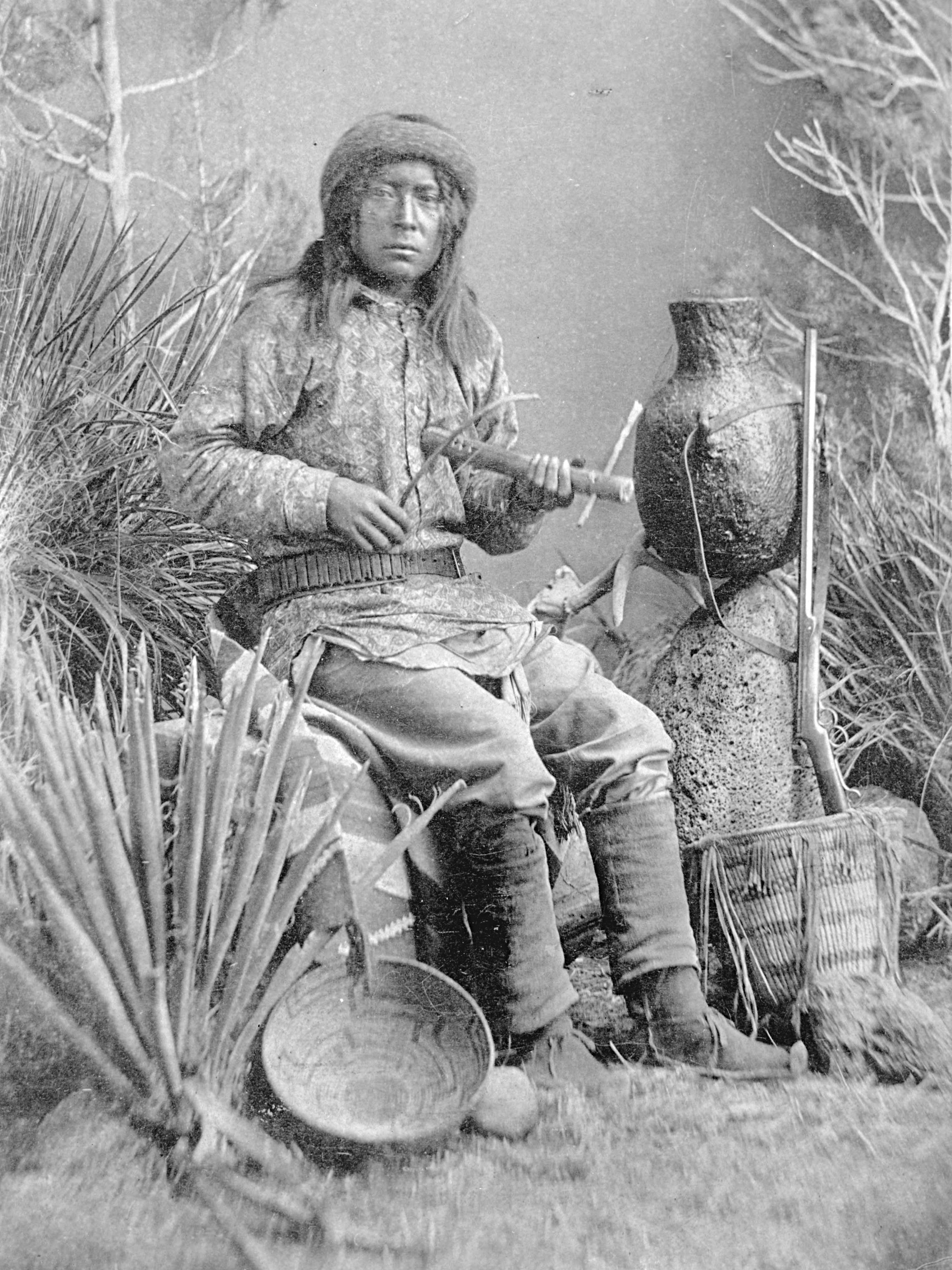
Chasi, a Warm Springs Apache musician, playing the Apache fiddle, 1886

- Hardanger fiddle
- Stroh violin or phonofiddle, known in Romanian as Vioara cu goarnă.

=== Near relations ===
- Cello
- Double bass
- Kontra
- Låtfiol
- Rebec
- Rabeca
- Viola

=== Distant relations ===
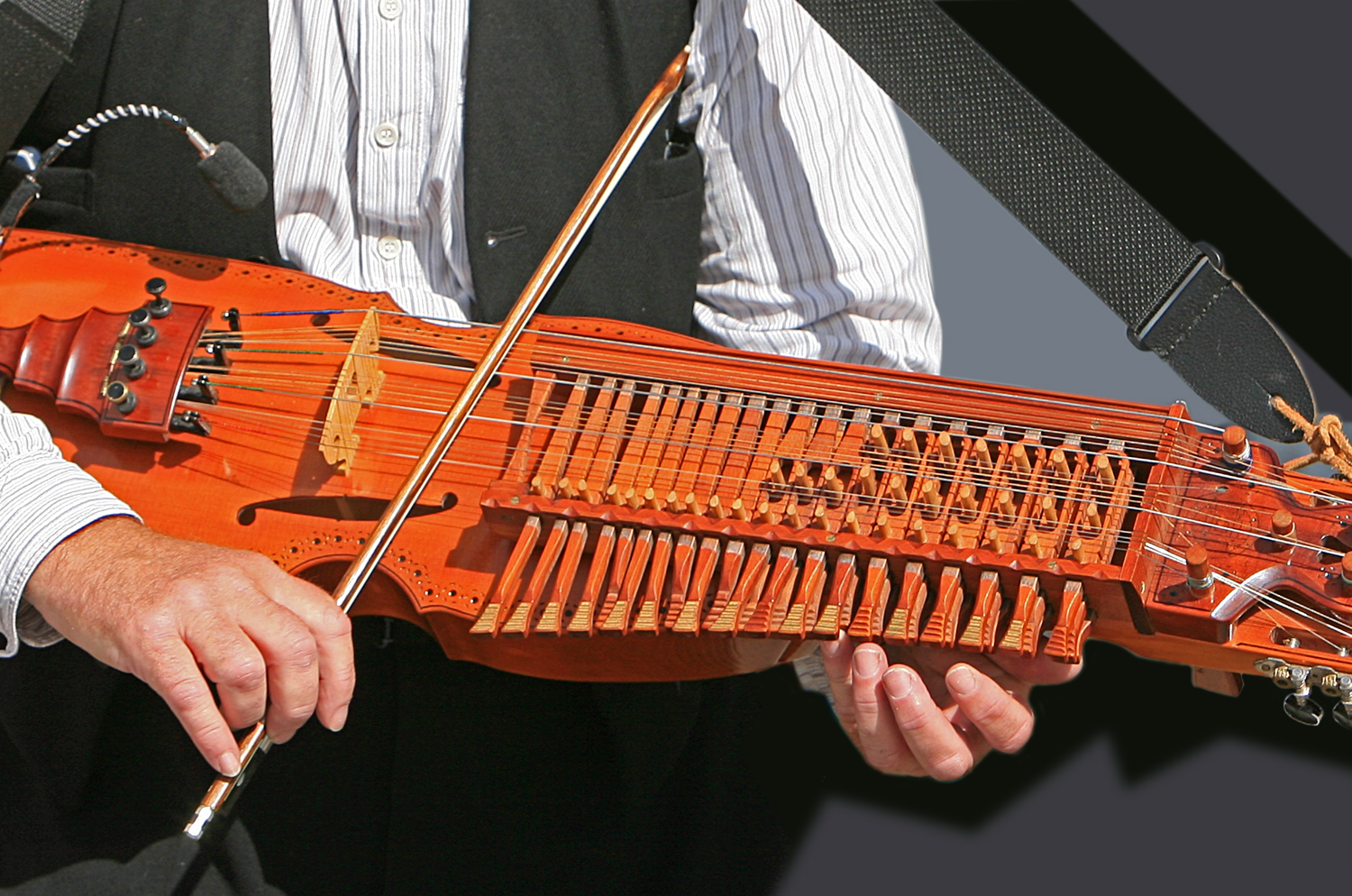
A nyckelharpa being played

- Apache fiddle
- Byzantine lyra, the medieval bowed instrument of the Byzantine Empire
- Cretan Lyra
- Crwth
- Gadulka
- Gudok
- Gusle
- Hurdy-gurdy also known as the wheel fiddle
- Kamancheh
- Lijerica
- Nyckelharpa
- Rebab
- Erhu
- morin khuur

== See also ==
- Fleadh Cheoil
- List of All-Ireland Champions
- List of fiddlers
- Jazz violin
- Hardanger fiddle
