= Strathspey (dance) =

Type of dance tune

A strathspey (/stræθˈspeɪ/) is a type of dance tune in 4/4 time, featuring dotted rhythms (both long-short and short-long "Scotch snaps"), which in traditional playing are generally somewhat exaggerated rhythmically. Examples of strathspeys are the songs "The Bonnie Banks o' Loch Lomond" and "Coming Through the Rye" (which is based on an older tune called "The Miller's Daughter").

Strathspeys may be played anywhere from 108 beats per minute for Highland dance up to 160 beats per minute for step dance. Traditionally, a strathspey will be followed by a reel, which is in 2/2 with even eighth-notes, as a release of the rhythmic tension created during the strathspey.

It has been hypothesized that strathspeys mimic the rhythms of Scottish Gaelic song. Among traditional musicians, strathspeys are occasionally transmitted as canntaireachd, a style of singing in which various syllables are used to vocalize traditional bagpipe embellishments.

The dance is named after the Strathspey region of Scotland, in Moray and Badenoch and Strathspey. Strathspey refers both to the type of tune and to the type of dance usually done to it (although strathspeys are also frequently danced to pastoral airs played at the same tempo; an example of which would be the dance Autumn in Appin, danced to the tune "The Hills of Lorne"). The strathspey is one of the dance types in Scottish country dancing. According to William Lamb on the Bagpipe News website, the first mention of the word "Strathspey" in connection with a specific type of dance is the anonymous Menzies manuscript dated to 1749. A Scottish country dance will typically consist of equal numbers of strathspeys, jigs and reels. The strathspey step is a slower and more stately version of the skip-change step used for jigs and reels. The strathspey also forms part of the musical format for competing pipe bands. Modern high grade pipe bands are required to play a march, a strathspey and a reel for competition purposes.

Many strathspeys were written in the 18th and 19th centuries by composers such as William Marshall, James Scott Skinner, and Magdalene Stirling, who utilised the full range of the fiddle to produce many memorable tunes. Skinner distinguished between dance tunes, which retained the staccato bowing (Laird o Drumblair), and airs which were for listening (Music of Spey). Angus Cumming produced the first collection of strathspeys to be published by a person from Strathspey. More recently, Muriel Johnstone has written some elegant piano strathspeys. These days there are at least four, some would say seven, varieties: the bouncy schottische, the strong strathspey, the song or air strathspey, all three of which can be enjoyed for dancing, and the competition strathspey for the Great Highland bagpipe, primarily intended as a display of virtuosity. Although band and solo competition bagpiping generally involves a complicated, heavily ornamented setting, traditional pipers often play simpler, more rhythmically driven versions.

In the Irish tradition, strathspeys are largely relegated to the Scottish-influenced traditions of Donegal, where they are commonly called highlands. Unlike many duple-time tune types in the Irish tradition, Highlands are articulated with four distinct beats to the bar, rather than two. Unlike their Scottish counterparts, highlands are played with a smoother, less-jagged articulation, and the dotted rhythms tend to devolve into long passages of triplets.

In the New World, the Cape Breton strathspey differs from its Scottish cousins in that the "snaps" can come at any point in the measure; they have been described as more "wild" than in Scottish playing. Cape Breton dot-snaps often follow the same pattern within any given piece of music, and adhere to a local pattern shared among the community of Cape Breton-style players.

== Printed collections ==
Among printed collections of Strathspeys, Keith MacDonald's "The Skye Collection of the Best Reels and Strathspeys" (1887) has over 400 tunes. It is mentioned on the website "The Session" under the article for "Clark's Strathspey". Peter Wyper recorded a version of "Lord Lynedoch" on cylinder in the period 1901 - 1907. (see "The Session" article referenced above). It is not easy to determine the most frequently recorded strathspey but "Monymusk" has been recorded 24 times. (see "The Session" again). The "tunearch" website has 21 transcriptions of "Money Musk", originally dated to 1789.

== See also ==
- List of Scottish country dances
