= Reel (dance) =

Form of Scottish folk dance and music

The reel is a folk dance type as well as the accompanying dance tune type. Of Scottish origin, reels are also an important part of the repertoire of the fiddle traditions of Britain, Ireland and North America. In Scottish country dancing, the reel is one of the four traditional dances, the others being the jig, the strathspey and the waltz, and is also the name of a dance figure.

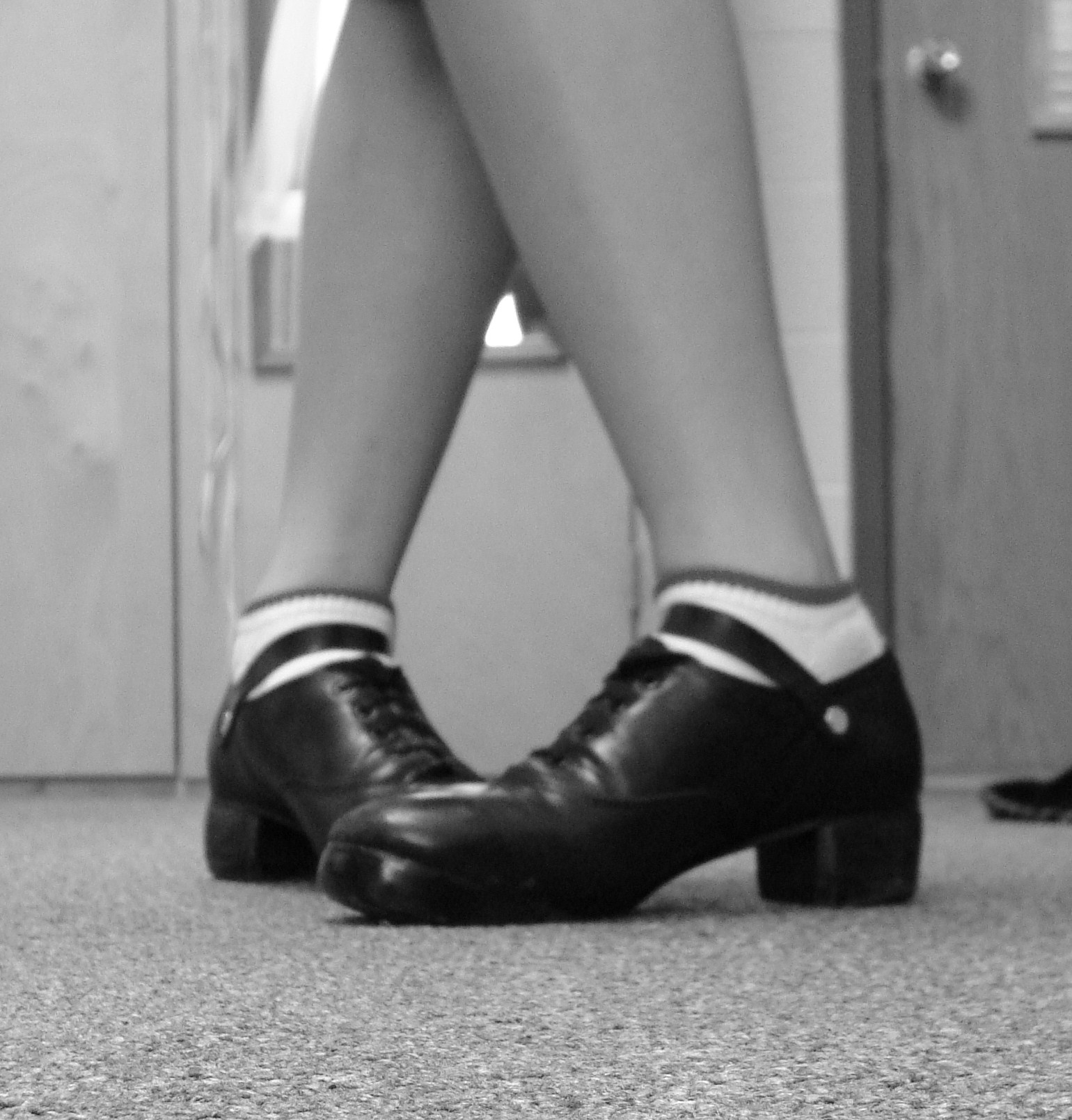
Hard shoes worn for Irish dance

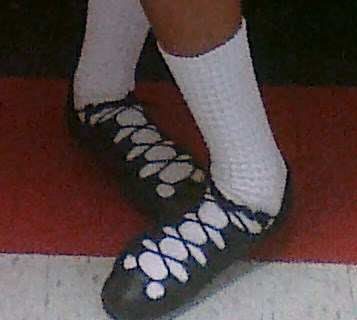
Soft shoes worn for Irish dance

In Irish dance, a reel is any dance danced to music in reel time (see below). In Irish stepdance, the reel is danced in soft shoes and is one of the first dances taught to students. There is also a treble reel, danced in hard shoes to reel music.

== History ==
The reel is indigenous to Scotland. The earliest reference was in a trial of 1590, where the accused was reported to have "daunced this reill or short dance." However, the form may go back to the Middle Ages. The name may be cognate with or relate to an Old Norse form, with Suio-Gothic rulla, meaning "to whirl." This became Anglo-Saxon hreol and Gaelic ruidhle or ruidhleadh, which is the origin of the word now.

After being introduced to Ireland in the late eighteenth century it thrived. Later it was introduced to North America by English, Scottish, and Irish colonists and immigrants. In the United States, reels remain central in the traditions of Anglo and African-American old-time music and square dancing, as well as Cajun and zydeco. In Canada, they are important parts of Cape Breton, Acadian, Québécois, and Métis repertoires.

== Reel music ==
The wind that shakes that Barley
A reel performed by Dancing Willow

Drowsy Maggie
A reel featuring viola da gamba and recorder, performed by Dancing Willow

Reel music is notated in simple metre, most commonly either in 2/2 or 4/4. For example, the same reel Rakish Paddy is notated in a 2/2 time signature in O'Neill's Music of Ireland, New & Revisited, but in 4/4 time in English, Welsh, Scottish & Irish Fiddle Tunes, with no change to the note lengths.

All reels consist largely of quaver (eighth note) movement with an accent on the first and third beats of the bar. A reel is distinguished from a hornpipe in two ways. Firstly it is played with even beats, without swing or dotted rhythm. Secondly it is played twice as fast, implied by the 2/2 time signature. Like most dance music originating in the British Isles, reels are usually composed in binary form, meaning they have two parts (A and B); in most reels each part is repeated (AABB), but in others it is not (ABAB). Each part (A and B) typically has eight bars, which in turn are divisible into four-bar and two-bar phrases. (An exception is the "auld reel" of Shetland which tends to irregular structure and may have been influenced by the Norwegian halling.) A reel usually has 32 bars (with structure AABB), but there are other common structures such as 40 bar reels (often played for the introduction of the Eightsome Reel) and 64 bar reels (with structure AABBCCDD).

Reels are popular in the folk music of South West England. They crossed the Atlantic ocean with Irish and British immigration and thus entered the musical tradition of Atlantic and French-speaking Canada including that of Quebecers and Acadians. Reels are featured in many pieces by Quebec singers and bands, such as La Bolduc, La Bottine Souriante and even the more modern néo-trad group Les Cowboys Fringants.
