= List of winners of the Gold Medal, Senior Piobaireachd and Former Winners' MSR at the Argyllshire Gathering =

The Argyllshire Gathering is an annual Highland games held in August in Oban, Scotland.

== Solo piping events ==
The solo piping events at the Argyllshire Gathering are some of the most prestigious in the solo calendar.

Winning the Gold Medal for pibroch at either the Argyllshire Gathering or Northern Meeting qualifies the winner to play in the Senior Pibroch competition, and an invitation to play at the Glenfiddich Championships.

Entry to the Former Winners March, Strathspey & Reel is restricted to past winners of the A-Grade March, Strathspey & Reel event.

== Winners ==
Eight players in history have won both Gold Medals in the same year, these players are denoted with an asterisk (*).

| Year | Gold Medal | Former Winners March, Strathspey & Reel | Senior Piobaireachd |
|---|---|---|---|
| 1873 | D.S. MacDonald | - | - |
| 1874 | Ronald MacKenkie, Piper to MacDonald of Dunach | - | - |
| 1875 | John MacBean, Piper to Lord Middleton | - | - |
| 1876 | Malcolm MacPherson, (Calum Piobaire) Piper to Cluny | - | - |
| 1877 | John MacBean, Piper to Lord Middleton | - | - |
| 1878 | William MacLennan, Dundee Police | - | - |
| 1879 | George MacDonald, South Morar | - | - |
| 1880 | Robert MacKinnon | - | - |
| 1881 | John MacColl, Bonawe | - | - |
| 1882 | Angus MacDonald, Piper to MacDonell of South Morar | - | - |
| 1883 | Angus MacRae, Piper to Mr H.E.Wood, Raasay | - | - |
| 1884 | John MacDougall Gillies, Aberdeen | - | - |
| 1885 | Pipe Major John Cameron, 2nd Queens Own Cameron Highlanders | - | - |
| 1886 | Pipe Major Robert Meldrum, 2nd Argyll and Sutherland Highlanders | - | - |
| 1887 | Pipe Major John MacKay, 4th Argyll and Sutherland Highlanders | - | - |
| 1888 | Kenneth MacDonald | - | - |
| 1889 | John MacPherson | - | - |
| 1890 | Norman MacPherson | - | - |
| 1891 | David C. Mather, Lochcarron | - | - |
| 1892 | Archibald R. MacColl | - | - |
| 1893 | William Robb | - | - |
| 1894 | George J. Ross | - | - |
| 1895 | John MacKenzie | - | - |
| 1896 | Gavin Campbell MacDougall | - | - |
| 1897 | John MacDonald of Inverness | - | - |
| 1898 | Farquar MacRae | - | - |
| 1899 | Murdo MacKenzie, Piper to Mr. A.E. Butter, Faskally | - | - |
| 1900 | No competition | - | - |
| 1901 | John Wallace | - | - |
| 1902 | Corporal Piper William Ross, Seaforth Highlanders | - | - |
| 1903 | Pipe Major Donald Mathieson, 3rd Highland Light Infantry | - | - |
| 1904 | PC G. S. McLennan, 1st Battalion Gordon Highlanders | - | - |
| 1905 | George S. Allan, 2nd Scottish Horse | - | - |
| 1906 | James A Center, Edinburgh | - | - |
| 1907 | Pipe Major Willie Ross, 2nd Scots Guards | - | - |
| 1908 | Roderick Campbell, Inverness | - | - |
| 1909 | William Gray, Govan Police | - | - |
| 1910 | Pipe Sergeant William Lawrie, 8th Argyll and Sutherland Highlanders* | - | - |
| 1911 | George Yardley, Cambuslang* | - | - |
| 1912 | W. MacLean, Glasgow | - | - |
| 1913 | Pipe Major James Taylor, Highland Light Infantry | - | - |
| 1914–18 | Not held due to World War I | - | - |
| 1919 | Pipe Major J.O. Duff, Edinburgh | - | - |
| 1920 | Pipe Major William Taylor, Edinburgh | - | - |
| 1921 | Pipe Major J. Mathieson | - | - |
| 1922 | Pipe Major Robert Reid, Glasgow | - | - |
| 1923 | A.M. Calder, Edinburgh | - | - |
| 1924 | Pipe Major Chisholm, Edinburgh | - | - |
| 1925 | David Ross, Sutherland | - | - |
| 1926 | John MacDonald, City of Glasgow Police* | - | - |
| 1927 | J. Wilson, Edinburgh | - | - |
| 1928 | Hugh Kennedy | - | - |
| 1929 | Pipe Major J.D. MacDonald, 1st Scots Guards | - | - |
| 1930 | Robert B. Nicol, Crathie* (Sovereign's Piper) | - | - |
| 1931 | Robert U. Brown, Muir of Ord | - | - |
| 1932 | PS J. Robertson, 2nd Scots Guards | - | - |
| 1933 | Malcolm R. MacPherson, Invershin | - | - |
| 1934 | Pipe Major C. Smith, 2nd Black Watch | - | - |
| 1935 | LC Nicol MacCullum, 8th Argyll and Sutherland Highlanders | - | - |
| 1936 | Donald Iain MacKenzie, Tongue | - | - |
| 1937 | Donald F. Ross, Lochgilphead | - | - |
| 1938 | Roderick MacDonald, City of Glasgow Police | - | - |
| 1939–45 | Not held due to World War II | - | - |
| 1946 | Pipe Major P. Bain. Glasgow | - | - |
| 1947 | Robert G. Hardie, Glasgow | - | - |
| 1948 | Donald MacPherson, Glasgow | - | - |
| 1949 | PS R. MacKay, CH | - | - |
| 1950 | John D. Burgess, Edinburgh* | - | - |
| 1951 | Pipe Major Donald MacLean, Lewis | - | - |
| 1952 | Pipe Major R. McCallum, Inveraray | - | - |
| 1953 | James MacColl, Shotts | - | - |
| 1954 | Pipe Major Donald R. MacLeod, Seaforth Highlanders | - | - |
| 1955 | William MacDonald, Inverness | - | - |
| 1956 | Pipe Major D MacLennan, N. Berwick | - | - |
| 1957 | RSM John MacLellan, Seaforth Highlanders | - | - |
| 1958 | Iain MacFadyen, Glasgow | - | - |
| 1959 | Kenneth MacDonald, Glasgow | - | - |
| 1960 | John MacFadyen, Glasgow | - | - |
| 1961 | Ronald Lawrie, City of Glasgow Police | - | - |
| 1962 | Seumas MacNeill, Bearsden | - | - |
| 1963 | Sergeant Angus MacDonald, Scots Guards | - | - |
| 1964 | Hector MacFadyen, Pennyghael/Glasgow* | - | - |
| 1965 | Neil MacEachern, Islay | - | - |
| 1966 | Duncan MacFadyen, Johnstone | - | - |
| 1967 | William MacDonald, Benbecula | - | - |
| 1968 | Thomas Pearston, Glasgow | - | - |
| 1969 | John MacDougall, Arbroath | - | - |
| 1970 | Andrew Wright, Paisley* | - | - |
| 1971 | Finlay MacNeill, Inverness | - | - |
| 1972 | Hugh McCallum, Bridge of Allen | - | - |
| 1973 | Angus J. MacLellan, City of Glasgow Police | - | - |
| 1974 | Kenneth MacLean, Glasgow | - | - |
| 1975 | Arthur G. Gillies, Kilchrenan | - | - |
| 1976 | Malcolm MacRae, Kirriemuir | - | - |
| 1977 | Ian Clowe, Dumfries | - | - |
| 1978 | James McIntosh, Dundee | - | - |
| 1979 | William Livingstone, Ontario, Canada | - | - |
| 1980 | Murray Henderson, Eassie, Angus | - | - |
| 1981 | Gavin Stoddart, Edinburgh | - | - |
| 1982 | Pipe Major Evan MacRae, Fort William | - | - |
| 1983 | John Wilson, Strathclyde Police | - | - |
| 1984 | Michael Cusack, Texas, USA | - | - |
| 1985 | Robert Wallace, Glasgow | - | - |
| 1986 | Alfred Morrison, Bishopston | - | - |
| 1987 | John Hanning, New Zealand | - | - |
| 1988 | Roddy MacLeod, Cumbernauld | - | - |
| 1989 | Corporal Alasdair Gillies, Queen's Own Highlanders | - | - |
| 1990 | Sergeant Brian Donaldson, Scots Guards. | - | - |
| 1991 | James MacGillivray, Ontario, Canada | Angus MacColl | - |
| 1992 | Colin MacLellan, Ontario, Canada | - | - |
| 1993 | Corporal Gordon Walker, Royal Highland Fusiliers | - | - |
| 1994 | Dr. Angus MacDonald, Skye | - | - |
| 1995 | Willie McCallum, Clydebank | - | - |
| 1996 | Angus MacColl, Oban | - | - |
| 1997 | James Murray, Cupar | - | - |
| 1998 | Niall Matheson, Inverness | Angus MacColl | - |
| 1999 | Major John Cairns, Ontario, Canada* | - | - |
| 2000 | Michael Rogers, Maryland, USA | - | - |
| 2001 | Jack Lee, British Columbia, Canada | - | - |
| 2002 | Iain Speirs, Edinburgh | - | - |
| 2003 | Bruce Gandy, Nova Scotia, Canada | Gordon Walker | Mike Cusack |
| 2004 | Stuart Liddell, Inveraray | Gordon Walker | Angus MacColl |
| 2005 | Euan McCrimmon, Edinburgh | Gordon Walker | Angus MacColl |
| 2006 | Greg Wilson, New Zealand | Roddy MacLeod | Roddy MacLeod |
| 2007 | Richard Hawke, New Zealand | Alasdair Gillies | Gordon Walker |
| 2008 | Niall Stewart, Kyle of Lochalsh, Scotland | Willie McCallum | Roddy MacLeod |
| 2009 | Alastair Dunn, Glasgow | James Murray | Angus MacColl |
| 2010 | Faye Henderson, Kirriemuir, Scotland | Stuart Liddell | Angus MacDonald |
| 2011 | Callum Beaumont, Bo'ness, Scotland | Chris Armstrong | Iain Speirs |
| 2012 | Finlay Johnston, Glasgow | Gordon Walker | Stuart Liddell |
| 2013 | Alan Bevan, British Columbia, Canada | Stuart Liddell | Jack Lee |
| 2014 | Douglas Murray, Fife, Scotland* | Stuart Liddell | Bruce Gandy |
| 2015 | John Angus Smith, London, England | Angus MacColl | Stuart Liddell |
| 2016 | Ian K. MacDonald, Toronto, Canada* | - | Stuart Liddell |
| 2017 | Craig Sutherland, Crieff, Scotland | Jack Lee | Glenn Brown |
| 2018 | Stuart Easton, Palmerston North, New Zealand | Angus MacColl | Stuart Liddell |
| 2019 | Andrew Hayes, Ottawa, Canada | Gordon McCready | Stuart Liddell |
| 2020 | No events held due to COVID-19 pandemic | / | / |
| 2021 | No events held due to COVID-19 pandemic | / | / |
| 2022 | Jamie Forrester, Haddington, Scotland | Connor Sinclair | Angus MacColl |
| 2023 | Alasdair Henderson, Dunoon, Scotland | Angus MacColl | Alex Gandy |
| 2024 | Cameron Drummond, Edinburgh, Scotland | Alasdair Henderson | Christopher Armstrong |
