= Donald Macpherson (piper) =

Scottish bagpipe player

Donald MacPherson
- Born: 5 September 1922; Glasgow
- Died: 21 April 2012 (aged 89); Edinburgh
- Instrument: Bagpipes

Donald MacPherson BEM (1922–2012) was a Scottish bagpipe player, and one of the most successful competitive solo pipers of all time.

== Personal life ==
MacPherson was born into a large family on 5 September 1922 in Glasgow. He received all of his tuition from his father Iain, who was an army piper during the First World War, and had been taught by John MacDougall Gillies. Iain injured his hand when Donald was aged 5 and rarely played his pipes after that, but gave Donald instruction in all aspects of bagpipe playing.

Donald joined the Boys' Brigade pipe band at the age of 12. He entered his first solo competition at the age of 15, at the Cowal Highland Gathering, where he won both the Under 15 March, Strathspey and Reel and the Under 18 Piobaireachd. He also played in the Glasgow Shepherds pipe band under Archie MacPhedran.

After leaving school he was an apprentice at the West of Scotland Engineering Company, but volunteered for the Royal Air Force when the Second World War broke out. Shortly before returning from training in Naples he was seriously injured in a vehicle crash, and never regained full mobility in his left arm.

While stationed in Wiltshire he met his wife Gwen, with whom he had three daughters.

He worked as an engineer and lived for several years outside Scotland, working at Barr and Stroud for many years, and also spending some time at Singer. At times when living outside Scotland he did not compete for several years, but was always able to return to the top level of competition within months. During one of these breaks he became an accomplished pianist.

In 1971 he took up a permanent post at the College of Piping in Glasgow, where he was responsible for testing goods for sale and developing the programme of lessons and courses. He left that post after falling out with Seumas MacNeill, and from then on refused to play in front of MacNeill, so never competed in the Glenfiddich Championships.

He was awarded the British Empire Medal in 1986 for his services to piping. He died on 21 April 2012 in Edinburgh.

== Musical career ==
MacPherson was one of the most successful competitive solo pipers of all time. In 1948, at his first outing at the Argyllshire Gathering in Oban, he won the Gold Medal, and later the same day won the Clasp for former winners of the Gold Medal. In 1954, he won both the Gold Medal and the Clasp at the Northern Meeting in Inverness.

Over his competitive career he accumulated fifteen first places in the Senior Piobaireachd event for former Gold Medal winners at Oban, nine first places in the Clasp competition at Inverness, and six first places in the Former Winners March, Strathspey & Reel event at Inverness. He also won the Bratach Gorm three times out of five attempts.

He retired from competitive playing after winning the Gold Medal at the Argyllshire Gathering at the age of 68, but continued to teach and adjudicate. Some of his students include Gold Medal winners Iain Speirs, Stuart Shedden and Douglas Murray.

Macpherson was renowned for the quality of the bagpipe sound he produced. Until the early 1950s he played his father's pipes, but from then acquired from a colleague a set of 1936 R.G. Lawrie drones with a Robert Hardie chanter. He produced his own chanter reeds and developed tools for manipulating them. He was among the first solo competitors to use synthetic drone reeds.

He composed at least 30 pieces of ceol beag (light music), but despite his competitive success he was not compelled to compose any pibroch.

== Discography ==
- Highland Bagpipes (1970)
- The Master Piper (1989)
- Piping Centre 1996 Vol. 2 (1996)
- Donald MacPherson – A Living Legend (2004)
