= Alasdair Gillies =

Scottish bagpiper

Pipe Major Alasdair Gillies
- Born: 6 December 1963; Glasgow, Scotland
- Died: 27 August 2011 (aged 47); Ullapool, Highland, Scotland
- Military career
- Allegiance: United Kingdom
- Branch: British Army
- Service years: 1980–1997
- Units: Queen's Own Highlanders (Seaforth and Camerons); The Highlanders (Seaforth, Gordons and Camerons)
- Conflicts: The Troubles; Gulf War

Alasdair Gillies (6 December 1963 – 27 August 2011) was a Scottish bagpiper and tutor, and one of the most successful competitive solo players of all time.

== Life ==
Alasdair was born in Glasgow to parents Norman and Kathleen Gillies and lived there for the first eleven years of his life before moving to Ullapool, a fishing village on the West of Scotland where his father took on the position of piping instructor for the schools in Wester Ross. He received his first lessons from his father, who was also a noted player, and continued to receive tuition from him throughout his career.

He joined the Queen's Own Highlanders cadets aged 13, and then joined the army to become a full time soldier in 1980. His service took him around the world in both his Piping and Infantry soldiers roles. Studying under Pipe Major John Allan at Edinburgh Castle, he gained a distinguished pass on the Pipe Major's course in 1986 where he achieved the Graduate certificate and the Senior Teachers certificate from the Institute of Piping. He also received tuition from Pipe Major Iain Morrison of the Queen's Own Highlanders and Captain Andrew Pitkeathly, formerly director of the Army School of Bagpipe Music.

He was made Pipe major of the regiment in 1992, and served in the role until the amalgamation of the Queen's Own Highlanders in 1994, making him the last Pipe major of the Queen's Own Highlanders. He then served as the first Pipe major of the amalgamated Highlanders for two years before moving to the Scottish Division, until he left the army in 1997 to teach piping at the Carnegie Mellon University Pipe Band.

As well as the Army and Carnegie Mellon University bands he led, Gillies played in a number of bands throughout his life, including the Ullapool & District Pipe Band which had been started by his father, the City of Glasgow Pipe Band, Spirit of Scotland Pipe Band and ScottishPower Pipe Band.

He died suddenly in 2011 in Ullapool, aged 47, after a period of ill health. With his wife Pauline he had one son, Norman, who is also a competitive piper.

== Musical style ==
Gillies was known for his technical ability, and mastery of March, Strathspey and Reel playing in particular.

== Solo prizes ==
Gillies had a successful career from an early age, placing highly in junior events in major competitions, and throughout his career he won almost every major trophy.

He has won both of the Highland Society of London Gold medals, at the Argyllshire Gathering in 1989 and at the Northern Meeting, for pibroch playing.

He has won the Former Winners March, Strathspey and Reel at the Northern Meeting a record 11 times, and won the overall competition at the Glenfiddich Championship 3 times, with 6 wins in the March, Strathspey and Reel event.
