= G. S. McLennan =

Pipe Major G. S. McLennan
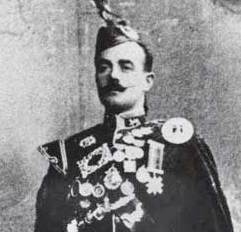
- Born: George Stewart McLennan; 9 February 1883; Edinburgh, Scotland
- Died: 31 May 1929 (aged 46); Aberdeen
- Military career
- Allegiance: United Kingdom
- Branch: British Army
- Service years: 1899–1922
- Unit: Gordon Highlanders
- Conflicts: First World War; Western Front

Pipe Major George Stewart McLennan (9 February 1883 – 31 May 1929) was a Scottish bagpipe player. He was a successful solo piper, as well as a pipe major and composer.

== Life ==
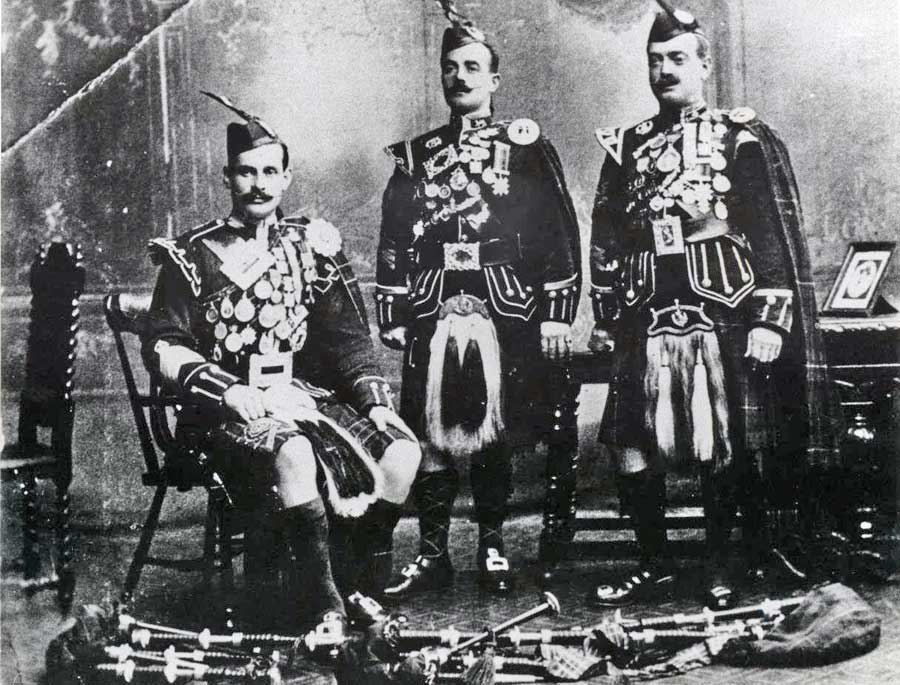
Willie Ross on the left, with G. S. McLennan in the middle and John Macdonald of Inverness on the right

He was born on 9 February 1883 at 105 St. Leonard Street, Edinburgh, to John and Elizabeth (née Stewart) McLennan, the eighth of their nine children (one of whom died in infancy). Many of his ancestors on both sides of the family were prominent pipers. George's father John was the first to use the spelling McLennan; his predecessors had used the spelling MacLennan.

George's mother Elizabeth died when he was young, and his father remarried a widow with two children and subsequently had three more children with her. Among his half-siblings was Gold Medal winner Donald Ross McLennan. George suffered from polio as a child, and could not walk until the age of four and a half.

McLennan began receiving piping tuition from his father at the age of four, and later received tuition from his uncle Pipe Major John Stewart, and in Highland dancing from his cousin William McLennan. He made rapid progression, winning the Amateur National Championship at the age of nine, and was invited by Queen Victoria to play for her at Balmoral Castle.

His father enlisted him in the Gordon Highlanders in October 1899 in order to prevent him from joining the Merchant Navy, and he became Pipe major of the 1st Battalion in 1905, one of the youngest ever in the British Army.

McLennan was successful in solo competitions, and won the Gold Medal at the Argyllshire Gathering in Oban in 1904 and at the Northern Meeting in Inverness in 1905, and the Clasp at Inverness for former winners of the Gold Medal in 1909, 1920 and 1921. McLennan had a close friendship and competitive rivalry with Willie Ross, and he travelled to competitions and shared prize money with William Lawrie.

He married Nona Lucking on 3 April 1912, and together they had two sons, George (1914–1996) and John (1916–1940), who both became pipers with the Gordon Highlanders.

McLennan was posted at the depot in Aberdeen until 1918, when he was sent to the Western Front to succeed Pipe Major Tom Henderson who had been killed. In May 1918 he collapsed and required fluid to be drained from his lungs in a field hospital. When the war ended he was posted back to Aberdeen, and after he was discharged in 1922 he started working in Aberdeen as a bagpipe maker, at a shop at 2 Bath Street. At the time there were several other prominent musicians in the city, including fiddler James Scott Skinner.

He died on 31 May 1929 of lung cancer after a long period of ill health connected to the makeshift operation. 20,000 people lined the route of the procession to Aberdeen station at his funeral on 4 June, before he was interred at Newington Cemetery in Edinburgh.

== Musical influence ==
G. S. McLennan was a composer of both pibroch and ceòl beag (light music). He inherited views on pibroch playing from his father, who had written two books on the subject. John was critical of the style espoused by the newly formed Piobaireachd Society, and believed it to be too slow and rhythmically loose. G. S. McLennan would step in time to pibroch as he played, which is not normally done. He also significantly developed the style of light music with his compositions, making it more varied and technically demanding.

His technical ability was extraordinary, and it is said that his fingers could be heard distinctly on the chanter when he played. Donald MacLeod described McLennan as "the most complete piper of this century".

Many of his compositions are widely played today, and include

- The Jig of Slurs
- Mrs MacPherson of Inveran
- The Little Cascade
- Inveran
- Dancing Feet
- Biddy from Sligo
- Alick C. MacGregor
- The Braes of Castle Grant
- Dalnahassaig
- Kilworth Hills
