= Faye Henderson =

- Born: Kirriemuir, Angus, Scotland
- Instrument: Bagpipes

Faye Henderson is a bagpipe player from Scotland. In 2010, she became one of the youngest ever winners of a Highland Society of London Gold Medal, as well as the first ever female winner.

== Life ==
Henderson was born in Kirriemuir, Angus, to parents who are both prominent solo players.

Her father Murray Henderson is one of the most successful solo competitors of all time, and has won the clasp (for former winners) at the Northern Meeting six times, in four different decades. He has also won the Bratach Gorm five times, and the Glenfiddich Piping Championship four times.

Faye's mother Patricia Henderson has placed in Gold Medal competitions, and was among the first women to break into the male-dominated piping scene.

Henderson received lessons from an early age from both her parents, and was a successful solo competitor from a young age. Her sister Fiona is an accomplished fiddler, having also competed at the Glennfiddich Championships for fiddling.

She plays Strathmore bagpipes, designed by her father.

== Solo career ==
In 2010, won the Highland Society of London Gold Medal at the Argyllshire Gathering in Oban, becoming the first woman to win the award either in Oban or at the Northern Meeting in Inverness. Aged 18, she also became one of the youngest ever winners of a gold medal, playing "Lament for Donald Duaghal MacKay". The youngest winner in history is John D. Burgess who won both Gold medals aged 16, but a lower age limit put in place on competitors means that this record cannot currently be broken.

By winning the gold medal, she became the first woman to qualify for the Glenfiddich Piping Championship in 20 years, since Amy Garson became the first woman to play at the event in 1988. Henderson also became the youngest ever competitor in the history of the competition.
