= Hal Senyk =

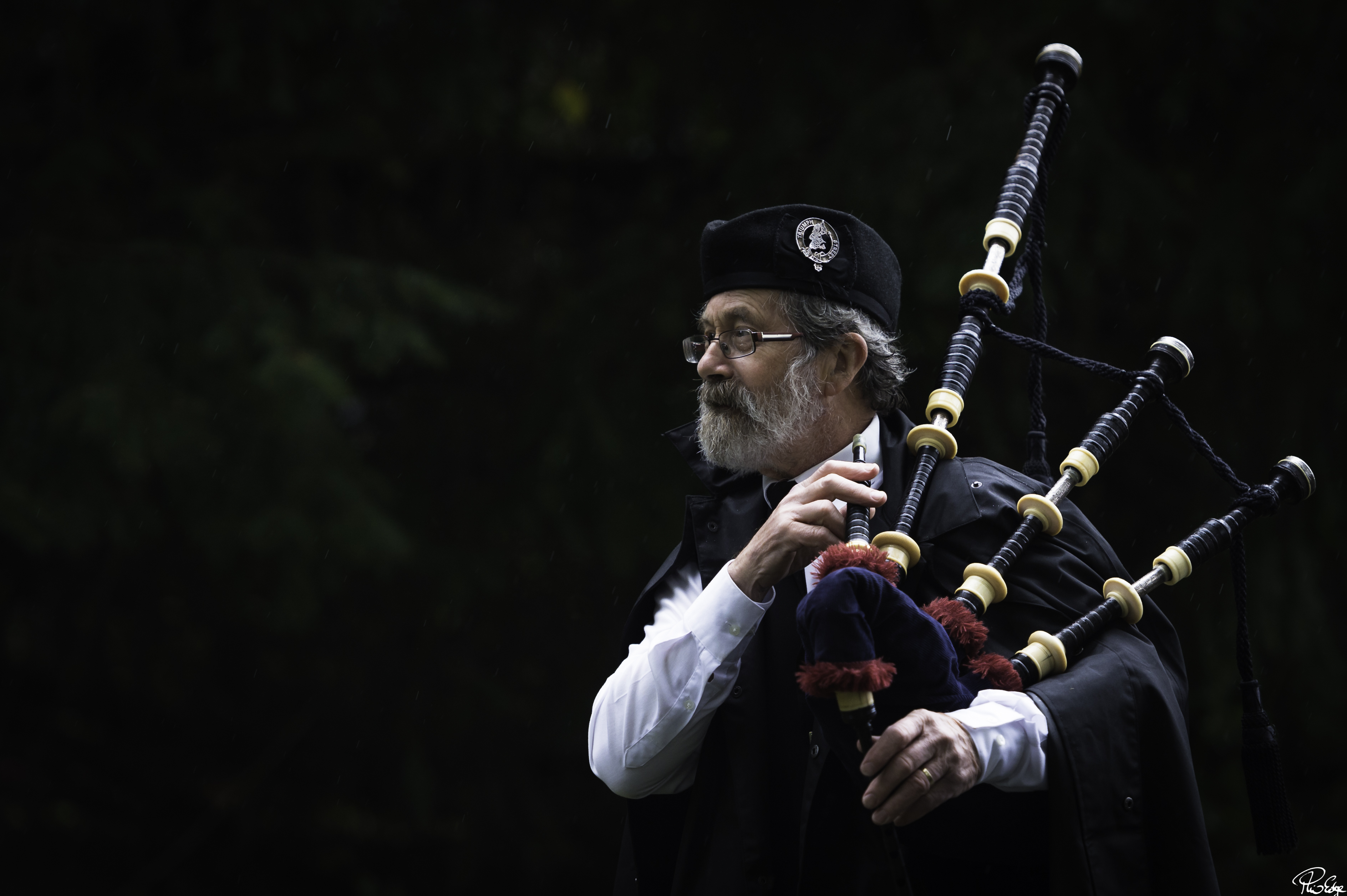
- Hal Senyk in 2021

Background information
- Born: March 4, 1950 (age 76); Winnipeg, Manitoba, Canada
- Occupation: Retired Lawyer
- Instrument: Bagpipes

Hal Senyk (born 4 March 1950) is a Canadian bagpiper and former pipe major of the Triumph Street Pipe Band.

== Biography ==
Born in Winnipeg, Manitoba, he has Scottish heritage through his mother's side of the family and Ukrainian heritage through his father's. His family relocated to Montreal, Quebec in the late 1950s. He was originally a highland dancer, but he began playing the bagpipes at the age of 10. After his family moved to Victoria, British Columbia in 1963, Senyk joined the Canadian Scottish Cadets. In the late 1960s, Senyk began playing in local piping competitions and attending the piping school in Coeur d'Alene, Idaho, where he received instruction from the legendary Bob Hardie, pipe major of the multiple-time world champion Muirhead & Sons Pipe Band. In 1971, Senyk won a trip to Scotland as a prize from the professional piping competition held at the Coeur d'Alene school. While in Scotland, Bob Hardie offered him a spot in the Muirhead & Sons Pipe Band, where he would play for a year. Senyk worked as a labourer at the Muirhead & Sons lumber mill during his time living in Scotland.

In 1972, Senyk was asked to take over as pipe major of the newly-formed Triumph Street Pipe Band based in Vancouver, British Columbia. Under his leadership, the band became one of the world's best Grade 1 pipe bands, placing 4th at the European Championships in 1976 (their first time competing in Scotland) and culminating in their historic 5th-place result and best drum corps prize at the 1979 World Pipe Band Championships in Nottingham, England. Senyk served as the band's pipe major from 1972 to 1983, followed by a second stint as pipe major from 1988 to 1991. After his time in Triumph Street, he played with the Abbotsford Police Pipe Band and the Maple Ridge Pipe Band.

On top of being an accomplished pipe major and band player, Senyk is an accomplished soloist. Notably, he was the first Canadian to win a major prize in Scotland, winning the March in Inverness in 1972. He's also a two-time winner (1975 and 1976) of the MacCrimmon Cairn at the BC Pipers' Association Annual Gathering. Senyk is a long-time senior adjudicator for the BCPA.

Senyk was gold medalist Bruce Gandy's first teacher. Since the early 2000s, he has been teaching the White Spot Pipe Band in Surrey, British Columbia. In 2011, Senyk was awarded a Life Membership by the BC Pipers' Association.
