= Bruce Gandy =

Canadian bagpipe player and composer (born 1962)

- Born: August 10, 1962 (age 62); Victoria, British Columbia
- Instrument: Bagpipes
- Website: www.brucegandymusic.com

Bruce Gandy (born August 10, 1962) is a Canadian bagpipe player and composer.

== Life ==
He was born on 10 August 1962 in Victoria, British Columbia, to Frances and Ray Gandy, and was the last of their eight children.

In 1982, Gandy met his wife Beverley Rollo, a piper in the 78th Fraser Highlanders, with whom he has had two sons, Alex and Fraser. Alex Gandy is the current pipe major of the 78th Highlanders (Halifax Citadel) Pipe Band, and has previously played with Field Marshal Montgomery Pipe Band.

== Career ==
Gandy joined the City of Victoria Pipe Band under pipe major James Troy at the age of 12 in 1974, and played with the band for eight years.

In 1982, he joined the nascent 78th Fraser Highlanders Pipe Band under pipe major Bill Livingstone, and played with them for 15 years, including a World Championship win in 1987, when the 78th Fraser Highlanders became the first band based outside Scotland to win the title. He was later pipe sergeant of the band between 1995 and 1997. In late 1997, he moved from Ontario to Prince Edward Island, where he was an instructor at the College of Piping, and then three years later he moved to Halifax, and played with the 78th Highlanders (Halifax Citadel) Pipe Band.

He won the gold medal at the Northern Meeting in 2002, and in 2003 won the gold medal at the Argyllshire Gathering as well as the Bratach Gorm that year. He has also won the Metro Cup in New York six times, and came second in the Glenfiddich Championships in 2009 and 2014.

== Compositions ==
Gandy is also a prolific composer of tunes, and has published four collections of music.
