= Donald MacLeod (piper) =

Pipe Major Donald MacLeod MBE
- Born: 14 August 1916; Stornoway, Scotland
- Died: 29 June 1982 (aged 65)
- Military career
- Allegiance: United Kingdom
- Branch: British Army
- Unit: Seaforth Highlanders
- Conflicts: Second World War; France; Operation Cycle; Operation Plunder

Pipe Major Donald MacLeod MBE (14 August 1916 – 29 June 1982) was a Scottish bagpiper, British Army Pipe major, composer and bagpipe instructor.

== Life ==
Donald MacLeod ("Wee Donald") was born in Stornoway on the Isle of Lewis on 14 August 1916. Macleod was mentored and tutored by John Morrison, who took him to his first Northern Meeting. He was also tutored by Willie Ross, and every week for 27 years by John MacDonald of Inverness.

He joined the British Army in 1937, and went to France in 1940 with the 2nd Battalion of the Seaforth Highlanders in the British Expeditionary Force. Captured as a prisoner of war during the surrender at St. Valery-en-Caux, he escaped during the march to Germany and returned to France in 1944 as pipe major of the 7th Battalion of the Seaforth Highlanders.

After the war, he competed in solo competitions, and won the Gold Medal at the Northern Meeting in Inverness in 1947 and at the Argyllshire Gathering in Oban in 1954.

After leaving the British Army in 1963, MacLeod became a partner in Grainger and Campbell, a Glasgow bagpipe-manufacturing firm.

He was made Member of the Most Excellent Order of the British Empire (MBE) in 1978. With his wife Winnie he had two daughters, Susan and Fiona.

== Musical influence ==
MacLeod tutored several top players, including John Wilson, Iain MacDonald, and P/M Iain M Morrison. He regularly taught at summer schools in North America.

MacLeod's tutorial on pibroch contains 220 recordings in 21 volumes.

The P/M Donald MacLeod MBE Memorial Competition, instituted by Iain M Morrison, is an invitational piping competition held in his memory on the Isle of Lewis since 1994.

== Discography ==
- A Puckle Pipers
- Positively Piobaireachd
- Piper in the Nave

== Compositions ==
He published six volumes of light music and one of pibroch, and after his death Iain Macdonald compiled a further volume.

Among his light music compositions were tunes such as:

- Susan MacLeod
- Fiona MacLeod
- Glasgow City Police Pipers
- Crossing the Minch
- The Blackberry Bush

Some piobaireachd compositions tunes include:

- Cabar Feidh Gu Brath
- Queen Elizabeth the Second's Salute
- The Field of Gold
- Lament for the Iolaire
