= John MacDonald of Inverness =

John MacDonald
- Born: 26 July 1865; Glentruim
- Died: 6 June 1953 (aged 87); Inverness
- Instrument: Bagpipes

Pipe Major John MacDonald MBE (26 July 1865 - 6 June 1953) was a Scottish bagpipe player.

== Personal life ==
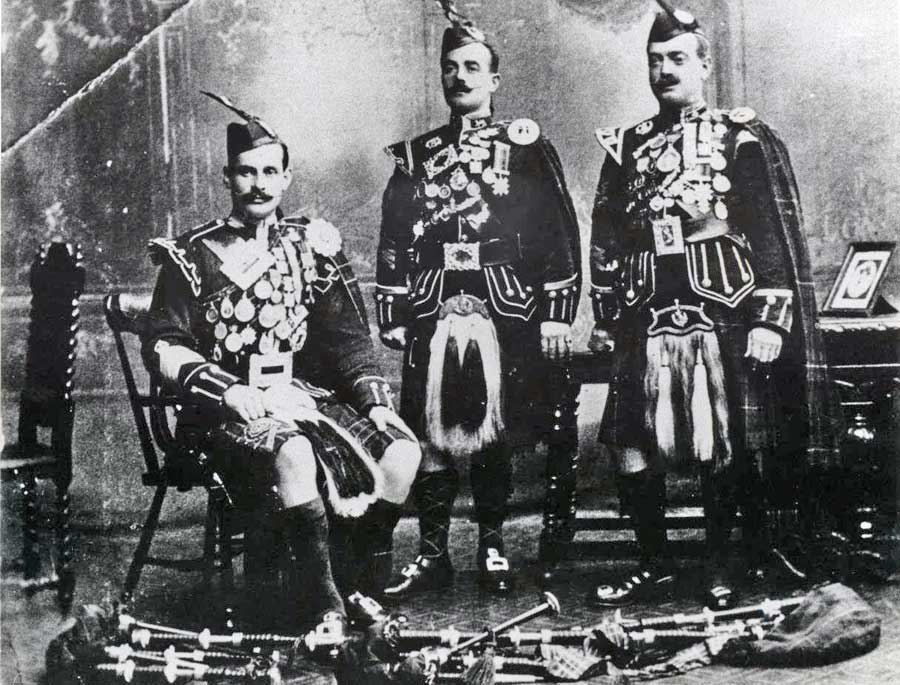
Willie Ross on the left, with G. S. McLennan in the middle and John MacDonald on the right

John MacDonald was born on 26 July 1865 at Glentruim, near Kingussie in Scotland, to Alexander Macdonald and Jane Lamond, who had married in 1861. He was the third of nine or possibly ten children.

John was first taught by his father, who was an accomplished player and Piper to MacPherson of Glentruim, and his uncles William and Duncan. Later he was taught by Malcolm Macpherson.

After leaving school he was employed as a gamekeeper, until in 1899 he joined the 1st Volunteer Battalion of the Cameron Highlanders as a Pipe major in a part-time role, and moved to Inverness. He gave lessons around Scotland arranged by the Piobaireachd Society, and in from 1910 became involved in formal Army teaching with the Army School of Bagpipe Music and Highland Drumming. For much of his life he worked as a travelling whisky salesman, a job he held at various intervals until 1947.

When the First World War broke out he volunteered for active service but was not accepted. On 9 January 1917 he married Christina Dick Todd, but she died in August 1919, and in 1923 he married Helen Gibb, who was a widow. Helen died in 1932, and they had no children.

Macdonald received an MBE in the 1932 New Year Honours. He died on 6 June 1953 in Inverness, and was buried in Forres.

== Musical career ==
In 1890 he won the Gold Medal at the Northern Meeting in Inverness, playing the King's Taxes. In 1897 he won the Gold Medal at the Argyllshire Gathering in Oban.

Having won both Gold Medals he was eligible to compete in the Clasp competition at Inverness, which he won in 1903, 1908. 1924, 1927, 1929, 1933, and 1934. He also won the Senior Piobaireachd at Oban nine times.

He taught many top pipers including Donald Macleod, who he gave weekly lessons to for 27 years, and Robert Nicol.
