= Glenfiddich Piping and Fiddle Championships =

Prestigious annual traditional music competition

Glenfiddich Piping Championship
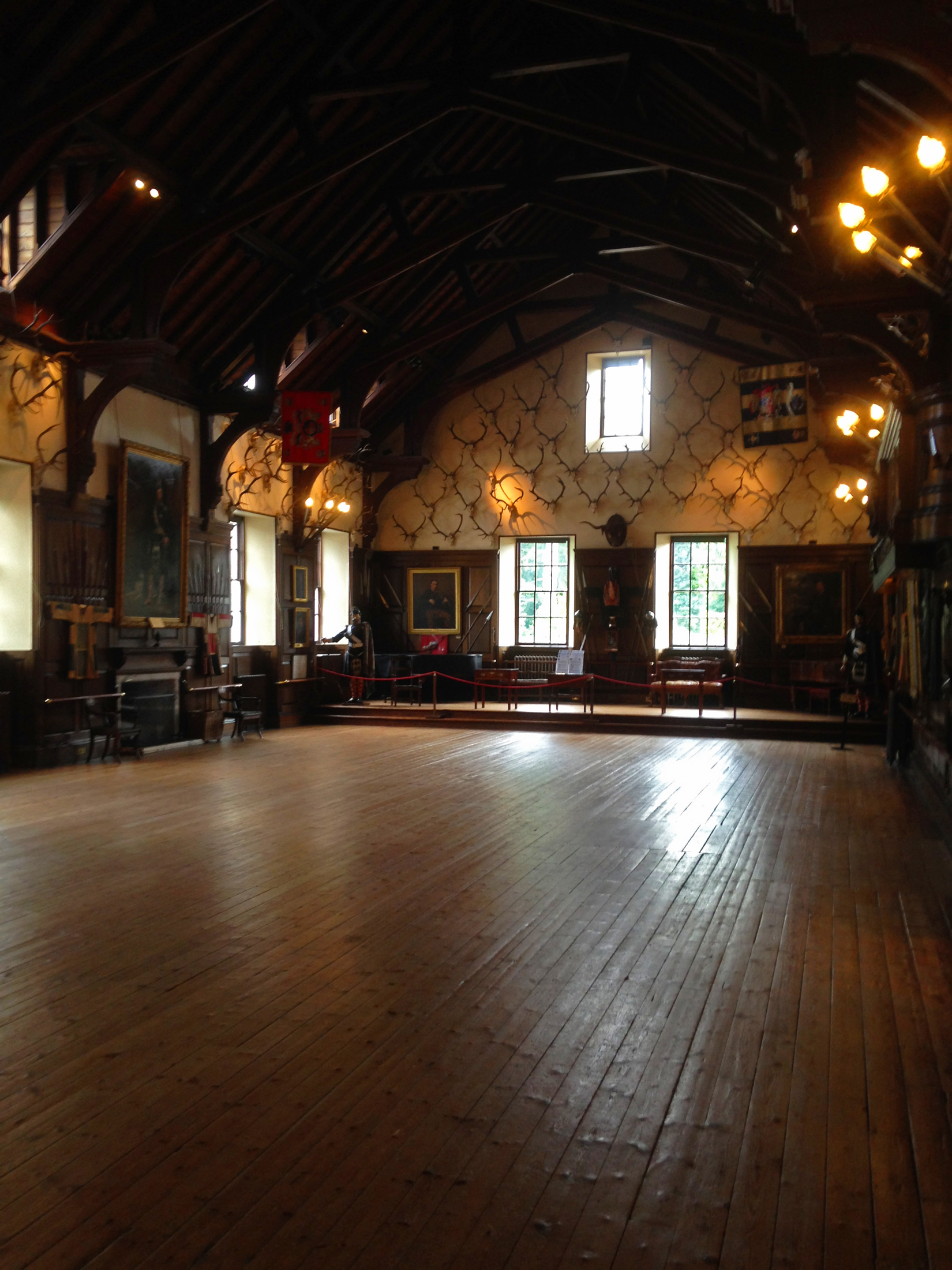
- Ballroom at Blair Castle
- Genre: Piping competition
- Frequency: Annually
- Locations: Blair Castle, Blair Atholl
- Years active: 1974–present
- Current Champion: Stuart Liddell MBE
- Sponsor: William Grant & Sons, The National Piping Centre
- Website: https://www.glenfiddich.com/uk/explore/latest-events/glenfiddich-piping-championship/

The Glenfiddich Piping and Fiddle Championships are musical competitions for the bagpipes and fiddle. Both competitions take place annually in late autumn, at the ballroom of Blair Castle at Blair Atholl in Perthshire, Scotland. Entry to each championship is by invitation only, to those who have won various recognised major UK solo competitions held throughout the year.

In 2016, the Glenfiddich Fiddle Championship was discontinued.

== The Glenfiddich Piping Championship ==
The Glenfiddich Piping Championship was established in 1974, as the Grant's Piping Championship, to inspire and stimulate individual pipers, and to seek the best overall exponents of the Ceòl Mór or piobaireachd (the great music) and Ceòl Beag (the little music).

The championship was founded and continues to be run by William Grant & Sons., distillers of Glenfiddich and other whiskies.

Ten of the leading pipers in the world, all of whom will have won important awards since the previous October, are invited. Each of them submits a list of six piobaireachds, and is required to play one of them. They also submit lists of six marches, strathspeys and reels, and play one of each, twice through.

=== Qualifying Events ===
Competitors gain an invitation to the Glenfiddich Championship by winning one of the following events:

- The previous year's Overall Glenfiddich Championship
- The Former Winner's Clasp at the Northern Meeting
- The Senior Piobaireachd at the Argyllshire Gathering
- The Former Winner's MSR at the Northern Meeting
- The Former Winner's MSR at the Argyllshire Gathering
- The Master's Solo Piping Competition
- The Overall Winner at the Scottish Piping Society of London Annual Competition
- The Bratach Gorm at the Scottish Piping Society of London Annual Competition
- The Highland Society of London Gold Medal at the Northern Meeting
- The Highland Society of London Gold Medal at the Argyllshire Gathering

In the event that an individual wins more than one of these events, 2nd or 3rd place prize-winners from the event are invited, with the exception of the Gold Medal competitions.

There are prizes in each discipline, and an overall championship prize.

=== Previous championships ===
Previous Glenfiddich Piping Championship Winners from the last 50 years:

Glenfiddich Piping Championship Winners
Year	Winner	Location/Regiment	Notable achievements
2026	Alasdair Henderson	Dunoon	1st Win
2025	Stuart Liddell MBE	Inveraray	4th Win
2024	Callum Beaumont	St Andrews	2nd Win
2023	Callum Beaumont	Dollar	
2022	William McCallum	Bearsden	9th Win, Record 11th MSR Win
2021	Jack Lee	Canada	3rd Win, William McCallum 10th MSR Win
2020	Stuart Liddell	Inveraray	3rd Win, William McCallum 9th MSR Win
2019	Finlay Johnston		2nd Win
2018	Finlay Johnston	Milngavie	
2017	Jack Lee	Canada	2nd Win
2016	Roderick J. MacLeod	Glasgow	5th Win, Record 10th Piobaireachd Win, William McCallum 8th MSR Win
2015	Angus MacColl	Benderloch	4th Win
2014	Stuart Liddell	Inveraray	2nd Win
2013	Iain Speirs	Edinburgh	2nd Win
2012	Iain Speirs	Edinburgh	
2011	Roderick J. MacLeod	Glasgow	4th Win
2010	Angus MacColl	Benderloch	3rd Win
2009	Stuart Liddell	Inveraray	
2008	Gordon Walker	Galston	2nd Win
2007	Gordon Walker	Galston	
2006	Angus MacColl	Benderloch	2nd Win
2005	William McCallum	Bearsden	8th Win (McCallum wins both individual events)
2004	William McCallum	Bearsden	7th Win (McCallum wins both individual events)
2003	Jack Lee	Canada	1st Piper from North America to win
2002	Roderick J. MacLeod	Cumbernauld	3rd Win
2001	William McCallum	Bearsden	6th Win
2000	William McCallum	Bearsden	5th Win
1999	William McCallum	Bearsden	4th Win
1998	Alasdair Gillies	Pittsburgh	3rd Win
1997	Roderick J. MacLeod	Cumbernauld	2nd Win
1996	Pipe Major Alasdair Gillies	Pittsburgh	2nd Win
1995	Angus MacColl	Oban	
1994	William McCallum	Glasgow	3rd Win
1993	William McCallum	Glasgow	2nd Win
1992	Roderick J. MacLeod	Cumbernauld	
1991	Pipe Sergeant Alasdair Gillies	Queen's Own Highlanders	
1990	William McCallum	Glasgow	
1989	Murray Henderson	Eassie	4th Win (Henderson wins both individual events)
1988	Pipe Major Gavin Stoddart	Royal Highland Fusiliers	2nd Win
1987	Murray Henderson	Eassie	3rd Win
1986	Iain MacFadyen	Kyle of Lochalsh	4th Win
1985	Murray Henderson	Eassie	2nd Win
1984	Iain MacFadyen	Kyle of Lochalsh	3rd Win
1983	Pipe Major Gavin Stoddart	Royal Highland Fusiliers	(Stoddart wins both individual events)
1982	Pipe Major Angus MacDonald	Scots Guards	2nd Win (MacDonald wins both individual events)
1981	Iain MacFadyen	Kyle of Lochalsh	2nd Win
1980	Pipe Major Iain Morrison	Queens Own Highlanders	
1979	Murray Henderson	Eassie	
1978	Hugh MacCallum	Stirling	
1977	Iain MacFadyen	Kyle of Lochalsh	
1976	Pipe Major Angus MacDonald	Scots Guards	
1975	Pipe Major John D. Burgess	Alness	
1974	James McIntosh	Dundee	Inaugural competition

== The Glenfiddich Fiddle Championship ==
Glenfiddich Fiddle Championship
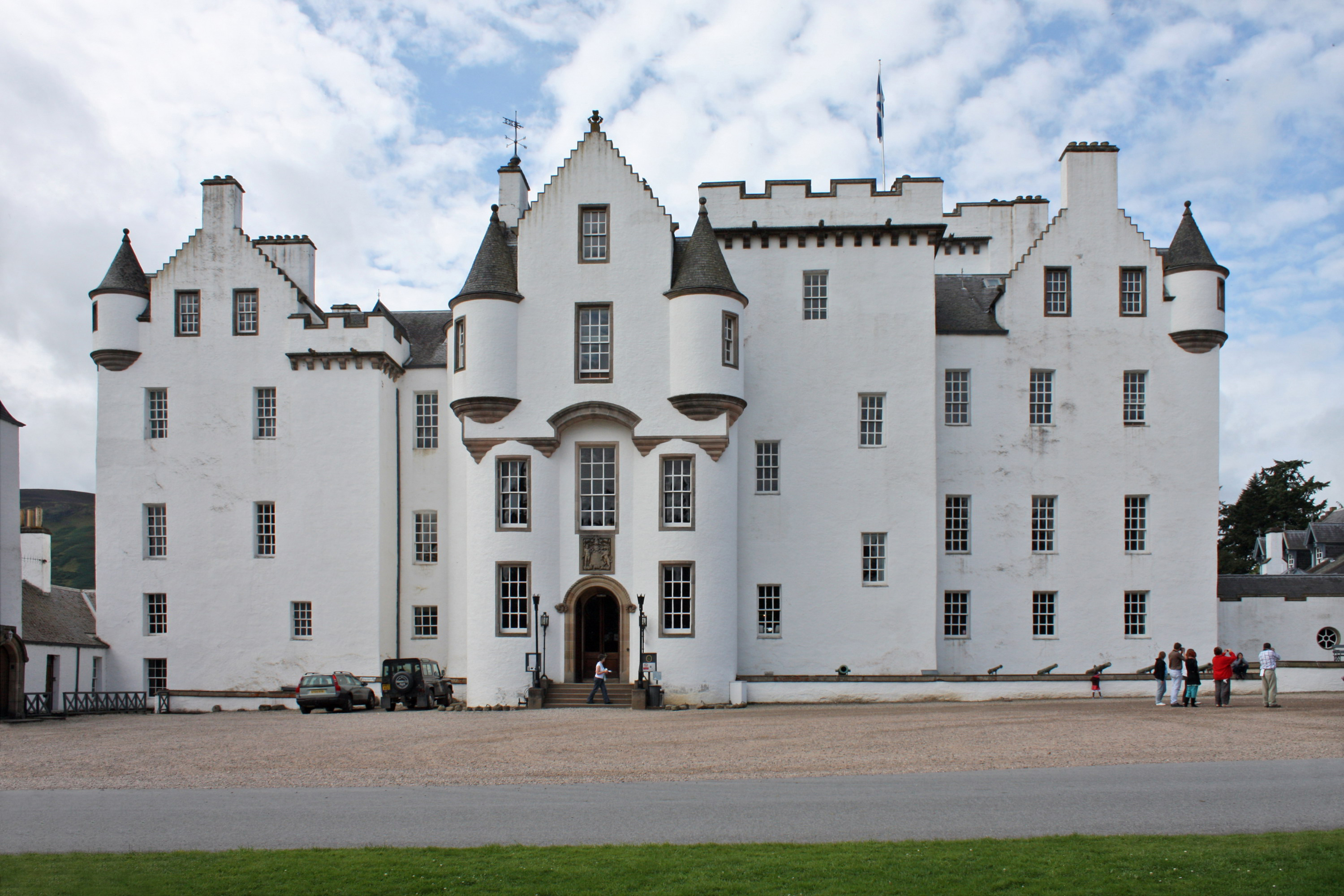
- Blair Castle
- Genre: Fiddle competition
- Frequency: Annually
- Locations: Blair Castle, Blair Atholl
- Years active: 1984–2016
- Sponsor: William Grant & Sons
- Website: https://www.glenfiddich.com/uk/explore/latest-events/glenfiddich-fiddle-championship/

The Glenfiddich Fiddle Championship was added in 1989 to the existing Glenfiddich Piping Championships – to reward, encourage and perpetuate the art of fiddle playing throughout the world.

Eight finalists are hand selected to compete following successes throughout the year, with each finalist giving a recital incorporating all the various styles of composition including a set of tunes by a specific composer – a new composer is chosen annually.

In 2016, the Glenfiddich Fiddle Championship was discontinued. A celebratory non-competitive event was held at Blair Castle in which all previous champions were invited to perform.

=== 2015 Championship ===
The Glenfiddich Fiddle Championship 2015 was won by George Davidson of Tarves in Aberdeenshire. Second place went to Maggie Adamson of Fladdabister, Shetland, and third place went to Mari Black of Boston, Massachusetts, USA.

=== 2014 Championship ===
The Glenfiddich Fiddle Championship 2014 was won by Mari Black of Boston, Massachusetts, USA. Second place went to George Davidson of Tarves in Aberdeenshire, and third place went to Maura Shawn Scanlin of Boone, North Carolina, USA.

=== 2012 Championship ===
The Glenfiddich Fiddle Championship 2012 was won by Maggie Adamson from Shetland. Second place went to Erin Smith of Aberdeen, and third place went to Ronald Jappy of Findochty.

=== Previous championships ===
Glenfiddich Fiddle Championships Winners
Year	Winner
2015	George Davidson
2014	Mari Black
2013	Maura Shawn Scanlin
2012	Maggie Adamson
2011	Maggie Adamson
2010	Nicola Auchnie
2009	Rebecca Lomnicky
2008	Raemond Jappy
2007	Calum Pasqua
2006	Gemma Donald
2005	Sarah Naylor
2004	Ross Thomson
2003	Stephen Cordiner
2002	Ruaridh Campbell
2001	Gillian Risi
2000	Gillian Risi
1999	Patsy Reid
1998	Patsy Reid
1997	Russell Kostulin
1996	Russell Kostulin
1995	Paul Anderson
1994	Keith Anderson
1993	Kathryn Nicoll
1992	Maureen Turnbull
1991	Maureen Turnbull
1990	Maureen Turnbull
