= William Lawrie =

- Born: 1881 Ballachulish, Argyll, Scotland
- Died: 28 November 1916 (age 35) Third Southern General Hospital, Oxford
- Instrument: Bagpipes

William Lawrie (1881–1916) was a Scottish bagpipe player, who was both an eminent solo competitor and a composer.

== Life ==
He was born in 1881, into a slate quarrying family in Ballachulish, Argyll and was the son of Hugh Lawrie (Eòghann Thomais Uilleam), who gave him his first lessons on the Great Highland bagpipes at the age of seven. He later received lessons from John MacColl of Oban.

In 1910 he became the second piper ever to win the gold medals at the Northern Meeting and Argyllshire Gathering in the same year. He was a friend and contemporary of G. S. McLennan, and they travelled to competitions together and shared prize money.

Lawrie spent some time as piper to the Earl of Dunmore, and also as piper to the Colonel MacDougall of Lunga.

In 1914 he became Pipe Major of the 8th Argyllshire Battalion of the Argyll and Sutherland Highlanders and served with them in France from 1915 to 1916 when he became ill as a result of trench conditions. He was invalided to England where he died, on 28 November 1916, in the Third Southern General Hospital in Oxford, possibly as a result of contracting pneumonia and pleurisy in the trenches and then meningitis after being admitted to hospital. He left behind his wife Una and three children, who were all aged under five when he died. A 'marbhrann' (Gaelic lament) was written upon his death by the Islay bard Duncan Johnston who was a close personal friend.

His bagpipes are now on display in the Argyll and Sutherland Highlanders Regimental Museum in Stirling Castle, along with his service medals and the Gold Medals he won at Oban and Inverness.

== Compositions ==
He is remembered as a composer for the bagpipes although only around twenty of his tunes survive. Some of his compositions are:

- The Pap of Glencoe
- The Battle of the Somme – included on the 1976 album Battle of the Field
- Inveraray Castle
- Captain Carswell
