= Red Hot Highland Fling =

Annual New Year's Eve concert in Inverness, Scotland

The Red Hot Highland Fling, founded in 2008, is a free Hogmanay (New Year's Eve) concert, held annually in Northern Meeting Park Arena Inverness in the Scottish Highlands. Organised by the Highland Council, the event is sponsored by the Inverness Common Good Fund and is the climax of the Inverness Winter Festival.

== Northern Meeting Park Arena ==
Northern Meeting Park Arena is a combination of the Highland Council HQ Car Park (where the concert takes place) and the world's oldest Highland Games stadium, Northern Meeting Park, which is located next door and houses the fireworks display to signal the arrival of the New Year at midnight.

== Event format ==
After experimenting with a 3, 4 and 5 band model between 2008 and 2012; the Red Hot Highland Fling moved to a 3 band model with effect in 2013. The gates open at 20:00 and the show starts at 20:30. The show ends at 00.30 after the final band returns for a post Fireworks Display encore.

The event normally attracts between 9000 - 11,000, but in 2019 the show attracted a capacity crowd of 15,000 making it the biggest Hogmanay concert staged in Scotland. The Edinburgh Hogmanay concert in the Gardens has a capacity of 10,000.

- 2008 Shutter, Low Tide Revelry, Single Malt System, The Magic Numbers & Albanach
- 2009 Show cancelled due to snow blizzard. The bands that were due to appear all appeared the following year
- 2010 Blazin Fiddles, The Red Hot Chilli Pipers and Peatbog Fairies
- 2011 Hoodja, Bags of Rock, Wolfstone and Skerryvore
- 2012 Whisky River Band, The Treacherous Orchestra, Big Country and Skerryvore
- 2013 Dorec - a - Belle, The Red Hot Chilli Pipers and Skerryvore
- 2014 Manran, The Julie Fowlis Band and The Red Hot Chilli Pipers
- 2015 Breabach, Capercaille and Skerryvore
- 2016 The Elephant Sessions, Scooty and the Skyhooks and Skerryvore
- 2017 Ho-Ro, Skipinnish and Skerryvore
- 2018 Calum Mackenzie Jones & The Trad Project, Blazin Fiddles & Tide Lines
- 2019 Dorec-a-Belle, Skipinnish and Torridon
