= Jim Crumley =

Jim Crumley may refer to:

- James Crumley (footballer)
- James Crumley, American author
- Jim Crumley (Scottish author)
