= Angus MacColl =

Scottish bagpipe player

Angus Duncan MacColl
- Born: 1967; Benderloch
- Instrument: Bagpipes

Angus D. MacColl is a Scottish bagpipe player.

== Life ==
He was born in Benderloch, near Oban, and initially learnt the pipes from his father. MacColl is descended from a number of famous pipers, including John MacColl. His son Angus J. MacColl is also a competitive piper.

He teaches at the Oban High School.

== Career ==
MacColl won gold medals at both the Northern Meeting and Argyllshire Gathering. He also won the former winners Clasp at the Northern Meeting, several Ceòl Beag prizes, and the Metro Cup, in 2012. Additionally, he won the Glenfiddich Championships four times, in 1995, 2006, 2010 and 2015.

He played with the Spirit of Scotland Pipe Band when it formed in 2008 and 2016.
