= Cynthia Rogerson =

American-born writer

Cynthia Rogerson (born 14 August 1953) is an American-born writer of mainstream literary fiction set in Scotland and California. Originally from California, she now lives in the Scottish Highlands.

== Novels and short story collections ==
- Upstairs in the Tent - Headline Review (2000)
- Love Letters from my Deathbed - Two Ravens Press (2007)
- I Love You, Goodbye - Black and White (2011). Shortlisted for Creative Scotland Book of the Year Award 2010
- Stepping Out and Other Stories - Salt (2010)
- If I Touched the Earth - Black and White (2012)
- Wait for Me Jack - Sandstone (2017, as Addison Jones)

== Awards ==
- V.S. Pritchett Prize 2008
- Best Scottish Novel 2011 (shortlisted)
- Highland Book Prize 2022 (shortlisted)

== Work ==
Rogerson is program director at Moniack Mhor Writers Centre, as well as a Royal Literary Fellow in Dundee and a manuscript assessor for The Literary Consultancy.
