= Murray Henderson =

Murray Henderson may refer to:

- Murray Henderson (footballer) (born 1980), Scottish football defender
- Murray Henderson (ice hockey) (1921–2013), Canadian ice hockey defenceman
- Murray Henderson (piper), bagpipe player
- Murray Henderson (rugby union) (born 1959), rugby union coach and former player from New Zealand
- M. R. Henderson (Murray Ross Henderson, 1899–1982), Scottish botanist
