= Murray Henderson (piper) =

- Born: Timaru
- Instrument: Bagpipes

Murray Henderson is a bagpipe player and reed-maker from Scotland.

== Life ==
Murray was born in Timaru in New Zealand, and moved to Scotland in 1973. He initially learned to play the pipes from his father.

His wife Patricia is also an accomplished piper, having placed in Gold Medal competitions, and his daughter Faye Henderson is also a Gold Medal winner.

== Career ==
Henderson has won the gold medals at the Argyllshire Gathering and the Northern Meeting, and has won the clasp (for former winners) at the Northern Meeting six times, in four different decades. He has also won the Bratach Gorm five times, and the Glenfiddich Piping Championship four times.
