= Triumph Street Pipe Band =

Canadian pipe band

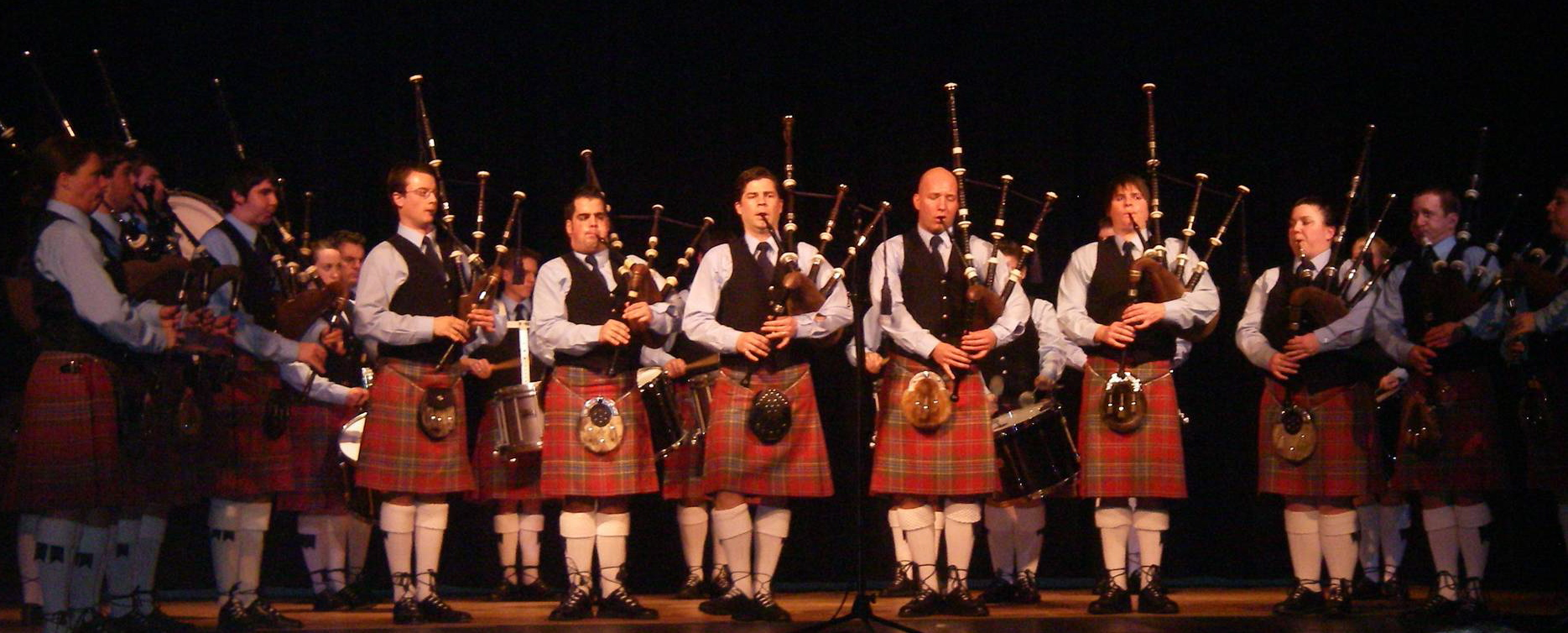
- Established: 1971
- Disbanded: September 16, 2018
- Location: Vancouver, British Columbia, Canada
- Grade: 1
- Tartan: MacLean of Duart Weathered
- Website: www.triumphstreetpipeband.com

The Triumph Street Pipe Band was a Grade 1 competitive and concert pipe band based in Greater Vancouver, British Columbia, Canada, established in 1971 by former pupils of Pipe Major Malcolm Nicholson, C.M. of the Vancouver Police Pipe Band. The band was dissolved on September 16, 2018, by Pipe Major David Hilder.

== History ==
In the 1970s and early 1980s, the band ranked among the best in the world, and under the leadership of Pipe Major Hal Senyk and Lead Drummer Willie McErlean, Triumph Street placed 5th in Grade 1 at the 1979 World Pipe Band Championships. This achievement was the first time that a band from outside Scotland had won a major prize at the World's, in this case 'The Sash' for best drum corps. The band placed 6th in the Medley contest at the 2011 World's, finishing 9th overall.

Led by Pipe Major David Hilder and Lead Drummer Andre Tessier, the Robert Malcolm Memorial Pipe Band won the World Pipe Band Championship title in Grade 2 in a field of 39 bands. Robert Malcolm Memorial Grade 2 was folded after the World Championships in 2006, and was reformed with the name Triumph Street in January 2007, taking over the old Triumph Street Pipe Band Society, which hadn't fielded a pipe band in around a decade. The band membership was roughly the same, led by David and Shaunna Hilder and Drum Sergeant Andre Tessier. The band competed in Grade 2 for one year, before being promoted to Grade 1 after winning the North American Championships in August 2007. The band adopted the name Dowco in honour of the generous financial sponsorship of the Dowco Group of Companies. Notably, the band placed 6th in the Medley contest at the 2011 World's, finishing 9th overall.

On September 16, 2018, PM David Hilder announced that DTSPB would be disbanded. He cited monetary issues, as the 10-year corporate contract with the Dowco group of companies ended.

== Pipe Majors ==
- Sandy Marshall (1971–1972)
- Hal Senyk (1972–1983)
- Rob Menzies (1983–1988)
- Hal Senyk (1988–1991)
- Alan Walters (1991–1995)
- David Hilder (2007–2018)

== Leading Drummers ==
- Willie McErlean (1971–1981)
- Scott Robertson (1981–1990)
- Tim Gladden (1990–1991)
- Gregor Merry (1991–1995)
- John Paul Da Silva (1996 - 1997)
- Bill Saul (1997-1999)
- Andre Tessier (2007–2013)
- Peter Hendrickson (2013–2015)
- Cameron Reid (2015–2016)
- Gary Corkin (2016–2018)

== Discography ==
- The Bagpipe In Canada
- A Dram Before Ya Go! (1986)
- With Purpose (2012)
