= Donald S. Murray =

Scottish novelist and poet

- Education: MA (Joint Hons) at University of Glasgow
- Occupations: Novelist, poet, playwright
- Notable work: For the Safety of All As the Women Lay Dreaming
- Awards: Paul Torday Memorial Prize (2020)
- Website: https://www.donaldsmurray.co.uk/

Donald S. Murray (born 1956) is a Scottish novelist, poet, and playwright. He has written several non-fiction books, including For the Safety of All and In a Veil of Mist, novels, poetry, music, and a play. He was awarded the 2020 Paul Torday Memorial Prize. In March 2022, he was a Scottish Books International featured writer.

== Early life ==
Murray spent his formative years on the Isle of Lewis, part of the Outer Hebrides. He lived in the village of South Dell within the district of Ness.

After attending the Nicolson Institute in Stornoway, Murray left the island to study English and Scottish Literature at the University of Glasgow. After graduating with an MA (Joint Hs) he gained a Diploma in Education and embarked on a teaching career.

== Career ==
After three decades as an English teacher, Murray became a full-time writer in 2012. He now lives and works in Shetland.

His debut novel, As the Women Lay Dreaming, won the Paul Torday Memorial Prize in 2020 and was shortlisted for The Herald Scottish Culture Awards Outstanding Literature Award and the Authors' Club Best First Novel Award in 2019.

In total, Murray has written fourteen books and published essays, columns, short stories, and poems in the likes of The Herald, The Guardian, and The Island Review.

His writing, both of fiction and non-fiction, has received critical acclaim awards and appeared on shortlists and longlists for numerous literary prizes.

In 2015, Sequamur, Murray's first full-length Scottish Gaelic play, was performed across Scotland, including at the Edinburgh Festival, as well as in Belfast, London, and Ypres in Belgium.

Characterised as 'moving, powerful, with a message that resonates today,' it explored the effect of the First World War on The Nicolson Institute in Stornoway.

== Poetry ==
Murray has published several poetic works and was chosen as one of three Scottish poets to give a reading at COP 26 in Glasgow in October 2021. He appeared in the Green Zone along with fellow Scots poets, Roseanne Watt and Pàdraig MacAoidh, at "Weathering the Storm: Scottish Poets Discuss Climate Change Resilience and Adaptation."

Murray's poetry has been critically acclaimed in the Callum Macdonald Memorial Award, being shortlisted twice in 1997 before winning in 2021 with Achanalt, a poetry pamphlet, along with publishers, Roncadora Press.

== Bibliography ==
=== Music ===
Weaving Songs (2011)

=== Plays ===
Sequamur (2015)

=== Fiction novels ===
As the Women Lay Dreaming (2018)

In a Veil of Mist (2021)

The Call of the Cormorant (2022)

The Salt and the Flame (2024)

=== Non-fiction books ===
The Guga Hunters (2008)

Herring Tales: How the Silver Darlings Shaped Human Taste and History (2015)

The Dark Stuff: Stories from the Peatlands (2018)

For the Safety of All (2021)

In a Veil of Mist (2021)
