= Jim Crumley (Scottish author) =

Scottish author

Jim Crumley (born 1947) is a Scottish journalist, a former newspaper editor and a regular columnist for the Dundee Courier and The Scots Magazine. He is also the author of more than 40 books, mostly on the wildlife and wild landscapes of Scotland, many of them making the case for species reintroductions, or ‘rewilding’. His Seasons series, a quartet of books exploring wildlife and landscapes and how climate change is affecting our environment across the four seasons, is highly acclaimed. The Nature of Autumn was longlisted for the Wainwright Golden Beer Book Prize 2017 and shortlisted for the Richard Jefferies Society and White Horse Bookshop Literary Prize 2017. The Nature of Spring was BBC Radio 4’s Book of the Week. The Nature of Summer, published in 2020, was shortlisted for the 2021 Highland Book Prize. His most recent book, Lakeland Wild, is his first to focus entirely on an English landscape.

Crumley is also a poet, an occasional broadcaster on both radio and television and a frequent speaker at events and book festivals on nature, rewilding and conservation.

== Early life ==
Crumley was born in Dundee, Scotland. He began his career as a journalist, but towards the end of the 1980s, he decided, in the words of his then-boss, to “follow his star” and become a writer about the natural world. Although he is now predominantly a nature writer whose works focus on the Scottish landscape, his experience as a journalist and his uncompromising stance on the need for more species conservation both continue to inform his writing and its emphasis on close observation.

== Family life ==
Crumley is married and has a son and 2 daughters. His youngest daughter Heather is involved with writing and editing. His son, Euan Crumley, is a writer and sports journalist.

== Journalism career ==
Crumley started his journalism career at DC Thomson and went on to become the youngest editor in the Stirling Observer’s 150-year history. He worked for the Daily Express and Edinburgh Evening News before giving up his staff job at the age of 40 to become a freelance writer.

== Nature writing ==
Since his first book, Waters of the Wild Swan, was published in 1992, Crumley has written 40 books about the wildlife and natural landscapes of Scotland. His style has been described as a “mesmerising blend of observation and in-depth knowledge” which allows the reader to lose themselves in his writing. Not only does Crumley describe the beauty of the natural world, one review has described his books as a necessary insight into the role of humanity within a period of climate change and an example of the “wisdom that we need now, more than ever before”.

=== Seasons ===
Since 2016, Crumley has written a series of texts exploring the Scottish seasons, covering first autumn, winter, spring and finally summer. The quartet casts its net all over Scotland, stretching from Shetland and St Kilda to the heartlands and the Pentland Hills, and beyond, to northern Europe and the Americas. Crumley describes the variety of wildlife across the country, and sheds light on climate change and the role of humanity as an active agent within the environment.

==== The Nature of Autumn ====
Published in 2016, The Nature of Autumn was the first of the Seasons series. It was longlisted for the Wainwright Prize for nature writing and was recommended as one of the best nature books of the year by Stephen Moss in The Guardian. The book was commended for its blend of insightful knowledge and breath-taking description, making it a "cornucopia of autumnal delight".

==== The Nature of Winter ====
The second book of the series, The Nature of Winter, was noted as the “best nature writing currently arriving from north of the border". In the BBC Countryfile magazine, Julie Brominicks described Crumley's account as written with a "dazzling clarity, lyrical tilt and a story-teller’s skill". The book helped establish Crumley's position as Scotland's “foremost nature commentator”.

==== The Nature of Spring ====
The Nature of Spring, the third instalment of the series, was chosen as the BBC Radio 4 Book of the Week in April 2019. The book was described in the BBC Countryfile magazine as “remarkable” and a testimony to Crumley's capacity as a “fantastic writer”.

==== The Nature of Summer ====
Published in 2020, The Nature of Summer completed the Seasons series. It was short-listed for the 2021 Highland Book Prize, evidencing its attraction as a “work of pure escapism” and strength as “the perfect finale to this evocative seasonal collection”, in the words of Tiffany Francis-Baker written in the BBC Wildlife Magazine.

=== Lakeland Wild ===
Crumley's first book to be published on an English landscape, Lakeland Wild was published in 2021. He traces the Lake District’s place in the evolution of global conservation, considers the many commentators who have written on the area before, and pleads the case for a far-reaching reappraisal of all of Lakeland’s wildness at a time when both farming and ever more visitors are threatening its ecosystems. It was described by Mark Avery as “Intelligent and cultured, but not flowery or overblown” and that it has a “deeper message that nature should be the overriding priority in National Parks".

=== Encounters in the Wild ===
Each book in this open-ended series of short monographs describes Crumley's own encounters with birds and mammals native to the UK. These include the barn owl; the fox; the hare; the otter; the swan; the skylark; the badger and the kingfisher. The Barn Owl was described as “an utter delight” and an example of the “sheer beauty of descriptions of wildlife”.

== Books on species reintroductions ==
=== Nature’s Architect (2015) ===
In Nature’s Architect, his 2015 study of the beaver in Scotland, Crumley reveals how the beaver lives and breeds and considers the ecological and economic impact of beaver reintroductions. Crumley considers the future for Britain's beavers and makes the case for giving them their freedom despite their controversial status. It was described as a “must-read for anyone interested in the countryside and its future". In the words of Ken Lussey, Nature’s Architect offers a “beautifully written” and “superbly researched” study which addresses “the legitimate fears and concerns of landowners” whilst defending the importance of the beaver as an agent in the natural world, making it “a genuinely important book”.

=== The Eagle’s Way (2014) ===
This study focused on the reintroduced sea eagles in Scotland and observed how they interacted with golden eagles, establishing the existence of a kind of shared coast-to-coast highway used by both species between the Firth of Tay and Mull. The book was shortlisted for the Saltire Society’s Research Book of the Year in 2014.

=== The Last Wolf (2009) ===
This was the first book by a UK nature writer to make the case for reintroducing the wolf to UK shores.
