= Cory Pesaturo =

American musician

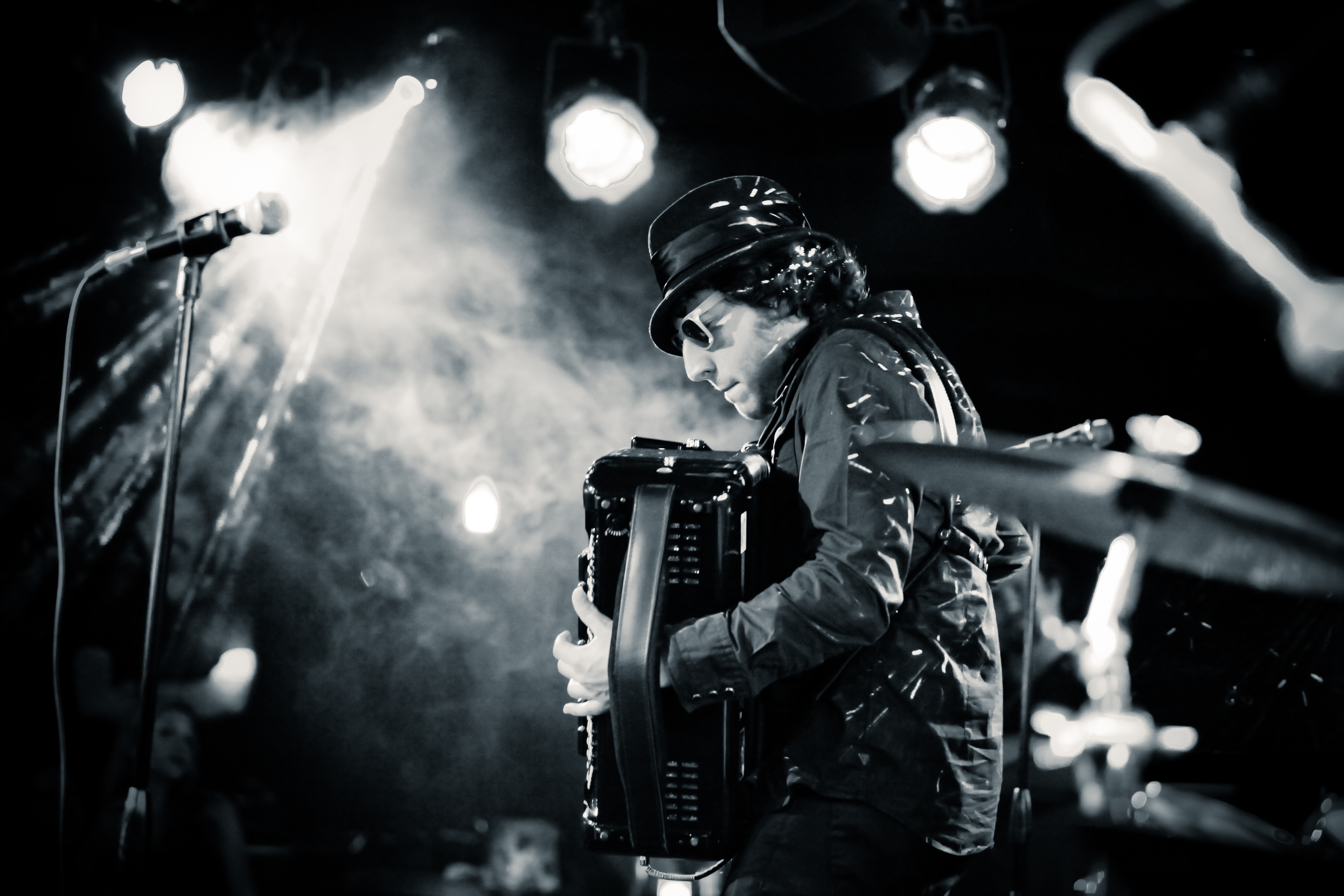
- At a Festival in 2012

Background information
- Origin: Rhode Island, United States
- Genres: Various
- Instruments: Accordion, Pianos, Clarinet, Saxophone
- Years active: 1996–present
- Website: www.CoryPesaturo.com

Medal record

Accordion Championships

National Championships
Gold medal – first place	2009 US National Accordion Championships	US Open Solo National Championships
Silver medal – second place	2004 US National Accordion Championships	US Open Solo National Championship
Gold medal – first place	2009 US National Accordion Championships	US Open Solo Digital Accordion Championship

World Championships
Gold medal – first place	2009 Coupe Mondiale World Accordion Championships	Digital Category
Gold medal – first place	2010 World Jazz Accordion Championships	Jazz Category
Gold medal – first place	2011 Primus Ikaalinen World Acoustic Accordion Championship	Primus Ikaalinen

Cory Pesaturo is an American multi-instrumentalist from Cumberland, Rhode Island, who plays the accordion, piano, clarinet, and saxophone. In 2002, Pesaturo became the youngest person to win the National Accordion Championship.

In 2009, Pesaturo won the Coupe Mondiale World Digital Accordion Championship in Auckland, New Zealand, and became the first American to win a World Accordion Championship since Peter Soave 25 years earlier. In 2011, Pesaturo won the Primus Ikaalinen World Acoustic Accordion Championship, as its first American contestant. In 2017, he broke the Guinness World Record for the longest continuous playing of the accordion, which was sponsored by Red Bull from his relationship with the Red Bull F1 Team. In 2009, Pesaturo won the Leavenworth International Championship and International Jazz Championship.

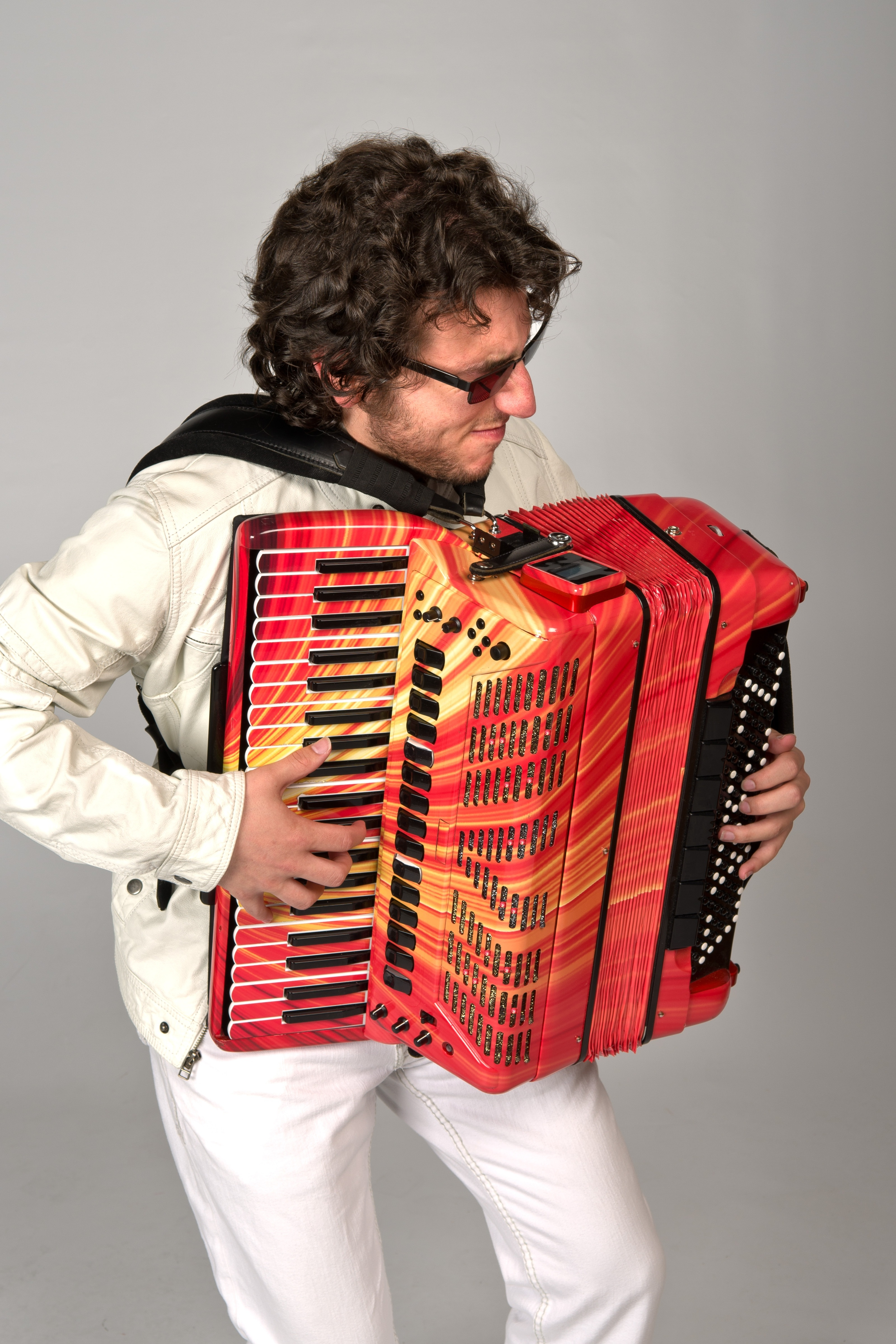
Cory Pesaturo and one of his modern electric accordions. This particular accordion has a full vinyl skin, and midi-sequenced LED's in the grill connected to the keys in a symmetric pattern.

== Life and career ==
Pesaturo got his start filling in for an ill Myron Floren at the former Warwick Music Theater in Rhode Island at age 11. Starting at the age of 12, he performed at the White House on four occasions, including at six other public and private functions for President Bill Clinton and Hillary Clinton. In June 1999, he performed at a State Dinner held for the President of Hungary, Árpád Göncz, becoming the youngest person to perform for a State Dinner.

He was accepted on the accordion at the New England Conservatory of Music in Boston, where he studied Contemporary Improvisation and a variety of music styles. Pesaturo became the second person to major in and graduate as an accordionist at the New England Conservatory. In 2008, Roland named Pesaturo as part of their team of four American accordionists to promote Roland's V-Accordion. Pesaturo performed for Roland at the NAMM Show in 2009 and was featured with Eddie Montiero in a concert for international press and NAMM dignitaries. He has also performed with different symphony orchestras around the country, including soloing for the Brockton Symphony Orchestra at 15.

Pesaturo performs in a wide range of musical styles. He plays Italian music festivals across the United States, mainstream music with DJ's, folk genres from French to Bulgarian and Jewish music, classical music performances with the Boston Symphony Orchestra, and jazz, which he is most known for.

His music has been played for various Formula 1 races on SPEED TV and now NBC Sports starting in 2007, on the Velocity program "Chasing Classic Cars", and also at various Concours around the United States such as the Pebble Beach Concours d'Elegance. Pesaturo has also combined his interest in statistics and sports with his collaborations on 98.5 The Sports Hub, and his appearance on the "100 Year Anniversary of Fenway Park" album in 2012, with current and past Boston Red Sox players, and journalists. Pesaturo's interest in weather prompted him to write the 2005 Atlantic Hurricane Season records list, later seasons of note, and other meteorological topics. Pesaturo was a featured contestant on CBS's Let's Make a Deal in 2021, performer on NBC's That's My Jam with Jimmy Fallon in 2022, and was chosen to be the featured accordionist on "Weird Al" Yankovic's biographical movie Weird: The Al Yankovic Story. Additionally, he has given four TEDx Talks, and a host of other talks at known conferences, including two Talks at Google.

== Discography ==
=== Albums ===
- Zulu Time (2011)
- Change in the Weather (2007)
- Crosswinds (2007)

=== Collaborative albums ===
- The Outrospectives LIVE! (2020)
- Unscripted with Mari Black (2020)
- The Outrospectives: Dancing Light (2019)
- 100 Year Anniversary of Fenway Park (2012)
- Tiny Orchestra (2008)
- A Pennywhistle Christmas (2004)

=== Soundtracks ===
- Weird: The Al Yankovic Story (2022)

== Conferences / Talks ==
=== TED Talks ===
- Revolutionizing the Accordion
- Winning Like the Red Sox
- World Collaboration Song for the COVID-19 Pandemic
- The Mind of a Musician

=== Talks at Google ===
- Accordion to Cory
