= Willie Ross (piper) =

Pipe Major Willie Ross MBE
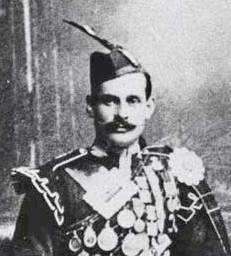
- Born: 14 June 1878; Ardchuilc, Glen Strathfarrar
- Died: 23 March 1966 (aged 87); Edinburgh
- Military career
- Allegiance: United Kingdom
- Branch: British Army
- Service years: 1896-1958
- Unit: Scots Guards
- Conflicts: Boer War; First World War; Western Front

Pipe Major William Collie Ross MBE (1878–1966) was a Scottish bagpipe player.

== Life ==
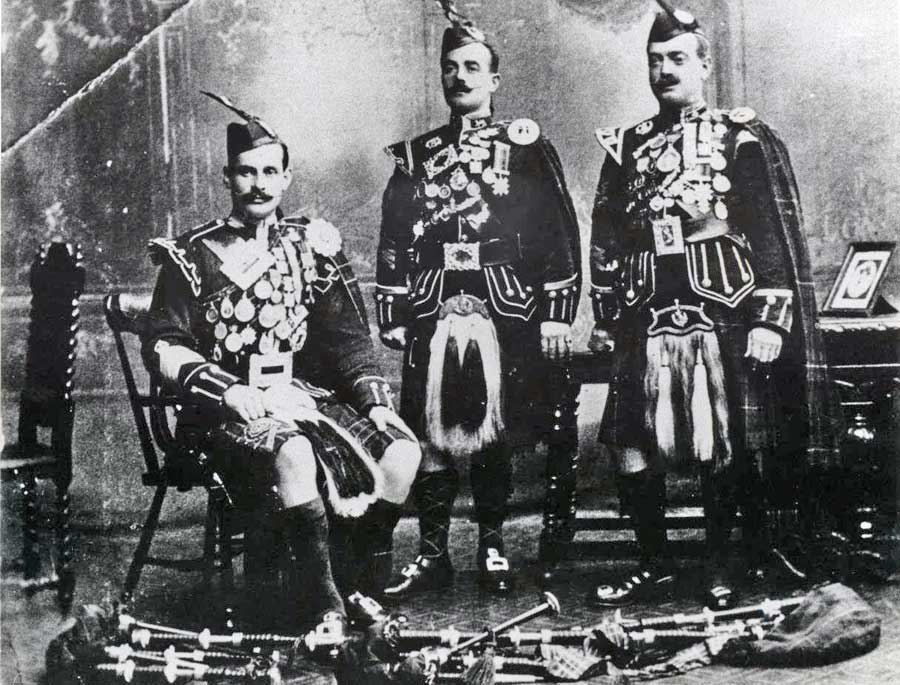
Willie Ross on the left, with G.S. McLennan in the middle and John Macdonald of Inverness on the right

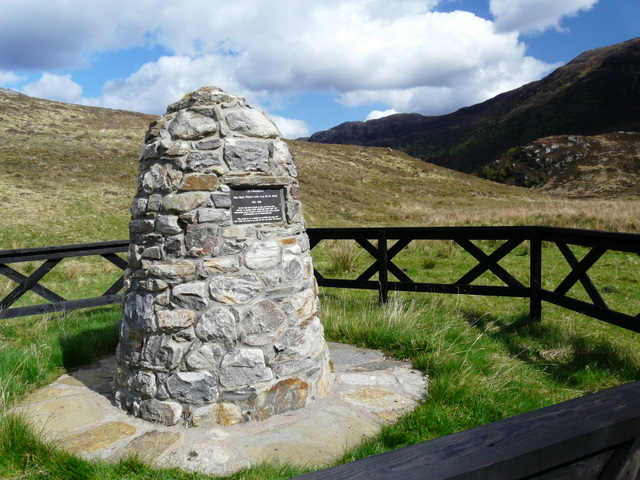
Memorial cairn at his birthplace

Ross was born on 14 June 1878 at Ardchuilc in Glen Strathfarrar, the second son of Alexander Ross and Mary Collie. He was taught by his maternal uncle Aeneas Rose, piper to the Duke of Atholl, but also received tuition from both his parents, in addition to taking lessons at Blair Castle during the school holidays.

At the age of 18 he joined the Scots Guards, and fought with the 1st Battalion in the Boer War from 1899 to 1902. In 1905 he became Pipe major of the 2nd Battalion, at the age of 24. His younger brother Alexander was also a piper, and became Pipe-Major of the 1st Battalion in 1911.

In 1919 Willie was made Instructor at the Army School of Bagpipe Music and Highland Drumming at Edinburgh Castle, where he taught hundreds of pupils, including almost all the top players produced by the army. Among his most famous students was John D. Burgess, who he taught as a private pupil from a young age. Burgess won both gold medals at the age of 16, and went on to become one of the most successful competitive pipers of the 20th century.

Ross was also Pipe-Major of the Lovat Scouts between 1921 and 1933.

He married Edith Mary McGregor in 1903, but she died suddenly in 1942. They had a son William who died aged about 7 (probably of cystic fibrosis) and a daughter Cecily who won Mòd Medals for her piano playing. Ross died in Edinburgh on 23 March 1966, aged 87. There is a memorial cairn near the house he was born in, which is now a ruin.

== Competition results ==
Ross won many of the top prizes of the day:

- Gold Medal at the Northern Meeting (1904)
- Gold Medal at the Argyllshire Gathering (1907 )
- Former Winners Clasp, Northern Meeting (1905, 1906, 1907, 1910, 1912, 1919, 1923, 1928)

== Compositions ==
Some of the tunes Willie Ross composed are:

- Loch Monar
- Leaving St Kilda
- Leaving Ardtornish
- Flight of the Eaglets
- Leaving Port Askaig
- Captain Norman Orr Ewing
- Brigadier Ronald Cheape of Tiroran
- Leaving Strathglass

He also collected and set 240 tunes into the 5 volumes of Pipe-Major W. Ross’s Collection of Highland Bagpipe Music.

The composition 'Corriechoillie's 43rd Welcome to the Northern Meeting' is often wrongly attributed to Willie Ross, but was in fact composed by an earlier William Ross (1823-1891) from the parish of Knockbain in Ross-shire, who was Pipe Major of 42nd Royal Highlanders (Black Watch), and became Piper to Queen Victoria on the 10th May 1854, a post which he continued to occupy up till the time of his death on 10 June 1891, at the age of 69.

The Corriechoillie in question is the notorious livestock drover and landowner John Cameron of Corriechoille, in Lochaber, who was given a special welcome on his 43rd attendance of the Northern Meeting.
