= Kapka Kassabova =

Bulgarian poet and writer

Kapka Kassabova FRSL
- Капка Касабова
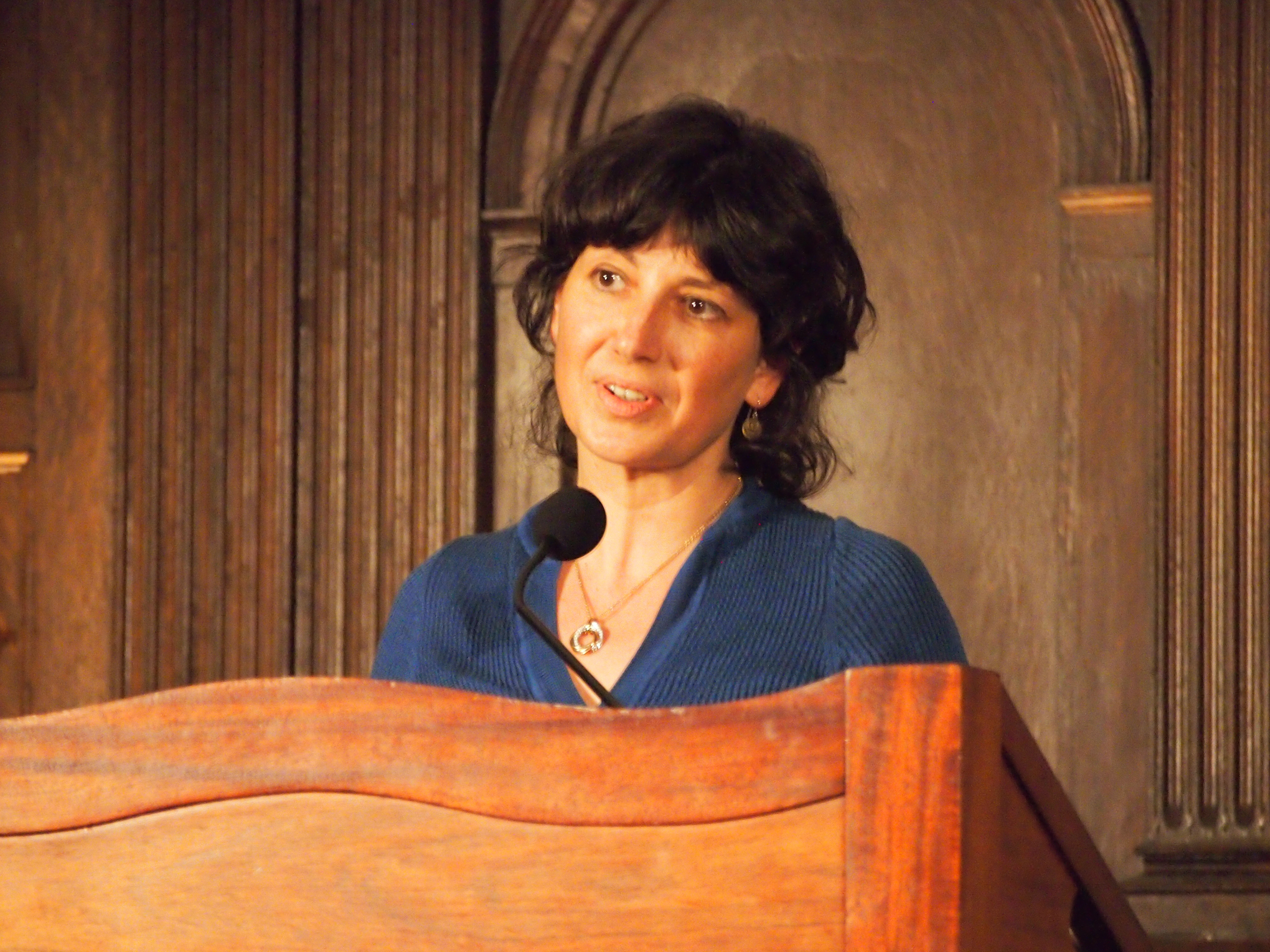
- Born: 1973 (age 52–53); Sofia, Bulgaria
- Occupations: Novelist, poet
- Writing career
- Language: English; Bulgarian
- Years active: 1997 – present
- Genre: Narrative non-fiction

Kapka Kassabova (Bulgarian: Капка Касабова; born in November 1973) is a poet and writer of fiction and narrative non-fiction. She is a bilingual writer in English, which is her main literary language, and in Bulgarian which is her mother tongue. Her books have been translated into at least twenty languages.

== Life ==
Kapka Kassabova was born and grew up in a family of scientists in Sofia, Bulgaria. She studied at the French College in Sofia. After leaving Bulgaria with her family in her late teens, she lived in New Zealand for twelve years where she studied French, Russian and English Literature and Creative Writing at the universities of University of Otago and Victoria, and published her first books of poetry and fiction. She moved to Scotland in 2005. After a number of years in Edinburgh, she settled in rural Inverness-shire.

== Career ==
Her debut poetry collection All Roads Lead to the Sea (1997) won an NZ Montana Book Award and her debut novel Reconnaissance won a Commonwealth Writers' Prize for Best First Book for Asia Pacific in 2000.

In 2008, Kassabova published the memoir Street Without a Name which was shortlisted for the Dolmann Club Travel Book Award and which Misha Glenny in The Guardian called a "profound meditation on the depth of change triggered by the events of 1989 throughout eastern Europe". Scotland on Sunday described it as "A memorable piece of acutely observed writing where events are relayed with a novelist's eye. With its sharply humorous details of close family life and the evocative and sometimes almost spiritual portrayal of an era lost and a country changed forever, this book recalls the writings of Isabel Allende".

Kassabova's tango biography Twelve Minutes of Love (2011), was hailed by The Independent as "an exquisitely crafted blend of travelogue, memoir, dance history, and some seriously good writing on the human condition." The Scotsman's reviewer wrote that "Kassabova is that rare thing, an author who excels in every genre". and the New Zealand Listener wrote that "Kassabova's poetry explores exile, disconnection and loss; her novels and travel writing are rich in insight, conjuring unsettling worlds. She brings these elements together in this exhilarating account of tango's addictive character. With a neat twist, she ultimately exposes its illusions, locating its place in a journey that is both personal and universal."

In 2017, she published Border: a journey to the edge of Europe. A "brave and moving study of the tragic borderland between Greece, Bulgaria and Turkey", it has been described in The Sunday Times as "an exceptional book about Bulgaria's dark, often magical borderlands...Smokily intense and quiveringly powerful." by Peter Pomerantsev as "a book about borders that makes the reader feel sumptuously free, an effect achieved by the way she moves between literary borders so gracefully: travelogue and existential drama; political history and poetry'. Mark Mazower described it in The Guardian as "a marvellous book about a magical part of the world", "mystery... is at the heart of the book; the mystery of marginal points and marginal people" The Economist described it as "witty, poignant, and erudite", "brings hidden history vividly to light". Caroline Moorhead in The New Statesman greeted it as "a timely, powerful story of immigration, friendship and travel", "an exceptional book, a tale of travelling and listening closely, and it brings something altogether new to the mounting literature on the story of modern migration". Professor Ash Amin of the British Academy in an award speech described Border as being "about the Eastern reaches of Europe, certainly, but also about the essence of place and the essence of human encounter." The Calvert Journal wrote that Border "reinvents writing about the Balkans."

Border won the 2018 British Academy Prize for Global Cultural Understanding, the 2018 Stanford Dolman Travel Book of the Year and the 2017 Saltire Society Scottish Book of the Year, and won the inaugural Highland Book Prize in 2018. It was shortlisted in the UK for the Baillie Gifford Prize, the Royal Society of Literature Ondaatje Prize, the Duff Cooper Prize, the Gordon Burn Prize, and the Bread and Roses Award; and in America for the National Book Critics Circle Awards. It also won the Jury Prize from the European Book Prize.

To the Lake came out in 2020 and together, the two books formed the beginning of what was to become a Balkan quartet. Each of the four books explores through a different angle the intimate relationship between people, place, and time and increasingly with each book - the question of where the human being belongs within the wider web of life. To the Lake was awarded France's Prix du meilleur livre etranger for non-fiction and was short-listed for the Highland Book Prize.

Her 2023 book Elixir is an exploration of ecological consciousness and plant-based traditions. The book is set in the Mesta River basin and its three mountains Rila, Pirin and the Rhodopes. Across several seasons, Kassabova learns about wild plants and experiences a symbiotic system where nature and culture have blended for thousands of years. She also learns of the devastating ecological and cultural disinheritance that the people of the valley have suffered. According to a review in The Economist the book is written "in subtle prose that mingles empathy with perspective".

Kassabova was elected a Fellow of the Royal Society of Literature (FRSL) in 2026.

== Books ==
=== Novels and Narrative Non-fiction ===
- —— (1999). Reconnaissance (paperback 1st ed.). Penguin NZ. ISBN 9780140283433.
- —— (2001). Love in the Land of Midas. London: Penguin. ISBN 9780141000121.
- —— (2008). Street Without a Name: Childhood and Other Misadventures in Bulgaria. Portobello. ISBN 9781846271236.
- —— (2011). Villa Pacifica. Penguin NZ/Alma Books. ISBN 9781846881862.
- —— (2011). Twelve Minutes of Love: A Tango Story. Portobello. ISBN 9781846272851.
- —— (2017). Border: A Journey to the Edge of Europe (paperback 1st ed.). Granta. ISBN 9781783782147.
- —— (2020). To the Lake: A Balkan Journey of War and Peace. Granta. ISBN 9781783783977.
- —— (2023). Elixir: In the Valley at the End of Time. Jonathan Cape/Graywolf. ISBN 9781787333260.
- —— (2024). Anima: A Wild Pastoral. Jonathan Cape. ISBN 9781787333277.
- —— (2026). Borrowed Land: A Highland Story. Penguin. ISBN 9781787335349.

=== Contributions ===
- Bell, Leonard (2009). "Introduction by Kapka Kassabova". Marti Friedlander: Photographs (hardcover 1st ed.). Auckland University Press. ISBN 9781869404444.

=== Poetry ===
- —— (1997). All Roads Lead to the Sea. Auckland University Press. ISBN 9781869405281.
- —— (1999). Dismemberment. Auckland University Press. ISBN 9781869402075.
- —— (2003). Someone Else's Life. Bloodaxe.
- —— (2007). Geography for the Lost. Bloodaxe.
