= Mari Black =

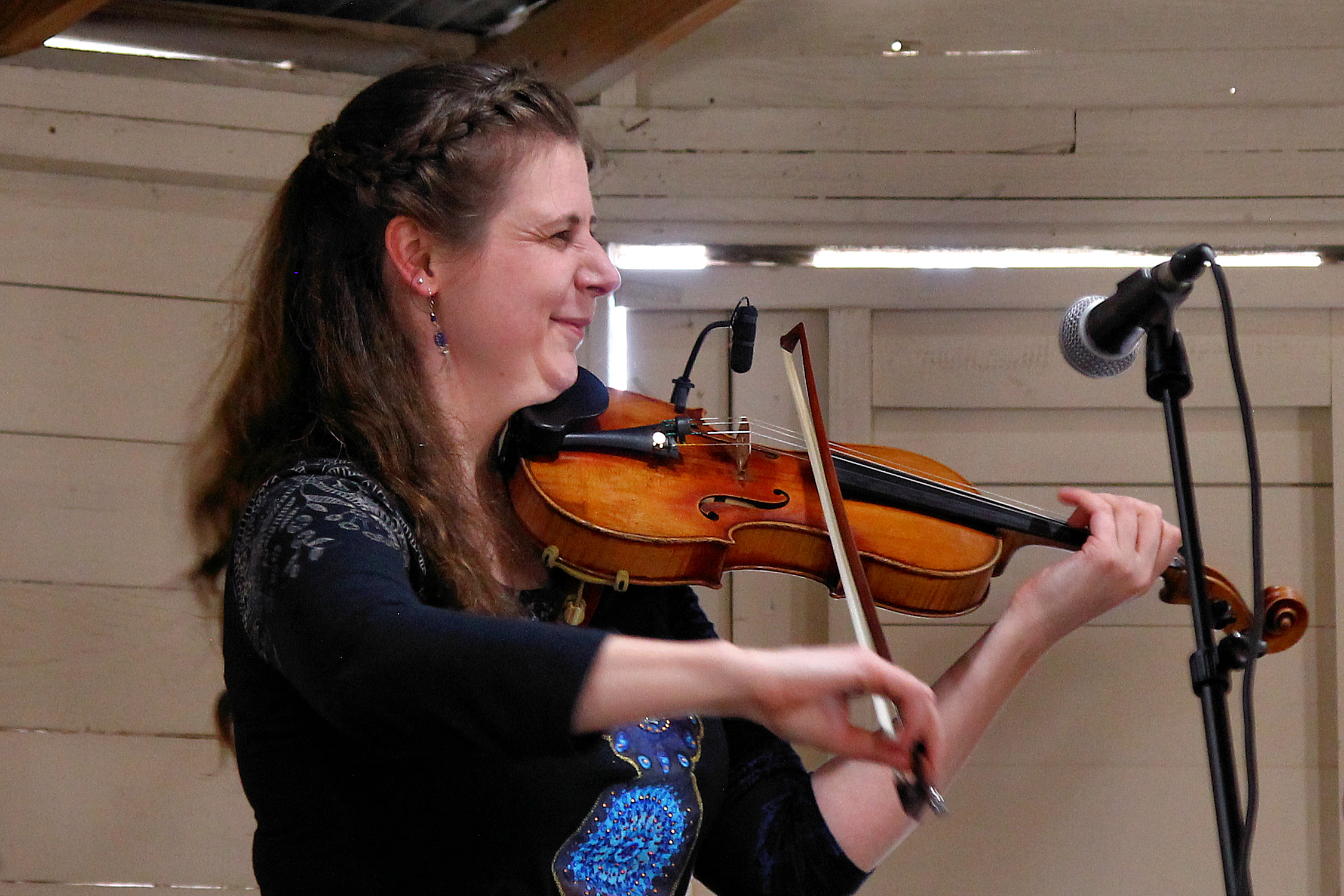
- Black at the Austin Celtic Festival 2023

Background information
- Origin: Boston, MA, USA
- Genres: Scottish fiddling, Irish fiddling, Canadian fiddling, jazz, oldtime, Appalachian, tango, Classical, klezmer, folk
- Occupations: Violinist, Fiddler, Composer, Educator
- Instruments: Violin, Fiddle
- Website: http://www.MariBlack.com

Mari Black is an American multistyle violinist, fiddler, and composer from Boston, Massachusetts. She has won national and international accolades in many styles of music, including being named the 2014 Glenfiddich Fiddle Champion of Scotland, 2013 and 2015 U.S. National Scottish Fiddle Champion, 2012 and 2014 Maritime Fiddle Festival Champion, 2011 Canadian Open Novelty Fiddle Champion, 2011 1st Prize Winner of the American Protege International Piano and Strings Competition, and more. Mari has performed and taught around the United States, Scotland, Brazil, Canada, China, Korea, Zimbabwe, Hungary, Poland, the Czech Republic, Italy, and France. She plays many different styles of music including Irish, Scottish, Canadian, and American fiddling, Argentine Tango, jazz, klezmer, Western Classical music, and folk.

Black received a Master of Music degree and Artist Diploma in Violin Performance from the Yale School of Music, and a Doctorate degree in Education from Columbia University’s Teachers College, where she was the Geffen Fellow in Interdisciplinary Arts and Creativity.

== Notable awards ==
- 2022 - Dan R. MacDonald Fiddle Prize, Scottish Performing Arts Classic
- 2021 - Freshgrass Fiddle Awards, finalist
- 2019 and 2021 - U.S. Grand Master Fiddle Championships, top 10
- 2017 - MASC International Songwriting Competition, Gold Medal, Instrumental category
- 2015 and 2013 - U.S. National Scottish Fiddle Champion
- 2014 and 2012 - Maritime Fiddle Champion
- 2014 - Glenfiddich Fiddle Champion of Scotland
- 2011 - Canadian Open Novelty Fiddle Champion
- 2011 - American Protege International Strings and Piano Competition, 1st prize
- 2008 - Columbia University Teachers College, Geffen Fellowship in Interdisciplinary Arts and Creativity
- 2007 and 2005 - American String Teachers' Association Alternative Styles Award winner

== Discography ==
- Unscripted (2020, with Cory Pesaturo)
- Flight (2014)
