= Night Train to Odesa =

2024 book by Jen Stout

Night Train to Odesa: Covering the Human Cost of Russia’s War
- Author: Jen Stout
- Publisher: Polygon Books
- Publication date: 2 May 2024
- Media type: Print (hardcover)
- Pages: 288
- ISBN: 978-1-84697-647-6

Night Train to Odesa: Covering the Human Cost of Russia’s War is a 2024 book by Scottish freelance journalist Jen Stout, documenting her experiences reporting from the War in Ukraine.

In 2024, Night Train to Odesa won the First Book of the Year at Scotland’s National Book Awards and the Highland Book Prize.
