= Oban High School =

- Àrd-sgoil an Òbain
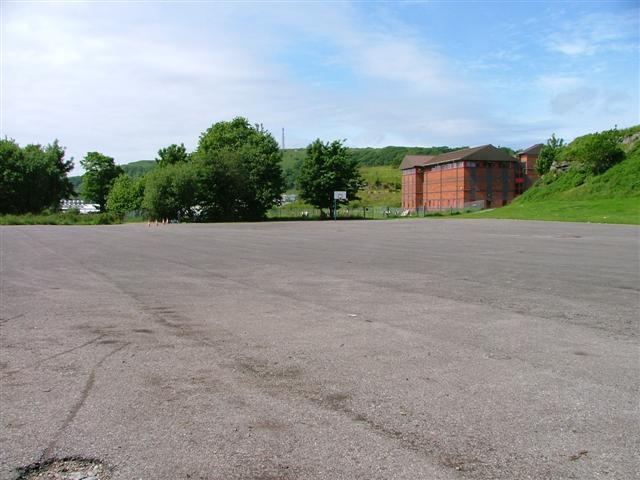
- The old Oban High School was replaced by a new building in 2018

Location
- Soroba Road, Oban, Argyll and Bute, PA34 4JB; Scotland; 56.406°N 5.467°W

Information
- Type: Comprehensive secondary school
- Motto: Dia ar n-Iùl
- Established: 1890
- Local authority: Argyll and Bute Council
- Head teacher: Peter Bain
- Gender: Boys and girls
- Age: 11 to 18
- Enrolment: 924 as of August 2022
- Houses: Diarmid; Fingal; Ossian; Somerled
- Colour
- Website: www.obanhigh.argyll-bute.sch.uk

Oban High School (Scottish Gaelic: Àrd-sgoil an Òbain) is a secondary school in Oban, Argyll, Scotland.

As well as serving Oban, Oban High School also serves some of Scotland's island communities such as Isle of Mull, Tiree and Iona.

== History ==
Oban High School opened in 1890 as Oban Higher Grade School. The building was designed by Alexander Shairp. Former teachers at the school have included Iain Crichton Smith and John MacKay, Baron MacKay of Ardbrecknish.

Oban High School has 19 associated primary schools, making it one of the largest geographical catchment areas in Scotland. The school provides secondary education for pupils from remote, rural and island areas, as well as a large number of pupils from larger urban areas. Pupils who attended Oban High School from nine island communities stay in the school hostel throughout the school term.

During the 2010 pipe band season, the school's pipe band, led by Angus MacColl, was successful in winning the World Pipe Band Championships in Glasgow, the Cowal Games competition, and the Champion of Champions for the year in the novice-juvenile grade.

== Guidance structure ==
Oban High School currently has four guidance houses known as "clans":

- Diarmid
- Fingal
- Ossian
- Somerled

Each of the four clans have two classes from each year group, S1–S6, with pupils in S6 encouraged to take on leadership roles within their respective clans. Pupils in S6 can apply to become Clan Leaders at the start of each academic year. Each clan is headed by a Principal Teacher of Guidance, as well as a Clan Chief who is elected to the position directly by the pupils.

== Hostel ==
Pupils from island communities who fall within the catchment area of Oban High School often require to live in hostel accommodation Monday–Friday as travel back to the island communities can be too long a journey for pupils to undertake each day. Glencruitten Hostel provides support and accommodation to pupils from Oban High School from island communities such as Colonsay, Coll, Isle of Mull, Lismore, Iona, Kerrera, Gometra, Tiree, Shuna, Easdale and Bridge of Orchy. The hostel closes during school holidays with all pupils returning to their families on the islands.

== Notable people ==
- Magnus Bradbury – rugby union player
- Angus Peter Campbell – born 1952, poet, novelist, journalist, broadcaster and actor
- Abi Evans – rugby union player
- Anne Lorne Gillies – singer, writer and Gaelic activist
- Dr Anna Keay – architectural historian, author and broadcaster
- Magnus MacFarlane-Barrow – humanitarian, founder and CEO of Mary's Meals and former Scotland Shinty internationalist
- Robert MacIntyre – professional golfer, PGA Tour and Ryder Cup winner
- Angus MacColl – professional piper, musician and major of the Oban High School Pipe Band
- David Dougal Williams – artist and Principal Art Teacher at Oban High School from 1919 to 1922
- Susie Wolff – racing driver, Formula 1 TV pundit, Formula E team principal

== Pupil leadership ==
Oban High School has a clan system pupil leadership programme. The school has four clans and each clan has two clan leaders selected from S6. In addition Oban High School also has school captains; this has traditionally been a 'head boy' and 'head girl'.
