= Roseanne Watt =

Scottish poet, filmmaker, and musician

- Born: 1991 (age 34–35); Shetland, Scotland
- Education: University of Stirling
- Occupations: Poet, filmmaker, musician
- Writing career
- Notable work: Moder Dy
- Notable awards: The Edwin Morgan Poetry Prize (2018); The Somerset Maugham Award (2020)

Roseanne Watt (born 1991) is a Scottish poet, filmmaker, and musician. She writes in both English and Shetland dialect. Her first poetry collection Moder Dy won multiple awards, including the Edwin Morgan Poetry Award in 2018 and the Somerset Maugham Award in 2020.

== Biography ==
Roseanne Watt was born and raised in the Shetland Isles in Scotland. She attended the University of Stirling, where she earned a master's degree in English and film studies and later a PhD in creative writing and film. During her PhD studies, she was supervised by poet Kathleen Jamie. Watt's first poetry collection, Moder Dy was published by Polygon Books in 2019. The book is written in a mix of English and Shetland dialect. "Moder Dy ('Mother Wave') refers to an undercurrent believed to run east from Foula, taking Shetland fishermen back home". Home is an important theme in the poetry collection.

As a filmmaker, Watt creates film poems which explore the language, literary traditions and landscape of Shetland. She is currently the poetry editor for the online literary journal The Island Review. She also performs in the bands Lukkie Minnine and Wulver, where she plays fiddle, vocals and guitar. She currently lives and works in Shetland.

== Awards and recognition ==
- The Edwin Morgan Poetry Prize 2018, Moder Dy
- Saltire Literary Award, Poetry Book of the Year 2019, Moder Dy, shortlist
- The Highland Book Prize 2019 Moder Dy, co-winner
- The Society of Authors Eric Gregory Award 2020, Moder Dy
- The Somerset Maugham Award 2020, Moder Dy
