= 78th Highlanders (Halifax Citadel) Pipe Band =

Canadian pipe band

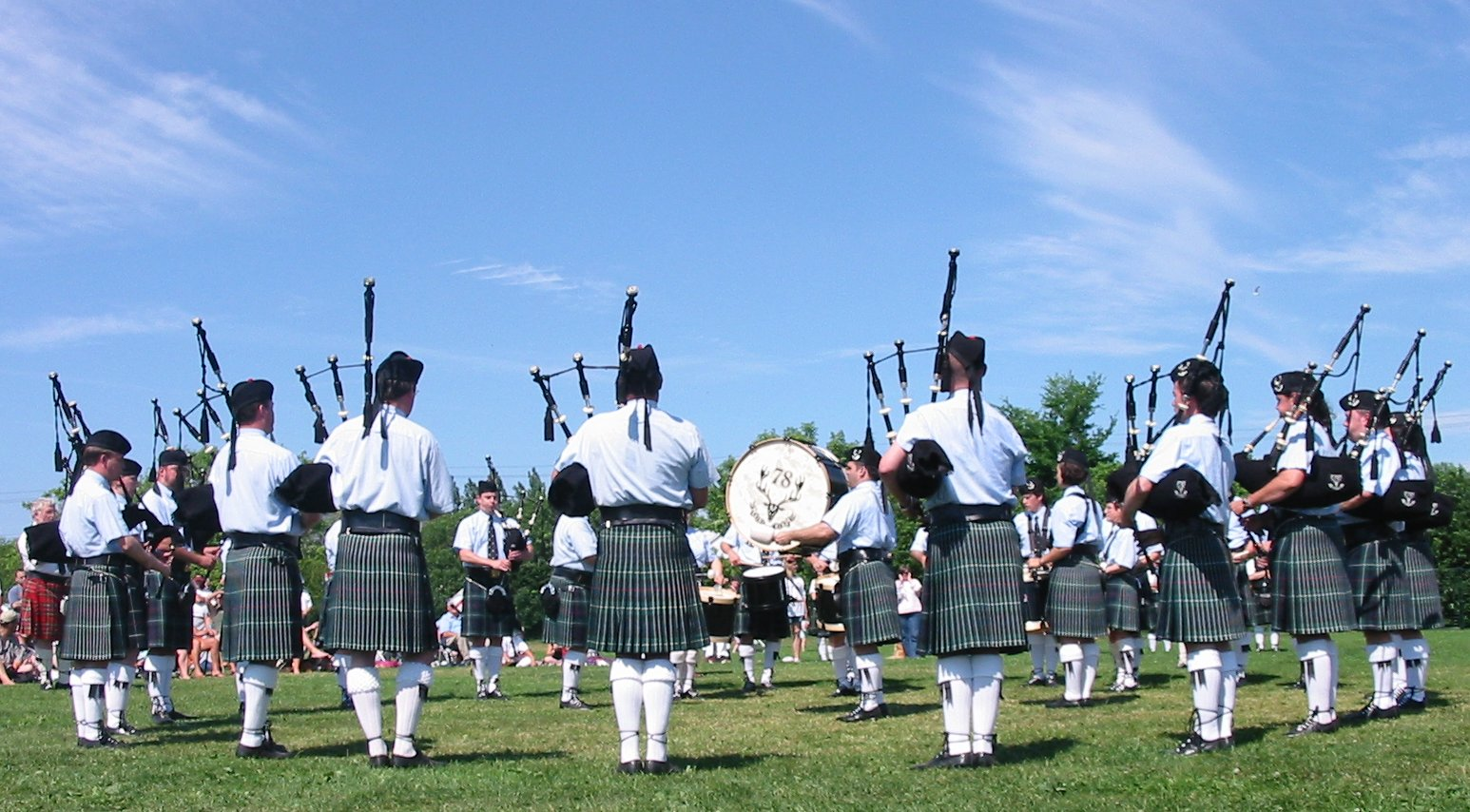
- Established: 1983
- Location: Halifax, Nova Scotia, Canada
- Grade: 1
- Pipe major: Alex Gandy
- Drum sergeant: Tom Cuming
- Tartan: Mackenzie
- Notable honours: 1st place, North American Pipe Band Championships: 2003 & 2014 13th place, World Pipe Band Championships: 2005 12th place, World Pipe Band Championships: 2015
- Website: 78thhalifaxpipeband.org

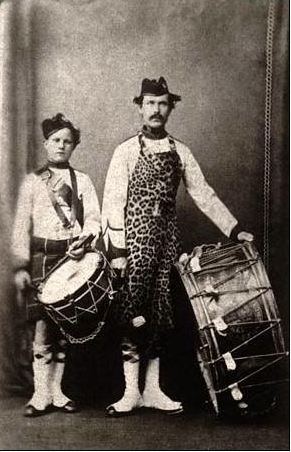
Drummers of the 78th (Highlanders) Regiment of Foot, 1860

The 78th Highlanders (Halifax Citadel) Pipe Band is a grade one pipe band formed in 1983 in Halifax, Nova Scotia, Canada. They work in conjunction with a re-enactor troop for the 78th (Highlanders) Regiment of Foot, the regiment that spent almost three years stationed at Citadel Hill (Fort George) (1869-1871).

When the 78th Highlanders were in Halifax they had 21 drummers and 6 pipers. Today there are approximately 60 pipers and drummers. The band's Pipe Major is Alex Gandy and the lead drummer is Tom Cuming.

== History ==
In the 1930s, the Halifax Police Department sponsored a fife and drum band, which was dissolved in 1939. After the war, some of its members joined, as teachers, the Queen Elizabeth High School Army Cadet Corps Pipe Band. That was dissolved in the mid-60s and its members formed the civilian pipe band The Lovett Scots, which soon became the Wylde Thyme Pipe Band. In 1983, that band aligned itself with the Halifax Police Department, under the sponsorship of the Halifax Police Association.

Under Pipe Major Wayne Moug, the 78th started competing at the grade three level and has since consistently maintained the title of Champion Supreme in Atlantic Canada, in competition through the Atlantic Canada Pipe Band Association. In 1991, the band was promoted to Grade 1.

In June 2001, due to budget issues, the band was released by the Halifax Police Department. The band immediately aligned itself with the re-enactor troop for the 78th (Highlanders) Regiment of Foot and became the 78th Highlanders (Halifax Citadel) Pipes and Drums. It continued to climb in the international Grade 1 rankings, representing Halifax at competitions in Canada, the United States and Scotland. It regularly competes at the World Pipe Band Championships, ranking 8th in 2004, 13th in 2005 and 12th in 2015. In 2003 and 2014, the band won the North American Pipe Band Championships.

At the last North American Pipe Band Championships, in 2019, the band placed third.

The regiment's original pipe major, Alexander McKellar (1824-1895), wrote many compositions named after numerous battles of the 78th Regiment. Some of these including "The 78th's Farewell to Belgaum", "Burning of the Piper's Hut", "Highland Brigade's March to Lucknow" and "The Barren Rocks of Aden". There was some dispute about the authorship of The Barren Rocks of Aden, to which McKellar responded, "The air is mine. The name is mine. Who has a better right to give a name to a child but the father."

The band played the "Mull of Kintyre" live with Sir Paul McCartney on July 11, 2009 in Halifax.

== Pipe Majors ==
- Robert Smith (1983)
- Wayne Moug (1983–1988)
- Doug Boyd (1988–1994)
- John Walsh (1994–1998)
- Roderick MacLean (2001–2011)
- Alex Gandy (2011–Present)

== Discography ==
- The Pipes and Drums Of The 78th Highlanders (1997), Independent
- The World Pipe Band Championships 2004 (2004), Monarch Recordings

== See also ==
- Canadian military bands
- Canadian music
