= Angus MacDonald (piper) =

- Born: 20 October 1938; Glasgow, Scotland
- Died: 25 June 1999 (aged 60); Edinburgh, Scotland
- Occupation: Bagpiper
- Known for: Pipe Major of the Scots Guards, personal piper to Elizabeth II
- Awards: Member of the Order of the British Empire (MBE)

Angus MacDonald (20 October 1938 – 25 June 1999) was a Scottish bagpiper and composer who achieved international recognition as one of the best Highland pipers in the 20th century.

== Early life ==
MacDonald was born in Cardonald, Glasgow, the son of Alexander ("Alick") MacDonald, a former Cameron Highlanders soldier and police band piper. He began playing the bagpipes under his father's instruction and later attended the Queen Victoria School in Dunblane, where MacDonald became boy pipe major. At the age of fifteen, he enlisted in the Scots Guards in 1953, beginning a military career that would span three decades.

== Military and musical career ==
During his service, MacDonald rose through the ranks to become Pipe Major and, in 1965, Household Piper to Elizabeth II. He performed around the world, taught at the Guards Depot piping school at Pirbright, and later became senior instructor at the Army School of Bagpipe Music and Highland Drumming and piper to the governor of Edinburgh Castle. In recognition of his contributions, he was appointed a Member of the Order of the British Empire in 1983, the year of his retirement.

MacDonald won many major piping awards, including the Clasp and Gold Medal of the Highland Society of London, and the Grant’s Scotch Whisky Championship at Blair Castle. His compositions and recordings, including the first album in Lismor Records’ World’s Greatest Pipers series, influenced both traditional and contemporary piping.

== Later life and death ==
Following his retirement from the army, MacDonald taught and performed internationally, including in Oman, Malaysia, and the United States, and served as senior instructor at the National Piping Centre in Glasgow. He also edited and published several collections of pipe music and contributed to the Scots Guards tune books.

MacDonald died of pancreatic cancer in Edinburgh on 25 June 1999, aged 60. He was survived by his daughter and other family members.
