= Callum Beaumont =

Scottish bagpipe player

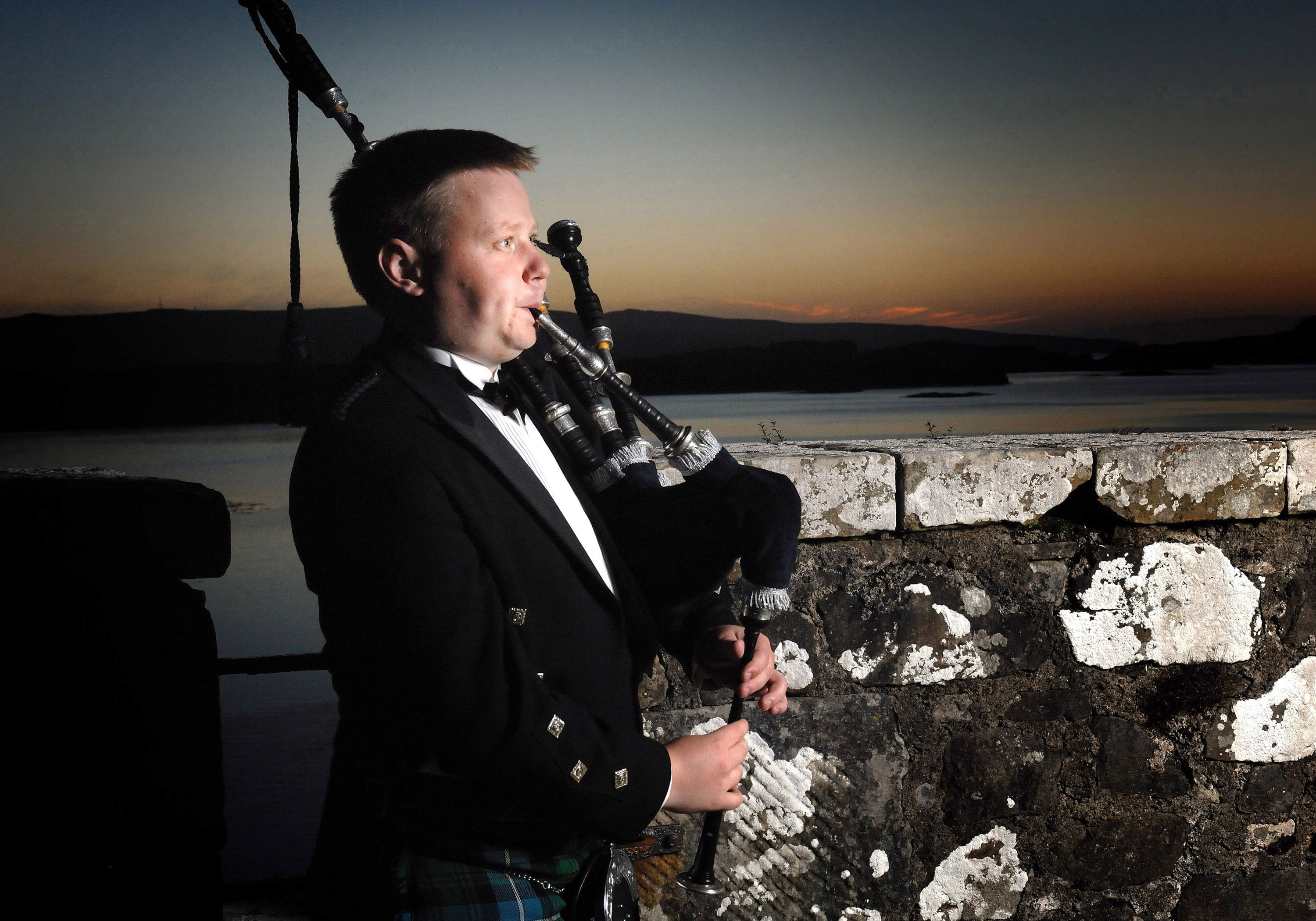

Background information
- Born: 17 December 1988 (age 37)
- Instrument: Bagpipes
- Website: callumbeaumont.com

Callum Beaumont (born 1988) is Scottish bagpipe player.

== Life ==
He was born in Bo'ness in central Scotland, and started playing the practice chanter at the age of seven.

== Career ==
At the age of 12 he joined the now defunct Lothian & Borders Police Pipe Band, and then played with Shotts & Dykehead, Simon Fraser University, Inveraray & District and ScottishPower. He won the World Pipe Band Championships twice with Simon Fraser University, once with Shotts & Dykehead and once with Inveraray and District.

He teaches at Dollar Academy, which has a successful youth pipe band. Whilst leading the Novice A pipe band, they have won 2 Grand Slam Titles.

As a solo piper he has won most of the top prizes in piping. Prizes include;

Solo Piping Achievements
| Competition | Prize | Years won |
|---|---|---|
| Glenfiddich Piping Championships | Overall Champion | 2023, 2024 |
| | MSR | 2018, 2024 |
| | Piobaireachd | 2022, 2023 |
| Northern Meetings, Inverness | The Clasp | 2012, 2015, 2018, 2019, 2023, 2026 |
| | Former Winners MSR, Silver Star | 2023, 2025 |
| | Highland Society of London Gold Medal | 2013 |
| | 'A' Grade MSR | 2018 |
| | Overall Winner | 2023, 2026 |
| Argyllshire Gathering, Oban | Highland Society of London Gold Medal | 2011 |
| | Silver Medal | 2006 |
| | MacGregor Memorial | 2003 |
| | Open Jigs | 2011 |
| | 'A' Grade Strathspey and Reel | 2023 |
| | 'A' March | 2024 |
| The Scottish Piping Society of London, London Competition | Overall Winner | 2014, 2016, 2018, 2019, 2021, 2026 |
| | Am Bratach Gorm | 2016, 2019, 2026 |
| | William Gillies Cup | 2018, 2019 |
| | Former Winners MSR | 2014, 2015, 2018, 2019, 2021, 2022, 2026 |
| | J.B Robertson March | 2018, 2019, 2021 |
| Donald MacLeod Memorial, Stornoway | Overall Winner | 2013, 2023 |
| | Piobaireachd | 2013, 2019, 2023 |
| | MSR | 2023 |
| Dunvegan, Skye | Overall Winner | 2014, 2022 |
| | Silver Chanter | 2013 |
| | Dunvegan Medal | 2014 |
| | Clasp to the Dunvegan Medal | 2014, 2022 |
| Springbank Invitational, Campbeltown | Overall Winner | 2018,2024 |
| | Piobaireachd | 2024 |
| | Hornpipe and Jig | 2013, 2015 |
| | 6/8 March | 2016 |
| Piping Live! | Alasdair Gillies Memorial Recital Challenge | 2019, 2020, 2021,2026 |
| The Metro Cup, USA | Overall Winner | 2014, 2016, 2017, 2018, 2019 |
| | Piobaireachd | 2016, 2017 |
| | Medley | 2014, 2017, 2019 |
| The Masters, National Piping Centre | Overall | 2021, 2022 |
| | Piobaireachd | 2013, 2021, 2022 |
| Captain John A. MacLellan MBE Memorial | | |
| | Piobaireachd | 2025 |
| | Overall | 2024, 2025 |
| The Sun Belt Invitational, Florida | Overall | 2022,2024 |
| | Piobaireachd | 2022,2024 |
| | Medley | 2023 |
| Uist and Barra | Overall Winner | 2016, 2017 |
| | Piobaireachd | 2016, 2017,2024 |
| Donald MacDonald Quaich, Skye | Winner | 2017, 2021 |
| Braemar Highland Gathering | Overall Winner | 2014 |
| | Gold Medal | 2014 |
