= Moniack Mhor =

Creative writing centre in Scotland

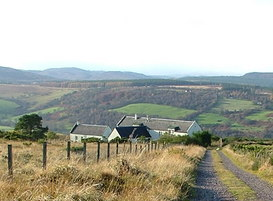
- The building in November 2006
- Founders: Kit and Sophia Fraser
- Established: 1993
- Head: Rachel Humphries
- Address: Teavarran, Kiltarlity, Beauly, Scotland IV4 7HT
- Location: Kiltarlity, Beauly, Inverness-shire, Scotland
- Coordinates: 57.4072575°N 4.4521987°W
- Website: www.moniackmhor.org.uk

Moniack Mhor is a creative writing centre in Scotland. Based in the Scottish Highlands, Moniack Mhor is fourteen miles from Inverness. The centre is a registered charity and is supported by Creative Scotland.

== History ==
The centre has given residential courses since its inception. These are usually up to a week long and the tutors are usually high-profile writers and other visiting guest speakers. The students range from established to teenaged writers. Courses include fiction, non-fiction, poetry, playwriting, travel writing and song writing courses given by names such as Morag Joss, William McIlvanney, Carol Ann Duffy, Andrew O'Hagan, Alasdair Gray, Findlay Napier and Bella Hardy. The centre also runs an outreach programme around creative writing for young people in the Highlands and provides bursaries for people struggling to manage the costs of the courses.

From its foundation the centre had been set up as one of the centres for the writers’ charity Arvon. In 1999 the centre was temporarily closed but took off again. In 2015 the centre became an independent organisation assisted by funding from Creative Scotland .

== Prizes ==
Places on courses at the retreat have been awarded as prizes for Scottish book awards, such as the Caledonia Novel Award and the Scottish Book Trust's Next Chapter Award.

There are a number of fellowships available through the centre. These include:

- The Jessie Kesson Fellowship
- Emerging Writer Award
- Writing for Children Bursary
- Travel Writing Bursary
- Katharine Stewart Bursary

In 2017 the centre founded the Highland Book Prize with the cooperation of The Highland Society of London and Ullapool Book Festival.
