= Gordon Walker (piper) =

- Born: 13 December 1967 (age 58); Ayrshire, Scotland
- Instrument: Bagpipes

Gordon Walker (born 13 December 1967) is a Scottish bagpiper.

== Early life ==
Gordon Walker was born in Ayrshire on 13 December 1967. He first began piping lessons when he was four and a half years old and has said "I could play a scale before I knew the alphabet." His uncles Jim and Bert were pipers in the Scots Guards and this became his ambition. Subsequently, he was introduced to a family friend, Pipe Major David Kay from Cumnock who was his first tutor, he subsequently received Piobaireachd tuition from Iain Clowe of Dumfries.

== Army career ==
He enlisted as a junior soldier in The Royal Highland Fusiliers and was sent for training to Bridge of Don on the completion of two years junior training he joined the battalion in West Berlin. He undertook the Pipe Majors course at the Army School of Bagpiping and Highland Drumming which was held at Edinburgh Castle, he passed with Distinguished honours.

He saw active service in the Gulf War in 1991 and tours of duty in Bosnia in 1995 and Northern Ireland in 1996. Later in his army career he had Piobaireachd tuition from the late Captain Andrew Pitkeathly, former personal piper to Queen Elizabeth II and Director of Army Bagpipe Music at the Army School of Bagpipe Music and Highland Drumming.

== Child abuse conviction ==
In August 2019, Walker was found guilty of a catalogue of abuse against six pupils at the private school where he was the teacher of piping. Although he did not receive a prison sentence he was placed under supervision by social workers for three years. He had to carry out 300 hours’ unpaid work and was banned from contacting or being with children under the age of 17. He was also placed on the Sex Offenders Register for three years. He still continues to do piping jobs for a certain piping company based in glasgow.

== Awards ==
- Oban Silver Medal, 1987
- Oban Gold Medal, 1993
- Inverness Gold Medal, 1994
- Open Piobaireachd at Oban in 1995 and 2007.
- Former Winners March, Strathspey and Reel at Oban in 1994, 1995, 1996, 2003, 2004 and 2005,
- Former Winners March, Strathspey and Reel at Inverness in 1990, 1993, 2000, 2001.
- Silver Chanter. Dunvegan, Skye in 2004
- Glenfiddich Piping Championship in 2007.

== Compositions ==
Walker has composed a number of tunes, including The Fiddler's Rally.

== Discography ==
- Piping Centre: 3rd Recital Series, Vol. II (2001)
- The Lady and the Piper (2003)
- Pipers of Distinction/Walker (2007)
- World's Greatest Pipers, Vol. 13 (2007)
