= Highland Society of London =

Charity in England and Wales

The Highland Society of London is a charity registered in England and Wales, with "the view of establishing and supporting schools in the Highlands and in the Northern parts of Great Britain, for relieving distressed Highlanders at a distance from their native homes, for preserving the antiquities and rescuing from oblivion the valuable remains of Celtic literature, and for promoting the improvement and general welfare of the Northern parts of Great Britain".

== History ==
Highland Society of London Act 1816
- Act of Parliament
- Parliament of the United Kingdom
- Long title: An Act for the Incorporation of The Highland Society of London; for the better Management of the Funds of the Society; and for rendering its Exertions more extensive and beneficial to the Public.
- Citation: 56 Geo. 3. c. xx

Dates
- Royal assent: 21 May 1816

Text of statute as originally enacted

Highland Society of London Act 1831
- Act of Parliament
- Parliament of the United Kingdom
- Long title: An Act for repealing, altering, enlarging, and amending certain Provisions of an Act passed in the Fifty-sixth Year of the Reign of His late Majesty King George the Third, intituled "An Act for the Incorporation of the Highland Society of London, for the better Management of the Funds of the Society, and for rendering its Exertions more extensive and beneficial to the Public."
- Citation: 1 & 2 Will. 4. c. xlvii

Dates
- Royal assent: 23 August 1831

Text of statute as originally enacted

The society was founded in 1778 by Highland gentlemen resident in London and was incorporated by an act of Parliament, the Highland Society of London Act 1816 (56 Geo. 3. c. xx) on 21 May 1816.

Within a year of its foundation, its members had come to include a number of notable Scots:

- Lord Macleod
- Sir Harry Monro
- Hon Archibald Fraser of Lovat
- Archibald Macdonald
- Hon. General Fraser (President)
- Lord Adam Gordon
- The Earl of Eglinton
- John Macpherson
- The Duke of Gordon
- The Duke of Atholl
- John Campbell of Calder
- The Earl of Seaforth
- Lord Frederick Campbell
- The Earl of Caithness
- Major-General Munro
- William Wemyss

The Presidents over the first 25 years of the Society's existence were:

- 1778 Simon Fraser of Lovat
- 1779 Archibald Montgomerie, 11th Earl of Eglinton
- 1780 James Graham, 3rd Duke of Montrose
- 1781 Alexander Gordon, 4th Duke of Gordon
- 1782 Lord Adam Gordon
- 1783 John Murray, 4th Duke of Atholl
- 1784 Lord Adam Gordon
- 1785 John Murray, 4th Earl of Dunmore
- 1786 John Campbell, 1st Marquess of Breadalbane
- 1787 Douglas Hamilton, 8th Duke of Hamilton
- 1788 Francis Mackenzie, 1st Baron Seaforth
- 1789 Francis Stuart, 9th Earl of Moray
- 1790 James Duff, 2nd Earl Fife
- 1791 Alexander Macdonald, 1st Baron Macdonald
- 1792 George Campbell, 6th Duke of Argyll
- 1793 George Gordon, 5th Duke of Gordon
- 1794 Robert Hay-Drummond, 10th Earl of Kinnoull
- 1795 John Murray, 4th Duke of Atholl
- 1796 Sir John Sinclair, 1st Baronet
- 1797 George Gordon, 9th Marquess of Huntly
- 1798 Eric Mackay, 7th Lord Reay
- 1799 Henry Dundas, 1st Viscount Melville
- 1800 Hector Munro, 8th laird of Novar
- 1801 James Forbes, 17th Lord Forbes
- 1802 Alexander Macdonald, 2nd Baron Macdonald
- 1803 George Gordon, 5th Duke of Gordon
- 1804 Alexander Hamilton, 10th Duke of Hamilton
- 1805 Archibald Hamilton, 9th Duke of Hamilton
- 1806 Prince Augustus Frederick, Duke of Sussex
- 1807 Prince Augustus Frederick, Duke of Sussex
- 1808 Prince Augustus Frederick, Duke of Sussex
- 1809 George Gordon, 5th Duke of Gordon
- 1810 George Gordon, 5th Duke of Gordon
- 1811 George Gordon, 5th Duke of Gordon
- 1812 George Gordon, 5th Duke of Gordon
- 1813 Prince Augustus Frederick, Duke of Sussex

== Activities ==
In 1782, the Society was instrumental in securing the repeal of the Dress Act 1746, the statutory proscription of Highland Dress, introduced after the Jacobite rising of 1745. It has a well known and definitive collection of clan tartans established in the early 19th century. In its early days it was active in the investigations into the authenticity of the poems supposedly by Ossian, which it had also helped to publish.

The Society supports and awards annual prizes for piping, including gold medals at the Northern Meeting and Argyllshire Gathering. Its early records are deposited in the National Library of Scotland.

== Highland Book Prize ==
In 2017, the Society established the Highland Book Prize in collaboration with Moniack Mhor. Open to fiction, non-fiction and poetry, the prize "celebrates the finest published work that recognises the rich talent, landscape, and cultural diversity of the Scottish Highlands".

In 2020, during the COVID-19 pandemic, the 2019 prize was jointly awarded to all four shortlisted authors "equally as a collective, as a celebration of life, literature and community".

Year	Work	Author	Result	Ref(s)
2024	Night Train to Odesa	Jen Stout	Winner	
2024	Birds Humans Machines Dolphins	Genevieve Carver	Shortlist	
2024	Gliff	Ali Smith	Shortlist	
2024	Women of the Hebrides / Ban-eileanaich Innse Gall	Joni Buchanan	Shortlist	
2023	Sea Bean	Sally Huband	Winner	
2023	Columba's Bones	David Greig	Shortlist	
2023	Elixir: In the Valley at the End of Time	Kapka Kassabova	Shortlist	
2023	Nothing Left to Fear from Hell	Alan Warner	Shortlist	
2023	Wild Air: In Search of Birdsong	James Macdonald Lockhart	Shortlist	
2022	Crann-Fìge/ Fig Tree	Duncan Gillies	Winner	
2022	Companion Piece	Ali Smith	Shortlist	
2022	Confessions of a Highland Art Dealer	Tony Davidson	Shortlist	
2022	WAH! Things I Never Told My Mother	Cynthia Rogerson	Shortlist	
2021	The Stone Age	Jen Hadfield	Winner	
2021	Slaves and Highlanders	David Alston	Shortlist	
2021	Islands of Abandonment	Cal Flyn	Shortlist	
2021	In a Veil of Mist	Donald S. Murray	Shortlist	
2020	The Changing Outer Hebrides: Galson and the Meaning of Place	Frank Rennie	Winner	
2020	The Nature of Summer	Jim Crumley	Shortlist	
2020	To The Lake: A Journey of War and Peace	Kapka Kassabova	Shortlist	
2020	Summer	Ali Smith	Shortlist	
2019	The Frayed Atlantic Edge: A Historian’s Journey from Shetland to the Channel	David Gange	Winner	
2019	Surfacing	Kathleen Jamie	Winner	
2019	Spring	Ali Smith	Winner	
2019	Moder Dy	Roseanne Watt	Winner	
2018	Now We Shall Be Entirely Free	Andrew Miller	Winner	
2018	The Assynt Crofter: Allan MacRae, A Life	Judith Ross Napier	Shortlist	
2018	The Last Wilderness: A Journey Into Silence	Neil Ansell	Shortlist	
2018	The Valley at the Centre of the World	Malachy Tallack	Shortlist	
2017	Border: A Journey to the Edge of Europe	Kapka Kassabova	Winner	
2017	The Finest Road in the World	James Miller	Shortlist	
2017	The Angel in the Stone	R.L. McKinney	Shortlist	
2017	The Potter's Tale: A Colonsay Life	Dion Alexander	Shortlist	
