= March, Strathspey and Reel =

The March, Strathspey and Reel or MSR is a set of tunes consisting of a march, a strathspey and a reel, three different simple time metres.

== Competition format ==
It is a common format in light music solo bagpiping and pipe band competitions.

Sometimes the march is played separately from the strathspey and reel.

The contrast between the time signatures is an important feature of the MSR.

The other common format for pipe band competitions is the medley.
