= Gold Medal (piping) =

In competitive solo bagpiping, a Gold Medal is awarded at the Northern Meeting and Argyllshire Gathering for pibroch playing. The prize is one of the most prestigious awards a solo player can receive, and by winning it a player qualifies for a number of restricted competitions.

== History ==
The Highland Society of London donated both of the prizes, which are awarded annually.

== Eligibility ==
The Gold Medal at each event can only be won once, and winning it qualifies the holder for a range of other events.

In order to compete for the Gold Medal, a player must qualify.

== Winners ==
Eight players in history have won both of the Gold Medals in the same year.

In 1950 John D. Burgess became the youngest ever winner of the Gold Medals for piobaireachd at both the Argyllshire Gathering in Oban and the Northern Meeting in Inverness, at the age of 16.

In 2010, Faye Henderson won the Highland Society of London Gold Medal at the Argyllshire Gathering in Oban, becoming the first woman to win the award either in Oban or at the Northern Meeting in Inverness. Aged 18, she also became one of the youngest ever winners of a Gold Medal, playing "Lament for Donald Duaghal MacKay".
