= Argyllshire Gathering =

Highland games in Oban, Scotland

- Host city: Oban, Scotland
- Organiser: The Argyllshire Gathering Trust
- Events: Highland Dance competitions: Gille Chaluim; Seann Triubhas; Highland Fling; Reel; Piping competition: Piobaireachd; Ceòl beag; Strathspey
- Dates: late August
- Main venue: Mossfield Stadium
- Website: Official website

The Argyllshire Gathering is a Highland games held in Oban, Scotland.

== History ==
A meeting on 23 August 1871 held at the Argyll Arms Hotel led to a resolution to have an "Annual Gathering of the Gentry of the County of Argyll for social purposes". This was to be called the Argyllshire Gathering and was funded by member subscriptions. The first Gathering was held in 1873.

The Highland Society of London donated a Gold Medal, which along with the Gold Medal also donated to the Northern Meeting is one of the most prestigious prizes in solo piping. Faye Henderson won the Gold Medal in 2010, becoming the first woman to win the Gold Medal at either Oban or Inverness.

The Argyllshire Gathering Halls are at a site on Breadalbane Street in Oban, and were built to accommodate the ball held after the gathering. The current building is a category C listed building built towards the end of the 19th century to replace a timber structure.

The Gathering is normally held in late August, one or two weeks before the Northern Meeting in Inverness. Many pipers come to Scotland to compete in both events.

== Piping competition ==
Eligibility for the Senior competitions is decided by a Joint Eligibility Committee, comprising representatives of the Northern Meeting, the Argyllshire Gathering, competition judges and the Competing Pipers Association. Competitors must enter themselves each year, and hear in March whether they have been accepted.

On the day after the piping competitions the competitors form a band and march through the town as part of the Stewards' March.

== See also ==
- List of winners of the Gold Medal, Senior Piobaireachd and Former Winners' MSR at the Argyllshire Gathering
