= Northern Meeting =

Bagpiping competition in Scotland

The Northern Meeting is a gathering held in Inverness, Scotland, best known for its solo bagpiping competition in September.

== History ==
The Northern Meeting was set up in 1798 "for the purpose of promoting a Social Intercourse", and early editions featured dinners, balls, concerts, and horse races.

"An exhibition of Pipers and Dancers" was included in the 1841 meeting, and in 1848 the Highland Society of London donated a Gold Medal, after their own piping competition ceased in 1844.

In 1789 the Northern Meeting built its own rooms on the corner of Church Street and Baron Taylor's Street, and in 1864 the Northern Meeting Park in the centre of Inverness was established as a venue for the Highland Games. The Highland Games ceased to be run by the members of the Northern Meeting with the onset of World War II, and in 1946 the Northern Meeting Park was sold to Inverness Burgh Council who took over responsibility for running the Games and renamed it "The Inverness Highland Games" The rooms were sold in 1962 and since then the Ball and piping competitions have been held in venues around Inverness, except for between 2005 and 2007 when the piping competition was held in Aviemore due to the renovation of Eden Court Theatre.

The site of the former Northern Meeting Ballroom is now occupied by the Rendezvous Cafe; the ballroom hosted the Silver Beatles, later known as The Beatles, on 21 May 1960.

In 1926 there were 850 people attending the ball. The bicentenary in 1988 was celebrated with a week of events reminiscent of earlier gatherings, with the centre-piece being a ball at Beaufort Castle attended by 1000 people.

The piping competition is currently held in early September, one or two weeks after the Argyllshire Gathering in Oban. Many pipers come to Scotland to compete in both events. Other events throughout the year include reel parties, cocktail parties and lunches.

== Piping competition ==
The annual solo bagpiping competitions at the Northern Meeting are among the most prestigious in the calendar, especially the competition for the Gold Medal donated by the Highland Society of London. A maximum of between 25 and 35 pipers are in each competition.

The Senior piping competitions consist of three pibroch competitions and five light music competitions. The pibroch competitions are for the Gold Medal, the Silver Medal, and the Clasp for former winners of the Gold Medal. For light music, there are March, Strathspey and Reel competitions for A and B grades as well as one for former winners, and A and B grade Hornpipe and Jig competitions.

Eligibility for the Senior competitions is decided by a Joint Eligibility Committee, comprising representatives of the Northern Meeting, the Argyllshire Gathering, competition judges and the Competing Pipers Association.

There are also Junior competitions, with piobaireach and March, Strathspey and Reel (MSR) for under 15 and under 18 age grades.
