= John Grant (pipe-major) =

Pipe Major John Grant FSAS
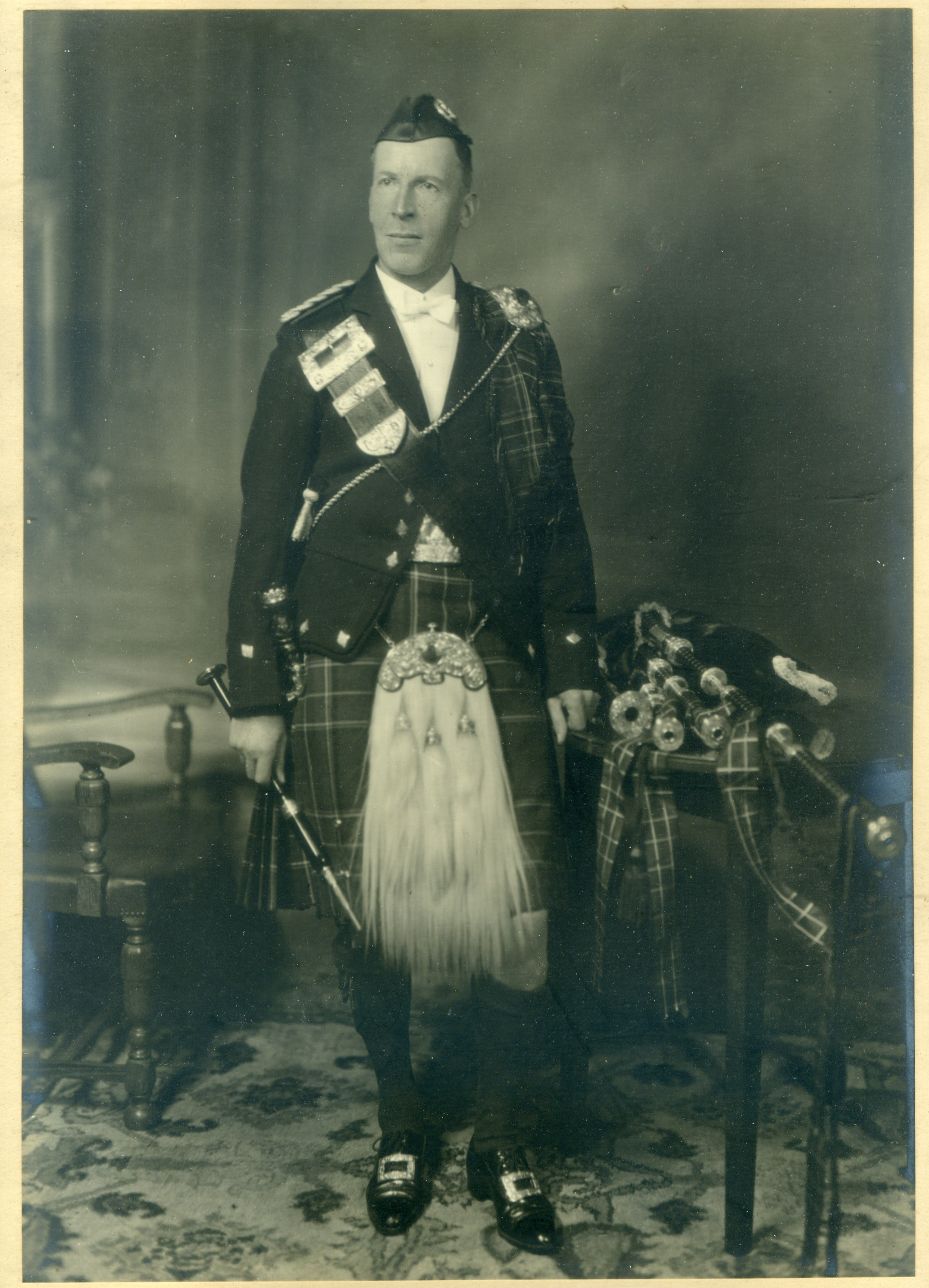
- Pipe Major John Grant c.1911

Background information
- Born: 11 August 1876; Near Kellas, Moray
- Died: 25 April 1961 (aged 84)
- Instrument: Bagpipes
- Website: https://pmjohngrant.com/

John Grant FSA Scot (11 August 1876 – 25 April 1961) was an amateur aficionado of the Great Highland bagpipe who, for over fifty years, composed piobaireachd and Ceòl Beag for members of the British royal family, important noblemen and women, and contemporary statesmen; wrote and published books on the Great Highland Bagpipe and its music; and taught students under the auspices of the [Royal] Scottish Piper's Society.

== Early life ==
John Grant was the sixth child and fourth son of George Grant and Eliza (Elisabeth) Roy Grant, who resided in "The Bauds" on a hillside outside of the settlement of Kellas, near Dallas and Elgin, Scotland. At 17 years of age John left the farm for Elgin in order to begin a career in law. Within six months he obtained a position as a law clerk with Messrs. Stewart and McIsaac, Solicitors. Needing a hobby to occupy his leisure hours, he took up bagpiping, walking eleven miles one way twice a week to Gordon Castle in order to study with renowned Pipe-Major Ronald MacKenzie. By the summer of 1898, after only two years of study, Grant had become accomplished enough on the bagpipes to win the gold medal in a competition that fielded thirty-three entrants. In late August, Ronald MacKenzie recommended Grant to William Stirling-Home-Drummond-Moray, Laird of Abercairny (Crieff), who was seeking a full-time family piper for the Abercairny Estate. Grant accepted the position, serving in the post from October 1898 until May 1902.

== The Royal Collection of Piobaireachd ==
Grant left the employ of the Laird in May 1902 in order to resume work in the legal profession. He moved to Edinburgh, and became clerk to his old supervisor from Messrs. Stewart and McIsaacs, Mr. A.S. Stoddart, Leith. Shortly thereafter he took up employment as a cash clerk, overseeing the entire payroll operation of the North British Rubber Company, Edinburgh. Grant married Mary Jane Harper (26 October 1869 – 13 December 1963) at Auchterless on 12 June 1903. The couple set up housekeeping for a time with John's spinster sisters at 5 Athole Place, then moved into their own apartment at 21 Murieston Crescent.

Perhaps as a requirement for his employment as a legal clerk, Grant became skilled in calligraphy. His bagpipe teacher, Ronald MacKenzie, had impressed upon Grant early on in his tutelage the importance of copying and preserving ancient piobaireachd and Grant, as early as 1900, began compiling manuscripts of the "classical music of the bagpipe", for disseminating among those who were interested in them. Several such collections made their ways into the hands of members of the Highland Society of London and the newly-formed Piobaireachd Society. Because of the praise these organizations lavished on Grant for his exquisite workmanship, he decided to try his own hand at piobaireachd composition. Combining his talent for calligraphy with his knowledge of piobaireachd, on 20 July 1906 he composed "His Most Excellent Majesty King Edward VII's Salute," then prepared it as a beautifully-illuminated presentation folio to lay before the King. Edward VII graciously accepted the tune dedicated to him, thereby, in essence, granting John Grant license to do the same for others among the Royal Family, the nobility, and those of renown whom he deemed worthy of such an honor. By September 1907 Grant had composed, prepared in illuminated manuscript, and sent for acceptance, five more "royal" piobaireachds, all of which were gratefully accepted, either by those to whom they were dedicated, or a representative. In May 1908, in order to make them available to the public, he published—at his own expense--The Royal Collection of Piobaireachd: Besides the "Salute" written in honor of King Edward VII, the work included "His Royal Highness The Duke of Connaught's Salute" (i.e., Prince Arthur, Duke of Connaught and Strathearn) "Lament For Her Most Excellent Majesty Queen Victoria", "His Grace The Duke of Fife's Salute", "Lord Archibald Campbell's Salute", and "The Piobaireachd Society's Salute". The work had over 160 subscribers, including those to whom the tunes were dedicated, other royals, and individuals from all walks of life, including such personages as Baron Strathcona and Mount Royal.

Grant considered the first edition so successful he published a second in March 1911, adding fifteen more tunes to the six of the first edition. The additional tunes, in chronological order of composition, were:

Date composed	Title	Reason for dedication
05/16/1909	Salute for Sir George Alexander Cooper, Bart	Cooper was a native of Elgin, Morayshire, who had donated land and funds for a town park. He was made Baronet of Hursley, County of Southampton on 26 July 1905, and lived with his extremely wealthy American wife, the former Mary Emma Smith, at 24 Grosvenor Square in London (the future location of the American Embassy) next door to Lord Strathcona. During the Great War Cooper donated £2,600,000 to the British War Chest.
08/08/1929	Salute to the Marquise of Stafford	Composed for George Sutherland-Leveson-Gower, 5th Duke of Sutherland, known until 1913 as the Marquess of Stafford, as a celebration of his Lordship's coming of age on 29 August.
09/20/1909	Colonel John MacRae-Gilstrap of Ballimore's Salute	John MacRae-Gilstrap, the owner of Eilean Donan Castle at the time, was brother of Captain Colin William MacRae, a founding member of the Piobaireachd Society, life-time military man, and a close friend of John Grant. The MacRae family did much to encourage John Grant's bagpiping endeavors, and he repaid them with his own compositions in their honor.
11/04/1909	Salute to Captain W. Home Drummond Moray of Abercairny	Captain William Home Drummond Moray was John Grant's employer from 1898 to 1902 when Grant served as Family Piper to the household at the Abercairny Estate in Crieff. Captain Moray thought highly of Grant, and provided kind references for him when Grant decided to return to the "outside world" for gainful employment.
11/18/1909	Captain John Campbell of Kilberry's Salute	John Campbell of Kilberry was Archibald Campbell's eldest brother, a founding member of the Piobaireachd Society, and a piper. Although only a member of the "landed gentry,' the Campbell's of Kilberry were uppermost among the bagpiping intelligencia, and Grant wanted their approval of his offerings in its music.
11/20/1909	Lament for the Earl of Dunmore	Charles Adolphus Murray, 7th Earl of Dunmore, was a past President of the Highland Society of London (1876) who took a keen interest in "everything Highland", as Grant would write in his dedication, including "the fostering of bagpipe music, and the preservation of Piòb Mhòr."
12/10/1909	His Grace the Duke of Atholl's Salute	Composed for the father of Grant's friend and benefactor, the Marquis of Tullibardine. John James Hugh Henry Stewart-Murray, 7th Duke of Atholl was also third cousin to Lord William Home Drummond Moray of Abercairny. Grant wrote later that he composed this Salute in the Duke's honor "to mark his interests in the Highland Bagpipe and its music by having a piper in his household for many years.
04/19/1910	The Earl of Seafield's Salute	Composed for James Ogilvie-Grant, 11th Earl of Seafield, and Chief of Clan Grant. The Earl took possession of the Seafield Estates early in the year, and, being his own Clan Chief, John Grant decided to honor His Lordship with his own tune.
05/06/1910	Lament for His Most Excellent Majesty King Edward VII	On 6 May 1910, King Edward VII died at Buckingham Palace after suffering several heart attacks after a bout with acute bronchitis. Grant composed a Lament for him that very day, prepared it for presentation, and sent it off to George V, who received it.
05/20/1910	His Grace The Duke of Hamilton's Salute	Alfred Douglas-Hamilton, 13th Duke of Hamilton, was a famed Navy Lieutenant who, in May 1910 was comfortably situated with his wife and growing family at famed Hamilton Palace in South Lanarkshire, considered to be one of the finest palaces in the country. Douglas maintained a family piper, and in Grant's eyes, that made him fit to be honored with a royal Salute.
06/01/1910	His Most Excellent Majesty King George V Salute	The dedication of the composition, which the King accepted, reads: "to commemorate his ascension to the British throne, and as a tribute to his continued Royal patronage and encouragement of Highland Bagpipe playing in the Royal household."
08/12/1910	Salute to the Marquis(sic) of Bute	John Crichton-Stuart, 4th Marquess of Bute was the next younger brother of Margaret MacRae, Sir Colin MacRae's wife. He was a collector of piobaireachd and maintained a piper in his household, and for both of those, Grant wanted to honor him with a royal tune.
09/05/1910	Lord Lovat's Salute	The impending wedding of Sir Simon Fraser, 14th Lord Lovat, to Laura Lister, daughter of Thomas Lister, 4th Baron Ribblesdale, offered Grant a reason to compose another royal Salute. Lovat would later send Grant a short note saying "my wife and I appreciate the Pibroch you sent us very much, and we often hear it both on the pipes and as arranged for the piano."
10/12/1910	Sir Colin MacRae of Feoirlinn's Salute	Grant composed this tune for his good friend, Sir Colin MacRae "in recognition of his interests in Ceòl Mór and his work in connection with the Piobaireachd Society for which he acted as its Secretary for a number of years."
01/12/1911	Lament for Sir Alan Colquhoun of Colquhoun of Luss	On 3 July 1906 Sir Colin MacRae's sister, Anna Helena, married Lieutenant-Colonel Sir Alan John Colquhoun of Luss, one of the Colquhoun baronets: an officer in the 42nd Royal Highlanders (Black Watch) and 16th Lancers. He was 68; she was 48. In the December following his death on 14 March 1910, Colin MacRae requested Grant to compose a piobaireachd to honor his brother-in-law. It is the first composition on record that Grant was commissioned to write.

== Piobaireachd: Its Origin and Construction ==
Following successful publications of both editions of The Royal Collection of Piobaireachd, Grant decided to tackle the genre in a more comprehensive manner. The result was a 183-page volume entitled Piobaireachd: Its Origin and Construction. published at the author's expense by Aird & Coghill, Limited, Glasgow sometime in August, 1915. Known also by its Gaelic title Tus is Alt à Chiuil-Mhoir, Piobaireachd: Its Origin and Construction (hereafter POC) had an impressive list of patrons and subscribers, including King George V and Queen Mary of Teck, Queen Alexandra of Denmark, the Prince of Wales, various other royals, nobles, and members of high society, and the Highland Society of London. The book received good reviews from Grant's contemporaries. Modern reviews, however, tend to be mixed. In his "Introduction" to the 1974 reprint of The Pipes of War, referencing POC, Major General Frank Richardson wrote:

This book cannot in all honesty be recommended today. Some useful information for those who want to know about our instrument, its music and some Highland traditions and legends can be found there, but its good points are embedded in much indigestible matter, like currants in what our generation of Servicemen called a 'Nafty cake.'

On the other hand, Pipe-Major Roger Huth (The Surrey Pipe Band), Vice President of the Scottish Piping Society of London, former member of the Scots Guards, and an esteemed piper, had much to praise about the book in a 2006 review:

It is soon apparent when reading through the pages of his book, that John Grant was also a man of considerable intellect. His knowledge appears to be no shallow pool as he explains to his reader the poetry of Piobaireachd as well as how the MacCrimmon Clan and others through the years constructed their compositions. He also explains the theory of music as it appertains to the Scottish Bagpipe and I strongly suspect that those who created their own Bagpipe Schools during the 20th Century, including the Army at Edinburgh Castle, leant on this book heavily.

Despite Grant's tendency to be overly Romantic in his prose, the book remains a classic. The first of its kind, it still remains the largest compendium of articles on topics relating to the "National" music of Scotland in bagpipe literature.
