= Angus MacKay (piper) =

Scottish bagpipe player

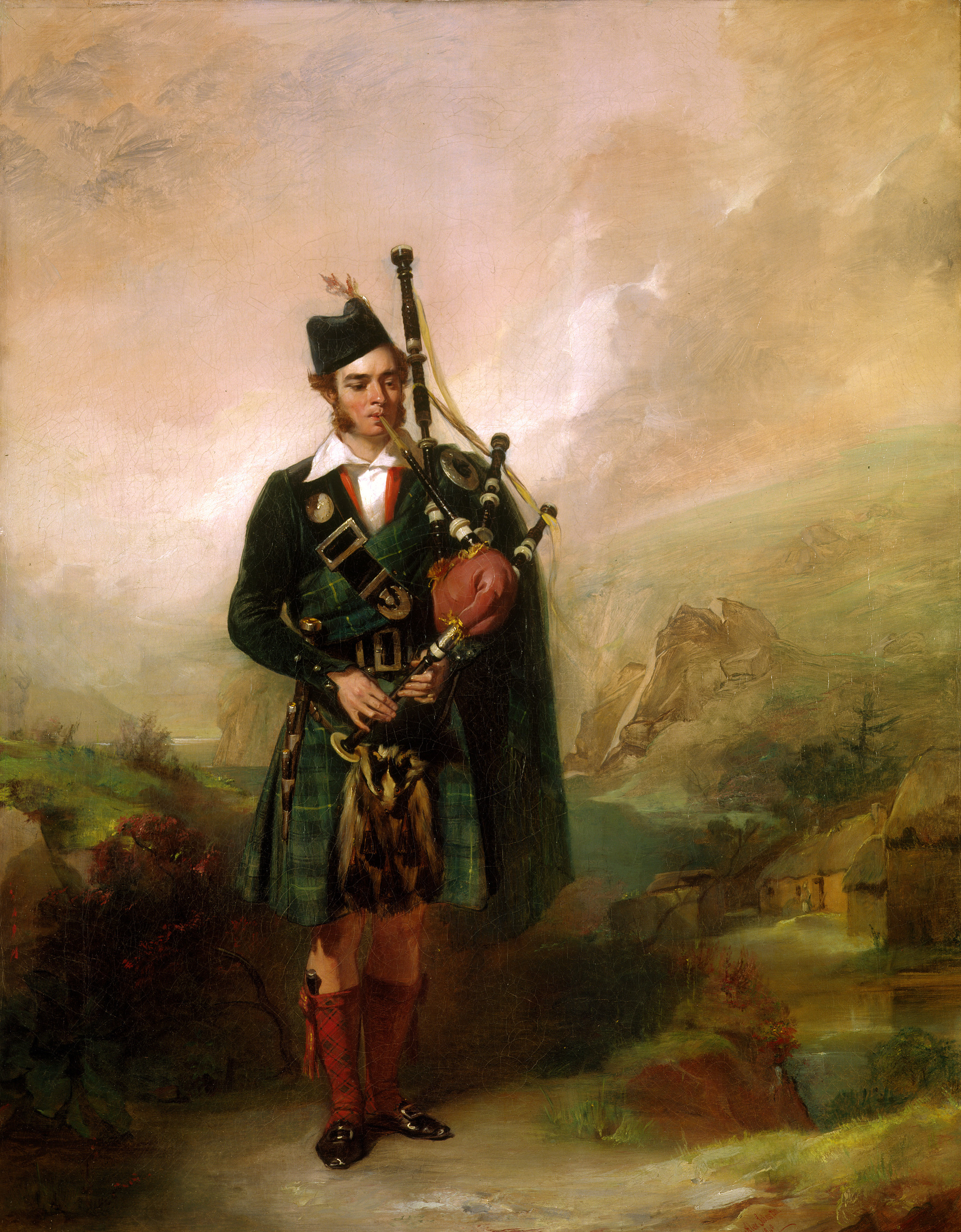
- Portrait by Alexander Johnston

Background information
- Born: 10 September 1813; Isle of Raasay?
- Died: 21 March 1859 (aged 45)
- Instrument: Great Highland Bagpipe

Angus MacKay (10 September 1813 – 21 March 1859) was a Scottish bagpipe player and the first Piper to the Sovereign. He wrote collections of pibroch and ceol beag written in staff notation, which became the basis for standardised settings of music which had previously been shared by singing of canntaireachd.

== Life ==
=== Early life ===
He was born on 10 September 1813, to Margaret and John MacKay. According to the Oxford Dictionary of National Biography he was most likely born on the Isle of Raasay, although this is not known for certain. His three brothers played the pipes, and his father, John MacKay of Raasay, was a leading composer and player. John MacKay had been taught by the MacCrimmons of Skye, and as well as his own sons taught other players including John Bàn Mackenzie, Angus Macpherson, and Donald Cameron.

After considering emigrating to America, the family moved to Drummond Castle near Crieff in 1823, as Angus' father John became piper to Peter Drummond-Burrell, 22nd Baron Willoughby de Eresby.

=== Piper ===
He became piper first to Sarah, wife of Peter Drummond-Burrell, and then successively to Davidson of Tulloch and Campbell of Islay. In 1835 he won the gold medal in the Edinburgh piping competition; an event organized by the Highland Societies of London and Scotland. From 1843 until 1854 he was the first piper to Queen Victoria, and the first Piper to the Sovereign, a position which still exists.

=== Publications ===
Joseph MacDonald published a book on bagpipe music in around 1760, but he died in India and his manuscript did not gain widespread traction. Donald MacDonald's Collection of Ancient Martial Music of Caledonia called Piobaireachd, published around 1820, was the first major collection of bagpipe music in staff notation. After this a number of other collections of pibroch and light music were published.

With the backing of the Highland Society of London, MacKay published his book A Collection of Ancient Piobaireachd or Highland Bagpipe Music in 1838. A reworking of a collection of tunes originally published by William MacKay was published around 1843, and shortly after was expanded into The Piper's Assistant. MacKay also collected a set of tunes that has become known as the Seaforth Manuscript, it was not published but tunes from it appeared in works published by other people.

=== Later life ===
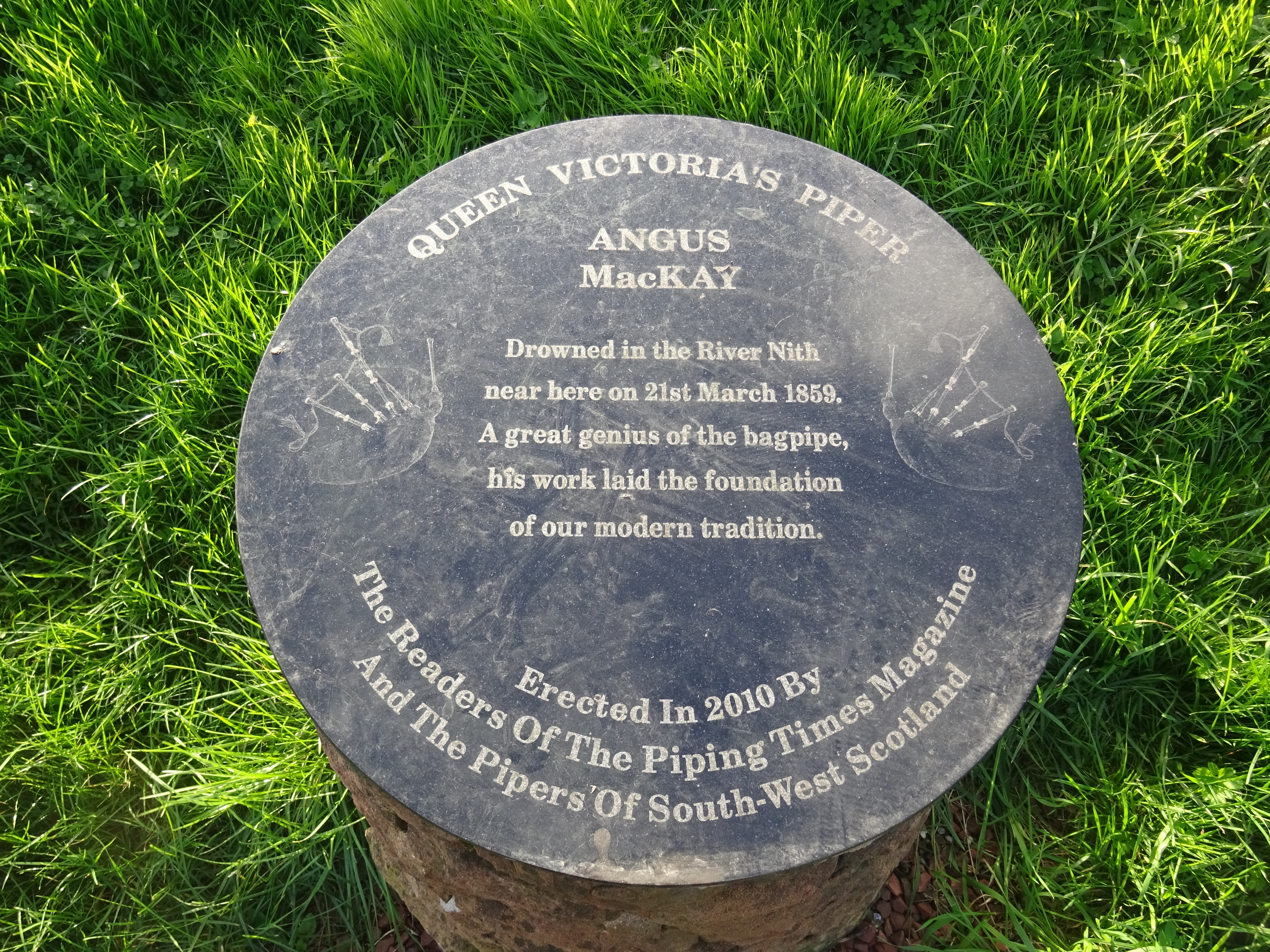
Memorial to Angus Mackay beside the River Nith

He married Mary Russell in Edinburgh in 1841, and they had two sons and two daughters.

He was admitted to Bethlem Royal Hospital in London, first in February 1854 for a stay of eight months, and then in November of that year for fifteen months. After his second stay at the Bethlem, he was transferred to the Crichton Royal Institution in Dumfries.

He died on 21 March 1859 after escaping from the Crichton Royal Institution, and is presumed to have drowned in the River Nith. In 2010, a memorial was placed at the site of his disappearance to commemorate his life.

== Musical influence ==
Angus MacKay's published books of pibroch became the basis for standardised settings of tunes in the 20th century. Pibroch had traditionally been shared by means of canntaireachd, but MacKay's standard settings cemented the way of playing his father had learned and allowed it to be shared more widely. Part of reason for their adoption may be the influence of the teaching of his father John MacKay.

He also had considerable influence on the collection of ceol beag or light music, through his publication of The Piper's Assistant. This contained a number of already published tunes, and of the 155 tunes in this collection, only 23 were published for the first time.

During his career there was significant development in the range and complexity of metres played and MacKay composed some of the first competition 2/4 marches of the kind that are played today, which evolved from the quickstep marches.

== Legacy ==
Alexander Johnston painted a portrait of MacKay in 1840, which hangs in the Scottish National Gallery. Several other portraits of him survive, making him one of the most-depicted pipers before the age of photography.

MacKay's life was dramatised in a book I Piped, That She Might Dance, written by Iain MacDonald and published in 2020.

== Music books ==
- A Collection of Ancient Piobaireachd or Highland Bagpipe Music
- The Piper’s Assistant
- Seaforth Manuscript (unpublished)
