= Brian Boru (disambiguation) =

Brian Boru was High King of Ireland from 1002 to 1014.

Brian Boru may also refer to:

- Brian Boru bagpipes, bagpipes based on the Great Highland bagpipe
- Brian Boru (horse), a thoroughbred racehorse
