= Great Irish warpipes =

Woodwind instrument native to Ireland

Irish warpipes
Woodwind
- Other names: Píob mhór
- Classification: Aerophone; Wind; Woodwind; Bagpipe
- Hornbostel–Sachs classification: Mixed: 422.122.2 & 422.221.1 (set of reed aerophones)
- Developed: 7th century

Related instruments
- Border pipes; Great Highland bagpipe; Northumbrian pipes; Pastoral pipes; Scottish smallpipes; Uilleann pipes

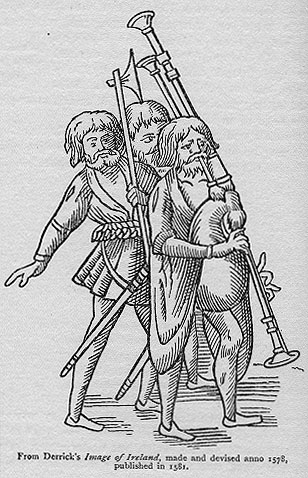
An Irish piper playing very large bagpipes, from a copy of a 1578 woodcut.

Irish warpipes (Irish: píob mhór; literally "great pipes") are an Irish analogue of the Scottish great Highland bagpipe. "Warpipes" is originally an English term. The first use of the Gaelic term in Ireland was recorded in a poem by Seán Ó Neachtain (c. 1650–1728), in which the bagpipes are referred to as píb mhór.

== History ==
One of the earliest references to the Irish bagpipes comes from an account of the funeral of Donnchadh mac Ceallach, king of Osraige in 927 CE. A likely first reference to bagpipes being played in war is found in a manuscript written between 1484 and 1487 containing an Irish Gaelic version of "Fierabras": the quote "sinnter adharca & píba agaibh do tionól bur sluaigh" translates as "let horns and pipes be played by you to gather your host". The first clear references to the Irish píob mhór relate to Henry VIII's siege of Boulogne. A muster roll of the "Kerne to be transported into Englaunde to serve the kinge" contains entries of various pipers attached to these forces, such as "The Baron of Delvene’s Kerne: Brene McGuntyre pyper". and according to an entry in Holinshed's Chronicles (1577) for May 1544, "In the same moneth also passed through the citie of London in warlike manner, to the number of seven hundred Irishmen, having for their weapons darts and handguns with bagpipes before them: and in St. James Park besides Westminster they mustered before the king."

In a 1581 volume, musician Vincenzo Galilei, the father of the astronomer Galileo, wrote that the bagpipe "is much used by the Irish: to its sound this unconquered fierce and warlike people march their armies and encourage each other to deeds of valor. With it they also accompany the dead to the grave making such sorrowful sounds as to invite, nay to compel the bystander to weep". In the same year, John Derricke published the poem "The Image of Ireland", in which the pipes are already used to convey signals in battle:

Now goe the foes to wracke
The Kerne apace doe sweate
And baggepype then instead of Trompe
Doe lull the back retreate

One famous description of the pipes from Richard Stanihurst's De Rebus Hibernicis (1586), reads as follows in English translation:

The Irish also use instead of a trumpet a wooden pipe constructed with the most ingenious skill to which a leather bag is attached with very closely plaited (or bound) leather bands. From the side of the skin issues a pipe through which as if through a tube the piper blows with swollen neck and distended cheeks, as it is filled with air the skin swells: when it swells he presses it down again with his arm. At this pressure two other wooden pipes, a shorter and a longer, emit a loud and piercing sound. There is also a fourth pipe, pierced with several holes which by opening and closing the holes with nimble fingers the piper manages to elicit from the upper pipes a loud or low sound as he thinks fit. The stem and stern of the whole affair is that the wind should have no outlet through any part of the bag except the mouths of the pipes. For if anyone (as is the practice of merrymakers when they want to give annoyance to these pipers) make even a pinhole in the skin the instrument is done for because the bag collapses. This sort of instrument is held among the Irish to be a whetstone for martial courage: for just as other soldiers are stirred by the sound of trumpets, so they are hotly stimulated to battle by the noise of this affair.

There are reports of the warpipes being played as recently as the Williamite War. When the exiled King James II arrived in Cork City in March 1689, he was greeted with “bagpipes and dancing, throwing their mantles under his horse’s feet”. On his way to the castle in Dublin, “the pipers of the several companies played the Tune of The King enjoys his own again”.

There are late-17th-century reports of peace-time use of the pipes, for example to play for hurling teams. For 18th century references, however, it is often difficult to tell whether the pipes referred to in a particular case are píob mhór or another instrument. There are a number of reports of pipers in Irish regiments of the British Army in the 18th century; for example, a Barney Thompson (reportedly of Hillsborough, County Down) is attested in Lord Rawdon's Volunteers of Ireland in New York in 1778. Information from a muster roll indicates that there was at least a Piper Barney Thompson in the regiment. However, Thompson seems to have played a bellows-blown (pastoral/Union) bagpipe, which could be sung to, and not a warpipe.

One way or another, by the 19th century, the Irish warpipes died out, or at least fell into obscurity. Perhaps the píob mhór, while played by a few individuals, came to be seen as mainly Scottish, the bellows-blown union or uilleann pipes being the new "Irish pipes". Business directories of Dublin in 1840 show a Maurice Coyne as a maker of Union and "Scotch" bagpipes at 41 James's Street.

== Modern instrument ==
In the second half of the 19th century, however, the general revival of Irish nationalism and Gaelic culture seems to have coincided with a return of the popularity of the warpipes. The art picked up again until the pipes achieved considerable popularity in both military and civilian use. Today, pipe bands of essentially the same kind as the Highland form are a standard feature of British regiments with Irish honours and the Irish Defence Forces, and there are many local bands throughout both the Republic and Northern Ireland. The Irish warpipes as played today are one and the same as the Scottish great Highland bagpipe.

Attempts in the past to make a distinct instrument for Irish pipers have not proved popular in the long run. In the first half of the 20th century, it was very common to play pipes with only one tenor drone; the reason for this is discussed below. Several attempts were made to improve the pipes; the most successful was the London pipe maker Starck's "Brian Boru" bagpipe, with a keyed chanter that could play a full range of traditional music and a baritone drone, often held with the tenor and bass in a common stock. Such pipes are produced by few makers today and are played by only a minority of pipers.

== Surviving evidence for the original Irish Warpipe tradition ==
The notion that Irish warpipes were a clearly distinct instrument from the Scottish Highland bagpipe before the revival is based on evidence which may be suspect. The main problem when comparing the instrument in Scotland and Ireland lies in determining such technical points as the number of drones and the tuning of the old Irish pipes. Unfortunately, no early instruments that would provide material evidence are known to survive. Nevertheless, there are several reasons to believe that the old Irish and Scottish pipes were more or less the same instrument. For one thing, Scottish and Irish culture were not isolated, and artistic and musical trends could be copied and shared. At the 1785 Highland Society of London piping competition, piper John MacPherson played "Piobrachd Ereanach an Irish pibrach", and it is quite possible that at least some of this "typically Scottish" piping music (piobaireachd, the "classical music of the Highland bagpipe") comes from Ireland.

The missal painting

Some illustrations of Irish mouth-blown pipes do exist, but these are largely rough or inaccurate. Among the native Irish depictions of the instrument is a c. 16th-century painting in the margin of a missal of the Abbey of Rosgall, County Kildare, and now in the Bodleian Library, showing a piper playing an instrument with two drones and a chanter in the usual positions. The drones are of unequal length and all pipes have flaring Medieval-style bell ends. Otherwise, however, the picture is quite rough and unrealistically proportioned.

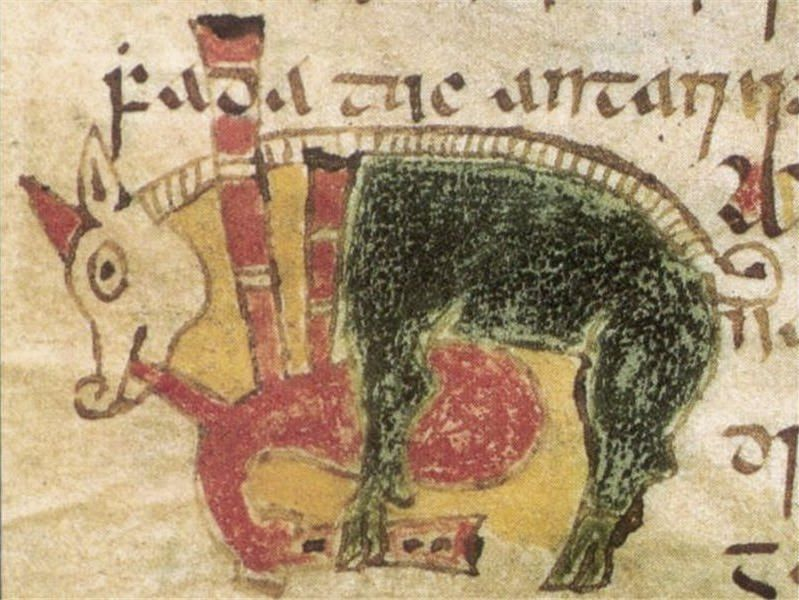
The pig piper from the Dinnseanchus 1300?

Another illustration coming directly from Ireland is found in a possibly 16th-century, although that date has never been put under scrutiny and the actual date maybe closer to the 14th century, manuscript of a dinnseanchus, an Irish topographical history, which contains an initial letter in the form of a pig playing the pipes. The instrument has two drones, one clearly a bass and one shorter. The chanter and drones seem to slightly bell out at the end. The illustration looks relatively "normal" in configuration, but is still sketchy enough that no further details can be deduced from it.

Lucas DeHeere's boy piper; his pipes are similar to those depicted in "Image of Ireland".

Most period images of the Irish piob mhor from outside Ireland are similar enough to have to stem from a common source. They include an illustration from around 1575 by Lucas DeHeere. Now in the library of the University of Ghent, it bears the caption "Irish Folk as they were attired in the reign of the late King Henry", and shows a group of people which includes a boy playing a bagpipe. There are again two drones, apparently in a common stock, and a large chanter, all of which end with flaring bell ends. The bag is very bulbous, and its position is odd; it appears to be held under the piper's right arm, but the drones go over the piper's left shoulder. Although this is our best-done illustration, the instrument may not depict an authentic Irish warpipe, but rather a German/Low Countries "dudelsack", such as would have been more familiar to the painter, who may have copied it from a source common with one of the engravings illustrating Derricke's "Image of Ireland."

Despite the fact that these and other 16th-century sources show two-droned pipes, the modification in the 20th century of Highland pipes by Irish pipers who omitted one tenor seems to be a mistake in terms of making the pipes "more Irish". At the time those descriptions were made, the Scottish counterpart would also have had no more than two drones; at any rate, there seems to be no evidence that there was a third drone until well into the 17th century. Indeed, a pig piper similar to the one in the dinnseanchus with two drones exists in a 16th-century Scottish psalter. Like the missal picture, this too is roughly executed. There is nothing in any of these images that could be identified as a specifically "Irish" or "Scottish" feature of the pipes depicted.
