= Piper to the Sovereign =

Position in the British Royal Household

The Piper to the Sovereign (Scottish Gaelic: Pìobaire an Uachdarain), more commonly known as the King's Piper (Pìobaire an Rìgh) or Queen's Piper (Pìobaire a' Bhanrighe), is a position in the British Royal Household in which the holder of the office is responsible for playing the bagpipes at the Sovereign's request.

== History ==
The position was established in 1843 when Queen Victoria and Prince Albert visited John Campbell, 2nd Marquess of Breadalbane, at Taymouth Castle the previous year and discovered that the Marquess had his own personal piper. The Queen was taken with the idea of having one for herself, writing to her mother, the Dowager Duchess of Kent:

We have heard nothing but bagpipes since we have been in the beautiful Highlands and I have become so fond of it that I mean to have a Piper, who can if you like it, pipe every night at Frogmore.

The office has been held continuously since then, apart from a brief interruption during World War II. The piper's main duty is to play at 9 am for 15 minutes under the Sovereign's window, and on state occasions.

The first Piper to the Sovereign was Angus MacKay, a noted collector and publisher of piobaireachd. Every subsequent piper has been a serving non-commissioned officer and experienced pipe major (PM) from a Scottish regiment or an Irish Regiment. While the Piper is a member of the Royal Household, he retains his military rank for the duration of the secondment.

- 1843–1854: Angus MacKay
- 1854–1891: PM William Ross, 42nd Highlanders (Black Watch)
- 1891–1910: PM James Campbell, 42nd Highlanders (Black Watch)
- 1910–1941: PM Henry Forsyth, Scots Guards
- 1941–1945: None
- 1945–1965: PM Alexander MacDonald, Scots Guards
- 1965–1973: PM Andrew Pitkeathly, Argyll and Sutherland Highlanders
- 1973–1980: PM David Caird, Royal Highland Fusiliers
- 1980–1995: PM Brian MacRae, Gordon Highlanders
- 1995–1998: PM Gordon Webster, Scots Guards
- 1998–2003: PM Jim Motherwell, Argyll and Sutherland Highlanders
- 2003–2006: PM Jim Stout, The Highlanders, 1st Battalion
- 2006–2008: PM Alastair Cuthbertson, 1st Battalion, Royal Scots
- 2008–2012: PM Derek Potter RVM, Royal Scots Dragoon Guards
- 2012–2015: PM David Rodgers, Irish Guards
- 2015–2019: PM Scott Methven, Royal Regiment of Scotland
- 2019–2021: PM Richard Grisdale RVM, Royal Regiment of Scotland
- 2021–2025: PM Paul Burns RVM, Royal Regiment of Scotland
- 2025–present: PM Andrew Reid, Royal Regiment of Scotland

== See also ==
- Piper to the Queen Mother
