= Practice goose =

A practice goose is a small bag used when learning to play the Great Highland Bagpipe.

Generally, bagpipe students begin learning on a practice chanter, which is aspirated directly by the player blowing into it. Eventually, as one becomes more proficient, one may switch to a practice goose, which is a small air bladder (significantly smaller than that of a full set of pipes) with only a blowpipe and a single outlet to the chanter. The goose may or may not come equipped with a chanter; if not, the player supplies their own chanter. Unlike the full bagpipes, the practice goose does not have drones.
