= Ceòl meadhonach =

Music genre

Ceòl meadhonach (pronounced [kʲʰɔl̪ˠ ˈmia.anəx]) is the Gaelic-language term for "middle music", which in bagpiping includes such forms as slow airs and jigs. The genre thus includes "tunes as are neither constructed to the measure of piobaireachd, nor adapted to the quick march or dance".

== See also ==
- Ceòl beag
