= Piper to the Queen Mother =

Position in the British Royal Household

The Piper to the Queen Mother was a position in the British Royal Household in which the holder of the office was responsible for playing the bagpipes at the request of Queen Elizabeth the Queen Mother. The position was established in 1953 and disbanded in 2002 following her death.

The first Piper to the Queen Mother was Leslie de Laspee, Pipe Sergeant of the London Scottish of which the Queen Mother was honorary colonel. Soon afterwards he was appointed Pipe Major. Subsequently, the position was held by the then current Pipe Major of the London Scottish.

The principal duty was to play in the gardens of Clarence House at 9 am for 15 minutes on three mornings per week, and at state events as requested. There was no payment for these duties and the appointment was considered to be an honour.

The pipers holding the position were:

- 1953–1975: P/Sgt (later PM) Leslie de Laspee
- 1975–1985: PM D. Duncan
- 1985–1990: PM John Spoore
- 1990–1999: PM Ian King
- 1999–2001: PM Christopher Macpherson
- 2001–2002: PM John Bracken

Pipe Majors Spoore and Macpherson played at the Queen Mother's funeral in 2002.

Pipe Major Leslie de Laspee played the role of private Bill Millin in the Holywood film The Longest Day (1962). Bill Millin (1922–2010), who was personal piper to Simon Fraser, 15th Lord Lovat, commander of 1 Special Service Brigade at D-Day, is best remembered for playing the pipes whilst under fire during the D-Day landing in Normandy.

== See also ==
- Piper to the Sovereign
