= The Piper's Warning to His Master =

The Piper's Warning to His Master (a.k.a. A Cholla mo rún or colla mo rún) is a pibroch.

In the accompanying legend, the story is associated with the father of Alasdair Mac Colla, Colla Ciotach, and the castles Duntrune and Dunyvaig. It is said that after Clan Campbell captured Duntrune castle, a Ciotach loyalist and piper played this tune to warn Ciotach away from the castle where an ambush awaited him. The pibroch traditionally contains 6 verses with variations on lyrics and themes relating to different aspects of the legend.

In one version the pipes themselves (as opposed to a human voice) were said to relay the following message:

A Cholla, mo rún, seachain an dún,
Tha mise an laimh, tha mise an laimh,
A Cholla, mo ghaol, seachain an caol,
Tha mise an laimh, tha mise an laimh.

In another, the piper was sent into the captured castle as a spy, playing a war cry for Ciotach which encompassed only the first line of the longer quote. In yet another, the Campbells attempted to lure Ciotach towards the castle with cattle, which is referenced in the verse Fag an ni.

At the end of the story the piper was subsequently tortured with his fingers being cut off.
