= Reel pipes =

Musical instrument similar to Bagpipes

Reel pipes (also known as a half set, kitchen or parlour pipes) are a type of bagpipe originating in England and Scotland. These pipes are generally a scaled-down version of the large Great Highland pipes. Reel pipes are generally quieter than the Great Highland pipes, so suitable for indoor play.

The reelpipes have a conical bore (similar to the Great Highland pipes or Border pipes, unlike the Scottish smallpipe's parallel bore), and are generally pitched in the key of A or Bb.

== See also ==
- Music of Scotland
