= Canntaireachd =

Scottish music teaching method

Canntaireachd (Scottish Gaelic for 'chanting'; pronounced [ˈkʰãũn̪ˠt̪ɛɾʲəxk]) is the ancient method of teaching, learning and memorizing Piobaireachd (also spelt Pibroch), a type of music primarily played on the Great Highland bagpipe. In the canntairached method of instruction, the teacher sings or hums the tune to the pupil, sometimes using specific syllables which signify the sounds to be produced by the bagpipe.

== History ==
It appears that written staff notation began to come into use for bagpiping in the late 1700s or early 1800s. Seumas MacNeill, founder of The College of Piping, puts the date at 1803; The Piobaireachd Society holds that this occurred earlier, in the latter half of the eighteenth century. Prior to that time, instructors had to use other methods for teaching bagpipe tunes to students: by singing in canntaireachd, by playing the pipes for the student, or most likely a combination of both methods.

=== The Campbell (Nether Lorn) canntaireachd ===
Efforts were made to translate the vocal tradition into written form. The earliest known written collection dates to the early 1790s. It was written by Colin Mòr Campbell of Nether Lorn parish in Argyll. While Campbell's system had its origins in chanted notation, his Campbell Canntaireachd is now viewed as written documentation, to be read rather than sung. Author William Donaldson noted: "Although Campbell's work was almost immediately superseded by a form of staff notation adapted specifically for the pipe, and remained unpublished and unrecognised until well into the 20th Century, it remains an important achievement and gives valuable insight into the musical organisation" of piobaireachd music.

=== Other systems ===
Neil McLeod of Gesto also published a system of canntaireachd. It was reputedly based on the singing of John MacCrimmon, one of the last practicing members of that well-known piping family.

The MacArthur family of pipers are reported to have had their own oral form of canntaireachd, but it was not documented. A further variety of Canntaireachd and distinct collection of pibroch tunes was sourced from Simon Fraser, whose family emigrated to Melbourne in the 19th century. It is assumed that different lineages of pipers developed distinct forms of Canntaireachd that were variations on a broadly similar system of sung vocable notation.

== Canntaireachd in contemporary piping ==
For many instructors, singing, humming or somehow vocalizing remains the best means for conveying the subtleties of piobaireachd when teaching or rehearsing a tune. Major Archie Cairns, a noted piper, piping judge and instructor, maintains that pipers should sing or hum everything they play.

Competitive piper and instructor Jim McGillivray has said: "Though canntaireachd, the piper's language, is not used as widely now as it was in centuries past, pipers still do - and should - sing." This school of thought maintains that written scores, even those published by Angus MacKay in his Collection of Ancient Piobaireachd (1838), are oversimplified and cannot convey the nuances of proper musical expression.

As MacNeill noted: "There is a growing tendency, particularly among younger players... to place too much reliance on the printed score....The method of singing the tune is still of tremendous value, but it is not used often enough. Singing can bring out the nuances of expression in a tune, whereas staff (as every soloist knows) is limited, and must at times be very freely interpreted."

Canntaireachd also has value for the contemporary piper because it allows researchers to study older tunes exactly as they were published in the original collections. As McGillvray puts it, "There is a great deal of room for interpretation in cantairreachd translation... Some syllables can mean more than one thing. Experienced players may wish to look at the original canntairreachd version to see if they can find something new or different in it."

== Example of canntaireachd ==
Canntaireachd as originally designed consists of words which were invented to represent the sounds to be played. Vowels represent the melody notes, and consonants represent the grace notes and other embellishments. For example, depending on the context, the melody note E may be sung as "de" (pronounced "day") or "ay"; or if preceded by a G gracenote, as "che" or "shay." Embellishments played around melody notes have their own names, such as "hiharin" and "hihodin." There are a variety of books (including those referenced in this article) that explain in detail the names for the notes and embellishments.

There has been a trend towards moving away from the traditional names of the notes and syllables, in favour of using one's own terms where warranted, or simply humming wordlessly. Some believe that it does not matter whether the musician knows what syllables or words to use for each note or embellishment, and that any form of vocalization is sufficient. As McGillivray put it in his 2012 book: "When accomplished pipers sing piobaireachd, as they often do, they almost invariably use their own made-up syllables which sound much like the notes and grace notes being sung." Cairns gives an example in his book: "I don't feel the canntaireachd word, Hiharin, accurately/fully represents the number of syllables heard when the movement is played...I call this movement "Hiharin" but I teach and sing - "He a Tadadah.

Here are some examples of the bagpipe scale in Canntaireachd form. These are based on the vocables used by Calum Johnston in 1953.

Low g - um, im, hum, him, hun

Low A - un, in, hun, hin, chin, ro

B - o, ho, po, bo, do, ro

C - a, ha, pa, da

D - a, ha, pa, ra, e, he

E - u, hu, i, hi, ti, vi, dhi, p

F - e, i, vi

High G - e, i, vi

High A - i, chi

== See also ==
- Bagpipes
- Celtic music
- Scat singing
- Solfege
- Vocable

== Other sources ==
This article contains text from Edward Dwelly's Scottish Gaelic Dictionary (with minor corrections and additions) and Collins Encyclopedia of Scotland.
