= Kellas, Moray =

Coordinates: 57.572°N 3.389°W

Kellas: Scottish Gaelic: Ceallais
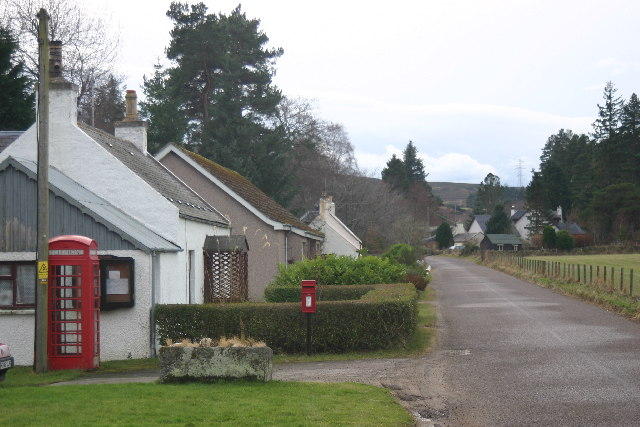
- Kellas, Moray

- Location within Moray
- OS grid reference: NJ170544
- Council area: Moray
- Lieutenancy area: Moray
- Country: Scotland
- Sovereign state: United Kingdom
- Post town: ELGIN
- Postcode district: IV30
- Police: Scotland
- Fire: Scottish
- Ambulance: Scottish
- UK Parliament: Moray
- Scottish Parliament: Moray

Kellas (Scottish Gaelic: Ceallais) is a village in Moray, Scotland. It is approximately 3 miles (5 km) northeast of Dallas on the B9010 road. The Kellas cat is named after the village.
