= Ceòl beag =

Music genre

Ceòl beag (pronounced [kʲʰɔl̪ˠ ˈpek]) is the Gaelic-language term for "light music", which in bagpiping includes such forms as marches, strathspeys, reels, jigs, polkas, slow airs, and hornpipes, as well as pipe tunes played in non-traditional idioms such as rock, punk, and jazz. The term is used in juxtaposition to ceòl mòr (translating literally as "big music" or "great music", as contrasted with ceòl beag, meaning "little music").

== See also ==
- Ceòl meadhonach
