= Practice chanter =

Woodwind musical instrument

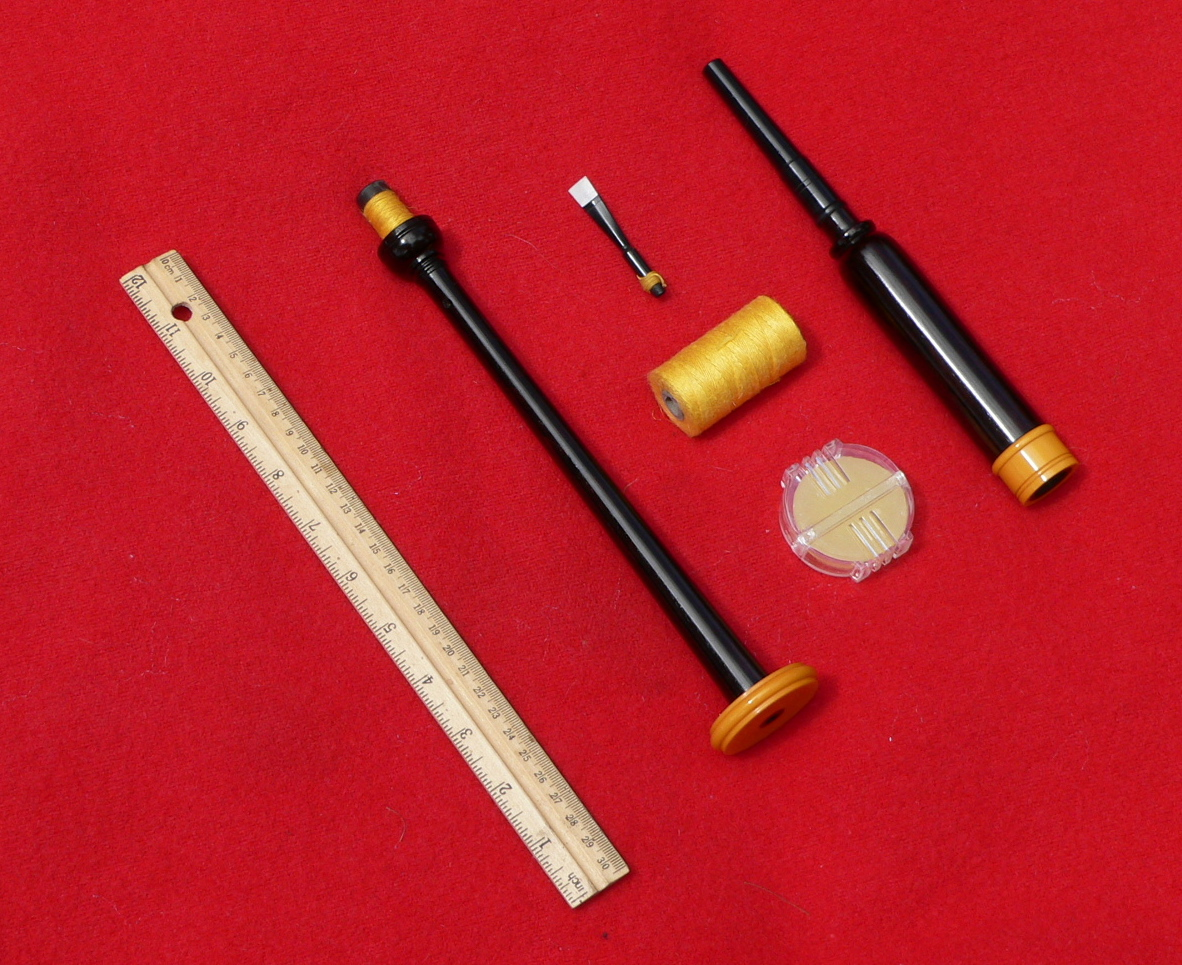
A practice chanter made out of African blackwood by R.G. Hardie

Practice chanter playing a traditional Jig

A bagpipe practice chanter is a double-reed woodwind instrument, principally used as an adjunct to the Great Highland bagpipe. As its name implies, the practice chanter serves as a practice instrument: firstly for learning to finger the different melody notes of bagpipe music, and (after a player masters the bagpipes) to practice new music.

== Design and construction ==
The practice chanter is essentially a long, thin piece of wood or plastic (in two parts) with a small-diameter hole bored lengthwise through the centre. Air is directed into and through this borehole and passes through a reed, the vibration of which causes the sound. On the lower portion of the chanter, holes are bored into the instrument at right angles to the central borehole. These holes are then covered or uncovered to produce the melody.

Practice chanters can be made out of various materials and come in various sizes: short chanters are designed for the smaller hands of a child; regular chanters (as shown in the photo at right) are the same size as the traditional chanters; long chanters are also available, with the added length allowing a melody hole spacing identical to that of the bagpipe chanter itself. On some long chanters, the melody holes are also countersunk so that the outside face of the melody holes will have the same diameter as the bagpipe chanter holes.

Pipe Chanters and practice chanters are typically made out of hardwood such as African Blackwood; before the expansion of the British Empire, native woods were used, and are still used in many folk instruments. In the 1960s African Blackwood was in very short supply, and Ireland's only bagpipe maker, Andrew Warnock of The Pipers Cave in Northern Ireland, began making chanters from polyoxymethylene (also known by several names), an extremely strong and durable machinable plastic which at the time was used for making police batons. The Gibson and Dunbar chanters are made out of polyoxymethylene. It is a material that can be machined and polished much like soft metals. Since there is no danger of splitting with a plastic chanter, there is no need for a sole (see below), although some models retain it for decorative purposes.

The practice chanter can be played either sitting or standing.

== Parts ==
Details of a blackwood practice chanter made by Duncan Soutar of St Andrews, Scotland.

The practice chanter consists of a top section with mouthpiece, a lower portion with finger holes, and a reed.

The top section consists of the mouthpiece (the uppermost portion) and the reed cover (the thicker portion). The player blows into the mouthpiece. It can be made of nylon, wood, or plastic. The reed cover channels the air over the reed causing it to vibrate and produce the sound. The ring at the base of the reed cover is a ferrule, and is purely decorative. It can be made out of ivory, imitation ivory, plastic, nylon, or a metal such as silver.

The reed can be made of cane or plastic. The two blades of the double reed vibrate against one another when air passes over them, and the sound is channeled down into and through the bottom section of the chanter.

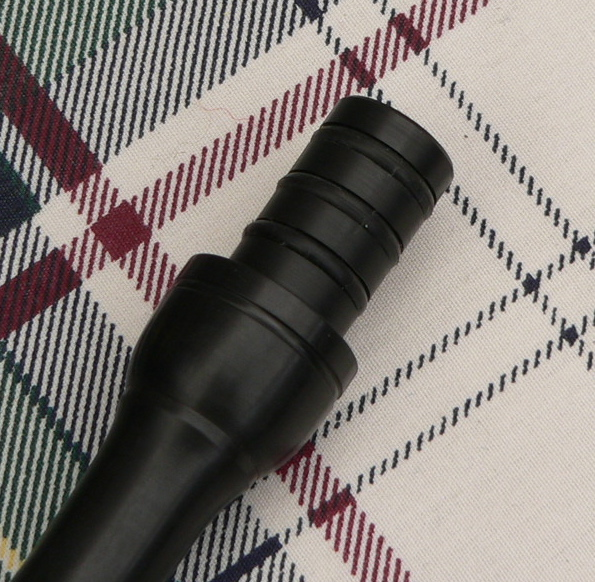
O-rings on the Dunbar practice chanter

The bottom section of the chanter is the portion that produces the melody which results from the covering and uncovering of small holes drilled into the core of the chanter at precisely determined intervals. The top of this section is the stock into which the reed is inserted. The stock is tightly fitted into the top section of the practice chanter, and is usually wrapped with hemp, plumber tape, etc. to ensure an airtight seal. The base of the bottom section may contain another ring called the sole. On a wooden chanter the sole keeps the wood from splitting. With the advent of plastic chanters, "sole-less" designers are more common.

== Reasons for use ==
The practice chanter is, as the name implies, used to practice playing the bagpipes in place of the full instrument. The practice chanter is significantly quieter and better suited for the indoors, and requires less blowing than the bagpipes, making it physically easier to play.

== Am Feadan Gàidhealach ==
In Gaelic-speaking areas of Scotland, musicians traditionally constructed their own practice chanters out of reed (Scottish Gaelic: cuilc) and barley (Scottish Gaelic: eòrna) stalks. The reed was hollowed out with a wire heated over a peat fire, and holes were burned in the reed in the same way, to form the body of the chanter. A short piece of barley stalk was then shaped in the mouth to function as a sounding reed. These home-made chanters were called feadanan Gàidhealach (Highland or Gaelic chanters; singular, feadan Gàidhealach) and were distinguished from manufactured practice chanters as feadanan Gallda (foreign chanters). The sound of the feadan Gàidhealach is quite sweet and it appears that these homemade chanters were not just used for practice, but considered a proper instrument in their own right and played in a traditional house cèilidhs in the Western Isles of Scotland.
