= Pibroch =

Music genre associated with the Scottish Highlands

Pibroch, piobaireachd or ceòl mòr is an art music genre associated primarily with the Scottish Highlands that is characterised by extended compositions with a melodic theme and elaborate formal variations. Strictly meaning 'piping' in Scottish Gaelic, piobaireachd has for some four centuries been music of the great Highland bagpipe.

A more general term is Scottish Gaelic: ceòl mòr (in reformed spelling, or ceòl mór in old spelling), meaning the 'great music' (to distinguish this complex extended art-music from the more popular Scottish music such as dances, reels, marches, and strathspeys, which are called ceòl beag or 'little music'). This term encompasses music of a similar nature to pibroch, pre-dating the adoption of the Highland pipes, that has historically been played on the wire-strung Gaelic harp (clàrsach) and later on the Scottish fiddle, and this form is undergoing a revival.

== Etymology ==
Pronunciations
Scots Gaelic	Pronunciation
Bàrluath	[ˈpaːrˠl̪ˠəɣ]
Binneas is Boraraig	[ˈpiɲəs̪ əs̪ ˈpɔɾəɾɛkʲ]
Canntaireachd	[ˈkʰaun̪ˠt̪ɛɾʲəxk]
Ceòl beag	[kʲʰɔl̪ˠˈpek]
Ceòl mór	[kʲʰɔl̪ˠˈmoːɾ]
Crùnluath	[ˈkʰɾuːn̪ˠl̪ˠəɣ]
Dithis	[ˈtʲi.ɪʃ]
Leumluath	[ˈʎeːml̪ˠəɣ]
Pìobaire	[ˈpʰiːpɛɾʲə]
Pìobaireachd	[ˈpʰiːpɛɾʲəxk]
Siubhal	[ˈʃu.əl̪ˠ]
Taorluath	[ˈt̪ɯːrˠl̪ˠəɣ]
Ùrlar	[ˈuːrˠl̪ˠəɾ]

The Gaelic word piobaireachd literally means 'piping' or 'act of piping'. The word is derived from pìob ('pipes') via pìobaire ('piper') plus the abstract forming suffix -eachd. In Gaelic, pìobaireachd literally refers to any pipe music, not merely ceòl mór (literally: 'big music'). Pibroch is a spelling variant first attested in Lowland Scots in 1719.

Bagpipe societies, such as the Glasgow-based Piobaireachd Society, have commonly employed the term piobaireachd as a synonym for ceol mor played on the Great Highland Bagpipes. The term piobaireachd or pibroch is also historically employed to describe ceol mor-related repertoire played on instruments other than bagpipes, particularly the Scottish fiddle.

== Notation ==
Pibroch is properly expressed by minute and often subtle variations in note duration and tempo. Traditionally, the music was taught using a system of unique chanted vocables referred to as Canntaireachd, an effective method of denoting the various movements in pibroch music, and assisting the learner in proper expression and memorization of the tune. The predominant sung vocable system used today is the Nether Lorn canntaireachd adapted from the written vocable notation in the Campbell Canntaireachd manuscripts (Volume 1. 1797) and (Volume 2. 1814). and used in the subsequent Piobaireachd Society books.

Multiple written manuscripts of pibroch in staff notation have been published, including Angus MacKay's book A Collection of Ancient Pìobaireachd (1845), Archibald Campbell's The Kilberry Book of Ceòl Mór (1969), and The Pìobaireachd Society Books

The staff notation in Angus MacKay's book and subsequent Pìobaireachd Society sanctioned publications is characterised by a simplification and standardisation of the ornamental and rhythmic complexities of many pibroch compositions when compared with earlier unpublished manuscript sources. A number of the earliest manuscripts such as the Campbell Canntaireachd MS that predate the standard edited published collections have been made available by the Pibroch Network website as a publicly accessible comparative resource.

Pibroch is difficult to document accurately using traditional musical notation, and early attempts suffered from conventions which do not accurately convey tune expression. More contemporary pibroch notation has attempted to address these issues, and has produced notation much closer to true expression of the tunes.

Pibroch does not follow a strict metre but it does have a rhythmic flow or pulse; it does not follow a strict beat or tempo although it does have pacing. The written notation of pibroch serves mainly as a rough guide for the piper. The expression of the rhythms and tempos of the pibroch tune are primarily acquired from an experienced teacher and applied through interpretive performance practice.

== Structure ==
Related ceòl mór genres were historically also played on the fiddle and on the wire-strung Gaelic harp or clàrsach. The clarsach ceòl mór is likely to have predated and influenced the later pipe and fiddle music. However, pibroch in its current form was developed on the Great Highland Bagpipe, with most of the extant pibroch tunes being adapted to or written specifically for the GHB, and as a result the musical form is influenced by features and limitations of that instrument.

In musical structure, pibroch is a theme with variations. The theme is usually a very simple melody, though few if any pibroch contain the theme in its simplest form. The theme is first stated in a slow movement called the ground or in Gaelic the ùrlar. This is usually a fairly stylised version of the theme, and usually includes numerous added embellishments and connecting notes.

The subsequent variations can number from one up to about twenty, although there are a few fragmentary tunes for which only a ground is known. In most cases the variations following the ground involve the use of a number of different musical embellishments, usually starting very simply and progressing through successively more complex movements before returning again to the ground.

Variations after the ùrlar or ground usually include a siubhal ('passing' or 'traversing') or dithis ('two' or 'a pair') or both. The siubhal comprises theme notes each coupled with a single note of higher or lower pitch that usually precedes the theme note. The theme note is held and its paired single note cut. The timing given to the theme notes is of critical importance in displaying the virtuosity of the master piper. If the theme and single note are repeated or played in pairs, it is referred to as a doubling, otherwise a siubhal singling.

The dithis is similar. The theme note is accented and followed by a cut note of lower pitch, usually alternating, for example, between an A and a G. If the coupled pairs are played in a repeating pattern, it too is called a dithis doubling.

Following the siubhal or dithis variation are other more complex embellishments. The Gaelic names of these type movements are: leumluath, taorluath, and crùnluath. In almost all pibroch in which these later movements are found, the variations are played first as a singling and then as a doubling and with a slightly increased tempo. However, not all pibrochs will include all or even any of these movements but instead use variations that are deemed to be irregular.

In addition the theme will usually have one of several internal structures for the ordering of its musical phrases. These are usually classified as follows:

- Primary – The theme or ground is composed of two two-bar phrases, A and B, played in the following order:
  - AAB
  - ABB
  - AB
- Secondary – The theme or ground is composed of four phrases, with A and B being one-bar phrases and C and D being two-bar phrases, and played in the following order:
  - ABCD
  - CBAD
  - CD
- Tertiary – A relative of Primary Pibroch, with three two-bar phrases, A, B, and C, played in the following order:
  - AB
  - ABB
  - AB
  - C
- Irregular – The theme or ground does not fit into any of the above structures.

Few pibrochs are pure examples of any of these structures though most can be fit into one of the first three with a slight modification of one or two of the phrases in one or more lines.

A compilation of the structure of many pibroch tunes, including related historical essays, was written by A. J. Haddow.

There is evidence from early treatises (e.g. Joseph MacDonald) that the structure was originally counted in 4, so a Primary form would be

- AABA
- BBAB

Similarly, Secondary form can be read as

- abABA
- baBAB

== Titles and subjects ==
The Gaelic titles of pibroch compositions have been categorised by Roderick Cannon into four broad groupings. These include:

- Functional – salutes, laments, marches and gatherings.
- Technical – referring to strictly musical characteristics of the pieces such as "port" or "glas", terms shared with wire-strung harpers.
- Textual – quotations from song lyrics, usually the opening words.
- Short names – diverse short names referring to places, people and events similar to those found in Scottish popular music of the period.

Pibroch in the functional category were most commonly written for or have come to be associated with specific events, personages or situations:

- Laments (Cumha) are mourning tunes often written for a deceased person of note. Laments were commonly written as a result of families being displaced from their homeland, a practice that was very common after the Jacobite rising of 1745.
- Salutes (Fàilte) are tunes that acknowledge a person, event or location. Salutes were often written upon the birth of children or after a visitation to a prominent figure such as a clan chief. Many salutes have been written to commemorate famous pipers.
- Gatherings (Port Tionail) are tunes written specifically for a clan. These tunes were used to call a clan together by their chief. The title "Gathering" traditionally refers to the practice of seasonal cattle raiding of rival clans.
- Rowing pibroch are more rhythmic tunes used to encourage rowers while crossing the sea.

The different categories of pibroch do not have consistent distinctive musical patterns that are characteristic of the category. The role of the pibroch may inform the performers interpretative expression of rhythm and tempo.

Many pibroch tunes have intriguing names such as "Too Long in This Condition", "The Piper's Warning to His Master", "Scarce of Fishing", "The Unjust Incarceration" and "The Big Spree" which suggest specific narrative events or possible song lyric sources.

The oral transmission of the repertoire has led to diverse and divergent accounts of the names for tunes, and many tunes have a number of names. Mis-translation of Gaelic names with non-standard phonetic spelling adds to the confusion.

In some cases the name and subject matter of pibroch tunes appears to have been reassigned by-19th century editors such as Angus MacKay, whose book A Collection of Ancient Piobaireachd or Highland Pipe Music (1838) included historically fanciful and romantic pibroch source stories by antiquarian James Logan. A number of pibroch collected by MacKay have very different titles in earlier manuscript sources. MacKay's translated English titles became the commonly accepted modern pibroch names, sanctioned by subsequent Piobaireachd Society editors.

Roderick Cannon has compiled a dictionary of the Gaelic names of pibroch from early manuscripts and printed sources, detailing inconsistencies, difficulties in translation, variant names, accurate translations and verifiable historically documented attributions and dates in the few cases where this is possible.

== History ==
In the absence of concrete documentary evidence, the origins of pibroch have taken on a quasi-mythic status. The earliest commonly recognised figures in the history of bagpipe pibroch are the MacCrimmon family of pipers, particularly Donald Mor MacCrimmon (c. 1570 – 1640), who is reputed to have left a group of highly developed tunes, and Patrick Mor MacCrimmon (c. 1595 – 1670), one of the hereditary pipers to the Chief of MacLeods of Dunvegan on the isle of Skye. The prominence of the MacCrimmon Pipers coincides closely with the legislation designed to curb the importance of the Clan Bardic Harpists (Clarsairs). These laws known as the Statutes of Iona of 1609 are significant in reducing the role of the Clarsach and elevating the Piobh in importance. This suggests a deliberate adoption of older Harp tunes onto the Great Highland Bagpipe.

There is some controversy over the attribution of authorship of key pibroch tunes to the MacCrimmons by Walter Scott, Angus Mackay and others who published on the topic in the 19th century. The Campbell Canntaireachd, written in 1797, is a two-volume manuscript with chanted vocable transcriptions of pibroch music that predates the 19th-century attributions. It contains no references to the MacCrimmons and has different names for numerous tunes that were subsequently associated with them.

The pibroch "Cha till mi tuill" in the Campbell Canntaireachd manuscript, which translates as "I shall return no more", is related to a tune associated with victims of the Clearances emigrating to the New World. Walter Scott wrote new romantic verses to this tune in 1818 with the title "Lament – (Cha till suin tuille)" which translates as "We shall return no more", later republished as "Mackrimmon's Lament. Air – Cha till mi tuille". In Angus MacKay's book A Collection of Ancient Piobaireachd or Highland Pipe Music, 1838, the pibroch "Cha till mi tuill" is subsequently published with the title "MacCrummen will never return".

The pibroch "Couloddins Lament" in the Campbell Canntaireachd manuscript appears in MacKay's book with the title "Lament for Patrick Og MacCrimmon". This pattern has led critics of the orthodox accounts of pibroch history such as Alistair Campsie to conclude that the authorship and origins of the pibroch repertoire were reframed for political and Hanoverian motivations that can be traced back to anxieties over Scottish nationalism.

While the conventional accounts of the origins of pibroch are largely characterised by an aggrandising romanticism common to antiquarian appropriations of remnant historical traditions in the late 18th century and early 19th century, there are substantial surviving authentic musical documents that concur with a living tradition of performed repertoire, providing a grounding for any debate over authoritative accounts of the tradition.

=== Harp precedents for pibroch ===
Most pibroch are commonly assumed to have been written during the 16th to 18th centuries. The entire repertoire comprises approximately 300 tunes. In many cases the composer is unknown, however pibroch continues to be composed up to the present day. Recent research suggests that the style of ornamentation in pibroch points to earlier origins in wire-strung Gaelic harp music, in particular the use of rapid descending arpeggios as gracenotes.

The wire-strung clàrsach was traditionally the primary high status aristocratic instrument in Gaelic Scotland and Ireland. The art music performed on the wire-strung harp was passed down through oral transmission and much of the repertoire is likely to have been lost. A diverse range of historical manuscripts nevertheless provide a resource for the reconstruction of key aspects of this musical culture. A significant body of wire-strung harp compositions and related performance practices were notated from the last of the Irish wire-strung harpists by Edward Bunting in the late 18th century. Documentation of the Scottish wire-strung harp repertoire can be found through tunes that were transcribed to other instruments such as the Port genre transcribed in Scottish lute manuscripts and other collections, fiddle pibrochs published by Walter McFarlan, and Daniel Dow, and possibly some of the early bagpipe pibrochs. Probable wire-strung harp repertoire can also be found in a number of collections of Irish and Scottish songs and tunes, often published in arrangements for violin, flute and other modern instruments.

"Caoineadh Rìoghail/The Royal Lament" (c. 1649) is a harp tune similar in structure to pibroch with an introductory theme and formal variations. It is reputed to have been composed by the aristocratic wire-strung harper John Garbh MacLean, Laird of Coll, on the execution of Charles the First. The tune was documented and transcribed for the piano by Simon Fraser from repertoire that had survived in his family.

A pibroch that is considered to be one of the oldest in the repertoire appears in the Campbell Canntaireachd with the title "Chumbh Craoibh Na Teidbh" which translates as "Lament for the Tree of Strings", a possible poetic reference to the wire-strung harp.

Another better known pibroch published by Angus MacKay with the Gaelic title "Cumhadh Craobh nan teud" is translated as "Lament for the Harp Tree." In MacKay's book James Logan notes: "This piobaireachd, so unlike all others, is evidently from its style, of very high antiquity. We have not been able to procure any satisfactory account of Cumhadh Craobh nan teud, which is usually translated, "Lament for the Harp Tree", i.e. the tree of strings. It strikes us that this is a bardic expression for the instrument itself, as we should say "the Bag of Pipes." This pibroch appears in the Campbell Canntaireachd manuscript as "MacLeod's Lament."

A related tune was published by Angus Fraser in 1816 with the title "Cumha Craobh nan teud/Lament for the Harp Tree". William Matheson argues that the title is a corruption of "Cumha crann nan teud" or "Lament for the Harp Key". He identifies the pibroch composition with the song "Feill nan Crann" attributed to one of the last Scottish wire-strung harper poets Rory Dall Morison (c. 1656 – c. 1714), also known as Ruaidhri Dall Mac Mhuirich, written in his later years as a satirical lament to his declining sexual potency.

As Scottish Gaelic aristocratic patronage and traditions began to break down through political and cultural changes and the ever-increasing influences of European and English cultural values and mores, the role of the wire-strung clarsach harp went into a decline. The patronage of high prestige professional hereditary harpers was largely gone by the mid-17th century, although there are records of harpers such as Rory Dall Morison who were still being maintained by leading families up until the early 18th century.

=== Fiddle pibroch ===
Ceòl mór repertoire is likely to have transferred from the harp to the newly developed Italian violin in the late 16th century as fiddlers began to receive aristocratic patronage and supplement the role of the harpers. Evidence of concurrent patronage can be found in a notary report sent to the Laird of Grant in 1638 detailing that his fiddler John Hay and his harper had injured each other in a fight. The heightened social and cultural status for fiddlers was consolidated by Clan Cummings of Freuchie who became the hereditary fiddlers and subsequently also pipers to the Laird of Grant from the early 17th century until the late 18th century.

A distinctive body of ceòl mór known as fiddle pibroch developed in this period with melodic themes and formal variations that are similar to, but not necessarily derived from or imitative of concurrent bagpipe pibroch, as the name "fiddle pibroch" might suggest. The two forms are likely to have developed in parallel from a common shared source in earlier harp music and Gaelic song.

Fiddle pibroch performance techniques included double-stops, different bowing patterns, complex ornamentation and expressive rubato rhythmic freedom. Pibroch fiddlers employed alternative scordatura tunings to play this repertoire, such as the "A E a e" tuning recommended by violinist/composer James Oswald. Around seventeen fiddle pibroch compositions survive in various 18th- and 19th-century manuscripts and publications, collected by Walter McFarlan, Daniel Dow, James Oswald and others. Notable fiddle pibrochs include compositions likely to have been transcribed from the wire-strung harp repertoire such as "Cumha Iarla Wigton/Lament for the Earl of Wigton," and "Cumh Easpuic Earra-ghaoidheal/Lament for the Bishop of Argyll," and compositions for the violin within the pibroch form such as "Marsail Lochinalie" and "Mackintosh's Lament." This musical lineage had gone into decline around the time the fiddle pibroch repertoire was documented in the late 18th-century manuscripts, culminating in the laments by and for the Scottish fiddler and composer Niel Gow (1727–1807).

=== Emergence of bagpipe pibroch ===
Aristocratic Scottish Gaelic ceòl mór harp repertoire and practices are assumed to have begun to transfer across from the harp to the bagpipes in the 16th century. A North Uist tradition identifies the first MacCrimmon as a harper. The MacCrimmons asserted that they received their first training in a school in Ireland. Alexander Nicholson (b. 1844) in his book History of Skye originally published in 1930, recounts a tradition that the MacCrimmons were "skilful players of the harp, and may have been composers of its music, before they began to cultivate the other and more romantic instrument."

There were a number of musicians across the period from the 17th to the 18th centuries who were noted multi-instrumentalists and potentially formed a bridge from the harp to the fiddle and bagpipe repertoire. Ronald MacDonald of Morar (1662–1741), known in Gaelic as Raghnall MacAilein Òig, was an aristocratic wire-strung clarsach harpist, fiddler, piper and composer, celebrated in the pibroch "The Lament for Ronald MacDonald of Morar." He is the reputed composer of a number of highly regarded pibrochs including "An Tarbh BreacDearg/The Red Speckled Bull", "A Bhoalaich/An Intended Lament," also published in Angus MacKay's book as "A Bhoilich/The Vaunting", and "Glas Mheur" which MacKay translates as "The Finger Lock." This pibroch is entitled "Glass Mhoier" in the Campbell Canntaireachd.

There are two other pibrochs in the Campbell Canntaireachd manuscript with the related titles "A Glase", and "A Glass". "Glas" is also a key term found in the Irish wire-harp tradition, as noted down by Edward Bunting from harpers such as Denis O'Hampsey who was one of the last musicians still playing the traditional Gaelic repertoire in the late 18th century. Bunting uses glass as a variant of gléis in relation to tuning. He also lists the term glas as a specific fingering technique, which he translates as "a joining", a simile for lock. He describes this as "double notes, chords etc" for the left treble hand and right bass hand.

William McMurchy (c. 1700 – c. 1778) from Kintyre, was a noted poet, wire-strung harper and piper, reportedly attached to MacDonald of Largie in 1745. In correspondence regarding McMurchy's collection of Gaelic poetry that was passed to the Highland Society, Duncan Stewart of Glenbuckie, Argyle's Chamberlain in Kintyre, commented that "The eldest of them (the McMurchy brothers) William who was a great genius put all the pibroch and many highland airs to music." McMurchy may well then have been one of the key transcribers of pibroch.

=== Cultural ascendancy of bagpipe pibroch ===
The rise of the bagpipe and the corresponding shift away from the harp and its associated traditions of bardic poetry is documented with a confronting disdain in the satirical dispraising song "Seanchas Sloinnidh na Piob o thùs/A History of the Pipes from the Beginning" (c. 1600) by Niall Mòr MacMhuirich (c. 1550 – 1630), poet to the MacDonalds of Clanranald:

"John MacArthur's screeching bagpipes, is like a diseased heron, full of spittle, long limbed and noisy, with an infected chest like that of a grey curlew. Of the world's music Donald's pipe, is a broken down outfit, offensive to a multitude, sending forth its slaver through its rotten bag, it was a most disgusting filthy deluge..."

This can be contrasted with the celebration of the heroic warrior associations of bagpipe pibroch at the expense of the harp and fiddle by later Clanranald poet Alasdair mac Mhaighstir Alasdair (c. 1695 – 1770) in the song "Moladh air Piob-Mhor Mhic Cruimein/In Praise of MacCrimmons Pipes":

"Thy chanter's shout gives pleasure, Sighing thy bold variations. Through every lively measure; The war note intent on rending, White fingers deft are pounding, To hack both marrow and muscles, With thy shrill cry resounding... You shamed the harp, Like untuned fiddle's tone, Dull strains for maids, And men grown old and done: Better thy shrill blast, From gamut brave and gay, Rousing up men to the destructive fray..."

Bardic verses traditionally celebrated the clàrsach harp and made no mention of bagpipes. Hugh Cheape argues that the bagpipes gained popularity and prominence through the need for a martial instrument in a period of increasing military engagements. Bagpipes were grafted on to existing structures of aristocratic cultural patronage and aesthetic appreciation in the mid-17th century and became the primary ceòl mór instrument, appropriating and supplanting the high cultural and musical role of the harp.

This is reflected in the patronage offered to a succession of hereditary poets, harpers and subsequently pipers who were retained by leading Clan families, including pibroch dynasties such as the MacCrimmons, pipers to the MacLeods of Dunvegan, and the MacArthurs, pipers to the MacDonalds of Sleat. Cheape identifies accounts of a MacArthur college of piping instruction in ceòl mór as a continuation of a pre-existing Irish bardic model.

=== Modern bagpipe pibroch (early 19th century – present) ===
==== Bagpipe pibroch survival and revival ====
In the aftermath of the Battle of Culloden in 1746, the old Gaelic cultural order underwent a near total collapse. Pibroch continued to be played by bagpipers, but with diminished patronage and status, and was perceived to have gone into a decline. The modern revival of pibroch was initiated by the newly founded Highland Society of London. They funded annual competitions, with the first being held at the Falkirk Masonic Lodge in 1781. Over the course of the 19th century, with the opening up of communications within the Highlands, in particular, the railways, a competing circuit emerged with the two most pre-eminent competitions being held at Inverness and Oban, the former descended directly from the first Falkirk competition.

The orally transmitted pibroch repertoire was collected and documented in a diverse range of manuscripts mostly dating from the early 19th century. The first comprehensive collections were the canntaireachd notations in the Campbell Canntaireachd MS (1797 & 1814) and the Neil MacLeod Gesto Canntaireachd MS (1828) collected from John MacCrimmon prior to his death in 1822. A series of manuscripts in the early 19th century documented pibroch in staff notation, including the Hannay – MacAuslan MS (c. 1815), a primary source for the Donald MacDonald MS (1820) the John MacGregor/Angus MacArthur MS (1820), the Donald MacDonald Jnr. MS (1826), and the John MacKay MS (1840).

Angus MacKay's book A Collection of Ancient Piobaireachd or Highland Pipe Music, published in 1838, documented and presented the pibroch repertoire in staff notation with supplementary commentary by antiquarian James Logan. MacKay simplified many of the pibroch compositions, editing out complex ornamentation and asymmetries that were evident in documentation of the same compositions published in earlier manuscripts such as the Campbell Canntaireachd MS. He also specified regular time signatures that standardised and regulated a music that was traditionally performed with expressive rubato rhythmic interpretation of the musical phrasing and dynamics. MacKay's staff notated edited version of pibroch became the authoritative reference for the 19th- and 20th-century revival of pibroch, and greatly influenced subsequent modern pibroch performance.

In 1903, The Pìobaireachd Society was founded with the aim of recording the corpus of existing pibroch tunes, collating the various versions, and publishing an authoritative edition. Those normative tune settings have been the basis on which ceòl mór competitors at the various Highland Games have been judged ever since, with the piping judges themselves being appointed by the Society.

Pipers and researchers such as Allan MacDonald, Barnaby Brown and William Donaldson have questioned the editing of the tunes that went in the Pìobaireach Society books. Many compositions appear to have been edited and distorted to make them conform unnecessarily to particular recognised tune structures. The standardisation of the notated pibroch tunes has made the judging of competitions easier at the expense of the ornate complexity and musicality of an art-music that had passed down from teacher to pupil through the oral transmission of repertoire and technique.

Independent documentation of this tradition of oral transmission can be found in canntaireachd manuscripts, chanted vocable transcriptions of the music that predate the normative musical scores authorised by the Pìobaireachd Society and enforced through prescriptive competition judging criteria. The Pibroch Network website has made a range of these Canntaireachd manuscripts available online as a comparative resource.

There was reportedly a third lost volume of the Campbell canntaireachd manuscripts dating from the late 18th century. The first two volumes were also lost in 1816 but rediscovered in 1907 in the possession of Anne Campbell, a descendant of Colin Campbell. Roderick Cannon and Peter McCalister have recently initiated a public campaign to track down any living relatives of Campbell or other parties who might have acquired the document without realising its historical and musical significance.

==== Performance lineages ====
The oral transmission of pibroch also survives as a living tradition through diverse lineages of teachers and pupils, traceable back to the earliest accounts of the form. Distinctive approaches to performance technique and interpretation developed through different lineages of pibroch playing and instruction, with two of the most influential coming to be known as the Cameron style, which is more rounded, and the MacPherson style, which is more clipped.

Recordings by acclaimed practitioners such as Robert Reid, a leading proponent of the Cameron style, and Donald MacPherson offer exemplary documentation of these performance traditions.

Alternative lineages have also survived in unlikely settings. Simon Fraser (1845–1934), whose family emigrated to Melbourne, Australia in the 19th century, passed down a distinct body of pibroch repertoire via canntaireachd, staff notation and through the training of students. These ornate and highly musical pibrochs predate the standardisation of the music by the Pìobaireachd Society. Melbourne-based piper Dr Barrie Orme, who was trained in a lineage traceable back to Simon Fraser, has documented this parallel body of around 140 pibroch through tutor publications, a six volume series of archival recordings of the Simon Fraser pibroch repertoire, and a DVD video demonstrating the performance techniques passed down to Orme by his teacher Hugh Fraser, Simon Fraser's son.

J.D. Ross Watt was a Scottish-born, South African-based piper who also published a further small number of distinctive pibroch sourced from Simon Fraser. Watt's own bagpipe compositions are influenced by Simon Fraser's pibroch style.

=== Contemporary ceòl mór revival ===
==== Performance-based pibroch research ====
An emerging model of historically informed practice-based research into pibroch is being conducted by innovative piper/scholars such as Barnaby Brown and Allan MacDonald. Brown has researched pibroch documented in historical manuscripts, focusing particularly on the Campbell Canntaireachd MS. He has revived and recorded lesser known pibroch such as "Hioemtra Haentra" and "Hihorodo Hiharara" from the Campbell Canntaireachd MS that have not been publicly performed for hundreds of years and plays them on replica early bagpipes from the period. He has made his analysis of pibroch canntaireachd, ornamentation and performance techniques available as an online resource with recorded audio demonstrations. Brown is composing and recording new works of pibroch and related musical traditions informed by this research. Barnaby Brown has collaborated with harper Bill Taylor and violinist Clare Salaman on the recording of bagpipe pibroch arranged for the Clarsach wire harp, lyre, hardanger fiddle, hurdy-gurdy, vielle, bone flute, bagpipes and canntaireachd vocals, released in 2016.

Allan MacDonald is a competition winning piper who has been investigating the relationship between Gaelic song and the melodic theme or urlar ground of pibroch as a means to inform the rubato rhythmic and musical interpretation of the performance of this pipe repertoire. He has researched and recorded pibroch and chanted canntaireachd on the recent album Dastirum that restores and interprets repertoire that was "tidied up" and edited out by Angus MacKay and subsequent PS editors. His performances on this recording draw on early manuscript sources such as the Colin Campbell Canntaireachd (1797 & 1814) that pre-date MacKay's standardised versions.

Allan MacDonald is a noted composer of new pibroch works such as Na-h-Eilthirich, a wrenching lament for those who suffered ethnic cleansing in the 18th and 19th centuries, commissioned for the BBC series of the same title. He has also extemporised pibroch variations to the early Scottish song "Dol Dhan Taigh Bhuan Leat (Going to the Eternal Dwelling with You)" reviving a lost compositional practice described in early accounts. His recordings include collaborations with musicians outside the piping fraternity who are researching and playing ceòl mór and related musical traditions on other instruments, notably acclaimed pibroch fiddler Bonnie Rideout, Gaelic singer Margaret Stewart and wire-strung Gaelic harp player Javier Sainz.

A variety of new pibroch recital performance events have been initiated recently as an alternative format to the more conservative and insular competition circuit. Breton piper Patrick Molard organised the first pibroch recitals in Brest and Paris in 1992. The newly founded Glasgow Piping Centre hosted a series of pibroch concert recitals in 1996–1998 documented in a series of live recordings.

Allan MacDonald and Iain MacInnes curated the first dedicated pibroch recitals at the Edinburgh Arts Festival in 1999 as a series of nine concerts including performances by Allan MacDonald, William McCallum, Roderick MacLeod, Robert Wallace and Barnaby Brown, who premiered the public performance of two Campbell Canntaireachd pibrochs. A live CD "Ceol na Pioba (Music of the Pipes) – A Concert of Piobaireachd" documented these performances. At the Edinburgh Festival in 2004 MacDonald arranged the "From Battle Lines to Bar Lines" series of battle pibroch performances on cello (Neil Johnstone), viola, flute, fiddle, wire-strung clarsach (Karen Marshalsay), piano (James Ross), small pipes and big pipes with associated Gaelic songs.

Matthew Welch and Robinson McClellan are emerging composers who offered a recital at Yale in 2007 of 17th-century pibroch performed on bagpipes by Welch and new works informed by pibroch for string quartet and organ, composed by Welch and McClellan respectively.

Carnegie Mellon University, in Pittsburgh, Pennsylvania (USA) created the first degree in bagpiping, a BFA in Music Performance (Bagpipe). The Royal Scottish Academy of Music and Drama started a similar music degree program in partnership with the National Piping Centre. They host a series of concerts that featured Barnaby Brown in 2010 performing the pibroch "Desperate Battle" arranged for the triple pipe or cuisle.

The Pibroch Network website has recently been founded to support the revival of historically informed pibroch performance through the sharing of scholarship and practice based research. The site makes freely available a comprehensive resource of largely unpublished early manuscripts of pibroch notation and canntaireachd from the late 18th and early 19th century.

==== Harp ceòl mór revival ====
A parallel body of practice-based research is being undertaken by wire-strung Gaelic harp players who are transcribing the ceòl mór repertoire back to its reputed harp origins via pibroch compositions from early manuscripts sources, particularly the Campbell Canntaireachd manuscript and from fiddle pibroch compositions documented by Daniel Dow and others.

Manx harper Charles Guard was the first to record arrangements of bagpipe pibrochs performed on the wire strung clarsach harp in 1977. Scottish Harper Alison Kinnaird recorded revived pibroch related ceòl mór repertoire on the harp along with other early Scottish harp music genres such as ports the following year. In her early recordings she played this music on a modern lever harp, She has recorded ceòl mór related compositions with Ann Heymann who plays a replica early Irish clairseach wire-strung harp. Kinnaird has recently also performed and recorded revived ceòl mór on a replica early Scottish wire-strung clarsach harp.

Veteran Breton harper Alan Stivell began performing and recording on the revived wire harp with bronze strings in the early 1960s. His recordings have included arrangements of three Bagpipe Pibroch ùrlar performed on wire harp, released in 1985.

There is a growing community of harpers performing early Scottish and Irish music on replica early clàrsach harps, strung with brass, bronze and silver wire, and increasingly with precious gold bass strings, based on historical and applied research by Ann and Charlie Heymann and Simon Chadwick.

Heymann has led the revival of sharpened fingernail-based techniques of playing the wire-strung harp documented by Edward Bunting in the late 18th century from the playing of Denis O'Hampsey, one of the last traditional Irish wire-strung harp players. The sustained resonance of the wire-strung clàrsach harp allows for intricate ornamental effects through various striking and dampening techniques.

Heymann has recorded pibroch transcribed from early manuscripts such as the Campbell Canntaireachd MS, in arrangements that employ a mobility of drone effects on the resonant wire strings, reverse engineering the shift to fixed drones that would have occurred in an appropriation of harp music by the bagpipes.

Violaine Mayor is a Breton wire-strung harper who has mastered canntaireachd chanting. She has recorded transcribed pibroch together with revived Breton harp repertoire such as medieval bardic lays.

Karen Marshalsay is a Scottish harper who performed with Allan MacDonald in his 2004 Edinburgh International Festival series of pibroch concerts From Battle Lines to Bar Lines, performing The Battle of The Bridge of Perth and other pibrochs on wire-strung clarsach. She also performed pibroch on wire-strung clarsach and music from the Robert ap Huw ms on bray harp at the National Piping Centre's 2013 Ceòl na Pìoba concert. She later recorded The Battle of the Bridge of Perth in a 2019 released solo CD.

Simon Chadwick is a harper and scholar who founded the Early Gaelic Harp Info website, which is a comprehensive online resource on the revival of wire-strung clarsach harp repertoire and playing techniques. He has recorded transcribed pibroch, fiddle pibroch and medieval Irish harp ceòl mór, played on a replica early Scottish Queen Mary wire-strung clarsach with brass, silver and gold strings. He has recorded a dedicated album of pibroch attributed to the composer Raghnall Mac Ailein Òig (1662–1741) performed on the wire harp, released in 2013. He has also made a body of live performances of pibroch and early Irish cèol mór on the wire harp available online on video via YouTube. Simon Chadwick gave a presentation on Harp Ceol Mor at the Piobaireachd Society Conference in 2016 which included performances of Burns March, Caniad San Silin and his arrangement for Clarsach wire harp of the bagpipe pibroch A Bhòilich/The Vaunting composed by Raghnall Mac Ailein Òig.

Chris Caswell is a multi-instrumentalist wire-strung harp player and maker, flautist and piper who studied harp with Alison Kinnaird and bagpipes with Donald MacPherson and Donald Shaw Ramsay. He began playing pibroch on the harp in 1973 and has transcribed and recorded the pibroch Catriona's (Catherine's) Lament played on a bronze-strung harp.

Brendan Ring is a multi-instrumentalist all Ireland champion piper, pipemaker, low-whistle player and wire harper. He has recorded pibroch transcribed to the wire harp alongside revived Irish harp repertoire and original compositions, performed on a replica of the Trinity College clairseach harp with brass, silver and gold strings, released in 2014. He has made live performances of pibroch and early Irish music on the wire harp available online on video via YouTube. Other emerging wire-strung harpers and scholars are also disseminating transcriptions of pibroch performed on the harp via YouTube.

Bill Taylor is a Scottish and Welsh early harp scholar and performer who has collaborated with pibroch piper Barnaby Brown and violinist Clare Salaman on the recording of bagpipe pibroch arranged for the Clarsach wire harp, lyre, hardanger fiddle, hurdy-gurdy, vielle, bone flute, bagpipes and canntaireachd vocals, released in 2016. Taylor and Brown have made available documentation of their collaborative research on the arrangements of bagpipe pibroch for wire strung Clarsach via the alt-pibroch website.

==== Fiddle pibroch revival ====
Virtuoso violinist and Scottish fiddler Edna Arthur was one of the first musicians to revive fiddle pibroch in performances and recordings with cellist David Johnson in the McGibbon Ensemble. Violinists such as Rachel Barton Pine and Bonnie Rideout are continuing this revival of the performance of fiddle pibroch repertoire on the violin, viola and cello with outcomes that are notable for their expressive musicality. Pine is a classically trained violinist who has recorded music by late 19th-century composers such as Max Bruch and Alexander "Pibroch" MacKenzie that incorporated Scottish fiddle repertoire into extended classical works. Granville Bantock is another classical composer who drew on pibroch, reworking "MacIntosh's Lament" for the composition "Pibroch, a Highland Lament for cello and harp" (1917). Pine's live repertoire includes revived fiddle pibroch compositions such as "MacIntosh's Lament" and "Pibroch."

Bonnie Rideout is a fiddler who has researched and revived fiddle pibroch repertoire and performance techniques. A number of her recordings feature extended fiddle pibrochs such as "MacIntosh's Lament" and "Marsail Lochinalie." Rideout and early Gaelic and Welsh harper and scholar Bill Taylor have recorded an arrangement of the early Scottish air "Minstrel of MacDonald" with newly composed pibroch variations. Rideout was commissioned to compose and record a new extended work in the fiddle pibroch form entitled "Kindred Spirits." Scottish violinist Ian Hardie was also commissioned to compose and record the new extended fiddle pibroch "The Highlands of Nairnshire."

Rideout has begun the release of a series of dedicated recordings of fiddle pibroch produced by her mentor John Purser. Scotland's Fiddle Piobaireachd Volume 1 features collaborations with pibroch bagpiper and scholar Allan MacDonald, Alan Jackson on gut-string harp and Chris Norman on baroque flute.

Rideout performs the early harp and fiddle pibroch "The Battle of Harlaw" and the related bagpipe pibroch "The Battle of the Birds" on the John Purser produced album Harlaw 1411–2011. Rideout first performed "The Battle of Harlaw" on the BBC radio series Scotland's Music hosted by John Purser, along with the harp and fiddle pibroch "Cumh Ioarla Wigton (Lament for the Earl of Wigtown)" The Harlaw CD features key ceòl mór revivalists including pibroch bagpipers Allan MacDonald and Barnaby Brown, early Scottish luter Ron MacFarlane, flautist Chris Norman and early Gaelic and Welsh harper Bill Taylor.

Bonnie Rideout's CD Scotland's Fiddle Piobaireachd Volume 2, produced by John Purser was released in 2012. It features Rideout on fiddle and viola, Allan MacDonald on Highland bagpipes, small pipes, and voice, Barnaby Brown on revived triple pipes, William Jackson on clarsach harp and Matthew Bell on bodhran. It includes arrangements of traditional fiddle pibrochs and two new compositions in the fiddle pibroch form by Rideout.

Scottish Fiddler and composer Paul Anderson incorporates revived fiddle pibrochs and transcribed bagpipe pibrochs in his live repertoire, documented on YouTube, and has composed the new work "Lament for the Gordons of Knock" in the fiddle pibroch form.

Multi-instrumental violinist Clare Salaman has collaborated with harper Bill Taylor and pibroch piper Barnaby Brown on the recording of bagpipe pibroch arranged for the hardanger fiddle, hurdy-gurdy and vielle, released in 2016.

== Related musical forms ==
=== Welsh Medieval cerdd dant ===
Ceòl mór is being situated within a broader medieval cultural milieu in the British Isles through the revival of early Welsh cerdd dant ("string music"). This genre of Irish influenced medieval Welsh music offers a precedent for Scottish pibroch as an aristocratic extended art music played on the harp with a repeated melodic theme or ground and elaborate formal variations. Welsh Cerdd Dant repertoire from the late-Middle Ages was documented in the ap Huw manuscripts in the 17th century by Robert ap Huw as a binary system of tabulature notation.

Bill Taylor is an early Scottish and Welsh harper who is researching, reconstructing and recording definitive performances of early cerdd dant music on replica historical gut-strung Romanesque harps and late-medieval bray harps. Taylor has published extensive online resources outlining this applied performance-based research. Taylor and Irish wire-strung harpist Paul Dooley discuss and perform demonstrations of the ap Huw music in the recent BBC documentary History of the Harp.

There is debate over the interpretation of references in Welsh manuscripts to the role of gut-strung and horse hair-strung bray harps in the late-Middle Ages. Taylor considers these to be the authentic instruments for the performance of cerdd dant. Heymann and Chadwick are contributing to a research project to reconstruct an early Welsh horse hair-strung bray harp, testing this theory through application.

Peter Greenhill's reading of the manuscripts has led him to conclude that the pieces were played on a wire strung harp and that they were instrumental pieces, though he theorises that the Clymau Cytgerdd section may have been used for poetical accompaniment. He argues that instrumental early cerdd dant music was originally played on the highly resonant wire-strung harp using similar sharpened nail-based string striking and dampening techniques and ornamentation employed in Irish and Scottish ceòl mór harp music.

Paul Dooley has researched and recorded a dedicated album of ap Huw compositions played on a replica early Irish wire-strung clairseach harp. Ann Heymann has researched the ap Huw manuscript with a particular focus on the interpretation of the notation of playing techniques that are comparable to the Irish wire-strung harp techniques noted down by Edward Bunting in the late 18th century. She has recorded "Kaniad San Silin", one of the oldest compositions in the cerdd dant repertoire on a replica early Irish wire-strung clairseach harp. Simon Chadwick also includes this piece in his live repertoire, played on a replica early Scottish Queen Mary wire-strung clarsach harp.

Barnaby Brown has identified characteristics of the Welsh and by extension Irish medieval harp tunings recorded in the ap Huw manuscript that are also present in Scottish bagpipe tuning. The common source of influence for these shared musical practices is likely to be found in the formal conventions of medieval aristocratic and religious Irish Gaelic wire-strung harp music.

=== Irish ceòl mór ===
Further clues to the broader cultural context of bagpipe pibroch can be found in the small body of compositions that have an Irish association. The pibroch "Cumha a Chleirich" which translates as "The Cleric's Lament" and is commonly known as "The Bard's Lament" is entitled "one of the Irish piobarich" in the Campbell Canntaireachd manuscript. This canntaireachd provides possible surviving documentation of an Irish harp ceòl mór repertoire. Ann Heymann has recently transcribed, performed and recorded this pibroch played on a replica early Irish wire-strung clairseach harp.

At the Highland Society of London pibroch competition in Edinburgh in 1785, John MacPherson is listed as having played "Piobrachd Ereanach an Irish Pibrach." A pibroch in the Angus MacKay MS Vol 1 entitled "Spiocaireachd Iasgaich/Scarce of Fishing" appears in the earlier Donald MacDonald Jnr. MS. (1826) with the very Irish title of "O'Kelly's Lament."

The Irish wire-strung harp standard "Brian Boru's March" appears with pibroch variations and a range of titles in the Scottish bagpipe repertoire: Angus MacKay and General C.S. Thomason both give two titles "Taom-boileinn na Coinneamh/The Frenzy of Meeting" and "Lament for Brian O'Duff", which concurs with the Campbell Canntaireachd title "Brian O'Duff's Lament"; Simon Fraser lists the tune as "A Lament for King Brian of Old"; and the Niel MacLeod of Gesto book of Canntaireachd gives the title "Tumilin O'Counichan an Irish Tune".

At the William Kennedy International Piping Festival (2009), held in Armagh, Barnaby Brown conducted workshops on the chanting of Irish associated pibroch canntaireachd from the Campbell Canntaireachd manuscript. These Irish ceòl mór workshops focused particularly on the canntaireachd transcriptions of "One of the Irish Piobarich" also known as "The Bard's Lament", the "Brian Boru's March" pibroch variant "Brian O'Duff's Lament/An Irish Lively Tune" also known as "Taom-boileinn na Coinneamh/The Frenzy of the Meeting", and "Ceann na Drochaide Bige/The End of the Little Bridge," a battle pibroch associated with an expedition to Ireland in 1594 by an army of Scottish Isleman to support Red Hugh O'Donnell's rebellion against Queen Elizabeth I. The pibrochs "Hugh's Lament," "Samuel's Black Dog" or "Lament for Samuel", and "Lament for the Earl of Antrim" also have an association with this Irish conflict. Frank Timoney argues that "Lament for the Earl of Antrim" is another possible Irish wire-strung harp composition.

The bagpipe pibroch "Duncan MacRae of Kintail's Lament" is a variant of the Irish harp tune "Ruairidhe Va Mordha/Rory O Moor, King of Leix's March" notated by Edward Bunting from the repertoire of Irish wire-strung harpists in the late 18th century. Allan MacDonald has played and recorded these two closely related compositions as a bagpipe medley, with the harp tune informing his revisions of the standard pibroch settings. He has also performed an arrangement of this medley with an ensemble of Irish musicians on modern instruments for the BBC documentary The Highland Sessions.

The only composition in the Irish wire-strung harp repertoire similar in structure to ceòl mór that is documented with intact formal variations is "Burns March", notated by Bunting and revived on the wire-strung harp in recordings by Charles Guard, Gráinne Yeats and more recently by Simon Chadwick. This medieval composition survived in the repertoire as a training tune for wire-strung harp students that provided a vehicle for the mastery of characteristic ornamental performance techniques.

== See also ==
- Canntaireachd
- Ceòl beag
- Ceòl meadhonach
- Donald MacLeod
