= Brian Boru bagpipes =

The Brian Boru bagpipe was invented and patented in 1908 by Henry Starck, an instrument maker (who also made standard Great Highland Bagpipes), in London, in consultation with William O'Duane. The name was chosen in honour of the Irish king Brian Boru (941–1014), though this bagpipe is not a recreation of any pipes that were played at the time of his reign.

The Brian Boru pipe is related to the Great Highland Bagpipe, but with a chanter that adds four to thirteen keys, to extend both the upper and lower ends of the scale, and optionally adds chromatic notes. His original pipes changed the drone configuration to a single tenor drone pitched one octave below the chanter, a baritone drone pitched one fifth below the tenor drone, and a bass drone pitched two octaves below the chanter, following the drone set-up of the Northumbrian Smallpipes. Some later designs of these pipes reverted to the Great Highland Bagpipe configuration of two tenor drones and one bass drone.

The Brian Boru bagpipe was played for a number of years by the pipe band in the Royal Inniskilling Fusiliers. They are still played by a number of civilian pipe bands including Ballygowan Pipe Band (based in Co. Down, Northern Ireland), Crimson Arrow Pipe Band (based in Newcastle Co. Down, NI) Ballymartin pipe band (based in Ballymartin village Co. Down) among others in Northern Ireland. It is still played in Ireland but has lost most of its former popularity. Bagpipe makers in both the United Kingdom and Pakistan still make the chanters.

== See also ==
- Bagpipes
