= Great Highland bagpipe =

Type of bagpipe native to Scotland

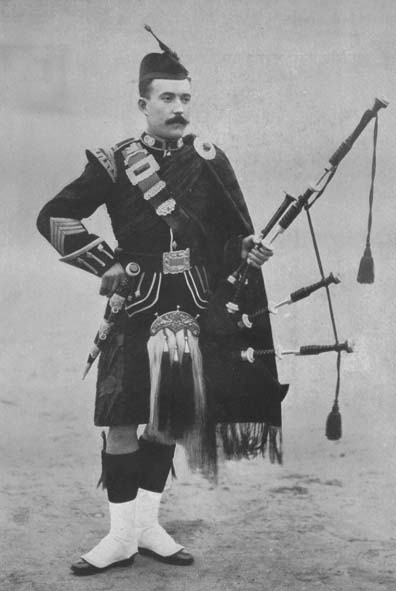
Pipe Major Willie Ross of the Argyll and Sutherland Highlanders (date unknown)

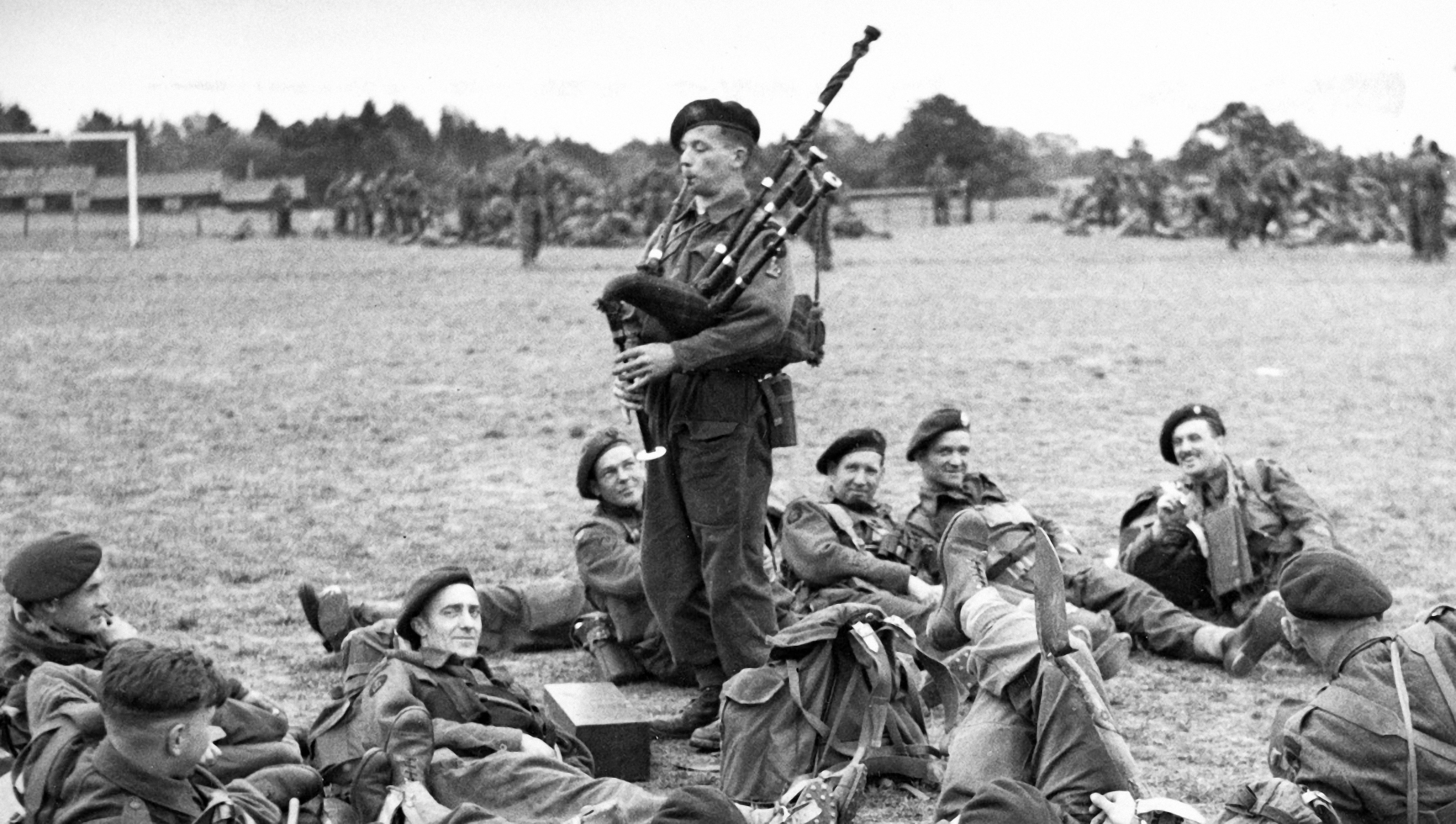
Piper Bill Millin playing the bagpipes 1944

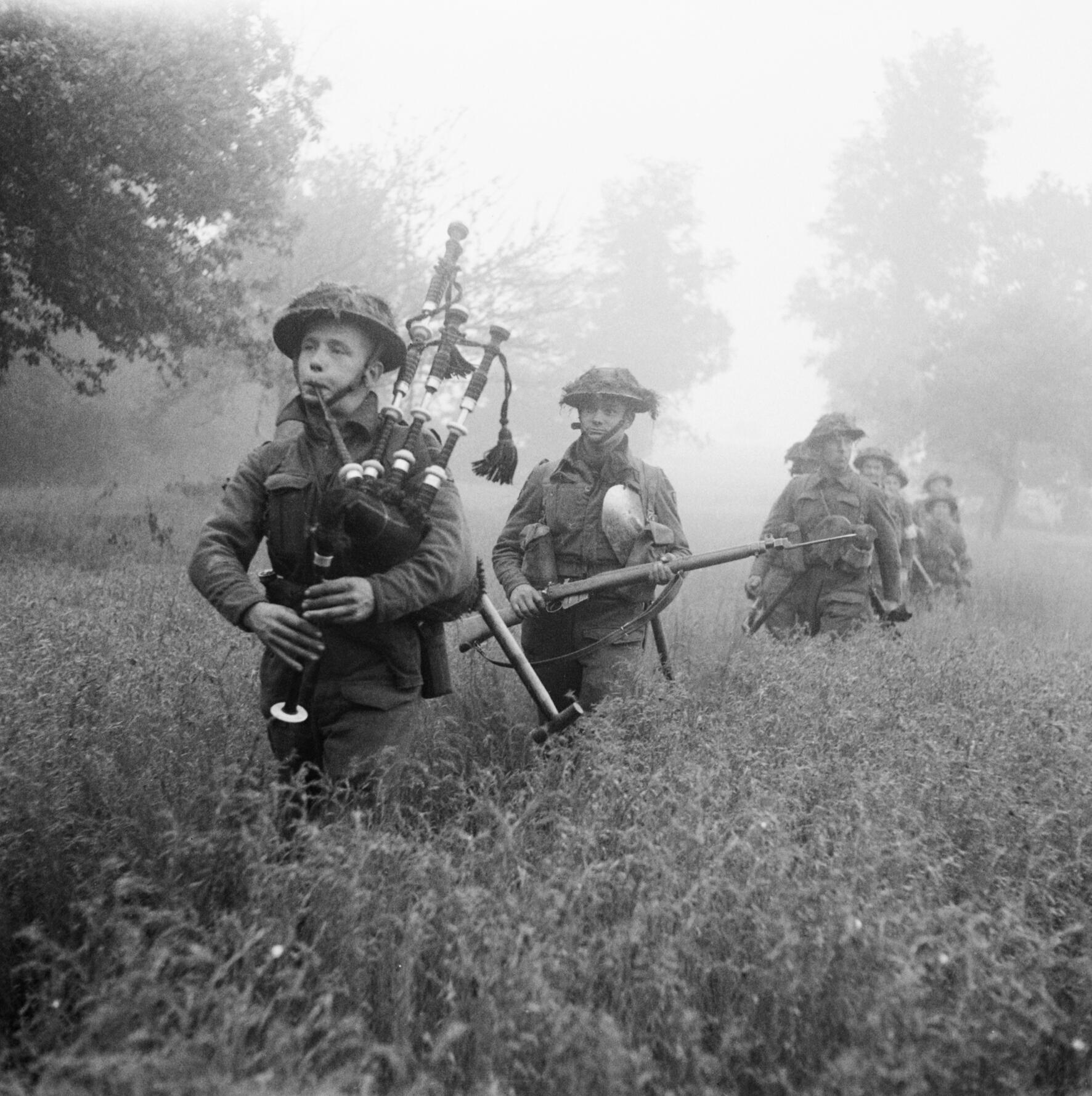
Led by their piper, men of the 7th Seaforth Highlanders, 15th (Scottish) Infantry Division advance during Operation Epsom, 26 June 1944.

The great Highland bagpipe (Scottish Gaelic: a' phìob mhòr pronounced [ə ˌfiːp ˈvoːɾ] lit. 'the great pipe') is a type of bagpipe native to Scotland, and the Scottish analogue to the great Irish warpipes. It has acquired widespread recognition through its usage in the British military and in pipe bands throughout the world.

The bagpipe of any kind is first attested in Scotland around 1400. The earliest references to bagpipes in Scotland are in a military context, and it is in that context that the great Highland bagpipe became established in the British military and achieved the widespread prominence it enjoys today, whereas other bagpipe traditions throughout Europe, ranging from Portugal to Russia, almost universally went into decline by the late 19th and early 20th century.

Though widely famous for its role in military and civilian pipe bands, the great Highland bagpipe is also used for a solo virtuosic style called pìobaireachd, ceòl mòr, or simply pibroch. Through development over the centuries, the great Highland bagpipes probably reached something like their distinctive modern form in the 18th century.

== History ==
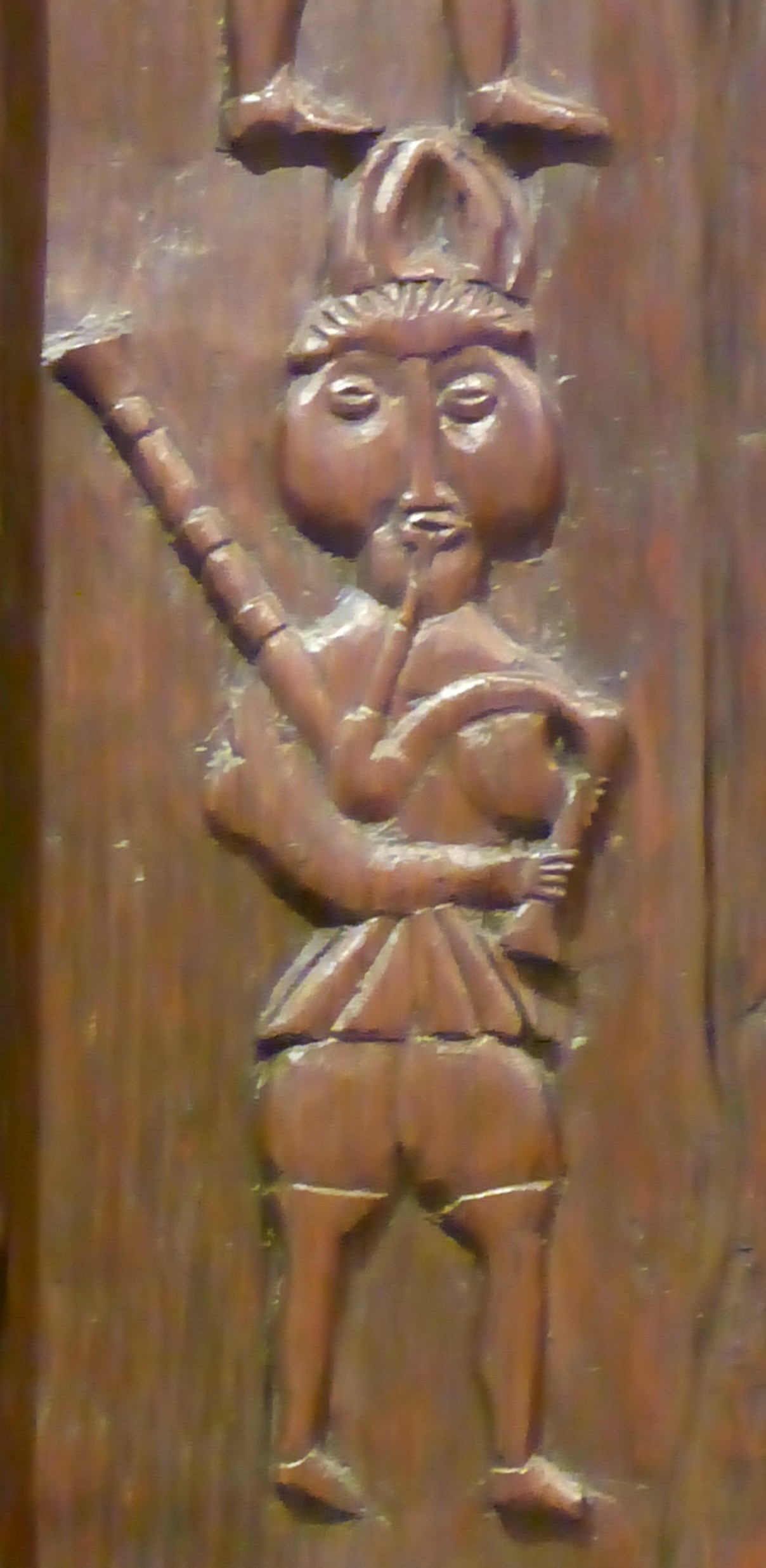
Bagpiper carved around 1600

Though popular belief sets varying dates for the introduction of bagpipes to Scotland, concrete evidence is limited until approximately the 15th century. One clan still owns a remnant of a set of bagpipes said to have been carried at the Battle of Bannockburn in 1314, though the veracity of this claim is debated. There are many ancient legends and stories about bagpipes which were passed down through minstrels and oral tradition, whose origins are now lost. However, textual evidence for Scottish bagpipes is more definite in 1396, when records of the Battle of the North Inch of Perth reference "warpipes" being carried into battle. These references may be considered evidence as to the existence of particularly Scottish bagpipes, but evidence of a form peculiar to the Highlands appears in a poem written in 1598 and later published in The Complaynt of Scotland which refers to several types of pipe, including the Highland: "On hieland pipes, Scotte and Hybernicke / Let heir be shraichs of deadlie clarions."

In 1746, after the forces loyal to the Hanoverian government had defeated the Jacobites in the Battle of Culloden, King George II attempted to assimilate the Highlands into Great Britain by weakening Gaelic culture and the Scottish clan system, though the oft-repeated claim that the Act of Proscription 1746 banned the Highland bagpipes is not substantiated by the text itself, nor by any record of any prosecutions under this act for playing or owning bagpipes. However, the loss of the clan chief's power and patronage and widespread emigration did contribute to its decline. It was soon realised that Highlanders made excellent troops and a number of regiments were raised from the Highlands over the second half of the eighteenth century. Although the early history of pipers within these regiments is not well documented, there is evidence that these regiments had pipers at an early stage and there are numerous accounts of pipers playing into battle during the 19th century, a practice which continued into World War I when it was abandoned after the early battles, due to the high casualty rate.

The custom was revived by the 51st Highland Division for their assault on the enemy lines at the start of the Second Battle of El Alamein on 23 October 1943. Each attacking company was led by a piper, playing tunes that would allow other units to recognise which Highland regiment they belonged to. Although the attack was successful, losses among the pipers were high, and they were not used in combat again during the war. Bill Millin, the personal piper of Simon Fraser, 15th Lord Lovat, was at the landing of 1st Special Service Brigade at Sword Beach on 6 June 1944 in Normandy. At Lovat's request he marched up and down the beach playing his pipes under fire. The Calgary Highlanders had company pipers play during the unit's first battle in Normandy in July 1944, but likewise refrained from using pipers again for the rest of the war. A final use of the pipes in combat was in 1967 during the Aden Emergency, when 1st Battalion, The Argyll and Sutherland Highlanders were led into the rebel-held Crater district by their pipe major playing the regimental marches.

== Design ==
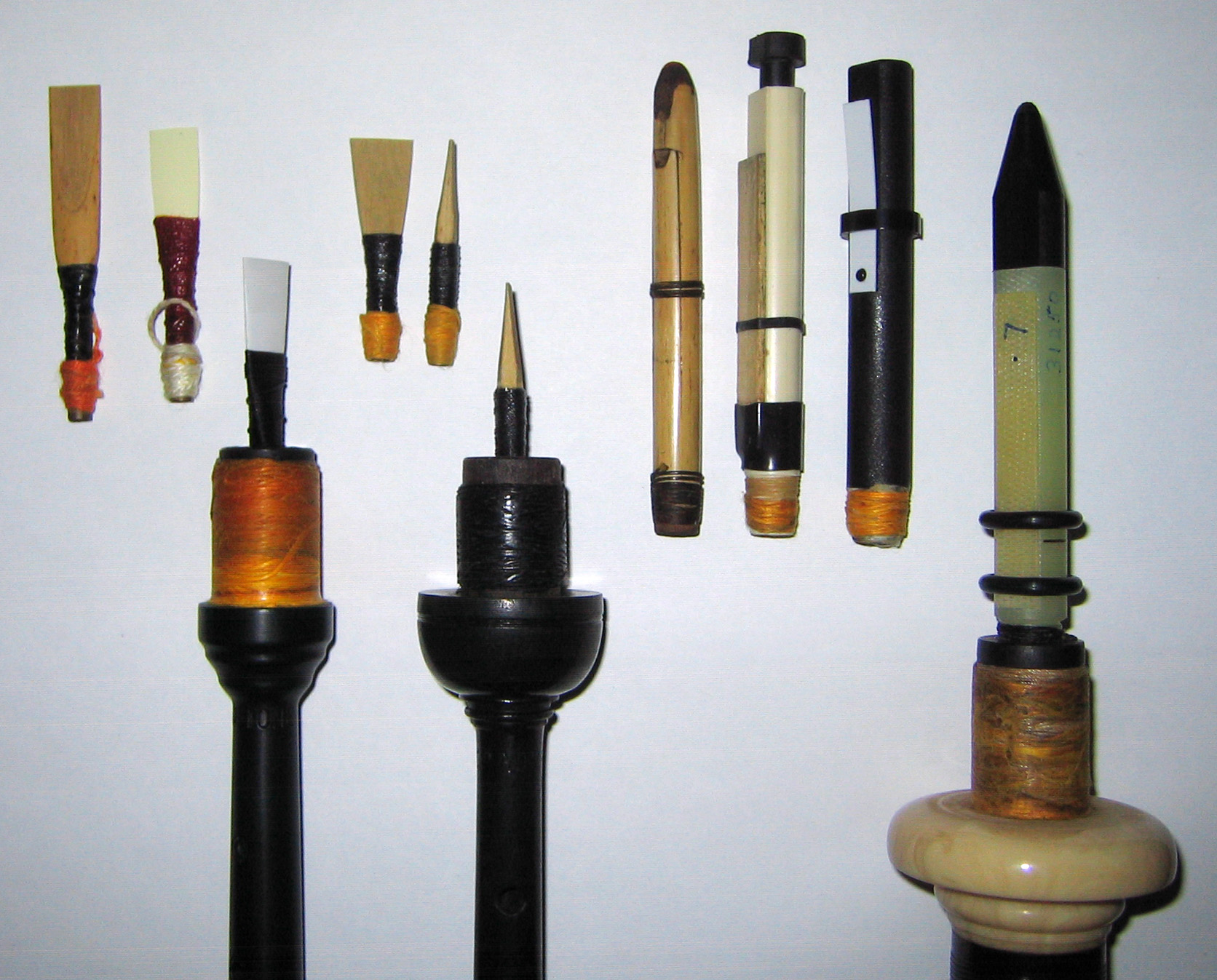
A selection of bagpipe reeds of various design, chanter reeds on the left, drone reeds on the right

The great Highland bagpipe is classified as a woodwind instrument, like the bassoon, oboe, and clarinet. Although it is further classified as a double-reed instrument, the reeds are all closed inside the wooden "stocks", instead of being played directly by mouth as most other woodwinds are. The great Highland bagpipe actually has four reeds: the chanter reed (double), two tenor drone reeds (single), and one bass drone reed (single).

A modern set has a bag, a chanter, a blowpipe, two tenor drones, and one bass drone.

The scale of the chanter is approximately in the Mixolydian mode, which has a flattened seventh scale degree, though many older pipes are set to a standard Ionian mode with a half step seventh note to the high A - essentially (on the piano) this is like a C major scale with a B♭ below the middle C. It has a range from one whole tone lower than the tonic to one octave above it. The drones are tuned to this tonic note, called A (specifically A_{4}). The nine notes of the chanter scale are "low G, low A, B, C (sounds as a C♯), D, E, F (sounds as a F♯), high G, and high A". The A pitch of most pipers and pipe bands was historically close to the present-day standard pitch where A_{4} = 440 Hz, but currently is tuned somewhere around 470–480 Hz, or slightly above the standard pitch B♭ (466.16 Hz) The low G and low A are tuned an octave below their high counterparts. Highland bagpipe music is written in the key of A with no key signature, or in D major, where the C and F are understood to be sharp but are not denoted as such.

Traditionally, certain notes were sometimes tuned slightly off from just intonation. For example, on some old chanters the D and high G would be somewhat sharp. According to Forsyth (1935), the C and F holes were traditionally bored exactly midway between those for B and D and those for E and G, respectively, resulting in approximately a quarter-tone difference from just intonation, somewhat like a "blue" note in jazz. Today, however, the notes of the chanter are usually tuned in just intonation to the Mixolydian scale, with the G tuned to the harmonic seventh which is significantly flatter than the just minor seventh or the equal temperament minor seventh.

== Materials ==
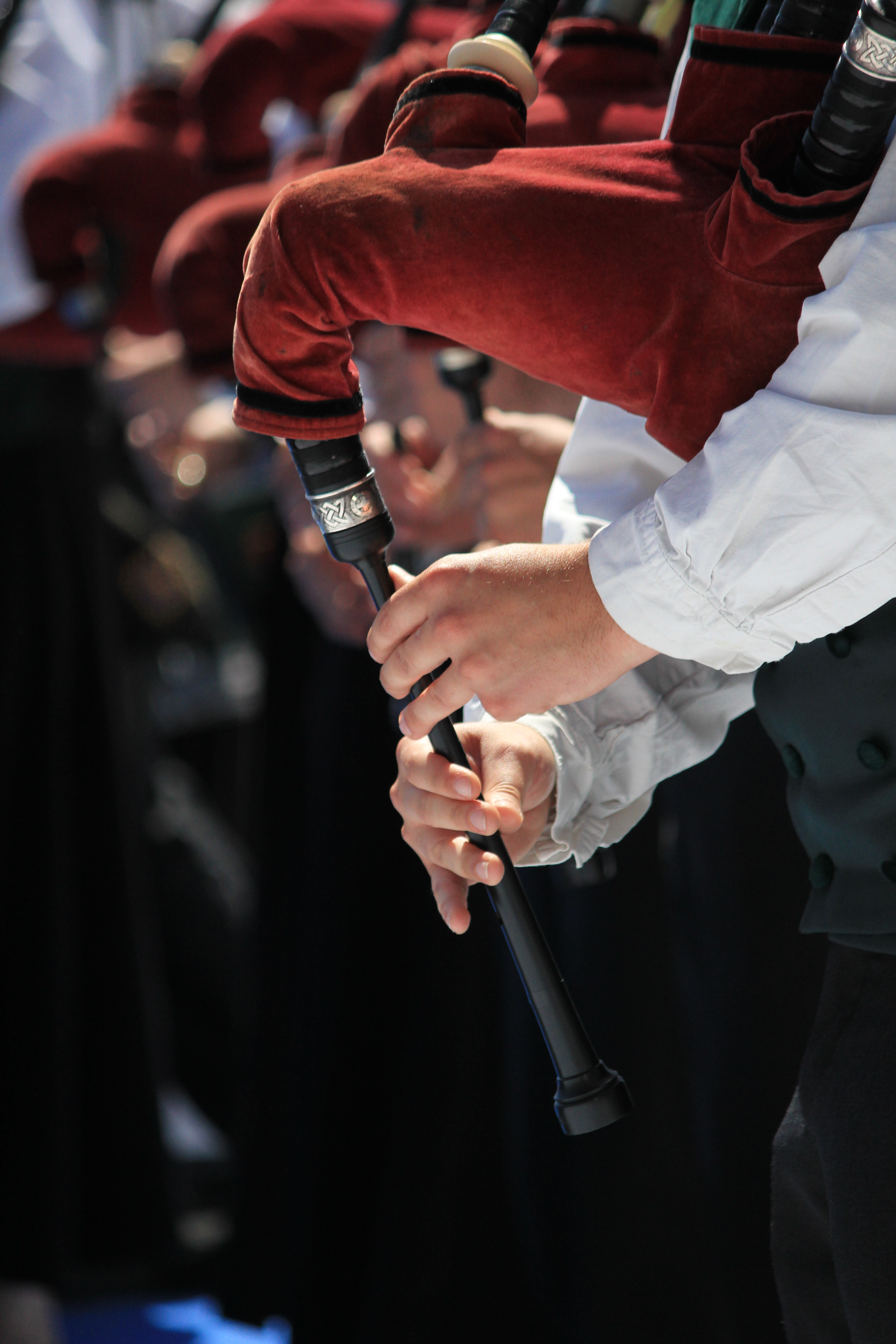

According to popular stories Highland pipes were originally constructed of locally available woods like European holly, laburnum, and boxwood. However, evidence from collections and records contradict this instead showing that pipes were made by Lowland professional turners using imported tropical hardwoods woods such as cocuswood (from the Caribbean) due its superior resistance to splitting or chipping. In the modern day, synthetic materials, particularly Polypenco, have become quite popular, especially among pipe bands where uniformity of chanters is desirable.

Ornamentation on stands of pipes can be made from: ivory, horn, nickel, German silver, silver, stainless steel, imitation ivory (often catalin or possibly bakelite depending on the year the pipes were made), or other exotic woods.

== Music ==
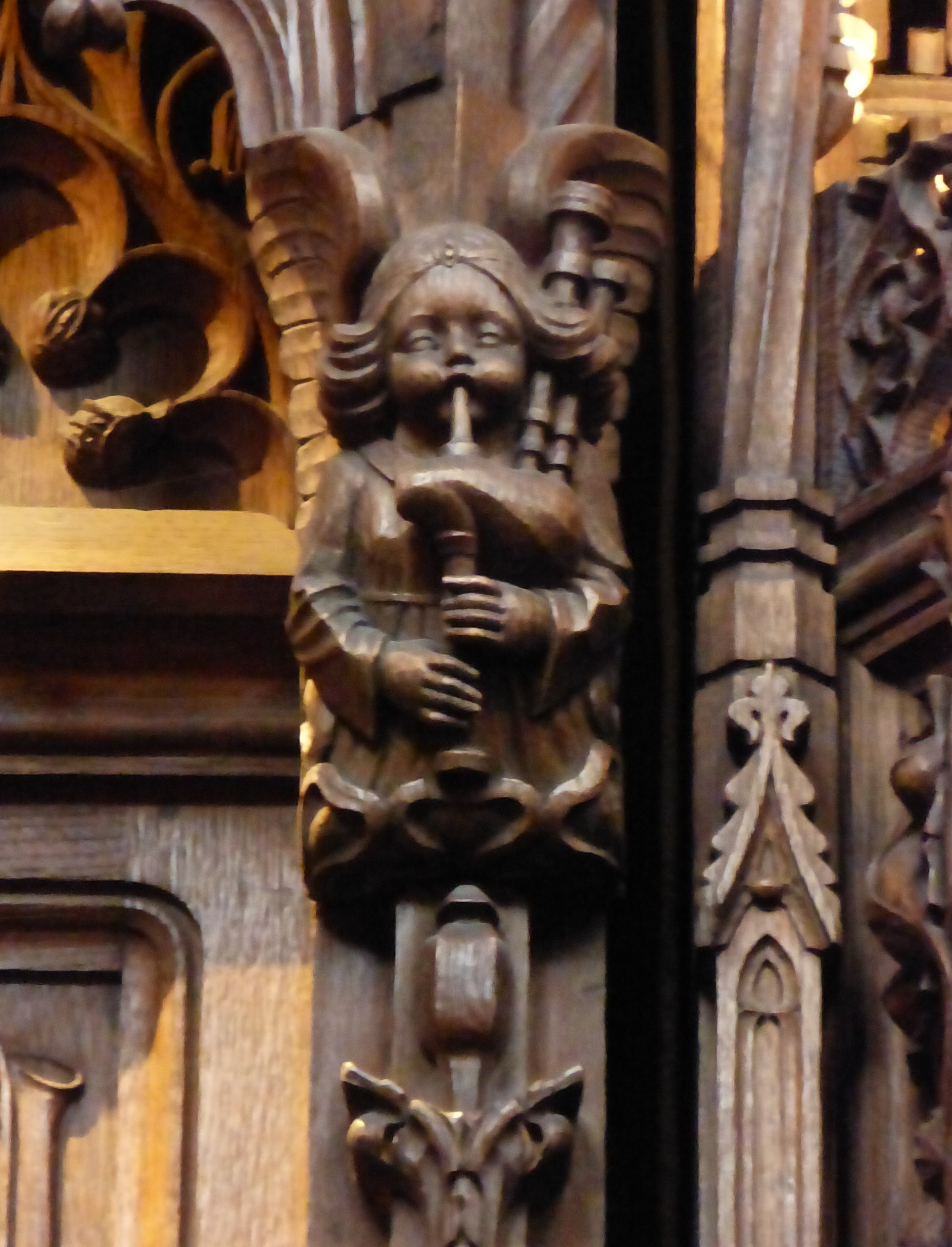
Angel playing bagpipes in the Thistle Chapel, Edinburgh

Compared to many other musical instruments, the great Highland bagpipe is limited by its range (nine notes), lack of dynamics, and the enforced legato style, due to the continuous airflow from the bag. The great Highland bagpipe is a closed reed instrument, which means that the four reeds are completely encased within the instrument and the player cannot change the sound of the instrument via mouth position or tonguing. As a result, notes cannot be separated by simply stopping blowing or tonguing, so grace notes and combinations of grace notes, called "embellishments", are used for this purpose. These are more complicated ornaments using two or more grace notes include doublings, taorluaths, throws, grips, and birls. There are also a set of ornaments usually used for pìobaireachd, for example the dare, vedare, chedare, darado, taorluath and crunluath. Some of these embellishments have found their way into light music over the course of the 20th century. These embellishments are also used for note emphasis, for example to emphasize the beat note or other phrasing patterns. These three single grace notes (G, D, and E) are the most commonly used and are often played in succession. All grace notes are performed rapidly, by quick finger movements, giving an effect similar to tonguing or articulation on modern wind instruments. Due to the lack of rests and dynamics, all expression in great Highland bagpipe music comes from the use of embellishments and to a larger degree by varying the duration of notes. Despite the fact that most great Highland bagpipe music is highly rhythmically regimented and structured, proper phrasing of all types of great Highland bagpipe music relies heavily on the ability of the player to stretch specific notes within a phrase or measure. In particular, the main beats and off-beats of each phrase are structured. However, sub-divisions within each beat are flexible.

Music for the great Highland bagpipe is divided into piobaireachd and light music.

The Scottish Gaelic word pìobaireachd literally means "piping", but it has been adapted into English as piobaireachd or pibroch. In Gaelic, this, the "great music" of the great Highland bagpipe is referred to as ceòl mòr. Ceòl mòr consists of a slow "ground" movement (Scottish Gaelic: ùrlar) which is a simple theme, then a series of increasingly complex variations on this theme, and ends with a return to the ground. The ceòl mòr style was developed by the well-patronized dynasties of bagpipers – MacArthurs, MacGregors, Rankins, and especially the MacCrimmons – and seems to have emerged as a distinct form during the 17th century.

"Light music" is also referred to as ceòl beag. Ceòl beag includes marches (2/4, 4/4,), dance tunes (particularly strathspeys, reels, hornpipes, and jigs), slow airs, and more. A common combination, particularly for competition purposes, is the march, strathspey, and reel (MSR).

Bagpipes are rarely played with other instruments due to their tuning. Most other instruments are tuned at standard concert pitch (440 Hz), whilst a bagpipe is tuned around 470–480 Hz. It is possible to change the pitch by using different chanters and reeds. "Few attempts have been made hitherto to combine the bagpipes with classical orchestral instruments, due mainly to conflicts of balance and tuning," said composer Graham Waterhouse about his work Chieftain's Salute Op. 34a for Great Highland Bagpipe and String Orchestra (2001). "A satisfactory balance was achieved in this piece by placing the piper at a distance from the orchestra." Peter Maxwell Davies' Orkney Wedding, With Sunrise (1985) also features a great Highland Bagpipe solo towards the end.

== Cultural role ==
The great Highland bagpipe plays a role as both a solo and ensemble instrument. In ensembles, it is generally played as part of a pipe band. One notable form of solo employment is the position of Piper to the Sovereign, a position dating back to the time of Queen Victoria.

== Popular music ==
The great Highland bagpipes have played a minor, but not insignificant role in rock and pop music. Well-known examples of songs giving prominence to bagpipes include:

- "Mull of Kintyre" by Wings featuring the Campbeltown Pipe Band
- "Are you ready to rock?" by Wizzard, played by Roy Wood
- "It's a Long Way to the Top (If You Wanna Rock 'n' Roll)" by AC/DC played by Bon Scott
- "Come Talk to Me" by Peter Gabriel, played by Chris Ormston
- "Shoots and Ladders" by Korn, played by Jonathan Davis (plus numerous other songs throughout their discography)

== Worldwide diffusion ==
The great Highland bagpipe is widely used by both soloists and pipe bands, both civilian and military, and is now played in countries around the world. It is particularly popular in areas with large Scottish and Irish emigrant populations, mainly England, Canada, the United States, Australia, New Zealand and South Africa.

=== Former British Empire ===
The great Highland bagpipe has also been adopted by many countries that were formerly part of the British Empire, despite their lack of a Scottish or Irish population. These countries include India, Pakistan, Nepal, Malaysia and Singapore.

The great Highland bagpipe also spread to parts of Africa and the Middle East where the British military's use of pipes made a favourable impression. Piping spread to Arabic countries such as Jordan, Egypt and Oman, some of whom had previously existing bagpipe traditions. In Oman, the instrument is called habban and is used in cities such as Muscat, Salalah, and Sohar. In Uganda president Idi Amin forbade the export of African blackwood, to encourage local bagpipe construction, during the 1970s.

=== Thailand ===
The great Highland bagpipe was also adopted in Thailand; around 1921, King Rama VI ordered a set to accompany the marching exercises of the Sua Pa Wild Tiger Corps. This was a royal guard unit which had previously practiced to the sounds of an oboe called pi chawa.

Although the bagpipes arrived from the British Isles with a user's manual, no one was able to figure out how to play them, so bassoon player Khun Saman Siang-prajak went to the British Embassy and learned how to play the instrument with the British soldiers, and then became instructor to the rest of the Corps. The band, which plays Thai as well as Scottish tunes, still practices at Vachiravuth High School in Bangkok, which is named for Rama VI.

=== Brittany ===
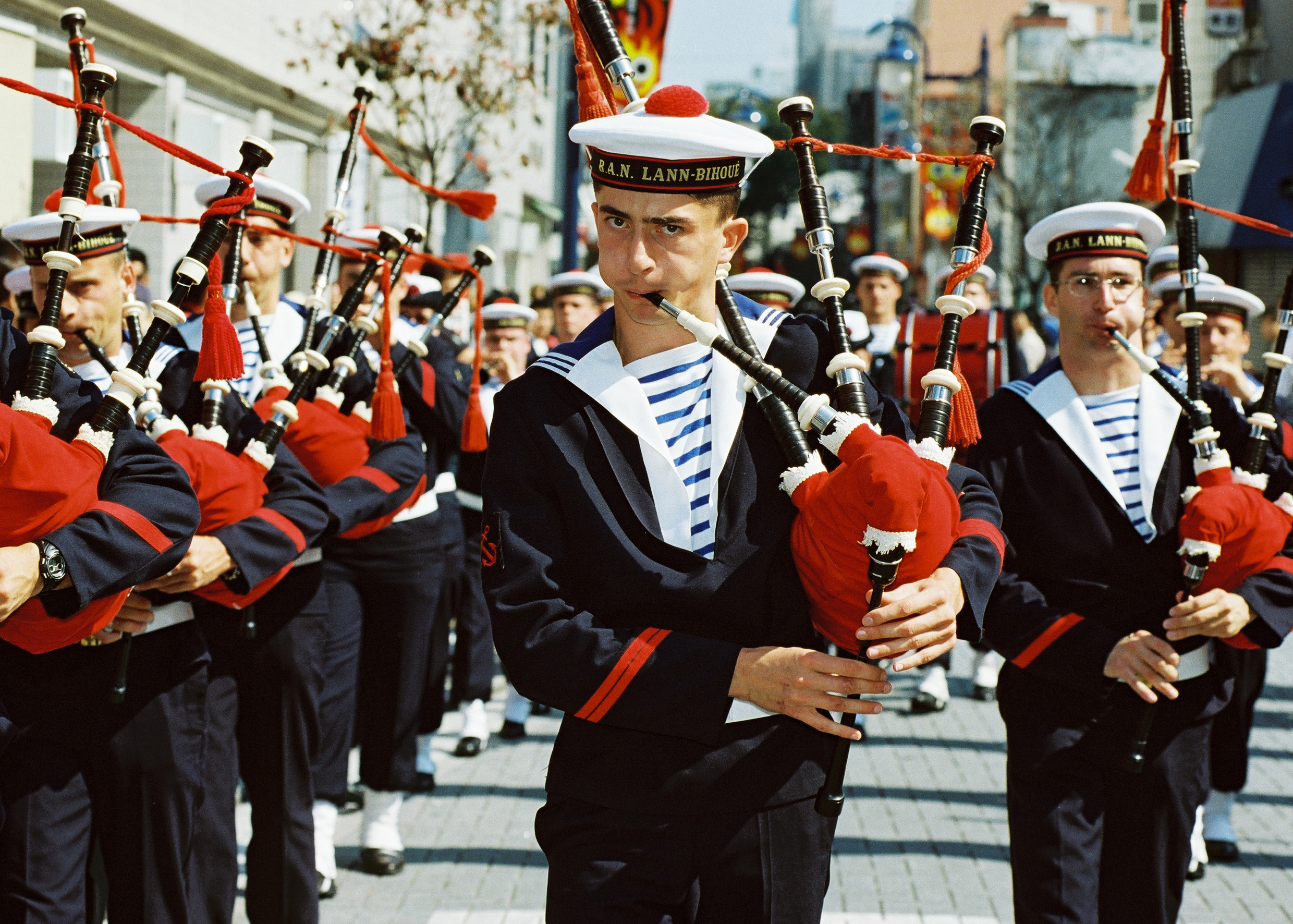
The Breton bagad of Lann-Bihoué of the French Navy.

During the First World War, some Breton pipers serving in the French Army came in contact with the pipers of Scottish regiments, and brought back home a few great Highland bagpipes which Breton pipe-makers started copying. Polig Monjarret led the introduction of the Great Highland bagpipe to Brittany during the Celtic revival of the 1920s Breton folk music scene, inventing the bagad, a pipe band incorporating a binioù braz section, a bombarde section, a drums section, and in recent years almost any added grouping of wind instruments such as the saxophones, and brass instruments such as the trumpet and trombone.

Well known bagadoù include Bagad Kemper, Kevrenn Alre, Bagad Brieg and Bagad Cap Caval. In Brittany, the great Highland bagpipe is known as the binioù braz, in contrast to the binioù kozh, the small traditional Breton bagpipe.

One notable development of the Highland bagpipe in Brittany is the creation of slightly shorter drones in C (Scottish "B"; see notes on tuning above), so that the many tunes played in that key will have drone accompaniment in the tonic. Many bagad pipers will keep two sets of pipes, one in standard B♭ (Scottish "A") and one in C, and a whole suite may be performed in C.

== Notable bands ==
Musicians from The City of Auckland Pipe Band playing "Amazing Grace" during the festival interceltique de Lorient in 2016.

Some of the most famous pipe bands in the world are the Strathclyde Police Pipe Band, Shotts and Dykehead Caledonia Pipe Band, Simon Fraser University Pipe Band, The Inveraray & District Pipe Band (the reigning world champions), The Field Marshal Montgomery Pipe Band, The St. Laurence O'Toole Pipe Band and Peoples Ford Boghall and Bathgate Caledonia Pipe Band, all of which have won the World Pipe Band Championships.

== Related instruments ==
- Border pipes are similar to the great Highland bagpipe, but quieter and thus suited to playing for dances and sessions. Rather than being inflated by mouth, their air is provided by bellows under the arm.
- Brian Boru bagpipes, invented by Henry Starck, perhaps inspired by the Great Irish Warpipes, and based on the great Highland bagpipe but with a keyed chanter to extend the range and add chromatic notes.
- Electronic bagpipes are electronic instruments with a touch-sensitive "chanter" which senses finger position and modifies its tone accordingly. Some models also produce a drone sound, and the majority are made to simulate great Highland bagpipe tone and fingering.
- Great Irish Warpipes an instrument, believed to have existed in Ireland until around the 1700s, and to have been similar or practically identical to the extant Great Highland Bagpipe.
- Northumbrian smallpipes are bellows-blown bagpipes consisting of one chanter, generally with keys and usually four drones.
- Practice chanter, a bagless and droneless double-reeded pipe with the same fingerings as the great Highland bagpipe. These are meant to serve as practice instruments which are more portable and less expensive than a set of pipes.
- Practice goose, a small, single-chanter, droneless bag used to transition between the practice chanter and full pipes
- Reel pipes (or "kitchen" or "parlour" pipes), smaller versions of the great Highland bagpipe for indoor playing
- Scottish smallpipes are a modern interpretation of extinct smaller Scottish pipes used for recreational music. They were revived in the late 20th century by pipemakers such as Colin Ross.

== See also ==
- Music of Scotland
- Canntaireachd

== Bibliography ==
- Hugh Cheape. The Book of the Bagpipe (Belfast: The Appletree Press, 1999).
- Francis Collinson. The Traditional and National Music of Scotland (London: Routledge & Kegan Paul, 1966).
- Francis Collinson. The Bagpipe (London and Boston: Routledge & Kegan Paul, 1975).
- William Donaldson. The Highland Pipe and Scottish Society 1750–1950 (Edinburgh: Tuckwell Press, 1999).
- John Gibson. Old and New World Highland Bagpiping (Montreal & Kingston: McGill-Queen's University Press, 2002).
