= Fling =

Fling may refer to:

== Arts and entertainment ==
- "Fling", a 1999 episode of the television series Zoboomafoo
- The Fling, a 2001 Hank the Cowdog book
- Fling (film), a 2008 American comedy film

=== Dance ===
- Fling (Irish), a traditional Irish musical form and dance
- Highland Fling, a traditional Scottish dance

=== Music ===
- "Fling", a song by Built to Spill from the 1994 album There's Nothing Wrong with Love
- "Fling", a song by Girls Aloud from the 2007 album Tangled Up
- The Fling (band), a 2007 American rock group
- "Fling", a song by Jane Remover on the 2023 album Census Designated

== Other uses ==
- Casual dating
- Struggle Front for the National Independence of Guinea, founded 1962, Portuguese: Frente de Luta pela Independência Nacional da Guiné (FLING)
- Fling, a 2009 candy product in a shiny pink and silver package marketed towards women made by Mars, Incorporated
- Fling a defunct 2014 messenger app that enabled users to send images to random strangers around the world

== See also ==
- Flingo, now Samba TV, a smart-TV app
- Flying (disambiguation)
