= Hamish Forbes =

Major Sir Hamish Stewart Forbes, 7th Baronet, MBE, MC, KStJ (15 February 1916 – 3 September 2007) was a British Army officer who served in the Welsh Guards in World War II, spending over five years in German custody as a prisoner of war. In later life, he was patron of the Lonach Highland and Friendly Society from 1984 until his death.

== Early life ==
Forbes was born in London. He was the second son of Lieutenant Colonel James Forbes and his wife, Feridah Taylor. He was educated at Eton College, at Lawrenceville School in the United States, and at the School of Oriental and African Studies in London.

Before World War II, he worked for health salts manufacturer Eno and for sugar broker Czarnikow.

== Military career ==
Forbes was commissioned as a subaltern in the 1st Welsh Guards in 1939. After a short period in Gibraltar, he served as battalion intelligence officer in the British Expeditionary Force in France in 1940. Leading a reconnaissance patrol near Arras in May 1940, he was captured by the Germans. He was later awarded the Military Cross for his conduct.

He was held in a series of German prisoner-of-war camps until the end of the war, but was involved in at least 10 attempts to escape from the four prisoner of war camps in which he was detained. He and six others escaped from Oflag IX-A/Z at Rotenburg. He was quickly recaptured and jailed. He was involved in three attempts to escape from Oflag VII-C at Laufen, and three further attempts at Oflag VI-B at Dössel (now part of Warburg).

He was moved to Oflag VII-B at Eichstätt then back to Oflag IX-A/Z, where another escape bought him eight days of liberty. Recaptured and marched west with other prisoners to prevent being released by the advancing Red Army, he slipped out of the column and managed to reach forward units of the advancing First United States Army, and was quickly returned to England.

His escape attempts led to a mention in dispatches in 1945, upgraded to an MBE (Military Division).

He continued to serve in the Welsh Guards after the war, in England, Germany and with CENTO forces in Turkey. He retired from the Army as a major in 1958.

== Later life ==
After leaving the British Army, he worked for Calmic Chemicals, Gillette and Shell-Mex & BP until 1964. He was also an amateur painter and sculptor. He retired to Strathdon in Aberdeenshire.

== Affiliations ==
He was General Secretary of the Church Lads' Brigade from 1964 to 1973, resigning to become Secretary of the Order of St John from 1973 to 1983, and President of the Church Lads' and Church Girls' Brigade Association from 1974 to 2000. He succeeded his third cousin, Colonel Sir John Stewart Forbes, to be the 7th Baronet in 1984, and also became patron of the Lonach Highland Society that year.

The Society was founded in 1822 by his ancestor Sir Charles Forbes, the 1st Baronet, to preserve and promote Highland culture and the Scottish Gaelic language.

== Personal life ==
He married twice. He married Jacynthe Underwood in 1945, and they had a son and three daughters. They divorced in 1981. He remarried later that same year, to Mary Christine Rigby (MBE).

== Death ==
He died in Aberdeen, Scotland and was survived by his second wife, and son and daughters from his first marriage. His son, James, succeeded him as 8th Baronet.

== Coat of arms ==
Coat of arms of Hamish Forbes
Crest A falcon rising proper. Escutcheon Quarterly: 1st and 4th azure, three bears' heads couped argent, muzzled gules (Forbes), 2nd and 3rd, azure, three cinquefoils argent (Fraser). Supporters Two bears argent, muzzled gules. Motto Altius ibunt qui ad summa nituntur (They will attain a higher point, who strive at things the most exalted)

== Sources ==
- Obituary, The Times, 20 September 2007
- Obituary, The Herald, 20 September 2007
- Obituary, The Daily Telegraph, 28 September 2007
- Obituary, The Herald, 6 September 2007

Baronetage of the United Kingdom
Preceded by John Stewart Forbes	Baronet (of Newe); 1984–2007	Succeeded by James Stewart Forbes
