= Highland Laddie =

Scottish song

"Highland Laddie" (Roud 2330), also known as "Hielan' Laddie", "Bonnie Highland Laddie", "Where Have You Been All the Day", or "If Thou'lt Play Me Fair Play", is the name of a Scottish popular folk tune with many variants. Robert Burns' poem "Highland Laddie" is one popular set of lyrics often sung to the tune, with the work song/sea shanty "Donkey Riding" being another well-known variant.

Highland Regiments raised in the 18th and early 19th centuries employed many unique symbols to differentiate themselves from other regiments and enlisted distinctive music to announce their arrival, but as a result of the Cardwell Reforms of 1881, all British Army Highland Regiments were required to use "Highland Laddie" as their regimental march. Over time, many of these regiments had managed to return to their pre-Cardwell marches when, in March 2006, the establishment of the Royal Regiment of Scotland saw the disappearance of all Scotland's historic infantry regiments and their distinctions, including music, and the adoption of a new regimental march, "Scotland the Brave".

== Regiments ==
"Highland Laddie" continues to be the regimental march of a number of Commonwealth regiments with Scottish affiliations. Some of these regiments include:

United Kingdom

- The Royal Scots Dragoon Guards
- The Scots Guards
- The London Scottish
- The Tyneside Scottish

Canada

- 42nd Field Artillery Regiment (Lanark and Renfrew Scottish), RCA
- The Black Watch (Royal Highland Regiment) of Canada
- The Royal Highland Fusiliers of Canada
- The Cape Breton Highlanders formerly 2nd Battalion, The Nova Scotia Highlanders
- The Essex and Kent Scottish
- 48th Highlanders of Canada
- The Lake Superior Scottish Regiment
- The Calgary Highlanders (10th Canadians)

Australia

- 16th Battalion (The Cameron Highlanders of Western Australia)
- 41st Battalion, Royal New South Wales Regiment (The Byron Regiment)
- The Adelaide Universities Regiment
- 3rd Battalion, Royal Australian Regiment

New Zealand

- 1st Armoured Car Regiment (New Zealand Scottish)

Republic of India

- 9 Gorkha Rifles (1st Battalion 9 Gorkha Rifles)

Sri Lanka

- Gemunu Watch

== Dances ==
=== Highland dance ===
Highland laddie is also the name of a dance in Scottish Highland dancing, of the "national dance" subtype. This version of the dance was first published by D. G. MacLennan in 1952, who referred to it as a Hebridean dance, collected by MacLennan in 1925 from Archie MacPherson on the island of South Uist. MacLennan himself suggested "a more effective finishing" of the dance, with entrechat at the end. Most national dances are usually danced by females in an Aboyne dress, but the Highland laddie is one of two national dances that are typically danced in the standard kilt-based outfit, the other being "Wilt thou go to the barracks, Johnny?".

=== Scottish step dances ===
Highland (or Hielan') laddie is the name of several Scottish soft-shoe step dances, different from the national dance mentioned above. Two different dances of this name have been taught in Scottish (ladies) step dance classes within the frame of the RSCDS Summer Schools in St Andrews, Scotland. Yet another version, collected by Jack McConachie and published in 1972 is now commonly referred to as Hebridean laddie. There are reasons to believe that dances taught by Jack McConachie as Hebridean, namely flowers of Edinburgh and bonnie Dundee, originally used to be danced to the music of "Hielan' Laddie" as well.

== Settings ==
As a tune with martial affiliations Highland Laddie is still widely played by the regimental bands and/or pipes and drums of the Scottish regiments. As a traditional Scottish tune, Highland Laddie is also commonly played on the bagpipes for Scottish dances. Typically categorised as a quick march "Highland Laddie" is normally written in 2/4 time. The "standard" setting contains two parts (8 bars per part). As with any of the older melodies, variations have been composed and some published with the most distinctive settings appearing in Pipe Major William Ross' 1885 book containing eight parts to "Highland Laddie".

Ludwig van Beethoven composed a classical arrangement of the song in 1815, published in his 25 Scottish Songs.

== Canadian settings ==
"Highland Laddie" appears as the most frequently used regimental march in the Canadian Armed Forces and demonstrates a variety of settings depending upon which music book and/or instructor was used in any particular area. Some regiments play two parts and some a four-part version as their regimental march. Not all the parts are in the same order and some are not played at all.

== Lyrics ==
Numerous lyrics for the tune exist.

=== Jacobite rebellion ===
Where ha' ye been a' the day?
Bonnie laddie, Hielan' laddie
Saw ye him that' far awa'
Bonnie laddie, Hielan' laddie

On his head a bonnet blue
Bonnie laddie, Hielan' laddie
Tartan plaid and Hielan' trews
Bonnie laddie, Hielan' laddie

When he drew his gude braid-sword
Then he gave his royal word.
Frae the field he ne'er wad flee
Wi' his friends wad live or dee.

Geordie sits in Charlie's chair
But I think he'll no bide there.
Charlie yet shall mount the throne
Weel ye ken it is his own.

=== Sea shanty ===
Was you ever in Quebec?
Bonny laddie, Highland laddie,
Loading timber on the deck,
My bonny Highland laddie.

High-ho, and away she goes,
Bonny laddie, Highland laddie,
High-ho, and away she goes,
My bonny Highland laddie.

Was you ever in Callao
Where the girls are never slow?

Was you ever in Baltimore
Dancing on the sanded floor?

Was you ever in Mobile Bay,
Screwing cotton by the day?

Was you on the Brummalow,
Where Yankee boys are all the go?

=== Four-part variation ===
The Lawland Lads think they are fine
But oh they're vain and idle gaudy
How much unlike the graceful mein
And manly looks o' my Highland Laddie

If I were free at will to choose
To be the wealthiest Lawland Lady
I'd tak' young Donald without trews
Wi' bonnet blue and Highland plaidie

(Chorus):

Oh my bonnie bonnie Highland Laddie
Oh my bonnie bonnie Highland Laddie
When I was sick and like to die
He rowed me in his Highland plaidie

O'er Bently Hill wi' him I'll run
And leave my Lawland kin and daddy
Frae winters chill and summers sun
He'll screen me in his Highland plaidie

A painted room, a silken bed
Maun please a Lawland Lord and Lady
But I could kiss and be as glad
Behind a bush in his Highland plaidie

Nae greater joy I'll e'er pretend
Than that his love prove true and steady
Like mine to him, which ne'er shall end
While heaven preserves my Highland Laddie

(Repeat Chorus)

=== Beethoven ===
Bonny Laddie, Highland Laddie Beethoven Op. 108 no.7 (for Piano, Violin and Cello) Four Verses, written by James Hogg

Where got ye siller moon,
Bonnie laddie, highland laddie,
Glinting braw your belt aboon,
Bonnie laddie, highland laddie?

Belted plaid and bonnet blue,
Have ye been at Waterloo?

Weels me on your tartan trews,
Tell me, tell me a' the news!

Saw ye Boney by the way,
Blucher wi' his beard sae grey?

Or, the doure and deadly Duke,
Scatt'ring Frenchmen wi'his look?

Some say he the day may rue;
You can till gin this be true.

Would ye tell me gin ye ken,
Aught o' Donald and his men?

Tell me o' my kilted Clan,
Gin they fought, or gin they ran?

== Recordings ==
- The Kingston Trio, Make Way (1961)
- Jean Redpath, Father Adam (1979)
- The Tannahill Weavers, Passage (1983)
- Ed Miller, Scottish Voice (1993)
- Pete Seeger, The Complete Bowdoin College Concert 1960 (2011)
- Bounding Main, Kraken Up (2011)

== Notes ==
- Smith, Alexander, ed. Poems Songs and Letters being the Complete Works of Robert Burns, (The Globe Edition), London, MacMillan and Co., 1868.

== See also ==
- Authorized marches of the Canadian Forces
- Bill Millin – A piper who played the song during the Scottish landing on Sword Beach during WW2
