= Highland dance =

Competitive style of national dancing of Scotland

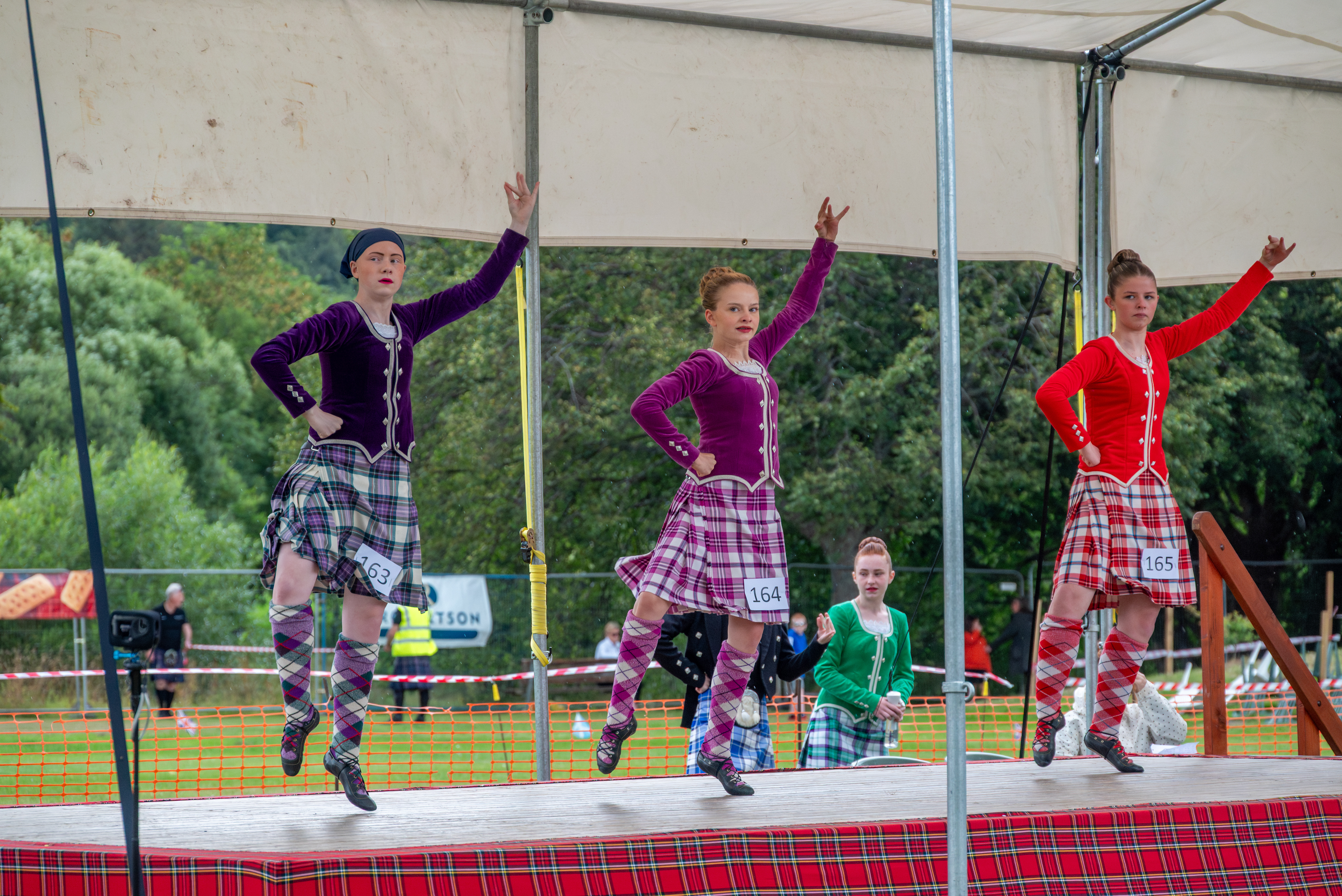
Highland Dancers compete at the Aberlour Highland Games 2026

Highland dance or Highland dancing (Scottish Gaelic: dannsa Gàidhealach) is a style of competitive dancing developed in the Scottish Highlands in the 19th and 20th centuries, in the context of competitions at public events such as the Highland games. It was created from the Gaelic folk dance repertoire, but formalised with the conventions of ballet, and has been subject to influences from outside the Highlands. Highland dancing is often performed with the accompaniment of Highland bagpipe music, and dancers wear specialised shoes called ghillies or pumps. It is now seen at nearly every modern-day Highland games event.

Highland dance should not be confused with Scottish country dance, cèilidh dancing, or clog dancing, although they too may be performed at Highland games and like competitions.

== Basic description of Highland dancing ==
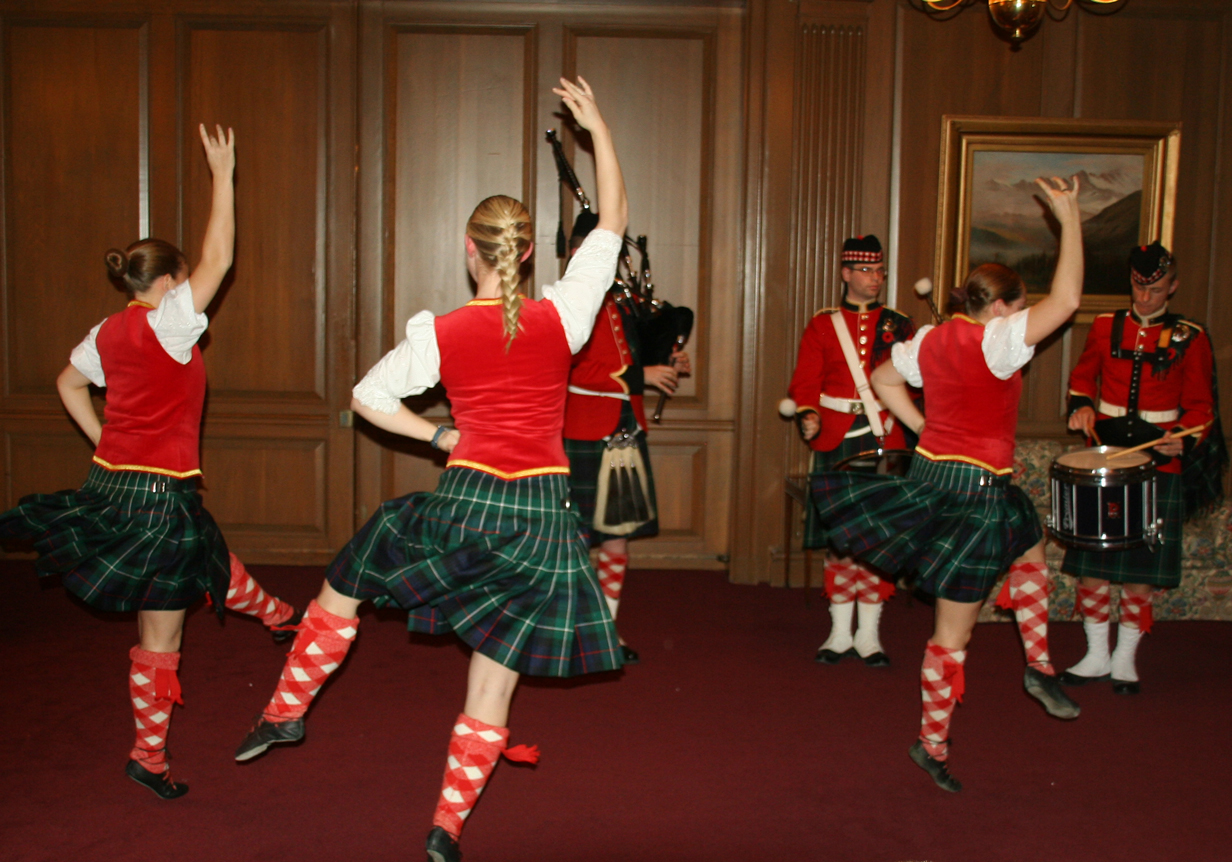
Royal Military College of Canada Scottish highland dance, piper, drummers

Highland dancing is a competitive and technical dance form requiring technique, stamina, and strength, and is recognised as a sport by the Sport Council of Scotland.

In Highland dancing, the dancers dance on the balls of the feet. Highland dancing is a form of solo step dancing, from which it evolved, but while some forms of step dancing are purely percussive in nature, Highland dancing involves not only a combination of steps but also some integral upper body, arm, and hand movements. (Dances such as strathspey or a tulloch involve up to four dances, but dancers are individually judged.)

Highland dancing should not be confused with Scottish country dancing which is both a social dance (that is, a dance which is danced with a partner or partners) like ballroom dancing, and a formation dance (that is, a dance in which an important element is the pattern of group movement about the dance floor) like square dancing.

Some Highland dances do derive from traditional social dances. An example is the Highland reel, also known as the foursome reel or strathspey, in which groups of four dancers alternate between solo steps facing one another and a figure-of-eight style with intertwining progressive movement. Even so, in competitions, the Highland reel dancers are judged individually. All but three Highland dances are danced solo and those three dances are variations of each other.

=== Scottish and Irish dancing ===
Many non-practitioners think the two Celtic forms are synonymous. While some dance studios teach both, they are two distinct styles, not just in the attire. In comparison to Scottish Highland dance, Irish dancers rarely use their arms which are held beside their bodies (rather than raised above the shoulders), legs and feet are frequently crossed (not turned out at 45°), and frequent use of the hard-soled step shoes (compared to ghillies or "pumps"). There is a greater use of choreography than traditional movements.

== History ==
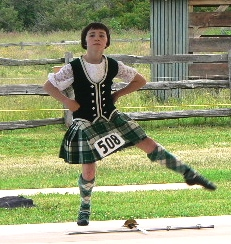
A young Highland dancer demonstrates her Scottish sword dance at the 2005 Bellingham (Washington) Highland Games

Modern Highland dancing emerged in the 19th and 20th centuries. It was "created from the Gaelic folk dance repertoire, but formalised with the conventions of ballet".

It seems that forms of sword dancing were performed by warriors in many parts of Europe in the prehistoric period. Forms of sword dancing are also attested in the late Medieval period. Ritualistic and combative dances that imitated epic deeds and martial skills were a familiar feature in Scottish tradition and folklore. The earliest reference to these dances in Scotland is mentioned in the Scotichronicon which was compiled in Scotland by Walter Bower in the 1440s. The passage regards Alexander III and his second marriage to the French noblewoman Yolande de Dreux at Jedburgh on 14 October 1285.

At the head of this procession were the skilled musicians with many sorts of pipe music including the music of bagpipes, and behind them others splendidly performing a war-dance with intricate weaving in and out. Bringing up the rear was a figure regarding whom it was difficult to decide whether it was a man or an apparition. It seemed to glide like a ghost rather than walk on feet. When it looked as if he was disappearing from everyone's sight, the whole frenzied procession halted, the song died away, the music faded, and the dancing contingent froze suddenly and unexpectedly.

In 1573, Scottish mercenaries are said to have performed a Scottish sword dance before the Swedish King, John III, at a banquet held in Stockholm Castle. The dance, 'a natural feature of the festivities', was used as part of a plot to assassinate the King, where the conspirators were able to bare their weapons without arising suspicion. Fortunately for the King, at the decisive moment the agreed signal was never given.

Sword dances and Highland dances were included at a reception for Anne of Denmark at Edinburgh in May 1590, and a mixture of sword dance and acrobatics was performed before James VI in 1617, and again for Charles I in 1633, by the Incorporation of Skinners and Glovers of Perth,

his Majesty's chair being set upon the wall next to the Water of Tay whereupon was a floating stage of timber clad about with birks, upon the which for his Majesty's welcome and entry thirteen of our brethren of this calling of Glovers with green caps, silver strings, red ribbons, white shoes and bells upon their legs, shearing rapiers in their hands and all other abulzements, danced our sword dance with many difficult knots and allapallajesse, five being under and five above upon their shoulders, three of them dancing through their feet and about them, drinking wine and breaking glasses. Which (God be praised) was acted and done without hurt or skaith to any.

In 1747, the Dress Act 1746 (which was part of the Act of Proscription 1746) came into effect which forbade the wearing of kilts by civilian men, went into effect. The act was repealed in 1782 and in the early 19th century, there was something of a romanticisation of Highland culture (or such as it was imagined to be). This revival, later boosted greatly by Queen Victoria's enthusiasm for it, included the beginnings of the Highland games as we now know them. Highland dancing was an integral part of the Games from the very start of their modern revival, but the selection of dances performed at Games was intentionally narrowed down, mostly for the convenience of judges. Therefore, while the tradition of Highland games seemed at first glance to have fostered and preserved Highland dancing, many older dances got lost because nobody considered them worthwhile to practice, as they were not required for competition. The nature of these displays and competitions also affected the style of the dancing itself.

== Organisations ==
Most dancing prior to the 1900s was not organised at a national or international level. Judges of competitions were local persons, without specific standards for attire or the steps to the danced. Local Caledonian societies trained young dancers in the way of each society. Slowly consistency of steps was achieved, and dancing-specific organisations were established.

Dancers now undergo written examinations and practical assessments to become a teacher, and then further training and testing to become a dancer examiner, then competition judge or adjudicator.

=== Royal Scottish Official Board of Highland Dancing (RSOBHD) ===
Many if not most Highland gatherings worldwide recognise the Royal Scottish Official Board of Highland Dancing (RSOBHD), formed in 1950, as the world governing body of Highland dancing. The 'Royal' title from the Queen of the United Kingdom was approved by 16 November 2019. The RSOBHD standardised dance steps for competition purposes, established rules for competitions and attire, and certifies competitions and instructors. The RSOBHD World Highland Dance Championship has been held annually at the Cowal Highland Gathering since 1934. Today this RSOBHD World Championship is sanctioned by the RSOBHD at three levels: Juvenile, Junior and Adult. Only RSOBHD-registered dancers may compete at this RSOBHD championship.

The RSOBHD is made up of representatives from many different Highland Dancing bodies and associations from around the world. The Board comprises delegates from the examining bodies (professional teaching associations), affiliated organisations in Australia (Australian Board of Highland Dancing Inc.), Canada (ScotDance Canada), South Africa (Official Board of Highland Dancing (South Africa)), New Zealand (Scot Dance New Zealand), and the United States (Federation of United States Teachers and Adjudicators) which represent the many Highland dance organisations in those countries.

The RSOBHD board sanctions Highland dancing championships although does not actually organise any of them. There are non-RSOBHD sanctioned championships run by non-RSOBHD aligned organisations at which registered RSOBHD dancers are forbidden to take part by the RSOBHD. At competitions and championships run by non-RSOBHD organisations, all dancers are welcome, however if they choose to participate they may receive a ban from the RSOBHD. Similarly, dancers not registered with the RSOBHD are forbidden to dance at RSOBHD sanctioned competitions by the RSOBHD. Each year the RSOBHD selects the championship steps to be performed by dancers at championships around the world. An official RSOBHD Highland Dance technique book for dancers and teachers has been published.

=== Other dancing bodies ===
Other organisations that qualify Highland dancers, teachers, and judges and hold competitions include:

- the Scottish Official Highland Dancing Association (SOHDA)
- the New Zealand Academy of Highland and National Dancing
- the Piping and Dancing Association of New Zealand incorporated (PDANZ)
- the Victorian Scottish Union (Australia).

Such organisations provide a wide syllabus of Highland and national dances and steps within their teaching.

=== Highland games and competitions ===
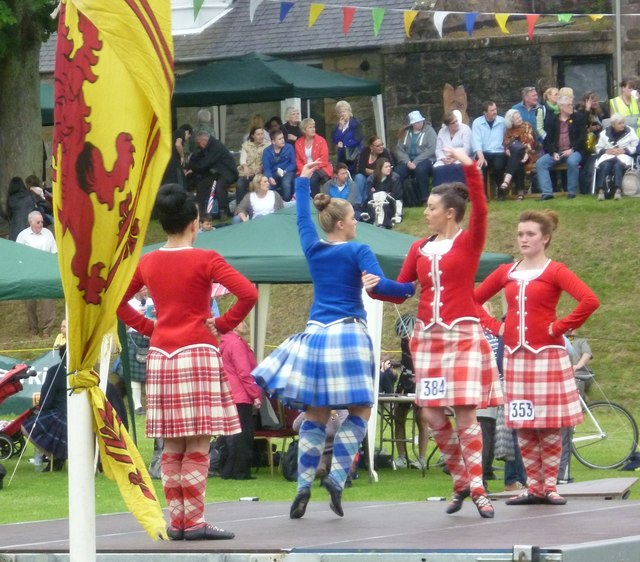
Highland dancers at the Ceres Highland Games, 2013

At Highland games, the Highland dances were at first danced only by men. Women would take part in social dances, and girls did learn solo dances as part of their general dance classes. In fact, dancing masters would often encourage their most promising students (male or female) to perform solo dances at their end-of-term 'assemblies'.

In the late 19th century a young woman named Jenny Douglas (the name of Lorna Mitchell is also suggested) decided to enter a Highland dance competition. As this was not expressly forbidden, she was allowed to enter. Since then the number of females participating in the sport has increased until today where almost all dancers are female. There have been numerous female World Champions crowned at the Cowal Highland Gathering since they began organising the competition in 1948. The first international competitor to win the Adult World Championship was Flora Stuart Grubb of Australia (1960) with Hugh Bigney being the first American to win the title in 1973. (Note: Bigney was the first American to win the adult section of World Championship in 1973, but from 1967, there had been some junior world championships from the United States too. (Ref: J Am Ethnic History, 1982.)) Indeed, the first three Adult World Championships were won by ladies: May Falconer, Motherwell (1948), Margaret Samson, Stirling (1949 and 1950). This feminisation of folk arts is a common pattern in the process of their 'gentrification', especially after they no longer serve a functional role in a male-centred, warrior culture. Males are still well represented at the world championships.

Highland dancing competitions may be held solely or as part of larger events. The small annual Scottish Glen Isla competition is almost inconspicuous on the roadside, and is beside piping events and some heavy game events. Canada's Glengarry Highland Games on the other hand is one of the largest dancing and piping events on the North American calendar. Many of Australia's competitions are held indoors as a solo activity, while Canadian and Scottish competitions are associated with Highland games with a nearby hall available in case of inclement weather. Competitions can also be held without being associated with a Highland games, usually in a local hall or sports centre. Similarly, Championships where set steps must be danced are often held inside sports centres across Scotland due to the space needed for the number of dancer.

As far as competitions were concerned, until the early 20th century the usual dances seen were the sword dance, the seann triubhas, the Strathspey and Highland reel, the reel of Tulloch, and the Highland fling. Since then, various other (pre-existing) dances have been added to the competition repertoire. For example, two character dances, The sailor's hornpipe and the Irish jig gained popularity in music hall and vaudeville productions.

=== Judging ===
Most judges today evaluate a dancer on three major criteria: timing, technique and interpretation/overall deportment.

- Timing concerns the ability of the dancer to follow the rhythm of the music.
- Technique has to do with the correct execution of the steps in coordination with the movements of the rest of the body, including head, arm and hand movements.
- Artistic interpretation covers that essential element of all dance and artistry in general which cannot be quantified or reduced to any set of rules or specific points, but which does concern the ability of the dancer or performer to convey a sense of feeling, understanding, and appreciation of the art form.
- The ability of the dancer including the jumping height and the confidence. While these may affect the final placings per dance they are not a particularly large contributing factor to most results.

The various governing bodies of Highland dancing establish parameters for the dances themselves and scoring systems to grade the dancers and determine their class and progress from one class to another. The scoring system for these competitions begins with each dancer starting with 100 points. For any mistakes, poor execution, costume issue, etc., results in subtraction of points at the judge's discretion. The dancers are then ranked from most to fewest points, with the top six scoring certain amounts of points according to the RSOBHD for sanctioned competitions, and points decided by the organiser for non-sanctioned competitions. Medals or prize money are also be given. Not every dancer gets placed in a dance.

The notion of how dances were to be executed changed dramatically over the years. For instance, doing an early-20th-century-style sword dance in a competition today would get a dancer disqualified nearly immediately. There used to be terrible confusion as to what would be allowed (or prescribed) where, until the RSOBHD came up with a standard that has become acceptable to the majority of competitive dancers.

== Types of dances ==
Scottish Highland dances are generally divided into several types. Categories are based more on outfit worn than strict style:

- Highland dances (Highland Fling, Sword Dance, Seann Triubhas, and Reel),
- National dances (which include the Scottish Lilt and Flora McDonald's Fancy),
- Character dances (Specifically the Sailor's Hornpipe, and Irish Jig; although The Cakewalk used to be part of this category, it is no longer commonly danced).

Step dancing and clog dancing also used to regularly be part of some competitions.

Steps of each dance are now laid out in national and international syllabus such as the text books of the RSOBHD, United Kingdom Alliance Ltd (UKA), Scottish Dancing Teacher Association (SDTA), and British Association of Teachers of Dancing (BATD). Each dance comprises a number of steps, which may be numbered or worded. A RSOBHD four-step Highland fling may have the 1st step, 7th, 5th alternative, and finish with the 8th step; or by the step name: shedding, double shake and rock, second back-stepping, and last shedding.

=== Highland dances ===
The Highlander developed "as a necessary preparation for the management of the broad-sword ... used in certain dances to exhibit their dexterity"; this included dancing over two uncovered swords which are laid across each other on the floor, some while a dancer moves nimbly around them. Dextrously placing the feet by a peculiar step in the intervals between crossed blades, as in the Ghillie Callum, has long been linked with dances before a decisive battle or as a victory dance. Legend has it that on the eve of battle the highland chief would call out the clan's best dancers, who would dance the sword dance. If the dancers successfully avoided touching either blade, then it was considered an omen that the next day's battle would be in the clan's favour. A more practical explanation behind the meaning of this dance can be found in the training halls of older styles of fencing, where students of the sword developed their footwork by following geometric patterns of crosses, squares and triangles marked out on the floor.

In another version of Scottish sword dancing, the Highlander danced on a targe shield; this has similarities with an ancient Roman exercise in which the man standing on a shield had to defend himself and stay upright while others tried to pull it out from under him. Many of the Highland dances now lost to us were once performed with traditional weapons that included the Lochaber axe, broadsword, targe, dirk, and flail; the old Skye dancing song, Buailidh mi thu anns a' cheann (Scottish Gaelic for 'I will strike your head') indicate some form of weapon play to music; "breaking the head" was the winning blow in cudgelling matches throughout Britain, "for the moment that blood runs an inch anywhere above the eyebrow, the old gamester to whom it belongs is beaten, and has to stop".

The Highland dirk dance, in which the dancer flourishes the weapon, is often linked to the sword dance or dances called mac an fhorsair, (literally, 'the son of the forester'), the "broadsword exercise" or the bruicheath ('battle-dance'). They are mentioned in a number of sources, usually military, and may have been performed in a variety of different forms, practiced by two performers in a duelling form, or as a solo routine.

The tune of Gille Chaluim (anglicised as "Gillie Callum" and meaning 'Servant of Calum') has been claimed to date back to Malcolm III of Scotland (1031–1093), but this claim is certain to have been fabricated to provide false credentials for the antiquity of the dance which is unlikely to have been invented before 1800. According to one tradition, the crossed swords were supposedly placed on the ground before a battle while a soldier danced around the blades. If his feet knocked against the swords, he would be wounded in battle and if he kicked them, then he would die. This may derive from the folklore often surrounding warrior culture, but the style of the dance was changed by the Maclennan brothers of Fairburn.

One theory about the Highland fling is that it was a dance of triumph at the end of a battle. Another (no less romantic) theory is that it was performed before battles (like the sword dance), on top of the dancer's shield. The shield would have a spike in the middle, around which the dancer would do the dance that involves flicking of the feet, jumping and careful stepping supposedly to drive evil spirits away. The dancer is confined to one spot and snaps his fingers (which was reduced in recent times to merely holding the hands with the thumb touching the second joint of the middle finger, and the other three fingers extended in the air). Leaving aside the obvious difficulty of dancing around a sharpened spike on a shield, a much more plausible theory is that the Highland Fling is none other than a Foursome Reel with the progressive bits left out – at social gatherings, dancers would 'compete' by showing off the fancy solo steps they could perform, long before formal competitions at highland games had been invented.

Another story surrounding the Fling claims that it is meant to imitate a stag; the story goes that a boy who saw a stag was asked to describe it by his father. He lacked the words, so danced instead; the position of the hands resembles the head and antlers of a stag. This urban legend hides the fact that Highlanders used to snap their fingers as they danced.

Ruidhle Thulaichean (anglicised as 'reel of Tulloch') is supposed to have originated in the churchyard of Tullich, Aberdeenshire, where the congregation awaited the late minister. During the delay they whistled a highland tune and began to improvise a dance. A more gruesome version of the story is that the dance derives from a rough game of football that the inhabitants of Tulloch played with the severed head of an enemy; the Gaelic words to the tune bear this out.

The seann triubhas means 'old trousers' in Gaelic and is romantically associated with the repeal of the proscription of the kilt by the government after the failed Jacobite Uprising of 1745. However, the dance is considerably younger, with most of the steps performed today dating from the late 19th century.

Like other dance traditions, what is called "Highland dancing" is a hybrid form that has been constantly changing according to contemporary aesthetics and interpretations of the past. While some elements may be centuries old, other elements are much more modern. The vast majority of dances now performed were composed in the 20th century.

Highland dances are now supplemented at Highland games and dance competitions by what are known as national dances.

=== National dances ===
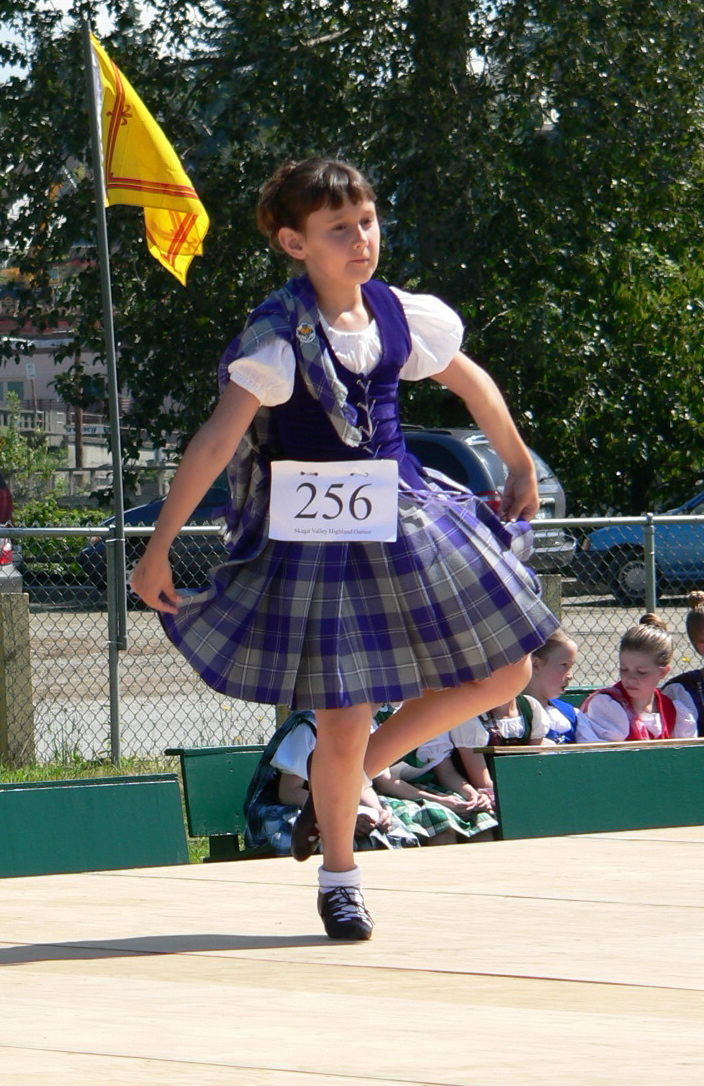
Scottish national dancing at the 2005 Skagit Valley Highland Games. The dancer is wearing the Aboyne dress for females.

At competitions, the national dances include the Scottish Lilt, Flora MacDonald's Fancy, the Earl of Errol, Blue Bonnets, Heilan' Laddie, the Barracks Johnnie, the Scotch Measure, and the Village Maid which illustrate the history of dancing and other aspects of Scottish culture and history. Some of the national dances were taught by dancing masters in the 19th century and show a balletic influence, while others derive from earlier traditions and were adapted to later tastes. The Earl of Errol, for example, is based on an 18th-century percussive hard-shoe footwork, although today's Highland dancers perform it in soft Ghillies. Some of the national dances were preserved and taught by dance masters such as D. G. MacLennan and Flora Buchan, while some were interpreted and reconstructed in the mid-20th century from notes written in Frederick Hill's 1841 manuscript.

=== Character dances ===
The sailor's hornpipe was adapted from an English dance, and is now performed more frequently in Scotland, while the Irish Jig is a humorous caricature of, and tribute to, Irish step dancing (the dancer, in a red and green costume, is an interpretation of an Irish person, gesturing angrily and frowning). If the Irish jig is danced by a woman or girl, it is about either the distressed wife scolding her husband, a woman being tormented by leprechauns, or a washerwoman chasing taunting boys (or children in general) away who have dirtied her washing – the showing of the woman's fist symbolises her wanting to beat up the children, the leprechauns, or the husband. If it is danced by a man or boy, it is the story of Paddy's leather breeches, in which a careless washerwoman has shrunk Paddy's fine leather breeches and he is waving his shillelagh at her in anger and showing his fist, intending to hit her.

The hornpipe mimics a sailor in Royal Navy doing work aboard ship: hauling rope, sliding on the rollicking deck, and getting his paycheck, and has quite a lot of detail involved that portrays the character (e.g. the dancer does not touch his palms, assumed to be dirty, on his uniform). Performed in a British sailor's uniform, its name derives from the accompanying instrument, the hornpipe. It is performed to tunes such as "Crossing the Minch" (Pipe Major Donald MacLeod) "Jackie Tar" (Traditional), and many other both contemporary and traditional tunes.

Perhaps one of the most unusual elements of character dance in modern Highland dance competitions was the inclusion of the cakewalk. In 2021, the RSOBHD ruled to remove the dance from competition on the basis that it was derogatory to persons of colour. The cakewalk is originally a dance performed by black slaves in the southern US imitating, in exaggerated style, the stately courtship ballroom dancing of slave owners. It was unique in competitive Highland dance as it is the only dance always performed as a duo and is the only dance that originated outside the British Isles. Also unique was the inclusion of fanciful and often outrageous costumes upon which some of the judging of artistry was based. While costume contests do occasionally take place regarding the outfits worn for the other dances, the outfits for those dances are so carefully prescribed (differences are restricted primarily to choice of tartan, colour of jackets or sashes, and choices such as lace sleeves and velvet vests instead of velvet jackets) that costume does not play a significant role in the dance competition or vary much across dancers. In contrast, while the cakewalk could be danced in traditional Scottish attire, dancers involved in the cakewalk often attempted to come up with the most creative duo costume they could, such as Frankenstein's monster and his bride, or Mickey and Minnie Mouse. The cakewalk was generally only danced at very large-scale competitions such as national or provincial championships, and was generally restricted to the top level of competitive dancers known as "premier" (formerly "open"). The cakewalk was generally performed to 'Whistling Rufus', written in 1899 by Kerry Mills. The inclusion of the cakewalk in competitive Highland Dance is credited to dancer, judge, and examiner James L. McKenzie who introduced the dance to Scotland from the United States.

=== Hebridean dances ===
The Hebridean dances originated in the Hebrides and are now danced by Highland dancers. It is unknown when these dances originated, or who created them, but dance master Ewen MacLachlan taught them in the Western Isles during the mid-19th century.

They are named: Aberdonian lassie, Blue Bonnets, Over the Water to Charlie, Tulloch gorm (or gorum), flowers of Edinburgh, Scotch measure (twa'some), and first of August. Many other dances from the Hebrides have been partially or fully lost. More relaxed than the other dances, they have also been more influenced by step-dancing.

=== List of dances ===
The following list is by no means exhaustive. Those marked with an asterisk ('*') are regularly observed at RSOBHD competitions.

Highland dances

- Pas de Basques *
- Pas de Basques and high cuts *
- Highland fling *
- The Marquis of Huntly's Highland fling
- Sword dance *
- Sword salute
- Argyll broadswords
- Lochaber broadswords
- Jacobite swords
- Seann triubhas *
- Hullachan *
- Strathspey and Highland reel *
- Strathspey and half Tulloch *
- Strathspey, Highland reel, and half Tulloch
- Threesome reel
- Tulloch gorm

National and (soft-shoe) step dances

- Blue bonnets over the border *
- Earl of Erroll (reel) *
- Flora MacDonald's fancy *
- Highland laddie (Hielan' laddie) *
- Scotch measure (twa some) *
- Scottish lilt *
- Village maid *
- Wilt thou go to the barracks, Johnny? *
- Tribute to J. L. McKenzie (Note: James L. McKenzie (1905–1992) was well-respected as a dancing teacher, and one of the founders of the RSOBHD. This dance is annually performed in Canada in recognition of his efforts. The RSOBHD text book contained staged photographs of McKenzie demonstrating the various movements. In later editions these were changed to line drawings based on the photographs. The eighth edition (2015) changed to line-drawings of a female dancer in kilt.)
- Aberdonian lassie
- Betty's jig
- Bobby Cuthbertson (Note: R. McNiven 'Bobby' Cuthbertson (1906–1979) was born in Glasgow and instrumental in the formation of SOHDA. A hornpipe tune is named in his honour and regularly used in that dance. ("Bobby Cuthbertson". The Traditional Tune Archive.))
- The bonnie briest knot
- Bonnie Dundee
- Dancer's Delight
- The Dusty Miller
- The first of August
- Flowers of Edinburgh
- Hebridean laddie
- The king of Sweden
- Lady Louisa MacDonald of Sleat
- Lassies of Kyle
- Linkumdodie
- Louden lassies
- Miss Forbes
- Mrs MacLeod of Raasay
- Over the isles to America
- Over the water to Charlie
- The Thistle
- Tribute to Charlie Mill (Note: Refers to Charlie Mill (1940–2004).)

Character dances

- Cakewalk
- Irish jig *
- Sailor's hornpipe *

== Dress ==
Each dancing association (RSOBHD, SOHDA, VSU, etc.) sets its own standard of dress, and various Highland games or other event may have its own rules. Items such as lipstick, earrings, tattoos, and the wearing of jewellery may be prohibited depending on the organisation.

The following is an indication of what is commonly observed. Attire has also changed over the decades. Ruffles around the neck and wrist-cuffs were once quite common. Early 20th-century photographs of dancers show a wide variety of dresses and skirts were once in use. Today, long-sleeved kilt jackets may give way to short-sleeved jackets depending on the climate. A dancer's skill level or sex may also determine the attire (under RSOBHD rules, premier-level dancers have more prescribed items than pre-premier dancers).

=== Highland dance attire ===
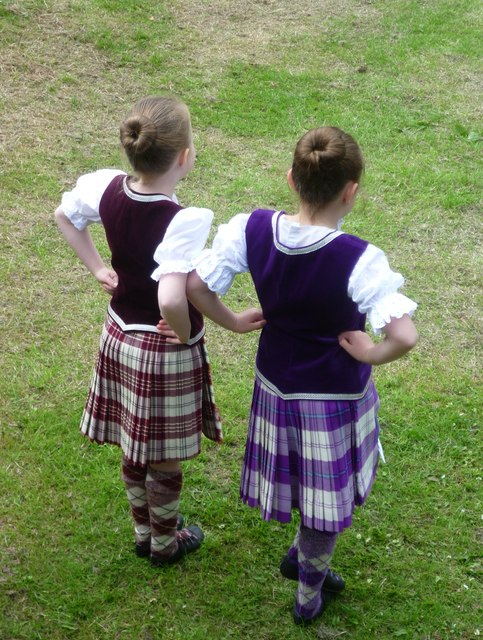
Girls dressed for Highland dancing

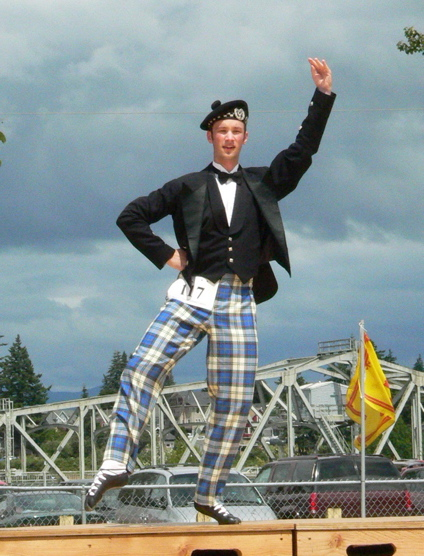
Laddie dancing in tartan trews

Soft-soled dance ghillies are worn by both sexes. These are quite distinct from harder-soled ghillie brogues, though they share the same lacing-up-the-ankle method. In Scotland most dancers tie their pumps around the arches of their feet instead. They are also very unlike hard-soled Irish dance shoes. The tartans used for dance-wear items, as described below, are today most often a dance or dress tartan that features white as a prominent colour.

Men wear a traditional Scottish bonnet (cap) in either the Balmoral or less often the Glengarry style, and a doublet of black or coloured velvet or cloth. If this jacket is in the Prince Charlie style, then it is to be accompanied by a shirt and bow tie with a waistcoat (vest), cummerbund, or belt. Doublets in the Montrose style are to be worn with a white lace jabot and, optionally, sleeve ruffles. A tartan kilt and hose (of a kilt-matching colour scheme, in tartan, argyle, or dicing) are worn; or tartan trews can be worn instead of a kilt for the seann truibhas and sometimes more generally. Whether a sporran is worn over the front of the kilts will depend upon the association or other rules-making body. A fly plaid (a narrow tartan shoulder cape of sorts) is usually no longer worn for male dancing.

Females wear a tartan kilt (without a sporran) with a velvet jacket, worn with a lace insert, or a similar but sleeveless velvet vest worn over a white blouse. The jacket or vest may be black or coloured, with a gold or silver braid and buttons down the front. Matching hose are also worn. Aboyne dresses have become more common in the recent years as general female dancewear (especially in North America), though this again varies by association or other rules-making body. The hair (if not very short already) is usually bound into a bun. Early-20th-century photographs also show that there was once a wider array of dress or skirt styles (sometimes fairly long), as well as use of the full plaid, decorative bonnets, and other accessories that are no longer typically in dance use.

The Royal Scottish Official Board of Highland Dancing which is the world governing body of highland dance, has a set dress code for all competitors dancing in sanctioned competitions.

=== National dance attire ===
Males wear the same dress for national dances as Highland dances, however tartan trews may be worn instead of a kilt.

Females may wear a white dress with a tartan plaid (shoulder shawl) with a brooch, pinned to the right shoulder and waist. Alternatively, they may wear the increasingly popular Aboyne dress, which consists of a velvet bodice joined to a knee-length tartan skirt (which differs from a kilt in being pleated all the way around, without a flat front); it is worn over a white blouse and white underskirts, and a matching tartan plaid is usually pinned at the right shoulder and hangs down the back. Depending on the rules-making body, skin-coloured tights or white socks may be permitted instead of coloured ones that match the tartan.

=== Sailor's hornpipe attire ===
Both sexes wear the same sailor outfit for this dance, in either navy blue or white. A v-neck jumper is worn over a square-necked white vest with bell-bottom trousers. A navy or light blue collar (with three stripes) and a sailor's regulation cap are also worn. There used to be horizontal creases in the trousers.

=== Irish jig attire ===
Irish jig shoes are black, green or red and, though they closely resemble ghillies, are hard-soled shoes with heels.

Males wear a Paddy hat, red or green muffler and tailcoat, brown or khaki breeches, and a waistcoat in a contrasting colour to that of the tailcoat. A shillelagh, a kind of Irish cudgel, is carried for twirling.

Females may wear one of several combinations of red, green and white blouses, dresses, skirts and cummerbunds. Dancers also wear white underskirts and a white apron. Often a clover is featured on the apron.

== See also ==
- Clog dancing
- Dirk dance
- Four Scottish Dances
- Highland dress
  - Aboyne dress
  - Ghillies (dance shoes)
- Highland games
- Irish dance
- Scottish country dance
- Scottish sword dances
- Step dancing
- Specific highland dances
  - Highland fling
  - Seann triubhas
