= Four Scottish Dances =

1957 composition by Malcolm Arnold

Four Scottish Dances (Op. 59) is an orchestral set of light music pieces composed by Malcolm Arnold in 1957 for the BBC Light Music Festival.

== The dances ==
Arnold's set, or suite, consists of four dances inspired by, although not based on, Scottish country folk tunes and dances. Although the individual dances are not titled, each is denoted by a separate tempo or style marking.

The composer's notations in the score, including his metronome indications (M.M.), are:

1. Pesante ( = 104)
2. Vivace ( = 160)
3. Allegretto ( = 96)
4. Con brio ( = 144)

While Arnold did not title the four pieces individually, his music publisher (Novello & Co) has provided notes, which are often employed by annotators for orchestral and concert programs. The first dance, Novello observes, is "in the style of a strathspey"; the second, a "lively reel." The song-like and graceful third dance evokes "a calm summer's day in the Hebrides"; while the last is "a lively fling."

The dances are collectively intended to evoke Scotland, and utilise timbres intended to imitate bagpipes, as well as musical devices such as reel and Scotch snap rhythms. The composer also employs comic elements, such as a "tipsy" middle section in the second dance, in which the ensemble abruptly slows from a lively vivace to meno mosso (quarter note = 112), whereupon a single bassoon plays a plodding solo marked by upward and downward slides, or glissandi, as well as staggering, syncopated rhythms. (Beethoven employs a solo bassoon for somewhat similar comic effect in the rustic third-movement scherzo — "Merry Gathering of Country Folk" — of his Pastoral Symphony.)

The first performance was given at the Royal Festival Hall on 8 June 1957 with the BBC Concert Orchestra conducted by the composer.

== Instrumentation ==
- Strings
  - Strings
  - Harp
- Woodwinds
  - One piccolo
  - One flute
  - Two clarinets in B♭
  - Two bassoons
- Brass
  - Four horns in F
  - Two trumpets in B♭
  - Three trombones
- Percussion
  - Timpani
  - Cymbals
  - Side drum
  - Bass drum
  - Woodblock
  - Tam-tam

== Arrangements ==
- for wind band by John Paynter, 1978
- for brass band by Ray Farr, 1984
- for wind quintet by Hugh Levey, 2022
- for piano by John York
- for piano and violin by David Gedge

== Selected commercial recordings ==
- 1959 Malcolm Arnold conducting the London Philharmonic Orchestra on Everest Records SDBR 3021 (re-released on Everest 9006).
- 1979 Malcolm Arnold conducting the London Philharmonic Orchestra on Lyrita LP and CD: SRCD.201
- 1996 Andrew Penny conducting the Queensland Symphony Orchestra on Naxos Records 8.553526 (Sir Malcolm Arnold: Dances)

=== John Paynter's wind band arrangement ===
- 1995 Jerry Junkin conducting the Dallas Wind Symphony on Reference Recordings RR-66CD (Arnold for Band)

== See also ==
- Dirk dance
- English Dances (Arnold)
- Highland dance
- List of Scottish country dances
- Scottish country dance
- Scottish sword dances
