= Strathdon =

Area in Aberdeenshire, Scotland

Coordinates: 57.19957°N 3.07574°W

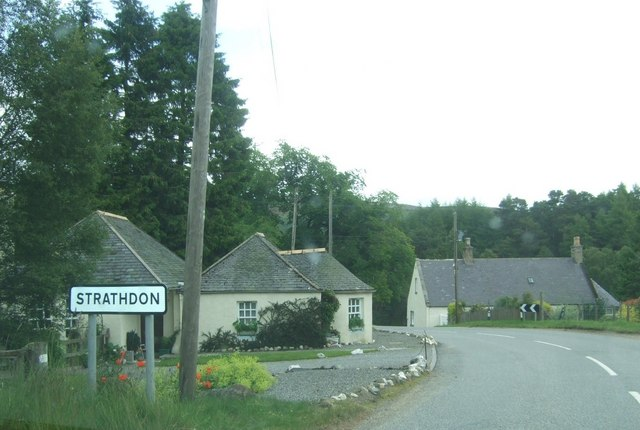
Strathdon

Strathdon (/stræθˈdɒn/; Gaelic: Srath Dheathain) is an area in Aberdeenshire, Scotland. It is situated in the strath of the River Don, 45 miles west of Aberdeen in the Highlands. The main village in the strath is Bellabeg, although it was originally called Invernochty due to its location at the confluence of the River Don and the Water of Nochty. Bellabeg has many of the local community's main facilities.

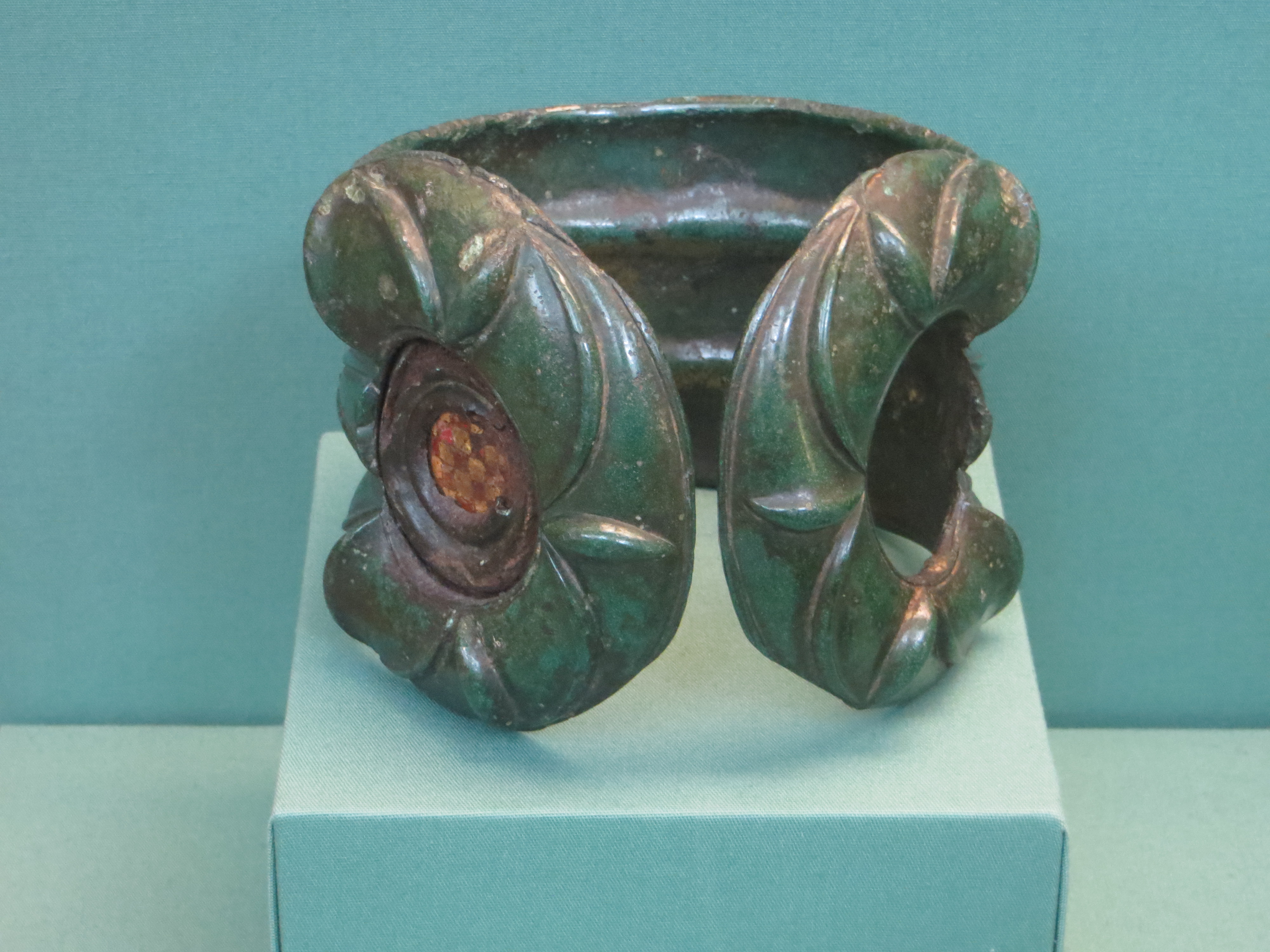
One of a pair of massive brass armlets found at Castle Newe near Strathdon and dating from 50 to 200 AD (British Museum)

Strathdon is an informal geographical area. This means that there are no precise boundaries in terms of where it begins or ends. It is the founding place of the Lonach Highland and Friendly Society, and the Lonach Highland Gathering. This is a traditional Highland Gathering with the heavy sport events such as tossing the caber, hammer etc., and it also hosts a competition of Highland dancing. Dances include the noted 'highland fling', 'sword dance', 'seann triubhas' and 'reel of Tulloch'.

Notable figures who have visited Strathdon include Sean Connery, Billy Connolly, Ewan McGregor and Queen Elizabeth II. Connolly owned Candacraig House between 1998 and 2013.

== See also ==
- Doune of Invernochty
