= Earl of Erroll (reel) =

Scottish highland dance

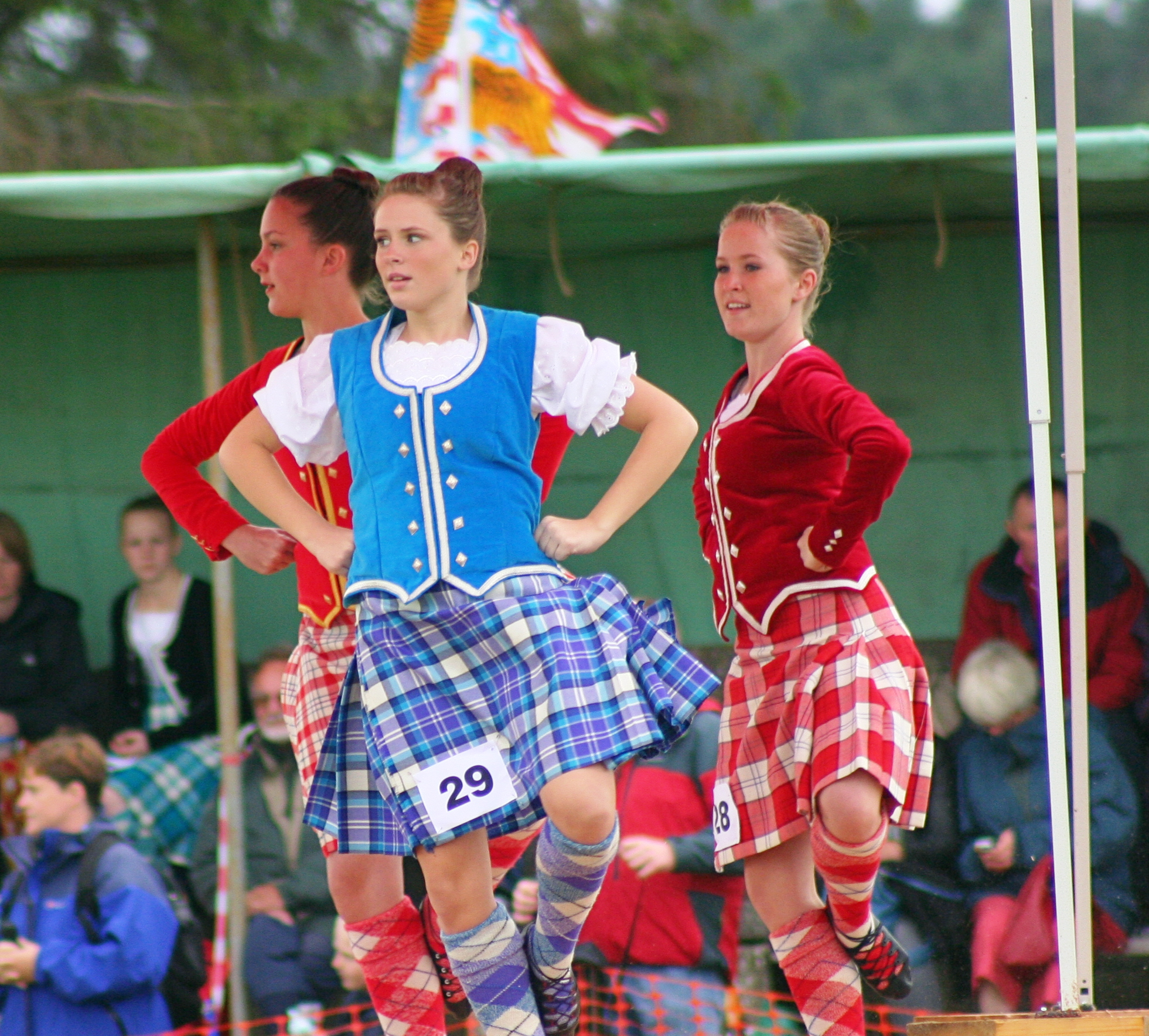
- Highland dancing, Dornoch
- Genre: Scottish highland dance
- Time signature: 4/4
- Origin: Scotland

The Earl of Erroll is a Scottish highland dance sometimes danced today at Highland games around the world, as part of Scottish National dances repertoire. It is danced to two slow reels (4/4), Earl of Erroll and the 23rd Countess of Erroll.

The dance takes its name from James Hay, 15th Earl of Erroll. It has been suggested that it was choreographed by Francis Peacock for the eponymous Earl because the Earl of Erroll was listed as one of the subscribers to Peacock's 1805 book Sketches Relative to the History and Theory but More Especially to the Practice of Dancing; however, no evidence linking a choreography of this name to Peacock's teaching legacy survives and no Earl of Erroll dance is described within that book. Peacock, also a musician, did dedicate a published collection of tunes, including one with the title The Earl of Erroll, to the Earl of Erroll.

The dance was likely originally performed in hard-soled dress shoes. The dance came back to the repertoire of Scottish dancers after it was published in 1953 by Mrs Isobel (Tibbie) Cramb, with reference to Frederick Hill's Manuscript (1841) and Miss Cruickshank of Aberdeen. It is still seen as a soft balletic Scottish step dance by RSCDS teachers The Earl of Erroll is considered one of the hardest national dances to perform well.

A Scottish country dance of a somewhat similar name, Earl of Errol's Reel, is performed in groups of 6 dancers (3-couple sets) as part of Scottish country dancing repertoire. The Earl of Errol's Reel is a jig, collected in Quebec, Canada, by Mary Isdal MacNab, who noted that the dance originated in France. It is a 6/8 jig, performed to a tune Mrs McMillan's Quadrille.
