= Dancer's Delight =

Scottish soft-shoe step dance

Dancer's Delight is a Scottish soft-shoe step dance devised in 1964 to commemorate the first anniversary of the United States Highland Dancers' Association. The dance is performed to 2/4 marches, e.g., Scotland the Brave. Dance instructions were published by Ron Wallace in 1994. Unlike softer Scottish ladies' step dances, e.g., The Thistle, Dancer's Delight resembles a Scottish highland dance in terms of style and technique.
