= Wilt thou go to the barracks, Johnny? =

Traditional Scottish highland dance

"Wilt thou go to the barracks, Johnny?" is a traditional Scottish Highland dance. It was interpreted and reconstructed from Frederick Hill's Book of Quadrilles and Country Dances, a manuscript written in 1841. It is usually performed wearing the Highland dance costume (kilt and waistcoat), sometimes in competitions as well as for medal testing and performance. It is can be danced to pipe marches such as "The Barren Rocks of Aden", "Braes of Mar", or "Scotland the Brave". Originally, the dance was probably danced to music with a similar name: "Go to Berwick Johnny", a song in 3/2 time.

Unlike most national dances, which are usually danced in an Aboyne dress if the dancer is female, "wilt thou go to the barracks, Johnny?" is danced in the standard kilt-based outfit. It is the second dance of the "national dance" subtype to be danced in this particular outfit, the other being "Highland laddie".

The dance recorded in the Hill Manuscript as "wilt thou go to the barricks Johnnie" is in 3/2 time. The dance performed today is a modern composition unrelated to the Hill version.
