= Highland (Irish) =

Irish musical form in duple meter

A highland is an Irish musical form in duple meter, largely idiomatic of County Donegal. Like the fling, it is related to the Scottish highland fling and the hornpipe, found throughout the British Isles. Like its Scottish cousin, a fling is played in cut time and has a dotted rhythm. Like the Scottish strathspey, quarter notes may sometimes be articulated as triplets or Scots snaps. However, unlike the strathspey, these Scots snaps are usually less sharply articulated. They are also played more slowly than reels and are strongly accented on the first beat, which tends to be a note quarter note in length. A typical fling has a 32-bar form divided into two parts, each consisting of eight bars which are repeated: AABB.

- A transcription of the Jimmy Lyon's Highland

== See also ==
- Highland fling
- Strathspey
- Schottische
