= Fling (Irish) =

Irish musical form

A fling is an Irish musical form in duple meter. Like the highland, it is related to the Scottish highland fling and the hornpipe, found throughout the British Isles. Like its Scottish cousin, a fling is played in cut time and has a dotted rhythm. A typical fling has a 16-bar form divided into two parts, each consisting of four bars which are repeated: AABB.

- A transcription of Mary Brennan's Favourite fling

== See also ==
- Highland fling
