= Ghillies (dance shoes) =

Soft shoe for Irish and Scottish dancing

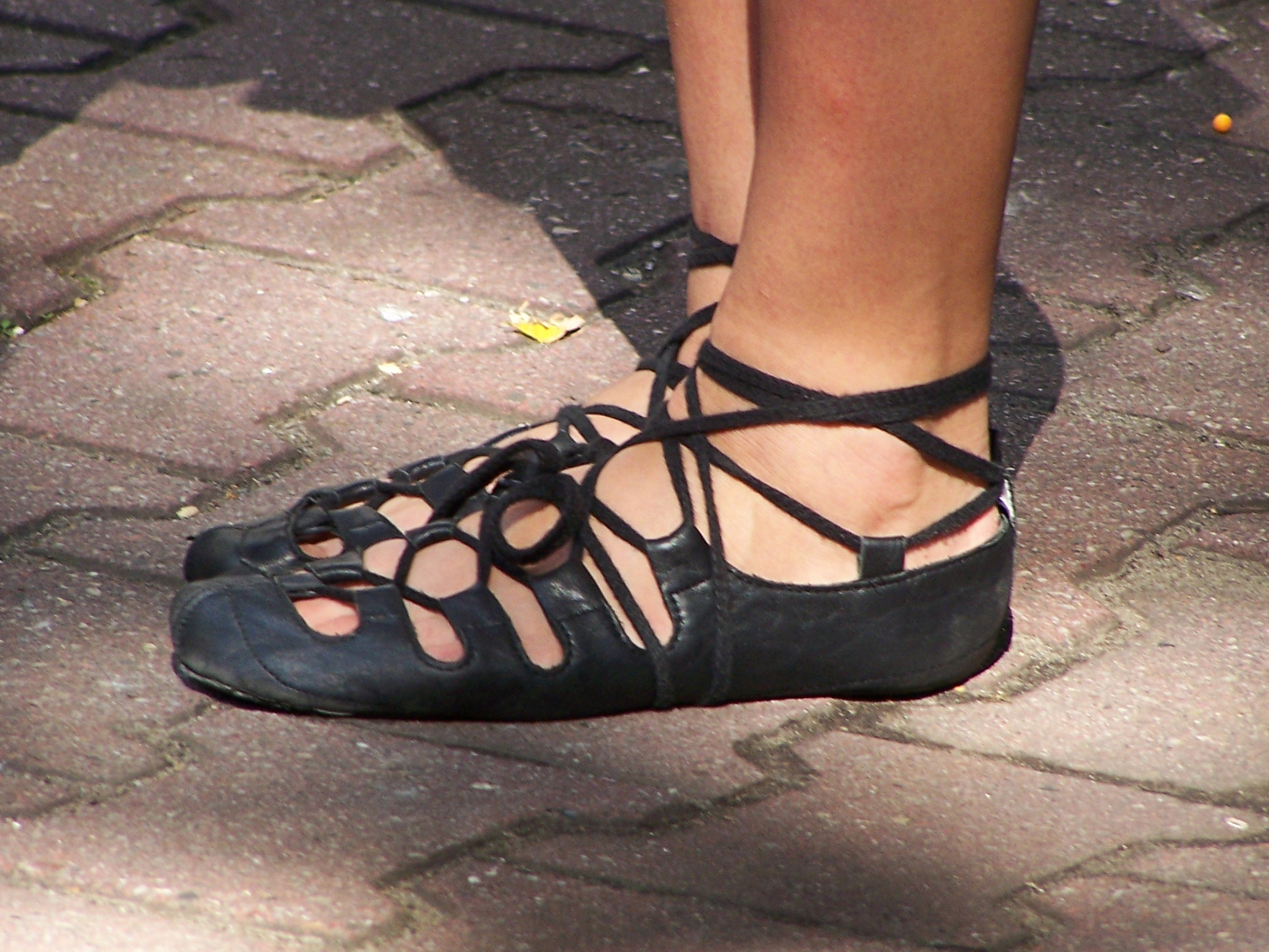
Irish ghillies

Irish dance ghillies

Ghillies are specially designed shoes used for several types of dance. They are soft shoes, similar to ballet shoes. They are used by women in Irish dance, by men and women in Scottish country dance, and by men and women in Scottish highland dance.

Ghillies are also sometimes known by a variety of other names that include: light shoes, pomps, pumps, and soft shoes.

== Appearance and materials ==
Ghillies are soft shoes, almost always made of a supple leather that forms to the foot. They use laces which criss-cross the top of the foot and are tied together similar to a sneaker. Most dancers use laces (required in competitions), although some ghillies do utilize elastic. Some dancers will also wrap the laces/elastics around the soles of the feet. The soles usually stretch across the entire bottom of the shoe (full-soled) and are made from leather. Some ghillies, however, are split-soled, with a leather sole under the heel and under the ball of the foot. Ghillies are most commonly black, although other colours (including red, green, and white) are manufactured. White ghillies can be dyed a variety of colours, such as blue, red, pink and others, to be used with costumes for specially choreographed dances.

== Scottish ghillies ==
Scottish ghillies are used by men and women for Highland dancing and for Scottish country dancing. They are almost always black, although they often feature coloured stitching and eyelets. Highland ghillies, for Highland dances, generally need to fit snugly but also need to be able to get on the foot around thick socks or hose; for National dances, they fit snugly as they are worn with thin socks or stockings. They are generally worn very tight in order to get a good point.

== Irish ghillies ==
Irish ghillies are used by women in Irish dancing, whereas men wear reel shoes. Unlike Scottish ghillies, the Irish version rarely feature coloured stitching, and they use loops in the leather, as opposed to eyelets, for the laces. Irish ghillies are available in a solid tan leather sole and a split sole.

== Comparison with ballet shoes ==
Like ballet shoes, ghillies are generally made from leather, and have similar soles. Many dancers who start in Highland or Irish dancing will first use ballet shoes, as the cost is considerably lower. The most easily recognizable difference between ballet shoes and ghillies is that ghillies use laces to fasten them to the foot, whereas ballet shoes generally use an elastic across the ankle. Also the laces are very long, and are wrapped around the ankle and foot before tied. Other differences are that ghillies do not have a string/elastic around the edge of the shoe to tighten them, and the soles of ghillies are not usually stitched on, but glued on.

== Other uses ==
- Ghillies, or ghillie brogues, are also a type of shoe with laces along the instep and no tongue, especially those used for Scottish country dancing. Although now worn for dancing and social events, ghillies originated as a shoe that would dry quickly due to the lack of a tongue, and not get stuck in the mud because of their laces above the ankle.
- In a perhaps more recent and certainly competing shoe-related use, Ghillie has also been used to describe laced shoes where rings or loops that project over the tongue are attached to the upper as an alternative to the use of eyelets punctured in the upper; this style is often seen on athletic shoes.
- Ghillies can also be used for other forms of dance, such as lyrical.

== See also ==
- List of shoe styles
