= Seann triubhas =

Type of Scottish folk dance

The seann triubhas (pronounced [ʃãũn̪ˠ ˈt̪ɾu.əs̪], approximately shown-TROOSS) is a Highland dance, and is usually done in kilt. Its name is a Scottish Gaelic phrase which means 'old trousers'.

== Origins ==
There has been a widely accepted story that the kicking or sweeping movements of the legs in the first step represented the attempt of the dancer to shake off the "despicable" trews, but D. G. MacLennan wrote in Traditional Highland and Scottish Dances that "this first step has nothing to do with the idea of kicking off the trews, but ... is new to the dance and was composed by myself". The seann triubhas, then, is simply about a pair of old trews which may or may not have been a subject of distaste or fun to the wearer, and may or may not have something to do with the Jacobite Rebellion of 1745.

Catriona Scott explains that in personal correspondence with Christina Morrison, a highland dancer, that '[T]he steps are meant to represent the advantages of the kilt, particularly in the whirling and birling steps. I remember we used to do a sort of pirouette step but I don't think it is done now'.

Martin Martin described trews as common men's wear throughout the Hebrides in his 1703 Description of the Western Islands of Scotland. Tartan trews were part of the Highland wardrobe for chieftains and gentlemen whilst on horseback (the large Highland ponies) from the early 17th century onward. Some Seann Triubhas steps seem to have originated from hard shoe dancing, and the dance was taught to be performed in regular shoes with heels by dancing masters in the 19th century. In her Memoirs of a Highland Lady, Elizabeth Grant recounted that in 1805 she "danced my Shean Trews ... in a new pair of yellow (!) slippers bought at Perth".

== Tunes ==
In the late 18th century, the dance was performed to a fiddle tune called "Seann Triubhas Uilleachan" (Scottish Gaelic for 'Willie's Old Trousers'), previously and more scurrilously called "The De'il Stick the Minister". When the dance began to be incorporated into Highland Dance competitions, which were usually played for by pipers, the tune was changed to "Whistle O'er the Lave o't", which could be played on the bagpipe and is the tune commonly used for the dance today.

== Dancing ==
A version of a seann triubhas in a percussive dance style was remembered and danced by Margaret Gillis in Cape Breton Island, Nova Scotia, and those steps were written down in 1957 by Frank Rhodes. These steps were to be danced to the tune "Whistle O'er the Lave o't", though the same steps were said to be danced to the "Irish Washerwoman" jig on St. Patrick's Night. An anonymous manuscript dating to 1826 describes both Irish and Scottish seann triubhas (spelled Shauntreuse in the manuscript) steps, but tunes for these dances are not specified.

In contemporary competitive Highland dance, after dancing three to four steps, the dancer will clap, which signals the piper to speed up the music. The final, or 'Quick Time' steps look similar to the Highland Fling, and Quick Time steps currently described in the Royal Scottish Official Board of Highland Dancing (RSOBHD) textbook are steps that used to be danced in the Fling. Other steps have been published by G. Douglas Taylor, William Cameron, D. G. MacLennan, and Joan & Tom Flett.

The seann triubhas is now danced at most highland dance competitions around the world. Dancers usually start dancing it in the beginner category at competitions, and continue to dance it up to premier level. This dance is also common in most highland and theory exams. Dancers wear the standard kilt outfit to perform this dance, though it historically had been performed in tartan trews as well.

=== Steps ===
This dance is usually done with either:

- 4 steps (3 slow steps and 1 quick step) – "3 & 1";
- 6 steps (4 slow steps and 2 quick steps) – "4 & 2".

The first step must always be done to start the dance, but the rest of the steps are up to the dancer to choose. At the higher levels the SOBHD will release a different order of steps for each year to be danced in championship competitions. Dancers taking theory exams may also need to know all of these steps, as well as their order, depending on the level of their exam.

Music: Whistle ower the Lave o't'

Slow steps tempo – 94–104 beats per minute
First step: brushing
First step alternative Second step: side travel
Third step: diagonal travel
Third alternative Fourth step: backward travel
Fourth alternative Fifth step: travelling balance
Alternative method of counting Sixth step: leap and highcut
Seventh step: entrechat and highcut Eighth step: leap and shedding Ninth step: leap and entrechat Tenth step: highcut in front and balance
Alternative tenth step Eleventh Step: side heel-and-toe
Twelfth Step: double highcutting

Quick steps tempo – 112–124 beats per minute
Thirteenth step: shedding with back-step
Fourteenth step: toe-and-heel and rock
Fifteenth step: pointing and back-stepping
Sixteenth step: heel-and-toe and shedding
Seventeenth step: heel-and-toe, shedding, and back-stepping
Eighteenth step: back-stepping

Finish method 1: one leap
Finish method 2: two leaps
Finish method 3: two Highland fling turns

Entrechat endings:
Method 1: one entrechat
Method 2: two entrechats
Method 3: leap then entrechat
Method 4: entrechat then leap
Method 5: leap, entrechat, leap
Method 6: leap, entrechat, leap, entrechat

== See also ==
- Highland dance
- Highland Fling
