= Pas de basque =

In Highland dance, a pas de basque is described as follows: prepare with an extension of the working foot to second aerial position low. Spring to that side, bringing the new working foot into third or fifth position on the half point. Beat, without exaggeration, the ball of the other foot in third or fifth rear, sharply extending the front foot if required to begin the next movement.

In the Primary level, 16 of these are performed and it is considered a dance, so this is one of the first movements a Highland dancer learns. As well as Highland dance, the pas de basque is also a recognised step in ballet.
