= Dirk dance =

Dirk Dance
- Also known as: Scottish Knife Fighting, Highland Knife Fighting, Dirk Fighting, Dirk Fencing
- Focus: Knife Fighting
- Country of origin: United Kingdom; Scotland
- Parenthood: Historical
- Olympic sport: No

A dirk dance is a Scottish dance performed while brandishing a dirk. It is a solo dance but can be performed by two or more people dancing in unison. The dance is quite different in style from the better known Highland dances and in many ways imitates the use of a dirk in fighting. Research suggests that the dance may, in fact, have originated as a series of moves for training in the use of the dirk. There are records showing that a Dirk Dance was included in Highland Dance competitions in 1841.

The dance was recorded by J. F. and T. M. Flett in their book, Traditional Step-Dancing in Scotland, after they learned it from Mary Isdale Mac Nab of Vancouver. She in turn had learned the dance in the 1900s from Scottish piping and dance champion, D.C. Mather. Another tradition of dirk dance, now lost, involved two dancers. In this dance, one is "killed" with the dirk, but then resurrected by his/her sorrowful partner. A dirk dance from the Isle of Man was also recovered by Manx folk researcher, Mona Douglas. In this version, the dancer wields a dagger.

Highland dance was also performed with other weapons including the Lochaber axe, the broadsword, flail, and paired targe and dirk. The Highland Dirk Dance resembles a combative dance similar to those of Indonesian Pentjak Silat, which has the performer executing knife techniques combined with wrestling style kicks, trips and sweeps. One version of the dance involved attacking and defensive techniques with single-sticks and targe shields and was last performed in Britain in 1850 by two brothers named MacLennan, one of whom was a colleague of Mr Mather.

== See also ==
- Four Scottish Dances
- Scottish country dance
- Sword dance
- Scottish Martial Arts
- Scottish Wrestling
- Historical fencing in Scotland
