= Lonach Highlanders =

Cultural preservation society members

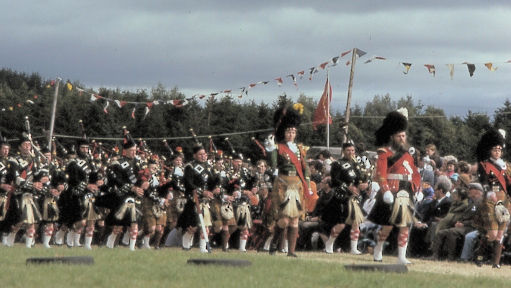
The Lonach Highlanders marching at the 1978 Highland Games

The Lonach Highlanders are members of the Lonach Highland and Friendly Society, made up of men from the Strathdon area of Aberdeenshire in Scotland. The society was formed in 1823. The principal aims of the Society are the preservation of Highland dress and the Gaelic language; to support loyal, peaceable manly conduct and the promotion of social and benevolent feelings among the inhabitants of this district. However, the Strathdon (and Aberdeenshire) dialect of Gaelic has become extinct since their formation so it is arguable how successful they have been in that aim.

It was further agreed to open a fund for distressed members and their families. Unlike the Atholl Highlanders, the Lonach Highlanders have never been presented with colours, and are not considered a military unit. However they do carry the society colour and two banners ensigned "LONACH".

The Highlanders parade annually during the annual Lonach Highland Games and Gathering, held on the 4th Saturday of August, to officially open the games. At various points along the route from Bellabeg to Strathdon, the column stops for a "wee dram" (of Scotch whisky). This is led by the patron of the Lonach Highland and Friendly Society, part of the Forbes clan. Most of the men in Lonach are Forbes, although there is a section for the Wallace and Gordon clans as well, each with their own tartan.

The current patron of the Lonach Highlanders is Sir James Forbes.

The Lonach Highlanders are led by the Lonach pipe band at the Lonach Gathering every year, as well as other society occasions and visits abroad, such as in 1996 when they visited Hungary.

On the 150th anniversary of Lonach a new colour and banners were presented at the Lonach Gathering. The following week the pipe band and Highlanders marched over the hills to Braemar to present the new colours to Queen Elizabeth II at the Braemar Gathering. The Highlanders set up camp at Braemar Castle re-enacting an occasion that last happened during the reign of Queen Victoria.
