= Fling (social network) =

Social media service

- Website type: Social media
- Available in: 112 languages
- Founded: March 2014 in London
- Area served: Worldwide
- Founder: Marco Nardone
- CEO: Marco Nardone
- Users: 4 million
- Launched: July 2014
- Current status: Inactive

Fling was a social media app available for IOS and Android. It was founded in 2014 by Marco Nardone and was taken offline in August 2016.

== Overview ==
In 2012, Marco Nardone founded the startup Unii and launched Unii.com, a social network intended for students in the UK. While working on this service, Nardone had the idea for a messaging service where pictures could be sent to strangers in January 2014. The app Fling was then developed and released between March and July 2014. After a month, it already had 375,000 downloads and 180,000 active users on iOS.

Users were able to take pictures inside the app and send them to 50 random people all over the world. The recipient could then choose to answer via chat or reply by sending a picture themselves.

The app was used by many users as a medium to exchange sexually explicit pictures and for sexting with strangers. This led to the app being removed from the App Store in June 2015.

In the 19 days that followed, flings developers rewrote the App almost completely from scratch, working around the clock. The feature to message random strangers was removed, and the app was readmitted into the App Store as a messenger App resembling Snapchat.

But the redesigned Application did not have the success of its predecessor. The funding ran out and the parent company Unii went bankrupt. The company was not able to pay their content moderation team anymore, leading to a new surge of pornographic content on the App.

Shortly after that, the Social Network was taken offline in August 2016. It has been inactive since.

During the 2 years Fling was online, $21 million was raised from investors while generating no revenue at all. Of this $21 million (£16.5m), £5 million came from Nardone's father.

== Allegations against CEO ==
Former employees made multiple allegations against Marco Nardone, the Founder and CEO of Unii and Fling. According to these claims, he behaved erratic and abusive, throwing "things across the office".

He hired his girlfriend as the head of human resources to handle issues between him and his staff. Employees who left the company often had "some part of their pay held back".

According to the reports, he also spent the money raised from investors irresponsibly, having no clear concept of a budget. Some of that money was used on expensive restaurants in London, a luxurious office for CEO Nardone and advertisements for Fling on Twitter and Facebook.

Nardone also spent time partying in Ibiza with two employees, while the developer team in London frantically tried to get Fling back online after it being removed from the App Store.

In December 2017 he pleaded guilty to assaulting his girlfriend at a domestic violence court.
