= Flying =

Flying may refer to:

- Flight, the process of flying
- Aviation, the creation and operation of aircraft

== Music ==
=== Albums ===
- Flying (Cody Fry album), 2017
- Flying (Grammatrain album), 1997
- Flying (Jonathan Fagerlund album), 2008
- UFO 2: Flying (UFO album), 1971
- Flying, by Bae Seul-ki
- Flying, by Chas & Dave
- Flying, by The Hometown Band

=== Songs ===
- "Flying" (Beatles instrumental), 1967
- "Flying" (Bryan Adams song), 2004
- "Flying" (Cast song), 1996
- "Flying" (Chas & Dave song), 1982
- "Flying", by Anathema from A Natural Disaster, 2003
- "Flying", by Badfinger from Straight Up, 1971
- "Flying", by Cory Marks from the 2022 extended play I Rise
- "Flying", by James Newton Howard from the 2003 film Peter Pan
- "Flying", by Living Colour from Collideøscope, 2003
- "Flying", by Moka Only from Sex Money Moka, 2014
- "Flying", by Stan Rogers from From Fresh Water, 1984
- "Flyin'", by Prism from See Forever Eyes, 1978

== Other uses ==
- Flying (magazine), a monthly publication
- Flying (film), a 1986 drama film
- "Flying" (Bagpuss), a 1974 children's television episode
- "Flying" (The Good Place), an episode of the American comedy television series
- Flying, a 1974 book by Kate Millett

== See also ==
- Fly (disambiguation)
- Flying and gliding animals
