= Scottish sword dances =

Dancing around two crossed swords

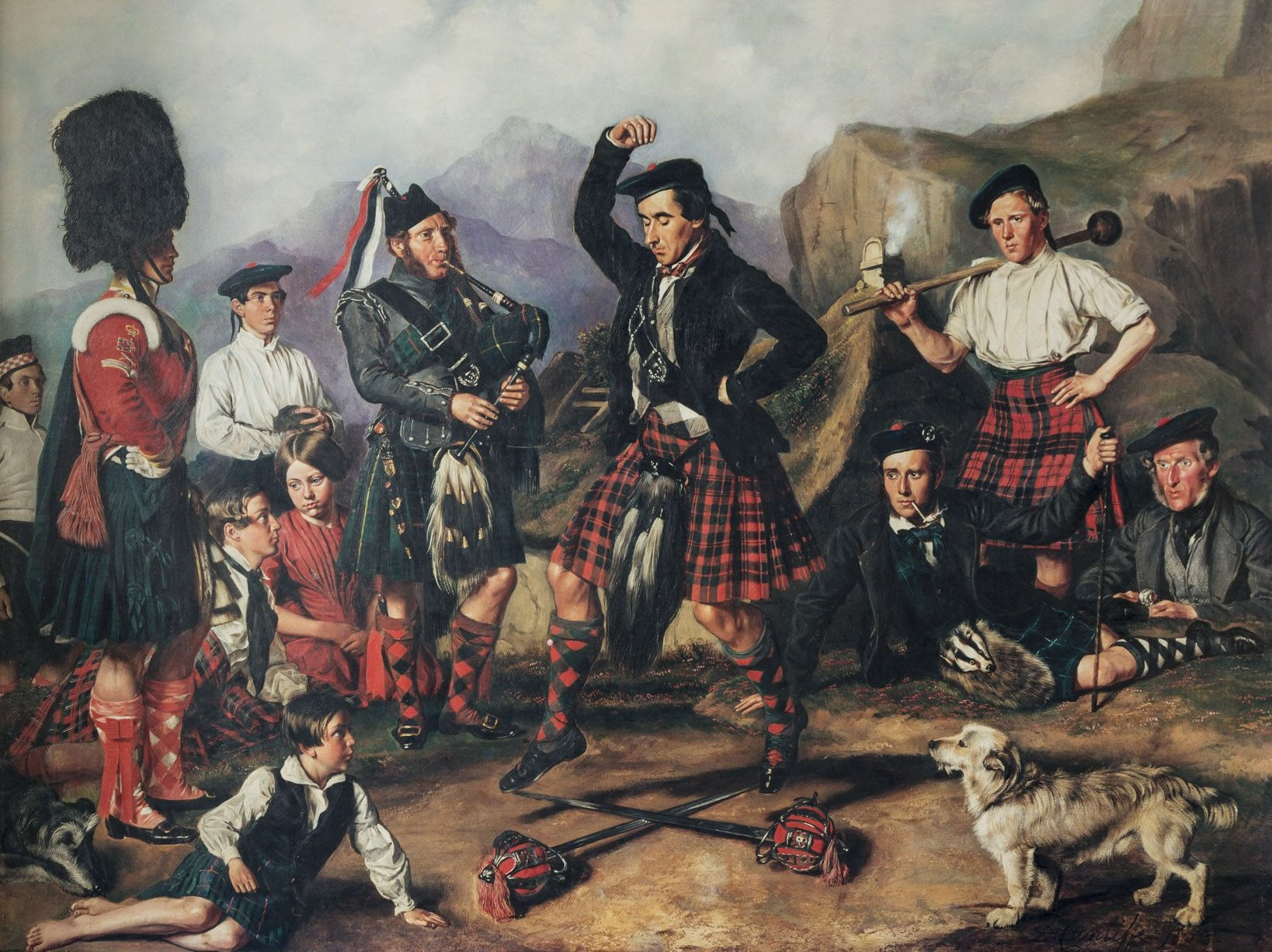
The Sword Dance by David Cunliffe, 1853, depicting men of the 42nd Regiment of Foot (Black Watch) and 93rd (Sutherland Highlanders)

The Sword dance is one of the best known of all Highland dances, an ancient dance of war. Performance of sword dances in the folklore of Scotland is recorded from as early as the 15th century.

Related customs are found in the Welsh and English Morris dance, in Austria, Germany, Flanders, France, Italy, Spain, Portugal and Romania.

- In Ghillie Callum or "Scottish sword dance" the dancer crosses two swords on the ground in an "X" or a "+" shape, and dances around and within the 4 quarters of it.
- The dirk dance involves either one or two dancers, each holding a single dirk.

== History of the Scottish sword dance ==
=== Origins ===
Gillidh Callum was a figure in Scottish apocryphal folk belief, said to be Noah's bagpiper. According to these beliefs, Noah, upon first drinking fermented wine, crossed two vines and danced above them while Gillidh Callum played the bagpipes, thus inventing the ancestor of the Highland sword dance (gillie callum).

There are many theories surrounding the origins and backstory of the Scottish Sword Dance (Gille Chaluim). One theory is that King Malcolm III killed a rival chieftain and proceeded to celebrate the victory by dancing over both men's swords. Another theory is that Gille Chaluim would be danced prior to battle and if the dancer's foot touched a sword, it was a sign of bad luck and the men would lose the battle.

=== Traditions ===
As a part of the traditional Scottish intangible heritage, the performance of the Sword Dance has been recorded as early as the 15th century. It is normally recognised as the war dance with some ceremonial sense in the Scottish Royal court during that period. The old kings and clan chiefs organised the Highland Games as a method to choose their best men at arms, and the discipline required to perform the Highland dances allowed men to demonstrate their strength, stamina, and agility. The earliest reference also mentioned that the dance is often accompanied with the music of bagpipes. The basic rule requires the dancer to cross two swords on the ground in an "X" or "+" shape and to dance around and within the 4 quarters of it.

The earliest reference to these dances in Scotland is mentioned in the Scotichronicon, compiled in Scotland by Walter Bower in the 1440s. The passage is in Lib. X, Cap. XL (Book 10, Chapter 40), and regards Alexander III and his second marriage to the French lady Yolande de Dreux at Jedburgh in Roxburghshire on 14 October 1285.

At the head of this procession were the skilled musicians with many sorts of pipe music including the wailing music of bagpipes, and behind them others splendidly performing a war-dance with intricate weaving in and out. Bringing up the rear was a figure regarding whom it was difficult to decide whether it was a man or an apparition. It seemed to glide like a ghost rather than walk on feet. When it looked as if he would disappear from everyone's sight, the whole frenzied procession halted, the song died away, the music faded, and the dancing contingent froze suddenly and unexpectedly.

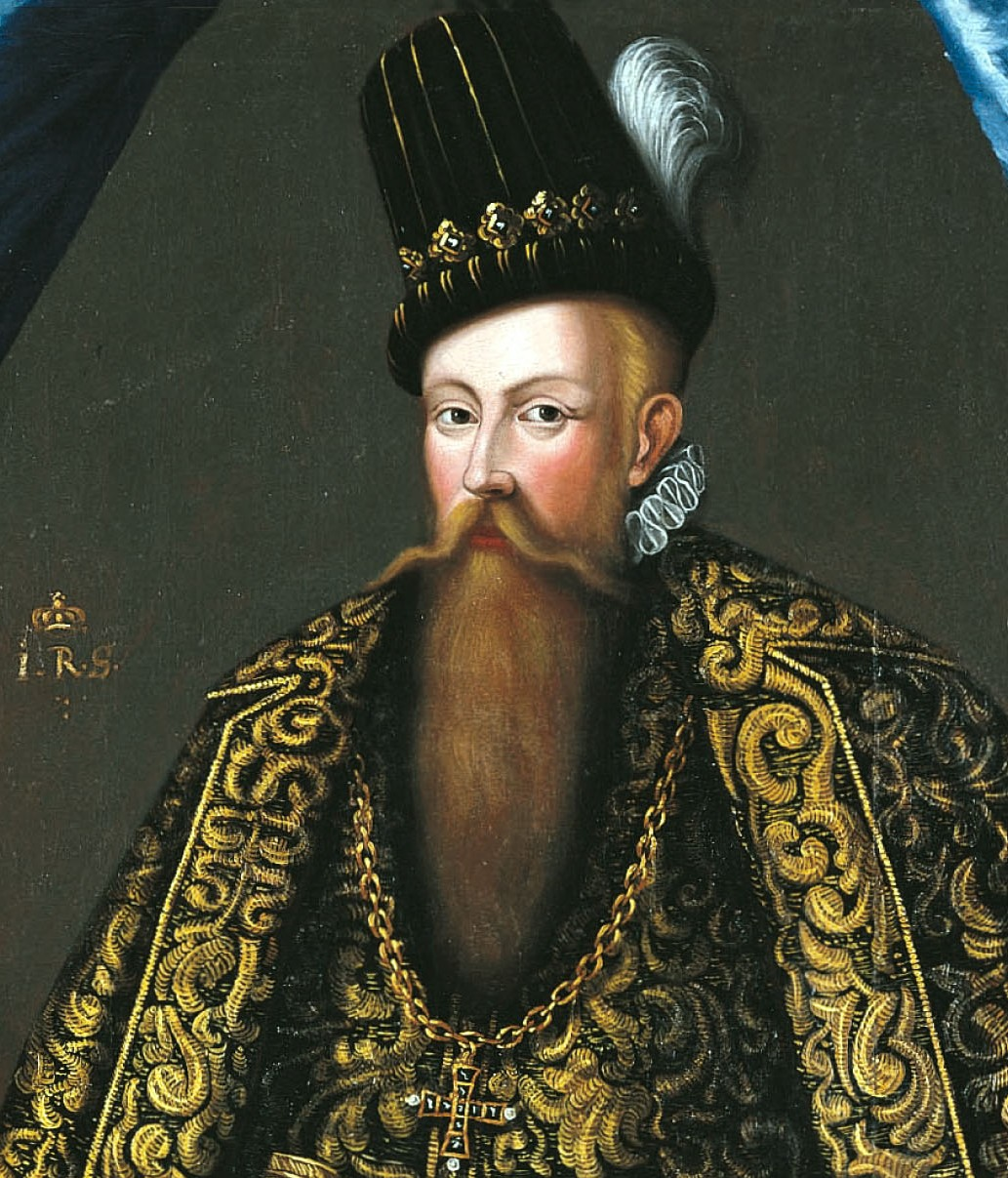
Swedish King John III

When Mary, Queen of Scots married the dauphin, celebrations in Edinburgh on 3 July 1558 included a sword dance performed by dancers in costume adorned with bells. In 1573, Scottish mercenaries are said to have performed a Scottish Sword dance before the Swedish King, John III, at a banquet held in Stockholm Castle. The dance, "a natural feature of the festivities," was used as part of a plot to assassinate the King (the Mornay Plot), where the conspirators were able to bare their weapons without arousing suspicion. Fortunately for the King, at the decisive moment the agreed signal was never given.

A sword dance and Scottish highland dances were included at the reception for Anne of Denmark at Edinburgh in May 1590. Seventeen sword dancers wore bells and newly made suites or "stands" of Highland clothes. Scottish courtiers performed a sword dance for Anne of Denmark and Beaumont, the French ambassador, at Hampton Court on 6 January 1604. Their dance was compared to a Spanish matachin. A mixture of sword dance and acrobatics were performed before James VI in 1617 and again for Charles I in 1633, by the Incorporation of Skinners and Glovers of Perth. The 1633 performance was described in the Glover's register:

His Majesty’s chair being set upon the wall next to the Water of Tay whereupon was a floating stage of timber clad about with birks, upon the which for His Majesty’s welcome and entry thirteen of our brethren of this calling of Glovers with green caps, silver strings, red ribbons, white shoes and bells upon their legs, shearing rapiers in their hands and all other abulzements, danced our sword dance with many difficult knots and allapallajesse, five being under and five above upon their shoulders, three of them dancing through their feet and about them, drinking wine and breaking glasses. Which (God be praised) was acted and done without hurt or skaith to any.

== Types of sword dance ==
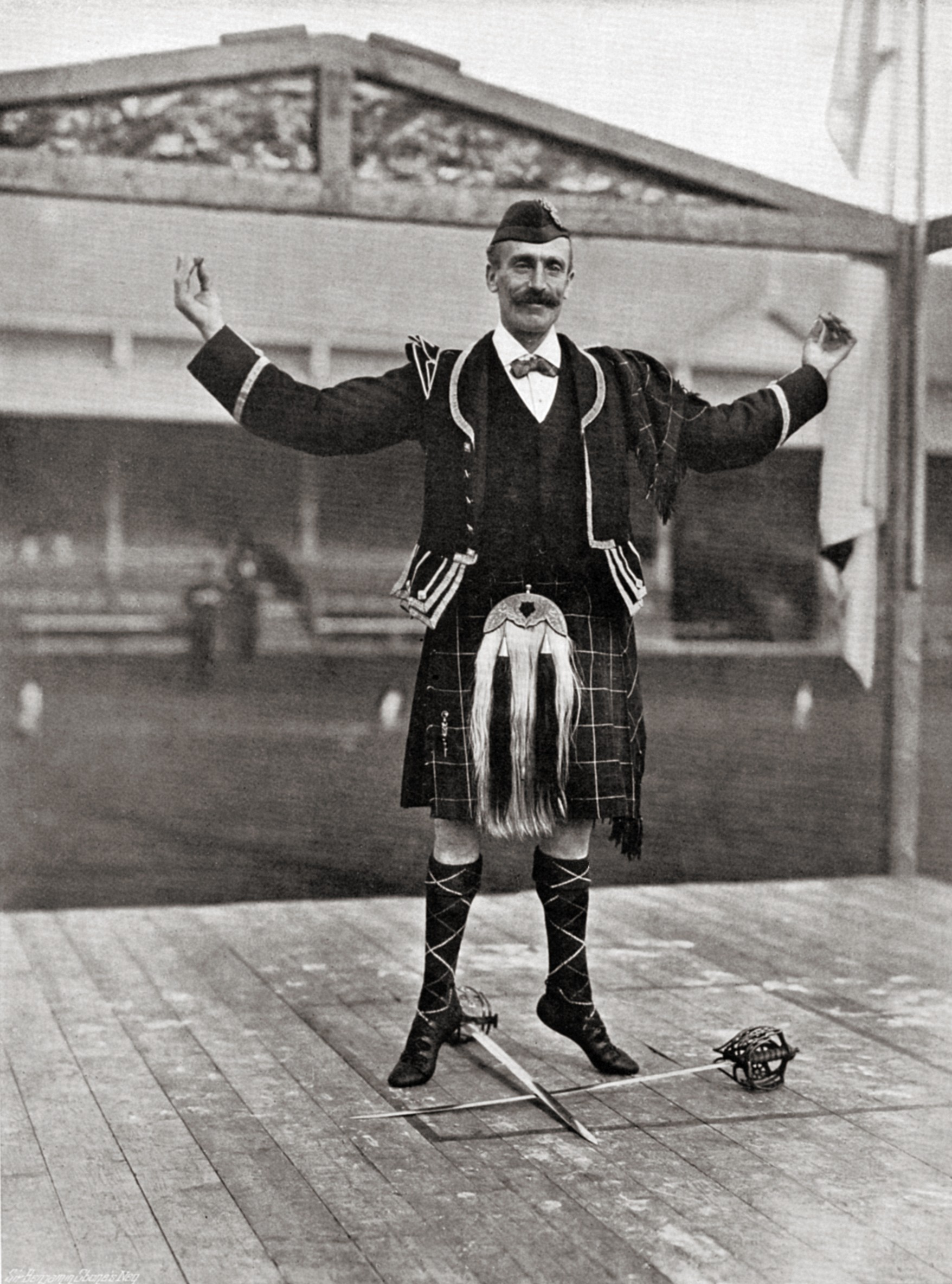
A performer of the Scottish sword dance, the "Gillie Callum", in Inverness, c. 1900

Many of the Highland dances now lost were once performed with traditional weapons that included the Lochaber axe, the broadsword, a combination of targe and dirk, and the flail.

The old Skye dancing song Buailidh mi thu anns a' cheann, "I will break your head", may indicate some form of weapon play to music. 'Breaking the head' was the winning blow in cudgelling matches throughout Britain, "for the moment that blood runs an inch anywhere above the eyebrow, the old gamester to whom it belongs is beaten, and has to stop."

C. N. McIntyre North describes a clockwise-moving Sword Dance in his 1880 "Book of the Club of True Highlanders". McIntyre North describes nine steps. The first step beats the rhythm in time with the tune "Gillie Calliun" [sic].

A combative sword dance called the Highland Dirk Dance still exists and is often linked to the sword dance or dances called "Macinorsair" (Mac an Fhòrsair), the "Broad Sword Exercise" or the "Bruicheath" (Battle Dance). These dances are mentioned in a number of sources, and may have been performed in a variety of different forms, by two performers in a duelling form and as a solo routine.

== Tradition in Highland Regiments ==
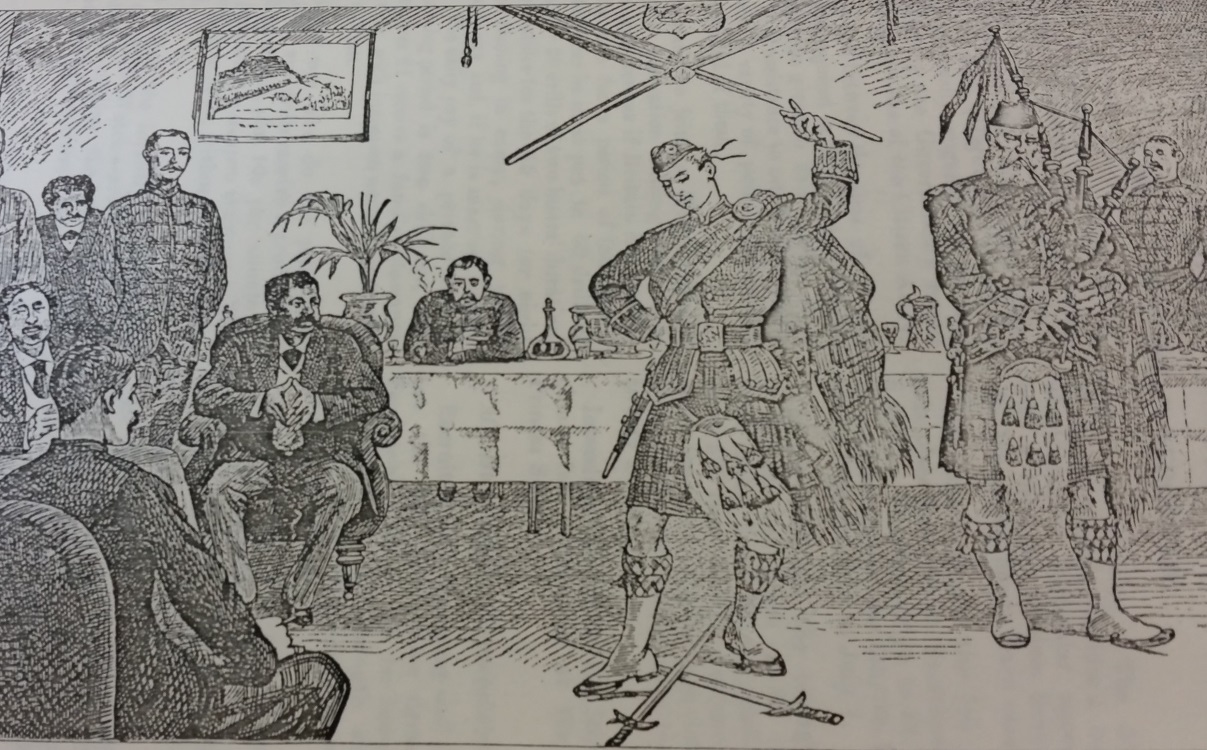
The Malagasy Envoys at Cape Town—Entertainment at the Officers' Mess of the 1st Argyll and Sutherland Highlanders

Highland Regiments have preserved the traditional dance, albeit with some changes. To prepare for the Sword Dance, a soldier arranges two crossed swords. Then to the sound of bagpipes he dances a choreographed series of steps and movements between and around the swords, keeping his back straight, arms raised, and hands posed in a certain way. The dance can be performed by more than one individual, and there is a long tradition of exhibition and competitive dancing with additional crossed swords and dancers. Over time, this style of dance became an integral part of the performance of bagpipe bands.

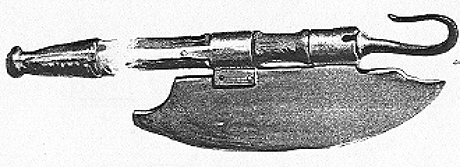
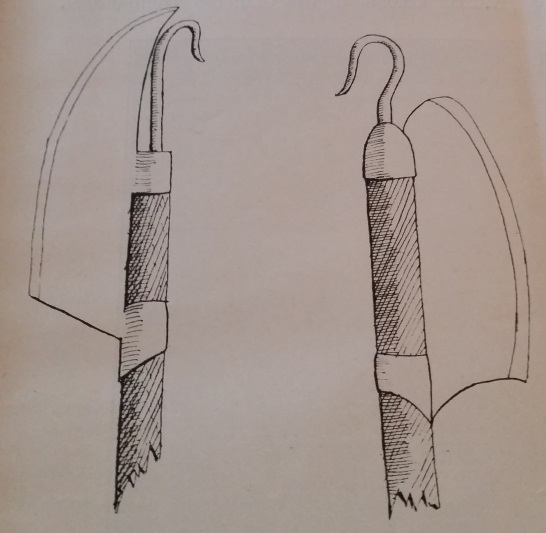
Lochaber Axe, traditional Scottish battle weapon

The crossed weapons in the traditional sword dance is not limited to basket-hilted broadswords. Dancing around crossed Lochaber axes is mentioned as an older version of the dance. The Broadsword indicated the basket-hilted sword worn by officers of Highland Regiments and sometimes miscalled the claymore, which is a large two-handed weapon. The original version of the Broadswords Dance is described in MacLellan’s book: the steps, four strathspey and one quick-time, and the drill for marching on and off a dancing stage are less elaborate than those seen in some present day forms of the dance. It is not an "Old Thyme" dance and it is not regimental in origin.

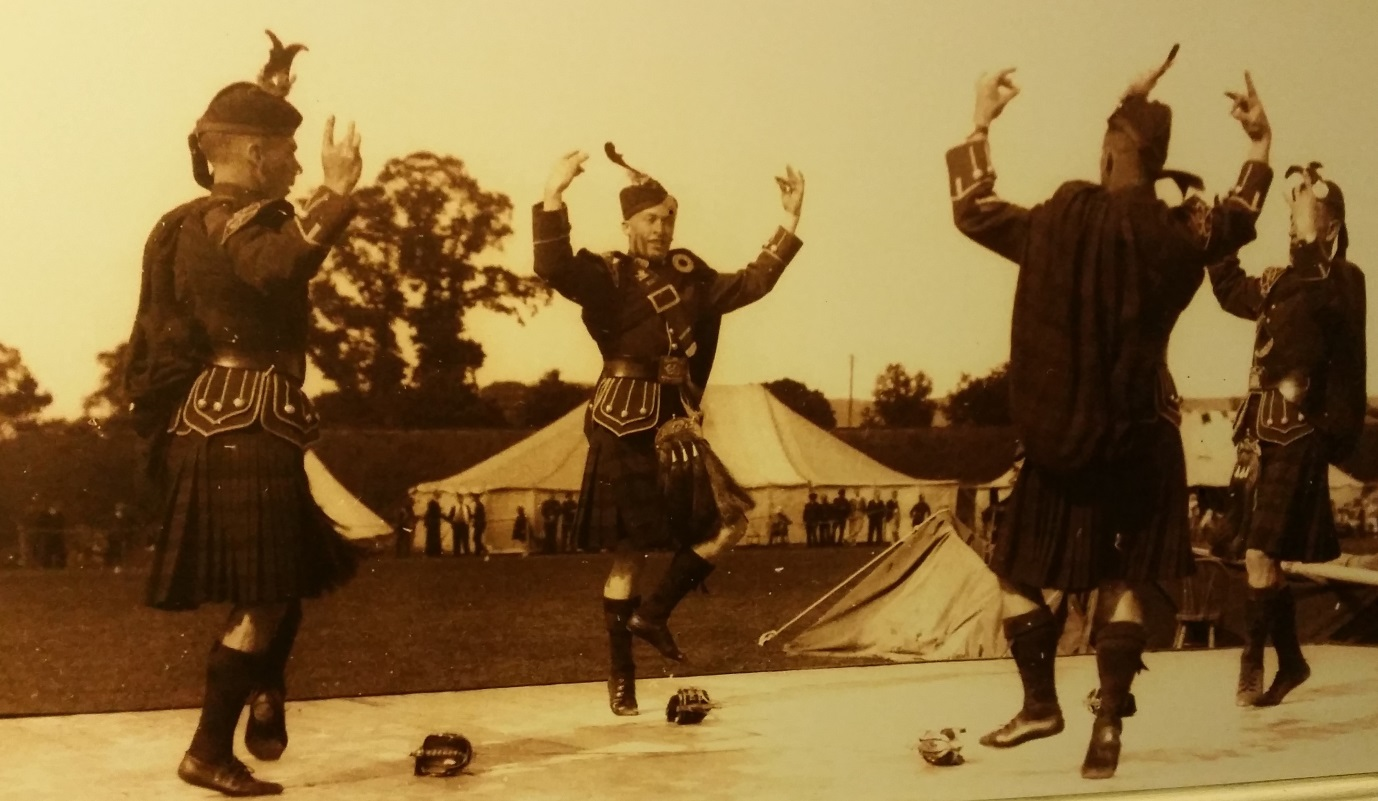
Pipers of the 1st Battalion, Argyll and Sutherland Highlanders, perform the Broadsword.

== Links ==
Illustration from The Book of the Club of True Highlanders showing step patterns and timing of the Sword Dance: http://www.electricscotland.com/history/club/club2%20084.jpg
