= Aboyne dress =

Costume for female dancers in Scottish national dances

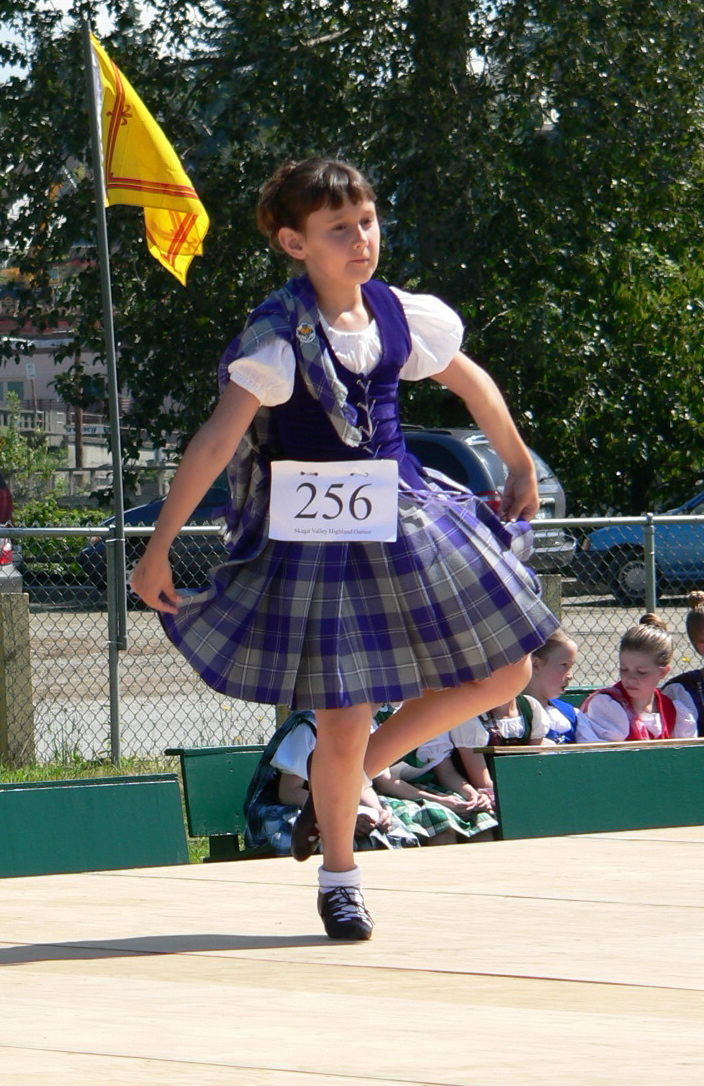
A young Highland dancer wearing Aboyne dress prescribed for female dancers for the national dances.

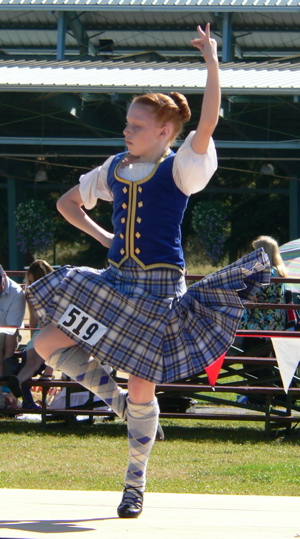
Another young Highland dancer wearing Highland dress.

Aboyne dress is the name given to the prescribed attire for female dancers in the Scottish national dances, such as the Flora MacDonald's fancy, the Scottish lilt, and others. Male dancers wear the kilt for these dances, the kilt being a predominantly male garment. There are two versions of Aboyne dress in use. Some consider the Aboyne as quite suited to the graceful movements of the national dances.

The Aboyne Highland Games, established in 1867, have stipulated this style of attire for female dancers since 1952 for both National and Highland dances.

== Description ==
A typical Aboyne dress consists of a dark bodice or elaborate waistcoat, decorative blouse, full tartan skirt and sometimes a petticoat and apron. Some have a tartan sash (usually draped over the shoulder and coming down towards the hem of the skirt in the back) rather than an apron. While appearing to be simple and plain, a properly made, modern Aboyne dress might and can be quite expensive.

In one version, a tartan pattern skirt is worn with an over-the-shoulder plaid, a white blouse and petticoat, and a velvet bodice. The alternative is a white dress over a petticoat, together with a tartan pattern sash.

== History ==
The name derives from the Aboyne Highland Games in Scotland where, in the early 1950s the dance committee under games patron Lieutenant Colonel John Wilmot Nicol DSO of Ballogie, dissatisfied with the state of affairs of female Highland dance attire, prescribed new rules governing acceptable and better-looking attire for the female dancers. The problem, as they saw it, was that many felt that the female and male dancers should not be wearing the same outfits and that a separate style for women should be developed.

About 1949, the committee banned female dancers from wearing the kilt, sporran or medals. By 1952, they introduced an alternative attire of white blouse, tartan skirt and long black stockings, then for the September 1954 games, a new attire was introduced for all female dancers (previously it did not apply to girls between six and eleven). Approved by the Lord Lyon King of Arms, it was a skirt of light-weight tartan worn over a white petticoat, with a plaid of the same tartan material and a tight fitting sleeveless velvet corsage (the upper part of a woman's dress) over a white blouse. It was designed from the traditional Scottish women's dress that was banned after the introduction of the Act of Proscription 1746 (England).

The men would continue to dance in traditionally male kilt and jacket, wearing bonnets and sporrans.

The original decision of the Aboyne committee applied to both the Highland dances and the national dances. The Royal Scottish Official Board of Highland Dancing a few years later modified the dress code so the Aboyne dress would be used by women for just the national dances, and a kilt-based outfit (without bonnet or sporran) for the Highland dances. To this day, however, at the Aboyne Highland Games, the wearing of the Aboyne dress by women is strongly "preferred", except for the sailor's hornpipe and Irish jig.

== See also ==
- Highland dress
- Kilt
- Scottish Highland dance
