= The Thistle =

Scottish ladies' solo step dance

The Thistle is a Scottish ladies' solo step dance devised by Irene Fidler and published in 2007. This elegant dance performed to a set of waltzes builds on a rich yet relatively little known tradition of Scottish step dancing as maintained within the frame of annual St. Andrew's Summer School of the Royal Scottish Country Dance Society The flower of thistle is reported to have been the symbol of Scotland since 1470s.
