= Flowers of Edinburgh =

Song

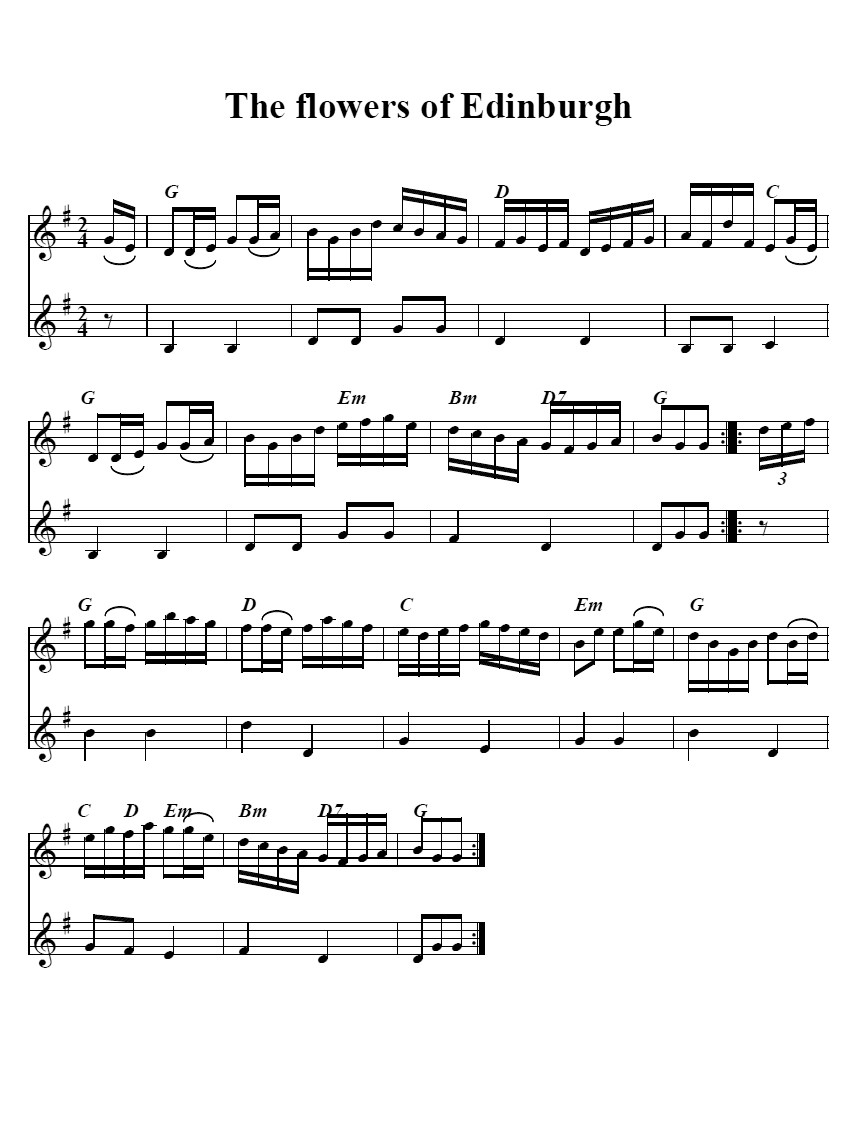
- Published in 477 tune books

Song
- Songwriter: Unknown

"Flowers of Edinburgh" is a traditional fiddle tune, of eighteenth century Scottish lineage. It is also prominent in American fiddle, Canadian fiddle and wherever old time fiddle is cultivated. The tune is also the basis for a Morris Dance, in the Bledington style.

== History ==
According to a self-deprecating secondary report in A Native's Guide to Edinburgh by Tom Mc Rae, the stench from the loch permeated the old city and probably gave rise to the traditional tune "The Flowers of Edinburgh." However, The "Traditional Tune Archives" website gives a more convincing explanation of the genesis of the title, such as that it probably was originally "The Flower (singular) of Edinburgh" and referred to a woman. A 2011 blogspot for "gdaeblogspot" also gives several possible explanations for the title.

The author of this blog suggests the author was the publisher James Oswald. The "Traditional Tune Archives" website gives an earlier date of c 1737 by John Walsh in "Caledonian Country Dances Vol 2".

In America, William Rebbeck published a version of the dance in 1788.

A piper of the Royal Regiment of Scotland played "Flowers of Edinburgh" while the Duke of Edinburgh's coffin was lowered into the vault at Windsor.

== Technical ==
G Major (one sharp)

== Recordings ==
There are over 100 recordings of the piece, including the following:

- 50 Fiddle Solos by Aly Bain
- Born to Fiddle by Matthew Reid
- Castles, Kirks, And Caves by Abby Newton
- Dancing Days by Chris Leslie
- Graham Townsend's 100 Fiddle Hits by Graham Townsend
- Intertwined by Amelia Parker
- Nice to Meet You by Kaitlin Hahn
- Rogha Scoil Samhraidh Willie Clancy 2007 by Various Artists
- Shetland Fiddle Music by School of Scottish Studies, University of Edinburgh
- The Cat That Ate The Candle by John Carty and Brian McGrath
- The Fiddlesticks Collection by Jerry Holland
- The Purple Heather by Vincent Campbell
- Tunes from My Past by Calvin Vollrath

== Other names ==
Blata Duin-Eudain, Knuckle Down, My Love was Once a Bonnie Lad, My Love's Bonny When She Smiles on Me, To the Battle Men of Erin, The Weobley Hankie Dance, The Weobley Hanky Dance.

== Bibliography ==
- Captain Simon Fraser's Airs and Melodies Peculiar to the Highlands of Scotland (1816)

It is also included in Cecil Sharp's "Country Dance Tunes" (1922)

== See also ==
- The Flouers o Edinburgh (play set in Edinburgh by Robert McLellan)
- List of Scottish country dances
- Scottish fiddle
- Music of Ireland
- Music of Scotland
- Old Time Fiddle

== Videographic documentation ==
- Proper performance Ashley MacIsaac's February 20, 2010 concert in Victoria, with guests Qristina & Quinn Bachand. Also featuring Bryan Skinner on bodhran and Jason King on whistle.
- Sometimes played in D Major. Title: Flowers of Edinburgh & Spootiskerry – Ashley MacIsaac & The Bachands.
- Dance tune. Lopez Island 2008
