= Highland Fling =

Traditional Scottish dance

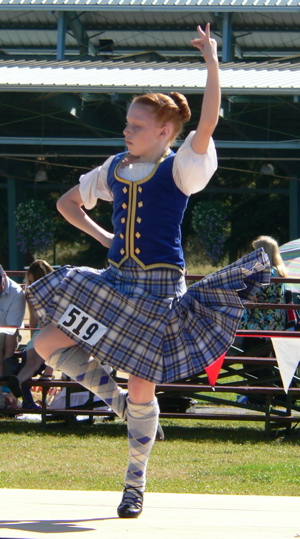
A dancer performing a Highland Fling at the 2005 Pacific Northwest Highland Games

The Highland Fling is a solo Highland dance that gained popularity in the early 19th century. The word 'Fling' means literally a movement in dancing. In John Jamieson's 1808 Etymological Dictionary of the Scottish Language, the Highland Fling was defined as 'one species of movement' in dancing, not as one particular movement. There is some speculation that the first solo Highland Fling dances simply showed off steps that individual dancers preferred in the Strathspey Reel, a social dance.

This dance is now performed at dance competitions and events around the world. One goal of dancers today is to stay in the same spot throughout the dance. The Highland Fling is danced at almost all competition levels, from primary to premier. It is also performed for Highland and theory examinations. Dancers wear a kilt to perform the dance, which is in 4/4 time.

A version of a Fling in a percussive dance style was remembered and danced by John Gillis in Cape Breton Island, Nova Scotia, and those steps were written down in 1957 by Frank Rhodes. Each step was preceded by a travelling step in a circular pathway danced to the first part of the tune Sterling Castle, while the individual Fling steps were danced to the second part of the tune.

== List of steps ==
The dance can be performed as a:

- Four-step dance: usually danced by primary, beginner, and novice dancers at competitions.
- Six-step dance: usually danced by intermediate and premier dancers at competitions.
- Eight-step dance: very rarely at Scottish Official Board of Highland Dancing (SOBHD) competitions, although it is still danced at some traditional Highland Games.

The first and last steps must always be placed in the same spot, but the other steps may be placed as the dancer chooses. For championships competitions the SOBHD specifies a different order of steps for each year. Dancers taking theory exams may also need to know all of these steps, as well as their order, depending on the level they reach.

Musical accompaniment is usually provide by the bagpipes), playing "Monymusk" or any other suitable Strathspey tune.

=== Example steps ===
These following steps are included in the SOBHD text book. The required tempo is 114* beats per minute (bpm):

- First Step: Shedding
- Second Step: Back-stepping
- Third Step: Toe-and-heel
- Fourth Step: Rocking
- Fifth Step: Second back-stepping
- Sixth Step: Cross-over
- Seventh Step: Shake and turn
- Eighth Step: Last shedding

There are many more steps in existence, some of which have been recorded in publications, for example, Traditional Step-Dancing in Scotland while some exist only in the memories of senior dancers.

In 2008 the SOBHD recommended a tempo of 112-124 bpm for the Highland Fling on 2008 is 112-124 bpm. This has slowed considerably over the years – from 192 bpm one hundred years ago, 152 bpm in the 1960s and then 134 bpm in the 1980s.

== In popular culture ==
The Highland Fling is referenced in the lyrics of Harlem hot jazz musician Harry Gibson's 1947 hit "Who Put the Benzedrine in Mrs. Murphy's Ovaltine?"

The Highland Fling can be seen in the 2002 film Nicholas Nickleby, performed by Alan Cumming.

== See also ==
- Highland (Scottish)
- Fling (Scottish)
