= List of pipe bands =

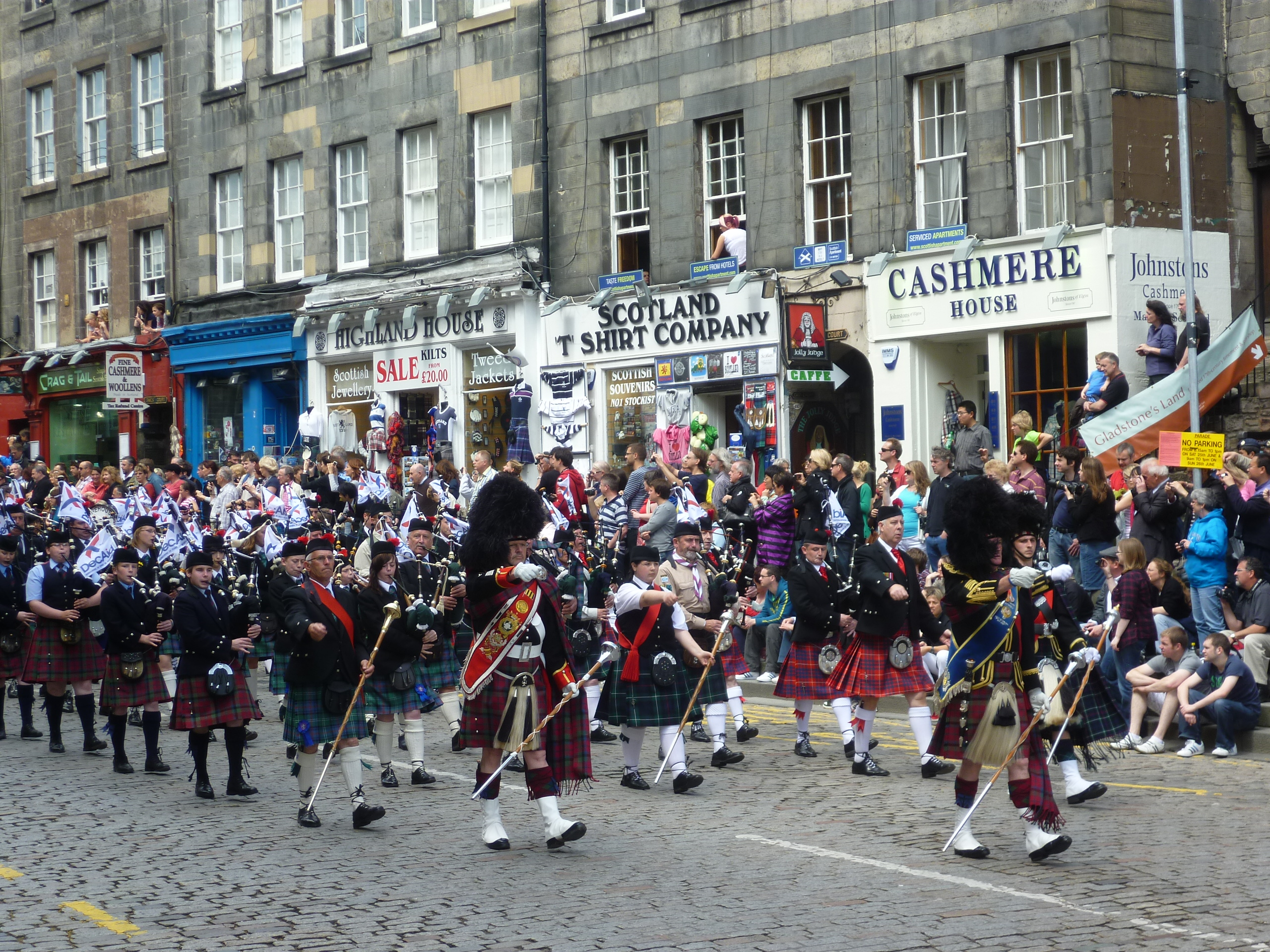
Scottish pipe band marching in Edinburgh

A pipe band is a musical ensemble consisting of pipers and drummers. There are many such bands in the world, which play for ceremonial purposes, recreation, competition or all three. This list encompasses only notable pipe bands with their own Wikipedia page.

== European Pipe Band Associations ==
- Royal Scottish Pipe Band Association (RSPBA), the primary pipe band association, host of the major championships

== North America Pipe Band Associations ==
- Alberta Society of Pipers & Drummers (ASPD), Alberta, Canada
- Atlantic Canada Pipe Band Association (ACPBA), Nova Scotia, Newfoundland, New Brunswick, and Prince Edward Island
- British Columbia Pipers' Association (BCPA), British Columbia, Washington, and Oregon
- Eastern United States Pipe Band Association (EUSPBA), eastern and southern United States
- Midwest Pipe Band Association (MWPBA), midwestern United States
- Pipers & Pipe Band Society of Ontario (PPBSO), Ontario, Canada
- Prairie Pipe Band Association of Manitoba, Manitoba, Canada
- Saskatchewan Pipe Band Association, Saskatchewan, Canada
- Western United States Pipe Band Association (WUSPBA), west and southwestern United States

== European Pipe Bands ==
=== Belgium ===
Pipe Band	Location
Antwerp & District Pipe Band	Antwerp

=== England ===
Pipe Band	Location
Shree Muktajeevan Swamibapa Pipe Band Bolton	Bolton
Shree Muktajeevan Swamibapa Pipe Band London	Kingsbury

=== France ===
Pipe Band	Location/Group
Bagad Cap Caval	Bigouden
Bagad Lann Bihoue	French Navy

=== Northern Ireland ===
Pipe Band	Grade	Location
Aughintober Pipe Band	2	Castlecaulfield
Field Marshal Montgomery Pipe Band	1	Lisburn

=== Republic of Ireland ===
Pipe Band	Grade	Location
St. Laurence O'Toole Pipe Band	1	Dublin
Youghal Pipe Band	4	Youghal

=== Scotland ===
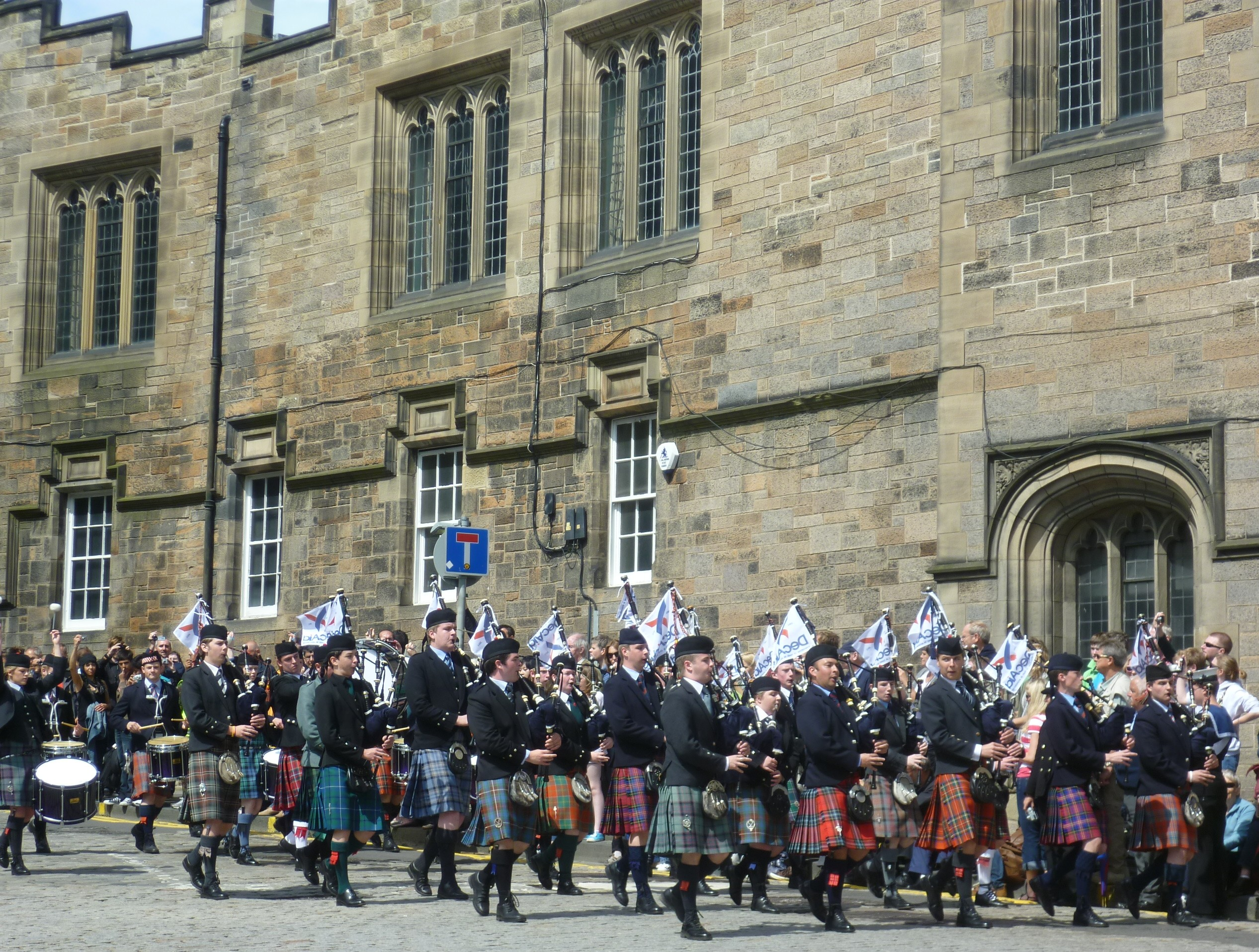
Pipe band on Castlehill, Edinburgh

For a list of British Army regimental pipe bands see Army School of Bagpipe Music and Highland Drumming

Pipe Band	Grade	Location
Boghall and Bathgate Caledonia Pipe Band	1	West Lothian
Denny and Dunipace Pipe Band	3A	Denny, Falkirk
Grampian Police Pipe Band	2	Aberdeen
Inveraray & District Pipe Band	1	Inveraray
Johnstone Pipe Band	3A	Johnstone
Police Scotland Fife Pipe Band	1	Kirkcaldy
Scottish Power Pipe Band	1	Glasgow
Shotts and Dykehead Pipe Band	1	North Lanarkshire
Stonehouse Pipe Band		South Lanarkshire
Torphichen and Bathgate Pipe Band	2	West Lothian
Vale of Atholl Pipe Band	3B	Atholl

==== Notable former bands ====
Pipe Band	Location/Group
Clan Gregor Society Pipe Band	Falkirk
Clan MacRae Society Pipe Band	Glasgow
Dysart and Dundonald Pipe Band	Fife
Glasgow Police Pipe Band	Glasgow
Invergordon Distillery Pipe Band	Invergordon
Johnstone Pipe Band (Grade 1)	Johnstone
Lothian and Borders Police Pipe Band	Edinburgh
Muirhead and Sons Pipe Band	Grangemouth
Red Hackle Pipe Band	Glasgow
Spirit of Scotland Pipe Band	Glasgow

== Americas ==
=== Canada ===
Pipe Band	Grade(s)	Province	Location
78th Fraser Highlanders Pipe Band	1	Ontario	Toronto
78th Highlanders (Halifax Citadel) Pipe Band	1	Nova Scotia	Halifax
96th Highlanders Pipes and Drums	5	Saskatchewan	Saskatoon
Calgary Police Service Pipe Band	3	Alberta	Calgary
City of Regina Pipe Band	2	Saskatchewan	Regina
Conservatory of Performing Arts Pipe Band	5	Saskatchewan	Regina
Greater Victoria Police Pipe Band	4	British Columbia	Victoria
Hamilton Police Pipe Band	4	Ontario	Hamilton
North Shore Highlanders Pipe Band	5	Ontario	Port Dover
Ottawa Police Service Pipe Band	2	Ontario	Ottawa
Peel Regional Police Pipe Band	2, 4, 5	Ontario	Mississauga
Robert Malcolm Memorial Pipe Band	4, 5	British Columbia	Burnaby
Shree Muktajeevan Swamibapa Pipe Band Canada		Ontario	Toronto
RCMP "C" Division Pipes and Drum		Quebec	Montreal
RCMP "H" Division Pipes and Drum		Nova Scotia	Halifax
Simon Fraser University Pipe Band	1	British Columbia	Burnaby
Toronto Police Pipe Band	2	Ontario	Toronto
Vancouver Police Pipe Band		British Columbia	Vancouver
Windsor Police Pipe Band		Ontario	Windsor

=== United States ===
Pipe Band	Grade(s)	State	Location/Group
Cascadia Pipe Band	2, 4	WA	Seattle
Cincinnati Caledonian Pipes and Drums	4	OH	Cincinnati
City of Dunedin Pipe Band	2, 3, 4, 5	FL	Dunedin
Holyoke Caledonian Pipe Band		MA	Holyoke, Massachusetts
Los Angeles Scottish Pipe Band	2	CA	Laguna Niguel
Manchester Pipe Band	3, 5	CT	Manchester, Connecticut
New York Maritime Pipe & Drum Corps		NY	Fort Schuyler, NY
NYPD Pipes and Drums		NY	New York City
Prince Charles Pipe Band	2	CA	San Rafael
Shree Muktajeevan Swamibapa Pipe Band U.S.A		NJ	Secaucus
Stuart Highlanders	5	MA	Boston
Worcester Kiltie Pipe Band	2	MA	Worcester

=== South America ===
Pipe Band	Location
Scottish Pipe Band Association of South America	Montevideo

=== Notable former bands ===
Pipe Band	State/Province	Location/Group
Alberta Caledonia Pipe Band	AB	Edmonton
City of Washington Pipe Band	DC	Washington, DC
Oran Mor Pipe Band	NY	Albany
Triumph Street Pipe Band	BC	Vancouver

== Oceania ==
=== Australia ===
Pipe Band	State	Location/Group
City of Adelaide Pipe Band	South Australia	Adelaide
Coastal Scottish Pipe Band	Western Australia	Perth
Pipes & Drums of the Royal Caledonian Society	South Australia	Adelaide
RVR Pipes and Drums Association	Victoria	Hawthorn
St Marys Pipe Band	New South Wales	St Marys
The Pipeband Club	New South Wales	Sydney
Victoria Police Pipe Band	Victoria	Melbourne
Western Australia Police Pipe Band	Western Australia	Perth

=== New Zealand ===
Pipe Band	Isle	Location/Group
City of Dunedin Pipe Band	South Isle	Dunedin
Hamilton Caledonian Pipe Band	North Isle	Hamilton
New Zealand Police Pipe Band	North Isle	Porirua
Canterbury Caledonian Society Pipe Band	South Isle	Christchurch
Manawatu Scottish Pipe Band	North Isle	Palmerston North

== Africa ==
=== Kenya ===
Pipe Band	Location
Shree Muktajeevan Swamibapa Pipe Band Nairobi	Nairobi

== Asia ==
=== India ===
Pipe Band	Location
Shree Muktajeevan Swamibapa Pipe Band India	Maninagar
