= City of Dunedin Pipe Band (United States) =

Pipe Band out of Dunedin, Florida

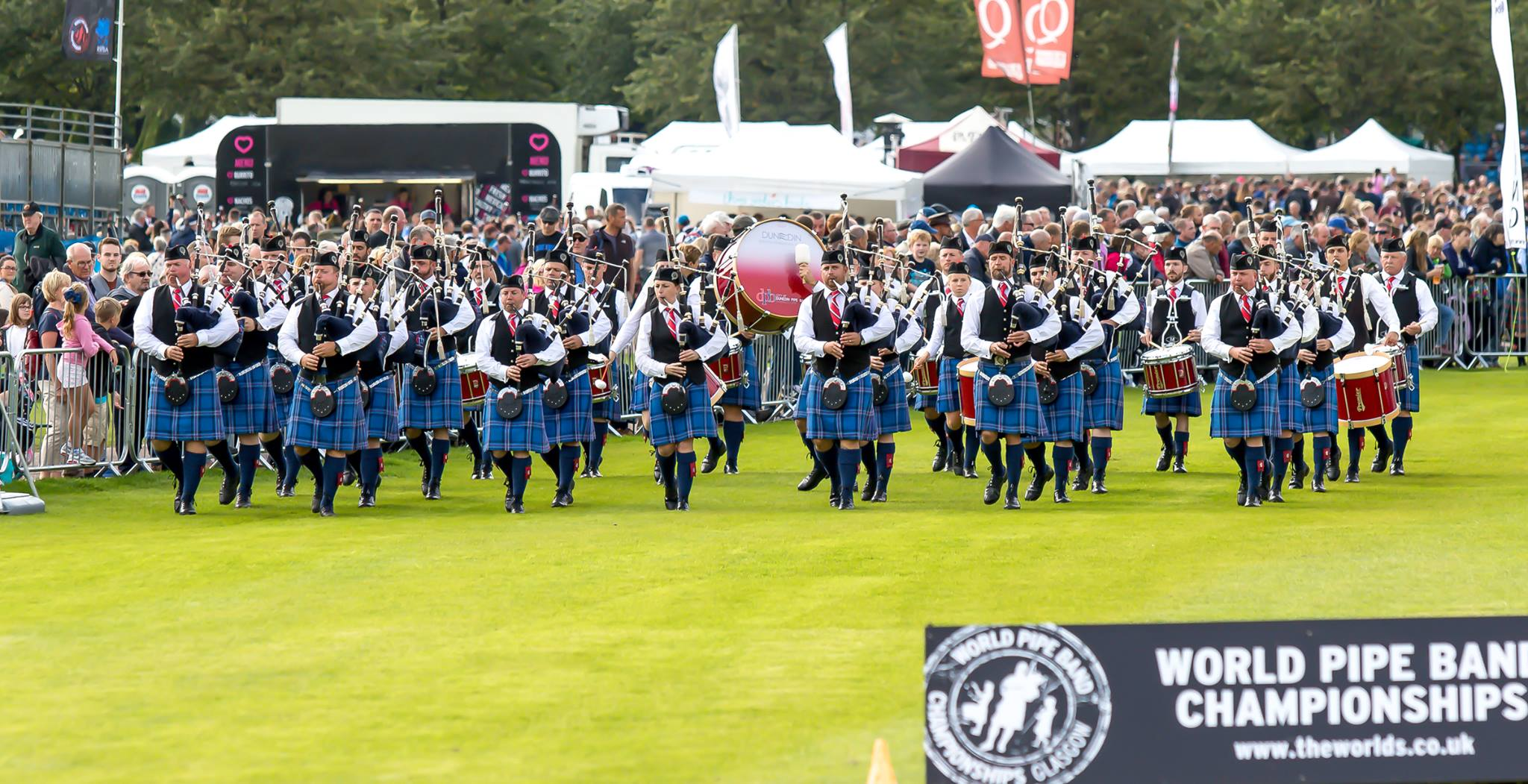
- Established: 1964
- Location: Dunedin, Florida
- Grade: 2
- Pipe major: Iain Donaldson
- Drum sergeant: Eric MacNeill
- Tartan: Edgewater
- Notable honours: World Champions: 2018 (Grade 2); North American Champions: 2019 (Grade 1) 2018 (Grade 2) 2016 (Grade 2)
- Website: www.dunedinpipeband.com

The City of Dunedin Pipe Band is a Grade 2 pipe band out of Dunedin, Florida. It is led by pipe major Iain Donaldson and drum sergeant Eric MacNeill.

== History ==
The city of Dunedin was named by Scottish settlers J.O. Douglas and James Somerville. The name derives from the Scottish Gaelic name Dùn Èideann, the Scottish Gaelic for Edinburgh. The area retained its Scottish roots, and the City of Dunedin Pipe Band was founded in 1964 as a way for kids to get together and play pipes and drums they had learned in local schools.

In 1982 Keith was recruited to take over the piping and drumming program in Dunedin, Florida. As Piping Director, he oversaw the growth of the operation, building it to comprise three bands, the best of which rose to a high-standard Grade 2 band, placing well at the North American Championships and at the World Championships in Scotland. A native of Paisley, Scotland and a pupil of the great Peter MacLeod Sr., Keith made his mark in piping after he immigrated to Canada in 1952, and subsequently to the United States to settle in Dunedin, Florida, where he became synonymous with the southern U.S. piping scene and the highly successful Dunedin High School piping and drumming program. He started piping at age 11 as one of the earliest students at the College of Piping. He had early instruction from College of Piping co-founder Seumas MacNeill, and received additional tuition from college instructors such as Bob Hardie, John Garroway and Archie MacNeill, the famous blind piper.He taught hundreds of pipers, many of whom have gone on to teach many of their own pupils.

On October 1, 2011, Iain Donaldson took over as Band Director, replacing long-time pipe major Sandy Keith stepped down after 30 years. The next summer, the band finished tenth in Grade 3A at the 2012 World Pipe Band Championships.

In May 2014, the band was promoted to Grade 2 by the EUSPBA.

In August 2015, the band announced the hiring of Eric MacNeill as Drumming Director to oversee the organization's drumming program, as well as take over as drum sergeant of the Grade 2 band. MacNeill had previously been drum sergeant of the Oran Mor Pipe Band and most recently a member of the Simon Fraser University Pipe Band drum corps.

On August 17, 2018, the band won their first World Championship, taking home the top prize in Grade 2. They were unanimous winners, taking first place all four categories (Piping 1, Piping 2, Drumming, Ensemble).

Following their success overseas, the band was officially promoted to Grade 1 by the EUSPBA in December 2018. At the time of their promotion, they were the only Grade 1 band in the United States.

== Competition ==
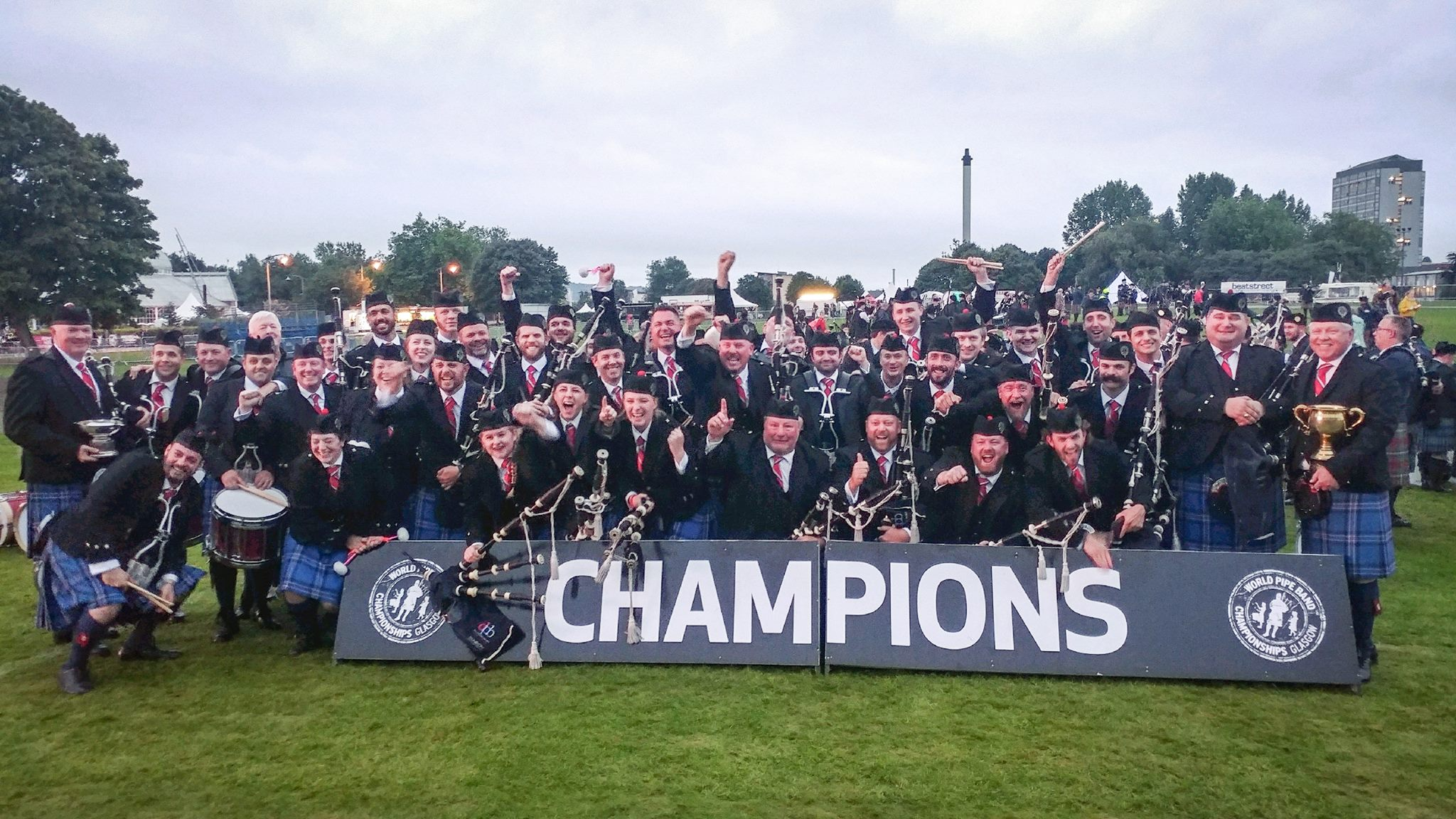
The City of Dunedin Pipe Band after their 2018 World Championship in Grade 2

The band competes in contests throughout the Eastern United States sanctioned by the Eastern United States Pipe Band Association. In addition to the premier band in Grade 1, they also field bands in Grades 3, 4 and 5.

They regularly travel to the North American Championships in Maxville, Ontario. They have won numerous titles throughout their 4 competitive bands since 2014. These include Grade 1: 2019, Grade 2: 2016, 2018, Grade 3: 2014, Grade 4: 2015.

The band won its first major contest in Grade 1 winning the North American Championships on August 3, 2019. They were unable to experience the customary celebrations afterward, as the 78th Fraser Highlanders Pipe Band were incorrectly announced as winners and marched off the field. The bands were told later that evening that multiple errors had occurred and the City of Dunedin Pipe Band were indeed winners, and became the first American champions in Grade 1 since Worcester Kiltie of Massachusetts in the 1960s.

== Band leadership ==
=== Pipe majors ===
- Sandy Keith (1982-2011)
- Iain Donaldson (2011–present)

=== Drum sergeants ===
- Tim Garren (?-2015)
- Eric MacNeill (2015–present)
