= London Fire Fighters Pipe Band =

Canadian pipe band organization

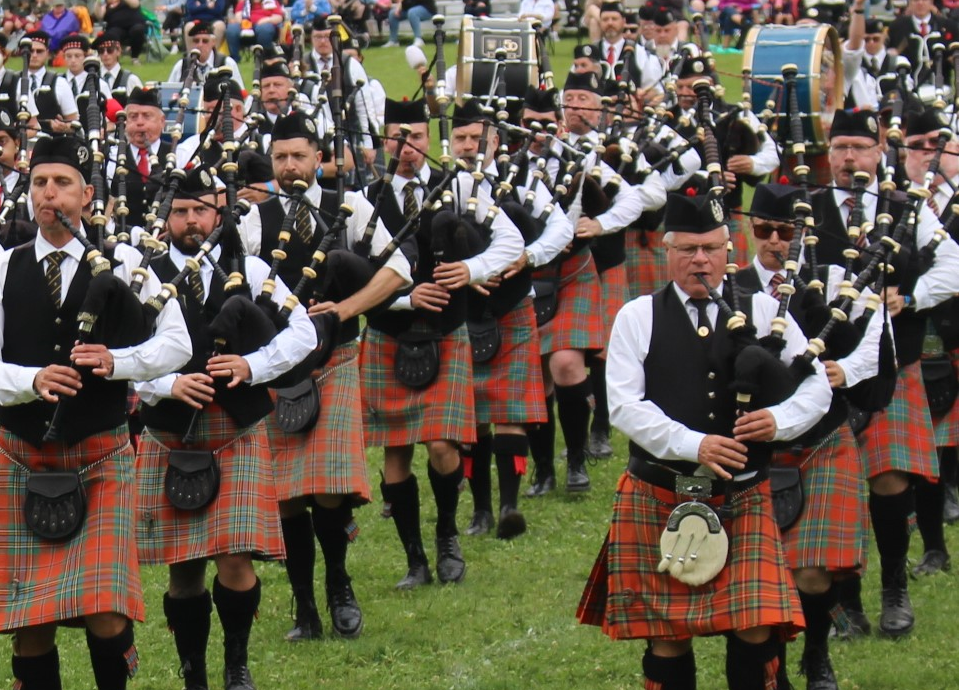
- Established: 1921
- Location: London, Ontario, Canada
- Grade: 4, 5
- Pipe major: John Cairns
- Tartan: Ancient Maclean of Duart
- Notable honours: 2025 PPBSO Champion Supreme (Grade 5)

The London Fire Fighters Pipe Band (LFFPB) is a competitive and performance pipe band based in London, Ontario, Canada. Established as an independent entity in 2003, the bagpipe-playing band traces its lineage to 1921, making it one of Ontario's oldest pipe bands with over a century of continuous operation.

== History ==
=== Early lineage (1921–2003) ===
The London Fire Fighters Pipe Band traces its roots to 1921, when it was founded as the St. Thomas Legion Branch 41 Pipe Band. Active through the 1920s and 1930s, it stood alongside leading Ontario ensembles such as the 48th Highlanders and the Argyll and Sutherland Highlanders before going dormant during and after the Second World War. The band was revived in 1957 under the Aylmer Legion Pipe Band, competing in Grade 2 and moving up to Grade 1 after the 1960 season. It briefly merged with the Chrysler Highlanders in 1963, performed across North America, and returned to St. Thomas Legion sponsorship the following year.

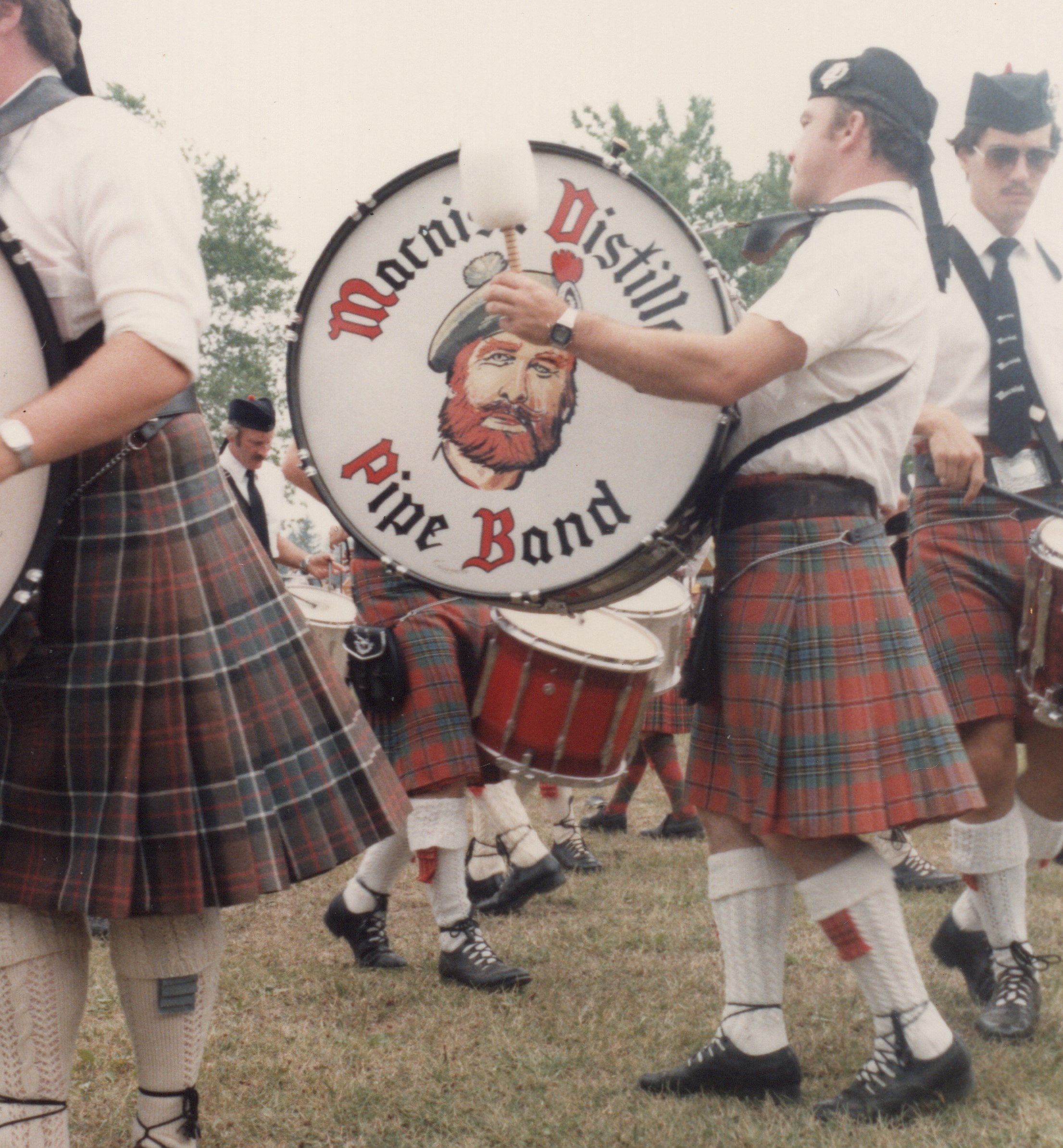
Macnish Distillery Pipe Band

In 1968, the group became the St. Thomas Police Association Pipe Band, competing steadily through the 1970s and 1980s under several sponsors. As the MacNish Distillery Pipe Band (1976–1987), it enjoyed major success, including winning the U.S. Open Pipe Band Championship at the 1978 Alma Highland Games—its fifth consecutive U.S. circuit title. The ensemble later operated as ScotsAire (1987–1991) and again as the St. Thomas Police Pipe Band (1991–2003) before eventually transitioning to the modern London Fire Fighters Pipe Band identity.

=== Contemporary period (2003–present) ===
The band was officially established as the London Fire Fighters Pipe Band in January 2003, acquiring its current name and sponsorship structure. This transition formalized the band's affiliation with the London Professional Fire Fighters Association.

In 2025, the London Fire Fighters Pipe Band was upgraded from Grade 5 to Grade 4 competitive status within the PPBSO, after taking the title of Champion Supreme in grade 5 for the 2025 competition season.

== Organization and competition ==
The band currently fields two competitive/performance ensembles:

- Grade 4 Band: The primary competitive ensemble that participates in PPBSO-sanctioned competitions at the Grade 4 level.
- Grade 5 Band: An entry-level band focusing on developing musicians who are becoming proficient on their instruments, providing performance opportunities while building competitive skills for potential advancement to higher grades.

Both ensembles compete as the London Fire Fighters Pipe Band and as a combined unit, they perform at community events including Fall Fairs, parades, Remembrance Day ceremonies, and other community celebrations.

== Instruction ==
The band operates the London School of Piping & Drumming, providing instruction for beginning and intermediate level musicians. The school offers regular introductory sessions and classes for learners at various proficiency levels.
