= Cascadia Pipe Band =

American pipe band

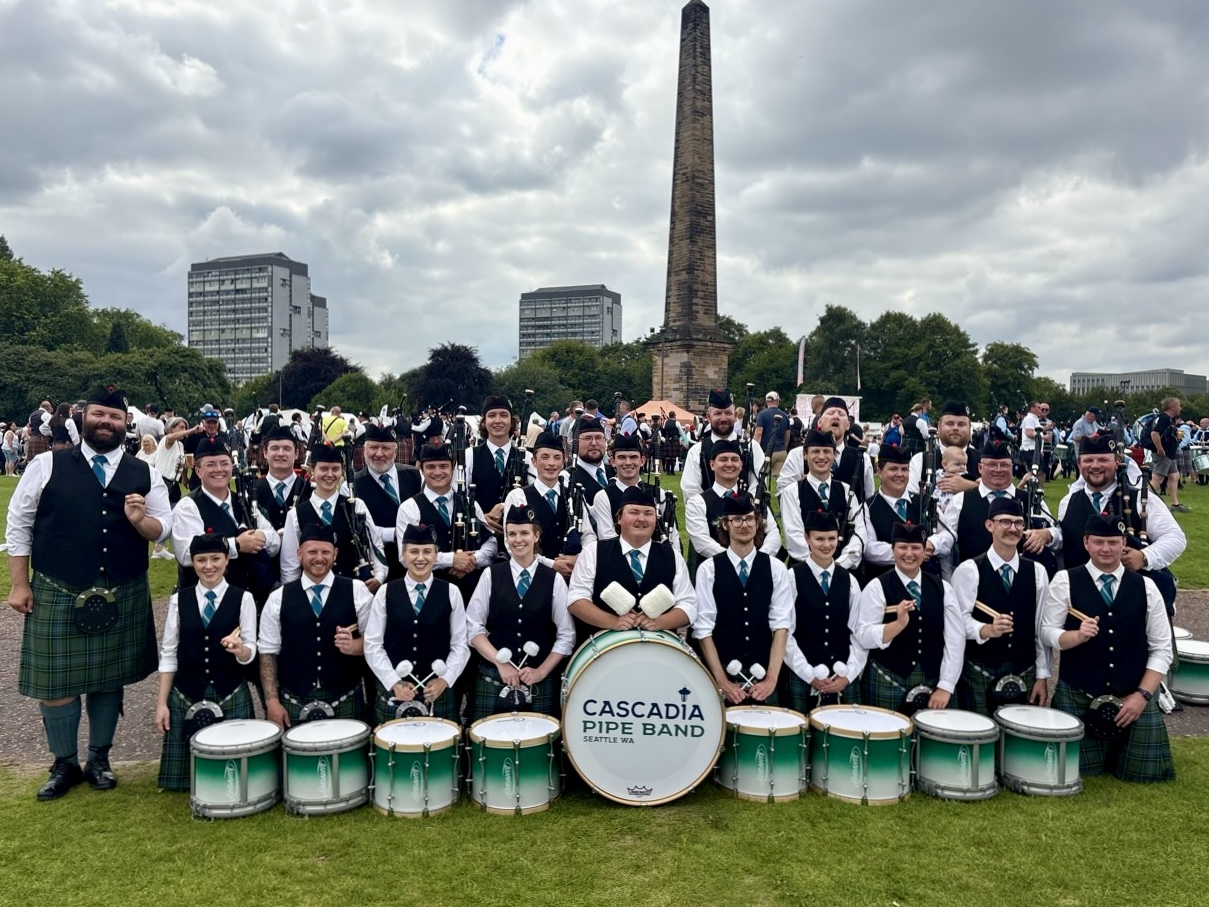
- Cascadia Pipe Band at the 2025 World Pipe Band Championships in Glasgow, Scotland
- Established: 2021
- Location: Seattle, Washington
- Grade: 2
- Pipe major: Patrick Downing
- Drum sergeant: Steven Wheeler
- Tartan: Ancient Hunting MacMillan
- Website: cascadiapipeband.org

The Cascadia Pipe Band is a Grade 2 pipe band based in Seattle, Washington. It is led by pipe major Patrick Downing and leading-drummer Steven Wheeler.

== History ==
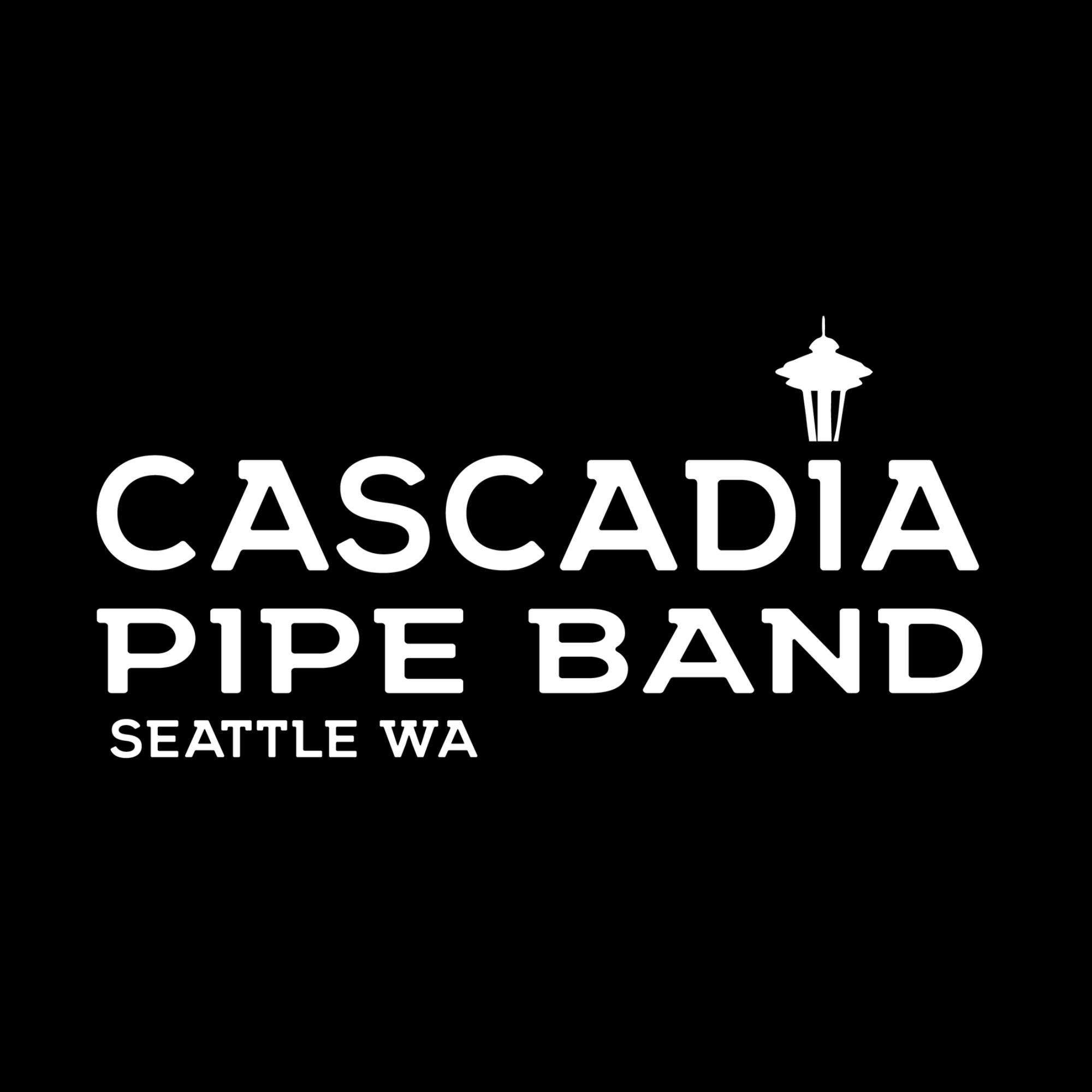
Cascadia Pipe Band Logo

The Cascadia Pipe Band was formed in 2021 by four friends; Patrick Downing, Kyle Gaul, Matt Maier, and Aaron Stone; with the shared goal of forming a competitive Grade 3 pipe band based in Seattle, and beginning to compete in 2022. After attracting some more members, the band had a successful 2022 season, competing in the BC Pipers' Association competition circuit, and being promoted to Grade 2 for the 2023 season. This made Cascadia the first Grade 2 pipe band in Washington since the old City of Seattle Pipe Band, which disbanded in 1990. Since being promoted to Grade 2, the band has won the BCPA Grand Aggregate award in every one of its seasons.

The band travelled to the Scottish Highland Gathering and Games in Pleasanton, California in 2023, 2024, and 2026; the Chicago Highland Games in 2024; and the World Pipe Band Championships in Glasgow, Scotland in 2025 and 2026.

In 2024, Cascadia created a Grade 4 development band to help develop talent in the Pacific Northwest.

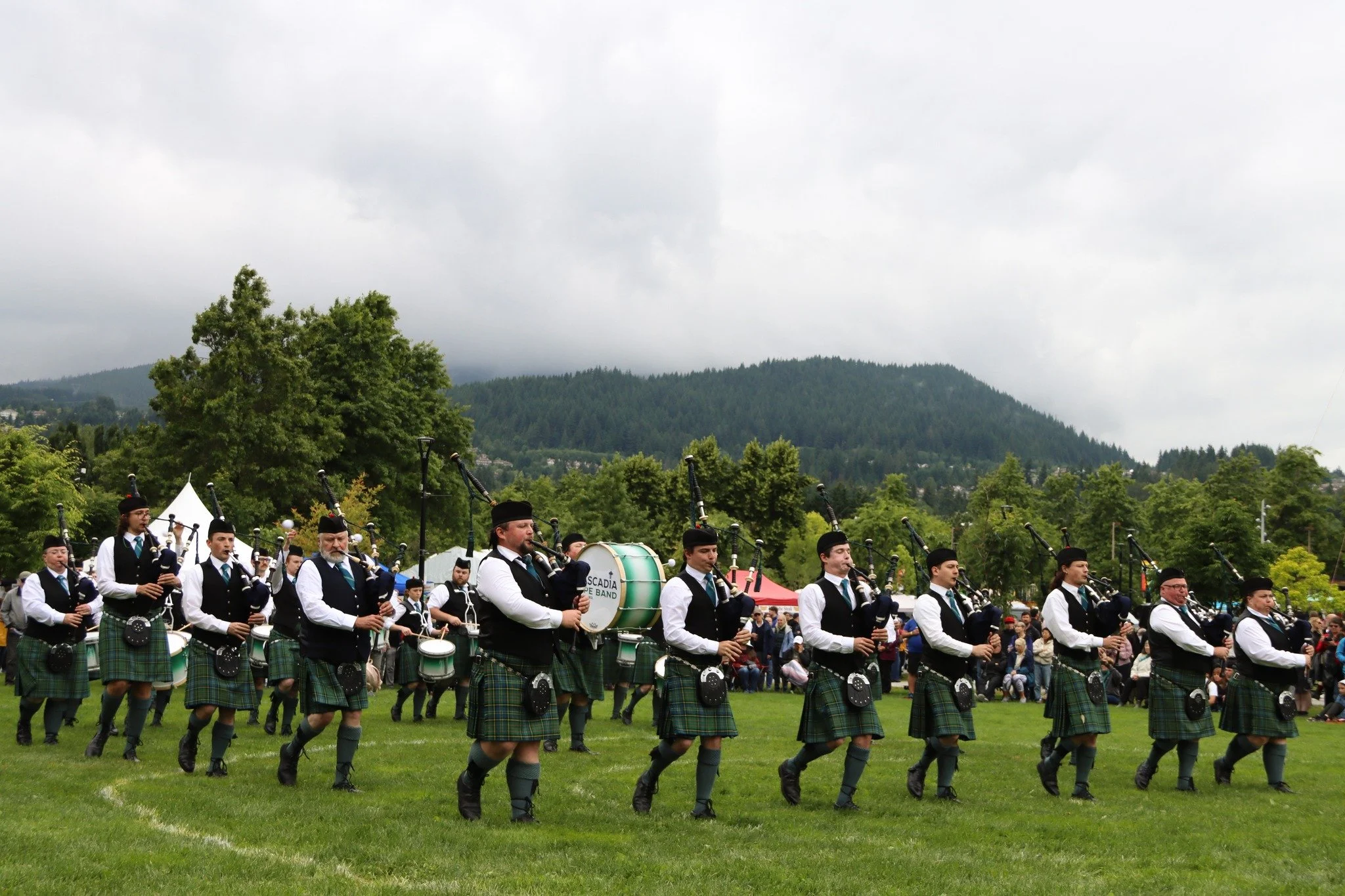
Cascadia Pipe Band at the 2025 BC Highland Games

== Personnel ==
The band is led by pipe major Patrick Downing, who is one of the band's founders. Before founding Cascadia, Downing was a long-time member of the Vancouver-based Triumph Street Pipe Band. Steven Wheeler took over as leading-drummer in 2023. Before joining the band, Wheeler played in the Grade 1 City of Dunedin Pipe Band for two years and led the Grade 2 Robert Malcolm Memorial Pipe Band before that. Although the band is based in Seattle, it has several Canadian members from Vancouver, who commute to band practice bi-weekly.
