= The Pipeband Club =

Australian pipe band

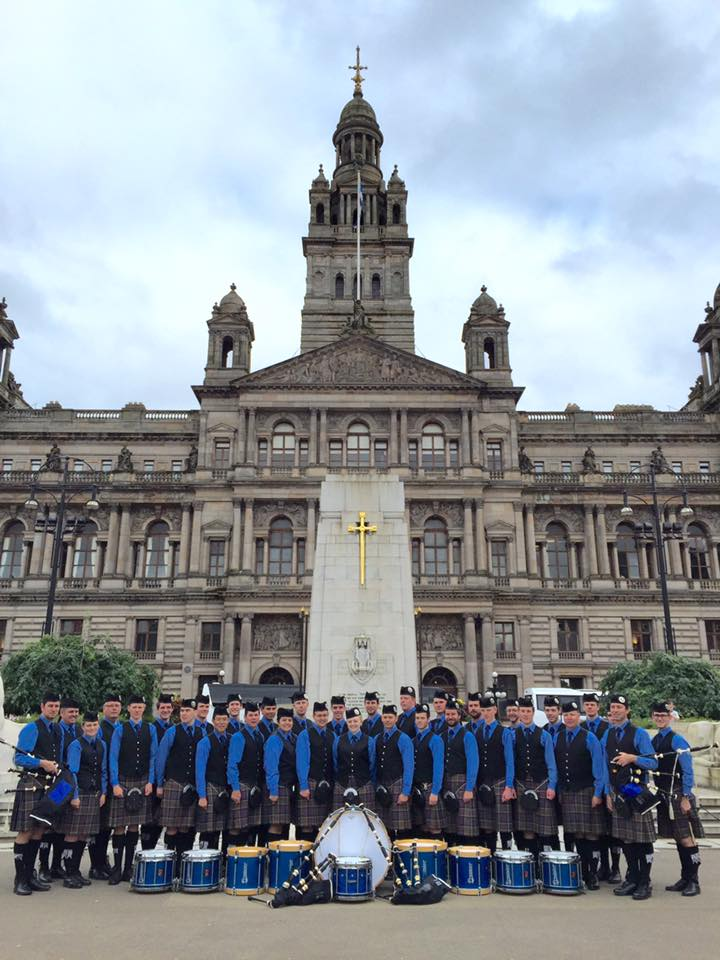
The Pipe Band Club
- Established: 2008
- Location: Sydney, Australia
- Tartan: Ancient McDonald of Clan Ranald
- Notable honours: Australian Championships (Grade 1): Winners (2008), Winners (2010), 3rd place (2012) Australian Championships (Grade 2): Winners (2014), Winners (2016), 2nd place (2018), 2nd place (2022) World Pipe Band Championships (Grade 2): 9th place (2015), 8th place (2017), 3rd place (2019), 3rd place (2024), 3rd place (2026)

The Pipe Band Club is a competitive pipe band located in Sydney, Australia. The band is currently in Grade 2, and occasionally competes in Grade 1 (open) contests in addition to its own grade. It is the leading pipe band in NSW and has consistently held the state championship title every year since inauguration.

Although primarily focused on competitions, The Pipe Band Club also regularly participates in community and cultural functions. Individual members of the band compete in Australia and abroad in solo piping and drumming contests, and miniband contests. Members also contribute to the movement through education, and by serving in various roles on state and national governing bodies.

The Pipe Band Club took 3rd place in a field of 19 bands for the 2024 World Pipe Band Championships Grade 2 final. This was the band's 6th appearance at the World Championships.

== History ==
The band formed in mid-2008 after an exodus of the majority of the playing roster from St Marys District Band Club, a long-standing Sydney band in which the group had been attending the World Championships in 2006-2008 under the leadership of Scott Nicolson and Mark Romer. This departure of the bulk of the player group, which included all those in leadership roles, and the subsequent creation of a new band was sparked by a disagreement between Nicolson and the St Mary's Band Club's board of directors, culminating in Nicolson having his club membership revoked and thus unable to enter the premises for any purpose including band practice.

The new entity relocated its operations to The Scots College in Bellevue Hill, where the Pipe Sergeant was employed as the piping tutor of the school pipe band. With this informal cooperation between the Scots College band and The Pipe Band Club established, the Pipe Band Club announced the formation of a "development" band that would compete in Grades 4 and 3, providing a stepping stone for aspiring players to reach the senior band. This band was active for a few years, and even travelled overseas to compete in the Square Day contest in Palmerston North, New Zealand, where the PBC Development band won Grade 4.

The Pipe Band Club attended The World Pipe Band Championships in 2009 and 2010, still competing in Grade 1 despite the loss of some players in the transition from the previous band. In 2010 the band's Pipe Sgt Angus Roberts was elected Pipe Major. The band was the winner of the Australian Championship (Grade 1) in 2008 and 2010,. In 2012 the band requested to be relegated to Grade 2 to begin a period of rebuilding after a mediocre set of results that year, and this was approved by the Australian Pipe Band Association (now called Pipe Bands Australia). The band, led by Pipe Major Angus Roberts and Drum Sergeant Scott Miller, won the 2014 Australian Championship in Grade 2. The band then went on to host the NSW Championships in November of the same year, marking the first time the band had acted as a contest promoter.

Still in Grade 2 in 2015, the band secured a win in the Queensland State Championships, then traveled to Scotland for a two-week tour ending with the World Championships in August 2015. The band took 2nd place in Grade 2 at North Berwick and 3rd place in Grade 2 at Perth. A week later, at the World Championships, the band took 2nd place in their heat before progressing and placing 9th in the final.

In 2016, The Pipe Band Club once again retained their NSW Championship title and shortly after, the Australian Championship title (Grade 2) in a field of five competitors, with Moorabbin City taking 2nd and Hawthorne City placing 3rd.

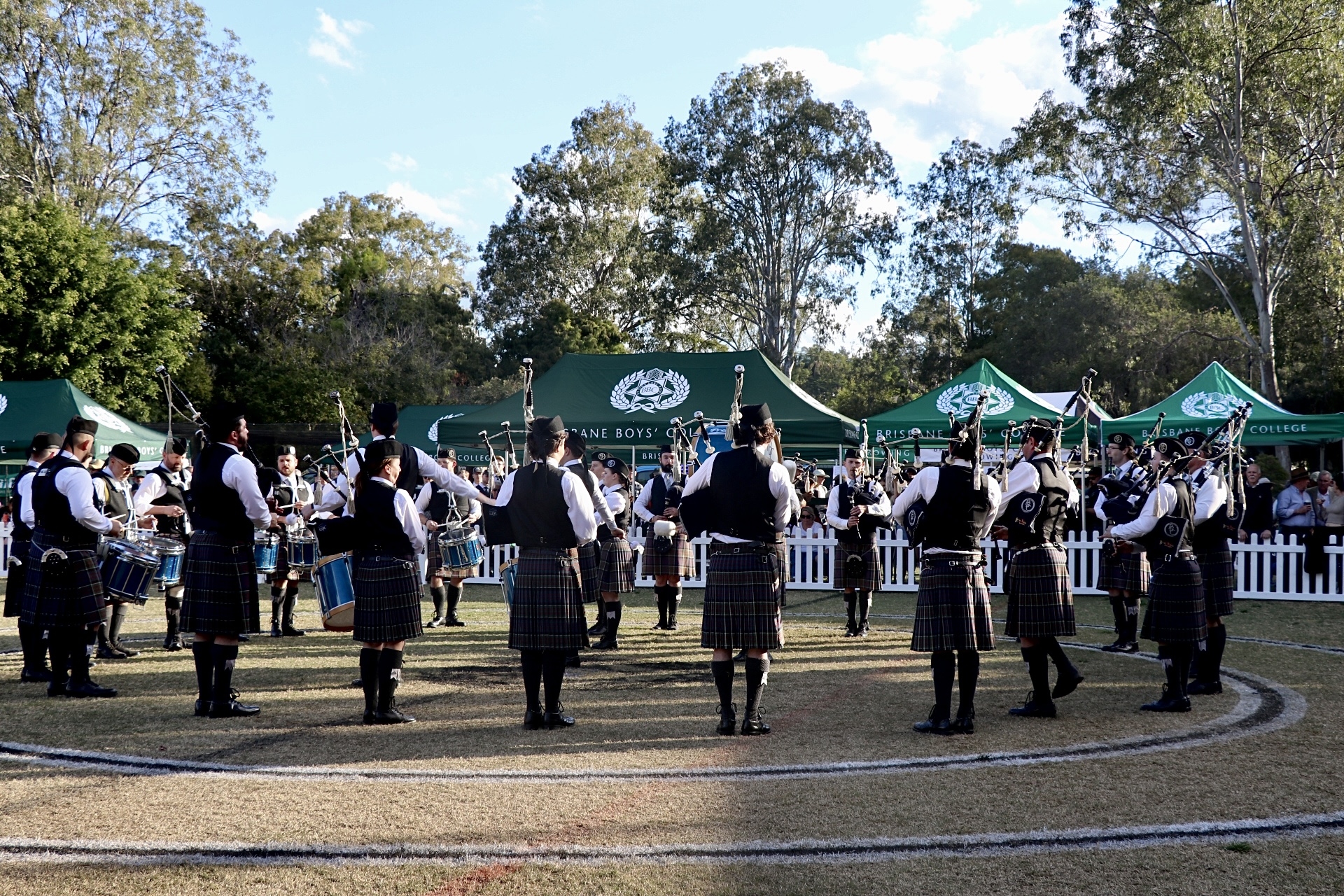
Pipe Band Club (Queensland Pipe Band Championships)

With Roberts having stepped down as Pipe Major due to moving from Sydney, the band elected then-Pipe Sgt Paul Hughes as his replacement. Now led by Hughes, The Pipeband Club returned to Scotland in 2017, competing at North Berwick Highland Games and Bridge of Allan Highland Games in preparation for the World Pipe Band Championships in Glasgow. The band secured 4th place in Grade 2 at North Berwick in a field of 14 bands, and at Bridge of Allan, securing 5th in Grade 2 (14 competitors in the field) and a 1st place in Grade 1 (in a field of 8 competitors), an unexpected result for a band playing in a higher division than their official grading. At the 2017 World Pipe Band Championships, the band placed 2nd in their qualifying heat, thus earning one of twelve spots in the Grade 2 final. On this occasion, the band improved on their 2015 result by placing 8th in the final.

The band had a relatively quiet year in 2018, though it marked their 10th anniversary. The band took 2nd place in The Australian Pipeband Championships (Grade 2) behind Hawthorn Pipe Band, which were held in Brisbane that year. The band was also active in Sydney and regional contests throughout the year as usual.

2019 saw The Pipe Band Club return once more to Scotland to campaign in Grade 2 for the World Championships. Their first outing on the tour was North Berwick Highland Games. Grade 2 featured ten bands and was won by St Thomas Alumni (USA), with The Pipe Band Club taking second place. The band also competed in the Grade 1 event, a March-Strathspey-Reel competition, which was also a field of ten entrants. Playing "up" a grade, they nonetheless took 5th place, placing ahead of Canterbury Caledonian Society, a New Zealand Grade 1 band also on tour that year; and in piping scores above former Grade 1 World Champions The 78th Fraser Highlanders of Canada.

A week later, the band took the field in Glasgow Green for their Grade 2 qualifying heat. By the luck of the draw, Australian rivals Hawthorn Pipe Band were in the same heat. This time the Pipe Band Club prevailed and took second place in the heat, while Hawthorn secured 8th and did not progress to the final. In the hotly contested Grade 2 World Championship final, The Pipe Band Club claimed third place, behind Closkelt (Northern Ireland) by a single point. This successful tour marked another high point in the band's history.

There were no World Championships or Australian Championships in 2020 due to the global pandemic. The Pipe Band Club did appear uncontested in Grade 2 at a small contest in Sydney in November 2020. and again with a win (in a field of 3 bands) at MacLean Highland Gathering in 2021.

Pipe Band Club performing Aus Pipe Band Championships 2022

https://www.youtube.com/watch?v=Fe6WOhSdzq0

In 2024, the band made the journey back to Scotland to campaign in Grade 2 at the World Pipe Band Championships. Opening the tour at the European Championships in Perth, one week out from the Worlds, they placed 2nd overall in Grade 2, with both piping judges awarding them 1st place.

Pipe Band Club - European Championships 2024 (Grade 2)

The Grade 2 contest at the World Pipe Band Championships drew 19 competing bands in a single medley format. Performing their "Girl From Dungannon" medley, the Pipe Band Club took 3rd place, again earning strong recognition from the piping judges, who placed them 1st and 2nd respectively. The 2024 Scotland tour stands as one of the highlights of the band's history.

The Pipe Band Club Australia 3rd place in Grade 2 at the World Pipe Band Championships 2024
