= City of Dunedin Pipe Band (New Zealand) =

New Zealand pipe band

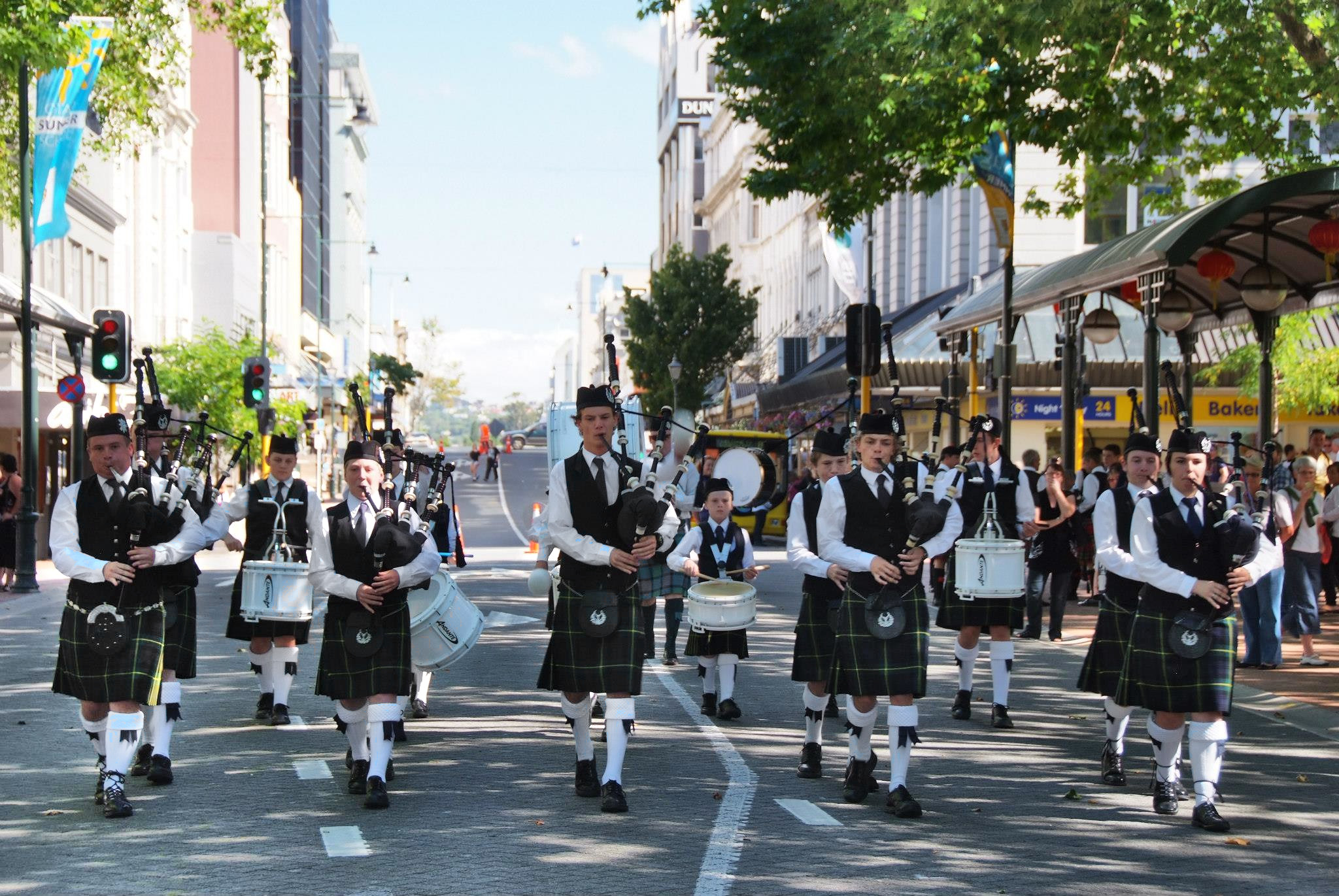
- Established: 1898; 128 years ago
- Location: Dunedin, New Zealand
- Grade: 4B
- Pipe major: Ruaridh Martynoga
- Drum sergeant: Sam Coutts
- Tartan: Gordon
- Notable honours: 2003, 2007, 2008 New Zealand Grade Two Champions. Promoted to Grade One 2008
- Website: www.facebook.com/CODPBNZ/

The City of Dunedin Pipe Band is a competitive pipe band, based in Dunedin, New Zealand. The band is led by Pipe Major Ruaridh Martynoga and Drum Sergeant Sam Coutts. The band wears the Gordon Tartan. The band regularly performs at all home games for the Otago Highlanders Super Rugby franchise at Forsyth Barr Stadium and graduation parades for the University of Otago and Otago Polytechnic.

== History of the band ==
The City of Dunedin Pipe Band was formed in 1898, and is the second oldest band in the southern hemisphere drawing its membership from right around the greater Dunedin area, as well as throughout Otago. Former Pipe-Majors include Brian Switalla (World Champion with Field Marshal Montgomery Pipe Band) and Geoff Hallberg (current member of the Canterbury Caledonian Society Pipe Band, the 2012&2013 NZ Champion Grade one band). The band also has had several high-profile members who have succeeded on the international solo stage, including Greg Wilson (a member of the City of Dunedin Boy's Band), Richard Hawke and Airdrie Stewart.

The Band has won the Grade 2 New Zealand Championships 3 times in the last since 2000; in 2003, 2007 and again in 2008. The Band was promoted for its success to Grade 1. It was regraded to Grade 2 in 2010.

In 2012, the Grade 4 and Juvenile bands went to Australia and competed in the Australian Pipe Band Championships, finishing 5th in Grade 4 overall. The Juvenile band went on in 2013 to win the South Island Juvenile Championships at the Otago Southland Centre Pipe Band Championships.

The band currently maintains a Grade 4 registration.

== Results ==
2003 – 1st Overall Grade 2 (NZ)

2004 – 6th MSR, 5th Medley, 5th Overall Grade 2 (NZ)

2005 – 4th MSR, 5th Medley, 5th Overall Grade 2 (NZ)

2006 – 5th MSR, 2nd= Medley, 3rd Overall Grade 2 (NZ)

2007 – 1st MSR, 2nd Medley, 1st Overall Grade 2 (NZ)

2008 – 1st MSR, 1st Medley, 1st Overall Grade 2 (NZ)
