= Aughintober Pipe Band =

Northern Irish pipe band

- Established: 1949 (as a pipe band)
- Location: Castlecaulfield
- Grade: n/a
- Pipe major: Glenn Ferry
- Drum sergeant: Roy Ferry
- Tartan: Royal Stewart

Aughintober Pipe Band is a pipe band from Castlecaulfield in County Tyrone, Northern Ireland.

== History ==
The band was originally a flute ensemble, but changed to a pipe band in 1949.

In 1997, the band registered with the Royal Scottish Pipe Band Association to enter competitions.

After the 2009 season, the band was upgraded from Grade 3A to Grade 2, having been upgraded from 3B to 3A in 2006.

The pipe major of the band is Gary Waterson, and the leading is drummer Stephen Young.

== Achievements in RSPBA competition ==
2010, Grade 2

- World Pipe Band Championship finalists
- Ulster Drum Corps Champions
- Ulster Bass Section Champions

2009, Grade 3A

- Ulster Champions
- Ulster Pipe Corps Champions
- Ulster Bass Section Champions
- All Ireland Bass Section Champions
- All Ireland Drum Corps Champions
- British Drum Corps Champions*
- Scottish Champions*
- Scottish Drum Corps Champions*
- County Tyrone Champions
- County Tyrone Pipe Corps Champions
- County Tyrone Drum Corps Champions
- Banbridge Indoor Champions
- Banbridge Indoor Drum Corps Champions

2008, Grade 3A

- Northern Ireland Champion of Champions
- Ulster Champions
- Ulster Pipe Corps Champions
- All Ireland Champions
- All Ireland Pipe Corps Champions * All Ireland Champions
- All Ireland Bass Section Champions * All Ireland Champions
- All Ireland Marching & Deportment Champions * All Ireland Champions

2007, Grade 3A

- Ulster Pipe Corps Champions

2006, Grade 3B

- World Pipe Band Champions*
- World Drum Corps Champions* World Pipe Band Champions*

2005, Grade 4A

- Northern Ireland Champion of Champions
- World Pipe Corps Champions*

2001, Grade 4B

- World Pipe Band Champions*
- World Drum Corps Champions*
- British Champions*
- British Drum Corps Champions*

* = major championship
