= Ottawa Police Service Pipe Band =

- Established: 1969
- Location: Ottawa, Ontario, Canada
- Grade: 2
- Pipe major: Jacob Dicker
- Drum sergeant: Joe Kiah
- Tartan: Red Ross
- Website: http://www.ottawapolice.ca/en/about-us/Pipe-Band.aspx

The Ottawa Police Service Pipe Band is a grade 2 competitive pipe band based in Ottawa, Ontario, Canada. As well as participating in competitions, the band performs at civic events, parades and charitable fund-raisers.

== History ==
The Ottawa Police Service Pipe Band was founded in 1969, to promote good public relations and to play at the funerals of police officers.

In 2012, the band played for the return of Olympic athletes at the Ottawa International Airport.

The band won the Pipers' and Pipe Band Society of Ontario grade 2 Champion Supreme Award in 2012, 2013, and 2014.

On 7 July 2013, members of the band performed Mull of Kintyre on stage with Paul McCartney as part of his Out There concert tour. The band performed to a sold-out hometown crowd at the Canadian Tire Centre in Ottawa, Canada.

The band won the North American Pipe Band Championship in grade 2 at the Glengarry Highland Games in 2013 and 2014.

In October 2014, the band was promoted to grade 1 by the Pipers' and Pipe Band Society of Ontario after a merger with neighboring Glengarry Pipe Band, also in grade 2.

In 2007 and 2018, the band opened for Rod Stewart at the British rock singer and songwriter's Ottawa concerts.

The band requested a downgrade to grade 2 for the 2019 season after a two-year hiatus, citing a drop in numbers after the departure of lead-drummer Brendan Kelly and pipe major Andrew Hayes.
