= Hamilton Caledonian Pipe Band =

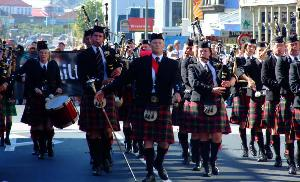
- Established: 1925
- Location: Hamilton, New Zealand
- Grade: 2
- Pipe major: Meleana Eade
- Drum sergeant: Timothy Dent
- Tartan: MacLennan
- Notable honours: Winners Grade 2 2005 & 2006
- Website: www.hamiltoncaledonian.org.nz

The Hamilton Caledonian Pipe Band otherwise known as The Callies is an organisation with two bands. One in grade "2" and one non-competing, with over 50 playing members based in Hamilton, New Zealand.

== About ==
The Hamilton Caledonian Society Pipe Band has seen exponential growth since its inception in 1925. There are currently two bands, one at a Grade 2 level and a second Non Competing band. The Number One band competes in Grade 2.

== History ==
The Hamilton Caledonian Pipe Band was originally formed as the South Auckland Caledonian Society in 1925, from an earlier organisation established in 1917. On 12 June 1928, the Band was incorporated as the Hamilton Caledonian Society.

Over the years, the Society has represented Scotland and its traditions through concerts, Inglesides, socials, choirs, marching teams, sports teams and its Pipe Band. One of the objects of the Society is to promote a greater appreciation of the pipes and to this end the Band have given great service to Hamilton and its surrounds.

The Band won the B Grade national contest at Palmerston North in 1938 under Pipe Major Sam Clothier. Consequently, the Band was promoted to the A Grade.

With the advent of World War II, the Waikato Mounted Rifles requested that the Band be attached to their unit. Parades for the various Home Guard, 4th Waikato Regiment and the Women's Army kept the band busy.

In 1947, the Band traveled to Wanganui and its first Dominion Contest since the beginning of the war. They won the A Grade aggregate for the quickstep and selection. The Band's profile lifted dramatically and requests for appearances flowed in from far and near. The Band retained its title at the following nationals in 1948, in Dunedin. In 1949, at New Plymouth, Hamilton won the street parade and quickstep but were second overall by one point.

After a few years break from attending national contests, in 1952 at Napier, the band were 4th overall in the A Grade, an impressive feat, considering the Band was the youngest ever taken to compete in that grade.

A significant milestone for the Society, was the opening of its own hall in Grey Street, Hamilton East in 1963.

In 1965, at Timaru, the Band again won the aggregate in the A Grade competition.

During the 1970s, the Society and Band saw declines in membership. As a result, the Band did not compete regularly at National Contests and lost their place in the top grades.

By 1980, under music director, Trevor Andrews, the band won the Grade 3 title at the Nationals in Hamilton. They were consequently promoted to Grade 2 which they won the following year, at Timaru. A second band was formed later that year.

By 1984, the number 1 band had been promoted once more to Grade 1. The Grey Street Hall was sold and in 1989, our present building in High Street was purchased.

Unfortunately, during the 1990s, the band began to struggle to retain members and agreed to go back to Grade 2. When the Te Rapa Air Force Base was closed, several of its members joined Hamilton Caledonian. Concern for the need to train up new playing members led to initiatives with local schools to tutor young pipers and drummers.

The band until recently comprised the Number One Band, which competed in Grade 1, the Number Two Band, which currently competes in Grade 2, The Number Three band competing in grade 4 and finally the Juvenile band who began competing in 2006.

The Number One Band has achieved three second placings in 1998, 1999 and 2001 in Grade 2, and went on to take out the grade two Championships in 2005 (in Invercargill) and 2006 (in Hamilton). As a result of this continued success, the Hamilton Cales were promoted to Grade 1 after their win in Hamilton 2006.

The Number Two Band was formed in 1999. They achieved 2nd placings in 2000 and 2001 and have been in the past promoted from Grade 4 to Grade 3.

The band currently has a Grade 2 and Non competing Band, led by Pipe Major Meleana Eade.

As well as competing nationally, the Band has performed at such events as Civic Functions, International Rugby matches, Sporting Parades, Christmas Parades, Race meetings, Special Olympics, university and Polytechnic Graduations, Concerts and other engagements.
