= Johnstone Pipe Band =

Scottish grade 1 pipe band

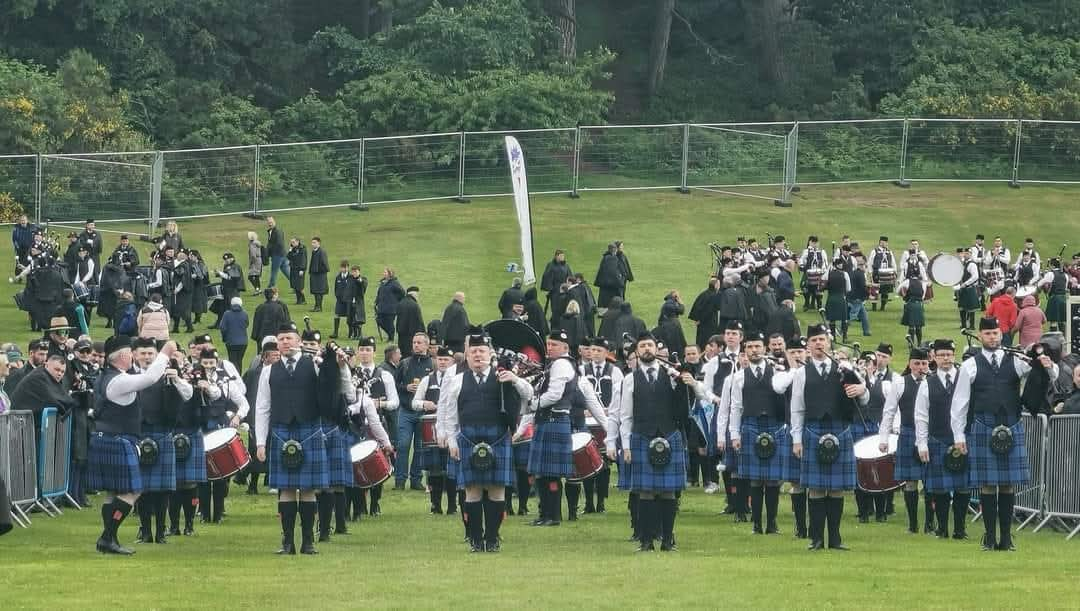
- Johnstone competing at the 2024 British Championships, Forres.
- Established: 1943
- Location: Johnstone
- Grade: 1
- Pipe major: Donald Mackay
- Drum sergeant: Gavin Orr
- Tartan: Blue Mackay
- Notable honours: Champion of Champions: 1980 (G4) Cowal Champions: 2000 (G3B) European Champions: 2015 (G2) Scottish Champions: 2007 (G3A) G2 World Champions: 2015 & 2016
- Website: www.johnstonepipeband.co.uk

Johnstone Pipe Band is a grade 1 competitive pipe band from Johnstone, Scotland which was established in 1943.

The band is famous for its progress where it has moved from Grade 4, right up to its current position in the premier Grade 1.

== History ==
Johnstone Pipe Band was founded by a former Provost of Johnstone Burgh, James Mackay, in 1943 and so wears the Blue Mackay tartan in recognition of its founder. Like most bands founded during the Second World War, their original purpose was to march the local Home Guard around the town.

The band has always regularly competed, the first record of competition was at the 1948 World Championships in Glasgow in 1948. Since then, it has enjoyed success in the other grades, in 1980, the band gained the Grade 4 Champion of Champions title.

In 1994, the band was regraded and Keith A. Bowes was appointed pipe major of the band. In 1998, the band enjoyed one of its most successful years, winning around 30 trophies across many local and major competitions. This led to promotion from Grade 4A to Grade 3B.

In 2000, the band won the Cowal Championships and was soon promoted after only two seasons in Grade 3B, to Grade 3A. During this time, the band started a youth programmes to help recruitment and commitment issues within the band, so in 2004, the band was regraded back to Grade 4A to help with the development of the first of the young people involved in its youth programme. This programme grew and in 2006, the band was able to launch a Novice Juvenile pipe band for their growing youth programme. In 2007, the adult band was promoted two grades up from Grade 4A to Grade 3A and won the Scottish Championships and placed at the rest of the year's major championships. Later in the year, the band was promoted to Grade 2. In 2012, Leslie Galbraith took over the drum corps as leading drummer.

After numerous years of success, Keith A Bowes stepped down as pipe major in 2015 and was succeeded by his son Keith J Bowes. Under Keith J Bowes, the band enjoyed competitive successes once again winning the 2015 European and World Championships and the 2016 World Championships, allowing them to be promoted from Grade 2 to the prestigious Grade 1.

In late 2022, Keith J Bowes stepped down as pipe major of the band and was succeeded by Donald Mackay, a former pipe major of the Strathclyde Police Pipe Band. Keith J Bowes remains with the band as its Pipe Sergeant. Also in 2022, Leslie Galbraith stood down as leading drummer and was succeeded by Gavin Orr.

== Learner's Programme ==
The band has a successful learner class which began in 2004 to teach piping and drumming. The class meet at the band's hall in Johnstone. As part of the classes, learners can take part in the Piping and Drumming Qualifications Board courses which aim to boost their ability. These courses are a partnership between the National Piping Centre, RSPBA, Army School of Piping and Drumming, Piobaireachd Society and the Tri Service Cadet Centre where many of the qualifications that can be achieved are accredited by the Scottish Qualifications Authority.

== Leadership ==
=== Pipe Majors ===
Little information known about Pipe Majors before 1994.

- Keith A Bowes (1994 - 2014)
- Keith J Bowes (2014 - 2022)
- Donald Mackay (2022 - present)

=== Leading Drummers ===
Little information known about Leading Drummers before 2012.

- Leslie Galbraith (2012 - 2022)
- Gavin Orr (2022 - present)

== Discography ==
- Johnstone Pipe Band - 1999
