= Alberta Caledonia Pipe Band =

Canadian pipe band

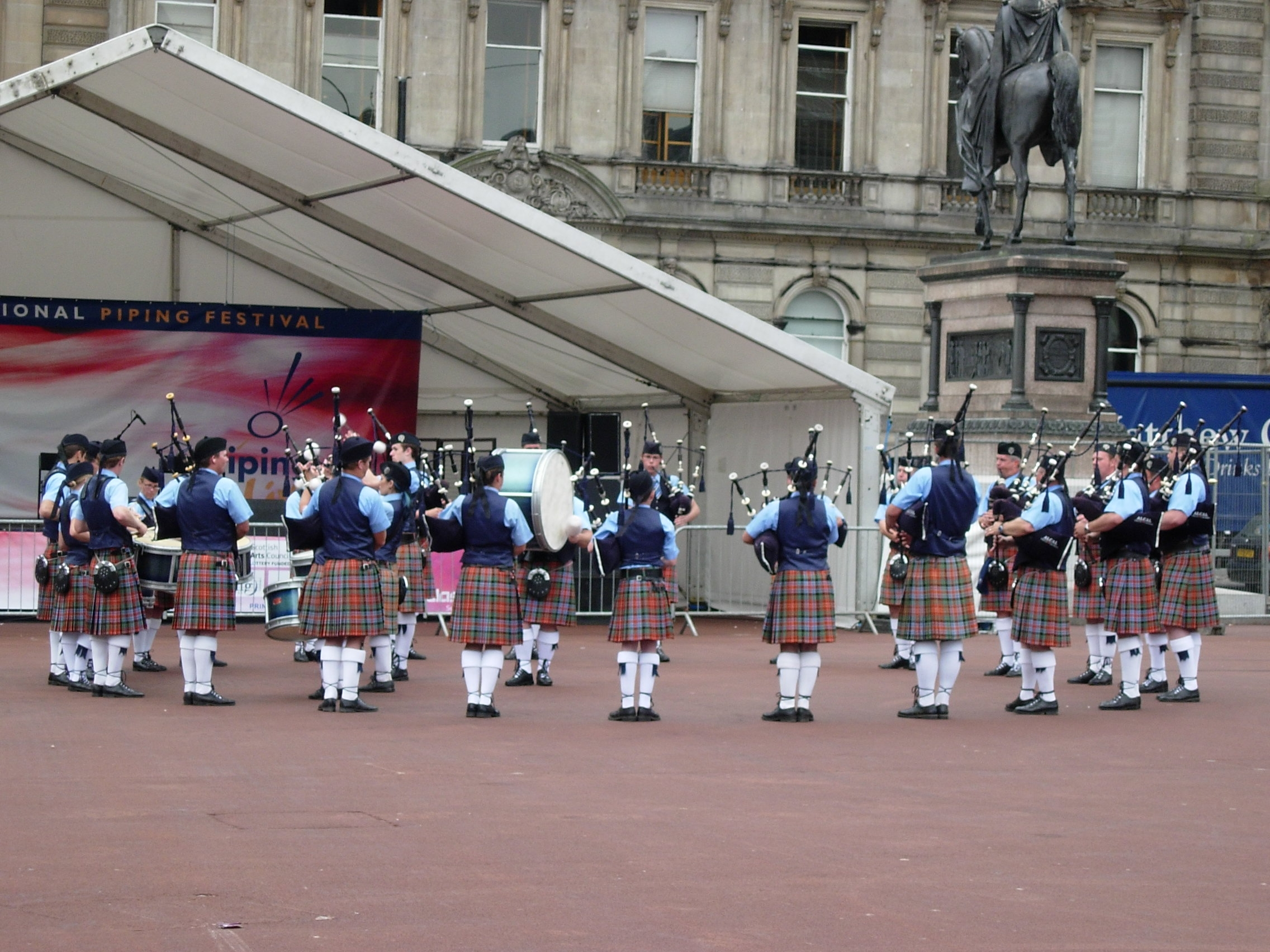
- Established: 1982
- Location: Edmonton/Calgary, Alberta
- Grade: 1
- Pipe major: Andrew Smith
- Drum sergeant: Andrew Miller
- Tartan: Ancient Caledonia
- Notable honours: World Pipe Band Championships 2001: 7th Place

The Alberta Caledonia Pipe Band was a competitive grade 1 pipe band based out of Calgary and Edmonton, Alberta, Canada.

== History ==
The group was originally established in Edmonton in 1982, as the Grade 1 Edmonton Caledonia Pipe Band. The band's name was changed in the mid 1990s, after it received a large influx of players from Calgary; the band was then based out of both cities.

In 2000, they began attending the annual World Pipe Band Championships and, in 2001, placed 7th in the grade 1 finals. The group was one of the top competitive pipe bands in both Canada and the world.

The band recorded two CDs, They Took Their Leave in 1998 and Another Round in 2005.

In 2013, key members of the pipe section leave to pursue their careers elsewhere and the band decided to fold as it was not able to field a competition band at the Grade 1 level.

The Edmonton group of players came back together in 2015 to start the new grade 2 local band North Stratton Pipe Band. The Calgary players joined the Grade 2 Rocky Mountain Pipe Band.
