= Pipes & Drums of the Royal Caledonian Society =

Australian pipe band

Pipes and Drums of the Royal Caledonian Society
- Established: 1894
- Location: Adelaide, Australia
- Grade: 4
- Pipe major: Dan Meehan
- Tartan: Red McGregor
- Website: https://pdrcs.wordpress.com/

The Pipes & Drums of The Royal Caledonian Society of South Australia were first established in 1894 and are based in the City of Adelaide, South Australia. The pipe band plays at many community and private functions such as street parades, Christmas pageants and weddings. The band has also performed at the Royal Edinburgh Military Tattoo in Edinburgh in 2001, 2007, and most recently in 2011, and the Basel Tattoo in 2013, and has performed at the Australian hosted Edinburgh Military Tattoos in 2005 and 2010.

== History ==
What started out over a hundred years ago in the City of Adelaide as "The Pipers Band" is now commonly acknowledged as one of the most recognised pipe bands in South Australia and the oldest civilian Pipe Band in the southern hemisphere. It is also one of the oldest civilian pipe bands in the world.

In approximately 1912 the band became known as The Caledonian Pipe Band. In 1946, King George VI granted permission to the society to use the prefix ‘Royal’ in recognition and mainly due to the untiring efforts and devoted services of the society's pipe band members. Many served during the Boer War, World War I, and with numerous receiving decorations for their part in conflicts during World War II.

From that point the band became known, as they are today, as The Pipes and Drums of the Royal Caledonian Society.

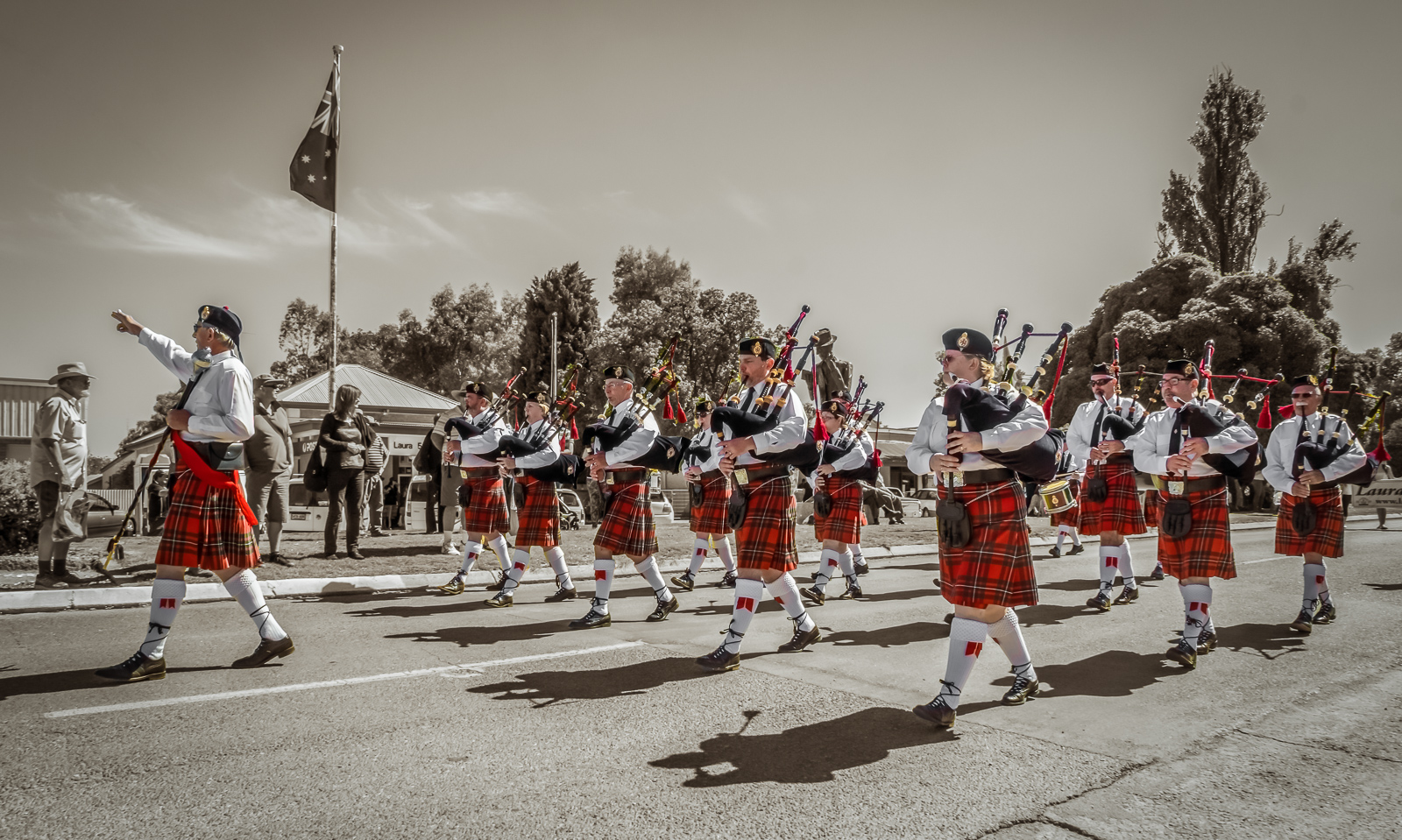
Pipes and Drums of the Royal Caledonian Society of South Australia, performing at the Laura Folk Fair 2015.
