= Antwerp & District Pipe Band =

Belgian pipe band

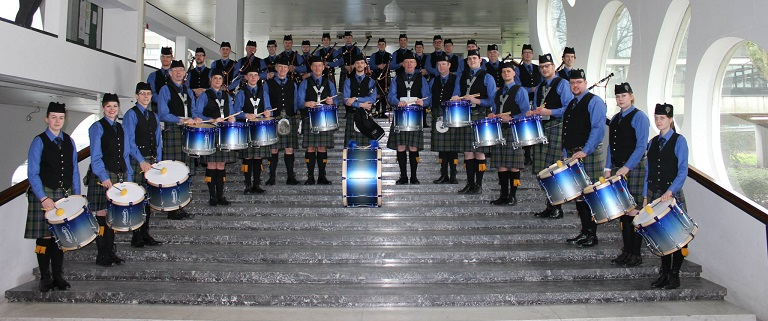
- Established: 1978
- Location: Antwerp, Belgium
- Grade: 3A
- Pipe major: Dries Papen
- Drum sergeant: Robby Moring
- Tartan: Cameron of Erracht
- Notable honours: 1980: 4th place grade 4, Cowal highland Games, Dunoon (Sco), Glasgow (Sco), 2002: 2nd place ex aequo grade 3A, Cowal Games, Dunoon (Sco), 2010: 2nd place grade 3A British Championships, Annan (Sco)
- Website: www.adpb.be

The Antwerp & District Pipe Band is Belgium's leading pipe band, it's also the first ever grade two band in Belgium which it became after becoming second at the British Championships in Annan.

== History ==
The Antwerp & District Pipe Band is Belgium's leading pipe band. The band was founded in 1978, when a group of enthousistic musicians wanted to achieve a higher musical level and left the Red Hackle Pipe Band Belgium to start a competition-oriented band. In the first years of its existence the band was led by pipe major Ludo Thijssen and leading drummer Peter Vandeperre. In 1980, only two years after the foundation, the first successes came with a 4th place at one of the world's biggest pipe band championships, the Cowal Highland Gathering. As a result, the band was promoted to grade 3. In the next thirty years, the band played at a top grade 3 level.

In 1988, the band started competing with two bands (a grade 3 and a grade 4 band), to improve the musical level. Andrew Tierney led the B-band to the top of grade 4 (Nowadays it is known as the Belgian Blend Pipe Band, and was recently promoted to grade 3b). In 1990, Andrew took over from Ludo Thijssen and became pipe major of the Antwerp & District Pipe Band until 2002, leaving the band in the hands of Thomas Kerkhof. Between 1999 and 2003, the band changed its name to Mühl Pipes & Drums and wore the Rangers FC tartan. These changes were a result of a sponsorship from the German company Mühl.

In 2009, the band felt it was time for another make-over, and swapped its distinctive blue Rangers kilt for the one they still wear today: Cameron of Erracht.

In 2010, the band (under musical direction of pipe major Stephen Tierney and leading drummer Jan de Beuckelaer), achieved a second place at the British Championships in Annan, Scotland. After thirty years in grade three (and later 3A), the band was once more promoted, this time to grade 2.

== Band Members 2014 ==
The members travel many miles for band practice and competitions. The Antwerp & District Pipe Band is also a very international band, with players from the Netherlands, Scotland, Canada, Germany and France. Some of the members have also played in various grade 1 bands or left the band to play with them.

Pipers:

- Peter Hyndrikx (Pipe Major)
- Thomas Kerkhof (Pipe Sergeant)
- Marco De Clercq
- Ruben De Clercq
- Johan De Meulenaere
- Jimmy Devolder
- Lennerd Dubois
- Steff Geerts
- Christian Grammel
- Jan Guretzke
- Michel Lavolé
- Thijs Martens
- Ann Margaret McCuaig
- Dries Papen
- Maggy Schmitz
- Kurt Somers
- Andrew Tierney
- Gert-Jan Van Achterbergh
- Caroline Van Geeteruyen
- Dennis Van Meel
- Stijn Van Wesepoel

Drummers:

- Jan De Beuckelaer (Leading Drummer)
- Marc Blockx
- Sara De Meulemeester
- Sietse Gorisssen
- Marcel Herrmann
- Carel Ooms
- Jan-Philipp Stolz
- Job Van Duijnhoven
- Seppe Verwimp
- Mario Bronius (bass)
- Willy Papen (bass)
- Jörg Bleidt (tenor)
- Carina Bleidt (tenor)
- Vicki Bronius (tenor)
- Frauke Dubois (tenor)
- Nils Duchene (tenor)
- Jan Martens (tenor)
- Sebastian Renner (tenor)
- Anse Rubbens (tenor)
- Dimitri Van Bogaert (tenor)

Drone tuner:

- Frank Dubois

== Pipe Majors ==
1978–1988	P/M Ludo Thijssen
1988–2002	P/M Andrew Tierney
2002–2007	P/M Thomas Kerkhof
2007–2011	P/M Stephen Tierney
2011–present	P/M Peter Hyndrikx

== Notable former members ==
- Ludo Thijssen: founding pipe-major of the band.
- Olav Goud: moved to Scotland to play with the Polkemmet Pipe Band, the Lothian & Borders Police Pipe Band, the Strathclyde Police Pipe Band, and the Boghall and Bathgate Caledonia Pipe Band.
- René Frederiksen: played with the 6-times world champions, the Simon Fraser University Pipe Band.
- Robbert Van Gorp: played with the Lothian & Borders Police Pipe Band from 2004-2006 and was a member of the Peoples Ford Boghall and Bathgate Caledonia Pipe Band between 2009 and 2023. He has won various RSBPA major championships + all major drum corps titles including the World Drumming Title in 2012 at the World Pipe Band Championship, and the RSPBA champion of champion drum corps prize in both 2010 and 2012 under the leadership of LD Gordon J. Brown. Robbert was a member of the band in 2023, where they won both the UK Championships as a band and the World Pipe Band Championships in grade 1. It was the same year when 19 year old Leading Drummer, Kerr McQuillan took over. After the 2023 season, Robbert retired as an active band member and is currently only teaching and judging.

- Thomas Kerkhof: played with the old Dysart and Dundonald Pipe Band before he became pipe major of the band. After a couple of years, Thomas started practising with the Shotts and Dykehead Pipe Band.
