= New Zealand Police Pipe Band =

New Zealand pipe band

- Location: Wellington, New Zealand
- Grade: 2
- Pipe major: Adam Tonkin
- Drum sergeant: NA
- Notable honours: New Zealand Champions 2007. Seven times previous NZ Grade One Champions, Australian Grade One Champions 1988, and previous top ten placings at World Championship level.
- Website: http://www.nzpolicepipeband.com/...

The New Zealand Police Pipe Band is a Grade 2 pipe band based in Wellington, New Zealand.

== History ==
The group was originally formed as the Wellington Police Highland Pipe Band in 1936 by Detective Sergeant Neil McPhee in Wellington. The name was changed to New Zealand Police Pipe Band in 1994 to better reflect its role representing New Zealand Police.

The Band has forty police and civilian members, and plays around the globe at World Competitions, and locally at community events. The Band is based at the Royal New Zealand Police College.

The Band has won the New Zealand Grade One Championship on eight occasions. The first win being in 1992 at Napier, and most recently the 2018 Championships held in Rotorua.

The New Zealand Police Pipe Band has attained respectable results in its forays to compete against the World's best bands in Scottish, Irish and North American contests. The band has travelled to the World Championships on numerous occasions, most recently the 2016 competition in Glasgow, where they qualified for the grade 1 finals. The band also has a high profile domestically, competing in numerous competitions around the country whenever possible.

The Band was regraded to Grade 2 in 2025.
