= Manawatu Scottish Pipe Band =

New Zealand pipe band

- Established: 1925
- Location: Palmerston North, New Zealand
- Grade: 1
- Pipe major: Stewart McKenzie
- Drum sergeant: Gary Potter
- Tartan: Clan Cameron
- Website: www.manawatuscottish.co.nz

The Manawatu Scottish Pipe Band is a Grade One pipe band based in Palmerston North, New Zealand. The band is led by Pipe Major Stewart McKenzie and Drum Sergeant Gary Potter.

== History ==
The band was established in 1925 and is based in Palmerston North, New Zealand.

The band has a close affiliation with Manawatu Scottish Society, extending back to when the band was first formed.

== Band ==
The band organisation comprises a Grade One band, a Grade Three band, a Grade 4 development band, supporters club and an administrative body. It is New Zealand's largest pipe organisation, with more than 110 members.

It performs at an average of 45 community events each year.

== Discography ==
- The Calling (2002)
- Twelve Thousand Miles (2009)
