= Coastal Scottish Pipe Band =

Australian pipe band

- Established: 1898
- Location: Western Australia
- Grade: 3
- Pipe major: Hamish Cotton
- Drum sergeant: John Christensen
- Tartan: Ancient MacLaine of Lochbuie
- Notable honours: 1st place, New Zealand Pipe Band Championships: 2007 (Grade 4); 1st place, Western Australian Pipe Band Championships: 2007 (Grades 3 & 4)
- Website: www.coastalscottish.org

Coastal Scottish Pipe Band, often known simply as Coastals, is a grade 3 pipe band based in Perth, Western Australia. The band was formed in 1898, and along with the City of Melbourne Highland Pipe Band is one of the oldest pipe bands in Australia. The current band organisation comprises both a grade 3 and a grade 4 band.

== History ==
The Coastal Scottish Pipe Band was formed in 1898 by a group of expatriate Scottish men working at the old Fremantle Railway Workshops. As one of the only pipe bands in Western Australia at this time the band called themselves 'The Gay Gordons' and adopted the Gordon tartan in their uniform.

As early as 1901 it had become known as the Coastal Scottish Pipe Band., however many references after that date still called it the Fremantle Gordon Pipe Band.

Their first competition entered was at the WACA Ground in 1929. An event which was, among other festivities, organised to coincide with the Centenary of Western Australia.

The economic depression of the coming years was to have quite a large impact on the band. In the years following World War II, Coastals regained its full strength and by the 1950s and 60s the band was actively performing at many notable social turnouts including the first visit to WA in 1954 by the newly crowned Queen Elizabeth II and the Duke of Edinburgh.

It was also around this time that Bon Scott, who went on to become the front man for the Australian Hard Rock band AC/DC, was a snare drummer with the band.

In 1975, the band was renamed the City of South Perth Pipe Band and also adopted the Ancient MacLaine of Lochbuie clan tartan, which continues to be part of the current uniform. It was also in the coming years that the band produced the first known recording of Pipe Band music in Western Australia.

In 2001, the City of South Perth council reviewed their sponsorship of the band, and on 28 August of the same year the band officially readopted their former name "Coastal Scottish Pipe Band WA".

Since this time the band has had success at both state and international levels of competition. The most notable achievement in the bands short term history was winning first place in Grade 4 at the 2007 New Zealand Pipe Band championships. The band was awarded first place in the MSR, Musical Selection, Drumming, and Street March (Music), thereby winning the overall Grade 4 competition and trophies. In 2009, the band travelled to Glasgow, Scotland, to compete at the World Pipe Band Championships. Most recently in 2012, Coastals travelled to Ballarat, Victoria to compete in the Australian National Pipe Band Championships.

As of early October 2008, the APBA WA branch upgraded Coastals to Grade 3.
