= Scottish Highland Gathering and Games =

Annual games in California, US

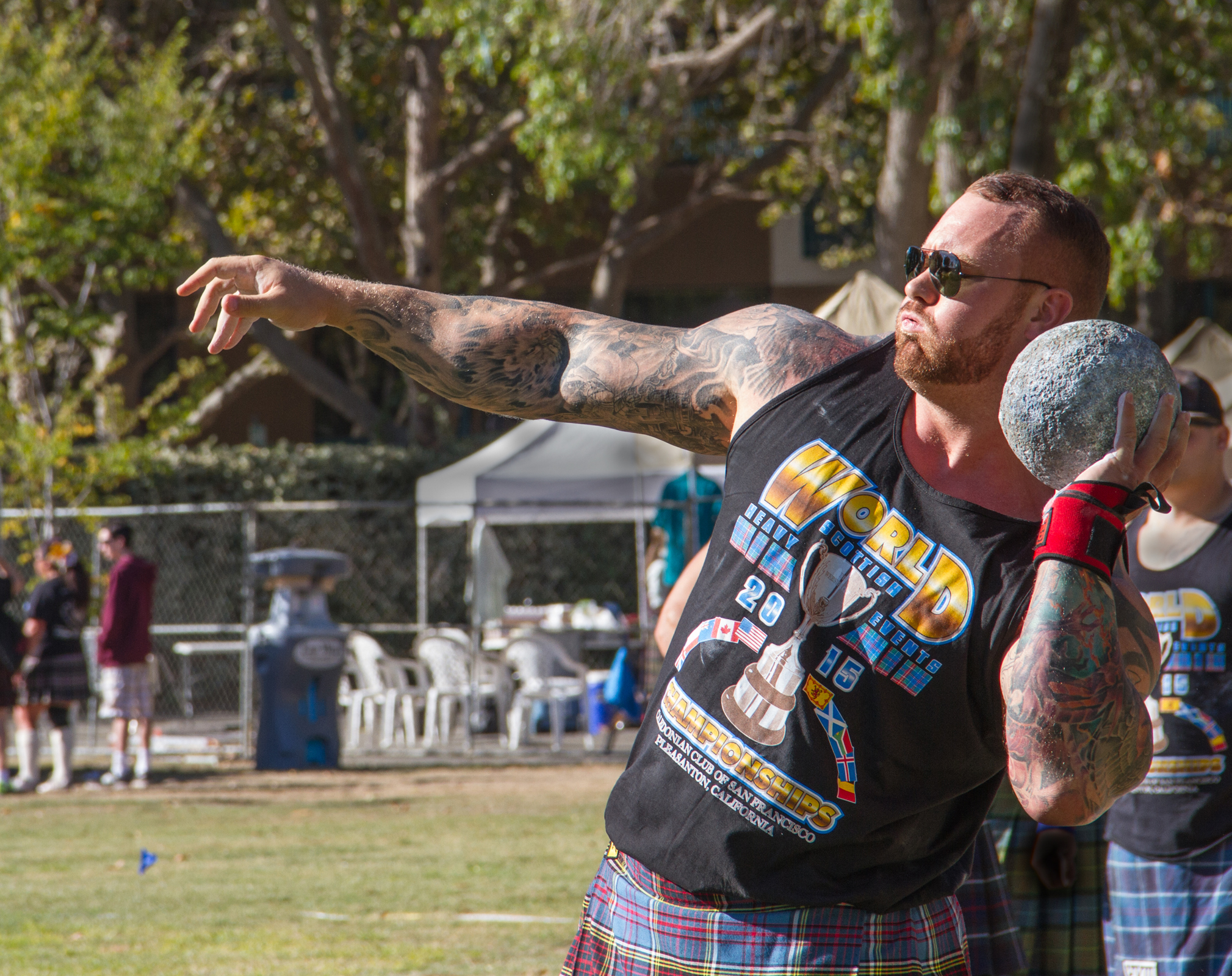
- Hafþór Júlíus Björnsson competing in the stone put at the 150th anniversary games in 2015
- Status: Active
- Genre: Highland games
- Frequency: Annual (Labor Day weekend)
- Venue: Alameda County Fairgrounds
- Location: Pleasanton, California
- Country: United States
- Inaugurated: 1866
- Founder: Caledonian Club of San Francisco
- Attendance: 30,000+
- Organiser: Caledonian Club of San Francisco
- Website: thescottishgames.com

The Scottish Highland Gathering and Games hosted by the Caledonian Club of San Francisco are held every year on Labor Day weekend at the Alameda County Fairgrounds in Pleasanton, California.

The event has been held annually since 1866, continuing through the 1906 San Francisco earthquake, the Great Depression, and both World Wars, with its only interruption in 2020 due to the COVID-19 pandemic. It is described as the oldest and one of the largest Highland games in the United States, with the 150th anniversary in 2015 attracting a record crowd estimated at close to 50,000.

The two-day gathering features tradition Scottish competitions in heavy athletics, piping and drumming, Highland dancing, and other traditional events, including Celtic music, cultural exhibitions, and clan gatherings. The event is produced entirely by volunteers from the Caledonian Club and regularly draws over 30,000 attendees.

== History ==
The Caledonian Club of San Francisco was founded in November 1866 for the; "Encouragement and practice of the games, and preservation of the customs and manners of Scotland, and a promotion of a taste for her literature, music, etc.". Described as "a family picnic with athletic contests", the Caledonian Club's first Scottish Games were held on Thanksgiving Day, November 30, 1866 at Hayes Park, on Laguna and Hayes Streets in San Francisco, The following year's gathering was held at "the White House at the terminus of the Market Street Railroad."

As the event grew, it migrated to various venues around the San Francisco Bay Area. In 1868, the club's third anniversary celebration was held in Sausalito, drawing nearly 4,000 people for a day of Highland games, bagpipe competitions, and dancing; the event was reported as far away as London. By the 1870s, the venue had shifted to Badger's Park in Oakland, where the gathering was held into the early 1880s. Around 1884, the games moved to Shell Mound Park in Emeryville, where they remained until 1922.

After two years at Idora Park in Oakland, the gathering moved in 1926 to California Park near San Rafael, operated by the Siebe family, where it was held on the Fourth of July for over a decade. By 1949, the event had moved to the San Rafael Military Academy and settled on Labor Day weekend. The following year it moved to the Petaluma Fairgrounds.

In 1962, the games relocated to the Sonoma County Fairgrounds in Santa Rosa, and then in 1994, having outgrown that venue, to the Alameda County Fairgrounds in Pleasanton, where it has been held ever since.

Fairgrounds management attributed the record attendance at the 150th edition in 2015 to the milestone anniversary and a guest appearance by Hafþór Júlíus Björnsson of HBO's Game of Thrones.

A heat wave in 2017 brought temperatures at the fairgrounds to 115 °F (46 °C). After the 2020 cancellation, the games returned in 2021 with attendance capped at 5,000 by health officials. Another heat wave struck the 2022 games, prompting organizers to set up cooling tents and misters and open air-conditioned buildings across the fairgrounds.

== Competitions ==
=== Heavy Athletics ===
Scottish heavy athletics have been part of the Games since their founding in 1866. They have hosted the annual U.S. Invitational Heavy Athletics Championships since 1975 and have periodically hosted the World Scottish Heavy Events Championships for both men and women. The competitions draw both professional and amateur athletes from across the United States and internationally, with events including the caber toss, hammer throw, and stone put. Notable winners of the US Invitational at Pleasanton include Ryan Vierra, who won the championship six times, and Dan McKim, who won in 2013. Spencer Tyler set field records in the 28-pound weight for distance and the weight over the bar while winning the professional class in 2018.

After Shannon Hartnett of Sausalito persuaded organizers to open heavy athletics to women, she went on to win 13 US titles and 10 consecutive world championships before retiring at the 2005 games. The Games hosted the Women's Scottish Heavy Athletics World Championships in 2023 and 2025.

=== Piping and Drumming ===
Bagpipe competitions have been part of the games since at least the 1868 celebration in Sausalito. The games feature competitions for pipe bands and solo pipers and drummers across multiple grade levels, sanctioned by the Western United States Pipe Band Association (WUSPBA). Pleasanton serves as the primary qualifying competition in the WUSPBA's jurisdiction, with overall winners qualifying for invitations to the Western States Champion Solo Invitational.

In 1950, the Vancouver Ladies Pipe Band became the first women's pipe band to compete at the games. Solo piping and drumming entries reached a record of more than 200 in 2025. Pipe bands from across the United States and Canada typically compete (29 in 2013 and 35 in 2019), and the 150th anniversary games in 2015 drew the Triumph Street Pipe Band and Greater Glasgow Police Scotland pipe bands as Grade I competitors alongside the Los Angeles Scots. Each day concludes with a massed bands performance during the closing ceremony.

=== Highland Dancing ===
Highland dancing has been part of the games since at least 1924. The Western United States Open Highland Dancing Championships, established in 1962, are sanctioned by the Royal Scottish Official Board of Highland Dancing (RSOBHD) and held as part of the games. Competitors perform traditional dances including the Highland Fling, sword dance, Seann triubhas, and the Sailor's Hornpipe.

=== Other Competitions ===
The games also include a kilted mile footrace run on the Fairgrounds' historic one-mile horse track, and soccer competitions. Sheepdog trials, organized by the Northern California Working Sheepdog Association, have been held as part of the games since 1996. Shinty was introduced to the games in 2008; the following year, the Northern California Camanachd club hosted Skye Camanachd at Pleasanton in the first international shinty match on United States soil.

== Culture and entertainment ==
Beyond competitive events, the gathering features Celtic rock and traditional folk music on multiple stages throughout the fairgrounds. A living history exhibition features historical reenactments, period crafts, military demonstrations, and a portrayal of Mary, Queen of Scots.

The Gathering of the Clans brings together representatives of dozens of Scottish clans, offering visitors information about Scottish heritage and genealogy. Other attractions have included whisky tasting, birds of prey demonstrations, Clydesdale horses, Highland cattle, historic British cars, and Scottish country dancing. Vendors offer traditional Scottish fare and Celtic goods.

The games support the American Friends of Erskine, established in 2003 as the Caledonian Club's nominated charity, which raises funds for Scotland's Erskine veterans charity.

== See also ==
- Prince Charles Pipe Band
- Grandfather Mountain Highland Games

== Sources ==
- "About Highland Games". Scotland.org.
- "Scottish Games returning to Pleasanton". Pleasanton Weekly. August 28, 2018.
- "Scottish Games Draw Record Crowds". The Independent. September 2015.
- "Caledonian Club of San Francisco Presents the 150th Highland Games". Transceltic.com. September 3, 2015.
- "Kick up your heels". DanvilleSanRamon.com. August 30, 2013.
- "160th Scottish Highland Gathering & Games". thescottishgames.com.
- "History of the Games". thescottishgames.com.
- "Scottish Games — The Caledonian Club will hold its Second Annual Gathering". Daily Alta California. November 28, 1867.
- "The Caledonians". Daily Alta California. May 23, 1875.
- "Caledonian Club". Daily Alta California. May 25, 1884.
- "57th Grand Annual Gathering and Games, Caledonian Club of San Francisco, Shellmound". Organized Labor. May 27, 1922 – via California Digital Newspaper Collection.
- "Caledonian Club Sets Annual Picnic Date". Sacramento Daily Union. June 2, 1939.
- "Spartans Enter Caledonian Races". Petaluma Argus Courier. July 2, 1940.
- "Scottish Highland Gathering and Games Will Return to Pleasanton's Alameda County Fairgrounds on Weekend". The Independent. August 28, 2025.
- "159th Scottish Highland Games & Gathering roars into Pleasanton Labor Day weekend". Tri-City Voice. August 26, 2025.
- "Kilts and swords galore: 2022 Scottish Games celebrated in Pleasanton". Pleasanton Weekly. September 6, 2022.
- "148th Scottish Highland Gathering & Games on again today at Pleasanton Fairgrounds". Pleasanton Weekly. August 30, 2013.
- "Pleasanton Scottish Games: A guide to haggis, kilts and clans". The Mercury News. August 31, 2017.
- "Scottish Highland Gathering and Games back in Pleasanton for Labor Day weekend". Pleasanton Weekly. August 26, 2019.
- "'05 Pleasanton: Shannon Hartnett's Last Games". IronMind.com. July 29, 2005.
- "158th Scottish Highland Gathering & Games". Hacienda.org. August 16, 2024.
- "156th Scottish Highland Gathering and Games". Hacienda.org. August 29, 2022.
- "The plaid is back". Pleasanton Weekly. August 26, 2021.
- "156th Scottish Highland Gathering and Games returns to Alameda County Fairgrounds under scorching weekend heat". ABC7 News. September 4, 2022.
- "Scottish Games: Pleasanton hosting bagpipes, kilts, cabers and a castle Labor Day weekend". Pleasanton Weekly. August 26, 2025.
- Jordan, Robert (August 30, 2008). "Shinty premieres at Scottish fest in Pleasanton". San Mateo County Times. Archived from the original on March 3, 2016.
- "Thursday's Scottish gossip". BBC Sport. August 20, 2009. Archived from the original on September 3, 2023.
- "Caledonian Club of San Francisco Scottish Games and Gathering – sanctioned". Western United States Pipe Band Association. August 30, 2024.
- "Facing 12 fewer games and festivals, WUSPBA creates smaller events and Western States Invitational". drums. March 11, 2025.
- "2025 CCSF (Pleasanton)". ScotDance Sacramento. 2025.
- "Scottish Games in Pleasanton". 510 Families. August 26, 2025.
- "Scots Club to Hold 65th Meet At California Park, July 4th". Sausalito News. June 27, 1930 – via California Digital Newspaper Collection.
- "Canadian Women's Pipe Band to Play at Caledonian Games". Healdsburg Tribune, Enterprise and Scimitar. August 31, 1950 – via California Digital Newspaper Collection.
- "Ladies' Pipe Band To Come Here For Scotch Gathering". Petaluma Argus Courier. August 24, 1950 – via California Digital Newspaper Collection.
- "Scottish Games Set for Sept. 2 at Fairgrounds". Geyserville Press. August 24, 1962 – via California Digital Newspaper Collection.
- "Caledonian Club to Have Outing Sept. 10". San Francisco Chronicle. August 6, 1923. p. 4.
- "59th annual gathering and games of the Caledonian Club at Idora Park". San Francisco Chronicle. June 21, 1924. p. 19.
- "Caledonian Club's 84th Gathering". San Francisco Chronicle. August 28, 1949. p. 3.
- "Dan McKim Wins at Pleasanton". IronMind.com. September 2, 2013.
- "Pleasanton Power: CCSF Hosts Record-Setting Highland Games". IronMind.com. September 5, 2018.
- "Small triumphs at Pleasanton". pipes|drums. September 6, 2015.
