= New York Maritime Pipe and Drum Corps =

American pipe band

New York Maritime Regimental Pipe & Drum Corps
- Established: 2004
- Location: Fort Schuyler, NY
- Grade: Non Competing as of 2007
- Pipe major: Cdt. Brendan Ross 2/C
- Drum sergeant: Cdt. Michael Brandt 1/C
- Tartan: MacMillan Hunting Modern

The New York Maritime Regimental Pipe & Drum Corps is a pipe band made up of officers and cadets of the SUNY Maritime College located in Fort Schuyler, New York. New York Maritime is one of only two pipe bands representing the United States Merchant Marine, the other being the Maine Maritime Pipe & Drum Corps.

== History ==
The band was formed in August 2004 as the New York Maritime Pipe & Drum Corps, by several members of the class of 2008 overseen by their Advisors Lt. Michael Brady, USMS and the college chaplain, CAPT. Michael Moynihan, USNR. Unable to compete due to lack of equipment, and trained personnel P/MAJ Michael Burns and P/SGT Kevin O'Brien set about training cadets in highland piping. By the summer of 2005 the band was able to field several pipers and begin to support the regiment and the college with its functions. In 2007, Brendan Patrick Ross, Xaverian High School class of 2007, class of 2011 SUNY Maritime, joined forces with Jack Timmel 2009, Michael Burns 2008 and Kevin O’Brien 2008, enlisting the help of Pipe Major Billy Treanor, Yonkers Fire Department Pipes and Drums Corps and Kevin Corrigan, NYS Courts Pipe band forming a great highland bagpipe and snare drum instructor. In early spring 2009 they also received help from Thomas Maloney, Iona College Pipe Band, with drum instruction. In fall 2009 Bobby Paolillo, Xaverian High School 2009, joined the ranks as Pipe Sergeant. The band has played at many functions in the past, such as: the re-opening ceremony of the Intrepid, Foreign Commerce Club, International Maritime functions, Bronx Chamber of Commerce, christening of ships within the military, United States Coast Guard conferences, Veteran’s Day Parade NYC, Saint Patrick’s Day parades across the tri-state.

The band has continued to serve the Regiment and the college by providing musical support during parades, the Cadet Indoctrination period, graduation ceremonies, funerals, memorial services, formal dinners, as well as other functions. The band was able to march in its first New York City St. Patrick's Day Parade in 2007 as guest pipers of the New York State Fraternal Order of Police Irish Warpipe Band.

== List of officers ==
Pipe Section

Pipe Majors

- Michael R. Burns (2004–2008)
- John Timmel (2008–2009)
- Brendan Ross (2009–2012)

Pipe Sergeants

- Kevin O'Brien (2004–2008)
- Brendan Ross (2008–2009)
- Bobby Paolillo (2009–Present)

Pipe Corporals

- John Timmel (2006–2008)
- Thomas Mahoney (2008–2009)

Drum Section

Drum Majors

- Paul Burgess (2004–2006)
- Peter Glynn Acting (2006)
- Matthew Gerfin (2007–2008)
- Michael Brandt (2008–Present)

Drum Sergeants

- Simon Russel (2006–2007)
- Patrick Walsh (2007–Present)
