= Scottish Pipe Band Association of South America =

The Scottish Pipe Band Association of South America (SPBASA), is a continental pipe band association currently comprising bands from Argentina, Brazil, Chile and Uruguay. It approved its first constitution on December 20, 2003, in Buenos Aires, Argentina; and was officially inaugurated on April 17, 2004, at the First South American Pipe Band Gathering in Montevideo, Uruguay. The comparatively low number of pipe bands and the number of countries encompassed are the principal reasons behind this pipe band association being so unique.

SPBASA liaises with multiple organizations, such as the Alliance of North American Pipe Band Associations (ANAPBA), the Royal Edinburgh Military Tattoo, the Royal Scottish Pipe Band Association, the Pan American Piobaireachd Society, local St. Andrew's Societies, local British associations, and others.

Association members can be full or associated, the former having the right to vote.

== Full members ==
Argentina

- Bariloche Highlanders Pipe Band
- Highland Thistle Pipe Band
- South American Piping Association Pipe Band

Brazil

- Brasil Caledonia Pipe Band
- St. Andrew's Society of São Paulo Pipes and Drums

Chile

- Andes Highlanders Pipe Band
- Chilean Highlands Pipes and Drums

Uruguay

- City of Montevideo Pipe Band
- Riverside Pipe Band

== Associated members ==
Argentina

- Buenos Aires Tartan Army
- Eamonn Bulfin Legacy Pipe Band
- Mendoza Highlanders
- St. Andrew's Society of the River Plate Pipe Band

Brazil

- Brazilian Piper
- Wolney Highlanders

Chile

- The Soul of Desert Pipe Band

Uruguay

- Latitude 33 Pipe Band

== Pipe Band Gatherings ==
The South American Pipe Band Gatherings have been the Association's most iconic and comprehensive events. These Gatherings, hosted by member pipe bands themselves on a rotational basis, occur approximately, every two years. The first, organised by Riverside Pipe Band, took place in Montevideo, Uruguay, in 2004. Gatherings are typically opened by a Massed Bands Parade along a major city avenue, including all participating pipe bands and guests. The Gatherings have hosted pipe band shows, pipe band competitions and soloist competitions. Piping, drumming and highland dancing celebrities have been invited to each Gathering as instructors and competition adjudicators.

The updated schedule of past and future Gatherings is published on the SPBASA website.

== Management ==
SPBASA's decisions are ruled by a Board formed by a representative of each member pipe band, and (where relevant) a representative of each country's independent pipers and drummers.

As from 2016, SPBASA is run by an Executive Committee composed of the President, Vice President, Secretary, Treasurer, Music Officer and Marketing Officer, whose terms last two years. The President is voted at the association's Annual General Meeting and selects the Officers of the Executive Committee.

=== Association Presidents ===
- 2016-2023 Michael Flight
- 2024-2027 Richard Empson

== Translations ==
"Scottish Pipe Band Association of South America", is officially translated into Spanish as "Asociación Sudamericana de Bandas de Gaitas Escocesas", and into Portuguese as "Associação Sulamericana de Bandas Escocesas".
