= Stuart Highlanders =

- Established: 1964
- Grade: 1
- Website: www.stuarthighlanders.com

The Stuart Highlanders is a pipe band based in Massachusetts, competing in Grade 4 which formerly also had a Grade 1 band.

The Grade 1 band had been Grade 2, and was promoted to Grade 1 in 2014 after merging with the Oran Mor Pipe Band.
