= Canterbury Caledonian Society Pipe Band =

Pipe band in Christchurch, New Zealand

- Location: Christchurch, New Zealand
- Grade: 1
- Pipe major: Jamie Hawke
- Drum sergeant: Michael Jenkins
- Tartan: Royal Stewart
- Notable honours: 2012, 2013, 2014, 2015, 2016, 2017, 2019, 2020, 2021, 2023, 2024 National New Zealand Pipe Band & Drum Corps Championships
- Website: https://www.canterburycaledonian.org.nz/grade-1-pipe-band

The Canterbury Caledonian Society Pipe Band is a grade one pipe band based in Christchurch, New Zealand.

The band's Pipe Major is Jamie Hawke; lead drummer is Michael Jenkins.
