= Worcester Kiltie Pipe Band =

Pipe Band from Worcester, Massachusetts

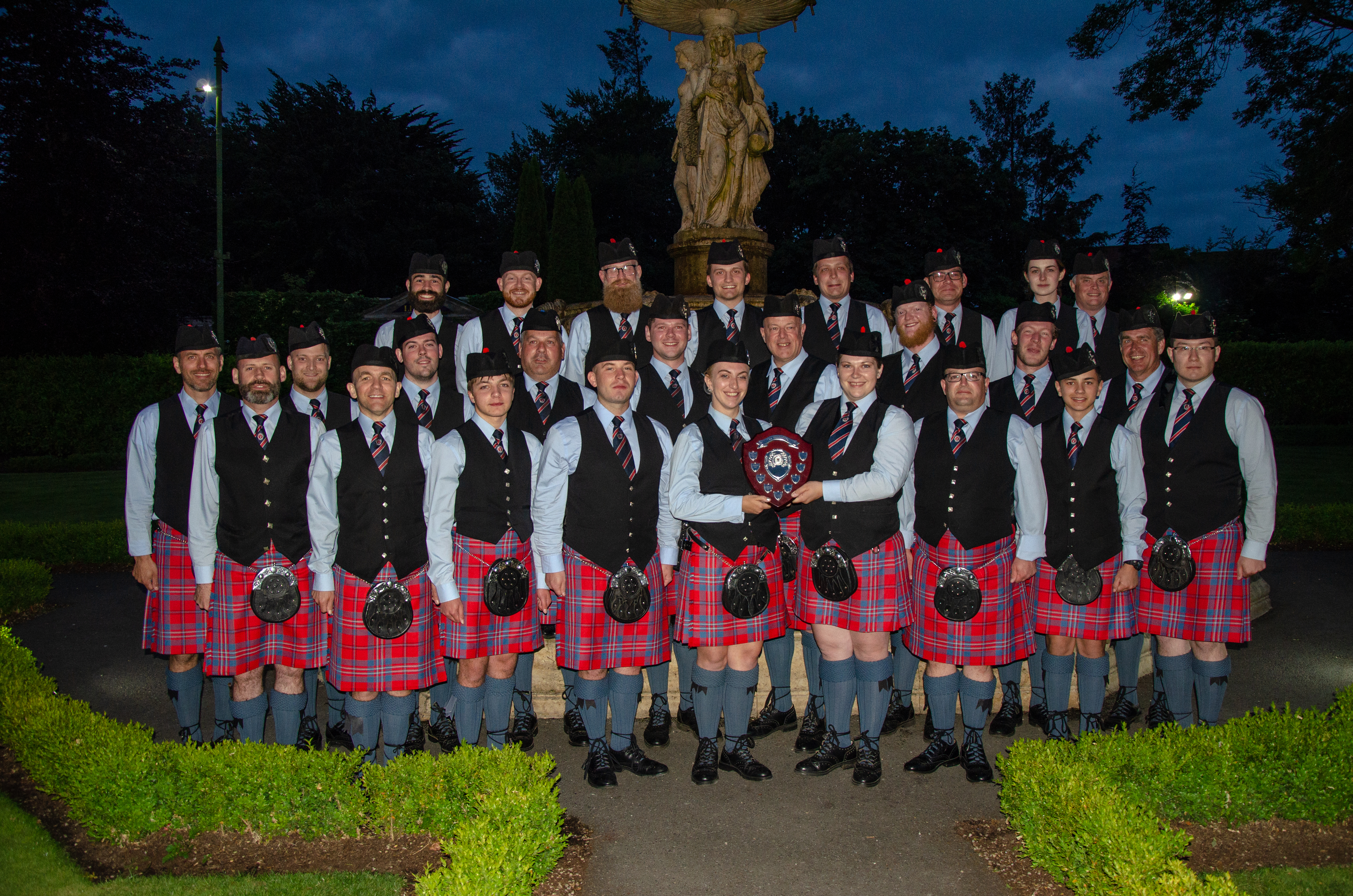
- Worcester Kiltie at the 2018 UK Championships
- Established: 1916
- Location: Worcester, Massachusetts
- Grade: 2
- Pipe major: David Methven
- Drum sergeant: Colum Lundt
- Tartan: Modern Scott
- Notable honours: World Champions: 2016 (Grade 3A); North American Champions: 1961, 1962, 1963, 1965, 1971 (Grade 1)
- Website: www.wkpb.org

The Worcester Kiltie Pipe Band is a Grade 2 pipe band from Worcester, Massachusetts. It is led by pipe major David Methven and lead drummer Colum Lundt. They compete in the United States, Canada, the United Kingdom, and other nations. Worcester Kiltie wears the Modern Scott tartan. They were the first band from the United States to rise to prominence in Grade 1, and in 1964 became the first US band to compete at the World Pipe Band Championships.

== History ==
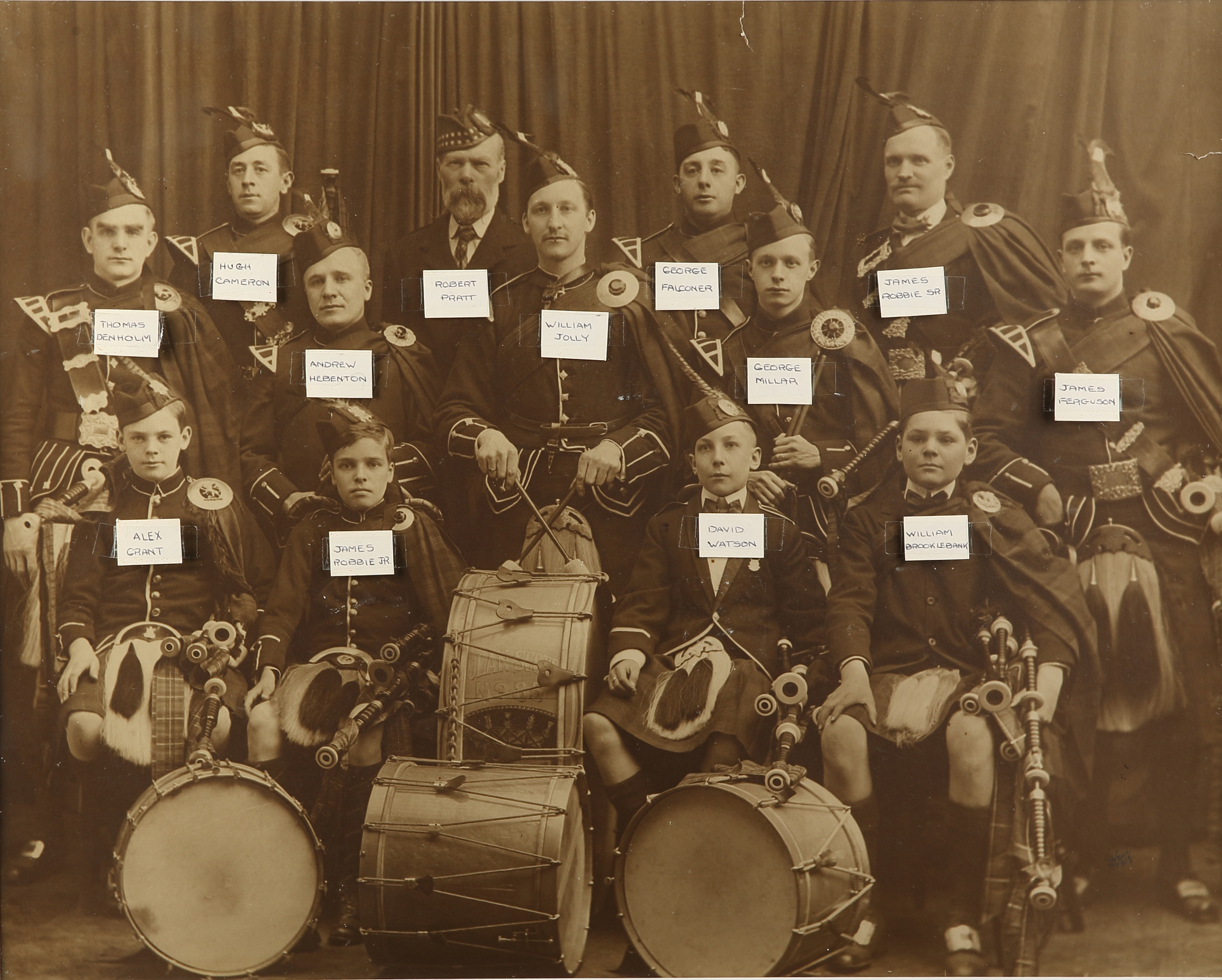
Early 1900's Worcester Kiltie Pipe Band. P/M Thomas Denholm can be seen in the top left.

=== Origins ===
Formed in 1916, Worcester Kiltie Pipe Band is one of the oldest active pipe bands in the United States. The band was founded by Thomas Denholm, a Scottish immigrant to the Worcester area. Denholm was familiar with the Clan Scott organization, and they assisted the early band with fundraising and events. To this day, the band wears the Scott tartan.

=== The Golden Years ===
In 1956, the band decided to put ads in newspapers in Scotland in an attempt to recruit players to move to the United States. Among the first to respond was Scottish piper James Kerr, who immigrated to the country and became pipe major. He was joined by his cousin, Alex Colville, who took over as lead drummer. They led the band to three straight North American Championships between 1961 and 1963, a fourth in 1965 and another in 1971.

Under Kerr's leadership, the Kilties put themselves on the international piping map in 1969 by winning a significant contest in Scotland and besting the reigning world champions, the Glasgow Police Pipe Band at the Lesmahagow Games. They followed that by placing third at the World Championships a few seasons later.

James Kerr remained the pipe major until retiring in 1983, moving on to become a solo and band judge.

=== Revival ===
In the years following Kerr's retirement, the band found itself competing in Grade 4, three grades below the heyday of Grade 1.

In 2012, like Denholm and Kerr before him, David Methven came over from Scotland to revive the once famous American band as pipe major. Methven was a world champion with Shotts and Dykehead Caledonia Pipe Band and pipe major for the Clan Gregor Society Pipe Band, leading them to a Grade 2 Worlds title in 2003. Methven, along with lead drummer Colum Lundt, previously of Peel Regional Police Pipe Band, took the reins after Pipe Major Neil Gow retired, and began their plan to return the band to its former glory.

Shortly after Methven assumed the role of pipe major, a relative of Thomas Denholm's reached out to the band. She donated Denholm's original pipes to the band, a silver and ivory set of RG Lawries from the 1910s. After some needed restoration by Methven, they are once again in use by the band's pipe major after nearly a century.

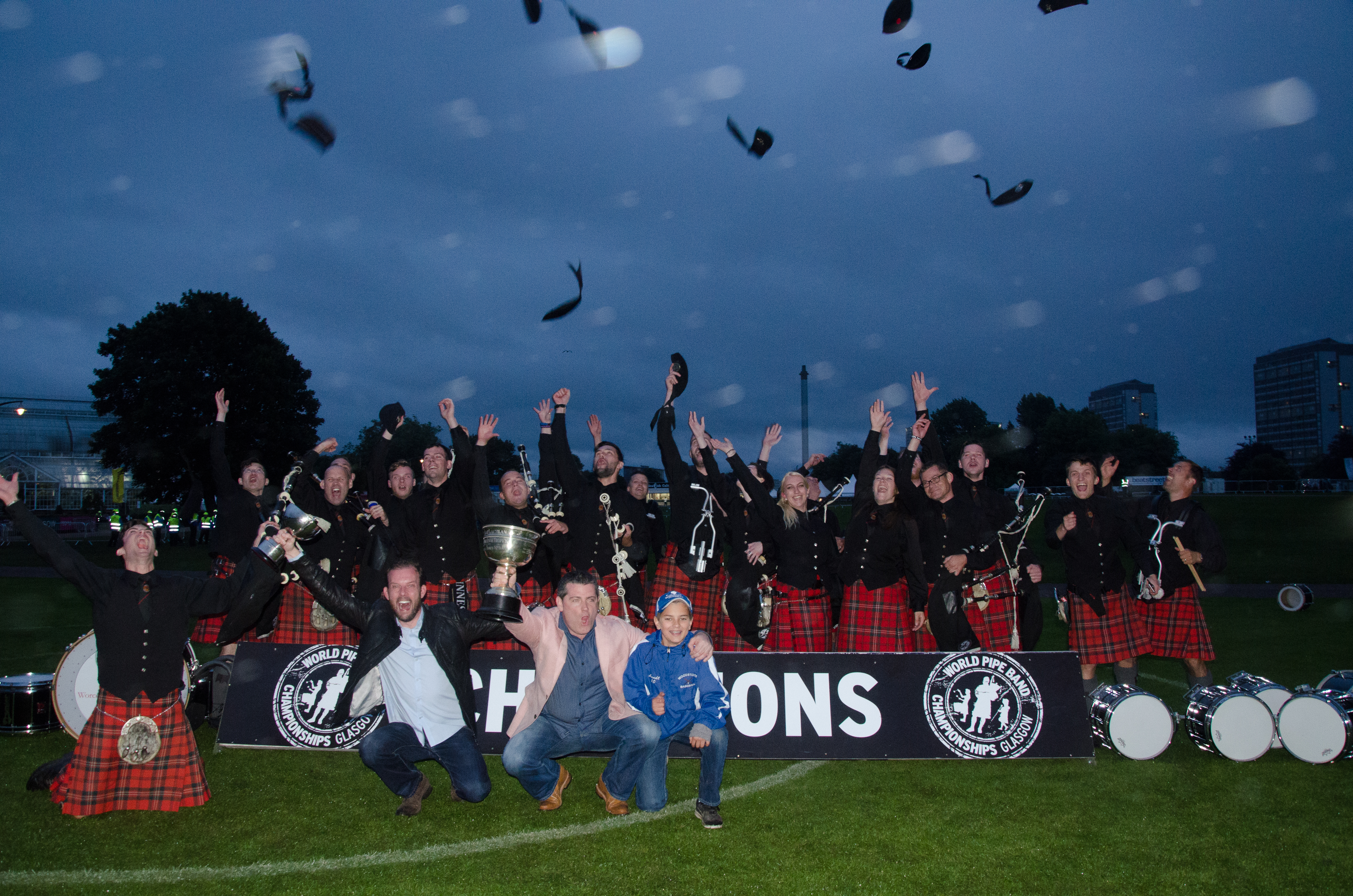
Worcester Kiltie after winning the 2016 World Championship in Grade 3A

=== Centennial and World Championship ===
2016 marked the hundredth anniversary for the band as they looked to continue their rise through the ranks. Now a Grade 3 band, Worcester had made two trips over to Scotland to compete at the World Championships. They finished eleventh in Grade 3A final in 2014, and failed to qualify for the final in 2015.

On their third attempt, they finished second in the qualifying round, and won the twelve-band final to be named Grade 3A World Champions on August 13.

=== Current Band ===
Currently the Kilties compete internationally in Grade 2, following an upgrade after the 2016 season. The band takes annual trips to at least one major contest per year.

Some recent results include:

- 3rd Place, 2018 UK Championships
- 5th Place, 2018 World Championships
- 2nd Place, 2019 North American Championships
- 6th Place, 2022 European Championships

== Pipe Majors ==
- Thomas Denholm (1916-?)
- James Kerr (1956-1983)
- Dave Stark
- John Reid
- Bill McGinnes
- Jimmy Rankine
- Greg Morrow
- Bob Burnett
- George McKendrick
- Donald Ritchie
- Iain Massie
- John Sullivan
- Ryan Fabrycki
- Greg Markiewicz
- Neil Gow
- Davy Methven (2012–present)
