= Oran Mor Pipe Band =

American pipe band

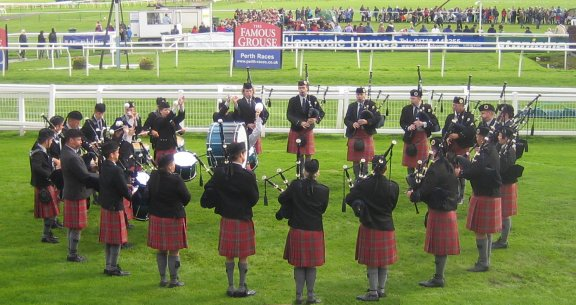
- Established: 1992
- Location: Albany, New York
- Grade: 1
- Pipe major: Andrew Douglas
- Drum sergeant: Eric MacNeil, Michael Eagle (2013 season)
- Tartan: Red Robertson
- Notable honours: [Grade 1] 14th place, World Pipe Band Championships [Grade 2] 4th place, World Pipe Band Championships (2008); [Grade 1] 3rd place, Perth (2008); [Grade 2] 1st place, Perth (2008); [Grade 2] 1st place, Bridge of Allan (2007); [Grade 2] 1st place (Qualifier), World Pipe Band Championships (2007); [Grade 2] 7th place (Finals), World Pipe Band Championships (2007); [Grade 2] 12th place, World Pipe Band Championships (2005); [Grade 2] 10th place, World Pipe Band Championships (2004) Grade II EUSPBA Champions Supreme: 1998, 2000, 2001, 2002, 2003, 2004, 2005, 2006, 2007
- Website: oranmorpipeband.com

The Oran Mor Pipe Band was a Grade 1 internationally competitive pipe band based in Albany, New York. It was founded in 1992 by Jim Clough, Bill MacNeill, and Donald Lindsay, and was one of the most consistently high-achieving pipe bands in the United States. Consistent success has earned it the title "Champions Supreme" in seven out of the last eight competition seasons with the Eastern United States Pipe Band Association (EUSPBA).

After competing in Grade 2 for many seasons, the band was officially promoted to Grade 1 by the EUSPBA in December 2007, and by the RSPBA in 2008 after The World Pipe Band Championships.

In 2009, the Oran Mor Pipe Band moved to grade 1, and in 2011, Oran Mor qualified for the grade 1 final at the World Pipe Band Championships in Scotland. The band was proud to play Dave's Tune Medley in the finals that year.

Late in 2013, the band merged with the Stuart Highlanders, a Grade 2 Pipe Band based in Boston, MA, USA.
