= Prince Charles Pipe Band =

American pipe band organization

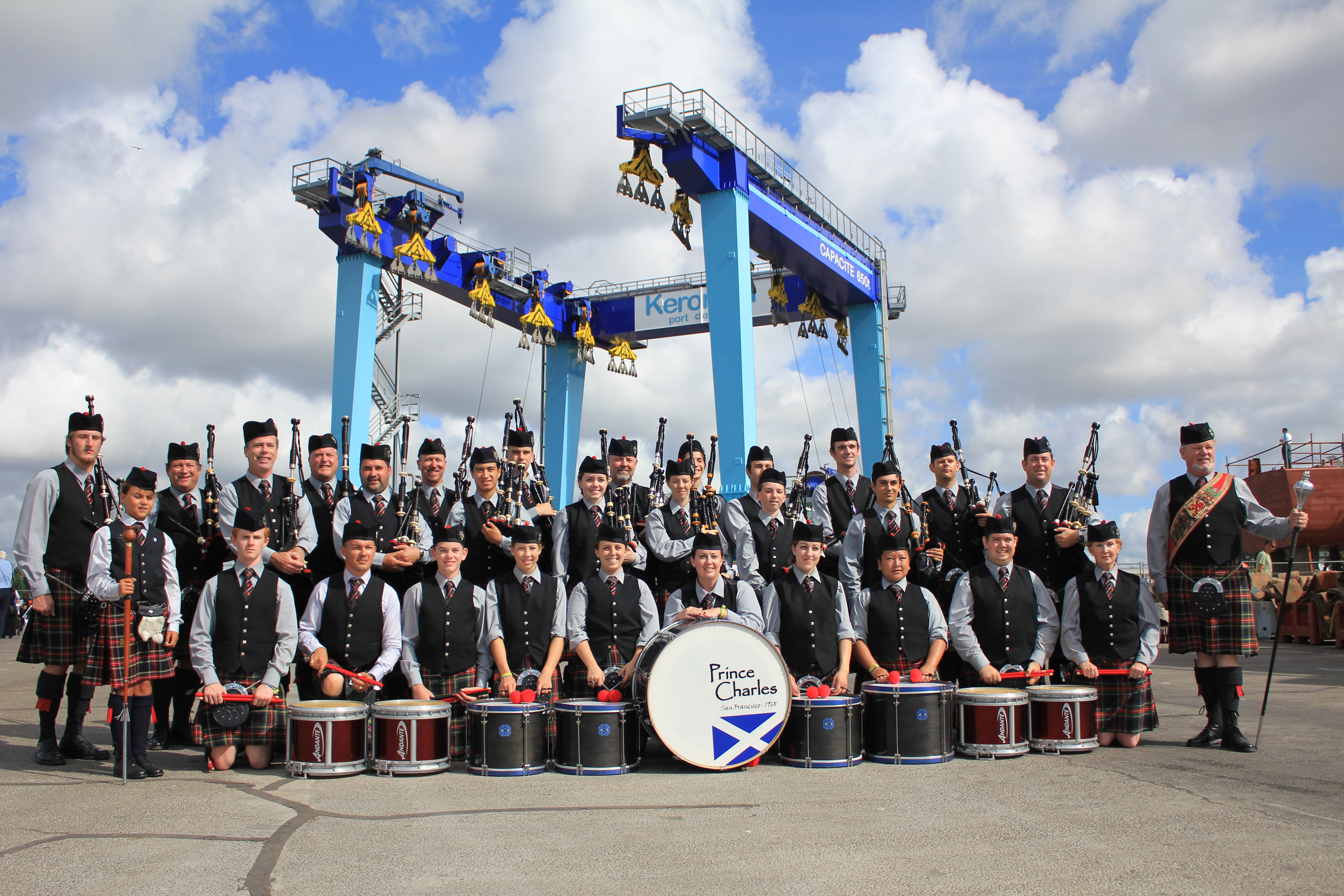
- Established: 1967
- Location: San Francisco, California
- Grade: 2, 3 and 5
- Drum sergeant: Duncan McPherson (gr2)
- Tartan: Black Stewart
- Website: www.pcpb.org

Founded in 1967 to train young people in piping and drumming, the Prince Charles Pipe Band is an extensive organization which includes Grade 2, Grade 3 and Grade 5 pipe bands. (Competitive Pipe bands are ranked from Grade 1 as the highest to Novice Juvenile as the lowest.) The Grade 2 band was re-formed in late 2008 with a combination of members from the now defunct Grade 1 band, and newer talent from the lower grade bands. Throughout its history in many different competitive classes, the band has won major prizes including the Grade 2 World Pipe Band Championship in 2000, after which the band became of only three Grade 1 bands in the United States. Prior to their Grade 1 placement, the Prince Charles Pipe Band frequently achieved high placings internationally in Scotland's major competitions as a junior and Grade 3 band.

Prince Charles Pipe Band currently operates Grade 2 and 5 bands.

== History ==
In 1967 J.W. Merriman, Jack Sutherland and Jerry Golanty - all members of the City of San Francisco (Caledonian) Pipe Band - realized that there was no organization to train young pipers and drummers in the Bay Area. In 1968 the band was founded by them and became officially a non-profit educational corporation. It is also a registered member of an Explorer Post of the Boy Scouts of America. Bill Merriman served as piping instructor and Jack Sutherland and Jerry Golanty as drumming instructors. Jack also served as band manager. Several years later Trevor Atkinson, another "Callie" band member, became the drumming instructor.

The band, which began with a small number of students, to date has trained approximately 500 pipers and drummers. Today there are very few bands anywhere in California that do not have a former PCPB member in their ranks.

When the Prince Charles band was founded the principles of the band included quality instruction, dedication, and discipline and these have not changed. As pipers and drummers grow in experience and maturity they are expected to pass on their learning to others.

The Prince Charles Pipe Band has actually been many bands over the years-from Grade 1 to Grade 4 and Juvenile, Junior and at one time a Ladies' Band. Besides entertaining for thousands of events, the bands have competed in the United States, Canada and in Scotland for 30 years.

Beginning in 1968 with a handful of pipers and drummers, the band had increased to 72 members in 1973 and traveled to Scotland to compete in international competition for the first time. The band was awarded the Marching and Deportment Trophy at the World Championships at Shotts. It was the first time a mixed gender band had ever competed in Scotland. In 1978, the band again competed in Scotland; it received a fourth place at the World Championships and first place at the Cowal Championships. In 1991 at the World Pipe Band Championships they won second place (first in drumming) and again received 1st place at the Cowal Championships.

In 1997, a new junior band competed at the World Championships receiving third place at Glasgow, third place at Cowal and 1st at Crieff. In 1998, the band, now playing as a Grade 3 Band, took 5th place in the World Championships and 1st at Crieff. In 1999, the band traveled to Scotland as a Grade 2 band, finishing 2nd at Bridge of Allan and 6th at the Worlds. In 2000, the band again competed in Grade 2, winning the World Championships.

Prince Charles Pipe Band currently operates Grade 2 and 5 competition bands. The current Grade 2 band won the 2009 Western United States Pipe Band Association (WUSPBA) Grade 2 Championship being the first season the band was re-established, and won it again in 2010.
