= Pipe major =

Leading musician of a pipe band

The pipe major is the leading musician in a military or civilian pipe band. Like drum major, the position is derived from British Army traditions. It is an appointment and not a service rank.

A pipe major is often assisted by a pipe sergeant, who has similar duties in the band and leads the band in the absence of the pipe major, in addition to a third-ranking pipe corporal. During the early twentieth century, the term sergeant piper was used.

== Military ==
=== British Army ===
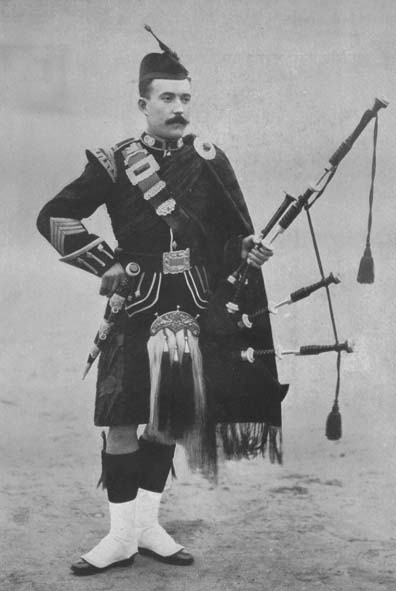
A photograph from c. 1890s of Pipe Major Colin Thomson of the Argyll and Sutherland Highlanders.

A pipe major's position is an appointment and not a rank in the British Army. An appointee is required to have attained the rank of at least sergeant and to have successfully completed the pipe major's course at the Army School of Bagpipe Music and Highland Drumming, which is a 28-week long course. A pipe major may subsequently be promoted to staff sergeant/colour sergeant, warrant officer class 2, and rarely warrant officer class 1. A few WO1s later go on to be commissioned as director of music of the Army School of Bagpipe Music and Highland Drumming. Since the pipes and drums of an infantry regiment are typically assigned the military duties of a machine gun platoon, the pipe major is also responsible for:

- Command (or second-in-command) of the platoon during military exercises or combat
- Maintenance of military discipline in his platoon
- Purveyance and promotion of regimental custom, tradition and history

He is customarily addressed and referred to as "Pipe Major", not by his service rank. The insignia of appointment is four point-up chevrons worn on a wrist-strap whilst in shirt-sleeve order, or four large point-up chevrons worn on the uniform sleeve, surmounted by a bagpipe badge. Staff sergeants/colour sergeants have a small crown above the bagpipes, whilst warrant officers class 2 have a larger crown and warrant officers class 1 wear the royal arms as usual.

=== Canadian Armed Forces ===
Insignia of a Canadian Army pipe major is four upturned chevrons overlaid with bagpipes.

A pipe major in the Canadian military is also an appointment, not a service rank. Pipe majors are appointed by the commanding officer of a unit or formation. The insignia (a four-bar chevron with bagpipe badge) is usually surmounted by the service rank badge. Regular force personnel attend a year long course at the Canadian Forces School of Music - Pipes and Drums Wing to become qualified to as a pipe major.

Most pipe majors in the Canadian forces are also responsible for regular force volunteer bands or primary reserve bands, and there are two pipe majors posted to regular force brass and reed bands, the Royal Canadian Air Force Band and the Royal Canadian Artillery Band, and one posted to the pipes and drums of the 2nd Battalion, Royal Canadian Regiment, Canada's only regular force army pipe band.

== Civilian bands ==
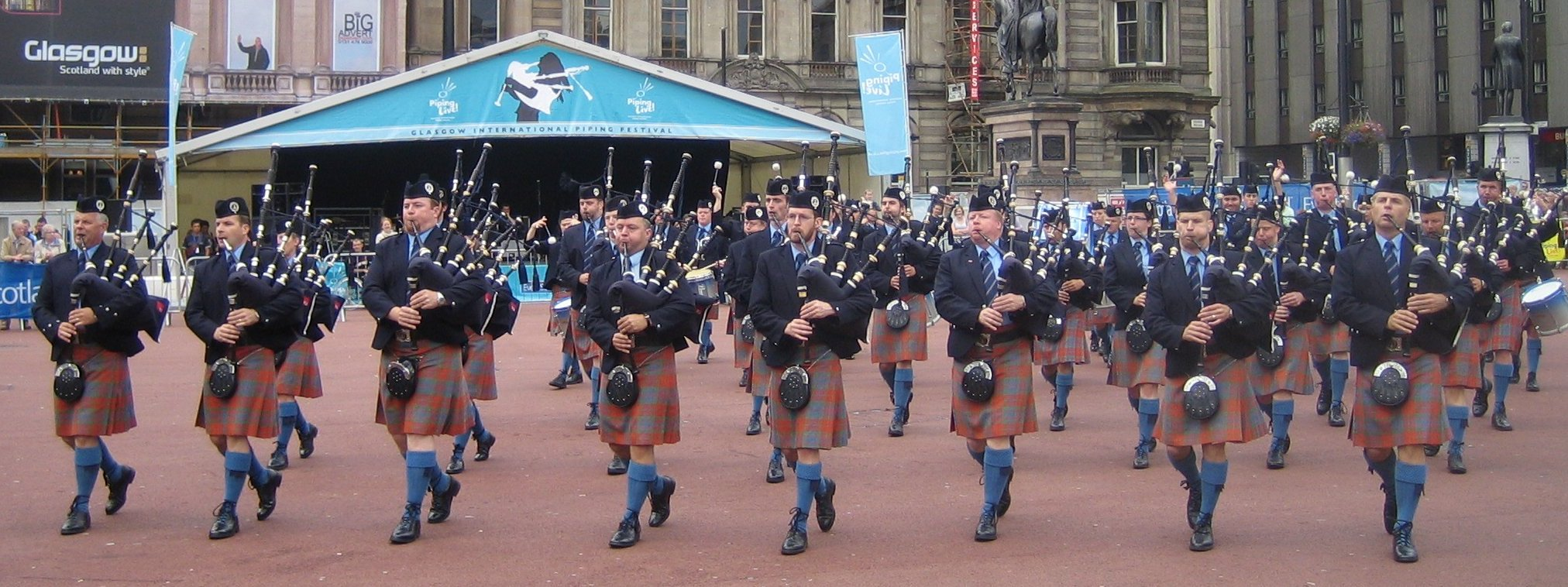
The civilian Simon Fraser University Pipe Band led by pipe major Terry Lee on the right of the band and pipe sergeant Jack Lee on the left

In a civilian band, the pipe major is generally the leader of the band both musically and administratively.

Some pipe majors also compete in solo competitions.
