= World Solo Drumming Championships =

- Genre: Solo snare drumming competition
- Frequency: Annually
- Location: Glasgow
- Years active: 1947–present
- Current Champion: Kerr McQuillan, Peoples Ford Boghall and Bathgate Caledonia pipe band
- Sponsor: Andante Drums & Percussion
- Website: https://www.glasgowlife.org.uk/arts-music-and-culture/world-pipe-band-championships/world-solo-drumming-championship

The World Solo Drumming Championships is an annual event organized by the Royal Scottish Pipe Band Association, and sponsored (since 2000) by Andante Drums & Percussion. First prize in the Adult division is considered the top individual award obtainable in competitive pipe band snare drumming.

== History ==
Little is known of the event prior to 1947, although the book "One Hundred Years of Pipe Band Drumming" (Young & Chatto) mentions Charlie Davis winning the "SPBA Individual Solo Drumming Championships" in 1937.

No event was held in 1999 due to a lack of sponsorship.

Jim Kilpatrick has been most successful over the years, being named World Champion a record 16 times. The current title holder is Kerr McQuillan of the Boghall and Bathgate Caledonia Pipe band

== List of winners ==
Year	Winner	Band Affiliation	Win #
1947	George (Geordie) Pryde	Edinburgh Specials Pipe Band	1
1948	James (Jimmy) Catherwood	Edinburgh City Police Pipe Band	1
1949	Alex Duthart	Dalzell Highland Pipe Band	1
1950	Alex Duthart	Dalzell Highland Pipe Band	2
1951	Alex Duthart	Dalzell Highland Pipe Band	3
1952	A. McCallum		1
1953	Alex Duthart	Dalzell Highland Pipe Band	4
1954	John B. (Jock) Kerr	Shotts and Dykehead Caledonia Pipe Band	1
1955	J. Neil		1
1956	Davie Splitt	Lochore Pipe Band	1
1957	J. Robb		1
1958	Alex Helie	Renfrew Pipe Band	1
1959	Adam Clacher	Michael Colliery Pipe Band	1
1960	Willie Clark	Clan MacRae Society Pipe Band	1
1961	Alex Duthart	Shotts and Dykehead Caledonia Pipe Band	5
1962	Robert (Bob) Montgomery	Edinburgh City Police Pipe Band	1
1963	Dave Armit	Shotts and Dykehead Caledonia Pipe Band	1
1964	Jim Hutton	Muirhead & Sons Pipe Band	1
1965	Robert (Bert) Barr	Shotts and Dykehead Caledonia Pipe band	1
1966	Robert (Bobby) Rae	Ballycoan Pipe Band	1
1967	Wilson Young	Red Hackle Pipe Band	1
1968	Alex Duthart	Edinburgh City Police Pipe Band	6
1969	Robert (Bob) Montgomery	Edinburgh City Police Pipe Band	2
1970	Jim Hutton	Edinburgh City Police Pipe Band	2
1971	Jim Hutton	Edinburgh City Police Pipe Band	3
1972	Joe Noble	Renfrew Pipe Band	1
1973	Jim Hutton	Shotts and Dykehead Caledonia Pipe Band	4
1974	Robert (Bert) Barr	Shotts and Dykehead Caledonia Pipe Band	2
1975	Joe Noble	British Caledonian Airways (Renfrew) Pipe Band	2
1976	Robert (Bert) Barr	Shotts and Dykehead Caledonia Pipe Band	3
1977	Jim Kilpatrick	Shotts and Dykehead Caledonia Pipe Band	1
1978	John Scullion	Shotts and Dykehead Caledonia Pipe Band	1
1979	John Scullion	Shotts and Dykehead Caledonia Pipe Band	2
1980	Jim Kilpatrick	Polkemmet Colliery Pipe Band Pipe Band	2
1981	John Scullion	Shotts and Dykehead Caledonia Pipe Band	3
1982	John Scullion	Shotts and Dykehead Caledonia Pipe Band	4
1983	Jim Kilpatrick	Polkemmet Colliery Pipe Band Pipe Band	3
1984	Robert (Bobby) Rea	Royal Ulster Constabulary Pipe Band	2
1985	Jim Kilpatrick	Polkemmet Grorud Pipe Band Pipe Band	4
1986	Jim Kilpatrick	Polkemmet Grorud Pipe Band Pipe Band	5
1987	Andrew Scullion	Pipes & Drums of the Royal Ulster Constabulary	1
1988	Arthur Cook	Lothian & Borders Police Pipe Band	1
1989	Paul Turner	Vale of Atholl Pipe Band	1
1990	Jim Kilpatrick	Shotts and Dykehead Caledonia Pipe Band	6
1991	Jim Kilpatrick	Shotts and Dykehead Caledonia Pipe Band	7
1992	Jim Kilpatrick	Shotts and Dykehead Caledonia Pipe Band	8
1993	Andrew Scullion	Cullybackey Pipe Band	2
1994	Gordon Brown	Boghall and Bathgate Caledonia Pipe Band	1
1995	Jim Kilpatrick	Shotts and Dykehead Caledonia Pipe Band	9
1996	Jim Kilpatrick	Shotts and Dykehead Caledonia Pipe Band	10
1997	Andrew Scullion	Eden Pipe Band	3
1998	Jim Kilpatrick	Shotts and Dykehead Caledonia Pipe Band	11
1999	*No contest was held this year*		
2000	Jim Kilpatrick	Shotts and Dykehead Caledonia Pipe Band	12
2001	Jim Kilpatrick	Shotts and Dykehead Caledonia Pipe Band	13
2002	Gordon Brown	Boghall and Bathgate Caledonia Pipe Band	2
2003	Jim Kilpatrick	Shotts and Dykehead Caledonia Pipe Band	14
2004	Jim Kilpatrick	Shotts and Dykehead Caledonia Pipe Band	15
2005	Jim Kilpatrick	Shotts and Dykehead Caledonia Pipe Band	16
2006	Steven McWhirter	Simon Fraser University Pipe Band	1
2007	Barry Wilson	ScottishPower Pipe Band	1
2008	Barry Wilson	ScottishPower Pipe Band	2
2009	Barry Wilson	ScottishPower Pipe Band	3
2010	Barry Wilson	ScottishPower Pipe Band	4
2011	Steven McWhirter	Inveraray & District Pipe Band	2
2012	Steven McWhirter	Inveraray & District Pipe Band	3
2013	Steven McWhirter	Inveraray & District Pipe Band	4
2014	Steven McWhirter	Inveraray & District Pipe Band	5
2015	Steven McWhirter	Inveraray & District Pipe Band	6
2016	Steven McWhirter	Inveraray & District Pipe Band	7
2017	Steven McWhirter	Inveraray & District Pipe Band	8
2018	Steven McWhirter	Inveraray and District	9
2019	Steven McWhirter	Inveraray and District	10
2022	Steven McWhirter	Inveraray and District	11
2023	Kerr McQuillan	Peoples Ford Boghall and Bathgate Caledonia Pipe Band	1
2024	Steven Mcwhirter	Inveraray and District	12
2025	Kerr McQuillan	Peoples Ford Boghall and Bathgate Caledonia Pipe Band	2
2026	Kerr McQuillan	Peoples Ford Boghall and Bathgate Caledonia Pipe Band	3
