= Roddy MacDonald (pipe major) =

- Born: 27 July 1956 (age 70); Inverness, Scotland
- Occupations: Piper, composer
- Instrument: Bagpipes

Roderick S. MacDonald (born 1956) is a pipe major, living in Brisbane, Australia, and a composer of tunes for the bagpipes.

MacDonald hails from the Scottish town of Inverness. His father is the renowned player, judge and composer of music, William MacDonald (of Gaelic-speaking Benbecula) and his grandfather, Donald MacDonald, was the pipe major of the 1st Battalion the Highland Light Infantry.

He was originally taught by John Hunter, tutor with the Inverness Boys Brigade Pipe Band, an ex-Cameron Highlander and veteran of the Somme. He was also influenced by George Gershwin through his school's music teacher. He later played with the Inverness British Legion, Invergordon Distillery and British Caledonian Airways pipe bands. He also played for many years with the Balmoral Highlanders showband in London and toured extensively with them under the direction of his lifelong friend and pipe major, Willie Cochrane. In 1978, UK Top 20 single Scotch Machine by Voyage featured MacDonald's piping.

MacDonald's compositions have featured in over fifty recordings to date, including those of The Vale of Atholl Pipe Band, the Black Watch, The 78th Fraser Highlanders Pipe Band, The Royal Scots Dragoon Guards, The Scots Guards, Simon Fraser University Pipe Band, Shooglenifty, The Tannahill Weavers, MacUmba, Ceolbeg, Slainte Mhath, Martyn Bennett, Gordon Duncan, The Finlay MacDonald Band, the Coldstream Guards and the Red Hot Chilli Pipers. In 1986 he published the Clanranald Collection of bagpipe music and in 2003 released his debut album Good Drying which has received a considerable number of rave reviews in the international music press.

In 2001 MacDonald left London after 26-years and currently resides in Australia and Japan, where he is employed as a professional musician.

In 2001 MacDonald was commissioned by the Piper and Drummer magazine and GHB Communications of Toronto to compose a modern piobaireachd. The piece was entitled Lament for Kenneth Alexander MacLennan of Connon Bridge and was published later that year.

He commenced employment in February 2003 as the pipe major and music director of the Queensland Police Pipes and Drums, and went on to compose the tune named for the organisation's motto, With Honour We Serve. On 15 March 2006 at Government House, the Governor of Queensland appointed MacDonald as 'The Governor's Piper' and presented him with her personal standard, to be flown from his bagpipes during vice-regal occasions.

As part of Homecoming Scotland 2009, two compositions were commissioned for the Edinburgh Military Tattoo. Salute to Australia by MacDonald was also played at the Tattoo's 2010 Australian tour. McDonald is the only Australian to have been Lone Piper at the Tattoo in both Scotland and Australia. The year 2009 also saw the publication of sixty tunes, R S MacDonald: The collection.

In 2016 the Red Hot Chilli Pipers recorded MacDonald's composition The Fallen for charity. The accompanying video had in excess of two million views of the BBC.

MacDonald is a captain in the Australian Army and part of their reserve army band and the 1 RAA Pipes and Drums in Brisbane, Queensland.
