= Chris Armstrong (piper) =

Scottish bagpiper (b. 1980)

Chris Armstrong BEM
- Born: 2 February 1980 (age 46); Bathgate, West Lothian, Scotland
- Instrument: Bagpipes
- Member of: ScottishPower Pipe Band
- Website: www.chrisarmstrong.co

Chris Armstrong BEM (born 2 February 1980) is a bagpiper from Scotland and pipe major of the ScottishPower Pipe Band.

== Life ==
Armstrong was born in Bathgate on 2 February 1980. He started learning the bagpipes at the age of 6, and played in the Torphichen and Bathgate juvenile band, where he was taught by Pipe Major John Matheson.

After a spell of not competing in a band, and then playing in a number of different groups, he became pipe sergeant of Torphichen and Bathgate Pipe Band for two years.

He became pipe major of the David Urquhart Travel Pipe Band in 2004, and then in 2006 became leader of the ScottishPower Pipe Band.

He is an instructor at the National Piping Centre, and also teaches at Kilmarnock Schools pipe band. Armstrong also runs a business producing drone reeds, and has designed a range of bagpipes that are produced by Wallace Bagpipes.

He favours a high-pitched chanter.

== Solo results ==
He has won major prizes for both pibroch and light music.

- Winner of the Former Winners March, Strathspey and Reel at the Argyllshire Gathering in 2001 and 2011
- Winner of the Gold medal (piping) at the Northern Meeting in 2003
- Winner of the Bratach Gorm in 2007

== Discography ==
- Notes In Ma Heid (1997)
- Quantum Leap (1999)
- X-Treme (2003)

== Bibliography ==
- Notes frae ma Heid Volume 1
- Notes frae ma Heid Volume 2
- The Collection
- RE:Tradition
