= Donald Shaw Ramsay =

Scottish bagpiper

- Born: August 4, 1919; Muiravonside
- Died: July 14, 1998 (aged 78)
- Occupation: Police officer
- Instrument: Bagpipes

Donald Shaw Ramsay BEM (4 August 1919– 14 July 1998) was a Scottish bagpiper. Qualified as a pipe major in the British Army, he led the Edinburgh City Police Pipe Band to victory at the World Championships twice and was also leader of the all-star Invergordon Distillery Pipe Band during its four years of existence.

== Life ==
Ramsay was born in the parish of Muiravonside, near Torphichen, on 4 August 1919, to parents Donald Ramsay and Elizabeth Eadie. He went to primary school at Drumbowie, near Avonbridge, and then went to Falkirk High School before taking an engineering apprenticeship in Bathgate.

He was taught by Sandy Forrest, pipe major of the Torphichen and Bathgate Pipe Band, and competed successfully as a soloist, coming second in the under-21 Pibroch competition at the Northern Meeting. At the age of nineteen he became pipe major of a band near Falkirk, which would provide valuable experience about the qualities required to lead a pipe band.

At the outbreak of World War II he joined the Highland Light Infantry, and became the youngest pipe major in the British Army at the age of 20 after passing the course at Edinburgh Castle under the tuition of Willie Ross. In 1947 he joined the Edinburgh City Police and in 1949 took over as pipe major of the Edinburgh City Police Pipe Band, and then led the band to victory in the World Pipe Band Championships in 1950.

Ramsay significantly improved the standard of the band, attracting several top players and taking the band to another Worlds title in 1954. The band would go on to win a further 6 titles after he left.

In March 1957 he was shot and seriously injured while on duty and subsequently retired in 1958 to California, where he took the San Francisco Caledonian Pipe Band to Grade 1 by 1960 for the first time in its history. He ran a business selling highland supplies, but in 1964 returned to Scotland to become pipe major of the Invergordon Distillery Pipe Band at the invitation of distillery owner Frank Thomson, who wanted to create a top-class band to promote the business.

Invergordon won every major title except the World Championships during its four years of existence, and included top-class players such as John D. Burgess and Alex Duthart. After the Invergordon Distillery band ceased to exist in 1967 he returned to California, and he was involved in judging in both North America and the UK.

With his wife Elizabeth he had a daughter Morag. He died on 14 July 1998 and was buried in Polmont.

== Musical influence ==
He has been credited with expanding the repertoire played by pipe bands, due to the need for the Edinburgh police band to provide entertainment for an hour or more at a time, although he also expressed disapproval of bands playing music that is not traditionally Scottish, in particular Breton music.

He composed a number of tunes, among them the 3/4 march Schiehallion, the 6/8 marches Mrs. Lily Christie and Angus MacKinnon, the 2/4 march Jimmy Young and the hornpipe Tam Bain's Lum. He also compiled the Edcath Collection, a series of two books published in 1953 and 1958 by Hugh MacPherson.

== Discography ==
- Pipe Major Donald Shaw Ramsay (1942)
- Pipe Major Donald Shaw Ramsay of The Edinburgh Police Pipe Band (1950s)
