= Willie McCallum =

- Born: 19 April 1961 (age 64); Campbeltown
- Instrument: Bagpipes
- Website: www.williemccallum.com

Willie McCallum is Scottish Highland bagpipe player.

== Life ==
He was born in Campbeltown, Kintyre. He was mainly taught by his uncles Ronald and Hugh A. McCallum, but also by Ronald McCallum, MBE, Piper to The Duke of Argyll. The family is directly related to John MacAlister who won the Prize Pipe at the Falkirk Tryst in 1782.

As a youngster he heard the top solo pipers in the world through the Kintyre Piping Society, which was revived in the 1970s by his father, also Willie. These piping recitals featured the likes of P/M John D Burgess, Donald MacPherson, P/M Donald MacLeod, Iain MacFadyen, Hugh MacCallum, John MacFadyen, John MacDougall, Duncan MacFadyen, Duncan Johnstone, Angus J MacLellan and John Wilson.

Prior to 2010, he worked as an accountant at the University of Strathclyde. He now has his own business and acts as a consultant for McCallum Bagpipes and Bannatyne Pipe Bag Makers, as well as teaching and adjudicating across the world. McCallum has taken part in a number of overseas piping schools, and in 2016 was appointed lead tutor at the National Piping Centre for B.Mus.Trad piping degree program offered by the Royal Conservatoire of Scotland.

He lives in Bearsden with his wife Christine, with whom he has a daughter and a son.

== Career ==
Willie McCallum has won many top solo piping prizes several times, including:

- Bratach Gorm (4 times - 1991, 1999, 2002, 2011)
- Gold Medal at the Argyllshire Gathering (1995)
- Gold Medal at the Northern Meeting (1989)
- Glenfiddich Championship (9 times - 1990, 1993, 1994, 1999, 2000, 2001, 2004, 2005, 2022)
- Former Winners MSR, Northern Meeting (4 times - 2004, 2006, 2009, 2012)
- Former Winners MSR, Argyllshire Gathering (5 times - 1990, 1999, 2000, 2002, 2008)
- Silver Chanter (3 times - 1994, 1995, 1996)
- Metro Cup (3 times - 2008, 2009, 2015)
- Donald Macleod Memorial (9 times - 2000, 2001, 2003, 2004, 2005, 2007, 2008, 2012, 2015)
- Dr Dan Reid Memorial (7 times - 1995, 1996, 2000, 2001, 2004, 2005, 2008)
- Former Winners MSR London (5 times - 1998, 1999, 2000, 2004, 2009)

He was notably invited to the Glenfiddich Championships 29 consecutive times between 1988 and 2016.

With the ScottishPower Pipe Band he has been runner-up at the World Pipe Band Championships twice, and in 2008 and 2016 he played with the Spirit of Scotland Pipe Band.

He plays inherited bagpipes that he believes to be Hendersons, with a McCallum McC^{2} solo chanter.

== Discography ==
He has recorded three solo albums, and featured in several other compilations.

- Pipers of Distinction - (Monarch, 1989)
- Hailey's Song - (Temple, 1995)
- World's Greatest Pipers Vol. 14 - (Lismor 2000)
