= Stuart Liddell =

Stuart Liddell MBE
- Born: January 12, 1973 (age 53)
- Origin: Inveraray, Scotland
- Occupation: Piano Tuner
- Instrument: Bagpipes
- Website: www.stuartliddell.com

Stuart Liddell MBE (born 12 January 1973) is a Scottish bagpipe player, playing Great Highland bagpipe. As well as competing in solo competitions, he is the Pipe major of the Inveraray and District Pipe Band.

== Early life ==
He was born in Oban on 12 January 1973 and spent his early years in Inveroran, near Bridge of Orchy. His father Billy was an accomplished musician, as is his mother Agnes, and his grandfather was Ronnie McCallum, piper to the Duke of Argyll and a prominent piping tutor. At the age of four the family moved to Moffat in Dumfriesshire where Stuart went to school. The family moved to Inveraray, his mother's home town, in 1983.

== Band history ==
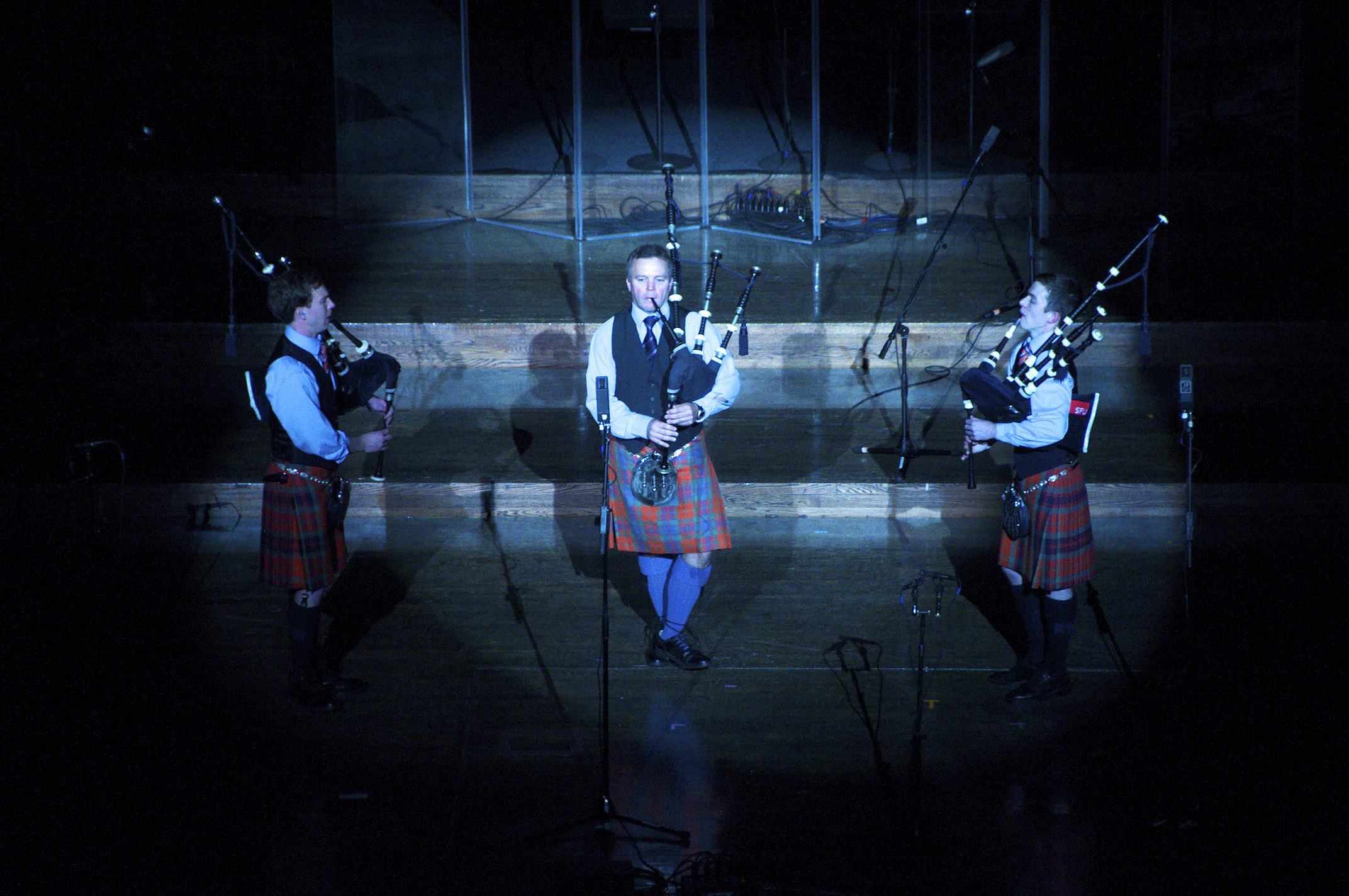
Liddell (centre) playing with Simon Fraser University

For ten years (1998–2008), he played with the Simon Fraser University Pipe Band in Burnaby, British Columbia. With the SFU Pipe band he won three World Pipe Band Championship titles, in 1999, 2001, and 2008. Before joining the SFU Pipe Band, he played with ScottishPower Pipe Band.

Liddell lives in Inveraray and is Pipe major of the Grade 1 Inveraray & District Pipe Band, which he founded in 2003.

Stuart Liddell has won the World Pipe Band Championships as Pipe major of Inveraray & District Pipe Band in 2017, 2019, 2024 and 2025.

== Solo Prizes ==
Liddell has won many of the top awards in solo piping, including the Gold Medal at the Argyllshire Gathering (2000), the Gold Medal at the Northern Meeting (2004), the Clasp at the Northern Meeting four times (2007, 2009, 2013 and 2025), the Bratach Gorm at the Scottish Piping Society of London (2009).

He has won the Glenfiddich Piping Championship four times: 2009,2014, 2020, and 2025. In 2023, Liddell was made a Member of the British Empire (MBE) in King Charles III's first New Year Honours.

He is known for his fast playing and innovative arrangements of piping standards.

In October 2025, he became the first pipe major ever to hold the Glenfiddich Championship and the World Pipe Band Championship simultaneously.

== Recordings ==
In 2007, Liddell released his first solo recording, Inveroran. He has also appeared on several recordings of Simon Fraser University Pipe Band, with solo tracks on many discs, including:

- 1997 Piping Centre Recital Series Vol.2
- Scottish Power Pipe Band – Tartan Weave
- Simon Fraser University Pipe Band – Live at Carnegie Hall
- Simon Fraser University Pipe Band - Down Under
- Awesome Pipers - 2004
- Simon Fraser University Pipe Band – On Home Ground
- Inveroran
