= Piping Live! Festival =

- Frequency: Annual
- Location: Glasgow
- Years active: 23
- Attendance: 30,000
- Website: www.pipinglive.co.uk

The Piping Live! Festival (originally Piping Hot Festival) is an annual bagpiping event held in Glasgow by the National Piping Centre. The festival was created in 2003 and occurs on the run-up to the World Pipe Band Championships. It is estimated that the festival alone adds £12 million to Scotland's tourism revenue and it is the largest bagpipe festival in the world.

The festival is always opened with performances in the Royal Concert Hall by musicians including The National Youth Pipe Band of Scotland. The festival itself consists of over 150 individual events including free classes, concerts and ceilidhs throughout the week. The festival has held its own "Canada Day" to celebrate the multitude of Canadian Grade I bands who participate in the Championships. The Piping Centre also produces and releases albums around the festival, such as Seudan by the band of the same name in 2011.

The festival won Event of The Year at the Scottish Traditional Music Awards in 2008 and in 2010 Eve Muirhead was named the festival's ambassador in an effort to reach out to a younger audience. The event has been directed since 2020 by Finlay MacDonald. Former directors include Roddy MacLeod.
