= Roddy MacLeod =

Roddy MacLeod MBE
- Also known as: Roddy
- Born: Roderick MacLeod; 26 August 1962 (age 63); Glasgow, Scotland
- Genres: Pibroch
- Instrument: Bagpipes
- Years active: 1978–present
- Member of: The National Youth Pipe Band of Scotland
- Formerly of: Spirit of Scotland Pipe Band
- Awards: Northern Meeting; Kishmul Banner; Argyllshire Gathering; Glenfiddich Piping Championships; Bratach Gorm; Silver Chanter; Northern Meeting Clasp; Gillies Cup Open; Glenfiddich Spirit of Scotland Award
- Website: roddymacleodbagpipes.com

Roderick J. (Roddy) MacLeod MBE (born August 26, 1962) is a Scottish bagpiper, director of the annual Piping Live! Festival and former principal of the National Piping Centre.

He is known to be vocal against Scottish reforms in the realm of piping. In 2006, when the government ordered pipers to play quietly, and protect their ears whilst practising, he was quoted as saying; ""If you are practising to become a serious piper, you cannot do so within these kinds of limits."

In the same year he campaigned to introduce means-testing to acquire a busker's licence in Edinburgh.

After speaking out against the lack of piping teachers in Scottish schools, he introduced Skype lessons in 2008 for would-be pipers as a potential solution to the problem. He also suggested that the chanter replace the recorder in primary schools.

He is a ten-time winner of the Piobaireachd at the Glenfiddich Solo Piping Championship; a record, and has won the overall title five times.

In 1995, he became the Pipe Major of the ScottishPower Pipe Band and served until 2006 and in 2012 he was inducted into the Scottish Traditional Hall of Fame.
