= Invergordon Distillery Pipe Band =

Scottish pipe band

- Established: 1964
- Disbanded: 1967
- Location: Invergordon
- Grade: 1 (former)
- Pipe major: Donald Shaw Ramsay
- Drum major: Sandy Macpherson
- Drum sergeant: Alex Duthart
- Tartan: Red Gordon

Invergordon Distillery Pipe Band was a pipe band associated with the Invergordon Distillery. The band was characterised by the extremely high calibre of the individual players.

== History ==
The idea of forming a band was put forward by a production manager at the distillery, Willie MacDonald, who played as a drummer at the time with the Dingwall British Legion Pipe Band. Frank Thomson, the owner of the distillery, decided to create the band with a view to winning the World Championships and bringing considerable attention to the firm.

The band had its first outing on 9 May 1964, when it marched down the High Street in Invergordon with twelve pipers, three snare drummers, two tenor drummers and a bass drummer, led by Drum major Sandy Macpherson.

At the end of the 1964 competition season, the Royal Scottish Pipe Band Association placed the Invergordon Distillery Pipe Band straight into Grade 1, and Donald Shaw Ramsay was made pipe major at the turn of the year. Alex Duthart was persuaded by Ramsay to leave Shotts and Dykehead to join the band in 1964, and was the leading drummer for four seasons until he left for Edinburgh City Police. The band members were employed by and worked in the distillery by day.

Nine months after Ramsay was made pipe major, the band won the European Championships, and was placed in every major competition in 1965. In 1965, 1966 and 1967 it won every major competition except the World Championships, which was at that time dominated by Muirhead & Sons, which won five consecutive times between 1965 and 1969. The drum corps, however, did win the title of Best Drum Corps at the Worlds in 1966 and 1967, before Alex Duthart moved to Edinburgh City Police Pipe Band to win the title of best drum corps with that band in 1968. The band's best overall result in the World Championships was a third place in 1967.

John D. Burgess played with the band after settling in Invergordon in 1966. Burgess had taken over from Donald Shaw Ramsay as pipe major of Edinburgh Police in 1957.

The band broke up after sponsorship ended in 1967, four years after its inception.

== Recordings ==
The band was musically innovative, and made a famous recording of the pibroch The Old Woman's Lullaby, a style of music normally performed by a solo piper, with multiple harmonies and drums.

- Pipes in Concert (1966)
