= Spirit of Scotland Pipe Band =

Scottish pipe band

- Established: 2008, 2016
- Location: Glasgow
- Grade: 1
- Pipe major: Roddy MacLeod
- Drum sergeant: John Fisher (2008), Jim Kilpatrick (2016)
- Tartan: Isle of Skye
- Notable honours: 2016 UK Drum Corps Champions
- Website: www.spiritofscotlandpipeband.com
- Sponsor: Glenfiddich

The Spirit of Scotland Pipe Band is a pipe band formed from top-class solo players.

== History ==
The idea of forming the band came about in 2007 at the Glenfiddich Piping Championships, one of the world's premier solo piping events. The name comes from the Glenfiddich Spirit of Scotland Awards.

It was formed over the winter of 2007-2008 under the leadership of Roddy MacLeod, and assigned immediately by the RSPBA to Grade 1. The leading drummer was John Fisher. The pipers had won between them 17 Highland Society of London gold medals.

It wore the Isle of Skye tartan, and was sponsored by Glenfiddich, McCallum Bagpipes and Premier Percussion.

Spirit of Scotland competed for the first at the 2008 World Pipe Band Championships, qualifying for the final and finishing in 11th place overall after one week of practice.

The band reformed in 2016 with leading drummer Jim Kilpatrick, who left Shotts and Dykehead Caledonia Pipe Band the previous season. A significant number of drummers from Shotts joined along with Kilpatrick. The availability of Kilpatrick, who has led the winning drum corps at the World Championships fifteen times, resulted in Macleod reforming the band to compete at all the major competitions in 2016.

== Players ==
As of March 2016, the band had 41 pipers and 21 drummers available to play.

Notable pipers include:

- Roddy MacLeod (2008 and 2016)
- Angus MacColl (2008 and 2016)
- Willie McCallum (2008 and 2016)
- Gordon Walker (2008 and 2016)
- Alasdair Gillies (2008)

Drummers:

- Jim Kilpatrick (2016)
- Barry Wilson (2016)
- Brenton Earl (2016)
