= Finlay MacDonald (musician) =

Scottish musician and composer (born 1978)

Finlay MacDonald (born 1978) is a Scottish musician and composer.

Finally MacDonald is a son of Scottish bagpiper Iain MacDonald (1950–2020). He was one of the first pipers to receive a BA in Scottish music and piping from the Royal Scottish Academy of Music and Drama. MacDonald is head of piping studies at the National Piping Centre in Glasgow. He founded his own band The Finlay MacDonald Band, which toured between 2006 and 2007 to highly positive reviews, though in recent years they have been inactive. Annually he works with Roddy MacLeod to organise the Piping Live! Festival.

He performed with Jay-Z, P Diddy and Alicia Keys in 2010 and later with Bryan Adams at the Glasgow Royal Concert Hall.

As well as musical collaborations and performances, MacDonald appeared in the Michael Keaton film A Shot at Glory.

In 2012, MacDonald was the co-star with Alastair Campbell in a Sky Arts documentary, First Love, in which he taught the former Labour Party strategist, who had learned the pipes as a child, to prepare for a major solo piping performance at the Royal Concert Hall in Glasgow. The experience rekindled Campbell's love of piping, and MacDonald has since become his tutor, and the pair have performed together at a number of events, including anti-Brexit rallies.

== Discography ==
- First O' the Darkenin 2004
