= Steven McWhirter =

North Irish pipe band drummer (born 1983)

- Born: 1983 (age 42–43); Ballymena, Northern Ireland
- Instrument: snare drum
- Website: stevenmcwhirter.com

Steven McWhirter is a pipe band drummer from Northern Ireland. He has won multiple world championship titles as a solo performer and as part of band. He is the lead drummer for the Inveraray & District Pipe Band.

== Life ==
McWhirter was born in Ballymena, Northern Ireland, in 1983.

== Career ==
=== Band career ===
He joined the Cullybackey Pipe Band in Northern Ireland in 1994, and also played with the Warrnambool & District Pipe Band in Australia. When he joined Cullybackey he played the tenor drum, before moving on to play the snare.

Cullybackey won the Grade 2 World Championships in 2002, and J. Reid Maxwell invited him to join the Simon Fraser University Pipe Band in British Columbia. He played with Simon Fraser University every summer until 2008, winning the Grade 1 World Drum Corps Championship in 2004 and 2008, as well as the overall world pipe band championships in 2008.

In 2008 he moved to Scotland to join the Inveraray & District Pipe Band as leading drummer. Inveraray won all five major championships in Grade 2 in 2009, and were promoted to Grade 1 for 2010. In 2014, Inveraray won its first Major at the European Championships, held in Forres.

=== Solo career ===
McWhirter won the under-15 World Solo Championships in 1997 and 1998, and the World Solo Drumming Championships in 2006, 2011, 2012, 2013, 2014, 2015, 2016, 2017, 2018, 2019, 2022 and 2024. He currently holds the record for most consecutive World Solo Drumming Championship wins.

He has taught at schools, including Dollar Academy and the Edinburgh Academy.
