= Robert Malcolm Memorial Pipe Band =

- Established: 1994
- Location: Burnaby, British Columbia
- Grade: 2, 3, 4, 5
- Pipe major: Jack Cairney (G2); Andrew Lee (G3); Alastair Lee (G4); Derek Milloy (G5)
- Tartan: Ancient Fraser
- Notable honours: Winner, World Pipe Band Championships 2006, P/M David Hilder D/S Andre Tessier (G2); Winner, World Pipe Band Championships 1999, P/M Ian Wallace D/S Cam Bullis (G3 Juvenile); Winner, World Pipe Band Championships 2001, P/M Alison Dunsire D/S Carly Coulson (G3 Juvenile); Winner, World Pipe Band Championships 2003, P/M Evan Stewart D/S Holly Tawse (G3 Juvenile); Winner, World Pipe Band Championships 2005, P/M Andrew Lee D/S Alex Munro (G3 Juvenile); Winner, World Pipe Band Championships 2012, P/M Rob Menzies D/S Gavin McRae (G3A); 3rd Place, World Pipe Band Championships 2012, P/M Jack Lee D/S Jake Mix (Novice)
- Website: www.rmmpipeband.com

The Robert Malcolm Memorial Pipe Band is an organization of four bands affiliated with the Simon Fraser University Pipe Band. Though one primary purpose of the bands is to act as a feeder for the Grade I SFU pipe band, the bands have proven themselves in their own right as highly competitive forces. The RMM bands are no longer classified as juvenile bands as of this year they lifted the age limit, people of all ages are now allowed to join the RMM Pipebands.

== History ==
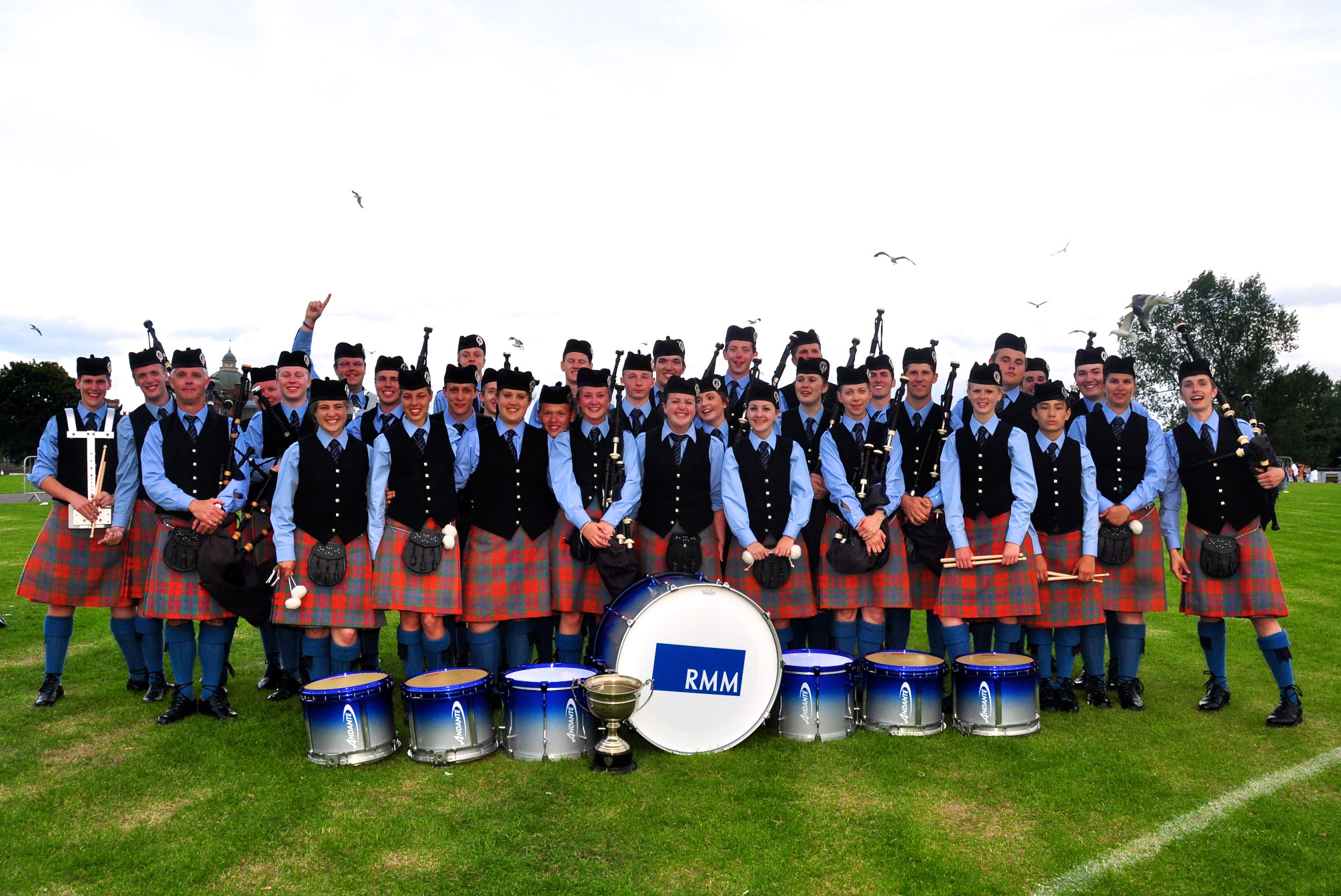
The Grade 3 band at the World Pipe Band Championships in Glasgow, 2012

As the Simon Fraser University Pipe Band entered the 1990s, the membership of the band began to teach younger players the art of piping and drumming. Two such teachers were Robert Barbulak and Malcolm Bokenfohr, who were killed in a car accident in 1993. In 1994 the Robert Malcolm Memorial Pipe Band was created to continue the development of younger players. The organization first fielded a Grade II pipe band in 1995, which saw local success immediately.

The Grade III (Juvenile) band was first competitive in 1996, after they had won at all but two of the ten British Columbia Pipers Association sanctioned games the previous year in grade IV and were upgraded. Pipers are under the instruction of Terry Lee and Jack Lee. Drumming instruction was provided by (in various years) Karen Perry, Reid Maxwell, Grant Maxwell, Steven MacWhirter, Andre Tessier, Tano Martone, Simone Reid, and Brittany Angeltvedt. After placing second in the World Championships in 1997, they returned every odd year to win the Juvenile category four consecutive times (1999, 2001, 2003, 2005). In August 2007 they placed second (behind George Watson's College of Edinburgh) and in August 2009, placed fourth.

Between 1996 and 2008 there were enough musicians in the organization to field bands in Grade II, III, and IV. A Grade V (or under grade) band was added for especially young players to give them opportunities to experience competition at a young age. In addition, the Robert Malcolm Memorial Alumni band was formed in 2002 for players who had aged out of the Juvenile bands but were not currently playing in the Grade II or I band (this band no longer exists).

== 2006 ==
The RMM Grade 2 band won the World Pipe Band Championships as well as the BCPA grand aggregate in 2006. RMM II won the aggregate of every highland games they entered within the BCPA (except the medley contest at the Pacific Northwest Scottish Highland Games, which they placed second), prompting the association to promote them to grade one.

After being promoted to Grade One, RMM II was advised by the SFUPB leadership to appeal for a down grade, which they did. At the same time that the appeal was made, the Pipe Major, Pipe Sergeant, and Drum Sergeant of RMM2 concurrently resigned. Terry Lee later stated to the band members that "the system in place" was "never mandated to form an RMM I", and dissolved RMM II. The SFU Pipe Band Organization and Maple Ridge Pipe Band then entered into a strategic relationship, with Maple Ridge becoming the bridge between RMM III and SFUPB. RMM II members were given the option of joining the MRPB, or starting their own autonomous band. Maple Ridge Pipe Band is now called New Westminster Police Pipe Band.

== 2007 ==
On January 4, 2007, the former Pipe Major, Pipe Sergeant and Drum Sergeant of RMM2, along with the majority of the former members of RMM2, joined the Triumph Street Pipe Band. After this event the RMM Pipeband teamed up with grade 2 band New Westminster Police Pipeband. They now act as the grade 2 band in the organization, but they maintain their own name.

== 2012 ==
For the first time, the RMM organization sent the Grade 4 band as well as the Grade 3 band to compete at the World Pipe Band Championships. The grade 4 band won the qualifier in Novice Juvenile and placed 3rd in the final. The Grade 3 band competed in 3A for the first time in the history of the organization, and won. Robert Malcolm Memorial Grade 3 pipe band became the 2012 Grade 3A World Pipe Band Champions.

2012 was also the first year since 2008 when the Simon Fraser University Pipe Band organization fielded competition bands at every level of competition, with a Grade V, IV, III, II (New Westminster Police), and I band.

The RMM3 band was in October 2012 regraded by the Royal Scottish Pipe Band Association to grade 2 level. The band has renamed to RMM2.
