= Jim Kilpatrick =

Scottish pipe band drummer

Jim Kilpatrick MBE
- Born: 11 August 1956 (age 69); Whitburn, West Lothian
- Instrument: Snare drum
- Website: www.jimkilpatrick.co.uk

Jim Kilpatrick MBE (born 11 August 1956) is a Scottish pipe band drummer, and leading drummer of the Spirit of Scotland Pipe Band. He has won numerous drumming titles as both a solo drummer and in pipe band competitions, enjoying his greatest competitive success with the Shotts and Dykehead Caledonia Pipe Band.

== Life ==
Kilpatrick was born in Whitburn, West Lothian on 11 August 1956, and started playing the snare drum at the age of 9 or 10.

His partner Fiona Cruickshank was pipe major of the Deeside Ladies Pipe Band. His uncle Tom Brown is also a pipe band drummer, and was leading drummer of Boghall and Bathgate Caledonia Pipe Band until he was succeeded by his son Gordon, who is Kilpatrick's cousin.

He was awarded an MBE in 2003 for "services to music."

== Career ==
At the age of 12 he joined his first band, in Grade 1. In 1971, at the age of 15, he joined the Shotts and Dykehead Caledonia Pipe Band, which was at the time under the leadership of Alex Duthart. He left to become leading drummer of Polkemmet Pipe Band in 1980, along with Robert Mathieson who also came from Shotts at the same time to become pipe major. Kilpatrick became leading drummer of Shotts in 1986.

He has won the drumming title at the World Pipe Band Championships nineteen times, fifteen of those as leading drummer. This includes a run of eleven consecutive times between 1988 and 1998, a record which still stands. In 1991, Shotts won the drumming title in all five major championships, the only time this has occurred.

Kilpatrick was suspended in 2012 for comments made on Facebook about the result the band received at the British Championships. This led to the resignation of pipe major Gavin Walker and the band withdrawing from all competition for the rest of the season, including the World Championships.

In 2015, Shotts won the World Championships for the first time in ten years, breaking a run of four consecutive victories by Field Marshal Montgomery Pipe Band. In October 2015, a statement released by Shotts and Dykehead Pipe Band reported that Kilpatrick had agreed to step down and retire from his position as leading drummer, and that corps member Blair Brown would be his replacement. The statement offered from the band did not include any quotations directly attributed to Kilpatrick. In his own statement, released on 17 October 2015, Kilpatrick stated that his removal from the band was "the final act in a long-running, premeditated and well-planned coup d’état orchestrated by Ryan Canning, Blair Brown, Glenn Brown and perhaps three other members of the Shotts band."

In 2016, Kilpatrick became leading drummer of the Spirit of Scotland Pipe Band, which was reformed to compete for the 2016 season. He has stated that this will be his final season of competition.

Kilpatrick also competes in solo events, and has won the World Solo Drumming Championships a record sixteen times. He has been involved in teaching at the Royal Conservatoire of Scotland, as well as giving masterclasses around the world.
