= Alan Bevan =

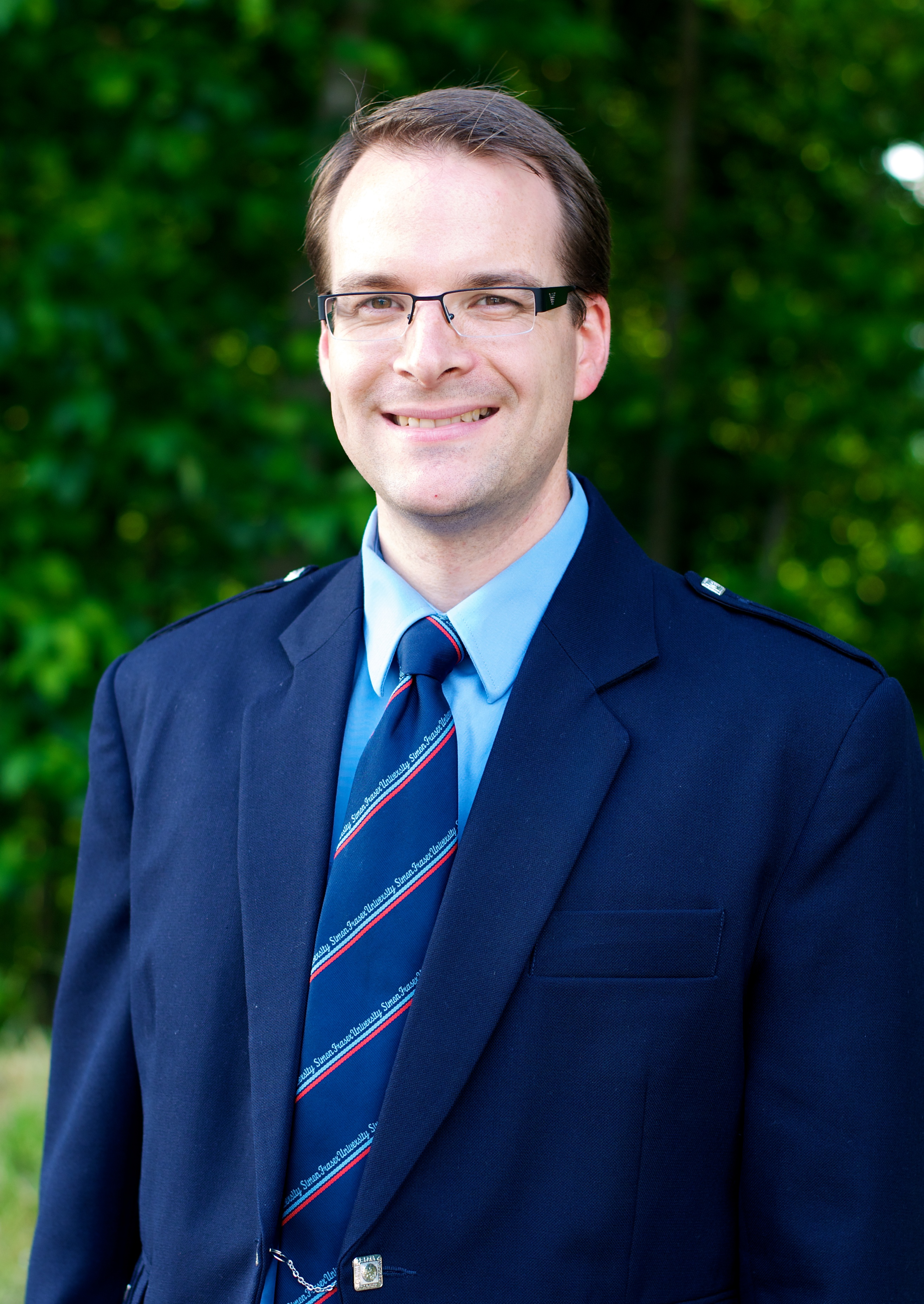

Background information
- Occupation: Lawyer
- Instrument: Bagpipes

Alan Bevan is a piper and current pipe major of the Simon Fraser University Pipe Band.

== Life ==
Before joining the Simon Fraser University band in 1995, he was pipe major of the Grade 1 Abbotsford Police Pipe Band.

Bevan graduated from Simon Fraser University in 1999, and is a practising lawyer.

His wife Bonnie and his two sons, Alastair and Callum also play in the band.

Bevan took over as pipe major of Simon Fraser University when Terry Lee stepped down as pipe major in 2013, after 36 years in the role. Terry's brother Jack Lee continues to act as pipe sergeant of the band.

== Solo career ==
He won the Gold Medal at the Northern Meeting in Inverness in 2008, and at the Argyllshire Gathering in 2013.
