= McCallum Bagpipes =

Scottish business

McCallum Bagpipes Limited
- Company type: Private
- Industry: Bagpiping
- Founded: 1998; 27 years ago in Kilmarnock, East Ayrshire, Scotland
- Founders: Stuart McCallum; Kenny MacLeod
- Key people: Stuart McCallum (Director); Kenny MacLeod (Director)
- Owner: Stuart McCallum
- Number of employees: 34
- Website: mccallumbagpipes.com

McCallum Bagpipes Limited is a company that manufactures Great Highland bagpipes. Founded in 1998, it is based in Kilmarnock, Scotland. The company has worked with bagpiper Willie McCallum to design several products.

== History ==
McCallum Bagpipes was founded by Stuart McCallum and Kenny MacLeod in 1998. McCallum began manufacturing bagpipes after MacLeod suggested he create a practice chanter, and eventually, a set of bagpipes. After creating that first set, McCallum and MacLeod founded McCallum Bagpipes Limited and began manufacturing further sets of bagpipes.

McCallum previously worked for McCrindles Tooling for many years. He used his knowledge of CNC machining to create his own process of manufacturing bagpipes, and strays away from the traditional methods in many ways. Using CNC processes allows McCallum Bagpipes to manufacture bagpipes quickly and consistently. This has also allowed the company to become the highest-volume bagpipe manufacturer in the world, producing 40 sets of bagpipes per week.

== Bagpipes ==
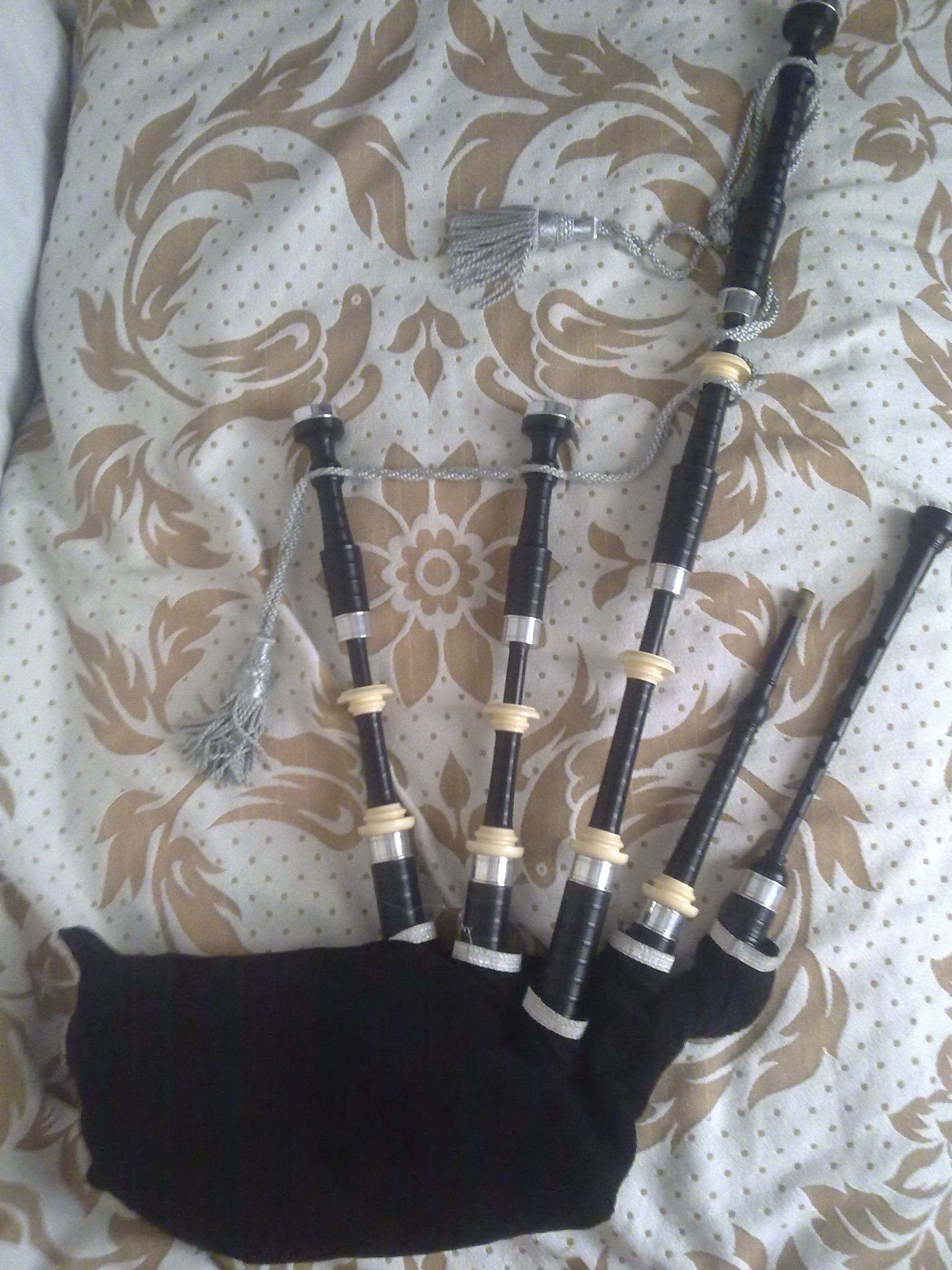
McCallum P2

McCallum Bagpipes manufactures bagpipes in African Blackwood and Black Acetyl. The entire manufacturing process is done at the company's factory. Because every part is manufactured on a programmable CNC machine, changes can be made easily to individual sets of bagpipes based on customer requests or design changes. The company also produces practice chanters, bagpipe chanters, bags, and bag hardware.

In 2015, NASA astronaut Kjell N. Lindgren played a set of McCallum bagpipes on the International Space Station. The company made a set of plastic bagpipes specifically for him so they could be easily sanitised and transported to the ISS.

Red Hot Chilli Pipers founder Stuart Cassells uses a special chanter manufactured by McCallum Bagpipes, which uses flute keys instead of the normal holes. This allows him to play the bagpipes having focal dystonia in his right hand.

The MacLeod Ale Brewing Company had McCallum Bagpipes manufacture custom plastic drones to serve as tap handles in their brewery located in Van Nuys, California.

== Reeds ==
McCallum Bagpipes also works with Rory Grossart to make chanter reeds and drone reeds. These instruments are both made of cane, but the company also offer drone reeds made of other synthetic materials.
