= J. Reid Maxwell =

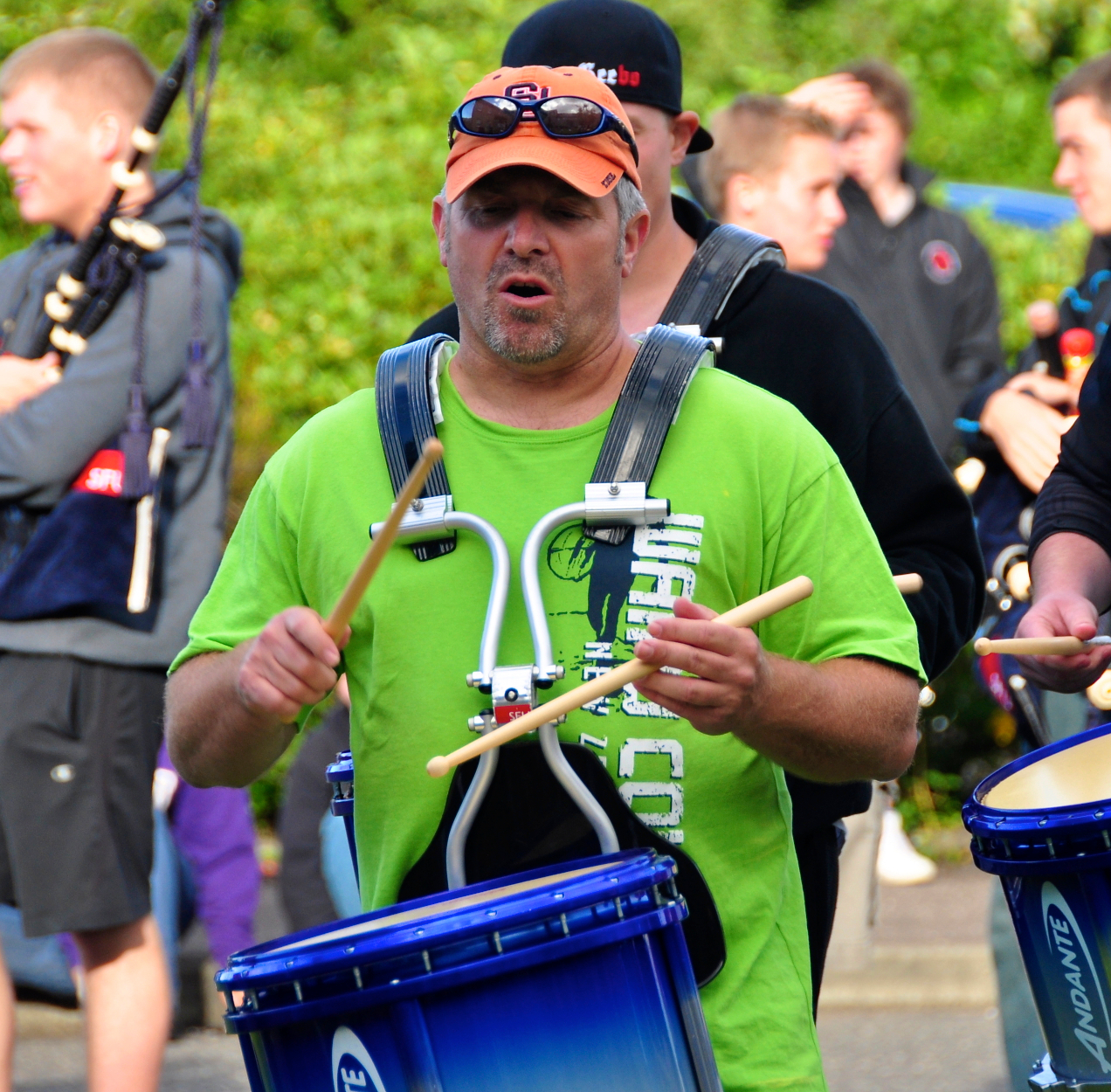
- Maxwell at an SFU practice

Background information
- Born: January 29, 1961 (age 65)
- Instrument: Snare Drum

John Reid Maxwell (born 29 January 1961) is a pipe band drummer and current leading drummer of the Simon Fraser University Pipe Band. Maxwell is the first person to have led the drum corps of two different bands to victory at the World Pipe Band Championships.

== Life ==
Maxwell was born in Kirkcaldy and raised in Bowhill, Cardenden, Fife, Scotland, and moved to Canada when he was 20.

== Band career ==
As a teenager, he won the World Pipe Band Championships twice and the World Drum Corps Championships with the Dysart and Dundonald Pipe Band.

He was leading drummer of the 78th Fraser Highlanders Pipe Band when it won the World Championships in 1987, becoming the first pipe band based outside of Scotland to do so.

In 1992, the Simon Fraser University Pipe Band (SFUPB) reckoned that their drumming could be improved and invited Maxwell to join. Subsequently, the SFUPB won the World Championships a total of seven times.

Maxwell has been involved in teaching members of the Simon Fraser University Pipe Band, and in the system of feeder bands that make up the Robert Malcolm Memorial Pipe Band. Maxwell helped start the "Piping Hot Summer Drummer" instructional program in 1994 as a drumming-only school. It has now been running for more than twenty years as a summer camp for pipers, drummers and highland dancers of all ages and levels.

In New Zealand, he has taught many drummers and judged competitions.

In 2015 he received a BC Community Achievement Award.
