= Boghall =

Coordinates: 55.897°N 03.608°W

Boghall: Scottish Gaelic: Bogail; Scots: Boghauch
- Council Estate / Village
- Location within West Lothian
- OS grid reference: NS994682
- Civil parish: Bathgate
- Council area: West Lothian
- Lieutenancy area: West Lothian
- Country: Scotland
- Sovereign state: United Kingdom
- Post town: BATHGATE
- Postcode district: EH48
- Dialling code: 01506
- Police: Scotland
- Fire: Scottish
- Ambulance: Scottish
- UK Parliament: Bathgate and Linlithgow
- Scottish Parliament: Linlithgow

Boghall is a Council Estate built in the early 1960s in West Lothian, Scotland just to the east of Bathgate.

Boghall has a range of amenities including a community centre, post office, 3 Corner Shops, a Scotmid supermarket, pharmacy, and a chip shop. Party In The Park, a small local festival, is held here each year in September. In the middle of the estate is the Boghall Parish Church of Scotland, which offers weekly worship as well as various activities during the week in the Church hall. Boghall is found just on Puir Wives' Brae, which is part of the Bathgate Hills. Boghall also has a park called Kirkton Park with a tennis court. Just outside of Boghall is the Pyramids business park along with a Toby Carvery, a Premier Inn hotel. The Boghall and Bathgate Caledonia Pipe Band is based in the area.

== Health and Education ==
Boghall is home to the primary schools St Columba RC Primary and Boghall Primary. The Secondary school Bathgate Academy is located to South West of Boghall.

== Healthcare ==
Boghall contains a NHS wellbeing hub and the Dunamis Pharmacy, the nearest GP surgery is in Bathgate.
