= Alex Duthart =

Scottish drummer

- Born: 7 October 1925; Cambusnethan
- Died: 27 November 1986 (aged 61); New York City
- Occupation: Blacksmith
- Instrument(s): Snare Drum, Drum Kit

Alex Duthart (7 October 1925 – 27 November 1986) was a Scottish drummer. He is widely regarded as having revolutionised pipe band snare drum playing.

== Life ==
Duthart was born on 7 October 1925 in Cambusnethan, near Wishaw in North Lanarkshire. His father John Duthart was an Ulsterman who worked as a blacksmith, and had played both the bass and snare drums for the 8th Argyll and Sutherland Highlanders during the First World War.

For most of his life Duthart lived in Newmains, near where he was born, and worked as a blacksmith in the steel works at Motherwell.

With his wife Cathie he had three sons and one daughter. Two of his children are drummers; Drew Duthart is the leading drummer of the 78th Fraser Highlanders Pipe Band and John Duthart is a kit drummer.

Duthart was awarded the title of Drum Major by the Royal Scottish Pipe Band Association for being the principal drumming instructor in the association.

== Band career ==
After being taught by his father from a young age, Alex joined the Craigneuk Parish Church Juvenile pipe band at the age of 12, and then the Home Guard Pipe Band (later known as the Dalzell Highland Pipe Band) in 1942. His elder brother John also played the pipes in the Home Guard band.

Alex became leading drummer of the Dalzell Highland Pipe Band in 1949, and led the Dalzell band to first place for drumming at the World Pipe Band Championships in 1953. Later that year he left Dalzell to focus on playing the drum kit for local big bands.

In 1957, John K. McAllister, pipe major of Shotts and Dykehead Caledonia Pipe Band, approached Duthart to request assistance with the formation of a drum corps, with the World Championships twelve weeks away. Duthart managed to create a drum corps that won the drumming title at the Worlds that year, and Shotts also won the overall title, as it did in 1958, 1959 and 1960.

Duthart stayed with Shotts until 1982, with the exception of the years 1964 to 1967, when he led the Invergordon Distillery Pipe Band, and 1968 to 1969, when he led the Edinburgh City Police Pipe Band. With both of those bands Duthart won the drumming title at the World Championships, in 1966 and 1967 with Invergordon Distillery, and with Edinburgh Police in 1968. Duthart was succeeded as leading drummer of Shotts by Willie Stevenson, who led the Shotts drumming corps to first place at the Worlds in 1969. After this, Stevenson invited Duthart to return as leading drummer, with Duthart leading the band to first place again in 1970.

In 1982, Duthart joined the British Caledonian Airways Pipe Band, while playing for this band he suffered a fatal heart attack while lined up to play in the Macy's Thanksgiving Day Parade in New York City on 27 November 1986.

== Musical style ==
Duthart pioneered a new style of pipe band drumming at a time when pipe bands were becoming more adventurous in their musical selections. Duthart was also known for his drum salutes, introducing elements such as back-sticking and stick clicking to pipe band drumming.

He cited as musical influences Alex D. Hamilton, a drum major in the Seaforth Highlanders, Jimmy Catherwood, leading drummer of the Dalzell Highland Pipe Band at the time Alex joined, Paddy Donovan, a pipe band drummer from Dublin, and Alex McCormick of the Glasgow Police Pipe Band. Duthart met Dr. Fritz Berger from Switzerland, embracing the Basel style of drumming as well as the Swiss-style snare drum notation, utilizing non-mainstream notation of using only one line, with right hand stickings written above and left hand stickings written below that line. He also listened to jazz, and met and exchanged ideas with Joe Morello.

== Teaching ==
Alex was engaged in teaching all around the world, giving classes and demonstrations as well as co-authoring two tutorial books on pipe-band drumming under his own name, containing many drum scores, variations of which are still played today.

Among his pupils was Jim Kilpatrick, former leading drummer of Shotts and Dykehead Caledonia and sixteen-time winner of the World Solo Drumming Championships, and his son Drew Duthart, the current leading drummer of 78th Fraser Highlanders Pipe Band.
