= Pipesdrums Magazine =

Publication for Highland pipers and pipe band drummers

pipes|drums magazine
- Editor: Andrew Berthoff
- Categories: bagpiping, pipe bands, Celtic music
- Frequency: Online-only
- First issue: November, 1995
- Company: GHB Communications
- Country: Canada
- Language: English
- Website: pipesdrums.com

pipes|drums is an independent, not-for-profit publication for Highland pipers and pipe band drummers. A combination of free and subscription-based content, the site is one of the world's most frequented news and features outlet serving piping and drumming.

pipes|drums started in 1995 as "Piper & Drummer Online," one of the first significant websites for the Scottish musical arts. The site was originally an independent offshoot of the Piper & Drummer, a quarterly print publication produced by the Pipers & Pipe Band Society of Ontario until March 2006. The online magazine serves the world competing piping and drumming community of approximately 75,000, according to a recent estimate conducted by the National Piping Centre in Glasgow, Scotland.

pipes|drums is cited as a source in numerous scholarly works, including Dr. William Donaldson's seminal book, The Highland Pipe and Scottish Society. The magazine constitutes a large online repository of articles on piping and drumming in the world. pipes|drums has provided fodder for stories in, among other media outlets, BBC News, The Scotsman, and telegraph.co.uk.
