= John D. Burgess =

Pipe Major John Davie Burgess MBE
- Born: 11 March 1934; Aberdeen, Scotland
- Died: 29 June 2005 (aged 71) Inverness, Scotland
- Instrument: Bagpipes
- Website: https://pmjohndburgess.com/

John Davie Burgess MBE (11 March 1934 – 29 June 2005) was a Scottish bagpipe player.

== Life ==
He was born in Aberdeen on 11 March 1934, and first learned to play the practice chanter at the age of four from his father John, who was also a piper.

The family moved to Edinburgh when the elder John took up a lecturing position at the Veterinary School. John D. was educated Edinburgh Academy, and tutored by Pipe major Willie Ross of the Army School of Bagpipe Music and Highland Drumming at Edinburgh Castle. He did not play in the school band, for fear that it would damage his technique.

In 1950 he became the youngest ever winner of the gold medals for piobaireachd at both the Argyllshire Gathering in Oban and the Northern Meeting in Inverness, at the age of 16. He initially intended to pursue piping as a hobby, and pursue a career training horses, but he went on a tour of Canada and the United States with Willie Ross in 1952. Burgess was persuaded by Brigadier Alistair MacLean at the Castle to join the Queen's Own Cameron Highlanders as a piper, and spent three years there, reaching the rank of corporal. His choice of regiment did not please Ross, who wanted him to join the Scots Guards.

Burgess then joined the Edinburgh City Police, and became pipe major of that band in 1957.

Between 1962 and 1965, he was pipe major of the 4th/5th Battalion Cameron Highlanders TA Pipe Band. He then moved to Invergordon in 1966, and played with the Invergordon Distillery Pipe Band for two years, until it was disbanded in 1967.

Burgess became a teacher and judge after retiring from competitive playing in around 1979, teaching in schools around Easter Ross. He was awarded an MBE in 1988 for services to piping.

He died on 29 June 2005, and was survived by his wife Sheila and their son, John, and daughter, Margaret.

== Recordings ==
John D. Burgess made several recordings.

- King of Highland Pipers
- Art of the Bagpipe
- Ceol Mor agus Ceol Beag
- Art of the Highland Bagpipe Vol. 1
- Art of the Highland Bagpipe Vol. 2
- Art of the Highland Bagpipe Vol. 3
- King of the Highland Pipers
- Piping Centre 1996 Vol. 2
- Piping at the Edinburgh Academy
- John D. - A One Off

His track The Wandering Piper as was included by Topic Records in their 70th anniversary album Three Score and Ten.
