= Inveraray & District Pipe Band =

Grade 1 pipe band from Scotland

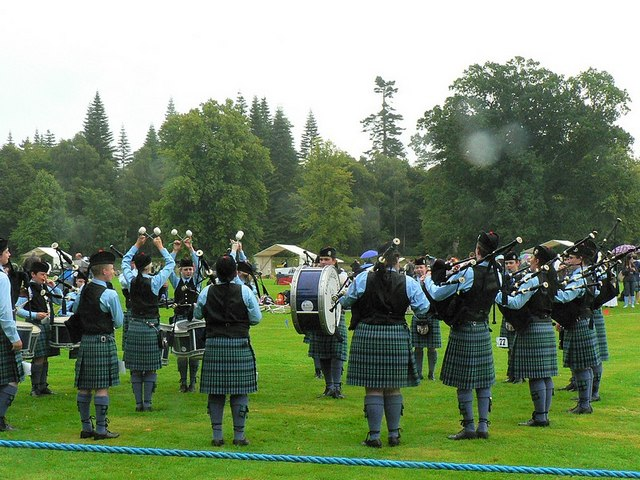
- Established: 2005
- Location: Inveraray, Scotland
- Grade: 1
- Pipe major: Stuart Liddell
- Drum major: Liam Renton
- Drum sergeant: Steven McWhirter
- Tartan: Ancient MacCallum
- Notable honours: RSPBA Champion of Champions 2007 (Nov), 2008 (Juv), 2009 (Gd 2), 2016 & CoC Drum Corps, 2017 & CoC Drum Corps, 2018, 2019 & CoC Drum Corps, 2022 CoC Drum Corps, 2023, 2024 & CoC Drum Corps, 2025 World Championships 2007 (Nov), 2008 (Juv), 2009 (Gd 2), 2017 & Drums, 2019, 2024, 2025 & Drums Cowal Championships 2007 (Nov), 2008 (Juv), 2009 (Gd 2), 2013 Drums European Championships 2008 (Juv), 2009 (Gd 2), 2014, 2016 Drums, 2017 & Drums, 2018, 2019 & Drums, 2022 & Drums, 2023, 2025 & Drums British Championships 2007 (Nov), 2008 (Juv), 2009 (Gd 2), 2016 & Drums, 2017, 2018 Drums, 2022 & Drums Scottish Championships 2007 (Nov), 2009 (Gd 2), 2016 & Drums, 2017, 2019, 2022 Drums, 2023 Drums, 2024 & Drums United Kingdom Championships 2022 Drums, 2024 Drums
- Website: www.idpb.co.uk

Inveraray and District Pipe Band is a Grade 1 pipe band based in Inveraray, Scotland.

== History ==
Stuart Liddell, a native of Argyll and one of the world's top solo players began coaching youngsters at Inveraray Primary School in 2003, and registered the band in 2005 with the RSPBA. Liddell believed the community could support a thriving competitive pipe band, even though the region's last pipe band had disbanded in the 1930s.

The band's first competition was at the 2005 Cowal Gathering. Using borrowed drums and their own kilts, the group finished 13th of 19 in the Novice Juvenile division. In 2006, the band finished in the top 6 at all major competitions in Novice Juvenile, and in 2007 won 4 out of 5 majors and the Champion of Champions award. In 2008, the band won the World Championships, Cowal Championships and Champion of Champions in the Juvenile division, and were promoted to Grade 2.

In 2009, the band won all five major Grade 2 contests (Scottish, British, European, World and Cowal Championships), and were promoted to Grade 1.

In 2010, the band's first year in Grade 1, they placed 8th in the Scottish Championships, 7th in the British Championships, 8th in the European Championships, 8th and 9th for 9th overall at the World Pipe Band Championships, and 5th at the Cowal Championships.

In 2013, the band was placed 3rd in the British Championships, 2nd in the European Championships, 3rd in the Scottish Championships, 2nd and 4th in the World Championships and 5th at Cowal. In 2014, the band won its first Major at the European Championships, held in Forres, and was placed second in the World Championships. In 2015 Inveraray was 3rd at the World Championships, and a close 2nd in 2016 behind Field Marshal Montgomery Pipe Band. Inveraray won their first World Championships in Grade 1 in 2017, finishing seven points ahead of Field Marshal Montgomery who placed 2nd. The band also won the World Championships in 2019, 2024, and 2025.

== Band ==
The Pipe Major and founder of the band is Stuart Liddell, and the Pipe Sergeant is Alasdair Henderson. The Drum Sergeant is Steven McWhirter, and the Band Manager is Jim McMillan.

The band disbanded the juvenile band in 2013.

== Pipe Majors ==
- Stuart Liddell (2005- )

== Pipe Sergeants ==
- Dougie Campbell (2005-2013)
- Alasdair Henderson (2014- )

== Leading Drummers ==
- Graeme McMillan (2005 - 2008)
- Steven McWhirter (2008 - )

== Discography ==
- Ascension (2013)
- A Night in that Land (2022)
