= Scottish Piping Society of London =

The Scottish Piping Society of London
- Official logo
- Formation: 1932
- Legal status: Active
- Purpose: Promoting bagpiping heritage.
- Location: London
- Official language: English
- President: Michael Fitzhenry
- Vice President: Fraser Stewart
- Treasurer: Andrew Hall
- Secretary: Alison Gilmour
- Website: Scottish Piping Society of London Official Website

The Scottish Piping Society of London is a Society of bagpipers, formed in 1932. The Society aims to support and promote the heritage of Scottish Highland bagpiping.

Since 1932 the Society has held an annual competition, with the original event consisting of the ceol mor (piobaireachd), and ceol beag, as well as two dancing events. Previous annual competitions have been held at venues including Kensington Town Hall, Glazier's Hall and Hampton Court. The current home of the annual competition is The Caledonian Club in Belgravia (London). The historic competition is a prestigious annual event in the solo piping calendar, attracting the top solo bagpipers from across the world to competition each November. The highest honour is the Bratach Gorm event, which is only available to those who have won the Highland Society of London's Gold Medal at the Argyllshire Gathering (Oban) or the Northern Meeting (Inverness) or former winners of the Gillies Cup. The last competitor to win the Bratach Gorm (2019) was Callum Beaumont.

As well as the annual competition, the Society runs member competitions, recitals and a 'Strictly Come Piping' social event each December. Additionally, the Society runs the piping events at the Harpenden Highland Games each September.

The society has over 200 members. Iverach McDonald was amongst its notable alumni.
