= The National Youth Pipe Band of Scotland =

Scottish pipe band

National Youth Pipe Band of Scotland
- Pipe Band
- Short name: NYPBoS
- Founded: 2003
- Location: Scotland
- Music director: Steven Blake
- Website: https://www.nypbs.co.uk/

The National Youth Pipe Band of Scotland (NYPBoS) is a youth pipe band headed by Steven Blake, consisting of over 100 members who teach and perform around the British isles.

The band was founded in 2003 as part of the National Piping Centre in Glasgow and features pipers and drummers between the ages of ten and twenty five. Their structure currently consists of three bands, the Junior Band, the Development Band and the Senior Band.

== Performances ==
In 2010 they recorded the official soundtrack for the handover of the Commonwealth Games from Delhi to Glasgow. In 2012 they performed for Queen Elizabeth II on her receipt of the keys to the city of Perth.

In 2017, the band made pipe band history by being the first full pipe band ensemble to perform the infamous "Thunderstruck" suite by Gordon Duncan, at their concert of the same name.

In 2023, the band celebrated their 20th anniversary with a concert at the Usher Hall in Edinburgh. The band was accompanied by guests Ross Ainslie and Ali Hutton. It was the first concert performance of the newly created Junior Band.

== Directors ==
- Paul Warren (2003-2008)
- Alasdair McLaren (2008-2020)
- Steven Blake (2020-present)

== Notable alumni ==
Former members of the band include BBC Radio Scotland Young Traditional Musician finalist Pipe Major Ross Miller and Gold Medal winning piper Connor Sinclair.
