= Torphichen and Bathgate Pipe Band =

Pipe band from West Lothian, Scotland

- Established: 1902
- Grade: 2
- Pipe major: William Brown
- Drum sergeant: Callum Firth
- Tartan: Isle of Skye
- Website: www.torphichenandbathgate.com

Torphichen and Bathgate Pipe Band are based in West Lothian, Scotland and compete at the Royal Scottish Pipe Band Association's Grade 2 level.

== History ==
The band was founded in 1902 as the Torphichen Pipe Band.

In the 1960s the band changed from the Green Hunting Stewart to the Bruce tartan, and in 1986 from the Bruce to the current Modern Skye. In 1989 the band won every major championship in Grade 2 and was promoted the next year to Grade 1, but the band was swiftly demoted to Grade 2 before being promoted again in 1994.

The band lasted until 1996 before it stopped competing, until in 2003 Gordon Stafford was appointed pipe major for the second time, and in 2008 the band won the Champion of Champions in grade 2 in both piping and drumming, and was consequently promoted to Grade 1. After Gordon Stafford left the band in 2009, Stuart Shedden took over as pipe major for the 2010 season. In 2011 a band in the Novice Juvenile band was created, and the band changed its tartan from Modern Skye to Isle of Skye in 2012.

The band was demoted to Grade 2 after the 2013 season, but went on to win the Grade 2 World Championships in 2014. Pipe sergeant William Brown took over as pipe major at the end of the 2014 season.

== Discography ==
- The Curse of Uluru: Live and in Concert (2006)
