= Shotts and Dykehead Caledonia Pipe Band =

Scottish pipe band

- Established: 1910
- Location: North Lanarkshire, Scotland
- Grade: 1
- Pipe major: Emmett Conway
- Drum sergeant: David Henderson
- Tartan: MacLean of Duart
- Notable honours: Winner, World Pipe Band Championships: 1948, 1952, 1957, 1958, 1959, 1960, 1970, 1973, 1974, 1980, 1994, 1997, 2000, 2003, 2005, 2015
- Website: shottspipeband.com

The Shotts and Dykehead Caledonia Pipe Band is a grade 1 pipe band from Shotts, in the North Lanarkshire region of Scotland. The band has won the World Pipe Band Championships sixteen times. The current pipe major is Emmett Conway.

== History ==
The Shotts and Dykehead Caledonia Pipe Band was formed in 1910 by Pipe Major Dugald MacFarlane. The band purchased its first uniform with kilts of the McKenzie tartan in 1914, but despite entering many competitions, the band did not attain competitive success until Pipe Major Tom McAllister took the lead role in 1929. In 1935 the band won the Grade 2 world championship, and were upgraded to Grade 1 for the 1936 season, when they won the British Championship on the first attempt. After a suspension of competitions during the Second World War, the band won the World Championships in 1948 and 1952 under Tom McAllister, for a total of 21 major championships during his leadership of the band.

Tom McAllister's son John Kerr McAllister took over as pipe major in 1954, in partnership with leading drummer Alex Duthart. Under this leadership, the band won four consecutive World Championships, between 1957 and 1960, setting a record for the time. After losing several members, including Alex Duthart, and not competing in 1963, Willie Stevenson was appointed as leading drummer and the band resumed competition in 1964.

John Kerr McAllister retired in 1968, having led the band to 26 major championship victories, to be succeeded by his younger brother Tom McAllister Junior. Alex Duthart returned in 1970, and in the next twelve years before Tom retired the band won a further 23 major championships, including the 1980 World Championships. Alex retired in 1982 and Tom in 1984, and were succeeded by leading drummer John Scullion and pipe major James A. Bell. At the end of 1986, Robert Mathieson and Jim Kilpatrick, former members of the band, took over as pipe major and leading drummer respectively. The band won 30 major championships under Mathieson, who retired at the end of 2010 to be replaced by Gavin Walker.

Following the unexpected resignation of Gavin Walker just prior to the 2012 World Championships, Ryan Canning was appointed as the new pipe major of the band. The band did not, however, compete in the World Championships that year, partially due to Kilpatrick's suspension by the RSPBA over a comment posted on Facebook.

In 2013, the band announced the end of its decade long sponsorship from The House of Edgar and the name reverted to Shotts and Dykehead Caledonia Pipe Band.

In 2015, Shotts won the World Championships again, the first major championship won under Canning and the first victory by a Scottish band since Shotts won the title in 2005. Kilpatrick left the band in October 2015, a statement from the band reported that Kilpatrick had agreed to step down and retire from his position as leading drummer, and that corps member Blair Brown would be his replacement. but in his own statement Kilpatrick stated that his removal from the band was "the final act in a long-running, premeditated and well-planned coup d’état orchestrated by Ryan Canning, Blair Brown, Glenn Brown and perhaps three other members of the Shotts band." Emmett Conway took over as pipe major of the band in late 2018.

The band has performed in many Pre-Worlds concerts, in 2001, 2008, 2017 and 2025.

== Pipe Majors ==
- Dugald MacFarlane (1910–1929)
- Tom MacAllister Sr. (1929–1954)
- J.K. MacAllister (1954–1968)
- Tom MacAllister Jr. (1968–1984)
- James A. Bell (1984–1986)
- Robert Mathieson (1986–2010)
- Gavin Walker (2010–2012)
- Ryan Canning (2012–2018)
- Emmett Conway (2018– )

== Leading Drummers ==
- George Crawford
- Willie (Teddy) Gilchrist (?-1949)
- John Kirkwood (1949–1953)
- John Kerr (1953–1955)
- Alex Duthart (1957–1963)
- Willie Stevenson (1963–1970)
- Alex Duthart (1970–1982)
- John Scullion (1982–1986)
- Arthur Cook (1986)
- Jim Kilpatrick (1986–2015)
- Andrew Lawson (2015–2023)
- Grant Cassidy (2023 - 2025)
- David Henderson (2025 - present)

== Discography ==
- World Champions (1960)
- Champions Supreme (1965)
- The Covenanter (1968)
- Parade of the Pipes (1970)
- Pipes & Drums (1970)
- Bagpipes, Brass & Accordion (1971)
- The Shores of Loch Katrine (1974)
- Bagpipe Marches and Music of Scotland (1976)
- Shotts & Dykehead Caledonia Pipe Band (1976)
- Champion of Champions (1981)
- Another Quiet Sunday (1992)
- By the Waters Edge (1994)
- The Pipe Major's Choice (1999)
- La Boum Ecosse (2001)
- Legendary House of Edgar Shotts & Dykehead Caledonia Pipe Band (2005)
- Rise (2018)
