= ScottishPower Pipe Band =

Scottish pipe band

- Established: 1969
- Location: Glasgow, Scotland
- Grade: 1
- Pipe major: Chris Armstrong
- Drum sergeant: Jake Jørgensen
- Tartan: ScottishPower
- Notable honours: World Championships: G2 - 1977; British Championships: G1 - 2018
- Website: www.scottishpowerpipeband.com
- Sponsor: ScottishPower

The ScottishPower Pipe Band is a Grade 1 pipe band sponsored by the energy company ScottishPower. The band held a sponsorship deal with British Caledonian Airways from 1969 to 1989.

== History ==
The band was formed in 1969 after a sponsorship deal with British Caledonian Airways and so took their name. The band won the Grade 2 World Pipe Band Championships in 1977.

The following year, they were promoted to Grade 1 and added Gatwick to their name, British Caledonian Airways (Gatwick) Pipe Band. The band wore the Ancient Caledonia tartan. During its time as the British Caledonian Airways (Gatwick) Pipe Band, the met and played for many famous people including Idi Amin, Pope John Paul II and Bob Hope whilst also playing in places such as Dubai, United States, Ivory Coast, France, Singapore, Uganda, Hong Kong and Taiwan

In 1988, British Caledonian Airways took away their sponsorship of the band and in 1989, the band became known as Power of Scotland after a sponsorship deal with the energy company ScottishPower was founded. In the early 1990s, the band changed their name to its current name, ScottishPower.

In 1995, with a new Pipe Major, Roddy McLeod, the band switched from their original and distinct Ancient Caledonia kilt to the newly developed corporate ScottishPower tartan.

With their new ScottishPower sponsorship, the band has played for Her Majesty Queen Elizabeth II at Braemar and at the 75th Royal Variety Performance in Edinburgh. The band has also played at many high profile events including the Lord Mayor's Show and the Vatican’s Christmas Concert. Also, they have played with Sir Paul McCartney at the Scottish Exhibition and Conference Centre.

The band has performed twice at the Pre-Worlds concert, in 2011 with Energy and 2019 with SP+R.

The ScottishPower Pipe Band is currently led by Pipe Major Chris Armstrong and Leading Drummer Jake Jørgensen.

== Pipe Majors ==
- Iain MacLeod (1969–1971)
- John Roe (1971–1973)
- Robert (Bob) Richardson (1973–1982)
- Harry McNulty (1982–1992)
- Hugh MacInnes (1992–1995)
- Roddy MacLeod (1995–2006)
- Chris Armstrong (2006-)

== Leading drummers ==
- Davie Bruce (1975–1978)
- Bob Turner (1978–1982)
- Alex Duthart (1982–1986)
- Eric Ward (1986–1991)
- John Scullion (1991–2002)
- Barry Wilson (2002–2014)
- Jake Jørgensen (2014- )

== Discography ==
as The Pipes & Drums of British Caledonian Airways

- Alba (1987) – with The BBC Scottish Symphony Orchestra

as ScottishPower Pipe Band

- Tartan Weave (1995)
- Cathcart (2004)
- Live (2015)
- Revolution (2017) – SoundCloud release
