= Jack Lee (piper) =

Canadian musician

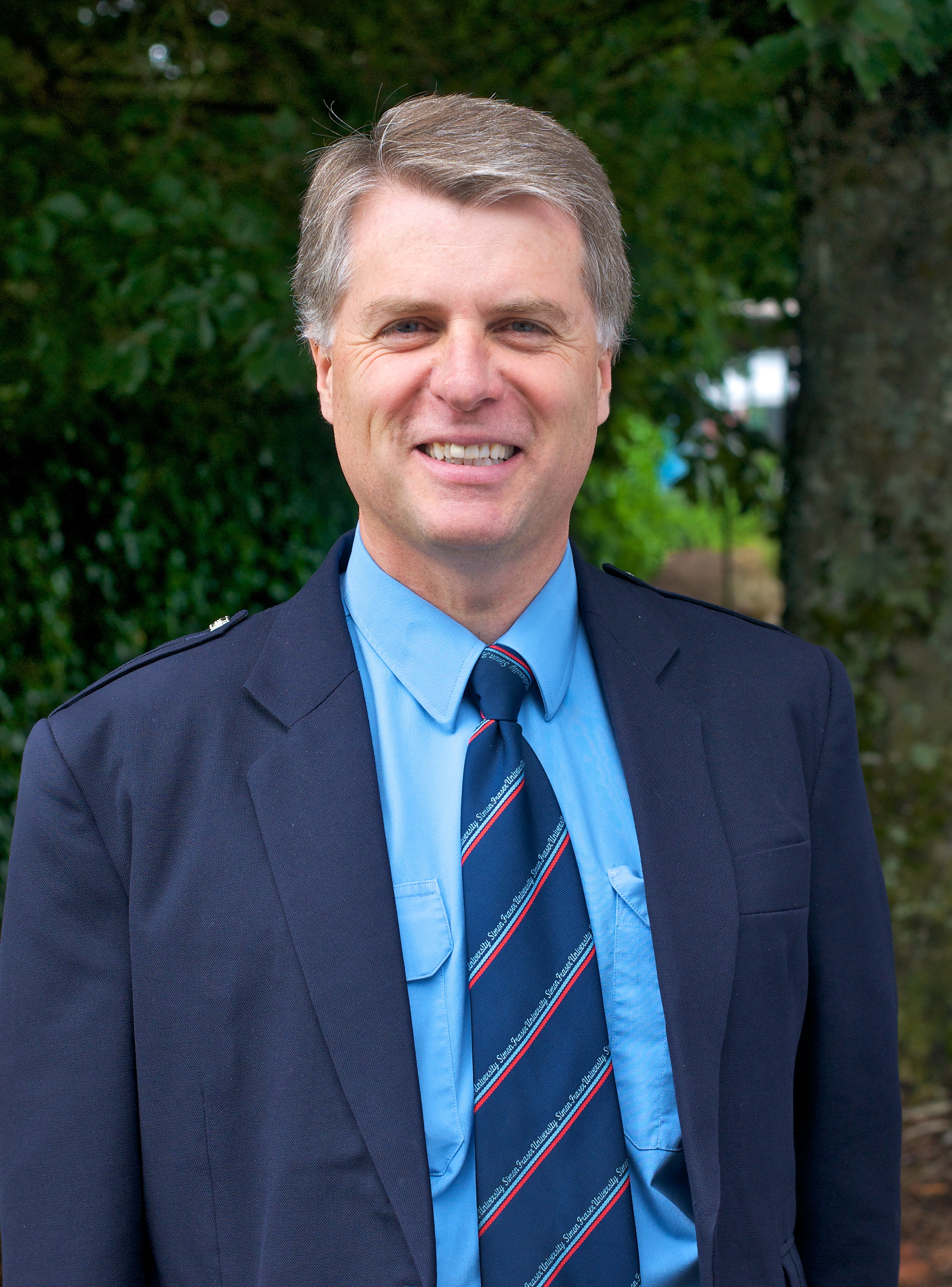

Background information
- Born: 6 December 1957 (age 68); Portage la Prairie, Manitoba

Jack Lee is a Canadian bagpiper and was the pipe sergeant of the Simon Fraser University Pipe Band since its inception in 1981. The band has won the World Pipe Band Championships six times.

== Solo career ==
Lee is a successful solo competitor, having won a significant number of major prizes, including both Highland Society of London Gold Medals (Argyllshire Gathering in 2001 and Northern Meeting in 1981,) the former winner's Clasp at the Northern Meeting (1994), the Canadian Gold Medal (2002), and was the first North American piper to win the Glenfiddich Solo Piping Championship (2003).

== Early life and family ==
He was born on 6 December 1957 in Portage la Prairie, Manitoba, and moved to Surrey in British Columbia at the age of 2. Lee holds a Bachelor of Commerce degree in accounting from the University of British Columbia.

He and his brother Terry, the former pipe major of the Simon Fraser University Pipe Band, received the Meritorious Service Medal by the Governor General of Canada in 1999 at a ceremony in Quebec City, Quebec. They were awarded honorary doctorates by Simon Fraser University in 2013.

He and his wife Christine have three sons, Andrew, Colin, and John, who also ar pipers at Simon Fraser University.
