= Boghall and Bathgate Caledonia Pipe Band =

Scottish pipe band

Peoples Ford Boghall and Bathgate Caledonia Pipe Band
- Established: 1972
- Location: West Lothian, Scotland
- Grade: 1
- Pipe major: Calum Watson
- Drum sergeant: Kerr McQuillan
- Tartan: Ancient Hunting Fraser
- Notable honours: World Champions: 2023 Cowal Highland Gathering Champions: 1994, 2000, 2010 & 2012 UK Champions*: 2023 Scottish Champions: 1986, 1987 British Champions: 1983, 1986 & 2024 European Champions: 1989, 2003 & 2012 World Pipe Band Championship Runner-Up: 1982, 1983, 1994 & 2013 World Drum Corps Champions: 1981, 1982, 1983, 1986, 2001, 2012: UK Championship replaced Cowal Championship in 2014
- Website: www.theboghall.com

The Peoples Ford Boghall and Bathgate Caledonia Pipe Band is a pipe band from West Lothian, Scotland which formed in 1972. The band has competed in Grade 1 since being promoted to that level in 1980.

Throughout its competitive history, the band had not won the World Pipe Band Championships until 2023, though it has been runner up four times and has won the drum corps prize 6 times to date under Tom Brown MBE and his son Gordon Brown.

The band is currently led by Pipe Major Calum Watson and Leading Drummer Kerr McQuillan.

== History ==
In 1972, a few townspeople of Boghall in West Lothian decided that they would try to form a pipe band. An advertisement was put in the local newspaper for young people wanting to learn the pipes or drums, and a group of primarily young players began practising at a Bathgate school. As with many youth bands, numerous adults and committee members from the community were necessary to keep the band running during its early years.

The band rose quickly through the lower grades and a Novice grade band was created in 1977 to handle additional youth who were joining the band. By 1978, the original band had won the Champion of Champions title in Grade Two while the Novice band was upgraded to Juvenile.

The senior band was promoted to Grade 1 in 1980, and throughout the subsequent decade its drum corps won every single major drumming prize. The band as a whole proceeded to win the Scottish, British and European Championships during that decade.

== Band ==
The Pipe Major of the band is Calum Watson, who joined the band from George Watson's College and became pipe major at the end of the 2024 season after many years as Pipe Sergeant to Ross Harvey. The Leading Drummer is Kerr McQuillan.

== Performances ==
The band travelled to Ontario in 2013 for the 50th anniversary of the Cobourg Highland Games, to compete and perform in concert. Individual members of the band have also been successful in solo competitions.

== Results ==
The band has won awards in Grades 1, 2, 3, and 4 as well as at Juvenile and Novice Juvenile levels.

== Pipe Majors ==
- Bobby Allan (1972)
- Kenny Watson (1972)
- Bob Martin (1972–1986)
- Craig Walker (1986–1996)
- Ross Walker (1996–2015)
- Ross Harvey (2015-2024)
- Calum Watson (2024 - present)

== Leading Drummers ==
- Melvin Sim (1972-1974)
- David Steadman (1974-1978)
- Tom Brown (1978–1992)
- Gordon Brown (1992- 2022)
- Kerr McQuillan (2022 - present)

== Discography ==
- Debut Album (1984)
- The Rubik Cube (1989)
- Inspired in Belfast (2001)
- In Concert (2004)
- Forte (2013)
- Cabar Feidh (2024)
