= Lothian & Borders Police Pipe Band =

Scottish pipe band

Lothian and Borders Police Pipe Band
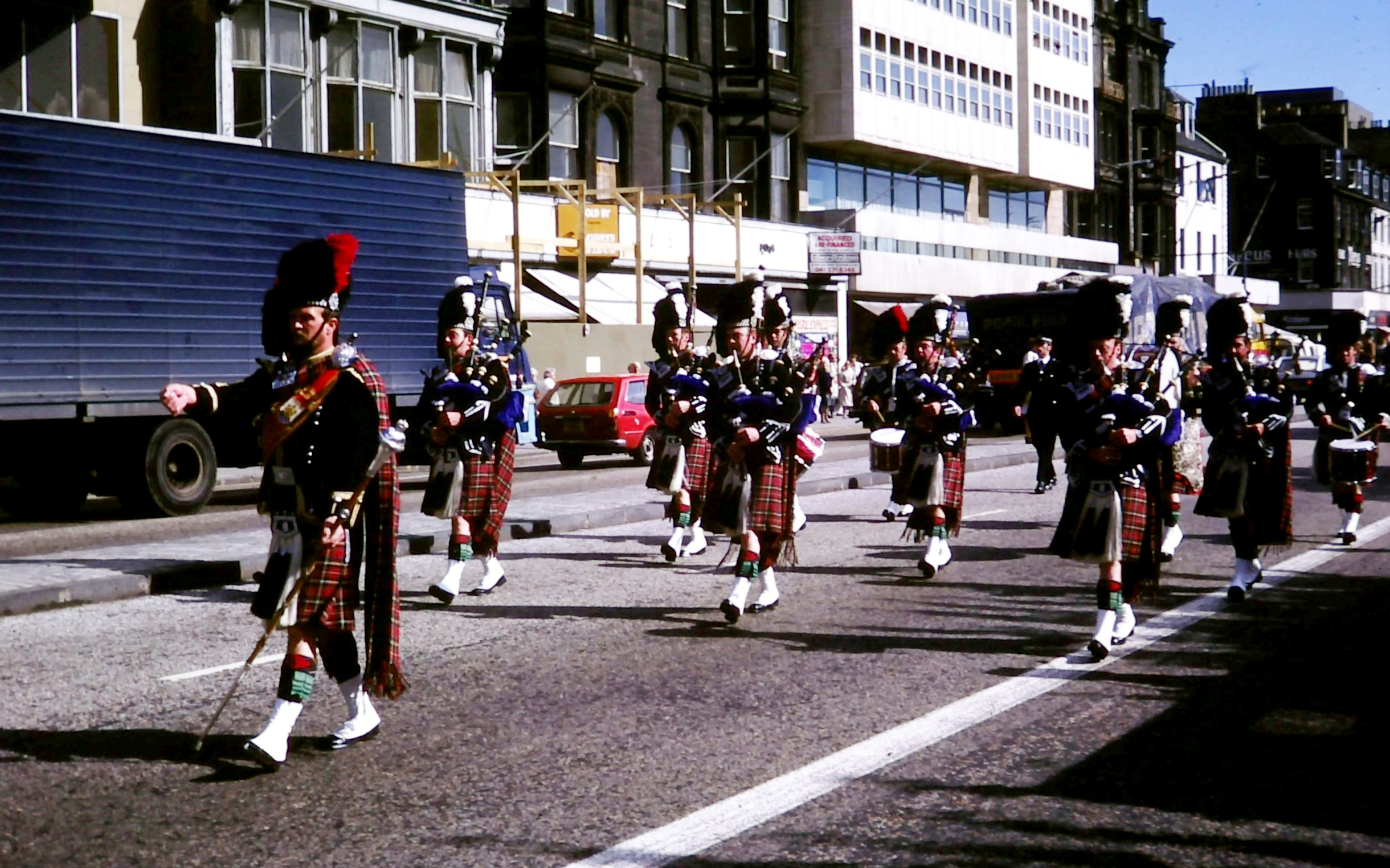
- The band marching along Princes Street in 1980
- Established: 1882
- Disbanded: 2013
- Location: Edinburgh, Scotland
- Grade: 1 (disbanded)
- Tartan: Unknown (1882–1900), Red Ross (1900- 194?), Prince Charles Edward Stewart (194?-2013)
- Notable honours: World Pipe Band Champions: 1919, 1950, 1954, 1963, 1964, 1971, 1972, 1975 World Drum Corps Champions: 1964, 1968

The Lothian and Borders Police Pipe Band was a grade one pipe band based in Edinburgh, Scotland.

== History ==
The band can trace its origins back to 1882, after the Lord Provost's Committee suggested in February of the same year that a police band be formed. The band was not a pipe band at this time, but did however contain pipers.

The earliest known performance by the band was held on 2 June 1883 when the "Edinburgh City Police Pipers" played a number of sets at Waverly Market.

The police band was deemed too expensive for the force to run due to the large number of musicians and became a town band instead. Around 1900, the Edinburgh City Police Pipe Band was formed, led by Pipe Major Norman Graham.

When Graham died in 1910, Pipe Sergeant Hugh Calder took over the leadership of the band. It was under Calder that the band was to win its first major competition. In 1919 the band won the Argyle shield at the Cowal Games, equivalent to the World Pipe Band Championships as they are known today.

After the retiral of Pipe-Major John Burgess, Iain McLeod, already a successful solo piper, took over the mantle of Pipe Major from 1959 until his retiral from the police in 1976. Under his leader-ship, the band was extremely successful competitively and won 5 World Pipe-Band Championship titles in 1963 (Dumfries), 1964 (Ayr), 1971 (Lanark), 1972 (Hawick) and in 1975 (Corby) as the renamed Lothian and Borders Police Pipe-Band. Not only was the band successful competitively during this period, but represented the Police, the city of Edinburgh, Scotland and the U.K. performing at events throughout the UK and Europe, Canada and the USA, Japan, South Africa, Russia and even in Guam. The trip to Russia took place at the height of the Cold War period in 1966, to promote British trade and industry alongside British Prime Minister Harold Wilson.

The music was enjoyed by piping enthusiasts all over the world and the band released 5 albums, as well as making cameo appearances in several Hollywood films including the original Casino Royale, Journey to the Centre of the Earth, Battle of the Sexes and Let's be Happy. During the International Edinburgh Festival, they were a regular feature, marching in a daily parade along Princes Street enjoyed by locals and tourists alike; one of the film sequences featured Vera Ellen as the "Drum Major".

On 30 November 2012, the decision to disband the pipe band was taken, due to a lack of members. It was dissolved on 31 March 2013, to coincide with the formation of a new single police force in Scotland.

== Pipe Majors ==
as Edinburgh City Police Pipers

- Constable A. Findlay (1883–1890)
- Constable Alexander Hamilton (1890–?)

as Edinburgh City Police Pipe Band

- Norman Graham (1900–1910)
- Hugh Calder (1910–1920)
- Alexander Henderson (1920–1923)
- Alexander Henry (1923–?)
- William Sunderland (?–1930)
- Hance T. Gates (1930–1941)
- Duncan R. Cameron (1941–1949)
- Donald Shaw Ramsay BEM (1949–1957)
- John D. Burgess MBE (1957–1958)
- Iain McLeod (1959–1975)

as Lothian & Borders Police Pipe Band

- Iain McLeod (1975–1976)
- Harry McNulty (1976–1982)
- Colin Forbes (1982–1984)
- George Lumsden (1984–1988)
- Duncan Smith (1988–?)
- Constable Les Watson
- Constable Kenny McBride (?–1999)
- Colin MacLellan (1999–2004)
- Keith Dawes (2004–2006)
- David Barnes (2007–2009)
- Ian Duncan (2009–2011)
- Neil Hall (2011–2012)
- Constable John Fraser (2013)

== Leading Drummers ==
as Edinburgh City Police Pipe Band

- Alex McGregor
- James Catherwood (1941–1951)
- George (Geordie) Pryde (1951–1957)
- Robert (Bob) Montgomery (1958–1969)
- Alex Duthart (1969–1970)
- Robert (Bob) Montgomery (1970–1974)

as Lothian & Borders Police Pipe Band

- Ian Watt (1975)
- Michael Dow (1976–1977)
- Robert (Bob) Montgomery (1977–1985)
- Bryn Butler (1985–1987)
- Alan Kenny (1987–1988)
- Arthur Cook (1988–1995)
- Constable Stewart Gardiner (1995–1999)
- Arthur Cook (1999–2011)
- Jake Jørgensen (2011–2013)

== Discography ==
as Edinburgh City Police Pipe Band

- Princes Street Parade (1956)
- Pipes and Drums of the Edinburgh City Police Pipe Band (1957)
- The Pipes and Drums of Scotland, No. 2 (1959)
- March of The Pipers (1962)
- The Edinburgh City Police Pipe-Band (1965)
- The Piper's Parade (1967)
- Champions of The World (1971)
- Capital Parade (1975)
- Pride of Princes Street (2012)
- Here Come the Champions: Great Marches and Reels (2014)
- Edinburgh City Police Pipe-Band Revisited - Pipe Major Iain McLeod's Selection (2016)

as Lothian & Borders Police Pipe Band

- The Piper's Salute (1979)
- Centennial (1990)
