= Bratach Gorm =

Award given by the Scottish Piping Society of London

The Bratach Gorm (or Blue Banner) is the highest prize given by the Scottish Piping Society of London and was introduced in 1938.

== History ==
In 1994 the competition pool was further reduced in protest at the selection of judges.

The competition has been held in a number of locations in central London, most recently at the Caledonian Club in 2019.

== Competition ==
It can only be won by those who have won the; Highland Society of London Gold Medal at the Argyllshire Gathering or Northern Meeting or the first prize at the William Gillies Memorial Cup. The monetary value as a primary Pibroch is £500. In order to win the annual London Piping Championship an entrant must have won this and another award.
