= National Piping Centre =

Centre and museum for the study of bagpipes in Glasgow, Scotland

The National Piping Centre
- Motto: Enriching Lives Through Piping
- Founders: Sir Brian Ivory, Lady Ivory and Sandy Grant Gordon CBE
- Established: 1996
- Focus: To promote the study of the music and history of the Highland Bagpipe.
- Staff: Director: Finlay MacDonald . Head of Piping Studies: John Mulhearn
- Key people: Patron: King Charles III
- Location: 30-34 McPhater St, Glasgow, Scotland, G4 0HW
- Coordinates: 55°52′02″N 4°15′24″W
- Interactive map of The National Piping Centre
- Museum of Piping
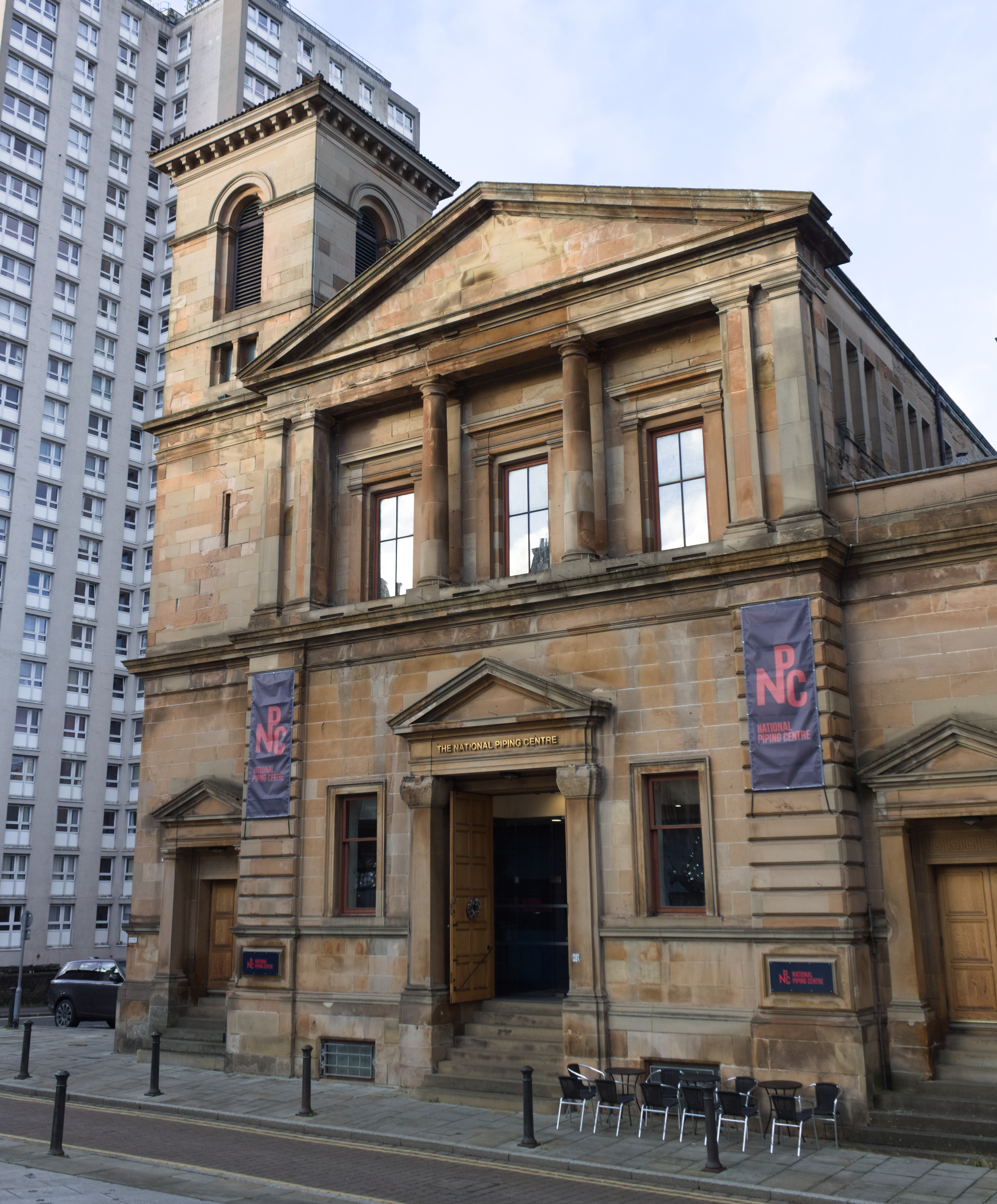
- Entrance to the National Piping Centre and Museum of Piping on McPhater St

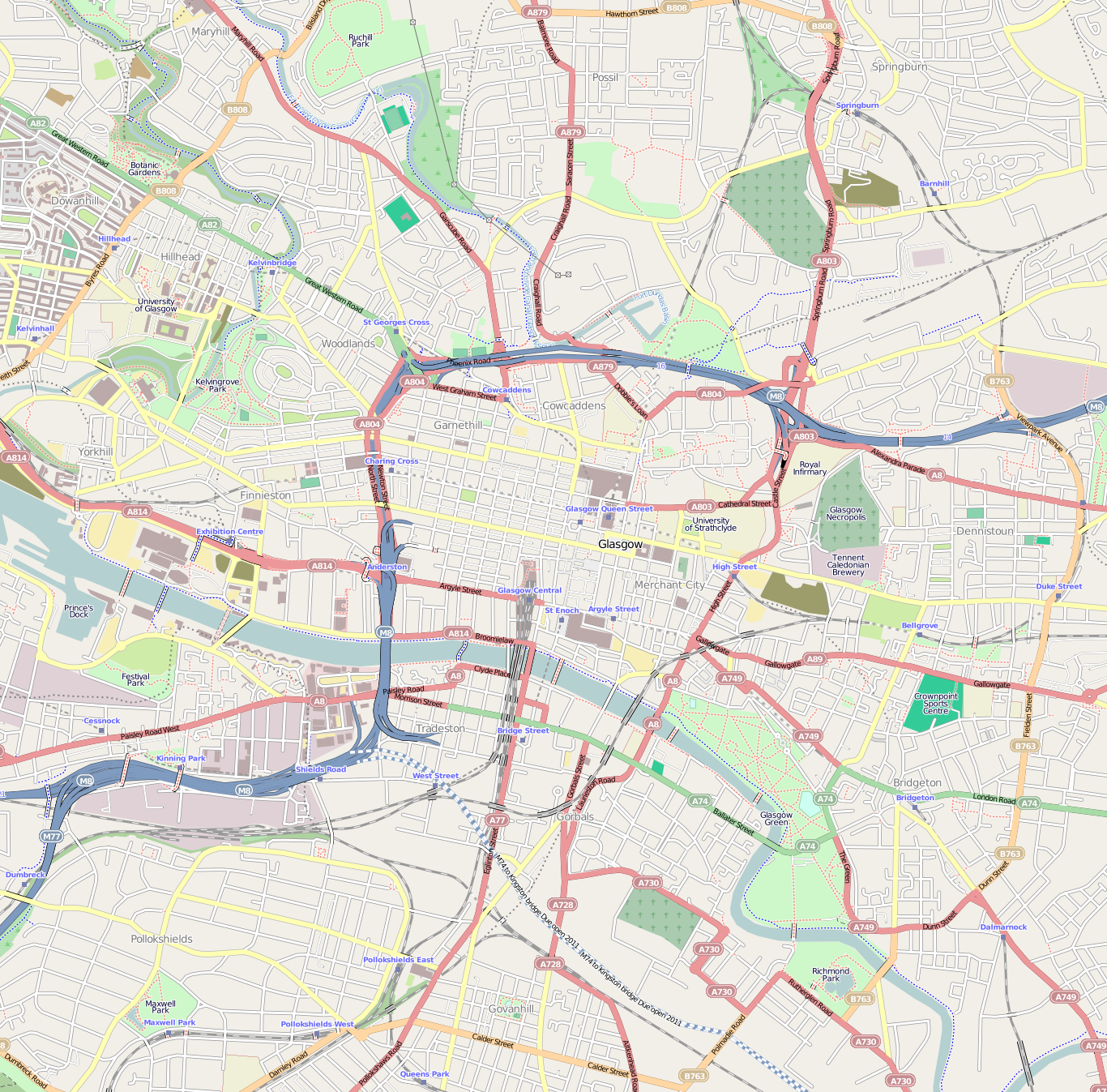
- Location within Central Glasgow
- Type: Music museum
- Key holdings: Iain Dall Mackay Chanter
- Public transit access: Cowcaddens
- Website: www.thepipingcentre.co.uk

Listed Building – Category B
- Official name: 30-34 McPhater Street and 3 and 5 Larbert Street, The Piping Centre, Cowcaddens Former Free Church and Hall
- Designated: 15 December 1970
- Reference no.: LB32755

The National Piping Centre is an institution in Glasgow, Scotland, dedicated to the playing of the bagpipes, to include not only the Great Highland Bagpipes, but also the Scottish smallpipes and Irish uileann pipes, as well as other traditional musical instruments.

The institution includes practice spaces, an auditorium, and the Museum of Piping.

In 2018, the National Piping Centre formally merged with the College of Piping, another historic Glasgow-based piping institution, to become the National Piping Centre incorporating the College of Piping, further consolidating its role as a central hub for piping education and heritage in Scotland.

It is located in the Cowcaddens district of the city, in the former Cowcaddens Free Church. The building is Category B listed. Following the merger with the College of Piping, it obtained the College's building on Otago Street, in Glasgow's West End.

== The Museum of Piping ==
The Museum of Piping displays a rich collection of bagpipes and related artifacts, tracing 300 years of piping heritage. It features Scottish bagpipes from the 18th century, European bagpipes, and items related to famous pipers like John MacColl and Robert Reid. The museum also highlights the competitive tradition of Highland bagpipes.

== See also ==
- List of music museums
