= Royal Scottish Pipe Band Association =

The Royal Scottish Pipe Band Association
- Motto: Ceol na h-Alba
- Established: 1930
- President: Position Vacant
- Chair: Robert Niven
- Patron: His Majesty King Charles III
- Key people: Chief Executive: Colin Mulhern
- Address: 45 Washington Street, Glasgow G3 8AZ
- Website: https://rspba.org/

The Royal Scottish Pipe Band Association (RSPBA) is an association aiming to oversee pipe band competition, and to promote and encourage the development of pipe band culture worldwide. It was founded in 1930.

== Overview ==
The RSPBA sets the rules and guidelines for pipe band contests in the United Kingdom, administers the events including coordinating adjudication, logistics, and evaluation, and holds Annual General Meetings to ensure that the rules and regulations are up to date.

The RSPBA also administers and coordinates the World Pipe Band Championships, held every August in Glasgow. In addition to "The World's", there are four other Major Contests - Scottish, British, European, and UK Championships. At Branch level, there are numerous contests held at Highland Games and any venue which raises the fund to hold a contest. Bands are placed in a Grade system - from Grade Novice Juvenile B up to Grade 1. Competitive standards are set and maintained by the Music Board, and each branch of the RSPBA may appoint two National Council members to represent their Branch Members at the national level.

== Associated organizations ==
The RSPBA has many branches and affiliate organizations throughout the world. Some of these organizations include:

=== RSPBA BRANCH ===
- London & South of England Branch
- Lothian & Borders Branch
- North East England Branch
- Northern Ireland Branch
- North of Scotland Branch
- Ayrshire Dumfries and Galloway branch

=== Australia ===
- Australian Pipe Band Association
- New South Wales Pipe Band Association

=== Canada ===
- Alberta Society of Pipers & Drummers
- Alliance of North American Pipe Band Associations
- Atlantic Canada Pipe Band Association
- Pipers And Pipe Band Society of Ontario
- Prairie Pipe Band Association of Manitoba
- Saskatchewan Pipe Band Association
- British Columbia Piper's Association

=== Ireland ===
- Irish Pipe Band Association

=== Germany ===
- Bagpipe Association of Germany

=== Netherlands ===
- Netherlands Pipe Band Association

=== New Zealand ===
- Royal New Zealand Pipe Bands' Association

=== Scandinavia ===
- The Pipe Band Association of Scandinavia

=== South Africa ===
- Pipe Band Association of South Africa

=== Switzerland ===
- Pipe Band Association of Switzerland

=== United States ===
- Alliance of North American Pipe Band Associations
- Eastern United States Pipe Band Association
- Midwest Pipe Band Association
- Southern United States Pipe Band Association
