= Pre-Worlds concert =

Pipe band concert series

Pre-Worlds Concert
- Status: Active
- Genre: Pipe Band Concert
- Frequency: Annual
- Venue: Motherwell Civic Centre (former); SEC Armadillo (former); Glasgow Royal Concert Hall - current
- Locations: Glasgow, Scotland
- Country: United Kingdom
- Years active: 1994–present
- Founder: Glasgow Skye Association Pipe Band
- Most recent: 2025, Shotts and Dykehead Caledonia Pipe Band: Solas

The Pre-Worlds Concert is an annual pipe band concert organised by the Glasgow Skye Association Pipe Band, first held in 1994.

The concert takes place just before the prestigious World Pipe Band Championships, the concert is designed to showcase performances by the world's top pipe bands. Drawing both local and international audiences, the event has grown into a highly anticipated feature of the pipe band calendar. Over the years, the concert has highlighted a diverse array of piping talent, offering an opportunity for bands to present unique and innovative performances outside of the competitive arena.

== History ==
The Pre-Worlds Concert was conceived by the Glasgow Skye Association Pipe Band as a way to spotlight the artistry and musical creativity of leading Grade 1 pipe bands. The event was originally hosted in the Motherwell Civic Centre but is now hosted at the Glasgow Royal Concert Hall, with the exception of 2023 when it was closed for refurbishment, and occurs in the week leading up to the World Pipe Band Championships, which are regarded as the pinnacle of competitive pipe band performance.

Unlike the highly structured and competitive nature of the World Championships, the Pre-Worlds Concert allows bands to showcase more experimental and diverse repertoires. This includes original compositions, collaborations with other musicians, and innovative arrangements giving performers a chance to explore different musical styles while retaining the traditional essence of Scottish traditional music.

Over the years, many of the world's top-ranked pipe bands have been invited to perform, making the concert a prestigious event. The concert draws both local piping enthusiasts and international visitors, with tickets often selling out well in advance.

In 2023, the concert was moved to the SEC Armadillo due to refurbishments at the Glasgow Royal Concert Hall but returned in 2024.

== Format ==
With the exception of the Millennium Concert, each year, a single pipe band is invited to headline the concert. The chosen band often uses the opportunity to present music that highlights their strengths, with a special emphasis on innovation, musicality, and showmanship. The concert typically runs for about two hours, with the headlining band performing a series of sets that vary in style and mood. Many bands also use the event as a platform to release live albums, allowing the music performed at the concert to reach a wider audience.

== List of concerts ==
List of Pre-Worlds Concerts
Year	Band	Concert Name/Theme
1994	78th Fraser Highlanders	Live in Scotland
1995	Vale of Atholl	Live 'n' Well
1996	Field Marshal Montgomery	FM Live in Concert
1997	Simon Fraser University	
1998	Victoria Police	Masterblasters
1999	78th Fraser Highlanders	
2000	Shotts & Dykehead, Field Marshal Montgomery, 78th Fraser Highlanders, Vale of Atholl	A Pipe Band Spectacular
2001	Shotts and Dykehead Caledonia	
2002	Field Marshal Montgomery	Unplugged
2003	78th Fraser Highlanders	
2004	Boghall and Bathgate Caledonia	
2005	St Laurence O'Toole	
2006	Vale of Atholl	
2007	Field Marshal Montgomery	RE:CHARGED
2008	Shotts and Dykehead Caledonia	
2009	Simon Fraser University	Affirmation
2010	St Laurence O'Toole	Evolution
2011	ScottishPower	Energy
2012	Boghall and Bathgate Caledonia	Forte
2013	Inveraray & District	Ascension
2014	Greater Glasgow Police Scotland	Ceolry
2015	Simon Fraser University	Nous Sommes Prêts
2016	Field Marshal Montgomery	Impact
2017	Shotts and Dykehead Caledonia	Rise
2018	St Laurence O'Toole	Turas Ceoil - Resume
2019	ScottishPower	SP+R
2020	Event Cancelled (COVID-19 Pandemic)	/
2021	Event Cancelled (COVID-19 Pandemic)	/
2022	Inveraray & District	A Night in That Land
2023	Simon Fraser University	Generations
2024	Boghall and Bathgate Caledonia	Cabar Feidh
2025	Shotts and Dykehead Caledonia	Solas
2026	78th Fraser Highlanders	True North Strong

== Legacy ==
The Pre-Worlds Concert has been instrumental in promoting and preserving the cultural tradition of pipe band music while encouraging creative growth within the genre. The concert has inspired several other events and continues to be a significant moment for the piping community, providing a high-profile stage for the world's best bands.

Many of the performances from the Pre-Worlds Concert have been recorded and released as live albums, further contributing to the global reach of the event. For many pipe bands, performing at the concert is seen as a high honour, a recognition of their excellence within the global piping scene.
