= Muirhead & Sons Pipe Band =

Scottish pipe band

Muirhead and Sons Pipe Band
- Established: 1928
- Disbanded: 1978
- Location: Grangemouth
- Grade: 1 (former)
- Tartan: Princess Elizabeth
- Notable honours: World Champions: 1955, 1956, 1961, 1965, 1966, 1967, 1968, 1969

Muirhead and Sons Pipe Band was a pipe band based in Grangemouth, Scotland. The band was highly successful, winning the World Pipe Band Championships a total of eight times. This total has been surpassed only by Strathclyde Police, Shotts and Dykehead, and Field Marshal Montgomery pipe bands who held the title twenty-one, fifteen, and thirteen times respectively, and equalled by the Clan MacRae Society Pipe Band which also won eight times.

== History ==
The band was named after, and affiliated with, the company Muirhead & Sons, a sawmill based in Grangemouth and founded by George A. Muirhead in the 1880s. Muirhead & Sons Pipe Band was founded in 1928, and started competing in 1932. After a hiatus during World War II, the band reformed in 1946. It won all the Major Championships in Grade 2 in 1948, and was therefore promoted to Grade 1.

The pipe band won the World Championships in 1955, 1956 and 1961 under the leadership of Pipe Major Jackie Smith. Under Robert G. Hardie the band won the World Championships in 1965, 1966, 1967, 1968 and 1969. This run of five consecutive wins (still an unbeaten record for a civilian band) was a record until the Strathclyde Police Pipe Band won six times in a row between 1981 and 1986, a record that still stands.

Jim Hutton was leading drummer when the band won the World Championships in 1961. David Hutton was a member of the band along with Andrew Dowie for all eight of the band's World Championship victories.

The band was disbanded in 1978, the year of its 50th anniversary. The City of Victoria Pipe Band in British Columbia was founded by James Troy on the model of Muirhead and Sons and Shotts and Dykehead Caledonia.

== Pipe Majors ==
- James Wilson (1928–1952)
- John (Jackie) Smith (1952–1962)
- Robert Hardie (1962–1978)

== Discography ==
The band made several recordings, and has also appeared in later compilation albums.

- World Champion Pipe Band (1956)
- Champion of Champions (1967)
- Scotland the Brave (1969)
- Sound of the Champions (1971)
- Champions du Monde (1974)
