= Sri Dasmesh Pipe Band =

Pipe Band

- ਸ੍ਰੀ ਦਸਮੇਸ਼ ਪਾਈਪ ਬੈਂਡ
- Named after: 10th Guru
- Founded: 1986
- Founder: Sukdev Singh; Harvinder Singh
- Founded at: Kuala Lumpur
- Type: Non-governmental organization
- Tax ID no.: None
- Headquarters: Kuala Lumpur
- Location: Kuala Lumpur
- Region served: Malaysia
- Chairman: Sukdev Singh
- Subsidiaries: None
- Volunteers: 40
- Website: https://sridasmesh.org/

The Sri Dasmesh Pipe Band (Punjabi: ਸ੍ਰੀ ਦਸਮੇਸ਼ ਪਾਈਪ ਬੈਂਡ) is a Malaysian Sikh pipe band.

== History ==
The band was formed in 1986 by Sukdev Singh, a commercial pilot and his brother, Harvinder Singh and was named after the 10th Guru of the Sikhs.

== Sri Dasmesh Pipe Band's work ==
They have played in various countries including in Australia to mark the centenary celebrations of world war 1 in 2009 and 2015 and also in Scotland in 2015 to pay tribute to Maharaja Duleep Singh - the last Maharaja of the Sikhs.

In 2015 the band made history by becoming the first band from South East Asia to compete in World Pipe Band Championship. In 2016 they won the Kuala Lumpur Highland Games. In 2019 they made history again by becoming the first group from South East Asia to win the World Pipe Band Championship. They received a hero’s welcome upon their return to Malaysia.

In 2026 the band played at Malaysia’s first bagpipe concert at Dewan Filharmonik Petronas and they secured seventh place in the World Pipe Band Championships.
