= City of Whitehorse Pipe Band =

Australian competition pipe band

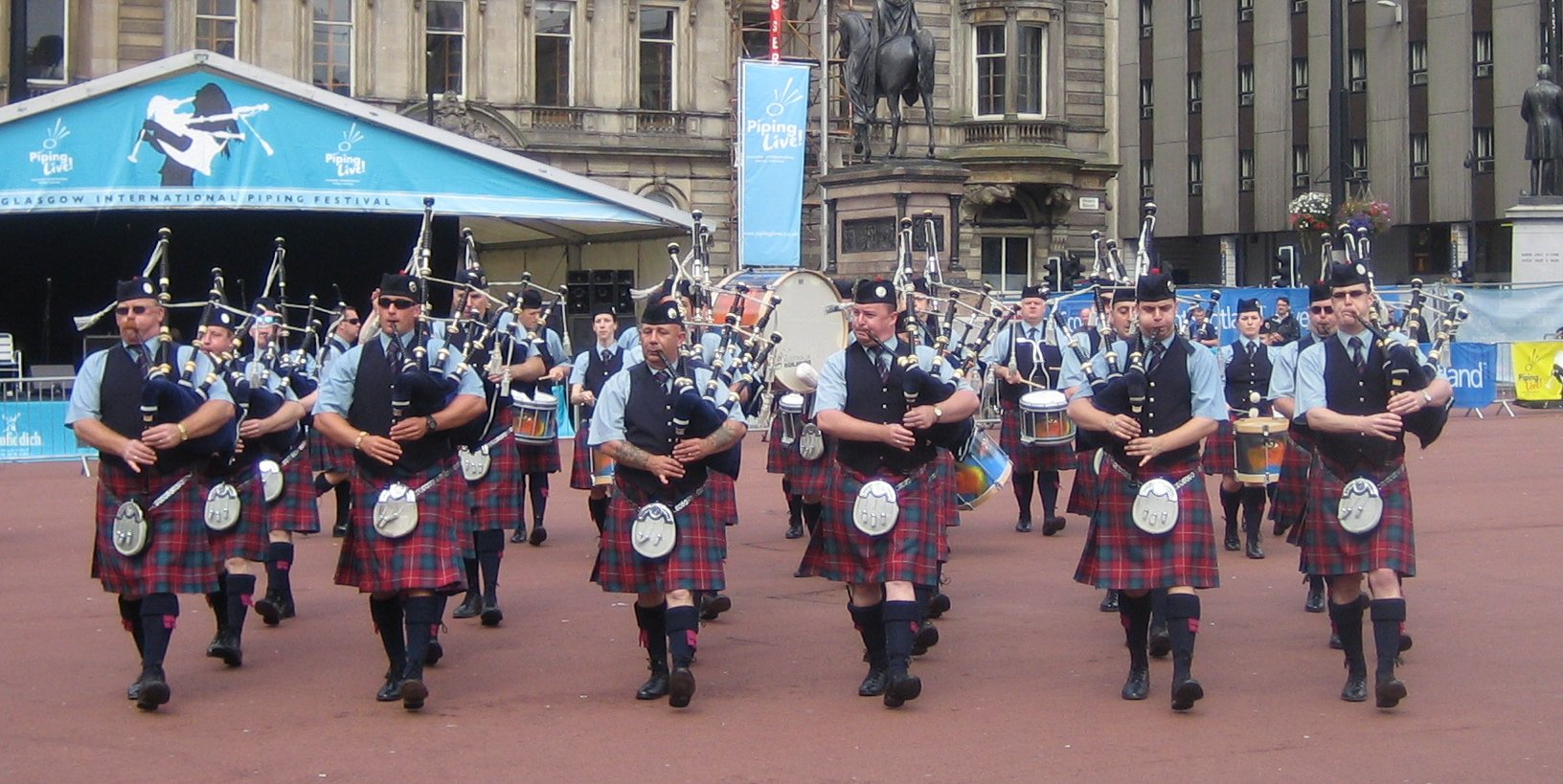
- Established: 1956
- Location: Melbourne, Australia
- Grade: 1
- Pipe major: George Shepherd
- Drum sergeant: Olav Goud
- Tartan: Custom Tartan
- Notable honours: Winner, Australian and South Pacific Pipe Band Championships: 2006; Finalist - World Pipe Band Championships: 2006, 2007 & 2009

The City of Whitehorse (CoWPB) was a competition pipe band, based in Nunawading, Victoria, Australia. The band's previous incarnations had been successful on the Australian Pipe Band competition circuit for numerous years, and was placed 11th in the final tables of the World Pipe Band Championships in 2006. The band reformed in 2014 and was led by Pipe Major George Shepherd and Drum Sergeant Olav Goud. The band ceased operations in 2016 following the decision of Pipe Bands Australia to suspend five members and later, terminate the band's membership following a protracted period of behaviour deemed unacceptable by the association.

== History ==
The City of Nunawading Pipe Band, as it was first known, was formed in 1956. The first Pipe Major was Bill Sutherland, hence the Sutherland tartan. The first Leading Drummer was Andrew Clark and Corporal Drummer John Hayden. In the late 1970s, and early 1980s, the Pipe Major was Brian Symington, the Drum Major was Robert Counsins (followed by D/M Geoff Bellis), and the leading drummer was Bill Russell. Three decades of local competition saw the band venture to New Zealand in 1989, where they won the national championships in Grade 2. Under a year later, Nunawading also secured first place in Grade 2 of the Australian and South Pacific Pipe Band Championships (held in Brisbane, Queensland) which earned their promotion to Grade 1. After several years competing in this grade, the City of Nunawading Pipe Band took another overseas trip, this time to the World Pipe Band Championships in Glasgow, Scotland. In the home of the Great Highland Bagpipe, the Australian contenders placed 18th. While this was a commendable effort, the band went into decline for much of the remaining decade, until its resurgence in 2001 under the leadership of Danny and Alistair Boyle, pipe major and drum major, respectively. After this changeover, Nunawading climbed from Grade 3 to Grade 1 in the space of a single competition season. To fill the void left by the upgrading, and in order to make space for an influx of new members, a second band was created. Nunawading again travelled to New Zealand in 2003, and placed 2nd in Grade 1. The band subsequently attained 19th placing competing in Grade 1 in the 2005 world pipe band championships held in Glasgow, Scotland.

== Australia Highlanders Era ==
For marketing reasons, in February 2006, the band's name was rebadged as Australia Highlanders Pipe Band. In August 2006, the band returned to Scotland to place 4th at the Bridge of Allan pipe band competition, as well as to again compete at the World Pipe Band Championships wherein the band qualified for the Grade 1 final for the first time, finishing 11th. With an overall win at the Australian and South Pacific Pipe Band Championships later in the year, it was seen that the exceptional performances the band was already known for could still be expected under its new name. The 50th Anniversary of the band remains its most successful year to date.

In 2007 the band returned once more to Glasgow for the World Championships. Again, they qualified for the Grade 1 final and, this time, finished 13th.

== City of Whitehorse Era ==
Following four years of dormancy (from 2010 until 2014), the band relaunched under a new name and personnel. The band was subsequently placed in Grade 2 and won the 2015 Victorian Pipe Band Championships in a field of two bands, the other being City of Hawthorn Pipe Band.

In 2016, five members of CoWPB were suspended by Pipe Bands Australia (PBA) for derogatory remarks towards an international adjudicator on the band's private Facebook page. The five members (including the Pipe Major and Drum Sergeant) subsequently resigned their membership of PBA and the band's leadership then resigned its membership of the PBA, before accepting an offer to renew its membership/registration in order to be eligible to compete at the Australian Pipe Band Championships held on 2–3 October at Knox College, Sydney, without the inclusion of the five suspended personnel. However, at the 2016 Australian Championships, CoWPB was disqualified from the medley contest (having been placed second of a field of two bands in the MSR element) when suspended players were discovered to be assisting the band in the tuning-up area, in contravention of the conditions that had been previously stipulated by the governing body. The band's membership of PBA was subsequently annulled and the band deregistered, with the support of the RSPBA (Royal Scottish Pipe Bands Association).

Despite statements from its membership that the band would continue in some fashion, the band soon collapsed and ceased to exist, with its individual players free to join other bands within the association.

This was not the first time that the band's Pipe Major of the time (and one of the five suspended players), George Shepherd, was the subject of controversy in the pipe band scene, having been suspended by the RSPBA during his tenure with Clan Gregor (also now defunct) in 2006 for behaviour towards a player from a rival band.
