= Richard Parkes (piper) =

Richard Parkes MBE
- Born: January 29, 1960 (age 66)
- Occupation: Engineer
- Instrument: Bagpipes
- Formerly of: Field Marshal Montgomery Pipe Band

Richard Parkes MBE (born 29 January 1960) is a bagpiper from Northern Ireland and former pipe major of Field Marshal Montgomery Pipe Band.

== Life ==
Parkes was born in Belfast on 29 January 1960.

He started playing in Raffrey Pipe Band at the age of 9, and received tuition from Sandy Cummings. After taking a break of a few months, he returned to the band in 1971, by which time Raffrey had merged with Field Marshal Montgomery to become Freymont, in Grade 3. In 1976 it was decided to reform the band as Field Marshal Montgomery owing to the balance of players in Freymont. The band achieved promotion to Grade 2 under the leadership of Ricky Newell, but in the middle of 1981 Newell left after a disagreement and Parkes became pipe major. Field Marshal was promoted to Grade 1 at the end of 1985, won its first World Championship in 1992, and won every Major Championship in 1993.

Parkes suffered a stroke in March 2004, and Alastair Dunn led the band to victory at the European Championships in his absence, before Parkes returned to lead the band to victory at the World Championships in August. He has said that as a result of the stroke he has to concentrate harder on his own playing in order to not make mistakes.

Under Parkes' leadership Field Marshal Montgomery Pipe Band has won 72 Major Championship titles and is the only pipe band in history to have won a Grand Slam (all five Championships in a year) more than once, having done so three times. (1993, 2011 & 2013)

He has a Master of Science degree in Polymer Engineering and works for Bombardier Aerospace. Parkes married his wife Ruth in 2000.

Parkes has been conferred two doctoral degrees honorem causa. On 1 July 2019, Queens University Belfast conferred a Doctor of Literature for services to music. On 4 July 2019, Ulster University conferred a Doctor of Letters for services to pipe band music nationally and internationally.

After 43 years, in September 2024, Richard Parkes retired as Pipe Major of the Field Marshal Montgomery Pipe Band.
