= 78th Fraser Highlanders Pipe Band =

Canadian pipe band

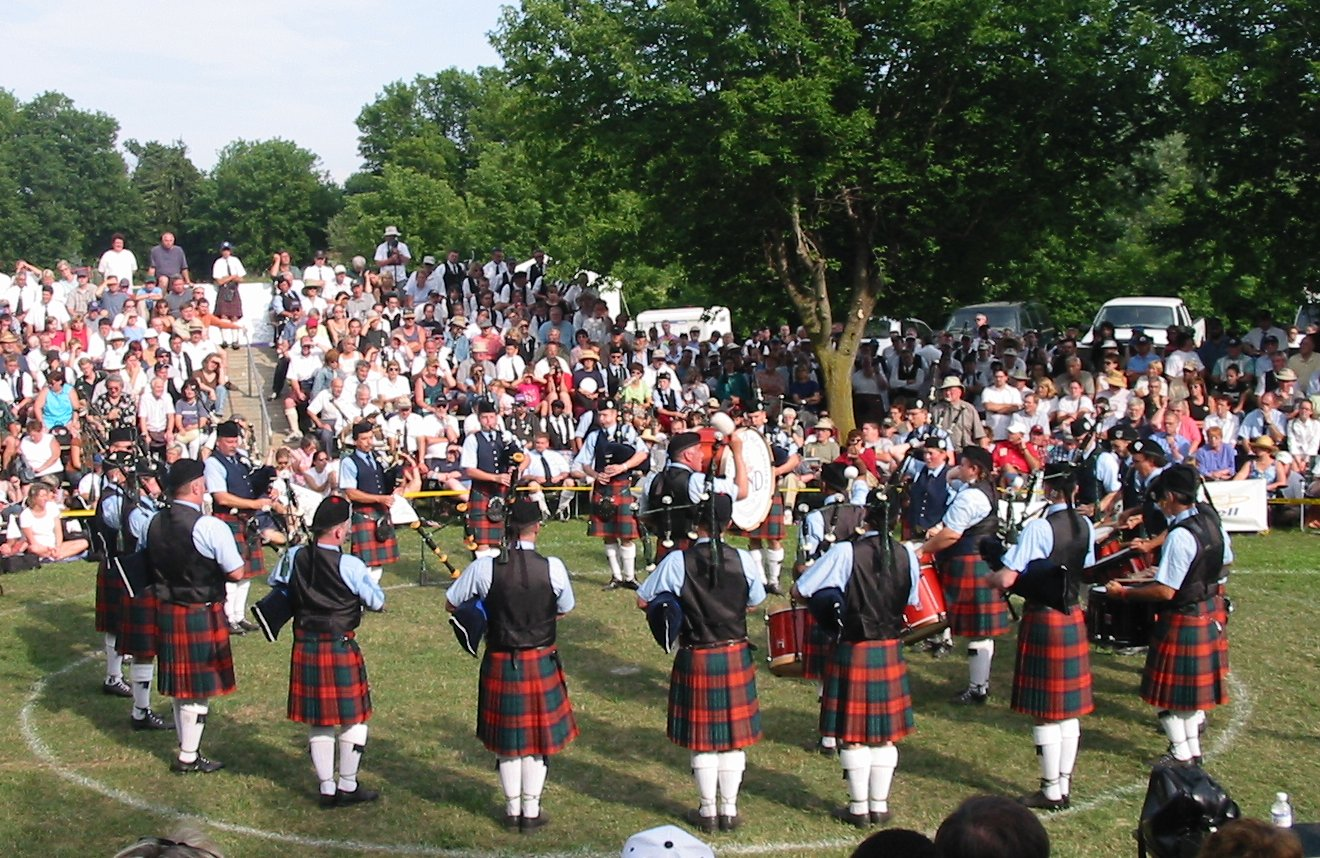
- Established: 1982
- Location: Campbellville, Ontario
- Grade: 1
- Pipe major: Michael Grey
- Drum sergeant: Drew Duthart
- Tartan: 78th Fraser Highlanders
- Notable honours: Winner, World Pipe Band Championships: 1987. Winner, World Drum Corps Champions 1987, 2007, World Bass Section Champions 2007
- Website: www.the78th.online

The 78th Fraser Highlanders Pipe Band, is a grade 1 competitive pipe band from Campbellville, Ontario, Canada.

== History ==
The band was formed in 1982 by members of the disbanded General Motors Pipe Band with support from a 78th Fraser Highlanders re-enactment group, but the band was allowed to keep the name after support from the group ceased.

The 78th Frasers became the first non-Scottish band to win the World Pipe Band Championships, in the summer of 1987, breaking the Strathclyde Police Pipe Band's (now the Greater Glasgow Police Scotland Pipe Band) run of six consecutive wins.

Founding pipe major Bill Livingstone is the only person in history to lead a Grade 1 band to a World Championship and win a Clasp for piobaireachd (Pibroch) at the Northern Meeting, the two pinnacles of competitive success in the piping world. Livingstone stepped down from the role in 2010 after 29 years; he detailed the acrimonious circumstances around his departure in his 2017 memoir Preposterous.

The band has performed four times at the Pre-Worlds concert, at the inaugural 1994 concert, in 1999 and again in 2003, as well as part of the millennium concert.

Livingstone's successor, Doug MacRae, led the band from 2010-2023. Under MacRae’s leadership, the band won several North American Championship titles and continued its unbroken record since 1984 of attendance at the World Pipe Band Championships in Glasgow.

The band is currently led by pipe major Michael Grey and drum sergeant Drew Duthart. The band has won both the North American Pipe Band Championships (held in Maxville, Ontario) and the Canadian Pipe Band Championships (held in Cambridge, Ontario) a total of twelve times each. 'The Frasers' travel to Scotland each summer to compete at the World Championships, and have finished in the prize list eleven times.

The band wears the 78th Fraser Highlanders Pipe Band tartan, which was originally designed for the band in 1998, but was redesigned in 2018.

They have recorded eight albums, all of which have been released by the Glasgow label Lismor Recordings.

== Pipe Majors ==
- Bill Livingstone (1982–2010)
- Doug MacRae (2010–2023)
- Michael Grey (2023–Present)

== Leading Drummers ==
- J Reid Maxwell (1982–1992)
- Harvey Dawson (1992–1996)
- Michael Hunter (1996–2002)
- John Fisher (2002–2004)
- Drew Duthart (2004–Present)

== Discography ==
- 78th Fraser Highlanders (Faces album) (1984)* Up to the Line (1985)
- Live in Concert in Ireland (1987)
- The Immigrant's Suite (1990)
- Live in Canada - The Megantic Outlaw Concert (1992)
- Live in Scotland (1994)
- Flame of Wrath (1998)
- Cascade (2003)
