= Dysart and Dundonald Pipe Band =

Scottish pipe band

- Established: 1929
- Disbanded: 2013
- Location: Fife, Scotland
- Grade: 2 (disbanded)
- Tartan: Ancient Red McPherson
- Notable honours: Winner, World Pipe Band Championships: 1977, 1978
- Website: www.ddpb.net

The Dysart and Dundonald Pipe Band is a currently disbanded pipe band located in Fife, Scotland.

== History ==
The band was founded in 1929 as the Dundonald Juvenile Pipe Band, with Bob Mackay as pipe major. Alex Smart became pipe major in 1935, and after disbanding during the Second World War, the band reformed in 1945 with Hunter Wylie as pipe major. In 1950, Robert MacKay became pipe major and the name of the band was changed to the Dundonald Colliery Pipe Band. With sponsorship from the colliery, the band won the Juvenile Championship at Cowal in 1952. The band went on to win the Grade 3 World Championships in 1953, and after promotion, the Grade 2 World Championships in 1958. After this point the band went into decline, and in 1965 the Dundonald Colliery closed and both the band and the village lost their primary means of support. The Frances Colliery in Dysart adopted the band at this time, resulting in the addition of Dysart to the band's name.

In 1966, Robert Shepherd replaced Robert MacKay as pipe major, and a year later, the band began to train young players, marking the start of the "Youth Policy". A Novice Juvenile band was formed in 1969 and won the World Championships in its grade that year. In 1970, after winning the Champion of Champions in Grade 3, the senior band was promoted to Grade 2, and the juvenile band changed its name to Ballingry High School. The senior band reached Grade 1 in 1973 after winning eight out of ten competitions in Grade 2 and coming second in the others.

The band won the World Pipe Band Championships in 1977 and 1978, in addition they were Cowal Champions four times, British Champions three times, Scottish Champions seven times, and European Champions twice.

In 1983, Bob Shepherd stepped down, and was replaced by his brother George Shepherd. Thereafter, the Grade 1 band was able to keep from being downgraded but won a few events. Although the Juvenile band continued to win major competitions. Tom Brown replaced George Shepherd in 1989, and he was replaced in 1994 by David Barnes, who was in turn replaced by James Murray in 1998. Brian Lamond took over at the end of 1999, and in 2000 the band finished 9th at the World Championships, having failed to qualify in previous years. Between 2002 and 2006, the band placed in several major competitions, and won the Grade 1 competition at the Bridge of Allan Highland Games just before the World Championships.

In 2007, the band was disbanded, but a meeting of former band members in September 2010 saw the band reformed with Greig Canning as pipe major. In May 2012, the band signed a sponsorship agreement with Kilts and More, resulting in a change of name to Kilts & More Dysart & Dundonald Pipe Band.

Andrew Downie succeeded Greig Canning in 2013, but the band was downgraded to Grade 2 after the 2013 season, and disbanded at the end of that year.

== Pipe Majors ==
- Bob MacKay (1929-1935)
- Alex Smart (1935-1945)
- Hunter Wylie (1945-1950)
- Robert MacKay (1950-1966)
- Bob Shepherd (1966-1983)
- George Shepherd (1983-1989)
- Tom Brown (1989-1994)
- David Barnes (1994-1999)
- Brian Lamond (1999-2007)
- Greig Canning (2010-2013)
- Andrew Downie (2013- )

== Discography ==
- Supreme Champions (1975)
- The Skirl o' the Pipes (1976)
- World Champions (1979)
- In Concert – Ballymena (1983)
- Dysart & Dundonald Pipe Band – Pipe Bands of Distinction (1989)
- The Pipe Major's Choice (1999)
- Terra Incognita (2006)
