= Glasgow Police Pipe Band =

Scottish pipe band

Police Scotland & Federation Pipe Band
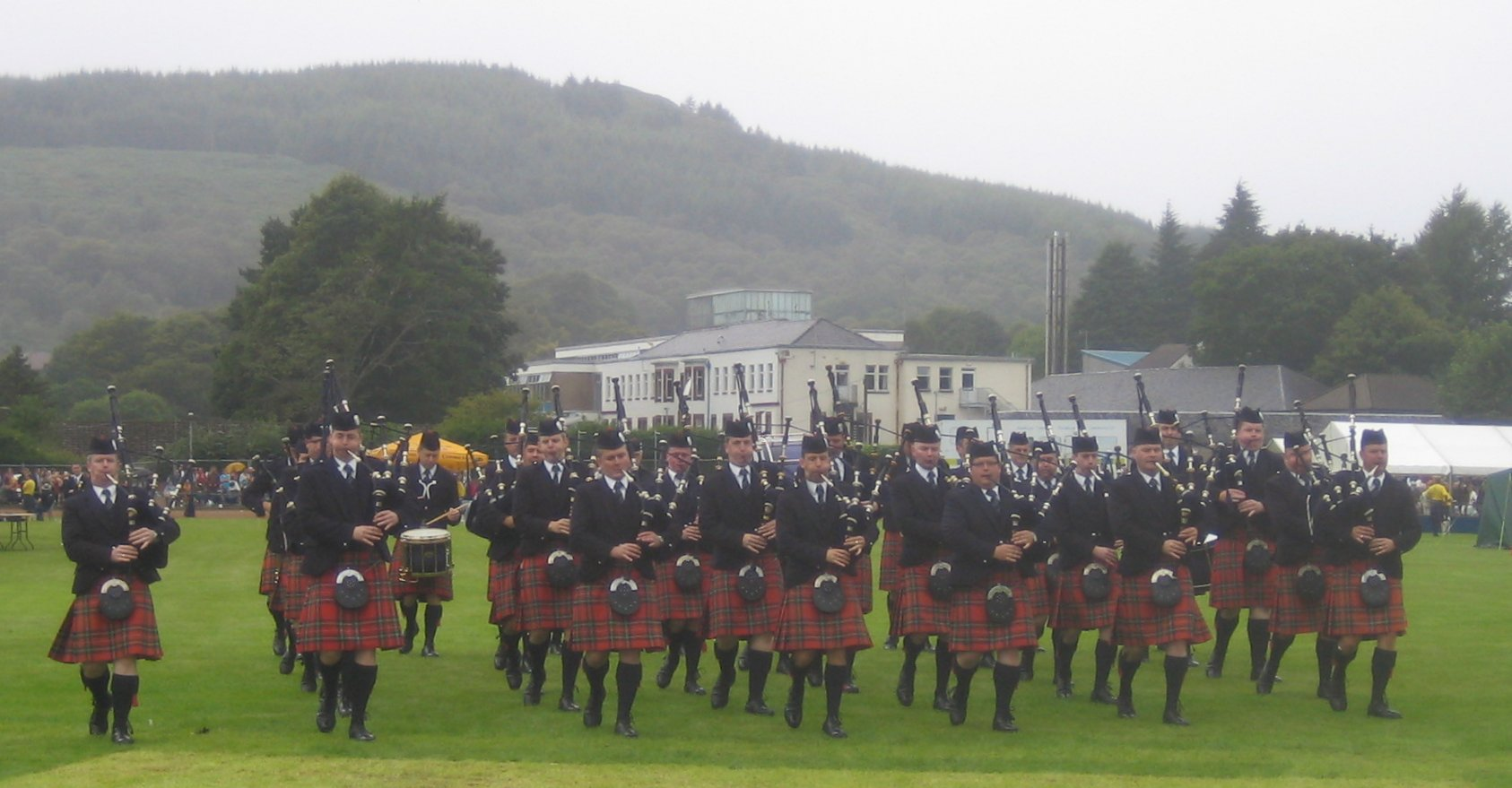
- The band at the Cowal Highland Gathering in 2007
- Established: 1883
- Location: Glasgow
- Grade: 1
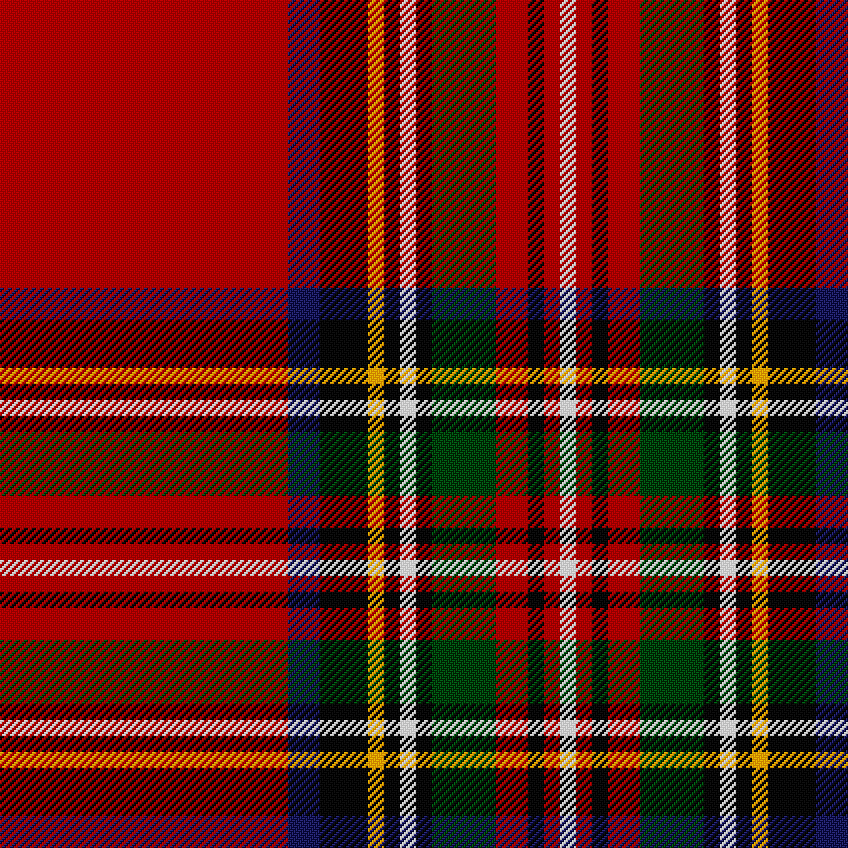
- Tartan: Royal Stewart
- Notable honours: World Pipe Band Champions: 1920, 1936, 1937, 1938, 1939, 1946, 1949, 1951, 1976, 1979, 1981, 1982, 1983, 1984, 1985, 1986, 1988, 1989, 1990, 1991 World Drum Corps Champions: 1936, 1951, 1952, 1972 RSPBA Champion of Champions: 1967, 1977, 1979, 1981, 1982, 1983, 1984, 1985, 1986, 1987, 1988, 1989, 1990, 1991 British Pipe Band Champions: 1967, 1977, 1979, 1981, 1982, 1983, 1985, 1987, 1988, 1990, 1991, 1996, 2003 Scottish Pipe Band Champions: 1966, 1981, 1985, 1988, 2007 European Pipe Band Champions: 1964, 1977, 1979, 1981, 1983, 1985, 1986, 1987, 1990, 1992, 2006 Cowal Gathering Pipe Band Champions: 1920, 1930, 1936, 1937, 1938, 1939, 1946, 1949, 1951, 1962, 1964, 1967, 1977, 1979, 1982, 1983, 1984, 1985, 1986, 1987, 1988, 1991, 2006

Police Scotland & Federation Pipe Band is a grade one pipe band from Glasgow, Scotland. Founded in 1883 as the Burgh of Govan Police Pipe Band, the band enjoyed its greatest competitive success as the Strathclyde Police Pipe Band.

== History ==
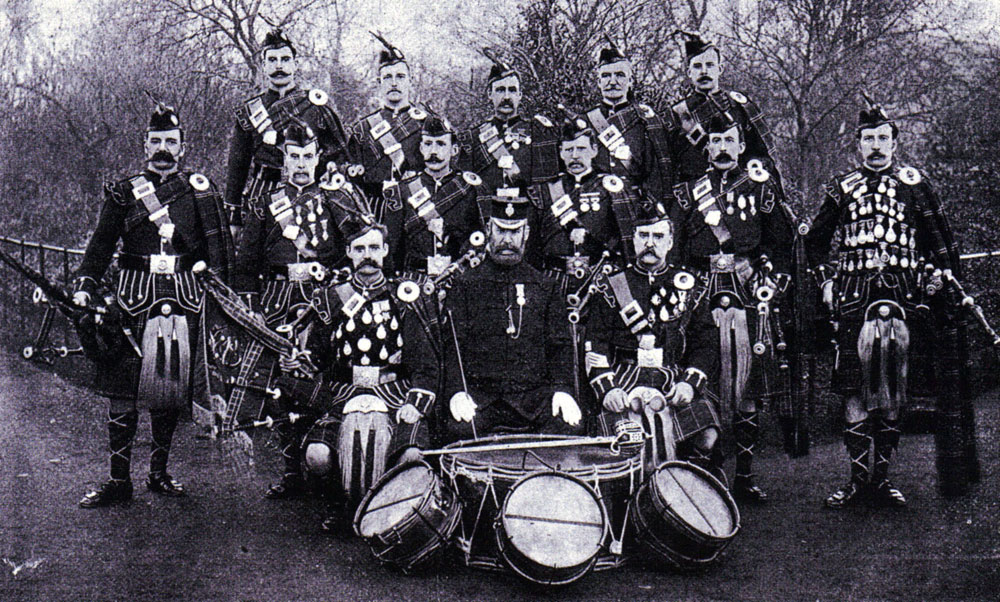
Burgh of Govan Police Pipe Band

The band was one of the first civilian bands in Britain when it formed in 1883 as the Burgh of Govan Police Pipe Band. The first pipe major was William Bremer, who was succeeded by Walter Drysdale in 1890, who was in turn succeeded by Alexander Hutcheon in 1898. The band enjoyed a good reputation, and was recognised nationally for its quality. It wore a tartan designed and hand-spun by the Chief Constable and played two concerts annually to raise funds. . The chief constable's kilt was after the pattern of hodden-grey but with a purple stripe.

Govan was annexed into Glasgow along with Partick in 1912, and the band became the City of Glasgow Police Pipe Band. In 1913 William Gray, a Gold Medal winner, replaced Hutcheon as pipe major, and the tartan was also replaced with the Royal Stewart. The band won its first World Championship in 1920, but due to Gray's focus on events other than competition the next time the band won the Worlds was 1936.

Gray was succeeded in 1932 by John MacDonald, a student of Gray for many years and also a Gold Medal winner, having won at both the Argyllshire Gathering and the Northern Meeting within a week. Under MacDonald, the band won the World Championships in 1936, 1937, 1938 and 1939, and after the Second World War in 1946, 1949 and 1951.

Angus MacDonald succeeded John MacDonald in 1958, and rebuilt the band after the loss of senior players through retirement had reduced the band's competitiveness. Under Angus MacDonald the band won every major championship except the Worlds.

Ronald Lawrie succeeded Angus MacDonald as pipe major in 1967, but due to ill health Lawrie was succeeded by Ian MacLellan in 1972. In 1975, Strathclyde Police was formed by the merger of several police forces to form the second-largest police force in Britain, and the respective bands were merged into the Strathclyde Police Pipe Band under the leadership of Ian MacLellan.

Under MacLellan and leading drummer Alex Connell the band won the World Championships in 1976 and 1979, being placed second to Dysart and Dundonald in 1977 and 1978. Strathclyde Police then won every year from 1981 to 1986, and then four consecutive times from 1988 to 1991. In 1987, the 78th Fraser Highlanders Pipe Band from Canada became the first band based outside Scotland to win the title, and Simon Fraser University, also from Canada, came second, pushing Strathclyde Police into third place. The run of six consecutive wins remains a record, as does the twenty total wins accumulated throughout the band's history.

MacLellan retired in 1992 and was succeeded by Harry McAleer, who led the band until 1996 when he was succeeded by Ian Plunkett. Plunkett was succeeded by James Wark in 2001. Wark retired and was succeeded by Donald Mackay in 2004. Under Mackay, the band enjoyed championship successes once again, winning the European Pipe Band Championships and Cowal Highland Gathering in 2006 and the Scottish Championships in 2007. Mackay stood down in 2008 and was succeeded by Don Bradford.

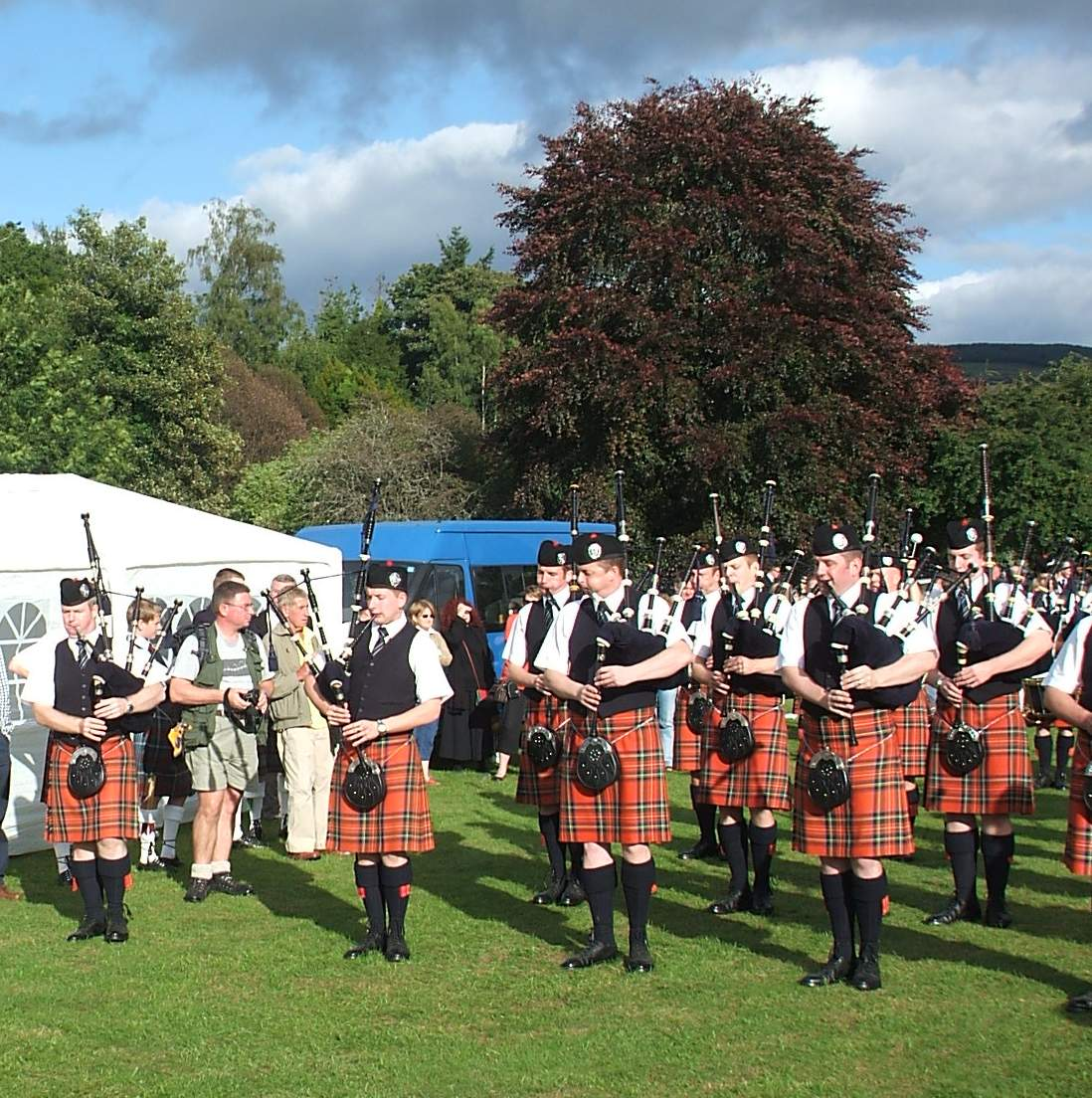
Pitlochry Highland Games 2007, led by Pipe Major Donald Mackay (far left)

In 2009, funding cuts and a restriction on the number of events the band could play at threatened the future of the Strathclyde Police Pipe Band. Bradford and pipe-sergeant Duncan Nicholson resigned in protest, but returned in January 2010 after a new funding agreement was reached.

Duncan Nicholson succeeded Bradford as pipe major in 2010. In 2013, territorial police forces in Scotland were amalgamated to form Police Scotland. The structure of the band was unchanged however the band changed its name to Greater Glasgow Police Scotland Pipe Band. The band performed in the annual Pre-Worlds concert in 2014 with the name Ceolry. Nicholson was replaced as Pipe Major by Iain MacPherson. In the following year, 2016, the band changed name again becoming the Glasgow Police Pipe Band and their leading drummer Eric Ward was replaced by David Henderson.

In December 2019, Iain McPherson stepped down as Pipe Major. Alisdair McLaren briefly served as Pipe Major between December 2019 and January 2020 but resigned to return to his native Australia. Upon McLaren's departure, Duncan Nicholson, former pipe major, was appointed. Later, the band announced Ewan Henderson would be appointed Pipe Major with immediate effect, succeeding Duncan Nicholson, who stepped in as interim Pipe Major.

In 2021, the band announced it would cease competing as the Glasgow Police Pipe Band and begin to be known as Police Scotland & Federation Pipe Band and change from their famous Royal Stewart tartan which the band wore for 108 years.

Over the band's history, it had won a total of 90 major championships, including 20 World Pipe Band Championships, 4 World Drum Corps Championships, 14 RSPBA Champion of Champions titles, 13 British Pipe Band Championships, 5 Scottish Pipe Band Championships, 11 European Pipe Band Championships, and 23 Cowal Highland Gathering Pipe Band Championships, with its most recent championship win in 2007.

== Evolution of Band Name ==
The band faced many name changes throughout its 138 year history due to boundary changes within the Police force.

- Burgh of Govan Police (1883 - 1912) - 29 years
- City of Glasgow Police (1912 - 1975) - 63 years
- Strathclyde Police (1975 - 2013) - 38 years
- Greater Glasgow Police Scotland (2013 - 2015) - 2 years
- Glasgow Police (2015 - 2021) - 6 years
- Police Scotland & Federation (2021 - present)

== Pipe Majors ==
- William Bremer (1883-1890)
- Walter Drysdale (1890-1898)
- Alexander Hutcheon (1898-1913)
- William Gray (1913-1932)
- John MacDonald (1932-1958)
- Angus MacDonald (1958-1966)
- Ronald Lawrie (1966-1972)
- Ian MacLellan BEM (1972-1992)
- Harry McAleer (1992-1997)
- Ian Plunkett (1997-2001)
- James Wark (2001-2004)
- Donald Mackay (2004-2008)
- Don Bradford (2008-2010)
- Duncan Nicholson (2010-2015)
- Iain MacPherson (2015-2019)
- Alisdair McLaren (2019)
- Duncan Nicholson (2020)
- Ewan Henderson (2020–2025)
- Duncan Nicholson (2025-2026)
- James Harper (2026-present)

== Leading Drummers ==
- D/M Walker (1883 - approx. 1910)
- John Seton (approx. 1910-1927)
- Jack Seton (1927-1948)
- Alex McCormick (1948-1952)
- John Walley (1954-1961)
- Alex Connell (1961-1985)
- John Kirkwood Jr. (1985-1992)
- Roddy Darroch (1992-1995)
- Eric Ward (1995-2016)
- David Henderson (2016–2025)
- Blair Faulds (2025-2026)
- Callum Gibbs (2026-present)

== Discography ==
as City of Glasgow Police Pipe Band

- Selection of Strathspeys and Reels/Eightsome Reels - P/M J. MacDonald (Parlophone F.3355)
- 6/8 Marches - P/M J. MacDonald (Parlophone F.3369)
- Marching With The Pipers - P/M A. MacDonald (1966)
- Scottish Pipe Band Music - P/M R. Lawrie (Olympic 6145)
- The Choice of Champions - P/M R. Lawrie (1968)
- Scotland's Best, Vol. 1 - P/M R. Lawrie (1970)
- Scotland's Best, Vol. 3 - P/M R. Lawrie (1971)
- Glasgow Police March Past (1972)

as Strathclyde Police Pipe Band

- World Champions - P/M I. MacLellan (1980)
- Champion of Champions (Champions of the World) - P/M I. MacLellan (1983)
- Six in a Row (1981-1986) - P/M I. MacLellan (1986)
- Solo Pipers, Quartet and Mini Band (1991)
- Pipes, Drums & A Glasgow Girl (2006) - with Joann Gilmartin

as Greater Glasgow Police Scotland Pipe Band

- Ceolry: Live at the Glasgow Royal Concert Hall (2015)
