= St. Laurence O'Toole Pipe Band =

Irish pipe band

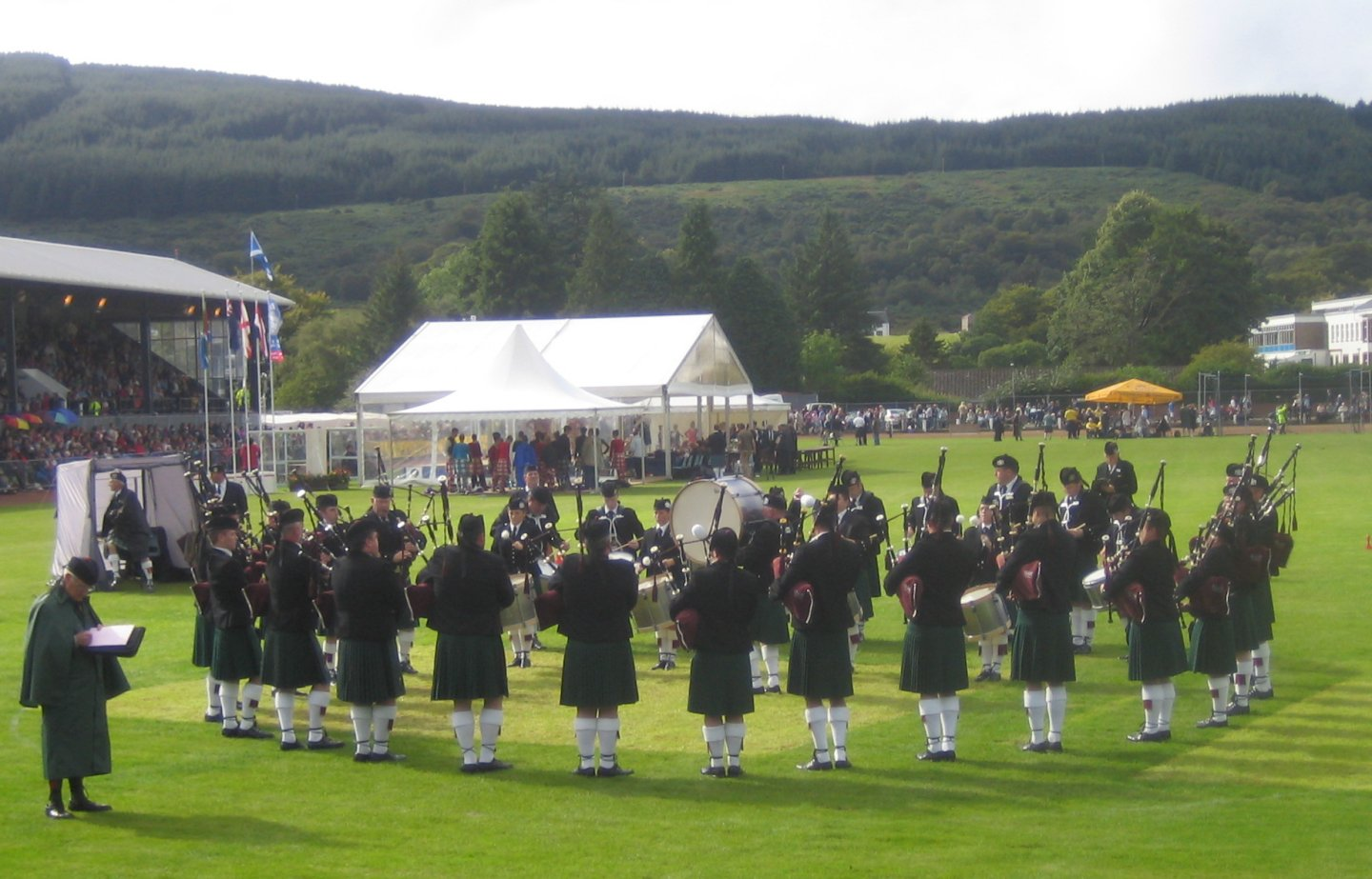
- Established: 1910
- Location: Phoenix Park, Dublin
- Grade: 1
- Pipe major: Alen Tully
- Drum sergeant: Stephen Creighton
- Tartan: Green
- Notable honours: World Pipe Band Champions: 2010 United Kingdom Champions: 2018, 2019, 2024, 2025 Scottish Champions: 2008, 2015, 2018 British Champions: 2008, 2019 European Champions: 2010, 2016 RSPBA Champion of Champions: 2008 All Ireland Champions: 1958, 2007, 2008, 2010, 2014, 2019, 2024, and 2026 Ulster Champions: 1991 & 2007 Drumming Titles World Champions: 2006, 2010, 2015, 2016, 2018, 2019, 2024, and 2026 United Kingdom Champions: 2018, 2019, 2025 Scottish Champions: 2009, 2011, 2015, 2017, 2018, 2025, and 2026 European Champions: 2009, 2010, 2014, 2015 British Champions: 2011, 2014, 2017, 2019 All Ireland Champions: 2002, 2003, 2004, 2006, 2008, 2009, 2010, 2011, 2012, 2014, 2016, 2017, 2018, 2024, and 2026 RSPBA Drumming Champion of Champions: 2014, 2015, 2018
- Website: www.slotpb.com

The St. Laurence O'Toole Pipe Band is a Grade 1 pipe band based in St. Mary's Hospital Campus, Phoenix Park, Dublin, Ireland. The band was established in 1910, and won the World Pipe Band Championships in 2010.

The band's Pipe Major is Alen Tully and Pipe Sergeant is Greig Wilson. The lead drummer is Stephen Creighton.

== History ==
In 1910 a meeting was organised by the St. Laurence O'Toole Gaelic Athletic Association Club in the CBS school, Seville Place, Dublin. The main mover in forming the band was Frank Cahill who was also a founder of the GAA Club and Drama Club. Frank was for many years an Alderman of Dublin Corporation, and later became a member of the new Irish Parliament (Dáil Éireann). Amongst those present at the meeting were Irish republicans Pádraig Pearse, Thomas Clarke, Sean McDermott, Arthur Griffith, Douglas Hyde (later to become the first President of Ireland), and the Irish playwright Seán O'Casey. The band clashed with police at a rally during the Dublin Lock-out of 1913, when leading a group of protesters to Liberty Hall and during the Irish War of Independence the band headquarters were attacked on several occasions by the army. The band ceased any political affiliation after the Irish Civil War, which ended in 1923.

The band won the All Ireland Championships in 1958, and also won two first prizes in Scotland, under the leadership of pipe major John Duggan and drum sergeant Frank Saunders. After a drop in membership, Duggan resigned in 1967 and was not replaced as pipe major, but Tommy Tully was acting pipe major at public engagements, although the band did not compete at this time. During this period the band had been demoted to Grade 3, but won the All Ireland Championships in 1974 and were promoted to Grade 2.

Tommy Tully died in 1984, and his son Terry took over as pipe major, having assumed an increasing role in running of the band in the previous years. In its 75th anniversary in 1985, the band won the Champion of Champions award in Grade 2.

In 1988, the band were again placed second at the Worlds and were subsequently upgraded to Grade 1. In the band's first outing in Grade 1 in 1989, they beat Field Marshal Montgomery into second place.

The band won prizes in Ireland, but not in Scotland in 2002, and in 2004 placed in all five Major championships. In 2008, the band won the Scottish and British Championships, and was runner-up in the European and Cowal Championships and placed 5th overall at the World Championships, winning the Champion of Champions in Grade 1. In 2010, the band's centenary year, the band won the World, European and All-Ireland Championships. Terry's son Alen Tully took over as pipe major for the 2014 season.

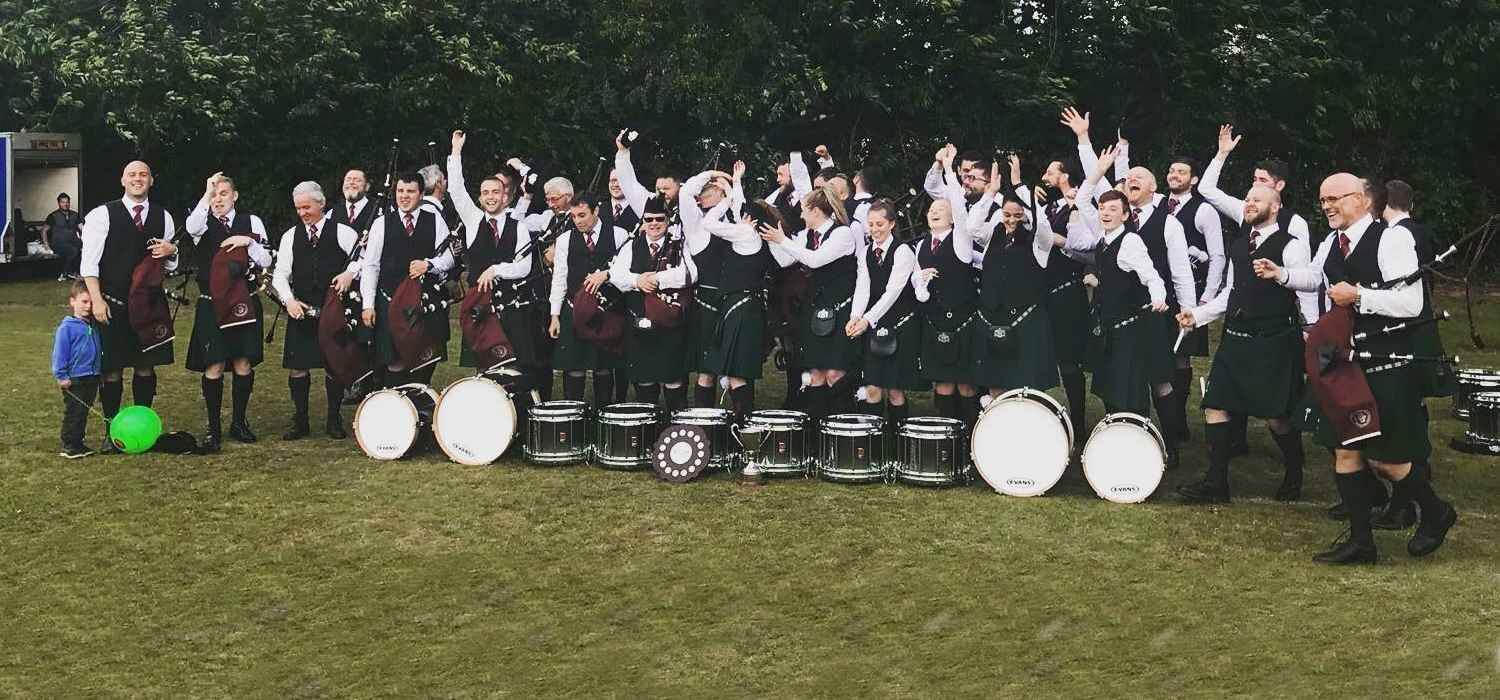
The band celebrating their Grade 1 UK Championship victory in Stormont, Belfast in 2018

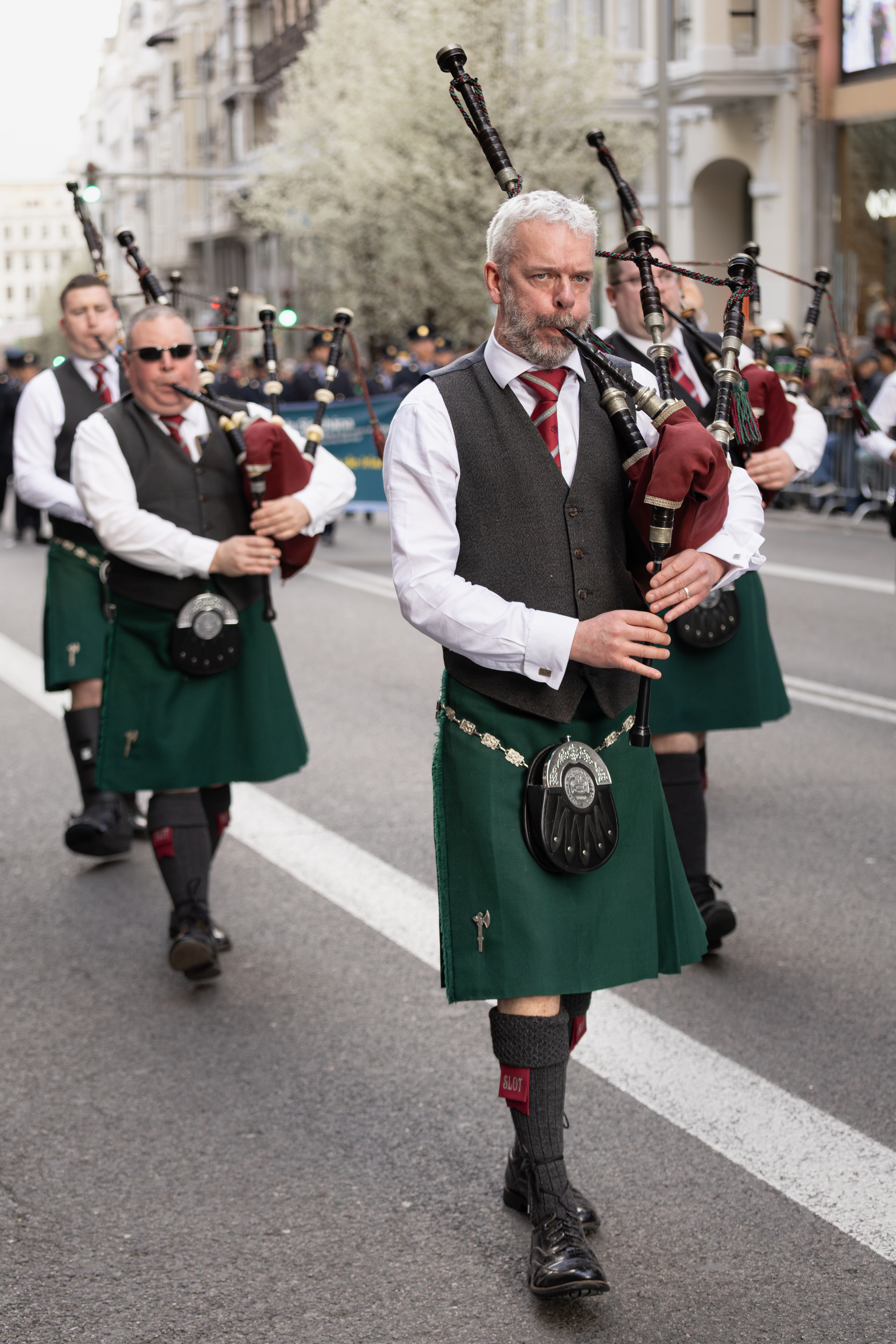
Members of the St. Laurence O’Toole Pipe Band march and perform during the Saint Patrick’s Day Parade on Gran Vía in Madrid, Spain, March 14, 2026.

== Pipe Majors ==
- Michael Colgan (1910-?)
- (incomplete information)
- John Duggan (?-1967)
- Tommy Tully (1967-1984)
- Terry Tully (1984-2013)
- Alen Tully (2013- )

== Leading Drummers ==
- Frank Saunders
- Dominic Casey
- John Keogh
- Dean Hall
- Stephen Creighton

== Discography ==
- The Dawning of the Day (2005)
- Evolution (2010)
- Turas Ceoil : Resume (2018)
