= Clan MacRae Society Pipe Band =

Scottish pipe band

- Established: 1914
- Notable honours: World Champions: 1921, 1922, 1923, 1925, 1932, 1933, 1934, 1953

The Clan MacRae Society Pipe Band was a pipe band based in Glasgow, Scotland, UK. It ran from 1914 to 1972.

== History ==
The civilian City of Glasgow Pipe Band was established by Farquhar MacRae in January 1914, who had previously led the pipe band of the 7th (Blythswood) Battalion Highland Light Infantry, a reserve battalion. The pipe band of the 7th Battalion won the World Pipe Band Championships in 1913, and MacRae resigned along with much of his band after the annual camp of 1913. The first time the City of Glasgow Pipe Band entered the World Championships in 1914 it won second place.

When World War I broke out the band was disbanded, but was reformed under the leadership of William Fergusson in 1920. MacRae died in 1916, and the name of the band was changed to the Clan MacRae Society Pipe Band at some point in the 1920s. At one point under Ferguson's leadership, the band contained six qualified Pipe majors.

William Fergusson led the band to victory at the World Championships in 1921, 1922, 1923 and 1925. Ferguson was a prolific composer, and wrote tunes such as the 2/4 marches "Clan MacRae Society Pipe Band" and "The Atholl and Breadalbane Gathering."

After Ferguson was injured in an accident, Hamish McColl, a longstanding member of the band, took over as pipe major. After 18 months, McColl was succeeded by John Findlay Nicoll, who led the band to first place at the Worlds in 1932, 1933 and 1934.

Nicoll resigned due to ill-health in 1950 and was succeeded by Alexander Macleod, a pupil of Ferguson. The band under Macleod won the World Championships again in 1953.

The band was downgraded to Grade 2, but won the Grade 2 World Championships under Pipe Major John Finlay.

In 1966, some members left the band and later formed the Glasgow Skye Association Pipe Band. More members left in the following years and the band closed down in 1972.
