= World Pipe Band Championships =

Annual event in Glasgow in Scotland

Coordinates: 55.8523°N 4.2424°W

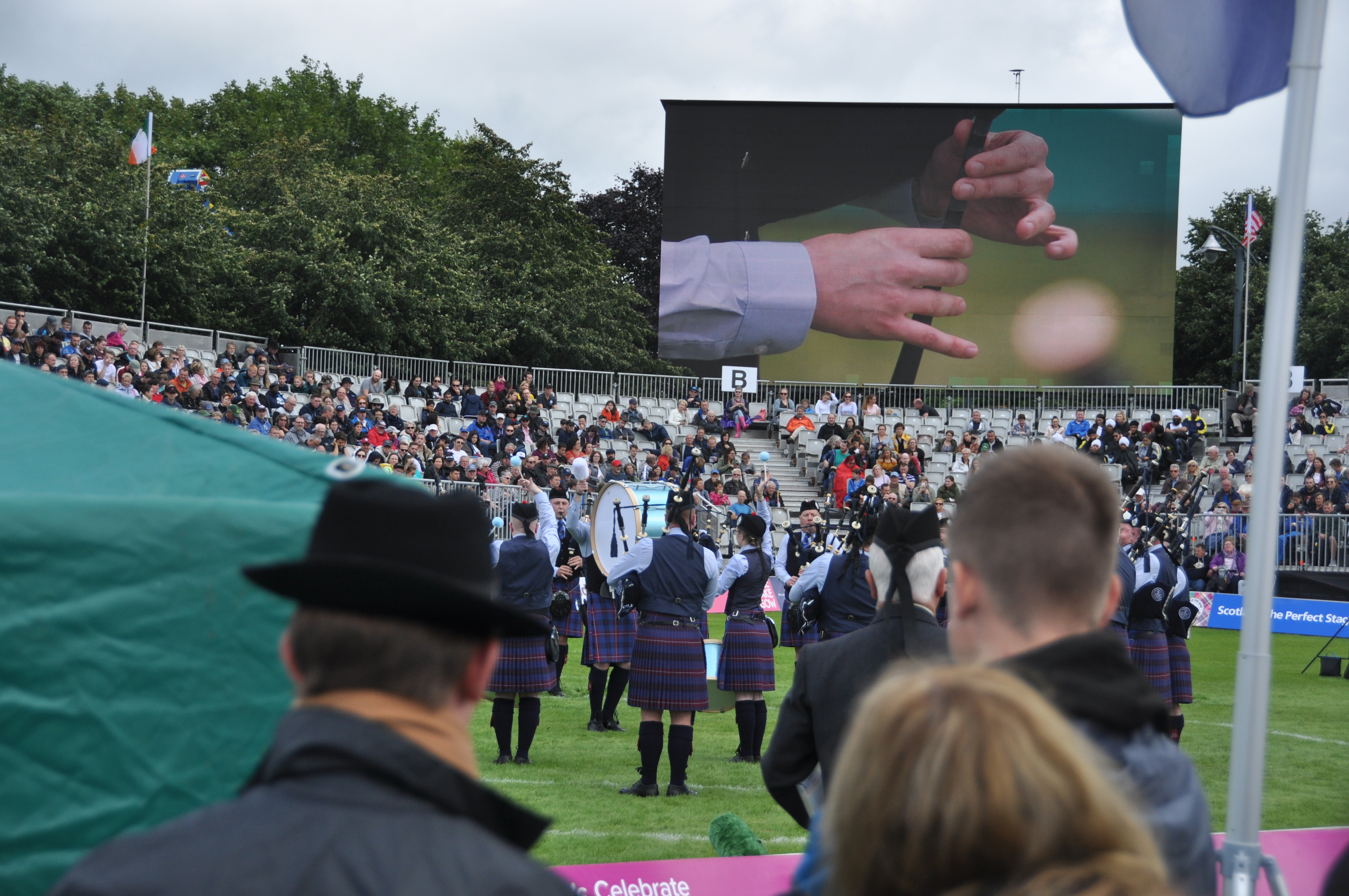
- Grade 1 Arena at the Championships
- Genre: Pipe Band competition
- Frequency: Annually
- Location: Glasgow Green
- Years active: 1947–present
- Current Champions: Simon Fraser University Pipe Band
- Sponsor: Glasgow Life
- Website: https://www.glasgowlife.org.uk/arts-music-and-culture/world-pipe-band-championships

The World Pipe Band Championships is a pipe band competition held in Glasgow, Scotland.

== Overview ==
The World Pipe Band Championships have been staged since 1947, although the Grade 1 Pipe Band Competition winners at the annual Cowal Highland Gathering were recognised as World Champions as far back as 1906. The current venue is Glasgow Green.

There are no qualifications to enter, and bands do not have to enter or win any other competitions. The only requirement is the band is a member of the RSPBA or a Pipe Band Association recognized by the RSPBA.

== Structure of the competition ==
Normally several hundred bands will attend, traveling from all over the world. Competition starts at 9 am.

Depending on the size of the grade - or in the case of Grade One, where a band has not secured automatic qualification - bands are required to perform in a qualifying round which takes place in the morning. The top bands at the end of the qualifying round will play in a second event in the afternoon to determine the winner.

To win, Grade One bands must perform in two events, a March, Strathspey and Reel event (known as an "MSR") consisting of three pre-arranged tunes - one March, one Strathspey, and one Reel, followed by a Medley event, which consists of a short selection of music chosen and arranged by the band. The band must prepare two MSR sets and two Medley sets, and then play one. This is drawn on the line.

From 2019, the Grade 1 contest was adjusted so that the performances of bands on the Friday would now count.

== Format ==
Until 2013, the World Championships took place on one day in August.

Since 2013 the Championships have been held over two days. For all but Grade One bands, the competition remains as it was, with each grade competing in morning qualifiers and afternoon finals on either Saturday or Sunday. For Grade One, all the bands (there will be no more automatic qualifiers for the finals) will be required to compete in a qualifying round on Friday, playing an MSR and a Medley. The 12 bands that qualify for the finals will then play a different MSR and Medley in Saturday's final for the championship.

In 2014, the schedule was changed to hold the Grade 1 qualifying rounds on Friday, and the Grade 1 finals along with the lower grade qualifiers and finals on Saturday.

In 2019, the grade one format was changed due to a smaller contest. "Grade 1 at the World Pipe Band Championships will be a two-day event with 15 bands playing both of the MSRs and medleys, one each on separate days, with all performances counting towards the final result." Every Grade 1 band has 2 separate MSRs and Medleys and is able to choose which one they play on Friday and then must play the alternate set on Saturday.

Four judges individually assess either the piping, drumming, or ensemble of each performance. There are two piping judges, one ensemble judge, and one drumming judge. Each judge awards each band a place in piping, drumming, or ensemble, with the placing giving a band the same number of points at that placing. For example, a band with a two firsts in piping, a third in ensemble, and second in drumming would be awarded seven points. The band with the lowest point total is the winner.

Live streaming on social media is forbidden.

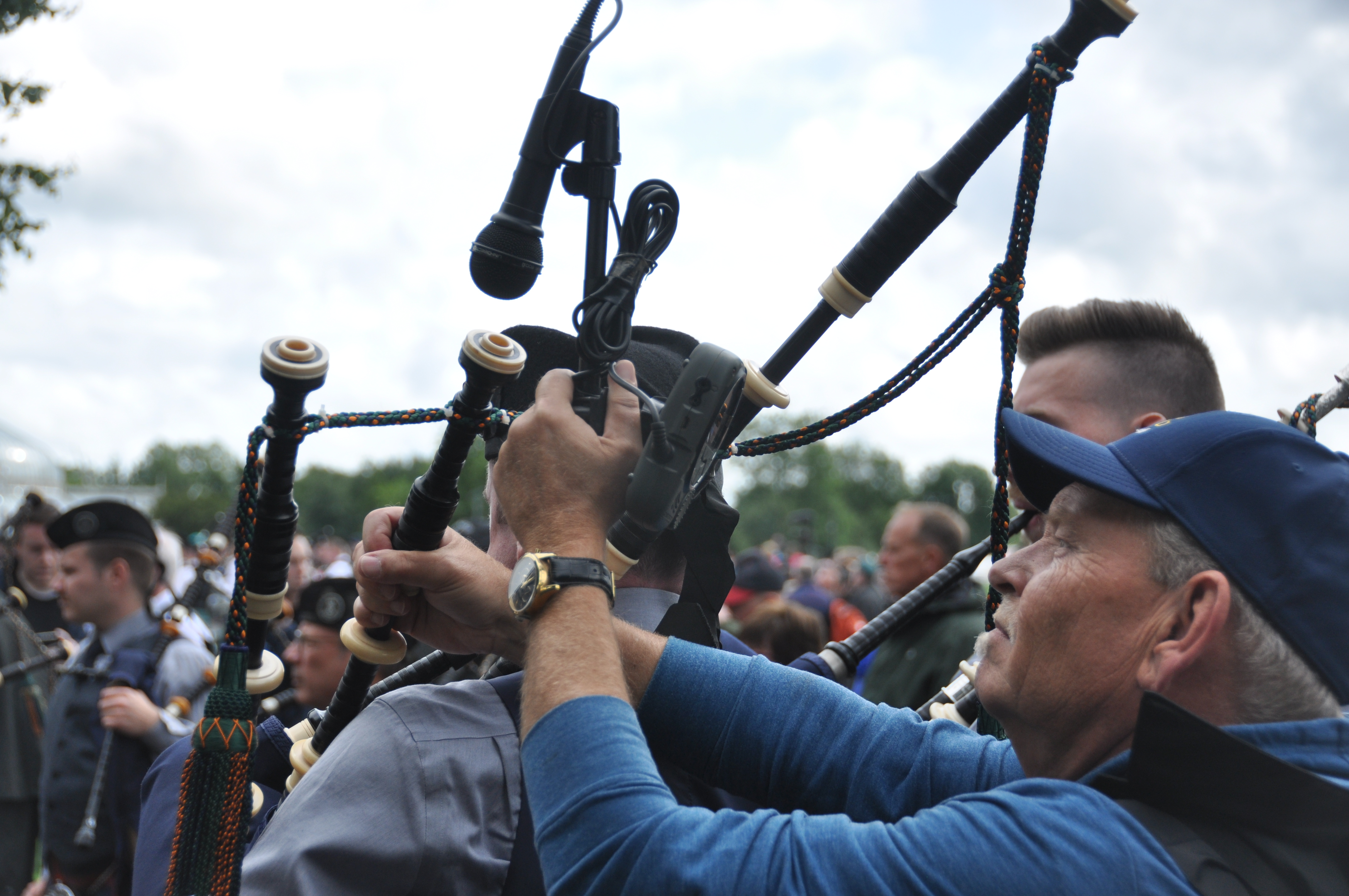
Drone tuner at the Championshipt

== Competition grade system ==
Prizes at the Worlds are awarded in the following nine categories:

- Grade One
- Grade Two
- Grade Three "A"
- Grade Three "B"
- Juvenile
- Grade Four "A"
- Grade Four "B"
- Novice Juvenile "A"
- Novice Juvenile "B"

In the Novice Juvenile and Juvenile categories, band members must be under the age of eighteen, with the exception of one "adult" player, often instructors, who may serve as the Pipe Major or Pipe Sergeant. The remaining categories have no age restriction, but are based on proficiency. Grade One is the highest of these categories, and Novice is the lowest. Grading and eligibility are overseen by the Royal Scottish Pipe Band Association (RSPBA), and bands must apply for downgrading or upgrading.

Because of time constraints, the RSPBA uses "A" and "B" designations in Grade 3 and 4, for major competitions. By doing this, bands are grouped based on prior-years' performances, and can receive promotions within their respective grade. It is also important to note that these vary slightly throughout the world. For example, in North America, many regional associations have implemented Grade Five, an entry-level Grade, intended to help bands familiarize themselves with competition and in Australia, New Zealand and Northern Ireland there is no Novice grade at all. There is also no Juvenile grade in Northern Ireland.

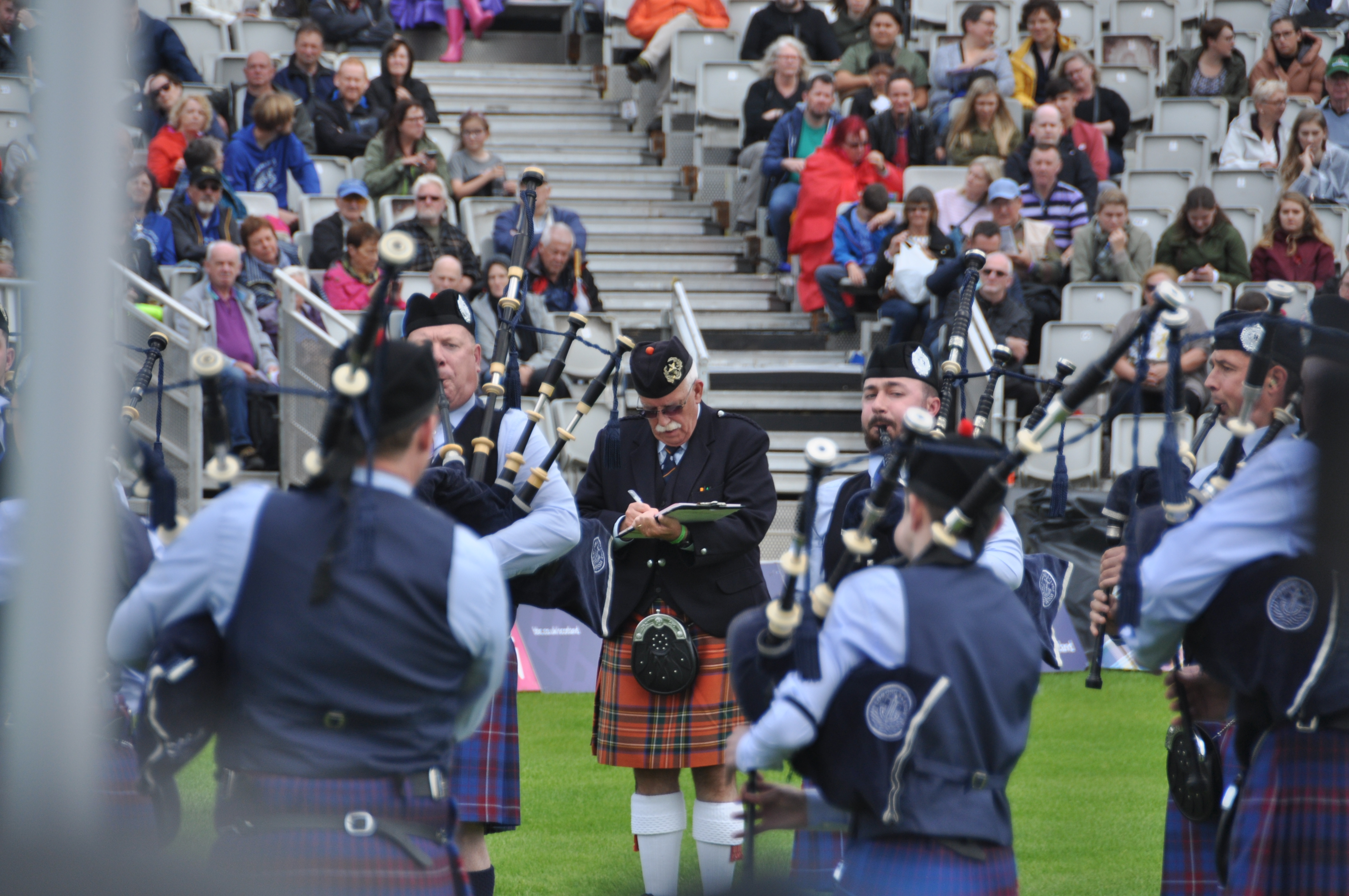
RSPBA Judge, James Wark, in the Grade 1 Arena

== Championship reigns ==
The highly coveted Grade One title remained in Scotland until 1987, when the Canadian 78th Fraser Highlanders Pipe Band became the first overseas band to win the award. In recent years, the title has travelled to Canada a further seven times with Simon Fraser University Pipe Band, Northern Ireland 13 times with the Field Marshal Montgomery Pipe Band, Australia with the Victoria Police Pipe Band in 1998, and the Republic of Ireland with the St. Laurence O'Toole Pipe Band in 2010.

The most successful pipe bands in this competition remain the Strathclyde Police Pipe Band (known as City of Glasgow Police Pipe Band from 1912 to 1975) winning 20 times between 1920 and 1991, and the Shotts and Dykehead Caledonia Pipe Band (winning 16 times). Other multiple World Champions include the Muirhead & Sons Pipe Band (8 times), the Clan MacRae Society Pipe Band (eight times), and the Edinburgh Police Pipe Band (8 times).

== Grade 1 results ==
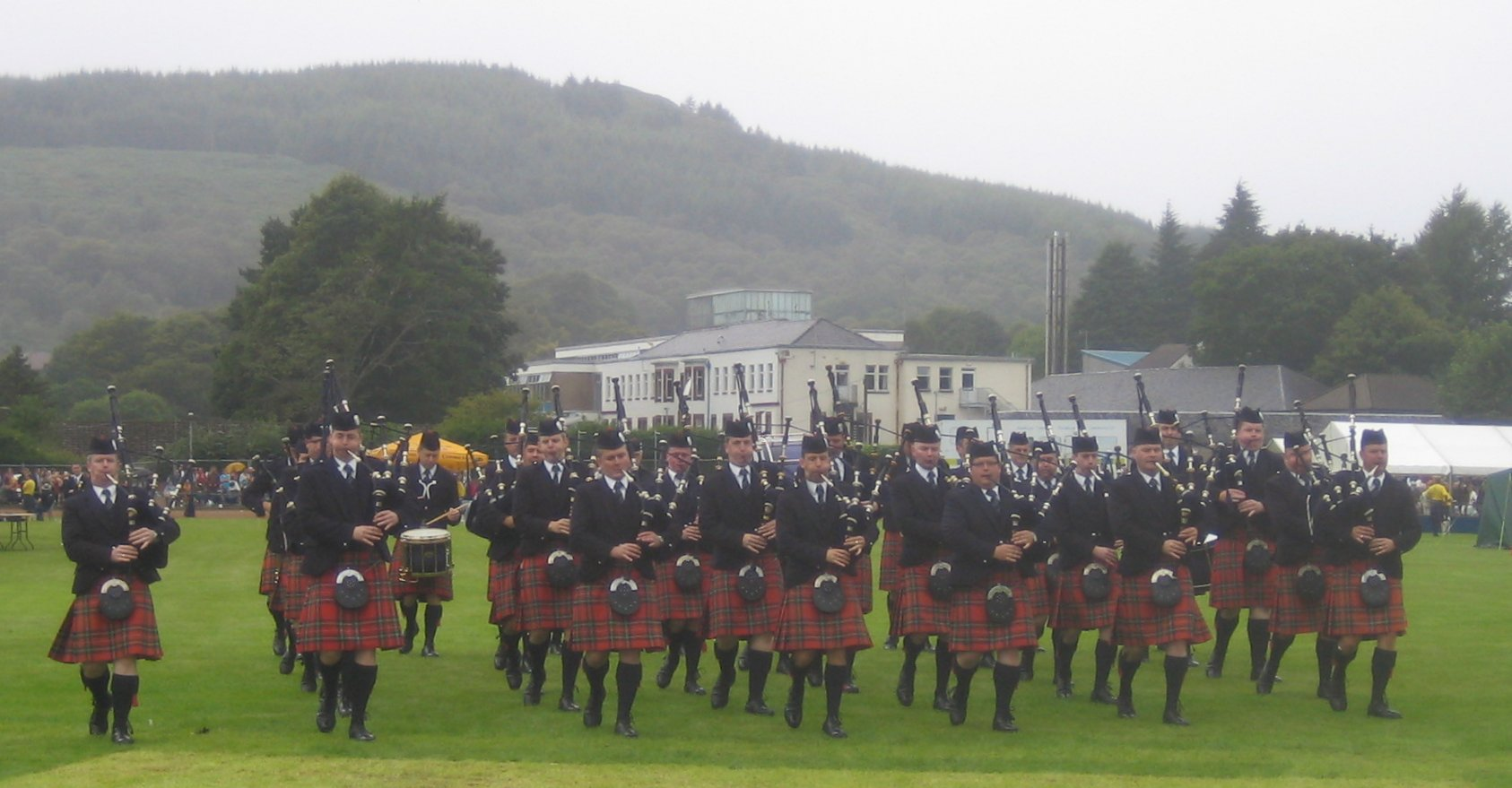
The most successful pipe band, Strathclyde Police, pictured in 2007

(C) indicates Champion of Champions

* indicates Best Drum Corps

Year	1st place	2nd place	3rd place
2026	Simon Fraser University	Field Marshal Montgomery (C)	Boghall & Bathgate
2025	Inveraray & District*	Field Marshal Montgomery	Shotts & Dykehead Caledonia
2024	Inveraray & District (C)	Field Marshal Montgomery	Simon Fraser University
2023	Boghall & Bathgate	Field Marshal Montgomery	Inveraray & District (C)
2022	Field Marshal Montgomery	Inveraray & District (C)	ScottishPower Pipe Band
2021 2020	No Championships were held during COVID-19 pandemic		
2019	Inveraray & District (C)	Field Marshal Montgomery	St. Laurence O'Toole*
2018	Field Marshal Montgomery	Inveraray & District (C)	St. Laurence O'Toole*
2017	Inveraray & District* (C)	Field Marshal Montgomery	St. Laurence O'Toole
2016	Field Marshal Montgomery	Inveraray & District (C)	St. Laurence O'Toole*
2015	Shotts & Dykehead Caledonia	St. Laurence O'Toole*	Inveraray & District
2014	Field Marshal Montgomery (C)	Inveraray & District	St. Laurence O'Toole
2013	Field Marshal Montgomery* (C)	Boghall & Bathgate	ScottishPower Pipe Band
2012	Field Marshal Montgomery (C)	ScottishPower Pipe Band	Simon Fraser University
2011	Field Marshal Montgomery (C)	Simon Fraser University	ScottishPower Pipe Band
2010	St. Laurence O'Toole*	Field Marshal Montgomery (C)	Simon Fraser University (Note: The results were originally announced with Boghall and Bathgate Caledonia in 3rd place, but the RSPBA website states that "Simon Fraser University from Canada took 3rd spot on an Ensemble Preference from 4th placed Boghall and Bathgate Caledonia. Unfortuately this was announced the wrong way around and we apologise to both bands for this error.")
2009	Simon Fraser University*	Field Marshal Montgomery (C)	St. Laurence O'Toole
2008	Simon Fraser University*	Field Marshal Montgomery	House of Edgar - Shotts & Dykehead
2007	Field Marshal Montgomery (C)	Simon Fraser University	House of Edgar - Shotts & Dykehead
2006	Field Marshal Montgomery (C)	Simon Fraser University	House of Edgar - Shotts & Dykehead
2005	House of Edgar - Shotts & Dykehead*	Field Marshal Montgomery (C)	Simon Fraser University
2004	Field Marshal Montgomery (C)	Simon Fraser University*	House of Edgar - Shotts & Dykehead
2003	House of Edgar - Shotts & Dykehead*	Field Marshal Montgomery (C)	Simon Fraser University
2002	Field Marshal Montgomery (C)	Simon Fraser University	Shotts & Dykehead*
2001	Simon Fraser University	Shotts & Dykehead	Field Marshal Montgomery
2000	Shotts & Dykehead	Field Marshal Montgomery	Simon Fraser University
1999	Simon Fraser University*	Shotts & Dykehead	Field Marshal Montgomery
1998	Victoria Police	Shotts & Dykehead*	Field Marshal Montgomery
1997	Shotts & Dykehead*	Simon Fraser University	Victoria Police
1996	Simon Fraser University	Field Marshal Montgomery	Shotts & Dykehead*
1995	Simon Fraser University	Field Marshal Montgomery	Shotts & Dykehead*
1994	Shotts & Dykehead*	Boghall & Bathgate	Victoria Police
1993	Field Marshal Montgomery	Shotts & Dykehead*	Boghall & Bathgate
1992	Field Marshal Montgomery	Strathclyde Police	Victoria Police
1991	Strathclyde Police	Polkemmet Grorud	Power of Scotland
1990	Strathclyde Police	Power Of Scotland	ScotRail Vale Of Atholl
1989	Strathclyde Police	Power Of Scotland	ScotRail Vale Of Atholl
1988	Strathclyde Police	Simon Fraser University	78th Fraser Highlanders
1987	78th Fraser Highlanders*	Simon Fraser University	Strathclyde Police
1986	Strathclyde Police	78th Fraser Highlanders	Boghall & Bathgate*
1985	Strathclyde Police	Simon Fraser University	Polkemmet Grorud
1984	Strathclyde Police	Shotts & Dykehead*	78th Fraser Highlanders
1983	Strathclyde Police	Boghall & Bathgate*	Shotts & Dykehead
1982	Strathclyde Police	Boghall & Bathgate*	Dysart and Dundonald
1981	Strathclyde Police	Shotts & Dykehead	Boghall & Bathgate
1980	Shotts & Dykehead	Strathclyde Police	Polkemmet Colliery
1979	Strathclyde Police	Dysart and Dundonald	Shotts & Dykehead
1978	Dysart and Dundonald	Strathclyde Police	Shotts & Dykehead*
1977	Dysart and Dundonald	Strathclyde Police	Shotts & Dykehead
1976	Strathclyde Police		
1975	Lothian & Borders Police Pipe Band	Muirhead & Sons Pipe Band	
1974	Shotts & Dykehead	Dysart and Dundonald Pipe Band	
1973	Shotts & Dykehead*	City of Glasgow Police Pipe Band	Red Hackle Pipe Band
1972	Edinburgh City Police Pipe Band	Red Hackle Pipe Band	Muirhead & Sons Pipe Band
1971	Edinburgh City Police Pipe Band	Shotts & Dykehead*	City of Glasgow Police Pipe Band
1970	Shotts & Dykehead*	Muirhead & Sons Pipe Band	Edinburgh City Police Pipe Band
1969	Muirhead & Sons Pipe Band		
1968	Muirhead & Sons Pipe Band		Red Hackle Pipe Band
1967	Muirhead & Sons Pipe Band	City of Glasgow Police Pipe Band	Invergordon Distillery Pipe Band
1966	Muirhead & Sons Pipe Band	City of Glasgow Police Pipe Band	Invergordon Distillery Pipe Band
1965	Muirhead & Sons Pipe Band		
1964	Edinburgh City Police Pipe Band		
1963	Edinburgh City Police Pipe Band		
1962	277 (Argyll And Sutherland Highlanders) Field Regiment, Royal Artillery (T.A.)	Edinburgh City Police Pipe Band	Renfrew Pipe Band
1961	Muirhead & Sons Pipe Band		
1960	Shotts & Dykehead*		Bucksburn & District Pipe Band
1959	Shotts & Dykehead*		
1958	Shotts & Dykehead*		Edinburgh City Police Pipe Band
1957	Shotts & Dykehead*	Renfrew Pipe Band	Clan MacRae Society Pipe Band
1956	Muirhead & Sons Pipe Band	Renfrew Pipe Band	Shotts & Dykehead
1955	Muirhead & Sons Pipe Band		
1954	Edinburgh City Police Pipe Band	Red Hackle Pipe Band*	Muirhead & Sons Pipe Band
1953	Clan MacRae Society Pipe Band	Muirhead & Sons Pipe Band	Red Hackle Pipe Band
1952	Shotts & Dykehead		
1951	City of Glasgow Police Pipe Band	Muirhead & Sons Pipe Band	
1950	Edinburgh City Police Pipe Band	Dalziel Highland Pipe Band	
1949	City of Glasgow Police Pipe Band		
1948	Shotts & Dykehead		
1947	Bowhill Colliery Pipe Band	Clan MacRae Society Pipe Band	Bonhill Parish Pipe Band
1946	City of Glasgow Police Pipe Band		
1940–1945	No Championships were held during World War II		
1939	City of Glasgow Police Pipe Band	Glasgow Corporation Transport	Edinburgh City Police Pipe Band
1938	City of Glasgow Police Pipe Band	Glasgow Corporation Transport	Clan MacRae Society Pipe Band
1937	City of Glasgow Police Pipe Band		
1936	City of Glasgow Police Pipe Band		
1935	MacLean Pipe Band		
1934	Clan MacRae Society Pipe Band		
1933	Clan MacRae Society Pipe Band		
1932	Clan MacRae Society Pipe Band		
1931	Glasgow Corporation Transport	Clan MacRae Society Pipe Band	
1930	Millhall Pipe Band	Glasgow Corporation Transport	MacLean Pipe Band
1929	Glasgow Corporation Transport		
1928	MacLean Pipe Band	Clan MacRae Society Pipe Band	
1927	MacLean Pipe Band	Clan MacRae Society Pipe Band	
1926	Millhall Pipe Band	Clan MacRae Society Pipe Band	
1925	Clan MacRae Society Pipe Band	Millhall Pipe Band	MacLean Pipe Band
1924	Millhall Pipe Band	Clan MacRae Society Pipe Band	
1923	Clan MacRae Society Pipe Band		
1922	Clan MacRae Society Pipe Band		
1921	Clan MacRae Society Pipe Band		
1920	City of Glasgow Police Pipe Band		
1919	Edinburgh City Police Pipe Band		
1914–1918	No Championships were held during World War I		
1913	7th Battalion Highland Light Infantry		
1912	5th Battalion Highland Light Infantry		Stonehouse Pipe Band
1911	5th Battalion Highland Light Infantry		
1910	5th Battalion Highland Light Infantry		
1909	Stonehouse Pipe Band		
1908	5th Battalion Highland Light Infantry		
1907	3rd Volunteer Battalion H.L.I.		
1906	1st Volunteer Battalion H.L.I.	Govan Police	Tie: 3rd Volunteer Battalion H.L.I. Queen's R.V.B. (Royal Scots)

== Most successful bands ==
The following is a list of some of the most successful pipe bands at the world championships.

Place	Band	Wins
1	Strathclyde Police Pipe Band	20
2	Shotts and Dykehead Caledonia Pipe Band	16
3	Field Marshal Montgomery Pipe Band	13
4	Clan MacRae Society Pipe Band	8
4	Muirhead & Sons Pipe Band	8
6	Simon Fraser University	7
