= Field Marshal Montgomery Pipe Band =

Northern Irish pipe band

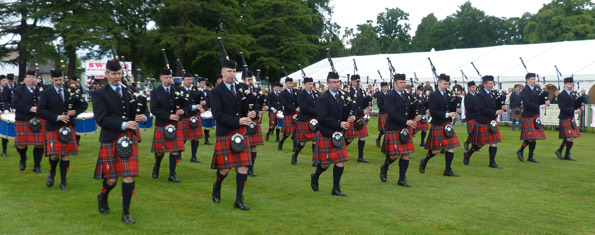
- Established: 1945
- Location: Lisburn, Northern Ireland
- Grade: 1
- Pipe major: Matt Wilson
- Drum sergeant: Willie Glenholmes
- Tartan: Drumalig
- Notable honours: World Champions: 1992, 1993, 2002, 2004, 2006, 2007, 2011, 2012, 2013, 2014, 2016, 2018, 2022 Scottish Champions: 1992, 1993, 1995, 1999, 2000, 2003, 2004, 2005, 2006, 2009, 2010, 2011, 2012, 2013, 2014, 2022, 2023, 2025 British Champions: 1992, 1993, 2002, 2006, 2007, 2009, 2010, 2011, 2012, 2013, 2014 & 2015 United Kingdom Champions: 2014, 2015, 2016, 2017, 2022 & 2026 European Champions: 1993, 2000, 2001, 2002, 2004, 2005, 2007, 2008, 2009, 2011, 2013, 2015 2024 & 2026 Cowal Champions: 1990, 1992, 1993, 1997, 2001, 2002, 2004, 2007 2008, 2009, 2011 & 2013 All Ireland Champions: 1989, 1990, 1991, 1992, 1993, 1994, 1995, 1996, 1997, 1998, 1999, 2001, 2002, 2003, 2004, 2005, 2006, 2009, 2011, 2012, 2013, 2015, 2016, 2017, 2018, 2022, 2023 & 2025 Ulster Champions: 1989, 1990, 1992, 1993, 1994, 1995, 1996, 1997, 1998, 1999, 2000, 2001, 2002, 2003, 2004, 2005, 2006, 2008, 2009, 2010, 2011, 2012, 2013, 2015 & 2016 RSPBA Champion of Champions: 1992, 1993, 2002, 2003, 2004, 2006, 2007, 2009, 2010, 2011, 2012, 2013, 2014, 2015 & 2022
- Website: www.fmmpb.com

The Field Marshal Montgomery Pipe Band is a competitive grade one pipe band from Lisburn, Northern Ireland named in honour of Field Marshal Viscount Montgomery of Alamein. The band has won the World Pipe Band Championships 13 times, making it the third most successful competing pipe band in history behind the Strathclyde Police Pipe Band and the Shotts and Dykehead Caledonia Pipe Band.

== History ==
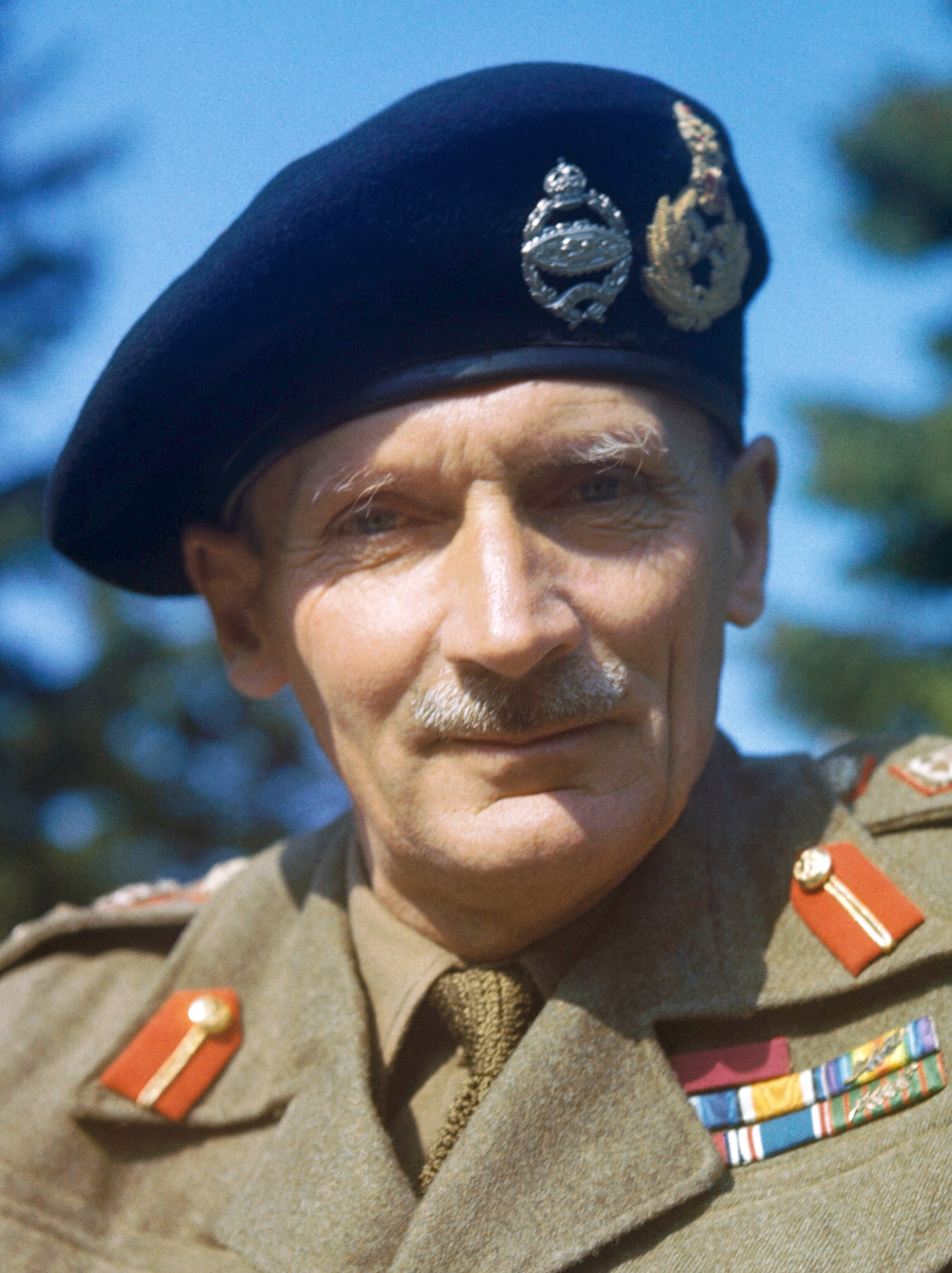
Field Marshal Sir Bernard Montgomery

The band was founded in 1945 in the townland of Drumalig, a few miles from Carryduff on the outskirts of Belfast. A group of farmer’s sons had decided to form a band and name it after Field Marshal Bernard Montgomery. The youths wrote to Montgomery to ask for permission to use his name, and as well as allowing them to use his name he donated ten shillings to their funds. In the years to follow, the band successfully worked its way through the lower grades, led by its first pipe major Billy Maxwell, who later became band president, and later by Sandy Cumming.

Around 1970 Field Marshal merged with Raffrey Pipe Band to become Freymont, which played in Grade 3, but in 1976 it was decided to reform the band as Field Marshal Montgomery under the leadership of Ricky Newell owing to the balance of players in Freymont. The band achieved promotion to Grade 2 under Newell's leadership, but in the middle of 1981 Newell left after a disagreement and Richard Parkes became pipe major. Field Marshal was promoted to Grade 1 at the end of 1985, won its first Grade 1 Major Championship at Cowal in 1990, won its first World Championship in 1992, and then won every Major Championship in 1993.

From 2000 to 2009, the band won 28 major championships, including four World Championships and five runners-up awards. In 2004, Pipe Major Richard Parkes suffered a stroke, and the band was led by Alastair Dunn until Richard recovered and led the band to win the last three majors of the season. Parkes was awarded an MBE in the 2004 Birthday Honours for services to pipe band music in Northern Ireland.

The band has won the World Championships in 1992, 1993, 2002, 2004, 2006, 2007, 2011, 2012, 2013, 2014, 2016, 2018 and 2022, becoming the first band to win all the Major competitions in a single year more than once adding Grand Slams in 2011 and again in 2013 to their maiden Grand Slam in 1993. 2013 was also the first year that the Drum Corps won the world title.

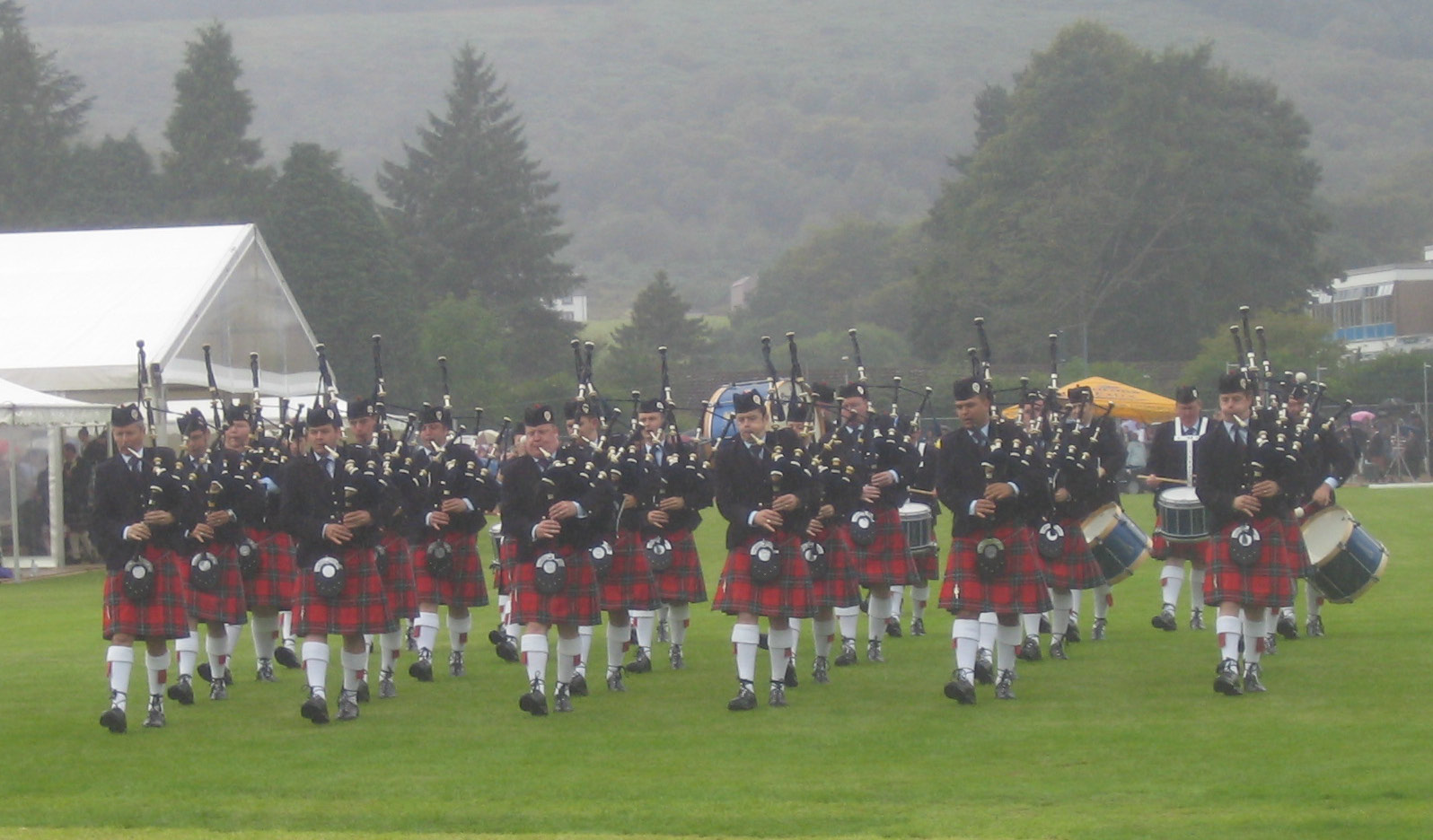
Field Marshal Montgomery Pipe Band in competition at the 2007 Cowal Pipe Band Championships

After 43 years, in September 2024, Richard Parkes retired as Pipe Major of the band. Matt Wilson, the band's pipe sergeant, took over the position.

== Honours ==
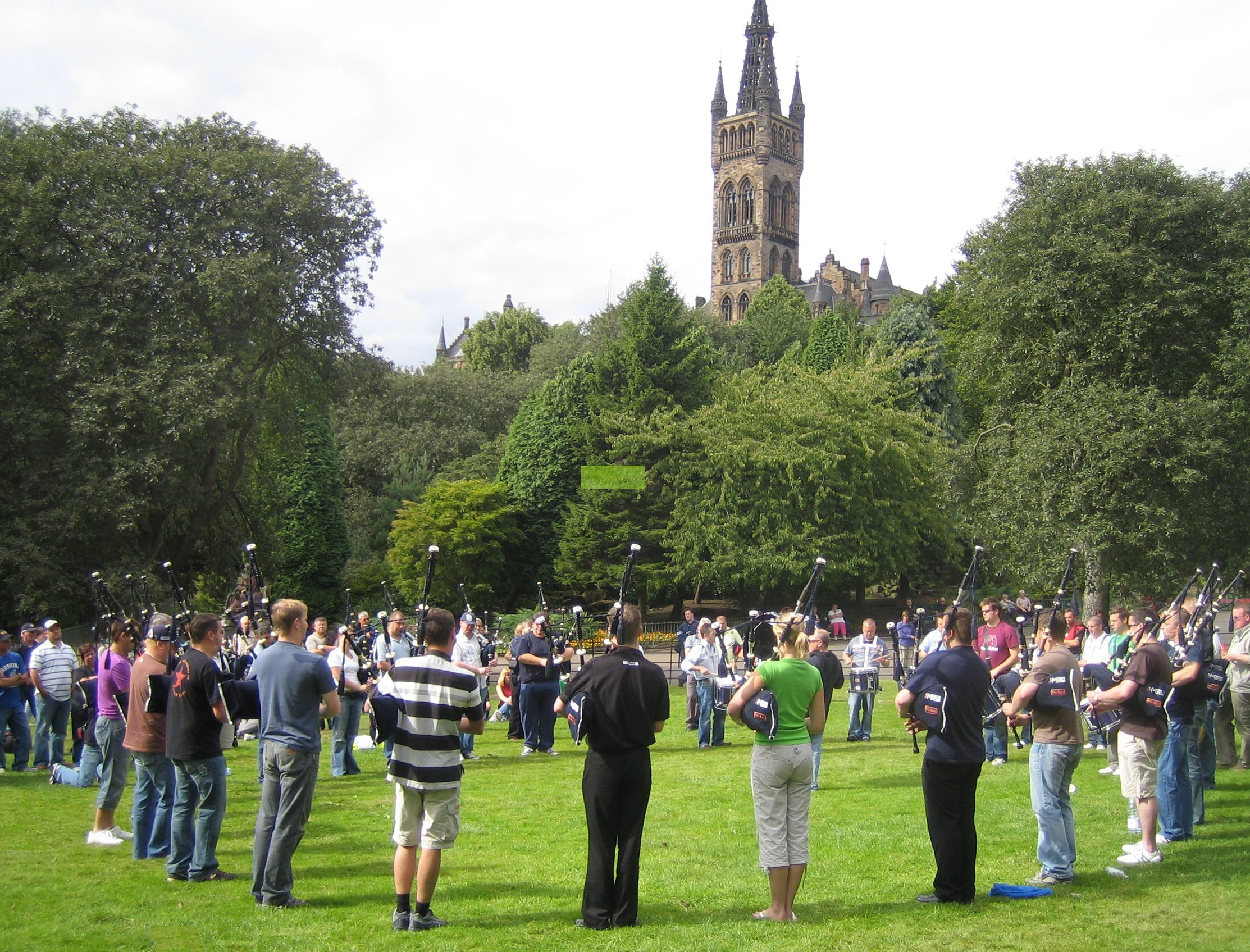
The band rehearsing for the 2006 World Championships in Kelvingrove Park

As of 2024 the band has won a total of 72 major championships, namely 17 Scottish Championships, 13 World Championships, 12 Cowal Championships, 13 European Championships, 12 British Championships, and 5 United Kingdom Championships. Further, the band has won 25 Ulster Championships, 27 All-Ireland Championships, and gained 15 RSPBA Champion of Champions titles. Since its first Grade 1 prize at a major championship in 1990, the band has never been out of the top six at any major championship in which it has competed, finishing in the prize list in over 150 championship competitions.

The Field Marshal Montgomery Pipe Band became the last band to win the Cowal Championship and thus Argyll Shield whilst it was still accredited RSPBA Major championship status.

== Pipe Majors ==
- William Maxwell (1945-1970)
- Sandy Cumming (1970-1975)
- Ricky Newell (1975-1981)
- Richard Parkes MBE (1981-2024)
- Matt Wilson (2024-present)

== Leading Drummers ==
- Donald McKay (1945-1950)
- Jim McMinn (1950-?)
- William Russell (?-1964)
- Jackson Shaw (1964-?)
- Harry Russell (?-1975)
- Richard Coffey (1975-1979)
- Gordon Parkes (1979-1998)
- Andrew Scullion (1998-2002)
- Keith Orr (2002-2022)
- Gareth McLees (2022-2024)
- Willie Glenholmes (2024-present)

== Bass Drummers ==
- Robert Coady

== Discography ==
- Debut (1991)
- Live In Concert (1996)
- Unplugged (2002)
- Re:Charged (2007)
- IMPACT (2016)
