= Vale of Atholl Pipe Band =

Scottish pipe band

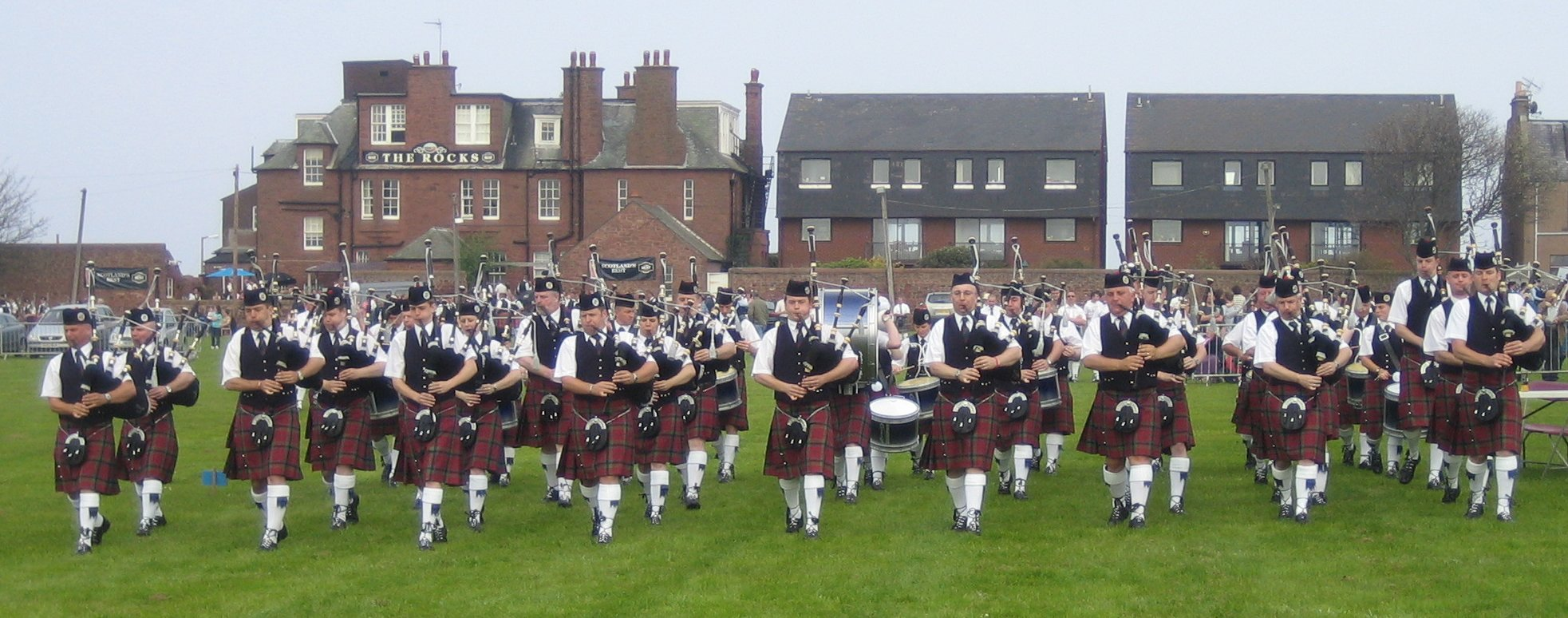
- Established: 1906
- Location: Perthshire, Scotland
- Grade: 3B and 4B
- Pipe major: Ben Foy (G3B); Tom Lewin (G4B)
- Drum sergeant: Henry Mccaskill (G3B); TBC (G4B)
- Tartan: Murray of Atholl
- Notable honours: G1 3rd place, World Pipe Band Championships 1989, 1990; G3A 1st place European Pipe Band Championships 2022, G3A 1st place British Championships 2022; G3A 1st place UK Championships 2024; G3A, 1st place British Championships 2024; G2 6th place UK Championships 2025
- Website: www.thevale.org

The Vale of Atholl Pipe Band is a Scottish pipe band organisation based in Perthshire, Scotland. It comprises two competitive pipe bands that compete in the Royal Scottish Pipe Band Association's competitions each year. The bands compete in Grades 3B and 4A. From 1983 until 2018 it also had a Grade 1 band. It also had a G2 band for the 2025 season.

== History ==
The organisation was founded in 1906 as the Vale of Atholl Pipers Association, with the Marquess of Tullibardine as patron and led by pipe major Mitchell Pirnie. The band started in competing in competition in 1931 under the leadership of Robert Pirnie, and played at the Coronation of Queen Elizabeth II in 1953.

Ian Duncan, brother of Gordon Duncan, joined the band in 1965 and took over as Pipe Major in 1973. The band first entered competitions organised by the Royal Scottish Pipe Band Association in 1977, starting in Grade 4, but by 1983 the band had been promoted to Grade 1. The band came second in the Champion of Champions table during the 1980s, and won the European and British Championship titles in 1988 and 1989 respectively. In 1993, the band reached a sponsorship agreement with Macnaughtons of Pitlochry, and changed its tartan from traditional Murray of Atholl tartan to the Muted Macnaughton. For much of this period, the organisation had a feeder system of youngsters who competed in the Novice Juvenile and Juvenile grades.

Andy Renwick succeeded Ian Duncan as Pipe Major of the Grade 1 band at the end of 2000, and in 2002 sponsorship was secured with Robert Wiseman Dairies. Adrian Cramb took over the role of Pipe Major in 2008. Alastair ‘Bongo’ McNab took over the role of Lead Drummer in 2013, replacing Crawford Allan. By this time the organisation's Novice Juvenile and Juvenile bands were ended and replaced with Grade 3 and Grade 4 bands.

The G1 band halted operations in November 2018 leaving the organisation with G3A and G4A bands. In 2020 the band reverted to its original Murray of Atholl tartan.

In September 2024 the G3A band was promoted to G2 after successful prize-winning seasons in 2022, 2023 and 2024.

== Pipe Majors ==
- Mitchell Pirnie (1906–?)
- Robert Pirnie (?)
- Allan Cameron (?–1973)
- Ian Duncan (1973–2000)
- Andy Renwick (2000–2008)
- Adrian Cramb (2008–2018)
- Scott Oliphant, Angus Clarke, Graham Mulholland and Ross McNaughton have all been Pipe Majors of the Grades 3 and 4 bands.
- Mark Stewart (2020-2023)
- Kyle Howie (G3A 2023-2025) and Ciar Milne (G4A 2024-2025)
- Jamie Falconer (G2 2025-2025) and Irralee Stewart (G4A 2025-2025)

== Discography ==
- Cam ye By Atholl (1982)
- Both Sides of The Tracks (1985)
- Salutations (1988)
- No Reservations (1989)
- Live 'n Well: The Motherwell Concert (1995)
- Live from Frankfurt, Germany (2005)
- Back to The Future (2006)
