= Cowal Highland Gathering =

Annual Highland games in Scotland

- Official logo

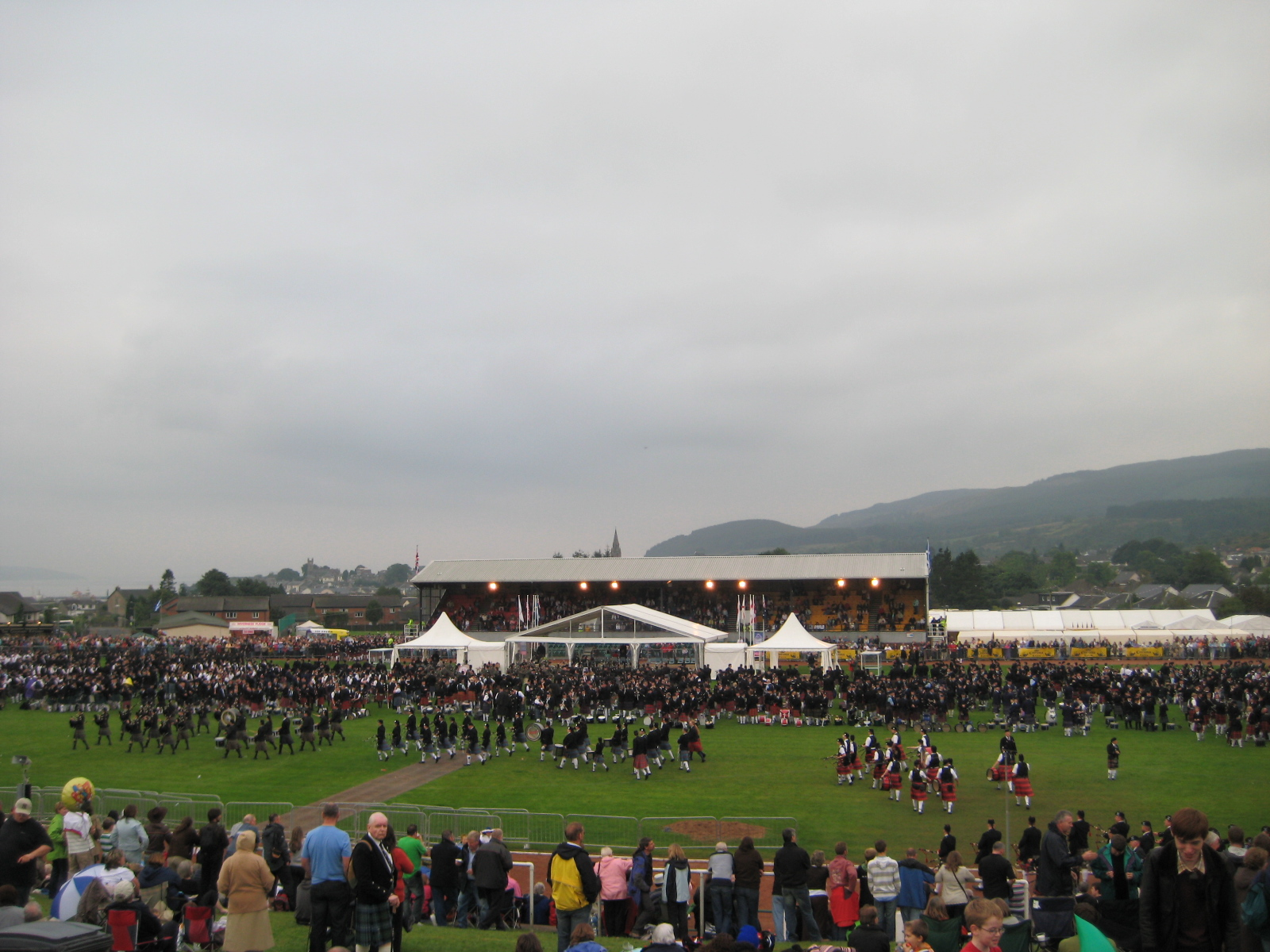
- Pipe bands filing into the stadium for the salute to the Chieftain and the award announcements at the 2008 event
- Dates: Final weekend in August annually
- Locations: Dunoon, Cowal
- Country: Scotland, United Kingdom
- Years active: 1894 – present
- Website: cowalgathering.com

The Cowal Highland Gathering (also known as the Cowal Games) is an annual Highland games held in Dunoon, Scotland, over the final weekend in August. It is held at Dunoon Stadium.

== History ==
The first record of an organised Highland games in the town is in 1871, the same year as the Argyllshire Gathering in Oban started. In subsequent years games were held at New Year. The organisation of the Cowal events and other games around Scotland was due to a wide interest in Highland sports, partly stemming from Queen Victoria's love of Scotland.

The event that would evolve into the Cowal Gathering was first held on 11 August 1894, and organised by local man Robert Cameron.

1906 saw the introduction of a pipe band competition for Army bands, at the suggestion of Malcolm McCulloch. Twenty-five bands entered in 1909, the first year that civilian bands were allowed to compete. The Argyll Shield, donated in 1906 by Princess Louise, Duchess of Argyll, is still awarded to the winning band in the Grade 1 competition.

The easy access of Dunoon by paddle steamer from Glasgow contributed to popularity of the games. The games also featured in early BBC television broadcasts.

The global COVID-19 pandemic saw the cancelling of the highland gathering for 2020 and 2021, events normally attracting in excess of 1500 competitors annually. This was due both to travel restrictions for international participants, as well as uncertainty health-wise. A "virtual gathering" was to be held for 2021, following a similar 2020 action.

== Events ==
=== Pipe band competition ===
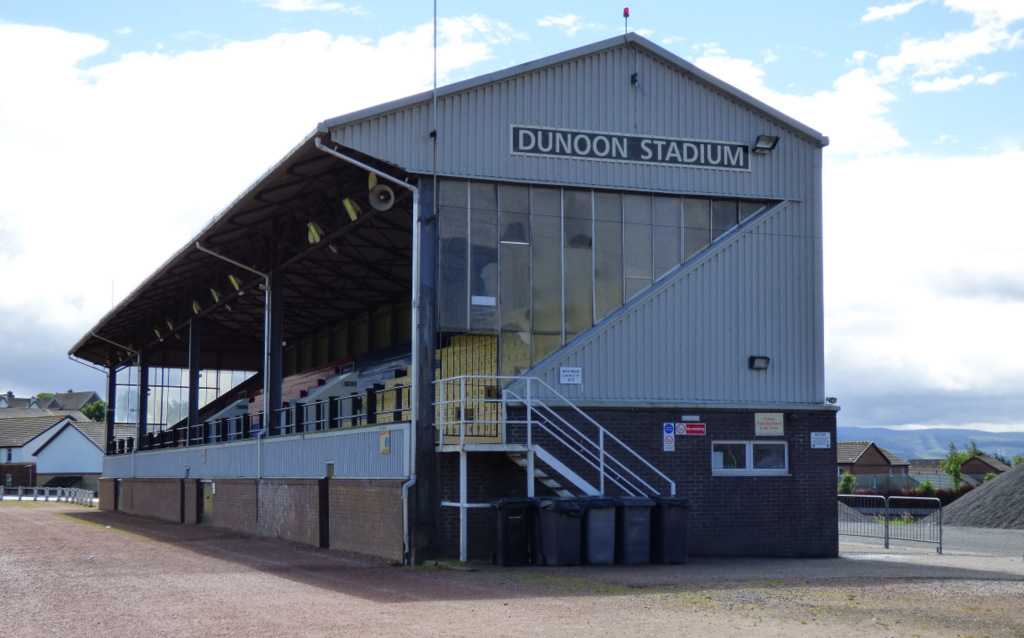
Dunoon Stadium, the venue for the field events

As the last major competition in the season, Cowal was historically where the Champion of Champions title for the best overall performance in the major competitions of the season was decided and awarded. Until the World Pipe Band Championships started in Glasgow in 1947, Cowal was regarded as the premier pipe band competition.

Following discussions between the Gathering Committee and the RSPBA, it was decided that after 2013 Cowal would lose its status as a major competition due to difficulties accommodating the number of bands. The pipe band competition continues to be held but with a reduced number of entrants.

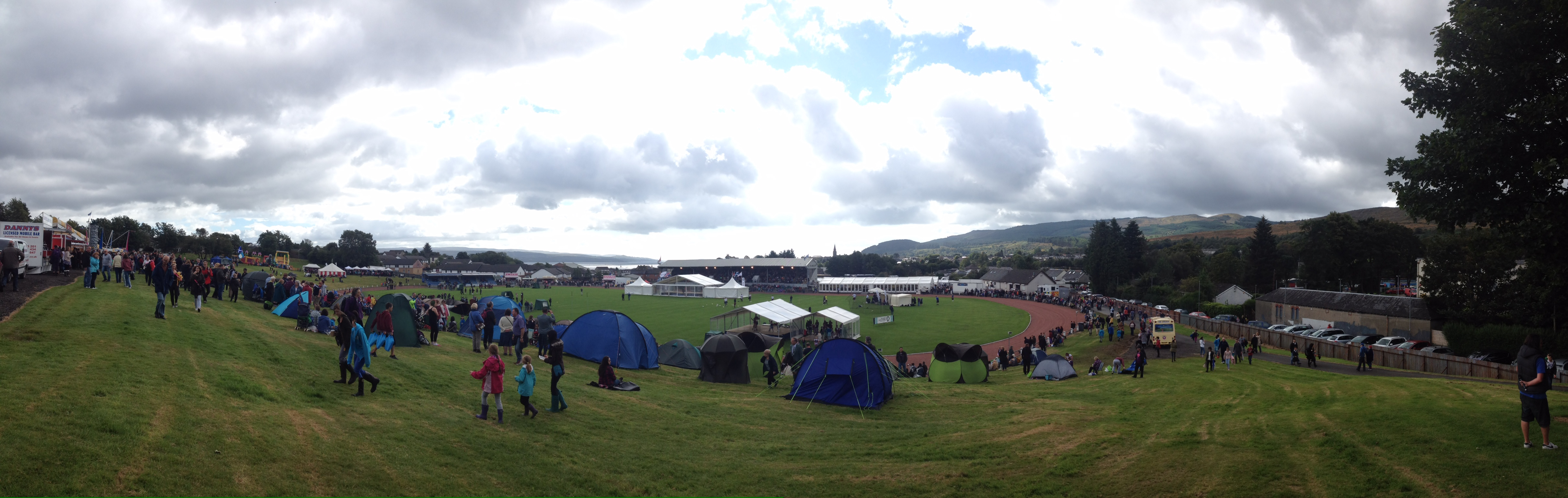
Panoramic view of the 2014 event

=== Solo bagpipe competition ===
The Games hosts open graded pibroch, march, and strathspey and reel competitions, as well as juvenile and local restricted competitions.

=== Highland dancing championships ===
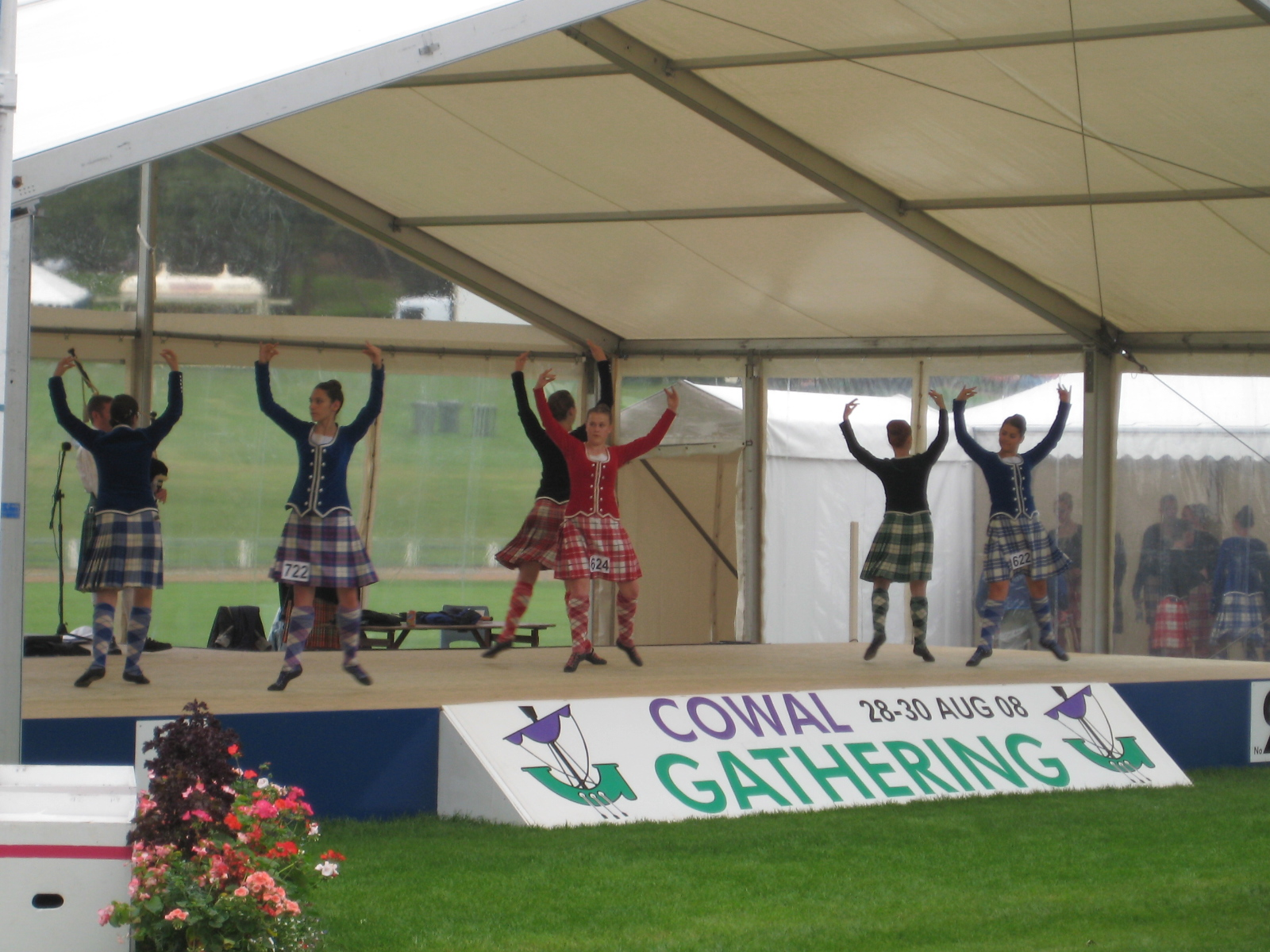
Highland dancers competing

At the games are held the Scottish National Highland Dancing Championships which is only open to Scottish residents, the Scottish (open) Highland Dancing Championships and the qualifiers and finals of the World Championships.

The world final qualifiers happen on the Thursday at the same time as the Scottish (open) Championships for dancers age 12 and over. The top 20 dancers from each age category (Juvenile – 12–15 inclusive, Junior – 16–17 inclusive, and Adult – 18+) get to dance on the Saturday for the World Championships. To ensure that there is a range of ages in the 12-15 category, four dancers are selected from the 12 years, four from the 13 years, and six each from the 14 years and 15 years. The older categories select their top 20 based on two separate heats which are randomised. The heats are about the same standard overall and the top ten from each category get to dance on the Saturday for a chance at winning the World Championship title. For dancers under the age of 12, there are no qualifiers as the Scottish Championship title is the highest award for the age group.

The Scottish National Championships are held on the Friday with almost all categories being single age groups, the only exceptions being the 7–8 years, the 18–20 years, and the 21+.

The Saturday morning plays host to the local Argyllshire championships and pre-premier competitions before the main events of the World Championship Finals. At the conclusion of the final event and the trophies being awarded, the three world champions dance one final dance to acknowledge their achievement.

=== Sports ===
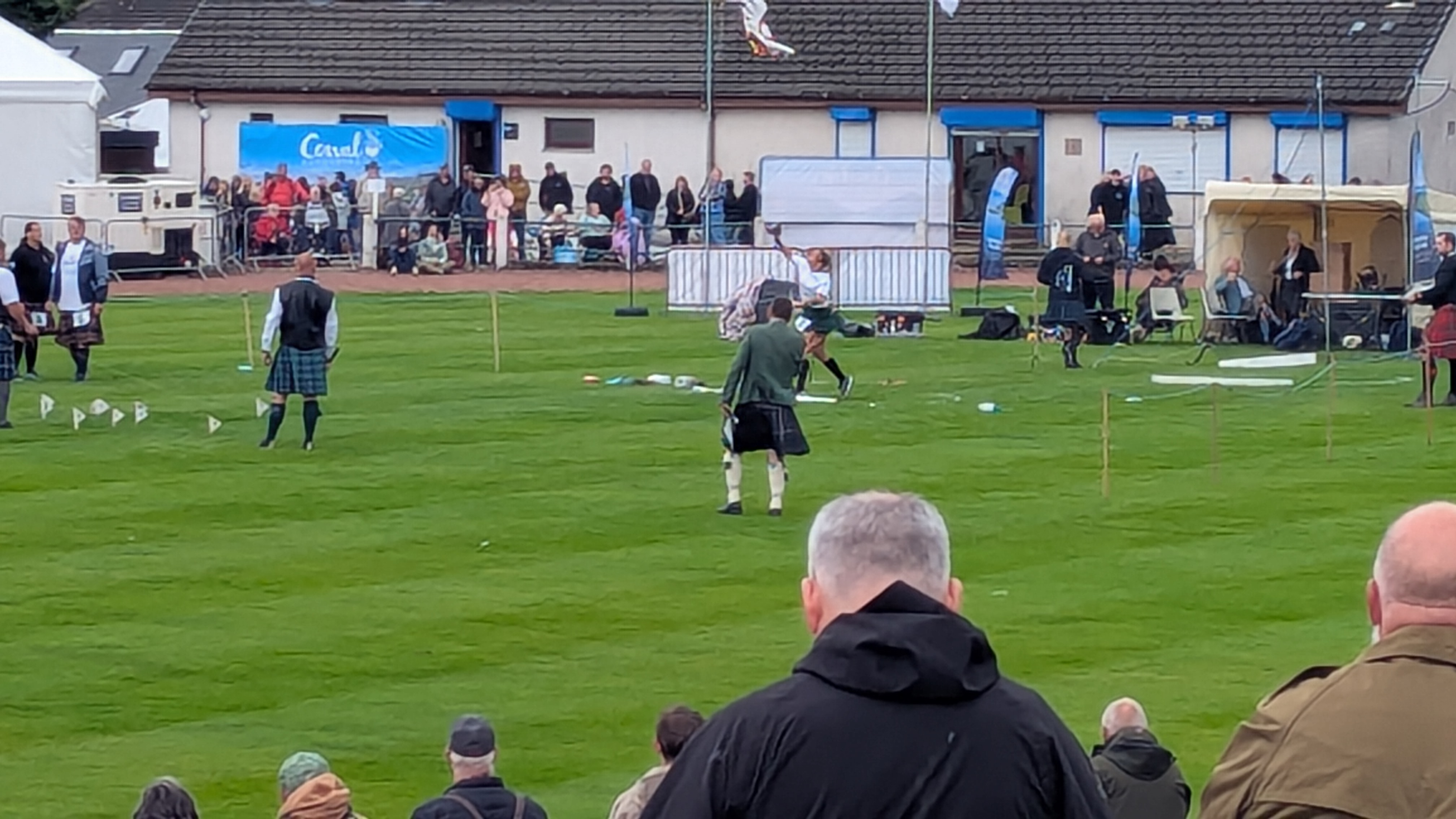
Emmerleigh Smith (2025 winner) putting the shot

The Games features a variety of traditional Highland games events, including the shot put, caber toss, weight throw, weight over bar and hammer throw, as part of an international competition. The shot put is done with both a standard 16 pounds (7.3 kg) shot and with the naturally formed 34 pounds (15 kg) Cowal Stone.

There is a 5-kilometre fun run and a hill race from the stadium to the top of Tom Odhar and back again, and since 2007 there has been a Scottish backhold wrestling competition.
