= List of marching bands =

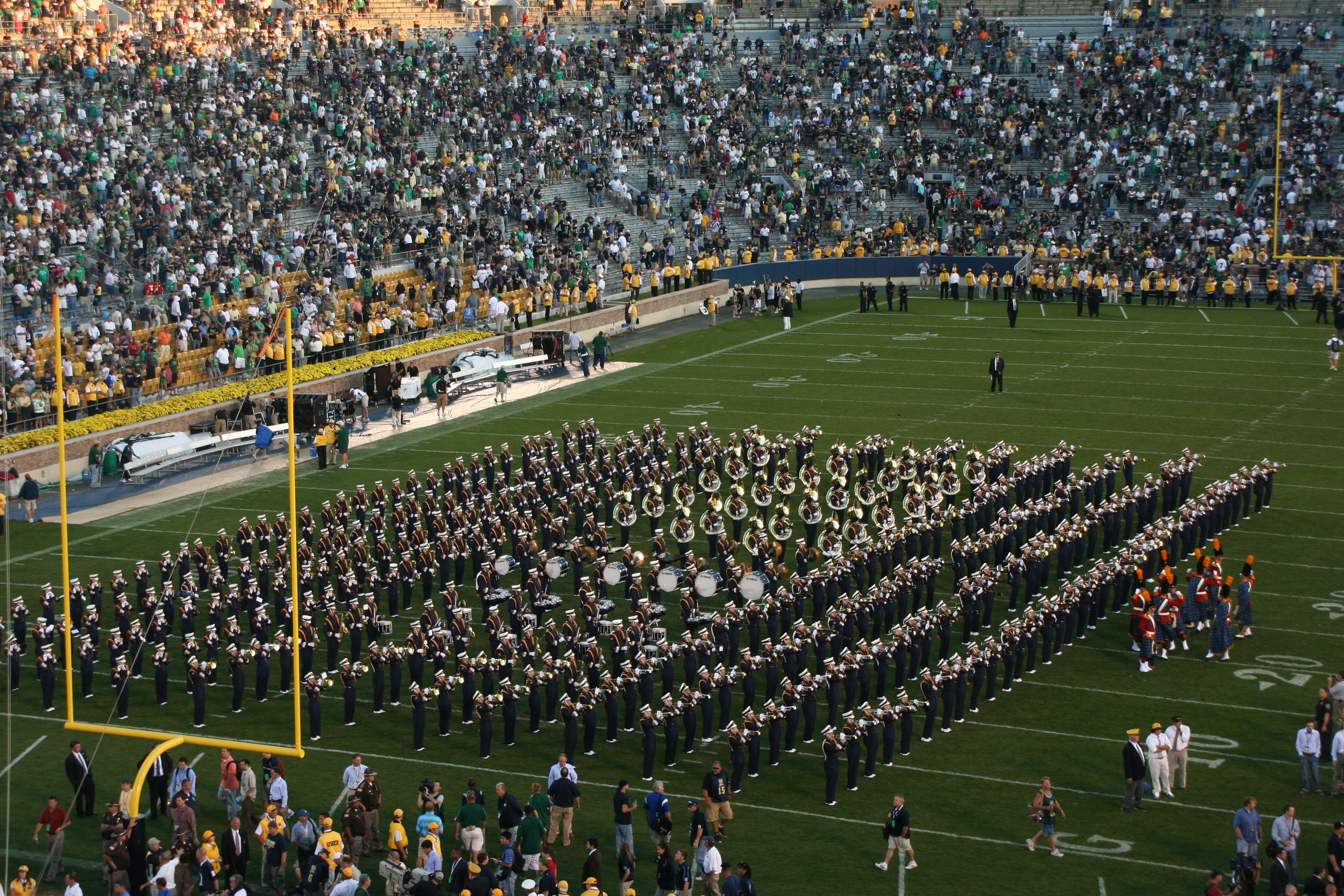
The Band of the Fighting Irish at the University of Notre Dame performs at the end of a football game

This is a list of marching bands. Major types include collegiate and military. At least 16 U.S. colleges have had scramble bands, which are also included in this list.

== North America ==
=== United States ===
==== LGBTQ+ marching bands (Pride Bands Alliance) ====
- Queer Big Apple Corps
- San Francisco Lesbian/Gay Freedom Band
- Freedom Band of Los Angeles
- Pride of Indy Band and Color Guard

==== Police bands ====
- NYPD Police Band
- Milwaukee Police Band

==== NFL marching bands ====
- Baltimore's Marching Ravens
- Washington Commanders Marching Band
- Green Bay Packer Lumberjack Band (defunct)

==== National marching bands ====
- Macy's Great American Marching Band (All American Marching Band)
- U.S. Army All-American Marching Band

==== Marching band festivals and competitions ====
- Collegiate Marching Band Festival
- Honda Battle of the Bands
- Bands of America
- USBands
- Winter Guard International
- Drum Corps International

=== Canada ===
- 78th Highlanders (Halifax Citadel) Pipe Band
- The Carnival Band (Canadian band)
- Hamilton Police Pipe Band
- Ceremonial Band of the Waterloo Regional Police
- Royal Military College of Canada Bands – college
- Simon Fraser University Pipe Band – college
- Toronto Police Pipe Band
- Western Mustang Band – college
- Windsor Police Pipe Band – police
- University of British Columbia Thunderbird Marching Band – college
- Toronto Signals Band
- Oshawa Civic Band
- Calgary Round-Up Band
- Calgary Stampede Showband
- Our Lady of the Rockies High School
- Red Deer Royals Marching Showband
- Lady Godiva Memorial Bnad [sic] – scramble

== Europe ==
=== Austria ===
- Guggenmusik

=== Great Britain ===
- Royal Marines Band Service – military
- Royal Corps of Army Music – military
- RAF Pipe Bands Association – military
- RAF Voluntary Bands – military
- Royal Air Force Music Services – military
- Cassino Band of Northumbria Army Cadet Force – military
- Ambassadors Showband Derby - college
- The Chesterfield Musketeers Showband – English
- Christ's Hospital Band - college
- Dagenham Girl Pipers – English
- Derby Serenaders - show band
- Hertfordshire Showband – English
- Romford Drum & Trumpet Corps – English
- Royal British Legion Band & Corps Of Drums Romford – English
- Central Band of the Royal British Legion - military
- West of Scotland Band Alliance

=== Russia ===
- Russian military bands
- Brass Band of the Government of Tuva

== Asia ==
=== Armenia ===
- Band of the General Staff of the Armed Forces of Armenia

=== Israel ===
- Israel Defense Forces Orchestra
- Israel Police Orchestra

=== Kazakhstan ===
- Presidential Orchestra of the State Security Service of the Republic of Kazakhstan
- Central Military Band of the Ministry of Defense of Kazakhstan
- Band of the National Guard of the Republic of Kazakhstan

=== Singapore ===
- Singapore Armed Forces Band
- Singapore Police Force Band
- Saint Joseph's Institution Military Band
- Singapore National Cadet Corps Command Band

== Australasia ==
=== Australia ===
- The Pipeband Club, Sydney
- Australian Army Band Corps – military
- The Lancer Band – military

=== New Zealand ===
- Wellington Brass Band

== See also ==
- Lists of musicians
- Marching bands
- March (music)
- Brass band
- Concert band
- Corps of Drums
- Drum and bugle corps
- Police band (music)

== Sources ==
- Marching.com
