= Pride Bands Alliance =

International music organisation

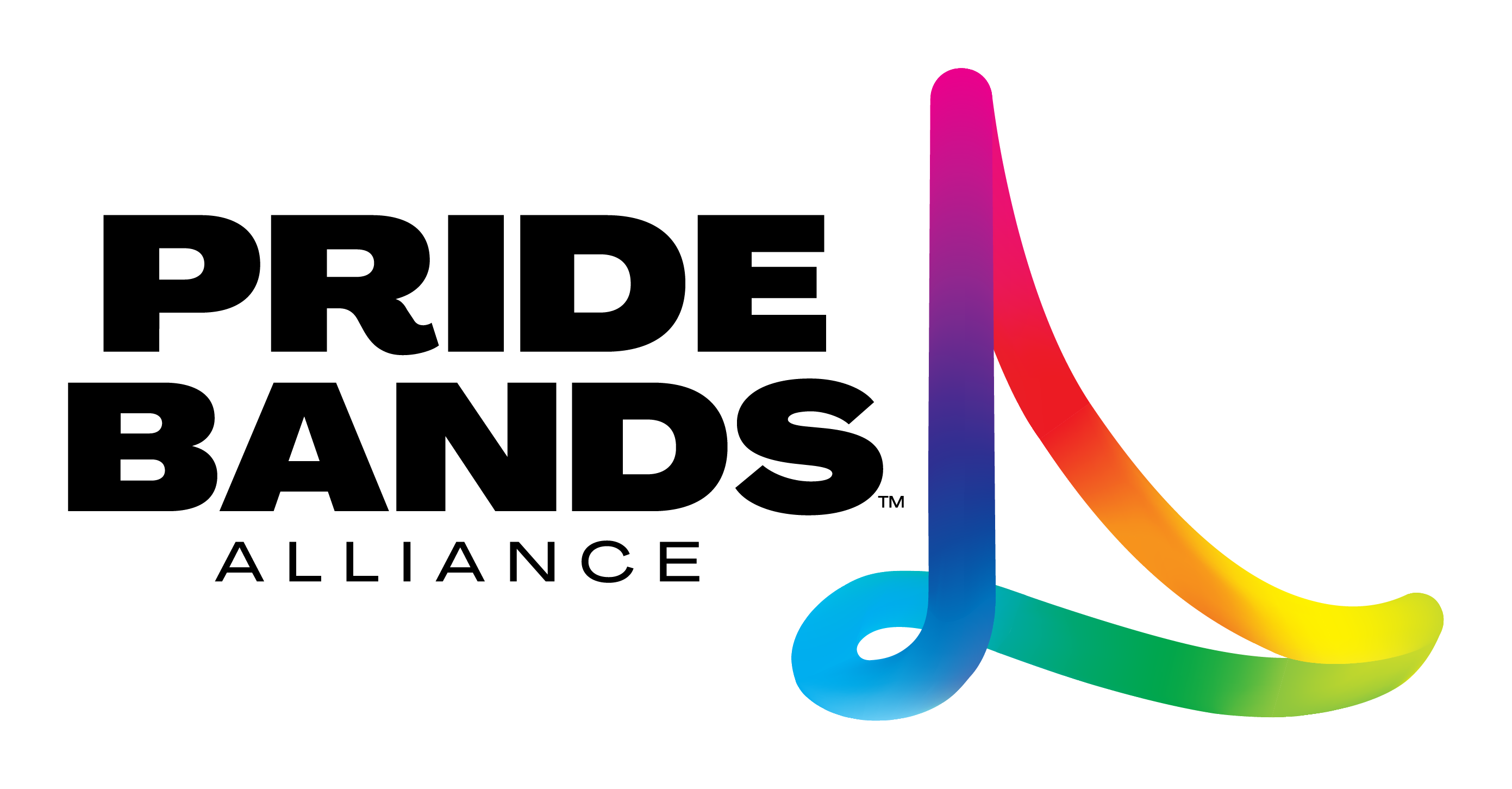
Current Pride Band Alliance logo

old LGBA logo

Pride Bands Alliance is an international network of LGBTQ+ and affirming community bands founded in 1982 as the Lesbian and Gay Bands of America. The organization supports local bands by providing a network for communication, hosting annual conferences, and providing the opportunity for members to perform in massed band performances in major events throughout the world.

Pride Bands Alliance currently includes 44 member & partner organizations in the United States, Canada, United Kingdom, and Australia.

== Current member & partner organizations ==
Member organizations

- Atlanta Freedom Band
- BandTogether (St. Louis, MO)
- Central Florida Sounds of Freedom and Colorguard (Orlando, FL)
- Charlotte Pride Band (Charlotte, NC)
- Cleveland Pride Band (Cleveland, OH)
- Columbus Pride Bands (Columbus, OH)
- D.C.’s Different Drummers (Washington, DC)
- Desert Overture (Phoenix, AZ)
- Encantada, The Band of Enchantment (Albuquerque, NM)
- Flower City Pride Band (Rochester, NY)
- Fort Wayne Pride Bands (Fort Wayne, IN)
- Freedom Trail Band of Boston (Boston, MA)
- Gay Freedom Band of Los Angeles (Los Angeles, CA)
- Gayly Forward (Toronto, Ontario CA)
- Houston Pride Band (Houston, TX)
- Iowa Pride Ensembles (Des Moines, IA)
- Lakeside Pride Music Ensembles (Chicago IL)
- Mid America Freedom Band (Kansas City, MO)
- Mile High Freedom Bands (Denver, CO)
- Minnesota Freedom Band (Minneapolis, MN)
- Nashville in Harmony Pride Band (Nashville, TN)
- Oak Lawn Band (Dallas, TX)
- Palm Springs Desert Winds (Palm Springs, CA)
- Philadelphia Freedom Band (Philadelphia, PA)
- Pride of Indy Bands, Inc. (Indianapolis, IN)
- Pride of San Antonio Showband (San Antonio, TX)
- Queen City Freedom Band (Cincinnati, OH)
- Rainbow City Performing Arts (Seattle, WA)
- Rocky Mountain Pride Bands (Denver, CO)
- Rose City Pride Bands (Portland OR)
- San Francisco Pride Band (San Francisco, CA)
- South Florida Pride Bands (Ft Lauderdale, FL)
- Tampa Bay Pride Band (Tampa, FL)
- The Queer Big Apple Corps (New York, NY)
- Triangle Pride Band (Raleigh, NC)

Partner organizations

- Bay Area Rainbow Symphony (San Francisco, CA)
- Challenge Brass Band (Perth, Western AU)
- CHEER San Francisco (San Francisco, CA)
- London Gay Symphonic Winds (London, UK)
- Melbourne Rainbow Band (Melbourne, AU)
- Pride Cheerleading Association (Salt Lake City, UT)
- Queer Urban Orchestra (New York, NY)
- Rainbow Concert Band (Vancouver, CA)
- Rutgers University Rainbow Symphony (New Brunswick, NJ)

== Origins ==
Pride Bands Alliance was originally formed as the Lesbian and Gay Bands of America when members of seven independent lesbian and gay bands met formally in Chicago from October 1–3, 1982.

Founding Bands

- San Francisco Lesbian/Gay Freedom Band (San Francisco, CA)
- Montrose Symphonic Band (Houston, TX)
- Los Angeles Great American Yankee (GAY) Freedom Band (Los Angeles, CA)
- New York Gay Community Marching Band (New York, NY)
- Chicago Gay/Lesbian Community Band (Chicago, IL)
- D.C.'s Different Drummers (Washington DC)
- Oak Lawn Symphonic Band (Dallas, TX)
- Minnesota Freedom Band (Minneapolis, MN)

== Conferences and special events ==
Pride Bands Alliance meets annually in a conference hosted by a member band. Conferences generally attract over 300 participants and include workshops, roundtable discussions, social events, and performance opportunities that can include massed band concerts, parades, jazz band, pep band, as well as smaller ensembles.

Conferences sometimes include special guest conductors and composers. Past Pride Bands Alliance annual conferences have included Alfred Reed, Frank Ticheli, Julie Giroux, Robert Longfield, Michael Markowski, Randall Standridge, Rossano Galante.

Conference concerts have also featured celebrity emcees/performers including Rita Moreno, Judith Light, Cindy Williams, Dick Sargent, Margaret Cho, Denali Foxx, and Angeria Paris VanMicheals.

== Massed band events ==
Pride Bands Alliance organizes massed band performances for musicians from member bands at major events throughout the world. Events have included:

- Rose Parade, Pasadena, CA 2027
- World Pride, New York City, USA 2019
- Gay Games X, Paris, France 2018
- Gay Games IX, Cleveland, USA 2014
- Barack Obama Presidential Inauguration, Washington, DC 2013
- World Pride, London, UK 2012
- Gay Games VIII, Cologne, Germany 2010
- Barack Obama Presidential Inauguration, Washington, DC 2009
- Gay Games VII, Chicago, USA 2006
- Gay Games VI, Sydney, Australia 2002
- Millennium March on Washington, Washington DC 2000
- Gay Games V, Amsterdam, Netherlands 1998
- Bill Clinton Presidential Inauguration, Washington DC 1997
- Gay Games IV, New York, USA 1994
- March on Washington, Washington DC 1993
- Bill Clinton Presidential Inauguration, Washington DC 1993
- March on Washington, Washington DC 1990
- Gay Games III, Vancouver, Canada 1990th
- Gay Games II, San Francisco, USA 1986
- Hollywood Bowl, Los Angeles, USA 1984
- Gay Games I, San Francisco, USA 1982
