= Jon Reed Sims =

American conductor (1947–1984)

- Born: May 6, 1947; Smith Center, Kansas
- Died: July 16, 1984 (aged 37); San Francisco, California
- Cause of death: Complications from AIDS
- Education: Wichita State University (B.A.); Indiana University Bloomington (M.F.A.)
- Occupations: Music educator; Choir conductor; Band director
- Organization: San Francisco Gay Freedom Day Marching Band and Twirling Corps

Jon Reed Sims (May 6, 1947 – July 16, 1984), was an American choir conductor born in Smith Center, Kansas. He founded several gay and lesbian musical groups, including the San Francisco Gay Freedom Day Marching Band and Twirling Corps, which was the first openly gay musical organization in the world, and the San Francisco Gay Men's Chorus. Sims died in 1984 from complications from AIDS.

== Early life and education ==
Sims was born on May 6, 1947 on a farm near Lebanon, Kansas. His family later moved to a farm closer to Smith Center. His father was a wheat farmer. From an early age, relatives noted Sims' musical talent and enthusiasm. He started taking piano lessons at the age of 6 and named his 4-H livestock after music composers. As a child, he was awarded the American Legion Award for outstanding Eighth Grade Boy, and he won first pace at the Kansas State Fair for his sugar cookies. He was a drum major at Smith Center High School, where he played the cornet, the tuba, and the French horn.

Sims attended Fort Hays State University, then transferred to Wichita State University, where he received a Bachelor of Music in French horn and B.A. in theory and composition in 1969. According to his sister, Judith Sims Billings, Sims was a "very flamboyant drum major" at both Universities. In 1972, he earned an Master of Music degree in horn from Indiana University.

== Early career ==
Sims taught at junior high school music in Chicago from 1972 to 1974. While in Chicago, he performed with the Chicago Civic Orchestra. Upon moving to San Francisco, he taught high school band at in Daly City between 1974 and 1978.

== LGBT performing arts ==
In June 1978, he founded the San Francisco Gay Freedom Day Marching Band and Twirling Corps (now the San Francisco Pride Band), which was the first lesbian and gay musical organization in the world. The band made its first public appearance later that month at the San Francisco Gay Freedom Day parade, marching behind Harvey Milk's convertible. In Summer 1979, Sims directed the band in the first of several annual Gay Musical Celebrations for Pride Month. Sims directed the band until January 1982.

Later in 1978, he founded the San Francisco Gay Men's Chorus, which was also the first openly gay American choral group. The Chorus made its unplanned debut a mere four weeks later, on November 27, 1978, when its members sang on the steps of the San Francisco City Hall at an impromptu memorial for Supervisor Harvey Milk and Mayor George Moscone, who had been assassinated earlier that day. Sims stayed on to appoint a new director for the SFGMC, Dick Kramer, who helped helm the formal inaugural performance of the 115-voice SFGMC and the Marching Band at Everett Middle School on December 20, 1978. In June 1981, the SFGMG went on a national concert tour spanning eight U.S. cities.

Sims founded Golden Gate Performing Arts, Inc., an organization that sought to unify a diverse number of musical groups under the same umbrella. Member groups included the San Francisco Lesbian and Gay Men's Community Chorus (later known as Lesbian/Gay Chorus of San Francisco, now known as the Queer Chorus of San Francisco) in 1980, Lambda Pro Musica orchestra (a now-defunct strings section), David Kelsey & Pure Trash, Varsity Drag, the FLAG Corps, the San Francisco Tap Troupe (1979), Published Wayne Fleisher (9-12-2016) and encouraged the formation of the Big Apple Corps GLBT band in New York by Nancy Corporon and The Great American Yankee Freedom Band of Los Angeles by Wayne Love.

Sims received the Keys to the City from then-Mayor of San Francisco Dianne Feinstein.

== Illness and death ==
Sims, who complained some two years earlier of exhaustion, was diagnosed with AIDS in January 1984. Six months later, he died of the little-known disease on July 16 at Garden Sullivan Hospital in San Francisco at the age of 37. He was one of the earliest casualties of AIDS in the United States; at the time of his death, around 200 men had died from the disease in San Francisco, and 2,000 nationwide.

He was memorialized by more than 1,500 people at a service at Grace Cathedral, where attendees wore rainbow armbands to honor him. An obituary written for Sims by a friend claimed that he offered "an alternative to the baths and the bars." Jon Reed Sims is buried at Fairview Cemetery at Smith Center, Kansas.

== Legacy ==
Sims was commemorated by San Francisco's Rainbow Honor Walk, with a plaque to be installed upon fundraising. In 2019, a piano belonging to Sims was donated to the National LGBTQ Center for the Arts. His French horn continues to be played by band members. In 2019, legislation was signed establishing the San Francisco Lesbian/Gay Freedom Band as San Francisco's official band, and the horn was symbolically placed on the desk where the mayor signed the law.

The Jon Sims Endowment Fund for the Performing Arts, established in 1989, grants funds to LGBTQ+ performing arts organizations in honor of Sims.
