= San Francisco Pride Band =

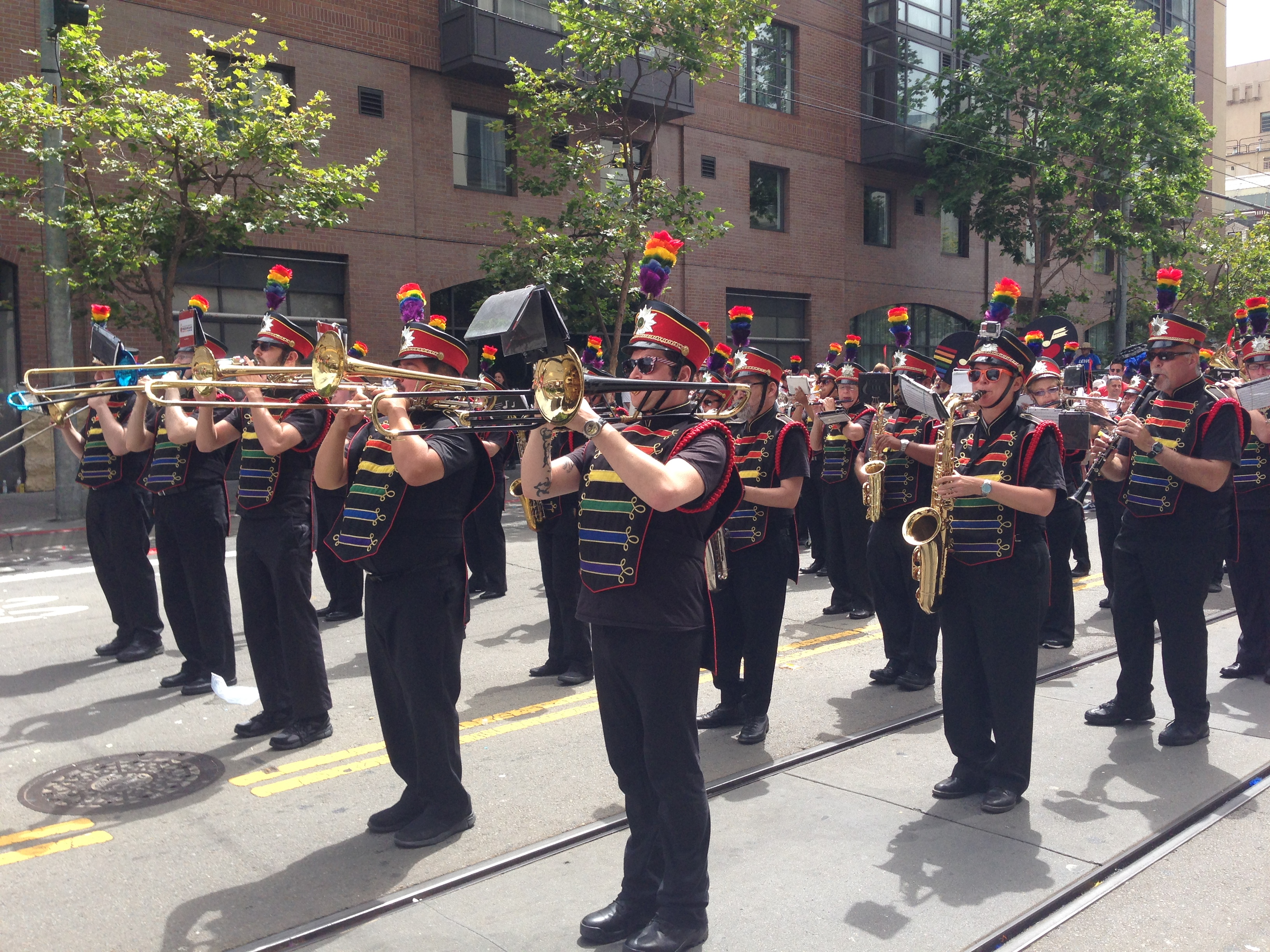

Background information
- Also known as: SF Pride Band; San Francisco Gay Freedom Day Marching Band; San Francisco Lesbian/Gay Freedom Band (SFLGFB)
- Origin: San Francisco, California, United States
- Genres: Concert Band, Marching Band, Pep Band
- Years active: 1978–present
- Website: sfprideband.org

The San Francisco Pride Band (formerly the San Francisco Lesbian/Gay Freedom Band or SFLGFB) is a community-based concert, marching, and pep band in San Francisco. It is the official band of San Francisco. Founded in 1978, it was the first openly gay musical organization in the world. The band promotes visibility and musical education for the Bay Area's lesbian, gay, bisexual, transgender, queer (plus) (LGBTQ+) communities. Although a majority of its members are LGBTQ+, many are heterosexual allies who join to support the LGBTQ+ community and to participate in the community concert band, marching band, or pep band. The band presents musical programs that help build understanding between LGBTQ+ and other communities.

== Mission ==
"The San Francisco Pride Band provides for the education and musical development of its members, promotes visibility of lesbian, gay, bisexual and transgender communities, and with its allies, fosters understanding among diverse communities through public performance."

== History ==
The band was founded by Jon Reed Sims in 1978 as the San Francisco Gay Freedom Day Marching Band and Twirling Corp. Sims, born in Smith Center, Kansas, was a musician and performer who formed the band in response to Anita Bryant's anti-gay campaign in the late 1970s. Upon its founding in 1978, it became the first openly gay musical group in the world. In successive years, Sims created the San Francisco Gay Men's Chorus, the Lesbian/Gay Chorus of San Francisco, Lambda Pro Musica orchestra (now defunct), and encouraged the formation of the Big Apple Corps GLBT band in New York by Nancy Corporon and The Great American Yankee Freedom Band of Los Angeles by Wayne Love.

Over the decades, the organization’s name appeared in several forms. Early programs and press references from the 1980s identify the ensemble as the San Francisco Gay Freedom Day Marching Band or, more broadly, the Gay Freedom Day Marching Band. By the 1990s and 2000s, the group was widely known as the San Francisco Lesbian/Gay Freedom Band (SFLGFB), a name that appeared consistently in news coverage and concert programs. These variations all refer to the same organization that later adopted the name San Francisco Pride Band in 2024.

The band's membership approved a change to the band's name in mid-2024 from "San Francisco Lesbian/Gay Freedom Band" to "San Francisco Pride Band" to be more inclusive.

== The Official Band of San Francisco ==
For its dedication to community service, the San Francisco Pride Band was first declared "The Official Band of San Francisco" on its 20th anniversary on behalf of the city's Board of Supervisors by Supervisor Tom Ammiano at Yerba Buena Gardens. The Board of Supervisors repeated the honor in May 2003 at the Band's 25th anniversary concert, The Beat Goes On, at Everett Middle School Auditorium, the site of the Band's first formal concert in December 1978.

On December 4, 2018, the San Francisco Board of Supervisors voted unanimously to pass legislation officially designating the San Francisco Pride Band "the official band of the City and County of San Francisco." In a ceremony at San Francisco City Hall on December 18, 2018, San Francisco mayor London Breed signed the measure into law.

== Membership ==
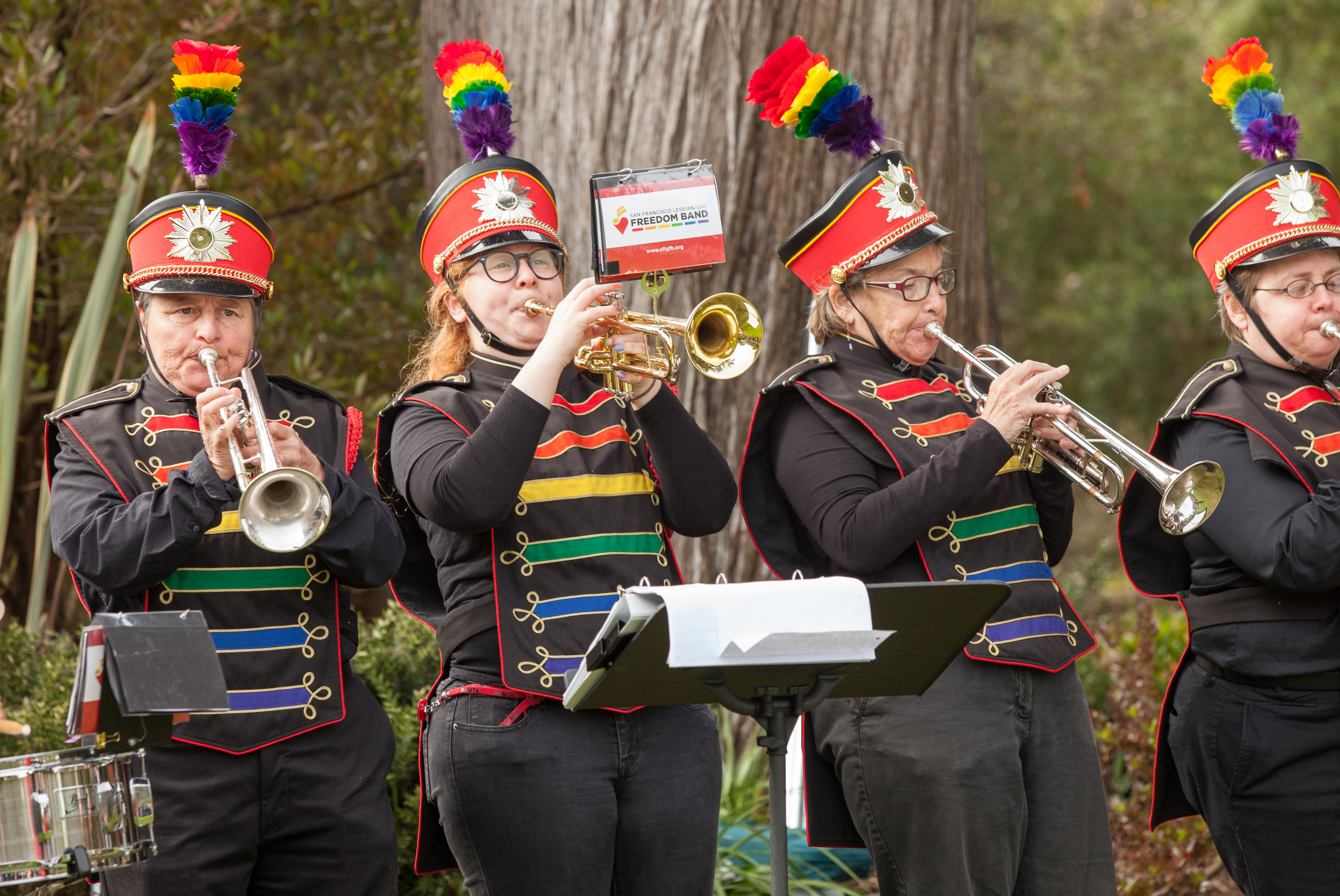
San Francisco Pride Band members in marching uniforms

As a community band, the San Francisco Pride Band has diverse members from all over the greater Bay Area. Members come from many walks of life, religious beliefs, genders, cultures, physical abilities and sexual orientations.

New musicians may join without an audition. They are required only to read sheet music and have at least high school-level skill playing a band instrument. (See list, below.) The band typically performs Grade 4 ("medium advanced") concert music.

== Leadership ==
Artistic Directors (Concert Band):

- Jon Sims, founder (1978–1982)
- Tom Smith (1982)
- Lesesne Van Antwerp (1982–1985)
- Jay Kast (1986–1988)
- Jeff Foote (1988–1989)
- Wayne Love (1988; 1989–1990)
- Nancy Corporon (1990–1996)
- Jadine Louie (1996–2006)
- Dr. Roberto-Juan Gonzalez (2007–2008)
- Jadine Louie (2009–2012)
- Pete Nowlen (2013–2025)
- Matthew Fell (2026–Present)

Artistic Directors (Marching and Pep Bands):

- Michael J. Wong (2016–Present)

== Performances ==
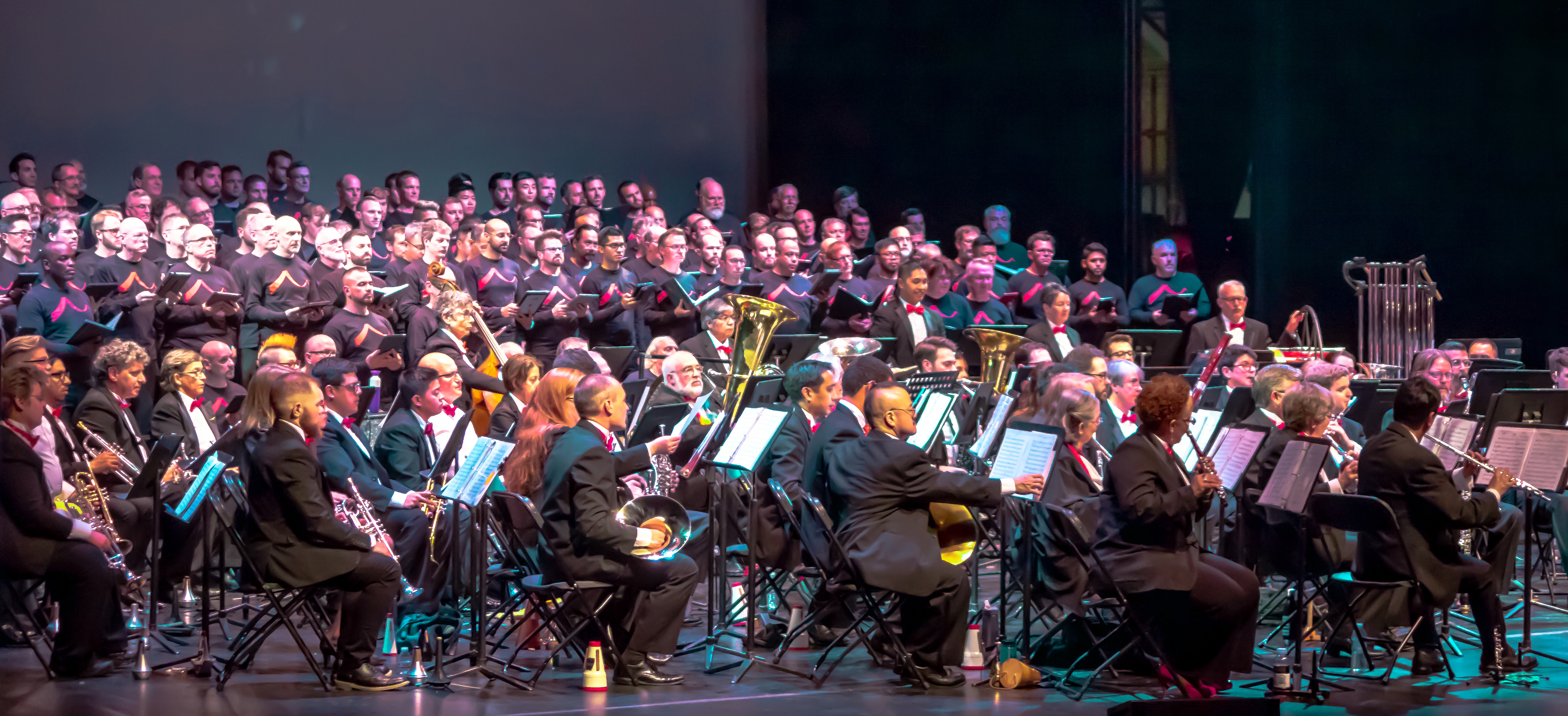
San Francisco Pride Band 2018 'Then & Now' 40th Anniversary Concert

The San Francisco Pride Band typically schedules four concerts annually in early March, June, September, and December. In addition, the marching band participates in many parades in the Bay Area, and the pep band performs at numerous community events throughout the year. Any nonprofit organization whose mission does not conflict with the band's can submit a request for the band to perform at its event. Among its recurring programs, the band’s longest-running production is the Dance-Along Nutcracker, first staged in 1985.

Since its inception, the band has performed at a variety of events, both LGBTQ+-oriented and not. Included in this list are the San Francisco Chinese New Year Parade, Senior's Connection on New Year's Day, LGBTQ+ pride parades across California and the United States, the San Francisco St. Patrick's Day Parade, the Redwood City 4th of July Parade, Clarendon Elementary School's Gay Awareness Day, SF AIDS Walk, and many more.

== Dance-Along Nutcracker^{®} ==
The Band's best known annual performance is the Dance-Along Nutcracker^{®}, usually held the first or second weekend in December at Yerba Buena Center for the Arts. Organized around a different whimsical theme each year, the show encourages the audience to dance during movements of Tchaikovsky's The Nutcracker Suite. Past show titles include "Nutcrackers in Space," "Clara Potter and the Elder Baton," and "Blazing Nutcrackers" (a Western themed show). In between "Dance-Along" numbers, the story unfolds complete with musical numbers, actors, dancers, costumes, sets, and props. These stories are written in the style of children's theatre and incorporate Nutcracker characters such as Clara, Fritz, Drosselmeyer, and even the rats! Up-to-date information on the show can be found at www.DanceAlongNutcracker.org.

Professional entertainers such as Carolyn Carvajal, Trauma Flintstone and the band's sister organization Cheer San Francisco have performed in past shows. Many audience members wear festive costumes they bring themselves or tutus they rent at the event. The Dance-Along Nutcracker is family-friendly and has been called "the plum of the holiday season." For many area residents, it has become an annual tradition. The production has been featured in the San Francisco Chronicle, Wall Street Journal and on NBC and HGTV.

== Organization ==
The San Francisco Pride Band is a California 501(c)3 nonprofit corporation governed by a set of bylaws with its policies and procedures enumerated in The Band Handbook. Day-to-day governance of the organization is the responsibility of an all-volunteer board of directors. Band members elect board members and the board then elects its officers (President, Vice President, Secretary, and Treasurer). Several directors have special responsibilities and titles such as "Director of Marketing," "Director of Membership," and "Director of Technology." The two artistic directors (one for the concert band and one for the pep/marching bands) are paid independent contractors.

== Affiliations ==
The San Francisco Pride Band is a charter member of the Pride Bands Alliance (formerly the Lesbian Gay Band Association or "LGBA"), an international group with over 35 member bands and partner organizations. Since its inception in 1982, Pride Bands Alliance (as LGBA) has facilitated the creation of numerous new local LGBT Bands, while also organizing many major "massed band" performances. These have included Gay Games, three Marches on Washington, two United States presidential inaugurations, and appearances in major venues including Hollywood Bowl, Madison Square Garden, the Alamo, DAR Constitution Hall, Jordan Hall (Boston), Jones Hall (Houston), Davies Symphony Hall (San Francisco), and the Pritzker Pavilion in Millennium Park during the 2006 Gay Games VII held in Chicago.

The San Francisco Pride Band is also an organizational member of the Association of Concert Bands (ACB).

== See also ==
- Freedom Band of Los Angeles
- Queer Big Apple Corps
- Pride Bands Alliance
- Pride of Indy Band and Color Guard
- Dance-Along Nutcracker
