= Mid America Freedom Band =

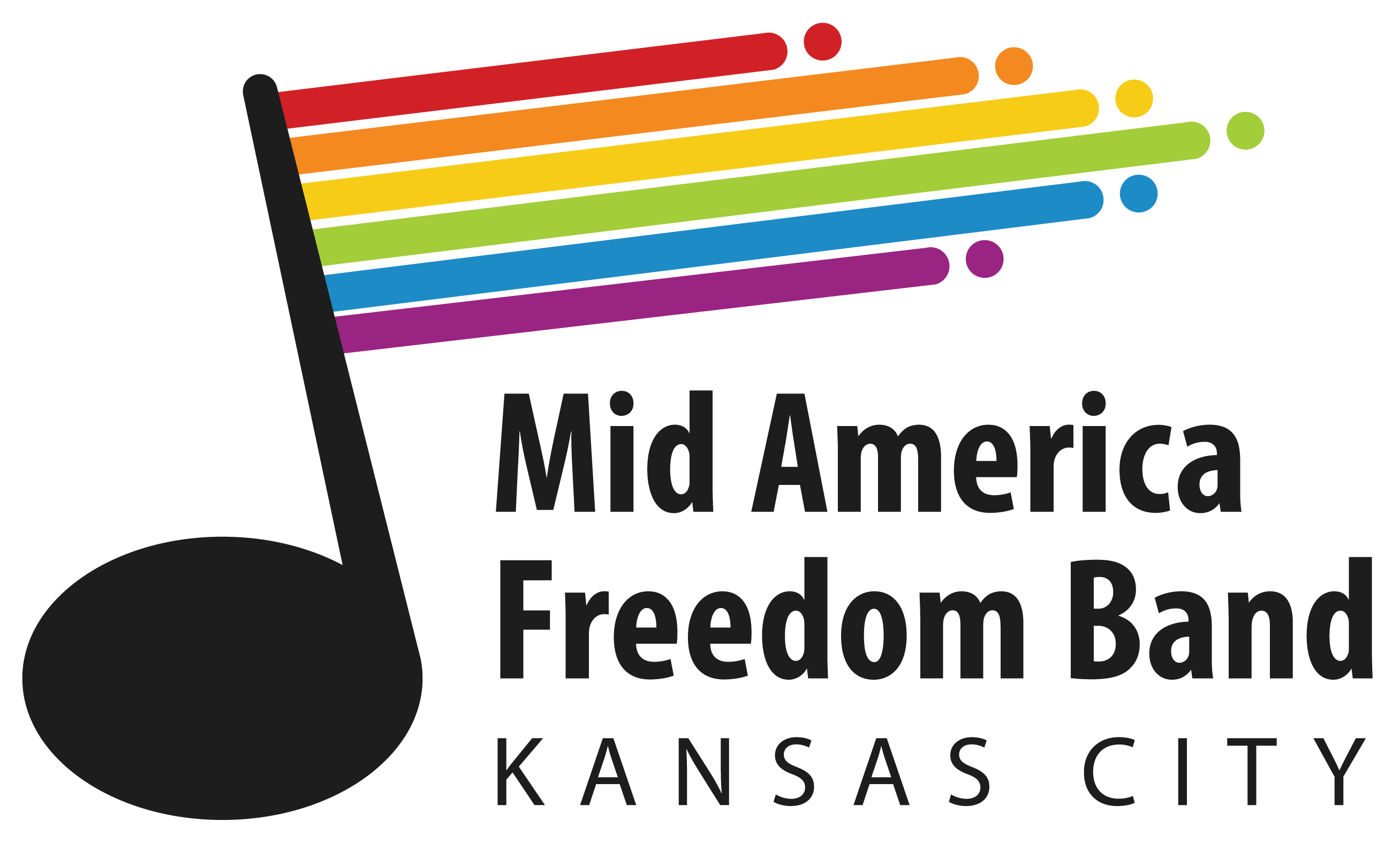

Background information
- Origin: Kansas City, Missouri, U.S.
- Genres: Concert band

The Mid America Freedom Band (MAFB) is a volunteer community concert band based in Kansas City, Missouri, serving LGBTQ+ and allied musicians. The organization provides inclusive performance opportunities and community engagement through multiple ensembles, including a concert band, a jazz ensemble, and a pep band.

Founded in 2002, the ensemble is part of the Pride Bands Alliance and has been recognized in regional media for its performances and role in the local arts community.

== History ==
The Mid America Freedom Band (MAFB) was conceived in 2001 by founders Alan Day and Zachary Parker as a community ensemble for LGBTQ+ and allied musicians in the Kansas City metropolitan area. The organization held its first rehearsal on April 18, 2002, at the Lesbian and Gay Community Center in Kansas City, Missouri, with four musicians in attendance.

The band's first public performance, titled Journeys, took place on November 15, 2003, with an ensemble of 13 musicians. In its early years, the group focused on establishing a consistent rehearsal schedule and building membership within the local community.

MAFB formally incorporated as a nonprofit organization in 2004. A board of directors was established in 2005 to support governance, fundraising, and long-term organizational development. As membership increased, the band expanded its programming to include multiple seasonal concerts and community performances throughout the Kansas City area.

Over time, the organization grew from a small founding group into a larger performing arts organization with more than 80 active members. In addition to its primary concert band, MAFB developed additional ensembles to support a wider range of performance opportunities, including jazz and pep band groups.

By the 2020s, the Mid America Freedom Band had established itself as a regular presence in Kansas City's performing arts and LGBTQ+ community spaces, presenting annual concert seasons and participating in local events and festivals.

The Mid America Freedom Band (MAFB) hosted the Pride Bands Alliance (formerly the Lesbian and Gay Band Association) 2018 Conference in Kansas City, Missouri, from May 23–27, 2018. The event, titled "There’s No Place Like Home," brought several hundred LGBTQ and allied musicians to the city for performances and programming.

== Ensembles ==
The Mid America Freedom Band operates multiple performing ensembles:

Mid America Freedom Band – A full wind ensemble that performs a regular concert season from August through May.

Mighty Mo Jazz Orchestra – A jazz ensemble performing a range of styles including swing, Latin, and contemporary jazz.

Spirit Pep Band and Color Guard – A marching and pep ensemble performing at community events such as pride festivals and parades.

== Activities ==
The band presents regular concert performances in the Kansas City area and participates in civic and cultural events. It has appeared in local events such as the Kansas City Pride parade and other public performances.

Coverage has also noted the band's role in commissioning and performing new works and in contributing to the regional arts environment.

In 2021, the Mid America Freedom Band was named a semi-finalist for The American Prize in Band/Wind Ensemble Performance in the community division, a national nonprofit competition recognizing outstanding recorded performances by ensembles across the United States. According to the organization, it was the first ensemble affiliated with the Pride Bands Alliance to receive this recognition.

== See also ==
- Pride Bands Alliance
