= The Chesterfield Musketeers Showband =

UK marching band and carnival band

- Location: Chesterfield, Eastwood and Derby England, United Kingdom.
- Founded: 1953 (Newbold Toppers)
- Director: Kevin Oldfield
- Members: 28

The Chesterfield Musketeers Showband are a marching band and carnival band based in Chesterfield and Derby in Derbyshire, England. They are a registered charity (Registered Charity Number 1122519). They play an upbeat and popular style of music and wear a French Musketeer style of uniform. They practice, weekly at Alvaston Park/Derby Arena in Derby (Wednesdays and Sundays) and Stand Road Park Chesterfield, Derbyshire. They Entertain all over the UK and Europe performing Figure Routines and Dances during Parades and Arena 15-minute Arena Displays at Carnivals, Fetes, Galas and Promotions, helping Councils, Organisations and Charities raise funds.

== History ==
Originally formed in 1953 as the Newbold Toppers they evolved several times with different styles of uniforms and music but after 27 years the whole structure was changed. The new name and uniform was based on the traditional tale of The Three Musketeers by Alexandre Dumas. The original uniform was designed in partnership with Chesterfield College. 1993 saw the uniform change to the one on show today, with a similar design based on the 1993 film The Three Musketeers. Former members of Carnival Band Secretaries League (1953–1993), they were first crowned League Champions back in 1958 and the success continued with them winning over 250 major Awards over the next six decades. Following the big change in 1981 from the Chesterfield Toppers Theme to The Musketeer Theme, they won their first, "First Prize" within the first month of competing. In August 1981 they won the FG Ward Memorial Trophy at Mareaton Park in Derby. Over the 62 years the Band have won every major competition available to carnival show bands, including the Spanish Classic Championships, All England Champions, C.B.S.L. League Champions, UK Champions, Midland Counties Champions and The Isle of Man World Championships a record three times.

== Achievements ==
- 1953 – Formed after a meeting at The Steelmelters Pub in the West End of Chesterfield
- 1958 – Crowned C.B.S.L. League Champions as the Newbold Toppers
- 1963 – Founded The Annual Chesterfield Carnival
- 1974 – Crowned C.B.S.L. League Champions as the Chesterfield Toppers
- 1979 – Commended by the President of the English Clubs in Landkries Darmstadt Germany.
- 1980 – Commended for Community twinning work in Troyes France by the Champagne District MEP.
- 1983 – Commended at the Alsbach a.d.B – Festival – ausschuft West Germany.
- 1984 – Recommended by the Speaker of the House of Keyes IOM Sir Charles Kerruish as Honorary Manxman for part in successful 30th Commonwealth Conference Pageantry – Rushen Castle Castletown IOM.
- 1984 – Crowned I.O.M. World Champions (Youth Band)
- 1984 – Chesterfield Borough Council Civic Reception Town Hall – Services to representing Chesterfield.
- 1985 – Crowned I.O.M. World Champions (Showband)
- 1991 – Crowned I.O.M. World Champions (Carnival Band)
- 1992 – Crowned Sunrider Spanish Classic Champions in Salou
- 1992 – Derbyshire County Council Civic Reception County Hall Matlock Service to representing Derbyshire overseas – Spain.
- 1994 – Crowned Sunrider Spanish Classic Champions in Pineda
- 2006 – First Performance in "The Jersey Battle of Flowers" in St Helier Jersey
- 2008 – Official registered Charity – Registered Charity Number 1122519
- 2013 – Celebrated their 60th Year
- 2013 – First Performance in Scotland at Bathgate
- 2014 – Performance in Disneyland Paris France
- Featured in And The Band Played On: The Life and Times of a Carnival Band. Relating the full history of the organisation from 1953 to 1982
- Featured in All for One and One for All. 1981–2006 the 25th Anniversary of the Musketeers
- Represented, Chesterfield, Derbyshire & England in International Competitions in the Isle of Man (seven times), Germany (four times), France (twice) and Spain (three times) and Northern Ireland.
- Many appearances on local, national and international television, including special features on The Battle of Flowers and Northern Ireland's Milk Festival.
- Titles Won include; All England Champions, UK Champions, Midland Counties Champions, South East Midlands Counties Champions, Amber Valley Champions, Spanish Classic Champions and World Champions three times.

== Appearances ==
- Seeheim – Germany (x4)
- Darmstadt – Germany (x4)
- Heidelberg – Germany
- Troyes – France (x2)
- Paris – France
- Disneyland Paris – France
- Salou – Spain
- Callela – Spain
- Pineda – Spain
- Coleraine – Northern Ireland
- Douglas – Isle of Man (8 Times)
- Bathgate – Scotland
- Cardiff – Wales
- 30th Commonwealth Conference Pageantry – Rushen Castle Castletown IOM
- Jersey Battle of Flowers – Battle Parade & Moonlight Parade – St Helier Jersey – Battle of Flowers Jersey (x10)
- Silverstone Race Track
- St Patrick Day's Parade – London
- St Patrick Day's Parade – Nottingham
- Lord Mayors Parade – London
- Lord Mayors Parade – Sheffield (x3)
- Lord Mayors Parade – Birmingham
- Lord Mayors Parade – Coventry
St Patrick's Day Parade London 2009

The Chesterfield Musketeers Showband

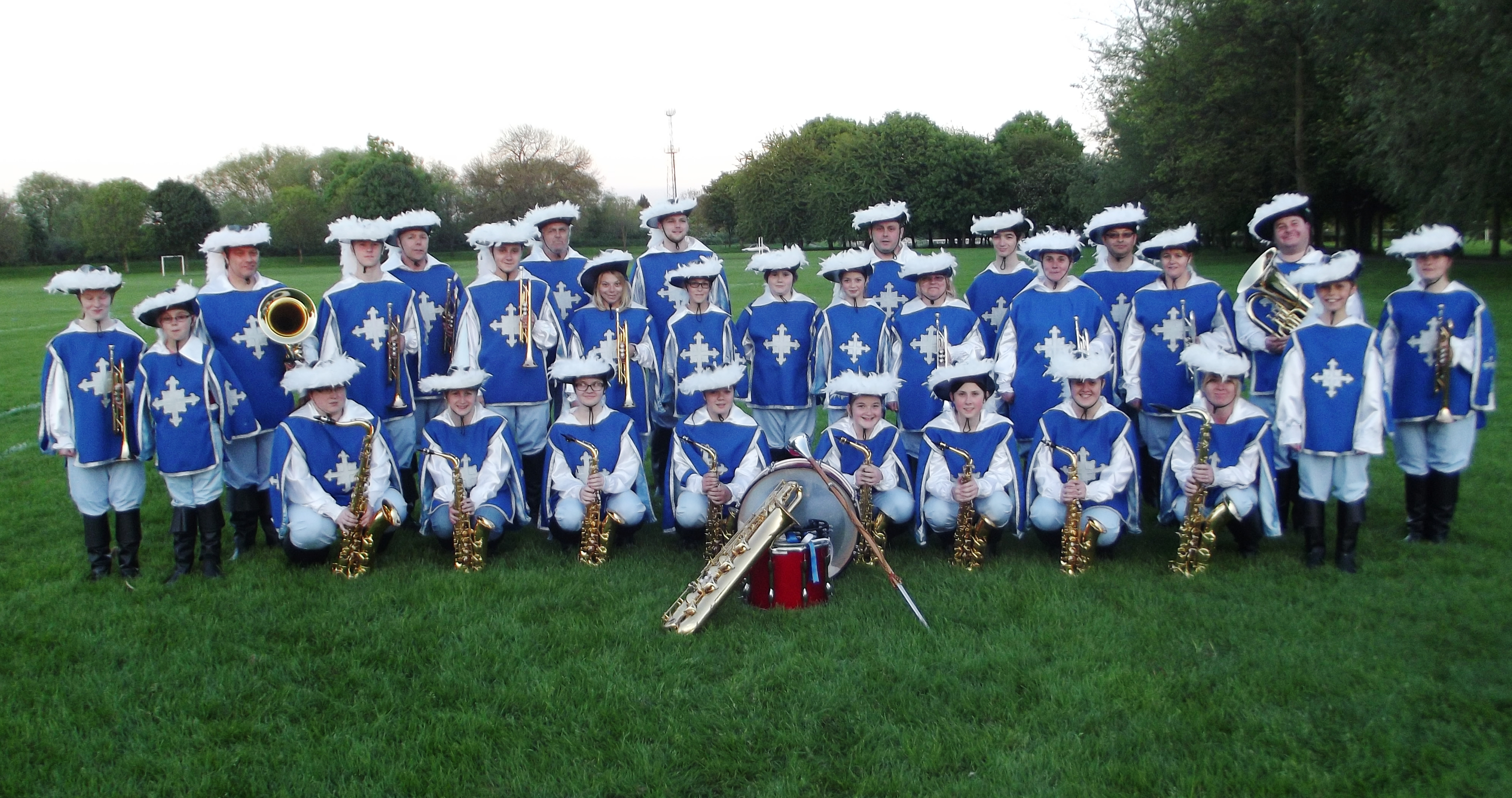
The Chesterfield Musketeers Showband 2014
