= Queer Chorus of San Francisco =

- Also known as: QCSF
- Origin: San Francisco, California, United States
- Genres: Broadway, choral, classical, jazz, popular
- Occupation: Choir
- Instrument: ca. 35 voices
- Years active: 1980-present
- Members: Artistic and Music Director; Michael Kerschner
- Website: qcsf.org

The Queer Chorus of San Francisco (QCSF) was founded in 1980 by Jon Reed Sims (1947–1984). Initially known as the San Francisco Lesbian and Gay Men’s Community Chorus, it was the world's first choral organization to use both "lesbian" and "gay" in its name, Within a few years, the chorus changed its name to Lesbian/Gay Chorus of San Francisco (LGCSF). In March 2022, by a vote of its membership, the group changed its name to "The Queer Chorus of San Francisco".

The Queer Chorus of San Francisco is dedicated to building and enriching its communities through the universal language of music.

== Selected concerts ==
- BrokeBACH Mountain, November 18 and 19, 2011, Mission Cultural Center for Latino Arts, San Francisco, CA
- A Shameless Show of Holiday Shite, December 18 and 19, 2011, Martuni's Piano Bar, San Francisco, CA
- Love Bites, and so did the 80s, February 10, 11, and 12, 2012, Missional Cultural Center for Latino Arts, San Francisco, CA
- World Premiere: Harvey Milk: A Cantata, text by Harvey Milk, music composed by Jack Curtis Dubowsky, April 27, 2012, Lick-Wilmerding High School, San Francisco, CA
- 34th Annual Pride Concert: Harvey Milk: A Cantata, June 22, 2012, San Francisco Conservatory of Music, San Francisco, CA
- 35th Annual Pride Concert: Ripped From The Headlines! Music Celebrating LGBT Stories, June 22, 2013, San Francisco Conservatory of Music, San Francisco, CA
- We Celebrate!, November 16, 2013, First Unitarian Church, San Francisco, CA
- Swing Break, April 11 and 12, 2014, Mission Cultural Center for Latino Arts, San Francisco, CA

== Music directors ==
- Robin Kay (1980)
- Pat Parr
- Trent Morant
- Michael Carlson
- Jerry R. Foust
- Stephanie Lynne Smith (2002–2010)
- William "Billy" Sauerland (2011–2017)
- Michael Reilly (2017–present)

== Awards ==
- Best Concert, Cable Car Awards (multiple recipient)
- Bob Cramer Award for Excellence, Cable Car Awards, 1992
- Arts Excellence Award, San Francisco Chamber of Commerce, 1994

== Recordings ==
- Together in Harmony (1994)
- Wish You Were Here (2000)
- 25th Anniversary (2005)
- Group Therapy (2005)

== Affiliations ==
- Gay and Lesbian Association of Choruses (GALA Choruses)

== See also ==
- San Francisco Gay Men's Chorus
