= Windsor Police Pipe Band =

Canadian pipe band organization

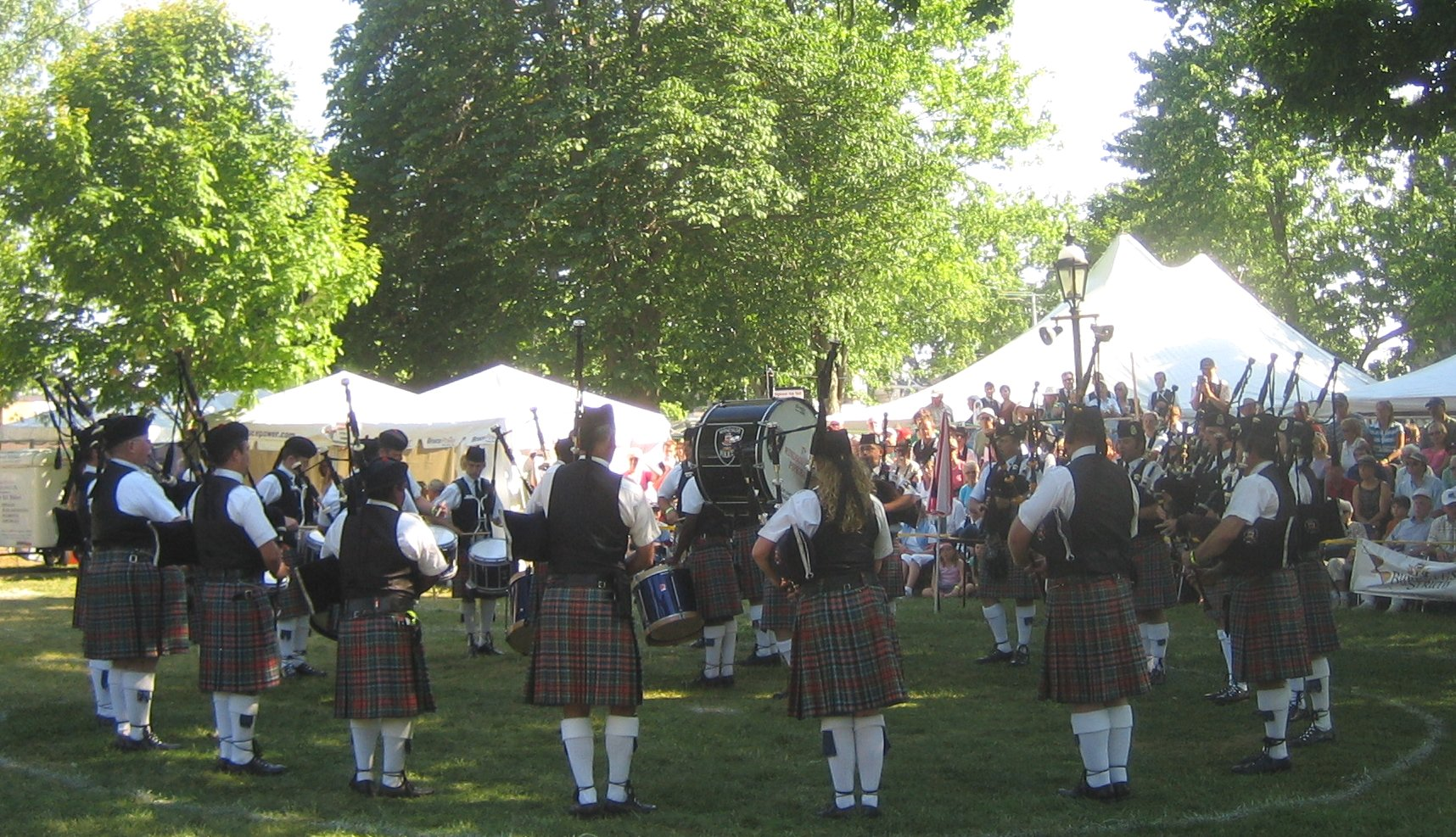
- Established: 1967
- Location: Windsor, Ontario
- Grade: 3, 5
- Pipe major: Malcolm MacLean
- Drum sergeant: Stuart Tait
- Tartan: Red Gordon
- Notable honours: 1st Place American Championships: 2006, 2011, 2012, 2013 (Grade 3), 1st Place North American Championships: 2006 (Grade 5)
- Website: windsorpolicepipeband.com

The Windsor Police Pipe Band is a Canadian pipe band organization based in Windsor, Ontario, Canada. The organization currently has two competing bands; one in grade 3 and another in grade 5.

== History ==
Founded in 1967, the band has grown substantially over the decades. At one point, the organization consisted of 4 complete bands competing in various grades in Ontario and at the World Pipe Band Championships, however, that number has since dwindled down after the successive departure of 3 pipe majors in their grade 2 band (later promoted to grade 1) within a 6-year period and its subsequent folding.

== Pipe Majors ==
- Alan Clark (2000–2001)
- Barry Ewen (2002–2003)
- Bill Baird (2005–2007)
- James Stewart (2004, 2008)

== Leading Drummers ==
- Dave Hickling (???–2001)
- Greg Dinsdale (2002–2004)
- Michael Crawley (2005–2008)

== Activities ==
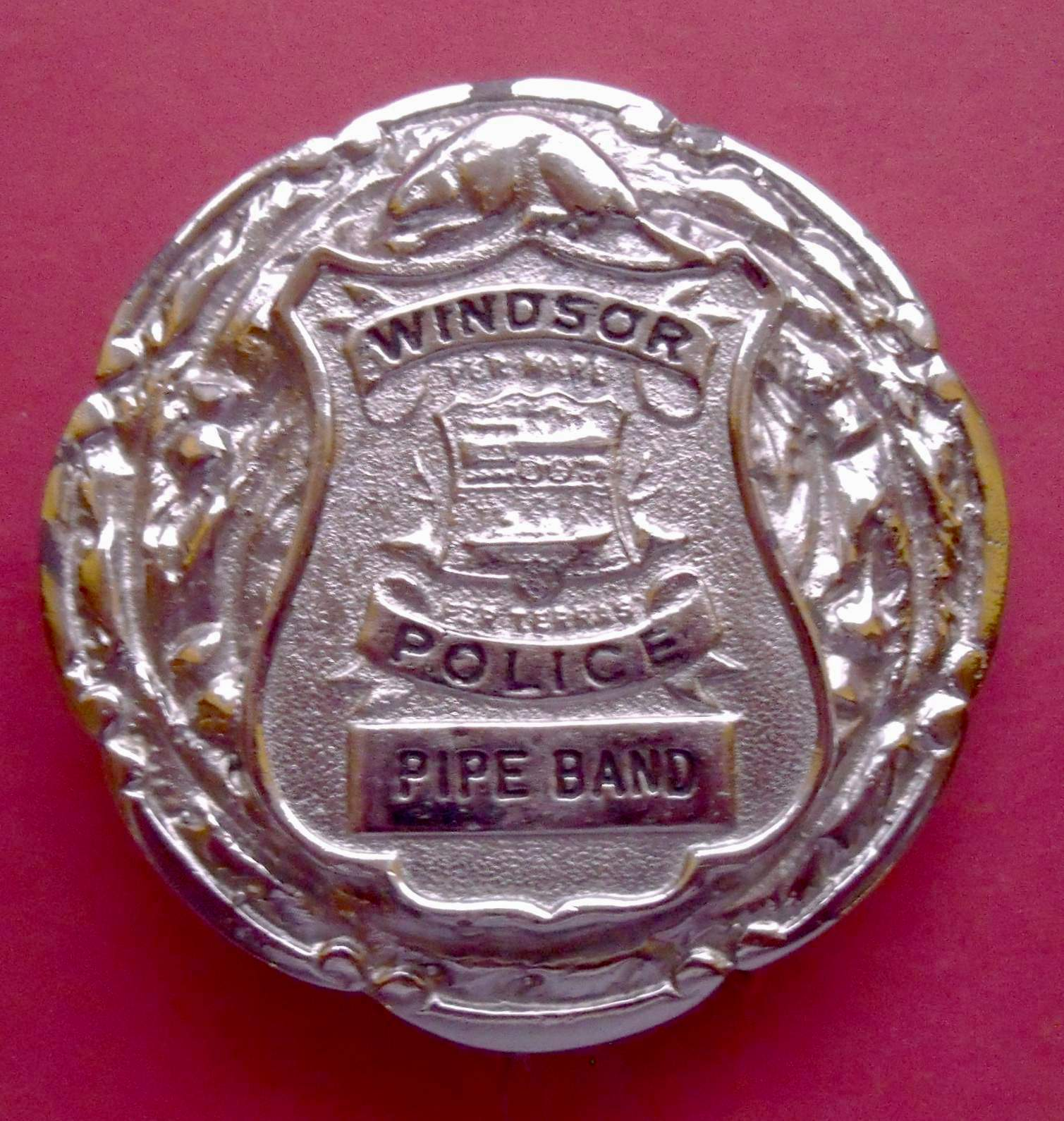
Official badge

The band performs at various events and contests throughout the year in Canada and the Eastern United States, including competitions, ceremonies, parades and memorial services.

As a community service, piping and drumming lessons are offered free of charge.

== Awards and honours ==
- 1st Place American Championships: 2006, 2011, 2012, 2013 (Grade 3)
- 1st Place North American Championships: 2006 (Grade 5)
