= Romford Drum & Trumpet Corps =

British youth marching band

The Romford Drum and Trumpet Corps
- Abbreviation: RDTC
- Formation: October 1957
- Location: Romford, Essex, UK
- Website: www.rdtc.org

The Romford Drum & Trumpet Corps is a youth band in a military band style, based in the London Borough of Havering. As one of the oldest independent youth marching bands in the country, it has a proud history, with performances throughout the UK, Europe and the USA. Its uniforms, instrumentation and style is closely based upon that of the Armed Forces British Military Bands. The band has performed at prestigious venues such as the Royal Albert Hall, Royal Festival Hall, Wembley Stadium, St Paul's Cathedral, Horseguards Parade and The London Palladium. It has also had the honour of performing in the presence of every member of the British royal family.

As a registered charity, the band has for nearly fifty years provided the young people of Romford with a rewarding activity. Despite the band receiving no funding, as an organisation, it manages to give a good foundation to youngsters and has continued the ethos of its founder where membership to the band is free of charge.

== History ==
Romford Drum and Trumpet Corps was founded on 11 October 1957 by Richard Bouchard along with twelve boys, a few battered instruments and a loan of £100. They adopted a traditional military style, which they maintain today. The striking green military uniform is strongly influenced by a close association with the Royal Green Jackets during the seventies.

The early days were spent marching through Romford on Sunday mornings and supporting local charities at fetes and garden parties. They quickly progressed and an appearance at the Soldier's Sailor's and Airman's Family Tattoo at White City led to engagements throughout the home counties. Such was the Bands popularity there was soon a waiting list to join. After successful performances in Jersey, the isle of Wight, the Isle of Man and Spalding Flower Festival were invited on several trips to France where they quickly became personalities. Civic Receptions, television and press coverage were arranged, the Corps were now an international institution.

Further television appearances with Leslie Crowther, Jimmy Tarbuck, Frank Ifield, Reg Varney and Tony Blackburn, guests of Charlie Drake on 'Sunday Night at the London Palladium', Billy Smart and Chipperfield's Circus spread their reputation nationwide.

The band then enlisted girls. A popular decision for band members and spectators, which has led to many romances within the Corps, some resulting in inter-band marriages. In fact the Corps now boast a second generation of the Romford Drum and Trumpet Corps, having the children of ex-members in the ranks!

The Corps visited Belgium and Germany and formed friendships with European bands which they still maintain. In 1974 the Corps performed at a music festival in Ostend, and were introduced to Jurgen Kuhlmann of the Billstedt Band who invited them to enter a contest in Busum, Germany. The band needed somewhere to stay and a small village opened their doors to welcome the band, the long association with Lunden had begun. Almost every band member since has at one time or another met with the people of Lunden, either during the band's holidays in Germany or when they visit Romford. In 1987 their bandmaster and one time Drum Major, Ronald Petersen was made an Honorary Vice-President of the Corps. In 2002 the Corps visited Lunden, Germany to compete in the North German Championships, then welcomed Ronald Petersen and the Verein Lundener Spiellute back to Romford for a holiday. So close is our association that in October 2002 Ronald brought a group of band members to Romford to surprise Dick Bouchard at the Corps 45th Reunion.

An honour for the Corps was to be adopted by the Romford Branch of the Burma Star Association, through this they were invited to play on Horseguards Parade in the presence of Lord Louis Mountbatten who paid his respects by inspecting the band. The relationship with the Burma Star Veterans flourished and in 1995 they performed at the 50th and final reunion at the Royal Albert Hall with Dame Vera Lynn and our war veterans in the presence of the Duke of Edinburgh.

The band has performed in the presence of the entire Royal family.

The National Youth Marching Band Championships were held for twenty-five years. The contest started at a small school in Enfield but by the second year moved to Alexander Palace and a win for the Romford Drum and Trumpet Corps! After the fire, which destroyed the Great Hall the contest moved once again to the Royal Albert Hall and Romford succeeded in becoming the National Champions for 1987-88-89.

In recent years the Corps have appeared on television many times including the Children's Royal Variety Show at the London Palladium, on the Big Noise with their own version of the Shoop Shoop Song, had the frightening experience of playing on top of one of the largest cranes in London for the Six O'clock Show, the Disney Club, the Big Breakfast and made a promotional video for Sky Sports.

The band have played for the Royal Welsh Fusiliers and the Russian Convoy Veterans at the Cenotaph, for the Merchant Navy Veterans at Tower Hill and taken part in the VE Day celebrations in Hyde Park and the VJ Day Parade past Buckingham Palace. They also performed at Earls Court to celebrate the Queen's 40th year of accession to the throne.

For the past five years they have played in the Gun Park at the Tower of London to entertain the runners in the London Marathon and have been regular participants in the Lord Mayor's Show for many years.

In recent years the band have formed friendships with the Royal Electrical & Mechanical Engineers Band, whose bandmaster, Clinton Bray, composed our march "Green and Gold" dedicated to Dick Bouchard, and the Minden Band of the Queens Division. The Corps have had workshops and performed in concert with both bands.

In March 2003 the Corps performed in the Market Place for HM The Queen when she visited Romford.

In 2006 the Corps again performed for HM The Queen in her own back garden, when they were given the honour of playing at the children's party at the palace.

== Successes ==
On the competition field the Romford Drum & Trumpet Corps has an impressive record of success. It has won the National Championships on seven occasions, including a hat-trick from 1987 to 1989. In November 2003 the band achieved the "Double" as the current National Champions and National Class League Winners.

In 2004 the band remained undefeated and retained the National Title and League for the second time.

2007 European Marching, Concert and Show band Championships, 4 times European Gold Medal Winners.

== Discography ==
=== Green and Gold ===
Green and Gold is the band's first recorded CD. It was recorded in 2007 for RDTC's 50th birthday and includes the sounds that the band has provided for fifty years.

==== Track listing ====
1. Blaze Away
2. Jerico
3. You Raise Me Up
4. Where No Man Has Gone Before
5. Adagio from Concierto de Aranjuez mon Amore
6. Slaidburn
7. Ejala
8. Big Noise from Winnetka
9. Bullseye
10. For the Love of a Princess
11. The Billboard March
12. An Irish Blessing
13. Latin Quarter
14. Pirates of the Caribbean
15. Green & Gold
16. Highbury Highs (Bonus Track recorded with Roger Daltrey)

The CD contains a rare recording of the Romford Drum and Trumpet Corps playing with Roger Daltrey of The Who on his Arsenal stadium tribute song "Highbury Highs"
