= Red Deer Royals =

Concert and matching band in Red Deer, Alberta, Canada

- Location: Red Deer, Alberta
- Founded: 1969
- Operated by: Red Deer Community Band Society
- Years active: 1969–present
- Director: Calista Lonsdale-Pangle
- Website: reddeerroyals.com

The Red Deer Royals are a concert and marching band based in the City of Red Deer, Alberta, Canada. Composed of members age 12 to 21, they are Central Alberta's World Class Marching Show Band. The Royals have been performing for over 50 years and are currently under the direction of Calista Lonsdale-Pangle.

== Members ==
The Band draws from Central Alberta's most ambitious young musicians to come together annually to create this community based marching showband. The Royals have members aged as young as 11 all the way up to 21 and they currently represent 20 School Band programs from the Central Alberta region. The Red Deer Royals perform all across Central Alberta throughout their summer season. Members are welcome to join under any of the Royals’ five branches; woodwinds, brass, front ensemble, drumline, and colourguard.

== Concert season ==
From September to April, the Red Deer Royals perform as a concert band, performing at many different venues. They play for Remembrance Day ceremonies, Christmas festivals, and various events around Red Deer. During the concert season, the band is conducted by Calista Lonsdale-Pangle. Each year there is a concert master and assistant concert master selected to conduct the band for a piece of their choice.

== Marching season ==
Starting in May, the Red Deer Royals perform in parades throughout Central Alberta. The band plays a rotation of popular music arranged for marching band, with the lineup varying year to year. Larger scale parades, such as the Calgary Stampede Parade, are adjudicated and the Royals' parade tunes are judged in competition. The Red Deer Royals also perform a unique field show each season alongside other showbands in the area.

Marching season is conducted by the band's current drum major(s), while Vanessa Pastor resides as the organization's visual director and marching instructor.

== Recent awards ==
At the 2008 Calgary Stampede Parade, the Red Deer Royals won the following awards: Best Canadian Band, Best Senior Band, and Best Overall Band, as well as third place for Best Auxiliary.

At the 2008 and the 2009 Edmonton Capital Ex Parade, the Royals were judged as the best marching band and were also the musical Grand Champions, winning the Sig Hansen Musical Award.

In 2014, the Red Deer Royals received second place in Italy for their show: Search For Paradise Reef, while an Italian marching band took first.

In 2019, the Royals were named the Ambassadors of Red Deer by Mayor Tara Veer.

== Directors ==
Throughout the band's history there have been seven band directors:

- 2023–present Calista Lonsdale-Pangle
- 2012–2023 Michael Mann
- 2001–2012 Rob Goring
- 1991–2001 Keith Mann: Keith Mann was honored for his work in the community and for the Royals in 2004 with a statue located in Red Deer City Hall Park and the Red Deer Royals performed at the unveiling his favorite piece, "Unchained Melody".
- 1977–1991 A.L. Jigger Lee
- 1973–1977 Frank Connell
- 1971–1973 Richard Campion
- 1969–1971 Vic Wright

== International tours ==
Every 2-3 years, the Royals tour internationally to compete as well as showcase their season's field show and parade lineup.

- 1998 England and France (WAMSB Championships London)
- 2001 Netherlands and Germany (WMC Kerkrade, WAMSB Championships Potsdam)
- 2003 Italy (WAMSB Championships Monza)
- 2006 Australia
- 2009 Netherlands, Ireland and Germany (Joint WMC/WAMSB Championships Kerkrade)
- 2011 Malaysia, Kuala Lumpur (WAMSB Championships)
- 2014 Italy
- 2017 Europe, Germany, Netherlands WMC
- 2019 England and Ireland (Celtic Band Festival)
- 2023 Nova Scotia and Prince Edward Island
