= Queer Big Apple Corps =

US musical group

The Queer Big Apple Corps (QBAC), formerly the Lesbian and Gay Big Apple Corps (LGBAC) is a community band based in New York City. Founded in 1979 as the New York Gay Community Marching Band, QBAC is the third-oldest community band in the United States dedicated to serving the LGBT community.

== Mission ==
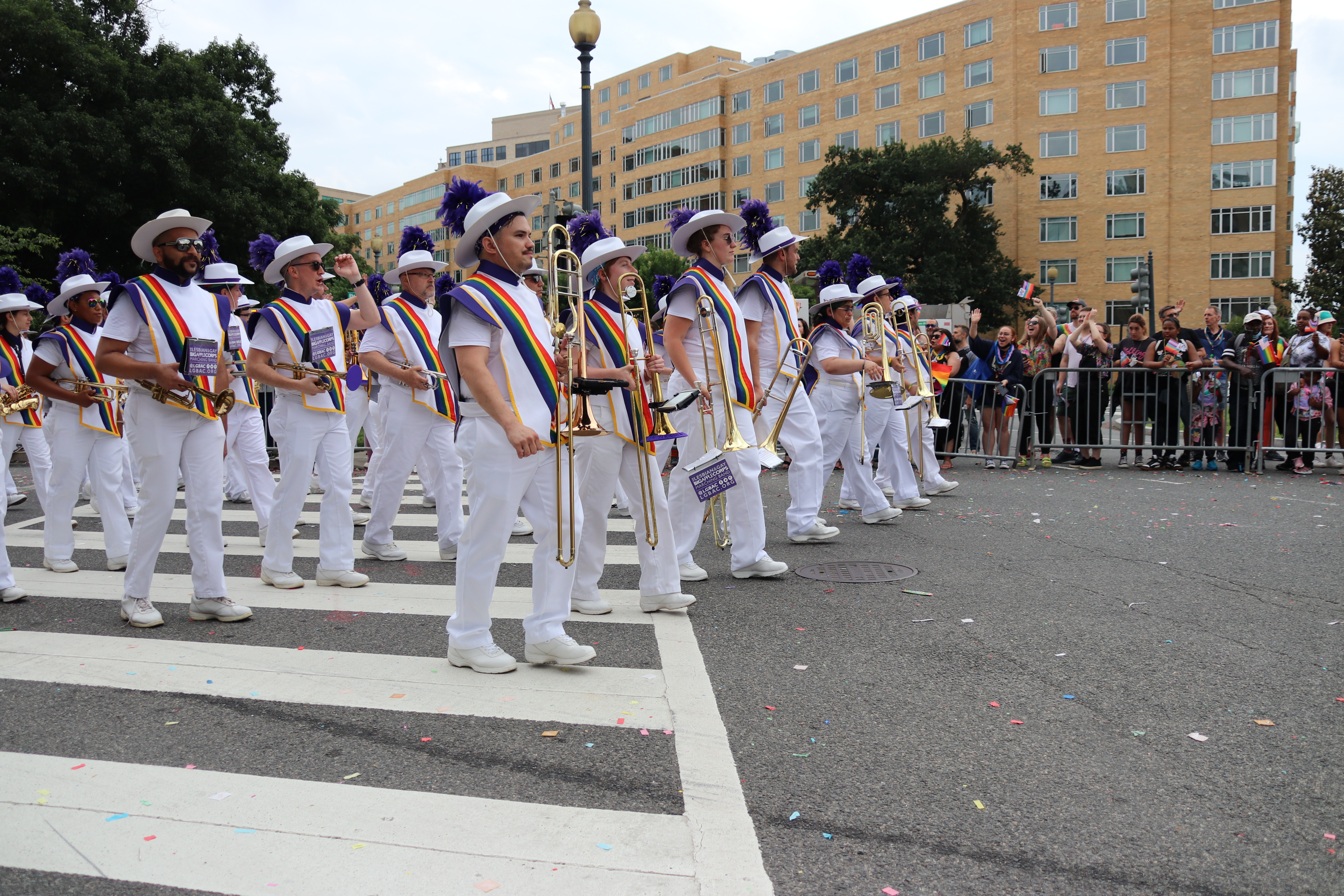
The Queer Big Apple Corps at Capital Pride (Washington, D.C.) in 2022

The mission of QBAC is to provide the queer community with a supportive and friendly environment for musical and artistic expression and, through performance, to promote social acceptance, equality, and harmony for all. Membership is all-inclusive, predominantly lesbian, gay, bisexual, transgender, and queer, and the band welcomes heterosexual players as well.

== History ==
The band was founded in 1979 by Nancy Corporan and Bob Wolff, with Corporan as the group's first Artistic Director. They were inspired by Jon Reed Sims, the founder of the San Francisco Gay Freedom Day Marching Band and Twirling Corps. In 1980, the band became the first openly queer musical group to perform at the Lincoln Center. In June 1980, the band headed the New York Pride march.

In November 1980, after a gunman killed two people in a West Village gay bar, the band played The Battle Hymn of the Republic and We Shall Overcome at the funeral ceremony.

Under a new name, the Lesbian and Gay Big Apple Corps, the band continued to head pride marches. It also began to perform at benefits concerts and rallies for AIDS victims throughout the 1980s and 1990s. During this time, the band lost 33 of its members to the AIDS Crisis. At one concert in Queens in 1985, the band was pelted with "eggs and verbal abuse." In 1989, the LGBAC played at the ceremony where Mayor Ed Koch dedicated Stonewall Place. Later that year, the band performed in the Village Halloween Parade, a yearly tradition the band has continued for decades.

In the 1990s, the LGBAC began to regularly perform outside of New York. In 1990, the band joined the Philadelphia Lesbian and Gay Pride Parade-Festival, and in 1993 they joined the second annual New Jersey Gay Pride March. In 2002, the band performed in the Montclair Fourth of July parade for the first time.

In 2013, the band performed at the New York City Marathon for the first time. In 2014, they performed at the opening of the High Line. On Nov. 26, 2020 the band performed virtually on national television as part of the annual Macy's Thanksgiving Day Parade. In 2022, QBAC was invited back to march the parade, making them the first all-queer marching band in the parade's history.

== Contemporary appearances ==
The band performs year-round as both a symphonic band and a marching band.

As a symphonic band, QBAC traditionally produces two concerts each year, one in the fall and the other in the spring. Chamber music concerts are offered occasionally. The Symphonic Band's Artistic Director is Henco Espag.

As a marching band, QBAC marches in a wide variety of events, predominantly gay pride marches such as the NYC Pride March, July 4 parades, and the Greenwich Village Halloween Parade. The band has also performed at the US Open.

The marching band includes a featured dance team and a color guard. Since 2004, the Marching Band's Artistic Director has been Marita Begley, who first joined the band in 1982. She also held the position of drum major from 1986-1995 and 2001-2026.

== In media ==
In 1999, PBS produced a documentary titled "We're the Marching Band Your Mother Warned You About!" about the LGBAC.

== See also ==
- San Francisco Lesbian/Gay Freedom Band
- Freedom Band of Los Angeles
- Pride of Indy Band and Color Guard
