= Jersey Battle of Flowers =

Carnival in the Channel Islands

Battle of Flowers
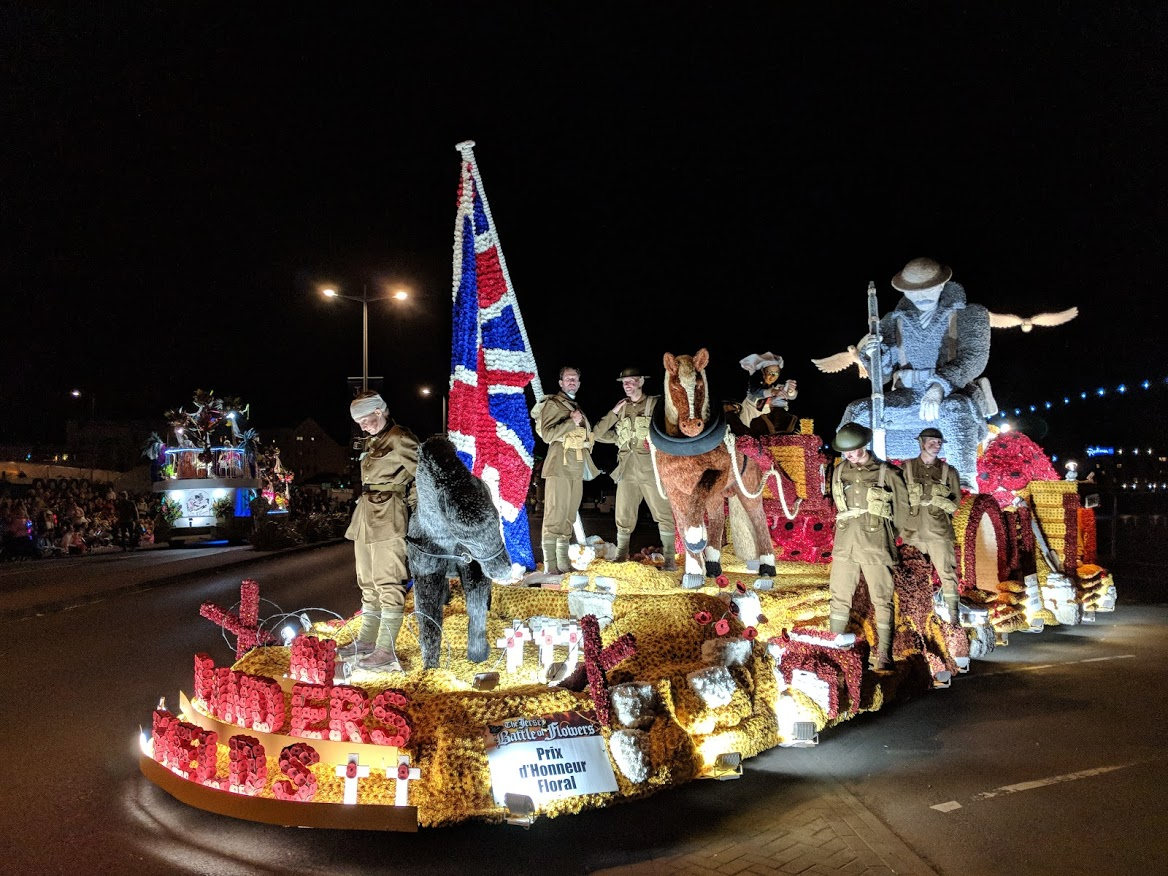
- 'In Flanders Fields' by The Optimists Club – Winners of 2018 Jersey Battle of Flowers Prix d'Honneur, Spectators' Award and Owen Wiscombe Design Award
- Dates: Second Friday & Saturday of August each Year
- Location: Jersey
- Years active: 124
- Inaugurated: 9 August 1902
- Attendance: 14,000
- Website: www.battleofflowers.com

The Jersey Battle of Flowers is an annual carnival held in the Channel Island of Jersey on the second Friday and Saturday of August. The festival consists of music, funfairs, dancers, majorettes and a parade of flower floats alongside various street entertainers. It was inaugurated in 1902 to celebrate the coronation of King Edward VII and Queen Alexandra. The largest attendance to date is thought to be that of 1969 when 60,000 people were present. Current spectator numbers are around 20,000.

The major floats are usually produced by the parishes of Jersey.

The 'Battle' itself originally consisted of dismantling the floats to provide floral ammunition for a literal battle of flowers between participants and spectators, but this aspect has long been abandoned. Since 1989, a nighttime Moonlight Parade with the floats festooned in lights has been introduced. The Moonlight Parade ends with a fireworks display. Recent years have seen higher turnouts to the moonlight parade, which attracts locals as well as tourists possibly due to its party atmosphere.

== History ==
The first Battle of Flowers was held on 9 August 1902 on Victoria Avenue, Saint Helier. The First World War interrupted the tradition and it was not until 1928 that the Battle was revived at Springfield where it was held until 1938. The threat of war meant the 1939 event was abandoned and it was not until 1951 that the event was revived back on Victoria Avenue, where it was held for many years on the last Thursday in July (since moved to its current date).

In 1964 the event was attended by around 50,000 people.

The ongoing outbreak of coronavirus in 2020 and 2021 caused the very first cancellation of the Battle since its revival in 1951.

== Prizes ==
Prizes are awarded in numerous categories, with their names in French, for floats of different sizes and types. Listed here are the main prizes with the Prix d’Honneur being the overall winner.

=== 2022 ===
Top Prize Winners of 2022 Jersey Battle of Flowers

- Prix d’Honneur: The Optimists Club – "When Movies Were Movies"
- Prix d'Excellence: Parish of Grouville – "Ghost Train"
- Prix D’Honneur de Papier: Parish of St Saviour – "Huang Long"
- Grand Prix des Fleurs: Parish of St Clement – "C’est Magique"
- Prix de Mérite: Friends of Galaad – "Wimbo wa Ngoma"
- Spectators' Award: The Optimists Club – "When Movies Were Movies"
- Prix D'Honneur Junior: Parish of St Lawrence Juniors -"Madhatter's Tea Party"
- Junior Spectators' Award: Parish of St Lawrence Juniors -"Madhatter's Tea Party"

Battle of Flowers did not take place in 2020 or 2021 due to Covid

=== 2019 ===
Winners of 2019 Jersey Battle of Flowers

- Prix d’Honneur: The Optimists Club – "Oliver"
- Prix d'Excellence: Parish of St Peter – "Music Evolution"
- Prix D’Honneur de Papier: Parish of St Helier – "Save the Bees"
- Grand Prix des Paroisses: Parish of St Clement – "A Polar Paradise"
- Grand Prix des Fleurs: Whiteside Family and Friends – "The Spirit of America"
- Prix de Mérit: Friends of Galaad – "This Ol' House"

=== 2018 ===
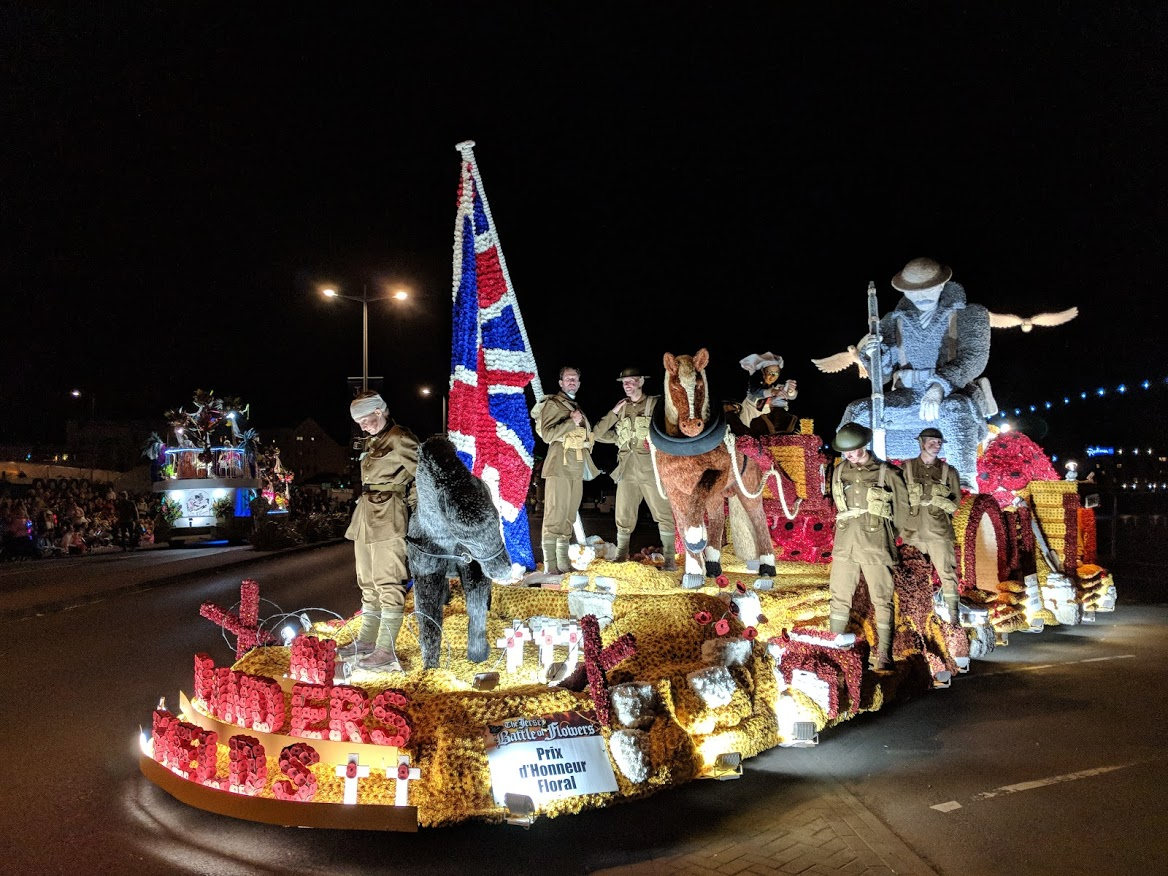
'In Flanders Fields' by The Optimists Club – Winners of 2018 Jersey Battle of Flowers Prix d'Honneur, Spectactors' Award and Owen Wiscombe Design Award

Winners at the 2018 Battle of Flowers included:

- Prix d'Honneur: The Optimists Club – "In Flanders Fields"
- Prix d'Excellence: Parish of St Clement – "Into the Woods"
- Prix D’Honneur de Papier: Parish of St Helier – "The Willow Pattern"
- Grand Prix des Paroisses: Parish of Trinity – "La Cage aux Folles"
- Grand Prix des Fleurs: Whiteside Family and Friends – "Neverland"
- Prix de Mérite: Grouville Juniors – "Thrill'ar"
- Spectators' Award: The Optimists Club – "In Flanders Fields"
- Design Award (over 30 ft) : The Optimists Club – "In Flanders Fields"
- Design Award (under 25 ft) : Grouville Juniors – "Thrill'ar"
- Best Illuminated Float (over 30 ft): Parish of St. Helier – "The Willow Pattern"
- Best Illuminated Float (under 25 ft): Grouville Juniors – "Thrill'ar"

=== 2016 ===
Winners at the 2016 Battle of Flowers included:

- Prix d'Honneur: The Optimists Club – "Ghost Ship"
- Prix d'Excellence: Parish of St Clement – "Go West"
- Prix D’Honneur de Papier: Parish of St Helier – "Alice in Wonderland"
- Grand Prix des Paroisses: Parish of Grouville – "Latin Fantasy"
- Grand Prix des Fleurs: Adrian and Friends – 'Spellbound'
- Prix de Mérite: Friends of Galaad – 'Eastern Promise'
- Spectators' Award: The Optimists Club – "Ghost Ship"

=== 2015 ===
Winners at the 2015 Battle of Flowers included:

- Prix d'Honneur: The Optimists Club – "Eye of the Tiger"
- Prix d'Excellence: Parish of St. Brelade – "Dragonara"
- Prix D’Honneur de Papier: Parish of St Helier – "SS Vega"
- Grand Prix des Paroisses: Parish of St. Peters – "Cuban Cocktail"
- Grand Prix des Fleurs: Adrian and Friends – "Scooby Doo & The Haunted Mansion"
- Prix de Mérite: Whiteside Family & Friends – "Hakuna Matata"
- Prix Décor: St Saviour's Juniors – "Yabbad Abbadoo"
- Spectators' Award: The Optimists Club – "Eye of the Tiger"
- Best Illuminated Float (over 25 ft): The Optimists Club "Eye of the Tiger"
- Best Illuminated Float (under 25 ft): The Optimists Club Juniors – "Jolly Roger"

=== 2014 ===
Winners at the 2014 Battle of Flowers included:

- Prix d'Honneur: The Optimists Club 'Fire Cracker'
- Prix d'Excellence: St Clement's 'The Snow Queen'
- Grand Prix des Paroisses: St Brelade's 'Matryoshka'
- Grand Prix des Fleurs: Rob Adrian and Friends 'Fillmore at Motor Mall'
- Prix de Mérite: St Saviour's 'Priscilla, Queen of the Desert'
- Prix Décor: St Saviour's Juniors 'Wacky Races’Yabbad Abbadoo
- Spectators' Award: The Optimists Club 'Fire Cracker'
- Best Illuminated Float (over 25 ft): The Optimists Club 'Fire Cracker'
- Best Illuminated Float (under 25 ft): Adrian and Friends Juniors 'Fillmore at Motor Mall'

=== 2013 ===
Winners at the 2013 Battle included:

- Prix d'Honneur: The Optimists Club 'Beyond the Barricade'

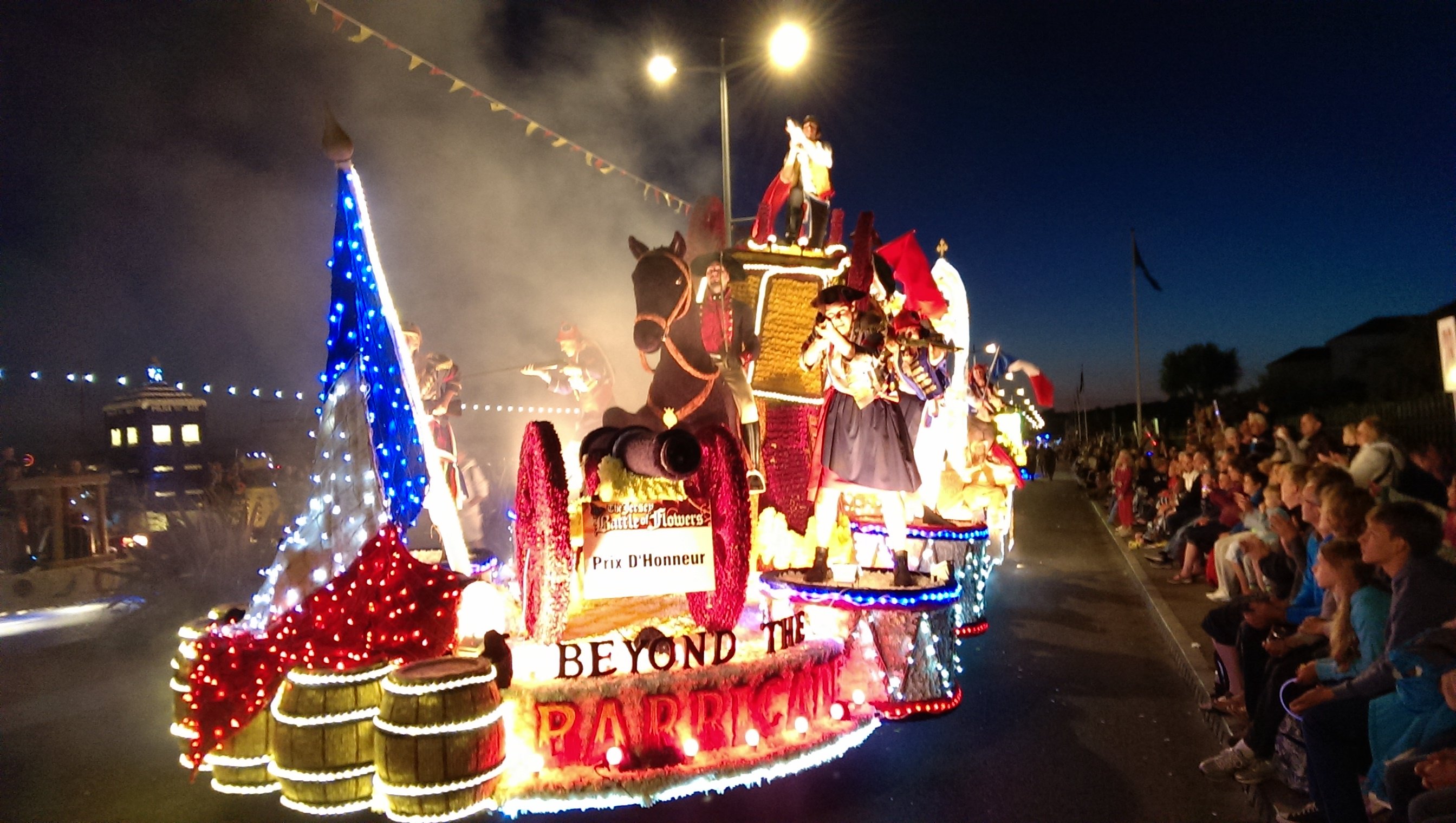
Optimists Club 2013 Prix d'Honneur Winning Entry 'Beyond the Barricade' at Moonlight Parade - Best Illuminated Float over 25ft

- Prix d'Excellence: St Brelade's 'Chang'
- Grand Prix des Paroisses: St Clement's 'Elephanta'
- Grand Prix des Fleurs: Rob Adrian and Friends 'Who's Who'
- Prix de Mérite: Friends of Galaad 'Sweeps 'N' All'
- Prix Décor: St Saviour's 'Never Ending Stories'
- Spectators' Award: The Optimists Club 'Beyond the Barricade'
- Best Illuminated Float (over 25 ft): The Optimists Club 'Beyond the Barricade'
- Best Illuminated Float (under 25 ft): Parish of St. Peter Juniors 'Mary Poppins'

=== 2012 ===
Winners at the 2012 Battle included:

- Prix d'Honneur: The Optimists Club – "Those Magnificent Men in Their Flying Machines"
- Prix d'Excellence: Parish of St. Clement – "Neverland"
- Grand Prix des Paroisses: Parish of St. Brelade – "Shangri-La"
- Grand Prix des Fleurs: Rob Adrian and Friends – "S-Car-Go"
- Prix d'Honneur de Papier: Peter Heath and Friends – "Gnomeville"
- Prix de Mérite: Friends of Galaad – "Jack O'Lantern"
- Spectators' Award: The Optimists Club – "Those Magnificent Men in Their Flying Machines"
- Best Illuminated Float (over 25 ft): The Optimists Club – "Those Magnificent Men in Their Flying Machines"
- Best Illuminated Float (under 25 ft): Parish of St. Peter – "The Muppet Show"

=== 2011 ===
Winners at the 2011 Battle included:

- Prix d'Honneur: Parish of St. Clement – "Wonderland"
- Prix d'Excellence: The Optimists Club – "Wild Wild West"
- Grand Prix des Paroisses: Parish of Grouville
- Grand Prix des Fleurs: Rob Adrian and Friends
- Prix d'Honneur de Papier: Peter Heath and Friends
- Prix de Mérite: Friends of Gallard

. Spectators Award : Parish of St.Clement – Wonderland

=== 2010 ===
Winners at the 2010 Battle included:

- Prix d'Honneur: Parish of St. Clement – "Shen Lung"
- Prix d'Excellence: The Optimists Club – "Showboat"
- Prix Decor: The Henwood Ensemble
- Grand Prix des Paroisses: Parish of Grouville
- Grand Prix des Fleurs: The Jersey Young Farmers Club
- Prix d'Honneur de Papier: Peter Heath and Friends
- Prix de Mérite: Parish of Grouville (Juniors)
- Spectators' Award: The Optimists Club – "Showboat"
- Best Illuminated Float (over 25 ft): The Optimists Club – "Showboat"

=== 2009 ===
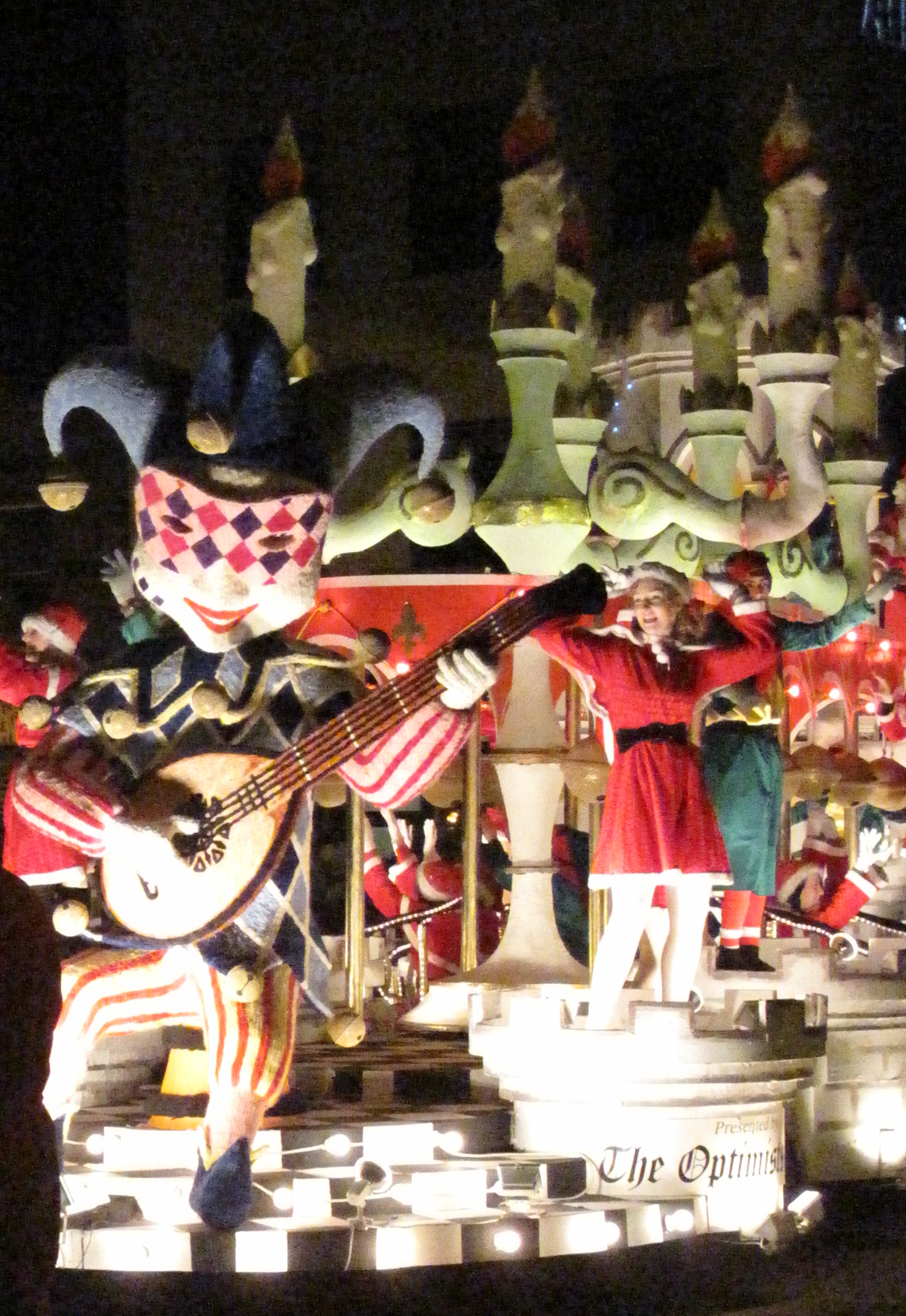
Battle of Flowers parade, 13 December 2009, Saint Helier, Jersey

Winners at the 2009 Battle included:

- Prix d'Honneur: Parish of St. Saviour – "Hanamachi"
- Prix d'Excellence: Parish of St. Clement – "Olympus"
- Grand Prix des Fleurs: The Optimists Club – "Court Jesters"
- Grand Prix des Paroisses: Parish of Trinity – Themed on 50 years of Durrell Wildlife Conservation Trust
- Best Illuminated Float (over 25 ft): The Optimists Club – "Court Jesters"

=== 2008 ===
Winners at the 2008 Battle included:

- Prix d'Honneur: The Optimists Club – "Circus"
- Prix d'Excellence: Saint Saviour
- Grand Prix des Paroisses: Trinity
- Grand Prix des Fleurs: Jersey Young Farmers Club
- Prix d'Honneur de Papier: Peter Heath and Friends
- Prix de Mérite: Friends of Galaad
- Spectators' Award: The Optimists Club – "Circus"

=== 2007 ===
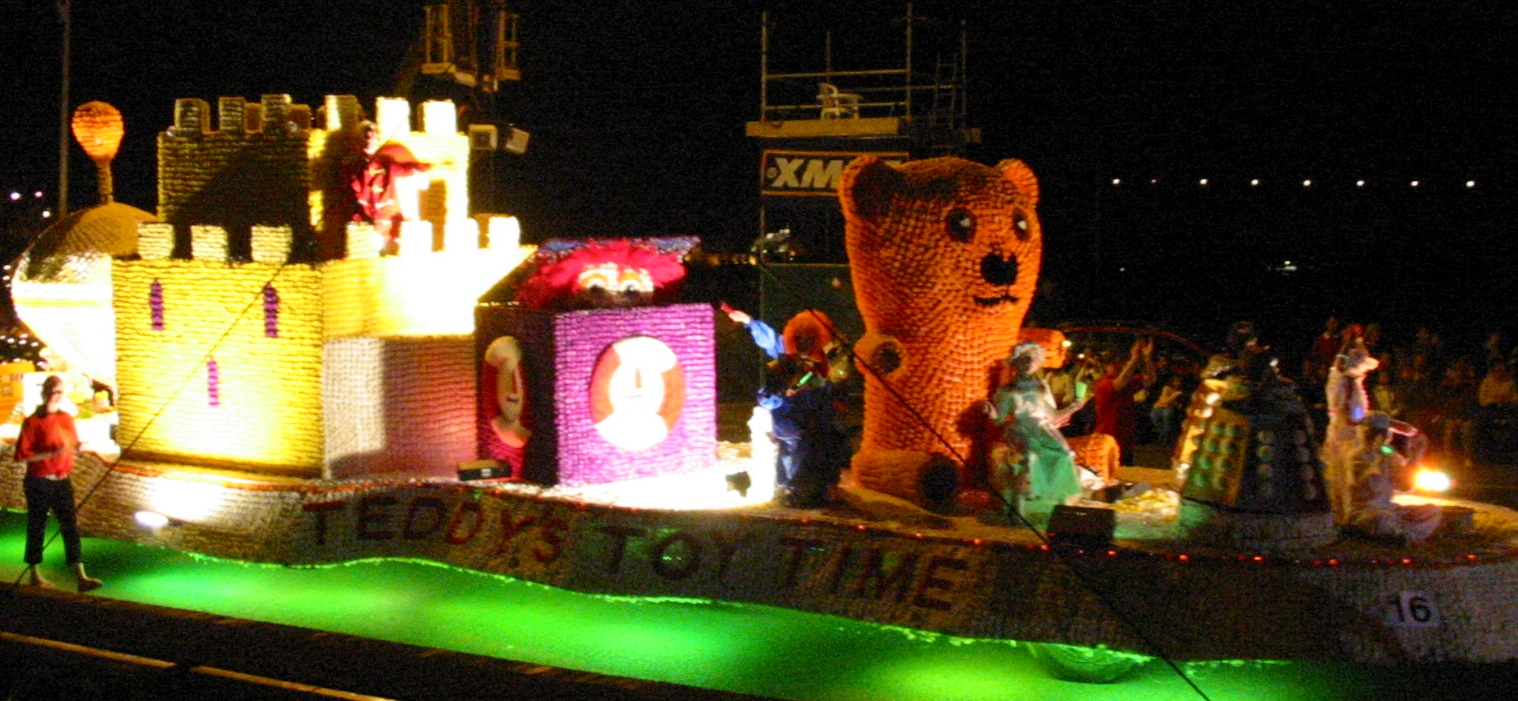
Teddy's Toytime by St Martin, 2007

Winners at the 2007 Battle included:

- Prix d'Honneur: Parish of St. Clement
- Prix d'Excellence: The Optimists Club – "Valhalla"
- Grand Prix des Paroisses: Trinity
- Grand Prix des Fleurs: Rob, Adrian and Friends
- Prix d'Honneur de Papier: Peter Heath and Friends
- Prix de Mérite: John Le Cornu Family and Friends
- Best Illuminated Float (over 25 ft): The Optimists Club – "Valhalla"

=== 2006 ===
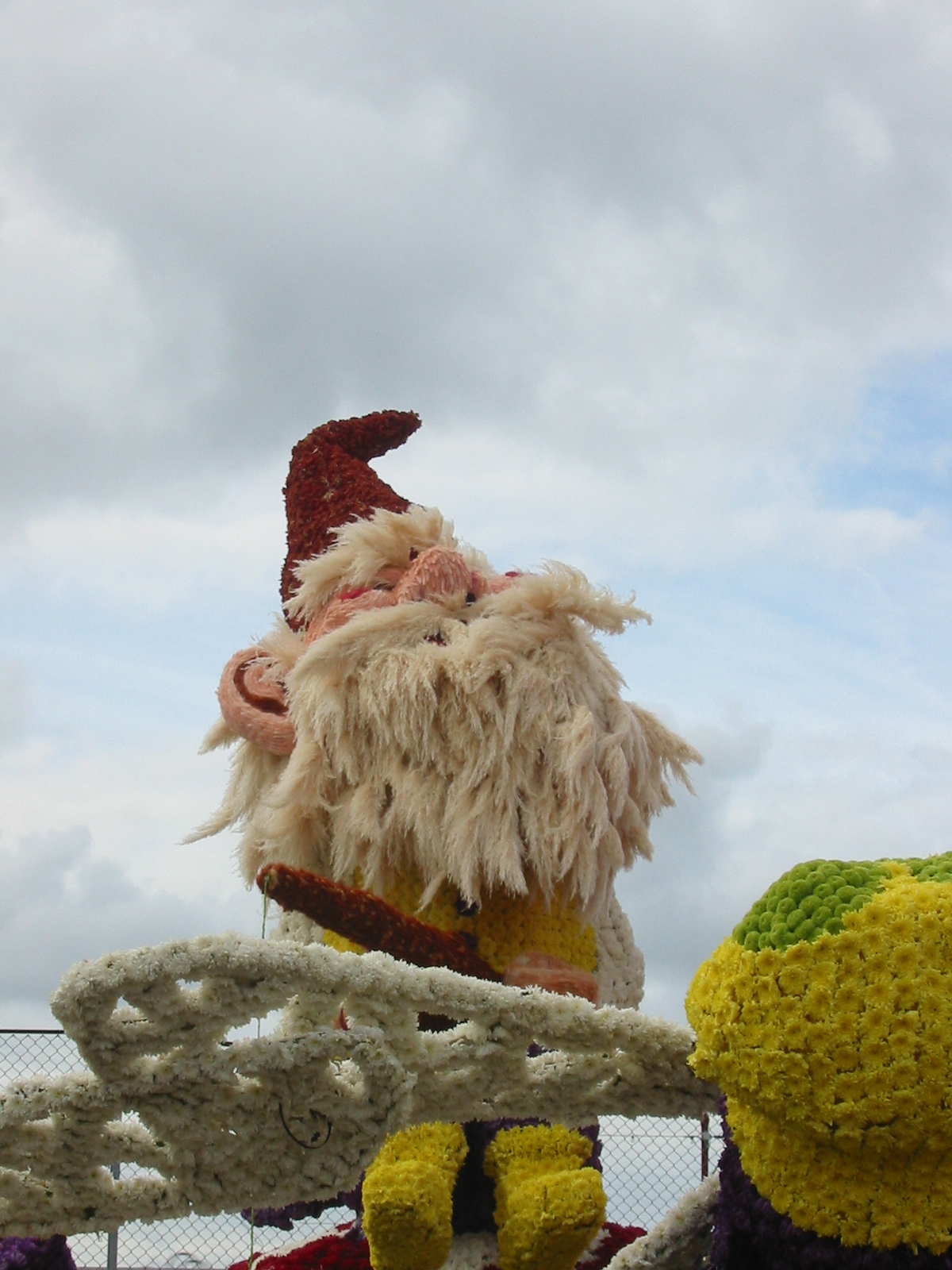
A Gnome sits fishing from his toadstool on the Grouville Too Float, 2006

Winners at the 2006 Battle included:

- Prix d'Honneur: Parish of St. Clement
- Prix d'Excellence: The Optimists Club – "Off The Rails"
- Grand Prix des Paroisses: Parish of Trinity
- Grand Prix des Fleurs: Mary Bidan and Friends
- Prix d'Honneur de Papier: Peter Heath and Friends
- Prix de Mérite: Grouville Too
- Best Illuminated Float (over 25 ft): The Optimists Club – "Off The Rails"

=== 2005 ===
Winners at the 2005 Battle included:

- Prix d'Honneur: The Optimists Club – "Merry Christmas"
- Prix d'Excellence: Parish of St. Clement
- Grand Prix des Paroisses: Parish of Grouville
- Grand Prix des Fleurs: Mary Bidan and Friends
- Prix d'Honneur de Papier: Peter Heath Family and Friends
- Prix de Mérite: Optimists Juniors
- Spectators' Award: The Optimists Club – "Merry Christmas"
- Best Illuminated Float (over 25 ft): The Optimists Club – "Merry Christmas"

== Miss Battle of Flowers and Mr Battle ==
As of 2018 the role of Miss Battle has been replaced with 'Jersey Battle of Flowers Ambassador' open to both genders, this was to avoid the stereotyping of a beauty pageant. The Ambassador role is open to any young person between the ages of 17 and 25 years who have been ordinarily resident in Jersey for at least two years.

A competition to select a Miss Battle was held, each year, in the months preceding the Battle. The competition involves a set of contests held in each of the parishes. A winner is selected in each parish, and these ladies are entered into the final competition to select the year's Miss Battle of Flowers.

Miss Battle of Flowers, the overall winner of the Miss Parish contests, rides on her own specially made float. There was also formerly a Maid of Honour who rode with the Miss Battle but this has now been replaced with the Jersey Battle of Flowers Consort. The tradition of having a Mr Battle to escort Miss Battle was in abeyance for a number of years, but Kyran Bracken revived the role in 2007.

The table below lists some years, but is not a complete list.

Miss Battle winners by year
	Winner	Mr Battle	Notes
2015	Chantelle Mundy	Craig Philips	
2014	Holly Perchard	Ray Quinn	
2013	Taye Le Monnier	Mikey North	
2012	Rebecca Houze	Matthew Wolfenden	
2011	Alice Cubbage	Gareth Gates	
2010	Sarah Watson	Danny Young	
2009	Lucy O'Sullivan	Marco Pierre White	
2008	Holly Fraser	Christopher Biggins	
2007	Victoria Trèhorel	Kyran Bracken	
2006	Sinead Brennan		Andy Abraham and Jodie Marsh were hired as guests for the event.
2005	Victoria Keen		
2004	Sophie Chaopradith		
2003	Hannah Tully		
2002	Maria Da Silva	Jimmy Savile	
1995	Jenny Hill	Lionel Blair	
1994	Sandra Neves	Ian Botham	
1992	Louise Coleman	Stefan Dennis	
1991	Kirsty Le Blond	Matthew Kelly	
1990	Emma Clarke	Jonathon Morris	
1988	Anna O'Shea	Roy Castle	
1987	Catherine Inman	Mike Read	
1986	Julie Haywood	Keith Chegwin	
1985	Kristina Fanaken	David Hamilton	
1984	Sally Vibert	Francis Wilson	
1983	Collette Le Riche	Gareth Hunt	
1982	Julie Haywood	Keith Chegwin	
1981	Susan Harris		
1980	Karen Poole	William Roache	
1979	Tracy Quinn	Leslie Crowther	
1978	June Wilson	Sacha Distel	
1977	Diana Le Bot	Des O Connor	
1976	Susan Hughes	Richard O'Sullivan	
1974	Susan de Gruchy	Hughie Green	
1973	Shan Coralie Ellison	Henry Cooper	
1972		Jimmy Savile	
1970		Bernard Breslaw	
1969		Jimmy Savile	
1968	Sheila Renault	John Gregson	
1967	Shirley Knowles	Lonnie Donnegan	
1966	Jean Godel	Stratford Johns	
1965	Mary Hill	Leslie Crowther	
1963		Pete Murray	
1960	Carol Geary	Stirling Moss	
1959	Maureen Whittingham	Frankie Vaughan	
1958	Peggy Poole	James Robertson Justice	
1957	Jean Oeillet	Jack Hawkins	
1951	Petula Clark		Battle's first lady of flowers, rather than Miss Battle.
