= Derby Serenaders =

UK musical group

- Location: Derby, England
- Founded: 1936
- Director: D Charlie Simpson
- Members: 26

The Derby Serenaders International Showband were a Marching band based in Derby, England. Due to the flair and originality of their uniforms and displays, and their highly original musical arrangements, they are generally considered to be one of the best and most successful carnival/marching bands in history.

This is largely due to the inspirational leadership, talent and commitment of their musical director of almost fifty years, Maurice "Moz" Ward. Moz was a pivotal figure and inspirational presence across the Carnival Band Movement and their two leagues, the Carnival Band Secretaries League (CBSL) and Carnival Band Association (CBA).

This tremendous influence across the entire marching band movement, which at its height involved over 100 bands and over 10,000 people across the East Midlands of England, is now the subject of the international feature film documentary Moz's Band currently in pre-production and being directed by Moz's grandson, the Peaky Blinders, Bulletproof and Hollyoaks actor and film-maker David Chabeaux.

The Serenaders traditionally had a Latin American style of music and Spanish Gypsy style of uniform. They practiced at various locations over the years including St Augustines Community Centre in Normanton, Severn Trent Raynesway, Pride Park Stadium, Derby and Queens Hall, Derby.

The band performed as originally formed (a marching band) between 1936 & 2010 when the band decided a change in direction was needed to preserve the bands "historic" name in the banding world and they moved to a sit down concert band.

== History ==
The Derby Serenaders were formed in 1936 to raise money for hospitals before the National Health Service was founded. Fred G Ward, father of Moz Ward and grandfather of legendary Brighton and Hove Albion FC Nottingham Forest FC and England footballer Peter Ward, himself a member of the Serenaders until his mid teens, was a founding member.

They were founder members of the Carnival Band Secretaries League and won over 250 prizes including a record 20 consecutive first prizes.

== Uniform ==
The uniform consists of a black, wide brimmed hat. The female members also wear a red rose in the hatband on the left side. A white blouse shirt under a red Bolero waistcoat with gold adornments. Black trousers with red flashes in the outside seam from knee to ankle. Red cummerbund with sash and tassel falling from the left side. Plain black shoes.

== Notable achievements ==
Representing Great Britain in international competitions in Belgium and twice in Spain (1992, 1994)

Official cultural representatives of England in Lens, France for World Cup 1998.

Many appearances on Local, National and International Television, including special features on The Generation Game (BBC) and Spare Time (BBC).

Opening ceremony of Derby County Football Clubs' Pride Park Stadium in the presence of Queen Elizabeth II and The Duke of Edinburgh.

All England, Carnival Band Secretaries League, Midland Counties, South East Midlands Counties and Spanish Classic Champions.

Resident Band for Derby County Football Club '97-'98 and '98 - '99 seasons.

Tours of France and Scandinavia.

== Appearances ==
The Royal Albert Hall

The Grand National, Aintree

The British Grand Prix, Silverstone

The Lord Mayor of Westminster's New Year Parade
