= Ambassadors Showband Derby =

Marching band

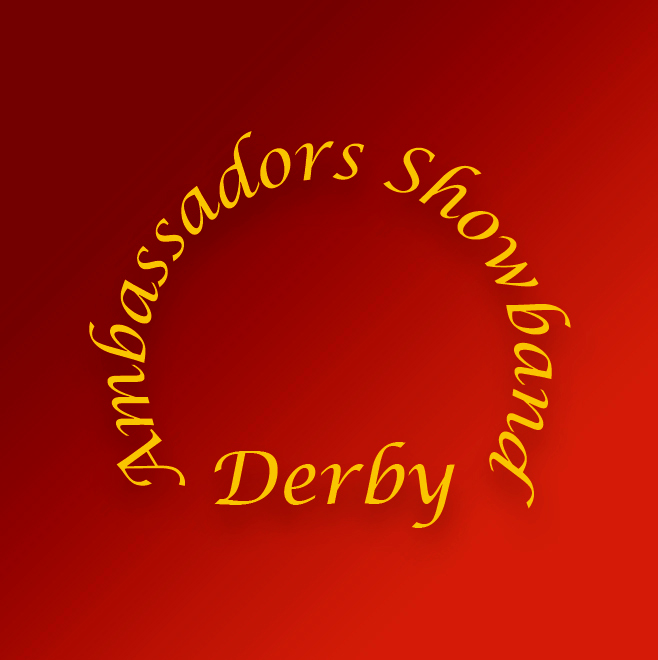
- Location: Derby, England
- Founded: 1979
- Director: Hollie Baker

The Ambassadors Showband Derby is a marching band based in Derby, England

== History ==
The band formed in September 1979 when the 11 founder members held a meeting at the house of Keith Holbrook in Briar Close, Borrowash. By the end of the meeting, the structure of the new organisation, as well as a constitution, had been agreed. Stuart Henson drew up the constitution, which had been agreed, and the Borrowash Band Fund was opened at the Midland Bank. The opening balance of £11 was the donation of £1 from each of the Founder Members. To these people we are eternally grateful.

At a committee meeting in January 1981, the name of the band was added to the constitution. The band may well have been called The Skyliners but after much debate the name, Ambassadors of Borrowash, was chosen.

The band joined the CBSL (Carnival Band Secretaries League) in the fall of 1981 and the performing members were equipped with uniforms.

The first public performance came on 10 July 1982 in a contest at Allestree where the band came third. Derby Regalia came first on this occasion. They continued to compete for the rest of the season as they gained confidence and experience.

Whilst entertaining the public at various fêtes, galas and shows, the band continued to improve in contests until on 25 June 1983 they achieved their first win in a competition. The contest at Duffield saw the Ambassadors secure first place with 77 out of 100 points beating the Rangers of Derby and the Derby Regalia who tied for second place with 76 points.

The band was invited to take part in the 2005 Birmingham Tattoo alongside bands such as the band of the Coldstream Guards and many others. This was the biggest event that the band has ever taken part in.

== Uniform ==
The uniform consists of a yellow shirt/blouse, red waistcoat, black trousers with red strips down the seams and yellow flashes at the bottom, the band also wear tri-corn hats.

== Notable achievements ==
- Duffield 25 June 1983 - First Contest attendance
- Breaston 28 June 1986 - First Place
- Ilkeston Sat 30 May 1987 - First Place
- Long Eaton Sat 6 June 1987 - First Place
- Ashbourne 11 July 1987 - First Place
- Horsley Woodhouse Sat 18 July 1987 - First Place
- Plessey (Beeston) 20 July 1987 - First Place
- Chesterfield 1st Aug 1987 - First Place
- Long Eaton Sunday 30 August 1987 - First Place
- Ashbourne 9 July 1988 - First Place
- Loscoe 10 July 1988 - First Place
- Chesterfield 5th Aug 1988 - First Place
- Alvaston - Wilmorton 18 June 1989 - First Place
- Ashbourne 8 July 1989 - First Place
- Loscoe 9 July 1989 - First Place
- Kirk Hallam 6th Aug 1989 - First Place
- Lowestoft Aug 12th 1989 - First Place
- Wilmorton Sunday 17 June 1990 - First Place
- Breaston June 23, 1990 - First Place
- Granby Halls 29 September 1990 - First Place
- Chaddesden 9 June 1991 - First Place
- Ambergate (county show) 16 June 1991 - First Place
- Breaston 22 June 1991 - First Place
- Derby 13th Aug 1991 - First Place
- Ashbourne 11 July 1992 - First Place
- Derby 2 August 1992 - First Place
- Lowestoft 8th Aug 1992 - First Place
- Chaddesden 13 June 1993 - First Place
- Heanor 26 June 1993 - First Place
- Wilmorton 27 June 1993 - First Place
- Bakewell 3 July 1993 - First Place
- Ashbourne 10 July 1993 - First Place
- Chaddesden 12 June 1994 - First Place
- Chaddesden Sun 11 June 1995 - First Place
- Breaston 24 June 1995 - First Place
- Bakewell 1 July 1995 - First Place
- Lowestoft 12 Aug 1995 - First Place
- Derby 20th Aug 1995 - First Place
- Breaston 22 June 1996 - First Place
- Chapel-en-le-Frith 7 July 1996 - First Place
- Horsley Woodhouse 20 July 1996 - First Place
- Derby 4th Aug 1996 - First Place
- Belper 17th Aug 1996 - First Place
- Newton 2012 - First Place
- Sutton-on-Sea 29 July 2012 - Best band on parade
