= Freedom Band of Los Angeles =

The mission of the Freedom Band of Los Angeles is to bring together the diverse communities of Southern California (including lesbian, gay, bisexual, transgender and straight) through education, rehearsal and performance of music and other performing arts. It is second musical organization of its kind in the world to be founded.

== History ==
Founded in 1978 to lead the annual Gay Pride Parade, the Great American Yankee Freedom Band of Los Angeles is an adult community marching band made up solely of volunteers. The group has performed locally as well as nationally and internationally in concert, at street fairs, and community service organization functions. In the past, the band has appeared in nearly every Southland Parade.

In the early days of the band's history the gay pride movement was just beginning. There few gay events around the Southland, so the band increased the visibility of the gay community by performing in non-LGBTQ-related parades. The focus of the band at that time was primarily as a marching unit. The use of the words "Great American Yankee" allowed the group to sneak into these parades by disguising the word "GAY". Longtime members remember the surprised faces of parade watchers when the bass drum with band's logo passed by, and the realization sank in of what the acronym for the band name meant.

As the gay community became more visible, more and more gay events were planned. This created more opportunities for the band and membership grew. The band reached its peak in membership during 1991 around the time when the Los Angeles Gay Freedom Band was invited to play for President Bill Clinton's first inauguration.

During the 1990s the band lost many members. Some were lost in the AIDS epidemic, others to busy lifestyles or changes in the community. Membership dwindled, but the band stayed alive through the dedication of committed members. The millennium has brought a renewed spirit to the band. A busy performance schedule has brought new and old members to rehearsals once again.

The Freedom Band Foundation of Los Angeles was formed in 2002 as a non-profit corporation to support the instrumental various musical groups associated with the Gay Freedom Band in the Los Angeles area LGBTQ community. The concert band was renamed the Hollywood Wind Ensemble in 2001 to more accurately reflect the nature of the group. With the name change came an expansion of the group's repertoire and professionalism.

Still a volunteer community group, the Wind Ensemble is now a 45 piece symphonic band with a growing reputation and audience. In addition to smaller events such as the annual performance at Disneyland, the group presents two major concerts each year at their new concert "home", Zipper Concert Hall of the Colburn School of Performing Arts. The series includes a fall classics concert and a gala Spring 'pops' concert featuring celebrity guests to raise money for the James M. Berg Scholarship Fund.

In 2003, the Foundation Board sought an appropriate way to commemorate the founding of the Great American Yankee Freedom Band, and the silver anniversary of LGBT music in Los Angeles. The Board decided that they would celebrate the past by investing in the future and created the James M. Berg Scholarship Fund.
