= List of fiddlers =

This list of notable fiddlers shows some overlap with the list of violinists since the instrument used by fiddlers is the fiddle.

== Alphabetical by last name ==
| Name of fiddler | Nationality | Genre(s) |
|---|---|---|
| Joseph Allard | Canadian | French-Canadian |
| Ruby Allmond | American | Country |
| Darol Anger | American | Jazz |
| Jason Anick | American | Jazz |
| Gilles Apap | French | Irish, Gypsy, bluegrass |
| John Arcand | Canadian | Métis |
| Svend Asmussen | Danish | Jazz |
| Aly Bain | Shetland | Scottish, Shetland |
| Dewey Balfa | American | Cajun |
| Kenny Baker | American | Bluegrass |
| Andrew Baxter | American | Blues |
| Randal Bays | American | Irish |
| Donald Angus Beaton | Canadian | Cape Breton |
| Kinnon Beaton | Canadian | Scottish Celtic |
| Miri Ben-Ari | Israeli | Hip-hop |
| Émile Benoît | Canadian | Newfoundland |
| Byron Berline | American | Bluegrass |
| Norman Blake | American | Old time, bluegrass |
| Sedra Bistodeau | American | Old time |
| Tracy Bonham | American | Alternative rock |
| Robert Bowlin | American | Bluegrass |
| Charlie Bowman | American | Old-time |
| Bus Boyk | American | Old-time, country |
| Polly Bradfield | American | Jazz |
| Cecil Brower | American | Western swing |
| Kevin Burke | American | Irish |
| Sam Bush | American | Bluegrass |
| Paddy Canny | Irish | Irish |
| Jean Carignan | Canadian | French-Canadian |
| Andy Carlson | American | Bluegrass |
| Gaither Carlton | American | Appalachian, Old time |
| Ernie Carpenter | American | Appalachian, old time |
| French Carpenter | American | Appalachian, old time |
| Shelt Carpenter | American | Appalachian, old time |
| Liz Carroll | American | Irish |
| Fiddlin' John Carson | American | Appalachian, old time |
| Eliza Carthy | English | English |
| Hanneke Cassel | American | Bluegrass, Scottish, other |
| Angus Chisholm | Canadian | Cape Breton |
| Harry Choates | American | Cajun |
| Vassar Clements | American | Bluegrass, country, jazz |
| Michael Cleveland | American | Bluegrass |
| Julia Clifford | Irish | Irish traditional |
| Charlie Cline | American | Bluegrass |
| Michael Coleman | Irish | Irish |
| Brian Conway | American | Irish |
| Sharon Corr | Irish | Irish |
| J. P. Cormier | Canadian | Bluegrass |
| Papa John Creach | American | Rock, blues |
| Randy Crouch | American | Blues, country, rock |
| Chris Daring | American | Texas |
| Charlie Daniels | American | Southern US rock |
| Junior Daugherty | American | Western swing, country, traditional |
| Andy de Jarlis | Canadian | Métis |
| Vernon Derrick | American | Bluegrass, Country |
| Michael Doucet | American | Cajun |
| Tommy Doucet | Canadian | Acadian |
| Barry Dransfield | English | English, folk |
| Casey Driessen | American | Bluegrass, Scottish |
| DSharp | American | Classical, electronic dance music, hip hop |
| Stuart Duncan | American | Bluegrass |
| Mark Evitts | American | Pop Country, Bluegrass |
| Mark Feldman | American | Jazz |
| Winston Fitzgerald | Canadian | Cape Breton |
| Henry Flynt | American | Classical hillbilly |
| Canray Fontenot | American | Creole |
| Curly Fox | American | Country |
| Howdy Forrester | American | Texas show-style |
| Alasdair Fraser | Scottish | Scottish |
| D'Jalma Garnier | American | Creole |
| Frankie Gavin | Irish | Irish |
| Rayna Gellert | American | Old time |
| Manoj George | Indian | Indian classical music, World fusion, Indian blues |
| Johnny Gimble | American | Texas swing, bluegrass |
| Matt Glaser | American | Jazz, bluegrass |
| Michael Gorman | Irish | Irish |
| Niel Gow | Scottish | Scottish |
| G. B. Grayson | American | Old time |
| Richard Greene | American | Bluegrass |
| Clinton Gregory | American | Bluegrass, country |
| Bryony Griffith | English | English Folk |
| Petra Haden | American | Alternative rock |
| Merle Haggard | American | Country |
| Theron Hale | American | Old time |
| Ed Haley | American | Old time |
| Bella Hardy | English | English folk |
| John Hartford | American | Old time, bluegrass, country |
| Martin Hayes | Irish | Irish |
| Sid Harkreader | American | Old time |
| Aubrey Haynie | American | Bluegrass |
| Bobby Hicks | American | Bluegrass |
| Daniel Hoffman | American-Israeli | Klezmer |
| Jerry Holland | Canadian | Cape Breton |
| Bob Holt | American | Old time |
| Tommy Hunter | American | Appalachian |
| Eileen Ivers | American | Irish |
| Alan Jabbour | American | Old time, folk |
| Jana Jae | American | Country, Bluegrass |
| Tommy Jarrell | American | Appalachian |
| Ramona Jones | Country | Old time |
| Michael Kang | Korean | Bluegrass |
| Patrick Kelly | Irish | Irish |
| Doug Kershaw | American | Cajun |
| Clark Kessinger | American | Old time |
| Carla Kihlstedt | American | Jazz |
| Paddy Killoran | Irish | Irish |
| Tim Kliphuis | Dutch | Jazz |
| Peter Knight | English | Folk and jazz |
| Kenny Kosek | American | Bluegrass |
| Gundula Krause | German | Bluegrass, cajun, folk, folk-rock |
| Alison Krauss | American | Bluegrass |
| Michelle Lambert | American | Pop |
| Donnell Leahy | Canadian | Cape Breton |
| Andy Leftwich | American | Bluegrass |
| Brad Leftwich | American | Old time |
| Ray Legere | Canadian | Bluegrass |
| Chris Leslie | English | Electric folk |
| Laurie Lewis | American | Bluegrass, old-time |
| Annbjørg Lien | Norwegian | Norwegian |
| Didier Lockwood | French | Jazz |
| Benjamin F. Logan | American | Bluegrass |
| Julie Lyonn Lieberman | American | Blues, jazz, American and world roots styles |
| Sandy MacIntyre | Canadian | Cape Breton |
| Ashley MacIsaac | Canadian | Cape Breton |
| Buddy MacMaster | Canadian | Cape Breton |
| Natalie MacMaster | Canadian | Canadian |
| Mack Magaha | American | Bluegrass |
| Martie Maguire | American | Country/Bluegrass |
| J. E. Mainer | American | Appalachian, old time |
| Benny Martin | American | Bluegrass |
| Marcus Martin | American | Appalachian, old time |
| Andy McGann | Irish | Irish-American |
| Dennis McGee | American | Cajun |
| Sean McGuire | Irish | Irish |
| Clayton McMichen | American | Appalachian, old time |
| French Mitchell | American | Appalachian, old time |
| Don Messer | Canadian | Maritime, folk, old time |
| Bruce Molsky | American | Appalachian |
| Patrick Moran | Canadian | Sliabh Luachra |
| Denis Murphy | Irish | Irish traditional |
| Sierra Noble | Canadian | Métis, Celtic, old time, folk, jazz |
| Máiréad Nesbitt | Irish | Celtic |
| Mark O'Connor | America | Bluegrass, folk, classical |
| Padraig O'Keeffe | Irish | Irish |
| Caoimhín Ó Raghallaigh | Irish | Irish |
| Uncle Charlie Osborne | American | Old time, Appalachian |
| Peter Ostroushko | American | Americana, folk |
| Sixto Palavecino | Argentinian | Argentinian folk |
| Una Palliser | Irish | Irish |
| Donny Parenteau | Canadian | Country, western swing |
| Tommy Peoples | Irish | Irish |
| Jean-Luc Ponty | French | Jazz |
| Tommy Potts | Irish | Irish |
| Ed Reavy | Irish | Irish-American |
| Bridget Regan | American | Irish punk |
| Juan Reynoso | Mexican | Tierra Caliente |
| Bonnie Rideout | American | Scottish |
| Laura Risk | American | Scottish, French-Canadian |
| Fiddlin' Doc Roberts | American | Old time |
| Eck Robertson | American | Old time |
| Posey Rorer | American | Old time |
| Jonathan "Jazz" Russell | American | Jazz |
| Ric Sanders | English | English folk |
| Joel Savoy | American | Cajun |
| Oliver Schroer | Canadian | Composer, various genres |
| Ricky Skaggs | American | Country, bluegrass |
| Nicky Sanders | American | Bluegrass |
| Dinesh Subasinghe | SriLankan | Pop classical, Celtic, folk |
| Ruby Jane Smith | American | Bluegrass |
| Buddy Spicher | American | Bluegrass |
| Uncle Bunt Stephens | American | Old time |
| Lee Stripling | American | Old time |
| Uncle Am Stuart | American | Old time |
| Brenda Stubbert | Canadian | Cape Breton |
| Alicia Svigals | American | Klezmer |
| Dave Swarbrick | English | English folk |
| Gid Tanner | American | Appalachian, old time |
| Gordon Terry | American | Bluegrass |
| Benny Thomasson | American | Texas, old time |
| Uncle Jimmy Thompson | American | Old time |
| Kathryn Tickell | English | Northumbrian |
| Graham Townsend | Canadian | Ottawa Valley |
| Jay Ungar | American | Waltzes, swing |
| Jim Van Cleve | American | Bluegrass |
| Joe Venuti | American | Jazz |
| John Vesey | Irish | Irish traditional |
| Calvin Vollrath | Canadian | Métis |
| Sara Watkins | American | Bluegrass |
| Jenny Wilhelms | Finnish | Folk |
| Benny Williams | American | Bluegrass |
| Claude Williams | American | Jazz |
| Bob Wills | American | Texas swing |
| Melvin Wine | American | Appalachian |
| Chubby Wise | American | Bluegrass |
| Joel Zifkin | Canadian | Folk, rock, blues, abstract |

== By style ==
=== North American ===
==== Canadian styles ====
| Down East | Don Messer; Brian Barron |
| Canadian folk | Oliver Schroer; Tim Chaisson; Daniel Lapp |
| French Canadian/Acadian | Joseph Allard; Jean Carignan; Tommy Doucet; Dominique Dupuis |
| Ottawa Valley | Graham Townsend; April Verch |
| Cape Breton | Donald Angus Beaton; Angus Chisholm; Jerry Holland; Winston Fitzgerald; Sandy MacIntyre; Cynthia MacLeod; Buddy MacMaster; Natalie MacMaster; Ashley MacIsaac; John Morris Rankin; Brenda Stubbert; Dan R. MacDonald; Lee Cremo |
| Métis | Andy de Jarlis; John Arcand; Sierra Noble |
| Newfoundland | Patrick Moran; Émile Benoît |

==== Mexican styles ====
| Tierra Caliente | Juan Reynoso |

==== US styles ====
| Blues | Andrew Baxter; Clarence "Gatemouth" Brown; Papa John Creach (also rock); Julie Lyonn Lieberman (also jazz, American and world roots styles); Randy Crouch (also country, rock); Heather Hardy |
| Bluegrass | Darol Anger (also jazz); Kenny Baker; Byron Berline; Sam Bush; Jason Carter; Vassar Clements (also country, jazz); Michael Cleveland; Charlie Cline; Curly Ray Cline; J. P. Cormier; Vernon Derrick; Casey Driessen; Stuart Duncan; Johnny Gimble; Richard Greene; Clinton Gregory; John Hartford; Aubrey Haynie; Bobby Hicks; Jana Jae (also country); Michael Kang; Kenny Kosek; Gundula Krause (also Cajun, folk, folk-rock); Benjamin F. Logan; Mack Magaha; Martie Maguire; Alison Krauss; Ray Legere; Laurie Lewis; Benny Martin; Mark O'Connor (also classical, folk); Nicky Sanders; Ricky Skaggs; Ruby Jane Smith; Gordon Terry; Jim Van Cleve; Sara Watkins (also alternative); Benny Williams; Chubby Wise |
| Cajun | Dewey Balfa; Harry Choates; Michael Doucet; Doug Kershaw; Gundula Krause (also bluegrass, folk, folk-rock); Dennis McGee; Joel Savoy |
| Country | Clayton McMichen; Ruby Allmond; Vassar Clements (also bluegrass, jazz); Randy Crouch (also blues, rock); Vernon Derrick; Curly Fox; Clinton Gregory; John Hartford; Jana Jae (also bluegrass); Emily Poe; Ricky Skaggs; Mark Evitts |
| Country rock | Charlie Daniels |
| Creole | Calvin Carrière; Canray Fontenot; D'Jalma Garnier |
| Hip-hop | Miri Ben-Ari; Kev Marcus; Damien Escobar; Tourie Escobar |
| Old time | Charlie Bowman; Gaither Carlton; Fiddlin' John Carson; G. B. Grayson; Theron Hale; Ed Haley; Bob Holt; Sid Harkreader; Alan Jabbour; Clark Kessinger; J. E. Mainer; Clayton McMichen; French Mitchell; Fiddlin' Doc Roberts; Eck Robertson; Posey Rorer; Uncle Bunt Stephens; Lee Stripling (also Western swing); Uncle Am Stuart; Gid Tanner; Benny Thomasson; Uncle Jimmy Thompson; Pendleton Vandiver; Melvin Wine |
| Pop | Michelle Lambert |
| Western swing | Cecil Brower; Junior Daugherty; Johnny Gimble; Lee Stripling (also old time); Bob Wills |

=== European fiddling styles ===
| Romani (Gypsy) | Gilles Apap (also Irish); Panna Cinka; Ion Petre Stoican |

==== Irish styles ====
| Irish Celtic | Gilles Apap (also Gypsy, experimental); Kevin Burke; Liz Carroll; John Carty; Julia Clifford; Michael Coleman; Brian Conway; Sharon Corr; Michael Gorman; Frankie Gavin; Martin Hayes; Eileen Ivers; Patrick Kelly; Paddy Killoran; Andy McGann; Sean McGuire; Manus McGuire; James Morrison; Máiréad Nesbitt; Caoimhín Ó Raghallaigh; Una Palliser; Tommy Peoples; Tommy Potts; John Sheahan; John Vesey |
| Sliabh Luachra | Denis Murphy; Padraig O'Keeffe; Patrick Moran |
| Irish punk | Bridget Regan |

==== Jewish styles ====
| Klezmer | Alicia Svigals; Daniel Hoffman (violinist) |

==== Norwegian styles ====
| Hardanger | Annbjørg Lien |

==== UK styles ====
| English | Eliza Carthy; Barry Dransfield; Bryony Griffith; Bella Hardy; Peter Knight; Chris Leslie; Vanessa Mae; Dave Swarbrick; Ric Sanders; Bryony Griffith |
| Scottish Celtic | Aly Bain (also Shetland); Hanneke Cassel; Alasdair Fraser; John McCusker; Angus Chisholm(also Cape Breton); Kinnon Beaton |
| Shetland | Tom Anderson; Aly Bain (also Scottish) |

=== Sri Lankan fiddle style ===
- Dinesh Subasinghe

=== Trans-regional styles ===
==== Folk ====
| Traditional folk | Mark O'Connor (also bluegrass, Cajun, folk-rock); Sixto Palavecino; Jenny Wilhelms |
| Folk-rock | Gundula Krause; Dinesh Subasinghe; Manoj George |

==== Jazz ====
- Darol Anger
- Svend Asmussen
- Polly Bradfield
- Vassar Clements (also country, bluegrass)
- Dave Favis-Mortlock
- Mark Feldman
- Matt Glaser
- Jerry Goodman
- Stéphane Grappelli
- Carla Kihlstedt
- Tim Kliphuis
- Didier Lockwood
- Ray Nance
- Jean-Luc Ponty
- Zbigniew Seifert
- Stuff Smith
- Eddie South
- Boyd Tinsley (also rock)
- Michal Urbaniak
- Joe Venuti
- Claude Williams

==== Rock ====
| Rock | Papa John Creach (also blues); Randy Crouch (also country, blues); Nicky Sanders (also bluegrass); Boyd Tinsley (also jazz); Manoj George (also World fusion & Indian blues) |
