= Celtic music in Canada =

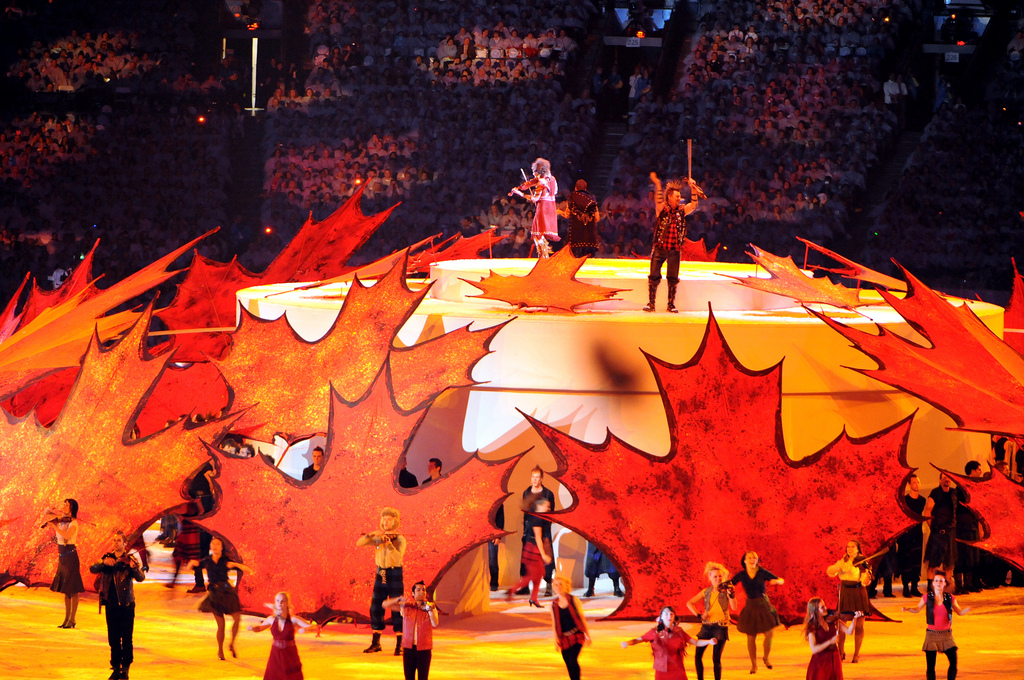
Celtic fiddling traditions in Canada were highlighted by a medley performance during the opening ceremonies of the 2010 Winter Olympics entitled "Rhythms of the Fall".

Celtic music is primarily associated with the folk traditions of Ireland, Scotland, Brittany and Wales, as well as the popular styles derived from folk culture. In addition, a number of other areas of the world are known for the use of Celtic musical styles and techniques, including Newfoundland, and much of the folk music of Canada's Maritimes, especially on Cape Breton Island and Prince Edward Island.

== Newfoundland ==
There are very strong connections between Newfoundland folk music and Irish music, however elements of English folk music and French-Canadian and Acadian music can be heard within the style.

A very traditional strain of Irish music exists in Newfoundland, especially in the primarily Irish-Catholic communities along the southern shore.

The instrumentation in Newfoundland music includes the button accordion, guitar, violin, tin whistle and more recently the bodhrán. Many Newfoundland traditional bands also include bass guitar and drum kit. Other folk instruments such as the mandolin and bouzouki are common especially among Newfoundland bands with an Irish leaning.

Because Newfoundland is an island in the North Atlantic, many of the songs focus on the fishery and seafaring. Many songs chronicle the history of this unique people. Instrumental tune styles include jigs, reels, two steps, and polkas.

=== Newfoundland musicians and musical groups ===
- Fiddle players: Kelly Russell, Émile Benoît and Patrick Moran
- Button accordion players: Minnie White and Harry Hibbs
- Bodhran players: Fergus O'Byrne
- Popular Newfoundland traditional music groups: Irish Descendants and Great Big Sea.
- Irish music band in Newfoundland: Ryan's Fancy

== Nova Scotia and Cape Breton Island ==
Celtic music
Asturias
Brittany
Cornwall
Galicia
Ireland
Isle of Man
Scotland
Wales
Celtic US
Celtic Canada

Cape Breton Island, part of the province of Nova Scotia, is internationally known for its distinctive styles of Cape Breton fiddling, which are derived from Scottish techniques. The island has produced traditional music-based popular performers like John Allan Cameron, the Rankin Family, Natalie MacMaster, Buddy MacMaster, the Barra MacNeils, Rita MacNeil, Ashley MacIsaac and others.

In addition to the fiddle music, there is a parallel style of solo dance bagpiping and a rhythmic syncopated Celtic piano style. Recently, Highland style guitar has received some attention due to the work of Dave MacIsaac among others.

Mary Jane Lamond has attracted attention to the Island's Gaelic song traditions of Milling Frolics (waulking songs in Scotland), Piurt à Beul (mouth music), spinning songs and more.

Irish traditional music is also very popular on the island, particularly Irish folk songs. This is especially prevalent in the communities around North Sydney and Sydney Mines due to the influence of immigrants of Newfoundland Irish descent.

== Prince Edward Island ==
Prince Edward Island has long been associated with traditional Celtic music. Fiddle is the most popular instrument for traditional Celtic music in Prince Edward Island, and piano is the most popular accompaniment instrument. Celtic songs tend to be ballads or other popular songs, or new songs in the same tradition with contemporary backing. Where celidh dance is regular and popular in many rural communities, Irish or Celtic themed nightlife exists in both major cities of Charlottetown and Summerside. Organizations supporting traditional Celtic music include the PEI Fiddlers Association and the Benevolent Irish Society.

== Quebec ==
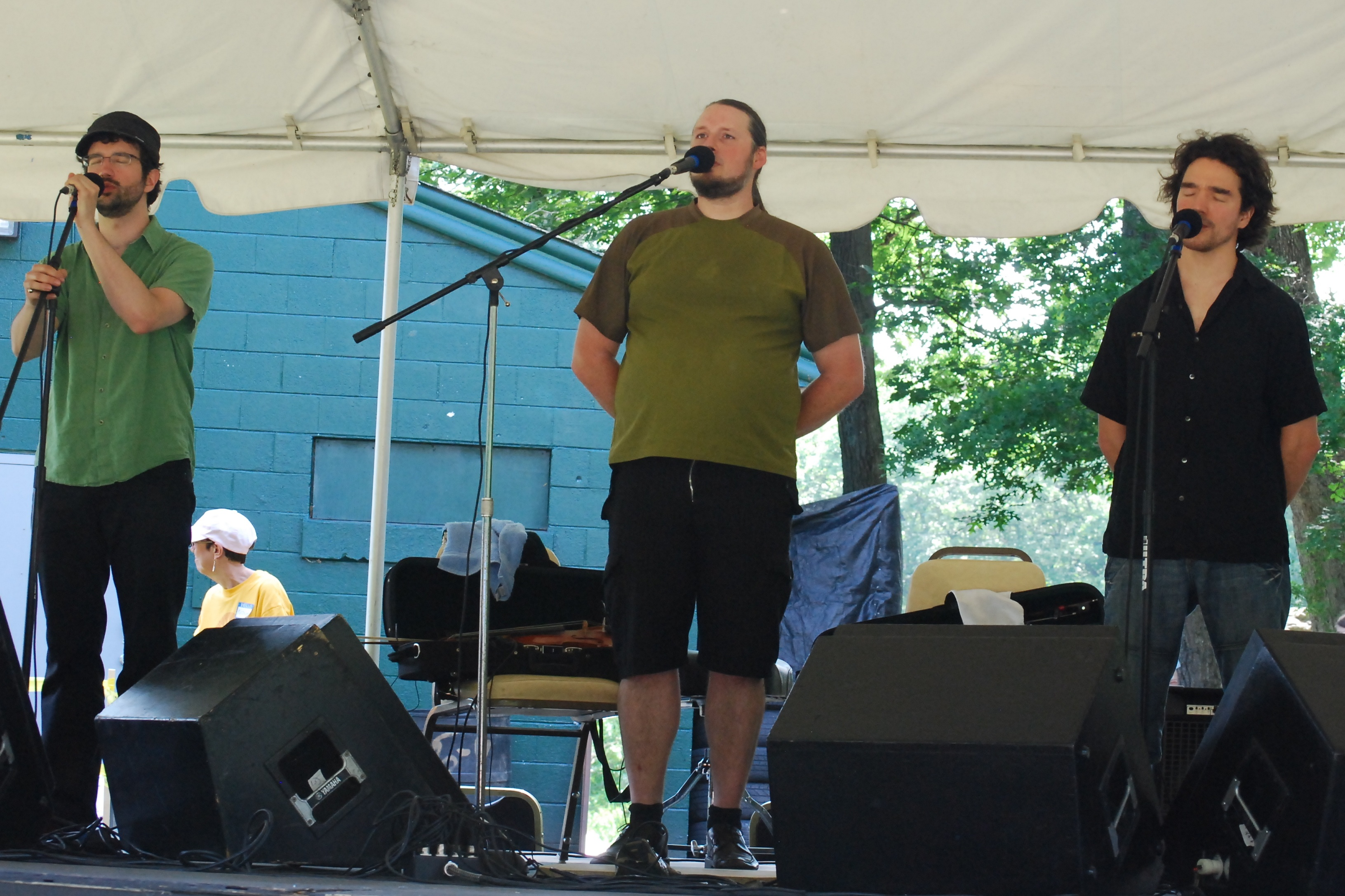
Genticorum, a traditional and Celtic band performing at a Solstice Festival, 18 June 2011

There are strong ties between traditional Québécois music and the music of Brittany, Ireland, Scotland and the Maritimes. The songs generally draw more from the French tradition, whereas the dance tunes are more closely related to Celtic traditions. Fiddle and accordion are the most common lead instruments, while piano and guitar often provide accompaniment. More recently, swing has significantly influenced accompaniment styles and techniques. La Bottine Souriante is one of the most well-recognized groups which exemplifies this tradition.

== Popular music ==
A number of popular Canadian Celtic rock bands are also influenced by Celtic folk traditions. The most important and influential such band was Vancouver's Spirit of the West, whose musical marriage of traditional Irish and Scottish jigs and reels with hard rock and Britpop influences paved the way for later acts such as Great Big Sea, Enter the Haggis, the Stoaters, Captain Tractor, the Mahones, Ashley MacIsaac, Jimmy George, Mudmen, Uisce Beatha, the Paperboys and the Clumsy Lovers.

Figgy Duff and the Rankin Family served much the same role in pop music, influencing later artists such as Leahy, Mary Jane Lamond, the Barra MacNeils and Natalie MacMaster. Loreena McKennitt fuses Celtic, world, and new-age music.

== See also ==
- Canadian fiddle
- Canadian folk music
- Music of Canada
- Irish-Canadian
- Canadian Gaelic
- Scottish-Canadian
- Scots-Quebecer

External Links: Celtic Music Base
