= Celtic music in the United States =

Celtic music
Asturias
Brittany
Cornwall
Galicia
Ireland
Isle of Man
Scotland
Wales
Celtic US
Celtic Canada

Irish, Scottish and Welsh music have been a part of American music dating back to the 18th century colonial era, when many Irish immigrants arrived. These included many Scots-Irish Presbyterians, whose music was most "closely related to a Lowland Scottish style". Beginning in the 1960s, performers like the Clancy Brothers achieved fame in the Irish music scene.

An impact of Celtic music on American styles is the evolution of country music, a style which blends Anglo-Celtic traditions with "sacred hymns and African American spirituals". Country music's roots come from "Americanized interpretations of English, Scottish and Scots-Irish traditional music, shaped by containing vestiges of (19th century) popular song, especially (minstrel songs)".

Celtic-Americans have also been influential in the creation of Celtic fusion, a set of genres which combine traditional Celtic music with contemporary influences.

== Traditional music in the US ==
Irish traditional music in the United States has a long and varied history, both in recording culture and by live performances. Emigrants from Ireland have brought their instruments and repertoire to the United States since the earliest days of European colonization of the New World.

The history of Irish musicians from Ireland taking up residency in New York and beyond is one side of the story. Another is the learning and playing of Irish music by first and second generation Irish-Americans. And then yet another is the widespread interest in the music by Americans from every background.

Masters of the tradition have come to live in the United States. Chief O'Neill in Chicago was a major promoter of musicianship and tune collection, greatly impacting the tradition beyond his own day and place of re-settlement. In the late nineteenth century and long after that, Patsy Touhey from Loughrea was a popular touring artist.

In the 1920s and 1930s, the classic recordings of Irish traditional music were made in New York by Michael Coleman, Packie Dolan, Hughie Gillespie, Jim Morrison and many others. This recording culture continues to the present day.

In the wake of the Depression and World War, Irish traditional music in New York was belittled by showband culture, and performers like Jack Coen, Paddy O'Brien of Tipperary, Larry Redican, and Paddy Reynolds kept the tradition alive in the United States, and were teachers of the music to Irish Americans.

Many Irish American performers like Andy McGann, Brian Conway, Joannie Madden, Jerry O'Sullivan, Liz Carroll and Billy McComiskey would rise to achieve a level of accomplishment in traditional Irish music.

Later Irish emigration to New York and beyond by James Keane, Mick Moloney, Paddy Keenan, Paddy O'Brien of Offaly, Martin Hayes and others through the 1960s, 1970s and 80s, ensured the music performed in America stayed connected to Ireland.

The tradition is continued through recent emigration, such as by Irish musicians Ivan Goff and Cillian Vallely, as well as many Irish American players like Patrick Mangan.

Many Welsh songs have been adopted into American music culture, such as "Ar Hyd y Nos" ("All Through the Night", performed by Sheryl Crow, among others); "Suo Gân" (featured in the film Empire of the Sun), and "Lisa Lân" (featured in the film Crash).

== Irish American music ==
Irish immigrants created a large number of emigrant ballads once in the United States. These were usually "sad laments, steeped in nostalgia, and self-pity, and singing the praises... of their native soil while bitterly condemning the land of the stranger". These songs include famous songs like "Thousands Are Sailing to America" and "By the Hush", and "Shamrock Shore".

Francis O'Neill was a Chicago police chief who collected the single largest collection of Irish traditional music ever published. He was a flautist, fiddler and piper who was part of a vibrant Irish community in Chicago at the time, one that included some forty thousand people, including musicians from "all thirty-two counties of Ireland", according to Nicholas Carolan, who referred to O'Neill as "the greatest individual influence on the evolution of Irish traditional dance music in the twentieth century".

In the 1890s, Irish music entered a "golden age", centered on the vibrant scene in New York City. This produced legendary fiddlers like James Morrison and Michael Coleman, and a number of popular dance bands that played pop standards and dances like the foxtrot and quicksteps; these bands slowly grew larger, adding brass and reed instruments in a big band style. Though this golden age ended with the Great Depression, the 1950s saw a resurgence of Irish music, aided by the foundation of the City Center Ballroom in New York City. It was later joined by a roots revival in Ireland and the foundation of Mick Moloney's Green Fields of America, a Philadelphia-based organization that promotes Irish music.

During the late 20th century came the rise of Celtic inspired rock groups like Flogging Molly and The Shillaly Brothers from Los Angeles, Black 47 from New York City, and the Dropkick Murphys from Boston.

== Celtic identity through music In America ==
Dynamic identities contribute to Benedict Anderson’s notions of nationalism and nationality. The Celtic identities constructed in America contribute to the dynamic being of American nationalism that we are founded upon. Freedom, a foundational principle of American society, was encouraged by the Celtic influence in Appalachia through their contribution to Union forces during the Civil War. The Union was a more democratizing entity and more willing to accept pluralism in American society compared to their Confederate counterparts who were more bent on maintaining a separatist identity

According to Benedict Anderson, “nationality” was formed from the accumulation of cultural artifacts that were able to be transplanted to an array of environments and societies and merge with a wide variety of political and ideological frameworks. This imagined nationality as Benedict calls it, is a constantly shifting and dynamic entity. “It is imagined because the members of even the smallest nation will never know most of their fellow members, yet in the mind of each lives the image of their communion.” (Anderson, 6). Celtic identity is one such imagined community. The diaspora of Celts from other areas of the world to America is representative of the imagined community.

The cultural diaspora from the British Isles, specifically Scotland and Ireland, landed primarily in the Appalachian region of the United States. Thousands of immigrants sailed and maintained and improved on agricultural pursuits to better improve their lives. The British brought with them cultural elements such as music, dress, and ideology. Among these Brits were those defined as Celts, or people who resided in or spoke the languages of Ireland, Wales, Scotland, or cornwall and Brittany. The Celtic identity is complex: A large portion of this Celticness rested on musical practices, both spoken word and instrumental, that constructs the distinct identity. Layered regional and national identities were assembled over time in the Celtic-speaking world, centered on practices of both modern and historic Celtic instruments.

American Bluegrass and Folk music styles have roots in Appalachian cultures linked to Scottish, Irish, or Celts. Layers of American identity were constructed by the influence of a new musical style. Culture was formed and community was created. Regional identity flourished. This concept of nation building in America is particularly true for the Scots and stems in part from the vast territory that led to development of family autonomy, or Clans, in Scotland and influenced the role of the individual. New layers of identity were created by the influx of Celts to America.

Identity is composed of characteristics and values that contribute to individuals and communities. Identities combine to form a distinct sense of nationalism.

Michael Dietler asserts that Celtic identity, which rose within Celtic speaking regions such as Scotland, Wales, Ireland, and Brittany, is itself an “imagined community” possessing its own nationalist ideals constructed from regional and individual cultural identities. The sense of nationalism that Celts possess is what Dietler refers to as Celticism, “self-conscious attempts to construct ethnicized forms of collective memory and communal identity that are territorially bounded and imbedded in overt political projects and ideologies.” (Dietler 239). He continues to define Celtitude as the feeling felt by those who draw ethnic ties to Celtic life. They feel a sense of ethno-nostalgia for Scottish or Irish heritage. Celticity is centered on a global spiritual connection to the idea of Celtic identity. This is composed of people who wish to identify as something other than white.

Dietler’s theories on identity suggest that music and cultural identities have overlapped. Celtic styles merge with other styles and move toward a role as “World Music”: many can relate to world music and Celtic styles create solidarity among those who wish to identify as Celtic.

== Samples ==
An Irish tune
Irish harmonica tune from the Library of Congress' California Gold: Northern California Folk Music from the Thirties Collection; performed by Aaron Morgan (harmonica) on July 17, 1939 in Columbia, California.

== Notes ==
1. Miller, Rebecca. "Irish Traditional and Popular Music in New York City: Identity and Social Change, 1930-1975", cited in Sawyers, pg. 225
2. Sawyers, pg. 229
3. Carolan, cited in Sawyers, pgs. 237-239
4. Sawyers, pgs. 242-243
5. Sawyers, pg. 247
6. Sawyers, pgs. 189-190
7. Sawyers, pg. 198
