= John Vesey (fiddler) =

- John Vesey Sligo Fiddler

Background information
- Born: John Francis Vesey; April 21, 1924; Ballincurry, County Sligo, Ireland
- Died: February 22, 1995 (aged 70) Philadelphia, Pennsylvania, U.S.
- Genre: Irish traditional music
- Occupations: Musician, bandleader, teacher
- Years active: circa 1940s–1980s
- Label: Shanachie

John Francis Vesey (April 21, 1924 – February 22, 1995) was an Irish traditional fiddler from Ballincurry (Baile an Churraigh), near Tubbercurry, County Sligo, Ireland. An exponent of the Sligo fiddle style, Vesey emigrated to the United States in 1949 and became involved in the Irish-American music community, particularly in Philadelphia. His playing, teaching and recordings contributed to the preservation and transmission of the Sligo tradition in North America.

== Early life and musical training ==
Vesey was born in rural south County Sligo in 1924. His father, John Vesey, a fiddler and craftsman who made several violins, gave him his first fiddle lesson, while his mother, Annie, a lilter, shared tunes with their son. Vesey began playing the fiddle at age twelve, having already absorbed much of the local repertoire. His first formal instruction came from his father, followed by training under master fiddler Michael Gorman, who taught him bowing, fingering, and ornamentation techniques foundational to the Sligo style. Gorman also introduced Vesey to music reading and stylistic elements such as triplets, rolls, and grace notes.

Vesey was influenced by 78 rpm recordings of Michael Coleman, Paddy Killoran, James Morrison, and Paddy Sweeney, which he purchased during turf-selling trips to Tubbercurry with his father.

== Time in England and emigration to America ==
Mike Flynn and John Vesey

Before emigrating to the United States, Vesey spent a formative period in England, particularly in the Camden Town area of London. During this time, he performed regularly with fellow Sligo musicians Michael Gorman and Mike Flynn. Contemporary accounts describe an active Irish music scene in the city during this period and Vesey's participation in local dance halls and Irish social clubs place him within that community of emigrant musicians.

After this period in England, Vesey emigrated to the United States in 1949, settling in the Germantown section of Philadelphia with relatives. He became involved in the local Irish music scene, performing with musicians such as Eddie Cahill (flute), Neil Docherty (fiddle), and Ed Reavy (fiddle and composer). Reavy, in particular, had a lasting impact on Vesey's repertoire and stylistic refinement. Vesey was also a guest on Irish radio programs, including on broadcasts on WTEL, where he performed with Austin Kelly, leader of the All‑Ireland Irish Orchestra.

Vesey played at Irish dances, house parties, weddings, and concerts across Philadelphia, New York, Boston, and Chicago. He led multiple céilí bands, including the John Vesey Céilí Band, and performed on Irish radio programs such as WTEL, WDAS and WXPN. His ensemble work often blended traditional Irish music with popular American styles, reflecting the hybrid demands of Irish-American audiences.

Paddy Killoran Traditional Irish Music Club (circa 1958)

A photograph, dated March 23, 1958, shows Vesey performing at the Paddy Killoran Traditional Irish Music Club in New York City, a common gathering place for Irish musicians.

Vesey frequently performed in trio settings with Canice Fahy (flute/vocals) and Thomas Standeven (uilleann pipes). This ensemble – billed in the Smithsonian's 1969 Festival of American Folklife program as the "John Vesey Ceilidh Band" – performed as part of the Pennsylvania program in Washington, D.C., in July 1969.

== Teaching ==
In 1957, Vesey began teaching fiddle, mentoring musicians in the bowing and fingering techniques characteristic of the Sligo style. He emphasized musical discipline and personal comportment, expecting students to uphold the dignity of traditional Irish music.

== Style and legacy ==
Reels: The Boys of Ballisodare Duke of Leinster - John Vesey/Eddie Cahill/Mick Moloney

Published descriptions of Vesey's playing characterize it as firmly rooted in the Sligo fiddle tradition, with strong rhythm, extensive ornamentation, and long-bow phrasing. For example, the liner notes to The First Month of Spring (Shanachie, 1977) highlight his use of triplets and rolls in the Coleman-Killoran style and note that his repertoire drew upon Sligo and Leitrim sources.

Andy McGann, Paddy Reynolds, John Vesey and Paul Brady at a gathering of Sligo-style and New York Irish Traditional musicians

His style evolved through exposure to other regional players but remained anchored in the Sligo tradition. Writers on Vesey's music highlight his interpretations of tunes such as "Up Sligo," "The Colliers Reel," and "The Merry Harriers". His commercial and archival recordings, particularly the 1977 LP The First Month of Spring with Paul Brady, and the 1998 double CD Sligo Fiddler compiled by Thomas Standeven Jr., have been described by folklorist and writer Stevenn Winick as "enormous historical value" to Irish-American traditional music. These recordings include field tapes, radio broadcasts, and home sessions.

Musicologist Miles Krassen identified Vesey, alongside Chicago fiddler Johnny McGreevy, as one of the two musicians who "probably best represent the Old Sligo style of fiddling" in the United States.

== Later life and recognition ==
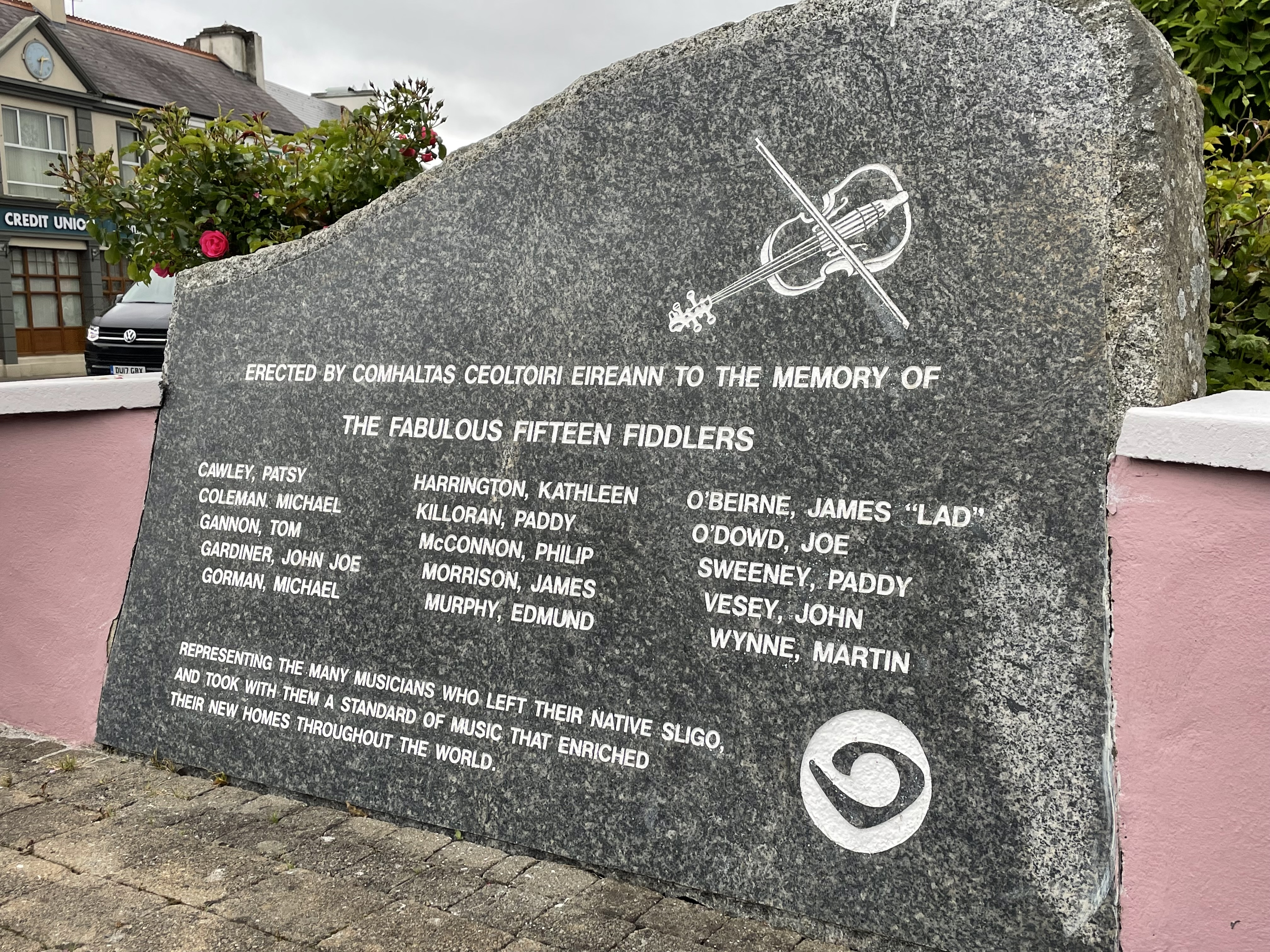
Fabulous Fifteen Fiddlers (Comhaltas Ceoltóirí Éireann) plaque in Tubbercurry, County Sligo

Vesey was married to Rose Marie Vesey, with whom he had seven children. He died in February 1995.

John Vesey is named on a plaque, erected by Comhaltas Ceoltóirí Éireann (CCÉ), commemorating the "Fabulous Fifteen Fiddlers" in Tubbercurry, County Sligo. He was also posthumously inducted into the CCÉ Mid-Atlantic Region's Hall of Fame in 2004.

== Selected discography ==
- The First Month of Spring. Shanachie Records (29006). 1977. Vinyl, LP Album. Magnagraphics Studio, N.Y.C.
- Irish Traditional Instrumental Music from the East Coat of America Volume 1. Rounder Records. 1987. Vinyl, LP Album.
- Sligo Fiddler. 1998. 2 CDs. Good Vibrations–RJR Digital. San Diego, CA
- Celtic Winds: Irish Music in America. Rounder Records. 1998. Compact Disc (CD9011). Irish Traditional Music
- Two Sligo Masters, Coleman Heritage Centre (CHC010). 2006. Reissue of two separate LPs. (2 CDs) The First Month of Spring (1977), Shanachie Records – with Paul Brady

== Field recordings and archives ==
Field recordings and interviews with John Vesey appear on reel-to-reel, acetate, CD and cassette in the Library of Congress, the Irish Traditional Music Archive's (ITMA), Smithsonian, Historical Society of Pennsylvania, and university folklife collections in Boston College, University of North Carolina and Villanova University. Repositories, which hold field recordings, interviews, photographs and related archival material for John Vesey, include:

- Boston College John J. Burns Library Repository; From the Collection: Comhaltas Ceoltóirí Éireann (Organization); 2 audio cassettes; Box: 8 (original media), Item: 10-11 (Audio). Identifier: IM-M104-2001.
- Boston College John J. Burns Library Repository; From the Collection: Joe Lamont Irish Music Recordings. Gene Kelly Tape: John Vesey, Joe Burke and Others, 1950s-19060. Collection Identifier: IM-M145-2005.
- Historical Society of Pennsylvania (1300 Locust Street, Philadelphia, PA 19107)
  - Hiteshew, Robin O'Brien. Robin O'Brien Hiteshew Collection (Philadelphia Ceili Group event recordings). Collection Number: 3059.
  - Philadelphia Ceili Group. Philadelphia Ceili Group Event Recordings. Collection Number: MSS074.
- Irish Traditional Music Archive, ITMA, (73 Merrion Square Dublin 2, Ireland)
  - Breandán Breathnach Collection. Reel-to-Reel 361 [sound recording] / [various performers] Sound Recording; CID: 54510; ITMA Reference: 1351-ITMA-REEL.
  - Marcas Ó Murchú. Tape 152. Domestic recording of music [sound recording] / John Vesey; Tom Standeven; CID: 237747; ITMA Reference: 12352-ITMA-CS
  - Dermot McLaughlin Collection. Irish traditional instrumental music, Volume 1. CID: 27348; ITMA Reference: 4681-CS
  - A Job of Journeywork: A Tribute to Larry Redican and His Musical Friends. Ciarán Mac Mathúna Introduces Irish Traditional Music from New York and Philadelphia 1962-1966. RTÉ radio traditional music archives. CID: 46348; ITMA Reference: 5872-CS/WAV.
  - Larry Redican Collection. Scope and content: Sound recordings. Reference code: LRE-277086
    - Reel of Bogey (The Tramp). John Vesey, Larry Redican, and Thomas Standeven. Recorded October 1962 at the Irish Center, Philadelphia by Ciarán Mac Mathúna.
  - RTÉ field recordings of Irish Traditional Music USA. Cassette master tape, side 2 [sound recording] / [various performers]. ITMA Reference: 11010-RTE-RR = CD-R 824 NIA.
  - Stephen Cummins Collection. Eight (8) transcription disc and eleven (11) 78 rpm discs recordings of John Vesey. Donated by Stephen Cummins.
- Library of Congress, American Folklife Center, Washington, D.C.
  - Robin O'Brien Hiteshew collection (AFC 1998/013), Archive of Folk Culture, American Folklife Center, Library of Congress, Washington, D.C
  - Alan Jabbour recordings of Jehile Kirkhuff and John Vesey (AFC 1970/044), Archive of Folk Culture, American Folklife Center, Library of Congress, Washington, D.C.
- New York University Tamiment Library and Robert F. Wagner Labor Archives
  - Mick Moloney Irish-American Music and Popular Culture Field Recordings, Recordings of John Vesey, Call Number AIA.031.002.
  - From Shore to Shore Records: Series I. Recordings, 1988-1999. New York Fleadh Cheoil, Manhattan College, Bronx, New York (1988). Call Number AIA.095 (Box: 6, Betacam: cuid44552. Material Type: Video)
- Smithsonian Center for Folklife and Cultural Heritage, Ralph Rinzler Folklife Archives and Collections, 600 Maryland Ave SW, Washington, D.C.
  - Ralph Rinzler Papers and Audio Recordings,1950-1994, Rinzler Fieldwork: John Vesey, Local Numbers: FP-RINZ-7RR-0648
  - Moses and Frances Asch Collection, 1926-1986, Local Numbers: FW-ASCH-7RR-2758: Irish Fiddle
  - 1969 Festival of American Folklife. John Vesey Ceilidh Band. Main Stage (Center of Mall) Sunday July 6, 1969. Collection ID: CFCH.SFF.1969.
- University of North Carolina at Chapel Hill, Wilson Library. Kevin Delaney Collection (John Vesey Trio. April 1974). Collection Number: 20035.
- Villanova University Falvey Library. Philadelphia Ceili Group and Robin O'Brien Hiteshew Collections.
