= John Vesey =

John Vesey may refer to:

- John Vesey (archbishop of Tuam) (1638–1716), Church of Ireland clergyman
- John Vesey, 1st Baron Knapton (died 1761), Anglo-Irish politician and peer
- John Vesey, 2nd Viscount de Vesci (1771–1855), Anglo-Irish politician and peer
- John Vesey, 4th Viscount de Vesci (1844–1903), Anglo-Irish peer and British Army officer
- John Vesey, 6th Viscount de Vesci (1919–1983)
- John Vesey (fiddler) (1924–1995), Irish musician
- John Vesey (bishop) (died 1554), bishop of Exeter
