= Stripling Brothers =

The Stripling Brothers
- Origin: Kennedy, Alabama, U.S.
- Genres: Old-time country music
- Years active: 1920s–1950s
- Labels: Vocalion, Decca
- Past members: Charlie Stripling; Ira Stripling

The Stripling Brothers were an American old-time country music duo, comprising fiddler Charlie Melvin Stripling (August 8, 1896–January 19, 1966) and his guitar-playing brother Ira Lee Stripling (June 5, 1898–March 11, 1967). They recorded in the late 1920s and 1930s. Charlie Stripling is regarded as "one of the most important American old-time fiddlers."

== Biography ==
The brothers were born in Pickens County, Alabama, among eight children of Thomas Newton Stripling and Sarah E. Robertson. Charlie acquired a fiddle in his teens, and learned tunes from a neighbor, "Plez" Carroll. His younger brother Ira bought a guitar to accompany him, and together the duo began to win local small-town fiddling competitions. Charlie Stripling married in 1919, settling in the town of Kennedy, and as a tenant farmer welcomed the cash income from winning competitions. He developed his skills "to a degree that few in the area could match", and the pair started to perform more widely.

In November 1928, the Brunswick-Balke-Collender Company, owner of Vocalion Records, set up a temporary recording studio at the Bankhead Hotel in Birmingham, Alabama, and invited local musicians to audition. The Stripling Brothers recorded two tunes, including "The Lost Child", which later formed the basis of the popular tune "Black Mountain Rag". The brothers also appeared on local radio station WAPI, and their popularity spread. Charlie Stripling began composing his own syncopated tunes or "ragtime breakdowns", often based on current pop songs, playing them at square dances in mining towns and elsewhere. In 1929, the brothers traveled to Chicago where they recorded ten further tunes for Vocalion, including two vocal recordings, "Weeping Willow" and "Railroad Bum".

The pair made further recordings for Decca Records in New York City in 1934. and for the same company in New Orleans in 1936. According to Burgin Mathews at Allmusic:

The sides they released reflect the rich (and otherwise un-recorded) fiddle traditions of their home in West Alabama; they also showcase the unique abilities of that area's most accomplished fiddler.... Their later recordings incorporated increasing pop influences, reflecting the evolution of dance styles and musical tastes. Though the Striplings may have asserted a mostly regional influence, the number of recordings they made -- on both sides of the Depression -- and the virtuosity of the playing attest to their stature as performers.

Charlie Stripling's wife died in 1934; he remarried, but his growing family, with nine children in all, meant that he could not afford time away from his farm. Similarly, Ira could no longer afford to pay for an employee to cover his absences from work. Their recording career ended, though Charlie continued to play locally, `often accompanied by two of his sons, Robert Clifton Stripling and Lee Edwin Stripling. After his sons left during World War II, Charlie Stripling formed a band that played for large dances in the region. His health began to fail in the 1950s, and he died in 1966, aged 69. Ira Stripling died the following year, aged 68.

In 1971, a collection of the Stripling Brothers' recordings was issued by County Records. The duo's complete recorded works were issued by Document Records in 1997.
