= Jerry Holland (musician) =

Canadian musician (1955–2009)

- Born: February 23, 1955; Brockton, Massachusetts
- Died: July 16, 2009 (aged 54) North Sydney, Nova Scotia
- Occupations: Musician, fiddler
- Instrument: Fiddle

Jerry Holland (February 23, 1955 – July 16, 2009) was a musician and fiddler who lived on Cape Breton Island in Nova Scotia, Canada.

He was born in Brockton, Massachusetts, United States to Canadian parents – his father was from New Brunswick and his mother was from Quebec. During his childhood, Holland was exposed to the music of the large Cape Breton expatriate community in Boston. He began to play the fiddle and step-dance at the age of five, and played at his first square dance at the age of six. He made his television debut in 1962 on the Canadian program Don Messer's Jubilee. By the time he was ten years old, he was playing regularly at dances in the Boston area. Holland's family made annual summer trips to Cape Breton, and he moved there permanently in 1975.

In his early 20s, Holland performed with the Cape Breton Symphony, a group of fiddlers that included Winston "Scotty" Fitzgerald, Angus Chisholm, Joe Cormier, Wilfred Gillis and John Donald Cameron. The group appeared regularly on CBC television on The John Allan Cameron Show and other programs. From playing with these much older and more experienced musicians, Holland gained an appreciation for the traditional style of Cape Breton fiddle music, as well as a repertoire of over a thousand fiddle tunes.

Holland released his first, self-titled album in 1976. It was his second album, Master Cape Breton Fiddler (1982, re-released on CD in 2001), that made his reputation as a ground-breaking musician. Accompanied by Dave MacIsaac on guitar and Hilda Chiasson on piano, Holland pioneered a new, more modern sound for Cape Breton music on this album, while still remaining firmly within the Cape Breton tradition. Master Cape Breton Fiddler was a major influence on younger Cape Breton fiddlers such as Howie MacDonald and Kinnon Beaton.

Holland released thirteen albums and appeared as a guest musician on over 25 more. He published two collections of fiddle tunes: Jerry Holland's Collection of Fiddle Tunes and Jerry Holland's Second Collection of Fiddle Tunes, both edited by Paul Cranford. He was also noted as a composer of fiddle tunes, most famously "Brenda Stubbert's Reel" (named for his friend and fellow Cape Breton fiddler Brenda Stubbert) and "My Cape Breton Home".

Holland died on July 16, 2009, from cancer.

== Discography ==
- Jerry Holland (1976)
- Master Cape Breton Fiddler (1982)
- Lively Steps (1987)
- Jerry Holland Solo (1988)
- The New Fiddle (1990)
- A Session With Jerry Holland (1990)
- Fathers and Sons (1992)
- The Fiddlesticks Collection (1995)
- Fiddler's Choice (1998)
- Crystal Clear (2000)
- Parlor Music (2005)
- Helping Hands (2009)
- Jerry Holland and Friends (2010)
