= Sandy MacIntyre =

Canadian musical artist (1935–2021)

- Born: Hugh Alexander MacIntyre; 1935; Inverness, Nova Scotia, Canada
- Died: November 24, 2021 (aged 86)
- Occupation: Fiddler
- Instrument: Violin

Hugh Alexander “Sandy” MacIntyre (1935–2021) was one of the most respected artists in the tradition of Cape Breton fiddle music.

== Early life ==
Sandy was born into a family of musicians in Inverness, Cape Breton Island, Nova Scotia, Canada on April 17, 1935. His father Ronald and mother Cassie were both Scottish fiddlers. Cassie had long been considered one of the liveliest square dance fiddlers in the county. Sandy was one of fourteen children, most of whom played musical instruments. He started playing the pump organ at age 8 or 9 chording for family members and visiting fiddlers. At about age 16 he took up the fiddle, learning by ear. He also learned the guitar and in high school he was a drummer in the Inverness Pipe Band.

== Career ==
Sandy moved to Toronto as a young man and took the music with him. He is personally responsible for creating a Cape Breton scene there. He linked up with other exiled Cape Bretoners to bring musicians to Toronto for Cape Breton style dances and to keep the music alive. Some of his guest appearances included the Mariposa Folk Festival at Toronto in 1971 and 1972 where he represented Cape Breton fiddlers. He performed at, and managed, the Scottish Talent Club in Toronto for approximately eight years. He has traveled extensively in Canada and the United States, and has made trips to Scotland as well as the Shetland and Orkney Islands doing fiddle workshops and concerts. He appeared for five years on the CBC National TV show “Ceilidh” from Halifax with other artists such as Winnie Chafe, Buddy MacMaster, John Campbell, Cameron Chisholm, and Doug MacPhee. Sandy was a member of the Cape Breton Symphony Fiddlers for many years, and performed on the John Allan Cameron CTV show with symphony director Bobby Brown, Buddy MacMaster, John Donald Cameron and Wilfred Gillis. Sandy made two trips to the Northwest Territories, where he taught fiddle and step dancing to many Native American and Inuit children under the auspices of the “Strings Across The Sky” program arranged by Toronto Symphony violinist Andrea Hansen. Sandy was an instructor at the Cape Breton Fiddling School at the Gaelic College in St. Ann's Bay for many years and successfully expanded the interest in that program to students from around the world. Sandy's efforts in raising funds for the college through benefit concerts and his assistance to so many students was recognized by the Board of Governors of the college in 1995. Sandy was a feature artist on “Bridging Canada”, a simultaneous series of concerts held in October, 1996 on famous bridges from Vancouver to Montreal to foster and celebrate Canadian unity. Sandy performed on the famous Bloor Viaduct in Toronto. Sandy was one of the feature artists in the Mirvish production of “Needfire”, a Celtic musical, from 1998 – 2000 at the Royal Alexandra Theatre and the Princess of Wales Theatre in Toronto. He displayed the unique and traditional style of Cape Breton fiddling during numerous stage appearances throughout the show. Sandy has been a feature performer for many years at the Celtic Colours International Festival in Cape Breton. In 2009, the festival paid tribute to Sandy, to thank him for all he has done to preserve the music. His Toronto family band Steeped in Tradition , joined him for this concert in the beautiful St. Matthew's Church in his beloved Inverness. At Sandy's request, he was joined by some of his "teacher's pets", former students Jeff Gosse, Colin Grant , Kimberley Fraser and Dawn & Margie Beaton .

Sandy worked as a manager at Air Canada until he retired after twenty-five years in 1983. He sold real estate in Scarborough until 1995. He continued to run fiddle classes in Toronto and taught Cape Breton step dancing. He is a prolific composer with over a hundred tunes to his credit, many in active circulation among Cape Breton players.

== Personal life ==
Sandy married the former Lucy LeBlanc of Margaree Forks, Inverness County. They have two children, Brian, a guitarist, and Stephen, a bodhran player. He died on November 24, 2021.

== Recordings ==
- Let’s Have a Ceilidh with Sandy MacIntyre
- Cape Breton....My Land In Music
- Island Treasure Vol. 1
- Cape Breton Fiddle Music: Steeped In Tradition
- Steeped and Served: The Sandy MacIntyre Collection (2 CD Compilation)

Cape Breton Traditional Style Fiddle Sets with Guitar Tablature by Sandy MacIntyre and Leigh Cline

This book is a definitive documentation of Cape Breton-style fiddle music. Techniques specific to the style are touched on and many sets (groups of tunes - listening tunes, dance tunes, or a combination thereof - performed in a specific order) are included. Presented are the melodies, chords, and guitar tablature. 120 pages.

== Honours ==
A number of fiddlers have composed tunes in Sandy's honour: Sandy MacIntyre's Trip to Boston (composed by John Campbell); Sandy MacIntyre's (composed by Brenda Stubbert); Sandy MacIntyre's March (composed by Donald Angus Beaton). In 2021, The Gaelic College took time to honour Sandy MacIntyre. Additionally, the Board of Governors acknowledged Sandy with the title of Honorary Governor.
