= Jean Carignan =

Canadian fiddler (1916–1988)

- Carignan playing the fiddle

Background information
- Born: December 7, 1916; Lévis, Quebec
- Died: February 16, 1988 (aged 71) Delson, Quebec
- Instrument: Fiddle

Jean Carignan, CM (December 7, 1916 – February 16, 1988) was a Canadian fiddler from Quebec.

Carignan was born in Lévis, Quebec, on December 7, 1916, later moving to Sherbrooke and then Trois-Rivières with his family; the family moved to Montreal when Carignan was ten years old. As a child, Carignan studied with noted Quebec fiddler Joseph Allard, as well as learning the music of the great Irish fiddlers Michael Coleman and James Morrison and the Scottish fiddler James Scott Skinner. In his mid-teens Carignan joined George Wade and his Cornhuskers. Carignan was a friend of famous violinist and conductor Yehudi Menuhin. In 1974, he was made a Member of the Order of Canada as "the greatest fiddler in North America". He died in Montreal on February 16, 1988, at the age of 71.

In 1976, The Folk Music Sourcebook (Sandberg and Weissman) wrote about Carignan : "Carignan's technique is amazing, but more so the joy and energy with which he applies it. There are few players in any music who reach his degree of virtuosity without sacrificing feeling or originality"—p. 84. As a fiddler, he was always aiming for the strictest authenticity in his executions, displaying an attitude of absolute rigor when playing his repertoire of 7,000 pieces learned from Coleman, Skinner, Allard, Wellie Ringuette and many others.

== Selected discography ==
- 1959: Ti-Jean. . . Le Violoneux (Disques London Série Française)
- 1960: The Folk Fiddler Who Electrified the Newport Folk Festival (Elektra Records)
- 1960: Old Time Fiddle Tunes played by Jean Carignan (Folkways Records)
- 1961: Alan Mills and Jean Carignan: Songs, Fiddle Tunes and a Folk-Tale from Canada (Folkways)
- 1973: Jean Carignan (Philo)
- 1975: French Canadian Fiddle Songs (Legacy – an Elektra/Everest Production)
- 1976: Jean Carignan rend hommage à Joseph Allard (Philo)
- 1977: Jean Carignan Plays the Music of – Joue la Musique de Coleman, Morrison & Skinner (Philo)
- 1987: Gigue à Deux (Radio Canada International)
- 2006: Classic Canadian Songs from Smithsonian Folkways (Smithsonian Folkways)

== Selected filmography ==
- 1975 featured in La veillée des veillées, NFB film documenting the Veillées d'automne folk festival at UQAM
- 1986 Featured in TV series, Down Home for Channel Four TV made by Pelicula Films, Glasgow
- 1996 Featured in A Musical Journey- The Films of Pete, Toshi and Dan Seeger 1957-1964, 1996, Distributed by Rounders Records.

== Honours and awards ==
- 1974: Member of the Order of Canada.
- 1976: Recipient of the Calixa-Lavallée Award.
- 1977: Honorary D.Mus (McGill University).
- 1977: Honorary D.Mus. (University of Toronto).
- 2002: Plaque on the Canadian Folk Music Walk of Fame in Ottawa.
