= Andy McGann =

- Born: October 5, 1928; Harlem, New York City, United States
- Died: July 13, 2004 (75 years)
- Years active: 1935–2004
- Formerly of: Paddy Reynolds

Andy McGann (October 5, 1928 – July 13, 2004) was an Irish-American fiddle player and a celebrated exponent of Sligo-style fiddling. He was born in New York to immigrant parents from County Sligo, living first in west Harlem before moving as a child to Mott Haven in the Bronx. McGann received violin instruction from Catherine Brennan Grant, a teacher grounded in both classical and Irish traditional music, and played in parochial school orchestras. He also got informal instruction and encouragement from County Sligo fiddler Michael Coleman, who was a friend of the family. At a very young age, McGann found a place among the elite of New York's Sligo-style fiddle players, including Coleman, Paddy Killoran, Martin Wynne, Louis Quinn and James "Lad" O'Beirne. In the 1950s, McGann formed a partnership with Longford-born fiddler Paddy Reynolds. With Reynolds and others, McGann played with The New York Céilí Band, an all-star group that traveled to Ireland in 1960 to compete at the All-Ireland fleadh cheoil in Boyle, County Roscommon.

McGann's first studio recording was the 1965 LP A Tribute to Michael Coleman with button accordionist Joe Burke and piano accompanist Felix Dolan. When Shanachie Records was established in the 1970s, McGann released a solo recording and a duet album with Paddy Reynolds – both with guitar backing from Paul Brady – as well as The Funny Reel, a reunion LP with Burke and Dolan.

== Discography ==
- 1965 A Tribute to Michael Coleman (Shaskeen) (reissued Green Linnet 1994)
- 1976 Andy McGann & Paddy Reynolds (Shanachie)
- 1977 It's a Hard Road to Travel (Shanachie)
- 1979 The Funny Reel – Traditional Music of Ireland (Shanachie)
