= Sixto Palavecino =

Argentine musician

- Birth name: Sixto Doroteo Palavecino
- Born: March 31, 1915; Barrancas, Salavina, Santiago del Estero, Argentina
- Died: April 24, 2009 (aged 94); Santiago del Estero, Santiago del Estero, Argentina
- Occupation(s): Poet, musician, singer
- Instrument: Violin

Sixto Doroteo Palavecino (March 31, 1915 – April 24, 2009) was a poet, musician and singer of Argentine folk music, who started playing the violin when he was 10-years old.

Palavecino was influential as a player, a compiler of folk traditions, and in sustaining the Santiago Quechua language through his music and the radio program "Alero Quechua Santiagueño" which he presented for many years with his son Rubén.

Palavecino enjoyed wide recognition from colleagues and audiences throughout Argentina since the 1980s. In the years before that, he also worked as a barber to make ends meet.

He died in the city of Santiago del Estero, where he was hospitalized due to a severe pneumonia.
