= Julie Lyonn Lieberman =

American composer

- Born: July 16, 1954; Newark, New Jersey
- Genres: classical music
- Occupation(s): author, composer, producer, and performing artist

Julie Lyonn Lieberman is an American improvising violinist, vocalist, composer, author, educator, and recording artist specializing in fiddle and international violin styles. She is among the first to teach improvisation and world music at the Juilliard School. She also created the first eclectic styles teacher training program in the world as artistic director for the summer program, Strings Without Boundaries. Ms. Lieberman is an author, composer, producer, and performing artist.

== Early life ==
Julie Lyonn Lieberman was born in Newark, New Jersey and began her formal education on violin studying with famed educator and author, Samuel Applebaum. She continued her classical violin studies with Nancy Clarke of the Curtis Institute; Romuald Tecco of the Galamian School; Bill Henry, the co-founder of Orpheus Ensemble; and Stanley Ritchie, then concertmaster of the New York City Opera Orchestra and first violinist of the Philadelphia String Quartet. During this time she also became involved in roots music through family members who helped found the Folk Society of Northern New Jersey and who were involved with booking international groups such as The Boys of the Lough. She attended Sarah Lawrence College and earned her Graduate Degree from New York University's Gallatin Division, where she became an adviser for ten years.

== Career ==
After graduating she toured with her trio, Nightsong, worked with string teachers and students in residencies across the country, and became the composer-in-residence for the feminist theatre company, Emmatroupe. Its writers and supporters included Kate Millet, and Gloria Steinem, among others. Around this time, her work as a composer caught the interest of Leonardo Shapiro. Together they created “The Yellow House”, a play on the life of Van Gogh which was performed at La Mama in New York City and at Theatre of Nations in Baltimore.

In the late 1970s and 1980s, her first three of thirteen books were published; she wrote and produced a National Public Radio series called The Talking Violin detailing the history of violin music in America and narrated by Billy Taylor; created her first three recordings of original music (see discography), performed on Broadway in M. Butterfly and in venues such as Omega Institute, New York Open Center, Brooklyn Academy of Music, Carnegie Hall, and in colleges and clubs throughout America. She also produced three jazz string summits featuring many of the top improvising string players in America (Symphony Space 1984, St. Peter's Church 1986, and New York University 1988), and co-produced a radio show, “Hear and Now” with Cynthia Bell on WBAI for four years. In the early 1990s, Julie Lyonn Lieberman and Steve Rathe of Murray Street Productions, wrote and produced a two-part series for the National Public Radio series, Jazz Profiles, titled “Jazz Violin” and hosted by Nancy Wilson.

From the 1990s up through present day, Lieberman has been extremely active in the field of education. She worked as a consultant to National Young Audiences for several years, and went on to develop a jazz string curriculum for The Associated Board of the Royal Schools of Music, followed by a creative curriculum for American String Teachers Association's national curriculum book, “Curriculum for School String Programs K-12.” She has taught master classes for Music Educators Conference state conferences, American String Teachers Association's state conferences, for The Academy, a program of Carnegie, Weill Hall, and Juilliard, as well as residencies in schools throughout the United States. She has also authored over fifty articles for music magazines, including STRAD Magazine, STRINGS Magazine, Fiddler Magazine, School Band and Orchestra, and American String Teacher Journal, and Downbeat.

In 2003, 2004 and 2005 she co-produced three alternative styles string festivals within American String Teachers national conferences, serving as the chair for the 2004 component. In 2007, she wrote and produced the DVD, Alternative String Styles in the Classroom, for American String Teachers Association and NAMM. As a D’Addario Elite Clinician since 1999, she has created over a dozen instructional videos. In 2008 she taught at Django in June at Smith College. In 2009 the National Association for Music Education included Lieberman's Green Anthem as part of its suggested curriculum, reaching six million children. The "Green Anthem", the world's largest concert.The mission of the Green Anthem Project was to promote musicianship, creativity and leadership, while benefiting the environment.

Ms. Lieberman created a series of projects, including thirty concerts nationwide, in tribute to the children murdered in her town, Newtown, in 2003. She co-created and was artistic director for a summer program, Strings Without Boundaries since 2003.

== Special awards and honors ==
Lieberman is the recipient of well over two dozen ASCAP awards and eight Meet the Composer awards. She won “Honorary Mention” for the video, “Improvising Violin: Four Personal Views, featuring Leroy Jenkins, John Blake, Jr., Billy Bang, and herself, which she helped write, direct, and moderate. She has been awarded four Citations for Merit from American String Teachers Association as well as the American String Teachers Association's 2014 KUDOS Award.

== Discography ==
- 1981 Empathic Connections, Julie Lyonn Music
- 1983 Arcturus, Julie Lyonn Music
- 1991 The Roaring Brook Fiddler, Julie Lyonn Music
- 1995 Mixing America, Julie Lyonn Music
- 2002 Soundtrack (composed and performed) for the Taoist exercise video Body Logos

Note: She was also a guest artist on Laura Nyro's final album before Nyro's untimely death, Mother's Spiritual, 1984, designing her own violin lines for the album.

== Bibliography ==
- Techniques for the Contemporary String Player (DVD) 1993.
- You Are Your Instrument (book). Newtown, CT: Huiksi Music/Julie Lyonn Music, 1993.
- The Violin in Motion (DVD). Huiksi Music/Julie Lyonn Music, 1994.
- Improvising Violin (Book). Newtown, CT: Huiksi Music/Julie Lyonn Music, 1997.
- The Contemporary Violinist (Book and DVD). Newtown, CT: Huiksi Music/Julie Lyonn Music, 1999.
- Rockin’ Out With the Blues Fiddle (Book and DVD). Newtown, CT: Huiksi Music/Julie Lyonn Music, 2000.
- The Creative Band and Orchestra (Book). Newtown, CT: Huiksi Music/Julie Lyonn Music, 2002.
- Alternative Strings: The New Curriculum. Pompton Plains, NJ: Amadeus Press, 2004.
- Rhythmizing the Bow (DVD) 2004
- Planet Musician: The World Music Sourcebook for Musicians (Book and DVD). Milwaukee, WI
- Vocal Aerobics (DVD). Huiksi Music/Julie Lyonn Music, 2009.
- Violin & Viola Ergonomics: Determine the optimum playing position and support for your body type (DVD), 2010.
- How to Play Contemporary Strings (Book with video tutorials), Hal Leonard, 2016
- Twelve-Key Practice: The Path to Mastery & Individuality (Book). Julie Lyonn Music. Worthington, MA, 2018
- A Festival of Violin & Fiddle Styles (3 Books for violin, viola and cello with video tutorials and backing tracks). MA: Hal Leonard 2019
- 12 Rock Strings Lesson Plans (PDF with backing tracks). MA: Julie Lyonn Music 2020
- Electric Spice. (video tutorials) MyTalentForge, 2020
- The Roaring Brook Fiddler: Creative Life on the Wings of an Empath. (in-print and epub memoir). MA: Julie Lyonn Music, 2020
- The Roaring Brook Fiddler: Creative Life on the Wings of an Empath. (audio-book with original music). MA: Julie Lyonn Music, 2021

== Compositions ==
String Orchestra Scores (Alfred Music):

- Midnight's Celtic Run
- Folk Dance From Provence
- Lebedike Honga (A Lively Honga) Traditional / arr.
- Rockin’ It
- Hotter Than Blues
- Twin Sisters Traditional / arr.
- Flop-Eared Mule Traditional / arr.
- Blues Fiddle on the Fringe
- Terkisher Klezmer Fest / arr.
- Newtown Peace Anthem
- Mason's Apron

String Orchestra Scores (Kendor Music):

- French Roast Traditional / arr. J.W. Pepper Editor's Choice
- Butterfly Traditional / arr.
- Bollywood Strings (JR)
- Bollywood Strings (SR)
- Klezmer Celebration (JR)
- Klezmer Celebration (SR)
- TechnoStrings
- A Cinematic Journey
