= Posey Rorer =

American musician (1891–1936)

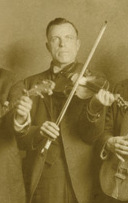
Rorer with the North Carolina Ramblers, circa 1923

Posey Rorer (September 22, 1891 – June 6, 1936) was an American old-time fiddler who was best known for being a member of the string band Charlie Poole and the North Carolina Ramblers.

== Biography ==
Rorer was born in Franklin County, Virginia. He suffered from severely clubbed feet for the first 30 years of his life. At the age of 10 he learned to play the banjo but soon switched to the fiddle. In 1917, he moved to West Virginia but due to the flu epidemic of 1919, he had to return to Virginia. Rorer had become close friends with Charlie Poole and together they performed all over North Carolina in the 1920s. In 1925, Rorer together with Charlie Poole and Norman Woodlieff formed the North Carolina Ramblers. They went to New York to record for Columbia Records. They made their recording debut on July 27, 1925. When Norman Woodlieff left the band in 1926 he was replaced by Roy Harvey. Between September 1926 and February 1928, the band was often led by Harvey during recording sessions since Charlie Poole was not present. In 1928, Rorer left the North Carolina Ramblers over some disagreements concerning record royalties. He was quickly replaced by Lonnie Austin.

Rorer joined the duo of Walter Smith and Norman Woodlieff recording for Gennett Records in March 1929. In March 1930, he recorded with Buster Carter and Lewis McDaniel alternately calling themselves the Carolina Buddies or the Dixie Ramblers. Later in 1930, Rorer and Carter teamed up with Preston Young and formed a trio using the North Carolina Ramblers as a model. They went to New York for an audition. They made their first recordings in June 1931 cutting 10 songs. Although Rorer continued to make recordings with different bands, The Great Depression finally forced him to retire from music. He began working as a woodcutter and in 1936 for the Works Progress Administration. He died in June 1936 of a heart attack.
