= Uisce Beatha (band) =

Canadian folk rock band

Uisce Beatha / Red
- Origin: London, Ontario, Canada
- Genre: Folk rock
- Years active: 1990s
- Past members: Alan Glen; John Glen; Paul Meadows; Damian Morrissy; Doug Watt; Marty Coles; Mark Gosine; Patrick McLaughlin

Uisce Beatha was a 1990s Canadian folk rock band based initially in London, Ontario and after 1993 in Halifax, Nova Scotia. The band took its name from the Irish name for whisky, meaning water of life. Their music ranged from Celtic to punk.

== History ==
Uisce Beatha formed in 1988 in London, with members Alan Glen on lead vocals and banjo, John Glen on mandolin and tin whistle, Paul Meadows on fiddle and harp, Damian Morrissy on bass guitar, Doug Watt on guitar and Marty Coles on drums. Morrissy stepped down to start a family. Mark Gosine stepped in to fill his role. Coles was later replaced by Patrick McLaughlin.

The band released two albums and two EPs as Uisce Beatha, including Voice of the Voyager in 1994. They toured regularly in both Canada and Germany.

=== Change of name ===
They were sued in 1997 by a Scottish distillery over rights to the band name, and subsequently changed their name to Red. They released one further album under that name, The Fabulous Mushman, on which their style changed from mainly Celtic to more pop music, but subsequently broke up.

== Discography ==
=== Albums ===
As Uisce Beatha

- 1991 – Drinking with the Lord (EP) (Independently released)
- 1992 – The Mystic of the Baja (Independently released in Canada; German release on Old Songs New Songs)
- 1994 – Voice of the Voyager (Atlantica Music)
- 1995 – Living in a Cuckoo Clock (EP) (Independently released)

As Red

- 1998 – The Fantabulous Mushman (No Records)
