= Ceilidh (TV program) =

- Genre: Music
- Presented by: Alasdair Gillies
- Country of origin: Canada
- Original language: English
- No. of seasons: 1

Production
- Production location: Halifax, Nova Scotia
- Running time: 30 minutes

Original release
- Network: CBC Television
- Release: 1973 – 1974

Ceilidh /ˈkeɪli/ is a Canadian music television program that aired on CBC Television in 1973 and 1974.

== Premise ==
This program began as a local 13-episode production which was broadcast locally in mid-1973 and hosted by John Allan Cameron. Its title (céilidh) is a Gaelic word meaning a social gathering based on dancing and music.

In 1974, the program was produced in Halifax for CBC's national network. Cameron was replaced by Alasdair Gillies who joined series regulars the Cape Breton Fiddlers and the Ceilidh Dancers.

== Scheduling ==
This half-hour program was broadcast on the CBC network Thursdays at 8:30 p.m. (Eastern) from 16 May 1974.
