= Angus Chisholm =

Canadian musician (1908–1979)

- Born: 12 December 1908; Margaree Forks, Nova Scotia, Canada
- Died: 24 March 1979 (aged 70) Cambridge, Massachusetts, USA
- Occupation: Cape Breton fiddler

Angus Chisholm (12 December 1908 – 24 March 1979) was a Canadian Cape Breton fiddler.

Chisholm was one of the first fiddlers from the island to record a commercially available album. Decca released the recording 14004 on November 18, 1934: Rothermarches Rant, Braes of Auchertyre, Moonlight Clog & Hennessey Hornpipes.

He was regarded as one of the world's best Celtic fiddlers. He performed on the John Allan Cameron show with the Cape Breton Symphony, a group of fiddlers that included Winston "Scotty" Fitzgerald, Jerry Holland, Joe Cormier, Wilfred Gillis and John Donald Cameron. The group appeared regularly on CBC television on The John Allan Cameron Show and other programs.

Chisholm was born in Margaree Forks, Cape Breton, Nova Scotia in 1908. He was the son of Archie Chisholm and Isabel MacLennan. His ancestor, also named Archibald Chisholm, emigrated from Strathglass, Scotland, to Nova Scotia in 1809. Alexander W. Chisholm, M.P., was his uncle. He died in 1979 in Cambridge, Massachusetts, and was laid to rest in Margaree. His early recordings have now been released on tape.
