= Bob Holt (fiddler) =

American fiddler

- Born: November 25, 1930; Ava, Missouri
- Died: March 19, 2004 (aged 73); Ava, Missouri
- Genres: Old-time music
- Occupation: Musician
- Instrument: Fiddle
- Years active: 1947–2004
- Labels: Rounder

Bob Holt was an American fiddler, playing old-time and for square dances. He was known for his lightning-fast, energetic style of playing. He played his signature song "Ninth of January" at as much as 144 beats per minute while playing for dances. He was born on November 25, 1930, in Ava, Douglas County, Missouri. He died March 19, 2004, in Ava.

Holt was a recipient of a 1999 National Heritage Fellowship in the amount of $10,000 from the National Endowment for the Arts, which is the United States' highest honor in the folk and traditional arts.

== Recordings ==
- Rabbit in the Pea Patch (cassette tape)
- The Way I Heard It (cassette tape)
- Got a Little Home to Go To Rounder, 1998 CD 0432

He appears on:

- Jump Fingers, a tape by the Childgrove Country Dancers.
- Face the Creek, a CD produced by the Childgrove Country Dancers.
- Traditional Fiddle Music of the Ozarks: Volume I: Along the Eastern Crescent, Rounder, 1999 (CDROUN0435 / 018964443528)
- North American Traditions: The Art of Traditional Fiddle Rounder, 1999
