= Clark Kessinger =

- Born: July 27, 1896; Kanawha County, West Virginia US
- Died: June 4, 1975 (aged 78)
- Genres: Old time
- Occupation: Musician
- Instrument(s): Fiddle, banjo

Clark Kessinger (July 27, 1896 – June 4, 1975) was an American old-time fiddler. Many of his fiddle tunes made their way to other fiddlers or into the bluegrass music genre.

== Biography ==
Kessinger was born in South Hills, Kanawha County, West Virginia, United States, and was raised in nearby Lincoln County. At least two of his relatives were fiddlers and he also listened to local fiddlers but his biggest influence was Ed Haley. Kessinger began playing the banjo when he was five years old and two years later he performed at local saloons with his father. He switched to fiddle and began performing at country dances. In 1917, he joined the Navy serving in World War I. Upon his discharge, his reputation as a fiddler had increased and he visited many local fiddling contests. He teamed up with his nephew Luches "Luke" Kessinger (1906–1944) performing at various locations. In 1927, Clark and Luches Kessinger had their own radio show at the newly opened station WOBU in Charleston, West Virginia.

On February 11, 1928, the Kessingers travelled to Ashland, Kentucky to audition for James O'Keefe, a talent agent for the Brunswick-Balke-Collender recording company. The Kessingers were hired and, calling themselves The Kessinger Brothers, they recorded twelve sides the same day, six of the sides together with the caller Ernest Legg. Despite Clark Kessinger's increasing success as a fiddler and recording star, he had a regular job as a caretaker in Charleston. In the late 1920s, the Kessinger Brothers' records were best-sellers on Brunswick Records. During these recording sessions, the Kessinger Brothers recorded many classics such as "Wednesday Night Waltz", "Turkey in the Straw", "Hell Among the Yearlings", "Tugboat", and "Salt River."

Kessinger was also greatly influenced by classical violin players such as Fritz Kreisler, Joseph Szigeti and Jascha Heifetz. Following his last recording session on September 20, 1930, Kessinger retired as a recording artist. He and Luke Kessinger continued to appear as a couple on radio shows, country dances and clubs. For the next 34 years, Clark Kessinger worked as a painter. Meanwhile, he performed together with acts such as Natchee the Indian, the McGee Brothers, the Delmore Brothers, and Clayton McMichen. When Luke died in 1944, the story of the Kessinger Brothers came to an end.

In 1963, Kessinger was rediscovered by folk music promoter Ken Davidson. Davidson persuaded Kessinger to return to the music scene and soon he was competing at several fiddling contests. In August 1964, Kessinger formed a string band in Galax, Virginia consisting of guitarist Gene Meade and banjoist Wayne Hauser. His string band participated at the old-time music contest in Galax winning first prize in the string band category. Kessinger and his string band recorded for Davidson's label Folk Promotions Records. The recordings were released as "The legend of Clark Kessinger." Clark Kessinger continued to win prizes at different fiddling contests. In April 1971, he won the World's Champion Fiddle Prize at the 47th Old-time Fiddler's Convention in Union Grove, North Carolina. Three more albums followed on Davidson's new label Kanawha Records. His albums were later reissued on Folkways and County Records.

In 1971, Kessinger recorded 12 tracks for the newly formed Rounder Records. The record company had plans to record many albums with Kessinger but before they could initiate what they had planned, Kessinger had a stroke and collapsed on the scene at a fiddler's convention in Virginia. His left hand became numb and he was unable to play the fiddle for the rest of his life. Rounder released his recordings as "Clark Kessinger: Old-time Music With Fiddle and Guitar." He died in 1975. Kessinger is interred at the Cunningham Memorial Gardens in St. Albans, West Virginia.
