= French Mitchell =

Fiddler

French (Curley) Mitchell was a well-known American fiddler from Buffalo, West Virginia. French played the fiddle for more than 60 years and was a regular at the annual Vandalia Gathering on the statehouse grounds in Charleston.

== Performances ==
His first professional music job came in the mid-20s, when he and his brother, Auvil, and a banjo player formed the Buffalo Nighthawks and played on The Old Farm Hour on Charleston radio station WOBU. Curley performed on the WMMN Sagebrush Roundup radio show in the late 1930s.

The Mitchell brothers went on to play in Columbus, Ohio, and later in Wheeling on the WWVA Jamboree with Cowboy Loye and Tex Harrison. Mitchell played professionally off and on for the next 20 years.

== Recordings ==
French had one album recorded by the West Virginia Division of Culture and History when he was in his 70s. It was called First Fiddle and contained old favorites as well as several of his own compositions. The album is now out of print.

He has one track (Turkey in the Straw) on the LP called "The Music Never Dies: A Vandalia Sampler, 1977-1987" (Elderberry ER004).
