= Joseph Allard (fiddler) =

Canadian fiddler and composer

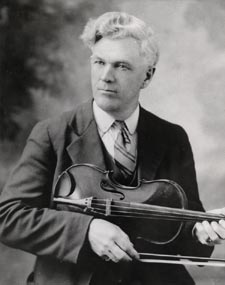
- Joseph Allard in 1927
- Born: February 1, 1873
- Died: November 14, 1947 (aged 74)
- Occupations: Canadian fiddler and composer.

Joseph Allard (February 1, 1873 – November 14, 1947) was a Canadian fiddler and composer. He occasionally recorded under the pseudonym Maxime Toupin. Allard made many popular recordings, including Reel de l'Aveugle, Reel de Chateauguay, Reel de Jacques Cartier, and Reel du voyageur. During most of his life he was rarely in the public eye, and worked much of his life as a fisherman. After his recordings became popular, he was known as The Prince of Fiddlers.

== Childhood ==
Allard's birthplace is reported both as 1 February 1873 in Woodland now Lery, Quebec and as 1 July 1873 in Châteauguay, Quebec. His family was living in Quebec when he was quite young. Allard's father was a fiddler, and when Allard reached the age of nine he was instructed in fiddling. Allard remained in Quebec until the age of sixteen, when he moved back to the United States, where he began to enter fiddling competitions.

== Fiddling ==
Allard entered fiddling competitions throughout the New England, winning competitions in Massachusetts, New Hampshire, Rhode Island and Connecticut. While in the United States, he met and married Alexina Couillard. Scottish and Irish musicians he met there taught him a number of Reels and Gigues. He continued to travel and play in the United States until 1917, when he returned to Canada and settled near Montreal, Quebec. Allard was one of five fiddlers to represent Quebec at a worldwide competition held in Lewiston, Maine in 1926, alongside Johnny Boivin, A. S. Lavallée, Médard Bourgie and Ferdinand Boivin. In 1928, Victor's Bluebird label contracted him to make recordings for them, and he produced 75 78s in his career. He would record six more under the pseudonym Maxime Toupin. Allard was one of the first French Canadians fiddlers to record commercially. Apart from traditional songs, Allard wrote around sixty songs of his own.

== Legacy ==
In 1976, a former student of Allard's, Jean Carignan released Jean Carignan rend hommage à Joseph Allard, a tribute album to Allard. Carignan began studying with Allard in 1926, and eventually learnt most of Allard's repertoire.

In 1997, on the fiftieth anniversary of Allard's death, Châteauguay named both a new room in the public library and a street in its musician's district after Allard.
