= Theron Hale =

American singer-songwriter

Theron Evan Hale
- Birth name: Theron Hale
- Born: May 21, 1883; Pikeville, Tennessee, USA.
- Died: January 29, 1954; Nashville, Tennessee
- Genres: Old-time music
- Instrument(s): fiddle, banjo
- Years active: circa 1926–1948
- Formerly of: Theron Hale and Daughters

Theron Evan Hale (May 21, 1883 – January 29, 1954) was an American old-time fiddle and banjo player. He was a member of the Grand Ole Opry in the late 1920s and 1930s, and is often remembered as a more laid back and sedate alternative to the raucous dance and "hoedown" music that dominated the Opry in its early days. Hale continued playing and recording until the late 1940s, often accompanied by Opry guitarist Sam McGee.

== Biography ==
Hale was born in Pikeville, Tennessee on May 21, 1883. He lived in Iowa for several years before moving to Nashville to work as a farmer and salesman. Hale first gained regional fame as a banjo player in the early 1900s, and taught the instrument to Chattanooga banjoist Homer Davenport. He joined the Grand Ole Opry (then called the WSM Barn Dance) in 1926. While he played both banjo and fiddle throughout his career, he only made recordings as a fiddle player. Hale's group "Theron Hale and Daughters"— which consisted of Hale on fiddle, Hale's daughter Elizabeth on piano, and daughter Mamie Ruth on either second fiddle or mandolin— recorded several tracks in 1928 and played regularly throughout the 1930s. The group dissolved after Mamie Ruth left in the late 1930s, although Theron continued playing informally throughout the following decade. Around 1948, Hale paired up with Opry guitarist Sam McGee to make several recordings for the Tennessee State Extension Project, which was promoting traditional square dancing music.

Unlike most Opry acts of the day, Hale preferred slow, traditional "twin fiddle" sets rather than dance music. Perhaps Hale's most well-known recording is "Hale's Rag," which was derived from a Charles L. Johnson composition. His repertoire also included "Jolly Blacksmith," which he recorded with his daughters in 1928, and "Fire in the Mountain," which he recorded with Sam McGee in the late 1940s.

He died on January 29, 1954.

== Discography ==
- Nashville: 1928 (Document, 1999) — contains "Hale's Rag" and "Jolly Blacksmith"
- Nashville - The Early String Bands, Vol. 2 (County, 2000) — contains tracks "Hale's Rag," "Jolly Blacksmith," and "Fire In the Mountain"
