= Lee Stripling =

Fiddler

Lee Edwin Stripling (August 30, 1921 – April 20, 2009) was a United States singer and fiddler in the old-time style.

Stripling was born in Kennedy, Alabama to Charlie and Tellie Stripling. His father, Charlie Stripling (1896–1966), was a well-known fiddler of his day. Lee played in the 1920s and 1930s in the American Southeast; in the early 1940s, he switched to Western Swing.

Stripling served in the Army Air Corps during World War II. After the war, he stopped playing professionally and moved to Seattle, Washington, where he worked as a bookbinder for the University of Washington. Following a hiatus of more than fifty years, he resumed his musical career, playing throughout the Pacific Northwest at Northwest Folklife Festival, MerleFest, The Berkeley Old Time Music Convention and touring several times through his old home region of Northwestern Alabama. He played with the Lee Stripling Trio and with the Six Footed Boys. He died on April 20, 2009, at the age of 87. He was married to Lucille (died 1998) with whom he had two daughters.

A documentary featuring him, Winging My Way Back Home: The Stripling Fiddle Legacy, was filmed over a three-year period by Jeri Vaughn.

== Recordings ==
- Hogs Picking Up Acorns Voyager, VRCD349, 2000
- The Lee Stripling Trio
