= Junior Daugherty =

American musician (1930–2023)

- Born: Forest Alton Daugherty Jr. July 19, 1930; Alamogordo, New Mexico, U.S.
- Died: March 8, 2023 (aged 92)
- Occupations: Fiddler; guitar player; songwriter
- Instruments: Fiddle, guitar

Forest Alton Daugherty Jr. (July 19, 1930 – March 8, 2023), better known as Junior Daugherty, was an American fiddler, guitar player and songwriter.

== Life and career ==
Daugherty was born in Alamogordo, Otero County, New Mexico on July 19, 1930.

Daugherty was ranked among the top five fiddlers in the United States over a fifteen-year period. He won the New Mexico state fiddling championship eight years, the Southwest Regional Championship, and was inducted into the New Mexico Fiddler's Hall of Fame and the Arizona Fiddler's Hall of Fame. Daugherty performed around the world at cowboy poetry events and at Carnegie Hall.

Poster from a country music festival featuring Daugherty and Doyle Lawson.

Daugherty married Verla Clay in 1950 and had three daughters, Penny, Voni, and Tammi — all musicians. He later lived in Colorado. He still participated in music events in later life, including the 2018 Festival of American Fiddle Tunes and 2021 Western & Swing Weekend Online.

Junior Daugherty died on March 8, 2023, at the age of 92.

== Recordings ==
- Honkytonkin
- A Labor of Love - Junior Daugherty and his Circle of Friends
- Lights of Pinon
- Back Stage with Junior Daugherty
- Fun Fiddlin
- Just Waltzin
- Just Fiddling’ - Vol 2
- Just Fiddling’ - Vol I
