= Gundula Krause =

German folk violinist

Gundula Krause (born 7 July 1966) is a German folk violinist. She lives in Mainz, Roetgen near Aachen and East-Clare (Ireland).

== Life and work ==
She was born in Göttingen, Germany. She moved to Los Angeles, California, during the 1980s where she learned bluegrass and cajun music at Hollywood's Westlake College of Music. She gathered her first experience in band music with her violin teacher Joe Miklich's formation The phiddleharmonics. She returned to Germany in 1986. At the University of Mainz she studied psychology. During this time she went to Galway and Doolin in Ireland for studying Irish folk and Folk rock. In 1992, she released her debut album, Dynamic Blend.

In the time about 1990 she was one of the first German folk violinists. She performed with a lot of bands from the Rhein-Main-area: Gundels Giganten (Mainz), Beaver Bangtree Band, The Bantree (Worms), Hibernians (Nauheim), Irish Rovers, Dagmar 41, Inbetween, Secret Paddy (all Frankfurt). Currently she plays in the jazz-folk-formation Wintergreen Goblins (Roetgen).

== Award ==
- In 1993 Gundula Krause won with Gundels Giganten the first place in the band competition of Südwestfunk Baden-Baden (Southwest-German Broadcasting Corporation Baden-Baden).

== Discography ==
- Gundels Giganten

Dynamic blend, Wiesbaden : Poni Records (PO 9202), 1992. Enth.: Breton gavottes. Shanghai Hbf. Fisherman's friend. Red winged blackbird. Pretty Polly. Celtic circus. Breton salsa.

- Hibernians

Autumn leaves, (CD 10762-01), 1995. Enth.: Impressions of a Joint Journey. The Little Drummer. The Butterfly. Song for Ireland. Cúnnla / Morrison's. Holes. The Green Fields of France. There Was a Time. Gaoth Barra na dTonn. Dobinn's Flowery Vale. Welcome Poor Paddy Home. As I Roved out. Kilkelly.

- The Bantree

The fairy tree, Worms: Rolf Bachmann, L. P. Steinkohl, 1996. Enth.: The fairy tree. Dúlamán. GG special. The foggy dew. Sean a chaoi. Irish home. Star of the County Down. Empty beach. Cheap chicken chick jig. Irish rover. Níl sén lá. My match is made.

- In between

Christmas goes jazz (CD), 1996

- Dagmar 41

Unsailable. Molecule Records 411, 2001. Enth.: Read Me. Semaphore. Defenestration. Glass Music. Here Comes Iocasta. Eve (Cress Reference). Marinade. Normal Song. Ammonites. The Thursday Room. King Arthur's Cafe. Phosphorus. Fins. Write With No Pen. Painted Sails.
