= Brenda Stubbert =

Canadian musician (born 1959)

- Birth name: Brenda Stubbert
- Born: 1959
- Origin: Point Aconi, Nova Scotia, Canada

Brenda Stubbert (born 1959) is a Cape Breton fiddler and composer from Point Aconi, Nova Scotia, Canada. She comes from a musical family, as her father, Robert, and uncle, Lauchie, were both well-known fiddlers. Brenda began step dancing and playing the piano at age five, and started playing fiddle at age eight.

Stubbert has made six solo recordings, and has published two books of tunes containing both her own compositions and other popular tunes from the Cape Breton fiddle repertoire. One of her best-known compositions is "Rannie MacLellan's Reel", which has been widely recorded by other musicians. In 1976, Stubbert was one of the fiddlers chosen to play for the Queen's visit to Halifax. Her 2008 recording Endless Memories won the 2009 East Coast Music Award for Roots/Traditional Solo Recording of the Year.

The tune "Brenda Stubbert's Reel", written by Jerry Holland, was named for her. Ashley MacIsaac made a folk-punk recording of the reel on his bestselling album Hi™ How Are You Today?.

== Discography ==
- Tamerack'er Down (1987)
- House Sessions (1992)
- In Jig Time (1994)
- Some Tasty Tunes (1999)
- Music All Around (2003)
- Endless Memories (2008)

== Books ==
- Brenda Stubbert's Collection of Fiddle Tunes
- Brenda Stubbert - The Second Collection
