= Tommy Doucet =

Canadian musician (1902–1992)

Thomas J. "Tommy" Doucet (June 8, 1902 – November 17, 1992) was an Acadian fiddler. He was born in Concession, Digby County, Nova Scotia, Canada. He emigrated to the Boston area, where he became very active in the club and dance hall music scene in the 1920s and 1930s. His repertoire included jigs, reels, foxtrots and 'hot' tunes.

Doucet recorded two albums. Down East Star, which was drawn from home recordings, includes some of his best material from his early period. The tracks on this album are: Temperance Reel Medley; Panhandle Swing; Blue Belles Of Scotland; Tom's E- Flat Clog/Banks/Autocrat; Superior Medley; Mrs. Dundas of Arniston; Lancers; Erin Reel; Joanne Reel; Shrips Clog; High Level Hornpipe; Fred Allen's; Irving's Clog/Cotton Eyed Joe; St. Lawrence River; Durham's Bull; Decision Reel; Shepard's Reel Medley; and St. Elmo's Clog.

He died on November 17, 1992, in Middlesex County, Massachusetts.

== Discography ==
- Down East Star, Rounder 7010, (1979/1955).
- Tommy Doucet: I Used to Play Some Pretty Tough Tunes, Fiddler FLRP 001, (1975).
