= Emily Poe =

American musician and attorney

Emily Stumler (née Poe), born in June 1985, known by fans as Emily Poe, is an American musician and attorney, most known for being Taylor Swift's former fiddle player.

== Music career ==
At age 6, Stumler began taking violin lessons. She attended Floyd Central High School and played in her school's orchestra. Stumler moved to Nashville to attend college and audition for country groups.

=== Work with Swift ===
Stumler was hired by Swift, in the early stages of Swift's career, following a successful fiddle audition for her band. In 2006, Stumler lived on a tour bus with Swift and her mom, Andrea Swift, and performed around the US and Canada. Stumler performed with Swift at the CMA Fest, at the Grand Ole Opry, and on talk shows. She appeared in Swift's music videos, “I’m Only Me When I’m With You” and “Our Song”.

== Law career ==
While in Swift's band, Stumler sat for, and passed, the LSAT, which prompted her to quit touring and enroll in law school at the University of Tennessee. Stumler is the chief deputy prosecuting attorney for Harrison County, Indiana. She specializes in cases involving violence against children.

== Personal life ==
In 2011, Stumler (née Poe) married Eli Stumler and took his last name. They have three children. One of their daughters plays the fiddle.
