= Dave MacIsaac =

Canadian musician from Nova Scotia (born 1955)

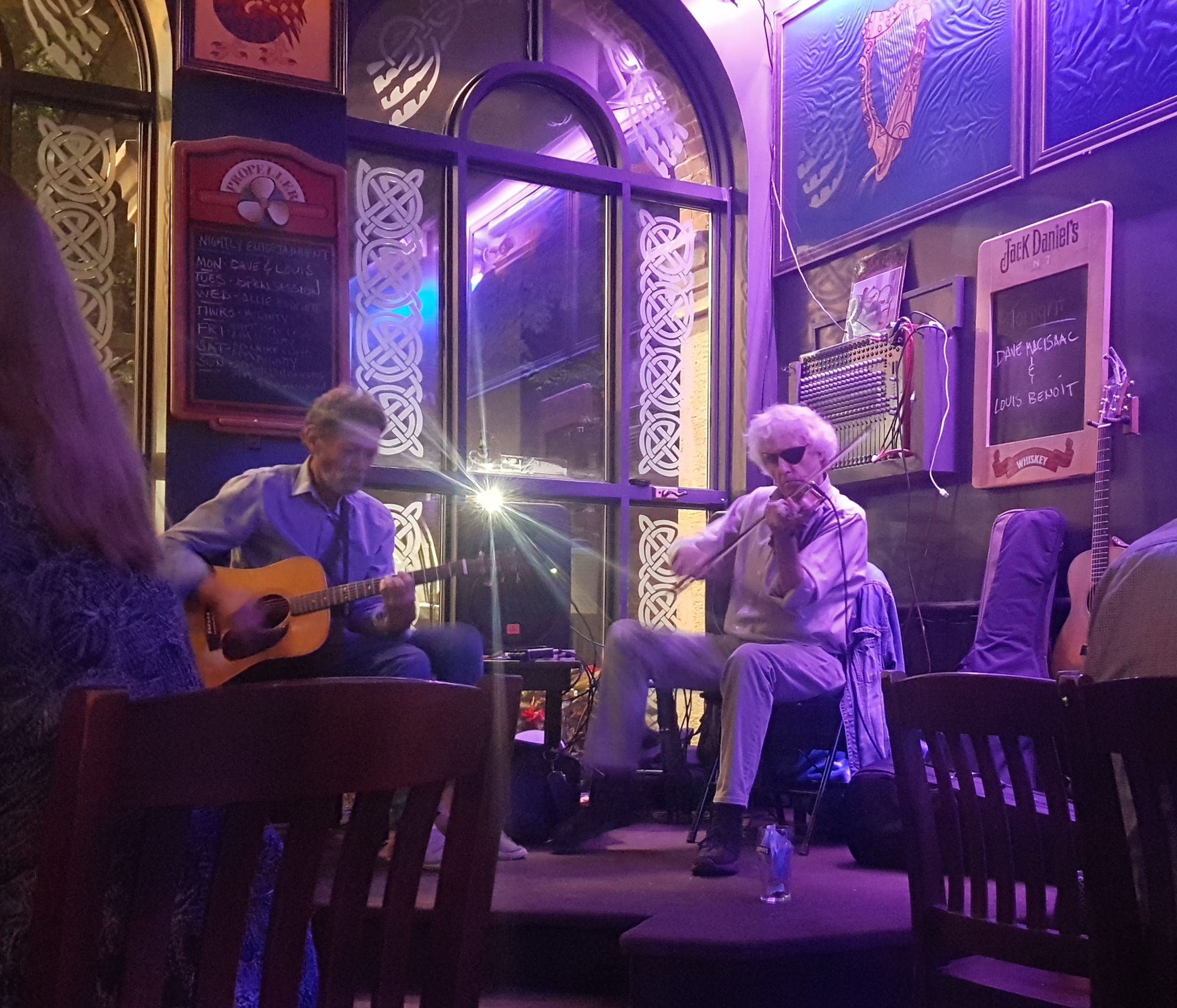
- Dave MacIsaac (right) on stage with Louis Benoit (left) in 2019

Background information
- Born: 1955 (age 70–71)
- Origin: Nova Scotia, Canada
- Genres: Celtic
- Occupation: Instrumentalist
- Instruments: Violin, guitar

Dave MacIsaac (born 1955) is a Canadian musician from Nova Scotia who plays the fiddle and guitar, specialising in the Celtic music style. He has two children, a daughter Mary Clare and a son named Angus.

== Awards and recognition ==
- 1996: East Coast Music Awards - winner: Male Artist of the Year; Instrumental Artist of the Year; Celtic Recording of the Year (Nimble Fingers)
- 2017: Honorary Doctorate from Cape Breton University

== Discography ==
- 1986 Celtic Guitar
- 1993: with Scott Macmillan, Guitar Souls
- 1995: Nimble Fingers
- 1999: From the Archives
- 2001: with Ashley MacIsaac, Fiddle Music 101
