= Ed Reavy =

Irish-American musician and composer

- Born: 1897; Barnagrove, County Cavan, Ireland
- Died: 1988 (aged 90–91)
- Genres: Irish
- Occupations: Musician, composer
- Instrument: Fiddle
- Labels: Victor

Ed Reavy (1897–1988) was an Irish-American musician and composer of numerous traditional Irish dance tunes. Born in the townland of Barnagrove (aka Barnagrow, Barnagrows or Barr na gCnó), Knappagh, County Cavan, he emigrated to Philadelphia in 1912 where he settled in the Irish-American enclave of Corktown (now part of Powelton Village). Except for two visits back to Ireland, he remained in the Philadelphia area for the remainder of his life.

== Biography ==
Reavy was a fiddler, and recorded in 1927 for the Victor record label, including two reels ("The Boys of the Lough" and "Tom Clark's Fancy") and two hornpipes ("The Donegal" and "The Cliff"). More than one hundred of his compositions have been published, and his sons have estimated that there may be more than five hundred in total.

His most famous tune may be "The Hunter's House".

His compositions and style of fiddling found their way back to Ireland and were very influential in the development of modern Irish Traditional Music.

Reavy was president of the Irish Musicians' Association of America.

In 2000, he was posthumously awarded the title "Composer of the Century" by an Irish-American organization.
