= Patrick Moran (musician) =

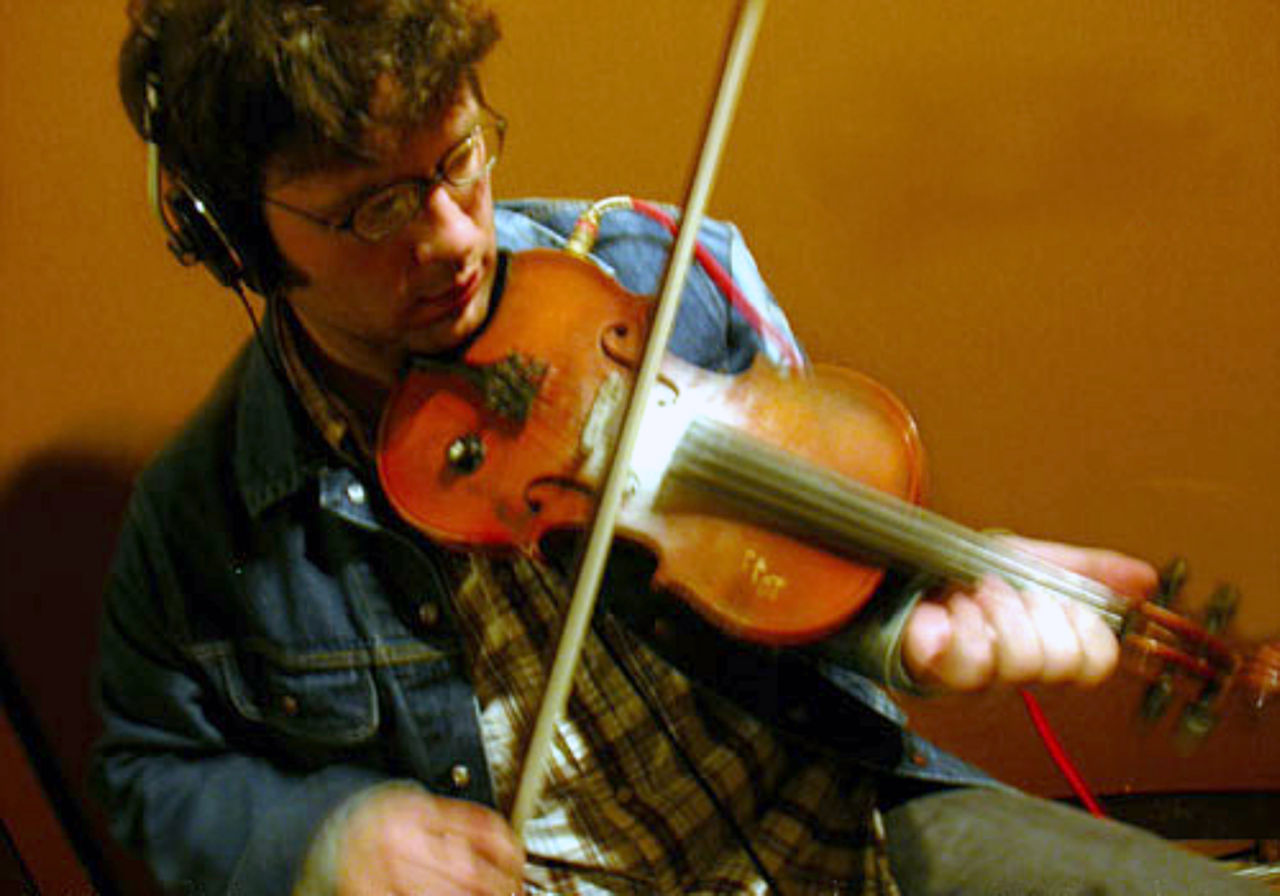
- Patrick "Paddy" Moran

Background information
- Born: June 7, 1975 (age 50); Pouch Cove, Newfoundland, Canada
- Origin: Newfoundland, Canada
- Genres: Sliabh Luachra
- Instrument: Fiddle
- Years active: 1982 – present

Patrick Moran (born June 7, 1975) is a professional fiddler born in Pouch Cove, Newfoundland, Canada.

Moran began playing the fiddle in 1982 as a student of fiddle player Kelly Russell. Moran ’s Sliabh Luachra style, nimble versatility and strong understanding of contemporary and traditional melodies has made him a highly respected studio fiddler throughout Canada.

Moran has collaborated with a number of well-known Newfoundland musicians at sessions, folk festivals, and concerts. He has performed throughout North America and Ireland with many prominent artists in traditional Irish and Newfoundland music, including Séamus Creagh, The Chieftains, Paddy Keenan, Ryan's Fancy, The Sons of Erin and he has appeared at 25 consecutive Newfoundland and Labrador Folk Festivals.

Moran currently performs as a member of the Celtic rock band The Punters, Irish-Newfoundland bands Tickle Harbour and Jeezus Murphy, Newfoundland band The Government Rams, and bluegrass band Crooked Stovepipe. He also currently performs with St.John's local band Heel and Toe.

Moran is also a record producer.

== Discography ==
- The Punters with (1995)
- Said She Couldn't Dance... with The Punters (1997)
- Snotty Var with Snotty Var (1997)
- Ná Keen Affair with Paddy Keenan (1997)
- Battery Included with Tickle Harbour (1998)
- Gypsy with Jim Fidler (1998)
- Fire In The Kitchen with The Chieftains (1998)
- The Long Haul with Shanneyganock (1999)
- Red Is The Rose with The Ennis Sisters (1999)
- Will You Wait with The Punters (2000)
- Good Work… If You Can Get It! with The Government Rams (2001)
- Scallywags with Shanneyganock (2002)
- Fisherman's Blues with The Punters (2003)
- By The Hush with Chris Andrews (2003)
- Set You Free with Shanneyganock (2004)
- Christmas with Shanneyganock (2004)
- Music From Land & Sea with Sandy Morris (2005)
- One Track Mind with The 8 Track Favourites (2005)
- No Place Like Home with Chris Andrews (2005)
- Just In Case with Crooked Stovepipe (2005)
- Songs For A Sunday Morning with The Punters (2006)
- Beautiful Star with The Punters (2006)

== See also ==
- Music of Canada
- List of Canadian musicians
