= Brian Conway =

Irish fiddler

Brian Conway is a contemporary Irish fiddler from New York.

Brian Conway is an American-born Irish fiddler. Brian went on to win several additional All-Ireland medals, including the senior All-Ireland fiddle championship in 1986. Brian also established a reputation for teaching students who went on to win All-Ireland fiddle awards, including Patrick Mangan, Maeve Flanagan, Haley Richardson, and Andrew Caden.

== Early life ==
Conway was born in 1961 in The Bronx, New York City. His parents were Irish immigrants from County Tyrone in Northern Ireland, with his father Jim Conway from Plumbridge and his mother Rose from Stewartstown. He grew up on Wallace Avenue in The Bronx. He first studied with Limerick-born fiddle player Martin Mulvihill, and was involved with Comhaltas Ceoltóirí Éireann, a thriving association promoting Irish traditional music. Brian soon also studied with Sligo-born fiddle master Martin Wynne, with whom Brian became lifelong friends. A little over a year after starting the fiddle, Brian won the under-12 All-Ireland Fiddle Championship. The adjudicator was Sean Keane of The Chieftains.
