= Buddy MacMaster =

Canadian musician

- Also known as: King of the Jigs
- Born: Hugh Alan MacMaster; October 18, 1924; Timmins, Ontario, Canada
- Died: August 20, 2014 (aged 89) Judique, Nova Scotia, Canada
- Genre: Cape Breton fiddle music
- Occupation: Musician
- Instrument: Fiddle
- Formerly of: Natalie MacMaster

Hugh Alan "Buddy" MacMaster CM ONS (October 18, 1924 – August 20, 2014) was a Canadian fiddler. He performed and recorded both locally and internationally, and was regarded as an expert on the tradition and lore of Cape Breton fiddle music.

== Early life ==
MacMaster was born in 1924 into a Gaelic-speaking home in Timmins, Ontario to John Duncan MacMaster and Sarah Agnes MacDonald MacMaster. The family was originally from Cape Breton Island in Nova Scotia, and in 1928 they returned to Cape Breton to settle in the town of Judique. MacMaster's father played the fiddle, but his mother sang to him from birth, lilting with a Gaelic inflection peculiar to the area. At an early age, MacMaster began to play the fiddle. At age 12, he had his first public performance at an amateur hour in Port Hood, Nova Scotia, and at age 14 he played his first professional gig at a square dance in the nearby town of Troy.

== Career ==
MacMaster continued to play nights at square dances across Nova Scotia, while taking on a career as a station agent and telegrapher for the Canadian National Railway to support himself and his family. In 1943, he made his first radio broadcast from the town of Antigonish, Nova Scotia in 1948. In the 1970s, he played regularly on CBC Television's Ceilidh show. After his retirement from the railroad in 1988, he went on to play full-time as a professional musician, often accompanied by piano. He continued to play music of mainly Scottish origin, supplemented with traditional Cape Breton and Nova Scotia tunes, and gained an international reputation, touring in Europe and the United States. He was one of the first Cape Breton fiddlers to be asked to teach in Scotland.

In 2005 he recorded an album with his niece, fiddler Natalie MacMaster.

== Awards ==
MacMaster was awarded an honorary doctorate from St. Francis Xavier University in Antigonish in 1995, and in 2000 he was awarded the Order of Canada for his contributions to Canadian culture. The Canadian Encyclopedia states that the citation for the Order of Canada read "as ambassador of Canadian music and a mentor to many, he is leading a Gaelic renaissance in Canada and abroad." He has appeared through Nova Scotia, Canada, the US and the UK for dances, in concert and in festivals such as the Atlantic Fiddlers' Festival, Cape Breton Fiddlers' Festival, Celtic Colours International Festival, Nova Scotia Highland Village Day, Cape Breton Fiddlers' Festival, the Nova Scotia International Tattoo, and the Celtic Sundance Festival, Utah. He also received the Order of Nova Scotia in 2003 for outstanding achievement benefiting the province and its residents. In October 2006, he was awarded an honorary doctorate from Cape Breton University in a special ceremony held in Judique. In 2023, he was inducted into the Canadian Fiddle Hall of Honour at the 2023 Canadian Grand Masters event in Truro, Nova Scotia.

== Personal life ==
MacMaster married Marie Beaton in 1968. They had two children, Mary Elizabeth MacMaster MacInnis (also a musician) and Allan Gerard MacMaster. MacMaster's youngest sister, Betty Lou Beaton, is one of Cape Breton's finest pianists and is married to well-known fiddler and composer Kinnon Beaton. He is also the uncle of Natalie MacMaster, another Cape Breton fiddler who has toured extensively and gained an international following and a distant cousin of American musician and record producer Jack White whose paternal grandparents were from Antigonish and Sydney Mines, Nova Scotia.

His son, Allan, was elected to the Nova Scotia House of Assembly in October 2009, representing the electoral district of Inverness as a Progressive Conservative.

== Death ==
MacMaster died at his home in Judique, Nova Scotia on August 20, 2014. He was 89.

== Discography ==
- Judique on the Floor (1989)
- Glencoe Hall (1991)
- The Judique Flyer (2000)
- Cape Breton Tradition (2003)
- Traditional Music from Cape Breton Island (2005) with Natalie MacMaster

He has also released a video, Buddy MacMaster, Master of the Cape Breton Fiddle.
