= James Morrison (fiddler) =

South Sligo-style Irish fiddler (1893–1947)

James or Jim Morrison (3 May 1893 – 1947), known as "The Professor", was a notable south Sligo-style Irish fiddler.

== Life ==
Morrison was born on 3 May 1893 near Riverstown, County Sligo at the townland of Drumfin. Morrison grew up in a community steeped in traditional Irish culture especially music and at the age of 17 he was employed by the Gaelic League to tutor the Connacht style of step dancing at the Gaelic League school in County Mayo.

In 1915, at the age of 21, he emigrated to America and settled in New York City. In 1918, Morrison won the fiddle competition at the New York Feis. Morrison become associated with other leading Irish musicians such as Michael Coleman and Paddy Killoran, who were also from County Sligo.

Morrison was one of the leading Irish music teachers in New York in the 1930s and '40s. In addition to the fiddle, he could play the flute, tenor banjo and button accordion (and wrote a tutor on the latter) and taught hundreds of young Irish-American students to play traditional music.

== Style and repertoire ==
The Sligo style of fiddle music Morrison played was typically highly ornamented and fast, with a fluid bowing style. Recordings of Morrison's playing were imported to Ireland in great numbers, and had an extraordinary impact. In many areas, local playing styles fell into disuse because of the popularity of the style and repertoire of Morrison and Michael Coleman. This repertoire included predominantly reels, rather than jigs and hornpipes, and were often played by Irish musicians in the same order as on the original recordings. According to Seamus MacMathuna, "More than thirty years after Coleman's death ... one seldom hears 'Bonny Kate' without 'Jenny's Chickens'. 'Tarbolton' is inevitably followed by 'The Longford Collector' and the Sailor's Bonnet'." The great Canadian fiddler Jean Carignan was much influenced by Morrison. James Morrison is well regarded by Frankie Gavin: "the approach he had to fiddle playing and the approach he had to any tune he touched just...can't be beaten...nobody can play like that today."
