= Paddy Killoran =

Irish traditional fiddle player

Background information
- Born: 21 September 1903; Emlaghgissan, near Ballymote, County Sligo, Ireland
- Died: 24 April 1965 (aged 61) New York, New York, United States
- Genres: Irish folk
- Occupations: Musician, Bandleader, Bar/restaurant owner, record company owner
- Instrument: Fiddle
- Years active: c. 1925–1963
- Labels: Crown, Decca, Dublin

Patrick J. Killoran (1903–1965) was an Irish traditional fiddle player, bandleader and recording artist. He is regarded, along with James Morrison and Michael Coleman, as one of the finest exponents of the south Sligo fiddle style in the "golden age" of the ethnic recording industry of the 1920s and 1930s.

== Early life in Ireland ==
Killoran was born 21 September 1903 in Emlaghgissan (also spelt "Emlagation"), a townland in the civil parish of Emlaghfad near the town of Ballymote in County Sligo, Ireland. His father Patrick played the flute and his mother Mary the concertina but the young Killoran was also influenced by local fiddle master Philip O'Beirne, who had earlier tutored Michael Coleman. As a teenager, Killoran was a volunteer with the Ballymote-based 3rd Battalion of the south Sligo Brigade of the Irish Republican Army during the war for independence.

== Emigration and career as danceband leader ==
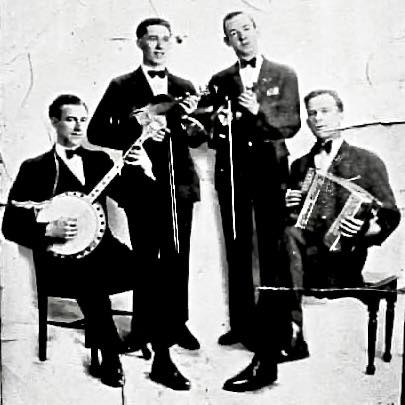
Richard Curran (banjo), D. Casey (fiddle), Killoran, Denis Casey (melodeon), c. 1929. Photo taken on 116th St., Harlem, NYC

In 1925, Killoran emigrated to New York City, arriving on May 19 on the Cunard liner Scythia. He may have had a rough passage - his entry on the Arriving Passenger roll was stamped "IN HOSPITAL DISCHARGED." Within a few months, he officially declared his intention to become a citizen of the U.S., listing his address as 227 East 126th Street in east Harlem and his occupation as "laborer." He would later lodge with fellow Sligo fiddler James Morrison in a Columbus Avenue apartment on Manhattan's Upper West Side. A 1927 newspaper ad for "Morrison's Orchestra" offered "Irish music by P. Killoran and J. Morrison, celebrated violinists," giving 507 West 133d Street in west Harlem as the contact address. Killoran soon launched his own career as a soloist and bandleader. A publicity photo of Killoran's quartet c. 1929 includes button accordionist Denis Casey, tenor banjo player Richard Curran and second fiddler D. Murphy. Around 1929 Killoran's group began playing regularly at the Pride of Erin Ballrooms located at the corner of Bedford and Atlantic Avenues in Brooklyn, and broadcasting on their weekly radio program. He also tried another side occupation - his 1931 naturalization petition listed his occupation as "Music store owner."

At the Pride of Erin, and later at the Sligo Ballroom at 125th Street and St. Nicholas Avenue in Harlem, Killoran's "Irish Orchestra" provided music for Irish dancing, while Jack Healy, another Ballymote native, led a group for "American" dancing. Healy, as a singer and tenor sax player, also performed and recorded with Killoran's group, the membership of which over the course of the 1930s included fiddler Paddy Sweeney (another Sligo native), fiddle and clarinet player Paul Ryan, Ryan's brother Jim on the C Melody sax, pianists Eileen O'Shea, Edmund Tucker and Jim McGinn, drummer Mickey Murphy, button accordionists Tommy Flanagan and William McElligott and tenor banjo/tenor guitar player Michael "Whitey" Andrews.

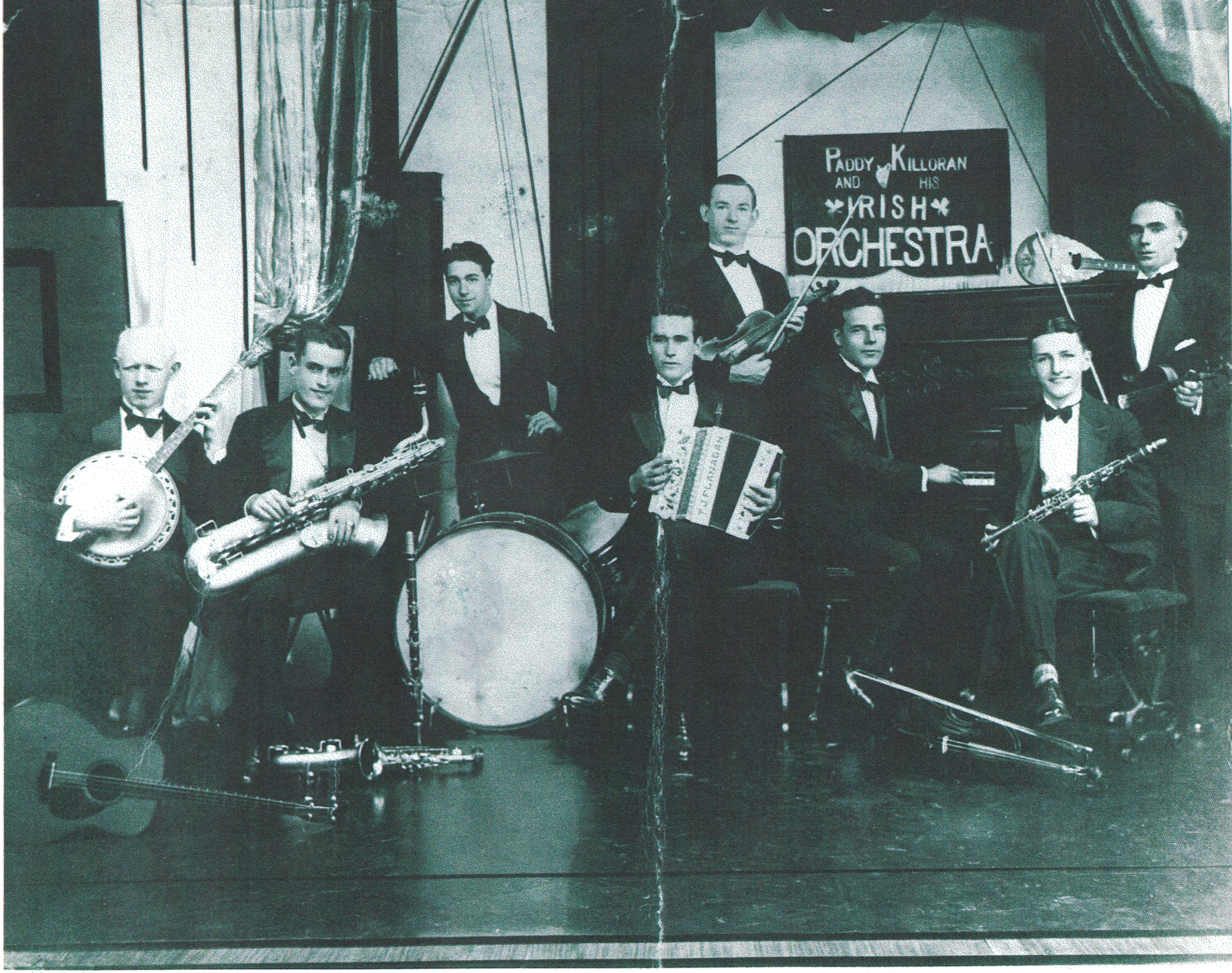
Whitey Andrews, Jack Healy, Mickey Murphy(?), Tommy Flanagan, Paddy Killoran, Jim McGinn, Pauly Ryan, Paddy Sweeney

Killoran's band was variously billed as his "Pride of Erin Orchestra," "Radio Dance Orchestra," "Sligo Ballroom Orchestra," "Lakes of Sligo Orchestra" and "Irish Barn Dance Boys." The group was a popular choice for county association functions, particularly those of Sligo and Roscommon. In 1932, he led a band that accompanied Cardinal O'Connell of Boston to the Eucharistic Congress in Ireland, and briefly billed his group as the "Pride of Erin Eucharistic Congress Orchestra." He would regularly perform at Irish beach resorts on the Rockaway peninsula and in East Durham in the Catskill Mountains.

Uniquely among the major New York Irish musicians of the pre-World War II era, Killoran continued his musical career through the 1950s. He issued new recordings, including duets with flute player Mike Flynn and some fiddle-and-viola sides with Paul Ryan, and led an active dance band. Age and illness eventually forced him to retire, and in 1962 he turned over leadership of the band, a fixture at the City Center Ballroom, to button accordionist Joe Madden (father of Cherish the Ladies flute player Joanie Madden).

== Recording artist, record label founder, cabaret owner ==
Starting in 1931, Killoran made dozens of recordings as a soloist, in duets with Paddy Sweeney, and with various ensembles for Crown, Decca and other labels. His recording career continued into the 1950s, when he recorded EP discs with Paul Ryan and guitarist Jack McKenna, as well as some tracks with Sligo flute player Mike Flynn. Some of Killoran's recordings were later reissued on LP or CD compilations.

Killoran was reputed to be a composer of Irish dance tunes, including "The Maid of Mt. Kisco," a still-popular reel that he recorded in 1937.

Despite his popularity, playing and recording music seems not to have been enough to pay the bills. Killoran's World War II 1942 draft card listed his employer as "80 John Street Corp.," suggesting that he was employed on the staff of a Travelers Insurance building in the Financial District. That same year, Killoran opened "Killoran's Tavern," a bar/restaurant at 42 West 60th Street in Manhattan, taking over a business founded by fellow musicians Jim Clark and George White. After World War II, with Clareman Jim Cleary, he operated a "cabaret" at 370 East 138th Street near Willis Avenue in the south Bronx, near his residence on 149th Street.

In 1956, Killoran was a co-founder of the "Dublin Recording Company," later better known simply as "Dublin Records," which was organized to record new Irish discs in New York.

Killoran was a founding member of the Emerald Irish Musicians Benevolent Society, a group that staged "Night of Shamrocks" concerts to raise money for the benefit of sick and deceased Irish musicians in New York. He was also a member of the Irish Musicians Association of America, and a New York branch of that organization (which later merged with Comhaltas Ceoltóirí Éireann) was named for him.

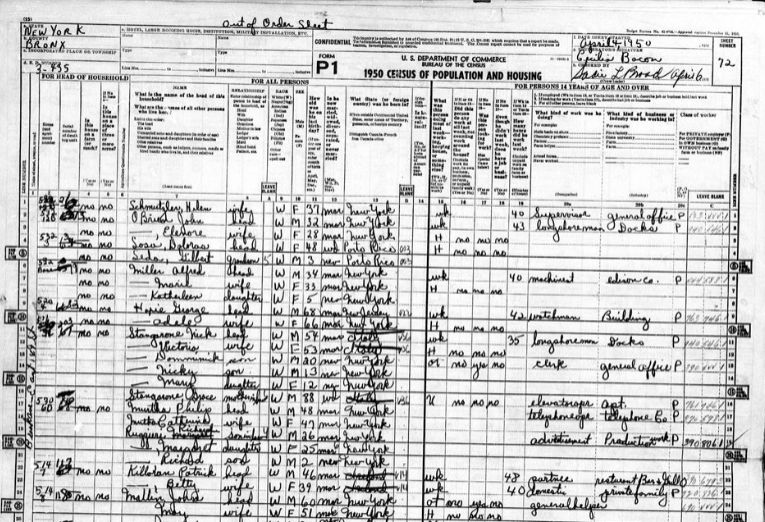
Killoran in 1950 census

== Personal life, reissue recordings and tributes ==
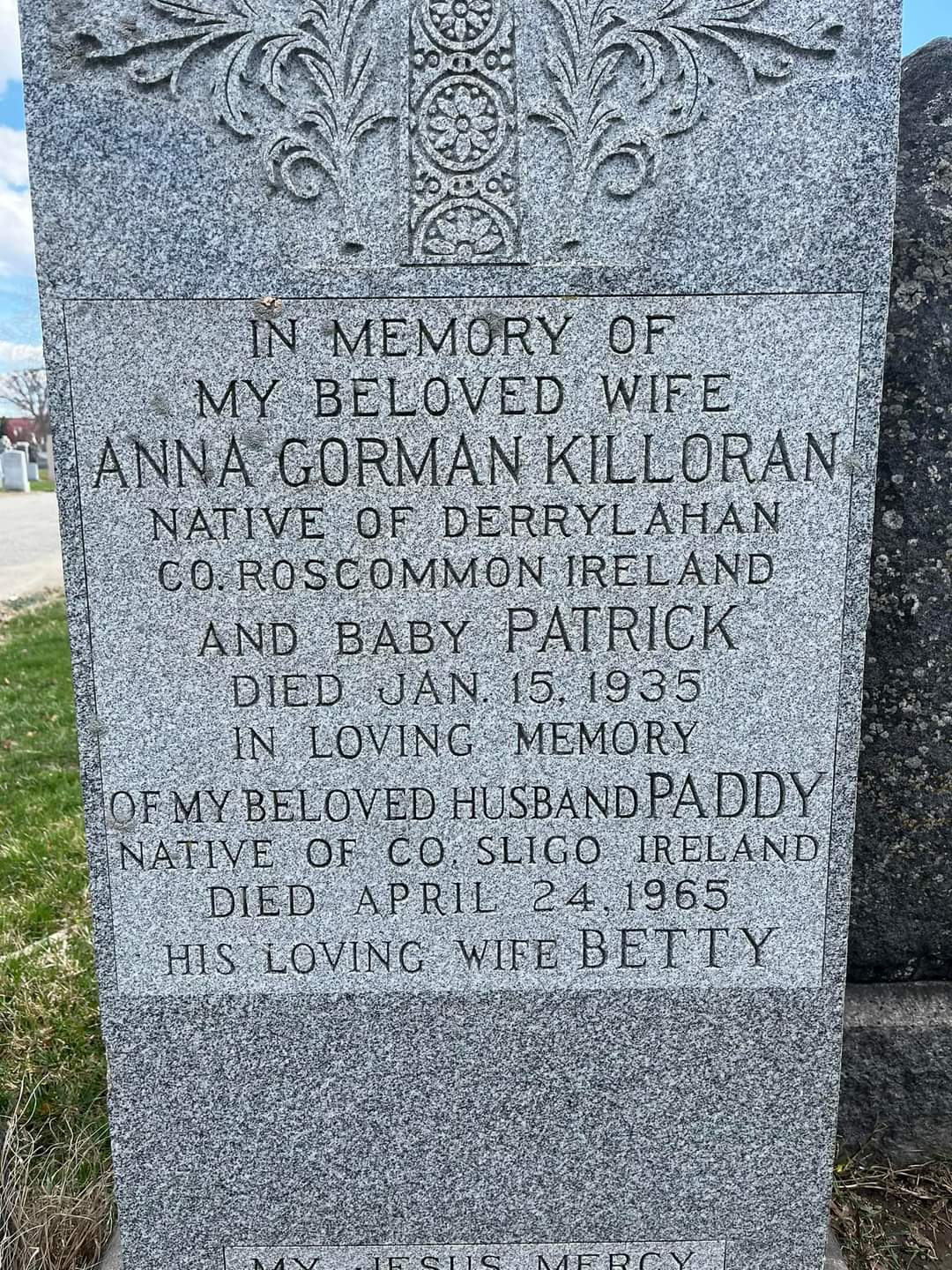
Paddy Killoran tombstone, St. Raymond's cemetery, Bronx, NY

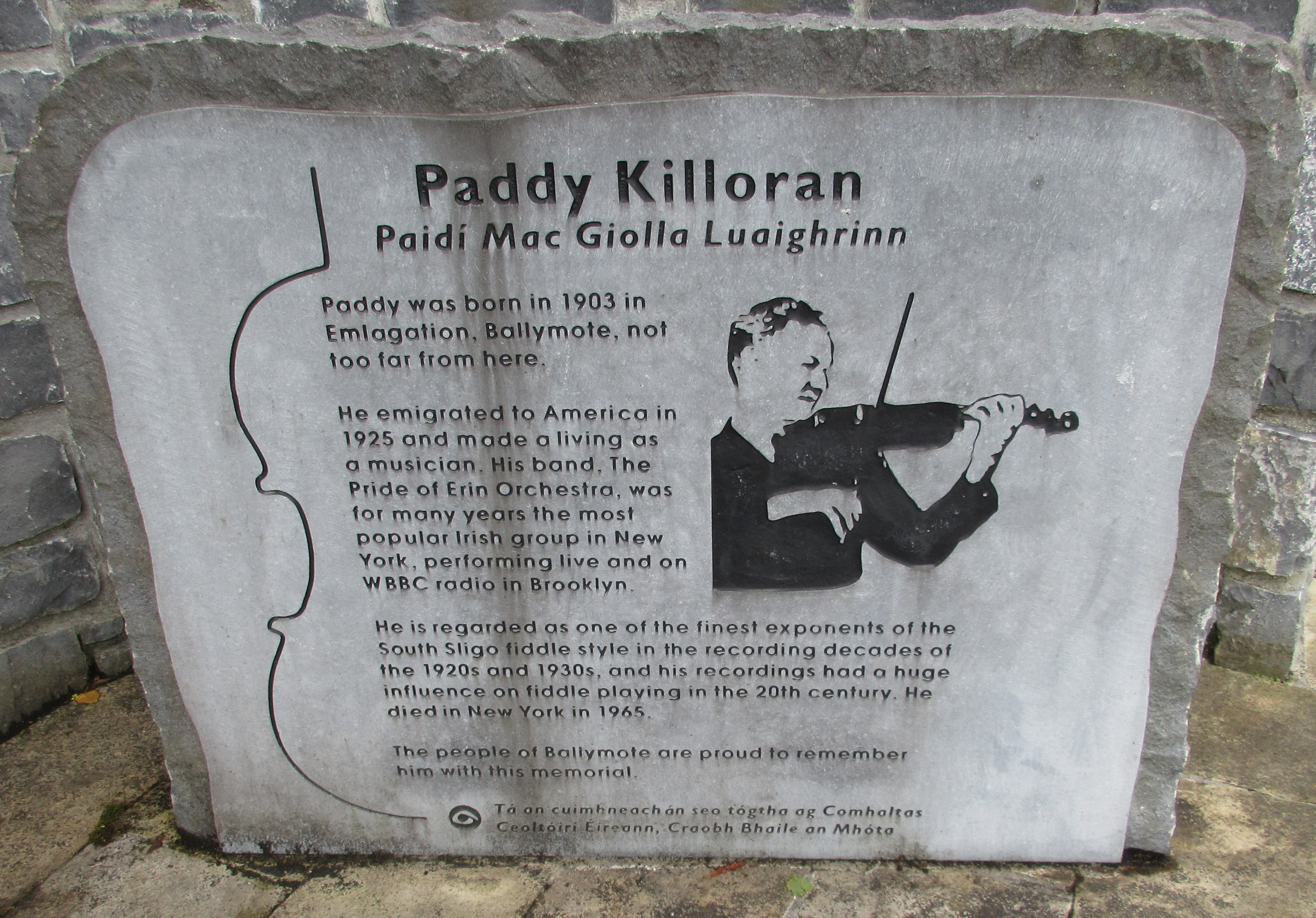
Paddy Killoran memorial stone, Ballymote, Co. Sligo

In addition to the 1932 trip to the Eucharistic Congress, Killoran returned to Ireland at least twice. In 1949, he played on a Radio Éireann program hosted by piper and folklorist Séamus Ennis. Some selections from that broadcast were recorded on a private disc and were later released on CD. On a 1960 honeymoon visit, he stayed in Sligo and Clare, and performed at a concert in County Longford. Killoran was married twice. His first wife, Anna Gorman, a native of Derrylahan, County Roscommon, died in childbirth on 15 January 1935. His second wife was Betty (Bridget) Hayes, an immigrant from Shanaway West, County Clare, who survived him. Paddy Killoran died in New York City on 24 April 1965.

A "Paddy Killoran Traditional Festival" is celebrated in the third week of June in Ballymote, where a monument in Killoran's honor was erected in 2012.

== Discography ==
- Paddy Killoran's Back in Town (Shanachie LP 33003, 1977). Included reissued Killoran solos and duets with Paddy Sweeney from 1930s 78 rpm sides. All 14 tracks from the LP were later reissued on the Coleman Music Centre CD From Ballymote to Brooklyn (CHC 007, 2002) along with most tracks from Shanachie's James Morrison LP.
- Memories of Ireland (Colonial LP LP-123, 1959). Most of the tracks are duets with Micheal Flynn, flute, with other musicians not listed, apparently all from late-1950s singles (78 and/or 45 rpm) recorded for Colonial and/or Standard (Colonial being owned by Standard Phono Corp.), based in New York.

Compilations that include Killoran selections:

- Old-Country Music in a New Land (New World LP NW264, 1977).
- From Galway to Dublin: Early Recordings of Irish Traditional Music (Rounder CD 1087, 1993).
- Milestone at the Garden: Irish Fiddle Masters from the 78 RPM Era (Rounder CD 1123, 1996).
- The Wheels of the World: Early Irish-American Music, vol. 1 and vol. 2 (Yazoo CD 7008, 1996 and 1997).
- A Farewell to Ireland (Proper Records CDs, Properbox3, 1999).
- Past Masters of Irish Dance Music (Topic CD TSCD604, 2000).
- Past Masters of Irish Fiddle Music (Topic CD TSCD605, 2001).
- Round the House and Mind the Dresser (Topic CD TSCD606, 2001).
- Traditional Irish Recordings from 1923 to 1947: Vol. 1 U.S. Recordings (Oldtime Records CD, OTR 101, 2006).
- Traditional Irish Recordings from the 1920s and 1930s: Vol. 2. U.S. Recordings (Oldtime Records CD, OTR 102, 2007).
- The Fiddler's Delight: Rare 78rpm Irish Fiddle Recordings 1921-1945 (Oldtime Records CD OTR 107, 2016).
