= Michael Coleman (fiddler) =

Irish fiddler (1891–1945)

- Born: 31 January 1891; Knockgrania, near Ballymote, County Sligo, Ireland
- Died: 4 January 1945 (aged 53) New York, New York, United States
- Genres: Irish folk
- Occupation: Musician
- Instrument: Fiddle
- Years active: 1909–1945

Michael Coleman (31 January 1891 – 4 January 1945) was a virtuoso Irish fiddler from County Sligo, and a major exponent of the Sligo fiddle style.

== Early years ==
Michael Coleman was born in Knockgrania, in the rural Killavil district, near Ballymote, County Sligo, Ireland. His father, James Coleman, was from Banada in County Roscommon, and a respected flute player. Michael was the seventh child of James and Beatrice, and the surviving half of a pair of twins.

As a child he learned step dancing and fiddle playing, and performed at local houses. His elder brother Jim had a high reputation but was never recorded. In his formative years Michael was influenced by Uilleann pipers (a type of bagpipe), including Johnny Gorman.

He left school in 1908, at the age of 17. He competed at the Sligo Feis Ceoil in 1909 and again in 1910, and was placed joint third on both occasions. In 1914 he moved to Manchester, England to live with his older brother Pat, but returned home after several months.

== Immigration to the United States ==
In October 1914, at the age of twenty-three, Coleman sailed to America with his friend John Hunt. Initially he stayed with his aunt in Lowell, Massachusetts and briefly joined the Keith Theatres vaudeville circuit. In 1917, he settled in New York City, and married Marie Fanning, originally from County Monaghan, Ireland. They had one child, Mary.

== Recording years ==
Between 1921 and 1936, Coleman recorded eighty commercial 78-rpm records for many record labels, including Shannon, Vocalion Records, Columbia Records, Okeh Records, New Republic, Pathe, O'Beirne de Witt, Victor Records, Brunswick Records, and Decca Records. Some of these were re-issued under the Intrepid, International Recording Company, Coral Records, Ace of Hearts Records, and Shanachie Records labels.

Coleman was usually accompanied by one of the following pianists: Kathleen Brennan, Arthur P. Kenna, John Muller, Eileen O’Shea, Edward Lee, and Ed Geoghegan. However, on three 1934 78 discs (six sides) for the Decca label, Coleman was accompanied by tenor guitar player Michael "Whitey" Andrews. Flute players Tom Morrison and Michael Walsh, and piccolo player Paddy Finlay, separately accompanied Coleman on a few of his 1920s recordings. In 1940, Coleman recorded four solo aluminum acetates for private collector James Carroll at the Wurlitzer Studios in New York, NY. In 1944, Coleman recorded ten tracks for the Decca controlled World Broadcasting Company on two, separate, 16-inch transcription discs. These were Coleman's final studio recordings, but they were never issued commercially.

== Musical style ==
"The Boys at the Lough"
A recording of Coleman performing "The Boys of the Lough" in 1921

Coleman was the most famous exponent of what is today known as the Sligo style of Irish fiddling, which is fast, flamboyant, and heavily ornamented with fingered "rolls" and bowed triplets. Coleman was also an excellent dancer and performer. Coleman danced and played the fiddle at the same time, as confirmed by his daughter Mary, on the Irish film, From Shore to Shore. James Morrison, Paddy Killoran and Paddy Sweeney were other famed Sligo fiddlers who also recorded in New York in the 1920s and '30s. While these musicians shared a basic approach and much common repertoire, there were noticeable differences in their playing. Coleman in particular employed extensive melodic variations, and his settings of tunes such as "The Boys of the Lough," "Bonny Kate" and "Lord Gordon's" have become part of the standard Irish fiddle repertoire. Some of Coleman's records were reissued on British labels and others reached Ireland as American imports, heavily influencing a new generation of fiddlers in Sligo and elsewhere.

== Legacy ==
Coleman died at Knickerbocker Hospital in New York City on January 4, 1945, and is buried in St. Raymond's Cemetery in the Bronx. Even after his death, Coleman's influence on traditional fiddle playing is substantial. Every generation since has been influenced by his recordings either directly or indirectly. Most notably, he has influenced fiddle players such as James "Lad" O'Beirne, Martin Wynne, Andy McGann, Ben Lennon, Martin Byrnes, Jean "Ti-Jean" Carignan and many others.

In 1974, a monument was erected by the Coleman Traditional Society. It is close to his birthplace, on the Tubbercurry to Gurteen road. Nearby is the Coleman Heritage Centre, a music archive and a replica of the house where he lived. The monument bears this inscription:

"Michael Coleman. Master of the fiddle. Saviour of Irish traditional music. Born near this spot in 1891. Died in exile 1945."

In March 2015, the U.S. Library of Congress chose its annual list of sound recordings for inclusion in its National Recording Registry. Among those chosen were Coleman's 1922 Vocalion Records release of his rendition of "The Boys of the Lough" and "The Humors of Ennistymon".

== Discography ==
- Irish Jigs and Reels - Coral 57369 (1961, LP)
- Irish Jigs and Reels - Ace Of Hearts 56 (1961, LP)
- The Musical Glory Of Old Ireland - International Recording Co. 3327 (1967, LP)
- The Heyday Of Michael Coleman - Intrepid Records (5) (1973, LP)
- The Legacy Of Michael Coleman - Shanachie 33002 (1976, LP)
- The Classic Recordings Of Michael Coleman - Shanachie 33006 (1979, LP)
- Michael Coleman 1891-1945: Ireland's Most Influential Traditional Musician of the 20th Century - Viva Voce 004, Viva Voce/Gael-Linn CEFCF 161 (1991, Cassette, 1992/2011, CD)
- The Enduring Magic - Coleman Heritage Center 008 (2004, CD)

Irishtune.info maintains a record of individual tracks on compilation albums that include reissues of Michael Coleman recordings, both commercial and archival.
