= The Rankin Family discography =

- Studio albums: 8
- Extended plays: 1
- Compilation albums: 2
- Singles: 21
- Video albums: 1
- Music videos: 18

The Rankin Family is a Canadian musical family group from Mabou, Nova Scotia. Their discography comprises eight studio albums, two compilation albums, one extended play, 21 singles, 18 music videos, and one video album.

== Albums ==
=== Studio albums ===
| Title | Details | Peak positions | | Certifications |
| Title | Details | CAN | CAN Country | Certifications |
|---|---|---|---|---|
| The Rankin Family | Release date: 1989; Label: Self-released / EMI (re-issue) | — | — | CAN: Platinum |
| Fare Thee Well Love | Release date: November 7, 1990; Label: Self-released / EMI (re-issue) | 5 | 1 | CAN: 5× Platinum |
| North Country | Release date: August 24, 1993; Label: EMI | 7 | 1 | CAN: 4× Platinum |
| Endless Seasons | Release date: August 29, 1995; Label: EMI | 13 | 6 | CAN: 2× Platinum |
| Do You Hear…Christmas (credited as Heather, Cookie and Raylene Rankin) | Release date: November 1997; Label: EMI | — | — | |
| Uprooted | Release date: April 28, 1998; Label: EMI | 30 | — | CAN: Gold |
| Reunion | Release date: January 16, 2007; Label: Longview Music | — | — | |
| These Are the Moments | Release date: February 3, 2009; Label: MapleMusic | — | — | |
"—" denotes releases that did not chart

=== Compilation albums ===
| Title | Details | Peak positions | | Certifications |
| Title | Details | CAN | CAN Country | Certifications |
|---|---|---|---|---|
| Collection | Release date: September 24, 1996; Label: EMI | 14 | 1 | CAN: 2× Platinum |
| Souvenir: 1989—1998 | Release date: April 1, 2003; Label: EMI | — | — | CAN: Gold |
"—" denotes releases that did not chart

== Extended plays ==
| Title | Details | Peak positions | Certifications |
| Title | Details | CAN | Certifications |
|---|---|---|---|
| Grey Dusk of Eve | Release date: March 1995; Label: EMI | 29 | CAN: Gold |

== Singles ==
| Year | Single | Peak positions | | | Album |
| Year | Single | CAN | CAN AC | CAN Country | Album |
|---|---|---|---|---|---|
| 1989 | "Mo Run Geal Dileas (My Faithful Fair One)" | — | — | — | The Rankin Family |
| 1992 | "Orangedale Whistle" | — | 25 | 7 | Fare Thee Well Love |
| 1992 | "Fare Thee Well Love" | 14 | 8 | 9 | Fare Thee Well Love |
| 1993 | "Gillis Mountain" | — | 6 | 4 | Fare Thee Well Love |
| 1993 | "Rise Again" | 12 | 4 | 31 | North Country |
| 1993 | "North Country" | 30 | 5 | 4 | North Country |
| 1994 | "Borders and Time" | 23 | 10 | 21 | North Country |
| 1994 | "Tramp Miner" | — | 26 | 31 | North Country |
| 1994 | "Turn That Boat Around" | — | — | — | North Country |
| 1995 | "Grey Dusk of Eve" (with Liam Ó Maonlaí) | 85 | 31 | — | Grey Dusk of Eve |
| 1995 | "You Feel the Same Way Too" | 46 | 14 | 14 | Endless Seasons |
| 1996 | "The River" | 38 | 12 | 36 | Endless Seasons |
| 1996 | "Forty Days and Nights" | — | — | 18 | Endless Seasons |
| 1996 | "Roving Gypsy Boy" | — | 23 | 9 | Collection |
| 1998 | "Movin' On" | — | — | 7 | Uprooted |
| 1998 | "Maybe You're Right" | — | 21 | — | Uprooted |
| 1998 | "Bells" | — | — | — | Uprooted |
| 1999 | "Let It Go" | — | 16 | 40 | Uprooted |
| 2006 | "Sunday Morning" | — | — | — | Reunion |
| 2009 | "Never Alone" | — | — | 24 | These Are the Moments |
| 2009 | "Straight Into Love" | — | — | — | These Are the Moments |
"—" denotes releases that did not chart

== Videography ==
=== Video albums ===
| Title | Details | Certifications |
|---|---|---|
| Back Stage Pass | Release date: 2006; Label: Longview Music | CAN: Gold |

=== Music videos ===
| Year | Video | Director |
|---|---|---|
| 1992 | "Fare Thee Well Love" | Philip Kates |
| 1993 | "Rise Again" | |
| 1993 | "North Country" | Jacoba Dedert |
| 1994 | "Borders and Time" | Jeth Weinrich |
| 1995 | "You Feel the Same Way Too" | George Doughterty |
| 1996 | "The River" | Jeff Siberry / Robin Trickett |
| 1996 | "Forty Days and Nights" | George Dougherty |
| 1996 | "Roving Gypsy Boy" | George Dougherty |
| 1998 | "Movin' On" | George Dougherty |
| 1998 | "Maybe You're Right" | |
| 1998 | "Bells" | Ulf Buddensieck |
| 2009 | "Straight Into Love" | |
| 2014 | "Go Tell It on the Mountain" (with Johnny Reid and Natalie MacMaster) | Margaret Malandrucco |

== See also ==
- Jimmy Rankin § Discography
- Heather Rankin (singer) § Discography
