= Heather Rankin =

Canadian singer, songwriter and actor (born 1967)

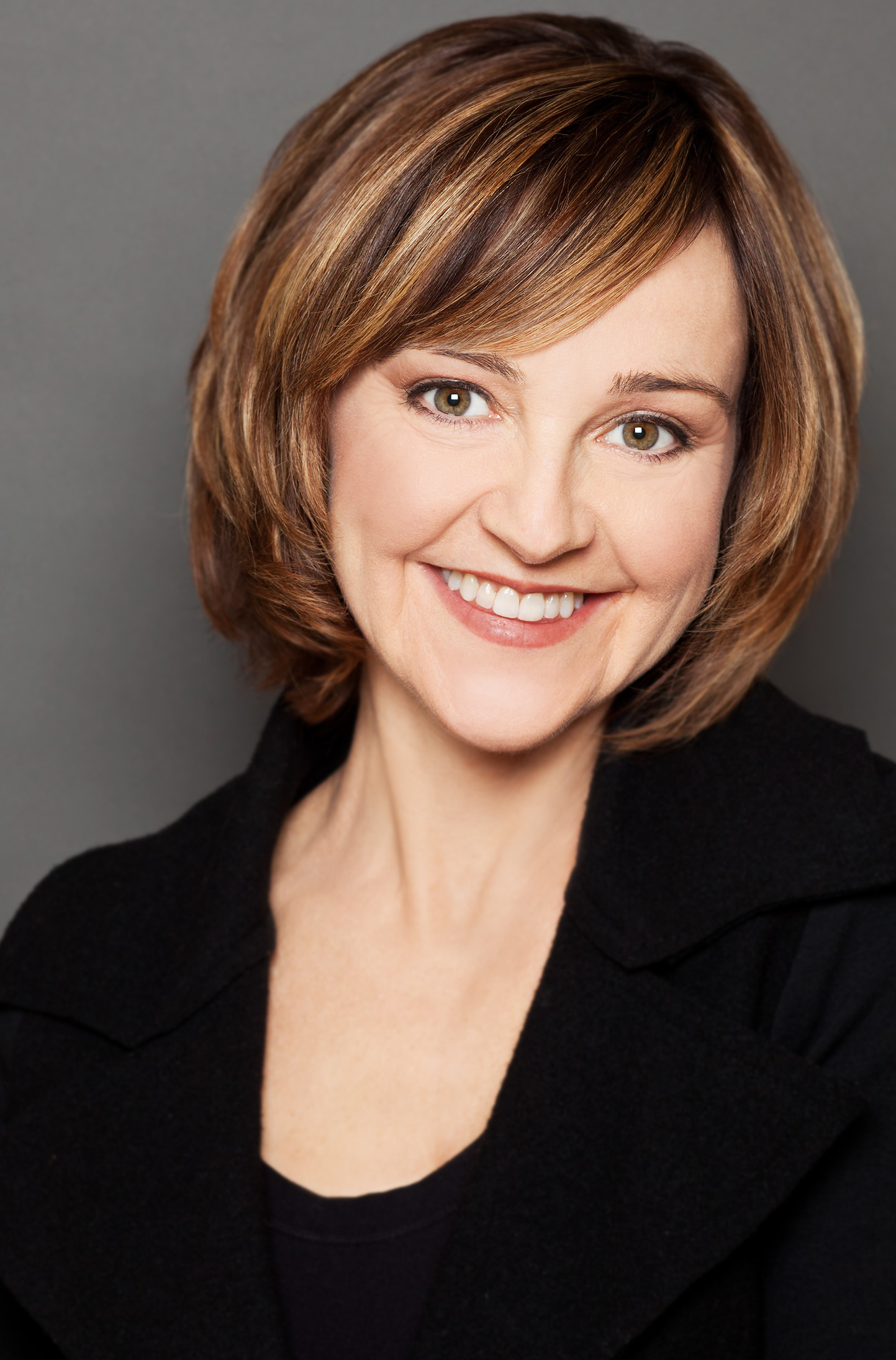
- Heather Rankin in 2013. Photo by Timothy Richard.

Background information
- Born: Heather Elaine Rankin; October 24, 1967 (age 58); Mabou, Nova Scotia, Canada
- Genres: Folk, country, singer-songwriter
- Occupations: Singer-songwriter and actor
- Years active: 1989–present
- Labels: EMI Canada; Cadence Music Group; Back Street Music Ltd.

Heather Elaine Rankin OC (born October 24, 1967) is a Canadian singer, songwriter and actor. She is best known as a member of the multi-platinum selling musical group The Rankin Family.

Between 1989 and 1999, the family band released five full albums, a five-song EP and two compilations of their most popular songs. They toured extensively in Canada, the U.S., the U.K., Australia and New Zealand and won six Juno Awards, three Canadian Country Music Awards, an American country music Television Award and fifteen East Coast Music Awards. Combined sales of their recordings exceeded 1.5 million copies.

As an actor, Rankin has performed on stages in Toronto and Halifax and has appeared in a number of films. She is also co-owner of The Red Shoe Pub in Mabou, Cape Breton.

Rankin has released two solo records, A Fine Line (2016) and Imagine (2017). In December 2024, the Governor General of Canada announced Rankin’s appointment to the Order of Canada.

== Early life ==
Heather Rankin was born in Mabou, Nova Scotia, a rural community deeply rooted in its Gaelic tradition. She is the eleventh of twelve children born to Kathleen and Alexander (Buddy) Rankin. She began singing as a child in the St. Mary's Parish Choir and the Community Children's Gaelic Choir. Her parents encouraged all their children to perform at community concerts and that is where Rankin began singing and step dancing at the age of five years.

In the 1970s, Rankin's older siblings, Genevieve, Geraldine, David, John Morris, and Raylene began singing together at community events in Mabou, licensed dances called Pig and Whistles, and at wedding receptions and concerts. When the eldest siblings, Genevieve, Geraldine, and David went on to University or College, younger siblings Jimmy, Cookie, and Heather took their places. Heather was the youngest and last member to join the family band.

Rankin's earliest influences as an actor were touring productions from Mulgrave Road Theatre and Mermaid Theatre, as well as watching The Carol Burnett Show. She performed in a Community Theatre production of A Christmas Carol while in Junior High and in High School was selected for the Highland Youth Theatre Exchange in Scotland. She went on to Major in Theatre at Acadia University, from whence she graduated in 1989. While in University, Rankin performed as a singer and an actor in The Cape Breton Summertime Revue, which toured to Halifax, Pictou and Sydney.

== The Rankin Family (1989–1999) ==
In 1989, Rankin and four of her siblings, John Morris, Raylene, Jimmy, and Cookie, had their music featured in a show called The Mabou Jig. They recorded their debut album, The Rankin Family, the same year at Inception Sound in Toronto, Ontario. The record featured original songs by Jimmy and Raylene and original fiddle tunes by John Morris, as well as traditional folk songs, jigs and reels. The record would be re-released by Capitol Records in 1992 and be certified Platinum by CRIA.

The Rankin Family was first featured on CBC Television in an episode of On the Road Again in 1989. The following year their second album, Fare Thee Well Love was recorded at Inception Sound and released on November 7, 1990. Initially, the Rankin siblings distributed both of these records themselves, peddling them to gift shops, grocery stores, record stores, at live performances at music festivals across the country, and out of the trunk of their mother's car. This record was re-released by Capitol Records in 1992 and is certified 5× Platinum by CRIA. The title song, "Fare Thee Well Love," along with "Orangedale Whistle" and Gillis Mountain peaked in the top ten on the RPM Country and Adult Contemporary Tracks in 1992. The music video for "Fare Thee Well Love" was on the Top 30 Charts for Much Music for nine weeks in 1993.

In 1990, the CBC produced a documentary television special called Here Come The Rankins!, which followed the band to the Winnipeg Folk Festival and then back home to Cape Breton.

In 1991, The Rankin Family won their first three ECMA Awards for Best Live Act, Best Roots & Traditional Artist and Best Recording Band. They would go on to win twelve more before they disbanded, the last being for Group of the Year in 1999.

In 1992, The Rankin Family signed with EMI Canada, were nominated for three Juno Awards, and on July 1 performed on Parliament Hill for Queen Elizabeth II as part of the 125th Anniversary of Canadian Confederation. Their third album, North Country, was released on August 24, 1993. It peaked at number one on the RPM Country Albums chart. It is certified 4× Platinum by CRIA.The title song, with lead vocals by Heather, peaked at number four on the RPM Country Albums Chart. The music video for "North Country" was also on the Top 30 Charts for Much Music for five weeks in 1994.

Later that year The Rankin Family won four Juno Awards. Their limited-edition EP, Grey Dusk of Eve, was released in March 1995 and is certified Gold by CRIA. Endless Seasons followed on August 29, 1995, and peaked at number six on the RPM Country Albums Chart. It is certified 2× Platinum. Their first Greatest Hits album Collection was released September 24, 1996 and was number one on the RPM Country Albums charts and is certified 2× Platinum. Heather hosted the East Coast Music Awards in 1996 in Charlottetown with Denny Doherty.

Between 1989 and 1998, The Rankin Family toured extensively in Canada, playing such houses as The Jubilee Auditorium in Edmonton and Calgary, the National Arts Centre in Ottawa, Massey Hall in Toronto, and The Orpheum in Vancouver. They were guests on Rita MacNeil’s variety show Rita and Friends and in the television special Anne Murray in Nova Scotia. They also toured in the United States, playing the MerleFest in Wilkesboro, North Carolina, the Performing Arts Series at Villa Montalvo in Saratoga, California, The Glen Echo Irish Folk Festival in Washington D.C., the Milwaukee Irish Festival in Wisconsin, Bumbershoot 1996 in Seattle, and folk festivals in Lowell, Massachusetts, Chattanooga, Tennessee, and Columbus, Ohio. They were featured on Garrison Keillor's radio program Prairie Home Companion, performed at the Bluebird Cafe and the Ryman Auditorium in Nashville and shared the bill with Alison Krauss for some American dates. In 1995 they performed at The Bottom Line in New York for a televised documentary called The Rankin Family Backstage Pass. In 1996, Heather and her four siblings received Honorary Doctorates in Music from Acadia University in Wolfville. At the same time, The Rankins also played the Royal Concert Hall in Glasgow, Scotland and The Royal Albert Hall in London, England and at festivals such as Celtic Connections and the Cambridge Folk Festival. They were also featured on BBC Television’s New Year's Special Hogmanay Live and in the Scotland Gaelic Television program An Talla Bhalla. In 1997, The Rankin Family won their fifth Juno Award for Country Group or Duo of the Year. They would win their final Juno for Best Country Group in 2000.

Uprooted, The Rankin Family's fifth studio album, was released on April 28, 1998, and is certified Gold by CRIA. It is the first Rankin Family record to include one of Heather's original songs: "Cold Winds." It peaked at Number 12 on the US Billboard charts. Rankin and her siblings are also featured on The Chieftains’ 1998 record Fire in the Kitchen, singing "An Innis Aigh" (The Happy Isle) and their rendition of "Jimmy Mó Mhíle Stór" appears on The Chieftains’ 1999 record Tears of Stone, which also features performances by Joni Mitchell, Bonnie Raitt, and Diana Krall.

In September 1999, The Rankin Family announced that they were disbanding to pursue individual creative interests. Heather shifted her focus toward a career as an actor.

== Acting career (2001–present) ==
Before her success with The Rankin Family, Heather had intended to pursue a career as an actor. In April 2001 she played Mary Magdalene in Neptune Theatre's production of Jesus Christ Superstar in Halifax. She was then cast in Factory Theatre's production of Necessary Angel's The Piper in Toronto the following year. She was nominated for a Robert Merritt Award for Best Actress in a Leading Role in 2012 for her portrayal of Bitsy in Bingo, a Neptune Theatre and Mulgrave Road production, written by Daniel MacIvor. She has also starred on stage in MacIvor's play Something Small at Chester Playhouse and in Michael Melski's Hockey Mom, Hockey Dad at Neptune Theatre.

In 2001, Rankin played Phoebe on an episode of Lexx. Her film work includes appearances in The Hanging Garden, Wild Dogs, Marion Bridge, Still Standing, Mr. D, Scotland, PA., Nonsense Revolution, and Faith, Fraud & Minimum Wage.

== The Rankin Sisters (1997–present) ==
In November 1997, Heather and her sisters, Raylene and Cookie, released their Christmas record Do You Hear… It featured a selection of music that the Rankin sisters had sung in their Christmas choir growing up in Mabou. This was the first album to include one of Heather's songs, "The Christmas Star." Heather, Raylene, and Cookie took their Christmas music on tour across the country almost every holiday season between 1997 and 2010, sometimes playing with Canadian Symphonies. They also made two Christmas Television Specials: A Rankin Christmas Cabaret for CBC in 1999 and Home For Christmas for Bravo in 2005.

In 1999, Heather, Cookie and Raylene hosted the documentary Celtic Tides, which featured performances and interviews by Mary Black, John Allan Cameron, Ashley MacIsaac, Natalie MacMaster, and Loreena McKennitt, among others.

In 2000, Carly Simon asked Heather, Raylene, and Cookie to record background vocals for her album The Bedroom Tapes at her Martha's Vineyard Studio Space. Heather sang with Simon on The View, Good Morning, America, and The Rosie O'Donnell Show, and in a free concert in Bryant Park. At this concert Heather sang backup on Simon's hit song "You're So Vain."

In 2005, Heather, Raylene, and Cookie, with their sister Genevieve, purchased the Red Shoe Pub in Mabou. The pub was originally a century-old general store and a place where the Rankins' great-grandmother, Sadie Wright, and her daughter, Margaret, once sold butter, eggs, and vegetables from their farm in Mull River. The pub is now seasonally operated, offers a full menu, and live, local music daily from June 1 to mid October each year. It attracts Celtic music lovers and Rankin Family fans from around the world. Artists such as Buddy MacMaster, Glenn Graham, and Wendy MacIsaac have played at the pub in recent years. In 2011, The Red Shoe was awarded Restaurant of the Year- Essence of Nova Scotia at the Taste of Nova Scotia Prestige Awards. In 2014, Heather and her sisters were awarded the Arts and Culture Achievement Award by Women in Business in Cape Breton. In 2012, The Red Shoe was nominated for an ECMA Award for Best Performance Venue.

== Rankin reunion (2007–2016) ==
Heather's brother, John Morris Rankin, was killed in a car crash in Cape Breton on January 16, 2000, shortly after the band announced they were going their separate ways. Exactly seven years later Heather, Jimmy, Raylene, and Cookie released their sixth studio album with EMI, Reunion, which featured Heather's original song "Nothing to Believe In." John Morris’ daughter, Molly, also added a track, "Sunset," to the album and joined her aunts and uncle on their tour across Canada. A Sandra Faire/CTV television production called The Rankin Family Reunion marked the group's first television special since the death of John Morris and, with almost one million viewers, was the highest rated entertainment program in its time slot when it aired in December 2008.

These Are the Moments was released on February 3, 2009, by MapleMusic Recordings. It included Heather's song "Nothing to Believe In" and a newer song called "I Would." The four siblings toured in 2009 and 2010, but in January 2012 only Heather, Cookie, and Jimmy were able to perform in venues from British Columbia to Thunder Bay while Raylene underwent chemotherapy for a recurrence of cancer. She died on September 30, 2012.

In 2009, The Rankin Family were awarded a Special Director's Award at the ECMAs "in recognition of the Cape Breton group's contribution to the music industry on a national and international level." At the 2013 East Coast Music Awards The Rankin Family received a special 25th Anniversary Music Award.

In 2014, Heather, Jimmy and Cookie sang on the track "Go Tell It On The Mountain" on Johnny Reid's Platinum Edition of his album A Christmas Gift to You. They also appeared, with Natalie MacMaster, in the music video, which was shot in Sydney, Nova Scotia. That New Year's Eve Heather, Jimmy and Cookie came together again to perform in Summerside for the New Year's Eve Finale 2014 with Burton Cummings and Doc Walker.

== Additional (1995–present) ==
In 1999, Heather sang "The Water is Wide" with Bruce Guthro and "Seinn o" with Mary Jane Lamond and Alyth McCormack in the CBC Television Special Celtic Electric.

Rankin's voice has been featured on Will Ackerman's Grammy Award winning record Hearing Voices (2001), Fiona Joy Hawkins' 600 Years in a Moment (2013) and Christmas Joy(2011), Franklin McKay's song "Destiny" (2011) and Peter Jennison's song "Remember Me (Sgt. MacKenzie)" (2014).

Rankin's rendition of "Chì mi na mòrbheanna" is featured in the soundtrack to the 1995 film Margaret's Museum.

On December 18, 2024, she was named to the Order of Canada by Governor General Mary Simon, with the rank of Officer.

== Solo (2012–present) ==
In 2012, Rankin began working on writing songs for her first solo record. She formed a writing partnership with David Tyson and her debut solo album, A Fine Line, was released April 1, 2016.

The first single from A Fine Line, a cover of Tears for Fears' 1985 hit "Everybody Wants to Rule the World" featuring Halifax-based rapper Quake Matthews was released January 22, 2016.

A Fine Line was Nominated for a 2017 Juno Award for Adult Contemporary Album of the Year and 2017 East Coast Music Awards for Folk Recording of the Year and Fan's Choice Video of the Year (for "We Walk As One.")

Rankin has released music videos for three singles from A Fine Line, "Everybody Wants to Rule the World" and "We Walk as One," directed by Scott Simpson of Playmaker Films and "Titanically," directed by Thom Fitzgerald. "Titanically" is inspired by the story of The Titanic's bandmaster Wallace Hartley's violin, which was found in an attic in 2005 and auctioned for 1.7 million dollars in 2013. The music video for "Titanically" was nominated for a 2018 East Coast Music Award and a 2018 Music Nova Scotia Award.

As a solo artist Rankin has performed in venues throughout Atlantic Canada and in Ontario, Manitoba, Saskatchewan, Alberta, and British Columbia. She has headlined the Lunenburg Folk Harbour Festival, The Kempt Shore Acoustic Festival, and Harmony Bazaar, hosted Songwriters' Circles at the East Coast Music Awards and Deep Roots Festival in Wolfville, co-hosted the ECMAs with Ashley MacIsaac, and performed at a barbecue for Prime Minister Justin Trudeau in New Glasgow.

As a participant on the Canada C3 Expedition in June 2017, Heather wrote and recorded the song "River of Nations" with Alex Cuba and Andrea Menard, a song inspired by the journey toward reconciliation between Indigenous and non-Indigenous peoples in Canada.

Her second solo album, Imagine, was released on December 1, 2017.

== Discography ==
=== Albums ===
Title	Details
A Fine Line	Release date: April 1, 2016; Label: Cadence Music Group
Imagine	Release date: December 1, 2017; Label: Back Street Music Ltd.

=== Music videos ===
Year	Video	Director
2016	"Everybody Wants to Rule the World"	Scott Simpson
2016	"We Walk As One"	Scott Simpson
2017	"Titanically"	Thom Fitzgerald

== Awards and nominations ==
Year	Association	Category	Result
2017	East Coast Music Awards	Folk Recording of the Year (A Fine Line)	Nominated
2017	East Coast Music Awards	Fan's Choice Video of the Year- "We Walk As One" (director Scott Simpson)	Nominated
2017	Juno Awards	Adult Contemporary Album of the Year- A Fine Line	Nominated
2018	East Coast Music Awards	Video of the Year- "Titanically" (directed by Thom Fitzgerald)	Nominated
2018	Music Nova Scotia Awards	Video of the Year- "Titanically" (directed by Thom Fitzgerald)	Nominated
