= Souvenir: 1989—1998 =

Compilation album by The Rankins
- Released: April 1, 2003
- Genre: Country, folk
- Label: EMI

The Rankins chronology
| Uprooted (1998) | Souvenir: 1989—1998 (2003) | Reunion (2007) |

Professional ratings
Review scores
| Source | Rating |
|---|---|
| Allmusic | 4/5 stars |

Souvenir: 1989—1998 is the second greatest hits album by Canadian folk music group The Rankins. It was released by EMI on April 1, 2003. The album peaked at number 61 on the Canadian Albums Chart.

== Track listing ==
=== Disc 1 ===
1. "You Feel The Same Way Too" (Jimmy Rankin) – 4:51
2. "Borders and Time" (Jimmy Rankin) – 3:22
3. "Rise Again" (Leon Dubinsky) – 3:46
4. "North Country" (Jimmy Rankin) – 3:36
5. "Orangedale Whistle" (Jimmy Rankin) – 3:26
6. "The River" (Cookie Rankin) – 3:33
7. "Let It Go" (Jimmy Rankin) – 3:59
8. "Maybe You're Right" (C. Rankin, Gordie Sampson) – 4:15
9. "Bells" (Jimmy Rankin) – 3:28
10. "Gillis Mountain" (Raylene Rankin) – 3:04
11. "Forty Days and Nights" (Jimmy Rankin) – 3:24
12. "Movin' On" (Jimmy Rankin) – 3:33
13. "Roving Gypsy Boy" (Jimmy Rankin) – 4:08

=== Disc 2 ===
1. "Fare Thee Well Love" (Jimmy Rankin) – 4:30
2. "O Tha Mo Dhuil Ruit (Oh How I Love Thee)" (Traditional) – 2:58
3. "Greenberg Medley" (David Greenberg) – 4:11
4. "Down by the Sally Gardens" (Traditional, William Butler Yeats) – 5:12
5. "Grey Dusk of Eve" (David Field, The Rankin Family) – 3:06
6. "Christy Campbell Medley" (John Morris Rankin, Traditional) – 4:38
7. "An Innis Àigh (The Happy Isle)" (Traditional) – 3:30
8. "Parlour Medley" (John Morris Rankin, Traditional) – 5:56
9. "Mull River Shuffle" (Jimmy Rankin) – 7:50
10. "Farewell to Lochaber" (Traditional) – 3:39
11. "Weddings, Wakes and Funerals" (Kevin MacMichael, Jimmy Rankin) – 4:41

== Chart performance ==
| Chart (2003) | Peak position |
|---|---|
| Canadian Albums Chart | 61 |
