= Collection (The Rankin Family album) =

Greatest hits album by The Rankin Family
- Released: 1996
- Genres: Country, folk
- Length: 56:41
- Label: EMI

The Rankin Family chronology
Endless Seasons (1995)	Collection (1996)	Do You Hear…Christmas (1997)

Professional ratings
Review scores
Source	Rating
Allmusic	4.5/5 stars

Collection is the first greatest hits album by Canadian folk music group The Rankin Family. It was released by EMI in 1996. The album peaked at number 1 on the RPM Country Albums chart.

== Track listing ==
1. "Roving Gypsy Boy" (Remix) (Jimmy Rankin) – 4:05
2. "Borders and Time" (J. Rankin) – 3:23
3. "Down by the Sally Gardens" (Traditional, William Butler Yeats) – 5:15
4. "Christy Campbell Medley" (Traditional) – 4:37
5. "Orangedale Whistle" (J. Rankin) – 3:25
6. "Rise Again" (Leon Dubinsky) – 3:47
7. "You Feel the Same Way Too" (J. Rankin) – 4:50
8. "Grey Dusk of Eve (Portobello)" (David Field, Rankin Family, Traditional) – 3:07
9. "North Country" (J. Rankin) – 3:35
10. "Fail Il" (Traditional) – 2:37
11. "Gillis Mountain" (Raylene Rankin) – 3:04
12. "Fare Thee Well Love" (J. Rankin) – 4:29
13. "Mull River Shuffle" (J. Rankin) – 7:50 (Live cut from a show in Vancouver)

== Chart performance ==
Chart (1996)	Peak position
Canadian RPM Country Albums	1
Canadian RPM Top Albums	14
