= North Country (album) =

Studio album by The Rankin Family
- Released: August 24, 1993
- Genre: Country, folk
- Length: 45:12
- Label: EMI
- Producer: Chad Irschick

The Rankin Family chronology
| Fare Thee Well Love (1990) | North Country (1993) | Grey Dusk of Eve (1995) |

Professional ratings
Review scores
| Source | Rating |
|---|---|
| Allmusic | 4/5 stars |

North Country is the third studio album by Canadian folk music group The Rankin Family. It was released by EMI on August 24, 1993. The album peaked at number 1 on the RPM Country Albums chart. A revised version was released in the United States in 1994. This version contained material from the original North Country album, 1992's Fare Thee Well Love and the Grey Dusk of Eve EP.

== Track listing ==
=== Original release ===
1. "North Country" (Jimmy Rankin) - 3:36
2. "Oich U Agus H-Iuraibh Éile (Love Song)" (Traditional) - 3:01
3. "Borders and Time" (Jimmy Rankin) - 3:23
4. "Mull River Shuffle" (Donald Angus Beaton, J. S. Skinner, Jimmy Rankin, Wilfred Gillis) - 4:54
5. "Lisa Brown" (Jimmy Rankin) - 3:03
6. "Ho Ro Mo Nighean Donn Bhòidheach" (Traditional) - 4:41
7. "Tramp Miner" (Jimmy Rankin) - 3:18
8. "Rise Again" (Leon Dubinsky) - 3:47
9. "Leis An Lurgainn" (Traditional) - 3:04
10. "Christy Campbell Medley" (Traditional) - 4:40
11. "Saved in the Arms" (Jimmy Rankin) - 3:45
12. "Johnny Tulloch: Betty Lou's Reel" (Beaton, Jimmy Rankin) - 3:02
13. "Turn That Boat Around" (Jimmy Rankin) - 3:33

=== Personnel (Musicians) ===
- Rankin Family - Primary Artist
- Scott Alexander - Bass
- Claude Desjardins - Synthesizer, Percussion
- Michael Francis - Acoustic Guitar, Dobro, Mandolin, Electric Guitar, Mandola
- Brian Leonard - Percussion, Drums
- Boko Suzuki - Synthesizer
- Tom Szczesniak - Bass, Accordion
- Dave MacIsaac - Acoustic Guitar
- Howie MacDonald - Fiddle, Piano
- John Morris Rankin - Fiddle, Piano
- Steve Smith - Pedal Steel Guitar
- Cookie Rankin - Vocals, Background Vocals
- Heather Rankin - Vocals, Background Vocals
- Jimmy Rankin - Acoustic Guitar, Vocals, Background Vocals, Snare Drums
- Raylene Rankin - Vocals, Background Vocals
- Ray Parker - Organ, Synthesizer

=== Revised release ===
1. "North Country" (Jimmy Rankin) – 3:35
2. "Borders and Time" (Jimmy Rankin) – 3:23
3. "Orangedale Whistle" (Jimmy Rankin) – 3:25
4. "Ho Ro Mo Nighean Down Bhóidheach" (Traditional) – 4:41
5. "Gillis Mountain" (Raylene Rankin) – 3:04
6. "Fare Thee Well Love" (Jimmy Rankin) – 4:29
7. "Christy Campbell Medley" (John Morris Rankin, Traditional) – 3:05
8. "Tramp Miner" (Jimmy Rankin) – 3:18
9. "Rise Again" (Leon Dubinsky) – 3:47
10. "Grey Dusk of Eve" (Dave Field, The Rankin Family) – 3:07
11. "Fisherman's Son" (Jimmy Rankin) – 3:30
12. "Tell My Ma" (Traditional) – 2:15
13. "Turn That Boat Around" (Jimmy Rankin) – 3:33

== Chart performance ==
| Chart (1993) | Peak position |
|---|---|
| Canadian RPM Country Albums | 1 |
| Canadian RPM Top Albums | 7 |
