= You Feel the Same Way Too =

Single by The Rankin Family

from the album Endless Seasons
- Released: August 1995
- Genre: Country, folk
- Length: 4:50
- Label: EMI
- Songwriter: Jimmy Rankin
- Producers: John Jennings, The Rankin Family

The Rankin Family singles chronology
"Grey Dusk of Eve" (1995)	"You Feel the Same Way Too" (1995)	"The River" (1996)

"You Feel the Same Way Too" is a song recorded by Canadian music group The Rankin Family. It was released in August 1995 as the lead single from their fourth studio album, Endless Seasons. It peaked in the top 20 on the RPM Adult Contemporary Tracks and Country charts.

== Music video ==
The music video was directed by George Dougherty.

== Chart performance ==
Chart (1995)	Peak position
Canada Top Singles (RPM)	46
Canada Adult Contemporary (RPM)	14
Canada Country Singles (RPM)	14

=== Year-end charts ===
Chart (1995)	Position
Canada Adult Contemporary Tracks (RPM)	93
