= North Country =

North Country may refer to:

== Places ==
- North Country, Cornwall, England
- North Country, the northern third of New Hampshire, U.S.
  - Great North Woods Region (New Hampshire)
- North Country (New York), a region of Upstate New York
  - North Country Community College, Saranac Lake
  - North Country School, Lake Placid
- Northern England

== Other uses ==
- North Country (album), a 1993 album by The Rankin Family
  - "North Country" (song), the title track
- North Country, a song by Gillian Welch and David Rawlings: see Woodland (album)
- North Country (film), a 2005 American drama film
  - North Country (soundtrack), a soundtrack album from the film
- "North Country (poem)" a 1939 poem by Kenneth Slessor

== See also ==
- North Country Trail, an American long-distance foot trail from New York to North Dakota
- North Country Cinema, a Canadian media arts collective
- North Country Hospital, Newport City, Vermont, U.S.
- North Country Beagle, an early breed of dog
- "Girl from the North Country", a 1963 song written by Bob Dylan (which has some similarities to the folk song "Scarborough Fair")
- Music from the North Country – The Jayhawks Anthology, a compilation album released by the American alt-country band The Jayhawks
