= Margaret Malandruccolo =

Canadian photographer and music video director

Margaret Malandruccolo is a Canadian photographer and music video director primarily living in Los Angeles who specializes in portraiture, album photography, and fashion photography. She has directed over a hundred music videos and has won two Juno Awards and four CCMA Awards.

She has done photography for multiple books, commercials, and musical albums including Stephen Fearing's That's How I Walk (2002), Your Man (2006) by Josh Turner, Edge of Day (2007) by Jimmy Rankin, Get Me Some (2000) by The Jeff Healey Band, 1UP! (2009) by illScarlett, A Place Called Love (2010) by Johnny Reid, and Some People Change (2006) by Montgomery Gentry.

She won Album Design of the Year along with Marina Dempster, Nelson Garcia, and Steve Goode, at the Juno Awards of 2003 for Exit (2002) by k-os. She was one of the photographers for the album Tangents: The Tea Party Collection (2001), which won a Best Album Design award at the Juno Awards of 2001. In 1999 she was nominated, along with David Ashcroft and Ivan Otis for a Best Album Design at the Juno Awards of 1999 for the album Three Seeds by New Meanies. In 2000 she was nominated, along with Garnet Armstrong, Mark Bartkiw, and Amo3ba Corp, for a Best Album Design on the album Blue Green Orange by I Mother Earth.

She has directed music videos including:

- "I've Seen a Little" and "Testify" (2012, nominated for Video of the Year at Juno Awards of 2013) as well as "So Let's Go" (2015), by Alan Doyle
- "This Girl" (2008), by Beverley Mahood
- "Put Me On" (2006), by Swollen Members feat. Everlast
- "Still" (2003), "I Feel a Sin Comin' On" (2004), and "She Ain't Missin' Missin' Me" (2005), by Jason McCoy
- "Homeless Heart" (2005), by Amanda Stott
- "Gypsy Boots" (2009), and "Some Songs" (2014), by Terri Clark
- "Dress Rehearsal" (2005), by Carolyn Dawn Johnson
- "Take the Week Off" (2013) and "Pass It Around" (2014), by Deric Ruttan
- "It's Okay to Cry" (2005), by Amanda Wilkinson
- "Whole Lotta History" (2005), by Girls Aloud
- "Me" and "Almost" (2007) by Tamia
- "I'm a Road Hammer" (2005), "Girl on the Billboard" (2006), "Get On Down the Road" (2013), and "Mud" (2014) by The Road Hammers
- "Butterfly" and "California Dreamer" (2004), as well as "The Hurtin' Part" (2012) and "Cool Car" (2014) by Jimmy Rankin
- "1929" (2011), by Tara Oram
- "You Can Let Go" (2008), by Crystal Shawanda
- "The Last of a Dying Breed" (2006), by Neal McCoy
- "The Heartache" (1996), by Lawnie Wallace
- "Little Lie" (2011), Lindi Ortega
- "The Talkin' Song Repair Blues" (2005), by Alan Jackson
- "Misery Loves Company" and "When It Ain't Rainin'" (2009), "Tumblin' Tears" and "The Day I Fall" (2010), "Maybe" (2012), and "Run Run Run" (2013), by One More Girl
- "Walk a Little Straighter" (2003), by Billy Currington
- "Witch Doktor" (1995), by Armand Van Helden
- "A Heart Like Mine" (2012) and "The Back of Your Hand" (2003), by Dwight Yoakam
- "I'm Your Man" (2007), by Ryan Laird
- "Go Back" (2014), by Leah Daniels
- "Today I'm Gonna Try and Change the World" (2010), "Fire It Up" (2012, nominated for Video of the Year at Juno Awards of 2013), "You Still Own Me" (2004), and "Go Tell It on the Mountain" (2014), by Johnny Reid
- "In This House" (2011), by The Stellas
- "Started with a Song" and "Raise Your Glass" (2013), by Brett Kissel
- "Bounty" (2013), and "Upside Down" (2015), by Dean Brody
- "Take the Week Off" (2013), by Deric Ruttan
- "Anything at All" (2012), by Autumn Hill
- "Fast Car" (2006) and "Papa Come Quick" (2007), by The Wilkinsons
- "One Good Friend" (2005), by George Canyon
