= Forty Days =

Forty Days or 40 Days may refer to:

== Christianity ==
- Great Lent § The Great Forty Days
- Forty days in the desert, the Temptation of Christ

== Books ==
- The Forty Days of Musa Dagh (German: Die vierzig Tage des Musa Dagh), a 1933 novel by Franz Werfel

== Music ==
- 40 Days, an album by the Wailin' Jennys, 2004
- "40 Days", a song by Blessthefall from Awakening, 2011
- "Forty Days", a 1959 song by Ronnie Hawkins and the cover of "Thirty Days" by Chuck Berry, 1955
- "Forty Days and Forty Nights", a song by Muddy Waters, 1956
- "Forty Days and Nights", a song by the Rankin Family, 1996
- "40 Days", a song by Slowdive from Souvlaki, 1993
- "40 Days", an instrumental song by Dave Brubeck, 1965
- "Forty Days", a song by Streetlight Manifesto from Somewhere in the Between, 2007
