= Glenn Graham =

Glen or Glenn Graham may refer to:

- Glenn Graham (fiddler) (born 1974), Cape Breton fiddler
- Glen Graham, percussionist for the group Blind Melon
- Glenn Graham (athlete) (1904–1986), 1924 Olympic silver medalist in the pole vault
