= Ryan Laird =

Canadian country music singer-songwriter (born 1984)

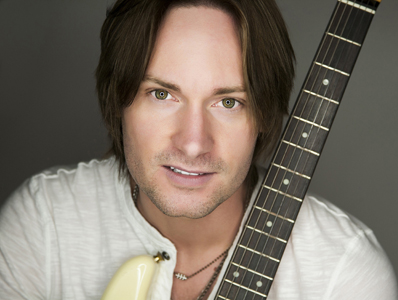
- Ryan Laird in 2014

Background information
- Born: Ryan Laird; March 8, 1984 (age 41); Toronto, Ontario, Canada
- Origin: Fergus, Ontario, Canada
- Genres: Country
- Occupations: Singer-songwriter, musician, producer, philanthropist
- Instruments: Vocals, guitar, piano, drums, harmonica
- Years active: 2002-present
- Labels: On Ramp Records, Warner Music Canada, Studio Gold Nashville, Sorus Entertainment Canada
- Website: www.ryanlaird.com

Ryan Laird (born March 8, 1984) is a Canadian country music singer-songwriter. He received recognition and media attention across The United States and Canada in December 2008 after putting up a billboard on Nashville, Tennessee's music row asking Taylor Swift to produce his album.

== Early life and education ==
Laird was born in Toronto, Ontario to Laird and Laurie Schneider. He has one younger brother and one younger sister. He grew up on a 100-acre beef farm in Belwood, just outside Fergus, Ontario. He studied jazz guitar at Humber College in Toronto.

== Musical career ==
Laird moved to Nashville at 18, and a few years later signed a publishing deal with Cherry Lane Music Publishing. He signed his first recording contract with CMT (Canada) and Sony Music Entertainment Canada in 2011 and performed his first showcase as part of the label during the Canadian Country Music Association Awards.

In 2008, Laird put up a billboard on Nashville, Tennessee's music row asking Taylor Swift to produce his album. Located at Broadway & 17th Ave, the billboard displayed Laird in a classroom holding a note reading “Hey Taylor - I LOVE your music. Will you produce my album?”

On March 28, 2011, Laird released a music video for his single "I'm Your Man" which charted at No. 10 on the CMT Cross Canada Countdown on July 30/2011. The radio single peaked at No. 10 on the Canada Country radio chart in July 2011 and was nominated for a Canadian Radio Music Award.

In 2012, Laird was nominated for two Canadian Country Music Awards: CMT Video of the Year and The Rising Star Award.

While on the CMT Canada and Sony Music Canada label roster in 2012, the record label released Laird’s second single, “She Was The One”, to Canadian Country radio. The song went on to reach No. 46 on the Nielsen Broadcast Data Systems Canada Country Chart. Later that year, Laird was invited to be a guest artist on the CMT Canada reality TV show, "CMT On The Beach". Along with fellow Canadian recording artists Dean Brody and Deric Ruttan, Laird participated in contest events and performed a concert on the beach in Jamaica for fans.

That same year, Laird was a featured artist on CMT’s XM Sessions.

In 2012, Laird signed a new record deal with On Ramp Records, an EMI Music Canada distributed label partner. Laird’s third radio single release, “Girl Crazy”, was serviced to Canadian country radio on April 17, 2012. The song reached No. 43 on the Nielsen BDS Canada Country Chart and was one of four singles on Laird’s self-titled debut album. A music video filmed on Santa Monica and Venice Beach, California, was added into rotation on CMT Music Canada.

The following year, Laird was approached by fellow Canadian country artist, Leah Daniels, to record a duet titled “Where Do I Go”. The song was written by composer, Ashley Monroe, from the Pistol Annies and Sam Ellis, a member of Hunter Hayes band. Ellis also produced the track. A music video was filmed in Uxbridge, Ontario.

On August 14, 2014, Laird signed a Nashville publishing and artist development deal with Studio Gold Music, Inc.

Laird has been interviewed on several radio shows, including by Big D & Bubba, Blair Garner After Midnite and GAC Nights.

== Philanthropy ==
Laird is actively involved in the BiggerThanThat! Movement, performing motivational message driven music concerts at schools with the initiative to inspire youth to dream big and never allow negative influences to stand in the way of success and happiness in their lives. Laird composed the campaign theme song, “Bigger Than That”, with Dave Thomson from Wave (band), which was written to mimic the BiggerThanThat! Movement message to children. The program has visited over 250,000 youth across Canada.

== Tours ==
In 2011, Laird went on his first national tour as the opening act for George Canyon. In 2012, Laird was the opening act for Alan Jackson, Dierks Bentley, and Emerson Drive tours. In 2013, Laird was an opening act on the Terri Clark tour.

== Discography ==
=== Studio albums ===
Title	Details
Ryan Laird	Release date: June 5, 2012; Label: On Ramp Records/EMI Music Canada
Bigger Than That	Release date: November 16, 2014; Label: Studio Gold Music

=== Singles ===
Year	Single	Album
2011	"I'm Your Man"	Ryan Laird
2011	"She Was the One"	Ryan Laird
2012	"Girl Crazy"	Ryan Laird
2013	"Where Do I Go" (with Leah Daniels)	Ryan Laird
2014	"Love's Long Gone"	Bigger Than That
2015	"Summertime Girl"	Singles
2016	"Wear Me Out"	Singles
2017	"Gamble On Love"	Singles
2020	"Make It Work"	Single
2021	"If I Ever Lost You"	Single
2022	"Eileen"	Single
2023	"Legacy"	Single
2023	"Cosmos"	Single
2024	"Clapton"	Single

=== Music videos ===
Year	Single	Director
2008	"Luv Me"	Thaddeus Fenton, Scotty Kipfer
2011	"I'm Your Man"	Margaret Malandruccolo
2011	"She Was the One"	Sean Hooper
2012	"Girl Crazy"	Jordan Eady
2012	"Where Do I Go" (with Leah Daniels)	Tim Deegan
2014	"Love's Long Gone"	Matthew Ninaber
2016	"Wear Me Out"	Jacqueline Nicoll
2017	"Gamble On Love"	Jacqueline Nicoll
2020	"Make It Work"	Jacqueline Nicoll, Keagan Fairbrother
2022	"Eileen"	Motion Crowd
2023	"Legacy"	Ryan Laird
2023	"Cosmos"	Lorenzo Dutoni, Ryan Laird
2024	"Clapton"	Paul Brian, Thomas Kuecks

== Awards and nominations ==
Year	Association	Category	Result
2012	Canadian Country Music Association	Rising Star	Nominated
2012	Canadian Country Music Association	CMT Video of the Year – "I'm Your Man"	Nominated
2012	Canadian Radio Music Award	CRMA Country Single of the Year - "I'm Your Man"	Nominated
