= Grey Dusk of Eve =

EP by The Rankin Family
- Released: March 1995
- Genre: Country, folk
- Length: 18:07
- Label: EMI

The Rankin Family chronology
North Country (1993)	Grey Dusk of Eve (1995)	Endless Seasons (1995)

Professional ratings
Review scores
Source	Rating
Allmusic	4.5/5 stars

Grey Dusk of Eve is a limited-edition EP by Canadian folk music group The Rankin Family, released by EMI in 1995. It peaked at number 29 on the RPM Top Albums chart. The EP was certified gold by the CRIA for sales of 50,000 copies.

The EP's title track featured a collaboration with Liam Ó Maonlaí of the Irish group Hothouse Flowers.

== Track listing ==
1. "Grey Dusk of Eve (Portobello)" (David Field, Rankin Family, Traditional) – 3:08
2. "The Ballad of Malcolm Murray" (Jimmy Rankin) – 3:17
3. "An Teid Thu Leam a Mhairi" (Iain Munro) – 4:11
4. "Twin Fiddle Medley" (Traditional) – 3:58
5. "Sir James Baird" (Traditional) – 3:33

== Chart performance ==
Chart (1995)	Peak position
Canadian RPM Top Albums	29
