= God Made Me Funky =

Canadian funk band

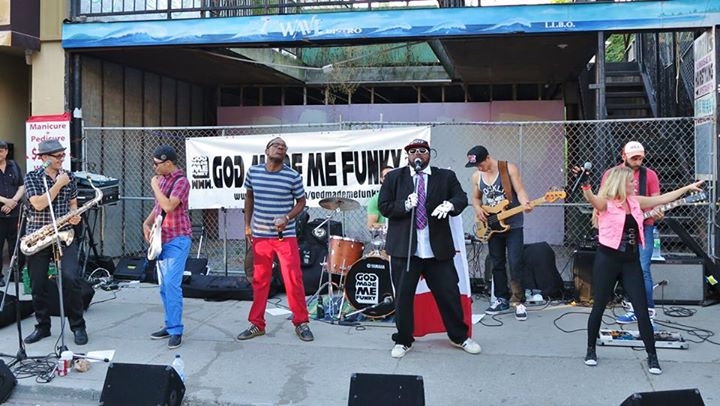
- God Made Me Funky, May 2014

Background information
- Origin: Toronto, Ontario, Canada
- Genres: Funk, nu-funk, hip hop
- Years active: 1996–present
- Labels: MapleMusic
- Members: PHATT Al, Dana Jean Phoenix, Ben Miller, Kaybe, Rich Grossman, Danny Argyle, Arthur Kerekes, Alan Witz

God Made Me Funky (GMMF) is a Canadian funk music group, formed in 1996 in Toronto. The group started as an "instrumental funk fusion experiment", and developed a popular following in the Toronto music scene.

Their self-titled debut album was released in 2005, and was supported by a cross-Canada concert tour and airplay on CBC Radio 3.

Their second album, We Can All Be Free, was released in 2007, and garnered a Juno Award nomination for R&B/Soul Recording of the Year at the Juno Awards of 2008. The album featured guest appearances by Maestro, Michie Mee and Thrust. The single "Won More Time" charted in the top 10 on Canadian modern rock and campus radio charts and the top 100 on the contemporary hit radio charts, and the single "Luv T'Day" was featured on the soundtrack to the comedy film American Pie Presents: Beta House.

Their third album, Enter the Beat, was released in 2008.

The band has collaborated with a variety of female vocalists both on tour and in the recording studio, including Breanne Arigo, Leah Daniels, former Canadian Idol winner Melissa O'Neil and Dana Jean Phoenix.

Their music has also been used in advertisements for Parmalat and Coors Light.

Their most recent album, Funky, Fly, N' Free, was released in 2015.

== Awards and nominations ==
- Best RnB Band, Toronto Independent Music Awards 2005
- Nominated for Favourite Urban Artist/Group/Duo of the Year, Canadian Independent Music Awards, 2007
- Nominated for R&B/Soul Recording of the Year, Juno Awards, 2008

== Albums ==
- God Made Me Funky (2005)
- We Can All Be Free (2007)
- Enter the Beat (2008)
- Welcome to Nu Funktonia (2009)
- Vive Le NuFunk (2012)
- Funky Fly N' Free (2015)
