= Kinnon Beaton =

Canadian musician (born 1956)

- Born: March 26, 1956 (age 70)
- Origin: Mabou, Inverness County, Nova Scotia, Canada
- Occupation: Fiddler

Kinnon Beaton (born March 26, 1956) is a Canadian musician from Mabou, Nova Scotia. He is the son of Donald Angus Beaton and Elizabeth MacEachen, plays the fiddle in the Scottish music genre famous on Cape Breton Island and wrote a book of violin music called The Beaton Collection.
