= Movin' On (The Rankins song) =

Single by The Rankins

from the album Uprooted
- Released: 1998
- Genre: Country, folk
- Length: 3:34
- Label: EMI
- Songwriter: Jimmy Rankin
- Producer: George Massenburg

The Rankins singles chronology
"Roving Gypsy Boy" (1996)	"Movin' On" (1998)	"Maybe You're Right" (1998)

"Movin' On" is a song recorded by Canadian music group The Rankins. It was released in 1998 as the first single from their fifth studio album, Uprooted. It peaked in the top 10 on the RPM Country Tracks chart.

== Chart performance ==
Chart (1998)	Peak position
Canada Country Singles (RPM)	7

=== Year-end charts ===
Chart (1998)	Position
Canada Country Tracks (RPM)	57
