= The Red Shoe =

Restaurant in Nova Scotia

Coordinates: 46.072519°N 61.391017°W

The Red Shoe Pub is a restaurant located in Mabou, Nova Scotia, Canada. Open seasonally, it has been operated by Canadian musical group The Rankin Family since May 2005, and is a regular host to both local and visiting Celtic musicians. Artists such as Buddy MacMaster and Glenn Graham have played at the Red Shoe in recent years.

The pub takes its name from a reel composed by Dan R. MacDonald. Though the exterior of the pub was initially decorated by two iconic red shoes, both have since disappeared, the second one having likely been stolen in September 2012.
