= Leah Daniels =

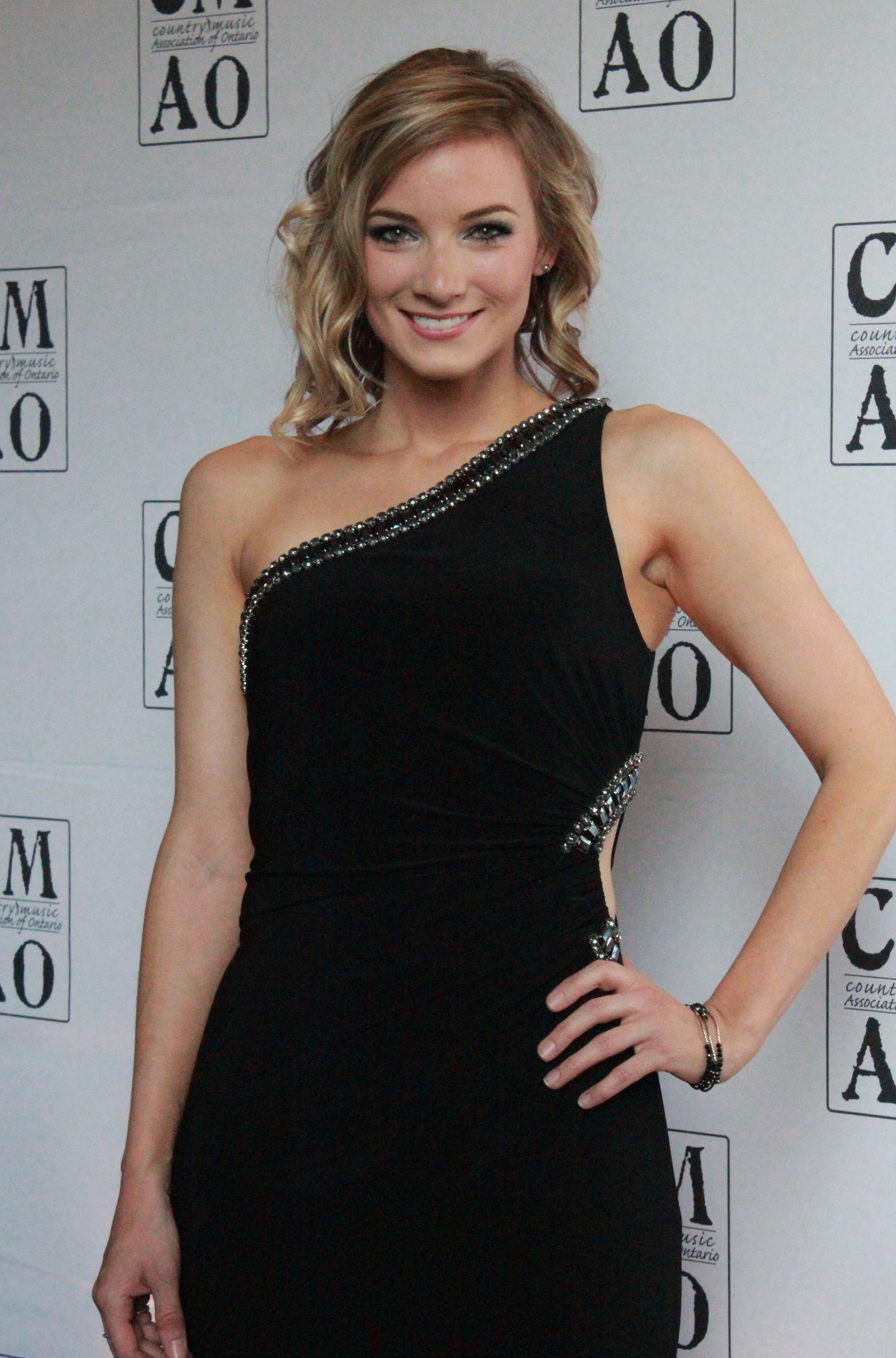

Background information
- Born: December 25, 1987 (age 38)
- Origin: Uxbridge, Ontario, Canada
- Genres: Pop; country
- Occupations: Singer-songwriter, musician
- Instruments: Vocals; piano; guitar
- Years active: 1996–present
- Label: Independent

Leah Daniels (born December 25, 1987) is a Canadian country music singer and songwriter. She is an independent recording artist. Her self-titled debut was released in November 2011 and her debut single was released in February 2012. She released her first music video titled "Suspicious Minds" on November 2, 2011 on CMT, Canada.

== Early life and education ==
Leah Daniels grew up on a small farm in Uxbridge, Ontario. Daniels was constantly surrounded by music and singing. She was introduced to music at an early age by a grandfather who taught her how to yodel and an uncle who schooled her in classic rock. She began to write songs at age 12 preferring music that incorporated a country pop music sound.

Daniels began performing as a young girl in choirs and singing competitions. Her first exposure to country music came at age 10 singing at the CNE Open Country singing contest. While attending school in Uxbridge, Ontario Leah began to perform in musicals. She performed roles as Eliza Doolittle in "My Fair Lady", Sandy in "Grease" and Anita in "West Side Story". Her first professional singing job was at a dinner theatre called, "Al Capone’s Birthday". Soon after this at age 18 Leah was hired to work as a singer/dancer in the shows "School of Rock" and "Twistin’ to the Sixties" at a theme park called Canada's Wonderland. Here Leah met and began to sing with the musicians who form her current band.

In 2005 Daniels studied musical theatre at Sheridan College and the following year she studied voice at Humber College. At this point in 2007 Leah left school to pursue her ambition of writing, recording and releasing her own original music. In 2008, she recorded and released her first 3-song Demo "No Escape". It was considered to be mostly pop/R&B but one song "Perfect World" stood out as almost having a country flavour. The positive feedback to "Perfect World" inspired Leah to focus on country music writing at this point.

== Career ==
In 2010, Daniels began to perform regularly as a country artist. She won the Durham Region Music Award for Country Artist of the Year. She also performed at the Havelock Country Jamboree alongside such music legends as Dwight Yoakam and Tanya Tucker. She followed this with a September 2010 appearance in the New Artist Showcase at the 2010 CCMA Music Week.

She began to build a motivated fan base on Facebook, Twitter and YouTube recording several music videos and posting them. Leah also began to write and record her debut CD with friend, musician and producer Sam Ellis. Sam is known as a member of the Hunter Hayes Band. The recording was finished in mid-2011 and the first song/video, "Suspicious Minds" was released to CMT Canada and YouTube in November 2011.'Suspicious Minds" was a remake of the Elvis Presley classic song of the same title.

Leah made her debut TV appearance on March 3, 2012 on the CTV Saskatchewan Telemiracle broadcast. Leah Daniels released her second song/video, "One Night" to CMT Canada and YouTube June 8, 2012.'

One song from her new CD, "Still" has been featured on the CMT (Canada) show "Unstable".

=== Other projects ===
Daniels performed with the tour act God Made Me Funky during 2008 and 2009. She still performs occasionally with them. Leah recorded on the group's 4th album "Welcome to Nufunktonia", released in 2009. In 2010 she performed and toured with a "Hannah Montana" tribute show. That same year she also appeared as a background vocalist for the Canadian Band, IllScarlett for their performance at the 2010 Winter Olympics.

== Discography ==
=== Studio albums ===
Title	Details
What It Feels Like	Release date: October 23, 2015; Label: Spin Music

Title	Details
The Story	Release date: May 25, 2018; Label: LDM Entertainment

=== Singles ===
Year	Single	Peak positions	Album
Year	Single	CAN Country	Album
2011	"Suspicious Minds"	—	—N/a
2012	"One Night"	—	—N/a
2012	"Where Do I Go" (with Ryan Laird)	—	—N/a
2014	"Go Back"	20	What It Feels Like
2015	"Dream Without You"	—	What It Feels Like
2015	"Old Piano"	—	What It Feels Like
2016	"Your Kiss Is Killing Me"	—	What It Feels Like
2016	"Salt Water"	69	What It Feels Like
2018	"Slow Hand"(with Jason Benoit)	61	—N/a
2018	"1st"	—	The Story
2019	"Together"	—	The Story
2019	"—" denotes releases that did not chart		

=== Music videos ===
Year	Video	Director
2011	"Suspicious Minds"	Eady Bros.
2012	"One Night"	Skye Sweetnam
2012	"Where Do I Go" (with Ryan Laird)	Tim Deegan
2013	"We Got Snow"	Tim Deegan
2014	"Go Back"	Margaret Malandruccolo
2015	"Dream Without You"	Tim Deegan
2015	"Old Piano"	Tim Deegan
2016	"Your Kiss Is Killing Me"	Tim Deegan
2016	"Salt Water"	Tim Deegan
2018	"1st"	Tim Deegan
2019	"Together"	Tim Deegan

=== Other album appearances ===
Year	Song	Album
2011	"All Songs"	Welcome to Newfunktonia, God Made Me Funky

== Awards and nominations ==
Year	Association	Category	Result
2010	Durham Region Music Award	Country Artist of the Year	Won
2013	Canadian Country Music Association	Interactive Artist of the Year	Nominated
2014	Canadian Country Music Association	Interactive Artist of the Year	Nominated
2015	Canadian Country Music Association	Rising Star	Nominated
2015	Canadian Country Music Association	Interactive Artist of the Year	Nominated
2015	Country Music Association of Ontario	Rising Star	Won
2015	Country Music Association of Ontario	Songwriter of the Year (shared with Beverley Mahood and Bruce Wallace)	Nominated
2016	Canadian Radio Music Awards	Factor's Breakthrough Artist of the Year	Won
2016	Country Music Association of Ontario	Female Artist of the Year	Won
2016	Country Music Association of Ontario	Songwriter of the Year (shared with Beverley Mahood and Patricia Conroy)	Nominated
2016	Country Music Association of Ontario	Single of the Year – Go Back	Nominated
2016	Country Music Association of Ontario	Album of the Year – What It Feels Like	Nominated
2016	Country Music Association of Ontario	Video of the Year– Old Piano	Nominated
2016	Canadian Country Music Association	Interactive Artist of the Year	Nominated
2017	Country Music Association of Ontario	Female Artist of the Year	Nominated
2017	Country Music Association of Ontario	Producer of the Year (shared with The Agenda)	Nominated
2019	Country Music Association of Ontario	Female Artist of the Year	Nominated
2019	Country Music Association of Ontario	Album of the Year – The Story	Nominated
2019	Country Music Association of Ontario	Video of the Year – 1st	Nominated
