= These Are the Moments =

2009 studio album by the Rankin Family

Studio album by The Rankin Family
- Released: February 3, 2009
- Genre: Country, folk
- Length: 54:01
- Label: MapleMusic
- Producer: Steven MacKinnon

The Rankin Family chronology
Reunion (2007)	These Are the Moments (2009)

Singles from These Are the Moments
- 1. "Never Alone" Released: January 19, 2009; 2. "Straight Into Love" Released: May 4, 2009

These Are the Moments is the seventh studio album by Canadian folk music group The Rankin Family. It was released by MapleMusic Recordings on February 3, 2009. The album peaked at number 29 on the Canadian Albums Chart.

== Track listing ==
No.	Title	Length
1.	"Breathe Dream Pray Love" (single mix)	4:07
2.	"Straight Into Love"	4:01
3.	"My Only Wish"	3:55
4.	"Never Alone"	3:56
5.	"I Would"	3:41
6.	"Hopeville"	4:24
7.	"Fare Thee Well Love" (2008 sequel)	4:32
8.	"Nothing Like an Ocean"	3:28
9.	"Maybe You're Right"	4:16
10.	"Nothing to Believe In"	4:49
11.	"You Feel the Same Way Too"	4:53
12.	"Rise Again" (2008 sequel)	3:52
13.	"Breathe Dream Pray Love"	4:07
