= Donald Angus Beaton =

Canadian musician (1912–1982)

- Born: Donald Angus Beaton; April 20, 1912
- Origin: Mabou, Inverness County, Nova Scotia, Canada
- Died: July 29, 1982 (aged 70)
- Occupations: Fiddler, Composer

Donald Angus Beaton (April 20, 1912 – July 29, 1982) was a Canadian fiddler and composer associated with the Cape Breton musical tradition.

== Early life ==
Beaton was the son of Angus R. Beaton (Aonghas Raonuill) and Annie Belle Campbell. He worked as a blacksmith until the mid-1940s and later operated a taxi business in Mabou.

== Career ==
Beaton performed traditional Cape Breton fiddle tunes, as well as more than 50 of his own compositions. He was known as a dance fiddler. From the 1950s to the 1970s, Beaton and his wife, Elizabeth Beaton, were leading dance musicians in Inverness County, performing at numerous dances and concerts.

He published the albums The Beatons Of Mabou: Marches, Jigs, Strathspeys & Reels of the Highland Scot, Cape Breton Fiddle and Piano Music, and The Beaton Family of Mabou, which include his compositions performed by Beaton and members of his family, including Elizabeth Beaton, Joey Beaton, and Kinnon Beaton.

== Personal life ==
He and his wife Elizabeth Beaton had nine children. She died in 2011.

== Legacy ==
Several of Beaton’s children and grandchildren have continued the Cape Breton musical tradition. In 2004, Smithsonian Folkways released the CD album Cape Breton Fiddle and Piano Music: The Beaton Family of Mabou, which includes performances by members of the Beaton family, including Kinnon Beaton, Betty Lou Beaton, Mary (Beaton) Graham, Rodney MacDonald, Glenn Graham, Andrea Beaton and Allison Beaton. It also includes a special live track, previously recorded by Donald Angus and Elizabeth Beaton. The album, recorded at Soundpark Studios, was compiled and produced by Burt Feintuch.

== Discography ==
- The Beatons Of Mabou - Marches, Jigs, Strathspeys & Reels of the Highland Scot . Rounder LP 7011 The Smithsonian Folkways Recordings
- Cape Breton Fiddle and Piano Music, The Beaton Family of Mabou Smithsonian Folkways 40507
- Live at the House
- A Musical Legacy, Beaton Records, Vinyl LP, 1985

== Publications ==
- Donald Angus Beaton's Cape Breton Scottish Violin Music. Cranford Publishers. Englishtown, Nova Scotia. 1987.
