= An Drochaid =

Museum in Nova Scotia, Canada

An Drochaid Museum was formed in 1980 (45 years ago) and is located in Mabou, Nova Scotia. Built in 1875, it served as a general store and lecture hall until the late-1970s, then in the 1980s the building was purchased and used to create a heritage museum. The museum and Mabou Gaelic and Historical Society was founded to catalogue and support Canadian Gaelic language, its literature, and Scottish culture in the Mabou area. It also functions as keeping records of Mabou's history. The museum also functions as a cultural center, giving Highland step-dancing, fiddling and piano lessons, as well as holding Gaelic-language revival events and workshops.

"An Drochaid" means "The Bridge" in Canadian Gaelic, which is the name the earliest Highland settlers gave to Mabou.

== See also ==
- List of museums in Nova Scotia
