= Borders and Time =

Single by The Rankin Family

from the album North Country
- Released: 1994
- Genre: Country, folk
- Length: 3:23
- Label: EMI
- Songwriter: Jimmy Rankin
- Producer: Chad Irschick

The Rankin Family singles chronology
"North Country" (1993)	"Borders and Time" (1994)	"Tramp Miner" (1994)

"Borders and Time" is a song recorded by Canadian music group The Rankin Family. It was released in 1994 as the third single from their third studio album, North Country. It peaked in the top 10 on the RPM Adult Contemporary Tracks chart.

== Chart performance ==
Chart (1994)	Peak position
Canada Top Singles (RPM)	23
Canada Adult Contemporary (RPM)	10
Canada Country Singles (RPM)	21

=== Year-end charts ===
Chart (1994)	Position
Canada Adult Contemporary Tracks (RPM)	82
