= Glenn Graham (fiddler) =

Canadian musician, author and professor (born 1974)

- Born: 29 April 1974 (age 52); Judique, Cape Breton Island, Nova Scotia
- Education: St. Francis Xavier University (BA); Saint Mary's University (MA); Dalhousie University (PhD)
- Occupations: Fiddler; composer; author; professor
- Years active: 1990s–present
- Employers: Dalhousie University; Saint Francis Xavier University; Cape Breton University
- Style: Cape Breton fiddling; Gaelic music
- Musical career
- Labels: GlennRod Music; Bowbeat
- Website: glenngrahammusic.com

Glenn Graham (born 29 April 1974) is a Canadian fiddler, composer, author, and professor from Judique, Cape Breton Island, Nova Scotia.

== Music career ==
Graham has received music industry recognition. His second solo release, Step Outside, garnered nominations for "Male Artist of the Year" and "Roots/Traditional Solo Recording of the Year" at the 2002 East Coast Music Awards (EMCA). In 2006, he received his fifth nomination at the ECMAs for his recording Drive in the Roots/Traditional Solo Recording category. In 2006, he authored The Cape Breton Fiddle, published by the Cape Breton University Press. He and first cousin, the Honourable Rodney MacDonald (an educator and retired politician who served as the 26th Premier of Nova Scotia from 2006–09 and as MLA for the riding of Inverness in the Nova Scotia House of Assembly from 1999 to 2009), formed their own label, GlennRod Music Incorporated. Their 1997 album Traditionally Rockin' was nominated for two ECMAs. After MacDonald entered politics, Graham created and recorded on his own label, Bowbeat, but later returned to recording, performing, and marketing independently under his own name. He remains in demand for performances, both solo and as a duo act with MacDonald. Graham's sister, Amy, is also a Cape Breton musician and songwriter who has received radio airplay and music placements on TV shows.

== Family and other musical accomplishments ==
Graham's parents are the Gaelic singer Danny Graham and pianist Mary Beaton. He began performing in public at age seven, when he sang a Gaelic song with his father in a concert in Glendale, Nova Scotia. He began taking fiddle lessons at age ten from his maternal uncle, Kinnon Beaton, a renowned Cape Breton fiddler and prolific composer. Graham's grandfather, Donald Angus Beaton, was a legendary fiddler/composer, and his grandmother, Elizabeth Beaton, was a well-known pianist. Graham and musicians from his mother's side of the family, the Beatons, have been recorded by Smithsonian Folkways. He is also a grand-nephew of the late Alex Francis MacKay, a revered native Gaelic-speaking Cape Breton fiddler. Moreover, Graham is a song-writer and composer. He released a book containing some of his hundreds of fiddle tunes; other artists have recorded some of his compositions while popular TV series and independent films have also featured his music.

== Education and related accomplishments ==
Graham studied political science at St. Francis Xavier University in Antigonish (BA Honours), and obtained his first post-graduate degree (Master of Arts) in Atlantic Canada Studies at Saint Mary's University, Halifax, in 2004, with his thesis Cape Breton Fiddle Music: The Making and Maintenance of a Tradition. A revised and widely-cited book version was published in 2006 as The Cape Breton Fiddle: Making and Maintaining Tradition with CBU Press and is now with Nimbus Publishing. Graham also earned a PhD in political science at Dalhousie University, taught courses there, and taught as an assistant professor in political science at Saint Francis Xavier University. Graham currently works as an assistant professor at Cape Breton University. He has published articles in academic journals such as the Journal of Canadian Studies and the Canadian Political Science Review and was a member of Nova Scotia's 2018–19 Electoral Boundaries Commission.

== Discography ==
- Let 'Er Rip (1996)
- Traditionally Rockin' (1997) – with Rodney MacDonald
- Step Outside (2000)
- Cape Breton Fiddle and Piano Music (Smithsonian Folkways, 2004) – with the Beaton Family of Mabou, Nova Scotia
- Drive (2005)
- Decade: A Compilation (2007)
