= Do You Hear...Christmas =

Do You Hear…Christmas

Studio album by Heather, Cookie and Raylene Rankin
- Released: November 1997
- Genre: Country, folk
- Length: 52:59
- Label: EMI
- Producer: Heather Rankin; Cookie Rankin; Raylene Rankin; Jim Rondinelli

The Rankin Family chronology
Collection (1996)	Do You Hear…Christmas (1997)	Uprooted (1998)

Professional ratings
Review scores
Source	Rating
Allmusic	2/5 stars

Do You Hear…Christmas is a Christmas album by Heather, Cookie and Raylene Rankin of Canadian folk music group The Rankin Family. It was released by EMI in November 1997.

== Track listing ==
1. "Rockin' Around the Christmas Tree" (Johnny Marks) – 2:50
2. "The Christmas Star" (Heather Rankin) – 4:16
3. "I Wonder as I Wander" (Traditional) – 3:41
4. "Jesus Christ the Tree of Life" (Traditional) – 4:12
5. "Do You Hear What I Hear?" (Noël Regney, Gloria Shayne Baker) – 3:45
6. "Taladh Chriosda (The Christ-Child's Lullaby)" (Traditional) – 4:03
7. "A'challuinn (The New Year)" (Traditional) – 4:13
8. "Let It Snow! Let It Snow! Let It Snow!" (Sammy Cahn, Jule Styne) – 2:35
9. "Quelle Est Cette Odeur? (What Is This Scent So Pure and Lovely?)" (Traditional) – 4:10
10. "Ave Maria" (J.S. Bach, Charles Gounod) – 2:55
11. "Welcome Yule" (Traditional) – 3:19
12. "The Coventry Carol" (Traditional) – 2:43
13. "Children, Go Where I Send You" (Traditional) – 3:21
14. "Angels We Have Heard on High" (Traditional) – 4:01
15. "Oh Night of Joy and Gladness" (Traditional) – 2:55
