= Uprooted (The Rankin Family album) =

Studio album by The Rankins
- Released: April 28, 1998
- Genre: Country, folk
- Length: 57:24
- Label: EMI
- Producer: George Massenburg

The Rankins chronology
Do You Hear…Christmas (1997)	Uprooted (1998)	Souvenir: 1989—1998 (2003)

Professional ratings
Review scores
Source	Rating
Allmusic	3/5 stars

Uprooted is the fifth studio album by Canadian folk music group The Rankins. It was released by EMI on April 28, 1998. The album peaked at number 30 on the RPM Top Albums chart.

== Track listing ==
1. "Movin' On" (Jimmy Rankin) – 3:34
2. "Let It Go" (Jimmy Rankin) – 3:58
3. "Bells" (Jimmy Rankin) – 3:28
4. "Maybe You're Right" (Cookie Rankin, Gordie Sampson) – 4:13
5. "Long Way to Go" (Jimmy Rankin) – 3:28
6. "Cold Winds" (Heather Rankin) – 4:04
7. "Weddings, Wakes and Funerals" (Rod Campbell, Kevin MacMichael, Jimmy Rankin, Traditional) – 4:53
8. "One Day I Walk" (Bruce Cockburn) – 4:28
9. "Parlour Medley" (John Morris Rankin, Traditional) – 5:56
10. "O Tha Mo Dhuil Ruit (Oh How I Love Thee)" (Neil MacLeod, Traditional) – 2:59
11. "Tailor's Daughter" (Jimmy Rankin) – 5:07
12. "An Innis Àigh (The Happy Isle)" (Traditional) – 3:30
13. "Greenberg Medley" (David Greenberg, Dan Hugie McEachern, Traditional) – 4:11
14. "Farewell to Lochaber" (Traditional) – 3:35

== Chart performance ==
Chart (1998)	Peak position
Canadian RPM Top Albums	30
