= The Rankin Family (album) =

Studio album by The Rankin Family
- Released: 1989
- Genre: Country
- Label: Capitol
- Producer: Chad Irschick

The Rankin Family chronology
The Rankin Family (1989)	Fare Thee Well Love (1990)

The Rankin Family is the debut album by Canadian folk music group The Rankin Family. The album was originally self-released by the siblings in 1989. Featuring a mixture of Cape Breton fiddle tunes, Scottish Gaelic songs and English language songs, the album was re-issued by Capitol Records in 1992 and certified Platinum by the CRIA.

== Track listing ==
1. Mo Rùn Geal Dìleas (My Faithful Fair One)
2. Lonely Island
3. Loving Arms
4. Piano Medley: Memories of Bishop MacDonald/The Tweeddale Club/MacFarlane's Rant/Lively Steps
5. Mairi's Wedding (Michael Rankin's Reel)
6. Roving Gypsy Boy
7. Chì Mi na Mòrbheanna (Mist-Covered Mountains)
8. Fiddle Medley: The Warlock's/Bog an Lochain/Nine Pint Coggie/Mr. J. Forbes/Hull's
9. Lament of the Irish Immigrant
10. Jigging Medley: Whiskey in a Cup/King George/Old King's/The King's/Bodachan a'mhìrein
