= Reunion (The Rankin Family album) =

Studio album by The Rankin Family
- Released: January 16, 2007
- Genre: Country, folk
- Length: 46:27
- Label: Longview Music
- Producer: George Massenburg

The Rankin Family chronology
Souvenir: 1989—1998 (2003)	Reunion (2007)	These Are the Moments (2009)

Professional ratings
Review scores
Source	Rating
Allmusic	

Reunion is the sixth studio album by Canadian folk music group The Rankin Family. It was released by Longview Music on January 16, 2007.

== Track listing ==
1. "Departing Song" (Jimmy Rankin) – 3:32
2. "Nothing to Believe" (Heather Rankin) – 4:49
3. "Nothing Like an Ocean" (Jimmy Rankin, Gordie Sampson) – 3:28
4. "Sparrow" (Susan Crowe, Raylene Rankin) – 2:48
5. "Johnny Cope" (Traditional) – 4:07
6. "Sunday Morning" (David Francey) – 3:56
7. "The Way I Feel" (Gordon Lightfoot) – 4:02
8. "Our Time Is Tonight" (Jimmy Rankin) – 4:53
9. "Hush the Waves" (Traditional) – 2:08
10. "Hillsdale Medley" (John Morris Rankin) – 4:53
11. "Sunset" (Molly Rankin) – 4:37
12. "Gone" (John Hiatt) – 3:14
