= Leon Dubinsky =

Canadian actor, theatre director and composer (1941–2023)

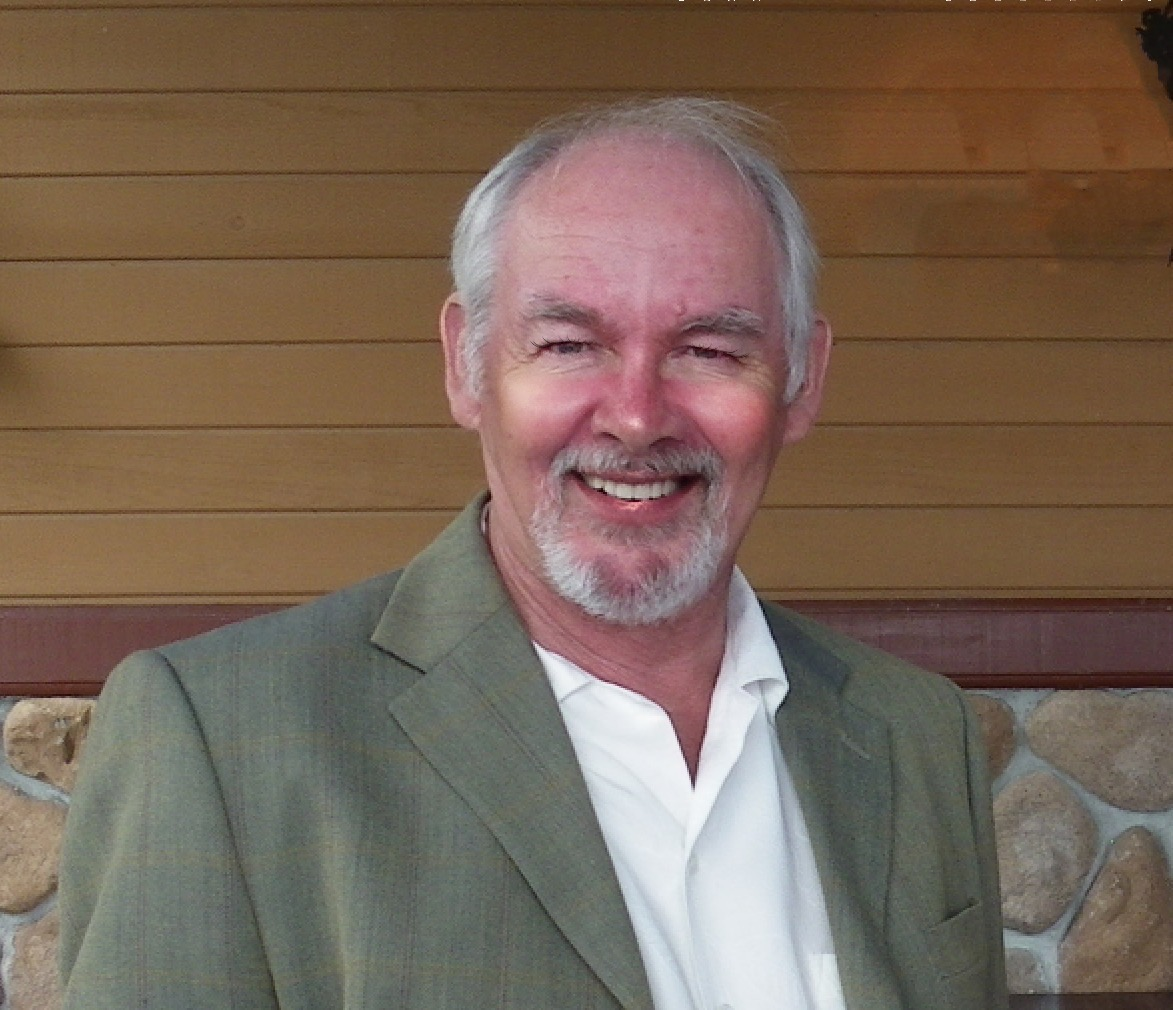
- Dubinsky in 2010
- Born: 5 July 1941; Sydney, Nova Scotia, Canada
- Died: 17 January 2023 (aged 81); Englishtown, Nova Scotia, Canada
- Occupations: Actor; theatre director; composer
- Years active: 1950s – 2023
- Known for: Buddy and the Boys; Cape Breton Revue; Rise and Follies
- Notable work: Rise Again

Leon Isaiah Dubinsky (5 July 1941 – 17 January 2023) was a Canadian actor, theatre director and composer from Sydney, Nova Scotia. His career was mostly spent in Atlantic Canada, with film, theatre and music projects generally produced on Cape Breton Island. His biggest musical hit was Rise Again. He was honoured with a lifetime achievement award by the East Coast Music Association. He died at home on 17 January 2023.

== Early life and death ==
Leon Issiah Dubinsky was born on 5 July 1941, in Sydney, Nova Scotia, to the Jewish merchant family of Newman and Esther (née Goldman) Dubinsky. They owned Sydney Ship Supply, a ship chandlery business in Sydney's Whitney Pier neighbourhood, that operated from the beginning of World War II until they sold it and retired. Dubinsky played guitar and piano into his teens and attended Sydney Academy where he composed the high school's theme "All Hail Sydney Academy." After years of health issues, Dubinsky died on 17 January 2023, at his family's farm in Englishtown, a village on Cape Breton Island's Cabot Trail.

== Musical career ==
Dubinsky first became prominent as a founding member of the Cape Breton band Buddy and the Boys in the 1970s and 1980s. He helped launch the annual musical stage revue The Rise and Follies of Cape Breton in the early 1980s. A song from that show, "Rise Again," became a Canadian pop music standard when the folk music group The Rankin Family recorded it for their 1993 album North Country. Their version was a cross-format hit, reaching the Top 20 on Canada's RPM pop and adult contemporary charts and the Top 40 on the magazine's country charts. The song was also later performed and recorded by Rita MacNeil and Anne Murray.

Another musical revue by Dubinsky, the Cape Breton Summertime Revue, toured even more extensively across Canada in the 1990s. In 2002, Dubinsky was the recipient of a lifetime achievement award, also known as the Stompin' Tom Connors Award, from the East Coast Music Awards for his contributions to Atlantic Canada's musical culture.

== Acting career ==
As an actor, Dubinsky is associated primarily with regional stage productions in the Maritime Provinces, including with The Mulgrave Road Co-op, Theatre Antigonish, Theatre PEI, and Factory Lab Theatre. He appeared in the 1987 film Life Classes, for which he garnered a Genie Award nomination for Best Supporting Actor at the 9th Genie Awards. He starred alongside Rick Mercer in the 1988 CBC Television teleplay My Brother Larry, and had a recurring role as Cap McKenzie in the 1990s television series Pit Pony.
