= Song Dog =

Studio album by Jimmy Rankin
- Released: August 14, 2001
- Genre: Country, folk
- Label: EMI

Jimmy Rankin chronology
Song Dog (2001)	Handmade (2003)

Song Dog is the first album by Jimmy Rankin, released on August 14, 2001.

== Track listing ==
1. "Followed Her Around" – 4:02
2. "Midnight Angel" – 3:59
3. "Drunk and Crucified" – 3:52
4. "Lighthouse Heart" – 4:10
5. "Wasted" – 4:21
6. "We'll Carry On" (Prelude) – 1:30
7. "This Is the Hour" – 4:11
8. "Tripper" – 4:51
9. "We'll Carry On" – 3:28
10. "You and Me" – 3:48
11. "Stoned Blue" – 4:30
12. "Captain Harmony" – 5:13
