= Forty Days and Nights =

Single by The Rankin Family

from the album Endless Seasons
- Released: 1996
- Genre: Country, folk
- Length: 4:57
- Label: EMI
- Songwriter: Jimmy Rankin
- Producers: John Jennings; The Rankin Family

The Rankin Family singles chronology
"The River" (1996)	"Forty Days and Nights" (1996)	"Roving Gypsy Boy" (1996)

"Forty Days and Nights" is a song recorded by Canadian music group The Rankin Family. It was released in 1996, as the third single from their fourth studio album, Endless Seasons. It peaked in the top 20 on the RPM Country Tracks chart.

== Chart performance ==
Chart (1996)	Peak position
Canada Country Singles (RPM)	18

=== Year-end charts ===
Chart (1996)	Position
Canada Country Tracks (RPM)	28
