= Fare Thee Well Love =

Studio album by The Rankin Family
- Released: November 7, 1990
- Genre: Country, folk
- Length: 36:03
- Label: Capitol
- Producer: Chad Irschick

The Rankin Family chronology
The Rankin Family (1989)	Fare Thee Well Love (1990)	North Country (1993)

Singles from Fare Thee Well Love
- 1. "Orangedale Whistle" Released: 1992; 2. "Fare Thee Well Love" Released: 1992; 3. "Gillis Mountain" Released: 1993

Professional ratings
Review scores
Source	Rating
Allmusic	4/5 stars

Fare Thee Well Love is the second studio album by Canadian folk music group The Rankin Family. The album was originally self-released by the siblings in 1990. It was re-issued by Capitol Records in 1992 and certified 5× Platinum by the CRIA.

== Track listing ==
1. "Orangedale Whistle" (Jimmy Rankin) – 3:29
2. "An T-Each Ruadh (The Red Horse)" (Traditional) – 2:12
3. "Fair and Tender Ladies" (Traditional) – 4:02
4. "Fiddle Medley" (Dan R. MacDonald, John Morris Rankin, Traditional) – 3:45
5. "Fisherman's Son" (Jimmy Rankin) – 3:34
6. "Tell My Ma" (Traditional) – 2:18
7. "You Left a Flower" (Jimmy Rankin) – 3:27
8. "Fare Thee Well Love" (Jimmy Rankin) – 4:33
9. "Gillis Mountain" (Raylene Rankin) – 3:07
10. "Gaelic Medley" (Traditional) – 4:09
11. "Tripper's Jig" (Traditional) – 1:27

== Chart performance ==
Chart (1992)	Peak position
Canadian RPM Country Albums	1
Canadian RPM Top Albums	5
