= Roving Gypsy Boy =

Single by The Rankin Family

from the album Collection
- Released: 1996
- Genre: Country, folk
- Length: 4:05
- Label: EMI
- Songwriter: Jimmy Rankin
- Producer: Chad Irschick

The Rankin Family singles chronology
"Forty Days and Nights" (1996)	"Roving Gypsy Boy" (1996)	"Movin' On" (1998)

"Roving Gypsy Boy" is a song recorded by Canadian music group The Rankin Family. It was released in 1996 as the first single from their greatest hits album, Collection. It peaked in the top 10 on the RPM Country Tracks chart. The track was first released on their self titled album in 1989

== Chart performance ==
Chart (1996)	Peak position
Canada Adult Contemporary (RPM)	23
Canada Country Singles (RPM)	9
