= Jubilee Auditorium =

Jubilee Auditorium is the name of:

- Northern Alberta Jubilee Auditorium in Edmonton
- Southern Alberta Jubilee Auditorium in Calgary
