= Endless Seasons =

Studio album by The Rankin Family
- Released: August 29, 1995
- Genre: Country, folk
- Length: 45:47
- Label: EMI
- Producer: John Jennings; The Rankin Family

The Rankin Family chronology
Grey Dusk of Eve (1995)	Endless Seasons (1995)	Collection (1996)

Professional ratings
Review scores
Source	Rating
Allmusic	4/5 stars

Endless Seasons is the fourth studio album by Canadian folk music group The Rankin Family. It was released by EMI on August 29, 1995. The album peaked at number 6 on the RPM Country Albums chart.

== Background ==
The Rankin Family recorded Endless Seasons in Nashville and Springfield, West Virginia, with producer and guitarist John Jennings.

== Track listing ==
1. "As I Roved Out" (Traditional) – 3:37
2. "The River" (Cookie Rankin) – 3:34
3. "Natives" (Paul Doran) – 4:01
4. "Òganaich an òr-Fhuilt Bhuidhe/Am Bràighe (Youth Whose Hair Is Golden)" (Malcolm Gillis, Traditional) – 3:31
5. "Forty Days and Nights" (Jimmy Rankin) – 4:57
6. "Eyes of Margaret" (John Morris Rankin) – 4:44
7. "You Feel the Same Way Too" (Jimmy Rankin) – 4:50
8. "Endless Seasons" (Jimmy Rankin) – 4:16
9. "Padstow" (Traditional) – 3:08
10. "Blue-Eyed Suzie" (John Morris Rankin) – 3:48
11. "Your Boat's Lost at Sea" (Jimmy Rankin) – 5:21

== Chart performance ==
Chart (1995)	Peak position
Canadian RPM Country Albums	6
Canadian RPM Top Albums	13
