= Canadian Radio Music Awards =

Annual awards by the Canadian Association of Broadcasters

The Canadian Radio Music Awards is an annual series of awards presented by the Canadian Association of Broadcasters that was part of Canadian Music Week. The award show began in 1998.

== 2016 ==
Complete list of 2016 Canadian Radio Music Awards winners

Best New Group or Solo Artist: CHR	Alessia Cara	Best New Group or Solo Artist: AC	Scott Helman
Best New Group or Solo Artist: Mainstream Rock	The Standstills	Best New Group or Solo Artist: Modern Rock	Coleman Hell
Best New Group or Solo Artist: Country	Cold Creek County	SOCAN Song Of The Year	Can't Feel My Face, By: The Weeknd
Chart Topper Award	Shawn Mendes	Fan Choice	The Weeknd
Heatseeker Award	The Strumbellas	FACTOR Breakthrough Artist Award	Leah Daniels

== 2017 ==
Complete list of 2017 Canadian Radio Music Awards winners

Best New Group or Solo Artist: CHR	Ruth B.	Best New Group or Solo Artist: Hot AC	Ruth B.
Best New Group or Solo Artist: Mainstream AC	Alessia Cara	Best New Group or Solo Artist: Modern Rock	The Strumbellas
Best New Group or Solo Artist: Mainstream Rock	The Strumbellas	SOCAN Song Of The Year	Love Yourself, By: Justin Bieber
Chart Topper Award	Justin Bieber	Fan Choice	Alessia Cara
Best New Group or Solo Artist: Dance/Urban/Rhythmic	Neon Dreams	FACTOR Breakthrough Artist Award	The Strumbellas
Best New Group or Solo Artist: Country	James Barker Band		

== 2018 ==
Complete list of 2018 Canadian Radio Music Awards winners

Best New Group or Solo Artist: CHR	Jessie Reyez	Best New Group or Solo Artist: AC	DVBBS
Best New Group or Solo Artist: Dance/Urban/Rhythmic	New City	Best New Group or Solo Artist: Rock	The Beaches
Best New Group or Solo Artist: Country	River Town Saints	FACTOR Breakthrough Artist Of The Year	Daniel Caesar
NIELSEN Cutting Edge Award	Indie 88	Fan Choice	Alessia Cara
NIELSEN Talent Development Story Of The Year	Daniel Caesar		
