= Back Road Paradise =

Studio album by Jimmy Rankin
- Released: April 1, 2014
- Genres: Folk, country
- Length: 40:41
- Label: Song Dog
- Producer: Bill Bell

Jimmy Rankin chronology
Tinsel Town (2012)	Back Road Paradise (2014)

Singles from Back Road Paradise
- 1. "Cool Car" Released: March 2014; 2. "Whiskey When the Sun Goes Down" Released: August 2014

Back Road Paradise is the sixth studio album by Canadian folk music artist Jimmy Rankin. It was released on April 1, 2014 on Rankin's own Song Dog label and distributed by Fontana North. The album is more country than Rankin's previous releases. It features collaborations with Alison Krauss and Jim Cuddy. The first single released from the album was "Cool Car".

== Critical reception ==
Doug Gallant of Ottawa at Home gave the album four stars out of five, writing that "Rankin's songwriting is so consistently strong throughout the record I would be hard pressed to point to anything on Back Road Paradise that I wouldn't put on a playlist." Doug Taylor of The Coast wrote that "the goal is to be on country radio all over, because with this album he deserves it." Ken Kelley of The Musicnerd Chronicles stated that "Rankin isn't as much about the bells and whistles and posturing as he is about delivering truly memorable songs, of which there are many."

== Track listing ==
No.	Title	Writer(s)	Length
1.	"Cool Car"	Jimmy Rankin, Patricia Conroy, Bob Moffatt, Clint Moffatt	3:03
2.	"Falling So Hard"	Rankin, Gordie Sampson, Jamie Robinson	3:39
3.	"Flames" (featuring Alison Krauss)	Rankin, Conroy, Steven MacDougall	3:29
4.	"I've Got a Feeling"	Rankin, Conroy, Jamie Warren	3:27
5.	"Back Road Paradise"	Rankin, Conroy, Dermot Grehan	3:20
6.	"Paris or Rome"	Rankin, Conroy, Danick Dupelle	3:26
7.	"Never Gonna Leave" (featuring Jim Cuddy)	Rankin, Conroy, B. Moffatt, C. Moffatt	2:54
8.	"Shades"	Rankin, Conroy	3:16
9.	"Blame It All on You"	Rankin, Sampson, MacDougall	3:26
10.	"Pull Out Your Picture"	Rankin, Conroy	3:09
11.	"Build This House"	Rankin, Conroy, B. Moffatt, C. Moffatt	3:35
12.	"Whiskey When the Sun Goes Down"	Rankin, MacDougall	2:38
13.	"Back Road Reprise"		1:19
Total length:			40:41

== Chart performance ==
=== Singles ===
Year	Single	Peak positions
Year	Single	CAN Country
2014	"Cool Car"	33
2014	"Whiskey When the Sun Goes Down"	—
"—" denotes releases that did not chart
