= Forget About the World (album) =

Studio album by Jimmy Rankin
- Released: April 12, 2011
- Genres: Folk, country
- Length: 44:55
- Label: Song Dog
- Producer: Bill Bell

Jimmy Rankin chronology
Edge of Day (2007)	Forget About the World (2011)	Tinsel Town (2012)

Singles from Forget About the World
- 1. "Here in My Heart" Released: March 7, 2011; 2. "I'm Just Saying" Released: July 18, 2011; 3. "The Hurtin' Part" Released: January 2, 2012

Forget About the World is the fourth studio album by Canadian folk music artist Jimmy Rankin. It was released on April 12, 2011 on Rankin's own Song Dog label and distributed by Fontana North. The album's first single, "Here in My Heart," was co-written with Patricia Conroy and features Keith Urban on guitar. Serena Ryder appears on "Walk That Way," Rankin's first duet since "Fare Thee Well Love."

Forget About the World was nominated for Country Album of the Year at the 2012 Juno Awards.

== Track listing ==
No.	Title	Writer(s)	Length
1.	"I'm Just Saying"	Jimmy Rankin, Steve MacDougall	3:47
2.	"Here in My Heart"	Rankin, Patricia Conroy	3:15
3.	"Perfect"	Rankin, JC Smith	3:15
4.	"Walk That Way" (duet with Serena Ryder)	Rankin, Christina Martin, Dwight D'eon	3:38
5.	"Maybe Nothing"	Rankin, MacDougall	3:14
6.	"Forget About the World"	Rankin, Tebey	4:13
7.	"Waiting on a Sign"	Rankin, Mladen Borosak, Rebecca Everett	2:51
8.	"The Hurtin' Part"	Rankin, Conroy	3:43
9.	"Lost"	Rankin, Thomas "Tawgs" Salter	3:33
10.	"What I Wouldn't Give"	Rankin, Conroy, Greg Becker	3:41
11.	"Louise"	Rankin	3:48
12.	"Colorado Dave"	Rankin	5:57
Total length:			44:55
