= Rise Again (The Rankin Family song) =

Single by The Rankin Family

from the album North Country
- Released: 1993
- Genre: Country, folk
- Length: 3:47
- Label: EMI
- Songwriter: Leon Dubinsky
- Producer: Chad Irschick

The Rankin Family singles chronology
| "Gillis Mountain" (1993) | "Rise Again" (1993) | "North Country" (1993) |

"Rise Again" is a song recorded by Canadian music group The Rankin Family. It was released in 1993 as the first single from their third studio album, North Country. It peaked in the top 10 on the RPM Adult Contemporary Tracks chart, and was a Top 20 hit on the magazine's pop chart and a Top 40 hit on its country chart. It received an East Coast Music Award nomination for best song in 1994.

== Background and writing ==
The song was written by Leon Dubinsky, a songwriter from Sydney, Nova Scotia, for a 1984 stage musical titled The Rise and Follies of Cape Breton, as an anthem of resilience and hope at a time when Cape Breton Island was going through an economic crisis. According to Dubinsky, the song is about "the cycles of immigration, the economic insecurity of living in Cape Breton, the power of the ocean, the meaning of children, and the strength of home given to us by our families, our friends and our music."

== Other versions ==
The Rankin Family's rendition, with its lead vocal performed by Raylene Rankin, popularized the song across Canada. As well as the Rankins, the song was also frequently performed in concert by Rita MacNeil, and recorded for her 2001 album Mining the Soul; it was also recorded by Anne Murray for her television special Anne Murray in Nova Scotia, with guest vocal appearances by MacNeil, the Rankins and The Men of the Deeps. The song has also been recorded and performed by Irish singing group, Celtic Thunder.

== In popular culture ==
Because of the song's uplifting spiritual themes, it has been frequently performed by church choirs in Canada. Because of Dubinsky's Jewish faith, it has also sometimes been performed by Jewish groups at commemorations of the Holocaust.

During the COVID-19 pandemic in Canada, the song was covered by Voices Rock Medicine, an ad hoc choir of women health care providers who recorded their parts virtually due to the social distancing restrictions on public gatherings. Their version was included in the television special Stronger Together, Tous Ensemble.

The song is considered an unofficial anthem of Cape Breton Island, and is the official school song of Cape Breton University.

== Chart performance ==
| Chart (1993) | Peak position |
|---|---|
| Canada Top Singles (RPM) | 12 |
| Canada Adult Contemporary (RPM) | 4 |
| Canada Country Singles (RPM) | 31 |

=== Year-end charts ===
| Chart (1993) | Position |
|---|---|
| Canada Adult Contemporary Tracks (RPM) | 37 |
