= North Country (song) =

Single by The Rankin Family

from the album North Country
- Released: 1993
- Genre: Country, folk
- Length: 3:36
- Label: EMI
- Songwriter: Jimmy Rankin
- Producer: Chad Irschick

The Rankin Family singles chronology
"Rise Again" (1993)	"North Country" (1993)	"Borders and Time" (1994)

"North Country" is a song recorded by Canadian music group The Rankin Family. It was released in 1993 as the second single from their third studio album, North Country. It peaked in the top 10 on the RPM Country Tracks and Adult Contemporary Tracks charts.

== Chart performance ==
Chart (1993–1994)	Peak position
Canada Top Singles (RPM)	30
Canada Adult Contemporary (RPM)	5
Canada Country Singles (RPM)	4

=== Year-end charts ===
Chart (1994)	Position
Canada Adult Contemporary Tracks (RPM)	38
Canada Country Tracks (RPM)	45
