= Orangedale Whistle =

Single by The Rankin Family

from the album Fare Thee Well Love
- Released: 1992
- Genre: Country, folk
- Length: 3:29
- Label: Capitol
- Songwriter: Jimmy Rankin
- Producer: Chad Irschick

The Rankin Family singles chronology
"Orangedale Whistle" (1992)	"Fare Thee Well Love" (1992)

"Orangedale Whistle" is a song recorded by Canadian music group The Rankin Family. It was released in 1992 as the first single from their second studio album, Fare Thee Well Love. It peaked in the top 10 on the RPM Country Tracks chart.

== Chart performance ==
Chart (1992)	Peak position
Canada Adult Contemporary (RPM)	25
Canada Country Singles (RPM)	7

=== Year-end charts ===
Chart (1992)	Position
Canada Country Tracks (RPM)	62
