= Gillis Mountain =

Single by The Rankin Family

from the album Fare Thee Well Love
- Released: 1993
- Genre: Country, folk
- Length: 3:07
- Label: Capitol
- Songwriter: Raylene Rankin
- Producer: Chad Irschick

The Rankin Family singles chronology
"Fare Thee Well Love" (1992)	"Gillis Mountain" (1993)	"Rise Again" (1993)

"Gillis Mountain" is a song recorded by Canadian music group The Rankin Family. It was released in 1993 as the third single from their second studio album, Fare Thee Well Love. It peaked in the top 10 on the RPM Country Tracks and Adult Contemporary Tracks charts. The song is a reference to Gillis Mountain, a 166-meter mountain in Cape Breton.

== Chart performance ==
Chart (1993)	Peak position
Canada Adult Contemporary (RPM)	6
Canada Country Singles (RPM)	4

=== Year-end charts ===
Chart (1993)	Position
Canada Adult Contemporary Tracks (RPM)	52
Canada Country Tracks (RPM)	16
