= Fare Thee Well Love (song) =

Single by The Rankin Family

from the album Fare Thee Well Love
- Released: 1992
- Genre: Country, folk
- Length: 4:33
- Label: Capitol
- Songwriter: Jimmy Rankin
- Producer: Chad Irschick

The Rankin Family singles chronology
"Orangedale Whistle" (1992)	"Fare Thee Well Love" (1992)	"Gillis Mountain" (1993)

"Fare Thee Well Love" is a song recorded by Canadian music group The Rankin Family. It was released in 1992 as the second single from their second studio album, Fare Thee Well Love. It peaked in the top 10 on the RPM Country Tracks and Adult Contemporary Tracks charts, and won the Juno Award for Single of the Year at the Juno Awards of 1994.

== Chart performance ==
Chart (1992–1993)	Peak position
Canada Top Singles (RPM)	14
Canada Adult Contemporary (RPM)	8
Canada Country Singles (RPM)	9

=== Year-end charts ===
Chart (1993)	Position
Canada Adult Contemporary Tracks (RPM)	54
Canada Country Tracks (RPM)	97
