= Mabou, Nova Scotia =

Community in Nova Scotia, Canada

Coordinates: 46°04′19″N 61°23′30″W

Mabou in Nova Scotia

Mabou (Scottish Gaelic: Màbu; An Drochaid; ) is an unincorporated community in the Municipality of the County of Inverness on the west coast of Cape Breton Island, Nova Scotia, Canada. The population in 2011 was 1,207 residents. It is the site of The Red Shoe pub, Beinn Mhàbu, the An Drochaid Museum, and Glenora Distillers.

== History ==
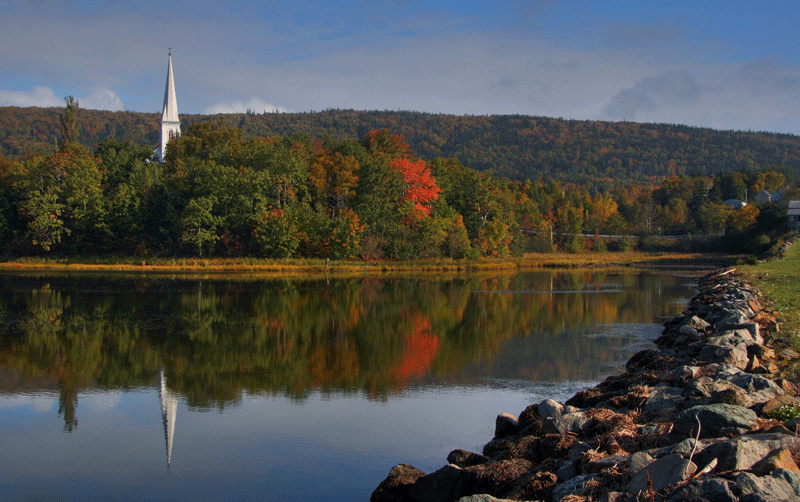
View of Mabou from the shore of the Mabou River

The name Mabou is thought to derive from Mi'kmaq name Malabo, shortened from Malabokek, meaning "place where two rivers meet" (the Mabou and Southwest Mabou rivers). It is also thought to mean "Shining Waters" or "Sparkling Waters". In Canadian Gaelic it is called An Drochaid, meaning "The Bridge".

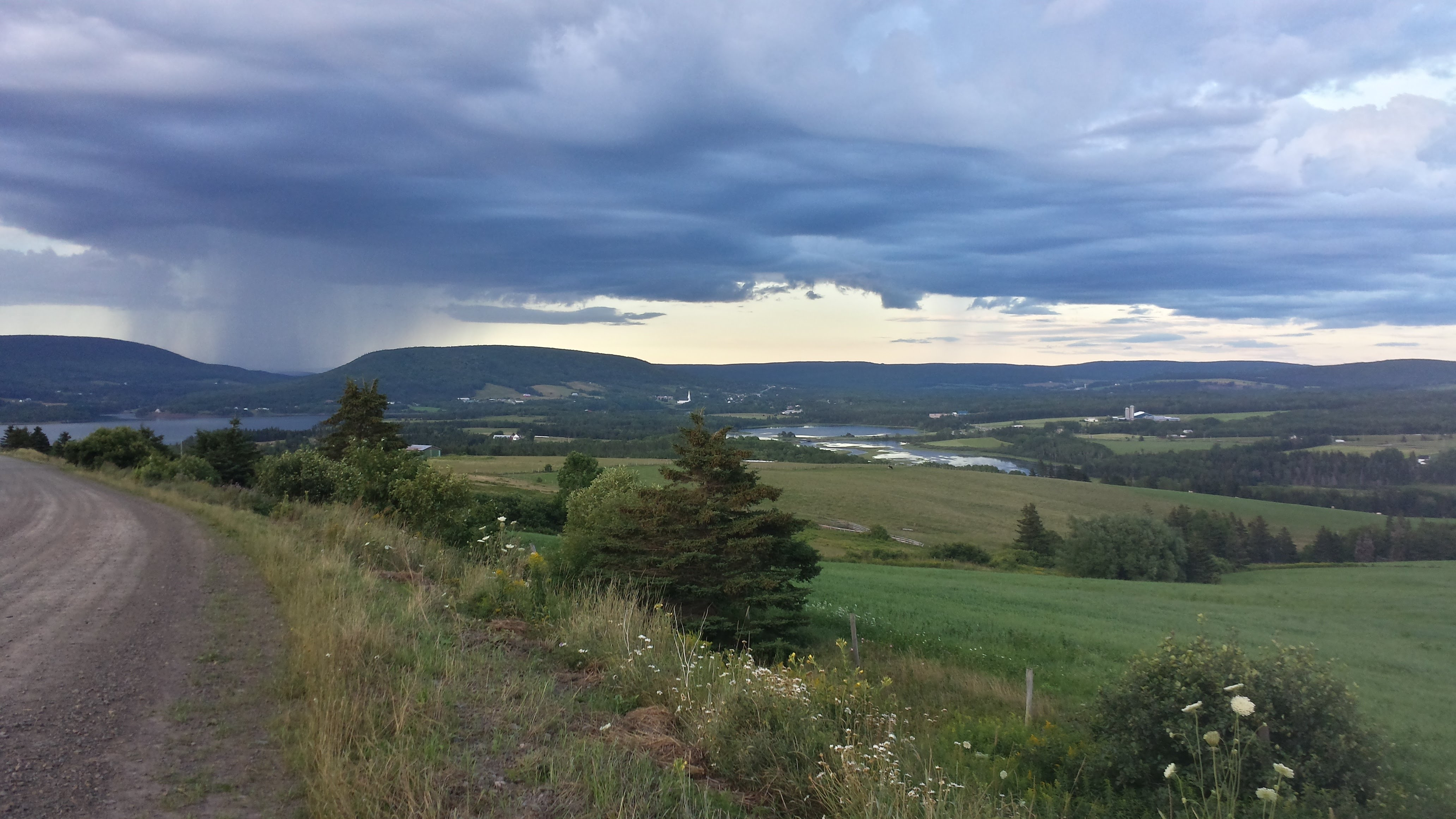
View of Mabou from Glengarry

French maps from the 1700s include names such as "Ance a la Peinture", "Harve a la Peinture", "Harve Pantur", and "Deguats de la peches des Basques". Variations of the Samuel Holland maps from 1767 have Hilsborough Inlet (by the French Paintures Harbour) and Hillsborough River. These names are denoted on what would be considered the Mabou inlet/harbour. Maps denote "Cap Mabou" separately from the inlet/harbour; however, the location varies with it being shown both to the south and the north. The Samuel Holland maps show it more definitively as what would be considered the Cape Mabou Highlands.

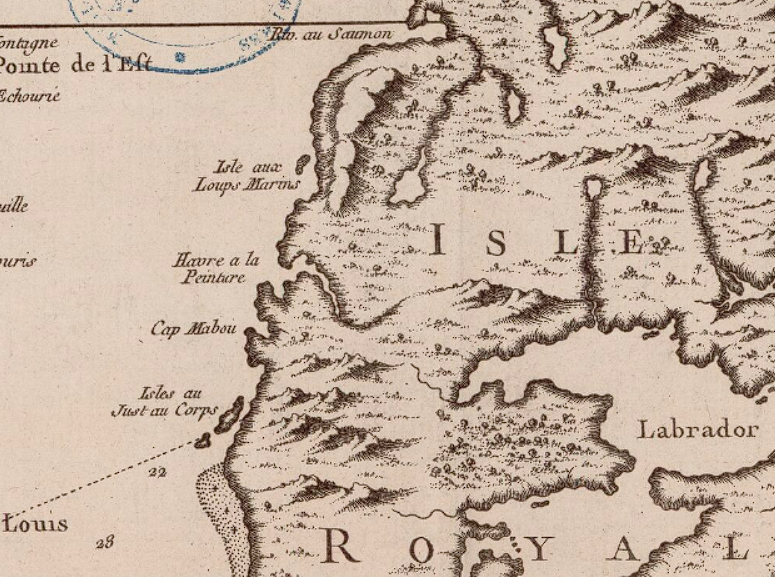
Historical map showing Harve a la Peinture and Cap Mabou

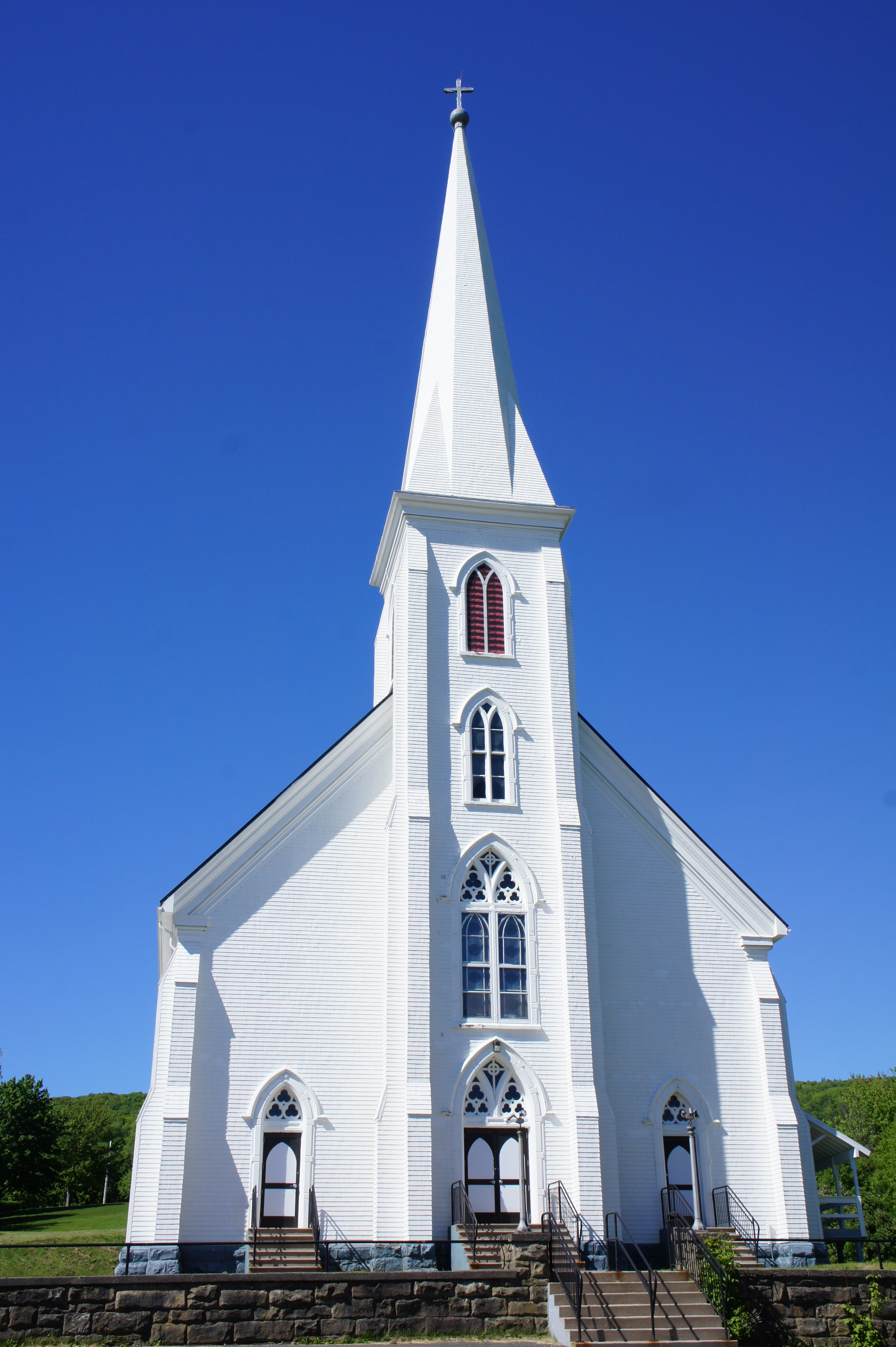
St. Mary's Roman Catholic Church, Mabou

In 1841, the first resident Roman Catholic priest, Maighstir Alasdair Mòr (Fr. Alexander MacDonald, 1801-1865) was assigned to Mabou, where he was seen as, "a veritable chieftain and patron of poets." Fr. MacDonald was also a very near kinsman to many local Gaelic-speaking pioneers, as he was 8th in descent from Iain Dubh MacDhòmhnaill, the 1st Tacksman of Bohuntine for Clan MacDonald of Keppoch.

In 1846, a series of bad harvests caused by the same blight as the Great Irish and Highland potato famines caused an exodus of Gaels from Mabou to Antigonish County (Scottish Gaelic: Siorramachd Antaiginis).

According to Marcus Tanner, "The Catholic clergy in rural west Cape Breton [also] included notorious enemies of the fiddle, such as Father Kenneth MacDonald, who conducted a local war with the music-makers in the 1860s and the 1870s. His campaign met with little success, however, and Cape Breton never saw the ceremonial burning of fiddles and bagpipes, as happened in Skye under the instigation of the famous blind catechist Donald Munro."

During the last quarter of the 19th century, according to historian Fr. Vincent Yzermans, the town of Holdingford, Minnesota was founded by Catholic Canadian Gaelic-speaking immigrants from Sight Point near Mabou. For this reason, Holdingford was originally called, "The Scotch Settlement", but now proudly describes itself as, "The Gateway to Lake Wobegon", after the fictional Central Minnesota town created by novelist and former radio host Garrison Keillor.

During the late 19th century and the first half of the 20th century Mabou's primary economic activity centered around gypsum and coal mines with several collieries located in the surrounding area. In 1865 plans were undertaken to modify the Mabou Inlet mouth. This entailed blocking of the existing channel and dredging a new and deeper channel on the north side of the inlet. This was to facilitate improved ship access to transport gypsum.

The Inverness and Richmond Railway opened in 1901 to connect the mines in Mabou and Inverness to wharves in Mabou and Port Hastings.

Mining activity ceased following World War II and the railway was abandoned during the late 1980s and is now a snowmobile and ATV trail.

Today Mabou is primarily a fishing port for a small fleet of lobster boats. It also hosts a high school serving central Inverness County.

In 2021, Mabou became important to the ongoing language revival efforts for Canadian Gaelic when (Scottish Gaelic: Taigh Sgoile na Drochaide) (lit. 'Bridge Schoolhouse') (fig. Mabou Schoolhouse) opened there as the first Gaelic-medium primary school in North America.

== Geography ==
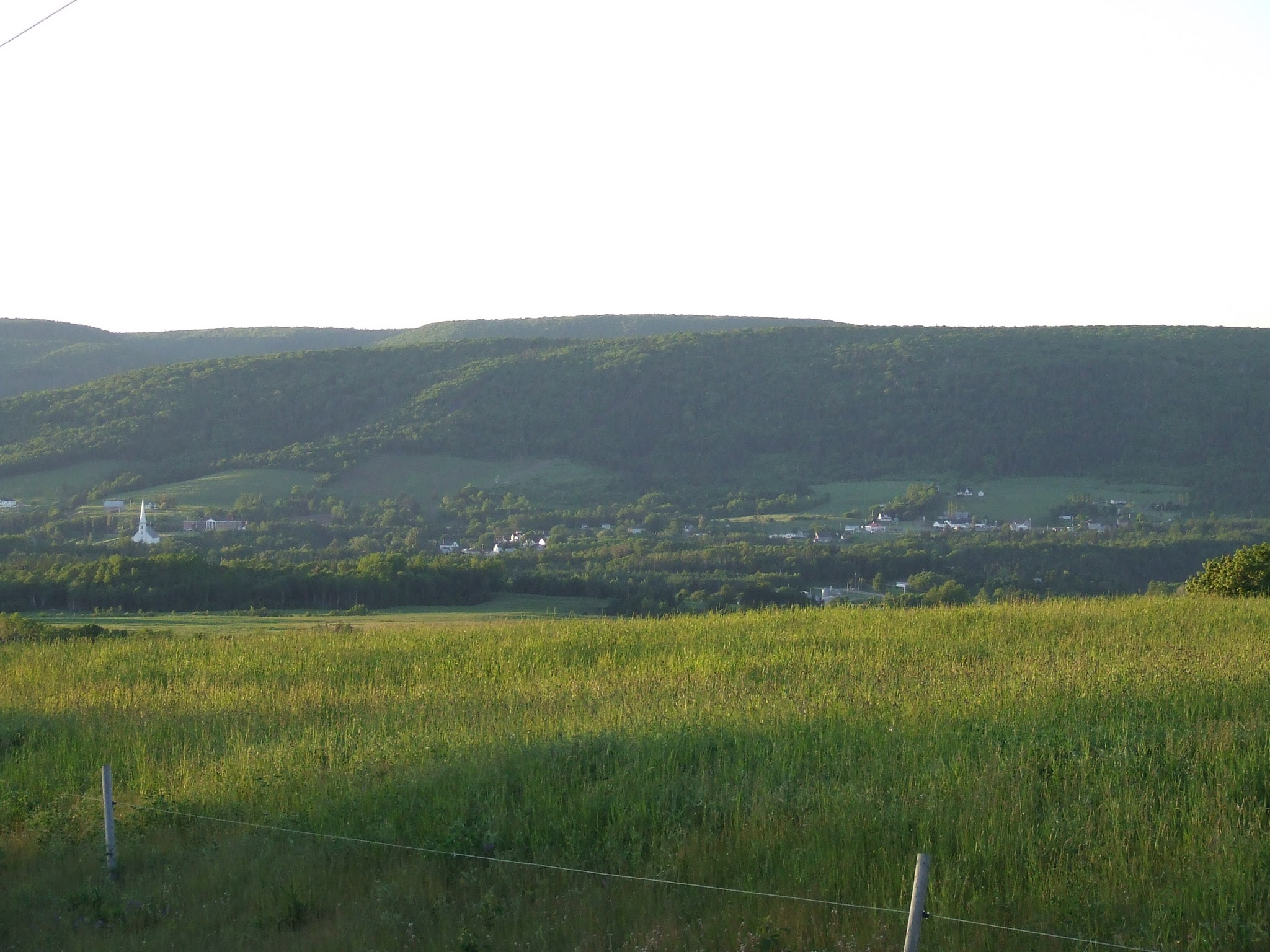
View of Mabou from Southwest Ridge

The community is located at the head of an inlet off the Gulf of St. Lawrence named "Mabou Harbour" and is surrounded by low mountains which are part of the Creignish Hills. The main community of Mabou is on the southern edge of the Cape Mabou Highlands and is at the confluence of the South West Mabou River and the Mull River.

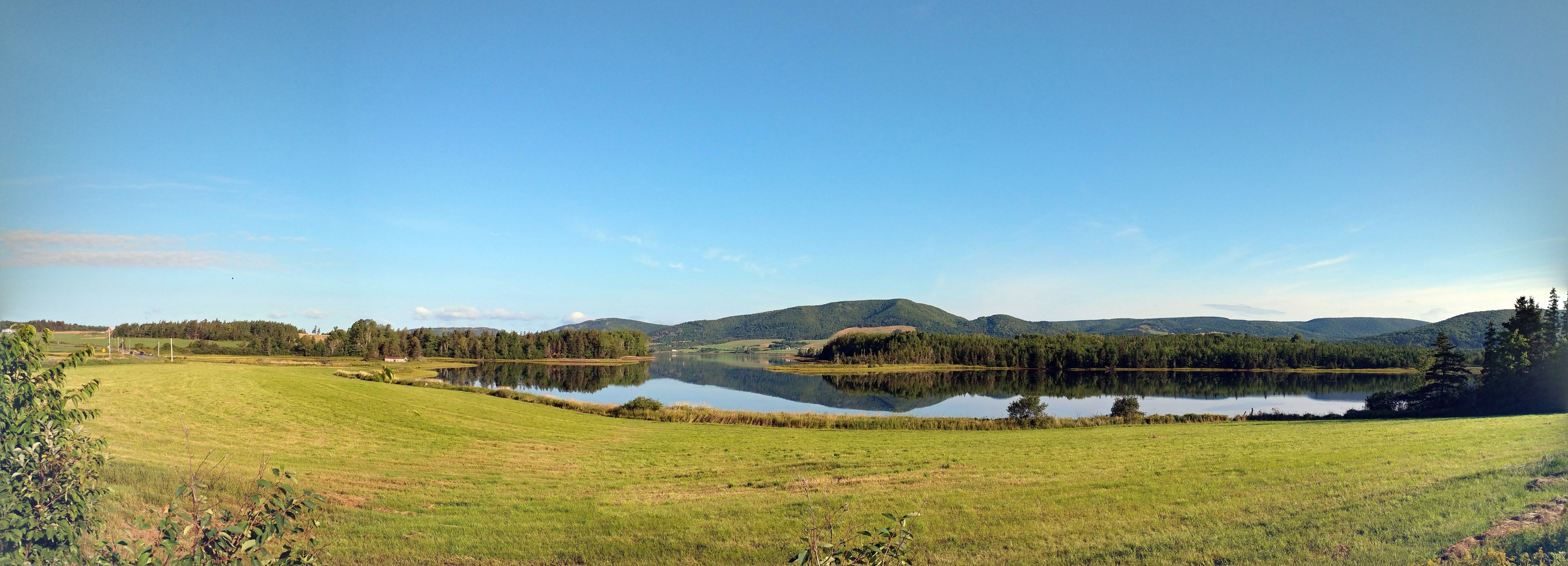
View of Cape Mabou Highlands

=== Climate ===
Climate data for Mabou (1981–2010)
Month	Jan	Feb	Mar	Apr	May	Jun	Jul	Aug	Sep	Oct	Nov	Dec	Year
Record high °C (°F)	16.5 (61.7)	15.0 (59.0)	18.0 (64.4)	23.0 (73.4)	31.5 (88.7)	33.0 (91.4)	33.5 (92.3)	35.5 (95.9)	29.0 (84.2)	24.5 (76.1)	19.5 (67.1)	16.5 (61.7)	35.5 (95.9)
Mean daily maximum °C (°F)	−1.5 (29.3)	−2.2 (28.0)	2.1 (35.8)	7.3 (45.1)	14.3 (57.7)	19.6 (67.3)	23.3 (73.9)	23.4 (74.1)	18.8 (65.8)	13.0 (55.4)	7.3 (45.1)	1.5 (34.7)	10.6 (51.1)
Daily mean °C (°F)	−5.6 (21.9)	−7 (19)	−2.3 (27.9)	3.1 (37.6)	8.8 (47.8)	13.9 (57.0)	18.0 (64.4)	18.1 (64.6)	14.1 (57.4)	9.0 (48.2)	4.1 (39.4)	−1.8 (28.8)	6.0 (42.8)
Mean daily minimum °C (°F)	−9.6 (14.7)	−11.6 (11.1)	−6.7 (19.9)	−1.2 (29.8)	3.3 (37.9)	8.1 (46.6)	12.6 (54.7)	12.9 (55.2)	9.3 (48.7)	5.0 (41.0)	0.8 (33.4)	−5.0 (23.0)	1.5 (34.7)
Record low °C (°F)	−25.5 (−13.9)	−34.5 (−30.1)	−26.0 (−14.8)	−13.0 (8.6)	−8.0 (17.6)	−2.5 (27.5)	1.5 (34.7)	1.0 (33.8)	−2.5 (27.5)	−6.0 (21.2)	−12.5 (9.5)	−24.0 (−11.2)	−34.5 (−30.1)
Average precipitation mm (inches)	82.7 (3.26)	82.1 (3.23)	77.0 (3.03)	82.0 (3.23)	77.0 (3.03)	81.9 (3.22)	85.9 (3.38)	90.7 (3.57)	124.3 (4.89)	136.1 (5.36)	137.2 (5.40)	115.2 (4.54)	1,171.9 (46.14)
Average rainfall mm (inches)	34.9 (1.37)	38.0 (1.50)	51.3 (2.02)	72.1 (2.84)	76.0 (2.99)	81.9 (3.22)	85.9 (3.38)	90.7 (3.57)	124.3 (4.89)	135.9 (5.35)	127.8 (5.03)	70.2 (2.76)	989.1 (38.94)
Average snowfall cm (inches)	47.9 (18.9)	44.1 (17.4)	25.7 (10.1)	9.9 (3.9)	1.0 (0.4)	0.0 (0.0)	0.0 (0.0)	0.0 (0.0)	0.0 (0.0)	0.1 (0.0)	9.3 (3.7)	45.0 (17.7)	182.9 (72.0)
Source: Environment Canada

== Famous residents ==
- The Rankin Family, professional performers of Cape Breton-style Scottish traditional music who have won numerous Canadian music awards (Junos, Canadian Country Music awards, ECMAs, SOCAN etc).
- John Allan Cameron, Canadian folk singer dubbed “The Godfather of Celtic Music”, Order of Canada Recipient, East Coast Music Awards Lifetime Achievement Award, Singalong Jubilee performer and host of 2 Canadian television programs, John Allan Cameron and The John Allan Cameron Show.
- Rodney MacDonald, 26th Premier of Nova Scotia and renowned Cape Breton fiddler, Current President of The Gaelic College and Beinn Mhàbu (campus of the Gaelic College)
- Samuel McKeen, In 1854 the Mabou-based Miller and inventor patented an early, highly practical version of the modern odometer to measure travel distances in horse-drawn carriages. https://www.thoughtco.com/history-of-odometers-4074178
- Allan The Ridge MacDonald (1794-1868) local pioneer, Seanchaidh, and poet. Highly important figure in both Scottish Gaelic literature and in that of Canadian Gaelic.
- Kate Beaton (born 1983), cartoonist and creator of the webcomic Hark! A Vagrant and the graphic novel Ducks: Two Years in the Oil Sands
- Robert Frank, world renowned filmmaker and street photographer.
- Molly Rankin, lead singer and lyricist of indie pop group Alvvays (and daughter of Rankin Family band member John Morris Rankin).
