= The Rankin Family =

Canadian music group

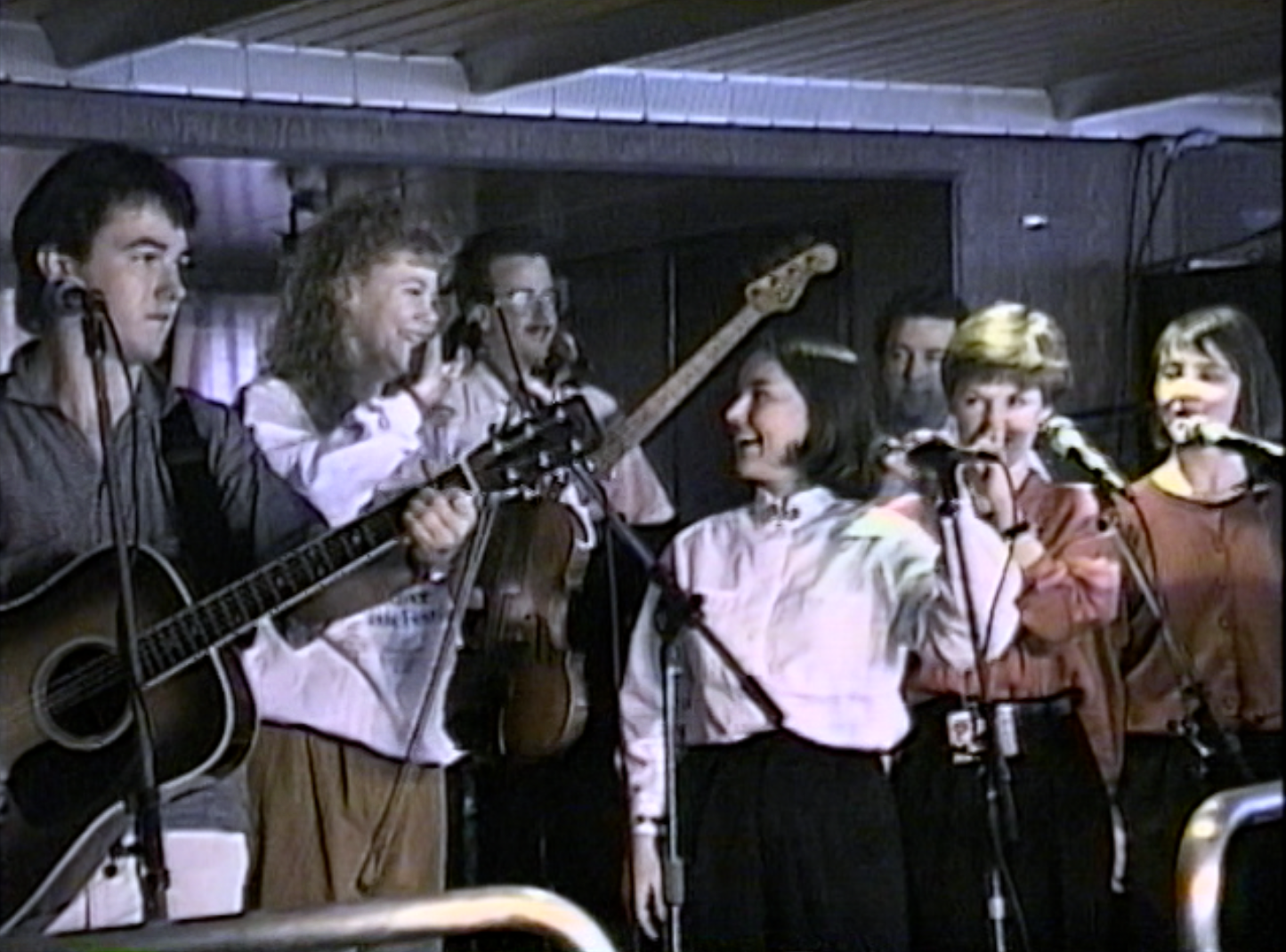
- The Rankin Family performing aboard the M/S Scotia Prince, April 18, 1990. From left to right: Jimmy Rankin, guest Natalie MacMaster, guest Bruce Phillips, Raylene Rankin, John Morris Rankin, Cookie Rankin, Heather Rankin.

Background information
- Also known as: The Rankins
- Origin: Mabou, Nova Scotia, Canada
- Genres: Celtic, country, folk
- Years active: 1989–present
- Labels: Capitol, EMI, Liberty, MapleMusic
- Members: Jimmy Rankin; Cookie Rankin; Heather Rankin
- Past members: Raylene Rankin (1960–2012); John Morris Rankin (1959-2000); David Rankin; Geraldine Rankin (1958–2007); Genevieve Rankin

The Rankin Family (also known as The Rankins) are a Canadian musical family group from Mabou, Nova Scotia. The group has won many Canadian music awards, including 15 East Coast Music Awards, six Juno Awards, four SOCAN Awards, three Canadian Country Music Awards and two Big Country Music Awards.

== Career ==
=== Background ===
The Rankins come from a family of 12 siblings, all of whom would entertain the neighbours musically every third weekend as part of a cèilidh. The first Rankin Family band formed in the 1970s when siblings Geraldine, Genevieve, David, John Morris, and Raylene Rankin began performing at local weddings and dances in Cape Breton. As the older siblings went away to college and university, the younger siblings Jimmy, Cookie and Heather took their places.

=== 1989–1999 ===
Jimmy, John Morris, Cookie, Raylene and Heather Rankin released their own independent cassettes, The Rankin Family (1989) and Fare Thee Well Love (1990), featuring original songs and a combination of traditional jigs, reels and Celtic folk songs. These independent recordings were distributed by the Canadian independent folk music distribution company 'Soundwright' until the band's major label breakthrough with EMI. Their television debut was on the CBC Television variety show On the Road Again in 1989. EMI's re-release of Fare Thee Well Love in 1992, went quadruple platinum, selling over 500,000 copies; the title track was a Top 40 single in Canada.

In 1998 The Rankins first worked with The Chieftains on their album, Fire in the Kitchen, performing the Celtic song, "An Innis Aigh" (The Happy Isle). That year the band released an album, Uprooted, which had a country music flavour.

On September 17, 1999, after recording the song "Jimmy Mo Mhile Stor" with The Chieftains for their album, Tears of Stone, the group issued a press release stating that they would no longer perform as a group in order to pursue independent interests and careers.

=== 2000–present ===
On January 16, 2000, John Morris Rankin was killed in a car accident in Cape Breton Island. His daughter Molly Rankin is now a musician, and is lead vocalist and rhythm guitarist for the indie pop band Alvvays.

In the spring of 2000 Heather Rankin joined Carly Simon on her New York City promotional tour for Simon's record The Bedroom Tapes, and appeared with Simon on the Rosie O'Donnell show.

Jimmy Rankin has continued to write songs and has released seven solo albums: Song Dog (2001), Handmade (2003), Edge of Day (2007), Forget About the World (2011), Back Road Paradise (2014), Moving East (2018), and Harvest Highway (2024). Raylene Rankin released the solo albums Lambs in Spring (2004) and all the diamonds (2011) and live in Nashville. Heather Rankin released the solo albums A Fine Line (2016) and Imagine (2017); the first album included a cover of the Tears for Fears hit “Everybody Wants To Rule The World” featuring Halifax rapper, Quake Matthews. When not performing on their own, the sisters run The Red Shoe pub in Mabou.

One of the founders of the group, Geraldine Coyne (Rankin), died January 10, 2007, the result of a brain aneurysm, at her home in Calgary. She had not performed with the group since prior to the first recordings' being released.

On January 16, 2007, the album Reunion was released, and in 2009 the Rankin Family released their seventh studio album, These Are the Moments.

On June 3, 2012, Raylene Rankin appeared on CBC Radio's The Sunday Edition where she spoke about her decade-long struggle with cancer. She died of metastatic breast cancer on September 30, 2012. After funeral services in St. Thomas Aquinas Church in Halifax and St. Mary's Church in Mabou, she was buried in St. Mary's cemetery.

In November 2026, Jimmy, Cookie and Heather Rankin announced the Together Again Tour, a 23-date cross-Canada tour beginning March 4, 2027, in Invermere, British Columbia, and ending April 3, 2027, in Sydney, Nova Scotia. As reported by Billboard Canada, it is the group's first tour together in nearly 15 years and marks the 20th anniversary of their 2007 reunion album and tour.

== Members ==
- Jimmy Rankin – vocals, guitar
- Cookie Rankin – vocals
- Heather Rankin – vocals

=== Former members ===
- Raylene Rankin (1960–2012) – vocals
- John Morris Rankin (1959–2000) – piano, fiddle
- David Rankin – vocals
- Geraldine Rankin (1958–2007) – vocals
- Genevieve Rankin – vocals

=== Band Members 1992 - 1999 ===
- Howie MacDonald - Fiddle, Keyboards
- John Chiasson - Bass, Bass Vocals
- Scott Ferguson - Drums
- Ray Montford - Guitar
- Gordie Sampson - Guitar
- Clarence Deveaux - Guitar

== Discography ==
Studio albums

- 1989: The Rankin Family
- 1990: Fare Thee Well Love
- 1993: North Country
- 1995: Endless Seasons
- 1998: Uprooted
- 2007: Reunion
- 2009: These Are the Moments

== Awards and nominations ==
Year	Association	Category	Result
1992	Juno Awards	Most Promising Group of the Year	Nominated
1992	Juno Awards	Country Group or Duo of the Year	Nominated
1992	Juno Awards	Best Roots & Traditional Album - Fare Thee Well Love	Nominated
1994	Juno Awards	Single of the Year - Fare Thee Well Love	Won
1994	Juno Awards	Group of the Year	Won
1994	Juno Awards	Country Group or Duo of the Year	Won
1994	Juno Awards	Canadian Entertainer of the Year	Won
1995	Juno Awards	Group of the Year	Nominated
1996	Juno Awards	Album of the Year - North Country	Nominated
1996	Juno Awards	Country Group or Duo of the Year	Nominated
1997	Juno Awards	Country Group or Duo of the Year	Won
1999	Juno Awards	Best Group	Nominated
2000	Juno Awards	Best Country Group or Duo	Won
2002	Juno Awards	Best Country Artist/Group - Jimmy Rankin (solo)	Nominated
2012	Juno Awards	Country Album of the Year - Forget About the World (Jimmy Rankin solo album)	Nominated
2013	Juno Awards	Adult Contemporary Album of the Year - All The Diamonds (Raylene Rankin solo album)	Nominated
