= Jimmy Rankin =

Canadian musician

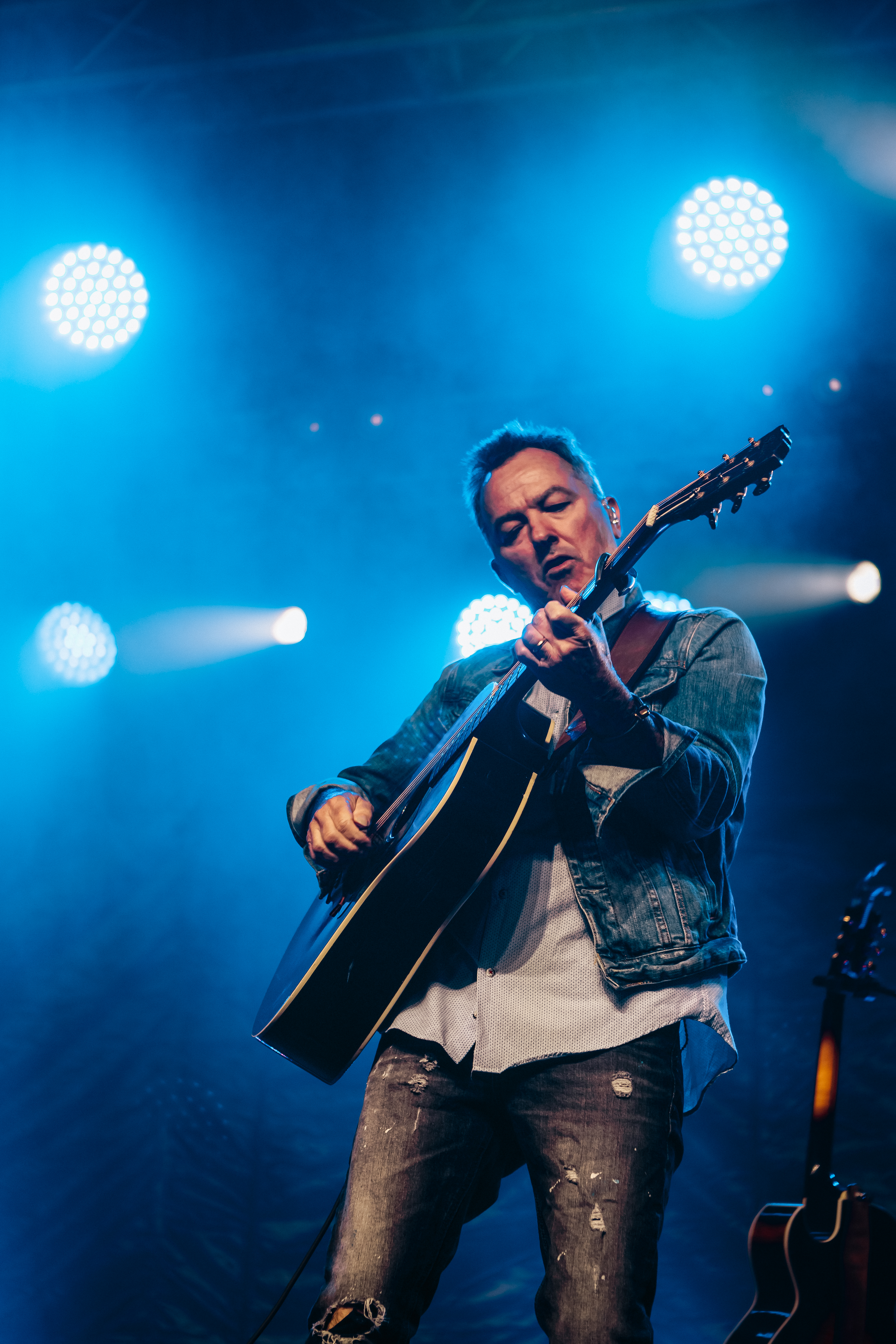
- Rankin in July 2021

Background information
- Born: James Kevin Rankin; May 28, 1964 (age 61)
- Origin: Mabou, Nova Scotia, Canada
- Genres: Country, folk
- Occupation: Singer-songwriter
- Instruments: Vocals, guitar
- Years active: 1989—present
- Labels: Song Dog Music
- Website: www.jimmyrankin.com

James Kevin Rankin (born May 28, 1964) is a Canadian country and folk artist. A member of The Rankin Family, Rankin has also released eight solo albums: Song Dog (2001), Handmade (2003), Edge of Day (2007), Forget About the World (2011), Tinsel Town (2012), Back Road Paradise (2014), Moving East (2018), and Harvest Highway (2023). Rankin's solo and Rankin Family awards include 5 Junos, 27 East Coast Music Awards, 9 SOCAN top radio play Awards, 7 Canadian Country Music Awards, 2 Music NS Awards, and 2 Canadian Radio Music Awards.

== Early years ==
Rankin was born in Mabou, Nova Scotia. He grew up as part of a musical family that would entertain the neighbors every third weekend as part of the local céilidh. This group became known as The Rankin Family and went on to achieve international success in the 1990s as they brought their well-loved mix of Cape Breton traditional music, roots and pop to the rest of the world.

== Musical career ==
=== 2001–2002: Song Dog ===
After embarking on a solo career, Rankin released his debut album, Song Dog in August 2001. Three singles were released from the album, "Followed Her Around", "Midnight Angel", and "Wasted". "Followed Her Around" was named the "Single of the Year" award at the SOCAN Awards in 2002. The song also was named "Single of the Year" and "Video of the Year" from the East Coast Music Association. Song Dog was named "Album of the Year" at the Canadian Country Music Awards and at the East Coast Music Awards. In 2003, "Midnight Angel" was named "Single of the Year" and Rankin was named SOCAN Songwriter of the Year at the East Coast Music Awards.

=== 2003–2004: Handmade ===
Handmade was released in September 2003 and produced three singles, "Morning Bound Train", "Butterfly", and "California Dreamer". It was named "Album of the Year" and "Roots/Traditional Solo Recording of the Year" at the East Coast Music Awards in 2003. "Morning Bound Train" was named "Single of the Year" and Rankin was named SOCAN Songwriter of the Year at the ECMA's. "Butterfly" was named "Single of the Year" and "Video of the Year" at the ECMA's in 2005. Rankin also received SOCAN Songwriter of the Year for the song.

=== 2006–2007: Edge of Day ===
After a brief hiatus, Edge of Day was released in May 2007 and produced three singles, "Slipping Away", "Got to Leave Louisiana", and "Still Lovers Now". In 2008, Rankin was named Songwriter of the Year at the Canadian Country Music Awards for the song, "First Time in a Long Time" with Deric Ruttan. At the East Coast Music Awards, Edge of Day was named Country Recording of the Year, FACTOR Recording of the Year and Konica Minolta Male Solo Recording of the Year. He was also awarded SOCAN Songwriter of the Year for the song, "Slipping Away".

=== 2011–2012: Forget About the World ===
Forget About the World was released in April 2011 and has released three singles, "Here in My Heart", "I'm Just Saying", and "The Hurtin' Part". Forget About the World was nominated fore Juno for Country Recording of the Year and a record breaking 8 ECMAs including: Recording of the Year, Entertainer of the Year, Song of the Year, Video of the Year, Country Album of the Year, Video of the Year and Songwriter of the Year. In September 2011, Rankin won a CCMA for "Roots Artist of the Year" and in November 2011 he won the Music Nova Scotia "SOCAN Songwriter of the Year" Award as well as a SOCAN top radio play award for his song "Up All Night". The accolades continued in December with Rankin's fans naming him one of CBC Radio's Top 50 Artists of 2011. Rankin's song "Here in My Heart" was named the number one Canadian Country song of 2011 by Top Country. Rankin won "Roots Artist of the Year" for the second year in a row in September 2012.

=== 2012–2013: Tinsel Town ===
The Christmas themed album Tinsel Town was released on November 6, 2012. Rankin embarked on Cross-Canada tours in support of the effort in November and December 2012 and 2013. The album, produced by Bill Bell (Jason Mraz, Tom Cochrane), contains four original songs: "Tinseltown", "December", "Boogie Woogie Christmas", and "Don't Wanna Say Goodbye to Christmas". The CD package has a unique feature that allows it to be sent in the mail as a Christmas card.

=== 2014–present: Back Road Paradise, Moving East and Harvest Highway ===
Rankin released his sixth full-length album, Back Road Paradise, produced by Bill Bell, on April 1, 2014. Back Road Paradise features 12 brand-new Rankin compositions, including lead-off single "Cool Car" and duets with Grammy winner and bluegrass icon Alison Krauss, as well as Blue Rodeo's Jim Cuddy. After living and working in Nashville for seven years, Rankin returned to his home province of Nova Scotia. His next album, Moving East, was produced by Joel Plaskett and was issued in September 2018. It was his first album for True North Records. Rankin followed up this release with the album Harvest Highway in 2023.

== Discography ==
=== Albums ===
Title	Details
Song Dog	Release date: August 14, 2001; Label: Song Dog Music/Fontana North
Handmade	Release date: September 2, 2003; Label: Song Dog Music/Fontana North
Edge of Day	Release date: May 8, 2007; Label: Song Dog Music/Fontana North
Forget About the World	Release date: April 12, 2011; Label: Song Dog Music/Fontana North
Tinsel Town	Release date: November 6, 2012; Label: Song Dog Music/Fontana North
Back Road Paradise	Release date: April 1, 2014; Label: Song Dog Music/Fontana North
Moving East	Release date: September 28, 2018; Label: True North
Harvest Highway	Release date: October 13, 2023; Label: True North

=== Singles ===
Year	Single	Peak positions	Album
Year	Single	CAN Country	Album
2001	"Followed Her Around"	*	Song Dog
2002	"Midnight Angel"	*	Song Dog
2002	"Wasted"	*	Song Dog
2003	"Morning Bound Train"	*	Handmade
2004	"Butterfly"	—	Handmade
2004	"California Dreamer"	—	Handmade
2006	"Slipping Away"	—	Edge of Day
2007	"Got to Leave Louisiana"	20	Edge of Day
2007	"Still Lovers Now"	—	Edge of Day
2011	"Here in My Heart"	14	Forget About the World
2011	"I'm Just Saying"	31	Forget About the World
2012	"The Hurtin' Part"	49	Forget About the World
2012	"Tinseltown"	—	Tinsel Town
2014	"Cool Car"	33	Back Road Paradise
2014	"Whiskey When the Sun Goes Down"	—	Back Road Paradise
"—" denotes releases that did not chart "*" denotes releases where no chart existed

=== Other charted songs ===
Year	Single	Peak positions	Album
Year	Single	CAN AC	Album
2014	"Boogie Woogie Christmas"	44	Tinsel Town

=== Music videos ===
Year	Video	Director
2001	"Followed Her Around"	George Dougherty
2002	"Midnight Angel"	David Hyde
2003	"Morning Bound Train"	
2004	"Butterfly"	Margaret Malandruccolo
2004	"California Dreamer"	Margaret Malandruccolo
2007	"Slipping Away"	David Hogan
2011	"Here in My Heart"	Jeth Weinrich
2011	"I'm Just Saying"	Jeth Weinrich
2012	"The Hurtin' Part"	Margaret Malandruccolo
2014	"Cool Car"	Margaret Malandruccolo
2014	"Whiskey When the Sun Goes Down"	Stephano Barberis
2018	"Been Away"	

== Awards and nominations ==
Year	Association	Category	Result
2002	Canadian Radio Music Awards	Best New Solo Artist (Adult Contemporary)	Won
2002	Canadian Radio Music Awards	Best New Solo Artist (Country)	Won
2002	Canadian Country Music Awards	Album of the Year – Song Dog	Nominated
2002	Canadian Country Music Awards	Roots Artist/Group of the Year	Won
2002	East Coast Music Awards	Album of the Year – Song Dog	Won
2002	East Coast Music Awards	Country Artist/Group of the Year	Won
2002	East Coast Music Awards	Male Artist of the Year	Won
2002	East Coast Music Awards	Single of the Year – "Followed Her Around"	Won
2002	East Coast Music Awards	SOCAN Songwriter of the Year – "Followed Her Around" (with Gordie Sampson)	Won
2002	East Coast Music Awards	Video of the Year – "Followed Her Around	Won
2002	Juno Awards of 2002	Best Country Artist/Group	Nominated
2002	Nova Scotia Music Awards	Music Industry Artist of the Year	Won
2002	Nova Scotia Music Awards	Songwriter of the Year	Won
2002	SOCAN Awards	Single of the Year – "Followed Her Around"	Won
2003	Canadian Country Music Awards	Roots Artist/Group of the Year	Nominated
2003	East Coast Music Awards	Single of the Year – "Midnight Angel"	Won
2003	East Coast Music Awards	SOCAN Songwriter of the Year – "Midnight Angel"	Won
2004	Canadian Country Music Awards	Roots Artist/Group of the Year	Nominated
2004	East Coast Music Awards	Album of the Year – Handmade	Won
2004	East Coast Music Awards	Entertainer of the Year	Won
2004	East Coast Music Awards	Male Artist of the Year	Won
2004	East Coast Music Awards	Roots/Traditional Solo Recording of the Year – Handmade	Won
2004	East Coast Music Awards	Single of the Year – "Morning Bound Train"	Won
2004	East Coast Music Awards	SOCAN Songwriter of the Year – "Morning Bound Train"	Won
2005	East Coast Music Awards	Entertainer of the Year	Won
2005	East Coast Music Awards	Single of the Year – "Butterfly"	Won
2005	East Coast Music Awards	SOCAN Songwriter of the Year – "Butterfly"	Won
2005	East Coast Music Awards	Video of the Year – "Butterfly"	Won
2007	Canadian Country Music Awards	Roots Artist/Group of the Year	Nominated
2008	Canadian Country Music Awards	Songwriter of the Year – "First Time in a Long Time" (with Deric Ruttan)	Nominated
2008	East Coast Music Awards	Country Recording of the Year – Edge of Day	Won
2008	East Coast Music Awards	FACTOR Recording of the Year – Edge of Day	Won
2008	East Coast Music Awards	Konica Minolta Male Solo Recording of the Year – Edge of Day	Won
2008	East Coast Music Awards	SOCAN Songwriter of the Year – "Slipping Away"	Won
2011	Canadian Country Music Awards	Roots Artist/Group of the Year	Won
2011	Nova Scotia Music Awards	SOCAN Songwriter of the Year – "Here in My Heart"	Won
2012	Juno Awards of 2012	Country Album of the Year – Forget About the World	Nominated
2012	East Coast Music Awards	Fan's Choice Video of the Year	Won
2012	Canadian Country Music Awards	Roots Artist/Group of the Year	Won
2014	Canadian Country Music Awards	Roots Artist/Group of the Year	Nominated
