= List of swing musicians =

This is a list of swing and Western swing musicians.

== Swing ==
- Andy Kirk (1898-1992)
- Anita O'Day (1919–2006)
- Art Tatum (1909–1956)
- Artie Shaw (1910–2004)
- Ben Webster (1909–1973)
- Benny Carter (1907–2003)
- Benny Goodman (1909–1986)
- Bill Doggett (1916–1996)
- Billie Holiday (1915–1959)
- Buck Clayton (1911–1991)
- Buddy Rich (1917–1987)
- Bunny Berigan (1908–1942)
- Cab Calloway (1907–1994)
- Charlie Barnet (1913–1991)
- Charlie Christian (1918–1942)
- Chick Webb (1905–1939)
- Chu Berry (1908–1941)
- Cliff Townshend (1917–1986)
- Coleman Hawkins (1904–1969)
- Count Basie (1904–1984)
- Cozy Cole (1909–1981)
- Craig Ball (1909–1960)
- Doc Severinsen (1927–)
- Don Byas (1912–1972)
- Don Redman (1900–1964)
- Django Reinhardt (1910–1953)
- Duke Ellington (1899–1974)
- Earl Hines (1903–1983)
- Ella Fitzgerald (1917–1996)
- Fats Waller (1904–1943)
- Fletcher Henderson (1897–1952)
- Frank Sinatra (1915–1998)
- Freddie Green (1911–1987)
- Gene Krupa (1909–1973)
- George Duvivier (1920–1985)
- George Paxton
- Glenn Miller (1904–1944)
- Hank Jones (1918–2010)
- Harry James (1916–1983)
- Illinois Jacquet (1922–2004)
- Ilse Huizinga (1966–)
- J.C. Heard (1911–1985)
- Jack Teagarden (1905–1964)
- Jean Goldkette (1893–1962)
- Jimmy Dorsey (1904–1957)
- Jimmy Rushing (1902–1972)
- Jo Jones (1911–1985)
- Johnny Hodges (1906–1970)
- Lester Young (1909–1959)
- Lil Hardin Armstrong (1898-1971)
- Lionel Hampton (1908–2002)
- Louie Bellson (1924–2009)
- Louis Armstrong (1901–1971)
- Midge Williams (1915–1952)
- Milt Hinton (1910–2000)
- Nat King Cole (1919–1965)
- Roy Eldridge (1911–1989)
- Sammy Kaye (1910–1987)
- Slim Gaillard (1916–1991)
- Sonny Greer (1895–1982)
- Stéphane Grappelli (1908–1997)
- Sun Ra (1934–1993)
- Sweets Edison (1915–1999)
- Ted Heath (1902–1969)
- Teddy Wilson (1912–1986)
- The Squadronaires (1939–)
- Tommy Dorsey (1905–1956)
- Woody Herman (1913–1987)

== Western swing ==
- Adolph Hofner (1932–1993)
- Bob Wills & His Texas Playboys (1905–1975)
- Cecil Brower (1914–1965)
- Chet Atkins (1942–1996)
- Chubby Wise (1915–1996)
- Cliff Bruner (1915–2000)
- George Strait (1952–)
- Hank Penny (1918–1992)
- Hank Thompson, (1946–2007)
- Johnny Gimble (1938–2015)
- Johnnie Lee Wills (1912–1984)
- Leon McAuliffe (1917–1988)
- Light Crust Doughboys (1931–)
- Mart Kenney (1910–2006)
- Milton Brown (1903–1936)
- Moon Mullican (1909–1967)
- Pee Wee King (1914–2000)
- Sheb Wooley (1945–1999)
- Spade Cooley (1910–1969)
- Tex Williams (1917–1985)
- Tommy Allsup (1931–2017)
- Tommy Duncan (1911–1967)

== Swing revival groups (post-1960) ==
- Asleep at the Wheel (1970–)
- Beantown Swing Orchestra (2006-)
- Big Sandy & His Fly-Rite Boys (1990–)
- Big Bad Voodoo Daddy (1989–)
- Clint Black (1983–)
- Buster Poindexter (1987–)
- Commander Cody and His Lost Planet Airmen (1967–1976)
- Ray Gelato (1982–)
- Dan Hicks (1965–2016)
- The Dusty Chaps (1969–1980s)
- Hot Club of Cowtown (1997–)
- Lyle Lovett (1980–)
- Michael Bublé (1975–)
- The Quebe Sisters Band (2000–)
- Riders in the Sky (1977–)
- Shoot Low Sheriff (2008–)
