= Western swing fiddle =

Music genre

Western swing originated in the 1920s and 1930s; small towns in the US Southwest. Although sometimes subject to the term "Texas swing" it is widely associated with Tulsa, others contend that "Western Swing music finds deep roots in the dust bowl of Oklahoma", and its influences include jazz from the major urban centers of the United States. Its stylistic origins lie in Old Time, Western, blues, folk, swing, Dixieland and jazz. Writing in Rolling Stone, Dan Hicks described it as Texas-bred music grafted to jazz, or as "white country blues with a syncopated beat.".

Bob Wills is considered by many music authorities one of the fathers of Western swing along with his old Fort Worth friend, Milton Brown. Nevertheless, it is Wills who is called the King of Western Swing. A key factor in its development was the competition that the radio and recordings brought to compete with the more insular and time honored traditions of old time fiddle music. "Hep cat" and sometime Roy Rogers stand-in Spade Cooley used the title of "King of Western Swing" as per a 1945 Warner Brothers film.

== Distinctives of the style ==
One of the characteristics of the genre is that fiddle is the lead instrument, unlike other genres such as Cajun in which the lead instrument varies in different eras. A major characteristic of the style is syncopation and rhythmic drive – it is dance music. It was typically played in bars and in big city Western hotel buildings with large ballrooms; alcohol was served and fights were not unknown. The musicians had to keep the music going until they had fulfilled their contract and could get paid. Twin fiddles and even triple fiddle was another distinctive of Western Swing fiddle.

== Repertoire ==
Many old time fiddle tunes were adapted to Western swing. "Faded Love" is a Western swing song written by Bob Wills, his father John Wills, and his brother, Billy Jack Wills. The melody came from an old fiddle tune Bob learned from his father, John Wills.

San Antonio Rose written by Wills, was his biggest hit, taking him "from hamburgers to steaks!". It sold over a million copies.

== Notable Western Swing fiddlers (partial list) ==
Bus Boyk

Cecil Brower

Cliff Bruner

Johnny Gimble

Billy Hughes (musician)

Merl Lindsay

Rose Maddox

Billy Jack Saucier

Dave Stogner

Bob Wills

Johnnie Lee Wills

Joe Holley

Louis Tierney

Cliff Bruner

== Crossover and influence ==
Westerns swing is influential on country music as demonstrated by, for instance, collaboration of Willie Nelson with Asleep at the Wheel on Austin City Limits in 2009.

== Bibliography ==
- Boyd, Jean Ann. Jazz of the Southwest: An Oral History of Western Swing. Austin: University of Texas Press, 1998. ISBN 978-0-292-70859-4
- Boyd, Jean A. "Western Swing: Working-Class Southwestern Jazz of the 1930s and 1940s". Perspectives on American Music, 1900-1950 (ch. 7, pp. 193–214), edited by Michael Saffle. Routledge, 2000. ISBN 978-0-8153-2145-3
