= Craig Ball =

Craig Ball may refer to:

- Craig Ball (musician), American swing clarinet player
- Craig Ball (forensic analyst), American computer forensic analyst and former trial lawyer
- Craig Ball (actor) from Home and Away
