= Pat O'Daniel and His Hillbilly Boys =

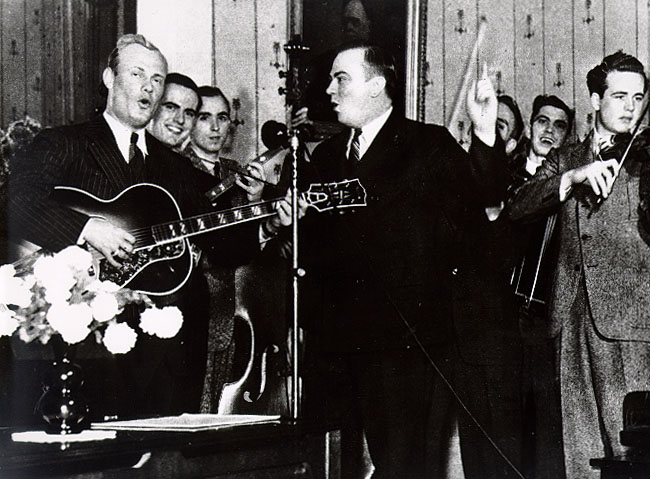
- "Please Pass the Biscuits, Pappy!”
- Genre: Monaural Sound
- Running time: 15 Minutes
- Country of origin: USA
- Language: English,
- Home station: WBAP
- Starring: Pat O'Daniel, "Pappy" O'Daniel, the Hillbilly Boys
- Created by: W. Lee "Pappy" O'Daniel
- Original release: ca 1935 – ca 1939
- Sponsored by: W. Lee O'Daniel Flour Co, of Fort Worth, Texas; Hillbilly Flour
- Podcast: M3u at Archive.org

Pat O'Daniel and his Hillbilly Boys was a Texan Western swing band with its own radio program during the mid-1930s. Pat O'Daniel, the son of "Pappy" O'Daniel, was the band's leader. The Hillbilly Boys, associated with Pappy O'Daniel's flour company which produced Hillbilly Flour, helped catapult Pappy O'Daniel to the governorship of Texas (although this is often credited to Pappy O'Daniel's earlier band, the Light Crust Doughboys).

== Background ==
After leaving the Burrus Mill Flour Company in 1935, Pappy O'Daniel created the W. Lee O'Daniel Flour Co., with its Hillbilly Flour brand. In conjunction with his new company, O'Daniel also formed a new band, called the Hillbilly Boys, and installed his son Pat as its band leader. Other members included his other son Mike, Leon Huff, Leon McAuliffe, and at various times, Kermit "The Love Bird" Whalin, Jim Boyd, Wallace Griffin, Curley Perrin, Bundy Bratcher and Kitty "Texas Rose" Williamson. To keep his singers' individual fame from eclipsing the band's as a whole (as had happened with Bob Wills), Pappy O'Daniel decided to give band members nicknames (Pat was called Patty-boy, Mike was called Mickey Wickey, and Caroll Hubbard was Little Caesar the Fiddle Teaser). Pappy continued his past success at linking music with advertising. This included marketing ideas like including pictures of his band members on sacks of flour, which moms could sew into dolls for their children.

The band's theme song, an adaptation of "I Like Mountain Music", a popular fiddle song, included the line "Pass the biscuits, Pappy!" which gave the elder O'Daniel his nickname. He announced his Texas gubernatorial campaign in 1938 on the radio during the Hillbilly Boys' radio show and make "Pass the biscuits, Pappy!" his campaign slogan. As he had done earlier with the Doughboys, O'Daniel fitted out a bus with placards advertising Hillbilly Flour and took his band on the road, but this time to mount a political campaign. O'Daniel, his son Pat and the other Hillbilly Boys drove more than 20,000 miles in their bus promoting O'Daniel's political ambitions and his flour. By most accounts, the band drew rapt crowds in even the smallest town. When the tour bus hit Houston, it drew an estimated 26,000 people, the largest crowd ever for a political rally in Texas at that time.

=== Radio show ===
The Hillbilly Boys had a 15-minute daily radio show, which was immensely popular in Great Depression-era Texas. It featured Western swing music and preaching by Pappy O'Daniel. The show extolled the values of Hillbilly brand flour, the Ten Commandments and the Bible. O'Daniel's biographer credited the Hillbilly Boys (and the Doughboys)' radio shows with O'Daniel's gubernatorial win. The counties where O'Daniel won a plurality of votes were the ones that received the Doughboys' and Hillbilly Boys' broadcasts. O'Daniel would record individual shows for each radio station on Presto 16" acetates and then ship them to the individual stations. The largest pluralities were recorded around Fort Worth, Texas, where the radio stations that broadcast their shows (KTRH-Houston, KTSA-San Antonio, KRLD-Dallas and WBAP) were headquartered.

There is little documentation on the show in major radio directories. It is however, covered extensively within Texas.

== See also ==
- O Brother, Where Art Thou?
- W. Lee O'Daniel
- Light Crust Doughboys
