= KTAT =

- Frederick, Oklahoma; United States
- Frequency: 1570 kHz

Programming
- Format: Adult standards

Ownership
- Owner: High Plains Radio Network, LLC
- Sister stations: KEYB; KYBE; KJOK

History
- First air date: 1948
- Last air date: 2024

Technical information
- Licensing authority: FCC
- Facility ID: 67312
- Class: D
- Power: 250 watts day; 6 watts night
- Transmitter coordinates: 34°23′30.3″N 99°1′52.3″W

Links
- Public license information: Public file; LMS

KTAT (1570 AM) was a radio station licensed to Frederick, Oklahoma, United States. The format was adult standards. The station was last owned by High Plains Radio Network, LLC.

== History ==
On January 25, 2006, the station was sold to Morey Broadcasting.

The KTAT license was canceled on May 5, 2025, as the station had been silent for a year.
