= Old time fiddle =

Style of American fiddling

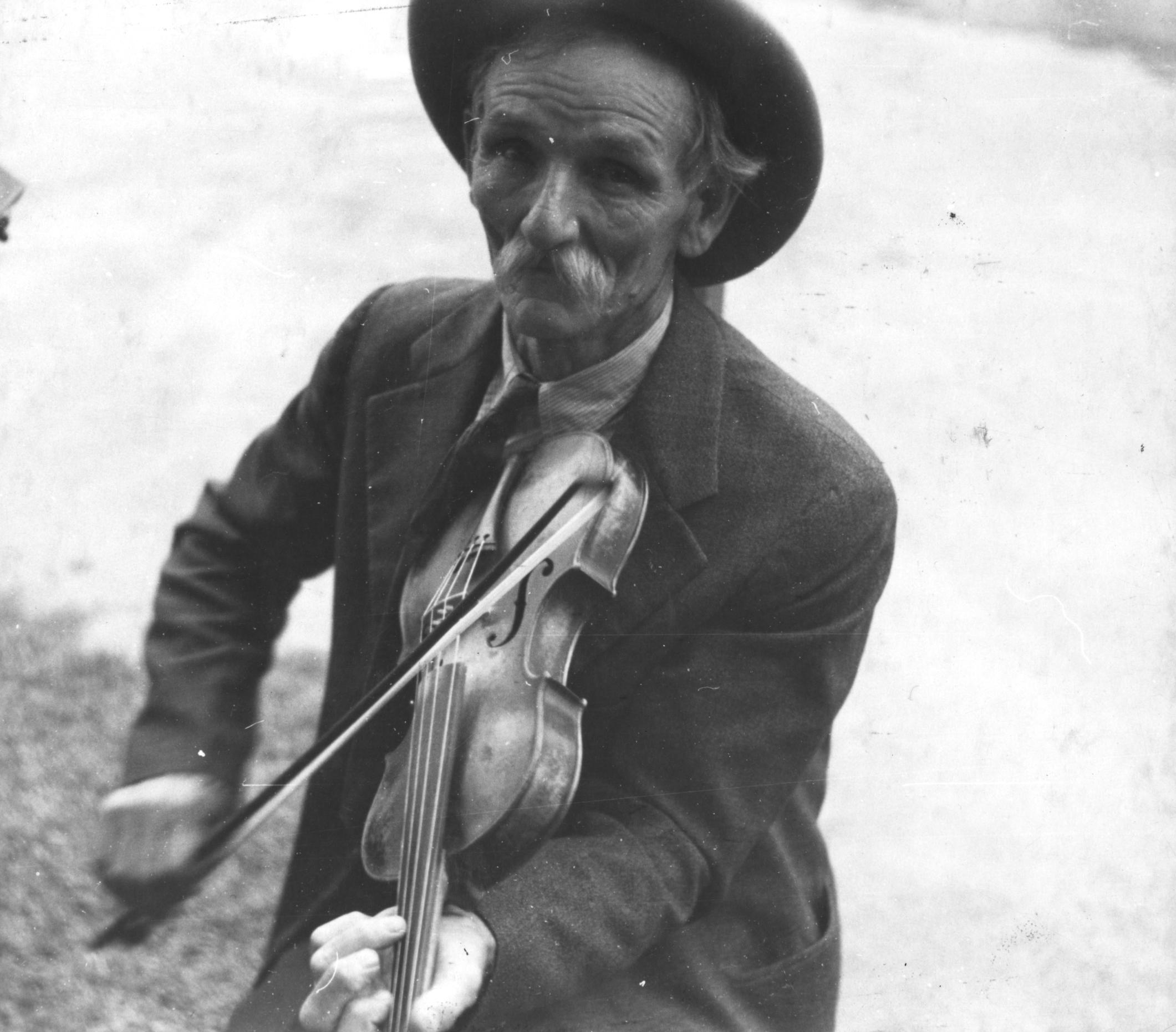
Bill Hensley, Mountain Fiddler, Asheville, North Carolina

Old time (also spelled old-time or oldtime) fiddle is the style of American fiddling found in old-time music. Old time fiddle tunes are derived from European folk dance forms such as the jig, reel, breakdown, schottische, waltz, two-step, and polka. When the fiddle is accompanied by banjo, guitar, mandolin, or other string instruments, the configuration is called a string band. The types of tunes found in old-time fiddling are called "fiddle tunes", even when played by instruments other than a fiddle.

The style originates from the colonization of North America by immigrants from England, France, Germany, Ireland, and Scotland by European Americans, who brought their native fiddling traditions with them, mixed with influence from African-American music. It originated in Appalachia and the American South, but has since spread all over the United States. It is separate and distinct from traditions which it has influenced or which may in part have evolved from it, such as bluegrass, country blues, variants of western swing and country rock.

Starting in the 1920s, some fiddlers, particularly younger ones like Arthur Smith, were swept up in newer music and their style and repertoires reflected influences from blues, ragtime, and Tin Pan Alley. Anyone who wanted to make a career in music had to keep up with the times. But many, like John Salyer and Hiram Stamper cared little for the new music, and stayed with the old-time tunes.

== Definition and distinction of old time fiddle ==
Newer traditions have grown out of old time fiddle music but it retains a separate and distinct identity from those styles. These include bluegrass and Western swing and to some degree country rock. However, the positive statement of what, exactly, constitutes the true and authentic delineation of old time fiddle music is not necessarily unambiguous. Different sources draw a sharper distinction than others, and there is a good deal of overlap which purists will acknowledge to a varying degree. The areas of overlap are primarily in terms of the repertoire of fiddle tunes with the genres of bluegrass and Western swing (Texas swing) playing tunes of the same name, but playing them with a different group dynamic, different stylisms, and very often--for fiddles and banjo--in tunings unique to old-time music.

=== Narrow use of the term ===
Art Stamper played in both Appalachian old time and bluegrass styles. In autobiographical material posted on his artist website, the writer asserts Stamper's contiguity with "old time and mountain" music, that he learned "the Appalachian fiddle style" from his father, but that "Art also played bluegrass fiddle..." continuing that "Whether playing Appalachian fiddle or bluegrass fiddle, Art was a musical marvel."

=== Old Time purists ===
In an essay with the short title Why Old TIme is Different from Bluegrass, Allan Feldman argues against the proposal of an "inclusive cover name that would bring oldtime music, bluegrass, clawgrass and dawg music under the same umbrella in order to attract new audiences. The unfortunate trend in this country is to homogenize things. I think oldtime music stands against homogenization."Having thus staked ground out for himself as a purist, he continues that "he for one celebrates the fact that oldtime music is not bluegrass or dawg music or new grass or even claw grass". He identifies the following categorical distinctions which set Old Time apart:

- "Oldtime" works from different tonal centers
- it uses cross tunings (for fiddle)
- banjos also may use tunings unique to a given tune
- it uses harmonic resonant overtones
- it uses accidentals
- it mixes non-tempered scales with harmonization
- or it is completely modal.

He continues in direct comparison with bluegrass or country western, emphasizing the difference between songs which, as opposed to tunes, have lyrics and are primarily for listening rather than for dancing.

- largely dance centered and not song centered
- many of its songs are verses to dance tunes
- most of its songs were meant for solo and unaccompanied performance in their oldest form.

=== Blending ===
Although there is considerable published opinion sharply distinguishing Old Time from other genres of fiddle music, there is also area of overlap. Unlike many states which support independent old-time and bluegrass associations, the Minnesota Bluegrass & Old-Time Music Association intermingles the genres.

Peter Anick is a noted authority on fiddle music genres and is co-author with David Reiner of Old-Time Fiddling Across America and a contributor of feature articles and "Folk Routes" columns for Fiddler magazine. Old Time Fiddling Across America has selections from Northeast, Southeast and Western regions, but also includes in the same volume "ethnic styles" including Cajun, Irish, Scandinavian, Klezmer, and Eastern European fiddling. This blurring of the lines also occurs in the Vince Gill song titled "Old Time Fiddle", despite referencing the Cajun tune Jolie Blon:

I wanna hear an old time fiddle
Play an old time fiddle song
I might even drink just a little
If you play Little Jolie Blon

== Repertoire ==
=== Traditional old time fiddle tunes ===
This is a partial listing of the old time fiddle repertoire, most of which are in the public domain and have no known authorship. Many of these tunes have rich historical significance.

- "Angeline the Baker"
- "The Arkansas Traveler"
- "Billy in the Lowground"
- "Bonaparte's Retreat"
- "Boil 'em Cabbage Down"
- "Cackling Hen"
- "Casey's Oldtime Waltz"
- "Cherokee Shuffle"
- "Chinquapin Hunting"
- "Cluck Old Hen"
- "Coal Creek March"
- "Coleman's March"
- "Cotton-Eyed Joe"
- "Cripple Creek"
- "Cumberland Gap"
- "Eighth of January"
- "Fire on the Mountain"
- "Forked Deer"
- "Grey Eagle"
- "Hell Among The Yearlings"
- "Hell Broke Loose In Georgia"
- "Jenny Lind"
- "Katy Hill"
- "Last Gold Dollar"
- "Leather Britches"
- "Liberty"
- "Lost Indian"
- "Mississippi Sawyer"
- "Old Joe Clark"
- "Old Molly Hare"
- "Red Wing"
- "Sally Ann"
- "Sally Goodin'"
- "Shoot That Turkey Buzzard"
- "Snow Deer"
- "Soldier's Joy"
- "Spotted Pony "
- "Sugar Hill"
- "Sugar In The Gourd"
- "The Sailor's Hornpipe"
- "Turkey in the Straw"
- "Waltzing in Old San Antone"
- "What Are You Going to Do With the Baby O?"
- "Whiskey Before Breakfast"
- "Whoa Mule"

=== Contemporary old time fiddle tunes ===
Despite the fact that the majority of the old-time fiddle tradition consists of very old tunes with no known authorship, new fiddle tunes have always been written and are still being written today. Some of the most prominent modern fiddle tunes include:

- "Blackberry Blossom"
- "Orange Blossom Special"
- "Tennessee Waltz "
- "Wagon Wheel"
- "Wild Rose of the Mountain"

== History and subgenres ==
Fiddlin' John Carson is one of the canonical historic figures in old time fiddling. Other famous and important figures include Fiddlin' Arthur Smith, Charlie Higgins and countless figures known only in local oral histories.

Old time fiddling has recognized regional variants which are distinguished from regional variants of bluegrass, Celtic and other styles. For instance, Texas Old Time fiddle, is distinct from Texas swing fiddle, Texas blues and Texas rock. It is Old Time, like its relatives in other regional genres (or subgenres) but it is a distinct form in its own right, according to its proponents. For instance, the Texas Old Time Fiddler's Association asserts the uniqueness, and superiority, of the "Texas-style of old time fiddling". In an essay entitled The Origins of the Texas-Style of Traditional Old Time Fiddling, the organizations asserts that "the Texas fiddler avoids the repetition and monotony of the two-part Appalachian fiddle tune in favor of those tunes that are more complex and exceed the two-part limit".

Cajun fiddle is based on French-speaking Acadian culture in Louisiana and Texas and includes copious use of double stops and distinctive rhythms.

== Preservation and propagation ==
Much of contemporary old time fiddling is taught at local, regional and national fiddler's meetups. The traditional authentic method of learning to play is based upon an oral tradition as with all folk music forms. Traditions are maintained by Old Time Fiddler's Associations throughout the US. America's Old Time Fiddler's Hall of Fame is maintained by the National Traditional Country Music Association located in Pioneer Music Museum in Anita, Iowas. Film is also a major means of preserving and propagating old time music.

=== Festivals, contests and fiddle camps ===
Breakin' Up Winter

The Fiddler's Grove Ole Time Fiddler's & Bluegrass Festival bills itself as the home of the oldest continuous old time fiddling contest in North America.

According to Winifred Ward, fiddle contests "evolved from being endurance fiddling events to playing a set number of tunes". Contests are highly evolved in Texas, where twin fiddling is also popular.

The national contest is held in June of each year in Weiser, Idaho.

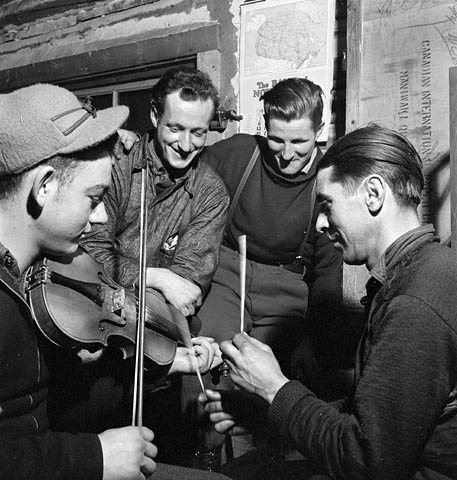
Working lumberjacks playing fiddle 1943

==== Art and Charlie Stamper ====
With their home on the National Register of Historic Places, the Stamper family of Knott County Kentucky has been producing fiddling talent for generations. Bluegrass Hall of Famer, Art Stamper, played old-time bluegrass fiddle with well-known names in the business, like Ralph and Carter Stanley, Bill Monroe, Larry Sparks, the Goins Brothers, Jim and Jesse. He was also instrumental in preserving and promoting the old-time roots of bluegrass as the genre developed.

Eldest brother Charlie Stamper never pursued music professionally as Art had, but he did learn the instrument first. He recently recorded his debut album at age 84. Appalshop/June Appal Records' "Glory to the Meeting House" consists of the first recordings ever released by Charlie. Many tunes were learned from his father Hiram Stamper, whose music has been archived by Berea College.

Says Charlie, "I was the first one in the family to play the fiddle and I was the first one to play on the radio. My dad [Hiram Stamper] played fiddle, banjo, and French harp, which is what we called a harmonica. I remember when I was five or six, I would sit on the floor between his legs as he played the fiddle, his big foot keeping time as it hit the floor."

==== Carolina Chocolate Drops ====
The Drops are an old-time string band from North Carolina but their music defies easy categorization. Their view of tradition is well expressed by a quote prominently featured on their website:

"Tradition is a guide, not a jailer. We play in an older tradition but we are modern musicians."

Their album Genuine Negro Jig (2010) won the Grammy Award for Best Traditional Folk Album. Members Rhiannon Giddens, Dom Flemons, and Justin Robinson play a variety of instruments including fiddle, banjo, guitar, and kazoo. Much of their repertoire is based on the traditional music of the Piedmont region of North and South Carolina, and from the eminent African American old-time fiddler Joe Thompson, although they also perform old-time versions of some modern songs such as Blu Cantrell's R&B hit "Hit 'em Up Style (Oops!)."

==== Foghorn Stringband ====
Formerly known as Foghorn Leghorn, this Portland Oregon band describes itself as "ass kickin' redneck" music. Their fiddler, Stephen 'Sammy' Lind, plays with no shoulder rest and allows the instrument to rest at a comfortably low position that is often found in old-time fiddling. He also "chokes" the bow, a bow technique not found in classical violin playing or in other folk styles.

=== New Lost City Ramblers ===
The New Lost City Ramblers are an old-time string band that formed in New York City in 1958 during the Folk Revival. The founding members of the Ramblers, or NLCR, are Mike Seeger, John Cohen, and Tom Paley. Tom Paley later left the group and was replaced by Tracy Schwarz.

The New Lost City Ramblers not only directly participated in the old-time music revival, but has continued to directly influence countless musicians who have followed. They feature twin fiddles.

== Partial list of notable old-time fiddlers ==
- Charlie Acuff
- Benny Thomasson
- Joe Birchfield - Roan Mountain Hilltoppers
- Bill Birchfield - Roan Mountain Hilltoppers
- Bus Boyk
- French Carpenter
- Al Cherny
- Jimmy Costa
- Junior Daugherty
- Clyde Davenport
- Uncle Bob Douglas
- Howdy Forrester
- Rayna Gellert
- A. A. Gray Archived March 21, 2014, at the Wayback Machine
- G. B. Grayson
- Ed Haley
- Fiddlin' Sid Harkreader
- Charlie Higgins
- Bob Holt
- Ben Jarrell
- Tommy Jarrell
- Earl Johnson
- Harry Johnson
- Hank Poitras
- Bert Layne
- Brad Leftwich
- Dan Levenson
- Stephen 'Sammy' Lind
- Bill Livers
- Clark Kessinger
- Uncle Jimmy McCarroll
- Lester McCumbers
- Kirk McGee
- Clayton McMichen
- Bruce Molsky
- Frazier Moss
- Fred Price
- Red Clay Ramblers
- Eck Robertson
- Posey Rorer
- Alvin Sanderson
- Tracy Schwarz
- Mike Seeger
- Fiddlin' Arthur Smith
- John Specker
- Art Stamper
- Charlie Stamper
- Lowe Stokes
- Uncle Bunt Stephens
- Gid Tanner
- Joe Thompson
- Uncle Jimmy Thompson
- Paul Warren
- Melvin Wine
- Marcus Martin
- Luther Strong
- W.H. Stepp
- Joe Thompson

== Old-time fiddle set up ==
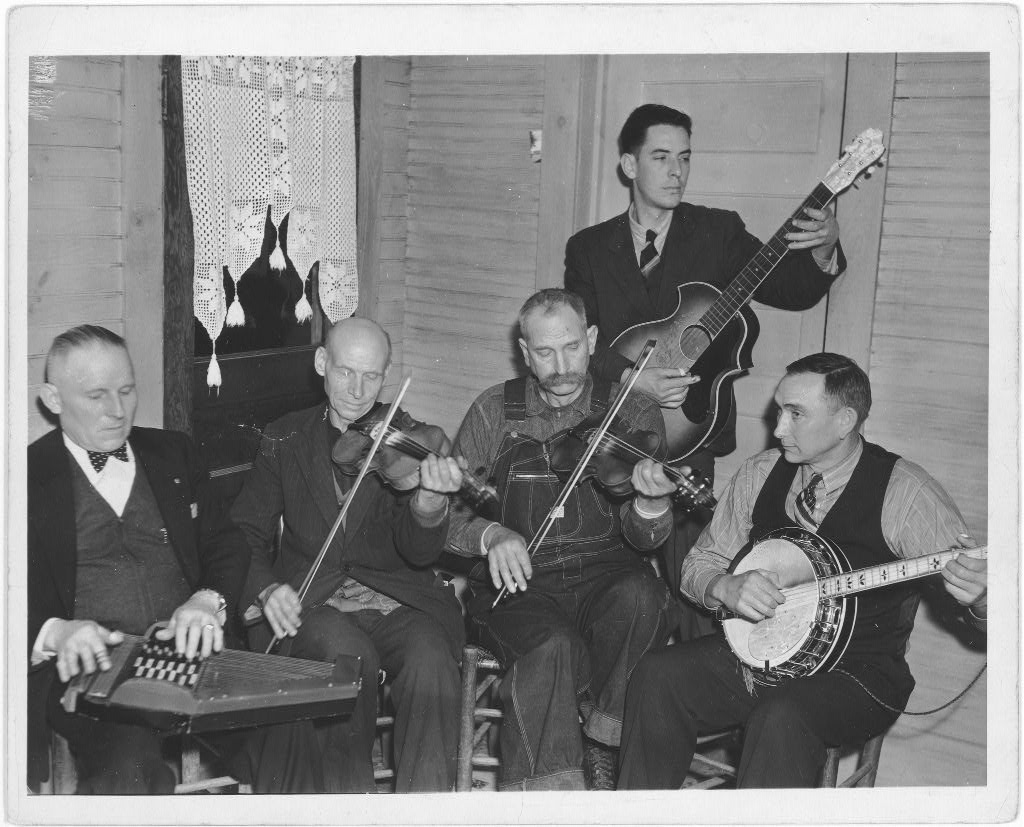
The Bog Trotters Band, photographed in Galax, Virginia, in 1937

The fiddle used in playing old-time fiddle tunes is essentially a violin, which may be somewhat modified to accommodate old-time playing technique. These modifications include:

- flattening the bridge slightly which makes it easier to perform rapid "double" shuffles which alternate between string pairs. This is not done in Irish, Scottish and most other fiddle styles.
- fiddle players in general more commonly use four fine tuners, where violinists may use only one, for the solid-steel E string.
- Old time fiddlers may dispense with chin rests entirely. Many do not use a shoulder rest, or use a rustic version of one, such as a kitchen sponge held to the fiddle with a rubber band.

== See also ==
- Western swing fiddle
- Cajun fiddle
- Canadian fiddle
- American fiddle
