= Adolph Hofner =

American singer-songwriter

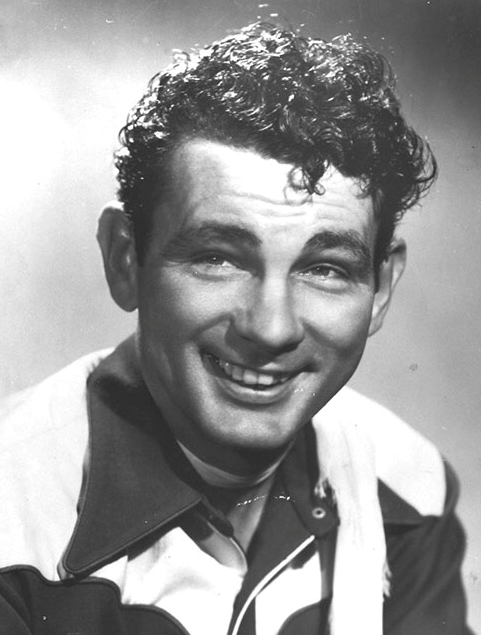

Background information
- Born: Adolph John Hofner; June 8, 1916; Moulton, Texas, U.S.
- Died: June 2, 2000 (aged 83) San Antonio
- Genres: Western swing, polka
- Occupations: Bandleader, singer
- Years active: 1932–1993
- Labels: OKeh, Columbia, Sarg, Bluebird

Adolph John Hofner (June 8, 1916 – June 2, 2000) was an American Western swing bandleader and singer.

== Biography ==
Hofner was born into a family of Czech-German origin. He grew up listening to Czech and Hawaiian music. When he was ten years old his family moved to San Antonio. He and his younger brother Emil and Simon Garcia formed the Hawaiian Serenaders and performed locally. Influenced by Milton Brown and Bob Wills, Hofner became a singer in a band that played what was later called Western swing, a combination of country music and jazz. He kept his day job as a mechanic while performing at night in clubs in San Antonio.

In the 1930s, Hofner, Emil, and fiddler Jimmie Revard started the band the Oklahoma Playboys. Hofner made his first recordings with them as singer and guitarist. He made his solo debut in 1938 when he was offered a contract with Bluebird Records. With support from Eli Oberstein, the recording manager of Bluebird, Hofner formed the western swing band Adolph Hofner and His Texans. They made their recording debut on April 5, 1938 and they played their first gig outside Leming, Texas on May 13, 1939. Meanwhile, he recorded with Tom Dickey's Show Boys. This band had a surprise hit with Floyd Tillman's melancholy honky tonk song "It Makes No Difference Now" with Adolph singing. Hofner and his Texans had their first and biggest hit in 1940 with "Maria Elena".

In 1941, Hofner signed a recording contract with Okeh. During World War II, he and his band were hired by the Burt "Foreman" Phillips chain of dance halls to perform around Los Angeles under the name Dolph Hofner and His San Antonians. Some of his hits during this period were "Alamo Rag", Cotton-Eyed Joe", and "Jessie Polka". Despite his relative success, he failed to have his contract renewed and he returned to Texas. Sponsored by Pearl Beer in 1950, he formed the Pearl Wranglers, performing at KTSA in San Antonio with a musical mix of swing, country, rockabilly, and polka. They recorded for the obscure Sarg label.

Among the Czech-American songs they recorded, many with the original Czech lyrics, are the "Happy Go Lucky Polka", "The Prune Waltz", "Julida Polka", "Green Meadow Polka", "Barbara Polka", and "Farewell to Prague" ("Kdyz Jsme Opustili Prahu"). In order to accommodate their sponsor, Pearl Beer, the Hofners recorded the original version of "Farewell to Prague", which had been known in the old country, instead of the more recent Czech-American "Shiner Beer Polka", the same song with the word "Prague" ("Prahu") changed to "Shiner". This avoided the implied reference to rival Spoetzl Brewery in Shiner, Spoetzl's being closely identified with the "Shiner Beer Polka". But the brothers could not resist inserting a joke in Czech at the end of the recording. When one of the Hofners asks the other to "give me a dark beer" ("Daj mne cervene pivo"), Spoetzl's Shiner Bock being the most well-known dark beer in Texas at that time, the other brother firmly replies, "No!" ("Ne!").

In the mid-1980s, Hofner and the Pearl Wranglers were filmed at 'The Farmer's Daughter' dance hall for the British Channel 4 series "The A to Z of C & W". Hofner's career ended in 1993 when he suffered a stroke. He died in June 2000.

== Discography ==
- Dude Ranch Dances (Columbia H-13 [4-disc 78 rpm album set], 1949; Columbia HL-9017 [10"], 1950)
- German Folk Dances (Imperial FD-541 [10"], 1954)
- Country and Western Dance-O-Rama, No. 4 (Decca DL-5564 [10"], 1955)
- Your Friend Adolph Hofner (Sarg SLPS-1803, 1973)
- Western Swing – Vol. 2 (Historic Recordings) (Arhoolie/Old Timey OT-116, 1975)
- Western Swing – Vol. 3 (Historic Recordings) (Arhoolie/Old Timey OT-117, 1975)
- Rollin' Along (An Anthology of Western Swing) (Tishomingo Tsho-2220, 1976)
- South Texas Swing (Arhoolie/Folklyric LP-5020, 1980; CD-7029, 1994) OCLC 31863135
- Western Swing, Blues, Boogie and Honky Tonk – Volume 8 (The 1940's & 50's) (Arhoolie/Old Timey OT-123, 1981)
- OKeh Western Swing (Epic EG-37324 [2LP], 1982; CBS Special Products CD-A-37324, 1989)
- The Texas-Czech, Bohemian, & Moravian Bands (Historic Recordings 1929–1959) Arhoolie/Folklyric LP-9031, 1983; CD-7026, 1993) OCLC 30394604
- Country: Nashville-Dallas-Hollywood 1927–1942 (Frémeaux & Associés FA-015 [2CD], 1994)
- Western Swing: Texas 1928–1944 (Frémeaux & Associés FA-032 [2CD], 1994) OCLC 37799161
- Stompin' Western Swing (Roots of Rock 'N' Roll, Volume 2) (President PLCD-552, 1996)
- Hillbilly Blues 1928–1946 (Frémeaux & Associés FA-065 [2CD], 1997) OCLC 222283540
- Smile & Jive: Kings of the Western Swing (Charly CDGR-182 [2CD], 1997)
- Adolph Hofner and the Pearl Wranglers (Sarg CD-2-101 [2CD], 1998)
- Doughboys, Playboys and Cowboys: The Golden Years of Western Swing (Proper BOX 6 [4CD], 1999) OCLC 44555137
- The Sarg Records Anthology (South Texas 1954–1964) (Bear Family BCD-16296 [4CD], 1999)
- Western Swing: As Good As It Gets (Disky DO-247362 [2CD], 2000)
- Kings of Western Swing (Pazzazz [Germany] PAZZ-040 [2CD], 2004)
- Western Swing and Country Jazz (JSP 7742 [4CD], 2005)
- Stompin' Singers & Western Swingers (More from the Golden Age of Western Swing) (Proper BOX 83 [4CD], 2006)
- Western Swing: 40 Bootstompers From The Golden Age (Primo [Czech Republic] 6008 [2CD], 2006)
- Swing With The Music (B.A.C.M. [British Archive of Country Music] CD-D-297, 2010)
- You Oughta See My Fanny Dance (Previously Unissued Western Swing 1935–1942) (Bear Family BCD-16532, 2011)
