= Blackberry Blossom (tune) =

"Blackberry Blossom" is a fiddle tune in the key of G major. It is classified as a "breakdown" and is popular in old time, bluegrass and Celtic traditional circles.

== History ==
The tune has been in over 250 tune books. The tune became popular as recorded by Fiddlin' Arthur Smith. That version, according to Alan Jabbour, supplanted an earlier tune played by Santford Kelly from Morgan County, Kentucky, which is now represented by the tune "Yew Piney Mountain". The Yew Piney Mountain variant is also called "Garfield's Blackberry Blossom", perhaps to distinguish it from the earlier version. Of the two tunes, Andrew Kuntz writes to the effect that "Betty Vornbrock and others have noted a similarity between 'Garfield’s Blackberry Blossom' and the West Virginia tune 'Yew Piney Mountain', a variant ... also played by Kentucky fiddlers J.P. Fraley and Santford Kelly". Alan Snyder gives an alternate name of "Strawberry Beds". It is not clear whether the earlier melody of Garfield's Blackberry Blossom evolved into Arthur Smith's version or if the two were always separate. Charles Wolfe wrote in his book “The Devil’s Box” that Smith's tune was named in a radio contest in which listeners submitted suggestions for his unnamed piece.

== Culture ==
Although the tune is closely associated with the old time/ bluegrass traditions of the United States, it enjoys the distinction of being frequently played by traditional Irish musicians.

=== In Celtic music ===
This is a partial list of covers by Irish musicians and bands.

- Feódoga Stáin - tin whistle classics by Mary Bergin
- An Fhidil, Sraith 2 by Sean Keane, Kevin Burke, Paddy Glackin And Seamus Creagh
- Ireland's Best Session Tunes CD 1 by Waltons Recording
- Irish Dances by Various Artists
- Top Of Coom by Conal Ó'Gráda
- Traditional Irish Dance Music by All Star Ceilidhe Band
- Traditional Irish Dance Music: All Star Ceili Band by Joe Derrane
- Traditional Irish Music by William Sullivan
- Traditional Irish Tunes Played On The Tin Whistle (1/2) by Geraldine Cotter
- Traditional Music Of Ireland by Various Artists
- Natalie MacMaster in Four on the Floor (cassette)

=== In Bluegrass ===
According to Devon Wells, "Blackberry Blossom", as a banjo tune, was brought to the public's attention as one of the earliest arrangements of Bill Keith. Wells, a bluegrass teacher, asserts that the tune is a standard in the bluegrass banjo repertoire.

Tony Rice recorded an influential version of the tune on the album, “Manzanita.” The subsequent Mark O’Connor recording is a more progressive improvisational interpretation. There are many other recorded versions by Bluegrass artists and the tune is often used as a vehicle for improvisation.

Some of the older recordings archived at the Digital Library of Appalachia include:

- Fiddle tune played by Clyde Davenport at the Berea College Celebration of Traditional Music on November 3, 1984
- Fiddle tune played by Carlton Rawlings and recorded by John Harrod in Bath County, Kentucky in the 1970s

== Structure ==
Like most fiddle tunes, "Blackberry Blossom" has an A part and a B part. In Arthur Smith's 1935 version, the A part is in the key of G major, with C and D chords in the second half of the part; the B part introduces an E major chord, making for a rather unusual mood shift.

Later recorded versions changed the harmonic structure of this tune radically, introducing additional faster chord changes in the A part (which are substitutions that fit the melody line) and in the B part changing the original E major to E minor and the original G to B7.

The key of E minor is the relative minor of the key of G major - it uses the same sharps and flats but its modal center is E rather than G. Using E minor makes for a more "standard" harmonic structure because the E major represents a sudden modulation.

Melodically, according to Anthony, "The note played on the 1st & 3rd beat of the first 2 measures are the first 4 notes of the descending scale of G. Each of these notes is the beginning of a 3-note run, returning to this base note, before moving on to the next note in the G scale."

== See also ==
- Old time music
- Old time fiddle
- Appalachian music
