= Cliff Bruner =

American Western Swing fiddler and bandleader (1915–2000)

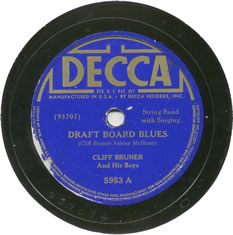
- One of Cliff Bruner's recordings

Background information
- Born: Clifton Lafayette Bruner; April 25, 1915; Texas City, Texas, U.S.
- Died: August 25, 2000 (aged 85) Texas City, Texas, U.S.
- Genres: Western swing
- Years active: 1930s - 1980s
- Formerly of: Milton Brown and His Musical Brownies; The Texas Wanderers

Clifton Lafayette Bruner (April 25, 1915 – August 25, 2000) was a fiddler and bandleader of the Western Swing era of the 1930s and 1940s. Bruner's music combined elements of traditional string band music, improvisation, blues, folk, and popular melodies of the times.

== Biography ==
Bruner was born in Texas City, Texas, and spent most of his childhood near Houston. He learned to play fiddle, and traveled with medicine shows to begin his musical career. Milton Brown's Musical Brownies drafted Bruner in 1935. Bruner played with the ensemble's classically trained fiddler Cecil Brower to create the memorable double fiddle sound of Milton Brown's group. Bruner recorded with Brown's group on the Decca music label, until Brown was killed in an automobile accident in 1936. This ended Bruner's involvement in the group.

That same year (1936), Bruner moved to Houston and formed The Texas Wanderers, a band that included Lee Bell (de) on electric guitar, Bob Dunn on electric steel guitar, Leo Raley on mandolin, J. R. Chatwell on fiddle, Dickie McBride on guitar and vocals, and Moon Mullican on vocals and piano. The Wanderers recorded on the Decca and Mercury Records labels. His songs had a special southern characteristic including songs about truck driving, lost love, the draft, and ill repute.

Cliff Bruner is an unsung star of the little-noted Country music charts that appeared in Billboard prior to 1944. His hit "It Makes No Difference Now" spent twenty weeks atop the chart. Other hits in 1939–1942 included "Sorry," "Kelly Swing", "I'll Keep On Loving You", and "When You're Smiling".

The Bruners were living in Amarillo when his first wife, Ella Ruth Leger died. Ella Ruth had a brother named Leroy Leger who was a Lieutenant Colonel the Air Force and worked for General Douglas MacArthur during the occupation of Japan and also lived in the Panama Canal and retired in San Antonio Texas. When Ella Ruth died this left Clifton with two small children to raise, Bruner returned to Houston, married a second woman named Ruth, and continued to work in his own insurance company. He pursued music on the side, playing on weekends with local musicians. He died of cancer on August 25, 2000, and was survived by his wife, six daughters, seventeen grandchildren, sixteen great-grandchildren, and five great-great-grandchildren. Bruner was inducted into the Texas Music Hall of Fame and the Western Swing Society Hall of Fame, as well as the Texas Western Swing Hall of Fame.

Perhaps his most famous hit was "Truck Drivers' Blues," the first truck driving song. Many of these recordings featured future singer piano star, Moon Mullican, on vocals. Bruner's big band disbanded in the 1950s, however, he continued to play music, and his trio appeared in the 1984 Sally Field movie Places in the Heart.

== Death ==
Bruner died of cancer on August 25, 2000, aged 85.

== Selected discography ==
- "Milk Cow Blues" (Decca, 1937)
- "Can't Nobody Truck Like Me" (Decca, 1937)
- "Corrine Corrina" (Decca, 1937)
- "Sunbonnet Sue" (Decca, 1938)
- "Oh How I Miss You Tonight" (Decca, 1938)
- "River Stay 'Way From My Door" (Decca, 1938)
- "I Wish I Could Shimmy Like My Sister Kate" (Decca, 1938)
- "When You're Smiling" (Decca, 1939)
- "Truck Driver's Blues" (Decca, 1939)
- "San Antonio Rose" (Decca, 1939)
- "Because" (Decca, 1940)
- "Draft Board Blues" (Decca, 1941)
- "That's What I Like About The South" (Decca, 1946)
- "Unfaithful One" (AYO, 1949)
- "I'll Try Not To Cry" (Coral, 1950)

== See also ==
- Moon Mullican
- Bob Dunn

== References links ==
General references

- The Jazz of the Southwest, An Oral History of Western Swing, by Jean A. Boyd, University of Texas Press, 1998 OCLC 44955610 ISBN 978-0-292-70860-0
- A Guide to the Delmer Rogers Collection, 1987-1994, Briscoe Center for American History, The University of Texas at Austin

The Texas Western Swing Hall of Fame: Interview with Cliff Bruner and Roy Lee Brown OCLC 26919202

- Cliff Bruner Biography, by James Manheim, Allmusic, Rovi Corporation (retrieved March 15, 2013)
