= Larry Reed =

Larry Reed may refer to:

- Larry Reed (puppeteer) (1944–2026), American shadow puppeteer
- Lawrence Reed (born 1953), president of the Foundation for Economic Education
- Larry Reed, bassist with Shoot Low Sheriff
- Lawrence Reed, the suspect in the 2025 Chicago attack

== See also ==
- Larry Reid (disambiguation)
- Lawrence Reade (disambiguation)
