= Stogner =

Stogner is a surname. Notable people with the surname include:

- Austin Stogner (born 2000), American footballer
- Dave Stogner (1920–1989), American musician

== See also ==
- Stogner v. California, 2003 lawsuit
