= Yew Piney Mountain =

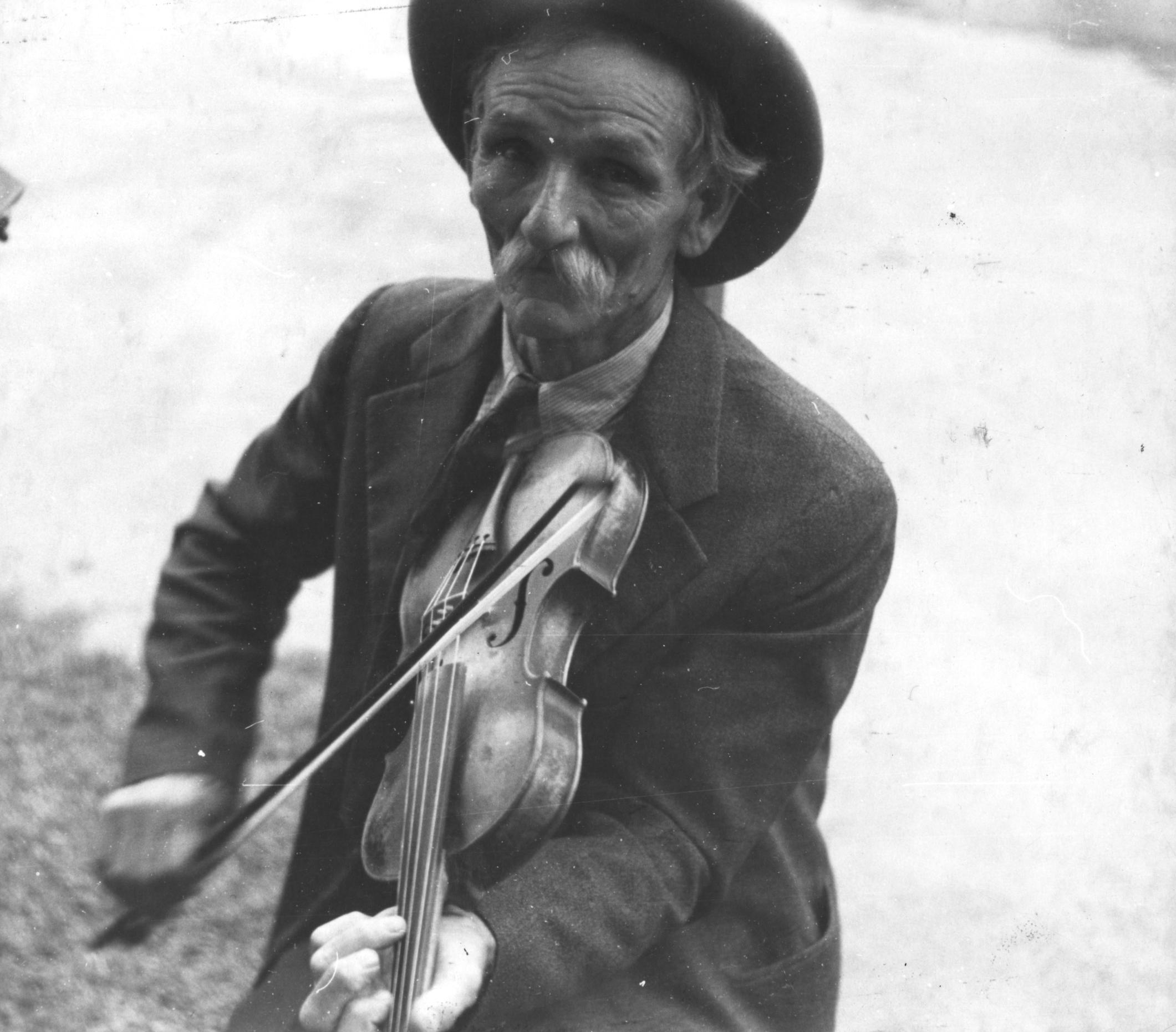
Bill Henseley, mountain fiddler, Asheville, North Carolina

"Yew Piney Mountain" is part of the canonical Appalachian music tradition which has been highly influential in American fiddle tradition generally, including its old time fiddle and bluegrass fiddle branches. According to Alan Jabbour at the Digital Library of Appalachia, the tune was called "Blackberry Blossom" until that title was taken over by a different tune. The earlier "Blackberry Blossom", as played by Sanford Kelly from Morgan County, is now represented by the tune "Yew Piney Mountain".

Differing from Jabbour, however, another influential secondary source, Andrew Kuntz's Fiddler's Companion, asserts that the tunes are related. Contradicting Jabbour, who clearly distinguishes the earlier version, is the account of Andrew Kuntz to the effect that "Betty Vornbrock and others have noted a similarity between 'Garfield’s Blackberry Blossom' and the West Virginia tune 'Yew Piney Mountain', a variant...also played by Kentucky fiddlers J.P. Fraley and Santford Kelly".

== Culture: history and influence ==
According to Andy Kurtz, similarities between an unspecified variant of "Blackberry Blossom", which may be the different song identified by Jabbour as today's "Yew Piney Mountain", were acknowledged in the literature. Betty Vornbrock and others have noted a similarity between "Garfield’s Blackberry Blossom" and the West Virginia tune "Yew Piney Mountain," a variant. Whichever version that overlap refers to, it was reportedly also played by the well known Kentucky fiddler J.P. Fraley and the more obscure Owen "Snake" Chapman, as well as by Santford Kelly and others.

The tune is such a solid exemplar of Americana that it is the title of a radio show, Yew Piney Mountain, which airs on Wednesdays from 6-7 pm CST on KRUI, 89.7 FM in Iowa City, Iowa. It is also the name of a Smithsonian Folkways compilation.

== Bibliographic resources ==
- Stacy Phillips' Phillips Collection of American Fiddle Tunes, Vol. 1 (Mel Bay Pub.)
- Andrew Kuntz's Fiddler's Companion

== Graphic, audio and videographic resources ==
- The Digital Library of Appalachia provides online access to archival and historical materials related to the culture of the southern and central Appalachian region. The contents of the DLA are drawn from special collections of Appalachian College Association member libraries. It has about twenty files pertaining to "Yew Piney Mountain."
- Lester McCumbers Oct 9, 2008 Kim Johnson banjo, Gerry Milnes, guitar
- Piney Mountain, full band, by prominent pedagogue Darol Anger
- Sheet music for Yew Piney Mountain here
- The Digital Library of Appalachia provides online access to archival and historical materials related to the culture of the southern and central Appalachian region. The contents of the DLA are drawn from special collections of Appalachian College Association member libraries.
- Hawks and Owls Stringband version

== See also ==
- Old time music
- Old time fiddle
- Skillet Lickers
