= Jimmy Wyble =

American jazz and Western swing guitarist (1922–2010)

- Born: James Otis Wyble; January 25, 1922; Port Arthur, Texas
- Died: January 16, 2010 (aged 87) Los Angeles, California
- Genres: Jazz, Western swing
- Occupation: Musician
- Instrument: Guitar
- Years active: 1940s–2010

James Otis Wyble (January 25, 1922 – January 16, 2010) was an American guitarist noted for his contributions to jazz and Western swing.

== Career ==
A native of Port Arthur, Texas, Wyble worked in his early years for a radio station in Houston. He and guitarist Cameron Hill played Western swing in a band led by Burt "Foreman" Phillips. The sound of two guitars attracted Bob Wills, another fan of Western swing, and he hired both men for his band, the Texas Playboys.

Wyble's music career was interrupted by World War II. He served in the Army from 1942 to 1946, and he returned to music after he came home. Although he continued to play in Western swing bands, his interest in jazz surfaced on his debut album, The Jimmy Wyble Quintet (1953). Soon after, he worked with Barney Kessel and Benny Goodman, and played with Red Norvo for eight years, including on a tour of Australia accompanying Frank Sinatra.

Wyble took a job as a studio musician in Los Angeles during the 1960s, working as a guitarist for movies and television. Wyble played guitar on movie soundtracks, including The Wild Bunch, Ocean's Eleven, Everything You Always Wanted to Know About Sex and Kings Go Forth, and played on TV shows such as The Flip Wilson Show and Kraft Music Hall. On the side, he took classical guitar lessons from Laurindo Almeida, then taught guitar to other students, among them Larry Koonse, Howard Roberts, Howard Alden and Steve Lukather.

In the 1970s he developed a two-line contrapuntal approach to guitar and composed numerous etudes in this style. Many of these pieces were published in Classical/Country (Howard Roberts-Playback, 1973), The Art of Two-Line Improvisation (PMP, 1979), and Concepts for the Classical and Jazz Guitar (Mel Bay, 2000).

During the 1980s, he left the music business to take care of his ailing wife. He returned to performing in 2005. Larry Koonse, his former student, issued the album What's in the Box (2007) with compositions by Wyble based on his book of etudes. Wyble was a teacher and performer until his death at age 87 in 2010.

== Discography ==
=== As leader ===
- The Jimmy Wyble Quintet (1953)
- Jimmy Wyble & Love Brothers (1977)
- Classical/Jazz: Live On Tape (Jazz Chronicles, 1977)
- Etudes (Jazz Chronicles, 1978)
- Diane (Vantage, 2003)

=== As sideman ===
With Red Norvo

- Hi-FIve (RCA Victor, 1957)
- Red Plays the Blues (RCA Victor, 1958)
- Windjammer City Style (Dot, 1958)
- Norvo... Naturally! (Rave 1962)
- Midsummer Night's Songs (RCA 1974)

With others

- Benny Goodman, The Sound of Music (EMI, 1959)
- Benny Goodman, Benny Goodman Swings Again (Columbia, 1960)
- Bob Harrington, Vibraphone Fantasy in Jazz with Bob Harrington (Imperial, 1957)
- Bob Harrington, Jazz a La Carte (Crown, 1963)
- Jackie Kelso, Dirty Old Men (Jazz Chronicles, 1970)
- The Manhattan Transfer, Extensions (Atlantic, 1979)
- Oscar Moore, Barney Kessel, Tal Farlow, Swing Guitars (Verve/Norgran, 1993)
- Shorty Rogers, Shorty Rogers and His Giants Vol 2 the Rarest (RCA 1983)
- Sons of the Pioneers, Western Country (Granite, 1976)
- Dinah Shore, Dinah Sings Some Blues with Red (Capitol, 1985)
