= Burt Phillips =

American disc jockey, bandleader, and music promoter

Burt (or Bert) Phillips, nicknamed "Foreman", was an American disc jockey, bandleader, and music promoter in the 1940s.

Phillips was a major promoter of the music artist Spade Cooley. Beginning in 1942, he was the first to use the term Western swing, as a sub-genre of country music. He and Cooley would later have a falling out, leading to Phillips firing him.

Phillips promoted country-western barn dance programs at a string of dance halls in the Los Angeles area in the 1940s, led by the old Town Hall building, situated at 400 South Long Beach Boulevard, in Compton, California, near Long Beach, which had a capacity of around 3,000.

During World War II, Phillips hired Adolph Hofner to play at his dance halls. He also hired Jimmy Wyble.

== Sources ==
- Komorowski, Adam. Spade Cooley: Swingin' The Devil's Dream. Proper PVCD 127, 2003, booklet.
- Logsdon, Guy. "The Cowboy's Bawdy Music", in The Cowboy: Six-Shooters, Songs, and Sex, edited by Charles W. Harris and Buck Rainey. University of Oklahoma Press, 2001. ISBN 978-0-8061-1341-8.
- Compiled by staff of the Country Music Hall of Fame. The Encyclopedia of Country Music. Oxford University Press, 1998. ISBN 0-19-511671-2
- Tribe, Ivan M. Country: A Regional Exploration. Greenwood Publishing Group, 2006.
- Carlin, Richard Peter. Country Music: A Biographical Dictionary. Taylor & Francis, 2003.
