= Larry Reid =

Larry Reid may refer to:

- Larry Reid (musician), musician with The Cinematics
- Larry Reid (basketball), coached the Tennessee State Tigers basketball team

== See also ==
- Larry Reed (disambiguation)
- Lawrence A. Reid, American linguist
