= The Dusty Chaps =

- Origin: Tucson, AZ
- Genres: Country rock; Western swing
- Years active: 1969–1980s

The Dusty Chaps was an American country rock band based in Tucson, AZ from 1969 through the early 1980s. In 1975 they released their first album Honky Tonk Music on a small Tucson label, Bandoleer Records. The band subsequently signed with Capitol Records and rerecorded Honky Tonk Music with an added track in 1977. They released another album on Capitol, Domino Joe (1978). Band members included Peter Gierlach (vocals, accordion); George Hawke (bass, acoustic guitar, background vocals); Pat McAndrew (electric guitar); Leonardo Lopez (drums, percussion); Steve Solomon (keyboards, saxophone, clarinet, vibraphone); Bill Emrie (violin); Red Davidson (piano, accordion, vibraphone, marimba); and Ted Hockenbury (pedal steel guitar). For some time the Chaps were the house band at Tucson's renowned Stumble Inn as well as the Poco Loco.

Steve Solomon (1949–2005) was a lifelong musician and played saxophones, keyboards, and flute for the Dusty Chaps in the late 1970s in Tucson, AZ. On their album, "Honky-Tonk Music" (Capitol ST-11614), he was featured on "Juke Joint Daddy", "Invisible Man" and "Rounder". Steve's talents were also featured prominently on their album, "Domino Joe" (Capitol ST-11755). Steve Solomon's composition, "Houd-Da" was used as the introduction to the song "Domino Joe", though not credited on the album. The introduction to the song "Annabelle Walker" was actually Steve Solomon's composition "The Kool School" though he was not credited, although he was credited with writing the introductory 32 and 16 bars respectively of those songs in the liner notes of the album.

Peter Gierlach is a horticulturist of native desert plants, and currently resides in Cochise County, AZ. Concert pianist David Syme, who now resides in Houston, Texas and in Ireland, played on several tracks on the "Domino Joe" album.

The Chaps' album Domino Joe was notable in that it was a concept album in which all songs segued, forming two continual suites (sides A & B of the LP) and maintaining conceptual continuity throughout. The songs were well written and executed, even if the lyrics occasionally included the irresistible pun (e.g. chili today and hot tamale)
