= French Carpenter =

- Born: June 7, 1899; Clay County, West Virginia US
- Died: May 22, 1965 (aged 65)
- Genre: Old time
- Occupation: Musician
- Instrument: Fiddle

David French Carpenter, born June 7, 1899, in Clay County, West Virginia died May 22, 1965, was a noted West Virginia mountaineer old time fiddle player. He is listed by the Library of Congress as a musician on two sound recordings: Elzics Farewell, Kanawha, 1976; and Old-time music from Clay County, West Virginia, Charleston, West Virginia, Folk Promotions, 1964.
