= Dan Levenson (musician) =

American old-time musician

- Born: 1955 (age 70–71); Pittsburgh, Pennsylvania, U.S.
- Origin: Cleveland, Ohio
- Genres: Old-time; clawhammer
- Occupations: Musician; writer; educator
- Instruments: Banjo; fiddle
- Years active: (1989–present)
- Formerly of: Boiled Buzzards; Hotfoot Duo; Blue Rose Duo
- Website: clawdan.com

YouTube information
- Channel: Dan Levenson
- Years active: 2007–present
- Genre: Old-time music
- Subscribers: 956
- Views: 145,741
- Last updated: April 16, 2024

Dan Levenson (born c. 1955) is an American old-time musician, storyteller, writer and educator. Specializing in Appalachian music, he sings, dances, and plays the five-string banjo, fiddle, and guitar.

== Early life ==
Dan Levenson grew up in Pittsburgh, where his parents met at a square dance. At home, his parents enjoyed listening to a wide variety of musical genres including classical, folk, old-time, and jazz, and they liked to dance to hillbilly-style music. His mother was a singer in her temple's choir, and played the guitar and piano. From a young age, Levenson trained on those instruments along with the violin. After graduating from the University of Pittsburgh with two master's degrees—one of those was in public administration—he first took a job as a social worker in Rochester, New York, and later worked for the state of Pennsylvania.

== Musical career ==
Levenson first became reacquainted with old-time music while living in Rochester. His interest in the genre deepened after working as a photographer at music festivals, and then as a manager for five years at Goose Acres Folk Music Center in Cleveland, becoming totally immersed in banjo playing during this period. He learned about the art of storytelling by noticing how folk singer Pete Seeger captivated his audience during a heavy rainstorm at Point State Park in Pittsburgh. Later, after meeting Seeger at the Second Tennessee Banjo Institute and asking the artist about the intricacies of his method and delivery, he replied, "Dan, you just tell your story". Levenson typically uses a story to introduce the next song in his set list.

In the late 1980s, Levenson formed a string band called the Boiled Buzzards, which went on to record four albums between 1989 and 1994. The band started out with five players, with the lead performer on fiddle. When the fiddler declined to play onstage, the lead position went to the harmonica player, which gave the band a unique sound. In 2009, Levenson played old time fiddle for the band while his wife Jennifer played the banjo, with Greg Gendall on guitar and Marc Robert on bass. An accomplished clog dancer, Levenson has performed with Cleveland blues guitarist Bob Frank as part of his Hotfoot Duo. After touring with Kim Murley as part of the Blue Rose Duo, Levenson embarked on a solo career. Bluegrass Unlimited described his playing as "melodic, meticulous and uncluttered". As of January 2015, he has released ten recordings.

Levenson has taught music at John C. Campbell Folk School, Mars Hill University, Maryland Banjo Academy, Ozark Folk Center, Banjo Camp North and the Rolland Fiddle Camp. Out of a strong desire to introduce the banjo to absolute beginners, he traveled throughout the United States, England, Ireland, Israel and Brazil leading training workshops known as Meet the Banjo or "Clawcamp". While in the United States, he used a 2003 Airstream trailer to travel around the country, often wintering at an RV park in Yuma, Arizona. Due to his focus on these workshops, he performed only at about twelve concerts per annum. Levenson began writing a column for Banjo Newsletter in January 2005.

== Personal life ==
Levenson is married to Jennifer, his former bandmate in the Boiled Buzzards, who plays the fiddle and banjo. They live in a farmhouse on an 80 acres (32 ha) homestead in the Appalachian region of Ohio, and keep a winter home in Tucson, Arizona.

== Awards and recognition ==
Levenson was voted one of the United States's top ten clawhammer banjo players by Banjo Newsletter readers. He has been called the "Johnny Appleseed of the banjo" by fellow banjoist and writer Ken Perlman in recognition of Levenson's efforts in popularizing banjo playing across the United States and the world. Some awards he has received for his work are:

- 2005 Ohio Clawhammer Banjo Championship, first place
- 2010 Ajo, Arizona Fiddle Contest, Grand Champion
- 2017 Master Artist Award from Arizona's Southwest Folklife Alliance

== Works ==
Levenson has authored numerous books on fiddle and clawhammer-style banjo playing, along with instructional CDs and videos.

- Levenson, Dan (2003). Clawhammer Banjo from Scratch – A Guide for the Claw-less!. Mel Bay Publications. p. 128. ISBN 0786671335.
- Levenson, Dan (2008). Gospel Tunes for Clawhammer Banjo. Mel Bay Publications. p. 48. ISBN 978-0786675760.
- Carlin, Bob; Levenson, Dan (2010). Kyle Creed – Clawhammer Banjo Master. Mel Bay Publications. p. 64. ISBN 978-0786682713.
- Carlin, Bob; Levenson, Dan (2011). Wade Ward – Clawhammer Banjo Master. Mel Bay Publications. p. 64. ISBN 978-0786683666.
- Levenson, Dan (2013). Fiddle from Scratch – An Un-Shuffled Guide for the Bowless!. Mel Bay Publications. p. 120. ISBN 978-0786684823.
- Levenson, Dan (2014). Old-Time Favorites for Clawhammer Banjo. Mel Bay Publications. p. 140. ISBN 978-0786685837.
- Levenson, Dan (2014). Old-Time Favorites for Fiddle and Mandolin. Mel Bay Publications. p. 140. ISBN 978-0786685851.
- Levenson, Dan (2015). Old-Time Festival Tunes for Fiddle and Mandolin. Mel Bay Publications. p. 248. ISBN 978-0786689125.
- Levenson, Dan (2015). Old-Time Festival Tunes for Clawhammer Banjo. Mel Bay Publications. p. 248. ISBN 978-1610658577.
- Levenson, Dan (2015). Fred Cockerham & Tommy Jarrell – Clawhammer Banjo Masters. Mel Bay Publications. p. 56. ISBN 978-0786687770.
- Levenson, Dan (2015). First Lessons – Folk Banjo. Mel Bay Publications. p. 40. ISBN 978-0786692750.
- Levenson, Dan (2015). First Lessons – Clawhammer Banjo. Mel Bay Publications. p. 40. ISBN 978-1619113220.
- Levenson, Dan (2016). Beyond the Waterfall: Extraordinary Tunes for Fiddle and Clawhammer Banjo. Mel Bay Publications. p. 96. ISBN 978-1619115903.
- Levenson, Dan (2020). Buzzard Banjo – Clawhammer Style. Mel Bay Publications. p. 40. ISBN 978-1610657266.
- Levenson, Dan (2021). A Clawhammer Christmas. Mel Bay Publications. p. 36. ISBN 978-1513467627.
- Levenson, Dan (2023). Dan Levenson's Master Collection of Old-Time Tunes. Mel Bay Publications. p. 124. ISBN 978-1513473437.

== Discography ==
- Salt and Grease (with The Boiled Buzzards) (1990)
- Fine Dining (with The Boiled Buzzards) (1991)
- Eat At Joe's (with The Boiled Buzzards) (1992)
- Early Bird Special (with The Boiled Buzzards) (1994)
- New Frontier (with Kim Murley) (1996)
- A Reason To Dance (with Rick Thum & Friends) (1997)
- Barenaked Banjos (2000)
- Light of the Moon (2001)
- Front Porch Waltz And Other Requested Favorites (with Rick Thum & Friends) (2002)
- Traveling Home (2006)
