= Dave Stogner =

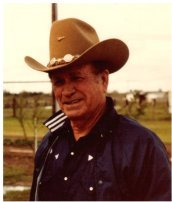

Background information
- Also known as: West Coast King of Western Swing
- Born: David Stout Stogner; May 15, 1920; St. Jo, Texas, U.S.
- Died: May 17, 1989 (aged 69) Fresno, California, U.S.
- Genres: Western swing
- Occupations: Musician, Bandleader, Radio & TV host
- Instruments: Vocals, Guitar, Fiddle, Mandolin
- Years active: 1940s-1980s
- Labels: 4 Star - Decca

David Stout Stogner (May 15, 1920 – May 17, 1989) was an American musician, who was one of the premier Western swing musicians playing on the West Coast. Known as the "West Coast King of Western Swing", Stogner moved to California to pursue a musical career with the encouragement from fellow Texan, Milton Brown.

Although famous for his long-time big band, The Western Rhythmaires, his first band was called The Arkansawyers. Dave Stogner and The Western Rhythmairs hosted a show at the Big Fresno Barn Dance for more than ten years.

At least one author described Stogner's sound as "hard driving hillbilly".

Throughout his long career, in addition to his many hit recordings, Stogner wrote, and co-wrote, several songs including "Hard Top Race" in 1953. Stogner was elected to the Western Swing Hall of Fame in Sacramento in 1988.

== National and regional sponsors ==
During the 1950s, Dave Stogner and his band hosted TV shows in Fresno. His show on the ABC affiliate station was sponsored by Coca-Cola exclusively. During that time Coke sponsored Stogner's show on the west coast and The Eddie Fisher Show on the east coast. Regional sponsors included Stogner's own brand of western style boots, "The Official Dave Stogner Boot".

== Recordings ==
A compilation album of many of Stogner's recordings for Decca and 4 Star are available online.

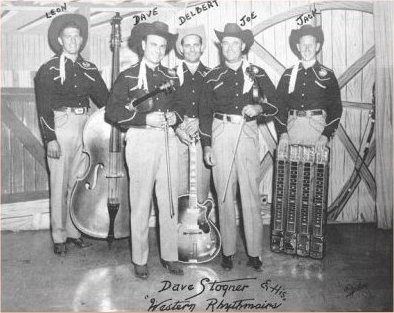

== Bibliography ==
- Ginell, Gary; Roy Lee Brown. Milton Brown and the Founding of Western Swing. University of Illinois Press, 1994. ISBN 0-252-02041-3
- Haslam, Gerald W.; Alexandra R. Haslam; Richard Chon. Workin' Man Blues: Country Music in California. University of California Press, 1999. ISBN 0-520-21800-0
