= Lawrence Reade =

Lawrence Reade can refer to:

- Lawrence Reade (cricketer, born 1846) (1846–1910), New Zealand cricketer
- Lawrence Reade (cricketer, born 1930), New Zealand cricketer

== See also ==
- Lawrence A. Reid, American linguist
- Lawrence Reed, American economist
- Larry Reed (disambiguation)
- Laurie Reid (born 1964), American artist
- Laurie Reed, British middle-distance runner
