= Leon McAuliffe =

American Western swing guitarist (1917–1988)

- Born: William Leon McAuliffe; January 3, 1917; Houston, Texas, U.S.
- Died: August 20, 1988 (aged 71) Tulsa, Oklahoma, U.S.
- Genres: Country, Western swing
- Occupations: Musician, bandleader
- Instruments: Guitar, Steel Guitar
- Years active: 1930s–1980s
- Labels: Columbia, Dot, Capitol, Majestic

William Leon McAuliffe (January 3, 1917 – August 20, 1988) was an American Western swing guitarist who was a member of Bob Wills and His Texas Playboys during the 1930s. He was posthumously inducted into the Rock and Roll Hall of Fame as a member of that band, and was a member of the Steel Guitar Hall of Fame.

== Biography ==
When he was sixteen he was a member of the Light Crust Doughboys, playing both rhythm guitar and steel guitar. In 1935, at age 18, he played with Bob Wills in Tulsa, Oklahoma. He stayed with Wills until World War II.

With Wills, he helped compose "San Antonio Rose". He is more noted, however, for his most famous composition, "Steel Guitar Rag", and his playing, along with that of Robert Lee Dunn (of Milton Brown's Musical Brownies), that popularized the steel guitar in the United States.

His playing (and Dunn's) is also credited with inspiring the rhythm and blues electric guitar style occurring some 20 years later.

After the war, McAuliffe returned to Tulsa and formed a Western swing band named the Cimarron Boys. In 1949, their song "Panhandle Rag" (Columbia) reached No. 6 on the Billboard country chart. McAuliffe recorded through the 1960s. In the 1970s, he participated in a reunion of the Texas Playboys.

In the 1980s, McAuliffe along with Eldon Shamblin and Junior Brown, taught music at Rogers State University in Claremore, Oklahoma.

== Singles ==
Year	Single	US Country
1949	"Panhandle Rag"	6
1955	"Hard-Hearted Gal"	–
1961	"Cozy Inn"	16
1962	"Faded Love"	22
1964	"Shape Up or Ship Out"	35
1964	"I Don't Love Nobody"	47
1971	"Faded Love" (with Tompall & the Glaser Brothers)	22
