= Shoot Low Sheriff =

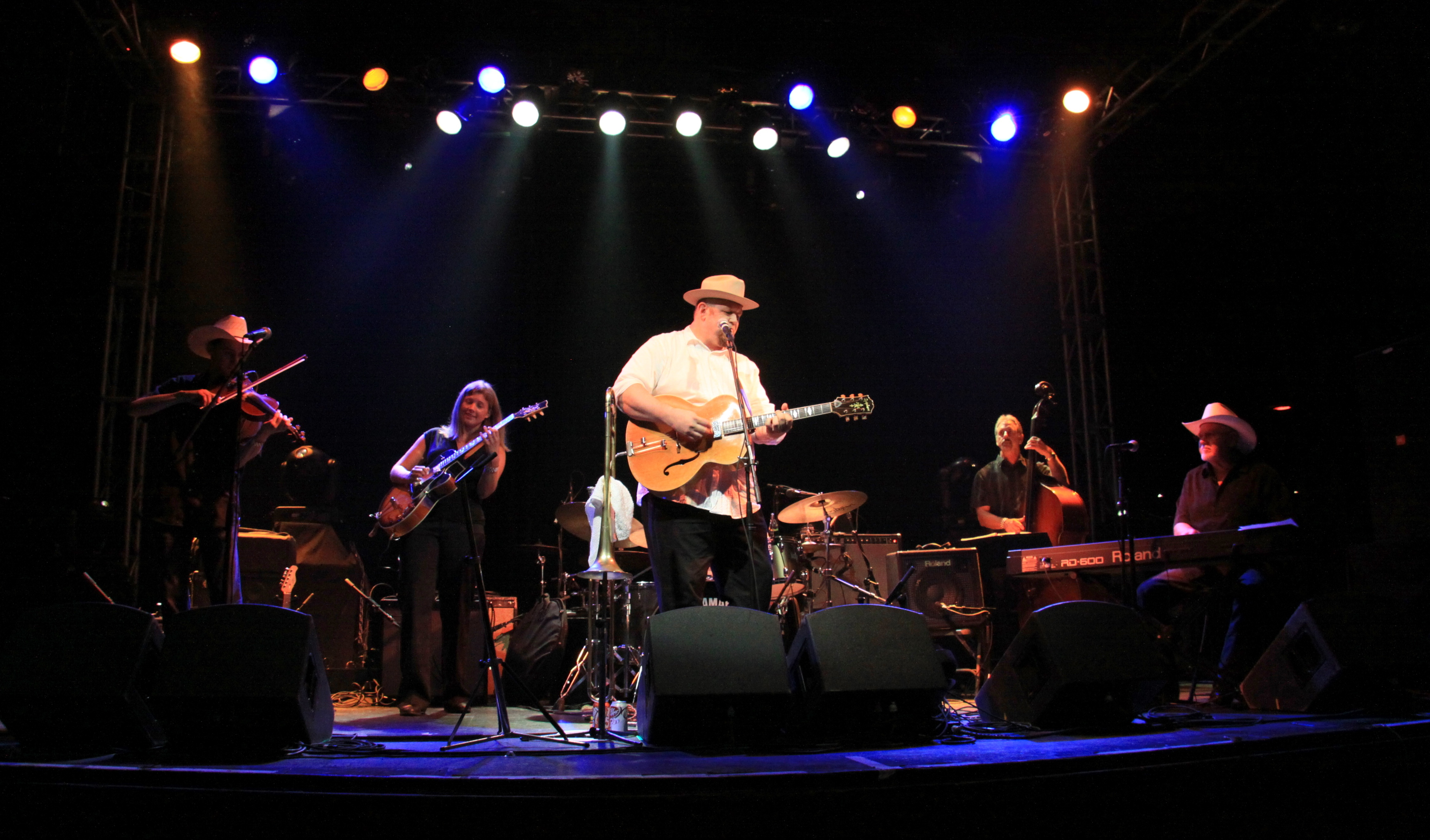
- The Granada Theater, Dallas, Texas

Background information
- Genres: Western swing
- Years active: 2008—present
- Members: Erik Swanson; Wayne Glasson; Brandon Lusk; Dustin Ballard; Jessica Munn; Larry Reed; Geoff Vinton

Shoot Low Sheriff is a Western swing band based in Dallas, Texas. Formed in 2008, the 7-piece group consists of vocalist Erik Swanson (formerly of Cowboys & Indians and the Texas Gypsies), Brandon Lusk (trumpet), Dustin Ballard (fiddle/electric mandolin), Jessica Munn (guitar), Larry Reed (bass), Geoff Vinton (drums), and Wayne Glasson, current pianist for the Texas Playboys and Red Steagall.

The band is heavily influenced by western swing pioneers Bob Wills and Milton Brown, and play a combination of swing standards and original compositions, as well as New Orleans jazz, ragtime and jump blues.

In 2009, their song "Old Alton Rag" was featured in a television commercial for Jack Daniel's and in 2012, the band was named "Western Swing Group of the Year" by the Academy of Western Artists.

In 2012, they performed at the State Fair of Texas.

== Discography ==
- The Mockingbird Sessions (2010)
- Wanted in Texas (2012)
