= Charlie Higgins (fiddler) =

American old time fiddle player

- Also known as: Uncle Charlie
- Born: Charles H. Higgins; February 26, 1878
- Origin: Near Galax, Virginia, U.S.
- Died: November 25, 1967 (aged 89)
- Genre: Old-time
- Instrument: Fiddle
- Years active: circa 1900–early 1960s

Charlie Higgins (February 26, 1878 – November 25, 1967) was an American old time fiddle player from Galax, Virginia. Higgins said that he was influenced by other old-time fiddlers including Emmett Lundy and Fiddlin' Arthur Smith. His style of playing was said to be very innovative and creative. Higgins played regularly with Wade Ward, Dale Poe and other old-time musicians in the Galax area. Recordings of Charlie Higgins are few, and limited to field recordings made between 1959 and 1961 by folklorists Alan Lomax, Peter Hoover and John Cohen. At the time of these recordings Higgins was over eighty years of age, and apparently was not recorded during his prime. However, he was still good enough at age 82 to win first place at the 1960 Galax Old Fiddler's Convention. Higgins died in 1967 and is buried with his wife Mallie at the Coal Creek Community Church in Galax, Virginia.

== Discography ==
Year	Title	Label	Number	Notes
1962	37th Old Time Fiddler's Convention at Union Grove North Carolina	Folkways	FW02434	1961 field recording
1997	Southern Journey. Vol. 2: Ballads and Breakdowns	Rounder	1702	1959 field recordings by Alan Lomax
2001	there is no eye: music for photographs	Smithsonian Folkways	SFW CD 40091	1961 field recordings by John Cohen
2004	Uncle Charlie Higgins, Wade Ward & Dale Poe	Field Recorders' Collective	FRC-501	1959 field recordings by Peter Hoover

== See also ==
- Old-time music
