= KJOK =

- Hollis, Oklahoma; United States
- Broadcast area: Southwestern Oklahoma; Childress, Texas
- Frequency: 102.7 MHz
- Branding: The Big Dog 102.7

Programming
- Format: Classic rock

Ownership
- Owner: High Plains Radio Network, LLC
- Sister stations: KEYB; KYBE

History
- First air date: 2012

Technical information
- Licensing authority: FCC
- Facility ID: 181077
- Class: C2
- ERP: 50,000 watts
- HAAT: 95 meters (312 ft)
- Transmitter coordinates: 34°36′34.2″N 99°50′58.4″W

Links
- Public license information: Public file; LMS
- Website: www.keyb.net

KJOK (102.7 FM) is a radio station licensed to Hollis, Oklahoma. The station broadcasts a classic rock format and is owned by Monte Spearman and Gentry Todd Spearman, through licensee High Plains Radio Network, LLC.
