= KYBE =

- Frederick, Oklahoma; United States
- Broadcast area: Altus, Oklahoma; Vernon, Texas
- Frequency: 95.7 MHz
- Branding: The Coyote

Programming
- Format: Classic country

Ownership
- Owner: Monte Spearman and Gentry Todd Spearman; (High Plains Radio Network, LLC)
- Sister stations: KEYB; KJOK

History
- First air date: August 15, 1982

Technical information
- Licensing authority: FCC
- Facility ID: 67311
- Class: C3
- ERP: 25,000 watts
- HAAT: 100 meters (330 ft)
- Transmitter coordinates: 34°24′53.3″N 99°14′49.6″W

Links
- Public license information: Public file; LMS
- Website: coyotenews.com

KYBE (95.7 FM) is a radio station licensed to Frederick, Oklahoma. The station broadcasts a classic country format and is owned by Monte Spearman and Gentry Todd Spearman, through licensee High Plains Radio Network, LLC. The station began broadcasting on August 15, 1982, and aired a middle of the road (MOR) format.
