= Cecil Brower =

American fiddler and pioneer of Western swing (1914–1965)

- At KECK-AM in Odessa, Texas in 1947

Background information
- Also known as: Cousin Cecil
- Born: Cecil Lee Brower; November 28, 1914; Bellevue, Texas
- Died: November 21, 1965 (aged 50) New York City
- Genres: Western swing, country and Western, jazz
- Occupations: band leader, session musician
- Instruments: fiddle, viola
- Years active: 1931–1965
- Labels: Cumberland, Mercury
- Formerly of: The Southern Melody Boys; Milton Brown and His Musical Brownies; The Light Crust Doughboys; The Kilocycle Cowboys; Jimmy Dean

Cecil Lee Brower (November 28, 1914 – November 21, 1965) was a classically trained American jazz violinist who became an architect of Western swing in the 1930s. Perhaps the greatest swing fiddler, he could improvise as well as double shuffle and created his own style which became the benchmark for his contemporaries.

Brower played in many Western bands, including his own, and was a renowned Nashville session musician. He performed with some of the biggest names in country music until his death at age 50 while a member of Jimmy Dean's band. Brower is a member of the Texas Music Hall of Fame.

== Biography ==
Cecil Brower was born in Bellevue, Texas on November 28, 1914. He moved to San Pedro, California with his family as a boy, but they returned to Texas in 1924, settling in Fort Worth. His father, Hubert, insisted he learn an instrument so he received formal violin lessons from Wylbert Brown, who was also teaching Kenneth Pitts.

Brown later said it gave Brower an edge on other "hillbilly" fiddlers "who had no bowing technique." Brower and Pitts played together locally in the Junior Harmony Club, and both were influenced by jazz and big bands.

In 1931, he joined Pitts to form The Southern Melody Boys with Bob Wren and Burke Reeder, which became the first string band to feature improvised solos, patterned after jazz violinist Joe Venuti, who Brower idolized. He was the first to master the double shuffle, a bowing technique devised by Venuti in the late 1920s described as an off-beat shuffling movement. Brower used it to great effect and passed it along to other Texas fiddlers in the early 1930s. The Southern Melody Boys played popular music and appeared on WBAP-AM and KTAT-AM in Fort Worth.

=== Brownies and Doughboys ===
Brower majored in music at Texas Christian University and played briefly with the Dallas Symphony Orchestra, but his big break came when he became a member of the first true Western swing band, Milton Brown and His Musical Brownies. In January 1933, Brower, playing harmony, joined fiddler Jesse Ashlock to create the first example of harmonizing twin fiddles.

Brower learned the art of breakdown fiddling from Brown's banjoist, Ocie Stockard, and developed a free-swinging style which became the cornerstone of fiddlers in Western swing bands. The twin fiddles often heard in the Brownies' music (setting a pattern that lasted for decades in country music) are those of Brower and Cliff Bruner, a later addition to the band.

The group had a regular spot on KTAT-AM, but frequently performed in Waco, where Brower met Jeff Knight, a breakdown fiddle player with whom he became good friends. Brower married Knight's daughter, Sybil, on March 23, 1937. After Brown's death in 1936, Brower joined the staff of WRR-AM in Dallas, where he worked for $14 a week, and played dances with Roy Newman and His Boys.

In October 1936, Brower recorded with Bill Boyd and His Cowboy Ramblers in San Antonio; and in June 1937 with Bob Dunn.

That same week he made his only recording with Bob Wills and The Texas Playboys. He then toured with bandleader Ted Fio Rito's orchestra until returning to Texas in 1939, when he joined the Light Crust Doughboys. Brower, replacing Buck Buchanan as fiddler in the string section but playing lead (Buchanan had played harmony), was also reunited with Kenneth Pitts. The group enjoyed great popularity, and by the 1940s was heard over 170 radio stations in the South and Southwest.

=== Kilocycle Cowboys ===
After serving from 1942–46 in the US Coast Guard during and briefly after World War II, Brower played with the Hi-Flyers before forming Cecil Brower's Cowboy Band in Fort Worth in 1947, which moved to Odessa in 1948 and became known as Cecil Brower and His Kilocycle Cowboys. The group included Jack Jordan (bass), Buster Ferguson (guitar, vocals), Andy Schroder (steel guitar) and Frank Reneau (piano). The band performed at the Oasis nightclub and recorded at KECK-AM in Odessa.

From 1949–51, Brower played with Leon McAuliffe, then from 1951–52 with Al Dexter and His Troopers. He also performed with Patsy Montana and Her Pardners, and the Coffee Grinders, a later interim name of the Doughboys.

=== 1950s–1960s ===
On Jubilee USA with the Bob Bohm Trio, March 1960

In 1955, Brower became a regular performer on ABC-TV's Ozark Jubilee in Springfield, Missouri for several years, and in 1960, was playing with the Ft. Worth-based Bob Bohm Trio. He soon moved to Nashville, Tennessee and became a much sought-after session musician. He accompanied, among others, Elvis Presley, Patsy Cline (viola), Roy Orbison, Marty Robbins, Loretta Lynn and Brenda Lee; in 1963, former Doughboy John "Knocky" Parker called Brower "one of the finest jazz violinists...[He] is now the leading hillbilly violinist in Nashville."

In the summer of 1961, he appeared on NBC-TV's Five Star Jubilee. In 1962, "Cousin" Cecil Brower And His Square Dance Fiddlers released the album, America's Favorite Square Dances (Mercury MGS 27015, also issued on Smash SRS 67015 and Cumberland green label 29509); and in 1970, Cumberland issued the group's Old Fashion Country Hoedown (Cumberland 29500).

He joined Jimmy Dean's band in 1963 and appeared on ABC-TV's The Jimmy Dean Show. On November 21, 1965, Dean performed at Carnegie Hall, and during a party later at the Waldorf-Astoria Hotel, Brower died suddenly from a perforated ulcer, a week short of his 51st birthday.
