= Bill Livers =

- Born: August 3, 1911
- Died: February 7, 1988 (aged 76)
- Genre: Old-time
- Occupations: Farmer, musician
- Instrument: Fiddle
- Spouse: Hattie Livers

Bill Livers (August 3, 1911 – February 7, 1988) was a fiddle player in Kentucky. He was an African American fiddler who became a local legend for his charismatic character.

== Biography ==
Bill Livers was born on August 3, 1911, and raised in a Black musical community in Monterey, Owen County, Kentucky. Livers worked as a tenant farmer and picked tobacco, but enjoyed performing and playing for the community. Livers learned how to play fiddle from family members and an assortment of local musicians, including his grandfather, Virgil Livers, who was also a fiddler and played with his two sons, Albert and Claude Livers.

Livers was inspired by other musicians, such as Henry Gayle and Clarence Orr, who was a left-handed fiddler. Livers assimilated music from silent piano films, medicine shows, and courthouse gatherings. Livers's love for performing led him to acquire a range of different musical styles, from old fiddle tunes from his family to popular blues and jazz songs. He was known for magnetic stage performances and played with a wide variety of musicians, including younger white players who formed ensembles around him, such as Bill Livers & the Progress Red Hot String Band.

Beyond his musical contributions, Livers was a well-known community figure who hosted social gatherings, such as fish fries, which brought together people from across different racial and cultural lines. Critics described Livers as an entertainer even more than a musician because of his passion for community and outgoing personality. Musicians who worked with him described him as a friend, mentor, and a gifted performer.
