= KEYB =

- Altus, Oklahoma; United States
- Frequency: 107.9 MHz
- Branding: 108 Key FM

Programming
- Format: Country music

Ownership
- Owner: Monte Spearman and Gentry Todd Spearman; (High Plains Radio Network, LLC)
- Sister stations: KYBE; KJOK

History
- First air date: 1991

Technical information
- Licensing authority: FCC
- Facility ID: 1193
- Class: C1
- ERP: 100,000 watts
- HAAT: 147.5 meters (484 ft)
- Transmitter coordinates: 34°46′14.5″N 99°32′18.8″W

Links
- Public license information: Public file; LMS
- Webcast: Listen live
- Website: www.keyb108.net

KEYB (107.9 FM, "108 Key FM") is a country music radio station licensed to Altus, Oklahoma, United States. The station is owned by Monte Spearman and Gentry Todd Spearman, through licensee High Plains Radio Network, LLC.
