= Craig Ball (forensic analyst) =

Forensic analyst

- Education: Rice University; University of Texas School of Law
- Occupation: Computer forensic analyst

Craig D. Ball is an American computer forensic analyst and former trial lawyer who advises judges and lawyers on the use of electronic evidence. He is also an adjunct professor at the University of Texas at Austin School of Law, and is the author of the column Ball in Your Court column of the Law Technology News . He has served as a special master in U.S. court cases involving electronic evidence, and been featured in The New York Times.

== Education and trial career ==
Ball graduated from Rice University and the University of Texas School of Law. He has been licensed to practice law in Texas since 1982 and was board certified in personal injury trial law by the Texas Board of Legal Specialization from 1988 to 2019. He tried lawsuits in Houston for about twenty-five years before joining the law faculty at the University of Texas at Austin and limiting his practice to serving courts as a special master in computer forensics and electronic discovery. He told the ABA Journal that he spent more time in court after this change than he had as a trial lawyer.

== Electronic evidence ==
Ball is a certified computer examiner (CCE) of the International Society of Forensic Computer Examiners and holds certifications in data recovery and as a Nuix certified e-discovery specialist. He is a founder of the Georgetown University Law Center E-Discovery Training Academy, where he serves on the faculty, and teaches electronic evidence and digital discovery at the University of Texas School of Law and digital evidence at Tulane. He served as chairman of the State Bar of Texas Technology Advisory Committee from 2000 to 2002.

He has served as a court-appointed special master or neutral in electronic discovery, or as a testifying expert in computer forensics, in numerous federal and state matters, including In re Seroquel Products Liability Litigation(U.S. District Court, Middle District of Florida), Daimler Trucks North America LLC v. Younessi (District of Oregon) and the Harris County, Texas, matter Arthur v. Stern.

== Writing and honors ==
For nine years Ball wrote the award-winning column "Ball in Your Court" on computer forensics and e-discovery for American Lawyer Media, and he continues to publish a blog of the same name. He is the 2019 recipient of the State Bar of Texas Gene Cavin Award for Lifetime Achievement in Continuing Education.
