= Bus Boyk =

Norval Newton "Bus" Boyk (October 14, 1917 – April 26, 2010) was a noted American fiddler whose career extended from the 1930s to the 1990s and who played in many bands during those eras.

== Biography ==
Boyk was born on October 14, 1917, in Everett, Washington.

In the 1930s he was with the Cascade Hillbillies and the Rancho Serenaders. From 1953-1964 he played with the Sons of the Golden West. Later he toured and recorded with Ray Price. Other groups he played with during his long career were the Yeary Brothers, Roy Jackson and the Northwesterners, Ranch Dressing, Cal Shrum and his Rhythm Rangers, Everything's Jake, and the Fiddle Summit. Although he retired in the 1980s, he won 5th place in the National Oldtime Fiddlers' Contest in Weiser, Idaho, in 1999.

He was entered into the Western Swing Society's Pioneers of Western Swing Hall of Fame and the Oregon Music Hall of Fame.

Boyk died on April 26, 2010, in Redmond, Oregon.
