= Light Crust Doughboys =

American band

The Light Crust Doughboys are an American Western swing band from Texas, United States, organized in 1931 by the Burrus Mill and Elevator Company in Saginaw, Texas. The band achieved its peak popularity in the few years leading up to World War II. In addition to launching Western swing pioneers Bob Wills and Milton Brown, it provided a platform for many of the best musicians of the genre, including Tommy Duncan, Cecil Brower, John Parker, and Kenneth Pitts.

The original group disbanded in 1942, although band member Marvin Montgomery led a new version organized in the 1960s. A contemporary incarnation beginning in the 1990s (including Montgomery until his death in 2001) bills itself as the longest-running country music band in the world.

The Light Crust Doughboys were charter inductees into the Texas Western Swing Hall of Fame in 1989, and were also inducted into the Rockabilly Hall of Fame. In December 2005, the Light Crust Doughboys Hall of Fame and Museum opened in Quitman, Texas. The Light Crust Doughboys Museum was later moved in 2015 to the Auvenshine Library at Hill College in Hillsboro, Texas.

== History ==
=== Original group ===
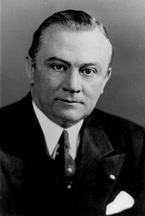
Pappy O'Daniel

In 1931, Burrus Mill's president, W. Lee "Pappy" O'Daniel, wanted to link radio and advertising to promote the company's Light Crust Flour. O'Daniel, who would later travel with the band and use its popularity as a springboard for his political ambitions, said the idea to start the band and link radio to advertising was pitched to him originally by Bob Wills, Herman Arnspiger, and Milton Brown, who at the time were out-of-work musicians. Disagreement exists about exactly when and on what radio station the Doughboys first broadcast, but by January 1931, the band was generally accepted to have started playing on KFJZ-AM in Fort Worth. Their first broadcasts on the station included a sad prison song, "Twenty-One Years", and a popular fiddle song, "Chicken Reel". Their radio signature was their introduction by announcer-engineer Truett Kimzey: "The Light Crust Doughboys are on the air."

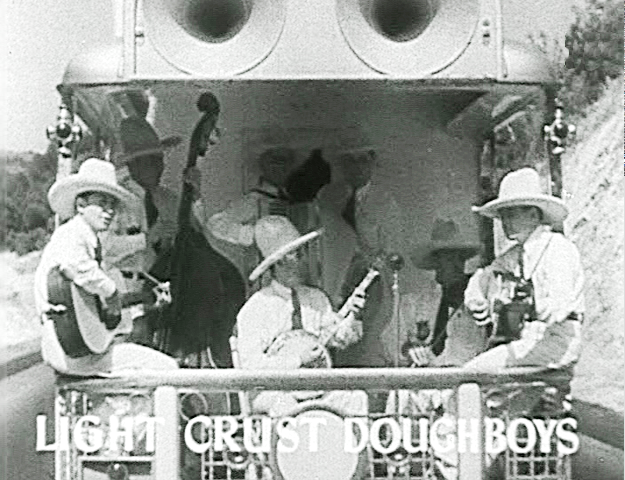
The Light Crust Doughboys in the 1936 Gene Autry film, Oh, Susanna!

Though the Doughboys' early broadcasts were well-received, the notion of using radio to advertise was still new, and O'Daniel was unconvinced. He also reportedly did not like the band's "hillbilly music" and canceled them at least once (though he almost immediately reinstated them). At first, he paid the band members $7.50 a week, but also required that they work a "regular" job at the mill: Wills drove a truck, Arnspiger worked on the dock loading flour, and Brown was a salesman. After a few weeks of brutally long days, the band members were allowed to stop working their "regular" jobs, but O'Daniel required them to be at the mill in their new practice room working on music eight hours each day. The band eventually won O'Daniel over by asking him to serve as their emcee during a broadcast.

The Doughboys began to hit their stride in March 1931, when they chartered a bus to Galveston, Texas, to perform at a bakers' convention. The band had the bus wired for sound and they played impromptu gigs at stops along the way to large crowds. Impressed, O'Daniel purchased a seven-seater Packard and rigged it with placards imploring people to eat more bread. In 1933, during a goodwill tour for the Fort Worth Chamber of Commerce, Truett Kimzey, the radio station's sound engineer, who usually accompanied the band as its "master of ceremonies", could not get away from the station. O'Daniel replaced him, to great effect — O'Daniel was a natural at showmanship and promotion, and the crowds loved him. Wills and Tommy Duncan departed in 1933; and by 1935, O'Daniel had left Burrus Mill to start his own flour company with a new radio band, Pat O'Daniel and His Hillbilly Boys. He was elected Texas governor in 1939.

Their popularity led to a short-lived film career, when they appeared alongside Gene Autry in the 1936 film, Oh, Susanna!.

The original Doughboys group disbanded in 1942 with U.S involvement in World War II, and its final recording was released in 1948.

== Selected discography ==
- Sunbonnet Sue (Victor, 1931)
- Memories Of Jimmie Rodgers (Vocalion, 1934)
- Beautiful Texas (Vocalion, 1934)
- Kelly Waltz (Vocalion, 1934)
- Roll Up The Carpet (Vocalion, 1934)
- My Million Dollar Smile (Vocalion, 1935)
- Prairie Lullaby (Vocalion, 1935)
- My Blue Heaven (Vocalion, 1936)
- The Eyes Of Texas (Vocalion, 1937)
- Beautiful Ohio (Vocalion, 1938)
- It Makes No Difference Now (Vocalion, 1939)
- Blue Eyed Sally (Vocalion, 1939)
- Rainbow (Vocalion, 1940)
- The Cattle Call (Vocalion, 1940)
- Too Late (Okeh, 1941)
- Sweet Sally (Okeh, 1942)
- Rainbow (Columbia, 1948; reissue)

=== Interim years ===
During the following decades, leader Smokey Montgomery kept the band going in some form. In 1969, the Doughboys began recording again, and in 1973, the band took part in the last recording session for Wills in Dallas for the album, For the Last Time. In 1977, Texas State Resolution No. 463 recognized the Doughboys for their contributions to Texas history and Texas music.

=== Current group ===
In 1983, musician and producer Art Greenhaw booked the Doughboys to play at the Mesquite Folk Festival, which he had founded. He became excited about the prospects for reviving the band, which had been working only sporadically for several years. In 1993, Greenhaw joined the group as bassist; as co-producer, he added horns to its sound, bringing about a new type of "country jazz" influenced by the old swing sound. Other members included Jerry Elliott (since 1960), Bill Simmons, John Walden, Jim Baker (since 1993), and Dale Cook. In 1995, the Texas Legislature declared the Doughboys the "official music ambassadors of the Lone Star State"; and they continue to perform today.

The band's collaborations with gospel singer James Blackwood earned Grammy nominations in 1998, 1999, and 2001; in 2005, Southern Meets Soul: An American Gospel Jubilee earned a Grammy nomination for Best Southern, Country or Bluegrass Album.

Their 2005 album, 20th Century Gospel : From Hymns to Blackwood Brothers Tribute to Christian Country, included contributions from Greenhaw, the Jordanaires, and Nokie Edwards. AllMusic commented that it was "A pristinely recorded and expertly played slice of truly American music, 20th Century Gospel is an uplifting work that resonates with the participants' obvious love of making music."

In 2006, in conjunction with the diamond anniversary of the Light Crust Doughboys, America Sejung Corporation was commissioned to produce a limited-edition series of seven fretted musical instruments. In collaboration with Art Greenhaw as technical advisor, these included a banjo, mandolin (with pickup), electric bass, and both hollow and solid-body electric guitars. The models were produced in a customized "Biscuit Brown", with its burst-edge fade resembling an oven-baked biscuit in color.

In 2014, the Doughboys collaborated with Grant Maloy Smith on an album called Roots Gospel Round the USA: From Texas to New York. Smith sang lead vocal on several songs and also contributed a song of his own, "Where Main Street Ends".

In October 2019, the Doughboys announced plans for a worldwide tour to celebrate their forthcoming milestone. The 90th Anniversary Light Crust Doughboys Big Show Band and Review was launched, in conjunction with a four-CD set and double DVD issue.

== Grammy Award listing ==
Year	Album title	Artists	Credit	Grammy Award
1998	Keep Lookin' Up : The Texas Swing Sessions	James Blackwood & The Light Crust Doughboys	Performer	Nominated
1999	They Gave The World A Smile : The Stamps Quartet Tribute Album	James Blackwood Quartet & The Light Crust Doughboys	Performer	Nominated
2001	The Great Gospel Hit Parade : From Memphis To Nashville To Texas	James Blackwood, The Jordanaires, & The Light Crust Doughboys	Performer	Nominated
2002	God is Love : The Gospel Sessions	Ann-Margret, The Jordanaires, The Light Crust Doughboys and James Blackwood	Performer	Nominated
2003	We Called Him Mr. Gospel Music : The James Blackwood Tribute Album	The Jordanaires, Larry Ford and The Light Crust Doughboys	Performer	Won
2004	Always Hear The Harmony : The Gospel Sessions	Engelbert Humperdinck, The Light Crust Doughboys, The Jordanaires, The Blackwood Brothers Quartet	Performer	Nominated
2005	20th Century Gospel : From Hymns to Blackwood Brothers Tribute to Christian Country	The Jordanaires, Art Greenhaw & The Light Crust Doughboys, Nokie Edwards	Performer	Nominated
2006	Southern Meets Soul : An American Gospel Jubilee	The Jordanaires, The Light Crust Doughboys, Nokie Edwards, & Larry "T-Byrd" Gordon	Performer	Nominated

== Publications ==
- The Ultimate All-Day Singing Songbook, Marvin Montgomery & Art Greenhaw, 1999, Mel Bay Publications, Incorporated, CD / Hardback book, ISBN 978-0786650156
- The Light Crust Doughboys Songbook, Marvin "Smokey" Montgomery & Art Greenhaw, 2001, Mel Bay Publications, Incorporated, CD / Hardback book, ISBN 9780786630707
