= Bob Dunn (musician) =

Pioneer Western swing steel guitarist (1908–1971)

- Born: Robert Lee Dunn; February 5, 1908; Braggs, Oklahoma, U.S.
- Died: May 27, 1971 (aged 63) Houston, Texas, U.S.
- Genres: Western swing - Jazz
- Occupation: Musician
- Instruments: Steel guitar, Trombone
- Years active: 1930s-1940s
- Formerly of: Panhandle Cowboys and Indians, Milton Brown and His Musical Brownies, Cliff Bruner's Texas Wanderers, Bill Mounce and the Sons of the South

Robert Lee Dunn (February 5, 1908 – May 27, 1971) was an American Western swing steel guitarist. Influenced by influential Hawaiian lap steel guitar player Sol Hoʻopiʻi, Dunn played in his own original blues-influenced style and was one of the first to record an electric guitar, preceding other country music guitarists following him shortly. He preceded by over three years George Barnes (with Big Bill Broonzy in 1938), Leonard Ware and, slightly later, Eddie Durham.

On January 27, 1935, Dunn became one of the first musicians to record an electrically amplified instrument as a member of Milton Brown and His Musical Brownies.

Dunn also played steel guitar in numerous other Western swing groups including those of Cliff Bruner and one of Moon Mullican's earlier bands. Dunn also had his own group, The Vagabonds, featuring Mullican and Bruner.

Dunn was inducted into the Steel Guitar Hall of Fame in 1992.

== Bibliography ==
- DeCurtis, Anthony. Present Tense: Rock & Roll and Culture. Duke University Press, 1992) ISBN 0-8223-1265-4
- Ginell, Cary. Milton Brown and the Founding of Western Swing. Urbana, IL: University of Illinois Press, 1994. ISBN 0-252-02041-3
- Oliphant, Dave. "Texas Jazz: 1920-50". The Roots of Texas Music edited by Lawrence Clayton, Joe W. Specht, pp. 37–65. Texas A&M University Press, 2005. ISBN 1-58544-492-8
