= Craig Ball (musician) =

American clarinetist and orchestra leader

Craig Bal
- Occupation: swing clarinet player
- Instrument: clarinet

Craig Ball is an American swing clarinet player and leader of the White Heat Swing Orchestra. He recorded the sound track for the 1990 Warner Brother's film Dick Tracy.

Ball has played in concert with Cab Calloway, Tony Bennett, Joel Grey, and Lou Rawls. His orchestra was named "Boston's Best Dance Band" by Boston Magazine. Norah Jones used to be a regular singer with his band.

Ball's White Heat Swing Orchestra was chosen to play at Governor Deval Patrick's Inaugural Ball on January 6, 2011.
