= Milton Brown =

American band leader, singer and founder of Western swing (1903–1936)

Background information
- Also known as: "Father of Western Swing"
- Born: Milton Brown; September 8, 1903
- Origin: Stephenville, Texas, US
- Died: April 18, 1936 (aged 32) Fort Worth, Texas, US
- Genres: Western swing
- Instrument: Vocals
- Years active: 1930–1936
- Labels: Victor, Bluebird, Decca
- Formerly of: The Light Crust Doughboys, The Musical Brownies

Milton Brown (September 8, 1903 – April 18, 1936) was an American bandleader and vocalist who is considered an early adopter of Western swing music. His band was the first to fuse country music, blues, jazz, and pop together into a unique, distinctly American hybrid, thus giving him the nickname, "Father of Western Swing". The birthplace of Brown's upbeat "hot-jazz hillbilly" string band sound was developed at the Crystal Springs Dance Hall in Fort Worth, Texas, from 1931 to 1936.

Along with Bob Wills, with whom he performed at the beginning of his career, Brown developed the sound and style of Western swing in the early 1930s. For a while, he and his band, the Musical Brownies, were more popular than Bob Wills and his Texas Playboys. Brown's career was cut short in 1936 when he died following a car accident.

== Biography ==
=== Early years ===
Born in Stephenville, Texas, in 1903, Brown moved to Fort Worth, Texas, in 1918. After graduating from Fort Worth's Arlington Heights High School in 1925, he worked as a cigar salesman, but he lost his job when the Great Depression hit in the late '20s.

Brown began his musical career in 1930, when he met Bob Wills and guitarist Herman Arnspiger. They were performing at a local Fort Worth dance and Brown joined the duo on a chorus of "St. Louis Blues". The trio decided to team up to play medicine shows around Texas and Brown landed a regular radio spot on WBAP for the group, where they played a show sponsored by Aladdin Lamp Company, which had the band change its name to the Aladdin Laddies.

=== Light Crust Doughboys ===
In early 1931, the group was hired by the Light Crust Flour Company—which was run by Burrus Mill and Elevator Company—to appear daily on the radio station KFJZ. The company, which was managed by W. Lee O'Daniel (also known as "Pappy" O'Daniel) who hosted the radio shows, had the group rename themselves the Light Crust Doughboys. The Doughboys were an instant success, and soon O'Daniel moved them to another radio station, then syndicated the program statewide.

The Doughboys were playing cowboy songs, jazz, blues, and popular songs—a repertoire so diverse that the band's audience continued to expand. In February 1932, they recorded a single for Victor under the name the Fort Worth Doughboys. The band was playing dance music and wanted to play at dances, but O'Daniel was reluctant to let the group play outside of their radio shows. He also was hesitant to pay them much money, which angered Brown. In September 1932, in need of additional money to support his aging parents, Brown left the band after he had an argument about money with O'Daniel.

=== Musical Brownies ===
After leaving the Light Crust Doughboys, Brown formed the world's first Western swing band in Fort Worth, Texas, the Musical Brownies. The first incarnation of the Brownies featured Brown, guitarist Derwood Brown, bassist Wanna Coffman, Ocie Stockard on tenor banjo, and fiddle player Jesse Ashlock. Shortly afterward, pianist Fred "Papa" Calhoun and fiddle player Cecil Brower (who replaced Ashlock) joined the group. Like the Light Crust Doughboys, the Musical Brownies played a mixture of country, pop, and jazz, but the Brownies had a harder rhythm & blues dance edge than their predecessors.

Almost immediately, Brown and His Musical Brownies were a huge success. The group had a regular spot on the radio station KTAT and drew large crowds to various Texas and Oklahoma dance halls. Their home venue, Crystal Springs Dance Hall in Fort Worth, was sold out nearly every Saturday night from 1933 to 1936. Brown and Wills remained friends.

In April 1934, the band recorded eight songs for Bluebird Records; and then another ten recordings for the label in August. Brown and his talented group of musicians were responsible for numerous innovations, notably in late 1934, the Brownies added the true pioneer of the world's first electrically amplified steel guitar—Bob Dunn. Dunn was a jazz guitarist who first heard electric steel guitar played by a down and out blues performer on the Coney Island Boardwalk—Dunn's innovative steel guitar solo riffs single-handedly created country & western's most recognized solo instrumental sound. His upbeat "Taking Off" instrumental is an example of his inspired solos; a towering inspiration to many Western swing, country and even rock guitarists in the years to follow.

In January 1935, Brown's band signed with Decca records and recorded 36 songs for the label with Brown singing lead vocals on most all of the tracks. Released as singles over the course of 1935, the songs helped establish the band as the most popular Western swing band in the entire southwest United States. In March 1936, Brown and his Musical Brownies travelled to New Orleans to record their second set of sessions for Decca. By this time, fiddler Brower had been replaced by Cliff Bruner. At these sessions, the Brownies cut about 50 songs, which were issued throughout 1936 and 1937.

== Death ==
On the morning of April 13, 1936, Brown suffered a car accident, which may have been attributed to his habitual falling asleep at inopportune times, possibly narcolepsy. Although he survived the impact and was expected to recover, he died five days later from pneumonia. Brown's single-car accident occurred on Fort Worth's Jacksboro Highway after the car he was driving hit a telephone pole. A 16-year-old girl, Katy Prehoditch, was killed in the crash. She had slipped away from her house without her parents' knowledge to go to Crystal Springs Dance Hall with friends. Brown had agreed to give the girl a ride home.

Brown was taken to Fort Worth's Methodist Hospital where his injuries were initially believed to not be life-threatening. However, one of his broken ribs had punctured a lung. Pneumonia set in and he died five days later. The site of the crash was in the southbound lane of Jacksboro Highway directly across the street from the "Avalon Motel" which still stands today... and quite eerily, Brown had recorded the song "Avalon" two months prior to his accident.

Following Brown's death, Derwood Brown kept the Musical Brownies together for two years, recording a dozen sides for Decca in 1937.

== Bibliography ==
- Milton Brown & the Founding of Western Swing by Cary Ginell (University of Illinois Press, 1994), ISBN 978-0252020414
