= Western swing =

Subgenre of American country music

- Stylistic origins: Swing; Dixieland; Western; polka; country; blues; old-time; string bands
- Cultural origins: 1920s–1930s, Southwestern United States
- Derivative forms: Neotraditional country

Fusion genres
- Texas swing; rockabilly; rock and roll

Western swing, also known as country jazz, is a subgenre of traditional country music.

The movement was an outgrowth of country music and jazz. The music is an amalgamation of rural, cowboy, polka, early Honky Tonk, old-time, Dixieland jazz, and blues blended with swing; and played by a hot string band of fiddles, mandolin, upright bass, electric and acoustic guitars, banjos, and often augmented with drums, saxophones, trumpets, trombones, pianos, accordion and most notably, the steel guitar. The electrically amplified stringed instruments, especially the steel guitar, give the music a distinctive sound.

Western swing differs in several ways from the music played by the nationally popular horn-driven big swing bands of the same era. In Western bands, even fully orchestrated bands, vocals, and other instruments followed the fiddle's lead, though like popular horn-led bands that arranged and scored their music, most Western bands improvised freely, either by soloists or collectively.

According to country singer Merle Travis, "Western swing is nothing more than a group of talented country boys, unschooled in music, but playing the music they feel, beating a solid two-four rhythm to the harmonies that buzz around their brains. When it escapes in all its musical glory, my friend, you have Western swing."

== History ==
=== Late 1920s to mid-1930s: Beginnings ===
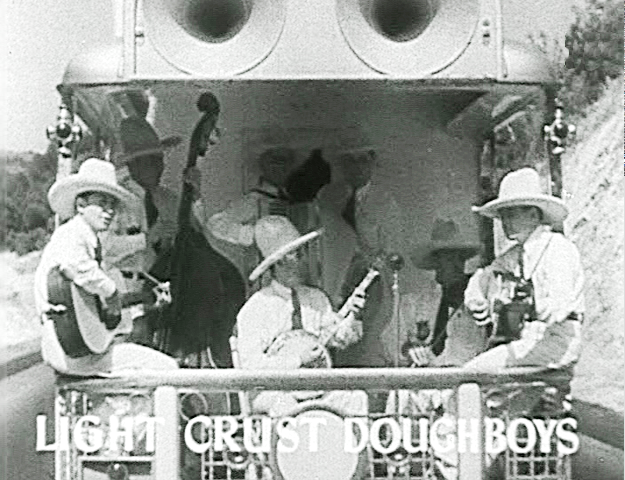
The Light Crust Doughboys in Oh, Susanna!, a 1936 film starring Gene Autry

Western swing began in the dance halls of small towns throughout the lower Great Plains in the late 1920s and early 1930s, growing from house parties and ranch dances where fiddlers and guitarists played for dancers. During its early development, scores of groups from San Antonio to Shreveport to Oklahoma City played different songs with the same basic sound. Prince Albert Hunt's Texas Ramblers out of Terrell in East Texas, and the East Texas Serenaders in Lindale, Texas both added jazz elements to traditional music in the later half of the 1920s through the early 1930s. Fred "Papa" Calhoun played in a band in Decatur, Texas, that played swing music in the style of the Louisiana Five.

In the early 1930s, Bob Wills and Milton Brown co-founded the string band that became the Light Crust Doughboys, the first professional Western swing band. The group, with Fred "Papa" Calhoun on piano, played dance halls and was heard on radio. Photographs of the Light Crust Doughboys taken as early as 1931 show two guitars along with fiddle player Wills, although by 1933 they had three guitarists.

On February 9, 1932, Brown, his brother Derwood, Bob Wills, and C.G. "Sleepy" Johnson were recorded by Victor Records at the Jefferson Hotel in Dallas, Texas under the name The Fort Worth Doughboys. Derwood Brown played guitar and Johnson played tenor guitar. Both "Sunbonnet Sue" and "Nancy Jane" were recorded that day. The group was credited as "Milton Brown and His Musical Brownies".

When Brown left the Doughboys later in 1932, he took his brother to play rhythm guitar in what became The Musical Brownies. In January 1933, fiddler Cecil Brower, playing harmony, joined Jesse Ashlock to create the first example of harmonizing twin fiddles in a Western swing recording. Brower, a classically trained violinist, was the first to master Joe Venuti's double shuffle and his improvisational style was a major contribution to the genre.

In late 1933, Wills organized the Texas Playboys in Waco, Texas. Recording rosters show that beginning in September 1935, Wills utilized two fiddles, two guitars, and Leon McAuliffe playing steel guitar, banjo, drums and other instruments during recording sessions. The amplified stringed instruments, especially the steel guitar, gave the music its distinctive sound. As early as 1934 or 1935 Bob Dunn electrified a Martin O-series acoustic guitar while playing with Milton Brown's Brownies, an idea he may have picked up from a Black guitarist he met while working at Coney Island in New York.

By the mid-1930s, Fort Worth was a hub for Western swing, particularly at the Crystal Springs Dance Pavilion, a country music dance venue that was popular until the 1950s. Bands like Brown and His Musical Brownies played there, interspersing waltzes and ballads with faster songs.

A documented instance of a Western swing group adopting the newer, by then mainstream 4/4 meter swing jazz style, replacing the 2/4 style, was when producer Art Satherley required it at a September 1936 Light Crust Doughboy recording session.

1938 session rosters for Wills recordings show both lead guitar and electric guitar in addition to guitar and steel guitar. The "front line" of Wills' orchestra consisted of either fiddles or guitars after 1944.

Wills recalled the early days of Western swing music in a 1949 interview. Speaking of Milton Brown and himself—working with popular songs done by Jimmie Davis, the Skillet Lickers, Jimmie Rodgers, songs he had learned from his father and others—Wills said, "We'd...pull these tunes down an set 'em in a dance category. ...They wouldn't be a runaway...and just lay a real beat behind it an' the people would began to really like it. ...It was nobody intended to start anything in the world. We was just tryin' to find enough tunes to keep 'em dancin' to not have to repeat so much."

=== Late 1930s to mid-1940s: Height of popularity ===
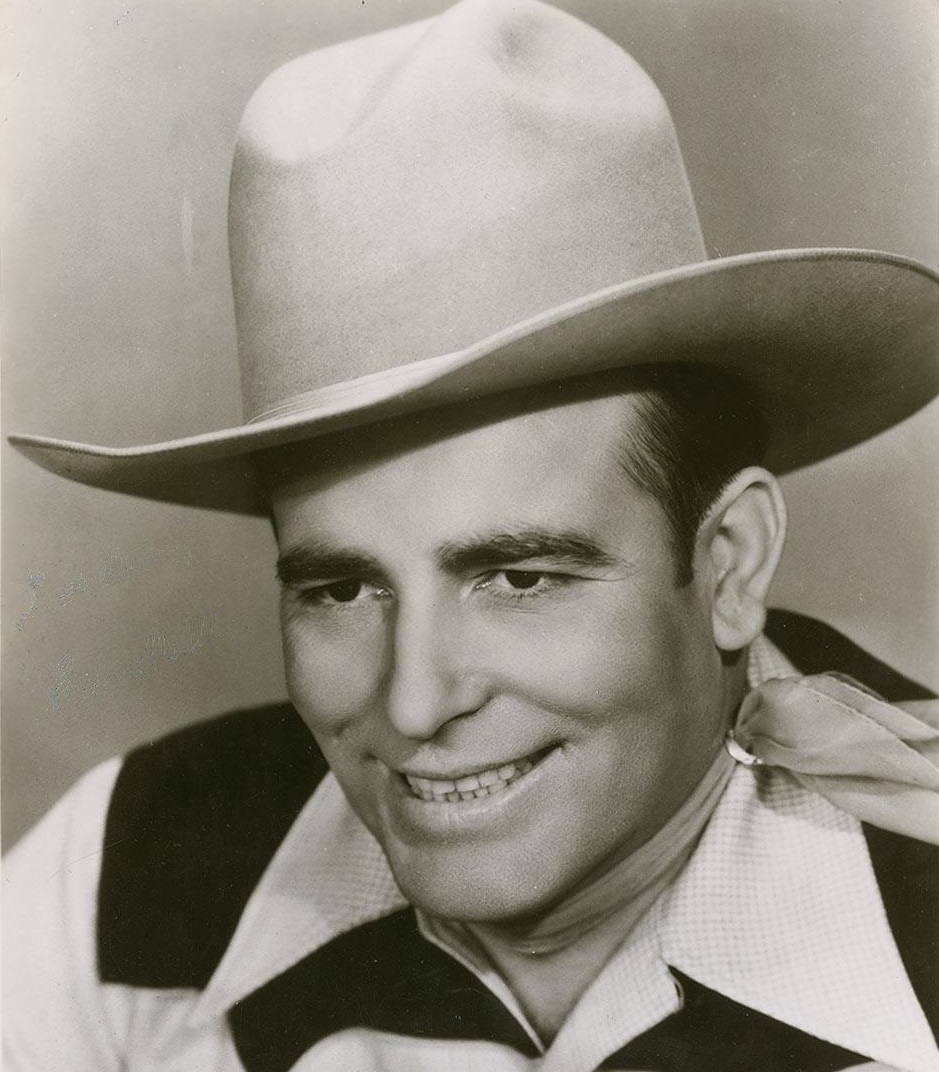
Bob Wills

Western swing was extremely popular throughout the West in the years before World War II and blossomed on the West Coast during the war. Radio broadcasts transmitted live shows to radio stations across the South and the Southwest, reaching millions of listeners. Throughout the 1940s, the Light Crust Doughboys' shows were featured on 170 radio stations in the region. From 1934 to 1943, Bob Wills and the Texas Playboys played nightly at Cain's Ballroom in Tulsa. 50,000-watt radio station KVOO broadcast daily programs. Regular shows continued until 1958 with Johnnie Lee Wills as the bandleader.

Phillips developed a circuit of dance halls and bands to play for them. Among these halls in 1942 were the Los Angeles County Barn Dance at the Venice Pier Ballroom, the Town Hall Ballroom in Compton, the Plantation in Culver City, the Baldwin Park Ballroom, and the Riverside Rancho. These Western dances were a huge success.

One group which played at the Venice Pier Ballroom was led by Jimmy Wakely with Spade Cooley, his successor as bandleader, on fiddle. Several thousand dancers would turn out on Saturday nights. When Bob Wills played the Los Angeles Country Barn Dance at the Venice Pier for three nights shortly before he broke up his band to join the U.S. Army during World War II, the attendance was above 15,000. Fearing the dance floor would collapse, police stopped ticket sales at 11 p.m. The line outside at that time was ten deep and stretched into Venice. Another source states Wills attracted 8,600 fans.

In 1950, Hank Penny and Armand Gautier opened the Palomino in North Hollywood, which became a major venue for country fans in Hollywood. "Western jazz" brought it its initial popularity. Western swing bandleader Hank Thompson, who was stationed in San Pedro during World War II, said it was not uncommon to see "ten thousand people at the pier" at Redondo Beach.

Fred "Poppa" Calhoun, piano player for Milton Brown, vividly remembered how people in Texas and Oklahoma danced when Bob Wills played. "They were pretty simple couples dances, two steps and the Lindy Hop with a few Western twirls added for good measure. By 1937 the jitterbug hit big in the West and allowed much greater freedom of movement. But the jitterbug was different in the West. It wasn't all out boogie woogie; it was 'swingier'—more smooth and subdued."

=== Post-war decline ===
In 1944, with the United States' continuing involvement in World War II, a 30% federal excise tax was levied against night clubs that featured dancing. Although the tax was later reduced to 20%, "No Dancing Allowed" signs went up all over the country. It has been argued that this tax had a significant role in the decline of public dancing as a recreational activity in the United States.

Bob Wills and His Texas Playboys remained popular after the war, and could not provide enough new recordings to fill demand. In 1947 Columbia reissued 70 of their older recordings. In January 1953 Billboard reported Spade Cooley played to 192,000 payees over 52 Saturday night dates at the Santa Monica Ballroom, grossing $220,000.

In 1955, Decca Records, in what Billboard called "an ambitious project", issued seven albums of "country dance music" featuring "swingy arrangements of your customers 'c&w' dance favorites". Milton Brown and His Brownies, Bob Wills and His Texas Playboys, Spade Cooley and His Buckle-Busters, Adolph Hofner and His San Antonians, Tex Williams and His String Band, Grady Martin and His Winging Strings, and Billy Gray and His Western Okies all had their own albums. In November, Billboard reported Decca was rushing out three more albums in the series, albeit with less of a Western swing flavor.

== Origin of the name ==
The genre now called Western swing originated from the dance music of the 1920s–1930s, but lacked a coherent label until after the Second World War. The term swing music, referring to big band dance music, did not come into use until the 1932 Duke Ellington hit "It Don't Mean a Thing (If It Ain't Got That Swing)". Recording companies came up with several names before World War II trying to market the strain that would eventually be known as "Western" swing—hillbilly, old-time music, novelty hot dance, hot string band, and even Texas swing for music coming out of Texas and Louisiana. Most of the big Western dance bandleaders simply referred to themselves as Western bands and their music as Western dance music, many adamantly refusing the hillbilly label.

Bob Wills and others believed the term Western swing was first used for his music while he and his band were still in Tulsa, Oklahoma between 1939 and 1942. The Los Angeles-area Wilmington Press carried ads for an unidentified "Western Swing Orchestra" at a local nightspot in April 1942. That winter, influential LA-area jazz and swing disc jockey Al Jarvis held a radio contest for top popular band leaders. The winner would be named "the King of Swing". When Spade Cooley unexpectedly received the most votes, besting favorites Benny Goodman and Harry James, Jarvis declared Cooley to be the King of Western Swing.

Around 1942, Cooley's promoter, disc jockey "Foreman" Phillips, began using "Western swing" to advertise his client. By 1944, the term had become solidified. On May 6, 1944, Billboard magazine contained the following: "Spade Cooley, who moved in with his Western swing boys several months ago, has released the Breakfast Club." On June 10, 1944, the same magazine wrote: "...what with the trend to Western music in this section, Cooley's Western swing band is a natural." A more widely-known "first use" was an October 1944 Billboard item mentioning a forthcoming songbook by Cooley titled Western Swing. After that, the style became known as Western swing.

== Legacy ==
Western swing influenced honky-tonk, rockabilly, and country rock music, popularizing electrically amplified instruments in country music, along with drums reinforcing a strong backbeat, expanded instrumentation, a heavy backbeat superimposed over a polka or waltz beat, and jazz/blues solo styles.

In 2011, the Texas Legislature adopted a resolution designating Western swing as the official "State Music of Texas".

== See also ==
- Western music
- Swing music
- Western swing fiddle
- List of swing musicians
- Category:Western swing musical groups
- Category:Western swing performers
- Bob Wills
- Spade Cooley
- Texas Country
- Country Swing (dance)

== Bibliography ==
- Boyd, Jean Ann. Jazz of the Southwest: An Oral History of Western Swing. Austin: University of Texas Press, 1998. ISBN 978-0-292-70859-4
- Boyd, Jean A. "Western Swing: Working-Class Southwestern Jazz of the 1930s and 1940s". Perspectives on American Music, 1900-1950 (ch. 7, pp. 193–214), edited by Michael Saffle. Routledge, 2000. ISBN 978-0-8153-2145-3
- Brink, Pamela H. "Western Swing". Encyclopedia of the Great Plains, David J. Wishart (ed.), p. 550. University of Nebraska Press, 2004. ISBN 978-0-8032-4787-1
- Carney, George O. "Country Music". Encyclopedia of the Great Plains, David J. Wishart (ed.), pp. 535–537. University of Nebraska Press, 2004. ISBN 978-0-8032-4787-1
- Coffey, Kevin. Merl Lindsay and his Oklahoma Nite Riders; 1946-1952. (Krazy Kat KKCD 33, 2004) booklet.
- Ginell, Cary. Milton Brown and the Founding of Western Swing. Urbana, IL: University of Illinois Press, 1994. ISBN 978-0-252-02041-4
- Ginell, Cary; Kevin Coffey. Discography of Western Swing and Hot String Bands, 1928-1942. Westport, Conn.: Greenwood Press, 2001. ISBN 978-0-313-31116-1
- Haslan, Gerald W. (1999). Workin' Man Blues – Country Music in California. University of California Press. ISBN 978-0-520-21800-0.
- Kienzle, Rich. Southwest Shuffle: Pioneers of Honky Tonk, Western Swing, and Country Jazz. New York: Routledge, 2003. ISBN 978-0-415-94102-0
- Komorowski, Adam. Spade Cooley: Swingin' The Devil's Dream. (Proper PVCD 127, 2003) booklet.
- Lange, Jeffrey J.Smile When You Call Me a Hillbilly: Country Music's Struggle for Respectability, 1939-1954. ISBN 978-0-8203-2623-8
- Logsdon, Guy. "The Cowboy's Bawdy Music". The Cowboy: Six-Shooters, Songs, and Sex (pp. 127–138) edited by Charles W. Harris and Buck Rainey. University of Oklahoma Press, 2001. ISBN 978-0-8061-1341-8
- Logsdon, Guy. "Folk Songs". Encyclopedia of the Great Plains, David J. Wishart (ed.), pp. 298–299. University of Nebraska Press, 2004. ISBN 978-0-8032-4787-1
- Malone, Bill C.; Judith McCulloh (eds.) Stars of Country Music: Uncle Dave Macon to Johnny Rodriguez. University of Illinois Press, 1975. ISBN 978-0-252-00527-5
- Marble, Manning; John McMillian; Nishani Frazier (eds.). Freedom on My Mind: The Columbia Documentary History of the African American Experience. Columbia University Press, 2003. ISBN 978-0-231-10890-4
- Price, Michael H. "Jazz Guitar and Western Swing". pp. 81–88 The Guitar in Jazz: An Anthology, James Sallis (ed.). University of Nebraska Press, 1996. ISBN 978-0-8032-4250-0
- Saffle, Michael (2000), Perspectives on American Music, 1900-1950, Taylor & Francis, ISBN 978-0-8153-2145-3.
- Townsend, Charles. San Antonio Rose: The Life and Music of Bob wills. University of Illinois Press, 1986. ISBN 978-0-252-01362-1
- Wetlock, E. Clyde; Richard Drake Saunders (eds.). Music and dance in Texas, Oklahoma, and the Southwest. Hollywood, CA: Bureau of Musical Research, 1950.
- Wills, Bob. 1949 interview from Honky Tonks, Hymns and the Blues. Part 2: "Raising the Roof", first broadcast by NPR July–September 2003. Written by Kathie Farnell, Margaret Moos Pick, Steve Rathe.
- Wolff, Kurt; Orla Duane. Country Music: The Rough Guide. Rough Guides, 2000. ISBN 978-1-85828-534-4
- Zolten, Jerry. Western Swingtime Music: A Cool Breeze in the American Desert. Sing Out! The Folk Song Magazine. Volume 23/Number 2, 1974.
