= List of musicians from Nova Scotia =

This is a list of singers, bands, composers, conductors, and other musicians originating from or based in Nova Scotia.

== A ==
- Bucky Adams
- Robert Aitken
- Alert the Medic
- April Wine
- Rich Aucoin

== B ==
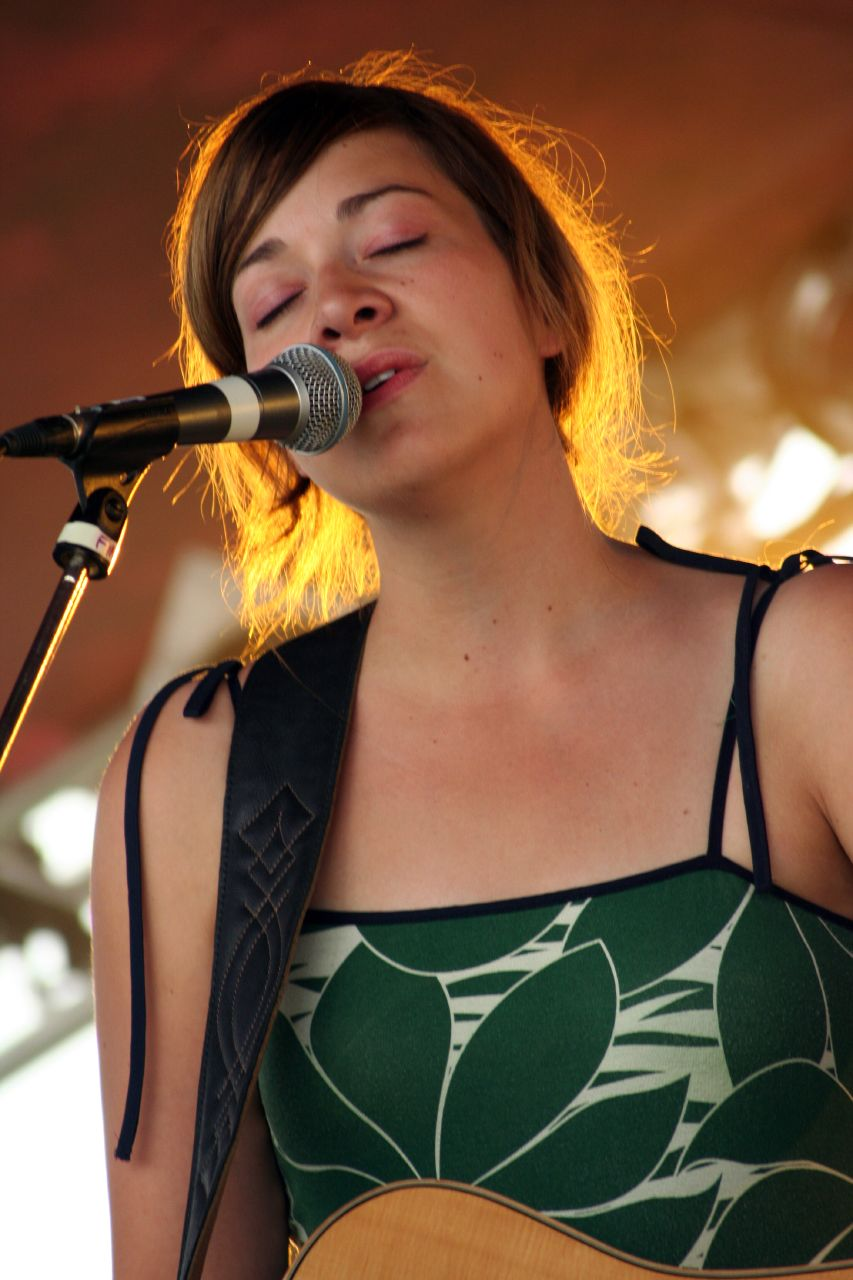
Barber performing in England in 2007

- Carroll Baker
- Adam Baldwin
- Jill Barber
- The Barra MacNeils
- Black Moor
- Blou
- Brian Borcherdt
- Buck 65

== C ==
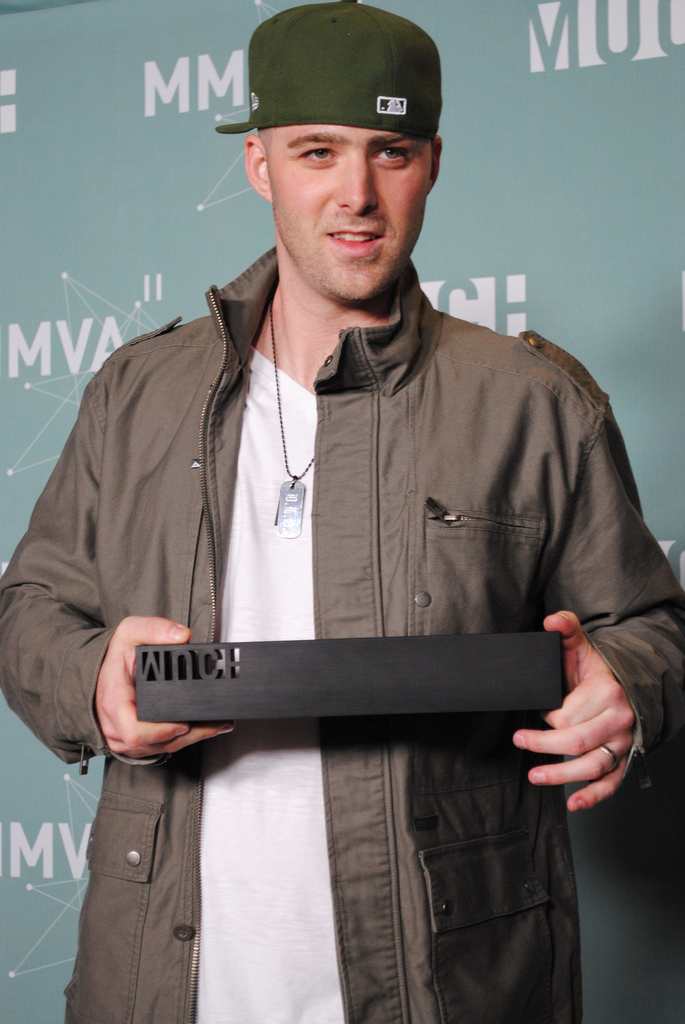
Classified at the 2011 MuchMusic Video Awards
- John Allan Cameron
- George Canyon
- Ben Caplan
- Wilf Carter
- Classified
- Contrived
- J. P. Cormier
- The Cottars
- Rose Cousins
- Brendan Croskerry
- Susan Crowe
- Crush
- Amelia Curran

== D ==
- Jesse Dangerously
- Tanya Davis
- Aselin Debison
- Denise Djokic
- Melanie Doane
- Dog Day
- Denny Doherty
- Luke Doucet
- Morgan Davis

== G ==
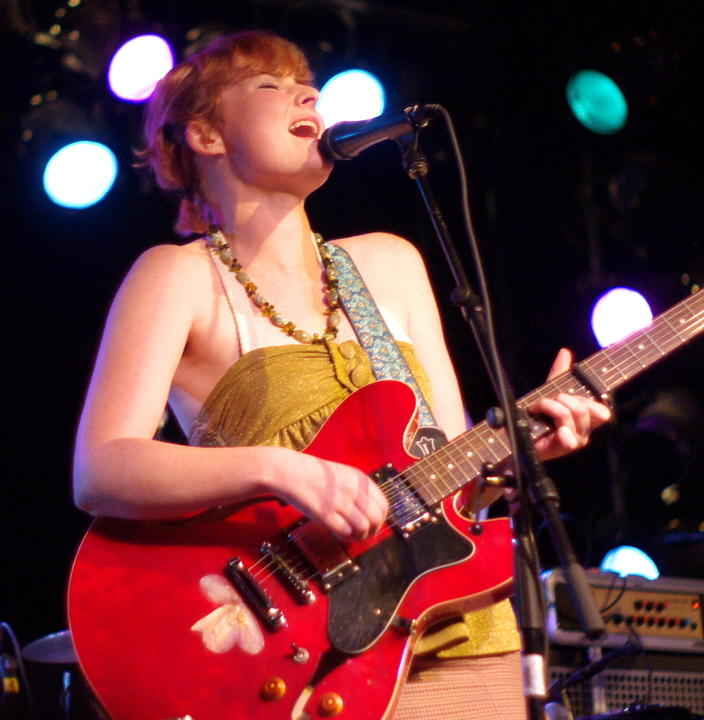
Jenn Grant performing in Ottawa in 2007

- Gloryhound
- Grand Dérangement
- Jenn Grant
- Dave Gunning
- The Guthries
- Gypsophilia

== H ==
- The Halifax III
- Barbara Hannigan
- The Hardship Post
- Heavy Blinkers
- Ryan Hemsworth
- Rebekah Higgs
- Hip Club Groove
- Holy Fuck
- The Hylozoists

== I ==
- In-Flight Safety
- The Inbreds

== J ==
- Jale
- Jah’Mila
- Jellyfishbabies
- Jimmy Swift Band
- JRDN

== K ==
- Mo Kenney

== L ==
- Mary Jane Lamond
- Daniel Ledwell

== M ==
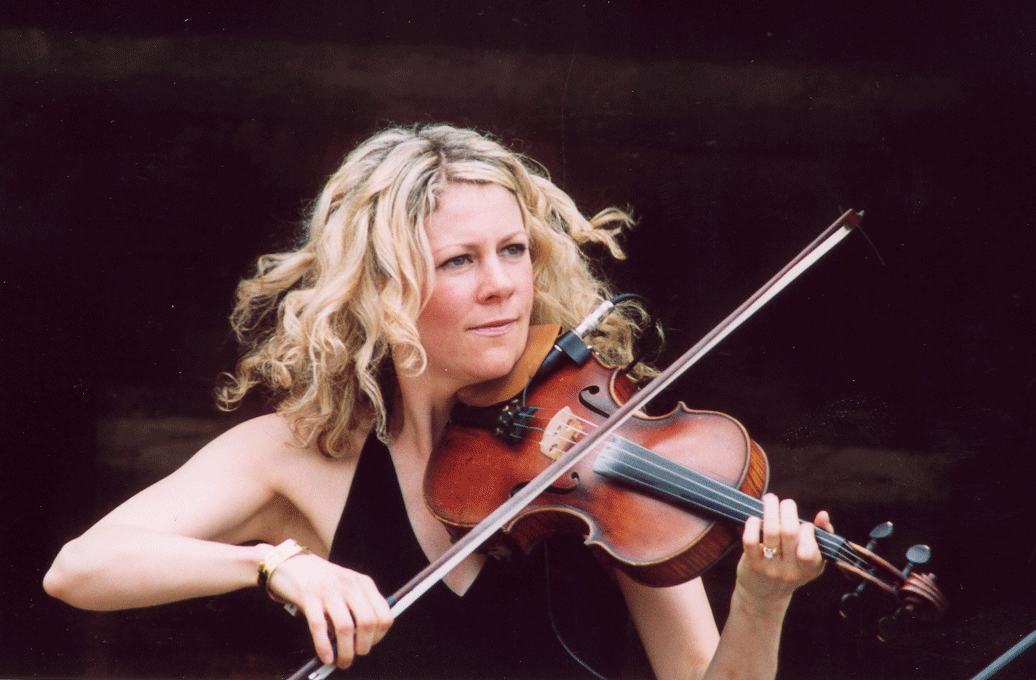
Natalie MacMaster at Merlefest, 2004

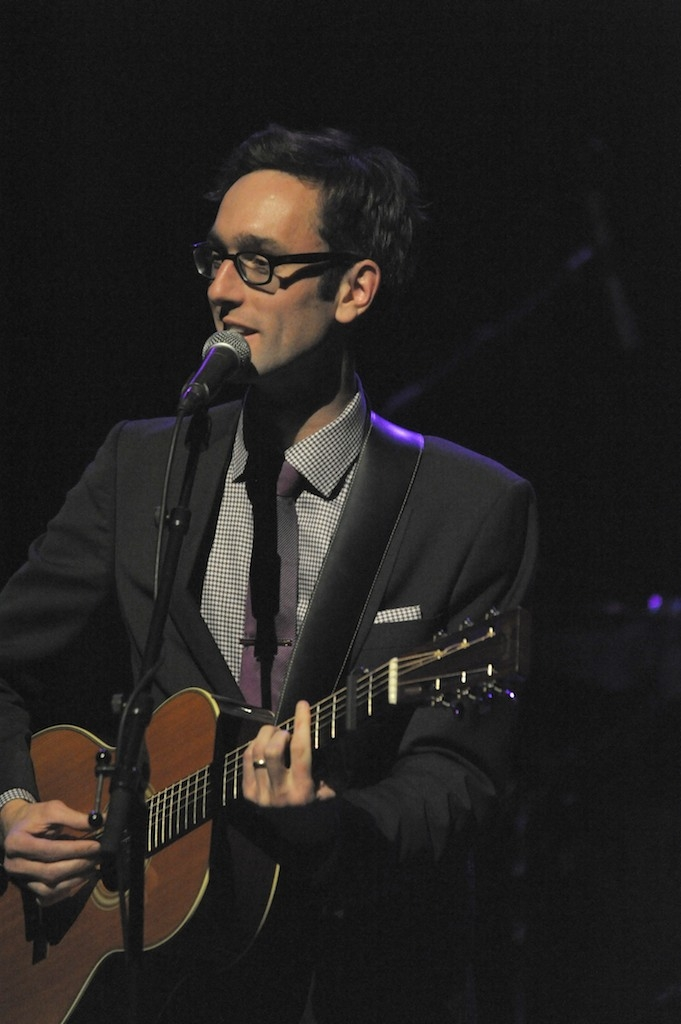
David Myles performing at Brock University in 2011
- Martin MacDonald
- Ryan MacGrath
- Ashley MacIsaac
- Buddy MacMaster
- Natalie MacMaster
- Rita MacNeil
- Ria Mae
- Dutch Mason
- Matt Mays and El Torpedo
- MCJ and Cool G
- Sarah McLachlan
- Eddy (M) Melanson
- The Memories Attack
- The Men of the Deeps
- Matt Minglewood
- Ruth Minnikin
- Mir
- The Motes
- Chris Murphy
- Anne Murray
- Dale Murray
- David Myles

== N ==
- Neon Dreams
- North of America

== O ==
- Old Man Luedecke

== P ==
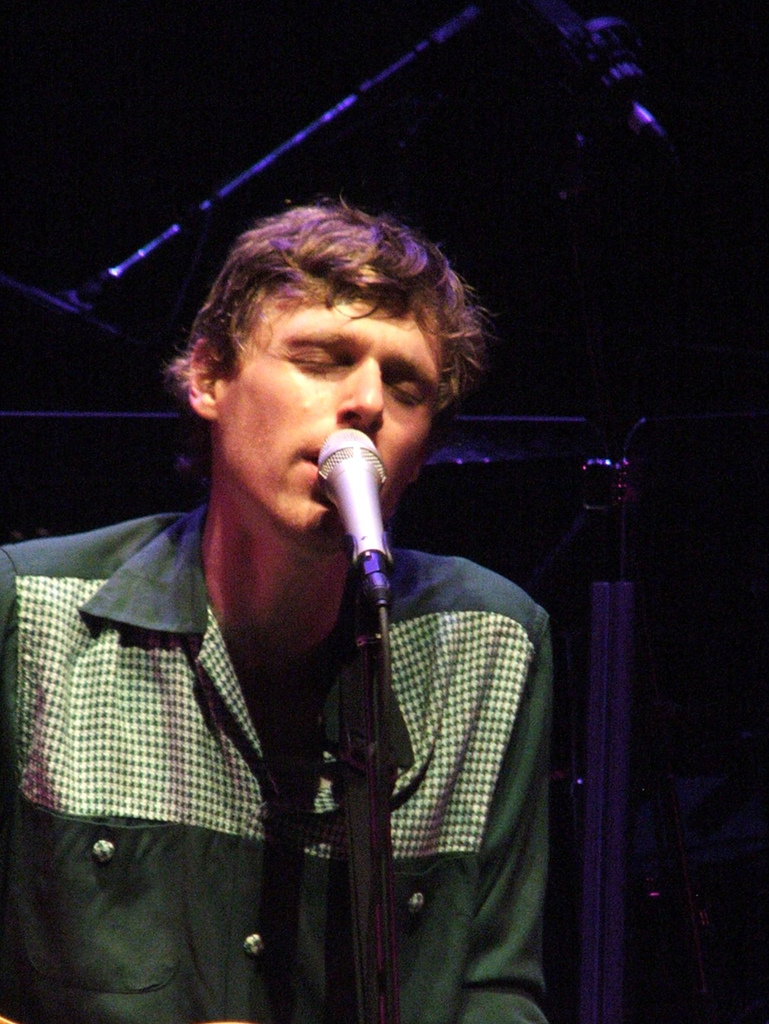
Joel Plaskett performing at the 2007 Ottawa Bluesfest
- Patrick Pentland
- Bill Plaskett
- Joel Plaskett and his band The Emergency
- Plumtree

== R ==
- Radio Radio
- The Rankin Family
- Stan Rogers
- Ruby Jean and the Thoughtful Bees

== S ==
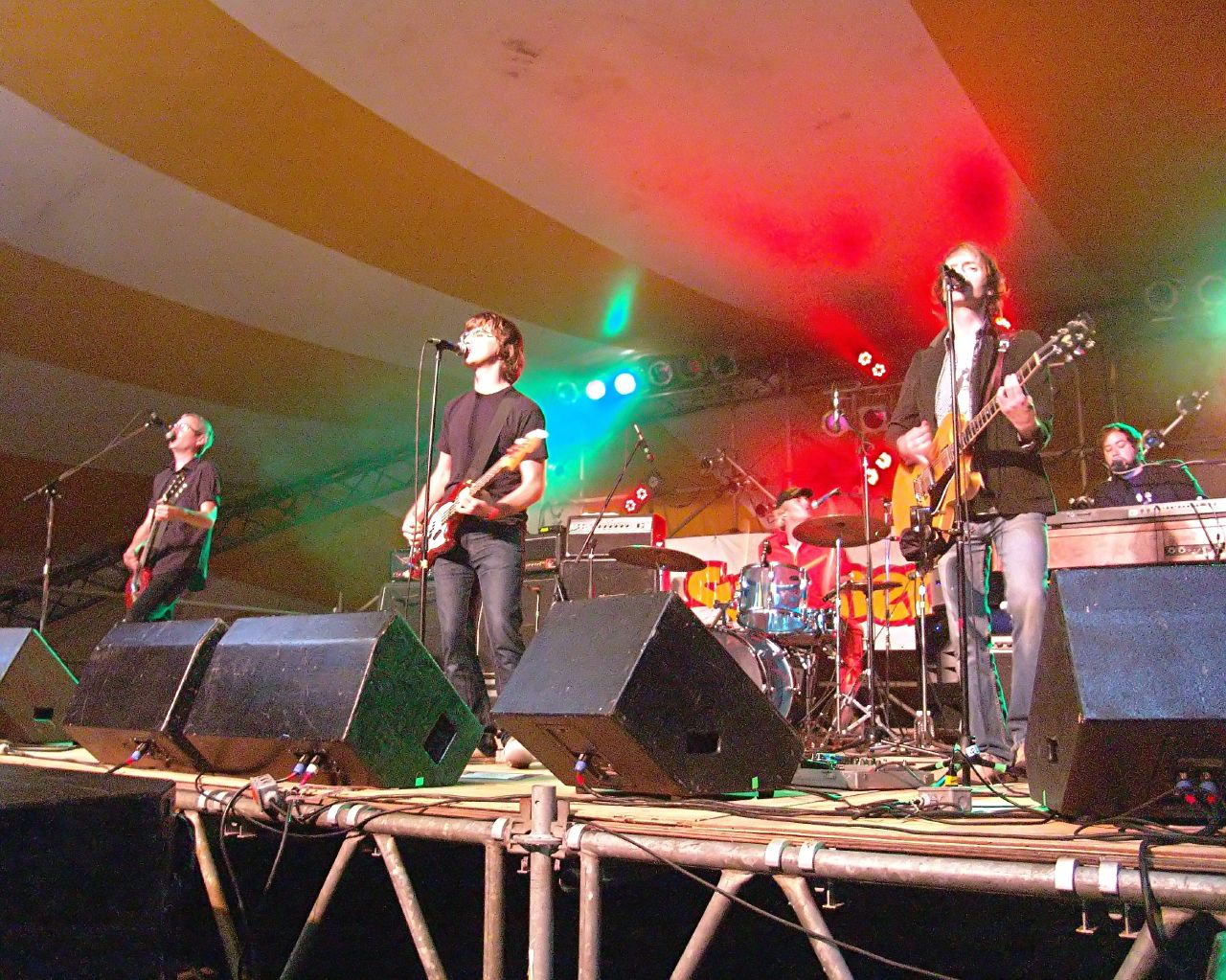
Sloan performing at the Deep River Summerfest 2007

- Gordie Sampson
- Sandbox
- Shyne Factory
- Sixtoo
- Skratch Bastid
- Sloan
- Slowcoaster
- Mike Smith of Sandbox
- Hank Snow
- Sons of Maxwell
- The Stanfields
- The Stolen Minks
- The Super Friendz
- Symphony Nova Scotia

== T ==
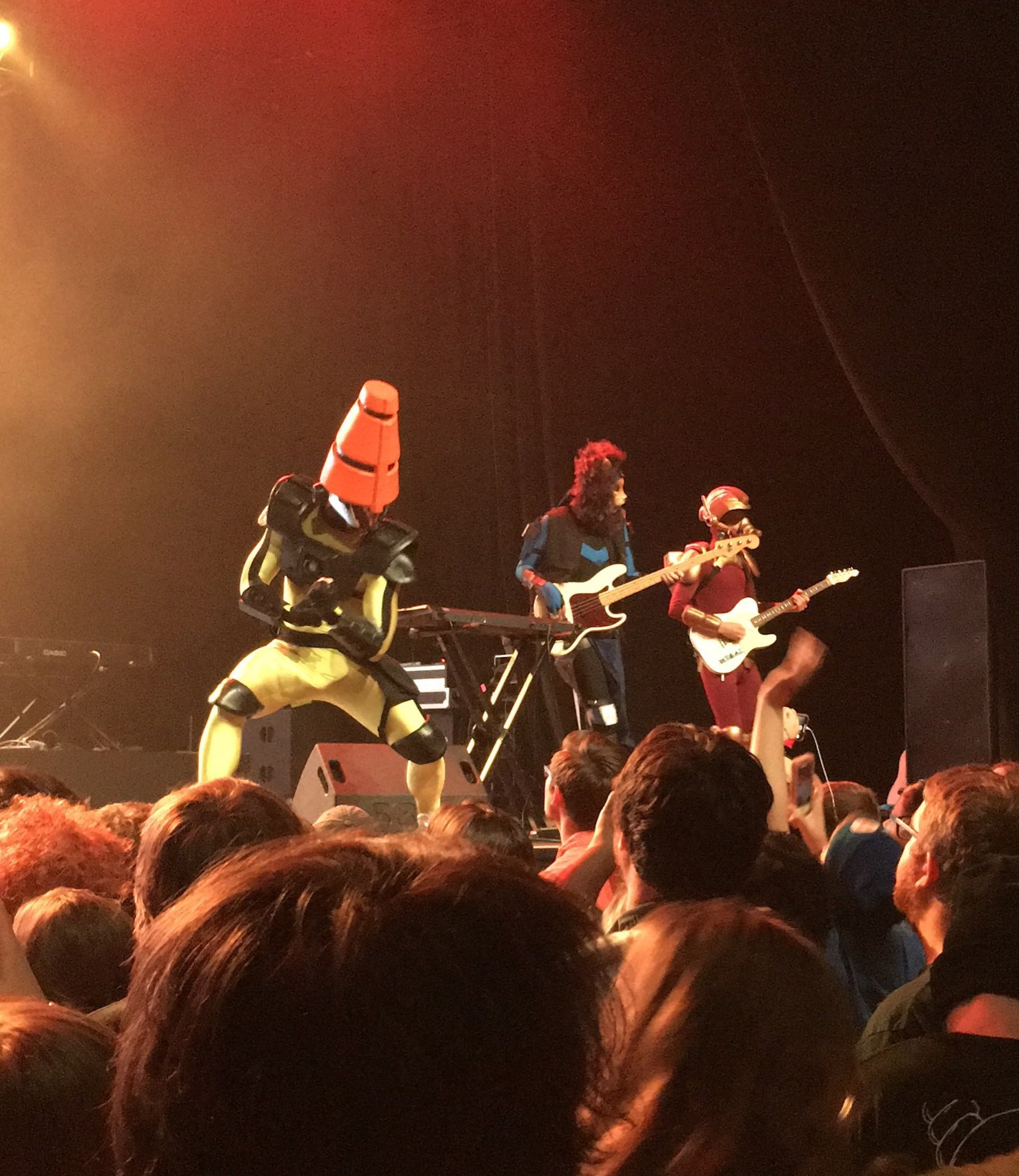
TWRP performing in Dallas in August 2018.
- Tasseomancy
- Thrush Hermit
- Georg Tintner
- Tom Fun Orchestra
- The Trews
- Al Tuck
- TWRP (formerly Tupper Ware Remix Party)

== U ==
- Jody Upshaw

== W ==
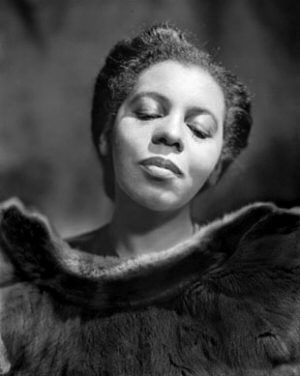
Portia White

- Dinuk Wijeratne
- Wintersleep
- Portia White
- Wordburglar

== See also ==
- Halifax Pop Explosion
- List of musical groups from Halifax, Nova Scotia
- Music of Nova Scotia
- Music of the Maritimes
