= Music of Nova Scotia =

Musical heritage of Nova Scotia

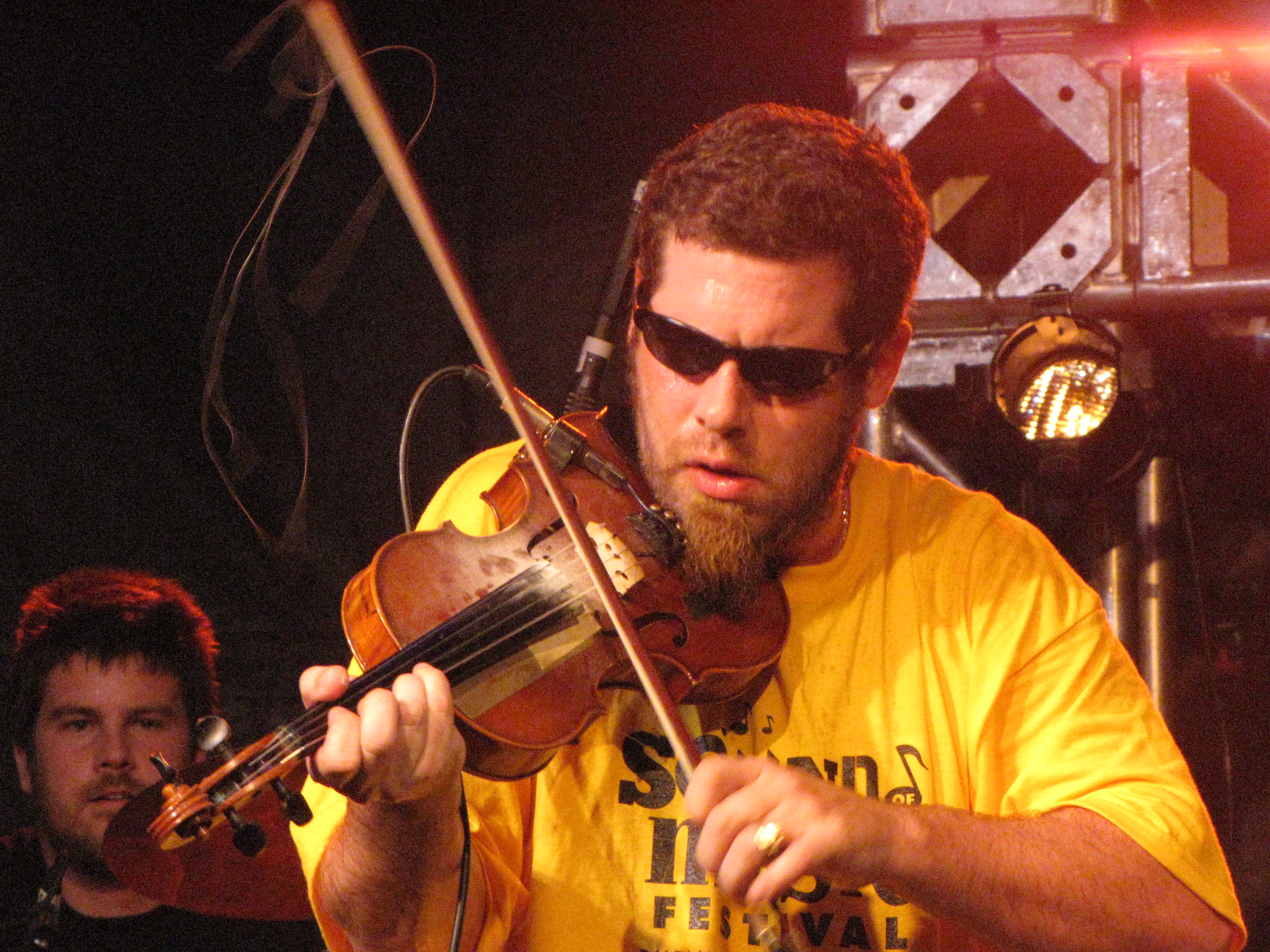
Cape Breton fiddling is a localized form of folk music in Cape Breton

In the province of Nova Scotia in Canada, Celtic music has played a significant role, both in its traditional forms and fused with other musical styles. Nova Scotia's folk music features traditional tunes brought over from the Scottish Highlands in the late 18th and early 19th centuries, as well as localized forms such as Cape Breton fiddle music. In recent years, a wide variety of other musical genres have emerged in Nova Scotia, which has produced several country music stars such as Hank Snow, Wilf Carter, Anne Murray, and Rita MacNeil.

== Settler cultures ==
Nova Scotia is one of three Canadian Maritime provinces, or simply, The Maritimes. When combined with Newfoundland and Labrador, the region is known as the Atlantic Provinces, or Atlantic Canada.

Despite the small population of the province, Nova Scotia's music and culture are influenced by several well-established cultural groups, that are sometimes referred to as the "Founding Cultures."

First populated by the Mi'kmaq First Nation, the first European settlers were the French, who founded Acadia in 1604. Nova Scotia was briefly colonized by Scottish settlers in 1620, though by 1624, the Scottish settlers had been removed by treaty and the area was turned over to the French until the mid-18th century. After the defeat of the French and prior expulsion of the Acadians, settlers of English, Irish, Scottish and African descent began arriving on the shores of Nova Scotia.

Settlement was greatly accelerated by the resettlement of Loyalists (called in Canada United Empire Loyalists) to Nova Scotia during the period following the end of the American Revolutionary War. It was during this time that a large African Nova Scotian community took root, populated by freed slaves and Black Loyalists and their families, who had fought for the Crown in exchange for land. This community later grew when the Royal Navy began intercepting slave ships destined for the United States, and deposited these free slaves on the shores of Nova Scotia.

Later, in the 19th century, the Irish Great Hunger and Scottish Highland Clearances resulted in large influxes of migrants with Celtic cultural roots, which helped to define the dominantly Celtic character of Cape Breton and the north mainland of the province. This Celtic, or Gaelic, culture was so pervasive that at the outset of World War I, reporters from London, England were horrified when some of the first regiments to arrive in England from Canada piped themselves ashore, styled themselves as "Highland Regiments" and spoke Scottish Gaelic as their primary language.

== Traditional music in the contemporary era ==
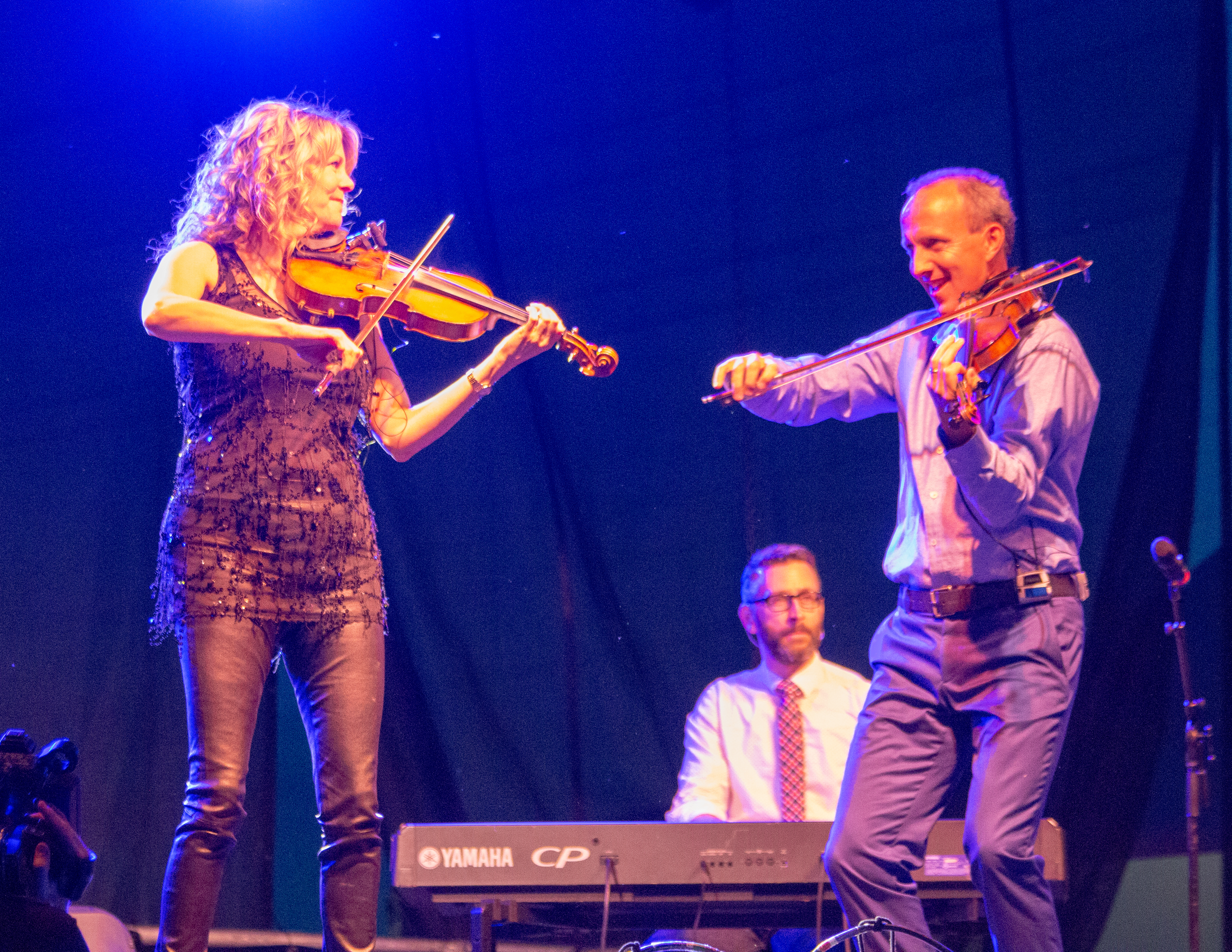
Acclaimed Nova Scotia fiddler Natalie MacMaster (left, performing with Donnell Leahy).

Nova Scotia's traditional music scene is largely influence by Mi'kmaw and settler cultures. Their legacy includes several Juno Awards winners and nominees, along with global staples in the traditional arts. There is also a strong folk music culture, including Stan Rogers, who was born in Ontario to a Nova Scotian family, and sang ballads of seagoing Maritimers, though again little reflecting the area's Scottish traditions. An annual music festival is named in his honour.

=== Scottish Influence ===
Scottish traditional music has remained vibrant throughout the province into the 21st century, most notably in the northern region and Cape Breton, and has produced several performers of international renown. The influence of Scottish culture is woven into the folk music of the province. A prime example of this is Cape Breton's Rita MacNeil, a mainstream singer whose music combined country/folk with the Scottish culture around her, including recording her show Celtic Fantasy.

The province is the heart of two vibrant and popular styles of Celtic music and dance derived from the influence of its Highland Scottish settlement. On Cape Breton Island, the prevalent Scottish culture has influenced the creation of the Cape Breton Celtic style, while on the mainland, "down-east" old time fiddling, popularized by Don Messer, is spread throughout.

With Cape Breton music, the basic duo of fiddle and piano provide a strongly-accented dance music in small-town church and community halls. Sometimes a guitar is augmented, and Highland bagpipe music is also popular. One of the first popular musicians who showed Nova Scotia's Celtic heritage to the mainstream world was John Allan Cameron, a singer and guitarist, and son of legendary fiddler Katie Ann Cameron, who was herself the sister of the music collector Dan Rory MacDonald. Cameron is considered the 'Godfather of Celtic Music', and received an Order of Canada for his accomplishments. Cape Breton has a well-known bagpipe tradition as well, and has produced some well-known pipers, including Angus MacDonald, Barry Shears and Jamie MacInnes.

More recent performers with a Celtic sound in their music include the pop crooning of Sarah McLachlan from Halifax, Mary Jane Lamond and flautist Chris Norman. Mi'kmaw fiddler Morgan Toney, a Juno Awards nominee, often combines Cape Breton Celtic music into traditional Mi'kmaw songs.

With Cape Breton Celtic music, however, it's the fiddle that reigns supreme. A big name in this tradition is Winston "Scotty" Fitzgerald from Cape Breton. Many of his generation including Joe MacLean, Bill Lamey, Buddy MacMaster, Alex Francis MacKay, Dan Joe MacInnes, Angus Chisholm, Dan Hughie MacEachern, Donald Angus Beaton, Theresa MacLellan, Joe Cormier and Paddy LeBlanc also became renowned. Many of these were first distributed outside the American folk label Rounder Records, which began a Cape Breton unit in the early 1970s. The Rankin Family further contributed to bring Cape Breton folk music to mainstream audiences in Canada and abroad. They had performed as a family since childhood, playing traditional music that gradually became more modern as their fame grew.

Perhaps the most well-known modern Cape Breton fiddler is Natalie MacMaster, who comes from a line of musicians that includes Buddy MacMaster, Wendy MacIsaac and Ashley MacIsaac. MacMaster has toured globally and won two Juno Awards. Her cousin, Ashley MacIsaac, is notable for having achieved success playing both traditional music and radical musical fusions, exemplified by his Hi™ How Are You Today? (1995), a landmark recording.

On the mainland, the popular "down-east" style is largely derived from a mix of Scottish and old time music. It was featured in Don Messer's Jubilee, which was the number one most show in Canada outside of Hockey Night in Canada, along with the Singalong Jubilee. The style of fiddling became a common feature for country exhibitions and square dancing. The Maritime Fiddle Festival, which is the longest running fiddle festival in Canada, has helped to keep the traditional music alive and has attracted top old time fiddlers from across North America to its competition. Notable fiddlers include Lee Cremo, J.P. Cormier, and Gordon Stobbe.

=== Irish Influence ===
Irish settlements on the mainland of Nova Scotia further influenced a rise in Irish traditional music Popular especially in Guysborough County and Halifax. The annual Halifax Celtic Festival often includes several Irish musicians, and Irish-themed pubs with live music are common throughout the province.

== Popular music of Nova Scotia ==
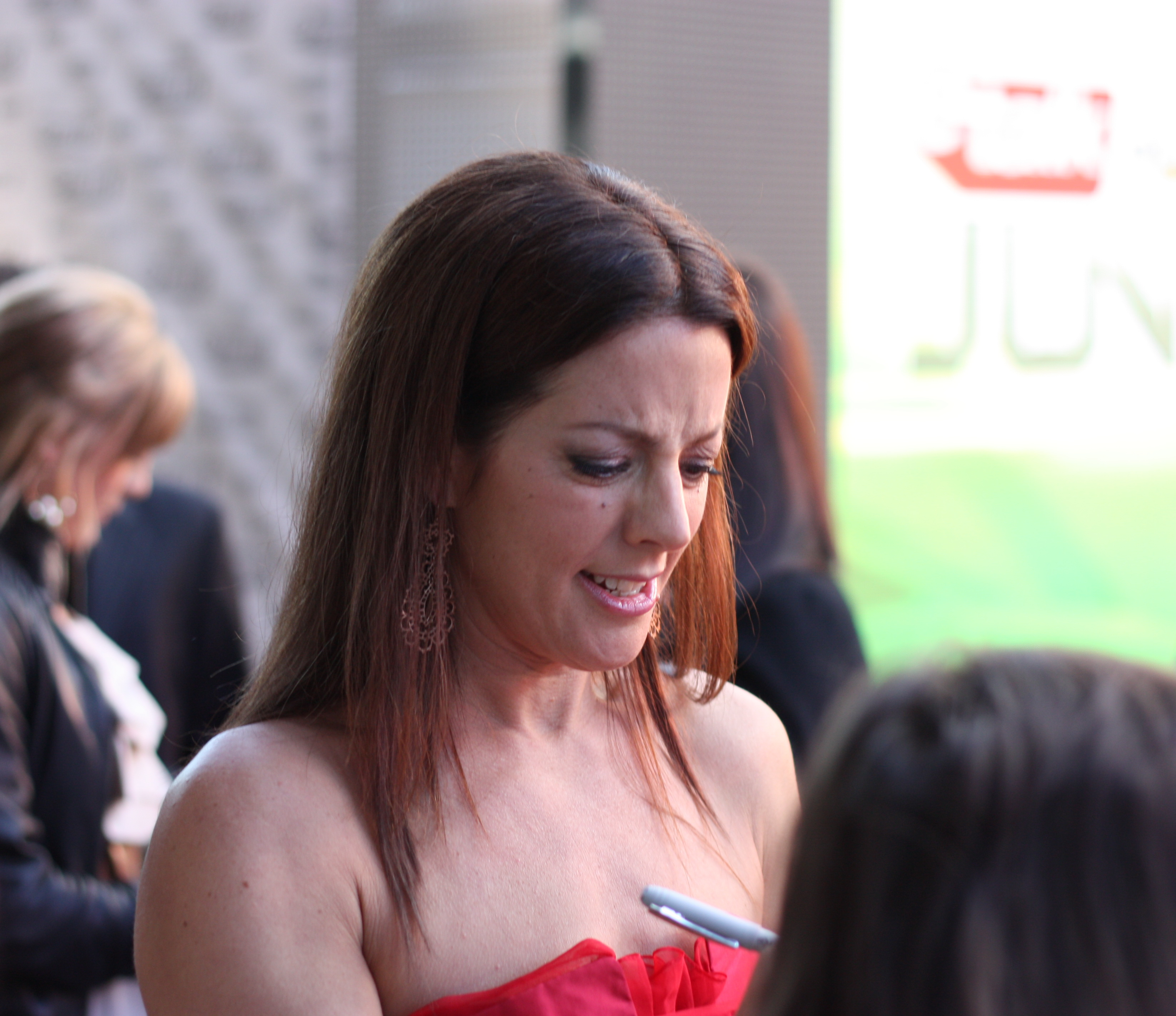
Popular singer and Halifax native Sarah McLachlan

Despite the dominance of traditional based music, both as a form of cultural expression, and as a means to brand the tourism experience for visitors to Nova Scotia, the province also has a long history of producing successful popular music acts. Many notable, internationally known artists are from Nova Scotia, in a wide variety of genres.

=== The early years ===
As early as the 1930s the music of Nova Scotia was entertaining the world. Hank Snow, born and raised in Brooklyn, Queen's County, Nova Scotia, was signed to RCA Records in 1936, but became famous in 1950 when he was invited to appear at the Grand Ole Opry. That was also the year he released "I'm Movin' On," his first massive hit single.

Portia White of Truro, Nova Scotia, one of the greatest contralto voices in the history of Canadian classical music, made her stage debut in 1941. White went on to become an internationally known and respected performer.

An early introduction of the music often referred to as the fifties revolution came from Halifax musician and entertainer Eddy (M) Melanson. Eddy made his debut in 1953 performing for the Halifax Coloured Citizens Improvement League at the Odeon Theatre with a revised upbeat country sound. That sound was later classified by music historian Steve Fruitman as a reincarnation of the Country Jump Blues. Eddy formed his own band in the mid fifties and named it the Rockabillys placing him at the beginning of that genre of music, introducing it in Nova Scotia. When Bill Haley and the Comets toured in the Maritimes in 1958, Eddy and his Rockabillys was selected as the Canadian group to open and close for them. He was inducted into the Rockabilly Hall of Fame (#381) as an original Canadian Rockabilly.

In 1966 The Men of the Deeps, the coal miners of Cape Breton began, and tour all over North America to this day

=== The 1970s and 1980s ===
The pop and country sounds of the 1970s were exemplified by Springhill, Nova Scotia native Anne Murray and her Haligonian producer Brian Ahern. She had a series of top 10 hits worldwide starting with "Snowbird" in 1970, and continues to be a major concert performer. Anne Murray had a #1 Billboard Hot 100 hit with the country pop "You Needed Me" in 1978. Possibly the most famous rock band from the 1970s was progressive rockers April Wine, but other bands such as Pepper Tree, Dutch Mason, Matt Minglewood and the Stan Crawford Band which became the JETZ enjoyed a great degree of national and international success.

As the music scene in Nova Scotia started to coalesce around Halifax and its emerging underground scene, new sounds and new styles of music started to be heard. Both the punk and new wave movements found fertile ground in Halifax, the latter producing a band whose lead singer, Sarah McLachlan, would be snapped up in the 1980s and moved to Vancouver, to later become a huge international star. Sarah McLachlan had 2 #2 albums on the Billboard 200 like the adult contemporary Surfacing in 1997.

It was toward the end of the 1980s that the music scene in Nova Scotia seemed to truly become an industry, with Nova Scotians leading the creation of the East Coast Music Awards as well as establishing the Music Industry Association of Nova Scotia. Performers as diverse as rock band Blackpool, hip hop artists MC G and Cool J, and Celtic pop darlings the Rankin Family all achieved national radio & video play, major label record deals, and national media recognition.

=== 1990s and beyond ===
This was followed by the Halifax music explosion of the 1990s, which saw bands such as Sloan, Eric's Trip, Jale, Thrush Hermit and Newfoundland émigrés The Hardship Post obtain international recognition and recording deals with labels such as DGC and Sub Pop. It was during this time that the internationally known Halifax Pop Explosion music festival was founded (in 1993).

Though the initial excitement generated during this time has abated, Nova Scotia remains at the forefront of the Canadian music wave, with artists who came out of that era, such as Joel Plaskett, and hip hop hero Buck 65 continuing to gain worldwide respect and attention. Other acts such as The Trews, The Stanfields, Matt Mays, and Jimmy Swift Band have all experienced considerable success nationally.

In the past decade, a number of independent record labels, have emerged to support the growth of the indie rock. Dependent Music publishes music by popular acts such as Wintersleep, Brian Borcherdt, Jill Barber, and Holy Fuck. BelowMeMusic promotes the Jimmy Swift Band, Slowcoaster, and Grand Theft Bus.

=== Emergence of hip hop ===
While historically isolated from the Toronto-centric Canadian hip hop scene, Nova Scotia has an increasing number of nationally known acts. In the 1980s, bands such as Down By Law, MC G and Cool J, and Hip Club Groove experienced degrees of national success.

In the 1990s and early 21st century, many artists have achieved national success. Buck 65, from Mount Uniacke, has released several well received records internationally. Sixtoo is signed to and released several records on Montreal label Ninjatune. Universal Soul have seen considerable national exposure since being nominated for two MuchMusic Video Awards in 2003. Classified is an MC and producer nominated for a 2004 CUMA. The Goods, with members Kunga 219 and Gordski, have successfully toured across North America. Kaleb Simmonds achieved a national reputation after a showing in the Top Ten on the second season of Canadian Idol. Scratch Bastid came in second in the 2004 Canadian DMC finals in Winnipeg and won the 2004 Scribble Jam in Cincinnati.

== See also ==
- Acadian folklore
- Cape Breton fiddling
- Halifax Pop Explosion
- List of musicians from Nova Scotia
- Literature of Nova Scotia
