= List of musical groups from Halifax, Nova Scotia =

This is a list of notable musical groups either formed in Halifax or are centered in Halifax, Nova Scotia.

Note: A group must have a Wikipedia article to be included here.

- Alert the Medic
- April Wine
- Aquakultre
- Black Moor
- Contrived
- Crush
- Dog Day
- The Front
- The Guthries
- Gypsophilia
- The Hardship Post
- The Heavy Blinkers
- Hip Club Groove
- Human Missile Crisis
- In-Flight Safety
- The Inbreds
- Jale
- Jellyfishbabies
- Jimmy Swift Band
- Joel Plaskett Emergency
- Mama's Broke
- Matt Mays and El Torpedo
- MCJ and Cool G
- Montgomery Night
- Nap Eyes
- North of America
- Plumtree
- The Raindrops
- Ruby Jean and the Thoughtful Bees
- S.H.A.R.K.
- Sloan
- Sons of Maxwell
- The Stanfields
- The Stolen Minks
- The Super Friendz
- Tasseomancy
- Thrush Hermit
- Tuns
- Tupper Ware Remix Party
- Wintersleep
