= Bill Lamey =

Canadian musician (1914–1991)

William Hugh Lamey (1914–1991) was a renowned and influential Cape Breton fiddler. He was a pioneer in recorded performances of the music. As an avid collector of rare tunes, he amassed one of the most comprehensive and valuable collections of written Scottish violin music.

Lamey was born in River Denys, Inverness County on Cape Breton Island, Nova Scotia on March 9, 1914. His father's people were of Irish descent, arriving in Cape Breton from Ireland around 1800 CE. It was, however, his mother, Margaret (MacLean) Lamey, whose deep love of Scottish music was an early influence on the young Lamey.

== Early career ==
In 1926, the Lamey family moved from rural Inverness County to Sydney Mines. It was here he started playing violin when he was 18 years of age. The music of "Big" Ranald MacLellan and Gordon MacQuarrie, both prominent fiddlers at the time, inspired young Lamey, and he quickly started learning to read music and collect new tunes. He was soon performing in public, and within two years he had his own radio show, with Lila Hashem accompanying on piano, at CJCB in Sydney.

Moving to Sydney in 1936, he started playing for dances in and around the industrial area of Cape Breton, occasionally teaming up with Joe MacLean (another popular fiddler and early recording artist). He played at the first Gaelic Mod at St. Ann's and, 10 years later, won the Premier of Nova Scotia Cup in competition at St. Ann's Gaelic College.

In the 1940s and the early 1950s, Bill became one of the pioneers of recorded performance of Cape Breton fiddling, travelling from Cape Breton to Antigonish, NS, where Bernie MacIsaac had established a recording studio. These recordings were released under the Celtic label.

== Recordings ==
The Celtic Music Interpretive Centre in Judique, Cape Breton, lists the following 78 rpm recordings of Bill Lamey's music in their archives.

Celtic 028 Highland Watch's Farewell to Ireland, Celtic 029 Neil Gow's Lamentation for Dr. Moray/MacKenzie Hay, Celtic 044 Lovat Scouts/Dr. Shaw's Strathspey, Celtic 027 Bog an Lochan, Apex 26350 Lieut Howard Douglas, Apex 26351 The Warlocks/The Shakins O'The Pocky.

A collection of the above-noted recordings was released as a vinyl LP album in 1979, entitled Bill Lamey: Classic Recordings of Scottish Fiddling, Shanachie Records - 14002 - 1979.

A collection of house session recordings was released by Rounder Records in 2000, entitled From Cape Breton to Boston and Back: Classic House Sessions of Traditional Cape Breton Music 1956 – 1977, Rounder Records 82161-7032-2 – 2000 The Sugar Camp

== The Boston States ==
In 1953, Lamey moved with his family to Boston, Massachusetts (for Maritimers, all of New England was known as "The Boston States", but particularly the area in and around Boston itself). A charter member of the Cape Breton Island Gaelic Foundation, he joined the Boston branch in 1953 and was later president of the branch for about 15 years (approximately 1965–1980). He organized dances through the branch and independently, and not only performed on the fiddle himself, but through the years brought in such notable Cape Breton fiddlers as Angus Chisholm, "Little Jack" MacDonald, Alcide Aucoin, Winston "Scotty" Fitzgerald, Joe MacLean, Theresa MacLellan, Donald Angus Beaton, "Buddy" MacMaster, Jerry Holland, Cameron Chisholm, Dan J. Campbell, John Campbell and Mary (Alasdair Raghnaill) MacDonald. Lamey was also instrumental in having many of the above-noted musicians play in house sessions, many of which were preserved on tape (particularly in the home of Herbie MacLeod in Arlington, Massachusetts). Some also played on Lamey's radio show on WVOM. Certainly, Cape Bretoners visiting or moving to the Boston States felt much more at home in a foreign land thanks to the contributions of Bill Lamey.

After a decade of muscle and tendon problems in his shoulders and hands, Bill eventually had to retire from playing violin around 1978. After retiring from his job at the Massachusetts Bay Transit Authority, he and his wife, Sally, left the Boston States and returned to live in Kingsville, Cape Breton (at the same house where his grandfather, Billy Lamey, had lived). In May 1991, Bill Lamey died of complications from Diabetes.

Doug Lamey, Bill's grandson, appears to be following his grandfather's footsteps in becoming an accomplished Cape Breton fiddler.
