= Here Comes John Allan Cameron =

Studio album by John Allan Cameron
- Released: 1969
- Recorded: 1968 RCA Recording Studios, Montreal
- Genre: Celtic, folk
- Label: Apex
- Producer: Marvin Burke

Here Comes John Allan Cameron is the debut album from Canadian singer/songwriter John Allan Cameron. It was recorded at the RCA recording studios in Montreal, Quebec, using the same studio John Lennon used to record Give Peace A Chance. The album is notable as being the first professional multi-track recording by a Cape Breton artist. The album helped launch Cameron's career abroad, leading to performances at the Newport Folk Festival and Mariposa Folk Festival.

== Track listing ==
1. "There Was An Old Woman From Mabou"
2. "The Banks Of Sicily"
3. "Air Fal Al Al O"
4. "Medley - Scots Guards Farewell to South Africa, Macneil of Ugadale, Bonawe Highlanders"
5. "Medley - Mrs Hamilton Of Pencaitland, Jean MacKenzie, The Mabou Jig, Mrs Ronald MacDonald"
6. "The Four Marys"
7. "Medley - Ballindalloch Castle, The Atholl Highlanders, Farewell To The Creeks"
8. "Medley - Fear An Dhuin Mhois, Null Thar Nan Eileanan, Sleepy Maggie"
9. "Medley - Lamentation for James Moray of Abercarney, Dr. MacDonald's Compliments to Mr. James Scott Skinner, Joe MacInnis"
10. "Peggy Gordon"
11. "I Am A Little Beggarman"

== Personnel ==
- John Allan Cameron - Vocals, guitars and step dancing
- Jessie Cameron - Piano and celeste
- John Donald Cameron - Fiddle
- Freddie McKenna - Bass
- Donald Gordon - Gaelic vocals on "Air Fal Al Al O"

== Re-issue ==
The album was re-mastered in 2012 using the original multi-track session tapes, because the original stereo master could not be found. The re-issue includes a 28-page booklet, featuring the original liner notes and artwork, along with additional photos and writings.

- Richard L. Hess - Tape Transfers
- Paul MacDonald - Audio Restoration
- Stuart Cameron, Allie Bennett, Paul MacDonald - Editing
- Jamie Foulds, Soundpark Studios - Mixing and Mastering
- Stephen MacDonald - Project Director
- Stuart Cameron - Executive Producer
- Paul MacDonald - Research and Liner Notes
