= Cape Breton fiddling =

Violin style from Nova Scotia, Canada

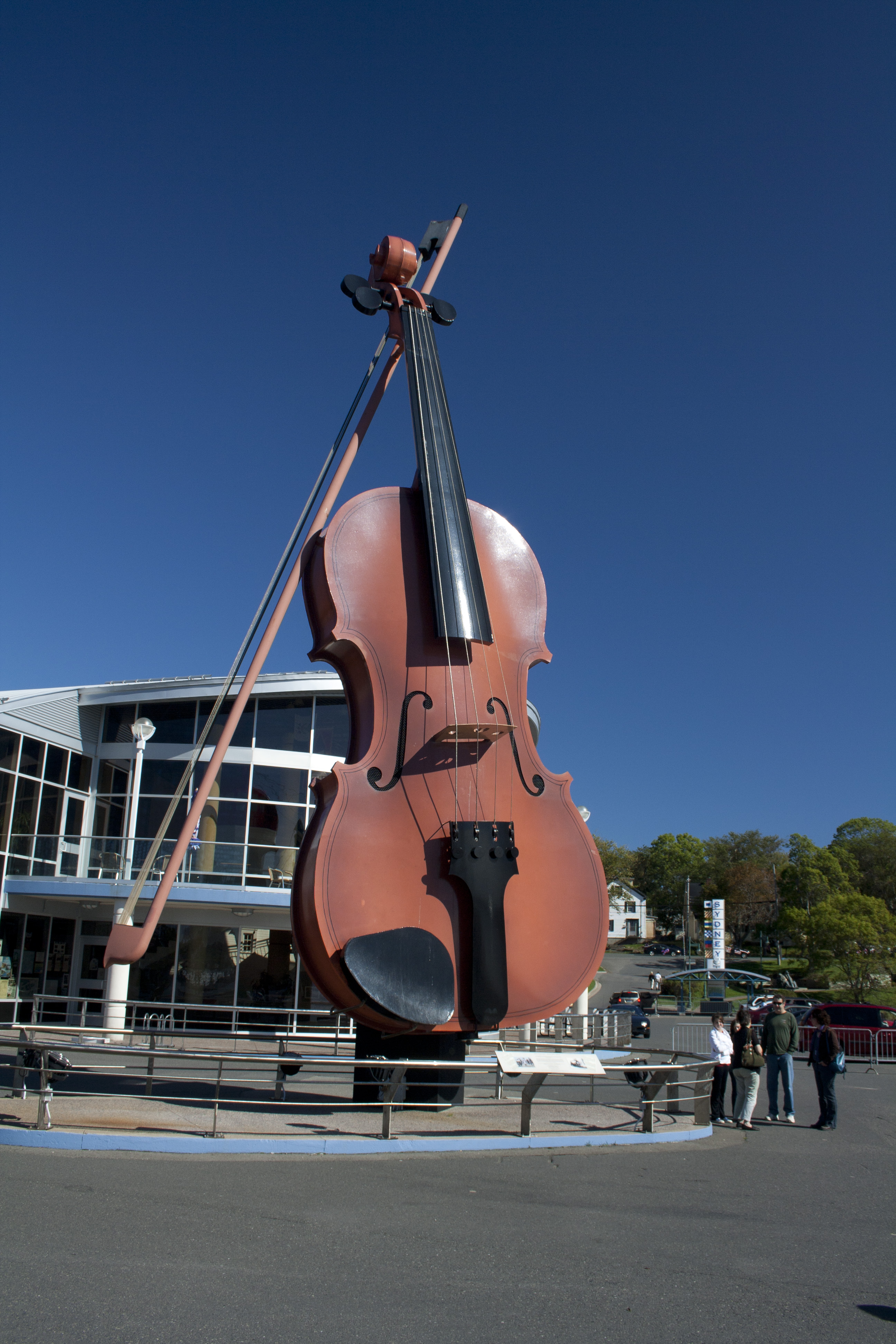
- The World's Largest Fiddle (and bow) on the Sydney waterfront in Cape Breton.
- Etymology: Cape Breton
- Cultural origins: Scottish

Local scenes
- Cape Breton Island

Cape Breton fiddling is a regional violin style which falls within the Celtic music idiom. The more predominant style in Cape Breton Island's fiddle music was brought to North America by Scottish immigrants during the Highland Clearances. These Scottish immigrants were primarily from Gaelic-speaking regions in the Scottish Highlands and the Outer Hebrides. Although fiddling has changed since this time in Scotland, it is widely held that the tradition of Scottish fiddle music has been better preserved in Cape Breton. While there is a similar tradition from the Irish-style fiddling, that style is overlooked as a result of the Scottish presence in the area.

In the span of the 1920s to the 70s, Cape Breton's fiddling style faced decline.

Dance styles associated with the music are Cape Breton step dancing, Cape Breton square dancing (Iona style and Inverness style), and highland dancing.

In 2005, as a tribute to the area's traditional music, the construction of a tourism center and the world's largest fiddle and bow was completed on the waterfront in Sydney, Nova Scotia.

== Playing style ==
Cape Breton- Scottish playing is accented, characterized by driven up-bowing. The tunes of other music origins (Irish, Canadian, French-Canadian, etc.) sound different when performed by Cape Breton- Scottish players. The downbeat pulse is driven by the fiddler's heel into the floor. The pattern tends to be heel-and-toe on reels, the heel on strathspeys.

Cape Breton fiddle music is influenced by the intonations of the Scots-Gaelic language, especially Puirt a Beul (mouth music) and strathspeys. The ornaments are adapted from those used on the Great Highland bagpipe. The ornamentation (cuts aka. trebles, drones and doubling) brings out the feeling of Cape Breton fiddle.

A century ago the violin and pump organ were the common instruments; the latter has been supplanted by piano to provide a rhythmic accompaniment. Guitar is also used for accompaniment but it's less prominent than piano.

== Repertoire ==
The types of tunes commonly associated with Cape Breton - Scottish fiddling are jigs, reels, marches, strathspeys, clogs (hornpipes), and slow airs. Many of the tunes associated with this style fiddle music are also commonly performed on other instruments, especially bagpipes, piano and guitar. It is not unheard of for the music to be performed on harmonica, tin whistle, mandolin or banjo.

Modern Cape Breton players draw on a large body of music, from the Scottish and Irish traditions, and from modern compositions. Several older books of tune collections have been popular sources:

- Fraser, Simon (1874), Simon Fraser Collection
- MacDonald, Keith Norman (1887), The Skye Collection
- MacQuarrie, Gordan F. (1940), The Cape Breton Collection
- O'Neill, Francis (1903), O'Neill's Music Of Ireland
- Robertson, James Stewart (1884), The Athole Collection
- Skinner, James Scott, The Scottish Violinist
- Skinner, James Scott, The Harp and Claymore

A number of recent publications also document a substantial amount of the modern Cape Breton - Scottish repertoire:

- Beaton, Kinnon (2000), The Beaton Collection (compositions of Kinnon, Donald Angus, and Andrea Beaton)
- Cameron, John Donald (2000), The Heather Hill Collection (compositions of Dan R. MacDonald)
- Cameron, John Donald (1994), The Trip To Windsor Collection (compositions of Dan R. MacDonald, volume 2)
- Cranford, Paul (2007), The Cape Breton Fiddlers Collection
- Cranford, Paul (1997), Winston Fitzgerald: A Collection of Fiddle Tunes
- Dunlay, Kate, and David Greenberg (1996), The Dungreen Collection - Traditional Celtic Violin Music of Cape Breton
- Holland, Jerry (1988, several revised editions), Jerry Holland's Collection of Fiddle Tunes
- Holland, Jerry (2000), Jerry Holland: The Second Collection
- MacEachern, Dan Hugh (1975), MacEachern's Collection
- Ruckert, George (2009), John Campbell: A Cape Breton Legacy
- Stubbert, Brenda (1994), Brenda Stubbert's Collection of Fiddle Tunes
- Stubbert, Brenda (2007), Brenda Stubbert: The Second Collection

== See also ==
- Canadian fiddle
- The Barra MacNeils
- Violin musical styles—fiddle
- Music of Nova Scotia
- Music of Canada's Maritimes
- Gaelic College of Celtic Arts and Crafts
- Dan R. MacDonald
- Ashley MacIsaac
- Winston "Scotty" Fitzgerald
