= The Stolen Minks =

Canadian garage punk band

- The Stolen Minks in 2006

Background information
- Origin: Halifax, Nova Scotia; Canada
- Genres: Garage rock, garage punk, indie rock
- Years active: 2003–present
- Labels: Independent, New Romance for Kids
- Members: Erica Butler; Stephanie Johns; Tiina Johns
- Past members: Rachelle Goguen
- Website: thestolenminks.com

The Stolen Minks are a three-piece Canadian garage punk band who have been praised as "Halifax's answer to The Gossip and The Detroit Cobras".

They have shared stages with prominent bands of their genre, including the Black Lips, Wanda Jackson, King Khan & BBQ, Brutal Knights, The Death Set, Statues, and An Albatross. The Stolen Minks have been showcased at a range of festivals including Halifax Pop Explosion, Pop Montreal, Sappyfest, and Ladyfest Ottawa.

The band has toured Canada extensively and in recent years covered large portions of the United States.

== History ==
=== Formation and EP (2003–2005) ===
The Stolen Minks were formed as a four-member all-female band in the fall of 2003 in Halifax, Nova Scotia. The name of the band is a play on the words "minks stole". Drawing influence from artists such as Link Wray and Wanda Jackson, the band was initially recognizable for an energetic rockabilly or rock and roll style, but have evolved since into the garage rock and indie rock scenes. In early years, the band gained popularity playing shows locally in Halifax, and in April 2005 was voted the best new local artist by "The Coast's Best of Music" reader's poll.

The Stolen Minks released their debut self-titled EP in August 2005. The album sold all the original copies produced in a few months.

=== Label signing and Family Boycott (2006–2007) ===
The Stolen Minks were picked up by the Montreal independent label New Romance for Kids before the release of their second recording, Family Boycott. The album first sold on the band's August 2006 tour before being released officially in Halifax in September and nationally in October. Family Boycott was praised as "eight songs of dance floor coups and back alley bruising" (Skyscraper). The album hit number one twice on Earshot in the thirteen weeks in charted.

Halifax animator Ben Jeddrie produced two videos for the band, "Boys on the Floor" in 2006 (from the previous Stolen Minks EP release), and "Stop Talking" in 2007 (from Family Boycott). "Stop Talking" was screened at the Atlantic Film Festival, and both videos received airplay on MuchMusic and MuchLoud.

In 2007, New Romance for Kids re-released the Stolen Minks' sold-out 2005 self-titled E.P. on 7-inch vinyl. The album was distributed by New Romance for Kids in Canada and Morphius Records in the United States.

=== High Kicks and future plans (2008–present) ===
The Stolen Minks' third release, High Kicks, was launched out of New Romance For Kids Montreal in September 2008. Lauded as a "drenched-in-fuzz blend of garage rock meets sassy punk" (Exclaim!), High Kicks was well received in Canada. The album charted for thirteen weeks (with six weeks in the top ten) on Canadian campus and community radio and reached number two on Exclaim!'s monthly Earshot! charts.

In the fall of 2008, the band completed their most extensive tour, covering North America in ten weeks and heading as far south as Austin, Texas. The band's most recent tour took place across North America in June 2009.

The Stolen Minks are featured in the 2008 documentary 6015 Willow along with fellow Halifax bands including Dog Day and North of America.

A video for "Consecutives" (off High Kicks) was recently produced by Halifax visual artist, Paul Hammond of Yo Rodeo.

They released five songs on Bandcamp in March 2010.

== Discography ==
=== The Stolen Minks EP ===
Released August 2005.

1. "Minks Riot" (The Stolen Minks) – 0:49
2. "Black Widow" (Link Wray) – 2:36
3. "Chug a Lug" (Roger Miller) – 1:15
4. "Boys on the Floor" (The Stolen Minks) – 2:10
5. "Peppy Twist" (Joey Dee) – 2:32

=== Family Boycott ===
Released October 14, 2006. All songs were written by The Stolen Minks except as noted.

1. "Rip It Up"
2. "Stop Talking"
3. "Charles Bronson"
4. "Batman (You're the Sex)"
5. "Fight"
6. "Role Model"
7. "Branded" (Link Wray)
8. "Pony (secret track)" (Ginuwine)

=== The Stolen Minks EP – 7" vinyl re-release ===
In 2007, The Stolen Minks EP, originally an independent release, was re-released as a seven-inch by Montreal's New Romance for Kids label.

=== High Kicks ===
Released September, 2008. All songs written by The Stolen Minks.

1. "Bring It"
2. "North End Strangler"
3. "Reflexes"
4. "Drive-in (One)"
5. "Get Wet"
6. "Consecutives"
7. "Your Broken Heart"
8. "Drive-in (Two)"
9. "I Hate You"
10. "Viola Desmond"
11. "Strange Adventures Theme Song" (secret track)
