= The Darkest of Discos =

Studio album by Slowcoaster
- Released: 2010
- Studio: Lakewind Sound; Soundpark Studios
- Genre: Indie rock
- Label: self-released
- Producer: Brian Talbot

Slowcoaster chronology
Future Radio (2007)	The Darkest of Discos (2010)	The Girls Downtown (2013)

Singles from The Darkest of Discos
- 1. "War on War" Released: 2010

The Darkest of Discos is the fifth studio album by Slowcoaster.

== Track list ==
1. "Darkest of Discos"
2. "Fragilest Thing"
3. "B.Y.O. Life"
4. "Is This Stuff Working"
5. "Light Years"
6. "In Front of the Speaker"
7. "Town on the Edge"
8. "Mexican Guitar"
9. "War on War"
10. "Vapor"
11. "Porno"
12. "Fuck Last Night"
13. "Burning Alive"

== Awards ==
Year	Awards	Category	Result	Ref.
2011	ECMA Music Awards	Alternative Recording of the Year	Won	
