= Instruments (band) =

Canadian musical group

INSTRUMENTS
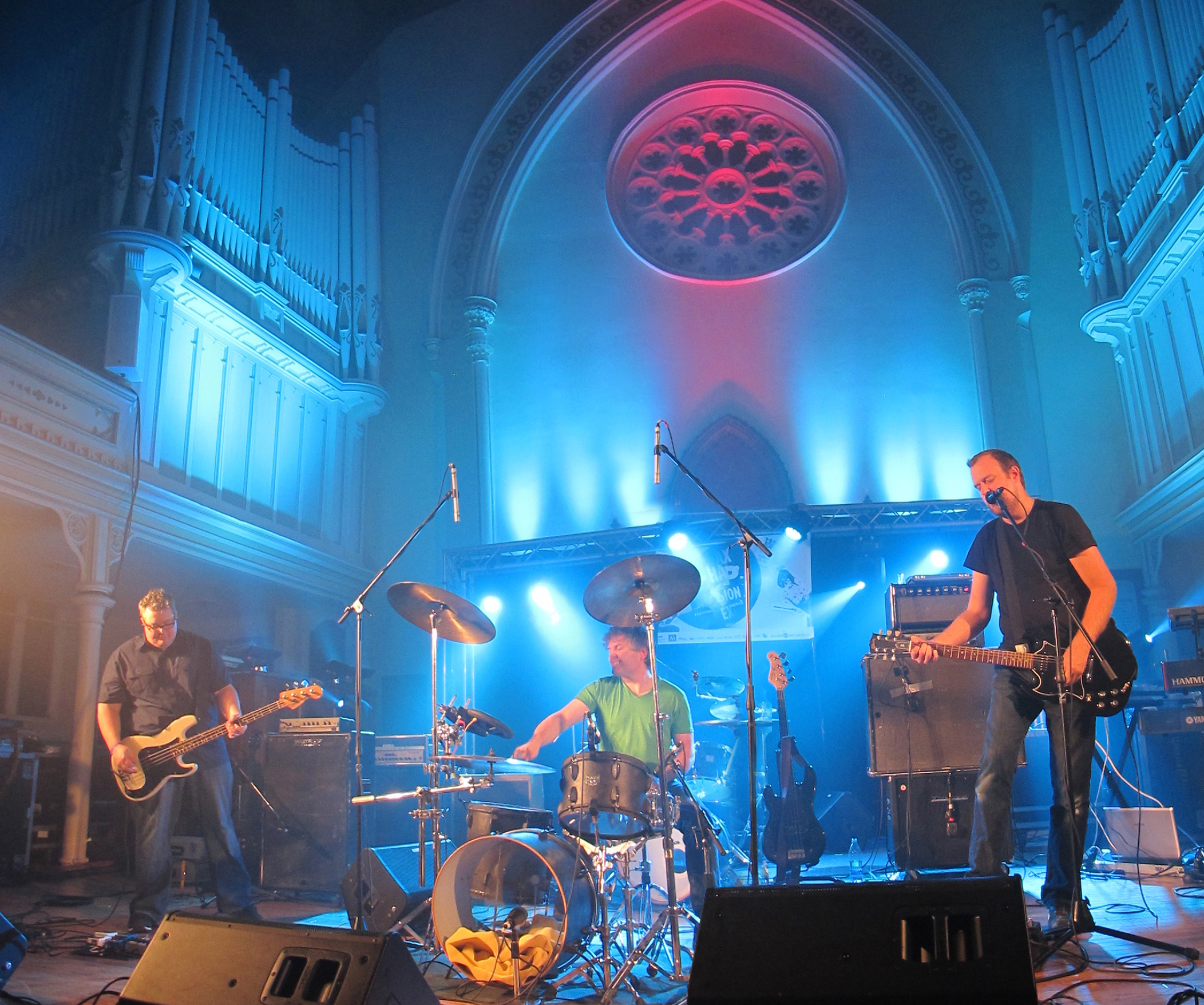
- Live at Halifax Pop Explosion 2012

Background information
- Origin: Halifax, Nova Scotia, Canada
- Genres: Math rock, Post-rock
- Years active: 2001–present
- Labels: Endemik Music, Granma Music
- Members: Jon Hutt; J. LaPointe; Daniel MacDonald

INSTRUMENTS (always spelled with all capital letters by the band) is a three-piece music recording ensemble based in Halifax, Nova Scotia, Canada.

== History ==
J. LaPointe, Jon Hutt, and Daniel MacDonald began playing together in Truro, Nova Scotia, Canada as early as 1991, formally establishing themselves as The Motes (along with Craig Thibault) in 1994. The foursome released six albums before disbanding in 1998. LaPointe spent 1998 to 2001 playing in North of America, touring extensively and releasing four albums, while Hutt spent that time developing his Recyclone project, releasing three albums and collaborating with Sixtoo, Graematter (Buck 65), and LaPointe once again on the Numbers full-length.

LaPointe, Hutt, and MacDonald reconvened as Instruments in 2001. They have since released three full-length albums, two 12" EPs, multiple digital downloads, and collaborated with Triune Gods, American rapper Bleubird, and producer Skyrider on releases on Endemik Music and the Japanese label Granma Music. The band makes rare live appearances including a 2012 performance sharing the stage with Yamantaka // Sonic Titan at the Halifax Pop Explosion, and in January 2014 with Wintersleep.

== Discography ==
- 2005: INSTRUMENTS - Nominal (CD, instrumentslab.com)
- 2008: INSTRUMENTS - Nominal (re-release 12" vinyl w/CD, instrumentslab.com)
- 2009: INSTRUMENTS - National Laboratory (12" vinyl w/CD, Endemik Music)
- 2011: INSTRUMENTS - Assembly Room (CD, Endemik Music)
- 2014: INSTRUMENTS - The End of Light by Heat (CD, Endemik Music)
- 2015: INSTRUMENTS - Spirit Duplicator (Digital Download, instrumentslab.com)

== Also appears on ==
- 2006: SkyRider - 47:34, Hello Loneliness Instruments remix (CD, Granma Music Japan)
- 2006: Chimera - sound and music by Instruments (film)
- 2014: Triune Gods - ≠ Three Cornered World, "3 3 3" (12" and CD - Endemik Music/Granma Music (Japan), Dora (France/Europe)
- 2007: Bleubird - RIP U$A (The Birdfleu), "rip u$a" and "Drunk on Movement" produced by Instruments (CD - Endemik Music/Granma Music Japan, LP - Hectic Records)
