= The John Allan Cameron Show =

Canadian television variety series

- Genre: Variety
- Presented by: John Allan Cameron
- Country of origin: Canada
- Original language: English
- No. of seasons: 2

Production
- Producer: Jack O'Neil
- Running time: 30 minutes

Original release
- Network: CBC Television
- Release: 29 June 1979 – 10 December 1980

The John Allan Cameron Show is a Canadian television variety show produced by CBC Television in Halifax from 1979 to 1980, with repeat episodes airing until 1982.

This was the second national television series featuring host John Allan Cameron. His previous series, John Allan Cameron, was broadcast on private network CTV in 1975 and 1976.

== Regular and guest participants ==
Many of the guests in the series' first season were athletes such as Trevor Berbick, Don Fontana, Tony Gabriel, Nancy Garapick, Brian Heaney, Eddie Shack, Errol Thompson and Debbie Van Kiekebelt.

The second season's non-musical content featured Hollywood-themed segments where Cameron would portray legendary entertainment stars and movie characters. Series regulars Hughie and Allen presented a comic newscast entitled "News From Home".

Musical performances featuring Cameron and his band were staged in Seaton Auditorium at Halifax's Mount Saint Vincent University. Series guests included Bruce Cockburn, Denny Doherty, The Good Brothers, Steve Goodman, Murray McLauchlan, Will Millar (The Irish Rovers), Tom Paxton, Ronnie Prophet, Tom Rush, Sonny Terry with Brownie McGhee, Ian Tyson, Valdy, Roger Whittaker and Mason Williams. Skip Beckwith was the series musical director, who also played bass for Cameron's band, "The Cape Breton Symphony".

== Scheduling ==
The first season in 1979 was a summer series which aired on Fridays at 9 p.m. Eastern time. 1980's second season began in October 1980, running on Wednesdays at 7:30 p.m. until December of that year.

CBC aired brief repeat runs of the series in 1981 and 1982 on Monday evenings at 7:30 p.m.
