= Kingsville, Nova Scotia =

Community in Nova Scotia, Canada

Coordinates: 45°46′54.59″N 61°19′1.56″W

Kingsville in Nova Scotia

Kingsville (Scottish Gaelic: Baile an Rìgh) is a small community in the Canadian province of Nova Scotia, located in Inverness County on Cape Breton Island. Among the early settlers of Kingsville were Alexander McEachern and John McInnes in 1833.

Kingsville had a population of 300 people in 1898, with community infrastructure including a grist mill, a saw mill, and a church. The residents were serviced by three stores. By 1956, the population of Kingsville declined to 50 people.

The McIntyres Mountain quarry is located near Kingsville.
