= Winston Fitzgerald =

Canadian musician (1914–1987)

Winston Scotty Fitzgerald
- Born: Winston Scotty Fitzgerald; February 16, 1914
- Origin: White Point, Victoria County, Nova Scotia, Canada
- Died: September 2, 1987 (aged 73)

Winston "Scotty" Fitzgerald (February 16, 1914 – September 2, 1987) was a Cape Breton fiddler. He was a pioneer in recorded performances of the music, and has heavily influenced the style and repertoire of later generations of players.

== Bio ==
Fitzgerald was born on February 16, 1914, at White Point, Victoria County, Nova Scotia, a remote fishing village on the northeastern tip of Cape Breton Island. His parents were of Irish-French descent. Both his father and older brother, Bob Leonard Fitzgerald, played the violin, and he began to take an interest in playing at age eight. His first public performance was at a picnic at age twelve. The Fitzgerald men worked as fishermen in the summer, and in the 1930s Fitzgerald also worked at the shipyards in Halifax during the winter months. During this time, Fitzgerald played radio shows and toured with Hank Snow for about two and a half years.

Fitzgerald served a stint in the army during World War II, then settled in Sydney after the war. He took a correspondence course from the U.S. School of Music, learning a lot of useful bowing techniques. In 1947, he formed a group called the "Radio Entertainers" with Beattie Wallace (piano) and Estwood Davidson (guitar). The group recorded numerous 78s, as well as four LPs. As he became better known, Fitzgerald also got exposure playing on the "Cliff MacKay" and "Don Messer" shows. Later, he played as part of the Cape Breton Symphony on The John Allan Cameron Show. Never a full-time musician, he worked at a variety of jobs, including cooking, carpentry, and aluminum siding work.

Many of Fitzgerald's recordings are now out of print, but a selection culled from his albums has been reissued as Classic Cuts by Breton Books & Music. A significant portion of his repertoire has been preserved in a book called Winston Fitzgerald: A Collection of Fiddle Tunes, issued by Cranford Publications.
