= The Motes =

Canadian indie rock band

- Origin: Truro, Nova Scotia
- Genres: indie rock, atonal rock
- Years active: 1994–1998, 2019–present
- Labels: Ant Records, Dependent Music
- Members: J. LaPointe; Jon Hutt; Daniel MacDonald; Craig Thibault

The Motes are a Canadian indie rock band from Truro, Nova Scotia, and the founders of a record label called Ant Records. When recording, the Motes were J. LaPointe, and Jon Hutt. When performing live they were the recording duo plus Daniel MacDonald, and Craig Thibault.

== History ==
The Motes began performing locally and releasing music on cassette in 1994. Their first release, on their own label, Ant Records, was Super Useless Powers.

The band performed in Halifax, Nova Scotia, with the band State Champs, and in 1996, the Motes released a 45 rpm split single, "You'll Love the Epcot Palms/The New Physics", with them, through Ant Records. However, the Motes did not tour extensively to promote their releases.

By 1997, the Motes had disbanded; members of the band went on to form a number of other bands in and around Halifax, including North of America, Recyclone, and INSTRUMENTS.

In 2005, a collection of the band's previously recorded tracks was released on Dependent Records, along with five new tracks. In 2018, the band released a collection of alternate versions and outtakes titled Normandy Oddity. The cover art for Normandy Oddity was featured on the Music That Doesn't Suck blog.

Three of the original members of the Motes performed live for the first time in 22 years as part of the Dartmouth Flood music festival in Dartmouth, Nova Scotia, on October 26, 2019.

== Ant Records ==
Ant Records was an independent record label that was started by members of the Motes. The label released mainly cassettes and 7-inch singles. The label was founded in 1993, and continued releasing music until 1999.

== Discography ==
- 1994: The Motes - Super Useless Powers (cassette, Ant Records)
- 1994: The Motes - Secret Air Base (cassette, Ant Records)
- 1995: The Motes - Gesner (cassette, Ant Records)
- 1996: The Motes - The New Physics (split 7-inch w/ State Champs, Ant Records / Daydream Records)
- 1997: The Motes - Trellis I Tripod (cassette, Ant Records)
- 1998: The Motes - The Remains of False Starts (cassette, Ant Records)
- 1999: The Motes - Joe (CD, Ant Records)
- 2005: The Motes - The Remains of False Starts (CD re-release, Dependent Music)
- 2010: The Motes - History Missed (remastered digital re-release of all previous albums with bonus tracks)
- 2018: The Motes - Normandy Oddity (alternate versions and outtakes, 1994–1998)
- 2020: The Motes - Bad Sector (digital)
- 2020: The Motes - Suggestion: Move Quickly (digital re-release)
- 2021: The Motes - Teleport Without Error: Live at Birdland (1995)
- 2021: The Motes - L:CD R:OM (digital re-release)
- 2024: The Motes - The Riveter (digital)
