= Heavy Blinkers =

Canadian orchestrated-pop music group

The Heavy Blinkers
- Origin: Halifax, Nova Scotia, Canada
- Genres: Indie pop
- Years active: 1998–2013
- Label: Self released
- Members: Jason Michael MacIsaac, David Christensen, Jenn Grant, Adam Fine, Ellen Gibling, Melanie Stone, Stewart Legere, Warda Limaye
- Past members: Trevor Forbes, Sandy Gribbin, Andrew Watt, Ruth Minnikin, Greg Fry

The Heavy Blinkers were a Canadian orchestrated-pop music group, from Halifax, Nova Scotia. Their music is influenced by Brian Wilson, Serge Gainsbourg, Ennio Morricone, Paul McCartney, and Harry Nilsson. They released six studio albums from 1998 to 2013.

== History ==
The Heavy Blinkers were formed in 1998. Original members included Andrew Watt, singer Ruth Minnikin, and singer/songwriter Jason MacIsaac.

In 2000, the band released a self-titled EP. The style of the music has been compared to Brian Wilson's Smile project. The band released five albums, including 2004's The Night and I Are Still So Young. Their songs are published through Nettwerk Publishing. In January 2008, Watt and Minnikin left the band, leaving MacIsaac as the only remaining original member.

In 2013, the Heavy Blinkers released their 16-song album, Health. In 2014, the band was nominated for an East Coast Music Award for Pop Recording of the Year.

== Discography ==
- Hooray For Everything (Canada: Pleasant Street; 1998)
- Heavy Blinkers (Canada: Brobdingnagan Records; 2000)
- Better Weather (Canada: Brobdingnagian Records; 2002)
- The Night and I Are Still So Young (Canada: Endearing Records; US: Cooking Vinyl; 2005)
- International Pop Exchange (split with Orwell) - EP (Endearing Records; 2005)
- Health (self released; 2013)

=== Contributions ===
- Touch & Go (a Canadian film, provided the score) (2002)
- Lynne Me Your Ears (2002) – "You Took My Breath Away"
- Papa Nez: A Tribute to Michael Nesmith (2002) – "Magic"
- G-Spot (Canadian TV series) (2005) – "Silver Crown"
- Robson Arms (Canadian TV series) (2005) – "Filtered Light"

== See also ==
- Music of Nova Scotia
- List of bands from Canada
