= New Romance for Kids =

Canadian DIY independent record label

- Founded: 2001
- Founder: Jason Bissessar
- Genre: Various
- Country of origin: Canada
- Location: Montreal, Quebec
- Official website: newromanceforkids.com

New Romance for Kids is a Canadian DIY independent record label founded in Montreal. Started in 2001, the label is owned and operated by Mathieu Lachapelle, Guillaume Boudreau-Monty and Jason Bissessar.
