= Eddy (M) Melanson =

Canadian musician (born 1938)

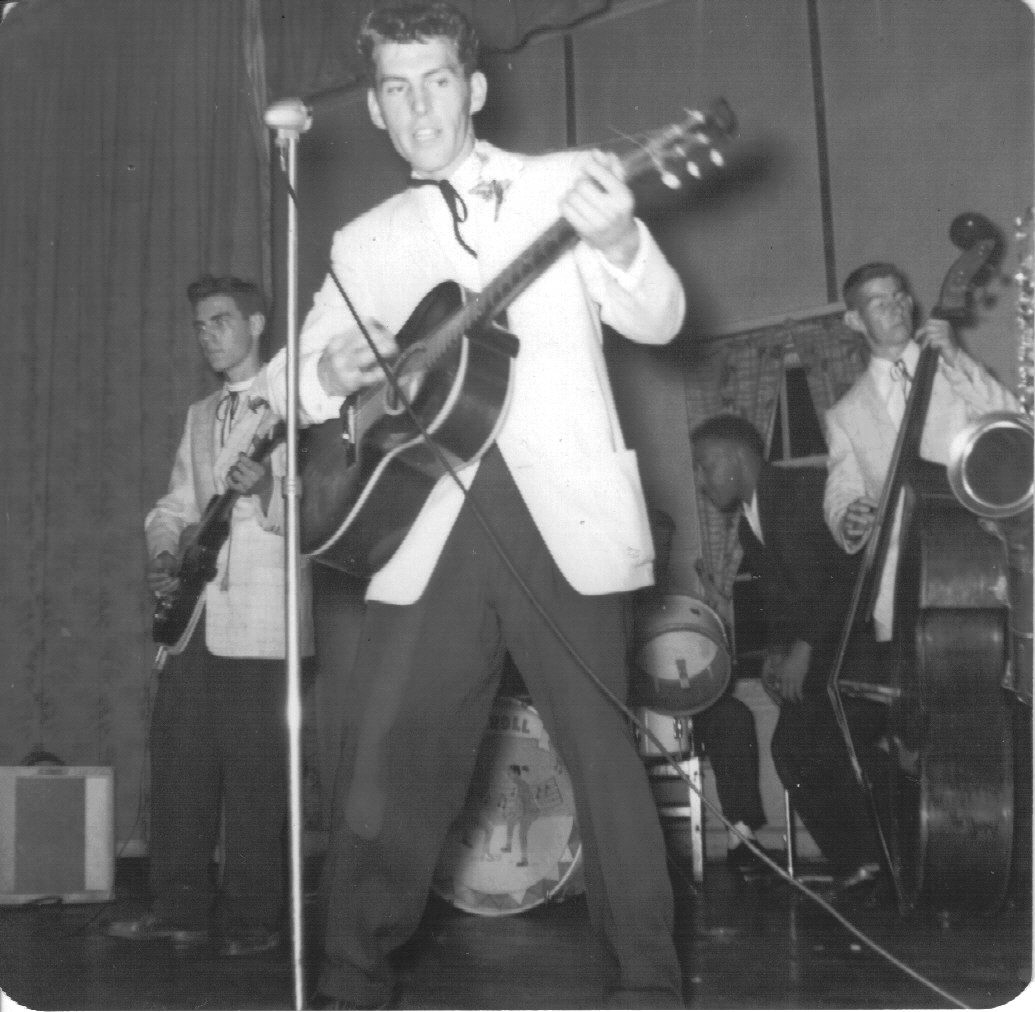
Eddy M Melanson and the Rock-A-Billys (1957)

Eddy M. Melanson (born July 25, 1938) is a Canadian musician who started his musical career in Halifax, Nova Scotia in 1953. Recipient of the ECMA Stompin' Tom Award, inducted into the Order of the Porcupine Hall of Fame, (Steve Fruitman, curator) the Rockabilly Hall of Fame in Nashville as an original Canadian Rockabilly, (Bob Timmers, curator), and the Nova Scotia Country Music Hall of Fame.

== Career ==
He was born in Wolfville, Nova Scotia, Canada. He started to play the guitar at age seven. When he was fourteen he sang in a minstrel show backed up by a lady playing a boogie woogie beat on the piano. He adapted the rhythm to his guitar, added a root to fifth riff and had the sound he would use for the next 60 years. Canadian Music Historian Steve Fruitman classified it as a reincarnation of the Country Jump Blues. He made his debut playing for the Halifax Colored Citizens improvement league in 1953. In 1955 Eddy joined the Halifax Civic Youth Dance Band playing guitar. After watching the 1956 release of the movie The Girl Can't Help It, he started his own band and called it Eddy M and the Rockabillys. Little did he know at the time that the term rockabilly would become a genre of music that would circle the globe.

When Bill Haley and the Comets toured in the Maritimes in 1958, Eddy and his band was selected as the Canadian group to open for the Comets and play for the dance following the show. He also produced a live radio show with his band on CKBW in Bridgewater. In 1959, he produced his first home grown rock and roll show in the Halifax Forum, featuring his Rockabillys, The Meteors, Art Sampson and his Rockets, the Lucky Four, the Rain Drops and from Kentville, Dutch Mason and the Esquires. At the end of the decade, Eddy and his band played the Casa Loma in Montreal backing up the Folies Berge dancers for their twist presentation.

The next move was to London, Ontario, where he formed a new group called Eddy M and the Miracles. He toured in the United States, made personal appearances with Buddy Knox and the Fendermen and in 1963 recorded some of his songs at Starday Studios in Nashville to be released on the Sparton label in Canada. In 1965 Eddy and his wife Melva moved to Ontario, where they bought some land and developed a private recreational complex complete with a recording studio, record label and a new band called Eddy M and the Memories. After releasing a single in 1982 he produced an album titled, 30 years of Eddy M. In 2003, he joined the broadcast team on CFBW, Hanover and, in 2010, produced a CD to give out to folks wherever he played. He celebrated 60 years in the business in 2013.

== Discography ==
=== Singles ===
- A - "Worry, Worry, Worry" - 1957
- B - "Down on the Farm"
- A - "Why Did You Say Goodbye" - 1963
- B - "Pardon Me But I'm Going Back Home"
- A - "Eddy M is Back Again" - 1982
- B - "Just Loving You"

=== Album ===
- 30 Years of Eddy M - 1982 (CD - 2010)
