= Crush (Canadian band) =

Canadian musical group

- Origin: Halifax, Nova Scotia, Canada
- Years active: 2000–2006, 2026-present
- Members: Paul Lamb; Cory Tetford; Ronald J Hynes; Kris MacFarlane
- Past members: Santiago Serna; Scott MacFarlane; Brian Talbot

Crush is a Canadian band based in Halifax, Nova Scotia. Leading band members are Paul Lamb and Cory Tetford, accompanied by Ronald J Hynes (bass) and Kris MacFarlane (drums). Past members included Santiago Serna, Scott MacFarlane and Brian Talbot.

== History ==
Lamb and Tetford founded Crush in 2000. The band released an album, Here in 2002, and a single from the album, "Live", was played on radio stations across Canada.

Crush was nominated for a Juno Award in 2003 as Best New Group.

In 2004, Crush earned five East Coast Music Awards, and was nominated for two more in 2005.

In 2026, Crush reunited to play the 41st annual George Street Festival in St. John’s, Newfoundland and Labrador.

== Discography ==
=== Studio albums ===
- 2002: Here
- 2003: Face in the Crowd

=== Singles ===
- 2002: "Live"
- 2002: "Here"
- 2003: "King for a Day"
- 2003: "Bad Enough"

== Awards and recognition ==
- 2003: Juno Awards, nominee for New Group of the Year
- 7 wins at the East Coast Music Awards over various years
