= Rebekah Higgs =

Canadian indie rock singer and songwriter

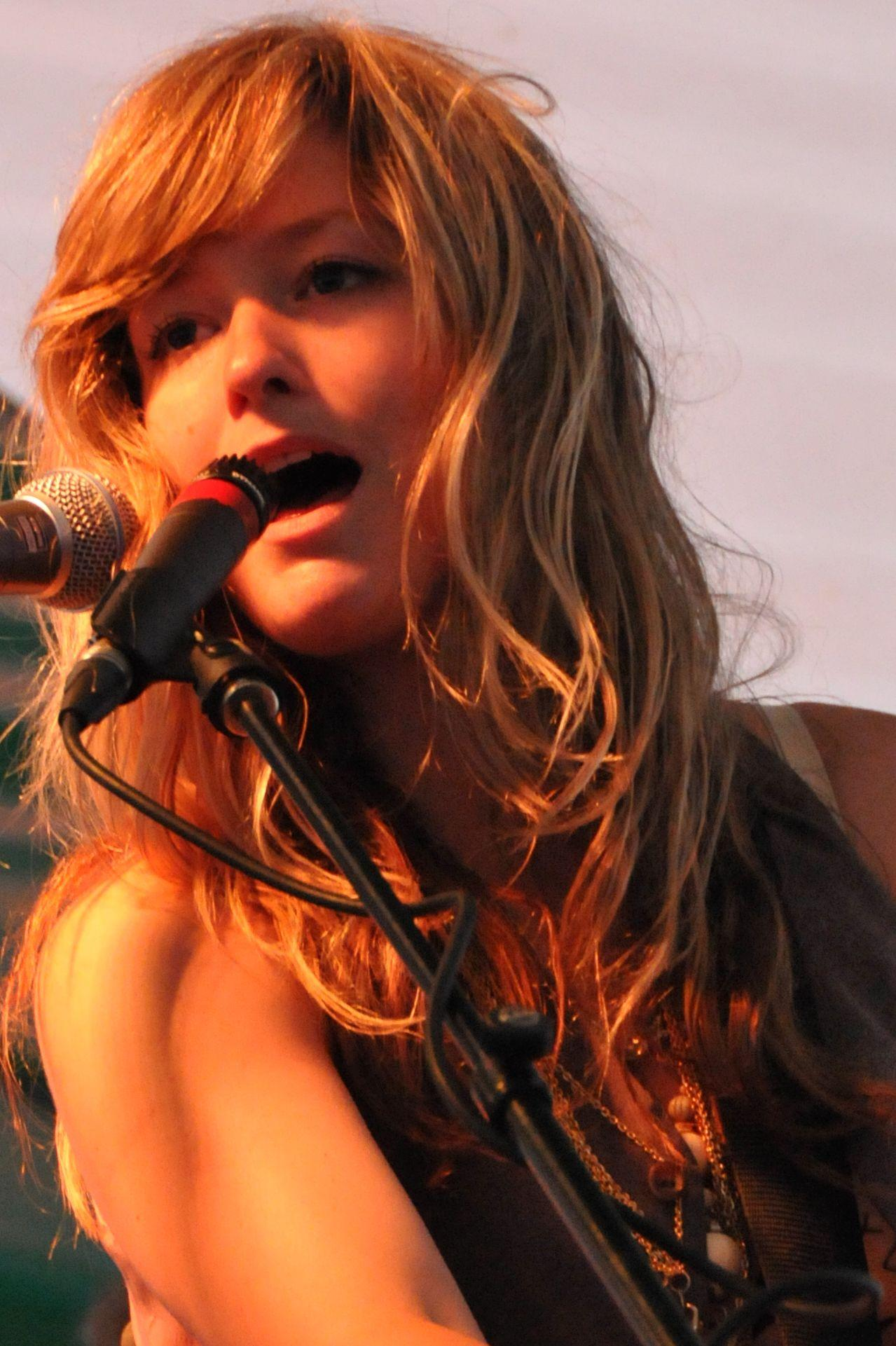
- Rebekah Higgs, July 2007

Background information
- Born: May 19, 1982 (age 43)
- Origin: Halifax, Nova Scotia, Canada
- Genres: Shoegaze, folk, pop music
- Occupation: Singer-songwriter
- Instrument(s): Vocals, guitar
- Labels: Outside Music (Canada)
- Website: RebekahHiggs.com

Rebekah Higgs (born May 19, 1982) is a Canadian indie rock singer-songwriter and television personality from Halifax, Nova Scotia.

In 2017, Higgs founded Matriarch productions, which produces the Canadian television show DIY MOM. She is the designer and star of the show, which showcases renovation and decor ideas on a single-mom budget.

== Career ==
Higgs released the EP Road to Eden in 2005. She followed up in September 2006 with her self-titled full-length debut album, recorded in Toronto with producer Thomas Payne of the Canadian band Joydrop. The album was written and performed entirely by Higgs and Payne, and is a fusion of shoegaze, folk and pop.

In 2007, Higgs re-released her album on Outside Music and was nominated for the 2008 East Coast Music Awards, for best female solo recording and best new artist. In 2010 her music video for the song "Parables" received an ECMA nomination for Best Video.

She toured Canada frequently from 2006 to 2012 with guitarist Jason Vautour, bassist Sean MacGillivray, and keyboardist Colin Crowell. All four musicians also performed in the dance pop group Ruby Jean and the Thoughtful Bees. They released an electronic dance album in 2009, touring the UK and Canada opening for Dragonette, and performing at Pride Toronto in 2010 on the same bill as Cyndi Lauper.

In 2011, Higgs released her second studio album, Odd Fellowship, on Hidden Pony Records. It was produced by Modest Mouse producer Brian Deck.

Higgs' daughter, Lennon, was born in 2013, and appeared on the cover of Higgs' final release, the 2013 EP Sha La La. After becoming a single mother, she moved home to Halifax, and changed careers to work in film and television. Her love for home décor and inspiring others led her to share her passion on camera under the name DIY MOM.

In 2014, Higgs started sharing decor and design tips as DIY MOM on YouTube. This became a TV show on Bell Fibe in 2017. She completed five seasons of the show with the network, one Christmas special and two backyard specials.

She is the owner of Matriarch Productions and produces her own content about renovating and designing as a single mom.

She frequently posts and creates new content for her Instagram page. Her home designs have been photographed and featured in Chatelaine, Forbes, HGTV Magazine, Style at Home, East Coast Living, and The Coast.

== Discography ==
- Road to Eden (2005)
- Rebekah Higgs (2006)
- Ruby Jean and the Thoughtful Bees (2009)
- Little Voice (2010)
- Little Voice Remix (2011)
- Odd Fellowship (2011)
- Rebel Rebel (2013)
- Sha La La (2013)
