= The Jimmy Swift Band =

Canadian indie rock band

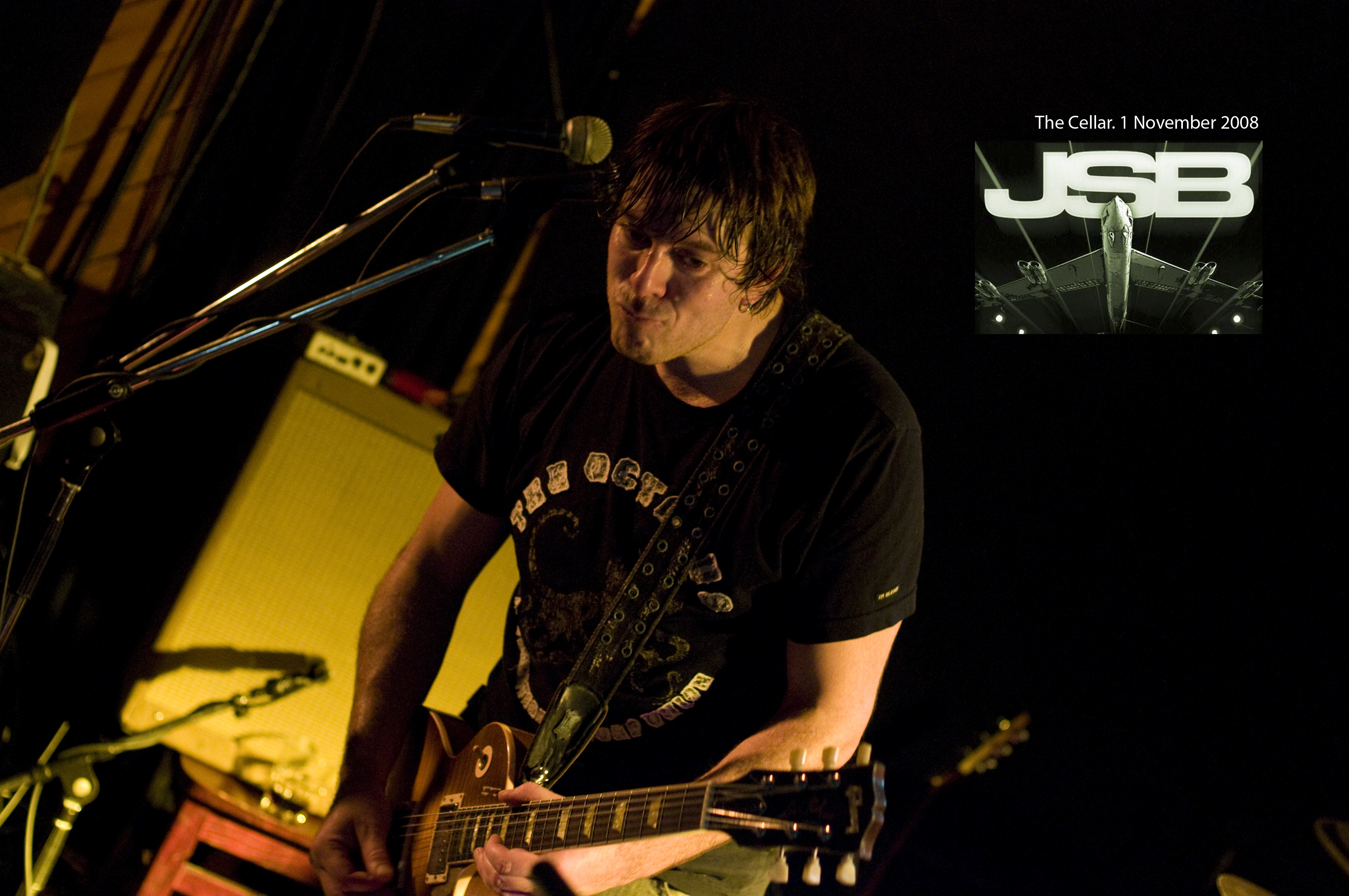

Background information
- Also known as: Fly Jimmy Swift, JSB
- Origin: Halifax, Nova Scotia, Canada
- Genres: Indie rock
- Years active: 1999–2014
- Labels: BelowMeMusic
- Members: Craig Mercer; Mike MacDougall; Aaron Collier; Nick Wombolt
- Past members: Jake Smith; Aaron Farr; Bob Deveau; Keith Mullins; Paul Christian; Douglas Cameron
- Website: thejimmyswiftband.com

The Jimmy Swift Band is a Canadian indie rock band from Halifax, Nova Scotia that combines elements of rock, jam, and electronica. Their band currently consists of 4 members, Craig Mercer on guitar and vocals, Mike MacDougall on bass, Aaron Collier on keyboards and effects, and Nick Wombolt on drums, the band has been most often described as rocktronica.

== Career ==
Formed in the late 1990s by members of the now-defunct band PF Station, JSB's name comes from the title of a subject in one of PF Station's songs, "A Night in the Life of Fly Jimmy Swift." Before their current name, the band was previously known as Fly Jimmy Swift. Combining guitar and a distinctly electronica keyboard sound with a rock rhythm section, the band is known for its live show with lengthy progressive instrumental jams.

The band has released five studio albums, two live albums, a live 5.1 concert DVD, a remix album, and a package on 8-track tape. They've won three East Coast Music Awards and numerous Music Industry Association of Nova Scotia (MIANS/Music Nova Scotia) awards over the past 15 years.

In 2004, the band produced their first video for the single "Two Hands on the Wheel" with New Brunswick filmmaker Greg Hemmings. On November 28, 2006, JSB released an animated video produced by Copernicus Studios for the single "Turnaround", from the album Weight of the World.

For close to 15 years, the band played up to 250 shows a year across Canada and the US, with stints in Asia and the Bahamas. They were considered instrumental in the development of Eastern Canada's Evolve Festival and Prince Edward Island's Shoreline Festival. Other events include Moedown (New York), Haymaker (Virginia), the World Electronic Music Festival (Toronto), Canada Day celebrations in Bermuda, and more. The group is at the head of the Atlantic Canada jam scene and frequently plays with fellow scenemates Grand Theft Bus and Slowcoaster.

On May 13, 2011, it was announced by Aaron Collier on his website that the band had decided to break up. Three years later, the band announced it would be touring Eastern Canada for one final tour, ending with a performance at the Evolve Music Festival in Antigonish, Nova Scotia.

Aaron Collier has gone on to a career in theatre, founding the Heist theatre company with his husband Richie Wilcox and becoming best known for his play The Princess Show.

== Discography ==
=== Albums ===
- Now They Will Know We Were Here – 2001

1. "Creepin'"
2. "Up in Arms"
3. "Beautiful in the Morning"
4. "Drive By"
5. "Now They Will Know We Were Here"
6. "Dreams"
7. "Commotion"
8. "Warm and Fuzzy Feeling"
9. "Concrete"
10. "When Worlds Collide"
11. "Rearrange"

- Onward Through the Fog – 2003

1. "Two Hands on the Wheel"
2. "Running High"
3. "Granted"
4. "The 80s Runway Model"
5. "Anhedonia"
6. "When It Comes to It"
7. "Now and Then"
8. "Yard Sale"
9. "Astronauts Attempting to Take Off Their Spacesuits so They May Copulate"
10. "Alignment"

- The Rebirth Of Hooch – 2004

1. "Now They Will Know We Were Here (pt 1)"
2. "Now They Will Know We Were Here (pt 2)"
3. "Creepin'"
4. "Daisy"
5. "Astronauts Attempting to Take Off Their Spacesuits..."
6. "...So They May Copulate"
7. "The 80s Runway Model"

- Precious Gems & Rarities (8-track cartridge only) – 2005
- Weight of the World – 2006

1. "Daisy"
2. "Turnaround"
3. "Mobilized"
4. "Immobilize"
5. "Roadrage"
6. "Onward Through the Fog"
7. "Exploration"
8. "Weight of the World"
9. "Faceless"
10. "2012"
11. "Evacuation"

- When All Is Said And Done... ...There'll Be A Lot More Said Than Done – 2011

1. "Immobilized"
2. "Evacuation (Remix)"
3. "Daisy (Remix)"
4. "Medicine Chest"
5. "Turning Of The Tide"
6. "Running Through The Tall Grass"
7. "The Bend"
8. "Goodbye"
9. "Onward Through The Fog (Remix)"
10. "Faceless (Remix)"
11. "Weight Of The World (Remix)"
12. "Road Rage"
13. "Outfacing"

=== PF Station ===
- Ahh Yeah (Drop Records) – 1998

=== Videos ===
- "Turnaround"
