= John Allan Cameron =

Canadian musician (1938–2006)

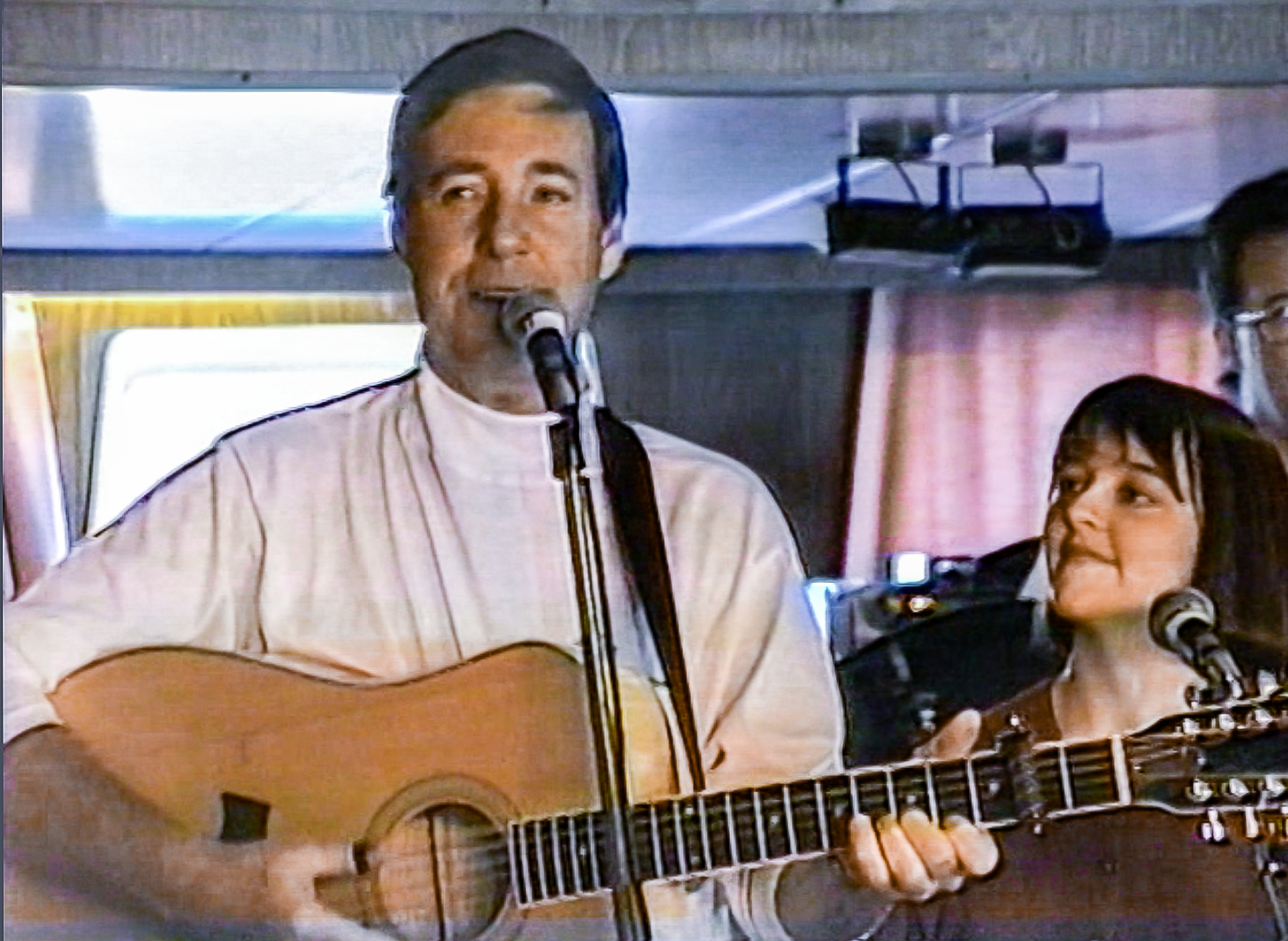
- John Allan Cameron performing in 1990

Background information
- Born: John Allan Cameron; 16 December 1938; Inverness County, Nova Scotia, Canada
- Origin: Cape Breton, Nova Scotia, Canada
- Died: 22 November 2006 (aged 67) Toronto, Ontario, Canada
- Genres: Celtic, Folk
- Labels: Glencoe Records, Freedom Records Inc.

John Allan Cameron, CM (16 December 1938 – 22 November 2006) was a Canadian folk singer, "The Godfather of Celtic Music" in Canada. Noted for performing traditional music on his twelve string guitar, he released his first album in 1969. He released 10 albums during his lifetime and was featured on national television. He was a recipient of the East Coast Music Award's Lifetime Achievement Award and the Order of Canada, conferred in 2003.

== Biography ==
Cameron was born in Inverness County, Nova Scotia to Dan L. Cameron and Catherine Anne (Katie Anne) MacDonald. Katie Anne (1914–1983) was the only sibling of renowned Cape Breton fiddler and composer Dan Rory MacDonald. In 1957 John Allan moved to Ottawa, Ontario where he studied to be a Roman Catholic priest through the Order of the Oblate Fathers. In 1964, a few months before ordination, Cameron obtained a dispensation from the church to pursue studies in education at St. Francis Xavier University, and eventually a career in music.

He was a regular on Singalong Jubilee in the 1960s and he was later host of two Canadian television series. The first was the Montreal-produced John Allan Cameron on CTV from 1975 to 1976. Guests included Stan Rogers, Edith Butler, The Good Brothers, Stringband, Colleen Peterson, Adam Mitchell, Michael Cooney, Shirley Eikhard, Liam Clancy, Tommy Makem, Nancy White, Steve Goodman, and Rhythm Pals. Cameron would return to national television on CBC with the Halifax-produced The John Allan Cameron Show which ran from 1979 to 1981. He was also a guest star on Sharon, Lois & Bram's The Elephant Show in 1986. John Allan Cameron also was the host of Super Variety Tonight, a CBC television special that aired on Sunday, 4 April 1982 featuring several guests including Sharon, Lois & Bram.

Besides his numerous television and concert appearances, he performed at the Grand Ole Opry in 1970.

In January 2005, Cameron was diagnosed with myelodysplastic syndrome. Several benefit projects such as concerts and a tribute CD were produced to support costs resulting from his treatment of this cancer.

On 22 November 2006, Cameron died in Toronto.

Cameron's son, Stuart Cameron is also an accomplished musician.

== Discography ==
=== Albums ===
Year	Album	CAN
1969	Here Comes John Allan Cameron	—
1969	The Minstrel of Cranberry Lane	—
1972	Get There by Dawn	75
1972	Lord of the Dance	—
1976	Weddings, Wakes and Other Things	78
1978	Fiddle	—
1979	Freeborn Man (reissued in 1991 as Classic John Allan Vol. 1)	—
1981	Song for the Mira	—
1987	Good Times	—
1991	Wind Willow	—
1996	Glencoe Station	—

=== Compilations ===
Year	Album
1982	The Best of John Allan Cameron
1992	Classic John Allan, vol 2
1996	Classic John Allan, vol 3

=== Singles ===
Year	Single	Chart Positions		Album
Year	Single	CAN Country	CAN AC	Album
1972	"Streets of London"	—	4	single only
1972	"Get There by Dawn"	—	11	Get There by Dawn
1973	"I Can't Tell You"	28	—	Lord of the Dance
1976	"Tie Me Down"	—	33	Weddings, Wakes and Other Things
1982	"Overnight Success"	15	—	single only
1996	"Getting Dark Again"	—	—	Glencoe Station
