= Black Moor (musical group) =

Canadian heavy metal band

- Origin: Halifax, Nova Scotia, Canada
- Genres: Heavy Metal
- Years active: 2005–present
- Members: Eric Hanlin; Evan Frizzle; Brycen Gunn; Bobby Webb
- Past members: Rob Nickerson; Kenny Myers; Nick Jones; Sylvain Coderre
- Website: www.black-moor.com (defunct)

Black Moor is a Canadian heavy metal band formed in 2005 in Cole Harbour, Nova Scotia, Canada. Since their inception, they have worked steadily to expand their fanbase and refine their sound, described as "retro, riding that familiar border between traditional heavy metal and speed metal, putting the band squarely in the New Wave of Traditional Heavy Metal camp."

In June 2008, the members of Black Moor were involved in a car accident while on their way home from playing a show in Montreal. All survived, but the crash left drummer Sylvain Coderre with severe injuries and the accident set back production on the band's debut album The Conquering by almost a year.

In 2009, the group signed to Halifax-based Diminished Fifth Records and released their debut album The Conquering. They released the album Lethal Waters in 2012, and Brave to the Grave in 2016.

== Members ==
- Eric Hanlin — Rhythm Guitar / Vocals
- Evan Frizzle — Lead Guitar / Vocals
- Brycen Gunn — Bass / Vocals
- Bobby Webb — Drums

== Past members ==
- Rob Nickerson — bass
- Kenny Myers — drums
- Sylvain Coderre — drums
- Nick Jones — lead guitar

== Discography ==
- The Conquering – 2009, Diminished Fifth Records
- Lethal Waters – 2012, Diminished Fifth Records
- Brave To The Grave – 2016, Self-Released
