= The Hardship Post =

- Also known as: The New Hardship Post
- Origin: St. John's, Newfoundland and Labrador, Canada
- Genres: Indie rock, Grunge
- Years active: 1992 – 1997
- Labels: Sub Pop; Murderecords; Cinnamon Toast Records; Mag Wheel Records
- Past members: Sebastian Lippa; Mike Pick; Matt Clarke; Alyson MacLeod; Mike Kean

The Hardship Post was a Canadian alternative rock band that formed in St. John’s, Newfoundland and Labrador, in 1992. The band moved to Halifax, Nova Scotia, during the Halifax Pop Explosion of the early 1990s.

The band originally consisted of vocalist and guitarist Sebastian Lippa, bassist Mike Kean and drummer Matt Clarke. Initially signed to Murderecords, they released the EPs Mood Ring and Hack in 1993, and undertook their first cross-Canada tour to support the recordings. Mike Pick would replace Kean on bass in mid-1993.

In late 1994, they signed to Sub Pop, which released their full-length album Somebody Spoke in 1995. Around that time Clarke left the band, and was replaced by Alyson MacLeod of Jale. This formation of the band would be known as "The New Hardship Post", which released one single on Squirtgun Records, in 1996. This iteration of the band provided a track on the various artists compilation Pet-kout-koy-ek: Songs For A River; the compilation was also released in 1996.

Hardship Post won as Best Alternative Band at the 1994 East Coast Music Awards, and were nominated for the same award in 1996. At the Juno Awards of 1996, Somebody Spoke was a nominee for Best Alternative Album.

Prior to the groups dissolution in 1997, the band recorded a second album for Sub Pop in 1996. It was recorded on 4-track in their rehearsal space. This album has never been released, or leaked.

The band broke up in 1997.

== Discography ==
=== Singles ===
- 1992: Sugarcane/Canopy (7" single)
- 1993: Mood Ring (EP)
- 1993: Hack (EP)
- 1994: Why Don't You and I Smooth Things Over (7" single)
- 1994: Won't You Come Home? (Flexi-disc single)
- 1994: Rock Is My Life (split 7" single w/ Randy Bachman)
- 1994: Slick Talking Jack/If I... (7" single)
- 1995: Watchin' You/Your Sunshine (7" single)
- 1996: No Time/Turn It Up (7" single) [as "The New Hardship Post"]

=== Studio albums ===
- 1995: Somebody Spoke

=== Compilations ===
- 2025: Hardship Post: 1992-1994 (2xLP, archival collection)
