= Slowcoaster =

Canadian rock band

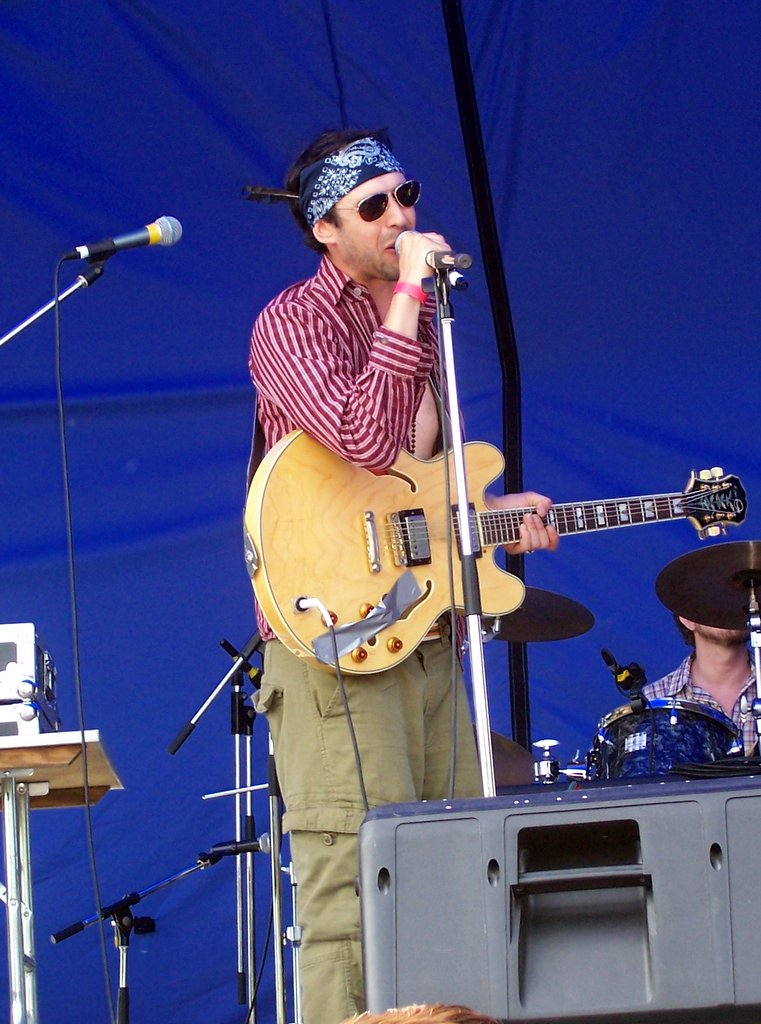
- Steven MacDougall performing at the Shoreline Festival in 2005

Background information
- Origin: Sydney, Nova Scotia, Canada
- Genres: Indie rock
- Years active: 1999–present
- Label: Company House
- Members: Steven MacDougall; Mike LeLievre; Devon Strang
- Past members: Brian Talbot, Jordan Bruleigh
- Website: www.slowcoaster.ca

Slowcoaster is a Canadian indie rock band from Sydney, Nova Scotia. The band's sound is rock-based, with strong influences of reggae, ska, folk and jazz.

== History ==
Slowcoaster was formed in November 1999 by guitarist Steven MacDougall, drummer Devon Strang, and bassist Mike LeLievre. To promote themselves, they founded their own management company, House of Rock, which has since become influential in promoting a number of acts from Cape Breton Island. The band performed locally and toured the Maritimes, releasing two EPs, Jody's Garden and Volume II. Slowcoaster added percussionist Darren Gallop to the lineup in 2002 and released Leaves, with Accidents & Excuses following in 2003.

The band began touring nationally and their debut album, Where Are They Going? was released in 2004. Steven MacDougall's song "Spanish Bay" placed second in the 16th Annual National Songwriting Competition the same year. A video for the single "Patio" was released and saw national play on MuchMusic. Drummer Devon Strang left the band around this time, with longtime collaborator Brian Talbot replacing him.

Slowcoaster came to the forefront of the Maritime live music scene in 2005 and 2006, touring frequently and headlining at Nova Scotia's Evolve Festival and Stan Rogers Folk Festival, New Brunswick's Sunseekers ball music festival, the Canada Day Countdown and Harvest Jazz & Blues Festival, and Prince Edward Island's Shoreline Festival.

They won Music Nova Scotia's Alternative Group of the Year award in 2005, and an ECMA award for Alternative Recording of the Year in 2006.

In 2007, the band released Future Radio. A video for the single "Leave" was released in early 2008. They followed up in 2010 with the album The Darkest of Discos, again winning the ECMA for Alternative Recording of the Year in 2011. The band released The Girls Downtown, in 2013.

In the spring of 2018, the band recorded a continuous set of nine songs, and released it as a single digital-only LP, simply titled Track1 on Bandcamp, in June 2018.

In 2020, the band released the digital-only single, "Haunt You", from their then-forthcoming LP, Apples & Oranges.

In February 2023, the band re-released Where Are They Going, digitally on Bandcamp.

The bands most recent LP Apples & Oranges, was released in July 2023.

== Discography ==
=== Albums ===
- Where Are They Going? – 2004
- Future Radio – 2007
- The Darkest of Discos – 2010
- The Girls Downtown – 2013
- Apples & Oranges – 2023

=== EPs ===
- Jody's Garden – 2000
- Volume II – 2001
- Leaves – 2002
- Accidents & Excuses – 2003
