= North of America =

Canadian punk rock band

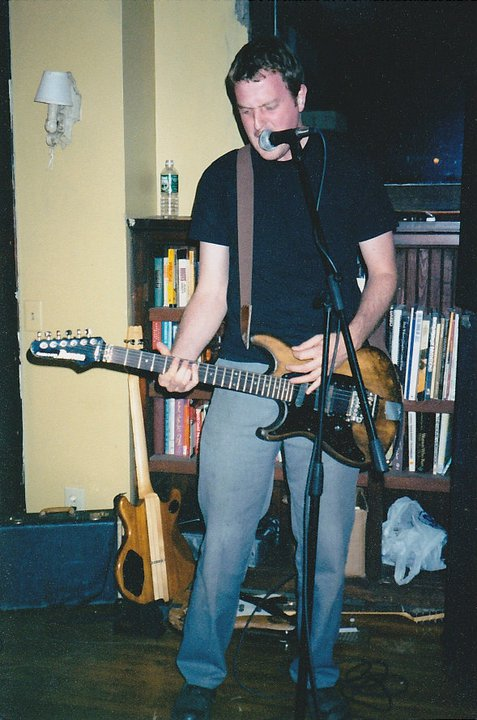
- North of America live in Indianapolis, Indiana, in the early 2000s.

Background information
- Origin: Halifax, Nova Scotia, Canada
- Genres: Post-hardcore
- Years active: 1997–2003 (Reunions: 2005, 2008, 2010, 2017, 2023)
- Labels: Level Plane, Rewika Records, Matlock Records
- Members: Mark Mullane; Michael Catano; Mark Colavecchia; Jim MacAlpine
- Past members: J. LaPointe
- Website: www.level-plane.com

North of America is a Canadian post hardcore band formed in 1997 in Halifax, Nova Scotia. The music group has recorded with Matlock Records in Canada and the American label Level Plane Records. Members of Halifax's State Champs and Truro's The Motes formed North of America in 1997. They have toured throughout North America and Europe, and members have been involved with other musical projects such as The Plan, The Holy Shroud, INSTRUMENTS, Vkngs, The Got To Get Got, Ov Gramme, production for Buck 65, and composition of original music for the award winning CBC television show Street Cents.

The original line-up of the band consisted of Michael Catano, Mark Mullane, J. LaPointe, and Mark Colavecchia. LaPointe left the band after the recording of This is Dance Floor Numerology in 2001. LaPointe was replaced by Jim MacAlpine as of the 2003 Level Plane release, Brothers, Sisters.

North of America disbanded after releasing Brothers, Sisters. Current members now reside in Halifax and Vancouver. Since the breakup, the band has played a number of reunion shows; they embarked on a Canadian tour in 2005 with Ted Leo and the Pharmacists and performed again in 2010.

A collection of rarities and outtakes, 12345678910 was released in 2010 on cassette label Bart Records.

In 2023, they reunited to play three sold out shows at Dartmouth's Woodside Tavern on November 17 and 18.

== Discography ==
- 12345678910 Cassette, Bart Records, 2010
- Brothers, Sisters LP, Level Plane Records, 04/01/2003
- Elements of an Incomplete Map, Pt. II 2002
- The Sepultura CD, Level Plane Records, 02/01/2002
- This is Dance Floor Numerology CD, Progeria Records, 04/04/2001
- The Sepultura LP, The Kingdom of God, 10/04/2000
- These Songs are Cursed CD/LP, Matlock Records (USA and Canada), Rewika Records (Europe), 04/12/1999
- Bayonet Point 7", Montesano Records, 1999
- Elements of an Incomplete Map CD, Matlock Records, 06/12/1998

== Compilation appearances ==
- Walking in Greatcoats on Four Dots, Montesano Records (1999)
- The Sneaks are Everywhere on Self Portrait Compilation 7" (1999)
- Overcoated on Making the Impossible Possible, Chimaeric (1999)
- We Had To Call Your Parents on In The Film They Made Us A Little More Articulate, Escape Goat Records, 2003
