= Dan R. MacDonald =

Canadian musician (1911–1976)

- Born: Dan Rory MacDonald; February 2, 1911; Port Hood, Nova Scotia, Canada
- Died: September 20, 1976 (aged 65) Inverness, Nova Scotia
- Occupation: Fiddler
- Instrument: Violin

Dan Rory MacDonald (February 2, 1911 – September 20, 1976) was a Canadian fiddler who lived in Cape Breton. He is notable for his composition of many fiddle tunes.

== Early life ==
MacDonald was born to Johnny "the Carpenter" MacDonald (Johnny “Ghilleasbuig Iain” of Glencoe Road, a noted fiddler) and Jessie O'Hanley in southwest Port Hood, at the home of Angus "the Carpenter" MacDonald (brother of Johnny). MacDonald was raised in Judique, Inverness County on Cape Breton Island. Known as "Dan R.", he was encouraged by his father to study music at an early age. His father took him to the home of Hugh A. O’Hanley in Judique South in 1921, where Angus A. MacDougall and Allan MacDougall would go to play the fiddle. Hugh O'Hanley gave Dan R. a violin which had belonged to Hugh's brother and Dan R.'s grandfather, Allan O’Hanley. In 1930, MacDonald went to Glendale and learned to read music from John Willie MacEachern.

MacDonald made his first radio appearance in 1935 on radio station CJCB in Sydney. The next year he composed his first tune, a reel called The Red Shoes. He made his first recording in 1939, including one of his own compositions called Lassies of Campbell Street. MacDonald enlisted in the army in 1940, and served in Britain, France, Germany, and Belgium. He regularly played on the BBC while stationed at Abergeldie Castle in Scotland. He also met and was taught by J. Murdoch Henderson, a Scottish composer and music critic. During his time in Scotland MacDonald composed Heather Hill.

== Career ==
After his discharge in 1946, MacDonald briefly moved to Boston, and then to Hamilton, Ontario, followed by eleven years in Windsor working in the automotive plants. He later became part of the group, The Five MacDonald Fiddlers, organized by a fiddler named Johnnie Archie MacDonald. The group recorded two LPs.

In 1957, MacDonald left Windsor and moved to the mining town of Elliot Lake. However, he soon had to give up his job due to failing eyesight, and he moved back to Nova Scotia in 1959. He first settled in Sydney, where he recorded four LPs for Rodeo Records. He spent his remaining years living in various parts of Cape Breton. During the 1970s, he became a regular performer on the CBC Television program Ceilidh. MacDonald was a fluent speaker of Scottish Gaelic and was recorded playing and discussing his music in his native language, for Scotland's BBC Radio nan Gàidheal in 1972. He made his final public performance in July 1976, at a concert at Broad Cove. He died on September 20, 1976, at Inverness, Nova Scotia.

== Sampled music ==
MacDonald estimated in the early 1970s that he had written over two thousand tunes which other musicians have recorded. In addition to the ones already mentioned, MacDonald wrote Lime Hill, Tom Rae, The Boys of the Lake, The Trip to Windsor, and Reichwall Forest. Two published volumes of his compositions exist: The Heather Hill Collection and The Trip To Windsor Collection.

== Publications ==
- MacDonald, Dan R, and Cameron, John Donald (2000), The Heather Hill Collection
